= List of Miss Chinese International editions =

The following is a list of Miss Chinese International pageant edition and information.

Year	Edition	Date	Venue	Host country	Entrants
1988	1st	October 2	Lee Theatre, Hong Kong	Hong Kong	17
1989	2nd	December 17	TV City, Hong Kong	Hong Kong	20
1990	Postponed to February 1991				
1991	3rd	February 10	TV City, Hong Kong	Hong Kong	23
1992	4th	January 26	TV City, Hong Kong	Hong Kong	21
1993	5th	January 10	TV City, Hong Kong	Hong Kong	27
1994	6th	January 23	TV City, Hong Kong	Hong Kong	21
1995	7th	January 22	TV City, Hong Kong	Hong Kong	19
1996	8th	January 27	TV City, Hong Kong	Hong Kong	19
1997	9th	January 26	TV City, Hong Kong	Hong Kong	19
1998	10th	January 25	TV City, Hong Kong	Hong Kong	17
1999	11th	February 14	TV City, Hong Kong	Hong Kong	17
2000	12th	February 6	Caesars Palace, Paradise, Nevada	USA	19
2001	13th	January 20	TV City, Hong Kong	Hong Kong	20
2002	14th	January 27	Chime-Long Paradise, Guangzhou	China	19
2003	15th	January 25	TV City, Hong Kong	Hong Kong	20
2004	16th	January 17	TVB City, Hong Kong	Hong Kong	21
2005	17th	January 29	TVB City, Hong Kong	Hong Kong	22
2006	18th	January 21	TVB City, Hong Kong	Hong Kong	17
2007	19th	January 20	Foshan City News & Broadcast Centre, Foshan	China	21
2008	20th	January 26	Foshan City News & Broadcast Centre, Foshan	China	23
2009	21st	January 17	Foshan City News & Broadcast Centre, Foshan	China	28
2010	22nd	November 5	Tianjin Goldin Metropolitan Hotel, Tianjin	China	24
2011	Postponed to January 2012				
2012	23rd	January 15	TVB City, Hong Kong	Hong Kong	28
2013	24th	February 24	TVB City, Hong Kong	Hong Kong	16
2014	25th	January 26	TVB City, Hong Kong	Hong Kong	16
2015	26th	January 25	TVB City, Hong Kong	Hong Kong	18
2016	27th	January 23	TVB City, Hong Kong	Hong Kong	14
2017	28th	January 15	Arena of Stars, Genting Highlands, Pahang	Malaysia	16
2018	29th	February 3	TVB City, Hong Kong	Hong Kong	16
2019	30th	March 2	TVB City, Hong Kong	Hong Kong	19
2020	Postponed to 2021 due to COVID-19 pandemic				

== Host Country/Territory by Number ==
Country/Territory	Hosts	Year(s)
Hong Kong	24	1988–1989, 1991–1999, 2001, 2003–2006, 2012–2016, 2018-2020
China	5	2002, 2007-2010
Malaysia	1	2017
United States	1	2000

- No Pageant Held in 1990, 2011, 2020
