= Miss New York Chinese Pageant =

Miss New York Chinese Pageant logo

Miss NY Chinese, also known as Miss New York Chinese or Miss Chinese New York and formerly called Miss Greater Chinatown NYC Beauty Pageant, is a beauty pageant that selects New York City's representative to the Miss Chinese International beauty pageant held in Hong Kong each year. Notable winners include Michelle Ye and Fala Chen. Participants must be between the ages of 17 and 25 with a basic understanding of the Chinese language, among other requirements.

== List of winners ==
Note: The winners from 1992 to 2000 held the title Miss Greater Chinatown NYC. In 2002, the pageant's name was changed to Miss NY Chinese. The omitted years represent no New York representative to the pageant. The Miss New York Chinese Pageant started in 2001.

Year represented at MCI	Delegate number at MCI and name	Hometown	Age^{1}	Placement at Miss Chinese International	Special awards at Miss Chinese International	Notes
2019	13. Gina Wu		25	2nd Runner-up		
2018	10. Rose Li		22	Winner		
2017	11. Stitch Yu		22	Winner		
2016	9. Mary Chen		18	1st Runner-up		
2015	11. Catherine (Juqiao) Hui	Yunnan, China	18	2nd Runner-up		
2014	10. Maggie Zhang		21	Top 5 finalist		
2013	11. Vivian Li	Jiang Su, China	21			
2012	15. Jasmine Hayter	Atlanta, Georgia	20	Top 10 Finalist	Euro-America Region Vitality Award	
2010	12. Cynthia Zhang	Jilin, China	20	Top 12 Semifinalist		Published Chinese author at age of 12. Runway model
2009	18. Vicki Pon		18			
2008	17. Stacy Wang	Harbin, China	18			Later crowned as the winner of Phoenix TV's 2009 Miss Chinese Cosmos of the Americas in Las Vegas. Briefly a mainland China TV actress with Hairun Media.
2007	9. Sirena Wang	Jilin, China	20	Top 5 finalist	Audience Favorite Award	
2006	3. Nicole Wang		22			Later a mainland China actress
2005	10. Fala Chen	Chengdu, China	21	1st runner up		Previously Miss Asian America 2002 and 1st runner up at Miss Chinatown USA 2003. Later TVB actress.
2004	18. Lien Xian		17			
2003	14. Jessie Liu					First Miss NY Chinese winner to compete in Miss Chinese International.
2000	7. Mimi Chen		21			
1999	14. Michelle Ye			Winner	Miss Classic Beauty	Originally second runner up at Miss NY Chinese 1998 but later winner after original winner resigned and 1st runner up declined title. Later TVB actress. But she accepted the contract with Rich & Famous Talent Management Group Limited when her contract ended with TVB in June 2005.
1996	11. Amy Chung			2nd runner up		Later dethroned as 2nd runner up and Miss NY Chinese 1995 after it was found out that she committed credit fraud and failed to report it. Chung also lied about enrolling and graduating with a masters from Harvard University.
1995	6. Linda Liu					
1994	11. Diane Wang			1st runner up		
1993	7. Sun Kit Man					First Miss Greater Chinatown NYC winner and first NY representative at Miss Chinese International.

^{1} Age at the time of the Miss Chinese International pageant

== Acting success ==
Past winners have gone on to work in the entertainment industry (e.g., acting, singing) in China (Hong Kong and mainland), but this is not a guarantee. Most notable is Michelle Ye, who was a TVB actress for six years. Fala Chen is also an actress in TVB now. Nicole Wang is currently located in mainland China for acting.

== See also ==
- Miss Chinese International
- Miss Chinese Vancouver
- Miss Chinese Toronto
