= Miss Chinese International Pageant 2018 =

- Date: February 3, 2018
- Presenters: Andrew Yuen Man-kit, Mayanne Mak, Patrick Lam
- Venue: TVB City, Hong Kong
- Broadcaster: TVB
- Entrants: 16
- Placements: 10
- Winner: Rose Li; New York City
- Congeniality: Crystal Yang; Hawaii

The 29th Miss Chinese International Pageant, Miss Chinese International Pageant 2018 was held on February 3, 2018. Miss Chinese International 2017 Stitch Yu of New York City, USA crowned her successor Rose Li of New York City, United States at the end of the pageant.

== Results ==
=== Placements ===
Placement	Contestant
Miss Chinese International 2018	New York City – Rose Li 李思佳
1st Runner-Up	Los Angeles – Angela Liu 劉思延
2nd Runner-Up	Hong Kong – Juliette Louie 雷莊𠒇
Top 5	Toronto – Tiffany Choi 蔡菀庭; Vancouver – Cheryl Ng 伍殷嬅
Top 10	Foshan – Arrixy Li 李思佳; Hawaii – Crystal Yang 楊筑晶; Davao City – Joy Wu 吳雪蓮; San Francisco – Elisa Santos 高詠堃; Singapore – Christina Cai 蔡美琪

The top 10 was notable in that there were two contestants with identical Chinese names.

=== Special awards ===
Special Awards	Contestant	City/Region Represented	Country Represented
Miss Friendship	Crystal Yang 楊筑晶	Hawaii	United States
Most "Liked" Talent Award	Elisa Santos 高詠堃	San Francisco	United States

== Judges ==
=== Diamond Judging Panel ===
- Kristal Tin (Head Judge)
- Leanne Li, Miss Chinese International 2005
- Sarah Song, Miss Chinese International 2007
- Eliza Sam, Miss Chinese International 2010
- Kelly Cheung, Miss Chinese International 2012
- Gloria Tang, Miss Chinese International 2013
- Grace Chan, Miss Chinese International 2014; Miss Hong Kong 2013
- Sisley Choi, Miss Hong Kong Pageant 2013 First Runner-Up
- Tracy Chu, Miss Hong Kong Pageant 2012 Second Runner-Up

== Contestant list ==
No.	Contestant Name	Represented City	Represented Country/Region	Age	Height
1	Arrixy Li 李思佳	Foshan	China	21	5' 9"
2	Crystal Yang 楊筑晶	Hawaii	United States	24	5' 11"
3	Juliette Louie 雷莊𠒇	Hong Kong	Hong Kong	23	5' 7.5"
4	Tiffany Teh 鄭亦庭	Kuala Lumpur	Malaysia	21	5' 6"
5	Vaniphone "Yoyo" Phoumixay 王妮芬	Laos	Laos	22	5' 5.5"
6	Angela Liu 劉思延	Los Angeles	United States	19	5' 8"
7	Joy Wu 吳雪蓮	Manila	Philippines	22	5' 9"
8	Sabrina Shi 史孟冰	Melbourne	Australia	20	5' 8"
9	Jessie Chau 周卓妍	Montréal	Canada	26	5' 8"
10	Rose Li 李思佳	New York City	United States	22	5' 5"
11	Elisa Santos 高詠堃	San Francisco	United States	25	5' 3.5"
12	Christina Cai 蔡美琪	Singapore	Singapore	18	5' 3"
13	Summer Meng 孟鈺	Sydney	Australia	21	5' 6"
14	Linda Chung 鍾梓甜	Tahiti	French Polynesia	26	5' 6"
15	Tiffany Choi 蔡菀庭	Toronto	Canada	23	5' 5"
16	Cheryl Ng 伍殷嬅	Vancouver	Canada	24	5' 4"

== Notes ==
=== Replacements ===
- Kuala Lumpur, Malaysia – Miss Astro 2017 winner Moon Chen was replaced by the 1st runner-up, Tiffany Teh because of her illness.
- Montréal, Canada – Miss Chinese Montreal 2017 winner Becky Shen was replaced by the 1st runner-up, Jessie Chau because of her studies.

== Crossovers ==
Contestants who previously competed or will be competing at other international beauty pageants:

Miss Earth

- 2020: Singapore: Christina Cai (Top 20)

Miss Face of Humanity

- 2022: Hong Kong: Juliette Louie (4th Ambassador)

Ms. Chinatown Global

- 2025: Hong Kong: Juliette Louie (1st Runner-Up)
