= Miss Chinese International Pageant 2019 =

- Date: March 2, 2019
- Presenters: Louisa Mak, Andrew Yuen Man-kit, Luk Ho Ming
- Venue: TVB City, Hong Kong
- Broadcaster: TVB
- Entrants: 19
- Placements: 10
- Winner: Hera Chan; Hong Kong
- Congeniality: Tavee Meesang; Bangkok

The 30th Miss Chinese International Pageant, Miss Chinese International Pageant 2019 was held on March 2, 2019. Miss Chinese International 2018 Rose Li of New York City, USA crowned her successor Hera Chan of Hong Kong at the end of the pageant.

== Pageant information ==
The slogan to this year's pageant was "Next-level beauty causes jealousy, but hiding beauty is the actual hypocrisy" 「靚得離地 令人妒忌 隱藏美麗 才是虛偽」. The masters of ceremony this year were actor Andrew Yuen Man-kit, Miss Hong Kong 2015 Louisa Mak, and presenter Luk Ho Ming. Once again, there were two judging panels this year, along with the main judging panel is the Elegant Judging Panel. Both panels solely consist of Hong Kong celebrities associated with organizer TVB. The Elegant Judging Panel do not interfere with the actual scoring of the pageant, rather provide the viewers of how the delegates fared during each round of competition in the minds of those celebrities on the panel, both the top scorers, and the underperformers.

There were several firsts in the placement of this year's pageant. With Stephanie Wang crowned first runner-up, this is the first time Hawaii has ever been placed in the top three since their involvement in the pageant in 1995. Also, Morgane Yueng became Tahiti's first representative ever to place in the top 5 since the first iteration of the pageant back in 1988, and the first placement since Lai-Chun Kwong placed in the top 12 in Miss Chinese International Pageant 1992. Additionally, Lisa He became London's first representative ever to place in the top 5 since the first iteration of the pageant back in 1988, and the first placement since Roro Chen placed in the top 10 in Miss Chinese International Pageant 2012.

== Judges ==
- Christine Kuo, Miss Chinese International 2009
- Kelly Cheung, Miss Chinese International 2012
- Rebecca Zhu, Miss Hong Kong 2011
- Moses Chan, actor
- Joe Ma, actor

== Results ==
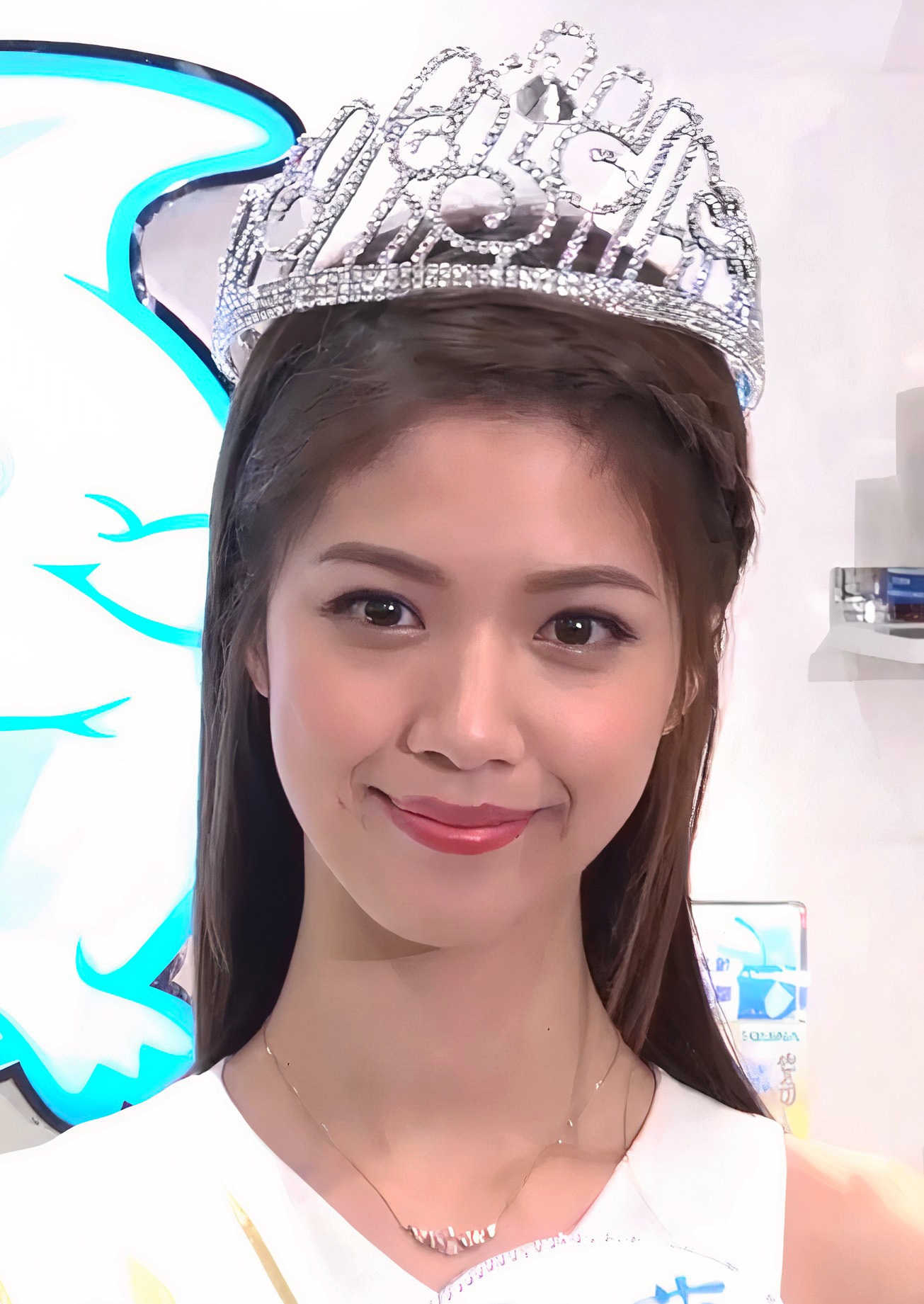
Miss Chinese International 2019, Hera Chan

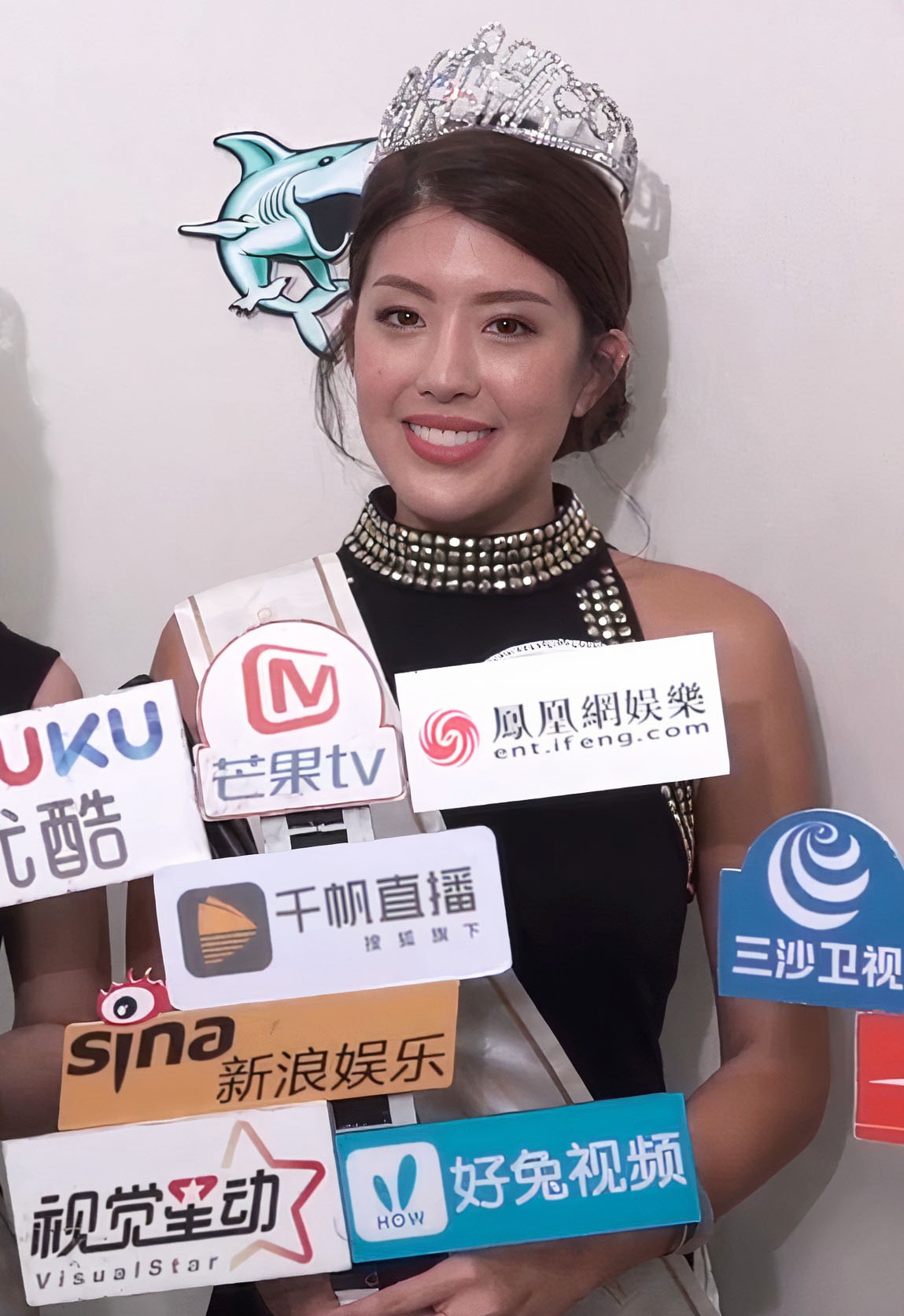
1st Runner-Up, Stephanie Wang

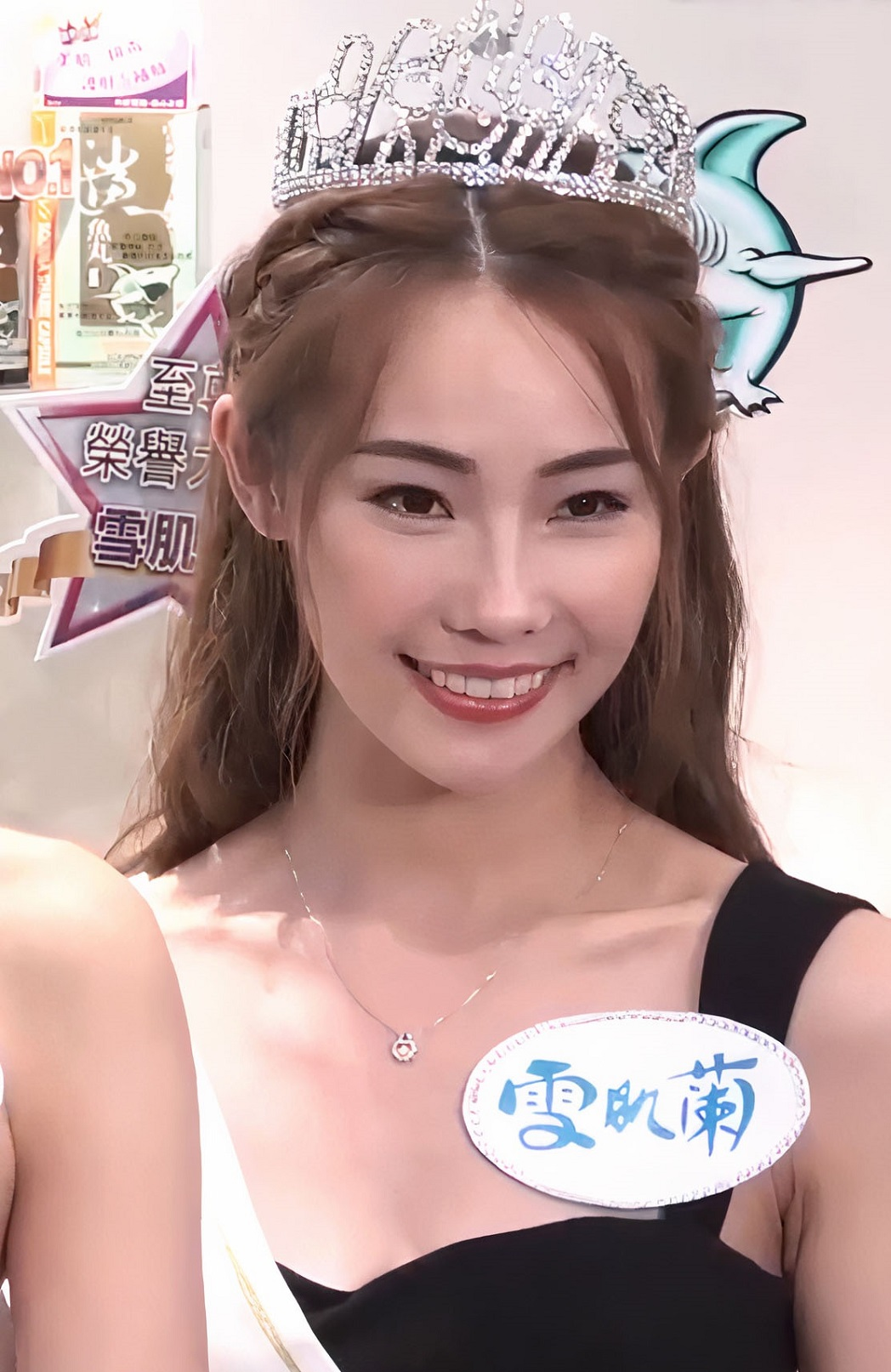
2nd Runner-Up, Gina Wu

Placement	Contestant
Miss Chinese International 2019	Hong Kong – Hera Chan 陳曉華
1st Runner-Up	Hawaii – Stephanie Wang 王慧媛
2nd Runner-Up	New York City – Gina Wu 吳雅珠
Top 5	London – Lisa He 賀灕灑; Tahiti – Morgane Yueng 楊美麗
Top 10	Chicago – Ida Duan 段薏丹; Los Angeles – Catherine Liang 梁瀅; Meizhou – Kitty Huang 黃夢晴; Melbourne – Finola Xie 謝曉穎; Vancouver – Alice Lin 林昀佳

=== Special awards ===
Award	Contestant
Miss Friendship	Bangkok – Tavee Meesang 鄭子怡
Miss Fitness	Melbourne – Finola Xie 謝曉穎
Miss Vitality	Hawaii – Stephanie Wang 王慧媛
Most "Liked" Talent Award	Brisbane – Joanne Thai 蔡麗欣

== Contestant list ==
No.	Contestant Name	Represented City/Region	Represented Country	Age	Height
1	Tavee Meesang 鄭子怡	Bangkok	Thailand	24	5' 7"
2	Joanne Thai 蔡麗欣	Brisbane	Australia	27	5' 5"
3	Ida Duan 段薏丹	Chicago	United States	22	5' 5½"
4	Stephanie Wang 王慧媛	Hawaii	United States	27	5' 7"
5	Hera Chan 陳曉華	Hong Kong	Hong Kong	24	5' 8"
6	Jovane Phang 彭嘉伊	Kuala Lumpur	Malaysia	22	5' 5¾"
7	Lucy Vongpraseuth 妮素達	Laos	Laos	20	5' 2½"
8	Lisa He 賀灕灑	London	United Kingdom	21	5' 5½"
9	Catherine Liang 梁瀅	Los Angeles	United States	19	5' 8"
10	Kitty Huang 黃夢晴	Meizhou	China	21	5' 9½"
11	Finola Xie 謝曉穎	Melbourne	Australia	22	5' 4½"
12	Ivy Hu 胡楠青	Montréal	Canada	17	5' 7¾"
13	Gina Wu 吳雅珠	New York City	United States	25	5' 5"
14	Maggie Huang 黃翠金	San Francisco	United States	27	5' 2½"
15	Michelle Poa 潘明璇	Singapore	Singapore	20	5' 4"
16	Sylvia Zhu 朱彥雙	Sydney	Australia	24	5' 5½"
17	Morgane Yueng 楊美麗	Tahiti	French Polynesia	22	5' 5½"
18	Summer Yang 楊昳譞	Toronto	Canada	26	5' 8"
19	Alice Lin 林昀佳	Vancouver	Canada	27	5' 3"

== Crossovers ==
Contestants who previously competed or will be competing at other international beauty pageants:

Miss International

- 2022: Thailand: Tavee Meesang
