= Miss Chinese International Pageant 2016 =

Beauty Pageant

- Date: January 23, 2016
- Presenters: Carol Cheng, Lawrence Cheng, Luisa Maria Leitão
- Venue: TVB City, Hong Kong
- Broadcaster: TVB
- Entrants: 14
- Placements: 5
- Winner: Jennifer Coosemans 朱亞琳; Vancouver, Canada
- Congeniality: Alice Wong 黃嘉欣; Los Angeles, United States

The 27th Miss Chinese International Pageant, Miss Chinese International Pageant 2016 was held on January 23, 2016. Miss Chinese International 2015 Mandy Chai of Sydney, Australia crowned her successor, Jennifer Coosemans of Vancouver, British Columbia, Canada at the end of the pageant.

== Pageant information ==
The slogan to this year's pageant was "The Soul of Eternal Beauty, Displaying the Features of a Thousand Colours" 「絕美靈魂 流露千色面貌」. Aside from the top 3 placements, Miss Friendship was also awarded. The masters of ceremony this year were Carol Cheng, Lawrence Cheng, and Luisa Maria Leitão. There were two judging panels this year, the Diamond Judging Panel of six male actors and singers, and the Elegant Judging Panel, which consists of twenty past Miss Chinese International Pageant and Miss Hong Kong Pageant contestants. Both judging panels selected the winner and runners-up of the pageant, however, after each round of competition, the top current top 3 rankings from the Elegant Judging Panel were revealed.

With 14 delegates competing, this marks the lowest contestant turnout in the history of the pageant. Contestant number four, Sophia Wu was originally introduced as representing Jiangsu at the initial press conference, but was later changed to representing Nanjing in her profile on the official pageant website. With Cooseman's win, she became Vancouver's seventh Miss Chinese International titleholder.

== Judges ==
=== Diamond Judging Panel ===
- Pakho Chau
- Ruco Chan
- Alex Fong
- Alfred Hui
- Lai Lok-yi
- Sammy Sum

=== Elegant Judging Panel ===
- Océane Zhu, Miss Chinese International 2008
- Christine Kuo, Miss Chinese International 2009
- Gloria Tang, Miss Chinese International 2013
- Grace Chan, Miss Chinese International 2014; Miss Hong Kong 2013
- Kayi Cheung, Miss Chinese International Pageant 2008 First Runner-Up; Miss Hong Kong 2007
- Veronica Shiu, Miss Chinese International Pageant 2015 First Runner-Up; Miss Hong Kong 2014
- Carat Cheung, Miss Chinese International Pageant 2013 Second Runner-Up; Miss Hong Kong 2012
- Janet Chow, Miss Hong Kong Pageant 2006 First Runner-Up
- Jacqueline Wong, Miss Hong Kong Pageant 2012 First Runner-Up
- Sisley Choi, Miss Hong Kong Pageant 2013 First Runner-Up
- Erin Wong, Miss Hong Kong Pageant 2014 First Runner-Up
- Lisa Ch'ng, Miss Hong Kong Pageant 2010 Second Runner-Up
- Whitney Hui, Miss Hong Kong Pageant 2011 Second Runner-Up
- Tracy Chu, Miss Hong Kong Pageant 2012 Second Runner-Up
- Katherine Ho, Miss Hong Kong Pageant 2014 Second Runner-Up
- Mayanne Mak, Miss Hong Kong Pageant 2011 Third Runner-Up
- Jennifer Shum, Miss Hong Kong Pageant 2012 Miss Photogenic
- Samantha Ko, Miss Hong Kong Pageant 2008 Tourism Ambassador Award winner
- Roxanne Tong, Miss Hong Kong Pageant 2012 Tourism Ambassador Award winner
- Pheobe Pang, Miss Hong Kong Pageant 2010 Top 8 Finalist

== Results ==
Placement	Contestant	City Represented	Country Represented
Miss Chinese International 2016	Jennifer Coosemans 朱亞琳	Vancouver	Canada
1st Runner-Up	Mary Chen 陳舒菲	New York City	United States
2nd Runner-Up	Tiana Luan 欒添	Sydney	Australia
Top 5 Finalists	Mint Kongraphan 陳思敏; Sophia Wu 巫雪菲	Bangkok; Nanjing	Thailand; China

=== Special awards ===
Special Awards	Contestant	City/Region Represented	Country Represented
Miss Friendship:	Alice Wong 黃嘉欣	Los Angeles	United States
Most "Liked" Talent Performance	Mary Chen 陳舒菲	New York City	United States

== Contestant list ==
No.	Contestant Name	Represented City	Represented Country	Age	Height
1	Maggie ZHANG 張可懿	Auckland	New Zealand	21	5' 7"
2	Mint KONGRAPHAN 陳思敏	Bangkok	Thailand	20	5' 8½"
3	Louisa MAK 麥明詩	Hong Kong	Hong Kong	24	5' 4½"
4	Sophia WU 巫雪菲	Nanjing	China	20	5' 8½"
5	Janice CHOONG 鍾素敏	Kuala Lumpur	Malaysia	24	5' 8"
6	Alice WONG 黃嘉欣	Los Angeles	USA	23	5' 7½"
7	Helen TRAN 陳海倫	Melbourne	Australia	22	5' 6½"
8	Karinne LEGARE 謝紫薇	Montréal	Canada	21	5' 6"
9	Mary CHEN 陳舒菲	New York City	USA	18	5' 7"
10	Vanessa TAY 鄭雅文	Singapore	Singapore	18	5' 7"
11	Sherry WANG 王嘉燁	Johannesburg	South Africa	21	5' 7"
12	Tiana LUAN 欒添	Sydney	Australia	23	5' 6¼"
13	Sissi KE 柯思懿	Toronto	Canada	23	5' 3½"
14	Jennifer COOSEMANS 朱亞琳	Vancouver	Canada	21	5' 8"

== Crossovers ==
Contestants who previously competed or will be competing at other international beauty pageants:

Miss International

- 2024: Singapore: Vanessa Tiara Tay
