= Miss Chinese International Pageant =

Hong Kong television beauty contest

- 國際中華小姐競選 (2007-2019 國際華裔小姐競選 (1988-2006)
- Abbreviation: MCI, MCIP, 華姐
- Established: 1988; 38 years ago
- Founded at: Hong Kong
- Type: Beauty pageant
- Purpose: Annual beauty pageant to crown the best representative of Chinese beauty from around the globe.
- Official language: Cantonese, Mandarin
- Current title holder: Hera Chan (2019)
- Parent organization: TVB
- Website: http://b.tvb.com/mcip/

Miss Chinese International Pageant
- Traditional Chinese: 國際中華小姐競選
- Simplified Chinese: 国际中华小姐竞选
Transcriptions
Standard Mandarin
- Hanyu Pinyin: Guójì Zhōnghuá xiǎojiě jìngxuǎn
Yue: Cantonese
- Yale Romanization: Gwokjai Jūngwàh síujé gihngsyún
- Jyutping: Gwok^{3}zai^{3} zung^{1}waa^{4} siu^{2}ze^{2} ging^{6}syun^{2}

Former Chinese name
- Traditional Chinese: 國際華裔小姐競選
- Simplified Chinese: 国际华裔小姐竞选
Transcriptions
Standard Mandarin
- Hanyu Pinyin: Guójì huáyì xiǎojiě jìngxuǎn
Yue: Cantonese
- Yale Romanization: Gwokjai wàhyeuih síujé gihngsyún
- Jyutping: Gwok^{3}zai^{3} waa^{4}jeoi^{6} siu^{2}ze^{2} ging^{6}syun^{2}

Shortform name
- Traditional Chinese: 華姐
- Simplified Chinese: 华姐
Transcriptions
Standard Mandarin
- Hanyu Pinyin: Huájiě
Yue: Cantonese
- Yale Romanization: Wàhjé
- Jyutping: Waa^{4}ze^{2}

Miss Chinese International Pageant (Chinese: 國際中華小姐競選, formerly 國際華裔小姐競選), or MCI (Chinese: 華姐) for short, is an annual international beauty pageant, organized and broadcast by TVB, a network television station in Hong Kong. It was established in 1988 and the Chinese name of the pageant was rebranded in 2007.

The current Miss Chinese International is Miss Hong Kong 2018 winner Hera Chan, who was crowned at the Miss Chinese International Pageant 2019.

The 31st Miss Chinese International Pageant of 2020, originally scheduled to take place February 2020, was postponed to 2021 due to the ongoing COVID-19 pandemic.

== Composition ==
Logo of Miss Chinese International Pageant 2007 with the new Chinese title of the pageant.

Logo of Miss Chinese International Pageant 2006 with the old Chinese title of the pageant.

At its inception in 1988, in what was formerly British Hong Kong, delegates were either winners or runners-up of regional Chinese beauty pageants around the world excluding the country of China, as originally, this was a pageant for Chinese delegates from overseas. In 2007, pageant organizers altered the entry requirements to include delegates representing Mainland China. All delegates at the time of the pageant are between the ages at least of 17 and 25, with the upper age limit expanded to 27 in 2012. The delegates must be of at least partial Chinese descent.

In 2009, a record number of 11 delegates came from Mainland China, more than one-third of the total contestant count. The number of China delegates has since decreased, with the 2013 pageant having only one Mainland Chinese delegate, representing Foshan.

=== Chinese name change ===
Starting in 2007, the pageant allowed mainland Chinese participants, and the Chinese name of the pageant changed from 國際華裔小姐競選 (Cantonese: Gwokjai Wayeui Siuje Gingsyun; Mandarin: Guójì huáyì xiǎojiě jìngxuǎn), which literally translated to "Miss International of Chinese Descent Pageant" to 國際中華小姐競選 (Cantonese: Gwokjai Jungwa Siuje Gingsyun (Mandarin: Guójì zhōnghuá xiǎojiě jìngxuǎn) to reflect the change, matching the English pageant title of Miss Chinese International Pageant.

=== Participating regions ===
==== Africa ====
- Johannesburg, South Africa (1989; 1992–1997; 2003; 2006–2007; 2016–2017)

==== The Americas ====
North America

- Calgary, Alberta, Canada (1988–1996, 1998–2005, 2007–2008)
- Chicago, United States (1989–2007, 2009–2015, 2019)
- Edmonton, Alberta, Canada (1988–1993)
- Honolulu, United States (1995; 1997; 1999; 2001–2002; 2018–present)
- Los Angeles, United States (1993–2005; 2013–present)
- Montreal, Quebec, Canada (1988–present)
- New York City, United States (1993–present)
- San Francisco, United States (1988–2010; 2014–2015; 2017-present)
- Scarborough, Ontario, Canada (1988, 1991)
- Seattle, United States (1988–2010; 2013–2015)
- Toronto, Ontario, Canada (1988–present)
- Vancouver, British Columbia, Canada (1988–present)
- Victoria, British Columbia, Canada (1989–1994)

South America

- Lima, Peru (2003–2006)

==== Europe ====
- Amsterdam, Netherlands (2002–2010)
- Frankfurt, Germany (2005)
- The Hague, Netherlands (2002)
- London, England (1988-1991; 1996–2000; 2012; 2019)
- Paris, France (2008)
- Rotterdam, Netherlands (2007)
- Tübingen, Germany (2009)

==== Asia ====
- Bangkok, Thailand (1991–1998; 2000–2008; 2010–2017; 2019)
- Beijing, China (2009-2012)
- Brunei (1993)
- Chongqing, China (2008–2009)
- Dalian, Liaoning, China (2012)
- Foshan, Guangdong, China (2007–2010; 2013–2015; 2017-present)
- Guangdong, China (2007–2012)
- Guangxi, China (2007)
- Hangzhou, China (2008-2009)
- Harbin, China (2009)
- Heilongjiang, China (2009)
- Hong Kong (1988–present)
- Jiangsu, China (2015)
- Ipoh, Malaysia (1993)
- Jilin, China (2009)
- Johor State, Malaysia (1991)
- Kuala Lumpur, Malaysia (1995–present)
- Laos (2018–present)
- Macau (1988–1998; 2009–2010)
- Manila, Philippines (1988–1994; 2000–2013; 2017–2018)
- Nanjing, Jiangsu, China (2009; 2016)
- Nanning, China (2007)
- Penang, Malaysia (1989–1992)
- Quezon City, Philippines (1994)
- Singapore (1988–present)
- Taipei, Chinese Taipei (1988–2006)
- Wuhan, Hubei, China (2009)
- Zhengzhou, Henan, China (2009-2012)

==== Oceania ====
- Auckland, New Zealand (1991-2017)
- Brisbane, Australia (1988–2005; 2019)
- Christchurch, New Zealand (1993)
- Hastings, New Zealand (1989-1991)
- Melbourne, Australia (1988–present)
- Sydney, Australia (1988–present)
- Tahiti, French Polynesia (1988–2010; 2018–present)

=== Pageant timeframe ===
The first two pageants (1988 & 1989) were held in the fourth quarter of the calendar year. However, in 1990, TVB decided to shift the pageant date to the beginning of the year to coincide with Lunar New Year. But since Miss Chinese International Pageant 1989 was not held until mid-December, the 3rd Miss Chinese International Pageant came early 1991 with no pageant being held in 1990. Since then, the pageant was held late January or early February of every year.

In 2010, the pageant reverted to being held in November, delaying the 22nd Miss Chinese International Pageant by almost 10 months. Therefore, Christine Kuo, Miss Chinese International 2009 is the longest serving titleholder, having served 658 days from January 17, 2009 to November 5, 2010. The delay of the pageant meant that several regional titleholders from 2009 were not able to enter Miss Chinese International Pageant 2010 as they have already crowned their successors by November 2010, including Miss Hong Kong 2009 Sandy Lau. Miss Hong Kong Pageant 2010 was held in August and Lau's successor, Toby Chan, represented Hong Kong in Miss Chinese International 2010 instead.

One year later, TVB announced that the 23rd Miss Chinese International Pageant would be delayed until January 15, 2012, meaning that there would be no pageant held in 2011. This is the first time since 1990 a pageant would not be held during a calendar year. As with the year before, several regional titleholders from 2010 would not be able to enter Miss Chinese International Pageant 2012 as they have already crowned their successors by the end of 2011. However, the organizers allowed 2010 regional titleholders from Auckland, Kuala Lumpur, Melbourne, Montreal, Toronto, and Vancouver to compete with their 2011 counterparts in Miss Chinese International 2012, marking a first in the pageant's history where two representatives of the same region compete together.

The 31st Miss Chinese International Pageant was originally scheduled to take place on February 15, 2020 in Hong Kong. However, on January 28, 2020, organizer TVB announced that due to the ongoing COVID-19 pandemic, for the safety of the delegates, crew, and audience, the pageant would be postponed to the year 2021, with the actual date to be announced.

== Results ==
Delegates representing Canadian cities have won 11 iterations of the competition; with Vancouver winning seven titles (2001, 2002, 2004, 2005, 2010, 2013, 2016), Toronto three times (1992, 1997 and 2009) and Montreal once (1993).

Delegates from pageant organizer Hong Kong have won four times (1988, 2000, 2014, 2019), and have recorded the most top three finishes with 19.

Delegates representing New York City, USA have won thrice, first in 1999, followed by back-to-back wins in 2017 and 2018.

=== Major award winners ===
Year	Date	Winner	1st Runner-Up	2nd Runner-Up	Miss Friendship
1988	Oct 2, 1988	Michele Monique Reis; Hong Kong	Tammy Marie Lee; Seattle, USA	Sharon Kwok; San Francisco, USA	Tanya Lim; Calgary, Canada
1989	Dec 17, 1989	Kit Wong; Sydney, Australia	Monica Chan; Hong Kong	Guilhermina Madeira da Silva Pedrugo; Macau	—
1990	Postponed to February, 1991				
1991	Feb 10, 1991	Yen-Thean Leng; Singapore	Anita Yuen; Hong Kong	Hazel Cheung; Montreal, Canada	Deanna Kay Leung; Seattle, USA
1992	Jan 26, 1992	Rosemary Chan; Toronto, Canada	Amy Kwok; Hong Kong	Valerie H. Lee; San Francisco, United States	[Sherine Seng] Auckland, New Zealand
1993	Jan 10, 1993	Christy Chung; Montreal, Canada	Emily Lo; Hong Kong	Elaine Barbara Der; Vancouver, Canada	Stephanie Chang; Seattle, USA
1994	Jan 23, 1994	Saesim Pornapa Sui; Bangkok, Thailand	Diane Wang; New York City, USA	I-Man Chao; Seattle, USA	Marie Catherine Munoz; Manila, Philippines
1995	Jan 22, 1995	Hsiang-Ling Ku; Taipei, Taiwan	Darabhorn Bhakdeeratna; Bangkok, Thailand	Edna Wei; Los Angeles, USA	Gloria Hui; Vancouver, Canada
1996	Jan 27, 1996	Siew-Kee Cheng; Singapore	Melissa Ng; San Francisco, USA	~~Amy Chung~~ (Dethroned)^{[a]} New York City, USA	Winnie Yeung; Hong Kong
1997	Jan 26, 1997	Monica Lo; Toronto, Canada	San San Lee; Hong Kong	Kulsatri Konjanawann; Bangkok, Thailand	Wendy Giam; Kuala Lumpur, Malaysia
1998	Jan 25, 1998	Louisa Luk; San Francisco, USA	Lisa Vongthong; Bangkok, Thailand	Kalyane Tea; Montreal, Canada	May Ling Lai; Chicago, USA
1999	Feb 14, 1999	Michelle Ye; New York City, USA	Janet Huang; Los Angeles, USA	Anne Heung; Hong Kong	Mabel Wong; Calgary, Canada
2000	Feb 6, 2000	Sonija Kwok; Hong Kong	Tiffany Yang; Los Angeles, USA	Crystal Pan; Vancouver, Canada	Jessie Cheng; Melbourne, Australia
2001	Jan 20, 2001	Bernice Liu; Vancouver, Canada	Jennifer Huang; Montreal, Canada	Vivian Lau; Hong Kong	Hsing-Ting Chiang; Taipei, Chinese Taipei
2002	Jan 27, 2002	Shirley Zhou; Vancouver, Canada	Christie Bartram; Toronto, Canada	Angela Foo; Kuala Lumpur, Malaysia	Marjorie Wu; Honolulu, USA
2003	Jan 25, 2003	Rachel Tan; Kuala Lumpur, Malaysia	Tiffany Lam; Hong Kong	Diana Wu; Toronto, Canada	Lola Gong; Amsterdam, Netherlands
2004	Jan 17, 2004	Linda Chung; Vancouver, Canada	Mandy Cho; Hong Kong	Carlene Aguilar; Manila, Philippines	Mandy Cho; Hong Kong
2005	Jan 29, 2005	Leanne Li; Vancouver, Canada	Fala Chen; New York City, USA	Jessica Young; Melbourne, Australia	Jolene Chin; Kuala Lumpur, Malaysia
2006	Jan 21, 2006	Ina Lu; Johannesburg, South Africa	Ginney Kanchanawat; Bangkok, Thailand	Annabelle Kong; Kuala Lumpur, Malaysia	Annabelle Kong; Kuala Lumpur, Malaysia
2007	Jan 20, 2007	Sarah Song; Sydney, Australia	Ivy Lu; Johannesburg, South Africa	Sherry Chen; Toronto, Canada	Parichat Wisuthiphatt; Bangkok, Thailand
2008	Jan 26, 2008	Océane Zhu; Paris, France	Kayi Cheung; Hong Kong	Aileen Xu; Chongqing, China	Delaine Lee; Calgary, Canada
2009	Jan 17, 2009	Christine Kuo; Toronto, Canada	Skye Chan; Hong Kong	Cici Chen; Vancouver, Canada	Skye Chan; Hong Kong
2010	Nov 5, 2010	Eliza Sam; Vancouver, Canada	Belle Theng; Kuala Lumpur, Malaysia	Candy Chang; Toronto, Canada	Lu Bai; Foshan, China
2011	Postponed to January, 2012				
2012	Jan 15, 2012	Kelly Cheung; Chicago, USA	Cheryl Wee; Singapore, Singapore	Lenna Lim; Kuala Lumpur, Malaysia	Ashton Hong; Toronto, Canada
2013	Feb 24, 2013	Gloria Tang; Vancouver, Canada	Denise Camillia Tan; Kuala Lumpur, Malaysia	Carat Cheung; Hong Kong	Lauren Weinberger; Los Angeles, USA
2014	Jan 26, 2014	Grace Chan; Hong Kong	Cindy Zhong; Vancouver, Canada	Lucia Ting-Li Lorigiano; Montreal, Canada	Mandi Cheung; Singapore
2015	Jan 25, 2015	Mandy Chai; Sydney, Australia	Veronica Shiu; Hong Kong	Catherine Hui; New York City, United States	Christina Jin; Auckland, New Zealand
2016	Jan 23, 2016	Jennifer Coosemans; Vancouver, Canada	Mary Chen; New York City, United States	Tiana Luan; Sydney, Australia	Alice Wong; Los Angeles, United States
2017	Jan 15, 2017	Stitch Yu; New York City, United States	Serene Lim; Kuala Lumpur, Malaysia	Crystal Fung; Hong Kong	Adelaide Lee; Johannesburg, South Africa
2018	Feb 3, 2018	Rose Li; New York City, United States	Angela Liu; Los Angeles, United States	Juliette Louie; Hong Kong	Crystal Yang; Hawaii, United States
2019	Mar 2, 2019	Hera Chan; Hong Kong	Stephanie Wang; Hawaii, United States	Gina Wu; New York City, United States	Tavee Meesang; Bangkok, Thailand

Notes

- a In 1999, Amy Chung was stripped of her title of Miss Chinese International 1996 Second Runner-Up and had her artiste contract with TVB terminated when it was discovered that she had an outstanding warrant for her arrest in USA as she left the country to enter the pageant while on probation stemming from a credit card fraud conviction. Chung had also lied about her academic credentials, claiming to have a Masters Degree from Harvard University when she only has taken a course from Harvard Extension School. The title has yet to be filled since.

=== Gallery of Winners ===
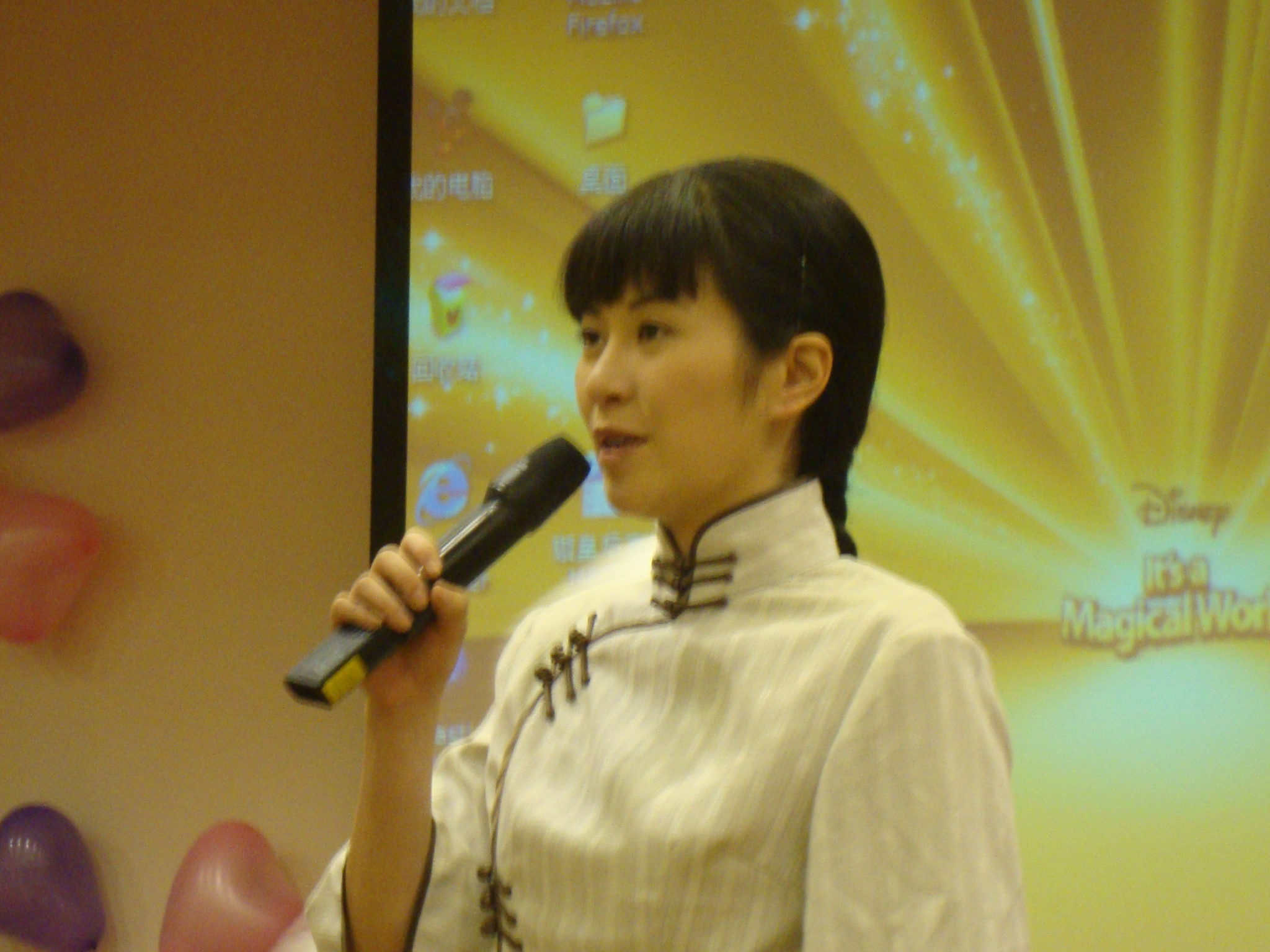
Miss Chinese International 1999
Michelle Ye, New York City, USA

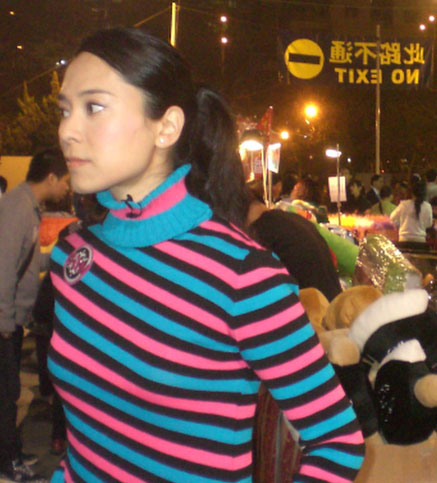
Miss Chinese International 2000
Sonija Kwok, Hong Kong

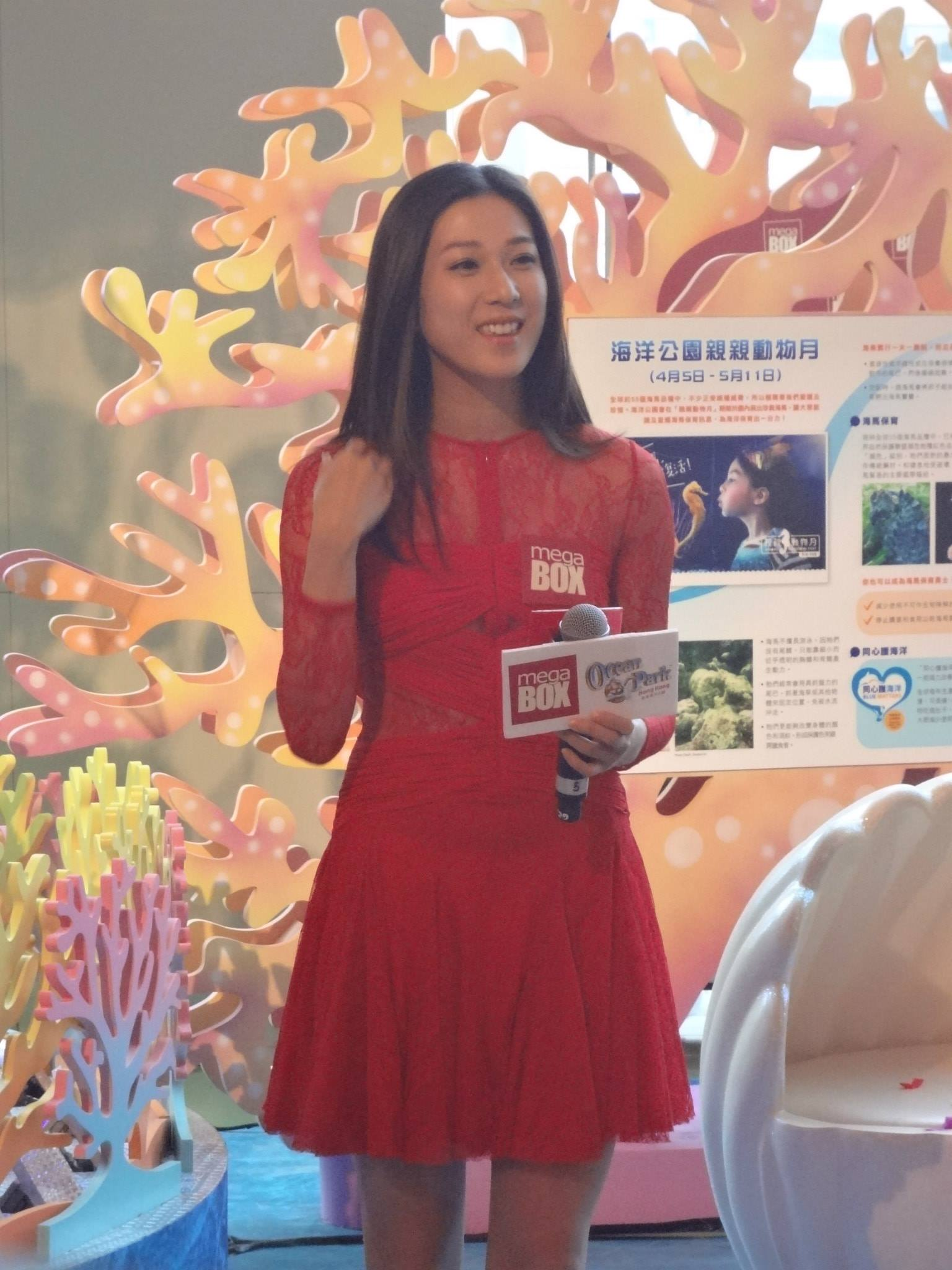
Miss Chinese International 2004
Linda Chung, Vancouver, British Columbia, Canada

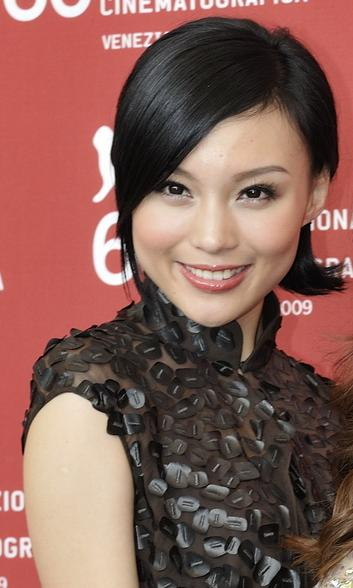
Miss Chinese International 2008
Océane Zhu, Paris, France

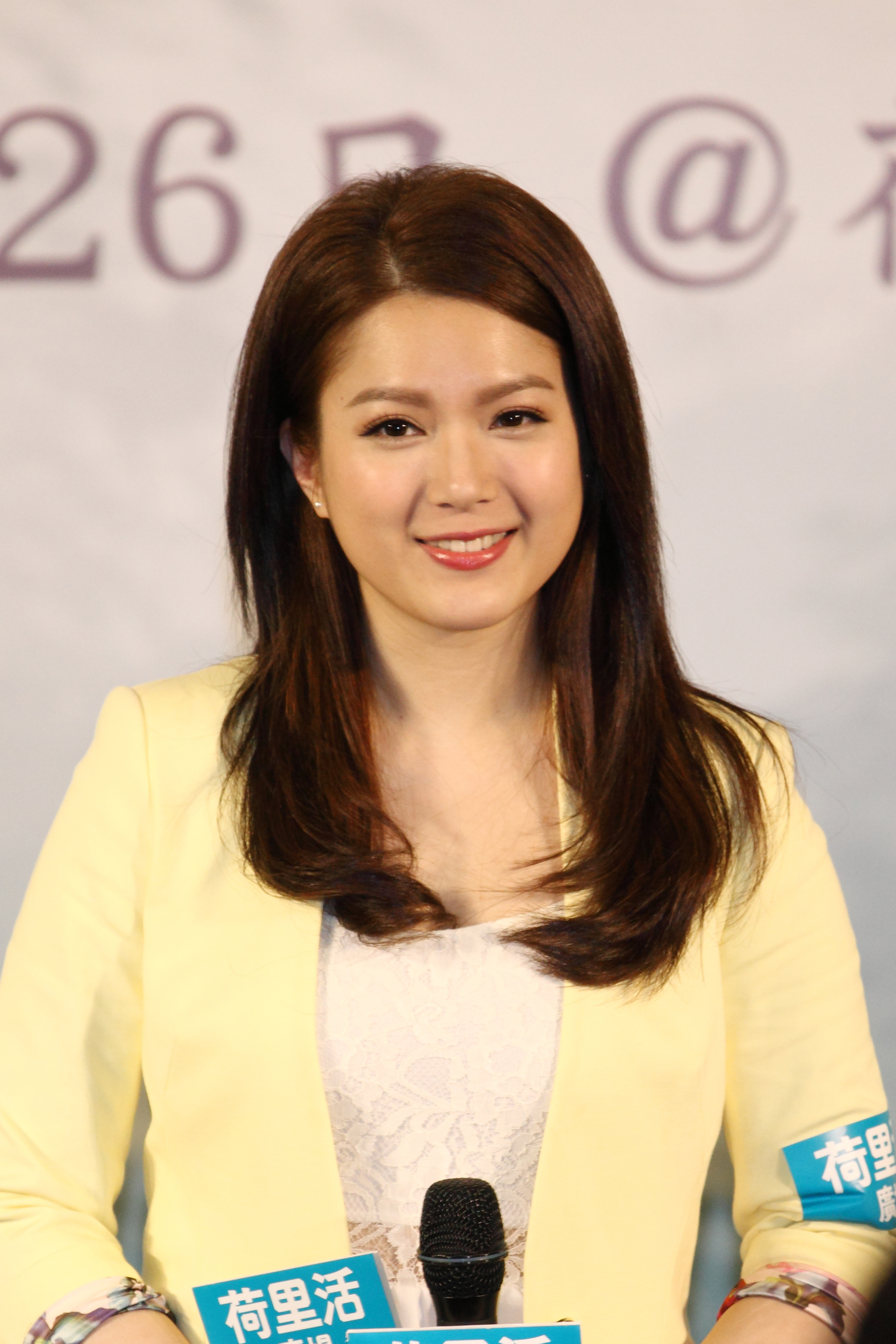
Miss Chinese International 2009
Christine Kuo, Toronto, Ontario, Canada

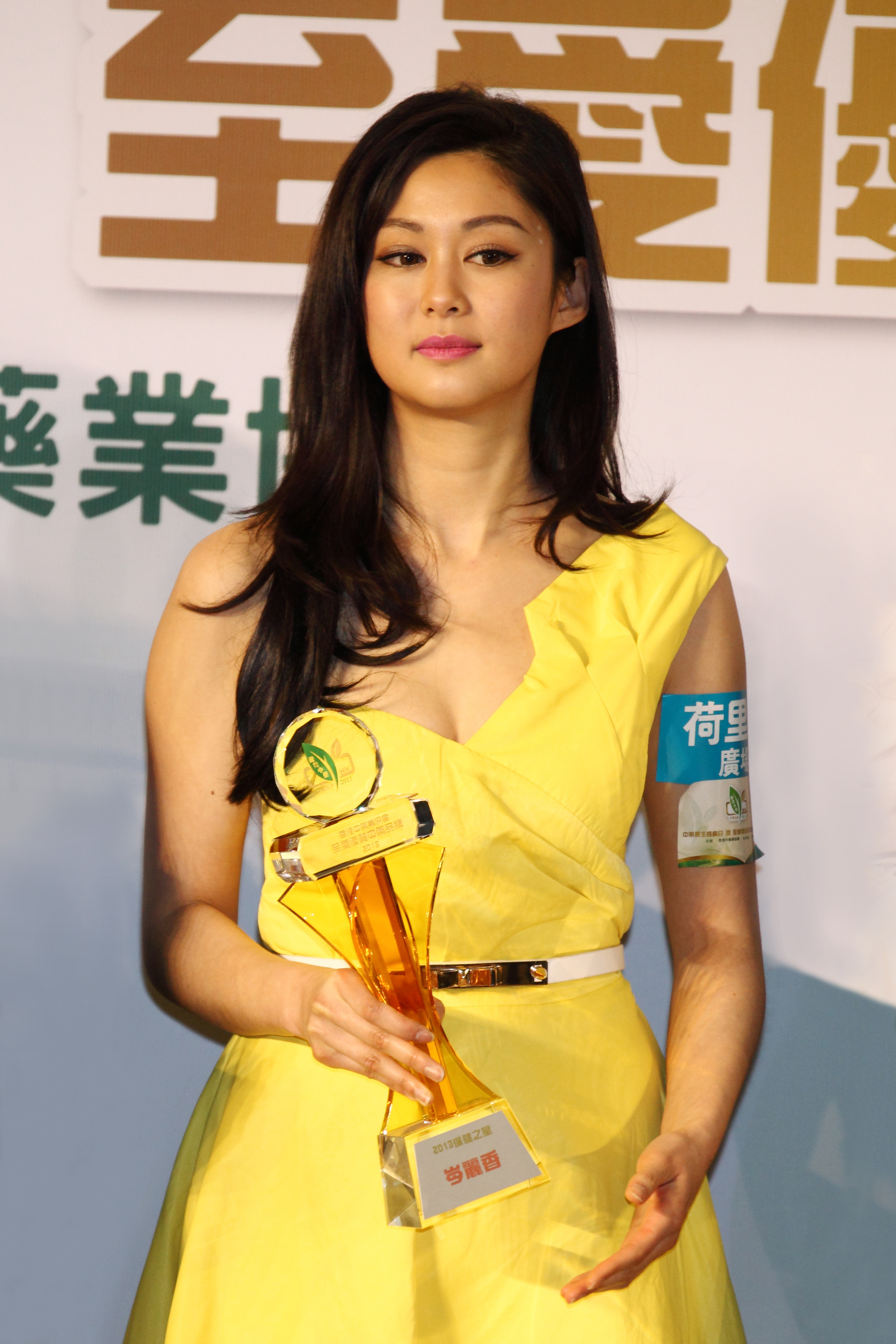
Miss Chinese International 2010
Eliza Sam, Vancouver, British Columbia, Canada
