= Miss Chinese International Pageant 1991 =

- Date: February 10, 1991
- Presenters: Anthony Chan Yau, Philip Chan
- Entertainment: Woo Fung, Hacken Lee, Vivian Chow, Leon Lai, Shirley Kwan, Sam Tsang, David Lui, Monica Chan, Isabel Leung
- Venue: TV City, Hong Kong
- Broadcaster: TVB
- Entrants: 23
- Placements: 12
- Winner: Yen-Thean Leng 凌緣庭; Singapore
- Congeniality: Deanna Leung; Seattle, USA

The 3rd Miss Chinese International Pageant, Miss Chinese International Pageant 1991 was held on February 10, 1991 in Hong Kong. The pageant was supposed to be held in the fall/winter of 1990, but delayed until February 1991 to coincide with Chinese New Year. Since then, the pageant has been held near Chinese New Year up till 2010, when the pageant reverted to being held in the autumn. The pageant was organized and broadcast by TVB in Hong Kong. Miss Chinese International 1989 Kit Wong of Sydney, Australia crowned Singapore's Yen-Thean Leng as the new winner. Five years later, Singapore would win the pageant again.

== Pageant information ==
The theme to this year's pageant continues to be "The Traditions of the Dragon, The Embodiment of Beauty" 「龍的傳統 俏的化身」. The Masters of Ceremonies were Anthony Chan Yau and Philip Chan. The performing guests includes actor Woo Fung; canto-pop singers Hacken Lee, Vivian Chow, Leon Lai, Shirley Kwan, Sam Tsang, David Lui; Miss Hong Kong 1989 and Miss Chinese International Pageant 1989 first runner-up Monica Chan and Miss Hong Kong 1989 second runner-up Isabel Leung.

== Results ==
Placement	Contestant	City Represented	Country Represented
Miss Chinese International 1991	Yen-Thean Leng 凌緣庭	Singapore	Singapore
1st Runner-Up	Anita Yuen 袁詠儀	Hong Kong	Hong Kong
2nd Runner-Up	Hazel Cheung 張燕妮	Montréal	Canada
Top 12 Finalists	Virginia Lin 林芬妮; Sharon Shew 蕭子齡; Sabrina Chen 陳佩芬; Ann Mah 馬彩燕; Anita Jung 鄭慧儀; Chen-Hsien Chiang 江貞嫺; Micaela Mendes 文寶雪; Betty Lum 林雲英; Supaporn Kitty Suksawasdi 蘇潔蒂	Scarborough; Victoria; Taipei; Edmonton; Chicago; Auckland; Macau; Vancouver; Bangkok	Canada; Canada; Taiwan; Canada; USA; New Zealand; Macau; Canada; Thailand

=== Special awards ===
- Miss Friendship: Deanna Leung 梁慧儀 (Seattle)
- Miss Oriential Beauty: Ann Mah 馬彩燕 (Edmonton)
- Miss Charm: Ann Mah 馬彩燕 (Edmonton)

== Contestant list ==
No.	Contestant Name	Represented City	Represented Country	Age
1	Virginia LIN 林芬妮	Scarborough	Canada	21
2	Jenny Hinano JOUFOQUES 余靜蘭	Tahiti	French Polynesia	18
3	Jennie HON 韓宗妮	Toronto	Canada	22
4	Annie TEO 張絲媚	Johor State	Malaysia	22
5	Deanna Kay LEUNG 梁慧儀	Seattle	USA	22
6	Sharon Annette SHEW 蕭子齡	Victoria	Canada	22
7	Sabrina CHEN 陳佩芬	Taipei	Taiwan	24
8	Ann MAH 馬彩燕	Edmonton	Canada	21
9	Anita JUNG 鄭慧儀	Chicago	USA	20
10	Chen-Hsien CHIANG 江貞嫺	Auckland	New Zealand	22
11	Yen-Thean LENG 凌緣庭	Singapore	Singapore	19
12	Terry Linda WOODS 胡泰琍	San Francisco	USA	21
13	Micaela MENDES 文寶雪	Macau	Macau	19
14	Hazel CHEUNG 張燕妮	Montréal	Canada	21
15	Christine CHEONG 張慧君	Melbourne	Australia	22
16	Yvonne HO 何小萍	Calgary	Canada	22
17	Aline PHAM 范愛蓮	Los Angeles	USA	21
18	Monika Van LEE 李雲鳳	London	England	21
19	Bing LIANG 梁冰	Sydney	Australia	20
20	Nancy CHU 朱南茜	Hastings	New Zealand	24
21	Anita YUEN 袁詠儀	Hong Kong	Hong Kong	19
22	Betty LUM 林雲英	Vancouver	Canada	23
23	Supaporn Kitty SUKSAWASDI 蘇潔蒂	Bangkok	Thailand	20

== Crossovers ==
Contestants who previously competed or will be competing at other international beauty pageants:

Miss Universe

- 1991: Hong Kong: Anita Yuen
