= Miss Chinese International Pageant 2015 =

- Date: January 25, 2015
- Presenters: Carol Cheng, Lawrence Cheng, Janis Chan
- Venue: TVB City, Hong Kong
- Broadcaster: TVB
- Entrants: 18
- Placements: 10
- Winner: Mandy Chai 蔡美霆; Sydney, Australia
- Congeniality: Christina Jin 金詩迪; Auckland, New Zealand

The 26th Miss Chinese International Pageant, Miss Chinese International Pageant 2015 was held on January 25, 2015. Miss Chinese International 2014 Grace Chan of Hong Kong crowned her successor, Mandy Chai of Sydney, Australia at the end of the pageant.

== Pageant information ==
The slogan to this year's pageant was "Delicate and Stunning, Chasing the Dream of Beauty" 「玲瓏絕色 唯美追夢」. The masters of ceremony this year were Carol Cheng, Lawrence Cheng, and Janis Chan. Judges included actor Roger Kwok, Miss Hong Kong 1989 Monica Chan, and Miss Hong Kong 1991 Second Runner-Up Ada Choi.

The show also included two guest judging panels that provided their Top 3 Picks throughout the evening. However, their choices are not scored and therefore are not included in the official results. The two panels include the 20-person "Star Judging Panel" that consists of TVB artistes, and a 100-person "Professional Panel" that consists of professionals from the banking, insurance, production, entrepreneurship, fashion, and cosmetic sectors. In addition, the 18 competing delegates also provided with their choices for Top 3, that were announced near the beginning of the programme.

== Results ==
Placement	Contestant	City Represented	Country Represented
Miss Chinese International 2015	Mandy Chai 蔡美霆	Sydney	Australia
1st Runner-Up	Veronica Shiu 邵珮詩	Hong Kong	Hong Kong
2nd Runner-Up	Catherine Hui 惠櫸喬	New York City	United States
Top 5 Finalists	Anjoe Koh 許愫恩; Erica Chen 陳怡靜	Kuala Lumpur; Vancouver	Malaysia; Canada
Top 10 Semi-Finalists	Christina Jin 金詩迪; Isabella Prathaksinkawin 吳紫薇; Katrina Lee 李玉薇; Cindy Ye 葉靈夢竹; Valerie Fong 方詩揚	Auckland; Bangkok; Los Angeles; Melbourne; Toronto	New Zealand; Thailand; United States; Australia; Canada

=== Special awards ===
Special Awards	Contestant	City/Region Represented	Country Represented
Miss Friendship	Christina Jin 金詩迪	Auckland	New Zealand
Best Cultural Costume Interpretation Award	Anjoe Koh 許愫恩	Kuala Lumpur	Malaysia

=== Guest panels Top 3 choices ===
==== Delegates' choices ====
Special Awards	Contestant	City/Region Represented	Country Represented
Delegates' choices	Veronica Shiu 邵珮詩	Hong Kong	Hong Kong
Delegates' choices	Leah Li 李卓兒	Seattle	United States
Delegates' choices	Erica Chen 陳怡靜	Vancouver	Canada

==== Professional Panel's choices ====
Special Awards	Contestant	City/Region Represented	Country Represented
Professional Panel's choices	Isabella Prathaksinkawin 吳紫薇	Bangkok	Thailand
Professional Panel's choices	Veronica Shiu 邵珮詩	Hong Kong	Hong Kong
Professional Panel's choices	Catherine Hui 惠櫸喬	New York City	United States

==== Star Panel's choices ====
Special Awards	Contestant	City/Region Represented	Country Represented
Star Panel's choices	Isabella Prathaksinkawin 吳紫薇	Bangkok	Thailand
Star Panel's choices	Anjoe Koh 許愫恩	Kuala Lumpur	Malaysia
Star Panel's choices	Catherine Hui 惠櫸喬	New York City	United States

== Judges ==
- Roger Kwok - Actor
- Monica Chan - Miss Hong Kong 1989, Miss Chinese International Pageant 1989 First Runner-up
- Ada Choi - Actor, Miss Hong Kong 1991 Second Runner-Up
- Dr. Eddy Li - Council Member, 11th Chinese People's Political Consultative Conference
- Clement Chan - Past President, Hong Kong Institute of Certified Public Accountants

== Contestant list ==
No.	Contestant Name	Represented City	Represented Country	Age	Height
1	Zhengting LU 陸媜婷	Anhui	China	21	5' 5"
2	Christina JIN 金詩迪	Auckland	New Zealand	19	5' 9½"
3	Isabella PRATHAKSINAKWIN 吳紫薇	Bangkok	Thailand	18	5' 6½"
4	Jennifer ZHANG 張羽琪	Chicago	USA	27	5' 5"
5	Holly HE 何麗	Jiangsu	China	24	5' 8"
6	Veronica SHIU 邵珮詩	Hong Kong	Hong Kong	24	5' 5"
7	Anjoe KOH 許愫恩	Kuala Lumpur	Malaysia	24	5' 6½"
8	Katrina LEE 李玉薇	Los Angeles	USA	25	5' 6"
9	Cindy YE 葉靈夢竹	Melbourne	Australia	22	5' 3"
10	Jia LI 李嘉馨	Montréal	Canada	24	5' 5½"
11	Catherine HUI 惠櫸喬	New York City	USA	18	5' 7"
12	Shirley LIU 劉夢穎	San Francisco	USA	23	5' 5½"
13	Leah LI 李卓兒	Seattle	USA	22	5' 5"
14	Tammy NG 黃詩敏	Singapore	Singapore	20	5' 7"
15	Mandy CHAI 蔡美霆	Sydney	Australia	22	5' 4½"
16	Valerie FONG 方詩揚	Toronto	Canada	26	5' 4"
17	Erica CHEN 陳怡靜	Vancouver	Canada	24	5' 7½"
18	Yolanda YEN 嚴蔚	Zhejiang	China	21	5' 6½"
