= Miss Chinese International Pageant 2000 =

- Date: February 6, 2000
- Presenters: Eric Tsang, Jerry Lamb, Anne Heung, Michelle Ye
- Entertainment: Aaron Kwok
- Venue: Caesars Palace, Paradise, Nevada, United States
- Broadcaster: TVB
- Entrants: 19
- Placements: 3
- Winner: Sonjia Kwok; Hong Kong
- Congeniality: Jessie Cheng; Melbourne, Australia

The 12th Miss Chinese International Pageant, Miss Chinese International Pageant 2000 was held on February 6, 2000 in Las Vegas. For the first time ever, the pageant moved out of Hong Kong, and was held at Caesars Palace. Miss Chinese International 1999 Michelle Ye of New York, USA crowned Sonija Kwok of Hong Kong as the new winner. The next time Hong Kong wins the pageant would be Grace Chan in 2014.

== Pageant information ==
The theme to this year's pageant is "The Arrival of the Dragon, The Beauty Pageant of the Millennium" 「龍騰盛世 千禧競艶」. The Masters of Ceremonies were Eric Tsang, Jerry Lamb, as well as Miss Chinese International 1999 Michelle Ye and second runner-up Anne Heung. Special performing guest was cantopop singer Aaron Kwok.

== Results ==
Placement	Contestant	City Represented	Country Represented
Miss Chinese International 2000	Sonjia Kwok 郭羨妮	Hong Kong	Hong Kong
1st Runner-Up	Tiffany Yang 楊康怡	Los Angeles	USA
2nd Runner-Up	Crystal Pan 潘欣欣	Vancouver	Canada

=== Special awards ===
- Miss Friendship: Jessie Cheng 成潔 (Melbourne)
- Miss Internet Popularity: Sonjia Kwok 郭羨妮 (Hong Kong)
- Miss Vegas Gorgeous: Sonjia Kwok 郭羨妮 (Hong Kong)

== Contestant list ==
No.	Contestant Name	Represented City	Represented Country	Age
1	Katie LEUNG 梁燕琦	London	United Kingdom	24
2	Vivi WANG 王婉霏	Taipei	Chinese Taipei	21
3	Tiffany YANG 楊康怡	Los Angeles	USA	19
4	Janet LAO 勞嫣藍	Montréal	Canada	19
5	Karen CHEN 陳媛	San Francisco	USA	21
6	Alina ZHANG 張萌	Sydney	Australia	18
7	Mimi CHEN 陳伊奇	New York City	USA	21
8	Chin-Ee CHONG 張競以	Singapore	Singapore	21
9	Lang SIM 沈木蘭	Calgary	Canada	23
10	Jessie CHENG 成潔	Melbourne	Australia	22
11	Waraporn SIRISIN 李美嫻	Bangkok	Thailand	21
12	Ava CHAN 陳仙仙	Toronto	Canada	18
13	Ivy VONG 黃咪咪	Manila	Philippines	25
14	Angela CHIU 邱文蕙	Chicago	USA	20
15	Crystal PAN 潘欣欣	Vancouver	Canada	20
16	Sonjia KWOK 郭羨妮	Hong Kong	Hong Kong	25
17	Nancy KAO 高子瑛	Seattle	USA	20
18	Philomena HO 何贊妮	Kuala Lumpur	Malaysia	23
19	Alvie LIN 林佩蘭	Brisbane	Australia	22

== Crossovers ==
Contestants who previously competed or will be competing at other international beauty pageants:

Miss Universe

- 1999: Taipei, Chinese Taipei: Vivi WANG
  (representing Chinese Taipei)
- 2000: Hong Kong: Sonija Kwok
- 2004: Sydney, Australia: Alina Zhang
  (representing China)

== Contestant notes ==
-Sonija Kwok went on to Cyprus to compete in the Miss Universe 2000 pageant. She was unplaced, but placed in the top 10 Miss Photogenic online polls. As of 2000, Kwok is also the last representative of Hong Kong to compete in Miss Universe.

-Alina Zhang later became Miss Universe China 2004 and went on to Ecuador to compete in the Miss Universe 2004 pageant. However, she was unplaced. Zhang is the third representative of the mainland China to compete in Miss Universe.
