= Miss Chinese International Pageant 2002 =

2002 beauty pageant in China

- Date: January 27, 2002
- Presenters: Priscilla Ku, Melissa Ng, Gordon Lam
- Venue: Chime-Long Paradise, Guangzhou, China
- Broadcaster: TVB
- Entrants: 19
- Placements: 5
- Winner: Shirley Zhou; Vancouver, Canada
- Congeniality: Marjorie Wu; Honolulu, USA

The 14th Miss Chinese International Pageant, Miss Chinese International 2002 was held in Guangzhou, China. This marked the second time the pageant was held outside Hong Kong. China would not host the pageant again, until 2007. For the first time in history, Vancouver won the title again, for the second consecutive year.

== Pageant information ==
The theme to this year's pageant is "Gathering the Focus of the World, Witnessing the Most Beautiful Chinese" 「世界焦點凝聚 見證最美華裔」. The Masters of Ceremonies include Priscilla Ku, Melissa Ng, and Gordon Lam. This year marks the first year the pageant is held outdoors, at the outdoors performance theatre located in the Changlong Night Zoo inside Chime-Long Paradise.

== Results ==
Placement	Contestant	City Represented	Country Represented
Miss Chinese International 2002	Shirley Zhou 周雪	Vancouver	Canada
1st Runner-Up	Christie Bartram 白穎茵	Toronto	Canada
2nd Runner-Up	Angela Foo 符愫娛	Kuala Lumpur	Malaysia
Top 5 Finalists	Shirley Yeung 楊思琦; Jenny Gu 顧颭	Hong Kong; Chicago	Hong Kong; USA

=== Special awards ===
- Miss Friendship: Marjorie Wu 胡凱欣 (Honolulu)
- Miss Svelte Beauty: Christie Bartram 白穎茵 (Toronto)
- Miss Modern China: Shirley Yeung 楊思琦 (Hong Kong)
- Miss Beauty and the Beast: Shirley Zhou 周雪 (Vancouver)

== Contestant list ==
No.	Contestant Name	Represented City	Represented Country	Age	Chinese Origin
1	Marjorie WU 胡凱欣	Honolulu	USA	23	Zhongshan
2	Vicky HAN 郝書婷	Taipei	Chinese Taipei	23	Taiwan
3	Titaua LAUX 劉金燕	Tahiti	French Polynesia	19	Guangdong
4	Beverly CHEN 陳思羽	Melbourne	Australia	23	Taiwan
5	Christie BARTRAM 白穎茵	Toronto	Canada	18	Shunde
6	Julieanna LAW 羅婷婷	Montréal	Canada	18	Hakka
7	Shirley ZHOU 周雪	Vancouver	Canada	20	Beijing
8	Pattareeya THANITANONT 王麗君	Bangkok	Thailand	23	Shantou
9	Hsiao Han CHANG 張少涵	Brisbane	Australia	21	Taipei
10	Pearl TSANG 曾曉妍	Calgary	Canada	22	Shunde
11	Meng Jun YANG 楊夢珺	The Hague	Netherlands	21	Zhejiang
12	Shirley YEUNG 楊思琦	Hong Kong	Hong Kong	23	Meixian
13	Diane YU 楊如依	Manila	Philippines	22	Shanghai
14	Jenny GU 顧颭	Chicago	USA	22	Beijing
15	Ada LIU 劉梓嬌	Sydney	Australia	18	Beijing
16	Lisa HUANG 黃淑君	Singapore	Singapore	19	Guangdong
17	Michelle LUM 林美儀	San Francisco	USA	21	Xinhui
18	Angela FOO 符愫娛	Kuala Lumpur	Malaysia	24	Hainan
19	Pamela WOON 溫美玲	Seattle	USA	23	Taishan

== Crossovers ==
Contestants who previously competed or will be competing at other international beauty pageants:

Miss World

- 2000: Taipei, Chinese Taipei: Vicky HAN
  (representing Chinese Taipei)
- 2004: Singapore: Lisa Huang

Miss Universe

- 2003: Melbourne, Australia: Beverly Chen
  (representing Chinese Taipei)

== Contestant notes ==
- Beverly Chen went on to compete in Miss Universe 2003 in Panama. She was involved in a scandal over her sash, as she was requested to wear a sash named "Chinese Taipei", rather than "Taiwan."
- Lisa Huang went on to Sanya, China, to compete in Miss World 2004.
