= Miss Chinese International Pageant 1998 =

- Date: January 25, 1998
- Presenters: Eric Tsang, Lydia Shum, Emil Chau
- Entertainment: Emil Chau, Eason Chan, Edmond Leung, Miriam Yeung
- Venue: TVB City, Hong Kong
- Broadcaster: TVB
- Entrants: 17
- Placements: 5
- Winner: Louisa Luk; San Francisco, USA
- Congeniality: May Ling Lai; Chicago, USA

Miss Chinese International Pageant 1998 was held on January 25, 1998, in Hong Kong. It was the tenth annual pageant, and had 17 contestants.

The pageant was broadcast live through TVB and was streamed for the first time in Malaysia. Miss Chinese International 1997 Monica Lo of Toronto, Ontario, Canada crowned Louisa Luk of San Francisco, USA as the new winner. Luk is the first winner from the United States and San Francisco's only winner, as of 2010.

== Pageant information ==
The theme to the 1998 pageant was "Beautiful Shadows from The Land of the Gods, Ten Years of Love from the Dragons" 「神洲儷影 十載龍情. It also marked the tenth anniversary of the Miss Chinese International Pageant. The Masters of Ceremonies were Eric Tsang, Lydia Shum, and mandopop singer Emil Chau, who also served as the special performing guest. Other performing guests included cantopop singers Eason Chan, Edmond Leung and Miriam Yeung.

=== 10th anniversary guests ===
To celebrate the 10th anniversary of the pageant, the organizers invited ten past award winners as special guests, who took part in an opening ceremony for the show. The list includes:

- Kit Wong 黃美潔 (Sydney, Australia), Miss Chinese International 1989
- Mina Pedruco 畢美娜 (Macau), 1989 Second Runner-Up
- Yen-Thean Leng 凌緣庭 (Singapore), Miss Chinese International 1991
- Siew-Kee Cheng 鍾秀枝 (Singapore), Miss Chinese International 1996
- Melissa Ng 吳美珩 (San Francisco, USA), 1996 First Runner-Up
- Amy Chung 鍾慧儀 (New York City, USA), 1996 Second Runner-Up
- Winnie Yeung 楊婉儀 (Hong Kong), 1996 Miss Friendship
- Monica Lo 盧淑儀 (Toronto, Ontario, Canada), Miss Chinese International 1997
- San San Lee 李珊珊 (Hong Kong), 1997 First Runner-Up

== Results ==
Placement	Contestant	City Represented	Country Represented
Miss Chinese International 1998	Louisa Luk 陸依薩	San Francisco	USA
1st Runner-Up	Satita Vongthong 蔡明真	Bangkok	Thailand
2nd Runner-Up	Kalyane Tea 譚慧玲	Montréal	Canada
Top 5 Finalists	Joey Tan 陳英麗; Virginia Yung 翁嘉穗	Kuala Lumpur; Hong Kong	Malaysia; Hong Kong

=== Special awards ===
- Miss Friendship: May Ling Lai 黎美齡 (Chicago)
- Best National Costume: Lisa Vongthong 蔡明真 (Bangkok)
- Miss Motherland Beauty: Louisa Luk 陸依薩 (San Francisco)

=== Viewer's Voting Top 5 delegates ===
- Linda Chung 鍾玲玲 (Los Angeles)
- Joey Tan 陳英麗 (Kuala Lumpur)
- Cecilia Wang 王瑾 (Calgary)
- Virginia Yung 翁嘉穗 (Hong Kong)
- Dina Goh 戈婷 (Vancouver)

== Contestant list ==
No.	Contestant Name	Represented City	Represented Country	Age
1	Linda CHUNG 鍾玲玲	Los Angeles	USA	22
2	Joey TAN 陳英麗	Kuala Lumpur	Malaysia	20
3	Lucienda JOUTAIN 余瑞玉	Tahiti	French Polynesia	25
4	May Ling LAI 黎美齡	Chicago	USA	20
5	Cecilia WANG 王瑾	Calgary	Canada	23
6	Bridgett ENG 伍綺喬	Seattle	USA	20
7	Virginia YUNG 翁嘉穗	Hong Kong	Hong Kong	23
8	Julia FONG 房翠麗	Toronto	Canada	23
9	Dina GOH 戈婷	Vancouver	Canada	18
10	Joanna SUTHERBY 黃惠玲	London	United Kingdom	21
11	Sharon CHEUNG 張嘉倩	Sydney	Australia	21
12	Vivian CHEN 陳穎慧	Taipei	Chinese Taipei	17
13	Satita VONGTHONG 蔡明真	Bangkok	Thailand	18
14	Louisa LUK 陸依薩	San Francisco	USA	18
15	Agnes LO 羅慧雲	Macau	Macau	23
16	Kalyane TEA 譚慧玲	Montréal	Canada	20
17	Sue PAN (Suriyanti SUGIANTO) 潘少瑜	Singapore	Singapore	24

== Crossovers ==
Contestants who previously competed or will be competing at other international beauty pageants:

Miss World

- 1997: Macau : Agnes LO

Miss Universe

- 1998: Hong Kong: Virginia Yung
