= Skye Chan =

Hong Kong actress

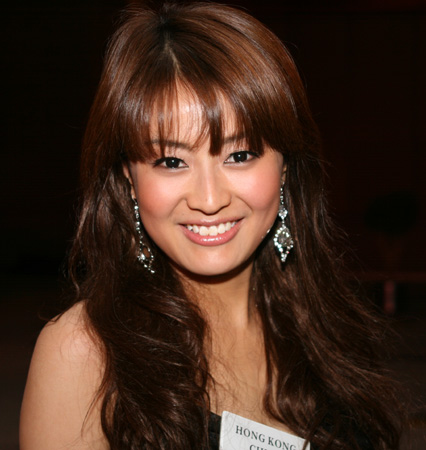
- Chan at Miss World 2008
- Born: Chan Sin-yeung; October 13, 1983 (age 42); British Hong Kong
- Spouse: Chan Ho-yin (m. 2010)

Skye Chan
- Traditional Chinese: 陳倩揚
- Simplified Chinese: 陈倩扬
Transcriptions
Standard Mandarin
- Hanyu Pinyin: Chén Qiànyáng
Yue: Cantonese
- Jyutping: Chan4 Sin6 Yeung4

Skye Chan (Chinese: 陳倩揚; Jyutping: can4 sin6 joeng4, born October 13, 1983) is a Hongkonger actress and beauty pageant titleholder who placed 1st runner-up at Miss Hong Kong 2008. She represented Hong Kong in Miss World 2008 where she did not even win a place, but in Miss Chinese International 2009, she was crowned 1st runner-up. Following her win, she became an actress for TVB and a language translator, as she can speak English, Japanese, Mandarin and Cantonese.

Before her current career, Chan was a flight attendant with Cathay Pacific and studied at Chinese University of Hong Kong.

== Filmography ==
Year	Name of Film	Role	Notes
2010	Some Day	Bernice	2 episodes
2011	Relic of an Emissary	Tsui Yee-wah	
2011	Yes, Sir. Sorry, Sir!	Macy	1 episode
2011	Men with No Shadows	Iris	
2011	The Queen of All		
2012	Friendly Fire	Celine	
2013	Triumph in the Skies II	Joanne	
2014	Shades of Life	Lau Siu Wan	1 episode
2014	Line Walker	Ada Tse	
2015	Four Girls, Three Bars		
2015	Raising the Bar	Sabrina Fong Tin-na	
2016	Between Love & Desire	Wong Hiu-ting	
