= Miss Chinese International Pageant 1988 =

- Date: October 2, 1988
- Presenters: Lydia Shum, Philip Chan
- Entertainment: Leslie Cheung
- Venue: Lee Theatre, Hong Kong
- Broadcaster: TVB
- Entrants: 17
- Placements: 3
- Winner: Michelle Reis; Hong Kong
- Congeniality: Tanya Lim; Calgary, Canada
- Photogenic: Michelle Reis; Hong Kong

Miss Chinese International Pageant 1988, the 1st Miss Chinese International Pageant was held on October 2, 1988 in Hong Kong. The pageant was organized and broadcast by TVB in Hong Kong. At the end of the pageant, Run Run Shaw crowned Michelle Reis of Hong Kong as the first Miss Chinese International. Hong Kong would not win the pageant, until 12 years later when Sonija Kwok won the crown in 2000.

== Pageant information ==
The theme to this year's pageant is "Chinese Light Shines Throughout the World, TVB Makes New History" 「華裔光采耀全球 無線電視創新猶」. The Masters of Ceremonies were Lydia Shum and Philip Chan. Special performing guest was cantopop singer Leslie Cheung. This is the first year of the pageant, which made history as the first ever international Chinese pageant.

== Results ==
Placement	Contestant	City Represented	Country Represented
Miss Chinese International 1988	Michelle Reis 李嘉欣	Hong Kong	Hong Kong
1st Runner-Up	Tammy Marie Lee 李玉蘭	Seattle	USA
2nd Runner-Up	Sharon Kwok 郭秀雲	San Francisco	USA

=== Special awards ===
- Miss Friendship: Tanya Lim 林綺梅 (Calgary)
- Miss Photogenic: Michelle Reis 李嘉欣 (Hong Kong)

== Contestant list ==
No.	Contestant Name	Represented City	Represented Country	Age
1	Mai MARK 麥宛美	Toronto	Canada	20
2	Tammy Marie LEE 李玉蘭	Seattle	USA	20
3	Stephanie CHAN 陳馥荃	Melbourne	Australia	19
4	Hong XU 徐泓	London	United Kingdom	22
5	Sandy HO 何雪儀	Vancouver	Canada	22
6	Hinano JONC 張麗雅	Tahiti	French Polynesia	25
7	Jasmine NG 黃海蓮	Singapore	Singapore	24
8	Sharon KWOK 郭秀雲	San Francisco	USA	18
9	Michelle Monique REIS 李嘉欣	Hong Kong	Hong Kong	18
10	Vivian TANG 唐惠隱	Montréal	Canada	18
11	Sally Louise CHAN 陳少蘭	Brisbane	Australia	18
12	Marina BENIPAYO 彭美玉	Manila	Philippines	20
13	Rebecca CHAW 趙英華	Taipei	Taiwan	20
14	Tanya LIM 林綺梅	Calgary	Canada	24
15	Julie LEE 李瑞蓮	Scarborough	Canada	21
16	Helena da Conceição LO BRANCO 白海倫	Macau	Macau	19
17	(To Ying YIU) 姚道瑩	Sydney	Australia	21

== Crossovers ==
Contestants who previously competed or will be competing at other international beauty pageants:

Miss World

- 1988: Hong Kong: Michelle Reis
- 1988: Macau : Helena da Conceição Lo Branco
- 1992: Manila, Philippines: Marina Benipayo
  (representing Philippines)

Miss Wonderland

- 1989: Macau : Helena da Conceição Lo Branco
