= Kelly Cheung =

American actress

- 張曦雯
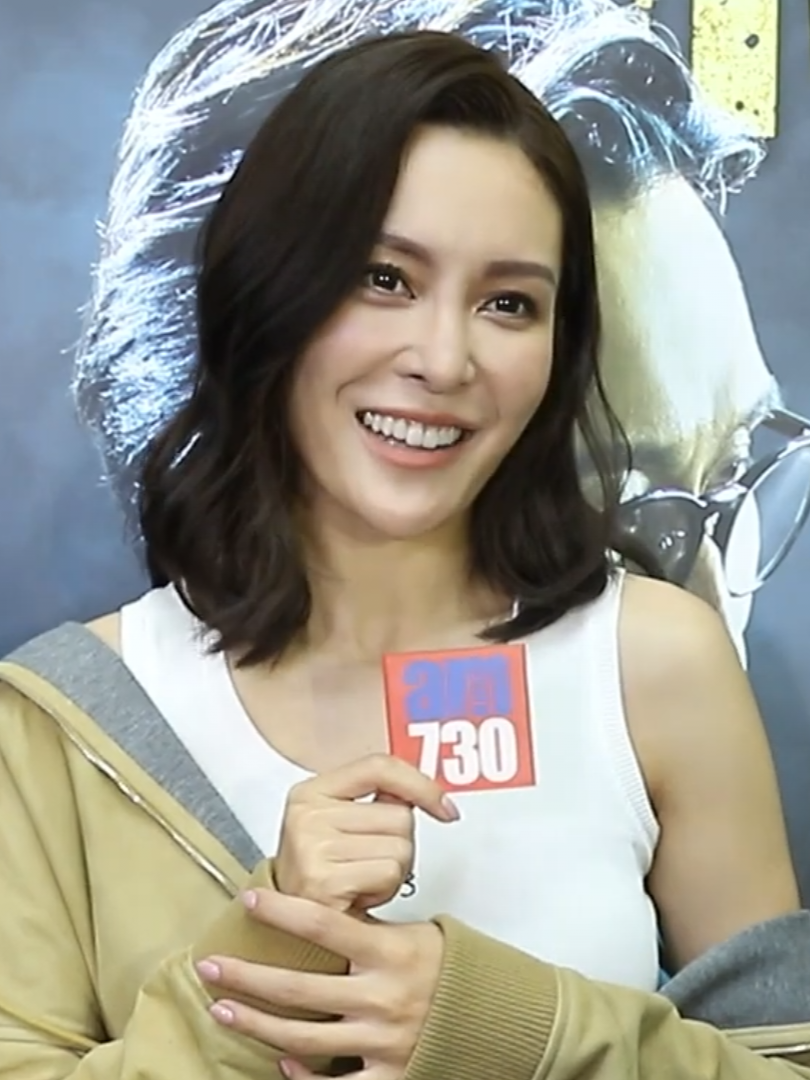
- Cheung in February 2024
- Born: Cheung Wing-yan; 11 May 1990 (age 36); British Hong Kong
- Citizenship: United States; Hong Kong
- Education: University of Illinois Chicago (BBA)
- Occupations: Model; television host; actress
- Years active: 2012–present
- Notable work: Life on the Line; Big White Duel series
- Awards: Miss Friendship Ambassador Pageant 2011 & Miss Photogenic; Miss Chinese International Pageant 2012; TVB Anniversary Awards – Most Improved Female Artiste; 2019 Big White Duel, Barrack O'Karma, The Man Who Kills Trouble, 12 Summers

Chinese name
- Traditional Chinese: 張曦雯
- Simplified Chinese: 张曦雯
Transcriptions
Standard Mandarin
- Hanyu Pinyin: Zhāng Xīwén
Yue: Cantonese
- Jyutping: zoeng1 hei1 man4

Kelly Cheung (Chinese: 張曦雯; pinyin: Cheung Hei-Man, born 11 May 1990) is a Hongkonger-American actress, tv host and beauty pageant titleholder. She currently contracted to TVB. She is the winner of Miss Chinese International 2012 and represented Hong Kong at Miss World 2012.

== Early life and personal life ==
Cheung was born in Hong Kong and was raised there until she was ten years old before moving to Chicago where she attended St. Therese Chinese Catholic School and later graduated from University of Illinois Chicago with a degree in Business Administration.

Mark Brunyez of American and Japanese descent, have been dating for 6 years. The couple met in the United States, Kelly’s home country, prior to her entry into the Miss Chinese International Pageant. They had stayed in touch as friends for many years, before deciding to take their relationship to the next step in 2018. 2

== Career ==
Cheung was 21 when she won the Miss Friendship Ambassador Pageant and represented Chicago at Miss Chinese International 2012. She was crowned the winner, becoming the only Chicago representative to have won the beauty pageant title. She was the winner of Friendship Ambassador as well. Cheung represented Hong Kong, at Miss World 2012 in Ordos, Inner Mongolia, marking the first time a Miss Chinese International titleholder represented Hong Kong at Miss World instead of a Miss Hong Kong Pageant titleholder. This was due to the Miss World pageant timeframe shifting from November to August and thus conflicting with that of Miss Hong Kong Pageant. At Miss World Pageant 2012, Cheung entered top 47 in Top Model and top 40 in Beach Fashion.

Cheung relocated to Hong Kong and joined TVB after crowning her successor at Miss Chinese International in January 2013. With her fluent English, she joined the English language channel TVB Pearl and TVB Jade as a television presenter, hosting Dolce Vita and Pearl Entertainment Tonight, and Scoop (東張西望).

Cheung also had a successful modeling career prior to her pageant wins. She was awarded "Best New Model 2010" by Elite HK Model Management. She had appeared in numerous television commercials as well as featuring in fashion and beauty magazines.

In 2016, Cheung made her acting debut in the legal drama Law dis-Order. In 2019, she starred in the critical acclaimed medical drama Big White Duel, receiving attention from netizens. She gained recognition by winning the Most Improved Female Artiste award at the 2019 TVB Anniversary Awards.

== Filmography ==
=== Television dramas (TVB) ===
| Year | Title | Role | Notes |
|---|---|---|---|
| 2016 | Law dis-Order | Libby Poon Hei-man | Supporting Role |
| 2017 | The Adopt | Chow Yu-tung | |
| 2018 | The Taxorcist Sidequel - Chapter One | Law Ka | Web Miniseries |
| 2018 | Life on the Line | Man" Mandy Man Fai | Major Supporting Role |
| 2018 | Wife, Interrupted | Ting Ka-yan | Guest Appearance |
| 2019 | Big White Duel | Dr. "Yan" Lui Ngoi-ling | Main Role TVB Anniversary Award for Most Improved Female Artiste |
| 2019 | Barrack O'Karma | Kelly Cheung Hei-man (herself) | Ep. 17–18, 20 TVB Anniversary Award for Most Improved Female Artiste |
| 2019 | The Man Who Kills Troubles | Chloe Ko Hei-yi | Major Supporting Role TVB Anniversary Award for Most Improved Female Artiste |
| 2020 | Forensic Heroes IV | Emma Ma Oi-mei / Ko Sin | Ep. 25–30 |
| 2020 | The Witness | Chris Lee Chung-ying | Main Role |
| 2020 | Legal Mavericks 2020 | Eva Shaw Mei-na | Main Role |
| 2021 | Armed Reaction 2021 | Barrister | Ep. 30 |
| 2021 | Shadow of Justice | Cathy Fong Lok-yi | Guest Appearance |
| 2022 | Big White Duel II | Dr. "Yan" Lui Ngoi-ling | Main Role |
| 2023 | Narcotics Heroes | Jackie Ting Yeuk-ning, Senior Inspector of Narcotics Bureau | Main Role |
| 2024 | In Bed With A Stranger | Rachel Chu Sin-mei | Main Role |
| 2024 | Big Biz Duel | Song Kiu | Main Role |

=== Television dramas (Shaw Brothers Pictures) ===
| Year | Title | Role | Notes |
|---|---|---|---|
| 2019 | Flying Tiger 2 | Jean Yau Ho-yuet | Main Role |

== Awards and nominations ==
| Year | Award | Role | Result |
|---|---|---|---|
| 2011 | Miss Friendship Ambassador Pageant & Miss Photogenic | | Won |
| 2012 | Miss Chinese International Pageant | | Won |
| 2018 | TVB Anniversary Award for Most Improved Female Artiste | | Nominated |
| 2018 | TVB Anniversary Award for Best Supporting Actress | | Nominated (Top 5) |
| 2018 | TVB Anniversary Award for Most Popular Female Character | | Nominated |
| 2018 | TVB Anniversary Award for Favourite TVB Actress in Malaysia | | Nominated |
| 2018 | TVB Anniversary Award for Favourite TVB Actress in Singapore | | Nominated |
| 2018 | People's Choice Television Award for Most Improved Female Artiste | | Nominated (Ranked 5th) |
| 2019 | TVB Anniversary Award for Most Improved Female Artiste | | Won |
| 2019 | TVB Anniversary Award for Best Actress | | Nominated |
| 2019 | TVB Anniversary Award for Most Popular Female Character | | Nominated |
| 2019 | People's Choice Television Award for Most Improved Female Artiste | | Nominated (Ranked 4th) |
| 2020 | TVB Anniversary Award for Best Actress | | Nominated |
| 2020 | TVB Anniversary Award for Most Popular Female Character | | Nominated (Top 5) |
| 2020 | TVB Anniversary Award for Favourite TVB Actress in Malaysia | | Nominated (Top 5) |
| 2022 | TVB Anniversary Award for Best Actress | | Nominated (Top 10) |
| 2022 | TVB Anniversary Award for Most Popular Female Character | | Nominated |
| 2022 | TVB Anniversary Award for Favourite TVB Actress in Malaysia | | Nominated |
| 2022 | TVB Anniversary Award for Most Popular Onscreen Partnership (with Roger Kwok) | | Nominated |
| 2023 | TVB Anniversary Award for Best Actress | | Nominated |
| 2024 | TVB Anniversary Award for Favourite TVB Actress in Malaysia | Song Kiu in Big Biz Duel | Won |
| 2024 | TVB Anniversary Award for Best Actress | Song Kiu in Big Biz Duel | Nominated (Top 5) |

| Preceded by Eliza Sam | Miss Chinese International; 2012 | Succeeded by Gloria Tang (actress) |
