= Océane Zhu =

Chinese model, beauty queen, and actress

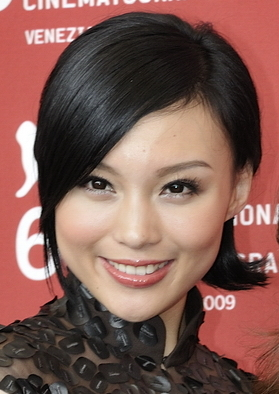
- Zhu in 2009
- Born: 4 April 1987 (age 39); Beijing, China
- Occupation: Actress
- Years active: 2008–present
- Spouse: Unknown (m. 2018)
- Children: 2

Chinese name
Transcriptions
Standard Mandarin
- Hanyu Pinyin: Zhū Xuán
Yue: Cantonese
- Jyutping: zyu1 syun4

Océane Zhu Xuan (born 4 April 1987) is a Chinese model, former beauty queen, and actress based in Hong Kong. She joined TVB in 2009 and left in 2015 to explore a career in Mainland China, later focusing on family life.

== Life and career ==
=== Early life ===
Zhu was born and raised in Beijing. Both her parents served in the Chinese Army. As a child she developed a strong interest in the performing arts and fashion, often participating in school plays and modeling events. By her teenage years she had already been modeling part-time, appearing in local fashion shows and advertisements. At seventeen her parents gave her the choice of joining the military or studying abroad; she chose to pursue her dreams in the performing arts. She moved to Paris to study acting at the Cours Florent, a private French drama school, graduating in 2010 and becoming fluent in French.

=== 2006–2008: Modeling career ===
Before entering beauty pageants, Zhu worked professionally as a model in Paris for fashion runway shows, print advertisements, and magazine spreads. She caught the attention of talent scouts and pageant organizers, whose opportunities gave her additional exposure and more confidence on stage. She was often praised for her poise, elegance, and multilingual abilities in Mandarin, French, and English, which would later aid her in international competitions.

=== 2008: Miss China Europe and Miss China International ===
While studying in Paris, she participated in the Miss China Europe 2008 pageant and won. She then represented Paris in the Miss China International 2008 pageant in Hong Kong, also winning the title. Like other pageant winners in Hong Kong, she was offered a contract to act with TVB, marking the start of her acting career.

=== 2009–2015: TVB era and departure ===
Zhu joined TVB in 2009 and made her official Hong Kong debut in 2010 in the drama Some Day. She also appeared in the Taiwanese historical drama Prince of Tears (2009). Despite her training, her limited Cantonese fluency meant she usually played supporting roles. During her seven-year tenure at TVB she appeared in dramas such as Twilight Investigation, 7 Days in Life, Be Home for Dinner, The Life and Times of a Sentinel, Super Snoops, and Ad Mania. By October 2015 Océane declared she was leaving TVB. Her contract was expiring and she decided not to renew; opting to explore new prospects in China.

=== 2015–present: Mainland China career and family life ===
After leaving TVB in 2015 Zhu focused on Mainland Chinese projects, including films, web series, and independent productions. Notable appearances include 爸爸是條龍 (2018), 新六指琴魔 (2019), 小馬‧弗洛伊德 (2020), and 極限拯救 (2021).

In September 2018 she married a second-generation wealthy businessman from Mainland China in Belgium. She has since focused on family life with raising two children and has maintained a low profile. As of 2025 she has not returned to any major acting roles in Hong Kong or China, though she has made occasional appearances at private events.

== Filmography ==
=== Film ===
Year	Title	Role	Notes
2009	Prince of Tears	Jin Wanping	Nominated — Hong Kong Film Award for Best New Performer; Nominated — Asian Film Awards for Best New Performer
2010	Perfect Wedding	Fanny	
2012	Cross	Lee's wife	
2015	Triumph in the Skies	Winnie	
2016	Line Walker	CIB Detective (cameo)	
2017	The Bittersweet		
2018	爸爸是條龍		
2019	新六指琴魔		
2020	小馬‧弗洛伊德		Netflix release
2021	極限拯救	Mother	Web film

=== Television dramas ===
Year	Title	Role	Notes
2010	Some Day	Shuang	Cameo (episode 118)
2010	Twilight Investigation	Nip Bing	
2011	7 Days in Life	Yao Dan	
2011	Be Home for Dinner	Susan Nin So-shan	Sitcom regular
2011	The Life and Times of a Sentinel	Consort Tung-ngok	2 episodes
2011	Super Snoops	Chu Ka-bik	
2011	Ad Mania	Pang Ruolin	
2012	When Heaven Burns	Angus Sung's girlfriend	Cameo (episode 30)
2012	Queens of Diamonds and Hearts	Leng Lei	Cameo (episode 22)
2012	King Maker	Lei Oi-oi	
2012–2015	Come Home Love	Shum Shui-ching	Series recurring character
2013	Season of Love	Yoyo	Episodes 1–5: "Chapter of Spring"
2013	Sergeant Tabloid	Constable Lam Oi-oi	Previously warehoused; released overseas April 2012
2013	A Great Way to Care II	To Man-wai	
2013	Slow Boat Home	Don Man Wing-tung	
2013	A Change of Heart	Christina. J	Episode 12
2013	Triumph in the Skies II	Kate	Episodes 1 & 2
2014	Shades of Life	Wong Mei-fan	Episode 2
2015	Romantic Repertoire	To Chi-chin	
2016	Captain of Destiny	Wu So-na	

Preceded by Sarah Song	Miss Chinese International; 2008	Succeeded by Christine Kuo
