= Miss Chinese International Pageant 2010 =

- Date: November 5, 2010
- Presenters: Carol Cheng, Derek Li, Jin Liu
- Entertainment: Raymond Lam, Leo Ku, Eliza Chan, Liu Xuan
- Venue: Tianjin Goldin Metropolitan Hotel, Tianjin, China
- Broadcaster: TVB
- Entrants: 24
- Placements: 12
- Winner: Eliza Sam 岑麗香; Vancouver, Canada
- Congeniality: Lu Bai 白鷺; Foshan, China

The 22nd Miss Chinese International Pageant, Miss Chinese International Pageant 2010 was held on November 5, 2010. Tianjin, China would host the pageant for the first time. TVB would broadcast the pageant one day later, delayed, for the first time ever. Miss Chinese International 2009 Christine Kuo of Toronto, Ontario, Canada crowned her successor, Eliza Sam of Vancouver, British Columbia, Canada at the end of the three-hour pageant, marking Vancouver's fifth win.

== Pageant information ==
The slogan to this year's pageant is "Chinese Beautiful Posture, Beautiful Shadows of Red Dust" 「中華美態 紅塵儷影」. This year marks the first time the pageant is held in the fall since 1989. The Masters of Ceremonies are Carol Cheng and Derek Li from Hong Kong, as well as Jin Liu from Tianjin. Special performers include Raymond Lam and Leo Ku.

== Results ==
Placement	Contestant	City Represented	Country Represented
Miss Chinese International 2010	Eliza Sam 岑麗香	Vancouver	Canada
1st Runner-Up	Belle Theng 陳美妤	Kuala Lumpur	Malaysia
2nd Runner-Up	Candy Chang 張慧雯	Toronto	Canada
Top 6 Finalists	Athena Zhang 張滿; Lu Bai 白鷺; Toby Chan 陳庭欣	Auckland; Foshan; Hong Kong	New Zealand; China; Hong Kong
Top 12 Semi-Finalists	Simwayn Tran 陳心慰; May Yan Wong 王美艷; Maisie Tran 陳美詩; Cynthia Zhang 張聖女; Melanie Lu 陸曼; Cindy Liu 劉捷	Amsterdam; Melbourne; Montréal; New York City; Sydney; Henan	The Netherlands; Australia; Canada; USA; Australia; China

=== Special awards ===
- Miss Friendship: Lu Bai 白鷺 (Foshan)
- Miss Home Beauty: Belle Theng 陳美妤 (Kuala Lumpur)

== Contestant list ==
No.	Contestant Name	Represented City	Represented Country	Age	Chinese Origin
1	Athena ZHANG 張滿	Auckland	New Zealand	23	Harbin
2	Simwayn TRAN 陳心慰	Amsterdam	The Netherlands	20	Chaozhou
3	Mintra SOJIPHAN 丁文冰	Bangkok	Thailand	23	Wenchang
4	Jessica LIN 林晨諭	Chicago	USA	21	Taiwan
5	Lu BAI 白鷺	Foshan	China	22	Shandong
6	Toby CHAN 陳庭欣	Hong Kong	Hong Kong	23	Shunde
7	Belle THENG 陳美妤	Kuala Lumpur	Malaysia	24	Fujian
8	Laura LI 李若瀅	Macau	Macao	22	Guangdong
9	Samantha Jade ONG DY 李璇璇	Manila	Philippines	21	Fujian
10	May Yan WONG 王美艷	Melbourne	Australia	22	Hainan
11	Maisie TRAN 陳美詩	Montréal	Canada	21	Fujian
12	Cynthia ZHANG 張聖女	New York City	USA	20	Jilin
13	Amy CHU 周玉霞	San Francisco	USA	25	Guangxi
14	Cynthia VUONG 王佩芷	Seattle	USA	23	Foshan
15	Adeline YAP 葉佳慧	Singapore	Singapore	25	Fujian
16	Melanie LU 陸曼	Sydney	Australia	23	Beijing
17	Connie CHUNG 鍾梓尤	Tahiti	French Polynesia	21	Guangdong
18	Candy CHANG 張慧雯	Toronto	Canada	20	Beijing
19	Eliza SAM 岑麗香	Vancouver	Canada	25	Guangzhou
20	Candy FANG 方蘭	Hebei	China	21	Chaoshan
21	Man Zi LI 李曼姿	Guangzhou	China	18	Shenyang
22	Cindy LIU 劉捷	Henan	China	25	Henan
23	Jasmine LIU 劉雅婷	Jiangxi	China	22	Shandong
24	Yoyo YANG 楊逸歐	Guangdong	China	23	Gansu

== Contestants that received media attention ==
- Vancouver Eliza Sam was the hot favorite for being the cutest girl out of the contestants. She won the pageant due to the four votes from Joe Ma Tak Chung, Sonija Kwok Sin Lei, Kate Tsui Chi San and Lau Yang.
- Sydney contestant Melanie Lu was 1 of only 2 girls with perfect proportions of 36"-24½"-36½", the other was Toronto contestant Candy Chang 35"-23"-35" and was publicly lauded by the Hong Kong media for her voluptuous figure and breasts.
