= Miss Chinese International Pageant 2017 =

- Date: January 15, 2017
- Presenters: Eric Tsang, Louis Yuen, Astrid Chan, Janis Chan
- Entertainment: Uriah See
- Venue: Arena of Stars, Resorts World Genting, Pahang, Malaysia
- Broadcaster: TVB, Astro Wah Lai Toi
- Entrants: 16
- Placements: 10
- Winner: Stitch Yu 余思霆; New York City
- Congeniality: Adelaide Lee 李虹臻; Johannesburg

The 28th Miss Chinese International Pageant, Miss Chinese International Pageant 2017 was held on January 15, 2017. Miss Chinese International 2016 Jennifer Coosemans of Vancouver, British Columbia, Canada crowned her successor Stitch Yu of New York City at the end of the pageant.

== Pageant information ==
The slogan to this year's pageant was "Searching for the Ultimate Level of Beauty" 「追尋極美層次」. The masters of ceremony this year were Eric Tsang, Louis Yuen, Astrid Chan, and Janis Chan. There were two judging panels this year, along with the main judging panel is the return of the Elegant Judging Panel, which consists of Hong Kong celebrities associated with organizer TVB. However, the Elegant Judging Panel do not interfere with the actual scoring of the pageant, rather provide the viewers of how the delegates fared in the minds of these celebrities on the panel. The top 3 scoring delegates from the Elegant Judging Panel for the first three rounds of competition were announced. This year, the pageant is being co-organized by Astro Wah Lai Toi television station in Malaysia and the venue has been moved to Arena of Stars, inside the Genting Highlands resort in the state of Pahang.

== Judges ==
=== Main judging panel ===
- Tan Sri Dato' Seri Michelle Yeoh, Chinese-Malaysian actress
- Simon Yam, Hong Kong film actor, and director
- Wayne Lai, Hong Kong television actor
- Niki Chow, Hong Kong actress, model, and singer
- Dato Nancy Yeoh, President, STYLO International

== Results ==
=== Placements ===
Placement	Contestant
Miss Chinese International 2017	New York City – Stitch Yu 余思霆
1st Runner-Up	Kuala Lumpur – Serene Lim 林宣妤
2nd Runner-Up	Hong Kong – Crystal Fung 馮盈盈
Top 5	Montréal – Alice Zhang 張高瑀; Sydney – Emily Yu 于欣卉
Top 10	Bangkok – Gam Wonglappanich 汪雅妮; Manila – Janne Zeng 曾琳; Foshan – Bella Li 李明子; San Francisco – Stephanie Wong 黃嘉穎; Toronto – Gloria Li 李珮儀

=== Special awards ===
Award	Contestant
Miss Friendship	Johannesburg – Adelaide Lee 李虹臻
Miss Finesse (Best Talent Performance Award)	Toronto – Gloria Li 李珮儀
Malaysian Charm Award	Kuala Lumpur – Serene Lim 林宣妤

== Contestant list ==
No.	Contestant Name	Represented City	Represented Country	Age	Height
1	Christina Liu 劉宣逸	Auckland	New Zealand	21	5' 7"
2	Gam Wonglappanich 汪雅妮	Bangkok	Thailand	24	5' 9"
3	Crystal Fung 馮盈盈	Hong Kong	Hong Kong	22	5' 5"
4	Adelaide Lee 李虹臻	Johannesburg	South Africa	22	5' 5"
5	Serene Lim 林宣妤	Kuala Lumpur	Malaysia	20	5' 7"
6	Lili Qu 曲里	Los Angeles	United States	26	5' 6"
7	Janne Zeng 曾琳	Manila	Philippines	20	5' 8"
8	Gloria Rong 戎瑀	Melbourne	Australia	21	5' 8"
9	Bella Li 李明子	Foshan	China	21	5' 8"
10	Alice Zhang 張高瑀	Montréal	Canada	21	5' 6"
11	Stitch Yu 余思霆	New York City	United States	22	5' 7"
12	Stephanie Wong 黃嘉穎	San Francisco	United States	24	5' 4"
13	Lovelle Cengiya 陳蓬僡	Singapore	Singapore	22	5' 7"
14	Emily Yu 于欣卉	Sydney	Australia	26	5' 7"
15	Gloria Li 李珮儀	Toronto	Canada	25	5' 5"
16	Maria Rincon 王思思	Vancouver	Canada	22	5' 7"
