= Monica Chan =

Hong Kong actress and spokesperson

- Chinese: 陳法蓉
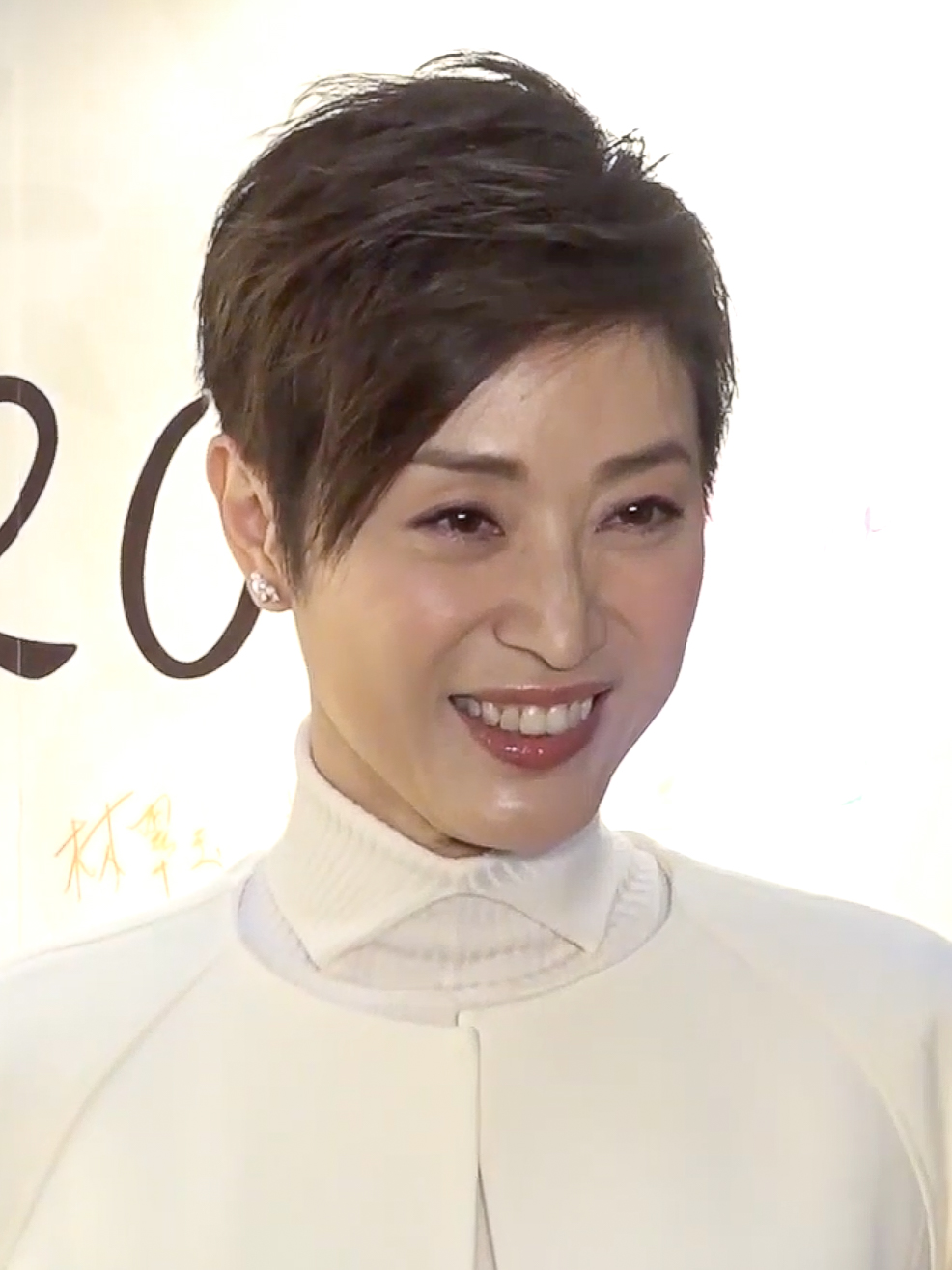
- Chan in 2018
- Born: Hong Kong
- Other names: Chan Fat-yung, Chen Farong, Chen Fa-Rong, Chan Fat-Yun, Monica Chen
- Education: University of Hawaiʻi
- Occupations: Actress; model

Chinese name
- Traditional Chinese: 陳法蓉
- Simplified Chinese: 陈法蓉
Transcriptions
Standard Mandarin
- Hanyu Pinyin: Chén Fǎróng

Monica Chan Fat-yung (Chinese: 陳法蓉) is a Hong Kong actress, model and beauty pageant titleholder. She won the Miss Hong Kong 1989 pageant.

Before her acting days, Chan graduated from high school in Canada and attended University of Hawaiʻi. Before she finished her bachelor's degree, she returned to Hong Kong to enter the Miss Hong Kong Pageant. She also gained certificate for diving instructor qualifications.

== Career ==
Monica was signed to TVB after she won the Miss HK beauty pageant. She went on to compete in the Miss Chinese International 1989 where she finished as 1st runner up. She also took part in the international beauty pageant, Miss Universe 1990 where she finished 23rd. After nearly ten years with TVB, she left TVB and joined ATV. She has worked with some popular actors and actresses like Dicky Cheung, Ruby Lin and Anthony Wong. Her last role was in 2005 in The Royal Swordsmen. In the recent years, Monica is less involved with the entertainment industry. While occasionally spotted in award shows and promoting various products as a spokesperson, she hasn't been featured in any HK dramas or movies for several years.

== Filmography ==
=== Television series ===
Year	English title	Original title	Role	Notes
1990	The Challenge of Life	人在邊緣		
1991	The Crime File	幹探群英	Grace	
1991	The Family Squad	卡拉屋		Episodes 69–71
1992	The Key Man	巨人		
1993	The Edge of Righteousness	龍兄鼠弟		
1996	ICAC Investigators 1996	廉政行動1996		
1997	Corner the Con Man	皇家反千組		
1997	Detective Investigation Files III	刑事偵緝檔案III	Pak Yan-tung	
1997	A Recipe for the Heart	美味天王	Fanny	Guest star
1997	I Can't Accept Corruption	廉政追緝令		
1999	A Smiling Ghost Story	衝上人間		
2000	Time Off	生命有TAKE2		
2000	A Dream Named Desire	美麗傳說	Rita	
2001	The Duke of Mount Deer	小寶與康熙	Long'er	
2001	The New Adventures of Chor Lau-heung	新楚留香	Feng Nanyan	
2003	Paradise	水月洞天	Yin Tianxue	
2003	Thunder Cops	暴風型警		
2005	The Royal Swordsmen	天下第一	Suxin	
2005	A Dream Named Desire II	美麗傳說2星願		
2005	Ba Zhen Tu	八陣圖	Shi Huan	
2006	Wu Dang 2	武當2		
2014	V Love	微時代之戀·初戀篇		
2017	Bet Hur	賭城群英會		
2023	Night Beauties	一舞傾城	Sha Ching-ha	

=== Film ===
Year	English title	Original title	Role	Notes
1990	Perfect Girls	靚足100分	Hua Mu Lan	
1990	God of Gamblers II	賭俠	Long Kau / Kowloon	
1991	Casino Raiders II	至尊無上II永霸天下	Kit's ex-girlfriend	
1991	The Banquet	豪門夜宴		
1992	Shogun and Little Kitchen	伙頭福星	Jacqueline Kwok	
1992	Gun n' Rose	龍騰四海	Monica Shum	
1993	The Beheaded 1000	千人斬	Chow Ying	
1993	The Tigers: The Legend of Canton	廣東五虎之鐵拳無敵孫中山	A Lam	
1994	Out on a Limb	殺之戀		Television film
1997	Full Alert	高度戒備	Yee	
1997	Those Were the Days	精裝難兄難弟	Chau	
1997	Haunted Karaoke	猛鬼卡拉OK	Md Anna Tsui	
1997	Option Zero	G4特工	Monica Leung	
1998	The Love and Sex of the Eastern Hollywood	愛在娛樂圈的日子	Queenie	
1998	Super Fans	戲迷狂情		
1999	Love and Sex in Sung Dynasty	宋朝風月		
1999	The Northern Swordsman	北俠歐陽春		
1999	The Untold Story III	四人幫之錢唔夠洗	Frances	
1999	14 Days Before Suicide	自殺前14天		
2000	I.Q. Dudettes	辣椒教室	Miss Lau	
2000	My Name is Nobody	賭聖3無名小子	Mee	
2000	Treasure Hunter	潛龍奪寶	Monica Cheung	
2000	Double Tap	鎗王	Ellen	
2000	Love Correction	緣份有Take 2	Porsche	
2000	Detective	失蹤大搜查		
2003	My Pretty Wife	我老婆未夠惡	Wei	
2004	One Nite in Mongkok	旺角黑夜	Milo's wife	
2008	The Luckiest Man	大四喜	Yung	
2011	Men Suddenly in Love	猛男滾死隊	Nana Lam	
2014	Turn Around			
2017	The Golden Monk			

Awards and achievements
Preceded by (United States) Tammy Marie Lee	1st Runner-up Miss Chinese International; 1989	Succeeded by (Hong Kong) Anita Yuen
