= Miss Chinese International Pageant 2012 =

- Date: January 15, 2012
- Presenters: Eric Tsang, Astrid Chan, Sammy Leung, MC Jin, Jason Chan
- Entertainment: Hacken Lee, Raymond Lam, Hanjin Tan, William Chan, Jonathan Wong, Mag Lam, Det Tat, Alfred Hui
- Venue: TVB City, Hong Kong
- Broadcaster: TVB
- Entrants: 28
- Placements: 10
- Winner: Kelly Cheung 張曦雯; Chicago, USA
- Congeniality: Ashton Hong 洪美珊; Toronto, Canada

The 23rd Miss Chinese International Pageant, Miss Chinese International Pageant 2012 was held on January 15, 2012. Miss Chinese International 2010, Eliza Sam from Vancouver, British Columbia, Canada crowned her successor, Kelly Cheung from Chicago, USA at the end of the pageant. Cheung represented Hong Kong, China at Miss World 2012, becoming the first Miss Chinese International titleholder to represent the region in a Miss World Pageant that is not a Miss Hong Kong Pageant titleholder.

== Pageant information ==
The slogan to this year's pageant is "The Blooming of Cosmopolitan Charm" 「綻放大都會魅力」. The pageant was supposed to be held in the fall of 2011 but was delayed until early 2012 by the organizers. Hence, several 2010 regional titleholders had already crowned their successors in 2011 and were unable to enter the pageant. However, TVB decided to let both 2010 and 2011 titleholders compete; therefore, this year marked the first time where there are multiple representatives of the same region competing together, including Auckland, Melbourne, Kuala Lumpur, Montreal, Toronto and Vancouver. The delegates representing mainland China were chosen from a regional competition Miss Chinese International Pageant Mainland China Regional Competition 2011.

Also, the organizers decided to group the delegates into three regions: Asia-Pacific, Euro-America and Greater China. While all delegates competed for the crown, first and second runners-up, Miss Friendship and Miss Cosmopolitan, there are three regional awards that were awarded to delegates from each of the three regions: "Asia-Pacific Region Glamour Award", "Euro-America Region Vitality Award" and "Greater China Region Classic Elegance Award".

== Results ==
Placement	Contestant	City Represented	Country Represented
Miss Chinese International 2012	Kelly Cheung 張曦雯	Chicago	USA
1st Runner-Up	Cheryl Wee 黃馨慧	Singapore	Singapore
2nd Runner-Up	Lenna Lim 林家冰	Kuala Lumpur	Malaysia
Top 10 Semi-finalists	Bianca Lam 林曉賢; Pireeya Wiriyapan畢利雅; Aliya Fan 范文雅; Roro Chen 陳藝蓉; Jasmine Hayter 海莉鈴; Maggie Yu 于淼; Rebecca Zhu 朱晨麗	Auckland; Bangkok; Melbourne; London; New York City; Dalian; Hong Kong	New Zealand; Thailand; Australia; United Kingdom; USA; China; Hong Kong

=== Special awards ===
Special Awards	Contestant	City/Region Represented	Country Represented
Miss Friendship	Ashton Hong 洪美珊	Toronto	Canada
Miss Cosmopolitan	Lenna Lim 林家冰	Kuala Lumpur	Malaysia
Asia-Pacific Region Glamour Award	Lenna Lim 林家冰	Kuala Lumpur	Malaysia
Euro-America Region Vitality Award	Jasmine Hayter 海莉鈴	New York City	USA
Greater China Region Classic Elegance Award	Rebecca Zhu 朱晨麗	Hong Kong	Hong Kong

=== Historical significance ===
- This marks the first time since the pageant began where no Canadian representative placed within the semi-finals. Ashton Hong from Toronto won the Miss Friendship award and is the only Canadian representative of this year to win an award.

== Contestant list ==
No.	Contestant Name	Represented City	Represented Country	Age	Region Group
1	Bianca LAM 林曉賢	Auckland	New Zealand	20	Asia-Pacific
2	Hillbe CAI 蔡健萍	Auckland	New Zealand	23	Asia-Pacific
3	Pireeya (Biliya) Wiriyapan 畢利雅	Bangkok	Thailand	24	Asia-Pacific
4	Emily YAP 葉伊秀	Kuala Lumpur	Malaysia	26	Asia-Pacific
5	Lenna LIM 林家冰	Kuala Lumpur	Malaysia	23	Asia-Pacific
6	Kady Michelle ONG WILSON 林啟莉	Manila	Philippines	22	Asia-Pacific
7	Aliya FAN 范文雅	Melbourne	Australia	26	Asia-Pacific
8	Ying Jie MA 馬穎杰	Melbourne	Australia	20	Asia-Pacific
9	Cheryl WEE 黃馨慧	Singapore	Singapore	24	Asia-Pacific
10	Amy LIU 劉夢倩	Sydney	Australia	19	Asia-Pacific
11	Kelly CHEUNG 張曦雯	Chicago	USA	21	Euro-America
12	Roro CHEN 陳藝蓉	London	United Kingdom	23	Euro-America
13	Wendy YU 余文杭	Montréal	Canada	21	Euro-America
14	Amanda CHUNG 鍾雅雯	Montréal	Canada	21	Euro-America
15	Jasmine HAYTER 海莉鈴	New York City	USA	20	Euro-America
16	Hilary TAM 譚曉榆	Toronto	Canada	24	Euro-America
17	Ashton HONG 洪美珊	Toronto	Canada	19	Euro-America
18	Susan SU 蘇慧文	Vancouver	Canada	20	Euro-America
19	Erica CHUI 徐穎堃	Vancouver	Canada	24	Euro-America
20	Angel WANG 王安琪	Anqing	China	19	Greater China
21	Lily XU 許敏	Anyang	China	21	Greater China
22	Yue Rong HUANG 黃月蓉	Beijing	China	23	Greater China
23	Una XIE 謝佳妤	Beijing	China	19	Greater China
24	Alice LI 李俐璇	Dalian	China	22	Greater China
25	Maggie YU 于淼	Dalian	China	23	Greater China
26	Rebecca ZHU 朱晨麗	Hong Kong	Hong Kong	24	Greater China
27	Nanci LI 李婷	Tianjin	China	20	Greater China
28	Xin Yan HAO 郝心言	Zhengzhou	China	23	Greater China

== Contestants that have received media attention ==
- By coincidence, the Winner and well known model Chicago representative Kelly Cheung was chosen by lottery to try on the Miss Chinese International crown and scepter at the kickoff press conference on January 6, 2012.
- Vancouver representative Erica Chui is daughter of actor Norman Chui 徐少強 and actress Shirley Yim 雪梨, and niece of award-winning actress Michelle Yim 米雪 and received media attention although she tried to hide her identity.
- Kuala Lumpur representative and second runner-up, Lenna Lim and Hong Kong representative Rebecca Zhu are compared as look-alikes to Miss Chinese International Pageant 2005 1st runner-up and award-winning actress Fala Chen 陳法拉 and received media attention due to the comparison.
