= Miss Chinese International Pageant 2009 =

- Date: January 17, 2009
- Presenters: Eric Tsang, Derek Li
- Entertainment: Bosco Wong, Bianca Wu, Carlo Ng, Ron Ng, Grace Wong, Leo Ku, Miriam Yeung, Corinna Chamberlain
- Venue: Foshan City News & Broadcast Centre, Foshan, China
- Broadcaster: TVB
- Entrants: 28
- Placements: 8
- Winner: Christine Kuo 苟芸慧; Toronto, Canada
- Congeniality: Skye Chan 陳倩揚; Hong Kong

Miss Chinese International Pageant 2009 was held on January 17, 2009, in Foshan, China. The pageant is organized and broadcast by TVB in Hong Kong. Miss Chinese International 2008 Océane Zhu of Paris, France crowned her successor, Christine Kuo of Toronto, Ontario, Canada at the end of the event.

== Pageant information ==
The slogan to this year's pageant is "Beauty • The Continuation of Wonderous Enchantment" 「妍 • 續奇妙風采」. This year holds the record for most delegates competing, besting the number from 1993 of 27 delegates. Although, 11 of the delegates this year represent mainland China excluding the special administrative regions Hong Kong and Macau. That number alone makes up more than one-third of the total contestant headcount. The Masters of Ceremonies include Eric Tsang & Derek Li. Special performing guests were Leo Ku, Miriam Yeung, Bosco Wong, Ron Ng, Corinna Chamberlain, Grace Wong, Carlo Ng, and Bianca Wu. The five judges in this competition were Susanna Kwan, Gallen Lo, Angel Lau (劉陳小寶), Kevin Cheng, and Siu-Hip Fung (馮少協).

== Results ==
Placement	Contestant	City Represented	Country Represented
Miss Chinese International 2009	Christine Kuo 苟芸慧	Toronto	Canada
1st Runner-Up	Skye Chan 陳倩揚	Hong Kong	Hong Kong
2nd Runner-Up	Cici Chen 陳娜良子	Vancouver	Canada
Top 5 Finalists	Ni Jiang 蔣妮; Julie Lam 林玉春	Seattle; Tübingen	USA; Germany
Top 8 Semifinalists	Yen Yi Lee 李彥誼; Yi Yun Dong 董藝雲; Xiao Ling Han 韓曉玲	Auckland; Beijing; Zhengzhou	New Zealand; China; China

=== Special awards ===
- Miss Friendship: Skye Chan 陳倩揚 (Hong Kong)
- Miss Young: Julie Lam 林玉春 (Tübingen)
- Oriental Charm Ambassador Award: Cici Chen 陳娜良子 (Vancouver)
- International Charm Ambassador Award: Christine Kuo 苟芸慧 (Toronto)

=== Swimsuit competition scores ===
Delegate	Scores
Toronto	43
Tübingen	42
Seattle	40
Nanjing	40
Beijing	39
Hong Kong	38
Macau	38
Auckland	37
Chongqing	37
Zhengzhou	36
New York City	36
Sydney	36
San Francisco	35
Hangzhou	34

Delegate	Scores
Jilin	34
Manila	34
Vancouver	33
Melbourne	33
Singapore	32
Heilongjiang	31
Kuala Lumpur	31
Tahiti	31
Chicago	29
Montréal	29
Wuhan	29
Guangdong	27
Foshan	26
Harbin	24

Winner
First Runner-up
Second Runner-up
Top 5 Finalist
Top 8 Semifinalist

== Contestant list ==
No.	Contestant Name	Represented City	Represented Country	Age	Chinese Origin
1	Yen Yi LEE 李彥誼	Auckland	New Zealand	25	Chaoyang
2	Yi Yun DONG 董藝雲	Beijing	China	24	Henan
3	Nancy KWONG 鄺迺狄	Chicago	USA	25	Kaiping
4	Shiney LIU 劉思彤	Chongqing	China	24	Chongqing
5	Yun YANG 楊韻	Foshan	China	20	Jiangxi
6	Indira LIU 劉家旋	Guangdong	China	20	Guangdong
7	Linda GUO 郭玉良	Hangzhou	China	25	Hebei
8	Teresa ZHANG 張燁晗	Harbin	China	25	Heilongjiang
9	Yoyo ZHAN 詹秀秀	Heilongjiang	China	19	Anhui
10	Skye CHAN 陳倩揚	Hong Kong	Hong Kong	25	Zhongshan
11	Momo LIU 劉默伊洋	Jilin	China	20	Jilin
12	Kelly THAM 譚嘉麗	Kuala Lumpur	Malaysia	22	Guangdong
13	Florence LOI 呂蓉茵	Macau	Macao	24	Guangdong
14	Beatrix CO 許明明	Manila	Philippines	21	Fujian
15	Skye CHU 朱世祺	Melbourne	Australia	20	Shanghai
16	Luciana HURTADO 詹安娜	Montréal	Canada	19	Pingtung
17	Laura YANG 楊曉蕾	Nanjing	China	24	Yunnan
18	Vicki PON 彭瑞霖	New York City	USA	19	Taiwan
19	Louisa LIU 劉陽	San Francisco	USA	21	Guangzhou
20	Ni JIANG 蔣妮	Seattle	USA	20	Sichuan
21	Valentane HUANG 黃緹湘	Singapore	Singapore	25	Guangzhou
22	Yuki WANG 王昕妍	Sydney	Australia	24	Beijing
23	Asia HAMMILL 梅花	Tahiti	French Polynesia	21	Guangdong
24	Christine KUO 苟芸慧	Toronto	Canada	25	Taiwan
25	Julie LAM 林玉春	Tübingen	Germany	21	Chaozhou
26	Cici CHEN 陳娜良子	Vancouver	Canada	23	Guangdong
27	Shirley XU 徐莉	Wuhan	China	23	Hubei
28	Xiao Ling HAN 韓曉玲	Zhengzhou	China	22	Henan

== Notes ==
=== Replacements ===
- Hong Kong – Miss Hong Kong 2008 winner Edelweiss Cheung was replaced by the 1st runner-up, Skye Chan because of her illness.

== Crossovers ==
Contestants who previously competed or will be competing at other international beauty pageants:

Miss World

- 2008: Hong Kong: Skye CHAN

Miss International

- 2008: Macau: Florence Loi

Miss Tourism Queen International

- 2009: Macau: Florence Loi
- 2009: Singapore: Valentane Huang (Top 20)
