= Miss Chinese International Pageant 1989 =

- Date: December 17, 1989
- Presenters: Carina Lau, Philip Chan, Elizabeth Lee
- Venue: TV City, Hong Kong
- Broadcaster: TVB
- Entrants: 20
- Placements: 5
- Winner: Kit Wong 黄美潔; Sydney, Australia

The second Miss Chinese International Pageant, Miss Chinese International Pageant 1989 was held on December 17, 1989, in Hong Kong. Miss Chinese International 1988 Michelle Monique Reis of Hong Kong crowned Kit Wong of Sydney, Australia as the new winner. Sydney would not go on to win the crown, until 2007, when Sarah Song captured the title.

== Pageant information ==
The theme to this year's pageant is "The Traditions of the Dragon, The Embodiment of Beauty" 「龍的傳統 俏的化身」. The Masters of Ceremonies were Carina Lau, Philip Chan, and Miss Hong Kong 1987 first runner-up Elizabeth Lee.

== Results ==
Placement	Contestant	City Represented	Country Represented
Miss Chinese International 1989	Kit Wong 黄美潔	Sydney	Australia
1st Runner-Up	Monica Chan 陳法蓉	Hong Kong	Hong Kong
2nd Runner-Up	Guilhermina Pedruco 畢美娜	Macau	Macau
Top 5 Finalists	Lisa Chow 曹夢蘭; Yu Ping Fan 范瑜娉	Vancouver; Seattle	Canada; USA

=== Special awards ===
- Miss Oriental Charm: Kit Wong 黄美潔 (Sydney)
- Brightest Smile Award: Kit Wong 黄美潔 (Sydney)

== Contestant list ==
No.	Contestant Name	Represented City	Represented Country
1	Kelly TAN 陳娟娟	Singapore	Singapore
2	Guilhermina Madeira da Silva PEDRUCO 畢美娜	Macau	Macau
3	Jackie NGAI 魏志紅	Victoria	Canada
4	Monica CHAN 陳法蓉	Hong Kong	Hong Kong
5	Desiree CHEE 朱惠芬	Brisbane	Australia
6	Bao-San LUONG 梁寶珊	Edmonton	Canada
7	Kit WONG 黃美潔	Sydney	Australia
8	Carmen KONG 江嘉敏	Tahiti	French Polynesia
9	Janet WU 吳筱捷	Melbourne	Australia
10	Lillian S. YUEN 袁雪華	Chicago	USA
11	Lisa CHOW 曹夢蘭	Vancouver	Canada
12	Lillian LEE 李麗蓮	Hastings	New Zealand
13	Mun-Den LEE 李曼晶	San Francisco	USA
14	Yu-Ping FAN 范瑜娉	Seattle	USA
15	Eleana AU 區婉玲	Calgary	Canada
16	Sally KHOO 邱明珠	Penang	Malaysia
17	Angela Jacqueline KAMSON 劉秀嫦	Johannesburg	South Africa
18	Stephanie WARRINGTON 韋詠蓮	London	England
19	Bernadette LI 李美蘭	Montréal	Canada
20	Angela Beata RECTO 杜安琪	Manila	Philippines

== Crossovers ==
Contestants who previously competed or will be competing at other international beauty pageants:

Miss World

- 1989: Macau : Guilhermina Pedruco

Miss Universe

- 1990: Hong Kong: Monica Chan
