= Miss Chinese International Pageant 2008 =

- Date: January 26, 2008
- Presenters: Eric Tsang, Sammy Leung, Myolie Wu
- Entertainment: Kenny Chung
- Venue: Foshan City News & Broadcast Centre, Foshan, China
- Broadcaster: TVB
- Entrants: 23
- Placements: 11
- Winner: Océane Zhu; Paris, France
- Congeniality: Delaine Lee 李德玲; Calgary, Canada

Miss Chinese International Pageant 2008 was held on January 26, 2008 in Foshan, China, for the second consecutive year. The pageant was organized and broadcast by TVB in Hong Kong. Miss Chinese International 2007 Sarah Song of Sydney, Australia crowned Océane Zhu of Paris, France as the 20th Miss Chinese International. Zhu is the first ever winner from Europe.

== Pageant information ==
The slogan to this year's pageant was "Expanding the View of the World: Beauty Comes from the Chinese " 「放眼世界 美麗來自中華」. The Masters of Ceremonies include Eric Tsang, Sammy Leung and Myolie Wu. Special performing guest was cantopop singer Kenny Chung. Contestant #23 TingJia Rosalinda Lorigiano of Montreal was the youngest of all competitors in the history of the pageant, at 17 years old. Her younger sister, Lucia Lorigiano 黄婷麗, later competed and won the title of Miss Chinese Montreal and competed in Miss Chinese International Pageant 2014 and won 2nd Runner-Up.

=== Top 10 mishap ===
While the MCs were announcing the top 10 semi-finalists, there was a notable pause and indistinct discussion among them after the third delegate was called out. Eric Tsang then said an error was made in announcing one of the semi-finalists, but did not state whom. After the initial 10 delegates were revealed, Sammy Leung announced that (20) Ivy Han was among the semi-finalist list as well, causing the list to grow to eleven semi-finalists. Immediately afterwards, the reasoning for this was backtracked and the MCs stated that the extra semi-finalist was due to scoring issues and a tie for 10th place. After the pageant, it was revealed that the mix-up occurred because the scoring tie was not communicated to the MCs, hence they were hesitant to announce all eleven semi-finalists.

== Results ==
Placement	Contestant	City Represented	Country Represented
Miss Chinese International 2008	06.Océane Zhu 朱璇	Paris	France
1st Runner-Up	13.Kayi Cheung 張嘉兒	Hong Kong	Hong Kong
2nd Runner-Up	04.Aileen Xu 徐萌	Chongqing	China
Top 5 Finalists	12Joanne Yew 尤鳳音; 01 Gam Sakao Huang黃美玲	Kuala Lumpur; Bangkok	Malaysia; Thailand
Top 11 Semi-Finalists	Cici Chen 陳麗; Wendy Xu 徐弋雯; Qinxin Li 李沁芯; Alexis Go 吳佳穎; Lily Ji 吉麗; TingJia Rosalinda Lorigiano 黃婷佳	Hunan; Hangzhou; Pearl River; Manila; Kunming; Montréal	China; China; China; Philippines; China; Canada

=== Special awards ===
- Miss Friendship: Delaine Lee 李德玲 (Calgary)
- Miss Courageous: Lisa Li 李莎 (Auckland)
- Miss Young: Océane Zhu 朱璇 (Paris)

== Contestant list ==
No.	Contestant Name	Represented City	Represented Country	Age	Chinese Origin
1	Sakao (Gam) UEAVIVATSAKUL 黃美玲	Bangkok	Thailand	23	Shantou
2	Karen CHONG 鍾嘉玲	Tahiti	French Polynesia	23	Guangdong
3	Alexis GO 吳佳穎	Manila	Philippines	19	Fujian
4	Aileen XU 徐萌	Chongqing	China	21	Sichuan
5	Wendy XU 徐弋雯	Hangzhou	China	20	Zhejiang
6	Oceane ZHU 朱璇	Paris	France	20	Beijing
7	Qinxin LI 李沁芯	Pearl River	China	18	Guangdong
8	Jackie SONG 宋雙佳	Shenyang	China	23	Liaoning
9	Cici CHEN 陳麗	Hunan	China	18	Hunan
10	Lily JI 吉麗	Kunming	China	19	Yunnan
11	Desiree YONG 楊詩穎	Singapore	Singapore	23	Guangzhou
12	Joanne Yew 尤鳳音	Kuala Lumpur	Malaysia	20	Nanian
13	Kayi CHEUNG 張嘉兒	Hong Kong	Hong Kong	24	Chaozhou
14	Lisa LI 李莎	Auckland	New Zealand	19	Qingdao
15	Delaine LEE 李德玲	Calgary	Canada	25	Taishan
16	Jessica CHOI 蔡凱欣	Vancouver	Canada	19	Shunde
17	Stacy WANG 王瑩	New York City	USA	18	Heilongjiang
18	Liang WANG 王靚	Toronto	Canada	18	Beijing
19	Vivian CHAN 陳穎彤	Seattle	USA	20	Guangdong
20	Ivy HAN 韓曉丹	Sydney	Australia	22	Beijing
21	Kelly MENG 孟醇	Melbourne	Australia	20	Qingdao
22	Locia LOGN龙洋	Harbin	China	19	Shandong
23	Ting Jia Rosalinda LORIGIANO 黃婷佳	Montréal	Canada	17	Shandong

== Crossovers ==
Contestants who previously competed or will be competing at other international beauty pageants:

Miss World

- 2007: Hong Kong: Kayi Cheung (Top 16)
