= Miss Chinese International Pageant 2014 =

- Date: January 26, 2014
- Presenters: Eric Tsang, Eric Moo, Luisa Maria Leitão
- Venue: TVB City, Hong Kong
- Broadcaster: TVB
- Entrants: 16
- Placements: 14
- Winner: Grace Chan 陳凱琳; Hong Kong
- Congeniality: Mandi Cheung 張佩雯; Singapore

The 25th Miss Chinese International Pageant, Miss Chinese International Pageant 2014 was held on January 26, 2014. Miss Chinese International 2013 Gloria Tang of Vancouver, British Columbia, Canada crowned her successor, Grace Chan of Hong Kong at the end of the pageant.

== Pageant information ==
The slogan to this year's pageant is "Beauty Reborn, The Fiery Phoenix" 「美麗重生 火鳳凰」. For the first time in the history of the pageant, delegates were eliminated after each round of competition, slowing narrowing the field from 16 delegates to 14, then ten, six, and finally 5 finalists to compete for the crown.

The masters of ceremony this year are Eric Tsang, Eric Moo, and Luisa Maria Leitão. Judges included singer Hacken Lee, model Kathy Chow, and Miss Hong Kong 1985 Second Runner-Up Ellen Wong.

TingLi Lucia Lorigiano, Montreal's representative and 2nd Runner-Up, is the younger sister of TingJia Rosalinda Lorigiano, who represented Montreal in the Miss Chinese International Pageant 2008. Lucia's 2nd Runner-Up win marks the first time since 2001 in which Montreal has placed in the Top Three.

== Results ==
Placement	Contestant	City Represented	Country/Region Represented
Miss Chinese International 2014	Grace Chan 陳凱琳	Hong Kong	Hong Kong
1st Runner-Up	Cindy Zhong 鍾熠	Vancouver	Canada
2nd Runner-Up	TingLi Lucia Lorigiano 黃婷麗	Montréal	Canada
Top 5 Finalists	Zhiny Ooi 黃之豫; Maggie Zhang 張雨晴	Kuala Lumpur; New York City	Malaysia; USA
Top 6 Finalists	Lydia Zhang 張雅旻	Melbourne	Australia
Top 10 Semi-finalists	Bonny Hu 胡佩玲; Tiffany Du 杜昕然; Phyllis Dai 戴婕菲; Mandy Liang 梁淼	Foshan; Seattle; Sydney; Toronto	China; USA; Australia; Canada
Top 14 Quarter-finalists	Erica He 何雨蔚; Pemy Thabkaew 林佩敏; Wendy Shu 束雯; Mandi Cheung 張佩雯	Auckland; Bangkok; Los Angeles; Singapore	New Zealand; Thailand; USA; Singapore

=== Special awards ===
Special Awards	Contestant	City/Region Represented	Country Represented
Miss Friendship	Mandi Cheung 張佩雯	Singapore	Singapore

== Judges ==
- Ellen Wong - Chairman of Board of Trustees of Wai Yin Association
- Hacken Lee - singer, actor, television presenter
- Kathy Chow - model and television presenter
- William Leung - CEO, Sun Hung Kai Financial
- Peter H Pang - Council Member, Kowloon City District Council

== Contestant list ==
No.	Contestant Name	Represented City	Represented Country	Age	Height
1	Erica HE 何雨蔚	Auckland	New Zealand	26	5' 8"
2	Peramin (Pemy) Thabkaew 林佩敏	Bangkok	Thailand	22	5' 6"
3	Jessica OU 區思敏	Chicago	USA	22	5' 3¼"
4	Bonny HU 胡佩玲	Foshan	China	20	5' 7"
5	Grace CHAN 陳凱琳	Hong Kong	Hong Kong	22	5' 4"
6	Zhiny OOI 黃之豫	Kuala Lumpur	Malaysia	24	5' 9"
7	Wendy SHU 束雯	Los Angeles	USA	26	5' 7"
8	Lydia ZHANG 張雅旻	Melbourne	Australia	23	5' 4"
9	TingLi Lucia LORIGIANO 黃婷麗	Montréal	Canada	20	5' 7½"
10	Maggie ZHANG 張雨晴	New York City	USA	21	5' 8"
11	Amanda LEE 李嘉嘉	San Francisco	USA	26	5' 3½"
12	Tiffany DU 杜昕然	Seattle	USA	21	5' 6¼"
13	Mandi CHEUNG 張佩雯	Singapore	Singapore	19	5' 6"
14	Phyllis DAI 戴婕菲	Sydney	Australia	21	5' 6"
15	Mandy LIANG 梁淼	Toronto	Canada	26	5' 7"
16	Cindy ZHONG 鍾熠	Vancouver	Canada	23	5' 7"
