= List of TVB dramas in 2014 =

This is a list of television serial dramas released by TVB in 2014.

== Top ten drama series in ratings ==
The following is a list of the highest-rated drama series released by TVB in 2014. The list includes premiere week, final week ratings, series finale ratings, as well as the average overall count of live Hong Kong viewers (in millions). The top five include overall ratings across all platforms.

Highest-rated drama series of 2014
| Rank | English title | Chinese title | Average | Peak | Premiere week | Final week | Series finale | HK viewers (millions) |
|---|---|---|---|---|---|---|---|---|
| 1 | Line Walker | 使徒行者 | 27.6 (30.5)^{[A]} | 35 | 25 | 29 | 30 | 1.79 (1.98) |
| 2 | Gilded Chopsticks | 食為奴 | 28.6 (30.3)^{[A]} | 31 | 28 | 30 | 30 | 1.86 (1.96) |
| 3 | Rear Mirror | 載得有情人 | 26.7 (28.6) | 31 | 26 | 28 | 29 | 1.73 (1.85) |
| 4 | Storm in a Cocoon | 守業者 | 27.3 (28.3) | 36 | 26 | 29 | 32 | 1.77 (1.83) |
| 5 | Come On, Cousin | 老表，你好hea！ | 26 (28) | 29 | 26 | 24 | 26 | 1.66 (1.81) |
| 6 | Outbound Love | 單戀雙城 | 26.2 | 35 | 26 | 28 | 32 | 1.70 |
| 7 | Black Heart White Soul | 忠奸人 | 26 | 31 | 25 | 29 | 29 | 1.69 |
| 8 | Ruse of Engagement | 叛逃 | 26 | 32 | 27 | 27 | 28 | 1.69 |
| 9 | Never Dance Alone | 女人俱樂部 | 25 | 31 | 26 | 25 | 27 | 1.64 |
| 10 | Queen Divas | 新抱喜相逢 | 25 | 30 | 25 | 24 | 29 | 1.62 |

Notes

- A According to Nielsen ratings, Gilded Chopstick was the year's most-watched live television programme with an average of 29 points. However, Line Walker topped Gilded Chopsticks in ratings across all platforms, averaging 30.5 points.

== Awards ==
| Category/Organization | StarHub TVB Awards 11 October 2014 | TVB Star Awards Malaysia 23 November 2014 | TVB Awards Presentation 15 December 2014 |
|---|---|---|---|
| Best Drama | Line Walker | | |
| Best Actor | Ruco Chan; Ruse of Engagement | Roger Kwok; Black Heart White Soul | |
| Best Actress | Charmaine Sheh; Line Walker | | |
| Best Supporting Actor | Him Law; The Hippocratic Crush II | Benz Hui; Line Walker | Ram Chiang; Come On, Cousin |
| Best Supporting Actress | Sharon Chan; Line Walker | | Josie Ho; Tomorrow Is Another Day |
| Most Improved Actor | —N/a | Sammy Sum; Line Walker, All That Is Bitter Is Sweet | Louis Cheung; Black Heart White Soul, Come On, Cousin |
| Most Improved Actress | Eliza Sam (as Most Improved TVB Artist); Never Dance Alone, Lady Sour | Samantha Ko; Line Walker, All That Is Bitter Is Sweet, Outbound Love | Priscilla Wong; Swipe Tap Love |
| Best Theme Song | "Really Want to Hate You" by Rosina Lam; Outbound Love | "Love is Not Easy" by Jinny Ng; Line Walker | |

== First line-up ==
These dramas air in Hong Kong from 8:00pm to 8:30pm, Monday to Friday on Jade.

| Broadcast | English title (Chinese title) | Eps. | Cast and crew | Theme song(s) | Avg. rating | Genre | Ref. |
|---|---|---|---|---|---|---|---|
| (from 2012); 14 May– 3 July 2015 | Come Home Love 愛·回家 | 804 | Tsui Yu-on (producer) Sandy Shaw, Sin Tsui-ching (scriptwriters); Lau Dan, Tsui Wing, Lai Lok-yi, Yvonne Lam, Florence Kwok, Carlo Ng, Angel Chiang, Joey Law, Queenie Chu, Samantha Ko | "擁抱愛" (Embrace Love) by Joyce Cheng | TBA | Sitcom | |

== Second line-up ==
These dramas air in Hong Kong from 8:30pm to 9:30pm, Monday to Friday on Jade.

Background shading indicates dramas not produced by TVB.

| Broadcast | English title (Chinese title) | Eps. | Cast and crew | Theme song(s) | Avg. rating | Genre | Ref. |
|---|---|---|---|---|---|---|---|
| (from 2013); 17 Dec– 17 Jan | Return of the Silver Tongue 舌劍上的公堂 | 25 | Lee Yim-fong (producer); Roger Kwok, Kristal Tin, Priscilla Wong, Evergreen Mak, Jerry Lamb, KK Cheung, Fred Cheng, Whitney Hui, Grace Wong, Rachel Kan, Yu Yeung, Yu Chi-ming, Suet Nei | "兩句" by Kristal Tin & Fred Cheng | 25.24 | Historical period legal drama | |
| 20 Jan– 14 Feb | Outbound Love 單戀雙城 | 21 | Fong Chun-chiu (producer); Chan Ching-yee (scriptwriter); Ruco Chan, Aimee Chan, Rosina Lam, Tony Hung, Matt Yeung, Elaine Yiu, Samantha Ko, Elliot Ngok, Amy Fan, Benz Hui, Ching Hor-wai, Mary Hon | "很想討厭你" (I Really Want To Hate You) by Rosina Lam | 26.32 | Romantic comedy | |
| 17 Feb- 28 Mar | Storm in a Cocoon 守業者 | 31 | Leung Choi-yuen (producer); Ng Siu-tung (scriptwriter); Steven Ma, Evergreen Mak, Tavia Yeung, Maggie Shiu, Natalie Tong, Katy Kung, Cilla Kung, Tracy Ip, Matt Yeung, Elliot Ngok | "天意"(Heaven's will) by Steven Ma | 27.47 | Drama | |
| 31 Mar- 25 Apr | Swipe Tap Love 愛我請留言 | 20 | Andy Chan Yiu-chun (producer); Raymond Wong Ho-yin, Priscilla Wong, Eddie Kwan, Tony Hung, Kelly Fu, Elaine Yiu, Vincent Wong, Rebecca Chan, Kaki Leung | "愛我請留言” (Swipe Tap Love) by Jinny Ng | 24.25 | Romance | |
| 28 Apr- 27 June | Journey to the West 西遊記 | 45 | Zhang Jizhong (producer); Wu Yue, Nie Yuan, Zang Jinsheng, Elvis Tsui | "護航"(Shelter) by Alfred Hui | 22.12 | Fantasy, Legend | |
| 30 June- 8 Aug | Ghost Dragon of Cold Mountain 寒山潛龍 | 30 | Marco Law (producer); Kenneth Ma, Rosina Lam, Selena Li, Pierre Ngo, Power Chan, Raymond Cho | “歸途” (Way Back Home) by Fred Cheng | 23.67 | Historical period drama, Mystery, Comedy | |
| 11 Aug- 5 Sep | Rear Mirror 載得有情人 | 20 | Fong Chun-chiu (producer); Wayne Lai, Louisa So, Tony Hung, Natalie Tong, Benjamin Yuen, Chung King-fai, Lau Kong, Susan Tse, Mary Hon | “高攀”(Out of My League) by Hubert Wu | 26.5 | Drama | |
| 8 Sep- 17 Oct | All That Is Bitter Is Sweet 大藥坊 | 30 | Tsui Ching-hong (producer); Linda Chung, Ruco Chan, Raymond Wong Ho-yin, Natalie Tong, Pierre Ngo, Sammy Sum, Elliot Ngok, Pat Poon, Du Yan-ge, Shirley Yeung, Samantha Ko, Susan Tse | “心藥”(Self Healing) by Teresa Cheung “大愛”(Sacrifice) by Linda Chung | 24 | Chinese medical drama | |
| 20 Oct- 30 Nov | Come On, Cousin 老表，你好hea！ | 30 | Wong Wai-sing (producer); Roger Kwok, Wong Cho-lam, Joey Meng, Ivana Wong, Louis Cheung, Chung King-fai, Tommy Wong, Mimi Chu, Bob Lam, May Chan, Bowie Wu, Law Lan | “世界仔” (Guy of Worldly) by Louis Yuen | 25.7 | Comedy | |
| 01 Dec- 26 Dec | Lady Sour 醋娘子 | 20 | Poon Ka-tak (producer); Myolie Wu, Ron Ng, Him Law, Eliza Sam, Gigi Wong, Alice Chan, Jade Leung, Koo Ming-wah, Derek Kok, Koni Lui | “是你嗎?” (When You Came Into My Life?) by Ron Ng & Myolie Wu | 23.2 | Historical period comedy | |
| (to 2015); 29 Dec; 23 Jan | Noblesse Oblige 宦海奇官 | 20 | Lee Tim-sing (producer); Kenneth Ma, Tavia Yeung, Joel Chan, Benjamin Yuen, Susan Tse, Yoyo Chen, Ram Chiang, Lau Dan, Li Shing-cheong, Cilla Kung, Lau Dan, Lily Poon | "是非" (Gossip) by Ronald Law & Grace Wong | 25.25 | Historical period drama | |

== Third line-up ==
These dramas air in Hong Kong from 9:30pm to 10:30pm, Monday to Friday on Jade.

| Broadcast | English title (Chinese title) | Eps. | Cast and crew | Theme song(s) | Avg. rating | Genre | Ref. |
|---|---|---|---|---|---|---|---|
| (from 2013); 23 Dec– 17 Jan | Coffee Cat Mama 貓屎媽媽 | 20 | Nelson Cheung (producer); Chan Kam-ling, Wong Kwok-fai (scriptwriters); Michelle Yim, Bosco Wong, Nancy Wu, Vincent Wong, Koo Ming-wah, Eliza Sam, Miki Yeung | "鬥快"(Compete in Speed) by Hubert Wu | 24.5 | Comedy | |
| 20 Jan- 9 Feb | Queen Divas 新抱喜相逢 | 14 | Kwan Wing-chung (producer); Nancy Sit, Joyce Tang, Angela Tong, Pierre Ngo, Evergreen Mak, Yu Yeung | "歡樂年年" (Joyous every year) by Cast | 25 | Comedy | |
| 10 Feb- 14 Mar | Gilded Chopsticks 食為奴 | 25 | Wong Wai-sing (producer); Wong Cho-lam, Joey Meng, Ben Wong, Nancy Wu, Stephanie Ho, Louis Cheung, Jack Wu, Matthew Ko, Power Chan, Bob Lam | "忠臣" (Loyal) by Wong Cho-lam & Stephanie Ho | 28.6 | Historical fiction, Comedy | |
| 17 Mar- 18 Apr | Ruse of Engagement 叛逃 | 25 | Amy Wong (producer); Ka Wai-nam (scriptwriter); Ruco Chan, Ron Ng, Aimee Chan, Yoyo Mung, Louise Lee, Eddie Kwan, Kenny Wong, Lai Lok-yi, Law Lok-lam, Joseph Lee, Leanne Li, Vivien Yeo | "千鈞一髮" (Close Call) by Ron Ng & Ruco Chan | 26 | Espionage thriller, Action | |
| 21 Apr- 1 Jun | Never Dance Alone 女人俱樂部 | 32 | Joe Chan, Eric Tsang (producers); Carman Lee, Rachel Lee, Gloria Yip, Flora Chan, Angie Cheong, Fennie Yuen, Elvina Kong, Lawrence Cheng, Lawrence Ng, Eliza Sam, Steven Cheung, Luk Wing-kuen, Joe Cheng, Koo Ming-wah, Rosanne Lui | "星斗群"(Constellations) by Shirley Kwan & Mag Lam | 25.28 | Drama | |
| 2 June- 11 July | The Ultimate Addiction 點金勝手 | 30 | Chong Wai-kin (producer); Bosco Wong, Kate Tsui, Nancy Wu, Sharon Chan, Ben Wong, Elena Kong, Jin Au-yeung, Toby Leung | "考驗"(Challenge) by Fred Cheng | 22.67 | Drama | |
| 14 July- 22 Aug | Black Heart White Soul 忠奸人 | 30 | Amy Wong (producer); Roger Kwok, Ron Ng, Kristal Tin, Kiki Sheung, Waise Lee, Louis Cheung, Leanne Li, Jason Chan Chi-san | "灰色命運"(Black Heart White Soul) by Ronald Law & Hoffman Cheung | 26 | Crime, Thriller | |
| 25 Aug- 3 Oct | Line Walker 使徒行者 | 31 | Jazz Boon (producer); Michael Miu, Charmaine Sheh, Raymond Lam, Sammy Sum, Sharon Chan, Elena Kong, Benz Hui, Oscar Leung, Toby Leung, Samantha Ko | "行者"(Walker) by Justin Lo, Wilfred Lau "越難越愛"(Love Is Not Easy) by Jinny Ng | 27.6 | Crime drama | |
| 6 Oct- 31 Oct | Tomorrow Is Another Day 再戰明天 | 20 | Lam Chi-wah (producer); Lawrence Ng, Kate Tsui, Vincent Wong, Josie Ho, Kenny Wong, Tracy Chu, Jacqueline Wong, Pal Sinn, Yeung Chiu-hoi, Jade Leung | "再戰明天"(Tomorrow Is Another Day) by Alfred Hui "枷鎖"(The Chain) by Alfred Hui | 23.5 | Crime drama | |
| 3 Nov- 12 Dec | Overachievers 名門暗戰 | 30 | Marco Law (producer); Wayne Lai, Raymond Wong Ho-yin, Edwin Siu, Power Chan, Raymond Cho, Nancy Wu, Maggie Shiu, Susanna Kwan, Elliot Ngok, Grace Chan, Sisley Choi, Fred Cheng, Jason Chan Chi-san | "真實謊言"(True Lies) by Susanna Kwan "投降吧"(Surrender) by Fred Cheng | 23.5 | Drama | |
| (to 2015); 16 Dec - 9 Jan | Officer Geomancer 八卦神探 | 20 | Nelson Cheung (producer); Johnson Lee, Joey Meng, Sisley Choi, Oscar Leung, Rebecca Zhu, Harriet Yeung, Law Lok-lam, Mimi Chu, Mak Ling-ling, Law Lan, Fred Cheng | "造反"(Rebel) by Fred Cheng | 24.25 | Comedy, Police procedural | |

== Weekend dramas ==
These dramas air in Hong Kong every Saturday or Sunday night from 8.00pm to 9.00pm on Jade.

| Broadcast | English title (Chinese title) | Eps. | Cast and crew | Theme song(s) | Avg. rating | Genre | Notes | Official website |
|---|---|---|---|---|---|---|---|---|
| 26 Jan– 16 Feb | A Time of Love 愛情來的時候 | 4 | Kate Tsui, James Wen, Chris Wang, Charmaine Sheh, Kenneth Ma, Linda Chung, Yeon Jung-hoon, Wong Cho-lam, Aaron Yan, Naomi Watanabe | "愛莫忘" (Unforgettable) by Joyce Cheng "休止符" (Rest Note) by Jinny Ng "鋼琴哭" (Piano cry) by Linda Chung | 21.75 | Romance | air for four consecutive weeks, starting from January 26. | |
| 5 Apr- 3 May | ICAC Investigators 2014 廉政行動2014 | 5 | Rita Chan, Lo Heung-lan (producers); Gardner Tse, Lawrence Cheng, Ruco Chan, Joyce Tang, Shirley Yeung, Alice Chan | | 17.4 | Police procedural | Co-production with RTHK and ICAC; Ninth installment of the ICAC Investigators series | |
| 20 Jul– 5 Oct | Shades of Life 我們的天空 | 12 | Franklin Wong (producer); Henry Yu, Jack Wu, Elaine Yiu, Albert Law, Zoie Tam, Angelina Lo, Ben Wong, Elliot Ngok | "我們的天空" (Shades of Life) by Hoffman Cheng, Ronald Law, Yao Bin, KT | | Drama | | |
| (to 2015); 19 Oct– 04 Jan | Tiger Cubs II 飛虎II | 10 | Lam Chi Wah (producer); Joe Ma, Linda Chung, Him Law, Mandy Wong, Oscar Leung, Timmy Hung, Benjamin Yuen, Christine Kuo, Johnson Lee, Nancy Wu, Grace Wong | "血與汗" (Blood, Sweat and Tears) by Joe Ma | | Action | airs for 2 hours every Sunday for ten weeks | |
