= May Chan =

May Chan 陳嘉佳
- Born: 29 May 1985 (age 41); Shanghai, China
- Occupation: Actress
- Years active: 2012–present

Chinese name
- Traditional Chinese: 陳嘉佳
- Simplified Chinese: 陈嘉佳
Transcriptions
Standard Mandarin
- Hanyu Pinyin: Chén Jiā Jiā
Yue: Cantonese
- Jyutping: Can4 Gaa1 Gaai1
- Musical career
- Also known as: Siu Po (小寶); Sai Sai Lup (細細粒)
- Origin: Hong Kong
- Website: Official weibo page

May Chan Ka-kai (Chinese: 陳嘉佳, born 29 May 1985) is a Hong Kong television actress currently under Television Broadcasts Limited (TVB) management. Chan also goes by her nickname Siu Po (小寶), which means "small treasure" or "precious" in Chinese. Chan has a plus-size physique and is often cast in comedic roles as a gluttonous girl or the girl trying to get a guy. She first gained recognition playing the role "Mo Siu-man (毛小曼)" in TVB's 2013 drama "Inbound Troubles 老表，你好嘢！".

== Biography ==
May Chan was born on May 29, 1985, in Shanghai, China. She is an only child. At the age of two, she and her family emigrated to Hong Kong. Chan has a teaching certificate in piano; as she was not very good academically, her mother suggested she take up an instrument when she was 11 years old. She used her skills in piano to earn a living part-time as a piano teacher during her college years. Chan has had weight issue her entire life; this was due to uncontrollable excessive eating. Exceeding over 200 pounds, she had spent a summer on a strict diet slimming down to 140 pounds, but ended up gaining the weight back.

== Career ==
Previously, Chan worked a regular office desk job in Kwun Tong, Kowloon. In 2009, she had a very minor role in the film "Short of Love 矮仔多情", During filming she became acquainted with the lead actor Wong Cho-lam and the two kept in touch. Chan spent the next few years continuing acting part-time playing minor roles in films and TVB dramas. Wong later recommended Chan to TVB producer Wong Wai Sing when casting for Inbound Troubles, which Wong was also a writer. Chan character "Little Tiny" Mo Siu-man, cute and cheerful personality in the drama was well received which lead to her first acting award nomination. She was nominated in the best supporting actress category at the 2013 TVB Awards Presentation and soon TVB offered her more acting roles.

Chan had a small role in Dayo Wong's 2013 drama Bounty Lady, though she only appeared in a few episodes starring in the role Judy Ha Ming Chu, a village chief daughter looking for a man, it was enough for her to stand out with audiences praising her comedic acting.

Chan collaborated with Wong Cho-lam again in 2014 when he took over the production of Gilded Chopsticks . She was cast in a supporting role playing Siu To, the personal maid of Nancy Wu's character Nin Yeuk-bik, the role was enough for her in gaining more exposure to TVB audiences. Also later that year Chan participated in the direct sequel to Inbound Troubles, Come On, Cousin. which Wong Cho-lam is also a writer. Chan played Viviene Chow Lai Man, a masseuse who also works as a supermarket cashier.

== Personal life ==
She is close friends with Wong Cho-lam. She is usually cast in projects he produces.

Due to her weight issue, Chan stated that into her adult years, she has never dated.

Chan has vowed to remain a virgin until she is married.

Chan's first ever kiss on the lips with a male was given to her Come On, Cousin co-star Bob Lam since the two played a couple in the drama.

== Filmography ==
=== Television dramas ===
Year	English title	Chinese title	Role	Notes
2010	My Better Half	老公萬歲	Massage parlor Staff	
2012	Divas in Distress	巴不得媽媽...	Overweight female	
2013	Inbound Troubles	老表，你好嘢！	"Little Tiny" Mo Siu-man	Nominated – TVB Anniversary Award for Best Supporting Actress
2013	The Day of Days	初五啟市錄	Housewife	
2013	Always and Ever	情逆三世緣	Overweight wife	
2013	Bounty Lady	My盛Lady	Judy Ha Ming Chu	
2013	Coffee Cat Mama	貓屎媽媽	Tong Fei Fei	
2014	Gilded Chopsticks	食為奴	Siu To	
2014	Black Heart White Soul	忠奸人	Lau Miu	
2014	Come On, Cousin	老表，你好hea	Viviene Chow Lai Man	
2016	Come With Me	性在有情	Tong Tim Tim	Premiered on myTV SUPER
2017	Destination Nowhere	迷	Cheung Fei (妃妃)	
Filming	Good Morning, Boss	波士早晨		

=== Films ===
Year	English title	Chinese title	Character
2007	Kidnap	綁架	Lau Him
2009	Short of Love	矮仔多情	Film extra
2011	MicroSex Office	潮性辦公室	Minibus passenger
2011	Hong Kong Ghost Stories	猛鬼愛情故事	Amy
2012	All's Well, Ends Well 2012	八星抱喜	Book club member
2012	Natural Born Lovers	天生愛情狂	Film extra
2012	Romancing in Thin Air	高海拔之戀II	Radio station exec
2014	From Vegas to Macau	賭城風雲	Ken's cousin
2014	Delete My Love	Delete愛人	Romantic
2014	Don't Go Breaking My Heart 2	單身男女2	Chiu Hong Hei
2015	Lucky Star 2015	吉星高照2015	
2016	From Vegas to Macau III	賭城風雲III	Ken's cousin

== Music video appearances ==
Year	Song title	Details	Video
2014	Abnormally Normal (愈來愈正常)	Singer(s): Jade Kwan (關心妍); Album: C-12	Video on YouTube

== Publications ==
Little Tiny, You Are Good (細細粒，你好嘢﹗)
- Author: May Chan 陳嘉佳 (Siu Po 小寶)
- Genre: Biography
- Published: 21 July 2013
- Publication place: Hong Kong
- Media type: Print paperback
- Pages: 160
- ISBN: 9789888157082

* 21 July 2013 : Little Tiny, You Are Good (細細粒，你好嘢) - ISBN 9789888157082 - Author: May Chan 陳嘉佳 (Siu Po 小寶) – Publisher: Open Book Net Publishing 青春文化

A self written autobiography, Chan details her life as a Hong Kong artiste, her early years and the prejudice she often faces for being plus-size. The title of the book is in reference of drama Inbound Troubles Chinese title and her character Mo Siu-man, her breakout role.

== Awards and nominations ==
Year	Award	Category	Work	Result
2013	TVB Anniversary Awards	TVB Anniversary Award for Best Supporting Actress	Inbound Troubles	Nominated
