= Don Juan DeMercado =

- Official poster
- 情人眼裏高一D
- Genre: Modern Sitcom, comedy
- Starring: Bosco Wong; Wong Cho-lam; Kitty Yuen; Kate Tsui; Christine Kuo
- Country of origin: Hong Kong
- Original language: Cantonese
- No. of episodes: 6

Production
- Running time: 45 minutes (approx.); Ep. 1 and 6; 22 minutes (approx.); Ep. 2 to 5

Original release
- Network: TVB
- Release: February 15 – February 20, 2010

Don Juan DeMercado (Traditional Chinese: 情人眼裏高一D) is a TVB Mini-New Years series. Episode 1 and 6 are 45 minutes long. The rest of the episodes are 22 minutes long.

== Synopsis ==
The story is about a plain-looking vegetable market worker Gung Yan-tung (Wong Cho-lam) who mysteriously turn into the most popular cantopop star Gan Lik-shun (Bosco Wong) after he eats chocolate.

While Gun Lik-shun is in "singer mode", he is by far the best selling celebrity in Hong Kong. The problem is that when the chocolate effect wears off, Gung Yan-tung becomes a regular person again. He soon develops a relationship with Tse On-fei (Kate Tsui), who has no idea of his real identity.

== Production note ==
The character played by Bosco Wong, Gan Lik-Shun is a spoof of Eason Chan's Chinese name "Chan Yik-seon" (陳奕迅), while Wong Cho Lam's role, Lik-Shun's original form's name, Gung Yan Tung, is a spoof of Gillian Chung's Chinese name "Zhong Yan-Tung" (鍾欣潼). The character played by Kate Tsui, Tse On-fei is a spoof of Kay Tse's Chinese name Tse On-kei (謝安琪).

== Cast ==
Cast	Role	Description
Bosco Wong	Gan Lik Shun 廑力信	Spoof of Eason Chan's name Gung Yan Tung's handsome alter-ego Celebrity; Love Yeung Sin Wah/Ging Ji Ko/Tse On Fei
Wong Cho Lam	Gung Yan Tung 恭因銅	Spoof of Gillian Chung's name A plain-looking vegetable market worker Gan Lik Seun's true form Love Yeung Sin Wah/Ging Ji Ko/Tse On Fei
Kitty Yuen (阮小儀)	Ging Ji Ko 荊止高	Spoof of Real Ting's name Gung Yan Tung/Gan Lik Seun's agent Yeung Sin Wah's alter-ego Love Gung Yan Tung/Gan Lik Shun
Christine Kuo	Yeung Sin Wah 楊仙嬅	Spoof of Miriam Yeung's name Gung Yan Tung/Gan Lik Seun's love interest Ging Ji Ko's true form Love Gung Yan Tung/Gan Lik Shun
Kate Tsui	Tse On Fei 謝安腓	Spoof of Kay Tse's name Gung Yan Tung/Gan Lik Seun's love interest Celebrity; Love Gan Lik Shun
Wilson Tsui (艾威)	Li Chung Tak, Mark 李仲德	Spoof of Mark Lui's name
Joel Chan (陳山聰)	Cheung Chai Chun 張濟春	Spoof of Louis Cheung's name

== Viewership ratings ==
	Week	Episodes	Average Points	Peaking Points	References
1	February 15–19, 2010	1 — 5	23	—	
1	February 20, 2010	6	24	—	

== See also ==
- From act to act (娛樂插班生)
