= Last to Surrender =

1998 film directed by David Mitchell

- North American release art
- Directed by: David Mitchell
- Written by: David Mitchell
- Produced by: Curtis Petersen; Rick H.Y. Sue; David Mitchell
- Starring: Roddy Piper; Ong Soo Han; Andy Yim; Angela Ying-Ying Tong; Qingfu Pan
- Cinematography: Curtis Petersen; Johnny Askwith
- Edited by: David Murray
- Music by: Norman Orenstein
- Production company: Applecreek Communications
- Distributed by: Lions Gate Films; MTI Home Video
- Release dates: May 25, 1999 (U.S.); July 20, 1999 (Canada)
- Running time: 94 minutes
- Country: Canada
- Language: English
- Budget: US$3 million

Last to Surrender is a 1998 Canadian action-adventure film written, produced and directed by David Mitchell and starring Roddy Piper, Ong Soo Han, Andy Yim and Angela Ying-Ying Tong. Piper and Han portray an American cop and his Chinese counterpart, who must reluctantly unite to track down a violent drug lord to the Golden Triangle of Asia.

== Plot ==
Seattle police officers Nick Ford and Jimmy Wilson are staking out a Chinatown restaurant where a drug deal is due to take place. A gunfight erupts, and Jimmy is killed by a ruthless Asian trafficker known as "The Tiger", described as the "Carlos of the drug world", who then leaves for Burma. Ford is begrudgingly paired with Wu Yin, a Chinese police officer who is also after the Tiger, and with whom he had a run-in during the failed arrest. Both men are sent to Rangoon, where they are greeted by Phil Carpenter, their contact at the U.S. Embassy. They search for leads in the city's criminal district, where Ford is approached by an eccentric older man named Bong Bong, who wishes to be their fixer. Bong Bong is unmasked as a spy working for the Tiger, and reveals that the latter is currently in town to meet a business partner at a hotel. But the capture is botched again after interference from the local police.

Taking Bong Bong with them, Ford and Yin charter a plane to scout the Burmese jungle for the Tiger's secret base. Upon finding it, they are detected by the kingpin's ground troops and Bong Bong turns belligerent, causing the plane to crash. Ford and Yin are the only survivors. Although tempers occasionally flare between the two, they make their way through the jungle, fending off a tiger, hunting a snake for food and attempting to navigate rapids on a makeshift raft. However, they are knocked off their watercraft, and get separated. Yin is captured by the Tiger's men and taken to his camp, but he drops his neck chain, which is picked up by a young boy. It is revealed that Carpenter was working with the drug lord all along. Meanwhile, Ford is nursed back to health by a local woman named Chat Chai.

At her village, Ford meets the young boy, who is Chat's brother, and identifies Yin's neck chain. Ford reluctantly leaves Chat, to whom he is enamored, and infiltrates the enemy base. He frees Yin, but a shootout ensues. The Tiger gets rid of Carpenter, activates a time bomb that will wipe out the camp, and reveals a group of hostages plucked from the local populace, among which is Chat Chai. He executes Chat, and escapes to an underground tunnel. Ford and Yin catch up to the Tiger, neutralize him and escape as the bomb ravages the compound. As the film ends, Ford and Yin are seen bickering about their respective law enforcements' failings, such as Rodney King's beating and the Tiananmen Square massacre.

== Cast ==
- Roddy Piper as Nick Ford, Seattle Police officer
- Ong Soo Han as Wu Yin, Chinese Special Investigative Police Commander
- Andy Yim as The Tiger
- Angela Ying-Ying Tong as Chat Chai
- Scott Gregory as Phil Carpenter, U.S. Embassy agent in Burma
- Qingfu Pan as Bong Bong
- Brian Fuller as Bill Walker, DEA agent
- Edward York as Jensen, FBI special agent
- Bonnie Anderson as Jane Prentiss, Department of State agent
- Evan John Evans as Chief of Seattle Police
- Bruno Bryniarski as Boris Brunski, charter plane pilot
- Tommy Chang as Danny Wong, Seattle triad underboss doing business with the Tiger
- Tri-Danny Lee as Wang Li, security man for the Seattle triad, and Danny's cousin
- Bill Baker as Jimmy Wilson, Seattle Police officer and Nick's partner

== Production ==
=== Development ===
The project was originally known as Yin and Yank, hence the name of the legal entity used for it, Yin Yank Productions. Canada's Applecreek Communications, the company of executive producer Andy Emilio, made the film in cooperation with their frequent partners, multinational distributor Imperial Entertainment. The other executive producer was American expatriate Gary L. Hayes, a pioneer of the Indonesian production service industry. Petersen Productions, the company of Canadian cinematographer Curtis Petersen, provided additional production services. The last producer was Rick Sue, Chinese–Canadian owner of the Hamilton-based Wu Shu Institute, a martial arts school. His mentor and fellow Chinese–Canadian Qingfu Pan was cast in a supporting role. C.J. O'Malley, who worked with Roddy Piper in pro wrestling (as Craig Malley), was the star's personal assistant on this film and others from the era, and claims to have contributed uncredited script rewrites. The film had a budget of US$3 million, part of which came from subsidies from the province of Ontario.

=== Filming ===
An Indonesian source mentions the film being worked on in August 1996. Canadian records indicate that photography took place in November and December 1996. Toronto substituted for the storyline location of Seattle. Indonesia stood in for Burma. Filming took place in the capital of Jakarta, as well as in the cities of Sukabumi and Palabuhanratu, both on the island of Java. It was one of the earlier Western productions shot in the country following a period of restrictive attitudes on the part of Suharto's New Order regime, which made its neighbor Malaysia more attractive. id:Tino Saroengallo, a frequent Hayes collaborator who went on to write a referential book on local film production, served as production manager for the Indonesian sessions. Producer Curtis Petersen also acted as cinematographer, cameraman and second unit director. Johnny Askwith is named as co-director of photography in the credits, but himself only claims credit for second unit photography. Producer Rick Sue served as the film's martial arts consultant. Pan personally choreographed his fight with Piper, although the 60-year old was doubled for the higher impact moves.

The Indonesian shoot was a troubled one. Three trucks carrying film equipment were implicated in a serious road accident. The filming of the harbor scene was interrupted by political riots. A set representing a military camp was destroyed by a flood. A plane capturing aerial footage also crashed into the jungle. The pilot's fate has been the subject of some confusion, as he has alternately been reported as deceased or just injured. The hotel where the crew stayed had been the target of terror attacks in the past, and Piper was so shaken by the nearby unrest that he faxed his will to his wife. The wrestler's kayfabe dislike of snakes extended to his real life, and a scene that had him come face to face with one required multiple takes as he kept exiting the frame. Piper also claimed to have nearly drowned during the filming of the rafting sequence in Java.

== Release ==
=== Pre-release ===
The film was screened for industry professionals at the May 1997 Cannes Film Market, where it was represented by Imperial Entertainment.

=== Release ===
In the U.S., Last to Surrender was released on VHS and DVD on May 25, 1999, by Avalanche Home Entertainment, a sublabel of Lionsgate, with whom Imperial Entertainment had a home video partnership. DVD special features included a synopsis, cast biographies, a stills gallery, production notes, an all-audience trailer and a red band trailer. In Canada, the film was released on July 20, 1999, under the Lionsgate Home Entertainment imprint. The film was first seen in some international territories, such as Hungary, where it was released about one year prior. Some sources mention another release date of January 4, 1999, although it is unknown what this refers to.

== Critical reception ==
Last to Surrender has received mostly negative reviews. In a contemporary review, Canadian media watchdog Mediafilm criticized the "cliché-ridden screenplay" and "routine direction", but commanded the "punchy, if hardly nuanced, characterization." TV Guide was not impressed either, finding the film derivative of Lethal Weapon and deeming that "never have these clichés had less resonance than they do here".

Among retrospective opinions, MovieWeb said that while it visibly harkened back to "the day of foreign pre-sales covering the budget of a movie before it was made", it remained a "late 90s gem". To the contrary, Screen Rant criticized the "tired plot" and dismissed it as "the type of flick your eyes would drift past in the action section of Blockbuster back in the day."
