= Inbound Troubles =

Hong Kong television series

- Promo poster
- 老表，你好嘢
- Genre: Comedy drama
- Created by: Hong Kong Television Broadcasts Limited
- Written by: Wong Cho-lam; Ma Yim; MoMo; Tong Kin-ping
- Starring: Roger Kwok; Wong Cho-lam; Joey Meng; Ivana Wong; Angela Tong; Tommy Wong; Helena Law; Mimi Chu; Bowie Wu; Louis Cheung; Bob Lam
- Theme music composer: Ivana Wong
- Opening theme: "大家" (Everyone) by Ivana Wong & Wong Cho-lam
- Country of origin: Hong Kong
- Original language: Cantonese
- No. of episodes: 20

Production
- Executive producer: Tommy Leung
- Producer: Wong Wai-sing
- Camera setup: Multi camera
- Running time: 45 minutes
- Production company: TVB

Original release
- Network: Jade; HD Jade
- Release: 14 January – 8 February 2013

Inbound Troubles
- screen shot
- Chinese: 老表，你好嘢！
- Literal meaning: "cousin, you are good!"
Transcriptions
Yue: Cantonese
- Yale Romanization: Lóuh bíu, néih hóu yéh
- Jyutping: Lou5 Biu2, Nei5 Hou2 Je5

Inbound Troubles (Chinese: 老表，你好嘢！; literally "cousin, you are good!"), is a Hong Kong television comedy drama serial produced by TVB and Wong Wai-sing. The serial, which touches on the growing cultural differences between Hong Kong and mainland China, premiered on Monday, 14 January 2013 on Jade and HD Jade, and ran for 20 episodes.

Filming took place in Hong Kong, Shenzhen, Dongguan, and Qingyuan from June to September 2012. The first trailer debuted at TVB's Sales Presentation 2013 event on November 8, 2012.

Inbound Troubles had the highest-rated Hong Kong serial debut in 2013. The first episode attracted over 2.12 million viewers. Praised for its "realistic portrayal" of Hong Kong's current social issues, the serial has received favourable reviews.

== Synopsis ==
Aiming to become the best tour guide in the industry, Ng Ka-yee (Roger Kwok) sets up a travel agency with his girlfriend Szema Shuk-ching (Angela Tong) but he goes bankrupt and owes a huge debt after being cheated by others. Ka-yee wishes to pass the last few months of bankruptcy peacefully and start a new chapter with Shuk-ching after marriage. However, Shuk-ching falls in love with his best friend Ching Siu-shan (Bob) and Ka-yee is devastated. During the time, Ka-yee runs into the newly immigrated social worker Yik Suet-fei (Joey Meng), his Dongguan cousin Choi Sum (Wong Cho-lam) who dreams to be a singer in Hong Kong and the old singer Monrole (Mimi Chu) who is looking for free meals everywhere. In addition, his younger sister Ng Chi-ching (Ivana Wong) also returns to Hong Kong by lying to him that she has completed her master's degree in Taiwan already. Different culture and lifestyles between Hong Kong and mainland China create family farce every day. Used to be a coward with low self-esteem for all his life, Ka-yee suddenly wakes up and discovers his ultimate dream.

== Cast and characters ==
- Roger Kwok as Ng Ka-yee (吳嘉儀):

Hong Kong tour guide. Together with his girlfriend Szema Shuk-ching, Ka-yee opened up a travel agency that strictly serves mainland Chinese tourists.

- Wong Cho-lam as Choi Sum (蔡芯):

Ka-yee's second cousin from Dongguan, China. Choi Sum leaves his home to audition for the "Super Star" singing competition in Hong Kong. After losing out in the auditions, Choi Sum considered returning to Dongguan, but decides to stay after struggling singer, Monrole, takes him as her student. He then realizes that Monrole is his mother. Wong Cho-lam also serves as the scriptwriter and casting consultant for Inbound Troubles.

- Joey Meng as Yik Suet-fei (易雪飛):

A social worker for mainland Chinese immigrants. Inbound Troubles is Meng's first TVB television drama.

- Ivana Wong as Ng Chi-ching (吳芝晴):

Ka-yee's younger sister who dropped out of law school in order to pursue a career in music. Inbound Troubles is Wong's television drama debut. She also wrote several performance numbers for the drama, including the theme song.

- Angela Tong as Szema Shuk-ching (司馬淑貞):

Ka-yee's stingy girlfriend, who also works as tour guide. At one point in the show, she is known as the "Evil Tour Guide", as she forces people into a jewellery shop, locking her tour group inside and not letting them out unless they all purchased gold. She is filmed later on the tour bus yelling at the tourists for not buying anything and making her lose face, by Choi Sum, who later uploads it by accident onto a video sharing site. This video goes viral overnight and the next day, she is bombarded by news reporters.

- Louis Cheung as Sung Wai-chiu (宋為潮):

Chi-ching's flamboyant and fashionable boyfriend. Inbound Troubles is Cheung's first television drama with TVB, after signing a filming contract with the station in early 2012.

- Tommy Wong as Choi Yat-kit (蔡一潔):

Choi Sum's rich father. Inbound Troubles is Tommy Wong's second television drama with TVB.

- Helena Law as Sophia:

Ka-yee and Chi-ching's grandmother.

- Mimi Chu as Monrole:

A struggling has-been singer who becomes Choi Sum's vocal teacher after he agrees to help her pay her rent.

- Bowie Wu as Benjamin:

Suet-fei's father.

- Bob as Ching Siu-shan (程少山):

Ka-yee's best friend and assistant.

- Corinna Chamberlain as Nip Siu-sin (聶小茜):

Chi-ching's university classmate and best friend.

- May Chan as "Little Tiny" Mo Siu-man (毛小曼):

Choi Sum's childhood friend. May Chan and Wong Cho-lam remained in contact after working together on the set of comedy film, Short of Love in 2008. It was Wong who recommended Chan to producer Wong Wai-sing, which resulted in her casting in Inbound Troubles.

- Whitney Hui stars as famous model Monica D.:

Wai-chiu's love interest.

- Mary Hon also stars as Mary:

A well-known vocal teacher in the Hong Kong music industry and Monrole's rival.

- Eliza Sam makes a guest appearance as the younger Monrole.

== Reception ==
=== Critical response ===
Inbound Troubles suffered brief media censorship in mainland China a week before its official broadcast. Trailers of the serial that aired on TVB's overseas mainland channels were replaced with local Chinese television ads instead. China's State Administration of Radio, Film, and Television never released an official statement for why the trailers were censored. Nonetheless, Inbound Troubles premiered on overseas channels and mainland Chinese video streaming websites as scheduled on 14 January.

Since its premiere on 14 January 2013 in Hong Kong, Inbound Troubles has received mixed to positive reviews. On mainland China's Douban, the serial received a rating of 7.1 out of 10 based on over 6,500 votes.

230 complaints were submitted to TVB and Hong Kong's Broadcast Authority after the first week of broadcast. With a topic that centered on the growing social rifts between mainland China and Hong Kong, some viewers found the content in Inbound Troubles offensive to both the mainland Chinese and Hong Kong citizens. Complaints varied; some viewers expressed that the content in Inbound Troubles "beautified" the mainland Chinese and had malicious portrayals of the Hong Kong tourism industry. Others noted that the serial carried a demeaning perception of the mainland Chinese.

A few passionate viewers threatened TVB to cancel the serial, claiming that ongoing broadcast of it will create a greater division between mainland China and Hong Kong. Main leads, Roger Kwok and Wong Cho-lam, were also harassed in public for negatively portraying a Hong Kong citizen and a mainland Chinese, respectively.

The general Hong Kong public and amateur netizen critics, however, gave Inbound Troubles a positive review. The serial was praised by reviewers for its fresh cast, lighthearted storytelling, and relevant script. The main leads are also critically acclaimed for their performances.

=== Ratings ===
The premiere episode was watched by over 2.12 million viewers, receiving an average rating of 31 points. It currently has the highest-rated drama debut for Hong Kong's 2013 television season. The drama reached to 2 million regular viewers, and peaked to 2.36 million viewers, in the first four episodes of its broadcast.

Throughout its broadcast life, Inbound Troubles has received an average rating of 30 points (at 1.92 million live viewers). The two-hour finale episode achieved an average of 31 points, and peaked at 34 points. The finale episode also accumulated to over 3.9 million views online.

The following is a table that includes a list of the total ratings points based on television viewership. "Viewers in millions" refers to the number of people, derived from TVB Jade ratings (including TVB HD Jade), in Hong Kong who watched the episode live. The peak number of viewers are in brackets.

| # | Timeslot (HKT) | Week | Episode(s) | Average points | Peaking points | Viewers (in millions) | AI | Rank | References |
|---|---|---|---|---|---|---|---|---|---|
| 1 | Mon – Thu, 8:30 pm | 14 – 17 January 2013 | 1 — 4 | 30 | 37 | 1.92 (2.38) | 92% | #1 | |
| 2 | Mon – Fri, 8:30 pm | 21 – 25 January 2013 | 5 — 9 | 30 | 34 | 1.92 (2.18) | TBA | #1 | |
| 3 | Mon – Fri, 8:30 pm | 28 Jan – 1 Feb 2013 | 10 — 14 | 30 | 33 | 1.92 (2.11) | TBA | #1 | |
| 4 | Mon – Fri, 8:30 pm | 4 – 8 February 2013 | 15 — 20 | 30 | 34 | 1.92 (2.18) | TBA | #1 | |

== Sequel ==
Talks of a sequel to Inbound Troubles were circulating after the first week of broadcast. Despite the controversial reception, TVB executives expressed that they were satisfied with the drama's critical success.

TVB confirmed that a sequel to Inbound Troubles was given the green light in February 2013. The sequel, which was stated to be a major motion picture, would begin production at the end of 2013. A reboot sister production, Come On, Cousin, aired in 2014.

== Awards and nominations ==
TVB Anniversary Awards 2013

- Nominated - Best Drama
- Nominated - Best Actor (Wong Cho-lam)
- Nominated - Best Actress (Ivana Wong)
- Nominated - Best Supporting Actor (Louis Cheung)
- Nominated - Best Supporting Actor (Bob Lam)
- Nominated - Best Supporting Actress (Angela Tong)
- Nominated - Best Supporting Actress (Kakai Chan)
- Nominated - My Favourite Male Character (Wong Cho-lam)
- Nominated - My Favourite Female Character (Joey Meng)
- Nominated - My Favourite Female Character (Ivana Wong)
- Nominated - Most Improved Female Artiste (Eliza Sam)
