= Queen Divas =

Hong Kong television series

- Official poster
- 新抱喜相逢
- Genre: Modern Comedy
- Created by: Hong Kong Television Broadcasts Limited
- Starring: Nancy Sit; Joyce Tang; Evergreen Mak; Angela Tong; Pierre Ngo; Yu Yeung
- Opening theme: Joyous Every Year 歡樂年年 by Entire cast
- Country of origin: Hong Kong
- Original language: Cantonese
- No. of episodes: 15

Production
- Producer: Kwan Wing-chung
- Production location: Hong Kong
- Camera setup: Multi camera
- Running time: 45 minutes
- Production company: TVB

Original release
- Network: Jade; HD Jade
- Release: 20 January – 7 February 2014

Related
- Coffee Cat Mama; Gilded Chopsticks

Queen Divas
- Traditional Chinese: 新抱喜相逢
- Simplified Chinese: 新抱喜相逢
- Literal meaning: Meet the Daughters-in-law
Transcriptions
Standard Mandarin
- Hanyu Pinyin: Xīn bào xǐ xiāng féng
Yue: Cantonese
- Jyutping: san1 bou6 hei2 soeng1 fung4

Queen Divas (Chinese: 新抱喜相逢; literally "Meet the Daughters-in-law"), is a Hong Kong modern comedy serial produced by TVB.

== Synopsis ==
Ho Siu Lan (Nancy Sit) who is raised in a scholarly family, is not only good at housekeeping but also helps keep her husband Lin Lung (Yu Yeung) business running. Both her eldest son, Lin Chi Sam (Evergreen Mak) and youngest son Lin Chi Kit (Pierre Ngo) have yet to marry but developed an "underground" relationship with two of the most popular actresses. Siu Lan accepts them into the family reluctantly. Eldest daughter-in-law, Kwok Fei Fei (Joyce Tang) is known as the "queen of tragedy" in the industry whereas youngest daughter-in-law Man Choi Ling (Angela Tong) is dubbed as the "queen of comedy". A series of stories filled with tears and laughter will unfold within this family.

== Cast ==
- Nancy Sit as Ho Siu Lan (何少蘭), Lin Lung's wife, Lin Chi kit's and Lin Chi Sam's mother.
- Joyce Tang as Kwok Fei Fei （郭菲菲）Lin Chi Sam's wife, Man Choi Ling's rival, Ho Siu Lan's and Lin Lung's daughter-in-law.
- Evergreen Mak as Lin Chi Sam （連祉森）Lin Chi Kit's brother, Ho Siu Lan's son and Kwok Fei Fei's husband.
- Angela Tong as Man Choi Ling （文彩菱）Lin Chi Kit's wife, Kwok Fei Fei's rival, Ho Siu Lan's and Lin Lung's daughter-in-law.
- Pierre Ngo as Lin Chi Kit （連祉傑）Lin Chi Sam's brother, Ho Siu Lan's son, and Ma Choi Ling's husband.
- Yu Yeung as Lin Lung （連龍）, Ho Siu Lan's husband, Lin Chi Kit's and Lin Chi Sam's father.
- Yuen Qiu as Wong Lin Hing (黃蓮卿)
- Anderson Junior as Lin Hung (連熊)
- Hebe Chan as Lin Chi Yung (連祉融)
- Rosanne Liu Juk Hoi Gwan (祝凱君)

== Viewership ratings ==
Week	Episodes	Date	Average Points	Peaking Points
1	01－05	January 20–24, 2014	25	28
2	06－08	January 27–29, 2014	24	27
3	09－13	February 3–7, 2014	24	26
3	14－15	February 9, 2014	29	30
