= Come On, Cousin =

2014 Hong Kong TV series

- Official poster
- Also known as: Inbound Troubles 2
- 老表，你好hea
- Genre: Modern, Comedy
- Created by: Hong Kong Television Broadcasts Limited
- Written by: Lung Man-hong 龍文康; Wong Cho-lam; Ma Yim 馬焱; MoMo Wu 吳沚默; Leung Ka-kit 梁嘉傑
- Starring: Roger Kwok; Wong Cho-lam; Joey Meng; Ivana Wong; Louis Cheung; Chung King-fai; Tommy Wong 黃光亮; Mimi Chu; Bob Lam 林盛斌; Bowie Wu; Ram Chiang 蔣志光; May Chan 小寶; Mary Hon; Helena Law
- Opening theme: Worldly Boy 世界仔 by Louis Yuen
- Country of origin: Hong Kong
- Original language: Cantonese
- No. of episodes: 30

Production
- Producer: Wong Wai Sing 黃偉聲
- Production location: Hong Kong
- Editors: Lung Man-hong 龍文康; Ma Yim 馬焱
- Camera setup: Multi camera
- Running time: 45 minutes
- Production company: TVB

Original release
- Network: Jade; HD Jade
- Release: 20 October – 29 November 2014

Related
- Inbound Troubles

Come On, Cousin
- Traditional Chinese: 老表，你好hea！
- Simplified Chinese: 老表，你好hea！
- Literal meaning: "Cousin, You Are So Lazy"
Transcriptions
Standard Mandarin
- Hanyu Pinyin: Lǎo Biǎo, Nǐ Hǎo hea!
Yue: Cantonese
- Yale Romanization: Lou5 Biu2, Nei5 Hou2 hea!
- Jyutping: Lou5 Biu2, Nei5 Hou2 hea!

Come On, Cousin (Traditional Chinese: 老表，你好hea！; literally "Cousin, You Are So Lazy") (Chinese: 老表，你好hea！; Jyutping: Lou5 Biu2, Nei5 Hou2 hea!) is a 2014 Hong Kong modern comedy drama produced by TVB. The drama is a TVB anniversary series and an indirect sequel to 2013 Inbound Troubles. Almost the entire cast of Inbound Troubles returns to this series playing completely different characters. The storyline has no relations to the first series. Filming of the series took place from April–July 2014. The series began airing October 20. 2014 and will be broadcast weekly from Monday to Friday at 8:30 PM.

== Synopsis ==
The series revolves around an apartment building and its residence. When lazy 2nd generation heir Yau Tin, takes over the grocery store inside the building he overhauls it and hires all the residence in the building to work there. But soon environmentalist and stock boy Lam Joi Yeh, leads a revolt against Tin when he puts up a huge poster against the building that affects the residence quality of life.

== Plot summary ==
Environmentalist Lam Joi Yeh (Roger Kwok) returns to Hong Kong after many years abroad trying to save the environment, when he receives a call from his mother that his father is about to die. At the same time spoiled 2nd generation rich heir Yau Tin (Wong Cho-lam) also returns home to Hong Kong after many years of partying around the world when he receives a call from his mother that his father is also going to die and thinking he will inherit all of his father's money. However both of their mother's had lied to them. Yeh's father is really pretending to have Alzheimer's disease while Tin's father pretended to be dying to get back at him for carelessly spending his money all these years. To prove he is not a lazy useless heir Tin agrees to manage his father's very first business which is a grocery store located inside an apartment building. Unhappy with the workers and environment he request the store be overhauled and the elderly workers be fired. In order to hire new workers at the last minute, Tin offers a salary of HKD$100 per hour. Joi Yeh goes to Tin's store to complain about the vegetables smelling like bug spray, that his mother had salvage from the store's garbage but ends up applying for a job when he sees the amazing pay of HKD$100 per hour.

== Cast ==
=== Lam family ===
- Chung King-fai 鍾景輝 as Lam Chi Wing 林志詠 (same pronunciation as Taiwanese singer/actor Jimmy Lin)

Yeh and Suet's father. Fong's husband. He works as a film extra. He does not have a good relationship with his son Yeh due to him neglecting his son when he was young so that he could concentrate being a film extra. He pretends to have Alzheimer's disease in order to trick Yeh into coming back home.

- Helena Law 羅蘭 as Fong Gwai Lan 方桂蘭 (Lan Kwai Fong reversed)

Yeh and Suet's mother. Wing's wife. She helps her husband Wing pretend that he has Alzheimer's disease and the family is poor to trick Yeh into coming back home.

- Roger Kwok 郭晉安 as Lam Joi Yeh 林在野 (he is called "Yeh Jai" which sounds the same as "bastard" in Cantonese, or the same meaning as "opposition party" in Mandarin)

Wing and Fong's son. Suet's older brother. An environmentalist who left home in his teens in order to save sharks and endangered species. He does not have a good relationship with his father due to being neglected when he was young. He also does not have a close relationship with his sister Suet because he left home when she was very young. Thinking his parents are broke, he decides to get a job as a stock boy at the supermarket inside his apartment building. When he sees his boss Yau Tin treating employees unfairly, he leads a revolt against him. When he doesn't agree on something, he likes to use the catch phrase "Not organic". He creates the website "[www.zitaulomong.com]" to voice his opinions. A former classmate of Cai Jing Man who later becomes her husband.

- Ivana Wong 王菀之 as Lam Suet 林雪 (same name as Hong Kong character actor Lam Suet, with her character development reflective of G.E.M.)

Wing and Fong's rebellious, unruly daughter. Yeh's younger sister. She desperately wants to get into show business and blackmails her father by not outing his scheme against her brother so that he will let her get into show business. She becomes Mario's girlfriend and sugar mama when he sees her flaunting her money at the supermarket. Later becomes a famous singer.

=== Yau family ===
- Bowie Wu 胡楓 as Yau Cheung 尤長 (same pronunciation as "emir" in Cantonese)
  - Wong Cho-lam 王祖藍 as young Yau Cheung 青年尤長

Tin's rich father and Barbara's husband. He owns the local television station and the building where the "Useful Market" and all the residents live at. Unhappy with how his lazy, useless son Tin is recklessly spending his money he lies about dying in order to trick him into coming home. He threatens to cut off Tin financially unless he can prove his worth by letting him run the grocery store inside a residential building. Had an affair with Sui in his younger years which produced their illegitimate daughter Man.

- Mary Hon 韓馬利 as Barbara 芭芭拉 (same spelling as Barbara)
  - Grace Wong 王君馨 as young Barbara 青年芭芭拉

Tin's mother and Cheung's wife. She likes to spoil her son and calls him "Baby". While trying to find a rich Sugar Mama, Mario seduces her when she is looking for a personal trainer at the gym. Wanting Mario as a boy-toy all to herself, she asks her son Yau Tin to open a artiste management company in order to manage Mario's personal life and promote him as a celebrity. A former dancer, she met her husband when he signed up for dance lessons. She has a younger sister that has Down syndrome. Her husband dumps her when he catches her fooling around with Mario.

- Wong Cho-lam 王祖藍 as Yau Tin 尤田 (same pronunciation as "oil well" in Cantonese)

Cheung and Barbara's spoiled, lazy, and selfish son. He lies to his father that he has been studying abroad all these years but was partying and spending recklessly. He is a playboy that likes to flirt with cute girls. When his father lies that he is dying, he goes home thinking he will inherit his father's fortune. In order to prove to his father that he is not a lazy 2nd generation heir, he agrees to manage the grocery store inside a residential building. Not happy with the stores environment and workers, he overhauls it by turning it into a gourmet market and fires all the old people that worked there. He speaks Cantonese with a foreigner's accent and likes to use the phrase "Maybe because I'm like a foreign boy" when others try to reason with him. He becomes paranoid when he mistakes Yeh to be his father's illegitimate son. He had a dream, where Shirley the shark appeared as an angel and told him what evil things he had done and why he became so evil.

=== Fujian Fried Rice Residents' Association ===
- Mimi Chu 朱咪咪 as Cai Chow Sui 齊秋水 (sounds the same as Hong Kong slang meaning to "take advantage" or "to satirize")
  - Eliza Sam 岑麗香 as young Cai Chow Sui 青年齊秋水 (introduced in Ep.18)

Man's overbearing mother. A local community politician who only seeks publicity and takes credit for doing nothing. She wants her assistant Kwok to be her son-in-law because he is obedient to her. In her younger years she was a maid at the Yau family household who had an affair with Yau Cheung.

- Joey Meng 萬綺雯 as Cai Jing Man 齊靜雯 (same name as the former Chinese stage name of Faye Wong)
  - Elkie Chong 莊錠欣 as young Cai Jing Man 齊靜雯 (introduced in Ep.3)

Sui's daughter and Kwok's ex-girlfriend. She is shy and reserved but becomes fierce and outspoken when she puts on her glasses. She likes Yeh but because of her overbearing mother she listens to everything her mother tells her to do and agrees to an engagement with Kwok. She has many food allergies. Not happy with her mother forcing her to marry Kwok who she does not love, she runs away to live with the "So Comfortable No Friends Spa" girls. She is also Cheung's illegitimate daughter.

- Bob Lam 林盛斌 as Kwok Bo 郭寶 (same pronunciation as "national treasure")

Sui's assistant and advisor. Man's ex-boyfriend. He and Man has been dating for many years but have never held her hand or kissed her. Sui pushes him to propose to Man because she knows her daughter likes Yeh. He dresses and physically resembles a communist dictator. He works as a voice actor on the side. He is torn between his duties as Man longtime boyfriend and being with his true love Viviene.

- Yu Chi Ming 余子明 as Biu Suk Gung 表叔公
- Chan Dik Hak 陳狄克 as Yi Bak Fu 二伯父
- Lee Hoi San 李海生 as Sam Kau Gung 三舅公
- Chan Wing Chun 陳榮峻 as Sei Yi Coeng 四姨丈

=== Ma family ===
- Tommy Wong 黃光亮 as Ma Lai Gou 馬拉高 (sounds the same as a Hong Kong dim sum dessert)
  - Louis Cheung 張繼聰 as young Ma Lai Gou 青年馬拉高

Mario's father and head of the prayer group that Siu is in. He and Mario do not get along because Mario does not agree with his way of living. People often mistakes him to be Tin's father because of their similar facial appearance. It is later uncovered that he was a former triad gangster in his youth with the nickname "Crazy Horse".

- Jinny Ng 吳若希 as Ma Lai Gou's wife 馬拉高妻子

Gou's late wife and Mario's mother. She found out she was pregnant while Gou is in prison. She died during a traffic accident when she was hit by a van while crossing the street.

- Louis Cheung 張繼聰 as Mario Ma Lei Ah 馬利亞

Gou's son and Siu's godson. Originally named Maria. Unhappy with his father Gou, he changed his name and lives a different life style than his father. He works as a stock boy at the market but is really a male gold digger wanna-be. He likes to show off his muscular body. He hooks Suet as a Sugar Mama when he sees her flaunting her money at the market. Later when he meets Barbara he dumps Suet and becomes her personal trainer so that she can become his new Sugar Mama. With Barbara's help, he becomes a celebrity.

- Jimmy Au 歐瑞偉 as Siu Lung Pao 邵龍豹 (sounds the same as the mini soup dumplings xiaolongbao)

Mario's godfather and one of Gou's prayer followers. He works in the meat department at the supermarket as a butcher. He likes to pray.

=== So Comfortable No Friends Spa ===
- May Chan 小寶 as Viviene Chow Lai Man 周麗敏 (similar name as 1990s Hong Kong idol Vivian Chow)

A masseuse at the spa. She also works as a cashier at the market since business is bad at the spa. Her spa customers are afraid when she offers an step on their back massage. Through her side job as a voice actor, she develops an attraction for Kwok. She and Kwok Bo later have a secret affair when he is unable to break off his longtime relationship with Man.

- Ruth Tsang 路芙 as Peter Lai Bei Dak 黎彼得 (same name as Hong Kong character actor Peter Lai)

An acupuncturist at the spa. She is often mistaken as a man since she dresses and speaks like a man. She becomes a security guard at the market since business is bad at the spa.

- MoMo 吳沚默 as Wu Gai 烏笄 (same pronunciation as "silkie")

She is in charge of brewing soups at the spa. She has unflattering looks. She works at the market in the soup department because business is bad at the spa.

=== Useful Store employees ===
- Kaki Leung 梁嘉琪 as Snoopy Siu Bo Go 邵寶高 (sounds similar to "small report")

Tin's personal assistant and secretary. She helps Tin come up with all his devious plans.

- Corinna Chamberlain 陳明恩 as Mo Dik 毛狄 (same pronunciation as "invincible")

Tin's personal bodyguard. She helps Tin carry out all his devious plans. She is also very skilled at Chinese culture, especially Kung Fu and classical Chinese language.

- Dickson Li 李家聲 as Ha Song Guk 夏桑菊 (same pronunciation as Xiasangju)
- Vincent Cheung 張漢斌 as Ha Fu Cou 夏枯草 (same pronunciation as "Prunella vulgaris")
- Elaine Tsang 曾建怡 as Ng May 吳美 (sounds similar to "not beautiful" in Cantonese)
- Deborah Poon 潘冠霖 as Lee Ngoi 李愛 (sounds similar to "you love" in Cantonese)

=== Kam family ===
- Kitty Yuen 阮小儀 as Kam Kwong 金礦 (same pronunciation as "gold mine")

A petite, rich and annoying socialite who sponsors Tin's artiste management company "Chan Sang Chai (Biological Son) Entertainment Company" so that he can promote her younger sister to become a celebrity. She likes to dress in gold colored sparkly or glittery clothing.

- Leanne Li 李亞男 as Kam Ping Mui 金萍梅 (same pronunciation as the erotic classic Jin Ping Mei)

Kwong's tall, beautiful and annoying younger sister. She speaks with a non-fluent Cantonese accent. Her dream is to be a famous celebrity even though she does not have any real talent.

=== No Background Music (NBM) ===
- Ram Chiang 蔣志光 as Ko Yam 高音 (Nickname: Tsui Ko Yam 醉高音, same pronunciation as "High pitch", entire name meaning "Highest pitch")

A drunk who lives on the very top floor of the building. He works as a musician at the local funeral home. He used to be a singer and has a great singing voice. Suet wants to recruit him as her duet partner for a singing contest. Original founder of "No Background Music" record company. He later becomes Suet's manager.

- Steve Lee 李家鼎 as Master Ding 周鼎爺 (also known as Ting Ting 鼎鼎)

Triad boss who recently brought a music company call "No Background Music" record company. Gou refers Suet to his music company for an audition. Even as the head of a record company he and his followers continue their side jobs as loan sharks.

- Ariff Chan 陳永業 as Ekin 伊健 (same name as Hong Kong singer/actor Ekin Cheng, who is known for his long hair)

A triad follower of Master Ding. He enters into a singing contest as Suet's duet partner but is a terrible singer who thinks he's great and that everyone is jealous of how amazing he is.

- Eddie Ho 何偉業 as Ah Wong 阿旺
- Adam Ip 葉暐 as Ah Choi 阿財

=== Elite Party ===
- Akina Hong Wah 康華 as Hei Lai Mei 希拉美 (similar name as Hillary Clinton; introduced in Ep.20)

The founder of Grouping Party 聯群傑黨. She is also a high school classmate of Lam Joi Yeh and Cai Jing Man. She is mentally unstable and has had a fatal attraction for Joi Yeh since high school. She will do anything to ruin Joi Yeh's relationship with Jing Man, since Joi Yeh never even noticed her feelings or reciprocated them in high school.

- Derek Wong 黃建東 as Yung Choi 容材 (same name as useless man)
- Anthony Ho 何遠東 as Fai Cai 費柴 (same name as useless man/backup wood)

=== "Not Famous, Nor Unknown (半紅不黑)" band ===
A homeless music band with talent that Mario discovers and tries to get them a record deal.

- Kelvin Chan 陳建文 as Lam Fai Zi 藍癈紙 (sounds similar to "blue scrape paper" in Cantonese)
- Milkson Fong 方紹聰 as Luk Din Che 陸電池 (sounds similar to "green battery" in Cantonese)
- Ryan Lau 陳康健 as Wong Lui Guan 黄鋁罐 (sounds similar to "yellow can" in Cantonese)
- Bob Cheung 張彦博 as Fai Gau Jun 飛膠樽 (sounds similar to "flying plastic bottle" in Cantonese)

=== Others ===
- Lee Lai Ha 黑妹(李麗霞) as Garbage lady Hing 垃圾卿 (sounds similar to "rubbish hydrogen" in Cantonese)

The garbage lady of the building where the "Useful Store" is at and where the residents live. She is also a frequent customer of the "Useful Store" market and likes to flirt with Mario.

- Chun Wong 秦煌 as Chow Gung 周公 (sounds similar to "Duke of Zhou" in Cantonese)

Viviene's father who likes to stay over at the "So Comfortable No Friends Spa". He does not approve of his daughter and Kwok Bo's relationship.

- Rita Carpio 韋綺姍 as Chan Yee Shan 陳綺姍

Ko Yum's deceased wife who is also the inspiration for him to sing again.

- Law Lok Lam 羅樂林 as Chan Yee Shan's father 陳綺姍爸爸

Ko Yum's father-in-law who blames him for his daughter's death.

- Brian Burrell 布偉傑 as Professor Robort

A university professor and hospital doctor that Yau Tin pretended to be a student of. Also the doctor that treated Yau Tin when he was in the hospital pretending to be seriously injured. Also the surgeon who was to perform Yau Tin and Yau Cheung's kidney transplant. Also a DNA specialist who uncovers that Yau Tin is not Yau Cheung's biological son.

- Tam Bing Man 譚炳文 as Leung Bing 梁炳 (former derogatory nickname of Edmond Leung)

An elderly man Yau Tin offended on the basketball court while flirting with a girl. He is the head of a triad gang. Ma Lai Gou saves him during a asthma attack, to show his appreciation he helps him open a prayer group location.

- Lam Ying Fai 林映輝 as On Jia 安仔 (Little On, nickname of Andy Hui)

A reporter and talk show host that covers the stories regarding the residence of the building and the "Useful Store".

- Gordon Siu 蕭徽勇 as Sheh Jia Ming 蛇仔明 (Snake boy ming)

A racketeer who goes to the Useful market to collect protection fees. He is also a follower of Ma Lai Gou's prayer group.

- Chiu Shek Man 招石文 as Funeral home owner 殯儀館老闆

Ko Yam's boss and owner of the local funeral home.

- Jazz Lam 林子善 as Bao Jun 爆樽 (same pronunciation as "burst bottle")

A triad gangster with an ugly girlfriend. Mario tries to hook his ugly girlfriend as a potential Sugar Mama but ends up offending her looks. Later becomes a triad leader when his boss dies from choking on chicken bones.

- Ah Mung (Dream) 阿夢 as Ah Mung 阿夢

Originally a contestant in Yau Tin's DTV fake talent pageant. Later she becomes a potential sugar mama to Mario until he offends her looks. She is also small-time triad leader Bao Jun's girlfriend whom everyone calls a porkchop (Hong Kong slang for "ugly girl").

- William Chak 翟威廉 as To Man Jun 都敏俊 (same name as Do Min-joon

A young, rich and educated man whom Chow Gung wants to set up with his daughter Vivian on a matchmaking date.

=== Cameos ===
- Kenneth Ma 馬國明 as Best Actor Ma Ming 視帝馬明

A famous actor who works with Lam Chi Wing.

- Helen Tam 譚玉瑛 as herself

Children's show host who helps Joi Yeh and Chi Wing with their father/son relationship.

- Charles Szeto 司徒瑞祈 as Children's show host 主持
- LuLu Kai 蓋世寶 as children's show host 主持
- Johnson Lee 李思捷 as himself

Host of Office of Practical Jokes 玩嘢王主持人. Yau Tin uses his candid show to end the mess with the revolting market staff.

- Liza Wang 汪明荃 as herself (introduced in Ep.30)

An actress whose name Jing Man uses to refer to an orange, her most feared fruit. She appears in a video to help Joi Yeh and Jing Man patch up their marriage.

- Kay Tse 謝安琪 as herself (introduced in Ep.27)

Favorite idol of homeless band "Not Famous, Nor Unknown (半紅不黑)" and Mario. Mario thinks her husband is useless. (Louis Cheung, who plays Mario, is her real life husband.)

- Fred Cheng 鄭俊弘 as himself

Ko Yam's singing pupil who helps his mentor uncover his wife's last words to her husband.

- Eric Kwok 郭偉亮 as himself

Judge at singing competition similar to The Voice (超級巨聲).

- Grace Ip 葉佩雯 as herself

Judge at singing competition similar to The Voice.

- Hanjin Tan 陳奐仁 as himself

Judge at singing competition similar to The Voice.

- Billy Cheung 張炳強 as Man Bo 孟波

Voice dubbing supervisor

- Lily Leung 梁舜燕
- Yeung Wai Lun 楊偉倫 as Bei Lei 比利

A obsessive deranged fan of Lam Suet with a personality disorder.

- Angelina Lo 盧宛茵 as Lo How Yum 盧巧音 (same name as Hong Kong singer/actress Candy Lo)

Yau Tin's primary school principal who lectures him about changing his behavior which he misinterprets as changing his father's will.

- Yao Bin 姚兵 as Ximen Qing 西門慶 (same name as the male adulterer in the erotic classic novel Jin Ping Mei)

A artiste signed to DTV who acts alongside Kam Ping Mui.

- Babe Tree 鄧鎧汶 as Marian (introduced in Ep.30)

Yau Tin's childhood nanny whose words highly influence who he became as an adult.

== Viewership Ratings ==
| Week | Episodes | Date | Average Points | Peaking Points |
| 1 | 01－05 | Oct 20–24, 2014 | 26 | 29 |
| 2 | 06－09 | Oct 27–30, 2014 | 25 | 27 |
| 3 | 10－14 | Nov 3–7, 2014 | 27 | 29 |
| 4 | 15－19 | Nov 10–14, 2014 | 26 | 28 |
| 5 | 20－23 | Nov 17–21, 2014 | 26 | 28 |
| 6 | 24－28 | Nov 24–28, 2014 | 24 | 27 |
| 7 | 29－30 | Nov 30, 2014 | 26 | 28 |

== Awards and nominations ==
TVB Anniversary Awards 2014

Best Supporting Actor (Ram Chiang)
