= Leanne Li =

Chinese-born Canadian actress and television host (born 1984)

- 李亞男
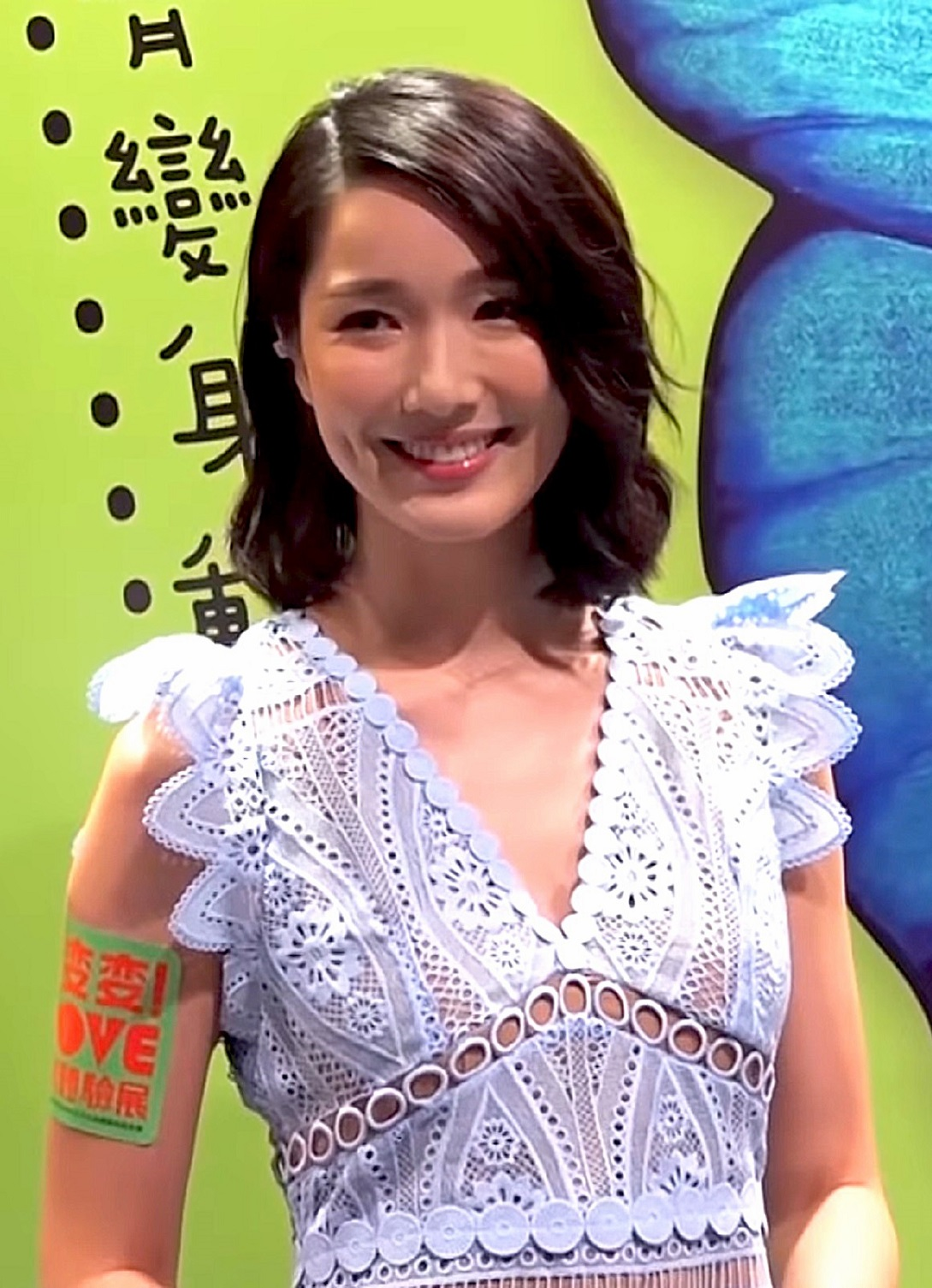
- Li in 2019
- Born: Li Yanan; 25 November 1984 (age 41); Shanghai, China
- Citizenship: Canadian
- Education: University of British Columbia
- Occupations: Actress; host
- Agents: TVB (2005–2017); Tailor Made Production Limited (2016–present)
- Height: 1.76 m (5 ft 9 in)
- Spouse: Wong Cho-lam (m. 2015)
- Children: Gabrielle Wong (daughter); Hayley Wong (daughter)
- Parents: Li Qunli (father); Zhu Rucui (mother)

Chinese name
- Traditional Chinese: 李亞男
- Simplified Chinese: 李亚男
Transcriptions
Standard Mandarin
- Hanyu Pinyin: Lǐ Yànán
Yue: Cantonese
- Jyutping: lei^{5} aa^{3} naam^{4}

Leanne Li Yanan (Chinese: 李亞男; born 25 November 1984) is a Chinese-born Canadian actress and television host. She was the 2005 Miss Chinese International Pageant winner hailing from Vancouver, British Columbia.

== Early life ==
Li's family originates from Shanghai, China who later emigrated when she was a child. The eldest of two girls, she was a second year fine arts student at the University of British Columbia before participating in the pageants.

== Pageant career ==
At the age of 20, Li competed as contestant #10 in Miss Chinese Vancouver 2004 pageant, taking the crown. She also took the titles of "Miss Photogenic" and "Best Posture". As the winner of this pageant, she represented the city of Vancouver at Miss Chinese International in the following year.

In January 2005, she arrived in Hong Kong to compete for the Miss Chinese International 2005 crown, and won. Being considered just a favorite, she beat out bigger favorite, Fala Chen of New York for the title. Her performance received positive reviews, especially during the final interview portion.

== Personal life ==
Li is a Protestant. During the 48th TVB anniversary celebration, Wong Cho-lam proposed to her. Li and Wong married on Valentine's Day in 2015. Li and her husband Wong Cho-lam are both devoted Christians who have both publicly declared sexual abstinence before marriage. She gave birth to her daughter Gabrielle Wong on 17 December 2018. In December 2020, Li welcomed the birth of her second daughter Hayley.

== TV dramas ==
- La Femme Desperado (2006) - Guest Appearance
- Love Guaranteed (2006)
- Dicey Business (2006)
- Drive of Life (2007)
- The Building Blocks of Life (2007)
- War of In-Laws II (2008) - Guest Appearance
- Forensic Heroes 2 (2008)
- The Money-Maker Recipe (2008)
- Burning Flame III (2009)
- The Stew of Life (2009)
- Suspects in Love (2010) - Guest Appearance
- The Mysteries of Love (2010) - Guest Appearance
- Only You (2011)
- The Other Truth (2011) - Guest Appearance
- Men with No Shadows (2011) - Guest Appearance
- No Good Either Way (2012)
- A Great Way to Care II (2013)
- Brother's Keeper (2013)
- Ruse of Engagement (2014)
- Black Heart White Soul (2014)
- Shades of Life (2014)
- Come On, Cousin (2014)
- With or Without You (2015)
- Fashion War (2016)

== Film ==
- Blackhat (2015) as Emergency Worker

| Preceded by Linda Chung 鍾嘉欣 | Miss Chinese Vancouver; 2004 | Succeeded by Crystal Li 李培禎 |
| Preceded by Linda Chung 鍾嘉欣 | Miss Chinese International; 2005 | Succeeded by Ina Lu 呂怡慧 |
