= Gilded Chopsticks =

Hong Kong television series

- Official poster
- 食為奴
- Genre: Historical fiction
- Created by: Hong Kong Television Broadcasts Limited
- Written by: Yeung Song Bo 楊松柏; Ho Sai-kit 何世傑; Wong Cheng-man 黃靜雯
- Starring: Wong Cho-lam 王祖藍; Ben Wong 黃智賢; Joey Meng 萬綺雯; Nancy Wu 胡定欣; Louis Cheung 張繼聰
- Opening theme: Loyal Subject 忠臣 by Wong Cho-lam 王祖藍 & Stephanie Ho 何雁詩
- Ending theme: Tears of Departure 離人淚 by Louis Cheung 張繼聰
- Country of origin: Hong Kong
- Original language: Cantonese
- No. of episodes: 25

Production
- Executive producer: Wong Wai-sing 黃偉聲
- Production locations: Hong Kong, Zhejiang Province China
- Camera setup: Multi camera
- Running time: 45 minutes
- Production company: TVB

Original release
- Network: Jade, HD Jade
- Release: 10 February – 14 March 2014

Food for the Slaves
- Traditional Chinese: 食為奴
- Simplified Chinese: 食为奴
- Literal meaning: Eat to be Enslaved
Transcriptions
Standard Mandarin
- Hanyu Pinyin: shí wèi nú
Yue: Cantonese
- Yale Romanization: sihk waih nòuh
- Jyutping: sik6 wai6 nou4

Gilded Chopsticks (Chinese: 食為奴; Jyutping: sik6 wai6 nou4; Cantonese Yale: sihk waih nòuh; literally "Eat to be Enslaved") is a 2014 Hong Kong historical fiction television serial produced by TVB. Set during the reign of the Yongzheng Emperor in the Manchu-led Qing dynasty, the serial follows the adventures of a lazy but gifted "golden-tongued" imperial chef Ko Tin-po (Wong Cho-lam), whose clumsy activities lead him to befriend the Yongzheng Emperor (Ben Wong) during an imperial struggle for the Qing throne. The story is inspired by Jin Yong's wuxia novel The Deer and the Cauldron.

Helmed by executive producer Wong Wai-sing, 25 episodes of the serial were produced. Production began in Hong Kong in March 2013. The serial was also shot on locations at Hengdian World Studios.

== Synopsis ==
Ko Tin-po (Wong Cho Lam) has tasted many delicacies since he was young. He can easily distinguish between good and bad dishes. Unfortunately, his family’s financial woes have left him and his servant Lee Wai (Jack Wu) homeless. They resort to selling buns for a living. Consequently, they meet a street performer named Kei Mo-suet (Joey Meng), the city’s most beautiful lady, Nin Yeuk-bik (Nancy Wu), and young chef Mai Siu-yu (Stephanie Ho). By chance, Tin-po also comes across the Yinzhen, the Fourth Prince, played by Ben Wong), whom he instantly gets along with.

Tin-po is invited to be a chef in the palace, where he encounters his greatest rival, Choi Hok-ting (Bob Lam). He is unexpectedly brought into the royal succession battle started by Yinsi, the Eighth Prince (Louis Cheung). Tin-po turns out to be Yinzhen's lucky star, helping Yinzhen defeat Yinsi time and time again. However, an accidental marriage contract quickly changes his circumstances...

== Cast ==
Note: Some character names are in Cantonese romanisation.

=== Main characters ===
- Wong Cho-lam 王祖藍 as Ko Tin-po (高天寶) — Male age 26

Originally from a rich family but due to the government seizing all of his father's assets he has to resort to selling "salted fish" buns in his small rented restaurant. The Fourth Prince Yinzhen sorts him out because the Kangxi Emperor has a craving for his "salted fish" buns. He is later personally invited to be a chef in the Forbidden City by the Kangxi Emperor. Yinzhen is his ally, friend, and protector at the palace when he is bullied by the head imperial chef Choi Hok-ting.

- Ben Wong 黃智賢 as Yinzhen, the Fourth Prince (四皇爺胤禛) — Male age 32

Officially Prince Yong (雍親王), the Kangxi Emperor's fourth son. Yinzhen later succeeds his father and becomes the Yongzheng Emperor, but his right to the throne is tested. He's a kind-hearted person who treats everyone fairly. He befriends Ko Tin-po when the Kangxi Emperor loses his appetite and seeks out food outside of the palace. He invites Tin-po to cook his "salted fish" buns at the imperial kitchen, who initially thought he was an imperial servant in the beginning. He has no means of wanting to succeed the emperor but is pitted against his eighth brother Yinsi when the crown prince position becomes available,

- Joey Meng 萬綺雯 as Kei Mo-suet (紀慕雪) — Female age 26

Ko Tin-po's friend. She performs martial arts in the streets with her mother to make a living. She also works at the Chinese medicine shop run by Wu Si-to. Yin-zhen has a crush on her but she likes the Eighth Prince, Yinsi. She hates Manchu people because she thinks they treat the Han Chinese unfairly.

- Nancy Wu 胡定欣 as Nin Yeuk-bik (年若碧) — Female age 24

Ko Tin-po's love interest. Tin-po falls in love with her at first sight when she offered him a bun thinking he was a homeless person. She has a strong interest in food; originally interested in Mai Siu-yu when she thought she was a boy because only Siu-yu could name all the soups in a food contest she held. Coerced by her older brother Yeuk-bik to become a concubine of Yinzhen. Suffered dementia after a miscarriage; recovered after doll therapy and Tin po's intervention using food as therapy.

- Stephanie Ho 何雁詩 as Mai Siu-yu (米小魚) — Female age 20

Runs a noodle shop next to Tin-po's shop. Originally hated Tin-po because his "salted fish" buns would stink up the entire street and cost her to lose customers at her shop. Disguised as a man to protect herself. Tin-po befriends her because of her amazing knife skills and asks her to be his sifu. Tin-po brings her along to the imperial palace when he becomes an imperial chef. Despite the apparent mentor-mentee relationship, the two would eventually begin a romantic relationship.

- Louis Cheung 張繼聰 as Yunsi, the Eighth Prince (八皇爺胤禩) — Male

Officially Prince Lian (廉親王), the younger half-brother of Yinzhen. Before Yinzhen's coronation as the Yongzheng Emperor, Yinsi was a serious contender for the throne. He and Yinzhen become heated rivals when the crown prince position is up for grabs. All of his and Yinzhen's imperial brothers except the former crown prince Yinreng are on his side.

=== Supporting characters ===
==== Imperial household ====
- Elliot Ngok 岳華 as the Kangxi Emperor (康熙帝) — Male

Emperor of China. Yinzhen and Yinsi's father. He is a good and fair emperor who wishes to treat the Manchus and Han equally and fairly during his rule. He is disappointed in all of his sons since they fight among each other for his favor and want to succeed him as the next emperor. He personally invites Tin-po to be an imperial chef at the palace when he admires his cooking skills.

- Rosanne Lui 呂珊 as Consort Tak (德妃) — Female

Empress of China, Yinzhen and Yinti's birth mother.

- Power Chan 陳國邦 as Yinreng, the Crown Prince (太子胤礽) — Male

The Kangxi Emperor's second son and Yinzhen's older half-brother. Originally the crown prince but fell out of favor when he and other high ranking government officials robbed an imperial gold delivery. Yinzhen is the only brother he trusts as he is aware that all of the other brothers are jealous of him and want the crown prince position for themselves.

- Derek Wong 黃建東 as Yintang, the Ninth Imperial Prince (九皇爺胤禟) - Male

Yinzhen's younger half-brother. He is impulsive and vindictive. He hates Yinzhen because he thinks Yinzhen told their father about him borrowing imperial government money, when it was really Yinreng who told their father.

- Matthew Ko 高鈞賢 as Yin'e, the Tenth Imperial Prince (十皇爺胤誐) — Male

Yinzhen's younger half-brother and one of the most vocal supporters of Yinsi.

- Owen Cheung 張振朗 as Yinti, the 14th Prince (十四皇爺胤禵) — Male

Yinzhen's youngest brother. An imperial military general for the government. He is part of Yinsi's imperial prince clique but tends to defend and warn his brother Yinzhen when the other princes have plans against Yinzhen.

- Ricky Wong 王俊棠 as Sok Ngak-to (索額圖) - Male

Yinreng's maternal granduncle. Imperial minister. The Kangxi Emperor sends Yinzhen to dispose of him for starting a rebellion against the government.

==== Imperial kitchen staff ====
- Jack Wu 胡諾言 as Lei Wai (李衛) — Male age 26

Tin-po's loyal friend and servant. Helps Tin-po run his restaurant. Later goes to the palace with Tin-po when Tin-po becomes an imperial chef.

- Bob Lam 林盛斌 as Choi Hok-ting (蔡鶴庭) — Male age 30

Head imperial chef at the palace. Sent by the crown prince Yinreng to obtain the recipe for Tin-po's "salted fish" buns. Pretended to be a wood twig delivery man in order to gain access inside Tin-po's restaurant kitchen. Uses dirty tactics to cause the closure of Tin-po's restaurant because Tin-po refuses to tell or teach him his "salted fish" bun recipe. Later he and his chef gives Tin-po a hard time when Tin-po becomes an imperial chef.

- Vincent Cheung 張漢斌 as Tsang Shing (曾勝) - Male

Choi Hok-ting's assistant and trusted subordinate.

- Chun Wong 秦煌 as The Great Chef (米桂) - Male

Works as an assistant imperial chef at the palace. Revealed to be Mai Siu-yu's father.

- Eddie Ho 何偉業 as Siu Fuk-chi (小福子) - Male

Low ranking imperial cook and eunuch. Yinzhen orders him to be part of Tin-po's group.

- Jacky Cheng 鄭家俊 as Siu Luk-chi (小祿子) - Male

Low ranking imperial cook and eunuch. Yinzhen orders him to be part of Tin-po's group.

==== Imperial government staff ====
- Dickson Lee 李家聲 as Fung Ying (馮鷹) - Male

Yin-zhen's trusted subordinate and personal bodyguard.

- Jimmy Au 歐瑞偉 as Nin Kang-yiu (年羹堯) — Male

Yeuk-bik's older brother, a military commander. He gains Yinzhen's trust for his fairness and non-corrupt ways of dealing with government matters. Became ambitious and corrupted after the Northwest campaign, coerces Yeuk Bik to be a concubine of the Yizhen Emperor in order to consolidate power for himself.

- Yu Tze-ming 余子明 as Lee Tak-chuen (李德全) - Male

Emperor Kang-xi's personal and trusted eunuch. Would later commit suicide after supporting Yunsi in his unsuccessful bid to become Emperor.

- Yu Yang 于洋 as Cheung Ting-yuk (張廷玉) - Male

Imperial government chancellor.

==== City folks ====
- Ram Chiang 蔣志光 as Wu Si-to (鄔思道) — Male

Tin-po's restaurant landlord. He runs his own Chinese medicine shop. He's a Chinese doctor and scholar. He's also Kei Mo-suet's mentor. He later becomes a key advisor for Yin-zhen.

- Helen Ng 吳香倫 as Kei Chau-kuk (紀秋菊) - Female

Kei Mo-suet's mother. Assists Mo-suet in the streets when performing martial arts.

- May Chan 小寶 as Siu To (小桃) - Female

Nin Yeuk-bik's maid. Hates all foods that are stinky. Hates Tin-po because she thinks his "salted fish" buns stinks. Her name sounds the same as "small stomach" in Cantonese which is a parody of her physical appearance since she is a plump girl.

=== Cameo appearances ===
- King Kong 金剛 as Bunmatsu gorō (文松五郎) - Male

Japanese imperial chef who challenges a Chinese imperial chef to a fried rice challenge and wins. Finds Tin-po's "salted fish" buns very tasty and delicious but still insults Tin-po as a lower level cook than him.

- KK Cheung 張國強 as Chin Tak-choi (錢德才) - Male

Imperial government official who took part in Yinreng's government gold robbery. Yin-reng murders him via strangulation to dispose of any evidence linking him to the crime.

- Suet Nei 雪妮 as a palace lady in episode 10, and 24. She has a relationship with the Great Chef.

== Production ==
=== Casting ===
A 60-second sales production trailer of Gilded Chopsticks, which was then known as Food for the Slaves, was first unveiled at TVB's Jade Drama segment at the Programme Presentation 2013 on 8 November 2012. The trailer starred Raymond Lam as Yongzheng, Ron Ng as the imperial chef, Fala Chen as Lu Siniang, Nancy Wu as her accomplice, Sharon Chan as Imperial Noble Consort Nian, and Susan Tse as Empress Dowager Renshou. Although the sales presentation cast was only signed on to film the trailer, Tommy Leung, director of TVB's dramatic production department, expressed that the characters in Gilded Chopsticks were written with the sales presentation cast in mind.

In early December 2012, Raymond Lam turned down his role, citing scheduling conflicts. Wong Wai-sing was subsequently announced to be the serial's executive producer days later.

Wong Cho-lam joined the cast in late December 2012. Following the announcement, both Ron Ng and Sharon Chan were reported to have turned down their roles due to a schedule clash. Fala Chen, burnt out from the long filming schedules of Will Power, did not want to pick up another project too quickly and turned down her role. Wong then offered Chen's role to Linda Chung, who turned it down as well. Wong finally settled down with casting Joey Meng as Lu Siniang. As both Meng and Wong Cho-lam were starring cast members in Wong's Inbound Troubles, Wong proceeded to bring the rest of the Inbound Troubles cast over to Gilded Chopsticks, which included Louis Cheung, Bob, and May Chan. Essentially, Roger Kwok was by default set to portray the role of Yongzheng, but as Kwok was booked to film Lee Yim-fong's new Qing Dynasty drama during the production period of Gilded Chopsticks, he had to turn down the role. In late January 2013, Ben Wong was announced to take the role of Yongzheng. In early February 2013, Nancy Wu was confirmed to star as Nian.

=== Filming ===
A costume fitting press conference was held on 26 January 2013. The serial began filming in Hong Kong's TVB Studios in early March 2013. Production would be relocated to Hengdian World Studios in later months.

== Viewership ratings ==
| Week | Episodes | Date | Average Points | Peaking Points |
| 1 | 01－05 | February 10–14, 2014 | 28 | 29 |
| 2 | 06－10 | February 17–21, 2014 | 27 | 28 |
| 3 | 11－15 | February 24–28, 2014 | 29 | 31 |
| 4 | 16－20 | March 3–7, 2014 | 29 | - |
| 5 | 21－25 | March 10–14, 2014 | 30 | 31 |

== International broadcast ==
- Malaysia - 8TV (Malaysia)
