= Eliza Sam =

Canadian actress based in Hong Kong (born 1984)

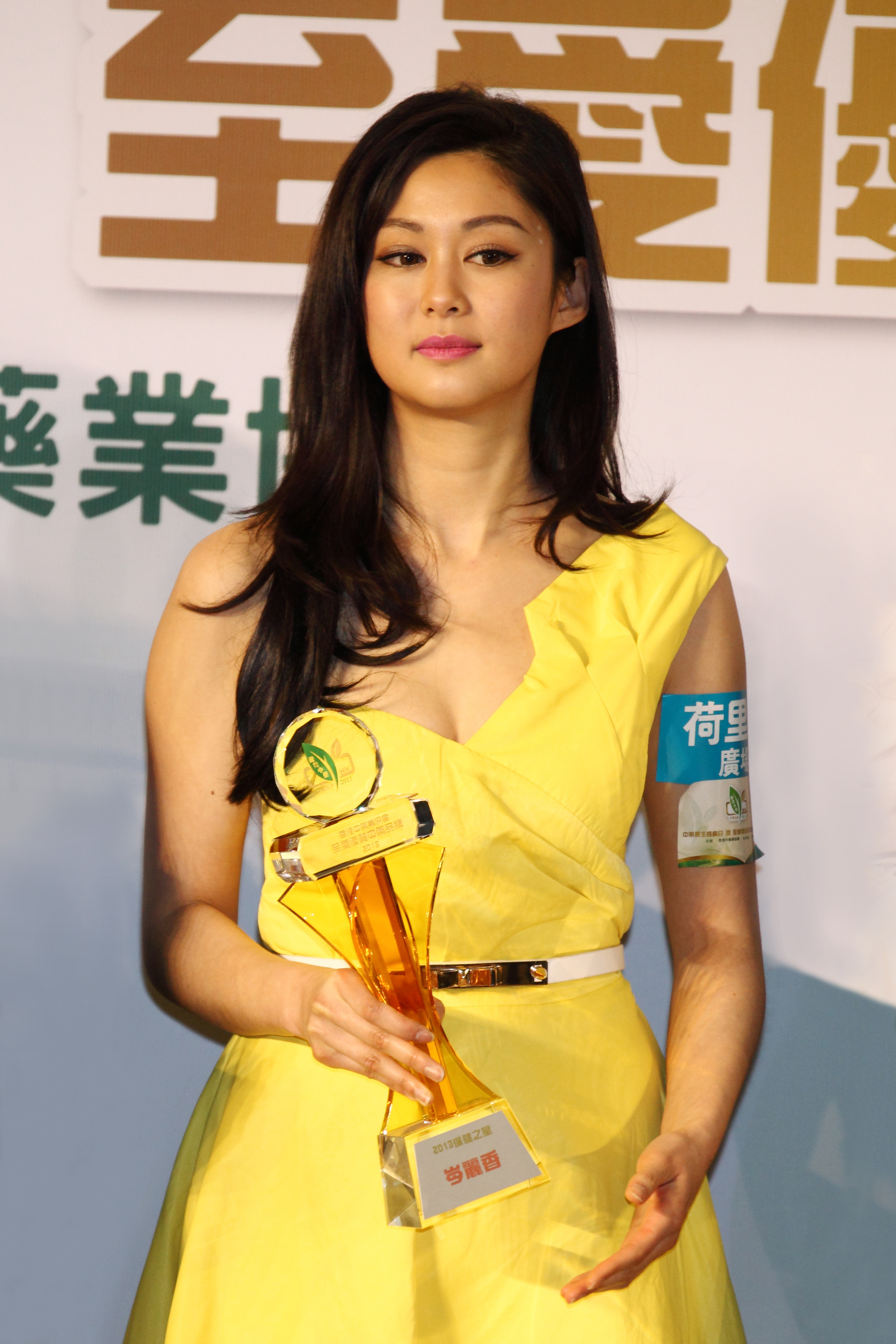
- Sam in 2014
- Born: 17 November 1984 (age 42); Vancouver, Canada
- Education: Kwantlen Polytechnic University
- Occupation: Actress
- Years active: 2010–present
- Spouse: Joshua Ngo (m. 2016)
- Children: 2 sons
- Awards: Miss Chinese Vancouver 2009 Miss Chinese International 2010 TVB Anniversary Awards – Most Improved Female Artiste; 2013 Inbound Troubles, Triumph in the Skies II, Sniper Standoff, The Hippocratic Crush II TVB Star Awards Malaysia – TVB Most Promising Female Artiste; 2013 Triumph in the Skies II, Sniper Standoff, The Hippocratic Crush II StarHub TVB Awards – TVB Most Improved Artiste; 2014

Chinese name
- Traditional Chinese: 岑麗香
- Simplified Chinese: 岑丽香
Transcriptions
Standard Mandarin
- Hanyu Pinyin: Cén Lìxiāng
Yue: Cantonese
- Jyutping: sam4 lai6 hoeng1

Eliza Sam Lai-Heung (Chinese: 岑麗香; born 17 November 1984) is a Hong Kong actress, formerly under contract in TVB. She won the Miss Chinese Vancouver Pageant in 2009, and went on to win the 2010 Miss Chinese International Pageant.

After winning the Miss Chinese Vancouver title 2010, Sam was involved supporting organizations such as the Canadian Cancer Society and S.U.C.C.E.S.S. She won the World Chinese Entrepreneur Scholarship in January 2010, hosted by The 4th World Chinese Entrepreneurs Convention, Canada Founding & Development Society.

== Biography ==
=== Early life ===
Sam's family are Hoa, with parents of Chinese descent from Vietnam, and grandparents from Guangdong and Fujian. She was born and raised in Vancouver, Canada. Sam had also stated publicly that she is a Christian.

Sam graduated from Surrey's Kwantlen Polytechnic University in 2010, with a bachelor's degree in Business as well as a diploma in Marketing Management and a diploma in Fashion Design and Technology. She was an English teacher prior to participating in Miss Chinese International.

=== Career ===
After winning the Vancouver pageant, Sam represented Vancouver in the Miss Chinese International Pageant 2010 organized by TVB. During her final speech (which was to void points from the previous performance segments), Sam talked about her Cantonese being weak, and thus spending one year to practice and improve her Cantonese. She won the competition under the new voting system. Later, she signed with TVB. With her role in the 2012 drama Divas in Distress, Sam rose to popularity and got her nickname "Princess Heung Heung" (Chinese: 香香公主).

In 2013, Sam won the Most Improved Female Artiste award at the 2013 TVB Anniversary Awards.

In mid-June 2018, Sam announced on her social media that her eight-year contract with TVB had come to an end.

In February 2020, Sam returned to TVB to film the family drama Plan "B", which was broadcast in June 2021.

== Personal life ==
In October 2015, Sam was revealed by the media that she was dating a 6-feet-tall and robust man. On 2 December 2016, she openly acknowledged her engagement on social media with her out of industry boyfriend Joshua Ngo. The manager company acknowledged and blessed them. The couple's wedding was held in Vancouver on 18 December 2016.

On 6 December 2018, Sam announced on social media that she was 5 months pregnant and her due date was April 2019.

On 25 March 2019, Sam posted a photo of her son Jacob on Instagram, announcing that her son was born under the name "BooBoo", but did not disclose the date of birth. Sam shared that Jacob's Chinese name is Ngo Chu-hin (吳主軒), which was given to him by her parents-in-law.

On 3 February 2021, Sam announced on social media that she was pregnant with her second child. On 13 May 2021, she announced on Instagram that her second son, Cashew (小腰果), was born under the name "JuJu", but did not disclose the date of birth.

== Filmography ==
=== Television dramas ===
Year	Title	Role	Notes
2012	Ghetto Justice II	Bobo	Ep. 7-9
2012	Divas in Distress	Hannah Heung Nai-hing (香乃馨)	Major Supporting Role
2012	The Confidant	Lady in waiting (秀女)	Introduced in Ep.19
2013	Inbound Troubles	young Mung Lo (青年夢露)	Cameo; TVB Anniversary Award for Most Improved Female Artiste; TVB Star Awards Malaysia for TVB Most Promising Female Artiste
2013	Triumph in the Skies II	Tracy Mok Man-chui (莫文翠)	Supporting Role; TVB Anniversary Award for Most Improved Female Artiste; TVB Star Awards Malaysia for TVB Most Promising Female Artiste
2013	Sniper Standoff	Lai Chun (黎珍)	Major Supporting Role; TVB Anniversary Award for Most Improved Female Artiste; TVB Star Awards Malaysia for TVB Most Promising Female Artiste
2013	The Hippocratic Crush II	Che Hiu-tung (車曉彤)	Major Supporting Role; TVB Anniversary Award for Most Improved Female Artiste; TVB Star Awards Malaysia for TVB Most Promising Female Artiste
2013-2014	Coffee Cat Mama	Grace Bin Kwai-chi (邊貴知)	Major Supporting Role
2014	Never Dance Alone	Carrie Tong Ka-lai (湯嘉麗)	Supporting Role
2014	Come On, Cousin	young Chai Chow-shui (青年齊秋水)	Cameo
2014	Lady Sour	San Cha (山楂)	Major Supporting Role
2015	Limelight Years	Yanto Tong Yan (唐欣)	Major Supporting Role
2015	Brick Slaves	Peggy Chuk Pik-kei (祝碧姫)	Major Supporting Role; TVB Star Awards Malaysia for Top 16 Favourite TVB Drama Characters
2015	Under the Veil	Lau Yee / Hung Mao-Dan (柳衣 / 洪牡丹)	Main Role; StarHub TVB Award for My Favourite TVB Female TV Characters
2015	Angel In-the-Making	Halley Kei Lok (祁樂)	Main Role
2016	My Dangerous Mafia Retirement Plan	Joyce Ho Fuen-sum (何寬心)	Main Role; TVB Star Awards Malaysia for Top 15 Favourite TVB Drama Characters
2016	Inspector Gourmet	"BabyKaka" Tong Ka-ka (唐嘉嘉)	Main Role
2017	Oh My Grad	Lau Lau (柳妞)	Major Supporting Role
2017	Heart and Greed	Belle Hui Pui-yee (許貝兒)	Main Role
2018	Apple-colada	Barika Lee Lok-yee (李樂怡)	Main Role
2021	Plan "B"	Grace Hong Nga-yau (康雅悠)	Main Role

=== Music video appearances ===
Year	Singer	Title	Position
2011	Raymond Lam 林峯	One Person 人一個	Female lead

=== Films ===
- The Fortune Buddies (2011)
- I Love Hong Kong 2012 (2012)
- Special Female Force (2016)
- I Love You, You're Perfect, Now Change! (2019)

=== TVB programs ===
- Big Fun Canton 《千奇百趣省港澳》 (2011)
- Kansai Banzai 《關西風雨》 (2011)
- Miss Chinese International Pageant 2012 《國際中華小姐競選》 (Appearing as the reigning Miss Chinese International winner) (2012)
- Dolce Vita 《港生活·港享受(明珠生活)》 (2012)
- The Armur River 《黑龍江》 (2012)
- TV Funny 《玩轉三周1/2》 (2012)
- Neighborhood Treasures 4 《千奇百趣高B班》 (2012)
- Big Fun SE Asia 《千奇百趣東南亞》 (2012)
- Nat Around The World 《叻哥遊世界》 (2013)
- Feastival A La Stars 《明星愛廚房》 (2014-2015)
- A Starry Homecoming 《星星探親團》 (2016)
- My Handy Man 《乜都攪掂晒》 (2016)

== Awards and nominations ==
Year	Award	Category	Work	Result
2012	TVB Anniversary Awards	Most Improved Female Artiste	Ghetto Justice II, Divas in Distress, The Confidant, The Amur River	Nominated
2012	TVB Anniversary Awards	Best Supporting Actress	Divas in Distress	Nominated
2012	TVB Anniversary Awards	Most Popular Female Character	Divas in Distress as Heung Nai-hing	Nominated
2013	TVB Anniversary Awards	Most Improved Female Artiste	Inbound Troubles, Triumph in the Skies II, Sniper Standoff, The Hippocratic Crush II	Won
2013	TVB Anniversary Awards	Best Supporting Actress	Sniper Standoff	Nominated
2013	TVB Star Awards Malaysia	Most Promising Female Artiste	Triumph in the Skies II, Sniper Standoff, The Hippocratic Crush II	Won
2014	TVB Anniversary Awards	Best Supporting Actress	Never Dance Alone	Nominated
2014	TVB Star Awards Malaysia	Favourite TVB Supporting Actress	Coffee Cat Mama	Nominated
2014	TVB Star Awards Malaysia	Top 15 Favourite TVB Drama Characters	Coffee Cat Mama as Bin Kwai-chi	Nominated
2014	TVB Star Awards Malaysia	Favourite TVB On-Screen Couple	Coffee Cat Mama with Bosco Wong	Nominated
2014	StarHub TVB Awards	TVB Most Improved Artiste	—N/a	Won
2014	StarHub TVB Awards	My Favourite TVB Supporting Actress	Never Dance Alone	Nominated (Top 10)
2014	StarHub TVB Awards	My Favourite TVB Female TV Characters	Coffee Cat Mama as Bin Kwai-chi	Nominated (Top 12)
2015	TVB Anniversary Awards	Best Actress	Under the Veil	Nominated
2015	TVB Anniversary Awards	Most Popular Female Character	Under the Veil as Lau Yee / Hung Mao-dan	Nominated
2015	TVB Star Awards Malaysia	Favourite TVB Supporting Actress	Brick Slaves	Nominated
2015	TVB Star Awards Malaysia	Top 16 Favourite TVB Drama Characters	Brick Slaves as Chuk Pik-kei	Won
2015	StarHub TVB Awards	My Favourite TVB Actress in a Leading Role	Under the Veil	Nominated
2015	StarHub TVB Awards	My Favourite TVB Female TV Characters	Under the Veil as Lau Yee / Hung Mao-dan	Won
2015	StarHub TVB Awards	TOKYO BUST EXPRESS SASSY AWARD	N/A	Nominated
2015	StarHub TVB Awards	Favourite TVB Onscreen Couple	Lady Sour (with Him Law)	Nominated (Top 6)
2016	TVB Anniversary Awards	Best Actress	My Dangerous Mafia Retirement Plan	Nominated
2016	TVB Anniversary Awards	Most Popular Female Character	My Dangerous Mafia Retirement Plan as Ho Foon-sum	Nominated
2016	TVB Star Awards Malaysia	Favourite TVB Actress in a Leading Role	My Dangerous Mafia Retirement Plan	Nominated
2016	TVB Star Awards Malaysia	Top 15 Favourite TVB Drama Characters	My Dangerous Mafia Retirement Plan	Won
2016	TVB Star Awards Malaysia	Favourite TVB Onscreen Couple	Inspector Gourmet (with Kenneth Ma)	Nominated
2016	TVB Star Awards Malaysia	Favourite TVB Host	My Handy Man	Nominated
2016	StarHub TVB Awards	My Favourite TVB Actress in a Leading Role	My Dangerous Mafia Retirement Plan	Nominated
2016	StarHub TVB Awards	My Favourite TVB Female TV Characters	My Dangerous Mafia Retirement Plan as Ho Foon-sum	Nominated
2016	StarHub TVB Awards	My Favourite TVB Host	My Handy Man	Nominated (Top 6)
2017	TVB Anniversary Awards	Best Actress	Heart and Greed	Nominated
2017	TVB Anniversary Awards	Most Popular Female Character	Heart and Greed as Hui Pui-yee	Nominated
2017	TVB Star Awards Malaysia	Favourite TVB Supporting Actress	Oh My Grad	Nominated
2017	TVB Star Awards Malaysia	Top 15 Favourite TVB Drama Characters	Oh My Grad as Lau Lau	Nominated
2021	TVB Anniversary Awards	Best Actress	Plan "B"	Nominated
2021	TVB Anniversary Awards	Most Popular Onscreen Partnership	Plan "B" (with Kenneth Ma)	Nominated
2021	TVB Anniversary Awards	Favourite TVB Actress in Malaysia	Plan "B"	Nominated

- 2010 World Chinese Entrepreneur Scholarship: Academic, community service and leadership award

Awards and achievements
Miss Chinese Vancouver
Preceded by Cici Chen 陳娜良子	Miss Chinese Vancouver Champion; 2009	Succeeded by Susan Su 蘇慧文
Preceded by Shu Yi Lu 陸舒怡	Miss Photogenic; 2009	Succeeded by Susan Su 蘇慧文
Miss Chinese International
Preceded by Christine Kuo 苟芸慧	Miss Chinese International Pageant 2010 Champion; 2010	Succeeded by Kelly Cheung 張曦雯
