= Lucky Star 2015 =

2015 Hong Kong-Chinese-Taiwanese film by Ching Long

- 吉星高照2015
- Directed by: Ching Long
- Production companies: Pearl River Pictures Co., Ltd; East Light Film; Yingshitang Co., Ltd 喜羊羊电影工作坊有限公司; China Movie Channel SARFT
- Distributed by: Pearl River Pictures Co., Ltd; East Light Film; Intercontinental Film（Hongkong）Co., Ltd
- Release dates: 1 March 2015 (China); 5 March 2015 (Hong Kong)
- Running time: 86 minutes
- Countries: Hong Kong; China; Taiwan
- Languages: Cantonese; Mandarin
- Box office: CN¥4 million (China)

Lucky Star 2015 (Chinese: 吉星高照2015) is a 2015 comedy film directed by Ching Long. The film is a co-production between Hong Kong, China and Taiwan. It was released in China on 1 March 2015, and was released in Hong Kong on 5 March 2015.

== Cast ==
- Eric Tsang
- Wong Cho-lam
- Ella Chen
- Dada Chan
- Wen Chao
- Kingdom Yuen
- Yuen Qiu
- Jessica Jann
- Gabriel Wong
- Wong Yat-fei
- Tin Kai-man
- Lollipop F
- Cheng Man-fai
- Fung Min-hun
- Tats Lau
- Louis Yuen
- Si Ming
- Koo Ming-wah
- Stephen Au
- Fun Lo
- Yu Mo-lin
- Wen Xiang
- Edward Chui
- Cliff Chan

== Reception ==
By March 1, the film had earned CN¥4 million at the Chinese box office.
