= Lady Sour =

Hong Kong television series

- Official poster
- Also known as: Vinegar Lady; Vinegar Wife
- 醋娘子
- Genre: Period drama, Comedy, Romance
- Created by: Hong Kong Television Broadcasts Limited
- Written by: Tong Gin Ping, Wong Ching Man, Choi Wai Ho, Ngai Hong Yee, Ng Chi Keung
- Directed by: Koon Gwok Wai, Chin Wing Chi, Lam Chi Yan, Law Chun Wai
- Starring: Myolie Wu; Ron Ng; Him Law; Eliza Sam; Jade Leung
- Opening theme: When You Came Into My Life? 是你嗎? by Ron Ng & Myolie Wu
- Composer: Alan Cheung
- Country of origin: Hong Kong
- Original language: Cantonese
- No. of episodes: 20

Production
- Executive producer: Catherine Tsang
- Producer: Poon Ka Tak 潘嘉德
- Production location: Hong Kong
- Editor: Gu Wai Nam 賈偉南
- Camera setup: Multi camera
- Running time: 45 minutes
- Production company: TVB

Original release
- Network: Jade; HD Jade
- Release: 1 December – 28 December 2014

Lady Sour
- Chinese: 醋娘子
- Literal meaning: "Vinegar Wife"
Transcriptions
Standard Mandarin
- Hanyu Pinyin: cù niáng zǐ
Yue: Cantonese
- Jyutping: cou3 noeng4 zi2

Lady Sour (Chinese: 醋娘子; Jyutping: cou3 noeng4 zi2; literally 'Vinegar Wife') is a 2014 Hong Kong costume drama, comedy, romance produced and developed by Hong Kong's Television Broadcasts Limited, starring Myolie Wu, Ron Ng, Him Law, Eliza Sam, and Jade Leung as the main cast. Filming took place from November 2013 to January 2014. The drama was broadcast on Hong Kong's TVB Jade and HD Jade channels between December 1 and December 28, 2014 every Monday through Friday during its 8:30-9:30 pm time slot with a total of 20 episodes.

== Plot ==
Cho Tsing and her mother Cho Cho Bi Yue are itinerant beauticians wandering the country in search of Cho Tsing's missing father. In the course of their wanderings, Cho Tsing falls in love with Tsin Tung and the two become husband and wife.

San Cha has been Tsin Tung's personal maid since childhood, and the two have an understanding that ignites Cho Tsing's jealousy. Cho Tsing's attempts get rid of San Cha by marrying her off backfire when Tsin Tung realises he loves her and takes her as a concubine. Cho Tsing resents having to share a husband with another woman and, when Tsin Tung divorces her, she seeks solace with another man, her former enemy Kai Chun.

== Cast ==
The following names uses Cantonese romanisations

=== Tsin Family ===
Artist	Character	Notes
Lily Leung	Chu On Nin (朱安寧)	Old Lady Tsin; Mother of Tsin Tsung, Tsin Sheung; Grand mother of Tsin Tung
Koo Ming-wah	Tsin Tsung (錢莊)	Son of Chu On Nin; Brother of Tsin Tseung; Tsin Tung's father Kai Sho's husband the name is a pun, the Chinese being a homophone of "bank"
Jade Leung	Kai Sho (計素)	Tsin Tsung's principle wife Kai Chun's sister Cho Cho Bi Yue's good friend first an enemy and subsequently friend of Tsin Sheung the name is a pun, the Chinese being a homophone of "doing sums"
Alice Chan	Tsin Sheung (錢霜)	Chu On Nin's daughter Tsin Tsung's sister Tsin Tung's aunt Fu Sam Yan's coequal wife Sheung Kwun Man's former lover Ning Choi Tze's good friend, subsequently rivals in love first an enemy and subsequently friend of Kai Sho enemy of Cho Tsing and Cho Cho Bi Yue the name is a pun, the Chinese being a homophone of "money box"
Him Law	Tsin Tung (錢通)	Tsin Tsung's son Tsin Sheung's nephew Cho Tsings husband，later ex-husband San Cha's husband
Myolie Wu	Cho Tsing (曹青)	Cho Tai Kung and Cho Cho Bi Yue's daughter Tsin Tung's wife, later ex-wife Kai Chun's enemy later lovers the name is a pun, the Chinese being a homophone of "vinegar keg", which refers to a woman prone to jealousy
Eliza Sam	San Cha (山楂)	Originally Tsin Tung's maid, later concubine and then principle wife
So Yan Chee	So Bik Won (蘇碧雲)	Chu On Nin's personal servant Tsin Tung's former wet nurse

=== Cho family ===
Artist	Character	Notes
Koo Koon Chun	Cho Tai Kung (曹大功)	Cho Cho Bi Yue's husband Cho Tsing's father
Gigi Wong	Cho Cho Bi Yue (曹曹閉月)	beautician Cho Tai Kung's wife Cho Tsing's mother Kai Sho's good friend Tsin Sheung's enemy the name is a pun, Cho Cho Bi being a Chinese homophone of "chatterbox" Cho is both her maiden and married name, she married within her own clan
Myolie Wu	Cho Tsing (曹青)	Cho Tai Kung and Cho Cho Bi Yue's daughter See Tsin family

=== Other cast ===
Artist	Character	Notes
Ron Ng	Kai Chun (計準)	Kai Sho's brother Cho Tsing's enemy later lover the name is a pun, the Chinese being a homophone of "well calculated"
Derek Kok	Fu Sam Yan (傅琛仁)	Local magistrate Ning Choi Tze and Tsin Sheung's husband the name is a pun, the Chinese being a homophone of "love cheat"
Koni Lui	Ning Choi Tze (冷采慈)	Fu Sam Yan's co-equal wife Tsin Sheung's good friend, subsequently rivals in love
Ho Kwan Shing	Sheung Kwun Man (上官文)	Tsin Sheung's former lover Fu Sam Yan's underling
Lo Chun Shun	Sun Jing Yee (辛正義)	Constable; Fu Sam Yan's underling the name is a pun, the Chinese meaning upholder of righteousness

== Development ==
- Lady Sour was originally intended to be the third installment of "Wars of In-laws", but due to Myolie Wu and Bosco Wong's real-life split in 2012 plans to reunite the two main leads were scrapped. Also Liza Wang had to turn down the drama due to schedule conflicts.
- The drama's plot was revealed at TVB's "2014 Sales Presentation". Additional cast was also revealed.
- Him Law was confirmed as the male lead of the drama in July 2013. Lady Sour is Law's first ancient costume drama.
- During the costume fitting ceremony Ron Ng was confirmed as the actual male lead of the drama. Him Law was pushed back as the second male lead.
- The costume fitting ceremony was held on November 11, 2013 at 12:30 pm Tseung Kwan O TVB City Studio One Common Room.
- Filming took place from November 2013 till January 2014.
- Lady Sour is also co-star Eliza Sam's first ancient costume drama. Sam who was born and raised in Vancouver Canada had difficulty pronouncing her lines and understanding the script due to the text written in ancient Chinese grammar.

== Complaints ==
- Ron Ng received numerous audience complaints regarding his over exaggerated acting.

== International Broadcast ==
- Malaysia - 8TV (Malaysia)

== Viewership Ratings ==
#	Timeslot (HKT)	Week	Episode(s)	Average points	Peaking points
1	Mon – Fri 20:30	01–05 Dec 2014	1 — 5	22	23
2	Mon – Fri 20:30	08–11 Dec 2014	6 — 9	22	24
3	Mon – Fri 20:30	16–19 Dec 2014	10 — 13	23	26
4	Mon – Fri 20:30	22–26 Dec 2014	14 — 18	24	26
4	Mon – Fri 20:30	28 Dec 2014	19 — 20	27	29
Total average				23	29
