= Angela Tong =

Hong Kong actress

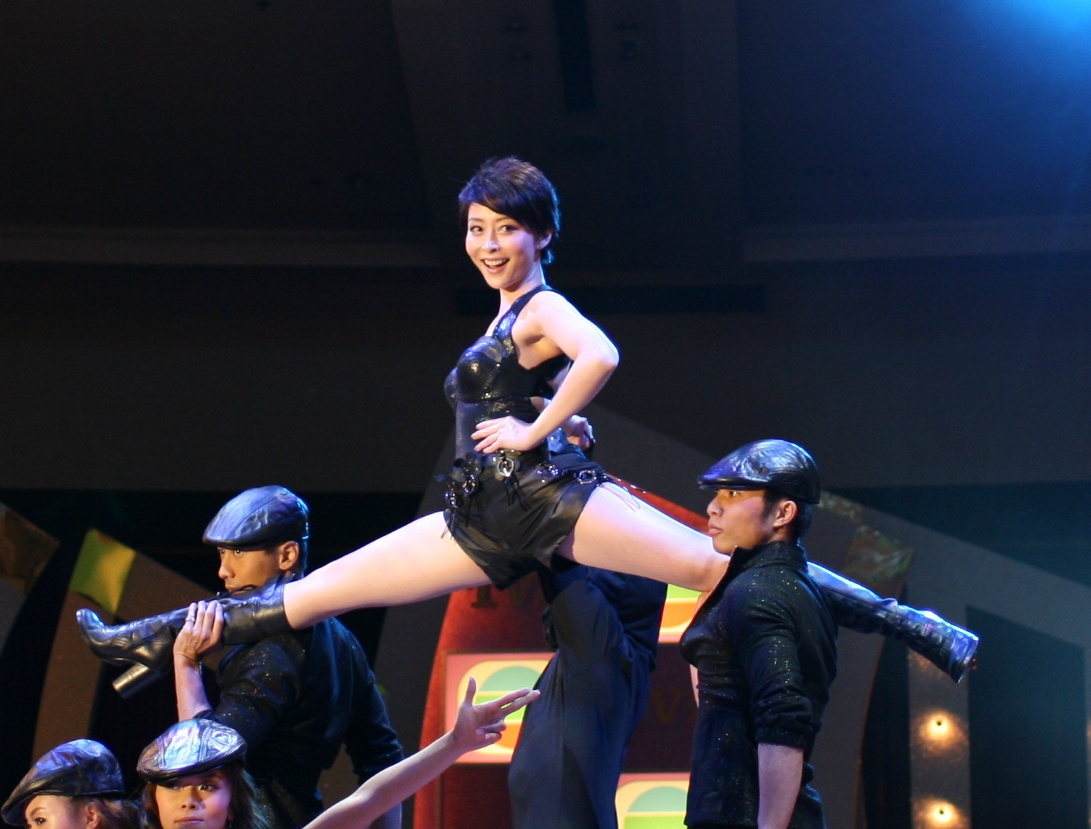
- Born: 30 June 1975 (age 51); Montreal, Quebec, Canada
- Occupation: Actress
- Spouse: Chin Kar-lok (m. 2012)
- Children: Alyssa Chin; 10 March 2013 (age 13) Kassidy Chin; 23 September 2015 (age 10)
- Awards: TVB Anniversary Awards – Best Supporting Actress; 2005 Life Made Simple

Chinese name
- Traditional Chinese: 湯盈盈
- Simplified Chinese: 汤盈盈
Transcriptions
Standard Mandarin
- Hanyu Pinyin: Tāng Yíngyíng
Yue: Cantonese
- Jyutping: tong1 jing4 jing4
- Website: Official site

Angela Tong (born 30 June 1975) is a Hong Kong actress. She was born in Montreal, Quebec, Canada with family roots in Shunde, Guangdong, China. She was Miss Chinese Montreal 1995. She was educated in Concordia University.

== Pageant life ==
After winning the first place in Miss Chinese Montréal Pageant in 1994, Tong represented Montréal to compete in the Miss Chinese International Pageant 1995. Although she only reached the Top 12 in the pageant, she was approached by TVB with an acting contract.

== Acting career ==
Tong has been in numerous TVB dramas since 1995, but mostly supporting roles and is mostly cast as a showgirl or "the other woman". After for 10 years, her big break finally came with the TVB series Life Made Simple (阿旺新傳) playing a physically unattractive girl with a heart of gold and a wonderful singing voice called "Lee Siu Ho (李笑好)".

The role won her critical acclaim, winning the Best Supporting Actress award at the TVB 37th Anniversary Awards in November 2005.

Her portrayal of Lee Siu Ho was so popular that TVB composed a primetime special called Ho Is Beside You (好在你左右) as well as the 12-episode variety program Always Smiling (笑口常開), both with Angela hosting in character as Lee Siu Ho.

== Personal life ==
Tong married Chin Ka-lok, whom she had been dating for five years, on 13 November 2012, the two becoming the first couple to marry in Ocean Park's panda enclosure. They held a wedding banquet on the 15th, an event attended by many co-stars and colleagues of Hong Kong's entertainment industry. Tong has two daughters, Alyssa and Kassidy.

== Filmography ==
=== Film ===
- Last to Surrender (1998)
- Bio Zombie 生化壽屍 (1998)
- Last Ghost Standing 鬼請你睇戲 (1999)
- There is a Secret in my Soup 人頭豆腐湯 (2001)
- A Very Short Life 短暫的生命 (2009)
- Walking The Dead (2010)
- I Love Hong Kong (2011)
- The Sorcerer and the White Snake 白蛇傳說 (2011)
- I Love Hong Kong 2012 (2012)
- Buddy Cops 刑警兄弟 (2016)

=== TV series ===
- Journey to the West (1996) (cameo)
- Armed Reaction (1997)
- Taming of the Princess (1997)
- Healing Hands (1998)
- Full House (1998)
- A Loving Spirit (1999)
- Feminine Masculinity (1999)
- Broadcast Life (2001)
- Gods of Honour (2001)
- Square Pegs (2002–03)
- Ups and Downs in the Sea of Love (2003)
- The Driving Power (2003)
- The Legend of Love (2003)
- My Family (2005)
- The Conqueror's Story (2005)
- Fantasy Hotel (2005)
- Women on the Run (2005)
- Life Made Simple (2005)
- The Prince's Shadow (2005)
- Women on the Run (2005)
- Under the Canopy of Love (2006)
- Bar Bender (2006)
- Love Guaranteed (2006)
- The Slicing of the Demon (2007)
- Best Selling Secrets (2007–2008)
- The Drive of Life (2007)
- Marriage of Inconvenience (2007)
- The Money-Maker Recipe (2008)
- Love Exchange (2008) (Guest)
- The Entrepreneurial Beauties (2009) (Guest)
- In the Chamber of Bliss (2009)
- A Fistful of Stances (2010)
- Every Move You Make (2010)
- Home Troopers (2010–2011)
- Forensic Heroes III (2011)
- When Heaven Burns (2011–2012)
- Til Love Do Us Lie (2011–2012)
- Wish and Switch (2012)
- House of Harmony and Vengeance (2012)
- Inbound Troubles (2013)
- Triumph in the Skies II (2013) (Guest star ep. 4)
- Queen Divas (2014)
- My "Spiritual" Ex-Lover (2015)
- Come Home Love: Dinner at 8 (2016)
- Come Home Love: Lo and Behold (2017)

== Awards and titles ==
- Miss Chinese Montréal 1994
- Top 10 semifinalist at Miss Chinese International 1995
- 2005 TVB Anniversary Awards – Best Supporting Actress
- 2005 Metro Showbiz Hit Television Awards – Hit Supporting Actress

Awards and achievements
TVB Anniversary Awards
Preceded by Sheren Tang for War and Beauty	Best Supporting Actress; 2005 for Life Made Simple	Succeeded by Shirley Yeung for Always Ready
