= Coffee Cat Mama =

- Promo poster
- 貓屎媽媽
- Genre: Modern, Comedy drama
- Created by: Hong Kong Television Broadcasts Limited
- Written by: Chan Kam-Ling; Wong Kwok-fai
- Starring: Bosco Wong; Michelle Yim; Eliza Sam; Nancy Wu; Vincent Wong; Koo Ming-wah; Miki Yeung; May Chan
- Theme music composer: Eric Kwok
- Opening theme: "鬥快" (Compete in speed) by Hubert Wu
- Country of origin: Hong Kong
- Original languages: Cantonese; Mandarin; Indonesian
- No. of episodes: 20

Production
- Producer: Nelson Cheung 張乾文
- Production location: Hong Kong
- Camera setup: Multi camera
- Running time: 45 minutes
- Production company: TVB

Original release
- Network: Jade; HD Jade
- Release: 23 December 2013 – 17 January 2014

Related
- Bounty Lady; Queen Divas

Coffee Cat Mama (Traditional Chinese: 貓屎媽媽; literally "Cat Feces Mama") (Chinese: 猫屎妈妈; Jyutping: maau1 si2 maa1 maa1) is a Hong Kong drama modern comedy series which aired from 2013 to 2014. It was produced by TVB, and stars Bosco Wong, Michelle Yim, Nancy Wu, Vincent Wong and Eliza Sam as the main leads. Filming began in June 2013 and finished in August of the same year.

== Synopsis ==
After Song Chau Bo (Miki Yeung 楊愛瑾), left her boyfriend, Bao Chi Tai (Bosco Wong), he assumes the role of a mother and a father to his 8-year-old son. Wanting to properly raise his son, he switches careers numerous times to find a more accommodating work schedule. In hopes to help out their housemate, So Sik (Koo Ming Wah) and Yam Ka Ching (Vincent Wong) recommend Chi Tai work at a coffee shop as a brewer. The coffee shop is run by three women plagued by a confusing dramatic family story, which completely changes Chi Tai’s life.

Ma See Nga (Michelle Yim) is the biological mother of Bin Kwai Chi (Eliza Sam). When her husband died, he left his coffee shop business to See Nga, Kwai Chi, as well as his mistress, So Mei (Nancy Wu). The three women are supposed to continue running the business cooperatively. However, See Nga believes she should be in charge of the coffee shop, and starts making her own decisions.

After hiring Chi Tai as an employee, See Nga secretly persuades him to be her spy, informing her of everyone else’s each and every move. At the same time, she trains him as a professional coffee brewer. At first, Kwai Chi despises Chi Tai, but seeing he is willing to sacrifice himself for his son, she eventually changes her perception. She helps raise the young boy and eventually falls in love with Chi Tai.

Always wishing Kwai Chi would one day become a doctor, See Nga strongly disapproves of her daughter’s relationship with Chi Tai. She is afraid Kwai Chi would give up pursuing the professional career. On the other hand, So Mei also does not want to see Kwai Chi ending up with her job, and decides to team up with See Nga. Together, the two women come up with all sorts of tactics to destroy Kwai Chi and Chi Tai’s relationship.

== Cast ==
- Michelle Yim as Marcia Ma Si Nga (馬思雅), Richard's ex-wife and Grace's biological mother.
- Bosco Wong as Pao Chi Tai (鮑址堤), had a baby with Bobo.
- Nancy Wu as So Mei (蘇眉), Richard's wife, Grace's step-mother and Yan Ka Ching's love interest.
- Vincent Wong as Yan Ka Ching (任嘉政)
- Eliza Sam as Grace Pin Kwai Tsz (邊貴知), Marcia's and Richard's daughter; So Mei's step-daughter.
- Koo Ming-wah as So Sik (蘇晰), So Mei's brother, Pao Chi Tai's and Yan Ka Ching's good friend.
- Miki Yeung as Bobo, had a baby with Pao Chi Tai
- Yu Yeung as Richard (died before the series started), Marcia's ex-husband, So Mei's husband and Grace's father.
- Jonathan Cheung as Fan Fat, Leader of a small gang; Mr and Mrs bean coffee roaster; Bobo's ex-boyfriend.

== Development ==
The original English title of the drama was "Mr. & Mrs. Bean", it was renamed to "Coffee Cat Mama" to sound more like the Chinese title pronunciation.

== Ratings ==
Week	Episodes	Date	Average Points	Peaking Points
1	01－05	December 23–27, 2013	23	26
2	06－10	December 30, 2013 －January 3, 2014	25	28
3	11－15	January 6 － 10, 2014	25	27
4	16－20	January 13－17, 2014	25	28
