= Wong Cho-lam =

Hong Kong actor

- 王祖藍
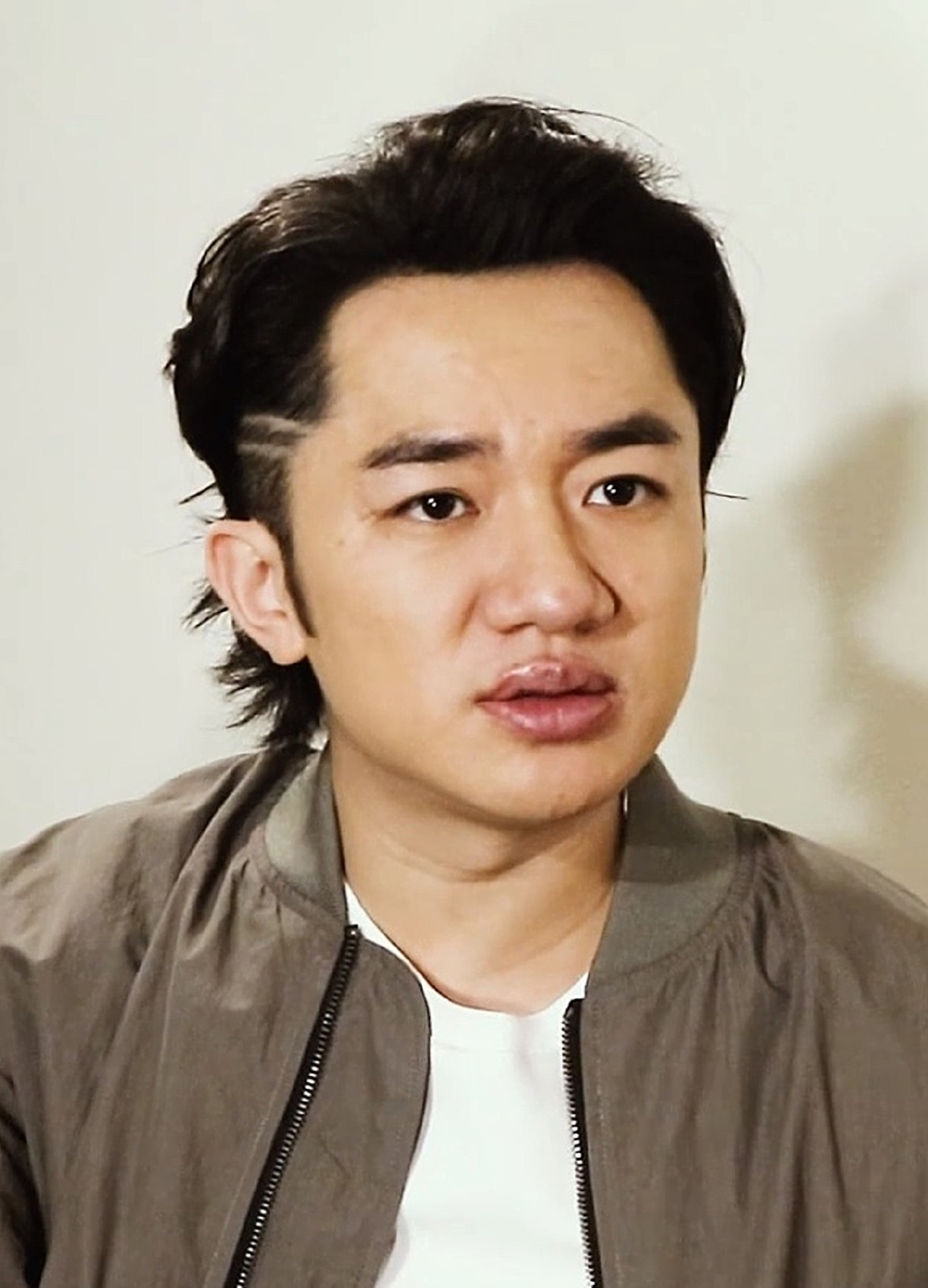
- Wong in 2019
- Born: Wong Ho-yin; 9 January 1980 (age 46); British Hong Kong
- Education: Hong Kong Academy of Performing Arts – Bachelor of Arts
- Occupations: Actor; television and radio host; talent manager; singer; lyricist; comedian
- Years active: 1998–present
- Height: 1.62 m (5 ft 4 in)
- Spouse: Leanne Li (m. 2015)
- Children: Gabrielle Wong (daughter); Hayley Wong (daughter)
- Awards: RTHK Top 10 Gold Songs Awards; Best Prospect Award (Bronze); 2008 (for his performance in 2008)TVB Anniversary Awards – Most Improved Actor; 2008 Best Selling Secrets; Super Trio Supreme; D.I.E.; Miss Hong Kong 2008; Best Presenter; 2009 Super Trio Supreme; 2010 Fun with Liza and Gods; 2014 Walk The Walk, Talk The Talk
- Musical career
- Origin: Hong Kong
- Label: EEG Music Plus (2008–2014)

Chinese name
- Traditional Chinese: 王祖藍
- Simplified Chinese: 王祖蓝
Transcriptions
Standard Mandarin
- Hanyu Pinyin: Wáng Zǔlán
Yue: Cantonese
- Jyutping: Wong^{4} Zou^{2} laam^{4}

Birth name
- Traditional Chinese: 王浩賢
- Simplified Chinese: 王浩贤
Transcriptions
Standard Mandarin
- Hanyu Pinyin: Wáng Hàoxián

Wong Cho-lam (born Wong Ho-yin; 9 January 1980) is a Hong Kong entertainer.

== Background ==
He graduated from The Hong Kong Academy For Performing Arts in 2003 with First Honors in Bachelor of Arts majoring in acting. He is a member of the Composers and Authors Society of Hong Kong.

His most noted work includes his performance in the long-running popular TVB series, Best Selling Secrets (同事三分親) portraying the character, Lau Wah (樓華). In 2008, he signed on as an artist with EEG (英皇娛樂), and became one of the presenters of Super Trio Supreme (鐵甲無敵獎門人).

He was a co-host during the 2008 and 2010 Miss Hong Kong Pageant with Eric Tsang. He won Most Improved Actor at the 2008 TVB Awards.

Wong's debut album Wong Everywhere was released on 27 November 2008. Out of 10 songs in the album, Wong wrote the lyrics for eight of them, with each song covering different areas in life, including family, friends, love, work, etc. which all aimed to share positive messages with the audience.

In 2012, Wong gained popularity in mainland China through his performance on the Hunan Television variety show Your Face Sounds Familiar, in which contestants impersonate celebrity performers.

Wong left EEG Plus in 2014. From 2014 to 2018, Wong was one of the cast members of Zhejiang Television game show Keep Running, the Chinese version of the Korean show Running Man.

From 2021 to 2023, Wong served as the Chief Creative Officer of TVB.

== Personal life ==
Wong was a primary school classmate with singer Joey Yung, and in 2012, Wong discovered he is a distant cousin of Eason Chan in his visit to his ancestral home in Dongguan, China. On 19 November 2014, Wong publicly proposed to Leanne Li during live TVB Anniversary show, and was witnessed by TVB officials and colleagues. They married on Valentine's Day in 2015. The couple are devoted Protestants, who have both publicly declared sexual abstinence before marriage. Wong is one of the Hong Kong celebrities that voice support for the National People's Congress decision on Hong Kong national security legislation. In December 2020, Wong welcomed the birth of his second daughter Hayley.

== Filmography ==
=== Television ===
Year	Title	Role	Notes
2006	Glittering Days	Ma Wai-ming	
2007	Heavenly In-Laws	Cheng Sau-fu	
2007	Best Bet	Gwong Ji	
2007-2008	Best Selling Secrets	Lau Wah	TVB Award for Most Improved Actor
2007	Heart of Greed	intellectually disabled boy	
2007	The Family Link	waiter	
2007	On the First Beat	Ah Shui	
2008	D.I.E.	Yun Wai-ping (Theo)	TVB Award for Most Improved Actor
2008-2010	Off Pedder	Tang Lai-gwan	
2009-2010	The Beauty of the Game	Yuen Kwok-fan	
2010	Don Juan DeMercado	Gung Yan-tung	
2011	Super Snoops	Hung Chak-nam	Nominated — TVB Anniversary Award for My Favourite Male Character (Top 15)
2013	Inbound Troubles	Choi Sum	
2014	A Time of Love	Narrator (various)	Episode 4 - Japan cartoon/comic theme
2014	Gilded Chopsticks	Ko Tin-po	
2014	Come On, Cousin	Yau Tin	
2016	Happy MiTan	Wang Zu Cai	
2017	Nezha and Yang Jian	Nezha	
2017	Oh My Grad	Choi Sum / Yau Tin	He reprise his two roles from Inbound Troubles and Come On, Cousin as recurring characters.

=== Film ===
Year	Title	Role	Notes
1999	Sunshine Cops	Student	
2006	Marriage with a Fool	Lam	
2007	Blessing Through Love	Siu Wong	
2007	Beauty and the 7 Beasts	Bruce	
2008	L For Love, L For Lies	Loan shark	
2008	La Lingerie	Antonio	
2008	Connected	Salesman	
2009	Short of Love	Jack Lam	
2010	72 Tenants of Prosperity	Kin Chai	
2010	Just Another Pandora's Box	Guard of Cao	
2010	La Comédie humaine	Soya	
2010	The Jade and the Pearl	Ling Kam Hoi (凌感開), a storyteller	
2011	I Love Hong Kong	Youth Tok Shui-lung	
2011	The Fortune Buddies	Wong Luk Lam (Blue)	
2012	My Sassy Hubby	Mr.Lee	
2013	I Love Hong Kong 2013	Sung Samsung	
2013	Princess and the Seven Kung Fu Masters	Horny Four / Kung Fu master	
2013	Ip Man: The Final Fight	Blind Chan	
2013	The Midas Touch	Gibson	Special guest appearance
2013	Firestorm	Correctional Service Superintendent	
2014	Black Comedy	Officer Johnny To	
2014	Horseplay	Tung Yin	
2014	Delete My Love	So Boring	
2014	Rise of the Legend	Big Tooth	
2015	Running Man	Himself	
2015	Lucky Star 2015		
2016	Mr. High Heels		
2016	Mission Milano	Amon	
2017	Buddies in India		
2017	The Golden Monk		
2019	I Love You, You're Perfect, Now Change!		
2020	Enter the Fat Dragon		

=== Variety ===
Year	Title	Role	Notes
2008	Super Trio Supreme	Host	
2012–2013, 2015, 2017	Happy Camp	guest	
2014–2018	Keep Running	Cast member	
2015	Celebrity Honeymooners	Host	
2016	Ace vs Ace	Cast member	
2017	Ace vs Ace 2	Cast member	
2018	没想到吧	Cast member	

=== Educational TV shows ===
Year	Title	Network	Notes/Ref.
2000	青春心曲	ETV	Teenage love story

== Discography ==
- Cho-lam Everywhere (2008)
- "Love For Real"(2010)
- All About Loving You (2011)
- "Love For Real 2"(2011)
- Fook Lu Shau Brother (2012)
- "Love For Real 3"(2012)
- "Curious Case"(2013)
- "Love For Real 4"(2013)

== Awards and nominations ==
Year	Award	Category	Nominated work	Result
2007	2007 TVB Anniversary Awards	Best Supporting Actor	Best Selling Secrets	Nominated
2007	2007 TVB Anniversary Awards	Favourite Male	Best Selling Secrets	Nominated
2007	2007 TVB Anniversary Awards	Most Improved Actor		Nominated
2008	2008 TVB Anniversary Awards	Most Improved Actor		Won
2008	2008 TVB Anniversary Awards	Best Host		Nominated
2008	2008 Next TV Awards	Most Promising Actor		Won
2008	2008 RTHK Top 10 Gold Songs Awards	Most Potential Singer		Won
2008	2008 Music Pioneer Chart Awards	Best New Singer		Won
2009	2009 TVB Anniversary Awards	Best Host		Won
2010	2010 TVB Anniversary Awards	Favourite Male	Don Juan DeMercado	Nominated
2010	2010 TVB Anniversary Awards	Best Host		Won
2011	2011 TVB Anniversary Awards	Favourite Male	Super Snoops	Nominated
2011	2011 Jade Solid Gold Best Ten Music Awards	Best Performance		Won
2012	2012 TVB Anniversary Awards	Best Host		Nominated
2012	2012 Music Pioneer Chart Awards	Improved Singer		Won
2013	2013 TVB Anniversary Awards	Best Actor	Inbound Troubles	Nominated
2013	2013 TVB Anniversary Awards	Favourite Male	Inbound Troubles	Nominated
2013	2013 TVB Anniversary Awards	Best Host		Nominated
2013	2013 Next TV Awards	Top Ten TV Artist		Won
2014	2014 TVB Anniversary Awards	Best Actor	Gilded Chopsticks	Nominated
2014	2014 TVB Anniversary Awards	Favourite Male	Come On, Cousin	Nominated
2014	2014 TVB Anniversary Awards	Favourite TV Song	Gilded Chopsticks	Nominated
2014	2014 TVB Anniversary Awards	Best Host		Won
2015	2015 Sina Web Festival	Best All-around Artist		Won
2015	2015 Sina Web Festival	Breakthrough Artist		Won
2015	2015 Reality Show Star Power List	Best Reality Show Star		Won

Awards and achievements
TVB Anniversary Awards
Preceded by Amigo Choi for Sccop; E-Buzz; Jade Solid Gold; Enjoy Yourself Tonight 2007	Most Improved Actor; 2008 for Best Selling Secrets; Super Trio Supreme; D.I.E.; Miss Hong Kong 2008	Succeeded by Pierre Ngo for Rosy Business; Sweetness in the Salt
