= Louis Cheung =

Hong Kong singer, actor and songwriter

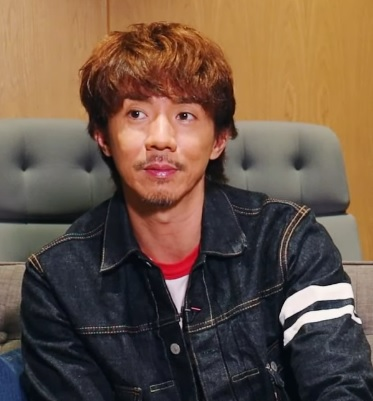
- Cheung in November 2022
- Born: 11 January 1980 (age 46); British Hong Kong
- Occupations: Singer; songwriter; actor
- Years active: 1984–present
- Spouse: Kay Tse (m. 2007)
- Children: 2

Chinese name
- Traditional Chinese: 張繼聰
- Simplified Chinese: 张继聪
- Musical career
- Origin: Hong Kong
- Genres: Cantopop
- Instruments: Vocals; guitar

Louis Cheung (Chinese: 張繼聰; born 11 January 1980) is a Hong Kong singer, songwriter, and actor. He is an alumnus of The Hong Kong Academy for Performing Arts, majoring in acting. His first play was in 1997, and he has performed in a total of more than 20 stage plays, including the classic "A Streetcar Named Desire", in which he played Stanley Kowalski.

== Career ==
In 1984, Cheung started acting in front of the camera, including a well-known ad for Nestle instant milk's "The dairy cows raised at 15th floor". He has taken part in more than 100 TV shows, movies and ads.

Cheung joined the music industry in 2005, winning "Ultimate Song Chart Awards Presentation - Best Male Newcomer (Bronze)" in the same year, and "Ultimate Song Chart Awards Presentation - Music Composer Award" and "Ultimate Song Chart Awards Presentation - Singer-songwriter Award." He has received much recognition for his creative achievements. He has also written many songs for other famous Canto-pop singers, such as Eason Chan, Leo Ku, Hacken Lee, Eric Sun, and Joey Yung. His famous works include "Woodgrain", "Hard to Detect" and so on.

Cheung joined TVB as a contracted artist in 2012. His first drama as a contracted artist with the station was "Inbound Troubles", playing the supporting role Sung Wai-chiu. In 2013 and 2014, he acted in "Brother's Keeper", "Gilded Chopsticks", "Black Heart White Soul" and "Come On, Cousin," receiving critical acclaim for his ability to do both comedy and drama. He received five nominations at the TVB Anniversary Awards in 2014, and ultimately won the "Most Improved Actor" award. In 2015, he starred in "Raising the Bar" as Quinton Chow Chi-pok, the second male lead. In August 2015, he was promoted to leading actor for the first time, starring in Momentary Lapse of Reason with Best Actress winner Tavia Yeung, newcomer Lin Xiawei, and Matt Yeung.

== Personal life ==
Cheung married singer Kay Tse in 2007. They were both students in a Tai Po high school. Their son, James, was born that same year. Their daughter, Karina, was born in 2017.

== Discography ==
=== Studio albums ===
- To Be or Not To Be (2005)
- 將繼衝 (2006)
- Kidult (2007)
- Check Point (2007)
- Rock N Break (2008)
- B.C (2009)
- 456 (2010)
- 5+ (2011)
- X (2014)

=== Singles ===
Year	Album	Song	903	RTHK	997	TVB	Note
2005	To Be Or Not To Be	Mad U So	3	13		7	
	To Be Or Not To Be	彈弓手	17				
	To Be Or Not To Be	慷慨			13		
	To Be Or Not To Be	賭城風雲	15				
	將繼衝	烏蠅鏡	20				Featuring Kay Tse
2006	將繼衝	K型	2	8	5		
		只有我是最愛你			3		
	將繼衝	囉唆	5		9		
	將繼衝	烏龜		15	7	2	
	將繼衝	將...繼...衝	16				
	Kidult	愛你你咪理	4	15	5		
	Kidult	四小強	14		10		
2007	Kidult	寧願晏D瞓	1	9	3	2	
	Kidult	Good Luck	19				
	Check Point	下世紀的地圖	20		4		
	Check Point	白鳥	8	19	8		
	Check Point	Single Bell	3	4	8		
2008	Rock N Break	石縫	16	10	2		
	Rock N Break	Gimme A Break	6	5	4		
	Rock N Break	循環線	1		3		
	Rock N Break	花生			9		
2009	Rock N Break	一手舞曲	16				
	Today Special	爸爸聲		9	2		Featuring Hacken Lee
	B.C.	永和號	1	3	2	5	
	B.C.	這一秒	3	16	2	5	
	B.C.	港九情	3				
2010	456	亂世佳人	1		4	2	

(*)Currenting charting

== Songwriting works for other singers ==
As composer:

- "九" by Jeremy Lee (2022)
- "越州公路193" by Denis Kwok (2022)

== Filmography ==
=== Film and television ===
Year	Title	Role	Notes/Ref.
2002	Star Wars: Episode II – Attack of the Clones	Anakin Skywalker	Voice (Cantonese)
2005	Star Wars: Episode III – Revenge of the Sith	Anakin Skywalker / Darth Vader	Voice (Cantonese)
2005	Howl's Moving Castle	Howl	Voice (Cantonese)
2005	Fullmetal Alchemist the Movie: Conqueror of Shamballa	Roy Mustang	Voice (Cantonese)
2005	Be with You	Mio Aio	Voice (Cantonese)
2006	Garfield: A Tail of Two Kitties	Jon Arbuckle	Voice (Cantonese)
2006	Cocktail		Cameo appearance
2006	Tales from Earthsea	Prince Arren / Lebannen	Voice (Cantonese)
2007	The Girl Who Leapt Through Time	Chiaki Mamiya	Voice (Cantonese)
2008	Love is Elsewhere	Martin Hui	
2008	True Women for Sale	Social worker	Cameo appearance
2009	Short of Love	Dr. Fung	
2010	Cloudy with a Chance of Meatballs	Flint Lockwood	Voice (Cantonese)
2010	The Legend Is Born – Ip Man	Customs officer	Cameo appearance
2011	ICAC Investigators 2011	"Grasshopper" Yip Tze-sin	TV drama Episode: "The Black & White Line"
2012	My Sassy Hubby	Louis	
2013	Inbound Troubles	Sung Wai-chiu	TV drama
2013	Brother's Keeper	Keung Yung	TV drama
2014	Gilded Chopsticks	Yunsi, the Eighth Prince	TV drama
2014	Black Heart White Soul	Marco Ma Kai-Yuen	TV drama
2014	Come On, Cousin	Mario Ma	TV drama
2015	Raising the Bar	Louis Chow Tsz-pok	TV drama
2015-2016	Come Home Love 2	Sheung Kin-san	Season 2 Main cast
2015	Undercover Duet		
2015	Momentary Lapse Of Reason	Kam Wah	TV drama
2015	Keeper of Darkness	Ah-Chung	
2015	Ip Man 3	Tsui Lik	
2016	Happiness	Kam	
2016	Line Walker		
2016	Two Steps from Heaven	Tim Yau Tin-hang	
2017	Moana	Maui	Voice (Cantonese)
2017	Shock Wave	Lam Chun	
2017	My Ages Apart	Lau Hang (Walking)	TV drama
2018	Agent Mr Chan	Mr Tai	
2018	Lucid Dreams		
2018	L Storm	Ho Tai-sing (何大成)	
2018	The Lingering		
2018	The Leaker		
2018	Hotel Soul Good		
2019	A Lifetime Treasure		
2019	P Storm	Wong Lam-luk	
2019	Fagara		
2019	A Witness Out of the Blue	Larry Lam	
2020	Breakout Brothers	Chan Ho-ching	
2020	Enter the Fat Dragon	Commander Huang	
2021	G Storm	Wong Luk-lam	
2022	Table for Six	Bernard Chan	
2022	The Narrow Road	Chak	
2022	We Got Game	Chan Seung Po	ViuTV drama
2023	Where the Wind Blows		
2024	Table for Six 2	Bernard Chan	
2025	My Best Bet	Jing	
2025	Back to the Past	Stone	
2025	Golden Boy		
2026	Kung Fu Soccer	Referee	

=== Music video appearances ===
- Error - Love On Duty (愛情值日生) (2022)

== Awards and nominations ==
=== Film and television ===
Year	Award	Category	Nominated work	Result
2016	35th Hong Kong Film Awards	Best Supporting Actor	Keeper of Darkness	Nominated
2022	59th Golden Horse Awards	Best Leading Actor	The Narrow Road	Nominated
2023	29th Hong Kong Film Critics Society Awards	Best Actor	The Narrow Road	Won
2025	44th Hong Kong Film Awards	Best Actor	Golden Boy	Nominated

=== Music ===
- 2008 Metro Hit Music Awards: 循環線 was a song composed by Louis himself which won the newly composed award #1.
- Commercial Radio Hong Kong – 2007 Ultimate (Chik Chak) Best composer award (叱咤樂壇作曲人 大獎)
- Commercial Radio Hong Kong – 2007 Ultimate (Chik Chak) Producer/singer silver award (叱咤唱作人銀獎)
