= Short of Love =

2009 Hong Kong film by James Yuen

- Directed by: James Yuen
- Written by: Dennis Law; James Yuen
- Produced by: Patrick Tong
- Starring: Wong Cho-Lam; Kate Tsui; Race Wong; JJ Jia; Angelababy
- Cinematography: Choi Sung Fai; Ko Chiu-Lam
- Edited by: Azrael Chung
- Production companies: BIG Pictures; Hong Kong Star X Media; Local Production
- Distributed by: Newport Entertainment
- Release date: 5 June 2009
- Running time: 106 minutes
- Country: Hong Kong
- Language: Cantonese

Short of Love (Chinese: 矮仔多情 is a 2009 Hong Kong comedy-romance film directed by James Yuen.

== Plot ==
Wong Cho-Lam stars as Jack Lam, a self-employed stock trader who keeps his fortune amidst the 2008 financial tsunami, but loses his gold-digging girlfriend Lily (bikini model Chrissie Chau). Now without a main squeeze, Jack meets the helpful and super-cute Angel (Angelababy), who advises him that he should learn to help others instead of just helping himself. The idea is that a revamped, selfless outlook on life will lead Jack to newfound success with love.

Jack agrees to become a good guy, whereupon his life does a 180 and he's showered with opportunities for love, Jack does get plenty of chances with the ladies, but everything seems to happen arbitrarily and not necessarily because he turns over a new leaf....

== Cast ==
- Wong Cho-lam - Jack Lam
- Kate Tsui - Scar Sandy
- Race Wong - Christy
- JJ Jia - Caca
- Angelababy - Angel
- Chrissie Chau - Lily
- Lee Man-kwan
- Ella Koon - Jack's Secretary
- Louis Cheung - Dr. Fung
- Lynn Hung - Tall Woman
- Cutie Mui - Blind Foot Massager
- Eddie Ng
- I Love You Boyz - Night Club Security Guards
- Louis Yuen - Wah Dee (Spoof of Andy Lau)
