= Chinese Canadians in the Greater Toronto Area =

Chinese Canadians in Toronto
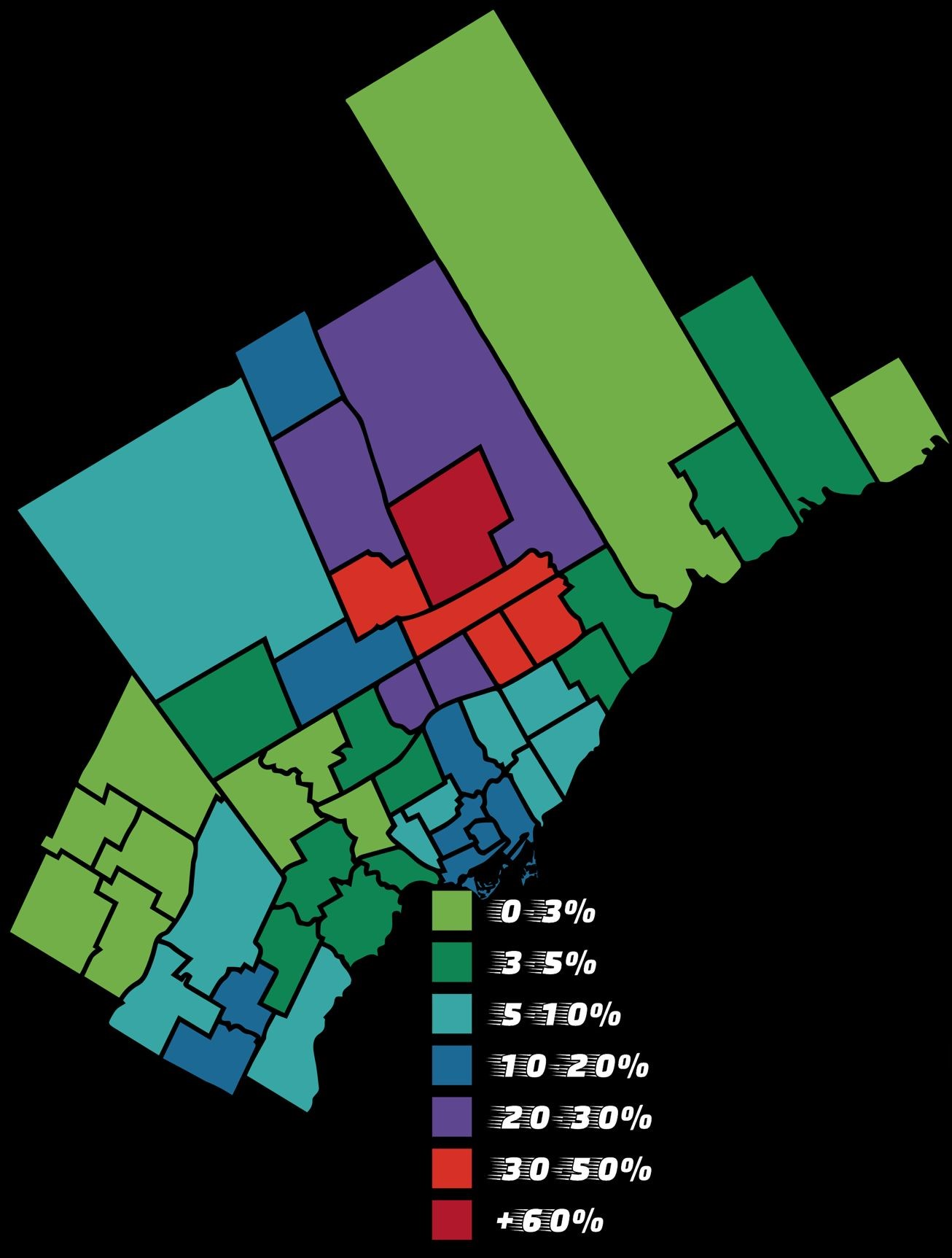
- Population distribution of Chinese Canadians in Toronto by federal electoral district, 2021 census

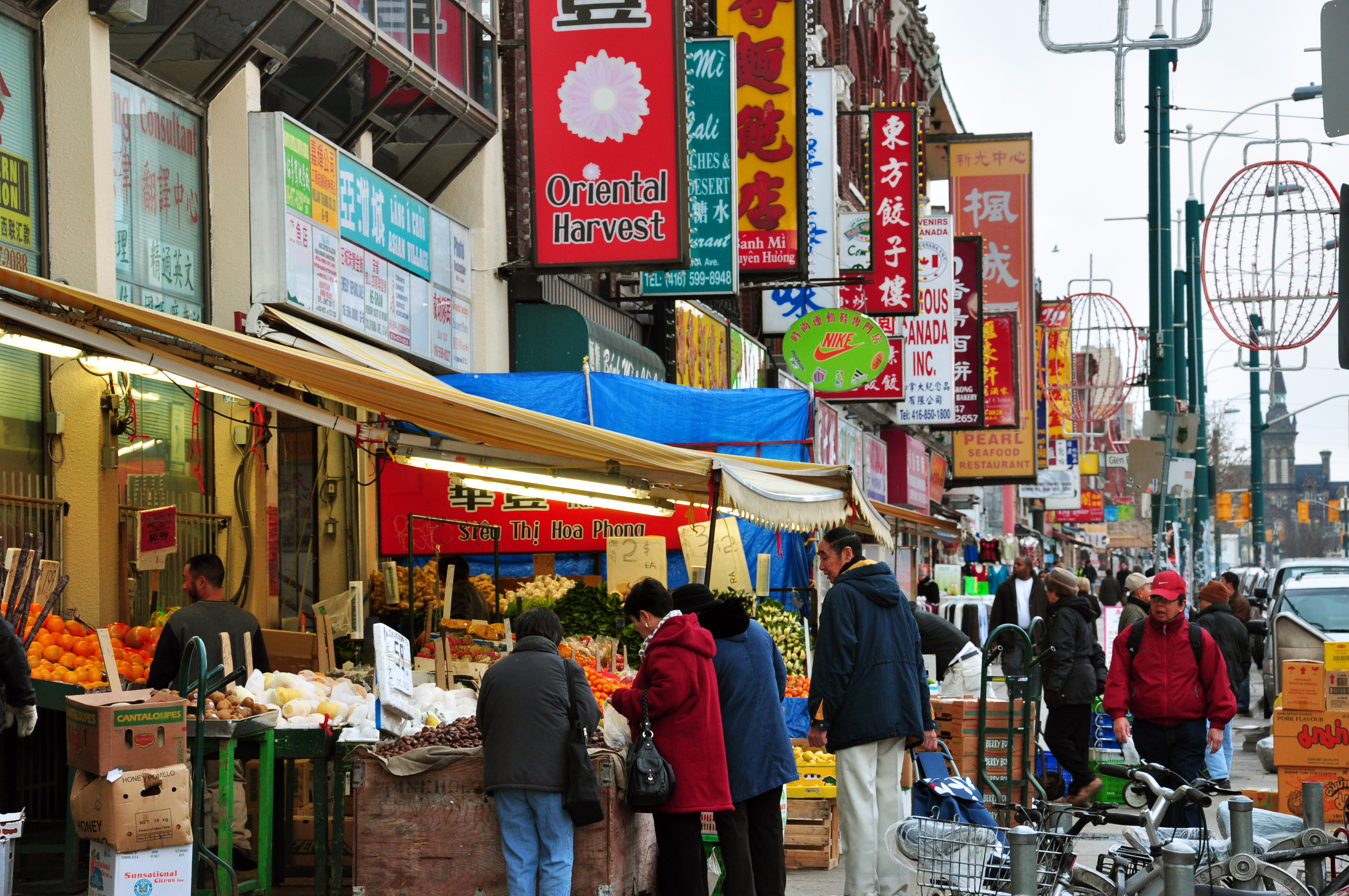
Chinatown, Toronto

The Chinese Canadian community in the Greater Toronto Area was first established around 1877, with an initial population of two laundry owners. While the Chinese Canadian population was initially small in size, it dramatically grew beginning in the late 1960s due to changes in immigration law and political issues in Hong Kong. Additional immigration from Southeast Asia in the aftermath of the Vietnam War and related conflicts and a late 20th century wave of Hong Kong immigration led to the further development of Chinese ethnic enclaves in the Greater Toronto Area. The Chinese established many large shopping centres in suburban areas catering to their ethnic group. There are 679,725 Chinese in the Greater Toronto Area as of the 2021 census, second only to New York City for largest Chinese community in North America.

Olivia Chow was the first Chinese-Canadian mayor of Toronto following the 2023 Toronto mayoral by-election.

== History ==
In 1877 the first Chinese persons had been recorded in the Toronto city directory; Sam Ching and Wo Kee were laundry business owners. Additional Chinese laundries opened in the next several years. Toronto's earliest Chinese immigrants originated from rural communities of the Pearl River Delta in Guangdong, such as Taishan and Siyi, and they had often arrived on the west coast of Canada before coming to Toronto. Many of them worked in small businesses, as merchants, and in working class jobs.

In 1885, there were 100 Chinese persons living in Toronto. The Chinese initially settled the York Street-Wellington Street area as Jews and other ethnic groups were moving out of that area. Several Toronto newspapers in the early 20th century expressed anti-Chinese sentiment through their editorials. By 1911, the Chinese population in Toronto reached 1,000. In 1910, the redevelopment of York-Wellington forced many Chinese to relocate to The Ward, the part of Queen Street West between Elizabeth Street and York Street. Less than ten years later redevelopment again forced the Chinese to move once more. This time they settled in the former Jewish housing on Elizabeth Street, which became the first organized Chinatown. The Chinese Immigration Act of 1923 stopped Chinese immigration inflow into Toronto, causing a decline in residents and businesses in the community. The Great Depression augmented the decline in the Chinatown.

By the 1950s and 1960s ethnic Chinese who could speak English fluently have moved out to the suburbs but continued to shop in Chinatown. Many ethnic Chinese began studying in universities in Toronto during these decades. In addition, Chinese immigrants began settling in Toronto once again after the Canadian government opened its doors to Chinese immigrants by adopting a point system immigration selection process in 1967. Many of these immigrants were fluent in English, had skilled jobs and/or were well-educated. They arrived from Hong Kong after the leftist riots in Hong Kong in 1967. Until the 1970s, the Toronto area pan-Chinese community "was small", according to the late Professor Bernard H. K. Luk, author of "The Chinese Communities of Toronto: Their Languages and Mass Media".

Vietnamese Chinese were among the people fleeing Vietnam after the fall of Saigon in 1975. Many of them did not speak Vietnamese. In general most ethnic Chinese originating from Southeast Asia arrived in Canada as refugees.

Around 1980 Toronto's ethnic Chinese population became the largest in Canada with communities in the Old Chinatown and East Chinatown neighbourhoods. Until then, Vancouver had the largest ethnic Chinese population in Canada. Many Hong Kongers immigrated to Toronto in the 1980s and 1990s, partly because of the impending handover of Hong Kong to mainland China in 1997. Canada had resumed allowing independent immigrants into the country in 1985 after a temporary suspension that began in 1982. The Chinese population in the Toronto area doubled between 1986 and 1991. Many of the new arrivals settled in the northern suburbs of North York and Scarborough in the then-Metropolitan Toronto, as well as in Markham and Richmond Hill in York Region. The estimated total number of Hong Kongers who immigrated to the Toronto area from the 1960s to the 1990s was fewer than 200,000.

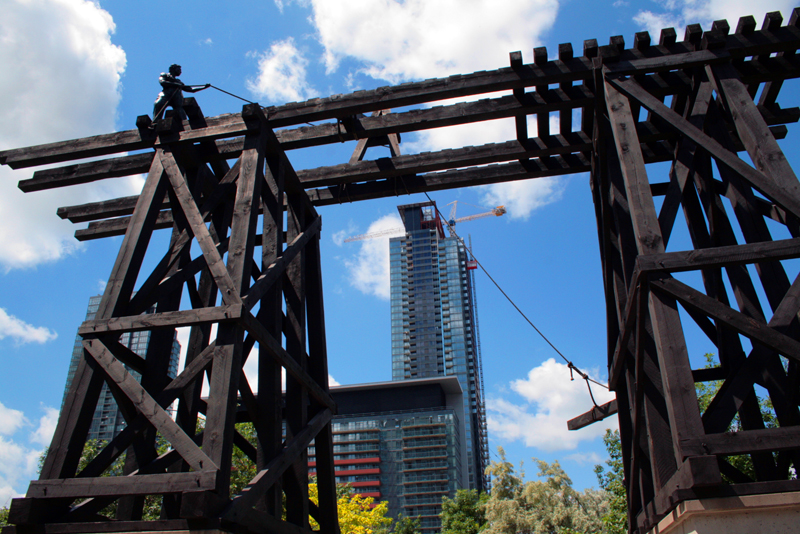
A monument that commemorates the Chinese labourers who worked on the Canadian transcontinental railway was erected in Toronto in 1989

In 1989, the Chinese Canadian community, along with the City of Toronto, commissioned a monument in order to commemorate the Chinese labourers who helped build the transcontinental railway across Canada in the late 19th century. Situated off Blue Jays Way and Navy Wharf Court, it features a sculpture and two boulders at the base of the sculpture. The boulders originate from the Rocky Mountains, with former employers of the Chinese labourers, Canadian Pacific Railway, providing the boulders.

Retired Senator Vivienne Poy wrote that there were fears of ethnic Chinese expressed in Toronto area media by 1990. There were 240,000 ethnic Chinese living in the Toronto area in 1991.

Between 1979 and 1999, a total of 360,000 immigrants from China, most of them originating from Hong Kong, settled in the GTA. Toronto continued to have the largest Chinese population in Canada in 2000.

By the turn of the 21st century, immigration from Hong Kong has significantly fallen. Mainland China has become the largest source of Chinese immigrants since 2000.

== Geographic distribution ==
Chinese communities include Chinatown, Toronto.

According to The Path of Growth for Chinese Christian Churches in Canada by Chadwin Mak, in 1994, there were about 100,000 ethnic Chinese in Scarborough, 65,000 in Downtown Toronto, 60,000 in the eastern portion of the former city of Toronto, 40,000 in North York, and 10,000 in Etobicoke/Downsview. In addition, there were 35,000 in Thornhill/Markham, 30,000 in Oakville/Mississauga, 5,000 in Brampton, 2,000 in Oshawa, and 1,500 in Pickering. The total of Metropolitan Toronto and the other regions combined was 348,500.

By 2012 Markham and Richmond Hill had absorbed many Chinese immigrants.

== Demographics ==
Chinese immigrants include those who immigrated from Hong Kong, mainland China and Taiwan. Southeast Asia-origin Chinese in Toronto originated from Indonesia, Malaysia, the Philippines, and Vietnam. Other ethnic Chinese immigrants originated from the Caribbean, Korea, South Africa, and South America.

As of 2000 there were an estimated 50,000 ethnic Chinese who immigrated from Vietnam living in the Toronto area, making up almost half of the metropolitan area's total number of Vietnamese Canadians.

As of the 2021 census, there were 679,725 Chinese Canadians, making up 10.95% of the total metropolitan area

== Language ==
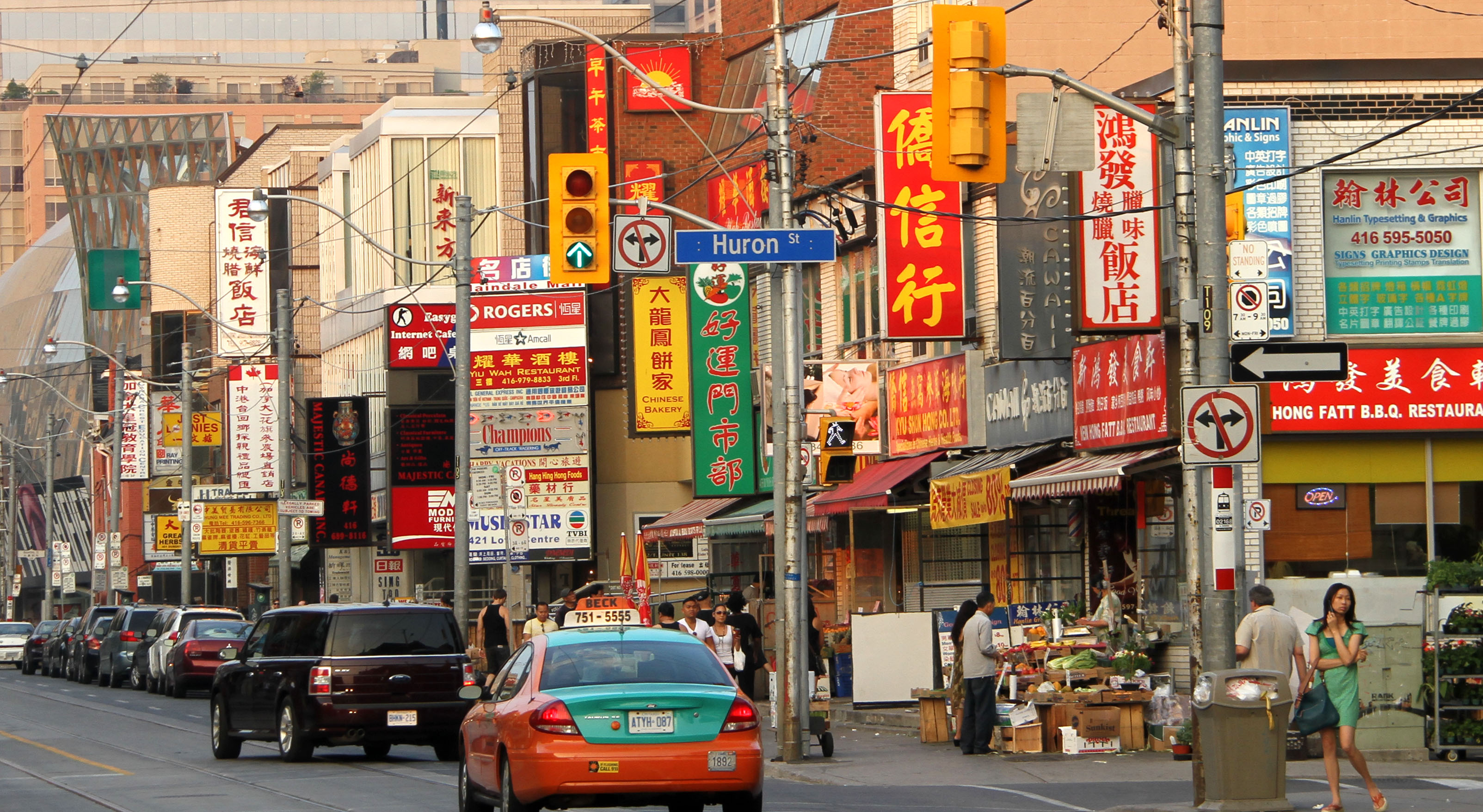
Chinese signs along Dundas Street in the Toronto Chinatown

=== Varieties of Chinese ===
Different subgroups of Chinese people in Toronto speak different varieties of Chinese, and differences in language between these subgroups differentiates them. The original Chinese immigrants to Toronto who originated from the Siyi area of Guangdong province spoke the Siyi dialects of Yue Chinese, as well as the Taishanese dialect of Yue; as of 2000 many speakers of the Siyi dialects, including the immigrants and their children, lived in the Toronto Chinatown. As of 2000 the Chinese variety with the largest representation was Metropolitan Cantonese, due to the two major waves of Hong Kong immigration in the 20th century that made Hong Kong Chinese the largest subgroup in Toronto. In the 1990s there were speakers of Cantonese Chinese in the traditional Toronto Chinatown; and also in Agincourt, Willowdale, and other areas in Toronto, as well as Markham and Richmond Hill.

Mandarin Chinese gained a significant presence due to immigration from mainland China and Taiwan; In the 1990s, some Mandarin speakers from the mainland and/or speakers of northern Chinese dialects lived in Toronto, Richmond Hill, and Markham. Mandarin speakers from mainland China and Taiwan lived in Willowdale and other parts of northern Toronto. In the 1950s, before large scale Mandarin-speaker immigration occurred, the Toronto Chinese community used Mandarin on an occasional basis.

Other varieties of Chinese, including Hakka, Hokkien, and Min Nan are spoken by ethnic Chinese from various countries. Willowdale and other areas of Northern Toronto had speakers of Taiwanese Min Nan, and speakers of other Chinese varieties lived in other communities in the Toronto area, including Downsview in Toronto and Mississauga.

In 2006, according to Statistics Canada, there were 166,650 in the Greater Toronto Area who had Cantonese as their native language, while there were 62,850 persons who had Mandarin as their native language. By 2009 Mandarin was becoming the dominant variety of Toronto's Chinese community.

=== Use and prevalence of Chinese ===
Many Canadian-born Chinese who grew up in Toronto prior to the 1970s are monolingual English-speakers because they were discouraged from learning their parents' native languages. However Canadian-born Chinese growing up in subsequent eras are encouraged to learn Chinese after Canadian society adopted multiculturalism as a key value.

The 1996 Canadian census stated that the second largest language group in the Toronto area was people who spoke Chinese.

As of the 1997 Chinese Consumer Directory of Toronto there were 97 computer and software businesses, 20 interpreters and translators, 19 sign makers, and eight paging services. Luk wrote that the figures from the directory "indicate the broad range of Chinese language use" throughout the Toronto Chinese community, in society and in private meetings and transactions, even though the directory was "not exhaustive".

In 2000 Bernard Luk wrote "All in all, a Cantonese-speaker living in Toronto should experience no difficulty meeting all essential needs in her or his own language," and that speakers other varieties of Chinese also have services provided in their varieties although the statement about having all needs met is "less true" for non-Cantonese varieties.

== Education ==
=== Supplementary Chinese education ===
As of 2000 various Toronto-area school boards have free heritage Chinese language classes for elementary-level students, with most of them being Cantonese classes and some of them being Mandarin and Taiwanese Min Nan classes. Some schools had elementary-level Chinese classes during the regular school day while most had after-school and weekend Chinese classes. Some Toronto-area high schools offered Saturday elective courses in Chinese, with most teaching Cantonese and some teaching Mandarin.

In addition, many for-profit companies, churches, and voluntary organizations operate their own Saturday supplementary Chinese language programs and use textbooks from Hong Kong and/or Taiwan. The 1997 Chinese Consumer Directory of Toronto stated that the area had over 100 such schools; Bernard Luk stated that many Saturday schools were not listed in this directory since their parent organizations were very small and did not use yellow pages, so the list was "by no means[...]exhaustive". Many of these schools' students previously attended school in Asian countries and their parents who perceive the classes to be more challenging than those offered by the public schools. There are heritage Chinese classes organized by Hakka persons, and a number of Hakka prefer to use these classes; most of them originated from the Caribbean.

In 1905 Presbyterian churches in Toronto maintained nine Chinese schools.

=== University education ===
The University of Toronto (U of T) has a Chinese Student Association. Reza Hasmath, author of A Comparative Study of Minority Development in China and Canada, stated in 2010 that "most confessed their immediate social network comprised mainly of those of Chinese descent." It also has a number of courses and programs related to Chinese and Chinese Canadian studies. They are available from the Asian Institute, Department of East Asian Studies, Department of History, University College, etc.

The Richard Charles Lee Canada-Hong Kong Library in the downtown campus at the U of T has the largest collection of Hong Kong studies and Canada-Hong Kong studies outside of Hong Kong. Its collection and events are open to the public.

York University has York Centre for Asian Research that offers programs and events related to Chinese studies.

== Institutions ==
There were 105 associations and 25 social service agencies that were listed in the 1997 Chinese Consumer Directory of Toronto. Bernard Luk wrote that some agencies may not have advertised, so the directory was "not exhaustive". In Toronto ethnic Chinese who immigrated from Vietnam formed community organizations separate from those of the Kinh people.

=== Individual organizations ===
The Chinese Benevolent Association (CBA) mediated between the Chinese community and the Toronto city government and within the Chinese community, and it stated that it represented the entire Chinese community. The CBA, which had its headquarters at the intersection of Elizabeth Street and Hagerman Street, was originally created in regards to Chinese political developments during the late Qing dynasty. In much of its history it was allied to the Kuomintang.

The Chinese Canadian National Council (CCNC) is a Chinese Canadian rights organization that, as of 1991, had 29 affiliates and chapters throughout Canada. It was formed in 1979.

As of 1991 the Chinese Cultural Centre of Greater Toronto (CCC) had 130 members and organizes cultural activities such as dragon boat races, musical concerts, and ping pong tournaments. The steering committee of the CCC was established in the summer of 1988.

The Hong Kong-Canada Business Association (HKCBA) is a pro-Hong Kong-Canada trade, investment, and bilateral contact organization. Its Toronto section, as of 1991, had about 600 members and it had more than 2,900 members in ten other Canadian cities. The organization published a newsletter, The Hong Kong Monitor, distributed throughout Canada. Each section also had its own bulletin. The HKCBA was established in 1984.

The Si Ho Tong was one of the family name-based mutual aid organizations active in the 1930s.

The Toronto Association for Democracy in China (TADC) is a 1989 movement organization and human rights organization. In 1991 it had 200 members. It was established on May 20, 1989, as the Toronto Committee of Concerned Chinese Canadians Supporting the Democracy Movement in China, and in April 1990 was incorporated in Ontario as a nonprofit organization.

The Toronto Chinese Business Association, which represents ethnic Chinese businesspersons in the Toronto area, had about 1,100 members in 1991. It was founded in 1972. This organization is a sister association of the Ontario Chinese Restaurant Association.

== Politics ==
The Chinese Benevolent Association gained power after several factions competed for political dominance in the 1920s: the political consolidation was completed by the 1930s. Many clan organizations and family name organizations, or tong, formed political backbone of the Chinese community in the 1930s and 1940s. The Toronto political establishment referred to a "Mayor of Chinatown," an informal office that served as a liaison between the city's power structure and the Chinese hierarchy. The Chinese persons communicating with the white community were at the top of the ethnic Chinese social and political hierarchy and made themselves as the representatives of the entire Chinese community. The tong and hui geographical and surname groups were under the political control of the CBA, and dues paid to these umbrella organizations rose to the top of the CBA leadership.

The end of the Chinese Civil War in 1949 and the Chinese Communist Party rule in the mainland caused political fissures in the Chinese community. Organizations which were pro-CCP left the CBA-oriented power structure. The CBA lost its political dominance by the 1960s.

== Commerce ==
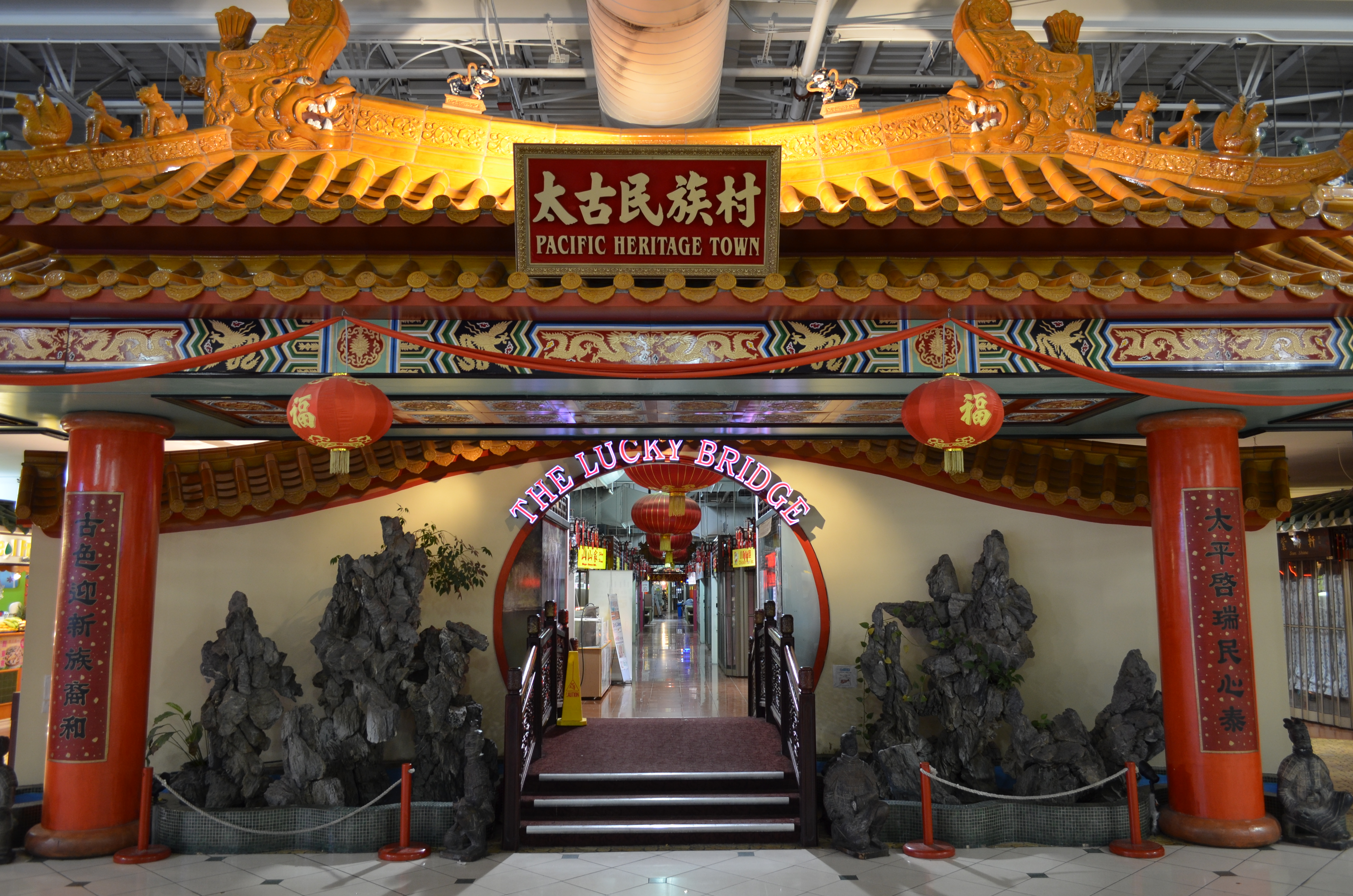
Pacific Heritage town of the Pacific Mall

As of 2000 there are several businesses that provide services tailored to Chinese customers, including banks, restaurants, shopping malls, and supermarkets and grocery stores. Most of them offered services in Cantonese while some also had services in Mandarin.

The Dundas and Spadina intersection in Toronto was where Chinese ethnic commercial activity occurred during the 1980s. Broadview and Gerrard later became the primary point of ethnic Chinese commercial activity. Ethnic Chinese commercial activity in the Toronto districts of North York and Scarborough became prominent in the 1990s. In the late 1990s the suburbs of Markham and Richmond Hill in the York Region gained ethnic Chinese commerce.

In Toronto Chinese commercial activity took place in commercial strips dedicated to the ethnic Chinese. Once the commercial activity began moving into suburban municipalities, indoor malls were constructed to house Chinese commercial activity. These malls also functioned as community centres for Chinese people living in suburban areas. Many such malls were established in Agincourt and Willowdale in Metropolitan Toronto, and in Markham and Richmond Hill. The Pacific Mall in Markham opened in 1997. In 2012 Dakshana Bascaramurty of The Globe and Mail wrote that the popularity of ethnic shopping centres declined and that many ethnic Chinese are preferring to go to mainstream retailers.

=== Restaurants ===
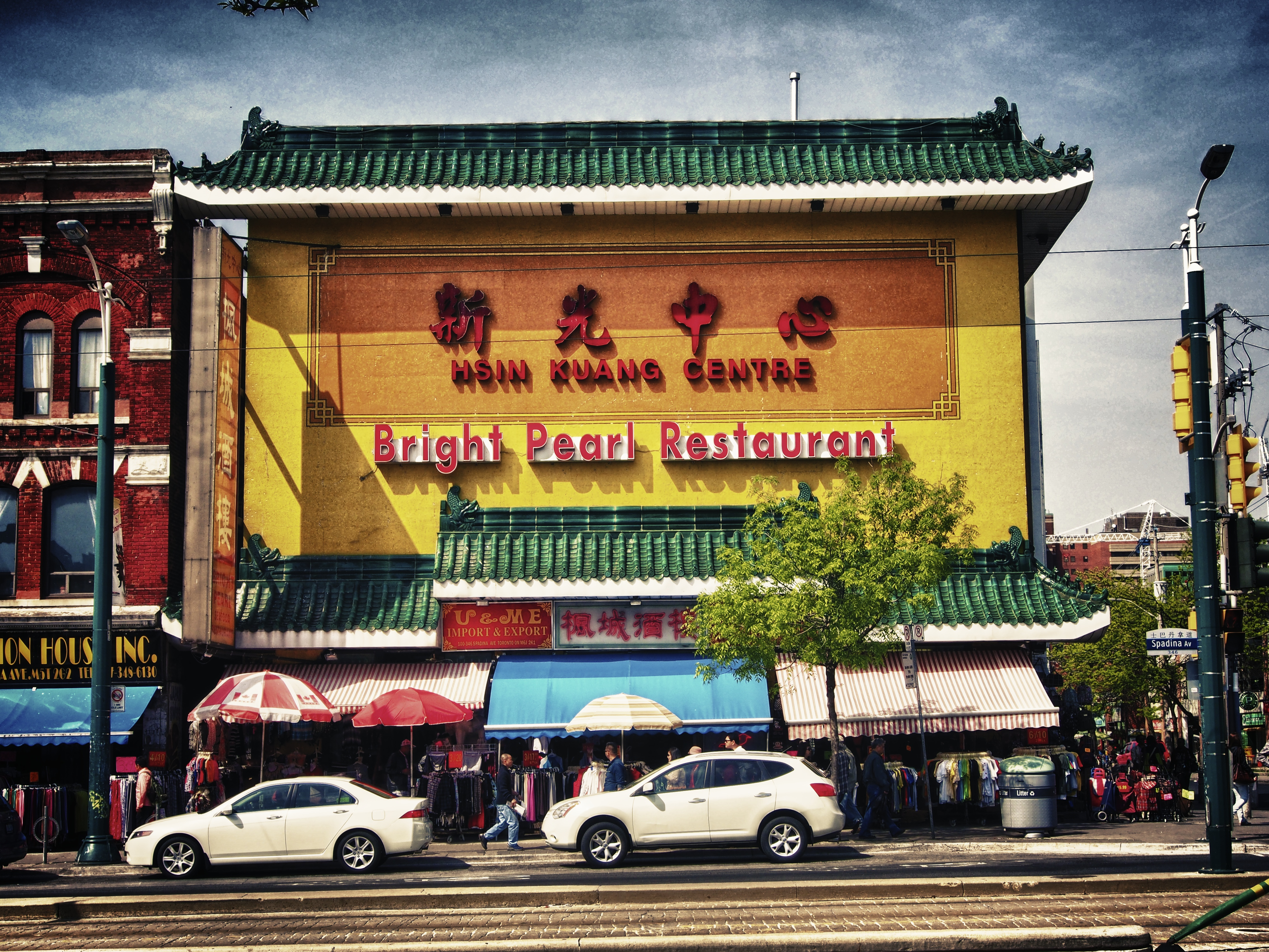
Bright Pearl Restaurant in the Hsin Kuang Centre (新光中心, P: Xīnguāng Zhōngxīn) in Toronto

As of 2000 most Chinese restaurants in the Toronto area serve Yue cuisine and it had been that way historically. Other styles of cuisine available include Beijing, Chaozhou (Chiu Chow), Shanghai, Sichuan, and "Nouvelle Cantonese." Shanghai-style restaurants in the Toronto area include Shanghai-style ones opened by those who directly immigrated from Shanghai to Toronto, as well as Hong Kong and Taiwan-style Shanghai restaurants opened by people who originated from Shanghai and went to Hong Kong and/or Taiwan around 1949 before moving to Toronto later in their lives. There are also "Hong Kong western food" restaurants in the Toronto area, and in general many of the restaurants, as of 2000, cater to persons who originated from Hong Kong. The Toronto Chinese Restaurant Association (Chinese: 多倫多華商餐館同業會; pinyin: Duōlúnduō Huáshāng Cānguǎn Tóngyè Huì) serves the metropolitan area's Chinese restaurants.

Early Chinese settlers in Toronto established restaurants because there was not very much capital needed to establish them. Many of the earliest Chinese-operated restaurants in Toronto were inexpensive and catered to native-born Canadians; they included hamburger restaurants and cafes, and they were predominantly small in size. There were 32 Chinese-operated restaurants in Toronto in 1918, and this increased to 202 by 1923. Many of these restaurants began serving Canadian Chinese cuisine, including chop suey and chow mein, and the number of Canadian Chinese restaurants increased as the food became more and more popular among the Canadian public. The first association of Chinese-operated, Western-style restaurant owners association in Toronto was established in 1923. By the late 1950s larger, fancier restaurants had opened in the Chinatown in Toronto, and several of them catered to non-Chinese. Fatima Lee, the author of "Food as an Ethnic Marker: Chinese Restaurant Food in Toronto," wrote that after large numbers of educated, skilled Chinese arrived in the post-1967 period, the quality of food at Toronto's Chinese restaurants "markedly improved". The first Hong Kong-style restaurant to open in the city was "International Chinese Restaurant" (Chinese: 國際大酒樓; pinyin: Guójì Dà Jiǔlóu; Jyutping: gwok3 zai3 daai6 zau2 lau4) on Dundas Street.

In 1989 the Chinese Business Telephone Directories listed 614 Chinese restaurants in the Toronto area. The 1991 directory listed 785 restaurants. Fatima Lee wrote that the actual number of restaurants may be larger because the directory listing is "by no means exhaustive". During the late 20th century, the influx of people previously resident in Hong Kong, many of whom were originally transplants from mainland China, caused an increase in variety of Chinese cuisine available in Toronto. Some Toronto Chinese restaurants cater to Jews by offering Kosher-friendly menus.

By 2000 some Indian restaurants operated by ethnic Chinese persons opened in Toronto.

== Media ==
=== Newspapers ===
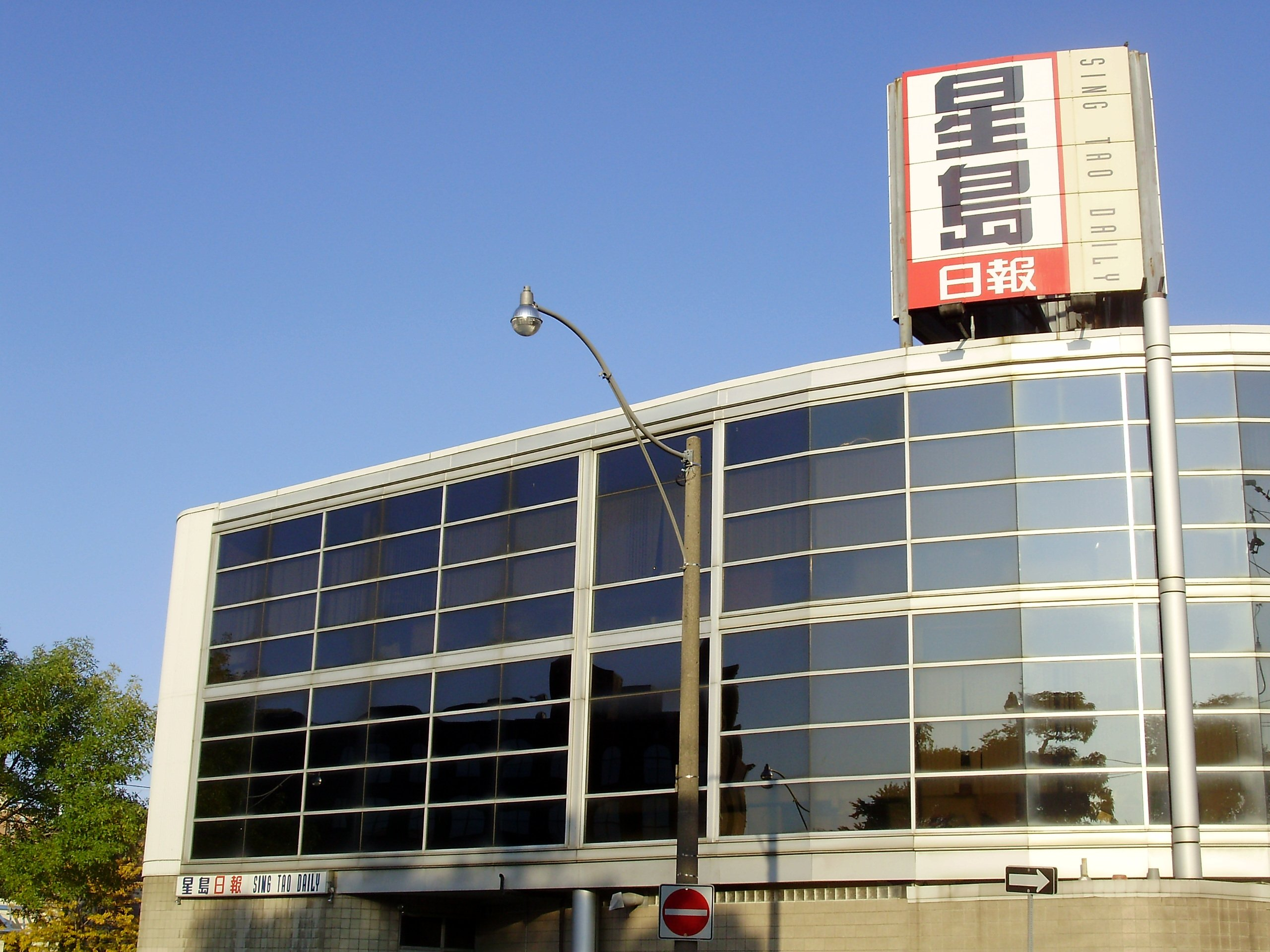
Sing Tao offices in Toronto

The Sing Wah Daily (醒華日報, P: Xǐng Huá Rìbào) began publication in 1922. Prior to 1967, it was the sole major Chinese newspaper in Toronto. Eight pages were in each published edition of the Sing Wah Daily.

New major newspapers were established post-1967 as the Chinese community expanded.

The Chinese Express (快報, P: Kuàibào), a daily newspaper, was published in Toronto.

The Modern Times Weekly (時代周報, P: Shídài Zhōubào), a Chinese newspaper with English summaries, was published in Toronto.

As of 2000 there are three major Chinese-language newspapers published in the Toronto area giving news related to Greater China, Canada, and the world; they have issues with 80 pages each. The World Journal, written in Taiwan-style Traditional Chinese and read by people from Taiwan and northern parts of mainland China. The last issue was published on December 31, 2015. The Ming Pao Daily News (division of Ming Pao) and Sing Tao Daily, both written in Hong Kong-style Traditional Chinese and read by people from Hong Kong and southern parts of mainland China. In 2000, the circulation of these newspapers was 80,000.

People from mainland China also read the People's Daily and the Yangcheng Daily, two newspapers written in mainland-style Simplified Chinese. According to the 1997 Chinese Consumer Directory of Toronto there were 18 newspapers and publishers.

=== Broadcast media ===
Fairchild TV has Cantonese cable programs available. OMNI Television has weekday evening news available in Cantonese. In the mid-1990s this broadcast was 30 minutes long, which had increased to one hour in 2000. There are also weekend movies. Mandarin news was added after the year 2000.

In 2019, there are two major Chinese radio stations in Toronto: A1 Chinese Radio and Fairchild Radio (CHKT and CIRV-FM). In 2000, the Toronto area has one full-time Chinese radio station and four part-time Chinese radio stations. In 1997, there were nine television and broadcasting businesses in Toronto, according to the Chinese Consumer Directory.

==== Miss Chinese Toronto Pageant ====
Since 1999, the Miss Chinese Toronto Pageant, also known as MCT or MCTP for short, is an annual beauty pageant organized by Fairchild TV that selects Toronto's representative for the annual Miss Chinese International Pageant that is held in Hong Kong, organized by TVB. The Winner can then sign with Fairchild TV as a presenter, or often other popular contestants sign with Fairchild TV, even without a title.

Formerly known as the Greater Toronto Chinese Pageant, both the pre-renamed and renamed Toronto pageants are unrelated to the Miss Chinese Scarborough Pageant, a discontinued pageant of the same region.

===== Overview =====
Contestants must be of at least partial Chinese descent and have resided in Canada for continuous period of 6 months or a total of one year on the day the application form is signed. The age requirement is 17–27 (expanded in 2011). The contestants must have never been married or pregnant or committed a crime.

The master of ceremonies of the pageant are Dominic Lam (1995–2012) and Leo Shiu (2013–present)

===== MCT at Miss Chinese International Pageant =====
- Toronto participated at Miss Chinese International every year, except in 1989, 1994, and 1995. The representatives that participated before 1996 were all winners of the Greater Toronto Chinese Pageant.

Year represented at MCI	Delegate number & name	Age^{1}	Placement (if any)	Special awards won (if any)	Notes
2019	18. Summer Yang 楊昳譞	26			
2018	15. Tiffany Choi 蔡菀庭	23	Top 5 Finalist		TVB Actress
2017	15. Gloria Li 李珮儀	24	Top 10	Miss Finesse (Best Talent Performance Award)	
2016	13. Sissi Ke 柯思懿	23			
2015	16. Valerie Fong 方詩揚	26	Top 10		
2014	15. Mandy Liang 梁淼	26	Top 10		
2013	15. Jessica Song 宋沁禕	23	Top 5 Finalist	Star of Tomorrow Award	
2012	17. Ashton Hong 洪美珊	19		Miss Friendship	Because Miss Chinese International Pageant was not held in 2011, both 2010 and 2011 MCT winners were invited to compete in the 2012 pageant.
2012	16.Hilary Tam 譚曉榆	24			Because Miss Chinese International Pageant was not held in 2011, both 2010 and 2011 MCT winners were invited to compete in the 2012 pageant.
2010	18. Candy Chang 張慧雯	20	2nd runner up		TVB Actress
2009	24. Christine Kuo 苟芸慧	25	Winner	International Charm Ambassador	TVB Actress
2008	18. Liang Wang 王靚	18			
2007	4. Sherry Chen 陳爽	23	2nd runner up		TVB Actress, Hong Kong Model
2006	12. Elva Ni 倪晨曦	18	Top 5 Finalist		Hong Kong Model, Ni's sister competed in Miss Chinese Toronto 2007 and received the Charming Communicator Award.
2005	12. Lena Ma 馬艶冰	17			Later Miss World Canada 2009, 4th runner up at Miss World 2009. Model
2004	16. Sarina Lee 李翹欣	20			
2003	10. Diana Wu 吳丹	18	2nd runner up		
2002	5. Christie Bartram 白穎茵	18	1st runner up	Miss Svelte Beauty	Competed in Miss Universe Canada 2003. Did not make the top 10.
2001	5. Cissy Wang 汪詩詩	19			Wife of actor Donnie Yen
2000	12. Ava Chan 陳仙仙	19			Chan was 1st runner up at Miss Chinese Toronto 1999, but was selected to compete in MCI.
1999	8. Audrey Li 李酈		Top 5 Finalist		
1998	8. Julia Fong 房翠麗				
1997	5. Monica Lo 盧淑儀	18	Winner		Actress
1996	5. Patsy Poon 潘美詩		Top 10 Semifinalist		
1993	20. Wong Man Ching 王文靜				
1992	8. Rosemary Chan 陳曼莉	23	Winner	Media's Favorite Award, Miss Oriental Charm	
1991	3. Jenny Hon 韓宗妮	22			
1988	1. Yuen Mei Mak 麥宛美	20			

^{1} Age at the time of the Miss Chinese International pageant

=== Other media ===
Other print media serving the Toronto Chinese community include community group publications, magazines, and newsletters. According to the 1997 Chinese Consumer Directory there were 59 bookstores, 57 printers, 27 karaoke and videotape rental businesses, 13 typesetting businesses, 10 LaserDisc rental businesses, and two Chinese theatres and cinemas. As of 2000 90% of the Chinese-oriented electronic media in Toronto used Cantonese.

== Religion ==
As of 1999, there are over 23 Buddhist temples and associations in the GTA established by the Chinese. Toronto-area Buddhist and Taoist organizations were established by different subgroups, including Hongkongers, Southeast Asians, and Taiwanese. The Vietnamese Buddhist Temple has worshipers from Chinese Vietnamese and Kinh origins.

=== Christianity ===
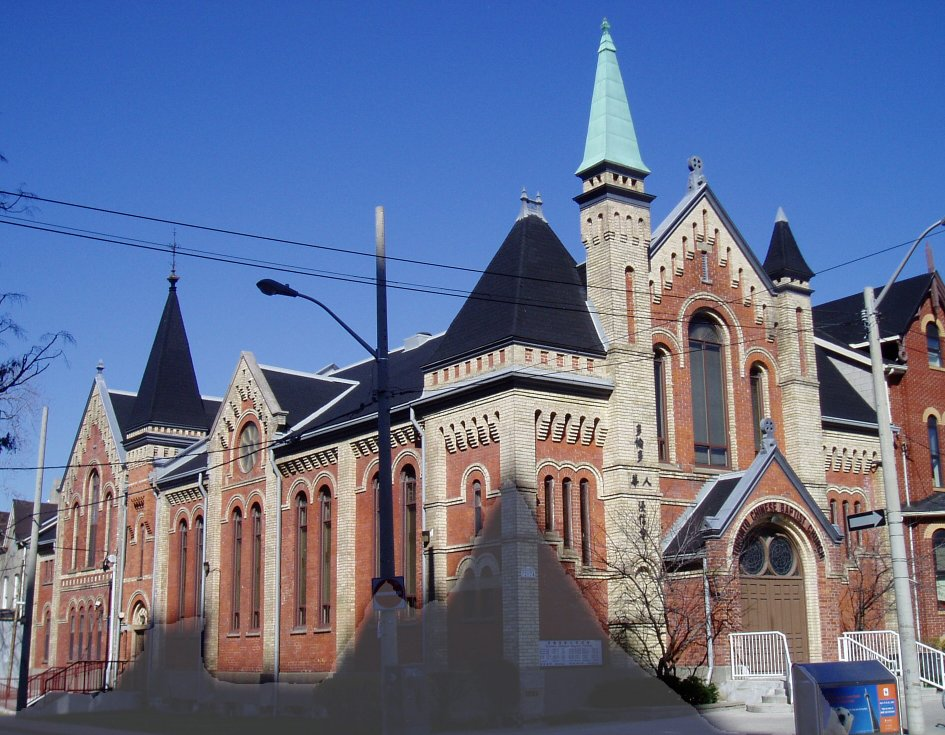
Toronto Chinese Baptist Church

As of 1994 the Toronto area had 97 Chinese Protestant churches and three Chinese Catholic churches. That year most Protestant denominations each had two to five Chinese churches, while the Baptists had 25 and the Methodists had 11. As of 1994 year the Metropolitan Toronto communities of Scarborough and Willowdale, as well as Markham and Thornhill, had concentrations of Chinese churches. As of 2000 most Chinese churches in the Toronto area hold services in Cantonese, and there are some churches that hold services in Mandarin and Taiwanese Min Nan.

The Young Men's Christian Association established a Chinese mission in Toronto in the 1800s, and Cooke's Presbyterian Church opened its own Chinese mission in 1894 in conjunction with the Christian Endeavour Society. The Presbyterian church became associated with 25 Chinese, about half of the total population in Toronto at the time. The first part-time missionary to work with Chinese people was Thomas Humphreys, who began his work in 1902, and the first full-time Chinese Christian missionary in the city was Ng Mon Hing, who moved from Vancouver to Toronto in 1908. In 1909 the Chinese Christian Association was established. Reverend T. K. Wo Ma, the first Chinese Presbyterian Minister in the province of Ontario, and his wife Anna Ma jointly set up Toronto's first Chinese Presbyterian Church in a three-storey house at 187 Church Street. The church included a Chinese school and living quarters and 20–30 men made up its initial congregation.

Especially prior to the 1950s missionaries of mainstream Canadian churches established many of the Chinese Protestant churches. Ethnic Chinese immigrant ministers, missionaries originating from Hong Kong, and in some cases missionary departments of Hong Kong-based churches created additional Chinese Protestant congregations. In 1967 the first Chinese Catholic church opened in a former synagogue on Cecil Street in the Dundas-Spadina Chinatown, and the church moved to a former Portuguese mission in 1970. In October 1987 the second Catholic church in the Toronto area, located in Scarborough, opened. The Archdiocese of Toronto gave permission for the opening of the area's third Chinese church in Richmond Hill in 1992. In the 1990s many Chinese Protestant churches intentionally moved to suburban areas where new ethnic Chinese enclaves had formed.

== Recreation ==
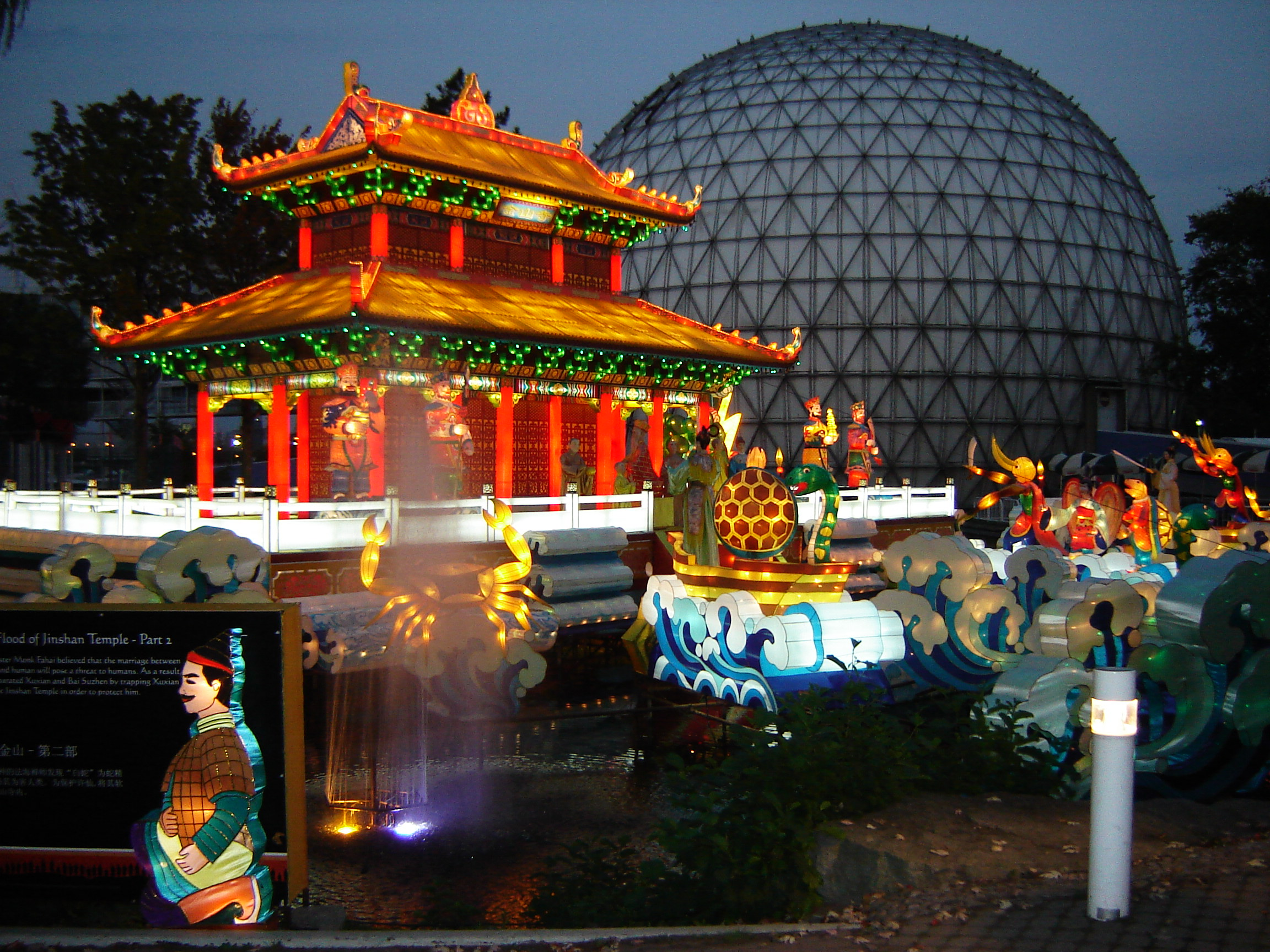
Toronto Chinese Lantern Festival

The Chinese New Year is celebrated in Toronto. As of 2015 Canada's largest Chinese New Year event is the "Dragon Ball," held at the Beanfield Centre. Celebrations occur in the Toronto Chinatown, and the Chinese Cultural Centre of Greater Toronto holds its annual banquet at that time. As of 2015 other celebrations occur in the Toronto Public Library system, at the Toronto Zoo, during the Chinese New Year Carnival China, and in the Markham Civic Centre and Market Village in Markham. Ethnic Chinese employees of the Mississauga-based Maple Leaf Foods developed Chinese-oriented sausages for sale during the Chinese New Year.

The Toronto Chinese Lantern Festival is held in the city.

As of 2000 there were Chinese music clubs in Toronto which put on public singing and opera performances.

As of the 1950s most of the Chinese-language films consumed in Toronto's Chinese community originated from Hong Kong and Taiwan.

In 1988, the Toronto Chinese Business Association introduced Dragonboat Festival Racing at Centre Island. Vancouver previously introduced the Hong Kong style teak wooden boat races to North America at Expo 86. TCBA representatives attended the 1987 Vancouver festival in order to learn about the event.

== Notable residents ==
Also see list of Chinese Canadians

Politics and public service

- Arnold Chan (陳家諾), late MP for Scarborough—Agincourt, Liberal
- Michael Chan (陳國治), former Ontario Cabinet Minister, MPP for Markham—Unionville, Liberal
- Shaun Chen (陈圣源), MP for Scarborough North, Liberal
- Gordon Chong (张金仪), former city councillor and former vice-chairman of the Toronto Transit Commission
- Olivia Chow (鄒至蕙), Mayor of Toronto, MP for Trinity—Spadina from 2006 to 2014, New Democrat
- Adrienne Clarkson (伍冰枝), Governor General of Canada from 1999 to 2005, former journalist, novelist, publisher, winner of the Gemini Award: Best Host in a Light Information Programme
- Han Dong (董晗鵬), MP for Don Valley North, Liberal
- Ying Hope (刘光英), former Metro Toronto Councillor
- Chungsen Leung (梁中心), MP for Willowdale and Parliamentary Secretary for Multiculturalism, Conservative
- Jean Lumb, community activist and first Chinese-Canadian to receive the Order of Canada
- Denzil Minnan-Wong (黄旻南), first Chinese Deputy Mayor, Toronto
- Mary Ng (伍鳳儀), federal Minister of Small Business and Export Promotion and MP for Markham—Thornhill, Liberal
- Victor Oh, Canadian senator from Ontario born in Singapore but of Chinese descent, Conservative
- Vivienne Poy (利德蕙), first senator of Chinese ancestry, sister-in-law to Adrienne Clarkson, Liberal
- Geng Tan (谭耕), former MP for Don Valley North, Liberal
- Bob Wong (黃景培), former Ontario Cabinet Minister and MPP for Fort York, Liberal
- Soo Wong (黃素梅), Ontario MPP for Scarborough—Agincourt, Liberal
- Tony C. Wong (黃志華), former Ontario MPP for Markham, former York Region Councillor, Liberal
- Kristyn Wong-Tam (黃慧文), LGBTQ activist and Toronto councillor for the Rosedale electoral district
- Jean Yip (葉嘉麗), MP for Scarborough—Agincourt, Liberal

Law and judiciary

- Susan Eng (伍素屏), former chair of the Metro Toronto Police Services Board
- Avvy Go (吳瑤瑤), prominent social justice lawyer and member of the Order of Ontario

Business

- G. Raymond Chang, co-founder and former CEO of CI Financial, philanthropist and third Chancellor of Ryerson University
- Ben Chiu (邱澤堃), founder of KillerApp.com
- Sunny Fong, fashion designer
- Kwok Yuen Ho (何国源), co-founder and former CEO of ATI Technologies
- Andrea Jung (鍾彬嫻), CEO of Avon Products
- Susur Lee, chef and international restaurateur based in Toronto
- Michael Lee-Chin, investor; CEO of AIC Canada
- Dan Liu, fashion designer
- Adrienne Wu, fashion designer

Other

- Jennifer Pan – Criminal, of Viet Hoa (ethnic Chinese in Vietnam) ancestry
