= Miss Chinese Vancouver Pageant =

Annual beauty pageant for Chinese Canadians

- 溫哥華華裔小姐競選
- Abbreviation: MCV, 溫哥華小姐
- Formation: 1995; 31 years ago
- Type: Beauty pageant
- Purpose: Annual beauty pageant to crown the best representative of Chinese Canadians in Vancouver beauty
- Location(s): River Rock Casino Resort, Richmond, British Columbia (2009, 2022-present); Vancouver Convention Centre, Vancouver, British Columbia, Canada (1995-2008, 2010-2019); Virtual (2020); Vancouver Playhouse, Vancouver, British Columbia (2021)
- Members: Miss Chinese International (1995–present)
- Official language: Cantonese, Mandarin, English
- Current title holder: Sophia Yin 殷千葉 (2025)
- Parent organization: Fairchild TV
- Website: mcvp2026.fairchildtv.com/ch/home.php

Miss Chinese Vancouver Pageant (Chinese: 溫哥華華裔小姐競選), also known as MCV and formerly branded as Miss Chinese (Vancouver) Pageant, is an annual beauty pageant organized by Fairchild TV that selects Vancouver's representative for the annual Miss Chinese International Pageant that is held in Hong Kong, organized by TVB. The current Miss Chinese Vancouver is Sophia Yin (殷千葉) winner of the 2025 pageant.

The pageant replaced the Miss Vancouver Chinatown Pageant, which selected Vancouver's representatives to the Miss Chinese International Pageant from 1988 to 1995. It is one of the most recognized beauty pageants among Chinese Canadian diaspora, alongside its Toronto counterpart. In 2020, the Miss Chinese (Vancouver) Pageant was rebranded as the Miss Chinese Vancouver Pageant.

== History ==
The pageant began in 1995. Contestants must be of at least partial Chinese descent and have resided in Canada for continuous period of 6 months on the day the application form is signed. The age requirement is 17-27 (expanded in 2011). The contestants must have never been married or pregnant or committed a crime. The pageant is held at the River Rock Casino Resort in December of every year since 2022. Previously the pageant was held at the Vancouver Convention Centre from 1995 to 2019. In 2009, the location was moved to the River Rock Casino Resort in Richmond, British Columbia due to the media currently taking place at the Vancouver Convention Centre for the Vancouver 2010 Winter Games.

== Masters of ceremonies ==
- 1995: Lawrence Cheng 鄭丹瑞, Deborah Moore 狄寶娜摩亞
- 1996: Lawrence Cheng 鄭丹瑞, Dominic Lam 林嘉華
- 1997: Lawrence Cheng 鄭丹瑞, Dominic Lam 林嘉華
- 1998: Dominic Lam 林嘉華
- 1999: Dominic Lam 林嘉華, Eva Yang 楊宜文, Walter Ngai 倪啟瑞
- 2000: Dominic Lam 林嘉華, Sam Wong 黃植森, Eric Li 李潤庭
- 2001: Dominic Lam 林嘉華, Walter Ngai 倪啟瑞, Crystal Pan 潘欣欣, Natalie Au 區念慈, Delon Lew 廖德隆
- 2002: Dominic Lam 林嘉華, Eva Yang 楊宜文, Crystal Pan 潘欣欣
- 2003: Dominic Lam 林嘉華, Eva Yang 楊宜文, Annabelle Louie 雷安娜
- 2004: Dominic Lam 林嘉華, Eva Yang 楊宜文, Anita Lee 李婉華
- 2005: Stephen Au 區錦棠, Eva Yang 楊宜文, Anita Lee 李婉華, Ricky Cheung 張文謙
- 2006: Joey Leung 梁榮忠, Anita Lee 李婉華, Ricky Cheung 張文謙
- 2007: Amigo Choi 崔建邦, Anita Lee 李婉華, Ricky Cheung 張文謙
- 2008: Dominic Lam 林嘉華, Gregory Charles Rivers 河國榮, Brian Chan 陳本岡, Tsui Li Hsin 崔麗心
- 2009: Stephen Huynh 黃長興, Lora Sun 孫青青, Brian Chan 陳本岡
- 2010: Patrick Tang 鄧健泓, Brian Chan 陳本岡, Gerald Yang 楊飛
- 2011: Jason Chan 陳智燊, Tsui Li Hsin 崔麗心, Brian Chan 陳本岡
- 2012: Sunny Chan 陳錦鴻, Mandy Jin 金夢宜, Ricky Cheung 張文謙
- 2013: Anna Yau 丘凱敏, Ricky Cheung 張文謙, Fred Liu 劉津
- 2014: William Hu 胡渭康, Ricky Cheung 張文謙, Fred Liu 劉津
- 2015: Anne Heung 向海嵐, Fred Liu 劉津
- 2016: Vinci Wong 王賢誌, Fred Liu 劉津
- 2017: Fred Liu 劉津, Delon Lew 廖德隆
- 2018: Fred Liu 劉津, BChiu 趙穎䝼, Jack Wu 胡諾言
- 2019: BChiu 趙穎䝼, Delon Lew 廖德隆, Tingting Niu 牛婷婷
- 2020: BChiu 趙穎䝼, Chris Yuen 袁號殷
- 2021: BChiu 趙穎䝼, Chris Yuen 袁號殷, Fred Liu 劉津
- 2022: Fred Liu 劉津, BChiu 趙穎䝼
- 2023: Fred Liu 劉津, BChiu 趙穎䝼
- 2024: BChiu 趙穎䝼, Jerry Liu 劉肇瑋
- 2025: Fred Liu 劉津, BChiu 趙穎䝼
- 2026: Fred Liu 劉津,BChiu 趙穎䝼

== Special performing guests ==
- 1995: Sandra Lang 仙杜拉
- 1996: Angus Tung 童安格
- 1997: Info Not Available
- 1998: Info Not Available
- 1999: Jade Kwan 關惠文, Ya-Wen Wang 王亞文
- 2000: Teresa Carpio 杜麗莎
- 2001: Public Dreams Society, Benny Yau 邱穟恆, Cindy Cheung 張瑋恩, Rebecca Yang 楊詠薇, Jenny Chang 張聖伶, Abraham Siu 蕭正中, Patrick Huang 黃紹廷
- 2002: Public Dreams Society, Rita Leung 梁璟裕, Kitty Bao 鮑芳, Gerald Kwok 郭嘉豪
- 2003: Public Dreams Society, Gerald Kwok 郭嘉豪, Bella Chen 陳薇
- 2004: Ah Niu (Tan Kheng Seong) 阿牛(陳慶祥)
- 2005: Ekin Cheng 鄭伊健
- 2006: Anthony Lun 倫永亮
- 2007: Jeremy Chang 張洪量, Benny Yau 邱穟恆, Derek Chiu 趙子恆, Phil Lam 林漢輝, Luciano Goncalves, Eric Chen 陳冠勳, Jessica Cheung 張葆頤, Jessica Chow 周美蘭, Peggy Mao 毛立慈, Ginny Huang 黃瀞儀
- 2008: Remus Choy 蔡一傑, Bernice Liu 廖碧兒, Lini Evans 伊雲絲, Derek Chiu 趙子恆, Dionne Phillips 余迪安, Laura Tang 湯有麗, Micky Tang 鄧佑剛, Gary Yan 甄嘉亮
- 2009: Steven Ma 馬浚偉, Richard Yuen 袁卓凡
- 2010: Wong He 王喜
- 2011: Ruco Chan 陳展鵬
- 2012: Hanjin Tan 陳奐仁
- 2013: Justin Lo 側田
- 2014: Alfred Hui 許廷鏗
- 2015: Alex Hung 洪杰
- 2016: Mak Cheung Ching 麥長青
- 2017: Joel Chan 陳山聰
- 2018: Lok-yi Lai 黎諾懿
- 2019: Matthew Ho 何廣沛
- 2020: Pakho Chau 周柏豪 (virtual due to COVID-19 pandemic)
- 2021: Richard Yuen and Friends
- 2022: Sukie Shek 石詠莉
- 2023: James Ng 吳業坤
- 2024: Phil Lam 林奕匡
- 2025: FC Tam 譚輝智
- 2026: Ramon Lo 羅啟豪

== Past pageant results ==
=== Major award winners ===
Year	Winner 冠軍	1st Runner-Up 亞軍	2nd Runner-Up 季軍	Miss Photogenic 最上鏡小姐	Miss Friendship 友誼小姐 (1995-2016)
1995	1. Tracey Wong 黃月明	9. Angela Cheng 鄭期慧	7. Michele Lee 李美芬	1. Tracey Wong 黃月明	no award given
1996	10. Nancy Chong 莊慧芬	12. Melissa Chiu 趙秀娟	6. Joanne Yau 邱詩韻	10. Nancy Chong 莊慧芬	2. Yolanda Szeto 司徒幼蘭
1997	10. Dina Goh 戈婷	12. Jeanne Chen 陳靜	4. Serena Kwan 關翠萍	10. Dina Goh 戈婷	6. Danielle Tsui 徐丹璇
1998	1. Janice Lee 李孟潔	6. Natalie Au 區念慈	3. Niki Liapis 李麗淇	1. Janice Lee 李孟潔	6. Natalie Au 區念慈
1999	7. Crystal Pan 潘欣欣	4. Alice Sun 孫睦雅	8. Francisca Ngan 顏孔儀	7. Crystal Pan 潘欣欣	11. Anita Lee 李家頴
2000	10. Bernice Liu 廖碧兒	9. Loretta Hsiao 蕭惠茵	8. Alice Chang 張淯茜	10. Bernice Liu 廖碧兒	5. Kimberley Chan 陳姗妮
2001	9. Shirley Zhou 周雪	8. Teresa Tsuei 崔澤韻	1. Leanne Lindgren 凌美美	9. Shirley Zhou 周雪	1. Leanne Lindgren 凌美美
2002	2. Annie Wang 王燁希	6. Alice Kai 蓋鶴文	3. Sabrina Vi 韋佩詩	2. Annie Wang 王燁希	6. Alice Kai 蓋鶴文
2003	7. Linda Chung 鍾嘉欣	8. Dorothy Chan 陳思雅	1. Queenie Chung 鍾寶瑜	7. Linda Chung 鍾嘉欣	10. Caroline Chang 張雅淇
2004	10. Leanne Li 李亞男	7. Pearl Hsu 徐珮郁	8. Angela Quon 關婉婷	10. Leanne Li 李亞男	4. Elisa Leung 梁伊莎
2005	10. Crystal Li 李培禎	1. Lora Sun 孫青青	2. Fiti Liu 劉佳	1. Lora Sun 孫青青	6. Susan Wong 黃潔華
2006	10. Susana Su 蘇小蕊	4. Teresa Chang 張庭昀	6. Carrie Wang 王藝瞳	10. Susana Su 蘇小蕊	2. Fiona Liu 劉凱函
2007	8. Jessica Choi 蔡凱欣	9. Jessie Huang 黃悅	2. Kitty Li 李俍燕	8. Jessica Choi 蔡凱欣	4. Annie Zheng 鄭國
2008	9. Cici Chen 陳娜良子	3. Shu Yi Lu 陸舒怡	8. Jiana Ling 凌嘉娜	3. Shu Yi Lu 陸舒怡	9. Cici Chen 陳娜良子
2009	7. Eliza Sam 岑麗香	8. Carat Cheung 張名雅	10. Pacifica Chen 陳采風	7. Eliza Sam 岑麗香	3. Jessica Yeung 楊慧冰
2010	7. Susan Su 蘇慧文	5. Jenny Leung 梁靜怡	3. Jessie Li 李穆知^{[a]}	7. Susan Su 蘇慧文	no award given
2011	5. Erica Chui 徐穎堃	9. Vicky Chan 陳偉琪	1. Allyssa Sy 施穎瑜	9. Vicky Chan 陳偉琪	no award given
2012	7. Gloria Tang 鄧佩儀	3. Veronica Shiu 邵珮詩	9. Christina Wang 王蘊	2. Linna Huynh 黃碧蓮	no award given
2013	5. Cindy Zhong 鍾熠	8. Jennifer Lee 李佳美	1. Jamie Gao 高嘉馨	5. Cindy Zhong 鍾熠	5. Cindy Zhong 鍾熠
2014	3. Erica Chen 陳怡靜	9. Maggie Wu 吳嘉瑤	1. Jessica Hsu 許君儀	3. Erica Chen 陳怡靜	9. Maggie Wu 吳嘉瑤
2015	6. Jennifer Coosemans 朱亞琳	2. Lettitia Lai 黎樂怡	9. Karen Ku 顧紫菱	3. Cathy Tse 謝家朗	2. Lettitia Lai 黎樂怡
2016	4. Maria Rincon 王思思	1. Prenda Wang 王譯斐	7. Sherry Xue 薛茹心	1. Prenda Wang 王譯斐	Discontinued
2017	8. Cheryl Ng 伍殷嬅	9. Ruby Ng 伍沛盈	1.Tingting Niu 牛婷婷	9. Ruby Ng 伍沛盈	Discontinued
2018	2. Alice Lin 林昀佳	1. May Li 李天懿	7. Rachel He 赫英彤	2. Alice Lin 林昀佳	Discontinued
2019	9. Jennifer Packet 宋珍妮	1. Winnie Zheng 鄭嘉恩	5. Danni Jia 賈丹妮	2. Candice Zhang 張為依	Discontinued
2020	7. Amy Tso 曹榕容	8. Julianne Nieh 聶均竹	1. Vicky Wu 吳曉鈴	7. Amy Tso 曹榕容	Discontinued
2021	4. Cindy Wu 吳昕宸	3. Yasmine Ross 張敏鈞	7. Grace Wu 吳育廷	3. Yasmine Ross 張敏鈞	Discontinued
2022	7. Yi Yi Wang 王一亦	5. Renee Jan 詹惟淳	8. Nicole Tanner 陳劻晴	5. Renee Jan 詹惟淳	Discontinued
2023	5. Isabella Zhai 翟悅迪	1. Tracy Chung 鍾翠詩	6. Annie Zhang 張安妮	1. Tracy Chung 鍾翠詩	Discontinued
2024	1. Shania Fu 符冬鈺	4. Marina Yu 鬱嘉寧	5. Olivia Zou 鄒菡竹	4. Marina Yu 鬱嘉寧	Discontinued
2025	3. Sophia Yin 殷千葉	8. Tiffany Chan 陳恬兒	2. Joanna Fu 傅佳愛	5. Charlene Bi 畢淺兒	Discontinued
2026					Discontinued
2027					Discontinued

- a ''Originally, the Second Runner-Up of 2010 was Linda Wang 王冠. However, she relinquished the title in May 2011 for personal reasons and 4th place Jessie Li was awarded the title.

=== Other award winners ===
Year	Delegate number and name	Award title
1995	1. Tracey Wong 黃月明	Best Posture Award 完美體態獎
1995	9. Angela Cheng 鄭期慧	Miss Classical Beauty 最具古典美小姐
1995	11. Eleanor Ma 馬小儀	Miss Vitality 活力小姐
1996	12. Melissa Chiu 趙秀娟	Miss Audience Popularity 最受觀眾歡迎獎
1997	10. Dina Goh 戈婷	Miss Audience Popularity 最受觀眾歡迎獎
1999	Mandy Wong 黃世茹	Miss Audience Popularity 最受觀眾歡迎獎
2000	10. Bernice Liu 廖碧兒	Perfect Complexion Award 完美肌膚獎
2000	9. Loretta Hsiao 蕭惠茵	Best Posture Award 優美體態獎
2000	8. Alice Chang 張淯茜	Miss Audience Popularity 最受觀眾歡迎獎
2001	1. Leanne Lindgren 凌美美	Perfect Complexion Award 完美肌膚獎
2001	8. Teresa Tsuei 崔澤韻	Best Posture Award 優美體態獎
2001	9. Shirley Zhou 周雪	Classical Beauty Award 最具古典美小姐
2001	3. Anky Kan 簡安琪	Miss Audience Popularity 最受觀眾歡迎獎
2002	7. Cynthia Wong 黃家碧	Perfect Complexion Award 完美肌膚獎
2002	6. Alice Kai 蓋鶴文	Best Posture Award 優美體態獎
2002	5. Sarah Yu 余詩芹	Miss Talent 才藝小姐
2002	8. Kassie Hou 候佼伶	Miss Audience Popularity 最受觀眾歡迎獎
2003	8. Dorothy Chan 陳思雅	Perfect Complexion Award 完美肌膚獎
2003	8. Dorothy Chan 陳思雅	Best Posture Award 優美體態獎
2003	7. Linda Chung 鍾嘉欣	Miss Talent 才藝小姐
2003	7. Linda Chung 鍾嘉欣	Miss Snow Beauty 雪地美態小姐
2003	1. Queenie Chung 鍾寶瑜	Miss Audience Popularity 最受觀眾歡迎獎
2004	7. Pearl Hsu 徐珮郁	Perfect Complexion Award 完美肌膚獎
2004	7. Pearl Hsu 徐珮郁	Miss Energetic 活力超凡獎
2004	10. Leanne Li 李亞男	Best Posture Award 優美體態獎
2004	4. Elisa Leung 梁伊莎	Miss Modern Elegance 時尚風采獎
2004	2. Wendy Mui 梅詠欣	Miss Audience Popularity 最受觀眾歡迎獎
2005	1. Lora Sun 孫青青	Best Posture Award 優美體態獎
2005	1. Lora Sun 孫青青	Miss Energetic 活力超凡獎
2005	5. Kayi Cheung 張嘉兒	Vivacious Beauty Award 神采飛揚獎
2005	2. Fiti Liu 劉佳	Perfect Complexion Award 完美肌膚獎
2005	3. Karen Liu 劉珮如	Miss Audience Popularity 最受觀眾歡迎獎
2006	9. Sisi Liu 劉斯斯	Perfect Complexion Award 完美肌膚獎
2006	6. Carrie Wang 王藝瞳	Best Posture Award 優美體態獎
2006	6. Carrie Wang 王藝瞳	Vivacious Beauty Award 神采飛揚獎
2006	3. Natalie Zhang 張譯文	Miss Energetic 活力超凡獎
2006	3. Natalie Zhang 張譯文	Beautiful Life Ambassador Award 美麗人生大使獎
2006	7. Amy So 蘇家慧	Audience Popularity Award 一見傾心佳麗大獎
2006	7. Amy So 蘇家慧	Classic Elegance Award 丰姿卓約大獎
2007	8. Jessica Choi 蔡凱欣	Perfect Complexion Award 完美肌膚獎
2007	8. Jessica Choi 蔡凱欣	Vivacious Beauty Award 神采飛揚獎
2007	9. Jessie Huang 黃悅	Best Posture Award 優美體態獎
2007	6. Leslie Chow 周嘉玲	Miss Energetic 活力超凡獎
2007	1. Queenie Ma 馬鈞怡	Audience Popularity Award 一見傾心佳麗大獎
2007	3. Gloria Tan 譚家榮	Beautiful Life Ambassador Award 美麗人生大使獎
2007	7. Lu Lu 陸璐	Classic Elegance Award 丰姿卓約大獎
2008	7. Coco Yiu 姚咨嫺	Perfect Complexion Award 完美肌膚獎
2008	8. Jiana Ling 凌嘉娜	Best Posture Award 優美體態獎
2008	3. Shu Yi Lu 陸舒怡	Miss Vitality 活力超凡獎
2008	9. Cici Chen 陳娜良子	Vivacious Beauty Award 神采飛揚獎
2008	10. Vivian Zou 鄒婷婷	Audience Popularity Award 一見傾心佳麗大獎
2009	1. Jinting Zhu 朱津葶	Best Posture Award 優美體態獎
2009	5. Vicki Li 李子穎	Miss Vitality 活力超凡獎
2009	10. Pacifica Chen 陳采風	Vivacious Beauty Award 神采飛揚獎
2009	7. Eliza Sam 岑麗香	Communicator Award 傳城大獎
2010	5. Jenny Leung 梁靜怡	Charming Communicator Award 魅力全城大獎
2010	3. Jessie Li 李穆知	Best Posture Award 優美體態獎
2010	6. Linda Wang 王冠	Vivacious Beauty Award 神采飛揚獎
2011	5. Erica Chui 徐穎堃	Best Posture Award 優美體態獎
2011	5. Erica Chui 徐穎堃	Classy Elegance Award 高雅氣質獎
2011	5. Erica Chui 徐穎堃	Perfect Complexion Award 完美肌膚獎
2011	9. Vicky Chan 陳偉琪	Best Model Performance Award 最優雅模特獎
2011	1. Alyssa Sy 施穎瑜	Charming Communicator Award 魅力全城大獎
2011	3. Natalie Cheung 張瑋珊	Pure Beauty Award 清純美態獎
2012	7. Gloria Tang 鄧佩儀	Best Posture Award
2012	2. Linna Huynh 黃碧蓮	Best Complexion Award
2012	9. Christina Wang 王蘊	Dazzling Flair Award
2012	1. Diana Wu 吳迪	Perfect Silhouette Award
2013	5. Cindy Zhong 鍾熠	Best Posture Award
2013	8. Jennifer Lee 李佳美	Sparkling Newstar Award
2013	8. Jennifer Lee 李佳美	Dazzling Flair Award
2013	1. Jamie Gao 高嘉馨	Most Charming Smile Award
2014	2. Zoe Gu 顧思伊	Best Posture Award
2014	9. Maggie Wu 吳嘉瑤	Sparkling Newstar Award
2014	1. Jessica Hsu 許君儀	Dazzling Flair Award
2014	8. Sandra Chou 周昕穎	Outstanding Intelligence Award
2015	7. Louise Dong 董漣漪	Best Posture Award
2015	5. Margarita Chun 秦銘沁	Sparkling Newstar Award
2015	6. Jennifer Coosemans 朱亞琳	Dazzling Flair Award
2015	6. Jennifer Coosemans 朱亞琳	Perfect Silhouette Award
2016	1. Prenda Wang 王譯斐	Contemporary Beauty Award
2016	9. Phoebe Kut 吉蓁蓁	Sparkling Newstar Award
2016	4. Maria Rincon 王思思	Dazzling Flair Award
2016	7. Sherry Xue 薛茹心	Perfect Silhouette Award
2016	5. Maggie Yu 喻子馨	Outstanding Intelligence Award
2016	4. Maria Rincon 王思思	My Dream Girl Award
2016	4. Maria Rincon 王思思	Charming Smile Award
2017	1. Tingting Niu 牛婷婷	Perfect Complexion Award 完美肌膚獎
2017	9. Ruby Ng 伍沛盈	Arctic Fame Diamonds 最上鏡小姐
2017	8. Cheryl Ng 伍殷嬅	My Dream Girl Award
2017	8. Cheryl Ng 伍殷嬅	Charming Award
2017	1. Tingting Niu 牛婷婷	Outstanding Intelligence Award
2020	3. Ariel Cao 曹晶晶	Sparkling New Star Award
2020	7. Kitty Yao 姚珮泓	Healthy Charm Award
2021	8. Carmen Cheung 張嘉文	Sparkling New Star
2023	4. Janice Chan 陳思穎	Elegance in Motion Award
2023	8. Erin Wong 黃穎琳	Outstanding Intelligence Award 才智出眾獎
2023	8. Erin Wong 黃穎琳	Royal Jubilee Cordial Beauty Award 港利行花旗參真心真意獎
2023	5. Isabella Zhai 翟悅迪	Healthy Charm Award
2023	6. Annie Zhang 張安妮	Beauty Court Glowing Attraction Award 美容閣明艷照人獎
2024	1. Shania Fu 符冬鈺	Outstanding Intelligence Award 才智出眾獎
2024	3. Jennifer Huang 黃紀瑩	Cordial Beauty Award 港利行花旗參真心真意獎
2024	4. Marina Yu 鬱嘉寧	Glowing Attraction Award 美容閣明艷照人獎
2024	5. Olivia Zou 鄒菡竹	AI Infinite Radiance Award 御燕AI引力無限獎
2025	8. Tiffany Chan 陳恬兒	Outstanding Intelligence Award 才智出眾獎
2025	2. Joanna Fu 傅佳愛	Royal Jubilee Cordial Beauty Award 港利行花旗參真心真意獎
2025	5. Charlene Bi 畢淺兒	Beauty Court Glowing Attraction Award 美容閣明艷照人獎
2025	3. Sophia Yin 殷千葉	AI Infinite Radiance Award 御燕AI引力無限獎
2026		

== MCV at Miss Chinese International Pageant ==
Vancouver has generally been fairly successful at the Miss Chinese International Pageant (MCI) despite not placing in the top 3 until 1993, when Miss Vancouver Chinatown 1992, Elaine Barbara Der finished as 2nd runner up. In 2001, Miss Chinese Vancouver produced Vancouver's first MCI winner, Bernice Liu. Liu later joined TVB and is currently an actress. She was succeeded by Shirley Zhou in 2002. Linda Chung and Leanne Li then both won the Miss Chinese International 2004 and 2005 titles, represectively. Vancouver has produced 7 winners and including two back-to-back wins (2001 and 2002; 2004 and 2005), a record no other city has yet to break.

Note: The winners from 1987 to 1994 (competing at Miss Chinese International 1988 to 1995) are Miss Vancouver Chinatown, the pageant that was replaced by MCV.

Year represented at MCI	Delegate number & name	Age^{1}	Placement (if any)	Special awards won (if any)	Notes
2019	19. Alice Lin 林昀佳	27	Top 10		
2018	16. Cheryl Ng 伍殷嬅	24	Top 5		
2017	16. Maria Rincon 王思思	22			
2016	14. Jennifer Coosemans 朱亞琳	21	Winner		
2015	17. Erica Chen 陳怡靜	24	Top 5		
2014	16. Cindy Zhong 鍾熠	23	First Runner-Up		
2013	16. Gloria Tang 鄧佩儀	20	Winner		TVB Artiste
2012	18. Susan Su 蘇慧文	20			Because no MCI pageant was held in 2011, both MCV 2010 and 2011 were allowed to compete in MCI 2012.
2012	19. Erica Chui 徐穎堃	24			Because no MCI pageant was held in 2011, both MCV 2010 and 2011 were allowed to compete in MCI 2012.
2010	19. Eliza Sam 岑麗香	25	Winner		TVB Actress
2009	26. Cici Chen 陳娜良子	23	Second Runner-Up	* Oriental Charm Ambassador Award	Previously Miss Shanghai 2003
2008	16. Jessica Choi 蔡凱欣	19			Fairchild TV Artiste
2007	14. Susanna Su 蘇小蕊	23	Top 10		
2006	1. Crystal Li 李培禎	24	Top 5		Model in Taiwan
2005	15. Leanne Li 李亞男	20	Winner		TVB Actress
2004	12. Linda Chung 鍾嘉欣	19	Winner		TVB Actress & singer
2003	15. Annie Wang 王燁希				
2002	7. Shirley Zhou 周雪	20	Winner	* Miss Beauty And The Beast	
2001	8. Bernice Liu 廖碧兒	22	Winner	* Miss Talent * Miss Cosmopolitan	Actress & singer
2000	15. Crystal Pan 潘欣欣		Second Runner-Up		Fairchild TV Artiste until 2003
1999	9. Janice Lee 李孟潔				
1998	9. Dina Goh 戈婷				Top 5 in viewer's voting
1997	12. Nancy Chong 莊慧芬				
1996	6. Tracey Wong 黃月明				First Miss Chinese Vancouver winner at Miss Chinese International pageant. TVB Actress until 2005.

^{1} Age at the time of the Miss Chinese International pageant

Note: This chart only reflects Miss Chinese International Pageant contestants that were winners of Miss Chinese (Vancouver) Pageant, not of Miss Vancouver Chinatown Pageant, which is a separate pageant altogether.

== See also ==
- Miss Chinese Toronto Pageant
- Miss Chinese International Pageant
- Miss NY Chinese
- Miss Vancouver Chinatown
