= Miss Chinese Toronto Pageant =

Canadian beauty pageant

- 多倫多華裔小姐競選
- Miss Chinese Toronto Pageant official logo
- Abbreviation: MCTP, 多倫多小姐
- Formation: 1995; 31 years ago
- Type: Beauty pageant
- Purpose: Annual beauty pageant to crown the best representative of Chinese Canadians in Toronto beauty
- Location(s): Sheraton Parkway Hotel, Richmond Hill, Ontario (1995); Metro Toronto Convention Centre, Toronto, Ontario (1996-2019); Chinese Cultural Centre Of Greater Toronto, Toronto, Ontario (2022-2024); Hilton Markham Suites & Conference Centre, Markham, Ontario (2025-present)
- Members: Miss Chinese International (1995–present)
- Official language: Cantonese, Mandarin, English
- Current title holder: Jenny Lin 林采妮 (2025)
- Parent organization: Fairchild TV
- Website: www.torontochinesepageant.com

Miss Chinese Toronto Pageant
- Traditional Chinese: 多倫多華裔小姐競選
- Simplified Chinese: 多伦多华裔小姐竞选
Transcriptions
Standard Mandarin
- Hanyu Pinyin: Duōlúnduō huáyì xiǎojiě jìngxuǎn
Yue: Cantonese
- Jyutping: do1 leon4 do1 waa4 jeoi6 siu2 ze2 ging6 syun2

Greater Toronto Chinese Pageant
- Traditional Chinese: 大多市華裔小姐競選
- Simplified Chinese: 大多市华裔小姐竞选
Transcriptions
Standard Mandarin
- Hanyu Pinyin: Dàduō shì huáyì xiǎojiě jìngxuǎn
Yue: Cantonese
- Jyutping: daai6 do1 si5 waa4 jeoi6 siu2 ze2 ging6 syun2

The Miss Chinese Toronto Pageant (多倫多華裔小姐競選), also known as MCTP, and formerly known as the Greater Toronto Chinese Pageant (大多市華裔小姐競選) prior to 1999, is an annual beauty pageant organized by Fairchild TV that selects Toronto's representative for the annual Miss Chinese International Pageant, held in Hong Kong, organized by TVB. It is unrelated to the now-discontinued Miss Chinese Scarborough Pageant which was also hosted in the same region. The current Miss Chinese Toronto is Jenny Lin (林采妮), winner of the 2025 pageant.

The winner of the pageant can then sign with Fairchild TV as a presenter, or often other popular contestants sign with Fairchild TV, even without a title. It is one of the most recognized beauty pageants among Chinese Canadian diaspora, alongside its Vancouver counterpart.

== Requirements ==
Contestants must be of at least partial Chinese descent and have resided in Canada for continuous period of 6 months or a total of one year on the day the application form is signed. The age requirement is 17–27 (expanded in 2011).

== Miss Chinese Toronto titleholders ==
This is a full list of winners since the pageant's inception in 1995, available on the Miss Chinese Toronto official website.

=== Winner charts ===
Year	Name	Number
1995	Patsy Poon 潘美詩	8
1996	Monica Lo 盧淑儀	7
1997	Julia Fong 房翠麗	9
1998	Audrey Li 李酈	9
1999	Helen Lin 林凱倫	3
2000	Cissy Wang 汪詩詩	6
2001	Christie Bartram 白穎茵	1
2002	Diana Wu 吳丹	1
2003	Sarina Lee 李翹欣	4
2004	Lena Ma 馬艶冰	5
2005	Elva Ni 倪晨曦	6
2006	Sherry Chen 陳爽	3
2007	Liang Wang 王靚	4
2008	Christine Kuo 苟芸慧	4
2009	Candy Chang 張慧雯	8
2010	Hilary Tam 譚曉榆	3
2011	Ashton Hong 洪美珊	6
2012	Jessica Song 宋沁禕	2
2013	Mandy Liang 梁淼	5
2014	Valerie Fong 方詩揚	10
2015	Sissi Ke 柯思懿	7
2016	Gloria Li 李珮儀	3
2017	Tiffany Choi 蔡菀庭	9
2018	Summer Yang 楊昳譞	5
2019	Xiaoyu Chen 陳曉宇	5
2020	Bella Wei 魏詩佳	4
2021	Oceana Ling-Kurie 林小海	2
2022	Nicole Xu 徐熙儀	4
2023	Arya Zhang 張詩曼	7
2024	Juvally Chan 陳靖如	1
2025	Jenny Lin 林采妮	4
2026		
2027		
2028		

== Full award winners list 2010–present ==
2010

Number	Name	Placement
3	Hilary Tam 譚曉榆	Winner 冠軍
9	Sonia Cheung 張麗雅	First Runner-Up 亞軍
8	Bess Yu 于夢媛	Second Runner-Up 季軍
2	Wendy Wen 全家欣	Miss Friendship 友誼小姐
6	Chloe Zheng 鄭瑞睿	Most Talented 傑出才藝獎
3	Hilary Tam 譚曉榆	Charming Communicator Award 『魅力傳城』大獎
9	Sonia Cheung 張麗雅	Beautiful Hair 亮麗美髮獎
4	Gail Borjiet 博樂	Perfect Complexion 純美肌膚獎
3	Hilary Tam 譚曉榆	Miss Photogenic 最上鏡小姐
6	Chloe Zheng 鄭瑞睿	Vivacious Beauty Award 神采飛揚獎

2011

Number	Name	Placement
6	Ashton Hong 洪美珊	Winner 冠軍
5	Irene Bai 白晨柳	First Runner-Up 亞軍
2	Nana Liu 柳曦穎	Second Runner-Up 季軍
6	Ashton Hong 洪美珊	Miss Photogenic 最上鏡小姐
6	Ashton Hong 洪美珊	Miss Talent 傑出才藝獎
6	Ashton Hong 洪美珊	Charming Communicator Award 『魅力傳城』大獎
2	Nana Liu 柳曦穎	Beautiful Hair亮麗美髮獎
10	Jenni Tran 陳愛徽	Miss Friendship 友誼小姐

2012

Number	Name	Placement
2	Jessica Song 宋沁禕	Winner 冠軍
10	Joy Yang 楊川儀	First Runner-Up 亞軍
7	Adriana Zhang 張洋	Second Runner-Up 季軍
7	Adriana Zhang 張洋	Miss Photogenic 最上鏡小姐
2	Jessica Song 宋沁禕	Miss Talent 傑出才藝獎
7	Adriana Zhang 張洋	Beautiful Hair亮麗美髮獎
6	Lisa Wong 黃玉文	Miss Friendship 友誼小姐

2013

Number	Name	Placement
5	Mandy Liang 梁淼	Winner 冠軍
6	Bonnie Chan 陳雅思	First Runner-Up 亞軍
9	Whitney Lau 劉欣妮	Second Runner-Up 季軍
5	Mandy Liang 梁淼	Miss Photogenic 最上鏡小姐
9	Whitney Lau 劉欣妮	Miss Talent 傑出才藝獎
7	Sandra Huang 黃思嫻	Beautiful Hair亮麗美髮獎
8	Claudia Cheung 張翠恩	Miss Friendship 友誼小姐

2014

Number	Name	Placement
10	Valerie Fong 方詩揚	Winner 冠軍
6	Meiyi Ding 丁眉伊	First Runner-Up 亞軍
3	Tina Li 李曉恬	Second Runner-Up 季軍
10	Valerie Fong 方詩揚	Miss Photogenic 最上鏡小姐
5	Monica Wang 王呈珵	Miss Talent 傑出才藝獎
8	Confidy Kong 孔令思	Beautiful Hair亮麗美髮獎
9	Linda Zhao 趙琚瑶	Miss Friendship 友誼小姐
10	Valerie Fong 方詩揚	Charisma Award 最具魅力獎
6	Meiyi Ding 丁眉伊	Shine Confidence Award 閃耀自信獎

2015

Number	Name	Placement
7	Sissi Ke 柯思懿	Winner 冠軍
10	Juliana Qian 錢楓然	First Runner-Up 亞軍
4	Victoria Guo 郭津含	Second Runner-Up 季軍
7	Sissi Ke 柯思懿	Miss Photogenic 最上鏡小姐
4	Victoria Guo 郭津含	Miss Talent 傑出才藝獎
4	Victoria Guo 郭津含	Beautiful Hair亮麗美髮獎
8	Emily Yau 邱國晴	Miss Friendship 友誼小姐
7	Sissi Ke 柯思懿	Charisma Award 最具魅力獎
10	Juliana Qian 錢楓然	Shine Confidence Award 閃耀自信獎
7	Sissi Ke 柯思懿	Most Brilliant Smile 最燦爛笑容大獎

2016

Number	Name	Placement
3	Gloria Li 李珮儀	Winner 冠軍
9	Cassandra Cheung 張芷嘉	First Runner-Up 亞軍
6	Victoria Wong 黃嘉文	Second Runner-Up 季軍
4	Linda Liu 劉芃芃	Miss Photogenic 最上鏡小姐
3	Gloria Li 李珮儀	Beautiful Hair 亮麗美髮獎
6	Victoria Wong 黃嘉文	Miss Congeniality 友誼小姐
3	Gloria Li 李珮儀	Charisma Award 最具魅力獎
9	Cassandra Cheung 張芷嘉	Most Brilliant Smile 最燦爛笑容大獎

2017

Number	Name	Placement
3	Tiffany Choi 蔡菀庭	Winner 冠軍 and Beautiful Hair 亮麗美髮獎
9	Celine Guo 郭桐	First Runner-Up 亞軍
6	Cynthia Fu 符善婷	Second Runner-Up 季軍 and Miss Congeniality 友誼小姐
4	Selina Cheung 張芷珮	Miss Photogenic 最上鏡小姐

2018

Number	Name	Placement
5	Summer Yang 楊昳譞	Winner 冠軍
6	Melody Liang 梁嘉慧	First Runner-Up 亞軍 and Beautiful Hair 亮麗美髮獎
9	Andrea Liu 劉恩汛	Second Runner-Up 季軍 and Miss Photogenic 最上鏡小姐
7	Jenny Yao 姚榕	Miss Talent 傑出才藝獎
1	Angela Wong 黃杏儀	Miss Congeniality 友誼小姐
10	Yolanda Xu 許瀟予	Most Brilliant Smile 最燦爛笑容大獎

2019

Number	Name	Placement
5	Xiaoyu Chen 陳曉宇	Winner 冠軍 and Miss Congeniality 友誼小姐
7	Anna Tian 田雪純	First Runner-Up 亞軍 and Miss Photogenic 最上鏡小姐
1	Elaine Qian 錢寓凡	Second Runner-Up 季軍
2	Serena Kwok 郭凱婷	Beautiful Hair 亮麗美髮獎
3	Ida Tsang 曾珮玲	Most Brilliant Smile 最燦爛笑容大獎

2020

Number	Name	Placement
4	Bella Wei 魏詩佳	Winner 冠軍
7	Deeana Ou 區鈺頤	First Runner-Up 亞軍 and Miss Friendship 友誼小姐
8	Rachel Kuang 鄺瀞甜	Second Runner-Up 季軍 and Beautiful Hair 亮麗美髮獎
2	Mia Yang 楊柳	Miss Photogenic 最上鏡小姐

2021

Number	Name	Placement
2	Oceana Ling-Kurie 林小海	Winner 冠軍 and Miss Photogenic 最上鏡小姐
5	Janelle Liu 劉辰言	First Runner-Up 亞軍
6	Athena Chen 陳玥彤	Second Runner-Up 季軍

2022

Number	Name	Placement
4	Nicole Xu 徐熙儀	Winner 冠軍
3	Yvonne Shen 沈揚	First Runner-Up 亞軍 and Miss Photogenic 最上鏡小姐
6	Addy Luo 羅笑笑	Second Runner-Up 季軍 and Beautiful Hair 亮麗美髮獎
2	Claire Wu 吳蕾	Miss Friendship 友誼小姐

2023

Number	Name	Placement
7	Arya Zhang 張詩曼	Winner 冠軍 and Miss Photogenic 最上鏡小姐
2	Jennifer Choi 蔡卓穎	First Runner-Up 亞軍 and Miss Friendship 友誼小姐
1	Yolanda Chen 陳奕霖	Second Runner-Up 季軍
8	Irene Li 李采薇	Silky Hair 丝滑的头发

2024

Number	Name	Placement
1	Juvally Chan 陳靖如	Winner 冠軍
3	Natalie So 蘇芷晞	First Runner-Up 亞軍
2	Samantha Chim 詹星悅	Second Runner-Up 季軍 and Miss Photogenic 最上鏡小姐
5	Delaney Yau 游慈欣	Miss Friendship 友誼小姐
4	Carly Lee 李嘉莉	Beautiful Hair 亮麗美髮獎

2025

Number	Name	Placement
4	Jenny Lin 林采妮	Winner 冠軍 and Miss Photogenic 最上鏡小姐
1	Jessica Li 李焯欣	First Runner-Up 亞軍 and Silky Hair 亮麗美髮獎
6	Cecilia Chan 陳梓穎	Second Runner-Up 季軍
7	Christine Mo 莫嘉盈	Miss Congeniality 友誼小姐

2026

Number	Name	Placement
		Winner 冠軍
		First Runner-Up 亞軍
		Second Runner-Up 季軍
		Miss Congeniality 友誼小姐

== Masters of ceremonies ==
- 1995: Lawrence Cheng 鄭丹瑞, Deborah Moore 狄寶娜摩亞
- 1996: Philip Chan 陳欣健, Dominic Lam 林嘉華
- 1997: Philip Chan 陳欣健, Lawrence Cheng 鄭丹瑞
- 1998: Dominic Lam 林嘉華, Astrid Chan 陳芷菁
- 1999: Dominic Lam 林嘉華, Astrid Chan 陳芷菁
- 2000: Dominic Lam 林嘉華, Winnie Young 楊婉儀
- 2001: Dominic Lam 林嘉華, Lesley Yip 葉子青
- 2002: Dominic Lam 林嘉華, Poon Chung Ming 潘宗明
- 2003: Dominic Lam 林嘉華, Jennifer Lo 羅爵暉, Diana Wu 吳丹
- 2004: Dominic Lam 林嘉華, River Lee 李亭
- 2005: Dominic Lam 林嘉華, Jennifer Lo 羅爵暉, Lesley Yip 葉子青
- 2006: Dominic Lam 林嘉華, Amigo Choi 崔建邦, River Lee 李亭
- 2007: Dominic Lam 林嘉華, Leo Shiu 蕭嘉俊
- 2008: Dominic Lam 林嘉華, Joey Leung 梁榮忠, Local Fairchild TV Hosts 當地著名節目主持人, Grace Xiao 曉露
- 2009: Dominic Lam 林嘉華, Castro Liu 廖立暉
- 2010: Dominic Lam 林嘉華, Leo Shiu 蕭嘉俊, Grace Xiao 曉露
- 2011: Dominic Lam 林嘉華, Derek To 杜挺豪, Grace Xiao 曉露
- 2012: Dominic Lam 林嘉華, Derek To 杜挺豪, Leo Shiu 蕭嘉俊
- 2013: Leo Shiu 蕭嘉俊, Castro Liu 廖立暉, Qin Yi 秦屹
- 2014: Leo Shiu 蕭嘉俊, Ong Yi Hing 王貽興, Qin Yi 秦屹
- 2015: Leo Shiu 蕭嘉俊, Marcus Kwok 郭田葰, Qin Yi 秦屹
- 2016: Leo Shiu 蕭嘉俊, Kenneth Chan 陳啟泰, Qin Yi 秦屹
- 2017: Leo Shiu 蕭嘉俊, Ricky Fan 范振鋒, Qin Yi 秦屹
- 2018: Leo Shiu 蕭嘉俊, Kenneth Chan 陳啟泰, Qin Yi 秦屹
- 2019: Leo Shiu 蕭嘉俊, Qin Yi 秦屹
- 2020: Leo Shiu 蕭嘉俊, Denise Liang 莎菲寶
- 2021: Leo Shiu 蕭嘉俊, Denise Liang 莎菲寶
- 2022: Leo Shiu 蕭嘉俊, Matthew Mui 梅志輝
- 2023: Leo Shiu 蕭嘉俊, Albert Cheung 章志文
- 2024: Leo Shiu 蕭嘉俊, Albert Cheung 章志文
- 2025: Leo Shiu 蕭嘉俊, Albert Cheung 章志文
- 2026: Leo Shiu 蕭嘉俊, Albert Cheung 章志文

== Special performing guests ==
- 1995: Leo Ku 古巨基
- 1996: Not Available
- 1997: Not Available
- 1998: Not Available
- 1999: Not Available
- 2000: Not Available
- 2001: Not Available
- 2002: Not Available
- 2003: Ivan Ho 何念如
- 2004: Barry Yip 葉文輝
- 2005: Joe Ma 馬德鐘
- 2006: Moses Chan 陳豪
- 2007: Michael Tong 唐文龍
- 2008: Bosco Wong 黃宗澤
- 2009: Kenneth Ma 馬國明, Angel Wang 王倩 (Local Guest)
- 2010: Eric Suen 孫耀威
- 2011: Jerry Lamb 林曉峰
- 2012: Vincent Wong 王浩信
- 2013: Oscar Leung 梁烈唯
- 2014: Hubert Wu 胡鴻鈞
- 2015: Yao Bin 姚兵
- 2016: William Hu 胡渭康
- 2017: Sammy Sum 沈震軒
- 2018: Hugo Ng 吳岱融
- 2019: James Chou 羽田, Shuhei 長宇
- 2020: Not Available
- 2021: Not Available
- 2022: Patrick Tang 鄧健泓
- 2023: James Chou 羽田, Him Law 羅子溢
- 2024: Germano Bibi Guilherme 古淖文
- 2025: FC Tam 譚輝智
- 2026: Ramon Lo 羅啟豪

== MCT at Miss Chinese International Pageant ==
- Toronto participated at Miss Chinese International 國際中華小姐競選 every year, except in 1989, 1994, and 1995. The representatives that participated before 1996 were all winners of the Greater Toronto Chinese Pageant.

Year represented at MCI	Delegate number & name	Age^{1}	Placement (if any)	Special awards won (if any)	Notes
2019	18. Summer Yang 楊昳譞	26			
2018	15. Tiffany Choi 蔡菀庭	23	Top 5		
2017	15. Gloria Li 李珮儀	24	Top 10	Miss Finesse (Best Talent Performance Award)	
2016	13. Sissi Ke 柯思懿	23			
2015	16. Valerie Fong 方詩揚	26	Top 10		
2014	15. Mandy Liang 梁淼	26	Top 10		
2013	15. Jessica Song 宋沁禕	23	Top 5 Finalist	Star of Tomorrow Award	
2012	17. Ashton Hong 洪美珊	19		Miss Friendship	Because Miss Chinese International Pageant was not held in 2011, both 2010 and 2011 MCT winners were invited to compete in the 2012 pageant.
2012	16.Hilary Tam 譚曉榆	24			Because Miss Chinese International Pageant was not held in 2011, both 2010 and 2011 MCT winners were invited to compete in the 2012 pageant.
2010	18. Candy Chang 張慧雯	20	2nd runner up		TVB Actress
2009	24. Christine Kuo 苟芸慧	25	Winner	International Charm Ambassador	TVB Actress
2008	18. Liang Wang 王靚	18			
2007	4. Sherry Chen 陳爽	23	2nd runner up		TVB Actress, Hong Kong Model
2006	12. Elva Ni 倪晨曦	18	Top 5 Finalist		Hong Kong Model, Ni's sister competed in Miss Chinese Toronto 2007 and received the Charming Communicator Award.
2005	12. Lena Ma 馬艶冰	17			Later Miss World Canada 2009, 4th runner up at Miss World 2009. Model
2004	16. Sarina Lee 李翹欣	20			
2003	10. Diana Wu 吳丹	18	2nd runner up		
2002	5. Christie Bartram 白穎茵	18	1st runner up	Miss Svelte Beauty	Competed in Miss Universe Canada 2003. Did not make the top 10.
2001	5. Cissy Wang 汪詩詩	19			Wife of actor Donnie Yen
2000	12. Ava Chan 陳仙仙	19			Chan was 1st runner up at Miss Chinese Toronto 1999, but was selected to compete in MCI.
1999	8. Audrey Li 李酈		Top 5 Finalist		
1998	8. Julia Fong 房翠麗				
1997	5. Monica Lo 盧淑儀	18	Winner		Actress
1996	5. Patsy Poon 潘美詩		Top 10 Semifinalist		
1993	20. Wong Man Ching 王文靜				
1992	8. Rosemary Chan 陳曼莉	23	Winner	Media's Favorite Award, Miss Oriental Charm	
1991	3. Jenny Hon 韓宗妮	22			
1988	1. Yuen Mei Mak 麥宛美	20			

^{1} Age at the time of the Miss Chinese International pageant

== See also ==
- Miss Chinese Vancouver Pageant
- Miss Chinese International Pageant
- Miss NY Chinese
- Miss Chinese International Pageant 2009
- Miss Chinese International Pageant 1997
- Miss Chinese International Pageant 1992
