= Elva Ni =

Hong Kong actress

- Chinese: 倪晨曦
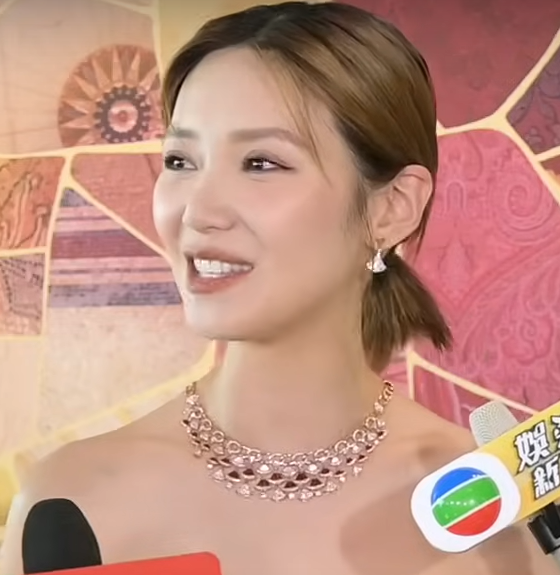
- Ni in March 2024
- Born: 15 August 1987 (age 39) Nanjing, China
- Citizenship: Canada
- Education: University of Toronto
- Years active: 2005–present
- Agent: Unique Model Limited
- Awards: 2005 Miss Chinese Toronto Pageant Miss Mirror, Perfect Body Award, Outstanding Talent Award

Elva Ni (Chinese: 倪晨曦; pinyin: Ní Chéngxī, born 15 August 1987) is a Hong Kong actress, model, television presenter, and yoga instructor. She participated in the 2006 Miss Chinese International Pageant.

== Early life ==
On August 15, 1987, Ni was born in Nanjing, China. Ni's family immigrated to Canada. She has a twin sister called Jennifer, who is residing in Canada.

== Education ==
In 2005 at age 18, Ni won the 2005 Miss Chinese Toronto Pageant. In 2006 she participated in the Miss Chinese International Pageant. Afterwards, instead of immediately joining the entertainment industry, she returned to Canada to continue her studies. In 2006, Ni graduated from University of Toronto, majoring in economics. During her time there, she became a host of Toronto New Age Television programmes.

== Career ==
After graduating in 2006, Ni moved from Canada to Hong Kong to pursue an acting career. She appeared in print and television advertisements and worked on film and television projects. Her work included collaborations across various media platforms, including television, online content, print publications, and fashion-related events.

Ni is also a cosmetologist, and has 110,000 subscribers on her YouTube Beauty Travel Channel, and her highest CTR video has 250,000 clicks; in addition she has more than four years of yoga experience, obtaining different yoga instructor licenses, from time to time with different brands, taught yoga activities, shared and promoted healthy living and beauty with others and a positive attitude to life, and believed that they could both inside and outside.

== Personal life ==
Ni announced her engagement on YouTube at 4 January 2019. Her fiancé is known as Mr. V even though she hasn't mentioned his full name yet. Ni has announced that she married Mr. Vincent.

== Filmography ==
=== Films ===
Year	Title	Role
2011	All's Well, Ends Well 2011	
2011	Mengyou	
2012	All's Well, Ends Well 2012	
2012	Mori Laidian (Wei Dianying)	
2012	The Bounty	
2012	My Sassy Hubby	Annie
2013	The Best Plan Is No Plan	Miss Pan
2015	Xiaojie You Xin	Po's (Liu Xin You decoration) cousin
2024	Love Lies	Mrs. Chow

=== Dubbing ===
Year	Title	Role
2017	The Lego Ninjago Movie	Chi Lan

=== TV series ===
- 2011: Shenbian De Xingfu (mainland TV series)

=== Short films ===
- 2011: Na Nian

=== Presented programmes ===
==== Toronto New Age Television ====
- 2006–09 What's On
- 2007 Chengshi Da Shijie

==== Hong Kong and the Mainland ====
- 2010 Xingguang Xiawu Cha
- 2014 Wo Shi Geshou 2 (nowTV broadcast)
- 2014 Caokong Yinyue (nowTV)
- 2016 Yo! Gym+ (ViuTV)
- 2017 Full Time Mommy Holidays (ViuTV)

=== TV programmes ===
- 2011: Zhi Xing Zhi Jin Sifang Cheng
- 2012: Kuaile Lantian Xia
- 2017: Fan Dou Yingyu 2011 The English Cult Unit as Elva, yoga coach

== Advertising shooting ==
- 2010: AMTD Still by Wealth Planning Beauty Nicole (Elva Ni)
- 2010: Elva Ni, Sen the United States Cracked Con Rumors - "Bridesmaids"
- 2010: Hong Kong China Travel Service "Friendship Deep Feeling Jane" TV commercials
- 2010: Li Ning Clothing catalogue
- 2011: Ocean Park
- 2011: China Resources
- 2011: Whiteplan Teeth Whitening
- 2011: BEA Bank
- 2011: Tianjin Road Oolong Tea_1
- 2011: Tianjin Road Oolong Tea_2
- 2011: PCCW
- 2011: Li Ning Clothing catalogue
- 2012: Shu Uemura
- 2012: Macau Galaxy
- 2012: Standard Chartered Bank Shocks Stock Offers TV Commercials
- 2013: Shu Uemura Print Ad (HK)
- 2013: French Wedding print ad
- 2013: Bank of China
- 2013: Kisses Chocolate Print
- 2013: Nivea (Chian)
- 2013: C&S Tissue
- 2015: HTC Mobile
- 2015: Philips print ad
- 2016: Slimbeauty print ad

== Awards ==
- 2005 Miss Chinese Toronto Pageant - Champion, Miss Mirror, Outstanding Talent Award, Perfect Body Award
- Miss Chinese International 2006 - The Top Five

== News ==
- Elva Ni gave birth to high like Wu Liang model Oriental Daily 23 Jul 2010
- Elva Ni Debut Screen has a New Year's Eve Oriental Daily 10 Dec 2010
- Elva Ni Wins the Grand Canal Oriental Daily 5 Feb 2011
- Elva Ni Use Mode from the Model to the Shadow Tianzi The Sun 6 Aug 2011
- Elva Ni Shoot the Ad Shouting Enough for a Minute Wen Wei Po 29 Mar 2012
- Elva Ni Captive over a Hundred Boys Oriental Daily 28 Jun 2012
- Elva Ni: Mr. Right Do Not Be Pretty Oriental Daily 31 Aug 2012
- Only Pursue "Hong Kong" Movie Dream Elva Ni no Regrets The Sun 1 Sep 2012
- Elva Ni Skiing All Over the Place The Sun 6 Feb 2013
- Elva Ni Favorite Shimei Oriental Daily 11 Feb 2013
- Elva Ni Out of the Sexy Calendar Apple Daily 30 Nov 2013

Preceded by Lena Ma	Miss Chinese Toronto Pageant; 2005	Succeeded by Sherry Chen
