= OL Supreme =

- Official poster
- 女王辦公室
- Genre: Modern Sitcom
- Starring: Liza Wang; Chapman To; Denise Ho; Ron Ng; Joel Chan; Lau Kong
- Opening theme: Suffer (捱) by Chapman To, Ron Ng, Denise Ho
- Country of origin: Hong Kong
- Original language: Cantonese
- No. of episodes: 80

Production
- Producer: Wong Wai Sing
- Running time: 22 minutes (approx.)

Original release
- Network: TVB
- Release: February 22 – June 12, 2010

OL Supreme
- Title screen shot
- Traditional Chinese: 女王辦公室
- Simplified Chinese: 女王办公室
- Literal meaning: "Queen's Office"
Transcriptions
Standard Mandarin
- Hanyu Pinyin: Nǚ wáng bàng ōng shì
Yue: Cantonese
- Jyutping: neoi5 wong4 baan6 gung1 sat1

OL Supreme (Chinese: 女王辦公室; lit. 'Queen's Office') (Nǚ wáng bàng ōng shì) is a TVB half-hour modern sitcom series.

== Synopsis ==
Divorced LUI SIU FUNG (Liza Wang) is the CEO's secretary of a mall management company and is the head of the company's secretaries. She has been working for many years in the company, gaining the trust of the CEO SO DAI TUNG (Cheung Kwok Keung). SO is weak and afraid of dealing with situations, so Fung takes care of business and issues happening around the company. In the office, she is known as the Queen of the Office, and others in the company are afraid of her.

The Publicity Department will soon have a new manager, during the recruitment process Fung encounters single father SI SAP YAT (Chapman To) who she did not see as a secretary for a variety of reasons, but in the end he was appointed as one. One man in the secretary world led and dominated by women will eventually lead to a series of storms. Turns out that the new manager is Fung's long lost daughter MIU SIK CHI (Denise Ho).

Sik and Fung were separated for several years, the mother and daughter were originally very happy together, but Sik is very cold towards Fung. Sik's position is even higher than Fung in the office and was not adapted to the rules set by Fung. She was also not satisfied with how Fung treated her father in the past. In the office, the relationship between the two were full of storms, troubles and hatred.

Fung and her neighbors knew each other for many years, but even after work Fung thinks of herself as a Queen. Fung is longing to learn more about her daughter Sik, but wanted to save face so she asked Sik's childhood nerdy friend LING SIU KEI (Ron Ng) who is a fan of buses to help be the mother and daughter's bridge. Kei lacked a mother since youth, while Fung who watched his growth is like a mother to him. When Sik and Kei met again, she recommended him to work in Fung's company becoming colleagues.

== Cast ==
Cast	Role	Description
Liza Wang	Lui Siu Fung (Queen) 雷小鳳	Age 52; Queen姐; Miu Sik Ji's mother Lui Yu's aunt Legend Place Selection Management Company's top secretary So Tai Tung's secretary
Chapman To	Sze Sap Yat (Leven) 施拾壹	Age 30; Father of two daughters Miu Sik Chi's secretary Miu Sik Chi's Boyfriend ex-salesman
Denise Ho	Miu Sik Chi (Music) 繆惜之	Age 28; Lui Siu Fung's daughter Sze Sap Yat's boss Sze Sap Yat's Girlfriend; Lui Yue's cousin. Promotion Department manager of Selection Management Company.
Ron Ng	Ling Siu Kei 凌笑淇	Age 28 阿K; Cheung Mei Kwan's lover Tech genius and devoted bus fan Ling Siu Yung's brother Chan Wing Yan's alleged little brother Legend Place Selection Management Company employee in Promotion Department
Power Chan	Man Cho San (Vincent) 文佐燊	Legend Place Selection Management Company's designer and consultant Miu Sik Chi's ex-husband (not legally divorced) (Cameo, episode 35-37)
Joel Chan (陳山蔥)	Lui Yue (Mario) 雷宇	Age 29; Legend Place Selection Management Company office assistant (OA); Miu Sik Chi's cousin Lui Siu Fung's nephew Lui Man Yue Chu's and Lui Siu Lung's son Sung Cho Man's Boyfriend then Husband
Cheung Kwok Keung (張國強)	So Tai Tung (Susan) 蘇大同	Age 50; CEO of Legend Place's Selection Management Company; Lui Siu Fung's boss Secretly admires Lui Siu Fung
Lam Lei (林利)	Chiu Chin Pang 趙展鵬	Legend Place's Selection Management Company leasing manager
Sire Ma	Cheung Mei Kwan 張美君	Age 23; Legend Place's Selection Management Company Employee; Chiu Chin Pang's secretary Ling Siu Kei's lover
Koni Lui	Sung Cho Man 宋初敏	Age 25; Legend Place's Selection Management Company Employee; Ha Lei Shun's secretary Lui Yue's Girlfriend then wife
Wilson Tsui (艾威)	Ha Lei Shun 夏理迅	Age 40; Summer; Legend Place executive manager
Lau Kong	Lui Siu Lung (Martin) 雷小龍	Age 60; Lui Yu's father Liu Siu Fung's brother Lui Man Yue Chu's husband Miu Sik Chi's uncle. Chan Wing Yan's first godfather.
Angelina Lo (盧宛茵)	Lui Man Yue Chu (Margaret) 雷萬如珠	Age 58; Lui Siu Lung's wife Lui Yu's mother Miu Sik Chi's aunt. Chan Wing Yan's godmother.
Kwok Fung (郭峰)	Ling Tok 凌鐸	Age 50; Owner of Tok Kee restaurant at Legend Place's food court Ling Siu Kei, Ling Siu Yung and Chan Wing Yan's father Likes Lui Siu Fung; known for his greed
Joey Mak (麥皓兒)	Ling Siu Yung 凌笑容	Age 22; Ling Siu Kei's little sister and Chan Wing Yan's god-sister Security Guard at Legend Place
Patrick Dunn	Wu Sheung Bong 鄔尚邦	Age 45; Chairman of Legend Place
Dickson Lee (李家聲)	Chun Pok Si 秦博士	Age 35; Pak Mai's husband. Ling Tok's partner at Tok Kee restaurant.
Sherry Chen	Pak Mai 白米	Age 24; Sze Sap Yat's daughters' babysitter Chun Pok Si's wife.
King Kong	Chan Wing Yan (Franky) 陳永仁	Age 27; Security guard mistaken to be Ling Tok's first son Ling Siu Kei and Ling Siu Yung's godbrother. Godson of Ling Tok, Lui Siu Lung and Lui Man Yue Chu.

== Awards and nominations ==
TVB Anniversary Awards (2010)

- Best Drama - Top 24
- Best Actress (Liza Wang) - Top 15
- Best Supporting Actor (Ron Ng) - Top 5
- Best Supporting Actress (Denise Ho) - Top 15
- My Favourite Male Character (Chapman To) - Top 15
- My Favourite Female Character (Liza Wang) - Top 15
- Most Improved Male Artiste (King Kong) - Top 5

== Viewership ratings ==
	Week	Episodes	Average Points	Peaking Points	References
1	February 22–26, 2010	1 — 5	25	27	
2	March 1–5, 2010	6 — 10	24	—	
3	March 8–12, 2010	11 — 15	24	—	
4	March 15–19, 2010	16 — 20	24	—	
5	March 22–26, 2010	21 — 25	24	—	
6	March 29 - April 2, 2010	26 — 30	27	—	
7	April 5–9, 2010	31 — 35	24	—	
8	April 12–16, 2010	36 — 40	26	—	
9	April 19–23, 2010	41 — 45	26	—	
10	April 27–29, 2010	46 — 48	25	—	
11	May 3–7, 2010	49 — 53	24	—	
12	May 10–14, 2010	54 — 58	24	27	
13	May 17–21, 2010	59 — 63	24	—	
14	May 24–28, 2010	64 — 68	25	—	
15	May 31 - June 4, 2010	69 — 73	24	—	
16	June 7–11, 2010	74 — 78	25	—	
16	June 12, 2010	79 — 80	25	—	
