= Candy Chang =

Hong Kong actor

Lizabeth Chang
- Born: 10 November 1989 (age 36); Hong Kong
- Occupation: Actress
- Years active: 2010–2018

Chinese name
Transcriptions
Standard Mandarin
- Hanyu Pinyin: Zhāng HuìWén
Yue: Cantonese
- Jyutping: zoeng1 wai6 man4

Lizabeth Chang (Chinese: 張慧雯) is a Hong Kong actress and model.

== Early life ==
She was born on November 10, 1989 in Hong Kong. Her mother is from Shanghai. She emigrated to Canada at age 7. Chang learned Japanese from her sister. She attended Unionville High School. She has a 3rd year university education majoring in Graphic Design and Visual Arts (from OCAD University). Her father is a senior voice actor.

== Career ==
She won Miss Chinese Toronto in 2009, and was second runner-up in the Miss Chinese International Pageant 2010. She was a TVB actress. She is multilingual, leading to hosting several television programs. She debuted on the popular TVB drama The Hippocratic Crush playing Kan Ching Ching 簡晶晶. Her role was critically acclaimed. She was awarded for Astro on Demand Awards for My Favourite Screen Couple with Nathan Ngai.

Chang is a non-smoker and promoted World No-Tobacco Day. She appeared in The Voice: Celebrity Edition. Her coach was her father who won an award in the competition Leslie Cheung competed in.

=== Pageants ===
She won the Miss Chinese Toronto Pageant 2009 as well as Miss Photogenic and Miss Popularity. In November 2010, she represented Toronto to compete in the Miss Chinese International Pageant 2010 and was a favourite, reportedly due to her having one of the best figures (perfect proportions of 35"-23"-35"). She was said by viewers to resemble the previous winner Christine Kuo and Miss Hong Kong winner 2006 Aimee Chan and was a top 5 favourite from the official poll and was crowned second runner-up by one of the judges 黃士心. She later signed with TVB.

- Miss Chinese Toronto 2009 Winner
- Miss Chinese Toronto 2009 Miss Photogenic
- Miss Chinese Toronto 2009 Miss Popularity
- Miss Chinese International 2010 Second Runner-up

== Filmography ==
- The Hippocratic Crush (2012)
- All Star Glam Exam (2011)
- The Hippocratic Crush II (2013)
- Bounty Lady (2013) (cameo episode 1)
- Ghost Dragon of Cold Mountain (2014)
- From Vegas to Macau II (2015)
- Momentary Lapse of Reason (2015)

== Personal life ==
Chang speaks English, Mandarin, Cantonese, and Japanese, and has studied French.

She currently lives with her father. Her mother, elder brother, and elder sister are in Canada. She did some life-guarding, and claims it helped her in The Hippocratic Crush.

Preceded by Christine Kuo	Miss Chinese Toronto; 2009	Succeeded by Hilary Tam 譚曉榆
Preceded by Christine Kuo	Miss Chinese Toronto Pageant Miss Photogenic Award; 2009	Succeeded by Hilary Tam
