= Miss Chinese International Pageant 1992 =

- Date: January 26, 1992
- Presenters: Eric Tsang, Philip Chan
- Venue: TV City, Hong Kong
- Broadcaster: TVB
- Entrants: 21
- Placements: 12
- Winner: Rosemary Chan 陳曼莉; Toronto, Ontario, Canada
- Congeniality: Sherine Seng; Auckland, New Zealand

The 4th Miss Chinese International Pageant, Miss Chinese International Pageant 1992 was held on January 26, 1992 in Hong Kong. The pageant was organized and broadcast by TVB in Hong Kong. Miss Chinese International 1991 Yen-Thean Leng crowned Rosemary Chan of Toronto, Ontario, Canada as the winner. It was also the first victory for Canada and North America. As of 2010, Toronto would win the crown for two more times.

== Pageant information ==
The theme to this year's pageant continues to be "The Traditions of the Dragon, The Embodiment of Beauty" 「龍的傳統 俏的化身」. The Masters of Ceremonies were Eric Tsang and Philip Chan.

== Results ==
Placement	Contestant	City Represented	Country Represented
Miss Chinese International 1992	Rosemary Chan 陳曼莉	Toronto	Canada
1st Runner-Up	Amy Kwok 郭藹明	Hong Kong	Hong Kong
2nd Runner-Up	Valerie H. Lee 李曉彤	San Francisco	USA
Top 12 Finalists	Ginny Sim 沈美貞; Eva Cheung 張綺華; Peggy Kongue 鄺麗珍; Michelle Low 劉金燕; Lois Wong 黃樂怡; Chanintorn Chitlada 陳麗雲; Catherine Macabulos 馬嘉寶; Lily Lee 李莉莉; Karen Lin 林蘭芷	Penang; Montréal; Tahiti; Singapore; Victoria; Bangkok; Manila; Edmonton; Taipei	Malaysia; Canada; French Polynesia; Singapore; Canada; Thailand; Philippines; Canada; Taiwan

=== Special awards ===
- Miss Friendship: [Sherine Seng] 鍾雪蓮 (Auckland)
- Miss Oriental Charm: Rosemary Chan 陳曼莉 (Toronto)
- Miss Ethnic Dress: Amy Kwok 郭藹明 (Hong Kong)
- Media's Favorite Award: Rosemary Chan 陳曼莉 (Toronto)

== Contestant list ==
No.	Contestant Name	Represented City	Represented Country	Age
1	Darleen Kim CHINN 陳小蘭	Seattle	USA	23
2	Ginny SIM 沈美貞	Penang	Malaysia	19
3	Eva CHEUNG 張綺華	Montréal	Canada	23
4	Amy KWOK 郭藹明	Hong Kong	Hong Kong	24
5	Natalie LOO 盧雪梅	Vancouver	Canada	25
6	(Fai LAM) 林輝	Sydney	Australia	22
7	Peggy KONGUE 鄺麗珍	Tahiti	French Polynesia	18
8	Rosemary CHAN 陳曼莉	Toronto	Canada	23
9	Valerie H. LEE 李曉彤	San Francisco	USA	22
10	(Sherine SENG) 鍾雪蓮	Auckland	New Zealand	19
11	Michelle LOW 劉金燕	Singapore	Singapore	18
12	Lois WONG 黃樂怡	Victoria	Canada	21
13	(Lai-Suen CHAN) 陳麗璇	Brisbane	Australia	19
14	Alyna CHIEN 錢東媺	Chicago	USA	24
15	Chanintorn CHITLADA 陳麗雲	Bangkok	Thailand	22
16	Catherine MACABULOS 馬嘉寶	Manila	Philippines	19
17	Lily LEE 李莉莉	Edmonton	Canada	24
18	Karen LIN 林蘭芷	Taipei	Taiwan	23
19	Alyssa MAH 馬娉婷	Calgary	Canada	22
20	Weng-Si LEONG 梁穎詩	Macau	Macau	18
21	(Kit-Bing FOK) 霍潔冰	Johannesburg	South Africa	23

== Crossovers ==
Contestants who previously competed or will be competing at other international beauty pageants:

Miss World

- 1991: Taipei, Taiwan: Karen Lin
  (representing Republic of China)
