= Miss Chinese International Pageant 1997 =

- Date: January 26, 1997
- Presenters: Eric Tsang, Carol Cheng
- Venue: TVB City, Hong Kong
- Broadcaster: TVB
- Entrants: 19
- Placements: 5
- Winner: Monica Lo 盧淑儀; Toronto, Ontario Canada
- Congeniality: Wendy Giam; Kuala Lumpur, Malaysia

Miss Chinese International Pageant 1997 was held on January 26, 1997 in Hong Kong. The pageant was organized and broadcast by TVB in Hong Kong. Miss Chinese International 1996 Siew-Kee Cheng crowned Monica Lo of Toronto, Ontario, Canada as the winner.

== Pageant information ==
The slogan and theme to this year's pageant is "The Oriental Legend 1997"「東方神話1997. The Masters of Ceremonies were Eric Tsang and Carol Cheng.

== Results ==
| Placement | Contestant | City Represented | Country Represented |
|---|---|---|---|
| Miss Chinese International 1997 | Monica Lo 盧淑儀 | Toronto | Canada |
| 1st Runner-Up | San San Lee 李珊珊 | Hong Kong | Hong Kong |
| 2nd Runner-Up | Kulsatri Konjanawann 張庭瑋 | Bangkok | Thailand |
| Top 5 Finalists | Guiomar da Silva Pedruco 畢美琪; Mei-Shui Lien 連梅雪 | Macau; Taipei | Macau; Chinese Taipei |

=== Special awards ===
- Miss Friendship: Wendy Giam 嚴慧賢 (Kuala Lumpur)
- Miss Oriental Charm: Hannah Toh 卓海倫 (Singapore)

== Crossovers ==
Contestants who previously competed or will be competing at other international beauty pageants:

Miss World

- 1996: Macau : Guiomar da Silva Pedruco

Miss Universe

- 1997: Hong Kong: San San Lee

Miss Tourism International

- 1997: Bangkok, Thailand: Kulsatri Konjanawann
  (representing Thailand) (Top 10)
