= Sherry Chen (actress) =

Chinese-Canadian actress

Sherry Chen, or Chen Shuang (Chinese: 陳爽; born June 21, 1983, in Harbin), is a Chinese-Canadian actress based in Hong Kong. She was the winner of Miss Chinese Toronto Pageant 2006 and Miss Chinese International Pageant 2007 Second Runner-Up. She acted in OL Supreme as Bak Mai which is her best known role, which was well received by audiences. She also acted many minor and supporting characters due to lack of Cantonese fluency.

She briefly took a break from her education as she believed her career was progressing smoothly at the time of her popular character and wanted to save money upon realizing that it was not possible for her to buy a residence in Hong Kong within two years with her income.

She is known for her good figure, which contributed to the popularity of her character. Upon reaching her thirties, the media praised her for keeping her figure well for so long. Later, she completed her degree to work with an airline company. Other work includes hosting Mandarin-language programs and part-time modelling and working as a manager for Cathay Pacific.

== Biography ==
She enjoys listening to classical music, reading, playing piano, cooking, and skiing. She graduated from Harbin High school. She studied economics at York University and the University of Toronto and obtained high marks and her degrees before competing in Miss Chinese Toronto. Prior to the pageant, she had competed in the Miss Chinese Cosmos (Toronto) Pageant but did not place. She is one of the most educated TVB artists, having completed and received education at several universities including Hong Kong University and Oxford University studying law, management, etc. While at the universities, she was well rounded and participated in many events. At the University of Toronto, she was the University of Toronto Chinese Students Association Vice Chairman and served on the University of Toronto Chinese Students Association and held a Chinese New Year party.

== Recognitions ==
- Year 2004, Chinese University Students Ambassador for Peace Competition-Winner (Traditional Chinese:中國大學生和平大使總決賽冠軍)
- Year 2005, Miss Chinese Cosmos (Toronto) Pageant - Finalist (Later judge in 2006)
- Year 2006,Miss Chinese Toronto Pageant- Winner
- Year 2007, Miss Chinese International Pageant- Second runner-up

== Filmography ==
Year	Name of Series	Role	Notes
2009	The Threshold of a Persona	Julie	
2010	OL Supreme	Bak Mai (白米)	
