= Christine Kuo =

Taiwanese-Canadian actress (born 1983)

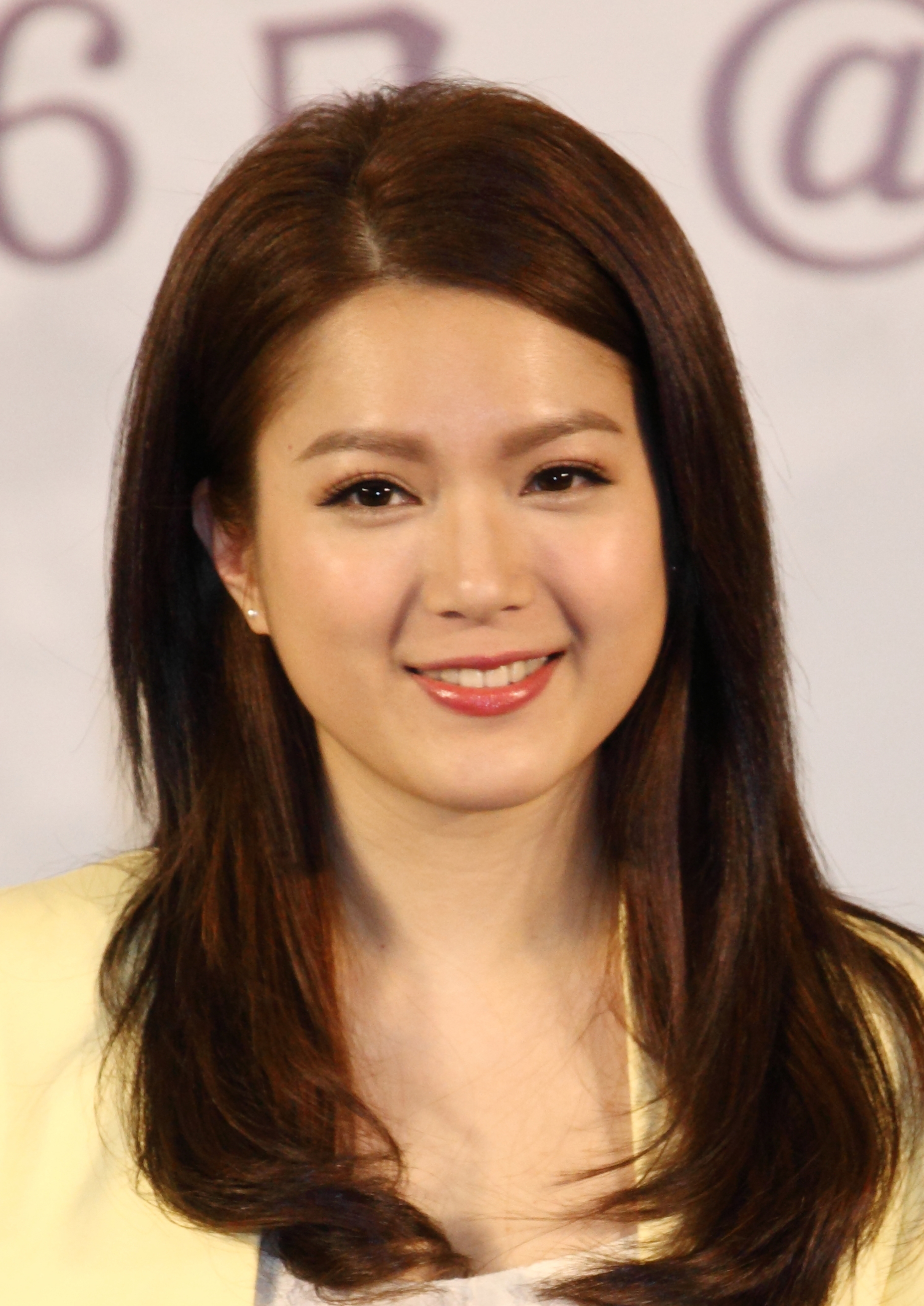
- Kuo in 2014
- Born: 11 July 1983 (age 43); Taichung, Taiwan
- Occupation: Actress
- Years active: 2008–present
- Spouse: William Luk (m. 2018; div. 2025)

Christine Kuo (Chinese: 苟芸慧; pinyin: Gǒu Yúnhuì; Wade–Giles: Kou^{1} Yün^{2}-hui^{4}; Jyutping: Gau2 Wan4 Wai6; born 11 July 1983) is a Taiwanese-Canadian actress based in Hong Kong. She was the winner of the Miss Chinese Toronto Pageant 2008 and Miss Chinese International Pageant 2009.

== Early life ==
Kuo grew up in Taichung, Taiwan. She attended Taichung Municipal Bei Tun Elementary School until moving with her family to Toronto, Canada at age 10. She majored in mathematics at University of Waterloo. Due to her father's business failure and cancer diagnosis, she transferred to study project management remotely at University of Calgary. She worked as a project manager during her studies.

== Career ==
She won four awards at the 2008 Miss Chinese Toronto Pageant: Miss Photogenic, Miss Fittest Posture, Miss Popularity and Miss Most Beautiful Hair. In January 2009, she represented Toronto to compete in the Miss Chinese International Pageant 2009 as a favorite contestant due to her awards and popularity. She was then awarded the Miss International Charm Award and later was crowned winner of Miss Chinese International 2009.

She signed a 6-year contract with TVB and moved from Toronto to Hong Kong to pursue a career in the entertainment industry.

She returned as a judge in the Miss Chinese Toronto Pageant 2009.

Currently, due to thyroid problems in recent years, her production has been reduced, and her workload has dropped significantly. At the end of 2015, Kuo originally decided to leave TVB after her contract expired. Later, after repeated attempts by TVB's Director of Production Resources, Virginia Lok Yee-ling, Kuo retained her for another year, and on the same day, she renewed her contract to resume work in November.

In October 2016, Kuo's contract with TVB officially expired. As she was once a frequent actor of TVB producer Lam Chi Wah, the film "Over Run Over" she completed after retiring from the screen also became her farewell work.

In 2017, she went to Milan as a guest editor to do interviews, street interviews, etc.

In 2018, she wore a wedding dress designed by designer Kev at her wedding. It attracted a lot of attention because it was the same color as the dress worn by Princess Belle in "Beauty and the Beast". Afterwards, some online media revealed that after Miss Kuo asked a designer to design a dress for her and received two wedding dresses for free, she not only did not promote the designer, but also revealed to friends in the industry that "if it weren't for me, no one would know about it." She even lied to the media that this was a wedding dress she designed, which greatly reduced her character and integrity.

2019 she was featured on Elle Hong Kong for the most beautiful bride-to-be and Cosmo magazine.

In 2025, she officially announced she comes back to stage.

In 2026, she attended Malaysia Weibo Cultural Exchange Night: A themed cultural exchange evening event hosted in Malaysia.

She was awarded Weibo Malaysia Film&Television Philanthropic Cultural Exchange Artist. She was the Miss Hong Kong Most Photogenic Judge: Serving as a judge for the "Most Photogenic Miss" segment of the Miss Hong Kong pageant. She also attended China International Fashion Week: Participating in related activities at China International Fashion Week (Invited by Ellassay and other brands to attend the show). She continued to support Hong Kong Uncle Donald's House x Hong Kong Human Milk Bank Charity Event: A charity event jointly organized by Uncle Donald's House (a charitable organization supporting families with sick children) and the Hong Kong Human Milk Bank. In August, AKK Probiotics Advertisement: Filming an advertisement for AKK probiotic products and become the official celebrity ambassador of the AKK product line. Same month, Ming Pao Weekly, Singdao，East week and Bashi de TV: A well-known Hong Kong magazine, typically involving interviews or photo shoots for covers and interior pages.

== Personal life ==
Christine Kuo was born and raised in Taichung, Taiwan in 1983. She attended Beitun Elementary School in Beitun District, Taichung City, and immigrated to Toronto, Canada with her family when she was ten years old.

== Filmography ==
=== Film ===
English Title	Original title	Year	Role	Notes
The Jade and the Pearl	翡翠明珠	2010	Princess Gou	
I Love Hong Kong	我愛HK開心萬歲	2011	secretary	Cameo
The Fortune Buddies	勁抽福祿壽	2011	Qi Hua Bakery salesperson	Cameo
I Love Hong Kong 2012	2012我愛HK 喜上加囍	2012	Siu Fa	Cameo
Natural Born Lovers	天生愛情狂	2012	Lin hui hsin	
Hardcore Comedy	重口味	2013	Tse Wing-yan	
White Man	愛神搭錯線	2013	Grace	
I Love You, You're Perfect, Now Change!	你咪理，我愛你	2019		
Happy520	《快樂520》	2020		

=== Television series ===
Title	Year	Role	Notes
Don Juan De Mercado	2010	Yeung Sin-wah	
The Mysteries of Love	2010	Pauline	Cameo Episode 25
Home Troopers	2010–11	Michelle Kwai Sin-yau	
The Life and Times of a Sentinel	2011	Kin-ching, the Fifth Princess Consort	
Super Snoops	2011	Chap Yau	
Forensic Heroes III	2011	Ann Cho Lai-mei	Episode 1
Daddy Good Deeds	2012	Waitress	Episode 1
Tiger Cubs	2012	Ting Wai-wai	Nominated — TVB Anniversary Award for Most Improved Female Artiste
Ghetto Justice II	2012	Lynette King Ling-lei	Nominated — TVB Anniversary Awards for Best Supporting Actress (Top 10); Nominated — TVB Anniversary Award for Most Improved Female Artiste
Friendly Fire	2012-2013	Bella	Episode 2
A Great Way to Care II	2013	Dr. Scarlett Chan Sze-ka	
Beauty at War	2013	Pakkiya Qianyue	
Always and Ever	2013	Princess Hing-sau	Episode 2-13 (11 episodes)
Tiger Cubs II	2014-2015	Ting Wai-wai	
Over Run Over	2016	Joyce	
Flying Tiger 2	2019	Yan Ting	

=== Music video appearances ===
- 2009: Leo Ku, 沒有腳的小鳥 (TVB version)
- 2010: Raymond Lam, 我們很好 (TVB version)

== Awards ==
- Next TV Awards 2013-Most Promising Female Artist
