= Miss Chinese International Pageant 2001 =

- Date: January 20, 2001
- Presenters: Carol Cheng, Vincent Kok
- Entertainment: Alan Tam, Elva Hsiao, Edison Chen, Ding Fei Fei
- Venue: TVB City, Hong Kong
- Broadcaster: TVB
- Entrants: 20
- Placements: 5
- Winner: Bernice Liu; Vancouver, Canada
- Congeniality: Hsin-Ting Chiang; Taipei, Chinese Taipei

Miss Chinese International Pageant 2001 was held on January 20, 2001 in Hong Kong. At the end of the pageant, Bernice Liu of Vancouver, British Columbia, Canada was crowned the 13th Miss Chinese International. This was the first victory for the Canadian city. Prior to this, Vancouver has never placed higher than 2nd runner up.

== Pageant information ==
The theme to this year's pageant is "The Gathering of Cosmopolitan Treasure, The Brightness of Eastern Pearl" 「名都瑰寶滙聚 東方明珠生輝」. The Masters of Ceremonies were Carol Cheng and Vincent Kok. Special performing guests were cantopop singers Alan Tam, Edison Chen, Ding Fei Fei and mandopop singer Elva Hsiao.

== Results ==
Placement	Contestant	City Represented	Country Represented
Miss Chinese International 2001	Bernice Liu 廖碧兒	Vancouver	Canada
1st Runner-Up	Jennifer Huang 黃以白	Montréal	Canada
2nd Runner-Up	Vivian Lau 劉慧蘊	Hong Kong	Hong Kong
Top 5 Finalists	Cassandra Hugh 丘嘉萍; Allysa Law 劉曉萍	Chicago; Kuala Lumpur	USA; Malaysia

=== Special awards ===
- Miss Friendship: Hsin-Ting Chiang 江欣婷 (Taipei)
- Miss Cosmopolitan: Bernice Liu 廖碧兒 (Vancouver)
- Miss Internet Goodwill: Mandy Chen 陳育嬬 (Brisbane)
- Miss Talent: Bernice Liu 廖碧兒 (Vancouver)

== Contestant list ==
No.	Contestant Name	Represented City	Represented Country	Age
1	Genevieve SIAO 蕭真妮	Manila	Philippines	21
2	Jennifer HUANG 黃以白	Montréal	Canada	18
3	Calista NG 黃寶麗	Singapore	Singapore	22
4	Valerie FOO 傅美儀	San Francisco	USA	25
5	Cissy WANG 汪詩詩	Toronto	Canada	19
6	Melissa LEONG 梁珊妮	Sydney	Australia	23
7	Vivian LAU 劉慧蘊	Hong Kong	Hong Kong	22
8	Bernice LIU 廖碧兒	Vancouver	Canada	22
9	Cassandra HUGH 丘嘉萍	Chicago	USA	23
10	Caroline VONZY 黃美玲	Tahiti	French Polynesia	18
11	Daisy LAM 林翠碧	Seattle	USA	23
12	Allysa LAW 劉曉萍	Kuala Lumpur	Malaysia	24
13	Nawanun ANOMA 林愛雯	Bangkok	Thailand	22
14	Hsin-Ting CHIANG 江欣婷	Taipei	Chinese Taipei	21
15	Amanda BOLL 保采芬	Melbourne	Australia	19
16	Lilly HUA 許莉莉	Calgary	Canada	19
17	Ming ZHAO 趙明	New York City	USA	19
18	Katy WANG 王媞	Los Angeles	USA	18
19	Pingguo ZHAN 詹萍果	Honolulu	USA	24
20	Mandy CHEN 陳育嬬	Brisbane	Australia	24

== Crossovers ==
Contestants who previously competed or will be competing at other international beauty pageants:

Miss Universe

- 2001: Taipei, Chinese Taipei: Hsin-Ting Chiang
  (representing Taiwan)

Miss International

- 2000: Taipei, Chinese Taipei: Hsin-Ting Chiang
  (representing Taiwan)

== Mandy Chen & Edison Chen scandal ==
The delegate representing Brisbane, Australia, (20) Mandy Chen 陳育嬬, became entangled in a photo scandal with one of the pageant's performers Edison Chen, when suspected nude pictures of Mandy Chen engaging in sexual acts, along with pictures of other Hong Kong female celebrities surfaced in early 2008. During the pageant, Edison Chen has stated that Mandy Chen is his favourite delegate. Mandy Chen has yet to comment on the incident.
