= Miss Chinese International Pageant 1996 =

- Date: January 27, 1996
- Presenters: Eric Tsang, Carol Cheng
- Venue: TV City, Hong Kong
- Broadcaster: TVB
- Entrants: 19
- Placements: 10
- Winner: Siew-Kee Cheng 鍾秀枝; Singapore
- Congeniality: Winnie Young; Hong Kong

Miss Chinese International Pageant 1996 was held on January 27, 1996, in Hong Kong. The pageant was organized and broadcast by TVB in Hong Kong. Miss Chinese International 1995 Hsiang-Lin Ku crowned Siew-Kee Cheng of Singapore as the winner.

== Pageant information ==
The slogan and theme to this year's pageant is "The Elegance of Yesteryears' Stars, The Vitality of Tonight's Delegates" 「昔日明星風釆 今夕佳麗風姿」. The Masters of Ceremonies were Eric Tsang, Carol Cheng.

== Results ==
Placement	Contestant	City Represented	Country Represented
Miss Chinese International 1996	Siew-Kee Cheng 鍾秀枝	Singapore	Singapore
1st Runner-Up	Melissa Ng 吳美珩	San Francisco	USA
2nd Runner-Up	~~Amy Chung 鍾慧儀~~ (Dethroned in 1999 - see below)	New York City	USA
Top 5 Finalists	Tsun-Tsun Hsu 許純純; Kaimook Pindokmai 陳珍珠	Taipei; Bangkok	Chinese Taipei; Thailand
Top 10 Finalists	Winnie Young 楊婉儀; Patsy Poon 潘美詩; S. Chalon 張少婷; Carol Lee 李笑美; Mercedes Yao 姚蔚珺	Hong Kong; Toronto; Tahiti; Kuala Lumpur; Los Angeles	Hong Kong; Canada; French Polynesia; Malaysia; USA

=== Special awards ===
- Miss Friendship: Winnie Young 楊婉儀 (Hong Kong)
- Miss Glamour: Kaimook Pindokmai 陳珍珠 (Bangkok)

== Amy Chung dethroning ==
In 1999, it was discovered that second runner-up Amy Chung of New York had an outstanding warrant for her arrest in USA as she left the country to enter the pageant while on probation stemming from a credit card fraud conviction. Chung had also lied about her academic credentials, claiming to have a master's degree from Harvard University when she only has taken courses from Harvard Extension School.

When news first leaked, Chung denied all rumours and went into hiding from the Hong Kong media, performing in mainland China. However, she was summoned to TVB headquarters two weeks later and subsequently admitted to both her conviction and the embellishment of her educational records. As such, Chung was stripped of her title of Miss Chinese International 1996 Second Runner-Up and had her artiste contract with TVB terminated. Chung then returned to the US and turned herself in, where she served a 2-year prison term for her parole violation. Her title of second runner-up has been left vacant since.

== Crossovers ==
Contestants who previously competed or will be competing at other international beauty pageants:

Miss World

- 1995: Macau : Geraldina Madeira da Silva Pedruco
- 1995: Taipei, Chinese Taipei: Hsu Chun-Chun
  (representing Taiwan)
