= Miss Hong Kong Pageant =

Beauty contest

- 香港小姐競選
- Abbreviation: MHK, MSHK, MISSHK, 港姐
- Formation: 1946; 80 years ago (Original); 1972; 54 years ago (TVB acquirement)
- Type: Beauty pageant
- Purpose: Annual beauty pageant to crown the best representative of Hong Kong beauty
- Headquarters: TVB City
- Location: Hong Kong
- Members: Miss Universe; Original (1952―1972); TVB (1973―2000); Kimmy Low (2024); Phoebe Chu (2025―Present); Miss World; Original (1959); TVB (1973―1989, 1992―2015, 2017); Miss International; Original (1967―1969); TVB (1975―2015); Miss Chinese International; (1988―2019)
- Official language: Hong Kong Cantonese (official); Mandarin, Hong Kong English (minor)
- Current title holder: Bernice Yuen (Miss Hong Kong 2026)
- Parent organization: TVB
- Website: misshk.tvb.com

Miss Hong Kong Pageant (Chinese: 香港小姐競選), or Miss HK (港姐) for short, is an annual Hong Kong-based beauty pageant organised by local Hong Kong television station, TVB. The pageant was established in 1946, and acquired by TVB in 1973. It is one of the oldest pageants in the world. The reigning Miss Hong Kong is Bernice Yuen, winner of the 2026 pageant.

== Regulations ==
=== Recruitment ===
All participants have to have a Hong Kong ID or be born in Hong Kong (with a valid birth certificate). The age requirement is 17–27 since 2011, though the upper age was previously up to 25. While there has been other Miss Hong Kong pageants in prior years producing notable titleholders such as Judy Dan (1952), Virginia June Lee (1954), Michelle Mok (1958), Laura da Costa (1967), Mabel Hawkett (1970) and Shirley Yu (1974, contest organized by Miss Pearl of the Orient Company and overlapping with TVB's), the current annual TVB pageant began in 1973. Apart from the top prize winner, first runner-up and second runner-up prizes, the pageant also has other consolation prizes that vary slightly from year to year. Many Miss Hong Kong contestants have gone on to have movie careers as it is quite typical for the top contestants to garner television contracts from TVB.

- Overseas Recruitment: Applications are available in New York City, Los Angeles, San Francisco, any TVB rental store in the US, Fairchild TV station, Ontario, Richmond, British Columbia, and any TVB rental store in Canada. Delegates have to send in their applications before the deadline. TVB, organisers of the pageant travel to cities in the US and Canada. They include: Los Angeles, San Francisco, Toronto, and Vancouver. TVB would choose a certain amount of delegates to interview and would call them to interview. Besides personal interviews, delegates have to wear swimsuits chosen by themselves and walk around in it. Delegates are chosen and return to Hong Kong in late May to compete.
- Local Recruitment: Hong Kong. Applications are available in Hong Kong, Australia, New Zealand, Singapore, United Kingdom, and Europe. Delegates have to send in their applications before the deadline. Weeks later, primary and secondary interviews are conducted. Top interviewed finalists are chosen and they record a reality TV show (like 2006) to choose the deserving semifinalists to compete. They joined the overseas delegates to form the top event finalists.

The pageant is traditionally televised into two events, although this is not always necessarily the case in recent years. First, a preliminary event is held where 12 finalists are selected from a group of candidates, the number of which is usually around 20–25 (with 30 being the maximum). Then a final event is held, culminating in the announcement of the winner and the first and second runners-up from the 12 finalists. In some years, the field is narrowed down to a final five, from which the runners-up and winner are chosen. Often several contestants dropped out of the pageant before the televised preliminary, thus there would be a candidate with #30 assigned to her, but only 25 or so contestants.

== Titleholders ==
Year	Miss HK	Runners-up	Special awards
1946	Lee Lan 李蘭	1st Runner-up : 白光 2nd Runner-up : 潘江楓	No awards given
1947	Ng Dan Fung 吳丹鳳	1st Runner-up : 陳安妮 2nd Runner-up : 朱麗英, 白麗蓮	No awards given
1948	Sima Yin 司馬音	1st Runner-up : 周虹 2nd Runner-up : 費姿	No awards given
1952	Judy Dan 但茱迪	1st Runner-up : 李懿碧 2nd Runner-up : 李美梅	No awards given
1954	Virginia June Lee 李慧珍	1st Runner-up : 桑蓮宜 2nd Runner-up : 張慧珠	No awards given
1959	Michelle Mok Ping-Ching 莫萍貞	1st Runner-up : 羅懿如 2nd Runner-up : 王麗貞	No awards given
1960	Vivian Cheung 張慧雲	1st Runner-up : 葛愛賢 2nd Runner-up : 李德	No awards given
1962	Shirley Pong 龐碧光	1st Runner-up : 陳蘭施 2nd Runner-up : 文婉玲	No awards given
1964	Mary Bai 白紫薇	1st Runner-up 苗嘉麗 2nd Runner-up 左迪拉莉	No awards given
1965	Joy Drake 杜約克	1st Runner-up 趙莉莉 2nd Runner-up Laura Arminda Da Costa Roque 羅娜	No awards given
1966	Gisella Ma Ka-Wai	1st Runner-up 卜文絢 2nd Runner-up 許真娜	No awards given
1967	Laura Arminda Da Costa Roque 羅娜	1st Runner-up 金麗達 2nd Runner-up 程玲玉	No awards given
1968	Tammy Yung 翁茵茵	1st Runner-up 張潔冰 2nd Runner-up 呂玲玲	Hong Kong Princess (香港公主) : Louise Lee
1969	Christine Tam Mei-Mei 譚美美	1st Runner-up 劉海倫 2nd Runner-up Cecile McSmith 麥瑪莉	No awards given
1970	Mabel Hawkett 何秀汶	1st Runner-up 周雪雯 2nd Runner-up 鍾歌莉亞	No awards given
1972	Rita Leung Suet-Ling 梁雪玲	1st Runner-up 蘇倩雯 2nd Runner-up 吳慧君	No awards given
1973	Elanie Sung 孫泳恩	1st Runner-up Judy Yung 容朱迪 2nd Runner-up Ethel Lau 劉慧德	No awards given
1974	Jojo Cheung 張文瑛	1st Runner-up Judith Dirkin 杜茱迪 2nd Runner-up Peggy Lee 李錦文	No awards given
1975	Mary Cheung	1st Runner-up Teresa Chu 朱翠娟 2nd Runner-up Conny Kwan 關淑芬	Miss Photogenic : Lucia Szeto 司徒靈芝 Miss Friendship : Teresa Chu 朱翠娟
1976	Rowena Lam 林良蕙	1st Runner-up Christine Leung 梁靜文 2nd Runner-up Margaret Tsui 徐美玲	Miss Photogenic : Cora Miao Miss Friendship : Karen Ng 吳淑明
1977	Loletta Chu	1st Runner-up Shui Yung Lui 呂瑞容 2nd Runner-up Dorothy Yu 余綺霞	Miss Photogenic : Loletta Chu Miss Friendship : Velma Talbot 施家怡
1978	Winnie Chan 陳文玉	1st Runner-up Faustina Lin 連惠玲 2nd Runner-up Regina Tsang 曾慶瑜	Miss Photogenic Lily Cheung 張夢夏 Miss Friendship Sylvia Ip 葉妙容
1979	Olivia Cheng 鄭文雅	1st Runner-up Mary Ng 吳美麗 2nd Runner-up Maria Chung 鍾慧冰	Miss Photogenic Olivia Cheng 鄭文雅 Miss Friendship Monita Kuan 管玉琴
1980	Wanda Tai 戴月娥	1st Runner-up Julia Chan 陳鳳芝 2nd Runner-up Janet Wong 黃靜	Miss Photogenic Wanda Tai 戴月娥 Miss Friendship Elanie Cheung 張淑玲
1981	Irene Lo 勞錦嫦	1st Runner-up Winnie Chin 錢慧儀 2nd Runner-up Deborah Moore 狄寶娜摩亞	Miss Photogenic Freda Leung 梁仲芬 Miss Friendship Irene Lo 勞錦嫦
1982	Angeline Leung 梁韻蕊	1st Runner-up Cally Kwong 鄺美雲 2nd Runner-up Isabella Kau 寇鴻萍	Miss Photogenic Wendy Ha 夏淑玲 Miss Friendship Judy Hon 韓燕虹
1983	Cher Yeung 楊雪儀	1st Runner-up Maggie Cheung 張曼玉 2nd Runner-up Eve Lee 李月芙	Miss Photogenic Maggie Cheung 張曼玉 Miss Friendship Sylvia Chung 鍾子綸
1984	Joyce Godenzi 高麗虹	1st Runner-up Margaret Ma 馬倩衡 2nd Runner-up Joan Tong 唐麗球	Miss Photogenic Joyce Godenzi 高麗虹 Miss Friendship Mimi Lau 劉淑華
1985	Shallin Tse 謝寧	1st Runner-up Aleen Lo 羅錦如 2nd Runner-up Ellen Wong 王愛倫	Miss Photogenic Frances Lau 劉碧儀 Miss Friendship Ivy Sung 宋愛儀
1986	Robin Lee 李美珊	1st Runner-up May Ng 吳婉芳 2nd Runner-up Patty Ngai 倪萱彤	Miss Photogenic May Ng 吳婉芳 Miss Friendship Ann Choy 蔡惠娟
1987	Pauline Yeung 楊寶玲	1st Runner-up Elizabeth Lee 李美鳳 2nd Runner-up Wing Lam 林穎嫺	Miss Photogenic Elizabeth Lee 李美鳳 Miss Friendship Betty Cheung 張鳳妮 Miss International Goodwill Pauline Yeung 楊寶玲
1988	Michelle Reis 李嘉欣	1st Runner-up Sheila Chan 陳淑蘭 2nd Runner-up Cynthia Cheung 張郁蕾	Miss Photogenic Sheila Chin 陳淑蘭 Miss Friendship Betty Yau 丘碧瑜 Miss International Goodwill Michelle Reis 李嘉欣
1989	Monica Chan 陳法蓉	1st Runner-up Donna Chu 朱潔儀 2nd Runner-up Isabel Leung 梁佩瑚	Miss Photogenic Wanda Yung 翁慧德 Miss Friendship Lorell Li 李綺霞 Miss International Goodwill Monica Chan 陳法蓉
1990	Anita Yuen 袁詠儀	1st Runner-up Helen Yung 翁杏蘭 2nd Runner-up Noel Leung 梁小冰	Miss Photogenic Anita Yuen 袁詠儀 Miss International Goodwill Helen Yung 翁杏蘭
1991	Amy Kwok 郭藹明	1st Runner-up Valerie Chow 周嘉玲 2nd Runner-up Ada Choi 蔡少芬	Miss Photogenic Amy Fan 樊亦敏 Miss Friendship Maur Yeung 楊凱斯 Miss International Goodwill Amy Kwok 郭藹明
1992	Emily Lo 盧淑儀	1st Runner-up Patsy Lau 劉殷伶 2nd Runner-up Shirley Cheung 張雪玲	Miss Photogenic Emily Lo 盧淑儀 Miss Friendship Carol Lee 李秋林 Miss International Goodwill Patsy Lau 劉殷伶
1993	Hoyan Mok 莫可欣	1st Runner-up May Lam 林麗薇 2nd Runner-up Middy Yu 余少寶	Miss Press Kenix Kwok 郭可盈 Miss International Goodwill Christina Lau 劉飛飛
1994	Halina Tam 譚小環	1st Runner-up Annamarie Wood 活麗明 2nd Runner-up Theresa Lee 李綺紅	Miss Photogenic Natalie Wong 黃𨥈瑩 Miss Press Theresa Lee 李綺紅 Miss International Goodwill Dorothy Ng 吳素珊
1995	Winnie Young 楊婉儀	1st Runner-up Sofie Rahman 李嘉慧 2nd Runner-up Shirley Chau 周婉儀	Miss Photogenic Sofie Rahman 李嘉慧 Miss Press Shirley Chau 周婉儀 Miss International Goodwill Shirley Chau 周婉儀
1996	Lee San-san 李珊珊	1st Runner-up Chillie Poon 潘芝莉 2nd Runner-up Fiona Yuen 袁彩雲	Miss Photogenic San San Lee 李珊珊 Miss Press San San Lee 李珊珊 Miss International Goodwill Fiona Yuen 袁彩雲
1997	Virginia Yung 翁嘉穗	1st Runner-up Vivian Lee 李明慧 2nd Runner-up Charmaine Sheh 佘詩曼	Miss Photogenic Virginia Yung 翁嘉穗 Miss International Goodwill Vivian Lee 李明慧
1998	Anne Heung 向海嵐	1st Runner-up Jessie Chiu 趙翠儀 2nd Runner-up Natalie Ng 吳文忻	Miss Photogenic Anne Heung 向海嵐 Miss International Goodwill Josephine Yan 殷莉
1999	Sonija Kwok 郭羨妮	1st Runner-up Marsha Yuan 原子鏸 2nd Runner-up Myolie Wu 胡杏兒	Miss Photogenic Sonija Kwok 郭羨妮 Miss International Goodwill Sonija Kwok 郭羨妮
2000	Vivian Lau 劉慧蘊	1st Runner-up Margaret Kan 簡佩堅 2nd Runner-up Maree Lau 劉嘉慧	Miss Photogenic Vivian Lau 劉慧蘊 Miss International Goodwill Vivian Lau 劉慧蘊
2001	Shirley Yeung 楊思琦	1st Runner-up Gigi Chung 鍾沛枝 2nd Runner-up Heidi Chu 朱凱婷	Miss Photogenic Shirley Yeung 楊思琦 Miss International Goodwill Heidi Chu 朱凱婷
2002	Tiffany Lam 林敏俐	1st Runner-up Victoria Jane Jolly 左慧琪 2nd Runner-up Cathy Wu 胡家惠	Miss Photogenic Cerina Da Graca 嘉碧儀 Miss Talent Rubyanne Choi 蔡潔雯 Miss International Goodwill Tiffany Lam 林敏俐
2003	Mandy Cho 曹敏莉	1st Runner-up Rabee'a Yeung 楊洛婷 2nd Runner-up Priscilla Chi 戚黛黛	Miss Photogenic, Miss Talent Selena Li 李詩韻 Miss International Goodwill Mandy Cho 曹敏莉
2004	Kate Tsui 徐子珊	1st Runner-up Queenie Chu 朱慧敏 2nd Runner-up Sze Sze Fu 符思思	Miss Photogenic Kate Tsui 徐子珊 Miss International Goodwill Kate Tsui 徐子珊
2005	Tracy Ip 葉翠翠	1st Runner-up Sharon Luk 陸詩韻 2nd Runner-up Carrie Lam 林莉	Miss Photogenic Shermon Tang 鄧上文 Miss International Goodwill Natalle Khor 許佩琪
2006	Aimee Chan 陳茵媺	1st Runner-up Janet Chow 周家蔚 2nd Runner-up Koni Lui 呂慧儀	Miss Photogenic Janet Chow 周家蔚 Miss International Goodwill Aimee Chan 陳茵媺
2007	Kayi Cheung 張嘉兒	1st Runner-up Grace Wong 王君馨 2nd Runner-up Lorretta Chow 周美欣	Miss Photogenic Grace Wong 王君馨 Miss International Goodwill Grace Wong 王君馨
2008	Edelweiss Cheung 張舒雅	1st Runner-up Skye Chan 陳倩揚 2nd Runner-up Sire Ma 馬賽	Miss Photogenic Sire Ma 馬賽 Miss International Goodwill Skye Chan 陳倩揚
2009	Sandy Lau 劉倩婷	1st Runner-up Germaine Lee 李姿敏 2nd Runner-up Mizuni Hung 熊穎詩	Miss Photogenic Candy Yuen 袁嘉敏 Miss International Goodwill Carly Wong 黃嘉麗
2010	Toby Chan 陳庭欣	1st Runner-up Sammi Cheung 張秀文 2nd Runner-up Lisa Ch'ng 莊思明	Miss Photogenic Crystal Li 李雪瑩 Miss International Goodwill Toby Chan 陳庭欣
2011	Rebecca Zhu 朱晨麗	1st Runner-up Hyman Chu 朱希敏 2nd Runner-up Whitney Hui 許亦妮	Miss Photogenic Whitney Hui 許亦妮 Miss International Goodwill Nicole Leung 梁麗翹
2012	Carat Cheung 張名雅	1st Runner-up Jacqueline Wong 黃心穎 2nd Runner-up Tracy Chu 朱千雪	Miss Photogenic Jennifer Shum 岑杏賢 Miss International Goodwill Carat Cheung 張名雅
2013	Grace Chan 陳凱琳	1st Runner-up Sisley Choi 蔡思貝 2nd Runner-up Moon Lau 劉佩玥	Miss Photogenic Grace Chan 陳凱琳 Miss Friendship Tammy Ou-Yang 歐陽巧瑩
2014	Veronica Shiu 邵珮詩	1st Runner-up Erin Wong 王卓淇 2nd Runner-up Katherine Ho 何艷娟	Miss Photogenic Veronica Shiu 邵珮詩 Miss Friendship Veronica Shiu 邵珮詩
2015	Louisa Mak 麥明詩	1st Runner-up Ada Pong 龐卓欣 2nd Runner-up Karmen Kwok 郭嘉文	Miss Photogenic Louisa Mak 麥明詩 Miss Friendship Iris Lam 林凱恩
2016	Crystal Fung 馮盈盈	1st Runner-up Tiffany Lau 劉穎鏇 2nd Runner-up Bonnie Chan 陳雅思	Miss Photogenic Tiffany Lau 劉穎鏇 Miss Friendship Bowie Cheung 張寶兒
2017	Juliette Louie 雷莊𠒇	1st Runner-up Regina Ho 何依婷 2nd Runner-up Emily Wong 黃瑋琦	Miss Photogenic Juliette Louie 雷莊𠒇 Miss Big Big Channel Boanne Cheung 張寶欣
2018	Hera Chan 陳曉華	1st Runner-up Amber Tang 鄧卓殷 2nd Runner-up Sara Ting 丁子田	Miss Photogenic Amber Tang 鄧卓殷 Miss Friendship Claudia Chan 陳靜堯
2019	Carmaney Wong 黃嘉雯	1st Runner-up Fei Wong 王菲 2nd Runner-up Kelly Gu 古佩玲	Miss Photogenic Fei Wong 王菲 Miss Friendship Blossom Chan 陳熙蕊
2020	Lisa-Marie Tse 謝嘉怡	1st Runner-up Celina Harto 陳楨怡 2nd Runner-up Rosita Kwok 郭柏妍	Miss Photogenic Lisa-Marie Tse 謝嘉怡 Miss Friendship Maisie Kwong 鄺美璇
2021	Sabina Mendes de Assunção 宋宛穎	1st Runner-up : Carina Leung 梁凱晴 2nd Runner-up : Kristy Shaw 邵初	Miss Photogenic : Penny Yeung 楊培琳 Miss Friendship : Kristy Shaw 邵初
2022	Denice Lam 林鈺洧	1st Runner-up : Cecca Xu 許子萱 2nd Runner-up : Joey Leung 梁超怡	Miss Photogenic : Joey Leung 梁超怡 Miss Friendship : Sharon Ying 邢慧敏 Miss International Goodwill : Cecca Xu 許子萱
2023	Hilary Chong 莊子璇	1st Runner-up : Lynn Wang 王怡然 2nd Runner-up : Lovelle Wang 王敏慈	Miss Photogenic : Lynn Wang 王怡然 Miss Friendship: Jenny Jiang 姜依寧
2024	Ellyn Ngai 倪樂琳	1st Runner-up : Emily Leung 梁嘉莹 2nd Runner-up : Amina Yeung 楊梓瑤	Miss Photogenic : Emily Leung 梁嘉莹 Miss Friendship : Candice Wong 王汛文
2025	Stacey Chan 陳詠詩	1st Runner-up : Angela Stanton 施宇琪 2nd Runner-up : Jane Yuan 袁文靜	Miss Photogenic : Victoria Lee 李尹嫣 Miss Friendship : Victoria Lee 李尹嫣
2026	Bernice Yuen 袁絲珩	1st Runner-up : Ada Tang 鄧匡閔 2nd Runner-up : Scarlett Li 李澤欣	Miss Photogenic : Scarlett Li 李澤欣 Miss Friendship : Chorie Li 李澄晴
2027		1st Runner-up : 2nd Runner-up :	Miss Photogenic : Miss Friendship :
2028		1st Runner-up : 2nd Runner-up :	Miss Photogenic : Miss Friendship :

== Overseas contestant awards list ==
Starting from 1991, the Miss Hong Kong pageant greets delegates from overseas. They include Toronto, Vancouver, New York, Los Angeles, Seattle, and San Francisco. Local contestants coming from Malaysia, Australia, New Zealand, London, and more enter at Hong Kong. The overseas delegates wait for the notification of their regional sponsors of TVB and if they are chosen, they fly to Hong Kong to compete. The following is a record of overseas delegates' performance at Miss Hong Kong.

- 1991 – 7. Amy Kwok 郭藹明 (Los Angeles)
  - Winner
  - Miss International Goodwill
  - Miss Humorous Conversation
- 1991 – 13. Maur Yeung 楊凱斯 (Los Angeles)
  - Miss Congeniality
- 1992 – 8. Patsy Lau 劉殷伶 (Los Angeles)
  - 1st runner-up
  - Miss International Goodwill
- 1992 – 14. Carol Lee 李秋林 (Los Angeles)
  - Miss Congeniality
- 1993 – 20. Christina Lau 劉飛飛 (Los Angeles)
  - Miss International Goodwill
- 1994 – 18. Dorothy Ng 吳素珊 (Los Angeles)
  - Miss International Goodwill
- 1995 – 12. Winnie Young 楊婉儀 (San Francisco)
  - Winner
  - Most Standard Figure Award
- 1997 – 2. Virginia Yung 翁嘉穗 (Vancouver)
  - Winner
  - Miss Photogenic
  - Miss Oriental Charm
  - Miss Cosmopolitan
- 1997 – 12. Vivian Lee 李明慧 (Vancouver)
  - 1st runner-up
  - Miss International Goodwill
- 1998 – 20. Anne Heung 向海嵐 (Vancouver)
  - Winner
  - Miss Photogenic
  - Global Beauty Award
  - Miss Hospitality
- 1998 – 14. Josephine Yan 殷莉 (Los Angeles)
  - Miss International Goodwill
- 1999 – 12. Sonija Kwok 郭羨妮 (Vancouver)
  - Winner
  - Miss Photogenic
  - Miss International Goodwill
  - Miss Millennium Wisdom
- 1999 – 15. Cindy Wong 王倩 (Los Angeles)
  - Miss Beautiful Legs
- 2000 – 11. Vivian Lau 劉慧蘊 (Vancouver)
  - Winner
  - Miss Photogenic
  - Miss International Goodwill
  - Miss Millennium Charm
- 2000 – 17. Margaret Kan 簡佩堅 (Toronto)
  - First runner-up
- 2000 – 5. Maree Lau 劉嘉慧 (Sydney)
  - Second runner-up
- 2002 – 11. Tiffany Lam 林敏俐 (San Francisco)
  - Winner
  - Miss International Goodwill
  - Miss New Generational Beauty
- 2002 – 20.Cerina Da Graça 嘉碧儀 (Phoenix)
  - Miss Photogenic
  - Breakthrough Natural Skin Award
  - Slimming Beauty Award
- 2003 – 2. Mandy Cho 曹敏莉 (San Francisco)
  - Winner
  - Miss International Goodwill
  - Miss Swimsuit Charm
  - Diamond Skin Award
  - Perfect Group
- 2003 – 11. Rabee'a Yeung 楊洛婷 (Vancouver)
  - 1st runner-up
  - Tourism Ambassador Award
- 2003 – 18. Selena Li 李詩韻 (Toronto)
  - Miss Photogenic
  - Miss Talent
- 2004 – 1. Queenie Chu 朱慧敏 (Seattle)
  - 1st runner-up
  - Tourism Ambassador Award
- 2006 – 13. Aimee Chan 陳茵媺 (Toronto)
  - Winner
  - Miss International Goodwill
  - Audience Favourite
- 2006 – 15. Janet Chow 周家蔚(Toronto)
  - 1st runner-up
  - Miss Photogenic
- 2007 – 3. Kayi Cheung 張嘉兒 (Vancouver)
  - Winner
  - Miss Vitality Ambassador
- 2007 – 9. Grace Wong 王君馨 (New York City)
  - 1st runner-up
  - Miss Photogenic
  - Miss International Goodwill.
- 2007 – 7. Lorretta Chow 周美欣 (Vancouver)
  - 2nd runner-up
  - Most Attractive Legs Award
- 2008 – 7. Hilda Leung 梁雅琳 (Toronto)
  - Miss Trendy Vision
- 2009 – 10. Germaine Li 李姿敏 (New York City)
  - 1st runner-up
- 2009 – 8. Mizuni Hung 熊穎詩 (Vancouver)
  - 2nd runner-up
  - Miss Trendy Vision
- 2010 – 9. Crystal Li 李雪瑩 (London)
  - Miss Photogenic
- 2011 – 14. Hymen Chu 朱希敏 (Toronto)
  - 1st runner-up
- 2011 – 3. Whitney Hui 許亦妮 (London)
  - 2nd runner-up
  - Miss Photogenic
- 2012 – Carat Cheung 張名雅 (Vancouver)
  - Winner
  - Aviation Ambassador
  - Miss International Goodwill
- 2012 – Jacqueline Wong 黃心穎 (Vancouver)
  - 1st runner up
- 2012 – Tracy Chu 朱千雪 (Vancouver)
  - 2nd runner up
- 2013 – 17. Grace Chan 陳凱琳 (Vancouver)
  - Winner
  - Miss Photogenic
- 2014 – 15. Veronica Shiu 邵珮詩 (Vancouver)
  - Winner
  - Miss Photogenic
  - Miss Friendship
- 2016 – 2. Tiffany Lau 劉穎璇 (Los Angeles)
  - 1st Runner up
  - Miss Photogenic
- 2016 – 7. Bonnie Chan 陳雅思 (Toronto)
  - 2nd Runner up
- 2017 – 5. Juliette Louie 雷莊𠒇 (Edmonton)
  - Winner
  - Miss Photogenic
- 2017 – 4. Emily Wong 黃瑋琦 (Miami)
  - 2nd Runner up
- 2018 – 7. Sara Ting 丁子田 (Chicago)
  - 2nd Runner up
- 2018 – 8. Claudia Chan 陳靜堯 (Auckland)
  - Miss Friendship
- 2019 – 6. Blossom Chan 陳熙蕊 (Brisbane)
  - Miss Friendship
- 2020 – 8. Lisa Tse 謝嘉怡 (Scotland)
  - Winner
  - Miss Photogenic
- 2022 - 4. Cecca Xu 許子萱 (New York City)
  - 1st Runner Up
  - Miss International Goodwill
- 2022 - 14.Joey Leung 梁超怡 (Los Angeles)
  - 2nd Runner Up
  - Miss Photogenic

Vancouver has the most Miss Hong Kong winners from the overseas. They had a record of four consecutive winners from 1997 to 2000, and three consecutive winners from 2012 to 2014. In 2012, the top 3 delegates were all from Vancouver. Even though the 2007 pageant had the top 3 all from the US and Canada but Grace Wong and Lorretta Chow travelled to Hong Kong to compete in the pageant, so they are recognised by TVB to be local delegates not overseas delegates. They did however come from overseas.

== Hong Kong beauty queens at Grand slam beauty pageants ==
=== Miss Universe Hong Kong ===
- : Declared as Winner
- : Ended as runner-up or top 5/6 qualification
- : Ended as one of the finalists or semifinalists
- : Ended as special awards winner

Year	Miss Universe HK	1st Runner-up	2nd Runner-up
2024	Joanne Rhodes 姚祖恩	Yan Kiu 周煒蕎 (甄蕎)	Juliette Louie 雷莊𠒇
2025	Lizzie Li 李詩逸	Michelle Young 楊家倩	Esther Tam 譚千晴
2026	Jennifer (Jen) Zhou 周婷	Alexis Leung 梁藝齡	Angeline Leung 梁聖童

- In 2001, TVB lost the franchise for Miss Universe.
- Beginning in 2024, Hong Kong was allowed to compete in Miss Universe after many years of being disallowed by MUO, due to area status, "SAR of China".

Year	Miss Universe HK	Placement at Miss Hong Kong	Placement at Miss Universe	Special awards	Notes
Lee Choi Fet directorship — a franchise holder to Miss Universe between 1952―1972
1952	Judy Dan 但茱迪	WINNER in 1952	3rd Runner-up		
Did not compete in 1953
1954	Virginia June Lee 李慧珍	WINNER in 1954	2nd Runner-up		
Did not compete between 1955―1959
1960	Vivian Cheung 張慧雲	WINNER in 1960	Unplaced		
Did not compete in 1961
1962	Shirley Pong 龐碧光	WINNER in 1962	Unplaced		
Did not compete in 1963
1964	Mary Bai 白紫薇	WINNER in 1964	Unplaced		
1965	Joy Drake 杜約克	WINNER in 1965	Unplaced		
Did not compete in 1966
1967	Laura Arminda Da Costa Roque 羅娜	WINNER in 1967	Top 15		
1968	Tammy Yung 翁茵茵	WINNER in 1968	Unplaced		
1969	Christine Tam Mei-Mei 譚美美	WINNER in 1969	Unplaced		
1970	Mabel Hawkett 何秀汶	WINNER in 1970	Top 15		
Did not compete in 1971
1972	Rita Leung Suet-Ling 梁雪玲	WINNER in 1972	Unplaced		
TVB directorship — a franchise holder to Miss Universe between 1973―2000
1973	Elaine Sung 孫泳恩	WINNER in 1973	Unplaced		
1974	Jojo Cheung 張文瑛	WINNER in 1964	Unplaced		
1975	Mary Cheung 張瑪莉	WINNER in 1965	Unplaced		
1976	Rowena Lam 林良蕙	WINNER in 1976	Top 12		In 1976, HK was the official venue of Miss Universe 1976. Rina Messinger won the title at Lee Theatre, Hong Kong.
1977	Loletta Chu 朱玲玲	WINNER in 1977	Unplaced		
1978	Winnie Chan 陳文玉	WINNER in 1978	Unplaced		
1979	Olivia Cheng 鄭文雅	WINNER in 1979	Unplaced		
1980	Wanda Tai 戴月娥	WINNER in 1980	Unplaced		
1981	Irene Lo 勞錦嫦	WINNER in 1981	Unplaced		
1982	Angeline Leung 梁韻蕊	WINNER in 1982	Unplaced		
1983	Cher Yeung 楊雪儀	WINNER in 1983	Unplaced		
1984	Joyce Godenzi 高麗虹	WINNER in 1984	Unplaced	Best National Costume (3rd placed)	
1985	Shallin Tse 謝寧	WINNER in 1985	Unplaced		
1986	Robin Lee 李美珊	WINNER in 1986	Unplaced		
1987	Lily Chung 鍾淑惠	WINNER (Miss Universe Hong Kong 1987)	Unplaced		Lily was the only Hong Kong representative selected by TVB who did not come from the Miss Hong Kong pageant. Instead, she was chosen through a different pageant held due to the switch in the timeframe of the Miss Universe and Miss Hong Kong pageants.
1988	Pauline Yeung 楊寶玲	WINNER in 1987	4th Runner-up		From this year on, the representative of Miss Hong Kong compete in the Miss Universe pageant a year later. The Miss HK winner returned to compete at Miss Universe competition.
1989	Cynthia Cheung 張郁蕾	2nd RUNNER-UP in 1988	Unplaced		Due to health matters, the main winner, Michelle Reis, Miss Hong Kong 1988 quit from the Miss Universe 1989.
1990	Monica Chan 陳法蓉	WINNER in 1989	Unplaced (23rd placed)		The placement score was determined by the Miss Universe calculation system, based on judges' scores throughout the broadcast.
1991	Anita Yuen 袁詠儀	WINNER in 1990	Unplaced (60th placed)		
1992	Amy Kwok 郭藹明	WINNER in 1991	Did not compete		Kwok was disqualified because she held United States citizenship.
1993	Emily Lo 盧淑儀	WINNER in 1992	Unplaced (49th placed)		
1994	Hoyan Mok 莫可欣	WINNER in 1993	Unplaced (44th placed)		
1995	Halina Tam 譚小環	WINNER in 1994	Unplaced (45th placed)		
1996	Sofie Rahman 李嘉慧	1st RUNNER-UP in 1995	Unplaced (70th placed)		Winnie Young, Miss Hong Kong 1995, was replaced because she held United States citizenship.
1997	Lee San-san 李珊珊	WINNER in 1996	Unplaced (45th placed)		
1998	Virginia Yung 翁嘉穗	WINNER in 1997	Unplaced		
1999	Anne Heung 向海嵐	WINNER in 1998	Unplaced	Miss Photogenic (Top 7)	
2000	Sonija Kwok 郭羨妮	WINNER in 1999	Unplaced	Miss Photogenic (Top 10)	
Kimmy Low directorship — a franchise holder to Miss Universe from 2024
2024	Joanne Rhodes 姚祖恩	MU Hong Kong WINNER in 2024 By Zetrix Company	Unplaced		
Phoebe Chu directorship — a franchise holder to Miss Universe between 2025-2026
2025	Lizzie Li 李詩逸	MU Hong Kong WINNER in 2025	Unplaced		
2026	Jennifer (Jen) Zhou 周婷	MU Hong Kong WINNER in 2026	TAB		

=== Miss World Hong Kong ===
- : Declared as Winner
- : Ended as runner-up or top 5/6 qualification
- : Ended as one of the finalists or semifinalists
- : Ended as special awards winner

Year	Miss World HK	Placement at Miss Hong Kong	Placement at Miss World	Special awards	Notes
Lee Choi Fet directorship — a franchise holder to Miss World between 1959―1972
1959	Michelle Mok Ping-Ching 莫萍貞	WINNER in 1959	Unplaced		
Did not compete between 1960―1969
1970	Ann Lay 黎霓	APPOINTED (Miss Gorgeous at Miss Hong Kong 1970)	Unplaced		
1972	Gay Mei-Lin 姬美蓮	―	Unplaced		
Did not compete between 1973―1972
TVB directorship — a franchise holder to Miss World between 1973―1988
1973	Judy Yung 容朱迪	1st RUNNER-UP in 1973	Unplaced		
1974	Judith Dirkin 杜茱迪	1st RUNNER-UP in 1974	Unplaced	Miss Personality	
1975	Teresa Chu 朱翠娟	1st RUNNER-UP in 1975	Unplaced		
1976	Christine Leung 梁靜文	1st RUNNER-UP in 1976	Unplaced		
1977	Shui Yung Lui 呂瑞容	1st RUNNER-UP in 1977	Unplaced		
1978	Faustina Lin 連惠玲	1st RUNNER-UP in 1978	Unplaced		
1979	Mary Ng 吳美麗	1st RUNNER-UP in 1979	Unplaced		
1980	Julia Chan 陳鳳芝	1st RUNNER-UP in 1980	Unplaced		
1981	Winnie Chin 錢慧儀	1st RUNNER-UP in 1981	Unplaced		
1982	Cally Kwong 鄺美雲	1st RUNNER-UP in 1982	Unplaced		
1983	Maggie Cheung 張曼玉	1st RUNNER-UP in 1983	Top 15		
1984	Joan Tong 唐麗球	2nd RUNNER-UP in 1984	Unplaced		Margaret Ma, the 1st runner-up of Miss Hong Kong 1984, was replaced because she was too old to compete in the Miss World pageant.
1985	Aleen Lo 羅錦如	1st RUNNER-UP in 1985	Unplaced		
1986	May Ng 吳婉芳	1st RUNNER-UP in 1986	Unplaced		
1987	Pauline Yeung 楊寶玲	WINNER in 1987	Top 12	Continental Queen of Asia	
1988	Michelle Reis 李嘉欣	WINNER in 1988	Unplaced		
ATV held the franchise to send representatives to Miss World pageant between 1989―1991 ― No detailed list here.
1992	Patsy Lau 劉殷伶	1st RUNNER-UP in 1992	Unplaced		TVB held the franchise to send representative to Miss World pageant again, after losing it for three years.
1993	May Lam 林麗薇	1st RUNNER-UP in 1993	Unplaced		
1994	Annamarie Wood 活麗明	1st RUNNER-UP in 1994	Unplaced		
1995	Shirley Chau 周婉儀	2nd RUNNER-UP in 1995	Unplaced		Sofie Rahman, the 1st runner-up of Miss Hong Kong 1995, was replaced because she chose to compete in Miss Universe 1996 instead.
1996	Chillie Poon 潘芝莉	1st RUNNER-UP in 1996	Unplaced		
1997	Vivian Lee 李明慧	1st RUNNER-UP in 1997	Unplaced		
1998	Jessie Chiu 趙翠儀	1st RUNNER-UP in 1998	Unplaced		
1999	Marsha Yuan 原子鏸	1st RUNNER-UP in 1999	Unplaced		
2000	Margaret Kan 簡佩堅	1st RUNNER-UP in 2000	Unplaced		
2001	Gigi Chung 鍾沛枝	1st RUNNER-UP in 2001	Unplaced		
2002	Victoria Jane Jolly 左慧琪	1st RUNNER-UP in 2002	Unplaced		
2003	Rabee'a Yeung 楊洛婷	1st RUNNER-UP in 2003	Unplaced		
2004	Queenie Chu 朱慧敏	1st RUNNER-UP in 2004	Unplaced		
2005	Tracy Ip 葉翠翠	WINNER in 2005	Unplaced	Miss World Beach Beauty (Top 19)	
2006	Janet Chow 周家蔚	1st RUNNER-UP in 2006	Unplaced		Aimee Chan, Miss Hong Kong 2006, was replaced because she was too old to compete in the Miss World pageant.
2007	Kayi Cheung 張嘉兒	WINNER in 2007	Top 16	Beauty with a Purpose	
2008	Skye Chan 陳倩揚	1st RUNNER-UP in 2008	Unplaced		Edelweiss Cheung, Miss Hong Kong 2008, was replaced because she could not compete due to personal reasons.
2009	Sandy Lau 劉倩婷	WINNER in 2009	Unplaced		
2010	Sammi Cheung 張秀文	1st RUNNER-UP in 2010	Unplaced	Miss World Beach Beauty (Top 40)	Toby Chan, Miss Hong Kong 2010, was replaced due to a scheduling conflict between the Miss World pageant and the Miss Chinese International pageant.
2011	Hyman Chu 朱希敏	1st RUNNER-UP in 2011	Unplaced		Rebecca Zhu, Miss Hong Kong 2011, was replaced due to concerns about her English proficiency.
2012	Kelly Cheung 張曦雯	APPOINTED (Miss Chinese International 2012)	Unplaced	Interview Scores (Top 40); Miss World Beach Beauty (Top 46); Miss World Top Model (Top 10)	Appointed by TVB as Hong Kong's representative in the Miss World pageant due to a change in the time frame for the Miss World pageant.
2013	Jacqueline Wong 黃心穎	1st RUNNER-UP in 2012	Unplaced	Interview Scores (Top 12); Miss World Talent (Top 11)	Replaced Carat Cheung, Miss Hong Kong 2012, as Cheung was too old to compete in the Miss World pageant.
2014	Erin Wong 王卓淇	1st RUNNER-UP in 2014	Unplaced		Replaced Grace Chan, Miss Hong Kong 2013, as Chan had crowned her successor.
Did not compete between 2015―2016
2017	Emily Wong 黃瑋琦	2nd RUNNER-UP in 2017	Unplaced		TVB held the franchise to send representative to Miss World pageant again, after losing it for two years.
2018	Wing Wong 王詠珩	APPOINTED (Miss International Hong Kong 2017)	Unplaced		
2019	Lila Lam 林艷蘭	APPOINTED (Miss Cosmopolitan Hong Kong 2019)	Top 40	Miss World Top Model (Top 10)	
Did not compete since 2020

== See also ==
- Miss Asia Pageant
- Miss Chinese Toronto Pageant
- Miss Chinese (Vancouver) Pageant
- Mr. Hong Kong – The male pageant.
- "Un banc, un arbre, une rue" – The adapted theme song for the pageant
