= Miss Hong Kong 2020 =

2020 Hong Kong beauty contest

- Date: August 30, 2020
- Presenters: Carol Cheng （鄭裕玲）, Luk Ho Ming （陸浩明）, Mayanne Mak （麥美恩）, Patrick Lam （林溥來）
- Venue: TVB City, Hong Kong
- Broadcaster: TVB
- Entrants: 18
- Placements: 10
- Winner: Lisa-Marie Tse (謝嘉怡)
- Photogenic: Lisa-Marie Tse (謝嘉怡)

The Miss Hong Kong Pageant 2020 (Chinese: 2020香港小姐競選) was the 48th Miss Hong Kong Pageant that was held in TVB City on 30 August 2020. There was a socially distanced and masked audience due to the ongoing COVID-19 pandemic.

Miss Hong Kong 2019 winner Carmaney Wong crowned her successor Lisa-Marie Tse at the end of the pageant. The theme of the pageant was gardens, forestry, and nature.

== Results ==
=== Placements ===
| Final results | Contestant |
|---|---|
| Miss Hong Kong 2020 | 8 – Lisa-Marie Tse |
| 1st runner-up | 2 - Celina Harto |
| 2nd runner-up | 4 - Rosita Kwok |
| Top 5 | 3 - Roxanne Ho; 5 - Maisie Kwong |

=== Special awards ===
These awards were given during the telecast of the pageant on August 30:

- Miss Photogenic:8.Lisa-Marie Tse (謝嘉怡)
- Miss Friendship:5.Maisie Kwong (鄺美璇）

== Delegates ==
The Miss Hong Kong 2020 delegates are:

| No. | Contestant | Age | Height | Note |
|---|---|---|---|---|
| 1 | Amber Chan (陳煦凝) | 24 | 162.5 cm | |
| 2 | Celina Harto (陳楨怡) | 23 | 171 cm | 1st runner-up |
| 3 | Roxanne Ho (何孟珊) | 24 | 171 cm | Top 5 Finalist |
| 4 | Rosita Kwok (郭柏妍) | 22 | 167 cm | 2nd runner-up |
| 5 | Maisie Kwong (鄺美璇) | 24 | 170 cm | Top 5 Finalist, Miss Friendship, sister of Miss Hong Kong 2016 contestant Maggie Kwong 鄺美淇 |
| 6 | Jessica Liu (廖慧儀) | 24 | 168 cm | |
| 7 | Ceci Mak (麥詩晴) | 23 | 170 cm | |
| 8 | Lisa-Marie Tse (謝嘉怡) | 25 | 160 cm | Winner, Miss Photogenic |
| 9 | Rosanna Tse (謝恩靈) | 18 | 165 cm | |
| 10 | Yancy Wong (黃婉恩) | 26 | 163 cm | |

Top 12 Finalist:

| Contestant | Age | Height | Note |
|---|---|---|---|
| Uki Law (羅雪妍) | 25 | 168 cm | |
| Casa Yuen (源菲然) | 21 | 167 cm | Born in South Africa; cousin of Lisa-Marie Tse |

Top 15 Finalist:

| Contestant | Age | Height | Note |
|---|---|---|---|
| Joyce Chong (張盈悦) | 22 | 159 cm | Overseas delegate from Los Angeles |
| Michelle Hau (候嘉欣) | 23 | 170.5 cm | |
| Ivy Lai (賴琦媛) | 20 | 164.5 cm | |

Top 18 Finalist:

| Contestant | Age | Height | Note |
|---|---|---|---|
| Charmaine Fan (范倩雯) | 23 | 169 cm | |
| Sonia Leung (梁懿婷) | 22 | 164.5 cm | |
| Kelly Lin (連佳麗) | 24 | 161 cm | |

== Elimination chart ==
| Contestants | Round 1 (Top 18) (16 Jul) | Round 2 (Top 15) (9 Aug) | Round 3 (Top 12) (17 Aug) | Round 4 (Top 10) (24 Aug) | Round 5 (Top 5) (30 Aug) | Round 6 (Top 3) (30 Aug) |
|---|---|---|---|---|---|---|
| Lisa-Marie Tse | Advance | Advance | Advance | Advance | Advance | Champion |
| Celina Harto | Advance | Advance | Advance | Advance | Advance | 1st runner-up |
| Rosita Kwok | Advance | Advance | Advance | Advance | Advance | 2nd runner-up |
| Roxanne Ho | Advance | Advance | Advance | Advance | Advance | Eliminated |
| Maisie Kwong | Advance | Advance | Advance | Advance | Advance | Eliminated |
| Amber Chan | Advance | Advance | Advance | Advance | Eliminated | |
| Jessica Liu | Advance | Advance | Advance | Advance | Eliminated | |
| Ceci Mak | Advance | Advance | Advance | Advance | Eliminated | |
| Rosanna Tse | Advance | Advance | Advance | Advance | Eliminated | |
| Yancy Wong | Advance | Advance | Advance | Advance | Eliminated | |
| Casa Yuen | Advance | Advance | Advance | Eliminated | | |
| Uki Law | Advance | Advance | Advance | Eliminated | | |
| Michelle Hau | Advance | Advance | Eliminated | | | |
| Joyce Chong | Advance | Advance | Eliminated | | | |
| Ivy Lai | Advance | Advance | Eliminated | | | |
| Sonia Leung | Advance | Eliminated | | | | |
| Charmaine Fan | Advance | Eliminated | | | | |
| Kelly Lai | Advance | Eliminated | | | | |
