= Huang Jiawen =

Huang Jiawen may refer to:

- Carmaney Wong (Chinese: 黃嘉雯; pinyin: Huáng Jiāwén, born 1993), Hong Kong actress, model, and beauty pageant winner
- Helena Wong (weightlifter) (Chinese: 黃嘉汶; pinyin: Huáng Jiāwèn, born 1988), Singaporean weightlifter
- Wong Ka Man (table tennis) (Chinese: 黃家汶; pinyin: Huáng Jiāwèn, born 1985), Hong Kong para table tennis player
- Wong Ka Man (footballer), Hong Kong footballer
