= Wong Ka Man =

Wong Ka Man may refer to:

- Wong Ka Man (table tennis), professional para table tennis player who won a Paralympic gold medal
- Wong Ka Man (footballer), footballer on the Hong Kong national team
- Wong Ka Man, birth name of actress Carmaney Wong
- Helena Wong Kar Mun, birth name of Helena Wong (weightlifter)
