= Miss Hong Kong 2026 =

- Date: August 30, 2026
- Hosts: Kenneth Ma (馬國明); Edwin Siu (蕭正楠); Raymond Cho (曹永廉); Ho Ming Luk (陸浩明); Leonard Cheng (鄭衍峰)
- Entertainment: Edmond Leung (梁漢文); Gin Lee (李幸倪); Mike Tsang (曾比特); Vic Teo (張與辰); MYNT
- Venue: TVB City, Tseung Kwan O, New Territories, Hong Kong
- Broadcaster: TVB
- Entrants: 12
- Placements: 8
- Winner: Bernice Yuen (袁絲珩)
- Photogenic: Scarlett Li (李澤欣)

The Miss Hong Kong Pageant 2026 (Chinese: 2026香港小姐競選) was the 54th Miss Hong Kong Pageant, it was held on August 30, 2026.

Miss Hong Kong 2025 winner Stacey Chan (陳詠詩) crowned her successor Bernice Yuen (袁絲珩) at the end of the pageant.

The official recruitment process started on May 3, 2026, and ended May 25, 2026. The slogan was "Dare To Be Perfect" in English, and 「敢 · 至完美」 in Chinese. There were 12 delegates in the final.

== Results ==
=== Placements ===
Final Results	Contestant
Miss Hong Kong 2026	#1 Bernice Yuen (袁絲珩)
1st runner-up	#8 Ada Tang (鄧匡閔)
2nd runner-up	#2 Scarlett Li (李澤欣)
3rd runner-up	#6 Jasmine Lo (盧蔚晴)
Top 8	#5 Etherine Wei (魏欣); #7 Vera Yang (楊媛媛); #10 Cecilia Chan (陳梓穎); #11 Agnes Yan (顏懿菲)

=== Special awards ===
Awards	Contestant
Miss Friendship	#3 Chorie Li (李澄晴)
Miss Photogenic	#2 Scarlett Li (李澤欣)

== Judges ==
Main Judging Panel:

- Warren Mok (莫華倫) — Opera singer
- Wendy Law (羅穎怡) — Chairwoman of the Yan Chai Hospital
- Walter Ma (馬偉明) — Fashion designer
- Karen Chan (陳嘉賢) — Chairwoman of the Hong Kong Q-Mark Council
- Anthony Lam (林世豪) — Chairman of the Federation of Hong Kong Industries

Miss Photogenic Judging Panel:

- Philip Ng (伍允龍) — Actor
- Agnes Chan (陳美齡) — Singer and educator
- Christine Kuo (苟芸慧) — Actress and Miss Chinese International Pageant 2009 winner
- Michael Tse (謝天華) — Actor

== Contestants ==
12 finalists will compete for the title.

No.	Contestant		Age	Height	Occupation
1	袁絲珩	Bernice Yuen	26	1.68 m (5 ft 6 in)	Actor
2	李澤欣	Scarlett Li	24	1.63 m (5 ft 4 in)	Environmental, Social, and Governance (ESG) Reporting Consultant
3	李澄晴	Chorie Li	25	1.65 m (5 ft 5 in)	Pianist and dancer
4	譚雅文	Tiffany Tan	25	1.73 m (5 ft 8 in)	University student
5	魏欣	Etherine Wei	25	1.71 m (5 ft 7 1/2 in)	Wealth Management Manager
6	盧蔚晴	Jasmine Lo	20	1.66 m (5 ft 5 1/2 in)	University student
7	楊媛媛	Vera Yang	26	1.72 m (5 ft 7 1/2 in)	Product Manager
8	鄧匡閔	Ada Tang	24	1.74 m (5 ft 8 1/2 in)	Assistant to Haute Couture Brand Designer
9	周芳姿	Gracia Zhou	23	1.68 m (5 ft 6 in)	University student
10	陳梓穎	Cecilia Chan	24	1.65 m (5 ft 5 in)	Administrative Assistant
11	顏懿菲	Agnes Yan	27	1.71 m (5 ft 7 1/2 in)	University student
12	湯家琳	Caris Tang	27	1.72 m (5 ft 7 1/2 in)	University student
