= Miss Hong Kong 2023 =

Beauty pageant edition

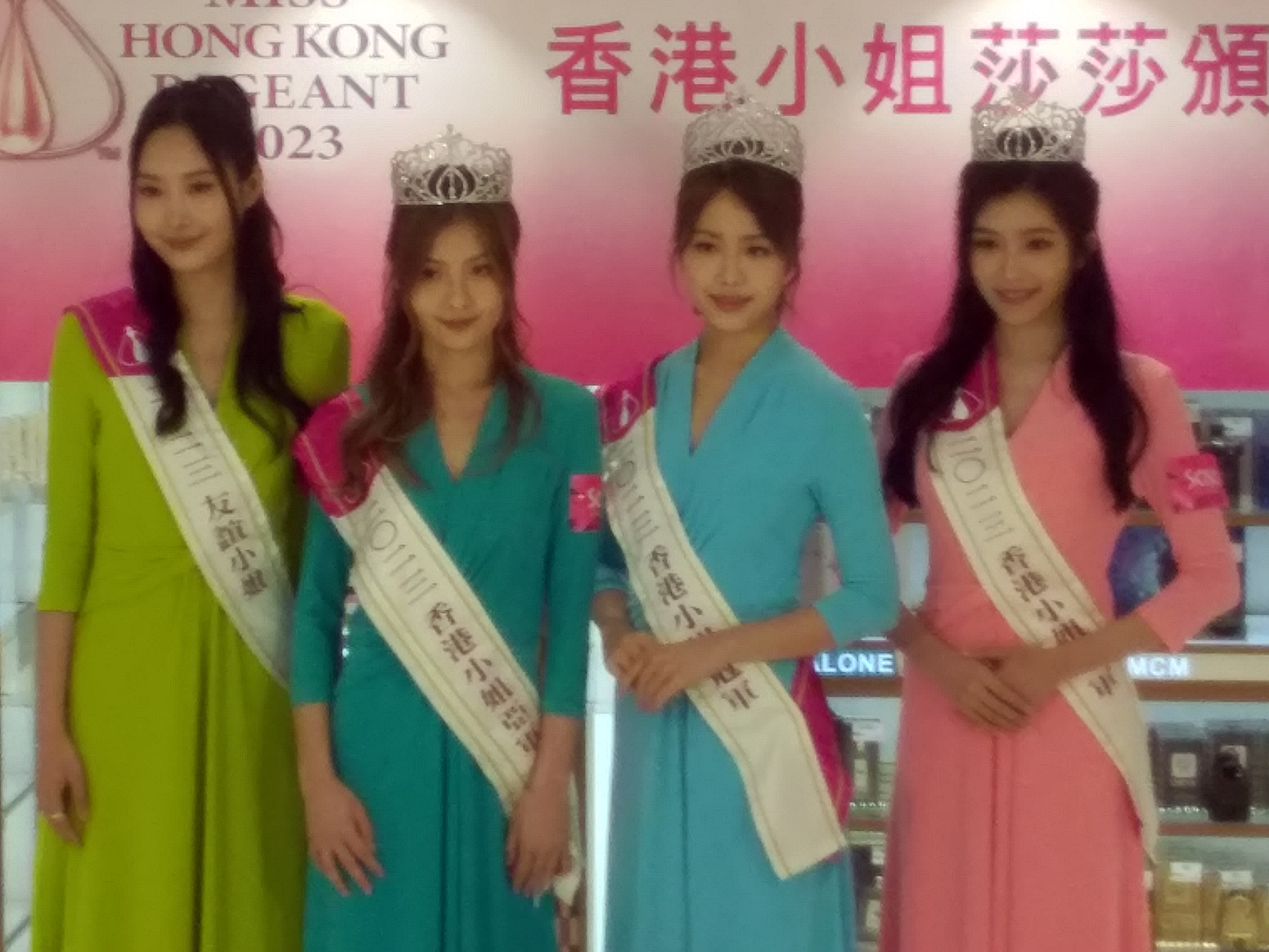
- From Left: Miss Hong Kong 2023 Miss Friendship Jenny Jiang, 1st runner-up and Miss Photogenic Lynn Wang, Champion Hilary Chong, and 2nd runner-up Lovelle Wang, attending an award presentation ceremony organised by Sa Sa on 7 September 2023
- Date: August 27, 2023
- Venue: TVB City
- Broadcaster: TVB
- Entrants: 16
- Placements: 10
- Winner: Hilary Chong（莊子璇）
- Photogenic: Lynn Wang（王怡然）

The Miss Hong Kong Pageant 2023 (Chinese: 2023香港小姐競選) was the 51st Miss Hong Kong Pageant that was held on August 27, 2023. Miss Hong Kong 2022 winner Denice Lam (林鈺洧) crowned her successor Hilary Chong (莊子璇) at the end of the pageant.

The theme was AI and the slogan was "Hello Miss Hong Kong". The official recruitment process took place from 8 May 2023 to 5 June 2023. There were 16 delegates in the final.

== History ==
On 8 May 2023, TVB, the Miss Hong Kong Pageant organizer, held a "Global Recruitment" press conference in the Tseung Kwan O TV Broadcasting City, and arranged for the current 2022 Miss Hong Kong champion Denice Lam and the 2022 first- and second- runner ups, Miss Hong Kong Champions of 2016, 2018, 2020, and 2021 to appear in the conference first broadcast the new year's Miss Hong Kong 2023 campaign recruitment promotional video, and also arranged for the above-mentioned previous years' titleholders to share their journey before and after the pageant, as well as their achievements after their pageants. It was announced at the conference that the recruitment operation is set to be carried out from that day until June 5.

== Results ==
Placements

Final results	Contestant
Miss Hong Kong 2023	#15 Hilary Chong
1st runner-up	#4 Lynn Wang
2nd runner-up	#17 Lovelle Wang
Top 5	#10 Hera Chan #16 Juliana Kwok
Top 10	#2 Jessica Wong #3 Eris Tang #7 Viktoria Mo #9 Michelle Poa #13 Cindy Chan

Special Awards

- Miss Friendship: #8 Jenny Jiang
- Miss Photogenic: #4 Lynn Wang

== Judges ==
Main Judging Panel:

- Bunny Chan (陳振彬)
- Cissy Wang (汪詩詩)
- David Harilela (夏大衛)
- Cally Kwong (鄺美雲)
- Wilfred Wong (王英偉)

Miss Photogenic Judging Panel:

- Simon Ma (馬興文)
- Kelly Cheung (張曦雯)
- Eunis Chan (陳嘉容)
- Patrick Kong (葉念琛)

== Contestants ==
No.	Contestants		Age	Height	Notes
1	Anna Ng	吳詠婷	19	5'8"	
2	Jessica Michelle Wong	黃泳嘉	22	5'7"	
3	Eris Tang	鄧凱文	23	5'5"	
4	Lynn Wang	王怡然	21	5'5"	
5	Debbie Leung	梁倩淇	24	5'3"	
6	Hannah Hu	胡睿涵	18	5'9"	
7	Viktoria Mo	毛志琛	27	5'8"	
8	Jenny Jiang	姜依宁	23	5'9"	
9	Michelle Poa	潘明璇	24	5'5"	
10	Hera Chan	陳霈錤	25	5'5"	
~~11~~	~~Jennifer Zhou~~	~~周 婷~~	~~24~~		
12	Nicole Leung	梁晶晶	25	5'4"	
13	Cindy Chan	陳曉彤	26	5'5"	
14	Zora Chen	陳怡名	26	5'4"	
15	Hilary Chong	莊子璇	21	5'6"	
16	Juliana Kwok	郭珮文	21	5'6"	
17	Lovelle Wang	王敏慈	21	5'7"	
