= Miss Hong Kong 2022 =

Beauty pageant edition

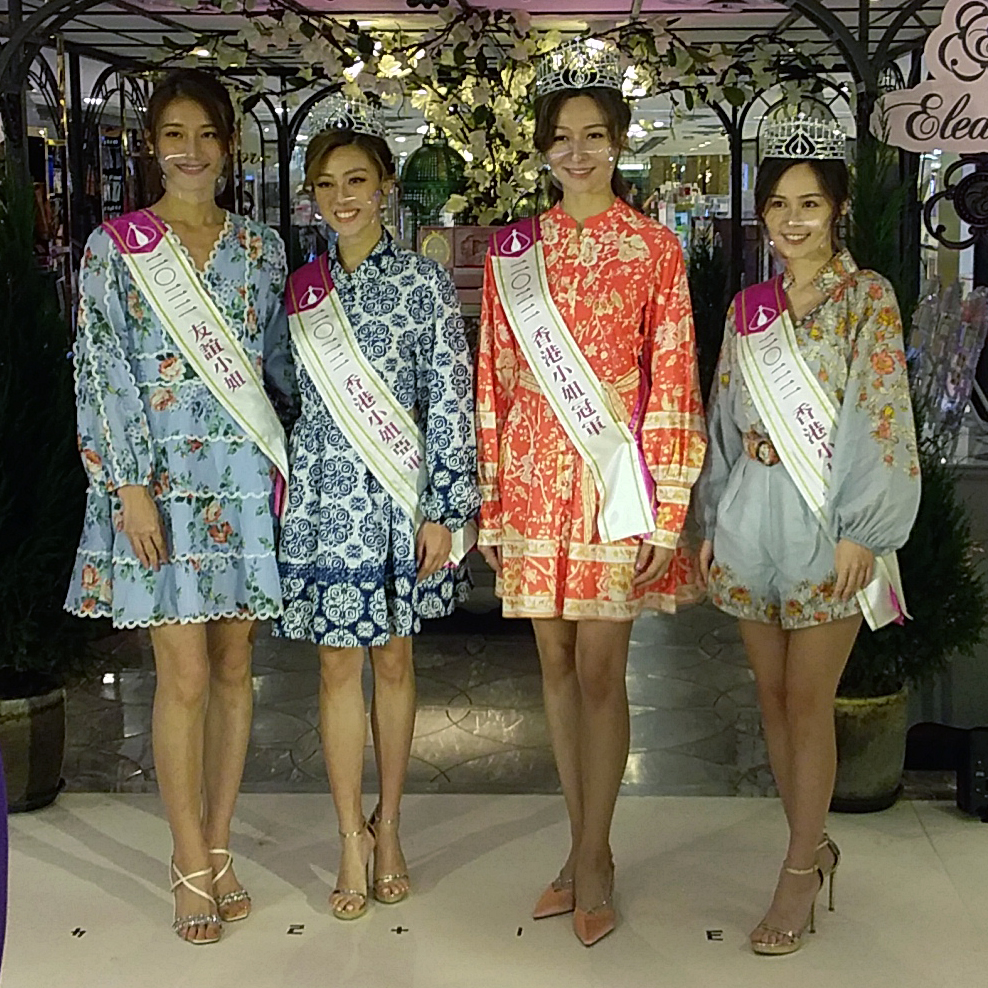
- From Left: Miss Hong Kong 2022 Miss Friendship Sharon Ying, 1st runner-up and Miss International Goodwill Cecca Xu, Champion Denice Lam, and 2nd runner-up and Miss Photogenic Joey Leung, attending an award presentation ceremony organised by Sa Sa on 30 September 2022
- Date: September 25, 2022
- Venue: Hong Kong Coliseum
- Broadcaster: TVB
- Entrants: 19
- Placements: 10
- Winner: Denice Lam (林鈺洧)
- Photogenic: Joey Leung (梁超怡)

The Miss Hong Kong Pageant 2022 (Chinese: 2022香港小姐競選) was the 50th Miss Hong Kong Pageant which was held on September 25, 2022. This pageant marks the 50th anniversary of the Miss Hong Kong Pageant since its acquisition by TVB in 1973. Miss Hong Kong 2021 winner Sabina Mendes de Assunção (宋宛穎) crowned Denice Lam (林鈺洧) at the end of the pageant.

The official recruitment process started on 17 April 2022 and concluded on 22 May 2022.

The semifinal was originally scheduled to be held on 4 September 2022. However, due to #9 Cherry Chan, #10 Ceci Ho, #13 Sharon Ying, #18 Maggie Ho and #19 Stacia Yeung contracting COVID-19, the semifinal was postponed until further notice and TVB finally decided to cancel the semi-finals on 31 August. 19 contestants all appeared in the finals on 25 September 2022.

== Results ==
Placements

Final results	Contestant
Miss Hong Kong 2022	#8 Denice Lam
1st runner-up	#4 Cecca Xu
2nd runner-up	#14 Joey Leung
Top 5	#1 Astrid Xu #9 Cherry Chan
Top 10	#2 Hebe Lam #3 Reina Chan #5 Chrissy Chen #16 Catherine Ao #17 Janice Cheung

Special Awards

- Miss Friendship: #13 Sharon Ying
- Miss International Goodwill: #4 Cecca Xu
- Miss Photogenic: #14 Joey Leung

The following awards were given during sponsor or promotion event:

- Audience Most Like Contestants: #2 Hebe Lam, #9 Cherry Chan, #14 Joey Leung and #19 Stacia Yeung
- Best Makeup Award: #4 Cecca Xu
- Environmental Conservation Ambassador Award: #4 Cecca Xu
- Netizens Most Like KOL: #8 Denice Lam
- Most Eloquent Award: #4 Cecca Xu, #11 Yohanna Fung, #14 Joey Leung and #17 Janice Cheung

== Contestants ==
No.	Contestants		Age	Height	Notes
1	Astrid Xu	徐麟	25	171.5	Top 5 Finalist
2	Hebe Lam	林曉彤	25	167	
3	Reina Chan	陳瑞菱	25	162	
4	Cecca Xu	許子萱	25	162.5	1st runner-up; Miss International Goodwill
5	Chrissy Chen	陳婉怡	24	162.5	
~~6~~	Wendy Lam	~~林泳怡~~	~~19~~	~~166~~	Withdrew for academic reasons
7	Gabrielle Wang	王子蝶	24	162.5	
8	Denice Lam	林鈺洧	27	176	Winner
9	Cherry Chan	陳銘鳳	26	170	Top 5 Finalist
10	Ceci Ho	何思懿	23	166.5	
11	Yohanna Fung	馮嘉敏	23	169	
12	Naomi Zhang	張可欣	23	161.5	
13	Sharon Ying	邢慧敏	27	175	Miss Friendship
14	Joey Leung	梁超怡	26	160	2nd runner-up; Miss Photogenic
15	Chloe Cheung	張光怡	25	162.5	
16	Catherine Ao	敖嘉揚	24	170	
17	Janice Cheung	張靜婷	27	168	
18	Maggie Ho	何詩琪	27	160	
19	Stacia Yeung	楊溢	26	164	
20	Khaki Leung	梁家琪	22	160	

== Elimination chart ==
Contestants	Round 1 (Top 19)	Round 2 (Top 10)	Round 3 (Top 5)	Round 4 (Top 3)
Denice Lam	Advance	Advance	Advance	Champion
Cecca Xu	Advance	Advance	Advance	1st runner-up
Joey Leung	Advance	Advance	Advance	2nd runner-up
Astrid Xu	Advance	Advance	Eliminated	
Cherry Chan	Advance	Advance	Advance	Eliminated
Hebe Lam	Advance	Advance	Advance	Eliminated
Reina Chan	Advance	Advance	Eliminated	
Chrissy Chen	Advance	Advance	Eliminated	
Catherine Ao	Advance	Advance	Eliminated	
Janice Cheung	Advance	Advance	Eliminated	
Sharon Ying	Advance	Eliminated		
Gabrielle Wang	Advance	Eliminated		
Ceci Ho	Advance	Eliminated		
Yohanna Fung	Advance	Eliminated		
Naomi Zhang	Advance	Eliminated		
Chloe Cheung	Advance	Eliminated		
Maggie Ho	Advance	Eliminated		
Stacia Yeung	Advance	Eliminated		
Khaki Leung	Advance	Eliminated		

== Judges ==
Main Judging Panel:

- Mrs. Janet Lee
- Mrs. Margaret Leung
- Dr. Simon Kwok
- Dr. Dennis T L Sun
- Mr. Shek Lai-him Abraham

Miss Photogenic judging panel:

- Mr. Charles Yang
- Miss. Qi Qi
- Miss Monica Chan
- Miss.Niki Chow
- Mr. Zulian Kam KL
