= Ye Qianwen =

Ye Qianwen (葉蒨文) may refer to:

- Sally Yeh (born 1961), Hong Kong Cantopop diva and actress
- Sophie Yip (born 1992), Hong Kong actress and model, see Miss Hong Kong 2016
