= Miss Hong Kong 2021 =

Beauty pageant edition

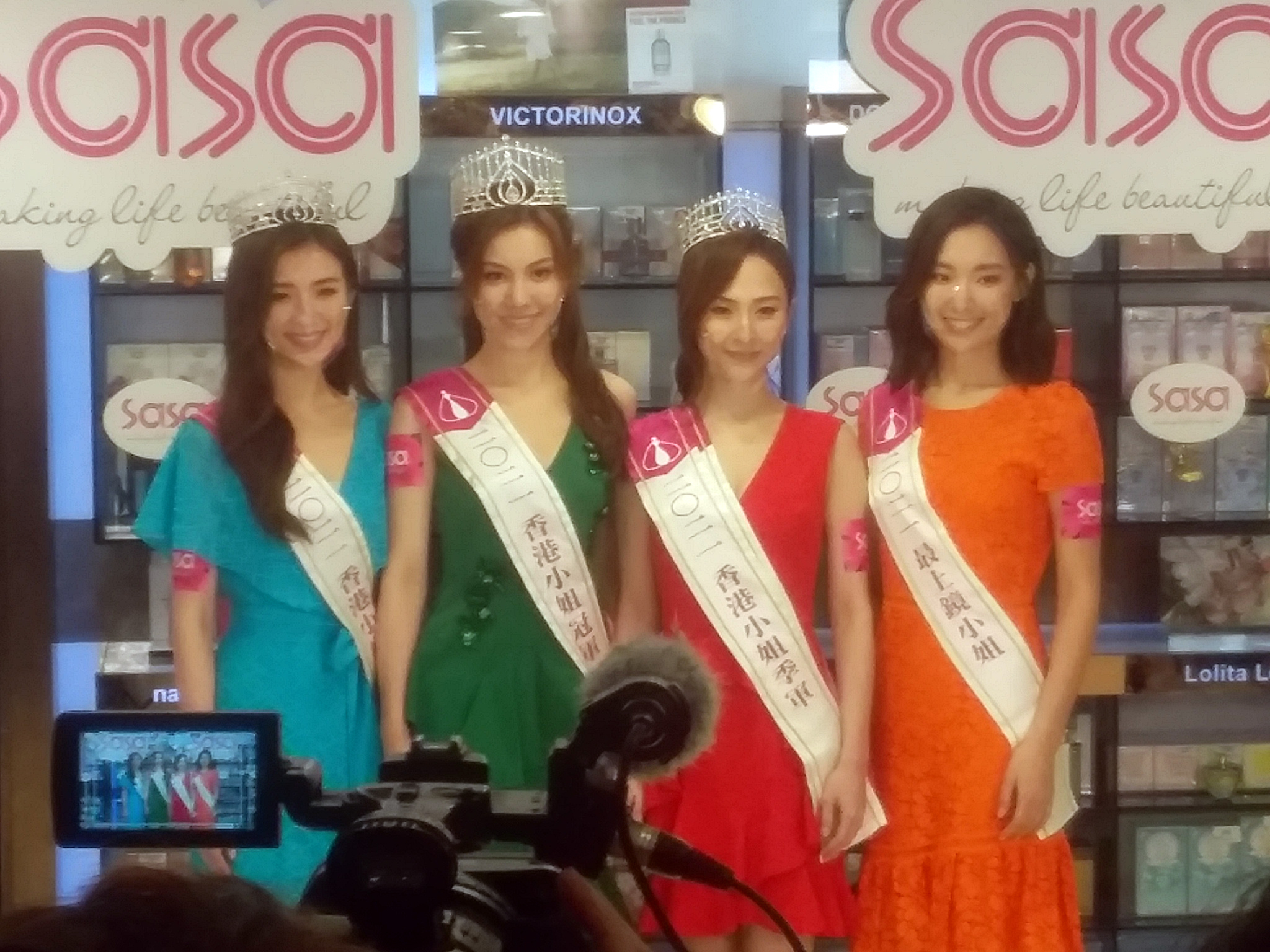
- From Left: Miss Hong Kong 2021 1st runner-up Carina Leung, Champion Sabina Mendes de Assunção, 2nd runner-up and Miss Friendship Kristy Shaw, and Miss Photogenic Penny Yeung, attending an award presentation ceremony organised by Sa Sa on 14 September 2021
- Date: September 12, 2021
- Presenters: Carol Cheng, Chin Ka-lok, Grace Chan, Karl Ting, Chow Ka-lok
- Venue: TVB City
- Broadcaster: TVB
- Entrants: 28
- Placements: 12
- Winner: Sabina Mendes de Assunção (宋宛穎)
- Photogenic: Penny Yeung (楊培琳)

The Miss Hong Kong Pageant 2021 (Chinese: 2021香港小姐競選) was the 49th Miss Hong Kong Pageant that was held on September 12, 2021. Miss Hong Kong 2020 winner Lisa-Marie Tse crowned the new Miss Hong Kong 2021 winner, Sabina Mendes de Assunção (宋宛穎), at the end of the pageant. Her official name is Sabina, but she goes by Sabrina.

The official recruitment process took place from May 10, 2021, to June 6, 2021. The semifinal took place on August 22, 2021, with the final taking place on 12 September 2021. The slogan of the pageant is "We Miss Hong Kong". 28 delegates competed for the title.

== Results ==
Placements

Final results	Contestant
Miss Hong Kong 2021	#8 Sabina Mendes de Assunção
1st runner-up	#15 Carina Leung
2nd runner-up	#14 Kristy Shaw
Top 5	#4 Fabienne Kwan #13 Cathy Wong
Top 8	#2 Rachel Chan #3 Yvette Chan #10 Penny Yeung
Top 12	#12 Michelle Ip #18 Vincy Mok #19 Jasmin Schneider #20 Katerina Leung

Special Awards

- Wai Yin Association Charity Award: #20 Katerina Leung
- Miss Friendship: #14 Kristy Shaw
- Miss Photogenic: #10 Penny Yeung

The following awards were given during sponsor or promotion event:

- E.A. Beauty Master: #15 Carina Leung, #17 Trixie Yu, Christie Chang and Nicole Ma
- Treasure Hunt Winners: #2 Rachel Chan, #3 Yvette Chan, #5 Michelle Cheung, #7 Fiona Dai and #12 Michelle Ip
- Healthy Vitality: #7 Fiona Dai
- Fitness Posture: #13 Cathy Wong
- Top 20 Audience Most Like Contestant: #3 Yvette Chan and #9 Anna Wang (tie)
- Sasa Beauty Master: #4 Fabienne Kwan and #8 Sabina Mendes de Assunção
- Sasa Beauty Story Award: #13 Cathy Wong, #14 Kristy Shaw, #15 Carina Leung, #18 Vincy Mok, #19 Jasmin Schneider and #20 Katerina Leung
- Top 12 Audience Most Like Contestant: #4 Fabienne Kwan

== Contestants ==
There are 28 Miss Hong Kong 2021 contestants. The 28 delegates were narrowed to 20 at the conclusion of the We Miss Hong Kong STAY-cation reality series. The Semi-Final competition was held on August 22, 2021, to further narrow down to 12 contestants ahead of the Finals on September 12, 2021.

No.	Contestants		Age	Height	Team	Notes
1	Chloe Leung	梁允瑜	23	5'9"	Green	
2	Rachel Chan	陳懿德	23	5'6"	Green	
3	Yvette Chan	陳聖瑜	26	5'5"	Orange	
4	Fabienne Kwan	關楓馨	26	5'4"	Red	Top 5 Finalist
5	Michelle Cheung	張嘉倩	21	5'6"	Pink	
6	Angel Yu	余曉蕙	24	5'3"	Pink	
7	Fiona Dai	戴佳敏	24	5'7"	Pink	
8	Sabina Mendes de Assunção	宋宛穎	22	5'7"	Pink	Winner
9	Anna Wang	王婳婳	25	5'5"	Pink	Miss Chinese Montreal 2015 2nd Runner-up
10	Penny Yeung	楊培琳	19	5'7"	Green	Miss Photogenic
11	Brillian Lau	劉珍寶	25	5'5¾"	Pink	
12	Michelle Ip	葉靖儀	23	5'7"	Green	
13	Cathy Wong	王嘉慧	26	5'7"	Orange	Top 5 Finalist; Miss International HK 2021 Top 6 Finalist (withdrew)
14	Kristy Shaw	邵初	27	5'5"	Red	2nd runner-up; Miss Friendship
15	Carina Leung	梁凱晴	26	5'5¾"	Orange	1st runner-up
16	Juliana Ng	伍韻婷	27	5'3"	Orange	
17	Trixie Yu	余詠童	24	5'6"	Green	
18	Vincy Mok	莫韻諰	23	5'7"	Orange	
19	Jasmin Schneider	施茉莉	18	5'10"	Red	
20	Katerina Leung	梁菁琳	27	5'4"	Red	
N/A	Christie Chang	姜嘉琳	24	5'7"	Red	Miss Chinese NY 2017 Miss Best Talent and Top 5
N/A	Fiona Chen	陳詩帆	21	5'3"	Red	
N/A	Chloe Lo	盧淑儀	26	5'7"	Orange	
N/A	Nicole Ma	馬嘉希	20	5'3"	Green	
N/A	Kimberlie Chu	朱綽盈	22	5'6"	Pink	Miss Asia Pacific HK 2018 Best Skin Award
N/A	Vivienna Lai	賴彥妤	26	5'6"	Green	Miss Talent International (HK) 2014 2nd Runner-up; Miss Chinatown UK 2019 Winner
N/A	Jo An Ma	馬祖雁	23	5'5"	Orange	
N/A	Mona Zhao	趙美倫	18	5'6"	Red	

== We Miss Hong Kong STAY-cation ==
In 2021, a new reality-TV style show called "We Miss Hong Kong STAY-cation" was broadcast on TVB for 2 weeks from August 9 to 19. The contestants were split into four teams to be mentored by past Miss Hong Kong winners: Pink Team mentored by Sandy Lau (Miss Hong Kong 2009) and Sammi Cheung (Miss Hong Kong 2010 1st Runner Up), Red Team mentored by Mandy Cho (Miss Hong Kong 2003) and Regina Ho (Miss Hong Kong 2017 1st Runner Up), Green Team mentored by Anne Heung (Miss Hong Kong 1998) and Rebecca Zhu (Miss Hong Kong 2011) and Orange Team mentored by Kayi Cheung (Miss Hong Kong 2007) Crystal Fung (Miss Hong Kong 2016). Like many other reality-TV shows, contestants are eliminated on a regular basis.

Teams	Episode 2		Episode 4		Episode 6		Episode 8	
	Rank	Lowest Score	Rank	Lowest Score	Rank	Lowest Score	Rank	Scores
Pink Team	3rd	Angel Yu	1st		4th	Brillian Lau Kimberlie Chu†	1st	1. Sabina Mendes de Assunção; 2. Fiona Dai; 3. Anna Wang; 4. Michelle Cheung; 5. Angel Yu; 6. Brillian Lau
Red Team	4th	Mona Zhao†	3rd		1st		4th	1. Jasmin Schneider; 2. Kristy Shaw; 3. Fabienne Kwan; 4. Katerina Leung; 5. Christie Chang†; 6. Fiona Chen†
Green Team	2nd		2nd		3rd	Trixie Yu Vivienna Lai†	2nd	1. Michelle Ip; 2. Penny Yeung; 3. Rachel Chan; 4. Chloe Leung; 5. Trixie Yu; 6. Nicole Ma†
Orange Team	1st		4th	Jo An Ma†	2nd		3rd	1. Yvette Chan; 2. Cathy Wong; 3. Carina Leung; 4. Vincy Mok; 5. Juliana Ng; 6. Chloe Lo†

† Indicates eliminated contestant

== Elimination chart ==
Contestants	STAY-cation Episode 1 (Top 28) (9 Aug)	STAY-cation Episode 2 (Top 27) (10 Aug)	STAY-cation Episode 4 (Top 26) (12 Aug)	STAY-cation Episode 6 (Top 24) (17 Aug)	STAY-cation Episode 8 (Top 20) (19 Aug)	Semi Finals Round 1 (Top 16) (22 Aug)	Semi Finals Round 2 (Top 12) (22 Aug)	Finals Round 1 (Top 8) (12 Sep)	Finals Round 2 (Top 5) (12 Sep)	Finals Round 3 (Top 3) (12 Sep)
Sabina Mendes de Assunção	Advance	Advance	Advance	Advance	Advance	Advance	Advance	Advance	Advance	Champion
Carina Leung	Advance	Advance	Advance	Advance	Advance	Advance	Advance	Advance	Advance	1st runner-up
Kristy Shaw	Advance	Advance	Advance	Advance	Advance	Advance	Advance	Advance	Advance	2nd runner-up
Fabienne Kwan	Advance	Advance	Advance	Advance	Advance	Advance	Advance	Advance	Advance	Eliminated
Cathy Wong	Advance	Advance	Advance	Advance	Advance	Advance	Advance	Advance	Advance	Eliminated
Yvette Chan	Advance	Advance	Advance	Advance	Advance	Advance	Advance	Advance	Eliminated	
Rachel Chan	Advance	Advance	Advance	Advance	Advance	Advance	Advance	Advance	Eliminated	
Penny Yeung	Advance	Advance	Advance	Advance	Advance	Advance	Advance	Advance	Eliminated	
Michelle Ip	Advance	Advance	Advance	Advance	Advance	Advance	Advance	Eliminated		
Jasmin Schneider	Advance	Advance	Advance	Advance	Advance	Advance	Advance	Eliminated		
Vincy Mok	Advance	Advance	Advance	Advance	Advance	Advance	Advance	Eliminated		
Katerina Leung	Advance	Advance	Advance	Advance	Advance	Advance	Advance	Eliminated		
Michelle Cheung	Advance	Advance	Advance	Advance	Advance	Advance	Eliminated			
Angel Yu	Advance	Advance	Advance	Advance	Advance	Advance	Eliminated			
Anna Wang	Advance	Advance	Advance	Advance	Advance	Advance	Eliminated			
Fiona Dai	Advance	Advance	Advance	Advance	Advance	Advance	Eliminated			
Chloe Leung	Advance	Advance	Advance	Advance	Advance	Eliminated				
Brillian Lau	Advance	Advance	Advance	Advance	Advance	Eliminated				
Juliana Ng	Advance	Advance	Advance	Advance	Advance	Eliminated				
Trixie Yu	Advance	Advance	Advance	Advance	Advance	Eliminated				
Christie Chang	Advance	Advance	Advance	Advance	Eliminated					
Nicole Ma	Advance	Advance	Advance	Advance	Eliminated					
Chloe Lo	Advance	Advance	Advance	Advance	Eliminated					
Fiona Chen	Advance	Advance	Advance	Advance	Eliminated					
Vivienna Lai	Advance	Advance	Advance	Eliminated						
Kimberlie Chu	Advance	Advance	Advance	Eliminated						
Jo-An Ma	Advance	Advance	Eliminated							
Mona Zhao	Advance	Eliminated								

== Judges ==
Main Judging Panel:

- Mr. Lawrence Yu Kam-kee, SBS, JP
- Ms. Loletta Chu, Miss Hong Kong 1977
- Ms. Michelle Ong
- Mr. Lam Tai-fai, SBS, JP
- Mr. Andrew Lau

Miss Photogenic judging panel:

- Mr. Alan Chan
- Ms. Kathy Chow
- Ms. Sofie Rahman, Miss Hong Kong 1995 First runner-up and Miss Photogenic
- Mr. Ringo Tang
