= Miss Hong Kong 2025 =

- Date: August 31, 2025
- Presenters: Chin Ka-lok (錢嘉樂); Mayanne Mak (麥美恩); Louis Yuen (阮兆祥); Randal Tsang (曾展望); Sophie Yip Sin-Man (葉蒨文)
- Venue: TVB City
- Broadcaster: TVB
- Entrants: 14
- Placements: 10
- Winner: Stacey Chan (陳詠詩)
- Photogenic: Victoria Lee Wan-yin (李尹嫣)

The Miss Hong Kong Pageant 2025 (Chinese: 2025香港小姐競選) was the 53rd Miss Hong Kong Pageant that was held on August 31, 2025.

Miss Hong Kong 2024 winner Ellyn Ngai (倪樂琳) crowned her successor Stacey Chan (陳詠詩) at the end of the pageant.

The official recruitment process started on May 1, 2025, and ended June 15, 2025. The slogan was "Do you wanna be…" in English, and 「成就無限可能」 in Chinese. There were 14 delegates in the final.

== Results ==
=== Placements ===
Final Results	Contestant
Miss Hong Kong 2025	#9 Stacey Chan (陳詠詩)
1st runner-up	#7 Angela Stanton (施宇琪)
2nd runner-up	#13 Jane Yuan (袁文靜)
Top 5	#1 Victoria Lee Wan-yin (李尹嫣); #3 Emily Tsoi (蔡華英)
Top 10	#4 Molly Mo (莫凡); #5 Elysia Tsang (曾閱遙); #6 Teresa Chu (朱文慧); #10 Tamson Manning (文雅儀); #11 Barbie Leung (梁倩萱)

=== Special awards ===
Awards	Contestant
Miss Friendship	#1 Victoria Lee Wan-yin (李尹嫣)
Miss Photogenic	#1 Victoria Lee Wan-yin (李尹嫣)

== Judges ==
Main Judging Panel:

- Orlando Ho (何猷啟)
- Amanda Ho (何芷韻)
- Charles Yang (楊傳亮)
- Jacqueline Chung Sun (孫鍾婉琪)
- Alan Lo (羅揚傑)

Miss Photogenic Judging Panel:

- Simon Yam (任達華)
- Candice Yu (余安安)
- Gaile Lok (樂基兒)
- William Kan (簡耀宗)

== Contestants ==
14 finalists are competing for the title:

#	Contestant		Age	Height (cm)	Occupation
1	李尹嫣	Victoria Lee Wan-yin	21	171	University student
2	甘詠寧	Phoebe Kam	26	171	Social worker
3	蔡華英	Emily Tsoi	23	166	University student
4	莫凡	Molly Mo	25	178	News editor
5	曾閱遙	Elysia Tsang	21	171	University student
6	朱文慧	Teresa Chu	23	165	Physical therapist
7	施宇琪	Angela Stanton	26	166	Investment bank trader
8	岳凡荻	Fandi Yue	23	166	Global export assistant
9	陳詠詩	Stacey Chan	26	160	PhD student
10	文雅儀	Tamson Manning	26	168	Orthopedic medical product representative
11	梁倩萱	Barbie Leung	27	161	Financial advisor
12	庄靜璟	Vivian Zhuang	26	174	Masters student
13	袁文靜	Jane Yuan	27	174	Project assistant manager
14	何詠多	Alison Kerr	20	161	University student
