= Gisella Ma =

Hong Kong beauty pageant winner (born 1946)

Gisella Ma Ka-Wai
- 馬嘉慧
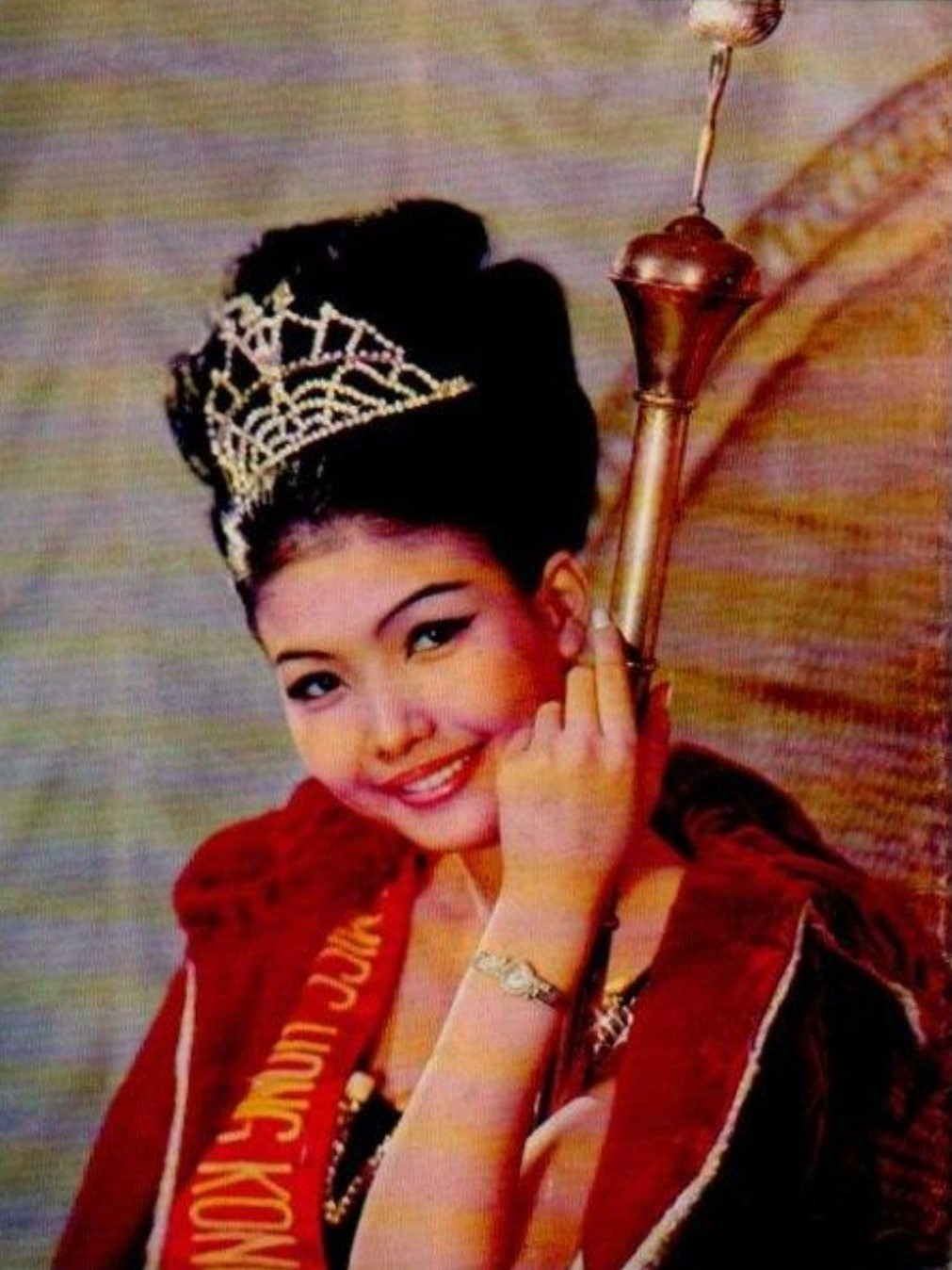
- Gisella Ma, the champion of the 1966 Miss Hong Kong pageant
- Born: Ma Ka-Wai; 1946 (age 79–80); British Hong Kong
- Citizenship: American
- Awards: Miss Hong Kong 1966

Gisella Ma Ka-Wai (馬嘉慧; born 1946) won the Miss Hong Kong pageant in 1966. In April of the following year, she represented Hong Kong in the 1967 Miss International pageant held in Long Beach, California, USA, becoming the first Hong Kong representative selected as a Miss Hong Kong pageant. Gisella Ma Ka-Wai secured fifth place in this international beauty pageant.

== Participate in Miss Hong Kong ==
The 1966 Miss Hong Kong Pageant was held in October, with the semi-finals on October 6 and the finals on October 15. Both events were held at the Hai Tian Restaurant and Nightclub in the Ocean Terminal in Tsim Sha Tsui, which had just been completed in March 1966. Ma was 20 years old when she participated in the pageant. Her competition number was 19. She was 5 feet 4.5 inches tall, weighed 107 pounds, and her measurements were 34, 23, and 35 inches.

The semi-finals of the 1966 Miss Hong Kong pageant were held on the evening of October 6. Ten contestants were selected from the 23 contestants to compete in the finals held on the evening of October 15. Ma successfully advanced to the finals to compete for the championship. The semi-finals were held on the evening of October 6. Ten contestants were selected from the 23 contestants to compete in the finals held on the evening of October 15. The Kung Sheung Evening News held a guessing event "Who is Miss Hong Kong" on October 8. Readers in Hong Kong can fill in the list of the top five most likely to win the Miss Hong Kong pageant on the guessing form printed in the newspaper, and submit or mail the guessing form to the newspaper's newspaper office on Fenwick Street in Wan Chai or the office on Li Yuen Street East in Central before 1:00 pm on October 15. If submitted by mail, the postmark date of October 14 will be used as the reference. The first prize winner will receive a round-trip ticket from Hong Kong to Bangkok, Thailand, on Thai Airways. The remaining prizes include a free suckling pig and abalone dinner at Hai Tian Restaurant, a Girard-Perregaux ladies' watch, Hennessy Lier Fougere cognac and Elizabeth Arden cosmetics. If the number of correct guesses exceeds the quota, the winner will be decided by a draw at a later date by the Miss Hong Kong winner of that year.

The 1966 Miss Hong Kong finals was held at 9:40 pm on October 15, Hong Kong Summer Time. The seats were packed and the scene was lively. The famous movie star Angela Yu was also a guest. The seven-member judging panel that decided the rankings of the contestants was composed of Chinese and Westerners. The 10 contestants first appeared in cheongsams, then evening dresses, and finally swimsuits. In the evening dress segment, Ma Jiahui appeared in an evening dress made of white satin and pink balls, which immediately stole the spotlight. After three rounds of performances in different costumes, the seven-member judging panel left the room at 11:47 to discuss. After half an hour of discussion, at 00:19 on October 16 (this is daylight saving time, which is one hour ahead of standard time. If the standard time is 11:19 on October 15, it is not considered an all-night Miss Hong Kong final), the organizers announced the winner of the 1966 Miss Hong Kong pageant. The 20-year-old contestant No. 19, Ma Jiahui, won the championship. Afterwards, Mrs. Lei Changmin, chairman of the Hai Tian Restaurant, crowned Ma Jiahui and awarded her the Miss Hong Kong scepter. Compared with the previous Miss Hong Kong pageants, which often had unexpected results, Ma Jiahui was one of the favorites in this year's Miss Hong Kong pageant, so the media was not surprised by her election as Miss Hong Kong.

Ma Ka Wai later attended the award ceremony hosted by her sponsor. One of the prizes was a diamond watch presented by Girard-Perregaux, while the other four top five contestants also received watches made of real gold and crystal. Girard-Perregaux also said that it would notify its agency in the United States to assist Ma in participating in the Miss International pageant in the United States in February of the following year.

At 3pm on October 31, the newly crowned Miss Hong Kong, Ma, along with Cantonese film stars Li Hong, Law Lan, He Lan and Gao Feng, attended the "Who is Miss Hong Kong" draw and award ceremony hosted by Kung Sheung Evening News at the Ocean Terminal's Hai Tian Restaurant. During the 13 days of the Miss Hong Kong contest, a total of 22,632 guessing forms were received. Since the number of forms that guessed correctly or were closest to the result exceeded the number of prizes in each category, according to the rules of the event, Ma hosted the public draw for the grand prize on stage, determined the winner, and presented the prize to the winner.

== Representing Hong Kong in overseas beauty pageants ==
On February 26, 1967, Ma said in an exclusive interview with the Commercial Evening News that she planned to participate in the 1967 Miss International pageant and then stay in the United States to study fashion design for two years. Before going to the United States to participate in the Miss International pageant, she would first be invited to fly to Sydney, Australia to attend the Pacific Photography Exposition.

=== Miss Pacific ===
On March 13, 1967, Ma, who represented Hong Kong in the Miss Pacific pageant, won third place. Ma then took Air New Zealand back to Hong Kong, preparing to leave for the United States three weeks later to represent Hong Kong in the Miss International pageant.

=== Miss International ===
The 1967 Miss International pageant was held in Long Beach,California in April. Ma represented Hong Kong in the competition. On the afternoon of April 17, Ma went to the United States to compete. She first flew to Tokyo, and then to the United States. Ma accepted a media interview at Kai Tak Airport. She said that for this time, she only cares about working hard to represent Hong Kong in the Miss International pageant. Regardless of the final victory or defeat, she will do her best.

On April 29, 1967, the 1967 Miss International pageant was held in Miami, Florida, USA. Among the 46 contestants from all over the world, Ma, who represented Hong Kong, was on the list and won the fifth place. Ma did not join the entertainment industry after the Miss International pageant. Instead, she studied in the United States in a low-key manner and worked in a friend's restaurant. In August 1969, Hong Kong media reported that Ma had "disappeared" in the United States, and her brother, who had just returned to Hong Kong from New York, had to refute the rumor.

== Participated in beauty pageants ==
- 1966 Miss Hong Kong: Champion
- 1967 Miss Pacific: 3rd runner-up
- 1967 Miss International: 5th place
