= Sammi Cheung =

Hong Kong actress (born 1987)

Sammi Cheung Sau Man
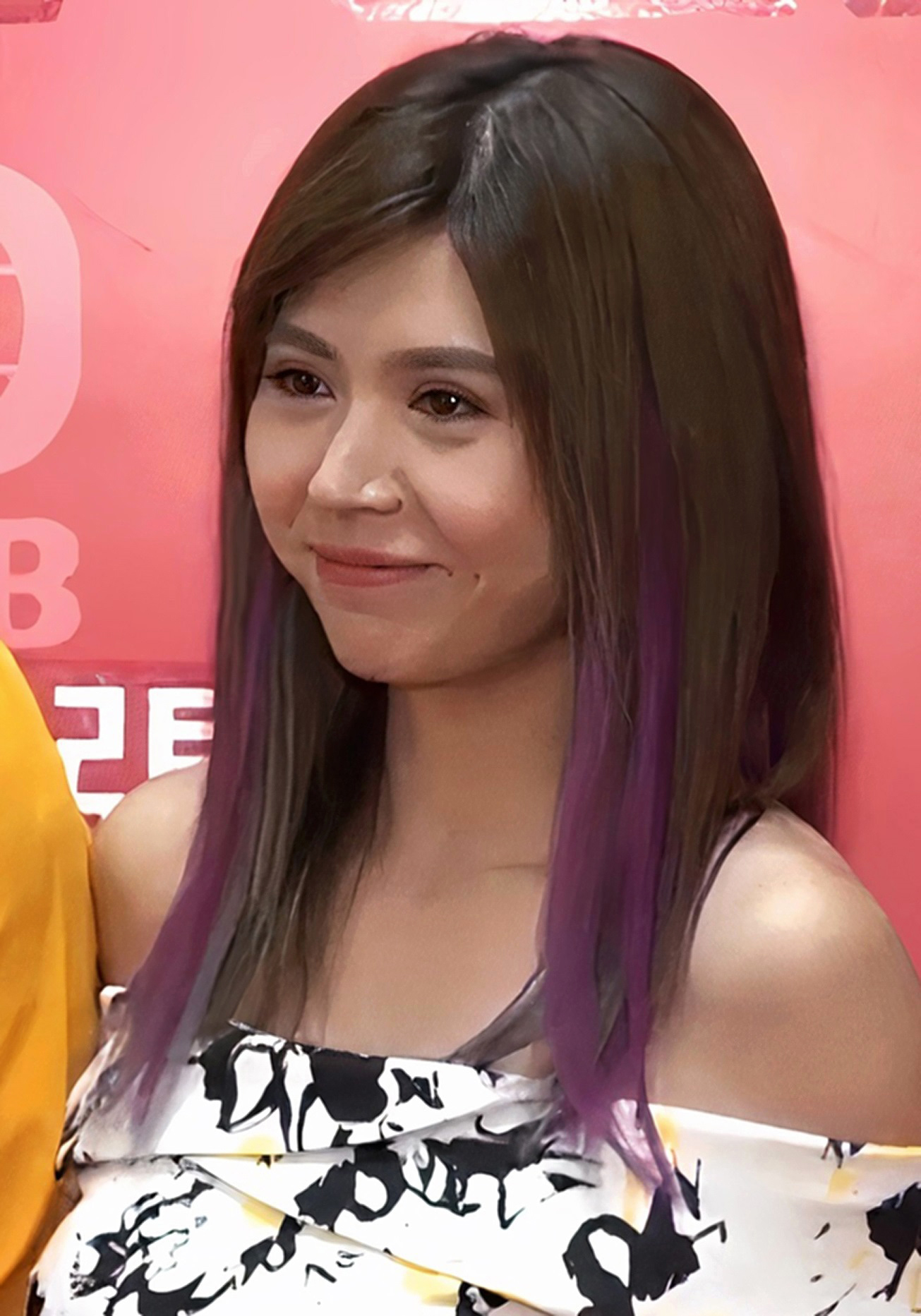
- The press conference of TVB drama, The Witness
- Born: 26 September 1987 (age 38); Hong Kong
- Education: Hong Kong University Chemistry; City University of Hong Kong
- Relatives: one sister and one brother

Sammi Cheung Sau Man (Chinese: 張秀文; born 26 September 1987) is a Hong Kong TVB actress and the first runner-up of Miss Hong Kong 2010.

== Biography ==
Sammi Cheung was educated at ELCHK Ma On Shan Lutheran Primary School, Kiangsu-Chekiang College (Shatin). She entered University of Hong Kong to study chemistry. However, she dropped out of college after a year when her mother became sick and Cheung had to work. She continued her studies a year later at City University of Hong Kong, majoring in business administration. She lived at Yiu On Estate, Ma On Shan with her family.

In 2010, she participated in the Miss Hong Kong 2010 and was the first runner-up of the show. She then became an actor of TVB. She was prominent for having a 34D bust. She has worked as a master of ceremonies since then as she was required by her boyfriend, Victor Chow, the son of Chow Chee Keong.

In 2020, Cheung starred in a TVB drama, The Witness as Yuki, becoming the first TV drama she starred.
