= Bonjour Holdings =

Bonjour Holdings Limited
- Company type: Listed company
- Traded as: SEHK: 653
- Industry: Retail
- Founded: 1991
- Headquarters: Bonjour Tower, No. 36–50 Wang Wo Tsai Street, Tsuen Wan, Hong Kong
- Area served: Hong Kong, Macau
- Key people: Chairman: Mr. Chen Jianwen
- Products: Beauty, Health & Beauty Life products
- Revenue: HK$ 1.79 bn (2018) (US$ 228 M)
- Operating income: HK$ -16 M (US$ -1.8 M)
- Number of employees: 850
- Website: Bonjour Holdings Limited

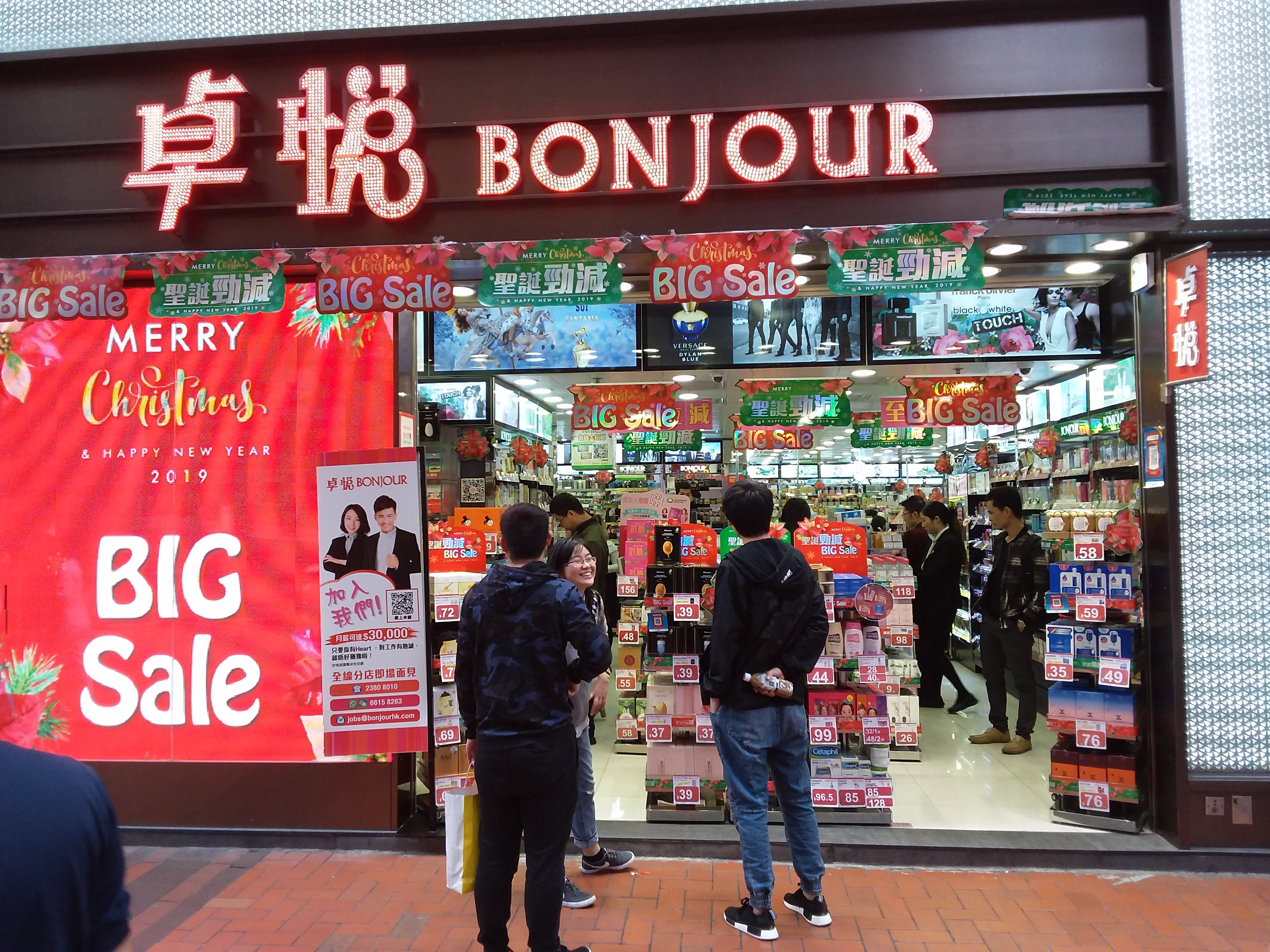
Bonjour store in Causeway Bay, Hong Kong.

Bonjour Holdings Limited (Chinese: 卓悅控股) is a Hong Kong–based investment holding company principally engaged in the sales of beauty products.

The company was founded in 1991. Its first branch was located in the Jordan area of Hong Kong. The company was listed on the Hong Kong Stock Exchange in 2003. As of 2019, the chain has 39 retail stores in Hong Kong (35), Macau (3), and Guangzhou (1).

Bonjour's annual revenue totaled HK$1.79 billion for the fiscal year ending in December 2018.

== See also ==
- Sa Sa International Holdings
