= Thomas Hui To =

Hong Kong businessman

Thomas Hui To JP
- 許濤
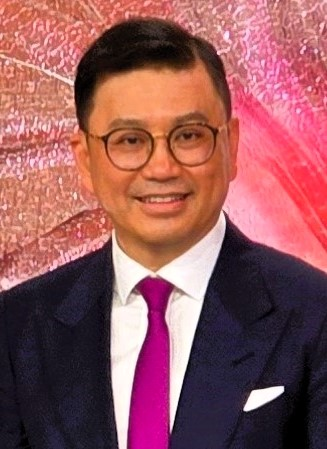
- Hui attending the Miss Hong Kong 2024 final at the TVB City on 15 September 2024
- Born: 1 May 1972 (age 53)
- Education: Master of Electronic Engineering, Cornell University, USA

Thomas Hui To JP (Chinese: 許濤; born 1 May 1972) is a Hong Kong businessman and investor. He is the Executive Chairman of Television Broadcasts Limited, the 14th Chinese People's Political Consultative Conference Shanghai Committee (Culture & Arts), the chief operating officer and an executive director of CMC Inc., director of Young Lion Holdings Limited, Young Lion Acquisition Co. Limited, and Shaw Brothers Limited.

== Biography ==
Thomas holds Hong Kong permanent residency, finished high school in Hong Kong and obtained a master's degree in electronic engineering from Cornell University. He had served as an executive director at Goldman Sachs's Hong Kong investment banking department, and worked for Merrill Lynch. In 2015, he joined TVB as non-executive director and a member of its executive committee, the company's highest decision-making body. On 21 March 2018, Thomas become Executive Director of the Television Broadcasts Limited. On 29 April 2020, Thomas become non-executive chairman of Television Broadcasts Limited. In 2020, Thomas as executive producer of the Netflix movie Over the Moon (2020 film). In December 2022, Thomas appointed as the 14th Chinese People's Political Consultative Conference Shanghai Committee (Culture & Arts). In 10 March 2023, Thomas become the Executive Chairman of Television Broadcasts Limited. On 1 July 2024, Thomas was appointed Justice of the Peace by the Hong Kong government.
