= Miss Hong Kong 2024 =

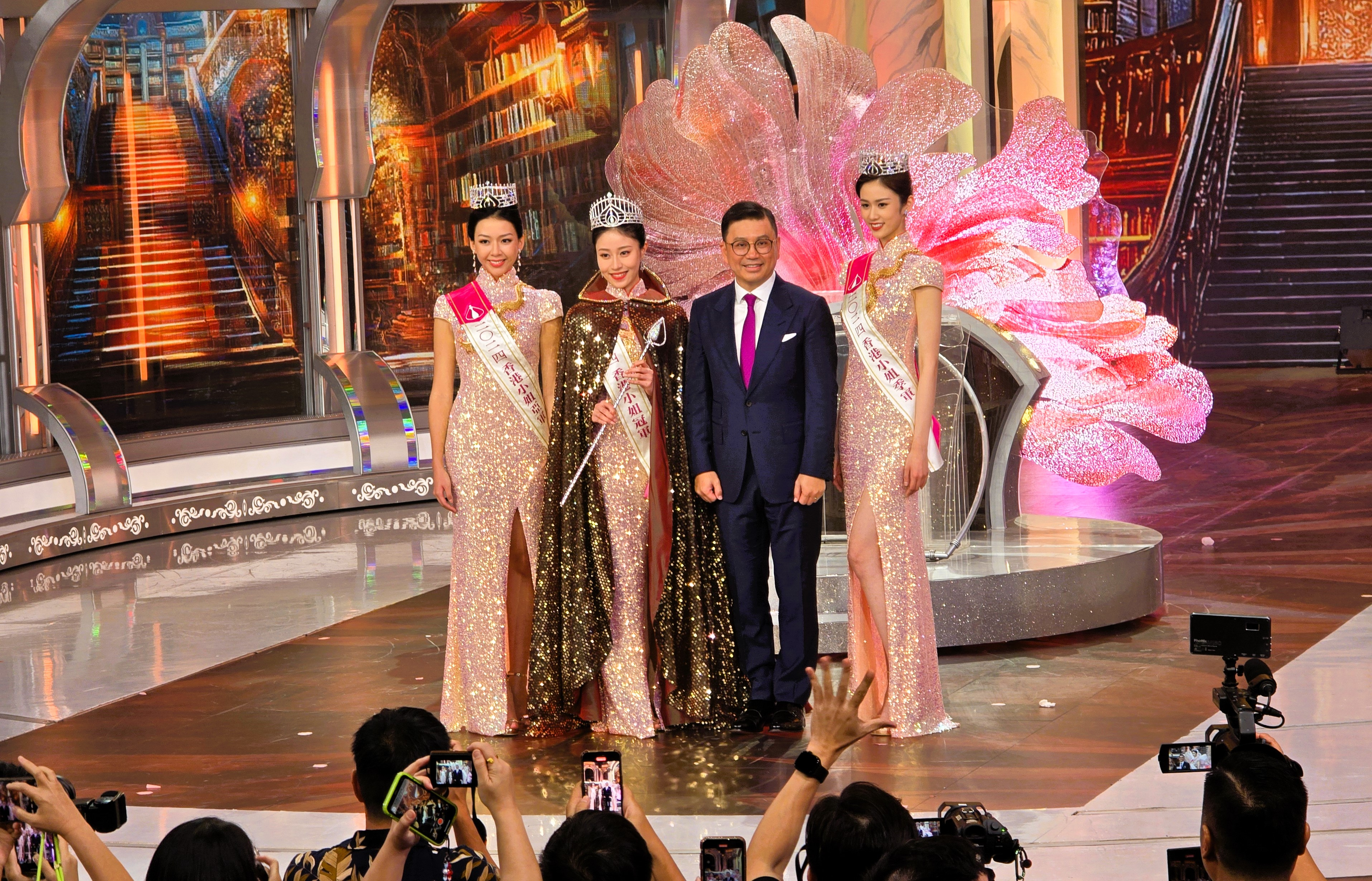
- From Left: Miss Hong Kong 2024 1st runner-up Emily Leung (梁嘉莹), winner Ellyn Ngai (倪樂琳) with the TVB executive chairman Thomas Hui To (許濤), and 2nd runner-up Amina Yeung (楊梓瑤) taking photo by the press after the Miss Hong Kong Pageant 2024 final.
- Date: September 15, 2024
- Venue: TVB City
- Broadcaster: TVB
- Entrants: 15
- Placements: 10
- Winner: Ellyn Ngai (倪樂琳)
- Photogenic: Emily Leung (梁嘉莹)

The Miss Hong Kong Pageant 2024 (Chinese: 2024香港小姐競選) was the 52nd Miss Hong Kong Pageant which its final was held on September 15, 2024. The Miss Hong Kong 2023 winner Hilary Chong (莊子璇) crowned her successor Ellyn Ngai (倪樂琳) at the end of the pageant.

The official recruitment process started on May 13, 2024, and ended June 10, 2024. The slogan was "Proud to be a Woman." There were 15 delegates in the final.

== Results ==
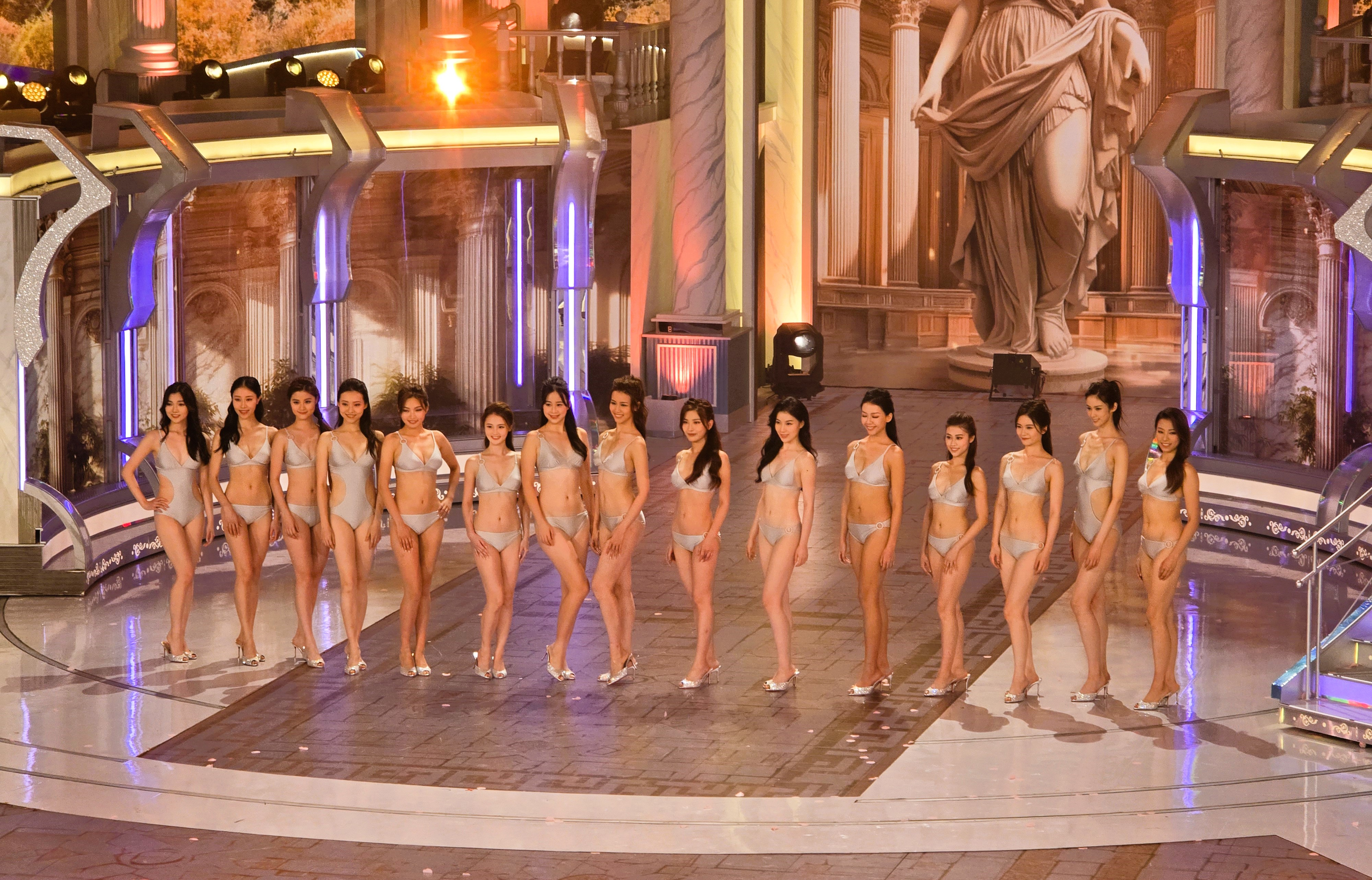
The 15 delegates wearing bikinis at the final

Placements

Final results	Contestant
Miss Hong Kong 2024	#2 Ellyn Ngai (倪樂琳)
1st runner-up	#11 Emily Leung (梁嘉莹)
2nd runner-up	#14 Amina Yeung (楊梓瑤)
3rd runner-up	#10 Clary Wu (吳芷靖)
Top 10	#3 Candice Wong (王汛文) #4 Zoie Tse (謝淑怡) #7 Yvonne Qin (秦冀雯) #8 Kerry Lo (盧凱怡) #12 Tracy Chung (鍾翠詩) #15 Kanis Yu (俞可程)

Special Awards

- Miss Friendship: #3 Candice Wong (王汛文)
- Miss Photogenic: #11 Emily Leung (梁嘉莹)

== Presenter ==
- Ms. Hilary Chong (莊子璇) — 2023 Miss Hong Kong
- Ms. Mayanne Mak (麥美恩) — Canadian television host
- Ms. Janis Chan (陳貝兒) — Conferencier
- Ms. Roxanne Ho (何沛珈) — Actress
- Ms. Rachel Chan (陳懿德) — Actress

== Judges ==
Main Judging Panel:

- Selina Chow Liang Shuk-yee (周梁淑怡)
- Liza Wang Ming-chun (汪明荃)
- Daisy Ho Chiu-fung (何超鳳)
- Melissa Kaye Pang (彭韻僖)
- Christine Ip Yeung See-ming (葉楊詩明)

Miss Photogenic Judging Panel:

- Miss Virginia Yung (翁嘉穗) — Wai Yin Association Past President
- Miss Monica Chan (陳法蓉) — Wai Yin Association Board member of Board of Trustees
- Miss Mandy Cho (曹敏莉) — Wai Yin Association Chairman of Board of Trustees
- Miss Heidi Chu (朱凱婷) — Wai Yin Association 2024/2025 President of Executive Committee
- Miss Sandy Lau (劉倩婷) — Wai Yin Association Past President

== Contestants ==
Finalists
No.	Contestants		Age	Height (cm)	Education	Occupation	Notes
1	Jessie Chan	陳紫佟	18	161.5	High school	Student	
2	Ellyn Ngai	倪樂琳	23	167.5	Undergraduate	Influencer	
3	Candice Wong	王汛文	23	166.5	Undergraduate	Administrative assistant	
4	Zoie Tse	謝淑怡	26	169	Master's	Pianist	
5	Kimmy Chong	莊曉婷	24	167.5	Undergraduate	Accountant	
6	Adria Li	李曼思	26	157	Master's	University student	
7	Yvonne Qin	秦冀雯	21	174.5	Undergraduate	University student	
8	Kerry Lo	盧凱怡	22	173	Undergraduate	Ballroom dancer and teacher	
9	Rose Chen	陳甜甜	25	164	Master's	University student	
10	Clary Wu	吳芷靖	24	166.5	Master's	Cultural producer	
11	Emily Leung	梁嘉莹	22	169	Master's	University student	
12	Tracy Chung	鍾翠詩	24	159	Undergraduate	University student	
13	Dolores Ching	程姜月	25	165	Undergraduate	Retail store owner	
14	Amina Yeung	楊梓瑤	21	179	Undergraduate	University student	
15	Kanis Yu	俞可程	26	166.5	Undergraduate	Quantity Surveyor	
