= Charles Yang =

Charles Yang may refer to:

- Charles Yang (violinist)
- Charles Yang (linguist)
