= Helena Wong (weightlifter) =

Singaporean weightlifter

Helena Wong Kar Mun
Personal information
- Nationality: Singapore
- Born: 11 April 1988 (age 37) Singapore
- Height: 1.58 m (5 ft 2 in) (2010)
- Weight: 52 kg (115 lb) (2010)
- Website: helenawong.com

Sport
- Sport: Olympic weightlifting
- Event(s): Snatch, Clean and Jerk
- Club: Singapore Weightlifting Federation
- Team: Team Singapore
- Coached by: Cyril Martin

Helena Wong Kar Mun (Chinese: 黄嘉汶; pinyin: Huáng Jiāwèn; born 11 April 1988) is a Singapore weightlifter. Wong competes in the female 53 kg weight class. She debuted at the 2010 Commonwealth Games which was held in Delhi in Oct 2010. She made history at the Games by becoming the first ever woman weightlifter to be selected by Singapore to take part in a major athletic event. She was placed 8th at the Games, her first international competition.

== Early life and education ==
Wong is the elder of the two siblings in her family. Wong attended Convent of the Holy Infant Jesus Toa Payoh School for her primary and secondary education. She was active in sports since young. She represented her school in judo and was a house captain in her upper secondary years. In her late teens, Wong decided to specialise in sports and in 2005, she opted to study sports at Nanyang Polytechnic.

Wong continued her sports specialisation into her undergraduate studies by choosing to focus in sports despite her equally keen interest towards business and economics. She gave up offers to study business and economics in Singapore's local universities and ventured overseas to study sport science in England's Loughborough University in autumn 2008. Wong graduated in June/July 2011 with a bachelor's degree in Sports and Exercise Science from the School of Sport, Exercise and Health Sciences.

As of August 2012, Wong is a sports lecturer with the Institute of Technical Education (ITE). She was previously ITE's scholar under their Associate cum Scholarship Scheme.

Had wide support from her sister.

== Sporting career ==
Wong took up weightlifting by chance. She joined the gym in her university to keep fit and to escape the cold of her hostel room. Wong started off self-coaching from the internet and books from June 2009 to February 2010 after being introduced to the sport by UK Athletics strength and conditioning coach Thomas Yule.

She met Cyril Martin, a senior weightlifting coach with British Weightlifting (BWL) at the English Weightlifting Championships held at Lilleshall in February 2010 and started training under his guidance soon after at Atlas Workout Warehouse in Alfreton, Derbyshire. Wong credits Martin's tutelage for her selection by the Singapore National Olympic Council to represent Singapore at the 2010 Commonwealth Games within a year after getting into the sport. Wong "didn't really believe it" when Singapore National Olympic Council selected her to represent the sport and the country as she was just a beginner.

SNOC Secretary-General, Chris Chan remarked that, "We took note of [Wong's] steady improvement and thought she would benefit from this New Delhi outing. Her participation would also give weightlifting a welcome boost as the sport enjoys a revival in Singapore." Similarly, Tom Liaw, President of Singapore Weightlifting Federation believes that weightlifters like Wong are contributing to the revival of the sport in Singapore since it was last represented in the 1986 Commonwealth Games. Liaw believes that "participation in major competitions like the Commonwealth Games is the next step to raising the profile of [weightlifting]" in Singapore. Wong finished the Games with a total of 146 kg (Snatch:66 kg; Clean & Jerk:80 kg) "a commendable 8th" for her debut international outing.

In August 2011, Wong embarked on a 3-month training stint in Zhuhai Sport Institute in Zhuhai, China to better prepare her for the 26th SEA Games held in Jakarta and Palembang, Indonesia in November 2011. Wong was the only representative for weightlifting and the first Singapore women to compete in weightlifting in the biennial competition. Wong faced tough competitors in the 53 kg category, meeting Thailand's top lifter and the 2008 Olympic (53 kg) champion, Prapawadee Jaroenrattanatarkoon who won with a total of 205 kg. Wong finished sixth out of nine lifters, making a total of 153 kg (70 kg snatch, 83 kg clean-and-jerk). Wong had bettered her previous performance set at the 2010 Commonwealth Games by 7 kg.

She represented Singapore at the 2012 Summer Olympics, lifting 61 kg in the snatch and 73 kg in the clean and jerk for a total of 134 kg. This meant she finished in 15th place.

== Competitive results ==
Event	Competition	Venue	Date	Result
2011
53 kg Women	26th Southeast Asian (SEA) Games	Jakabaring Sport Complex, Palembang, Indonesia	20 Nov 2011	6th
53 kg Women	British Colleges and Universities Championships	Sheffield Hallam University, Sheffield, Great Britain	11 Mar 2011	1st
2010
53 kg Women (Under 23)	British U23 Championships	Olbury College of Sport, Birmingham, Great Britain	30 Oct 2010	1st
53 kg Women	XIX Commonwealth Games	Jawaharlal Nehru Stadium, Delhi, India	5 Oct 2010	8th
53 kg Women	British Seniors Weightlifting Championships	The Hunter Centre, Kilmarnock, Scotland	26 Jun 2010	2nd
53 kg Women	English Weightlifting Championships	Lilleshall National Sports Centre, Lilleshall, Great Britain	20 Feb 2010	2nd
