= Stacey Devina Chan =

Hong Kong rhythmic gymnast

Stacey Devina Chan 陳詠詩
- Born: 12 December 1998 (age 27) Hong Kong
- Height: 160cm (5ft 3in)

Gymnastics career
- Discipline: Rhythmic gymnastics
- Country represented: Hong Kong; (2009-present)
- Education: University of California, Berkeley

Stacey Chan (Chinese: 陳詠詩, born December 12, 1998) is a Hong Kong rhythmic gymnast and the Miss Hong Kong 2025 Champion. She was selected as a member of the Hong Kong National Team in 2009 at the age of 11, and was selected for Hong Kong Sports Institute's Elite Training System and Sports Scholarship Scheme at the age of 13. She became the All-Around Champion at the 2012 Hong Kong Open Championships in the same year and has gone on to represent Hong Kong internationally. She is a recipient of the 2015 and 2016 Gymnastics Association of Hong Kong China's Outstanding Athlete Award.

== Early life ==
Chan was born in Hong Kong. She attended a Stride, Inc. virtual school to accommodate for rhythmic gymnastics training and graduated in 2017.

== Education ==
Chan is attending the University of California, Berkeley.

== Rhythmic gymnastics career ==
Chan earned her first Hong Kong All-Around Champion title at the 2012-2013 Hong Kong Rhythmic Gymnastics Open Championships and subsequently earned the All-Around Champion title at the 2014 Hong Kong Rhythmic Gymnastics Open Championships and 2015-2016 Hong Kong Rhythmic Gymnastics Open Championships. She was also the champion in hoop, ball, clubs, and ribbon at the 2015-2016 Hong Kong Rhythmic Gymnastics Open Championships. Internationally, Chan earned 1st place in Ball and 1st Runner-up in Hoop and Ribbon at the 11th Singapore Rhythmic Gymnastics Open Championships in 2014. Chan also achieved 2nd place in the Group's All Around at the 2015 Rhythmic Gymnastics National Youth Championships held in Hebei, China. She represented Hong Kong at the 2015 7th Senior Rhythmic Gymnastics Asian Championships, advancing to the finals for all events. Chan also represented Hong Kong in the 2012, 2014, and 2016 Pacific Rim Championships.

== Hong Kong media ==
Chan has been labeled as "rhythmic gymnastics beauty" and "the light of Hong Kong" by the Hong Kong media. In Cosmopolitan Hong Kong's exclusive interview Chan was dubbed as "seemingly perfect in the public's eye".

There was controversy among the Hong Kong media as some said that placing so much emphasis on an athlete's appearance is disrespectful, but some argued that it helped to popularize the sport of rhythmic gymnastics.
