= Miss Hong Kong 2019 =

Beauty contest of Hong Kong 2019

- Date: 8 September 2019
- Presenters: Carol Cheng （鄭裕玲）, Luk Ho Ming （陸浩明）, Mayanne Mak （麥美恩）
- Venue: TVB City
- Broadcaster: TVB
- Entrants: 10
- Winner: Carmaney Wong
- Photogenic: Fei Wong

Miss Hong Kong Pageant 2019 (2019 香港小姐競選) was the 47th Miss Hong Kong Pageant held in TVB City on 8 September 2019. 10 delegates competed for the title.

2018 Miss Hong Kong winner Hera Chan crowned her successor Carmaney Wong.

Winner Carmaney Wong is set to represent Hong Kong at the 2020 Miss Chinese International Pageant, which has been postponed to a future date due to the COVID-19 pandemic. The pageant had an aquatic theme.

== Results ==
=== Placements ===
Final results	Contestant
Miss Hong Kong 2019	1 – Carmaney Wong
1st runner-up	5 – Fei Wong
2nd runner-up	8 – Kelly Gu
Top 5	2 – Kayan Choi; 10 – Fefe Tse
Top 8	4 – Vivian Iu; 6 – Blossom Chan; 7 – Katy Yeung

=== Special awards ===
These awards were given during the telecast of the pageant on August 26:

- Miss Photogenic: Fei Wong
- Miss Friendship: Blossom Chan

== Delegates ==
The Miss Hong Kong 2019 delegates were:

No.	Contestant	Age	Height	Note
1	Carmaney Wong （黃嘉雯）	25	5'7"	Winner; Miss International Hong Kong 2018
2	Kayan Choi （蔡嘉欣）	25	5'8"	Top 5 Finalist
3	Maggie Leung （梁敏巧）	24	5'8"	
4	Vivian Iu （姚懿芠）	22	5'6"	
5	Fei Wong （王 菲）	23	5'5"	1st runner-up; Miss Photogenic
6	Blossom Chan （陳熙蕊）	25	5'4"	Miss Friendship; Miss Australia Chinese (Brisbane Region) 2017 Top 10 Finalist
7	Katy Yeung （楊詠彤）	23	5'11"	
8	Kelly Gu （古佩玲）	19	5'5"	2nd runner-up
9	Ivy Liu （廖倬竩）	24	5'7"	
10	Fefe Tse （謝采芝）	19	5'9"	Top 5 Finalist

Eliminated:

Contestant	Age	Height	Note
Cara Jiang （江雨婷）	25	5'9"	Miss Asia Pageant 2019 Winner
Cayley Ng （吳玥彤）	24	5'8"	Miss Asia Pageant 2019 Top 5 Finalist
Rowena Wong （黃詠柔）	22	5'3"	
Mina Yeung （楊慧敏）	25	5'6"	Winner (UStar Girl) of Face Magazine UStar 2014
Nicole Yiu （姚羽嘉）	21	5'5"	
