= Carmaney Wong =

Hong Kong fashion model

- 黃嘉雯
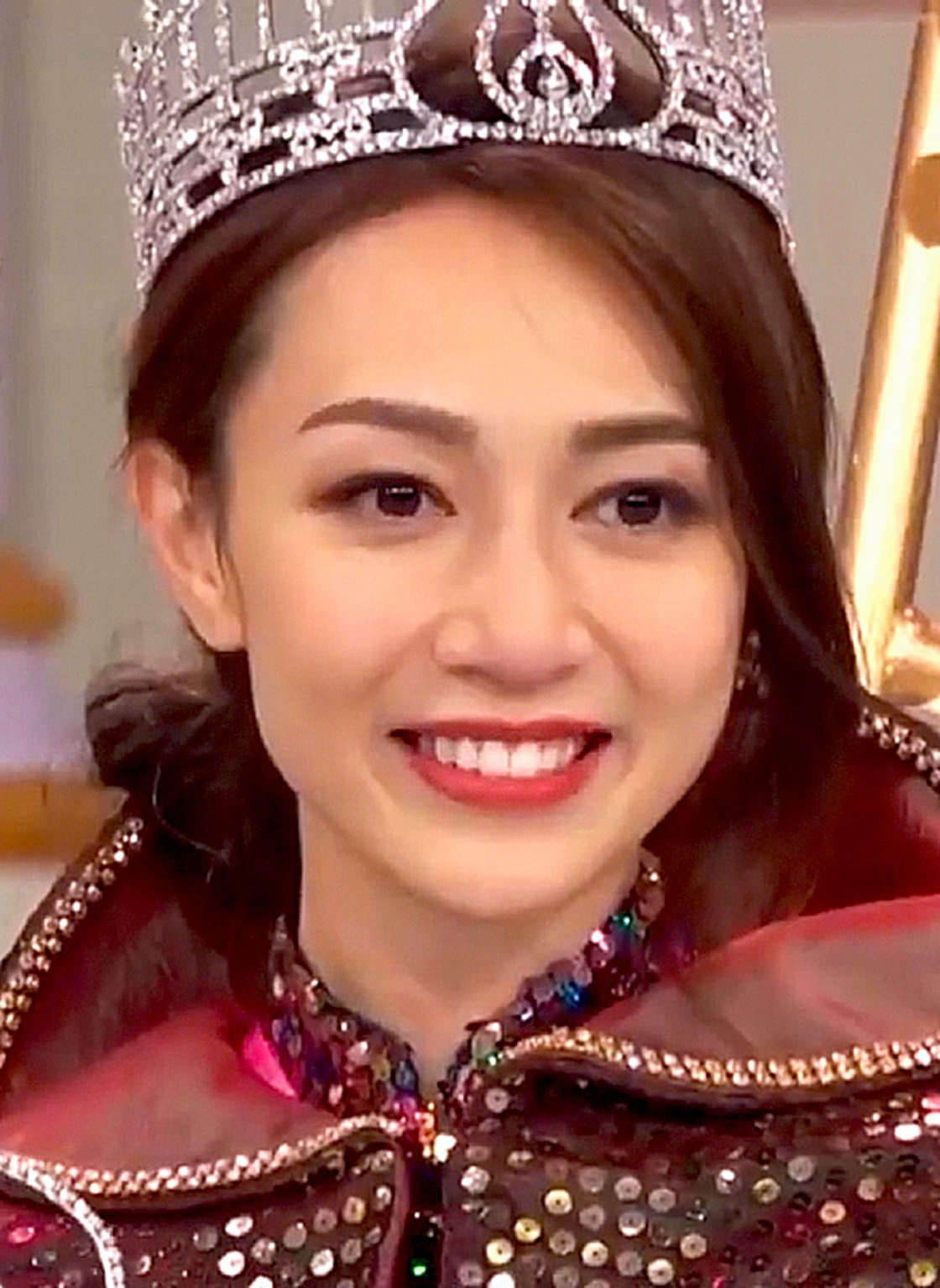
- Wong in 2019
- Born: 7 December 1993 (age 32); Hong Kong
- Other names: Carmaney Santiago; Tang Luoqing
- Education: Hong Kong Baptist University
- Beauty pageant titleholder
- Title: Miss Hong Kong 2019
- Years active: 2013–present
- Major competitions: Miss Hong Kong, Miss International

Chinese name
- Traditional Chinese: 黃嘉雯
- Simplified Chinese: 黄嘉雯
Transcriptions
Standard Mandarin
- Hanyu Pinyin: Huáng Jiāwén
Yue: Cantonese
- Jyutping: Wong^{4} Gaa^{1} Man^{4}

Alternative Chinese name
- Traditional Chinese: 湯洛晴
- Simplified Chinese: 汤洛晴
Transcriptions
Standard Mandarin
- Hanyu Pinyin: Tāng Luòqíng
Yue: Cantonese
- Jyutping: Tong^{1} Lok^{3} Cing^{4}

Carmaney Wong Ka Man (黃嘉雯; born 7 December 1993) is a Hongkonger actress, model and beauty pageant titleholder who was crowned Miss Hong Kong 2019.

Raised in a wealthy Hong Kong family, Wong pursued pageantry as a stepping stone to acting from a successful career as a commercial model. In 2019, she became the oldest Miss Hong Kong crowned in 30 years, aged 25 years and 9 months at the time of her championship. Though she had intended to pursue acting roles shortly after competing for the title, Wong's career was delayed by the serious impact that the 2019 Hong Kong protests and COVID-19 pandemic had on local and global media industries. Wong was expected to represent Hong Kong at Miss Chinese International 2020, originally scheduled in February that year but indefinitely delayed due to the COVID-19 pandemic.

== Early and personal life ==
Wong was born in December 1993 in Hong Kong. She grew up in a wealthy family, with her parents owning a HK$50,000,000 apartment in the city's Hung Hom district; they would frequently travel to mainland China for work, leaving her to manage the household. She studied humanities at Hong Kong Baptist University and performed charity work in Romania after graduating. Wong is a travel blogger and musician who has studied piano, flute, violin, and ukulele.

Wong was in a long-term relationship with Matej Tomic, a Swiss media planner who moved to Hong Kong to support her career, before breaking up in late 2022. A day after she was crowned Miss Hong Kong 2019, Wong was accused by a woman online of breaking up her relationship with her boyfriend two years before, claiming Wong sent him a Valentine's Day card and travelled to Japan with him. Wong admitted to dating him, but stated he had told her he was single, and that she would not have knowingly dated a man in a relationship.

In February 2021, Wong's older sister was arrested for animal cruelty after a video of her putting her cat in a washing machine went viral. Wong expressed regret and sorrow over the video, deeming it out of character for her sister. She later stated she had been harassed online by people blaming her for her sister's behaviour.

== Career ==
Wong began modelling in 2013, using the pseudonym Tong Lok-ching from 2013 till 2018. She worked predominantly as a commercial model, appearing in advertisements for corporations and organizations such as KFC, Blue Girl Beer, and the Hong Kong Mass Transit Railway. She also achieved attention for her work as a social media influencer, running a travel Instagram chronicling her travel to countries such as Iceland, Italy, Greece, Switzerland, and France.

Though she had not originally planned to be a beauty pageant contestant, Wong was inspired to participate by Crystal Fung, Miss Hong Kong 2016; Fung encouraged her to use pageantry as a stepping stone to an acting career. In 2018, Wong represented Hong Kong at the Miss International 2018 competition in Tokyo. She did not place, but spoke positively about the experience to broadsheet newspaper Ming Pao.

On 8 September 2019, Wong was crowned Miss Hong Kong 2019. Aged 25 years and 9 months at the time of the championship, she became the competition's oldest winner in 30 years. Wong was due to defend the title at Miss Chinese International 2020, originally scheduled for 15 February 2020, but it was delayed indefinitely due to the impact of the COVID-19 pandemic. She hoped to bring the "positive energy of Hong Kong" to other participants of Miss Chinese International and to defend Hong Kong's status as a pluralistic society with free speech protections.

Wong's post-pageant career was affected by political and social factors. In November 2019, The Straits Times reported that she had received unusually little acting work for a Miss Hong Kong winner, ascribing her delayed career progression to the 2019 Hong Kong protests disrupting the tourism and entertainment industries. By the time she relinquished the crown in September 2020, the COVID-19 pandemic had shut down much media production, further hampering her opportunities. Wong stated to Yahoo! News Singapore that although she was offered many acting opportunities, most had been postponed due to the pandemic.

In 2021, Wong reappeared in the public eye with a supporting role in the TVB drama The Line Watchers. The Chinese newspaper People's Daily, referring to her as "near-forgotten", lauded the opportunity. She also became a regular host for the TVB variety show Big City Shop.

== Filmography ==
=== Television dramas ===
Year	Title	Role	Notes
2021	The Line Watchers 《把關者們》	Tong Ka-ming	Supporting Role
2021	The Kwoks and What 《我家無難事》	Julia Chu Siu-yi	Ep. 17
2021	A Love of No Words 《十月初五的月光》	Nurse	Ep. 16-17
2022	Freedom Memories 《青春不要臉》	Pinky	Ep. 15
2022	ICAC Investigators 2022 《廉政行動2022》	Tang Lok-ching	Ep. 4
2022	Silver Lining 《曙光》	Shirley	Supporting Role
2022	《下流上車族》	Peggy	Supporting Role
TBA	Speakers of Law 《法言人》		
TBA	Mission Run 《廉政狙擊·黑幕》		

=== Film ===
Year	Title	Role
2019	The White Storm 2: Drug Lords	Kwok's Girlfriend

=== Host ===
2021: Big City Shop (流行都市)
