= Sa Sa International Holdings =

Hong Kong retail chain

Sa Sa International Holdings Limited 莎莎國際控股有限公司

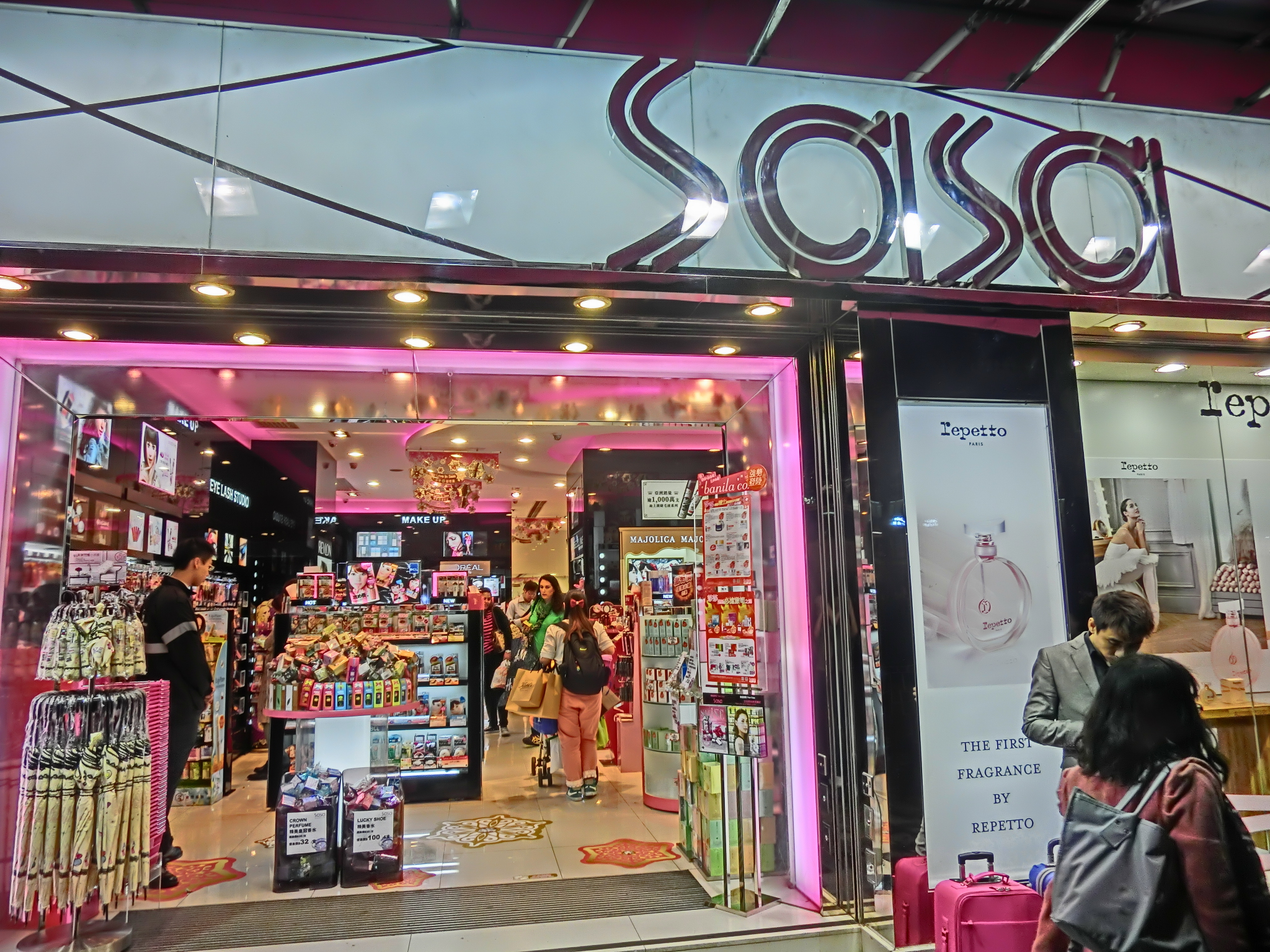
- A Sa Sa store in Hong Kong
- Type: Public
- Founded: 1978
- Headquarters: Chai Wan, Hong Kong
- Number of locations: More than 230 Sasa retail stores in 4 countries
- Area served: Hong Kong; Macau; China; Malaysia
- Operating income: $ 142M
- Net income: $ 106M
- Number of employees: 3,500
- Website: https://www.sasa.com.hk

Sa Sa International Holdings (Chinese: 莎莎國際, SEHK: 178) is a Hong Kong–based chain store company selling make-up, personal care, skin care, fragrance, hair care and body care products, inner beauty and health products as well as beauty equipment under more than 600 brands, including over 120 exclusive international brands.

The company was co-founded by Kwok Siu-Ming and his wife Kwok-Law Kwai Chun in 1978. It was listed on the Hong Kong Stock Exchange in 1997. The chain had over 230 retail stores in Hong Kong, Macau, mainland China and Malaysia. In 2019, Sa Sa closed all its 22 stores in Singapore amid stiff competition and running losses for 6 consecutive years. Sa Sa management did not inform its staff about the plans to pull out and surprised many.

The Group has been included in the Hang Seng Composite SmallCap Index, Hang Seng Small Cap (Investable) Index, FTSE World Index Series and MSCI Index Series. It has been a constituent member of Hang Seng Corporate Sustainability Benchmark Index since 2011.

== See also ==
- Bonjour Holdings
