= Miss Hong Kong 2016 =

- Date: 11 September 2016
- Presenters: Carol Cheng (鄭裕玲), Natalis Chan (陳百祥), 6 Wing @ FAMA (陸永@農夫), C Kwan @ FAMA (Ｃ君@農夫), Bob Lam (林盛斌)
- Venue: TVB City
- Broadcaster: TVB
- Winner: Crystal Fung
- Photogenic: Tiffany Lau

Miss Hong Kong Pageant 2016 was held together with Mr. Hong Kong 2016 at TVB City on 11 September 2016. Ten delegates competed for the Miss Hong Kong title.

Miss Hong Kong 2015 Louisa Mak crowned her successor Crystal Fung.

== Results ==
=== Placements ===
| Final results | Contestant |
|---|---|
| Miss Hong Kong 2016 | Crystal Fung |
| 1st runner-up | Tiffany Lau |
| 2nd runner-up | Bonnie Chan |
| 3rd runner-up | Andrea So |

=== Special awards ===
- Miss Photogenic: Tiffany Lau
- Miss Friendship: Bowie Cheung 張寶兒

== Delegates ==
The Miss Hong Kong 2016 delegates were:

| Contestant | Age | Height | Note |
|---|---|---|---|
| Bonnie Chan 陳雅思 | 26 | 5'6½" | Miss Chinese Toronto Pageant 2013 1st runner-up |
| Theresa Chan 陳麗欣 | 22 | 5'6" | |
| Vicky Chan 陳惠麒 | 25 | 5'6" | |
| Cherub Chen 陳睿雯 | 23 | 5'7¼" | |
| Vanessa Cheung 張家盈 | 23 | 5'6" | |
| Bowie Cheung 張寶兒 | 24 | 5'5" | |
| Rachel Ching 程 皓 | 23 | 5'4" | |
| Michelle Chung 鍾佩恩 | 22 | 5'7½" | |
| Daisy Dai 代蓮曦丹美 | 23 | 5'7" | |
| Crystal Fung 馮盈盈 | 22 | 5'5" | Winner at Mary Kay Dream Beautiful (Asia Pacific) 2015 |
| Melody Ho 何瑩瑩 | 25 | 5'4½" | |
| Karen Kung 龔佩曄 | 22 | 5'7½" | |
| Angellica Kwan 關可欣 | 25 | 5'7" | |
| Maggie Kwong 鄺美淇 | 22 | 5'4½" | |
| Tiffany Lau 劉穎鏇 | 19 | 5'9" | Overseas delegate from Los Angeles |
| Lindsay Loong 龍洛雯 | 19 | 5'3" | |
| Winky Lui 雷詠琪 | 26 | 5'3" | |
| Nikki Ng 吳芷埼 | 20 | 5'4½" | |
| Joyce Ngai 魏韵芝 | 26 | 5'4" | |
| Phoebe Sin 單文柔 | 26 | 5'6" | |
| Andrea So 蘇韻姿 | 23 | 5'5" | Overseas delegate from Toronto |
| Eunice So 蘇可欣 | 23 | 5'6" | |
| Jacqueline To 杜超洋 | 23 | 5'3½" | |
| Bridget Tse 謝泳思 | 25 | 5'3" | Overseas delegate from Vancouver; Miss Chinese (Vancouver) Pageant 2015 Top 10 Finalist |
| Nicole Wong 黃鍶雅 | 21 | 5'5½" | |
| Beanie Wong 黃 豆 | 22 | 5'6½" | |
| Queenie Wong 黃欣𦲀 | 24 | 5'5" | |
| Peggy Yau 丘雅雯 | 23 | 5'7½" | |
| Sophie Yip 葉蒨文 | 23 | 5'5" | |
| Mandy Yuen 阮嘉敏 | 25 | 5'4" | Face Magazine Ustar 2013 Finalist |

== Elimination chart ==
The rules changed for this year as a knockout competition was used to determine the finalists.

| Contestants | Round 1 (Top 20) (25 Jul) | Round 2 (Top 10) (14 Aug) | Round 3 (Top 4) (11 Sep) | Round 4 (Top 3) (11 Sep) |
|---|---|---|---|---|
| Crystal Fung | Advance | Advance | Advance | Champion |
| Tiffany Lau | Advance | Advance | Advance | 1st runner-up |
| Bonnie Chan | Advance | Advance | Advance | 2nd runner-up |
| Andrea So | Advance | Advance | Advance | Eliminated |
| Cherub Chen | Advance | Advance | Eliminated | |
| Bowie Cheung | Advance | Advance | Eliminated | |
| Daisy Dai | Advance | Advance | Eliminated | |
| Angellica Kwan | Advance | Advance | Eliminated | |
| Phoebe Sin | Advance | Advance | Eliminated | |
| Mandy Yuen | Advance | Advance | Eliminated | |
| Vicky Chan | Advance | Eliminated | | |
| Vanessa Cheung | Advance | Eliminated | | |
| Rachel Ching | Advance | Eliminated | | |
| Melody Ho | Advance | Eliminated | | |
| Winky Lui | Advance | Eliminated | | |
| Joyce Ngai | Advance | Eliminated | | |
| Eunice So | Advance | Eliminated | | |
| Bridget Tse | Advance | Eliminated | | |
| Nicole Wong | Advance | Eliminated | | |
| Peggy Yau | Advance | Eliminated | | |
| Theresa Chan | Eliminated | | | |
| Michelle Chung | Eliminated | | | |
| Karen Kung | Eliminated | | | |
| Maggie Kwong | Eliminated | | | |
| Lindsay Loong | Eliminated | | | |
| Nikki Ng | Eliminated | | | |
| Jacqueline To | Eliminated | | | |
| Beanie Wong | Eliminated | | | |
| Queenie Wong | Eliminated | | | |
| Sophie Yip | Eliminated | | | |

Champion
1st runner-up
2nd runner-up
Advance
Eliminated

== Judges ==
The main results were decided by a combination of public voting via the TVB Fun mobile app and a judging panel consisting of the Miss Hong Kong Pageant Steering Committee and a 24‑member "Star Judge Panel" of TVB artistes.

- Miss Photogenic judging panel:
  - Andy Hui (許志安)
  - Gigi Leung (梁詠琪)
  - Ruco Chan (陳展鵬)
  - Nancy Wu (胡定欣)

== Post-Pageant Notes ==
- Crystal Fung placed as 2nd runner-up in Miss Chinese International Pageant 2017 in Pahang, Malaysia.
