= Off Pedder =

Hong Kong television drama

- Official poster
- 畢打自己人
- Genre: Comedy
- Starring: Teresa Mo; Elaine Jin; Wayne Lai; Elvina Kong; Wong Cho Lam; Aimee Chan; Joyce Cheng; Stephen Au; Tsui Wing; Ivan Ho; Ng Kwun Lai; Chan Hung Lit
- Theme music composer: Mozart
- Opening theme: "Mozart's Serenade No. 13"
- Ending theme: "無人完美" (No One is Perfect) by Joyce Cheng
- Country of origin: Hong Kong
- Original language: Cantonese
- No. of episodes: 337

Production
- Producer: TVB
- Production location: Hong Kong
- Running time: 22 minutes

Original release
- Network: TVB Jade
- Release: October 20, 2008 – February 12, 2010

Related
- Best Selling Secrets; Some Day

Off Pedder
- Traditional Chinese: 畢打自己人
- Simplified Chinese: 畢打自己人
Transcriptions

Off Pedder (Traditional Chinese: 畢打自己人) is a TVB modern drama series broadcast since October 2008 and ended on 12 February 2010.

The sitcom is about office politics in a magazine company, as well as family and romantic relationships amongst the characters, with the majority of the cast from Best Selling Secrets.

== Synopsis ==
Chiu (潮) Magazine is part of the Kam Bo Corporation, and has its offices on Pedder Street in Hong Kong (thus giving rise to the name of the series). The show centres on the politics of the Chiu (潮) and Kam Bo office, and the lives of the characters who work in this office.

Central to the plot are Yan Seung (Teresa Mo), who takes up a position early on in the series as editor of Chiu (潮). The initial plot focused on her rivalry with the Head of Sales, Susan Ka So-Shan (Elaine Jin). As more characters were introduced, the plot expanded to focus on Yim Yue Tai (Stephen Au) and Yu Ka Sing (Wayne Lai). How will these four individuals affect Pedder Street and who will become the ultimate leader of Chiu (潮) Magazine...?

== Episode Guide ==
Episode Number	Title	Description
1	Looking for a job	Seung is hired as the chief editor of Chao Magazine. Her first interview is with Susan, who later takes up a job at Chao as director of sales.
2	First day at work	Seung resigns after her first article for Chao whilst Susan goes to work for the first time and meets Joyce, Marco and Kin. Many workers resign because of Susan.
3	Our Saviour	George begs his daughter Seung to save Chao. She finally agrees and hires a famous writer. However, Susan tries to stop the writer from working at Chao.
4	Around the clock	With one day to the release of a new edition of the magazine, the whole teamwork through the night. Bao goes to order food, meeting Gary, a fashion enthusiast. Seung asks him to be Chao's fashion editor.
5	Fake Calls & Handbags	Susan wants to celebrate the new edition by asking Yim to invite them to dinner, but Yim fakes a phone call to leave. The team writes an article on a shop selling fake handbags with Bao going to investigate.
6	Meeting the Gangster	Seung hires Bao Kwok Yan as an assistant. The team goes out for dinner, Yim takes the leftovers and Bao is responsible for paying. However, in the end he uses the money to help his friends instead.
7	We are Hiring	Both the editorial and sales departments have advertised positions. Susan hires Icy as a sales clerk whilst Seung hires Paula and Tang, both of whom were rejected by Susan.
8	The love of food	Susan applies "legislation 30" to her team. Seung wants to write a health article, but Susan wants to advertise fatty foods. Susan throws out Seung's work documents, Joyce tries to return them, but sees Susan so says she has found tissues. Yim claims they are his.
9	One of a kind	Susan helps Kerry write an article on a world-famous ring as there is only one in the world. However, she breaks it and blames Kerry. Bao, who is in charge of the editorial (whilst Seung is overseas), goes to return the ring.
10	Camera Business	Dang and Paula go to do an interview together because they need the same camera.
11	Money Allowance	Bao meets with the office workers to try to increase the department's money allowance, but realises that the only way to do this is to befriend Kin, but instead he makes mistake causing the department's budget to be reduced.
12	Love for George	Susan stalks George in order to get Jim's record disc, as she is on the front cover, but she fails and the record disc is used in the newest article.
13	All about Marco	Bao needs to rent out his empty room in his house to get money to pay the rent for his house. He ends up renting his room to Marco. Icy says that guy only says “hello, time to see customer and bye”. Bao sleeps during the day because of this and his mates prank him.
14	On line Date	Kin meets an online guy who is interested in her, Bao helps him to chat with her but in the end finds out that he is a con man, who is trying to steal people's money.
15	Addicted to shops	Seung loves shopping and bets George that if she doesn't buy anything for a week George will get the money to buy a new audio system for his bar. However, Yim sends her to a fashion conference, meaning she loses, making George really happy.
16	Joyce gets promoted	The boys try to prank Susan, but make Joyce carry it out. Susan steals a necklace and blames it on Joyce. Later she promotes Joyce
17	George's watch and CoCo	George blames his maid for stealing his watch and kicks her out, however, she later reveals it was a girl named CoCo had taken her home and George had given her his watch.
18	Famous Singer of the 80s	Seung's maid ruins a chance to interview with a famous singer since they once had hated each other.
19	Scandal	Marco wants a famous company to advertise at Chao. However, Gary wants to expose a scandal about the owner.
20	Ben & Jim	George meets with his friends Ben & Jim and Susan ends up hiring them to do an advertisement.
21	Yim's Birthday	Seung takes Yim out for his birthday and he recounts of the time his son taught him a lesson in being cheap.
22	Return it	Yim Yu Tai wants what he owns. Yim keeps on thinking it is the watch he gave him. Turns out he sent the text to the wrong person. Yim wants to celebrate but tells Seung to pay. Seung tells Bao to pay instead.
23	Paula vs Tang	Tang and Paula go to interview an old lady. Tang fails first, so Paula goes. She later accuses him of stealing her microchip with the photos.
24	New mates	Gary moves into Bao's house and Tang is paid by the 3 guys (Bao, Gary and Marco) to do the house chores
25	Tina vs Seung	Tina is trying to make Seung lose her job, so she comes up with a vicious plan. Kin makes Seung sign a contract used as evidence, planned by Tina. Herman helps Seung by texting her a computer file.
26	New camera man	Yim Yu Tai, Yim's son is hired to be the new photographer for Chao. The team test him out for a week. Whilst, Yim and Seung hide overseas for the week, leaving Susan to interview Yu Tai.
27	Yim's Plan	Yu Tai goes to work for the first day and meets his dad, Yim invites Yu Tai, Seung, her dad and also Tina together. Yim tricks Yu Tai into moving in and living with him.
28	Conflict with the camera man	Yu Tai keeps on losing his ID card in order to get Yim to remove the strict ID card rule for employees.
29	Tina vs Kin	The office employees try to make Kin work for them, but fail to get her to join their side.
30	Ella	Susan and George are rumoured to have a daughter Ella together, Seung investigates but will she find out the truth?
31	Exposing the restaurant	Susan helps Paula to make an interview to a restaurant owner. However, Paula wants to review the truth behind the dirty restaurant. Gary pranks Susan in not handing in his work and Marco doesn't finish his on time blaming Joyce for losing his USB. Paula sees this and tries to help Joyce.
32	Gambling is always bad	The 4 boys (Marco, Tang, Bao, Gary) gamble with a man living in Tang's apartment, making the old man lose terribly, but turns out he was a journalist for another magazine trying to steal information.
33	Tang and Kam	Tang makes friends with Lee Yee Kam and Ko Ling. The boys are angry with his relationship and tell Tang to invite the office workers to a party, but Tang pranks them inviting Kam and the older secretaries which shocks everyone.
34	Joyce loses Yim's money	Yim fakes another phone call when the workers decide to have a dinner party, however, Yu Tai uncovers the fake call, meaning Yim ends up paying. Joyce loses the envelope with the money in it and they are unable to get the food in time, but Icy ends up helping them.
35	Suki and the photos	Yip Chee Yeou (Suki), a famous model with Yu Tai taking photos for this edition, however she doesn't let him take them. Later, Seung tells her Yu Tai relationship with his “old wife” and she overhears secretaries talking about his relationship with Yim, prompting Suki to accept taking the photos. Yu Tai says he is still in love with Seung to get Suki to leave.
36	Susan's Ex	Susan gets into a fight with her ex-husband and new girlfriend over the house she is living in.

== Cast ==
=== Chiu(潮) Magazine ===
==== Editorial Department ====
Cast	Role	Description
Teresa Mo	Yan Seung (Ivy) 殷賞	Age 38; Chiu Magazine Chief Editor; Yan Dai-Dak's daughter. Yim Yue-Tai's ex-wife. Bao Kwok-Yan's landlady
Aimee Chan	Chan Bo Lai (Paula) 陳寶拉	Age 23; Chiu Magazine Reporter; Undercover agent
Jim Tang	So Tung Wo (Gary) 蘇同和	Age 25; Chiu Magazine Reporter
Joyce Cheng	Yu Lok Yee (Joyce) 余樂兒	Age 23; Chiu Magazine Sales Clerk; Yu Ka-Sing's younger sister. Transferred to Editorial Department in episode 111
Wong Cho Lam	Tang Lai Kwan 鄧勵軍	Age 25; Chiu Magazine Reporter Trainee; Leaves for Switzerland in episode 253

==== Sales and Marketing Department ====
Cast	Role	Description
Wayne Lai	Yu Ka Sing 余家昇	Age 42; Chiu Magazine Director; Yu Lok-Yee's older brother. Yan Seung's husband Undercover Agent
Elvina Kong	Gam Yiu Kin 金堯堅	Age 33; Chiu Magazine Sales Department Secretary; Leaves in episode 107 with Richard to Brunei to be his secretary Returns to her old position in episode 129 after arbitrarily resigning her position with Richard. Bao Kwok-Yan's lover
Raymond Chiu (趙永洪)	Mok Dik Ko (Marco) 莫迪高	Age 29; Chiu Magazine Sales Clerk; Yip Chee Yeou's (Suki's) boyfriend
Tsui Wing (徐榮)	Bao Kwok Yan 包國仁	Age 37; Chiu Magazine Assistant Chief Editor; Truck Driver; Ex-Gangster; Transferred to Sales Department in episode 113; Gam Yiu-Kin's boyfriend
Celine Ma (馬蹄露)	Lee Yee Kam 李綺琴	Kam Bo (金波) Corporation Accounting Clerk; Ko Wai-Ling's cousin. Gam Yiu-Kin's good friend

==== Design Department ====
Cast	Role	Description
Law Tin Chi (羅天池)	Lu So Oak 勞素岳	Chao Magazine Design Department Head. Lemon's Boyfriend.

=== Kam Bo (金波) Corporation ===
Cast	Role	Description
Chan Hung Lit (Died during production)	Yim Hei (Joe) 閆器	Age 66; Kam Bor (金波) Corporation President; Yim Yue-Tai's father. Wong Lai-Mei's foster father. Died during his business trip to USA (Episode 310)
Stephen Au	Yim Yu Tai 閆汝大	Age 44; Gam Bor (金波) Corporation Vice President; Chao (潮) Magazine Photographer; Yim Hei's son. Wong Lai-Mei's stepbrother. Yan Seung's ex-husband.
Florence Kwok	Wong Lai Mei (Tina) 王麗薇	Age 34; Kam Bor (金波) Corporation Vice-President; Yim Hei's foster daughter. Yim Yue-Tai's stepsister.
Elaine Jin	Ka So San (Susan) 賈素珊	Age 46; Chao Magazine ex Sales Manager; Later becomes Kam Bor (金波) Corporation shareholder.
Lau Kong	Luk Wan Ting 陸雲廷	Kam Bor (金波) Corporation shareholder. Chairman of Luk Gao Kam (六舊金) Corporation; Ka So-Shan's boyfriend. Father of Luk Bing Bing.
Lee Yee Man (李綺雯)	Luk Bing Bing (Icy) 陸冰冰	Age 24; Chao Magazine ex Sales Clerk Left in episode 127 to study at Tsinghua University in Beijing, after meeting David Yeung on Lamma Island; Appearance in episode 300
Chang Tse Sheng	Chow Ching Ming (Ryan) 周政名	. Former American businessman. Legal Counsel of Kam Bor (金波) Corporation. Personal Assistant of Wong Lai-Mei.
Yvonne Ho (何綺雲)	Mak Chau Kuen (June) 麥秋娟	Yim Hei's secretary.
Queenie Chu	Ko Ling 高慧玲	Wong Lai Ming's secretary. Lee Yee-Kam's cousin.
Zoey Sham (岑潔儀)	Apple	Kam Bor (金波) Corporation Richard's secretary; replaces Kin in episode 107 as Chao magazine secretary; then becomes Herman's secretary upon Kin's return in episode 129. Herman's girlfriend.
Helena Wong (黃卓慧)	Mango	Kam Bor (金波) Corporation secretary.
Karen Lee (李焯寧)	Lemon	Kam Bor (金波) Corporation Yim Yu Tai's secretary. Lo So Oak's girlfriend.

=== Yip (葉氏) Family ===
Cast	Role	Description
Yu Chi Ming (餘子明)	Yip Sing Kuen 葉盛權	Ben And Suki's Father. Gam Bor (金波) Corporation shareholder.
Geoffrey Wong (黃子雄)	Yip Bun (Ben) 葉斌	Gam Bor (金波) Corporation shareholder. Yip Sing Kuen's Son. Wong Lai-Mei's Boyfriend. Suki's Big Brother.
Lily Ho (何傲兒)	Yip Chee Yeou (Suki) 葉志如	葉盛權Daughter. Charity Club Holder. Yip Bun's Sister. Mok Dik-Ko's Girlfriend

=== Happy Bar ===
Cast	Role	Description
Ivan Ho (何守信)	Yan Dai Dak (George) 殷大德	Age 58; Happy Bar (好玩吧) Owner/Bartender; Yan Seung's father.
Gregory Lee (李泳豪)	Alex	Happy Bar (好玩吧) Bartender
Mikako Leung (梁珈詠)	Cheung Wai-Miu 章慧妹	Happy Bar (好玩吧) Bartender

=== Other cast ===
Cast	Role	Description
Ng Kwun Lai (吳君麗)	Chung Wan Gai-Ho 鍾溫繼好	Age 60; Yu Lok-Yee and Yu Ka-Sing's aunt. Yan Seung's maid.
Wu Fung	Wu Fung-soul/Chung Tao-chun 胡楓修／鍾濤鎮	Chung Wan Gai-Ho's husband
Susan Tse	Chow Fung-yee 周鳳儀	Yan Sheung's mother
Joyce Koi (蓋鳴暉)	Chan Tak Hei (Linda) 陳得喜	Yu Ka-Sing's friend. Police
Lo Chun Shun (魯振順)	Sung Lei-Chung 宋理忠	Bao(暴) Magazine Editor; Chao (潮) Magazine Ex-Sales Manager
Mary Hon	Law Suet-sin 羅雪仙	Yim Hei's childhood crush. Owner of a Peking Opera studio.
Ching Hor Wai	Luk See-hing 陸詩卿	Superior Officer of Chan Bo-Lai.
Chuk Man Kwan		Regional Manager of Brand Name Boutique.
Raymond Cho	Heung Chong-yan (Chris) 向眾仁	Former Professional CPR Trainer. Medical Doctor; Gam Yiu-Kin's former boyfriend.
Lee Kwok Lun (李國麟)	Yu Kam-tim 余錦添	Former Chief Financial Officer of Kam Bor (金波) Corporation; Fugitive
Felix Lok	So Si-fu 蘇思富	Gary So's father
Rosanne Lui	Chan Cho 陳祖	Gary So's mother
Chow Chung (周驄)	Yim Ying 閆營	Yim Hei's elder brother

== Production notes ==
- On November 24, 2009, actor Chan Hung Lit had a heart attack after filming an episode. He was transported to the Tseung Kwan O Hospital where he died at 7:11 p.m. at the age of 66
- On November 24, 2009 before airing episode 279, there was a ten-second black and white tribute clip for Chan with the captions, "親愛的鴻烈大哥 謝謝您的一切 我們永遠懷念您" ("Dearest Brother Hung Lit. Thank you for everything. We will always miss you.").
- On November 26, 2009, TVB held a meeting and decided Chan's character "Yim Hei" would die of a heart attack like Chan did in real life.
- On December 8, 2009, production was halted for the cast to attend Chan Hung Lit's funeral.
- On January 6, 2010, the tribute episode 310 for Chan entitled "我們的大閆生" ("Our Mr. Yim") was aired.
- On January 7, 2010, Chan Hung Lit was removed from the title sequence.

== Award nominations ==
TVB Anniversary Awards (2009)
Won:

- Most Improved Actress (Aimee Chan)

Nominated:

- Best Drama
- Best Actress (Teresa Mo) Top 5
- Best Supporting Actor (Stephen Au) Top 15
- Best Supporting Actor (Tsui Wing) Top 15
- My Favourite Female Character (Teresa Mo) Top 5
- Most Improved Actor (Raymond Chiu) Top 5
- Most Improved Actor (Jim Tang) Top 5
- Most Improved Actress (Queenie Chu) Top 5

14th Asian Television Awards (2009) Nominated

- BEST COMEDY PROGRAMME

Minpao Weekly Awards 2010 Nominated

- Most Outstanding Actor: Wayne Lai for Yu Ka Sing

== Viewership ratings ==
Weeks 1 to 20

	Week	Episode	Average Points	Peaking Points	References
1	October 20–24, 2008	1 – 5	26	28	
2	October 27–31, 2008	6 – 10	25	27	
3	November 3–7, 2008	11 – 15	24	—	
4	November 10–14, 2008	16 – 20	24	—	
5	November 17–21, 2008	21 – 25	25	—	
6	November 24–28, 2008	26 – 30	25	—	
7	December 1–5, 2008	31 – 35	26	—	
8	December 8–12, 2008	36 – 40	26	—	
9	December 15–19, 2008	41 – 45	23	—	
10	December 22–26, 2008	46 – 50	23	—	
11	December 29, 2008 – January 2, 2009	51 – 55	26	—	
12	January 5–9, 2009	56 – 60	26	—	
13	January 12–16, 2009	61 – 65	26	—	
14	January 19–23, 2009	66 – 70	24	—	
15	January 26–30, 2009	71 – 73	22	—	
16	February 2–6, 2009	74 – 78	27	—	
17	February 9–13, 2009	79 – 83	26	—	
18	February 16–20, 2009	84 – 88	26	—	
19	February 23–27, 2009	89 – 93	26	—	
20	March 2–6, 2009	94 – 98	27	29	

Weeks 21 to 40

	Week	Episode	Average Points	Peaking Points	References
21	March 9–13, 2009	99 – 103	26	—	
22	March 16–20, 2009	104 – 108	25	—	
23	March 23–27, 2009	109 – 113	26	—	
24	March 30 – April 3, 2009	114 – 118	25	—	
25	April 6–10, 2009	119 – 123	23	24	
26	April 13–17, 2009	124 – 128	25	—	
27	April 20–24, 2009	129 – 133	24	—	
28	April 27 – May 1, 2009	134 – 138	25	—	
29	May 4–8, 2009	139 – 143	24	—	
30	May 11–15, 2009	144 – 147	25	—	
31	May 18–22, 2009	148 – 152	25	27	
32	May 25–29, 2009	153 – 156	24	—	
33	June 1–5, 2009	157 – 161	25	—	
34	June 8–12, 2009	162 – 166	25	—	
35	June 15–19, 2009	167 – 171	25	27	
36	June 22–26, 2009	172 – 176	25	—	
37	June 29 – July 3, 2009	177 – 181	24	26	
38	July 6–10, 2009	182 – 186	25	—	
39	July 13–17, 2009	187 – 191	26	—	
40	July 20–24, 2009	192 – 196	25	—	

Weeks 41 to 60

	Week	Episode	Average Points	Peaking Points	References
41	July 27–31, 2009	197 – 201	26	—	
42	August 3–7, 2009	202 – 206	28	—	
43	August 10–14, 2009	207 – 211	26	—	
44	August 18–21, 2009	212 – 215	25	—	
45	August 24–28, 2009	216 – 220	27	—	
46	August 31 – September 4, 2009	221 – 225	28	—	
47	September 7–11, 2009	226 – 230	28	—	
48	September 14–18, 2009	231 – 235	28	—	
49	September 21–25, 2009	236 – 240	26	—	
50	September 28–30, 2009	241 – 243	25	—	
51	October 5–9, 2009	244 – 248	27	—	
52	October 12–16, 2009	249 – 253	27	—	
53	October 20–23, 2009	254 – 257	25	28	
54	October 26–30, 2009	258 – 262	27	—	
55	November 2–6, 2009	263 – 267	26	—	
56	November 9–13, 2009	268 – 272	27	—	
57	November 16–20, 2009	273 – 277	27	—	
58	November 23–27, 2009	278 – 282	27	—	
59	November 30 – December 4, 2009	283 – 287	27	—	
60	December 7–11, 2009	288 – 292	26	—	

Weeks 61 to 68

	Week	Episode	Average Points	Peaking Points	References
61	December 14–18, 2009	293 – 297	26	—	
62	December 21–25, 2009	298 – 302	23	—	
63	December 28, 2009 – January 1, 2010	303 – 307	25	—	
64	January 4–8, 2010	308 – 312	26	—	
65	January 11–15, 2010	313 – 317	27	—	
66	January 18–22, 2010	318 – 322	26	—	
67	January 25–29, 2010	323 – 327	27	—	
68	February 1–5, 2010	328 – 332	26	—	
68	February 8–12, 2010	333 – 337	24	—	
