= Christine Ng =

Hong Kong–based actress and singer (born 1969)

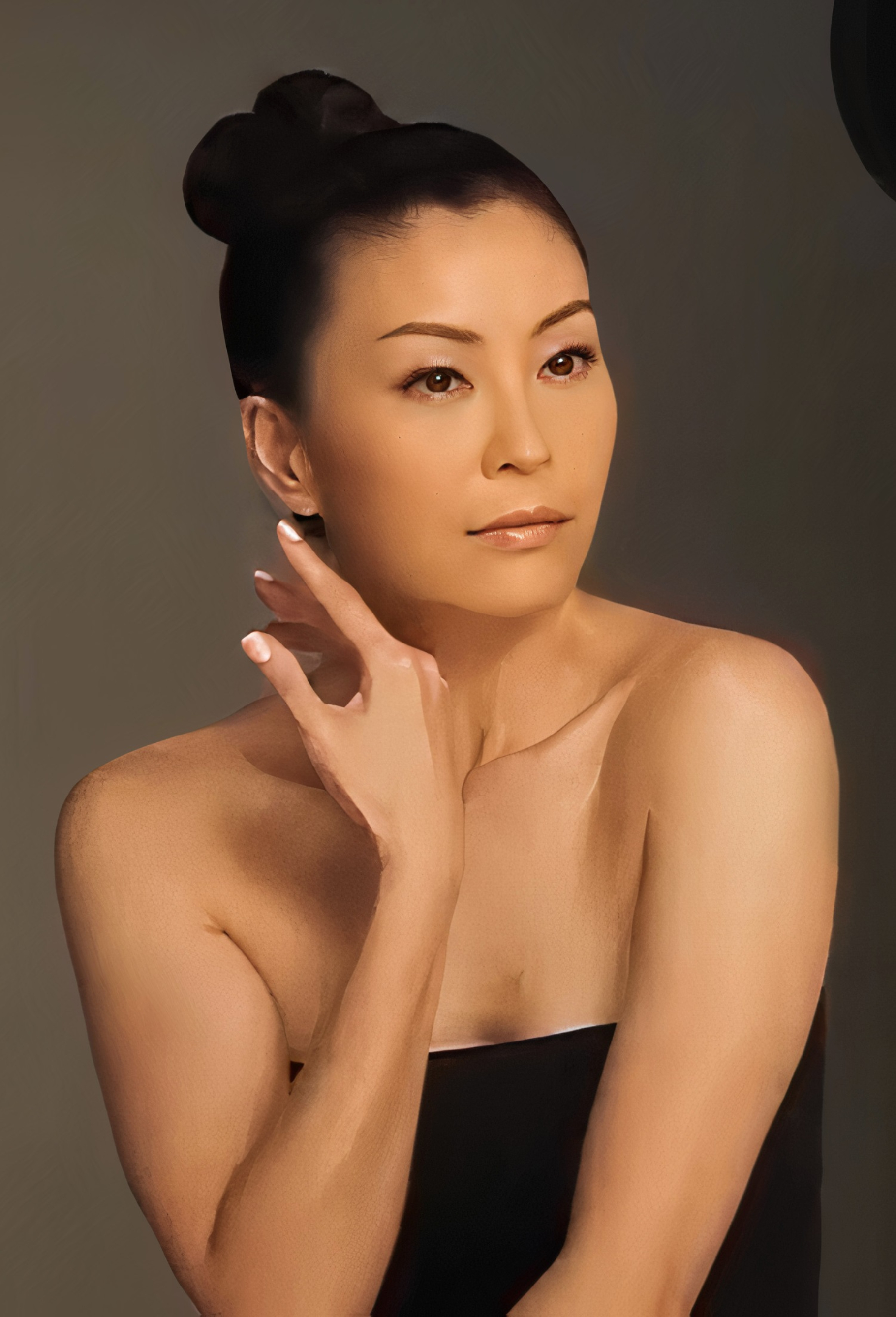
- Ng in 2011
- Born: 24 February 1969 (age 57); British Hong Kong
- Occupations: Actress; singer
- Years active: 1989–present
- Spouses: Yung Kwong Pui (m. 1990; died 1990) Lin Hoi Tong (m. 1999)

Chinese name
- Traditional Chinese: 伍詠薇
- Simplified Chinese: 伍咏薇
Transcriptions
Standard Mandarin
- Hanyu Pinyin: Wú Yǒng wēi
Yue: Cantonese
- Jyutping: Ng5 Wing6 Mei4
- Musical career
- Also known as: Miss Ng (伍姑娘; Ng Koo Leung)

Christine Ng Wing-mei (Chinese: 伍詠薇; born 24 February 1969) is an actress and singer based on Hong Kong. She was under contract to Hong Kong's TVB and ATV. She is known for her roles in TVB's dramas including C.I.B. Files and The Silver Chamber of Sorrows.

== Career ==
Ng competed in the 1989 Miss Asia Pageant and won Miss Photogenic, finishing as third runner-up.

In December 1990, at age 21, Ng married her first husband Yung Kwong Pui (翁江培) who was 30 years older. Only 13 days into their marriage, Yung died of a heart attack. He had been a high standing partner at the Hong Kong office of Ernst & Young and had accumulated a large fortune. He left Ng $170 million (HKD) in his will. Since Yung had died in China, his will was contested by family members for a lengthy period. In 2000, Ng was awarded $9 million. For many years, she suffered from depression due to negative rumors that she was a "black widow" who had brought bad luck to her late husband, which hurt her success with ATV. She did successfully revive her career after moving to TVB.

In 1999 she met her current husband Kasey Lin Hoi Tong (练海棠) through Gigi Lai, and they married in July 1999 in Vancouver.

== Filmography ==
=== Television dramas ===
| Year | Title | Role | Network | Notes/Ref. |
|---|---|---|---|---|
| 1989 | Hey, Big Brother 《司機大佬》 | 方小圓 | ATV | |
| 1990 | Heaven's Retribution | | ATV | |
| 1991 | Days of Glory 《豪門》 | 夏麗珠 / 夏帆 | ATV | |
| 1991 | Rebuilding Prosperity 《再造繁榮》 | 洛順 | ATV | |
| 1992 | Casanova in China 《伯虎為卿狂》 | 慕容秋 / 秋香 | ATV | |
| 1992 | Who is the Winner II 《勝者為王II 之天下無敵》 | 伶俐 | ATV | |
| 1993 | Silver Tycoon 《銀狐》 | 顏如玉 | ATV | |
| 1993 | Police Story II 《皇家警察實錄》 | | ATV | |
| 1993 | Who is the Winner III 《勝者為王III 之王者之戰》 | 伶俐 | ATV | |
| 1994 | Movie Tycoon 《戲王之王》 | 程小曼 | ATV | |
| 1996 | Cold Blood Warm Heart 《天地男兒》 | Luo Hui Fang 羅惠芳 | TVB | |
| 2000 | Incurable Traits 《醫神華佗》 | 張妙心 | TVB | |
| 2000 | Ups and Downs 《無業樓民》 | 羅繡蘭 | TVB | |
| 2000 | Lost in Love 《大囍之家》 | 高嵐 | TVB | |
| 2004 | Twin of Brothers 《大唐雙龍傳》 | Fu Guan Chek / Fu Guan Yu 傅君婥／傅君瑜 | TVB | |
| 2005 | Misleading Track 《奪命真夫》 | Sheh So-Sum 余素心 (Susan) | TVB | |
| 2005 | Wars of In-laws 《我的野蠻奶奶》 | Lung Hao-Hao 龍巧巧 | TVB | Nominated – Best Supporting Actress (Top 5) |
| 2005 | Women on the Run 《窈窕熟女》 | Chan Bong-Nei 陳邦妮 (Bonnie) | TVB | |
| 2006 | Greed Mask 《謎情家族》 | 司徒珊 | TVB | |
| 2006 | Welcome to the House 《高朋滿座》 | Cheung Yuet-Moon 章悅滿 (Frances) | TVB | |
| 2006 | C.I.B. Files 《刑事情報科》 | Ching Mei-Lai 程美麗 (Emily) | TVB | Nominated – Best Actress (Top 20); Nominated – My Favourite Female Character (Top 20) |
| 2006 | Hope for Sale 《街市的童話》 | 蘇由美 | TVB | |
| 2007 | The Green Grass of Home 《緣來自有機》 | Yip Moon-Chi 葉滿枝 (Stella) | TVB | Nominated – Best Actress (Top 20); Nominated – My Favourite Female Character (Top 20) |
| 2007 | The Building Blocks of Life 《建築有情天》 | Ching Wai-Yee 程慧儀 (Winnie) | TVB | |
| 2008 | The Silver Chamber of Sorrows 《銀樓金粉》 | Cheng Sau Hang 程秀杏 | TVB | Nominated – My Favourite Female Character (Top 10) |
| 2009 | The Stew of Life 《有營煮婦》 | Lo Siu Mei 魯小美 (May/ Miss.Lo) | TVB | Nominated – Best Supporting Actress (Top 15); Nominated – My Favourite Female Character (Top 15) |
| 2009 | The Beauty of the Game 《美麗高解像》 | Keung Chin-fung 姜展鳳 | TVB | |
| 2010 | The Comeback Clan 《翻叮一族》 | Lei Yung-chi | TVB | |
| 2013 | Beauty at War 《金枝慾孽貳》 | | TVB | |
| 2013 | Will Power 《法外風雲》 | | TVB | |
| 2018 | Flying Tiger 《飛虎之潛行極戰》 | Lo Man-na | Shaw Brothers Pictures | |
| 2022 | Barrack O'Karma 1968 《金宵大廈2》 | Lee Shuk-fun / Mrs Man | TVB | |

=== Television shows ===
| Year | Title | Network | Role | Note |
|---|---|---|---|---|
| 2017 | My First Direct | ViuTV | Host | |
| 2020 | Happy Half Hour | ViuTV | Host | |
| 2023 | King Maker V | ViuTV | Judge | |

=== Film ===
| Year | Title | Role | Notes/Ref. |
|---|---|---|---|
| 1990 | No Risk No Gain (至尊计状元财) | Maureen | |
| 1992 | The Cat (卫斯理之老猫) | Lara (白素) | |
| 1993 | Crime Story (重案组) | 嘉嘉 | |
| 1993 | Police Story II (皇家警察实录2) | | |
| 1994 | He & She (姊妹情深) | Kwok wai-wai | |
| 1994 | A Taste of Killing and Romance (杀手的童话) | ICE | |
| 1994 | I Wanna Be You Man (神探摩轮) | Susan (黄雪生) | |
| 1994 | 点指兵兵之青年干探 | Maggie | |
| 1995 | 炸弹情人 | Anna Ngok | |
| 1995 | Just Married (横纹刀劈纽纹柴) | Barbara | |
| 1995 | Passion Unbounded (四级杀人狂) | Pak Yu-Seung | |
| 1995 | The Age of Miracles (嫲嫲·帆帆) | May | |
| 1995 | Highway Man/Road Heroes II: Illegal Car Racing (马路英雄II非法赛车) | Mandy | |
| 1996 | Queer Story (基老四十) | 谈丽泉 | |
| 1996 | 国产雪蛤威龙 | Mona | |
| 1996 | Banana Club (正牌香蕉俱樂部) | | |
| 1996 | Feel 100% (百份百感覺) | Rachel | |
| 1997 | 冲上九重天 | Joey Yick (易祖慧) | |
| 1997 | 喜气逼人/爱在香港 | 京京 | |
| 1997 | All's Well, Ends Well 1997 (家有喜事1997) | 贤淑 | |
| 1997 | Troublesome Night (阴阳路) | May | |
| 1997 | Troublesome Night 2 (阴阳路之我在你左右) | Miu (阿妙) | |
| 1997 | The Wedding Days (完全结婚手册) | May | |
| 1997 | 完全摧花手册 | Moony (月亮) | |
| 1997 | 误人子弟 | 伍老师 | |
| 1997 | 飞一般爱情小说 | Sebrina | |
| 1998 | Troublesome Night 3 (阴阳路之升棺发财) | Gigi (张小姐) | |
| 1998 | 全职大盗 | 三诺 | |
| 1998 | 失业特工队 | 伍姑娘 | |
| 1998 | Rush Hour (火拼時速) | Stewardess | |
| 1998 | Wipe Out (诡计) | | |
| 1998 | 戏迷狂情 | | |
| 1998 | 风流三壮士 | Master Tak's Mother | |
| 1998 | 9413 | Carem Leung (卡文) | |
| 1998 | The Storm Riders (风云之雄霸天下) | Ying (颜盈) | |
| 1999 | Fascination Amour (爱情命运号) | Rose | |
| 1999 | The Doctor in Spite of Himself (医神) | 蜜枣 | |
| 1999 | Magnificent Team (非常警察) | | |
| 1999 | The Accident (心猿意马) | | |
| 1999 | 阴魂不散 | 王敏德的太太 | |
| 1999 | 自杀前十四天 | 伍太太 | |
| 2000 | 少女党 | Ivy's mum (Ivy 的母亲) | |
| 2000 | High K (街女) | Jane | |
| 2001 | 荒岛余生 | 杨宝儿 | |
| 2002 | The Replacement Suspects (困兽) | 李美芳 | |
| 2002 | 魂魄唔齐 | Jean | |
| 2004 | 致命赎金 | | |
| 2004 | 女人香气 SHE | | |
| 2005 | Magic Sword of Heaven and Earth (天地神劍) | Qing'er | |
| 2014 | Lan Kwai Fong 3 | | |
| 2016 | Fooling Around Jiang Hu | | |
| 2018 | Rhapsody of Kidnapping | | |
| 2020 | Breakout Brothers | | |

== Other shows ==
- Strictly Come Dancing Season 2《舞动奇迹-第二季》- TVB/Hunan TV dance competition (2008)
