= Legend of Love =

Legend of Love may refer to:

- Legend of Love (film), a 1950 historical drama film
- Legend of Love (ballet), a 1961 ballet composed by Arif Malikov and choreographed by Yury Grigorovich
- The Legend of Love (牛郎織女), a 2002/2003 drama by Television Broadcasts Limited
