= Tsui Wing =

Hong Kong actor

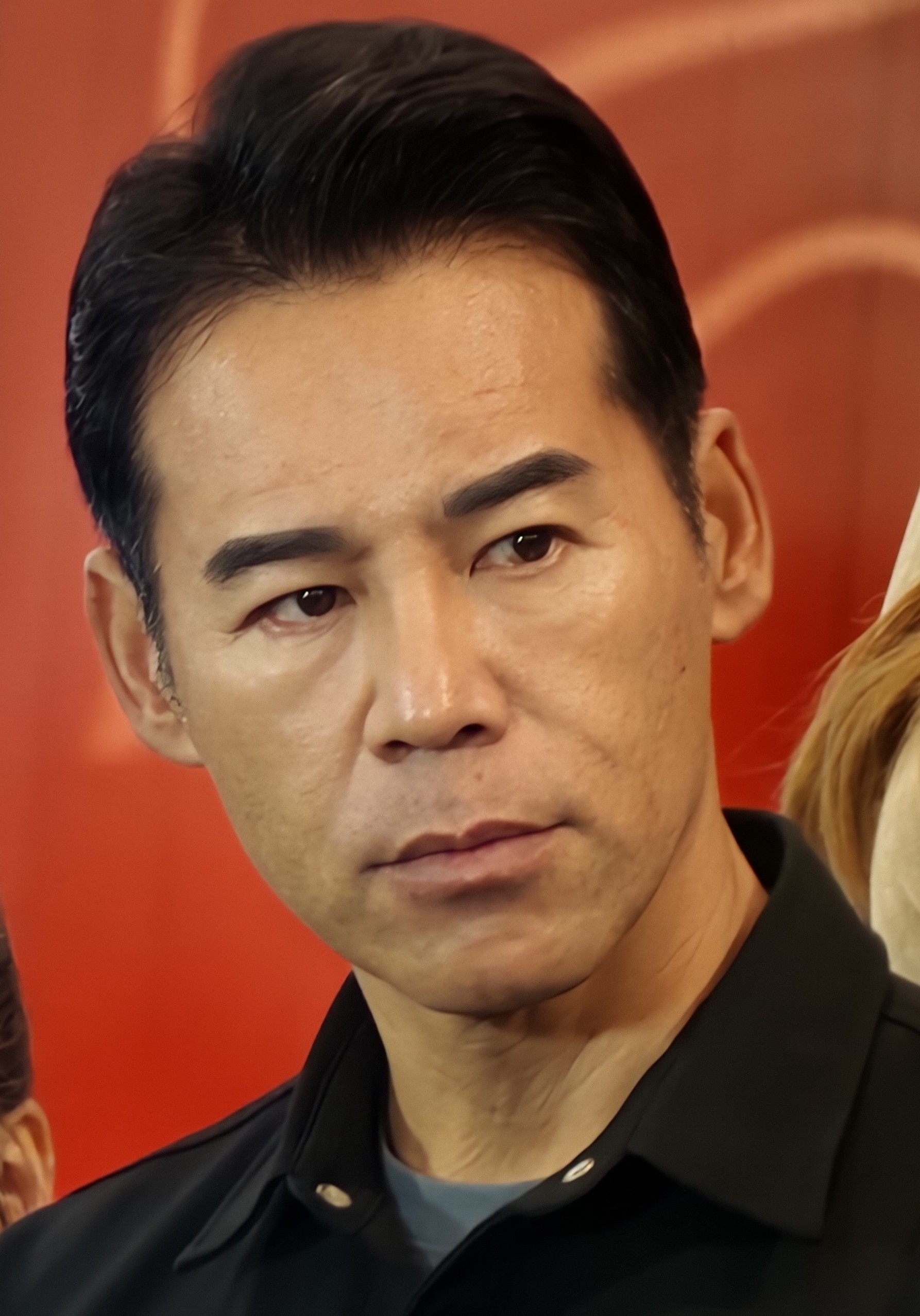
- Tsui in November 2025
- Born: 7 August 1974 (age 52); Hong Kong
- Occupation: Actor
- Years active: 1999–present
- Notable work: Best Selling Secrets; Come Home Love

Chinese name
- Traditional Chinese: 徐榮
Transcriptions
Standard Mandarin
- Hanyu Pinyin: Xú Róng

Tsui Wing (born August 7, 1974) is a Hong Kong actor contracted to TVB.

Tsui is best known for his roles as "Kau Chun" in the 2007–2008 sitcom Best Selling Secrets and "Ma Keung" in the 2012–2015 sitcom Come Home Love.

== Filmography ==
=== Television dramas ===
Year	Title	Role	Notes/Ref.
1999	At the Threshold of an Era	ICAC Officer	
2003	Triumph in the Skies	Taiwan Tour Leader	
2003	Vigilante Force		
2004	Net Deception		
2004	The Conqueror's Story		
2005	Into Thin Air		
2005	Revolving Doors of Vengeance	Police officer	
2005	The Academy		
2005	Misleading Track		
2006	Placebo Cure		
2006	The Dance of Passion	Yim Kwok-Gei 閻國基	
2006	Forensic Heroes		
2006	La Femme Desperado		
2007	The Ultimate Crime Fighter		
2007	The Drive of Life		
2007	On the First Beat		
2007	The Family Link		
2007-2008	Best Selling Secrets	Kau Chun 裘俊	Nominated - TVB Anniversary Award for Best Supporting Actor (2007); Nominated - TVB Anniversary Award for Best Supporting Actor (2008); Nominated - TVB Anniversary Award for Most Improved Male Artiste (2008)
2008	D.I.E.		Nominated - TVB Anniversary Award for Most Improved Male Artiste
2008-2010	Off Pedder	Bao Kwok-yan 包國仁	Nominated - TVB Anniversary Award for Best Supporting Actor
2010	Every Move You Make	Ching Sau-yip 程守業	
2010	Can't Buy Me Love	Uncle Bo 寶叔	
2010	Some Day	Kwok Wai-lung 郭偉龍	Nominated - TVB Anniversary Award for My Favourite Male Character
2011	The Life and Times of a Sentinel	Sheung-ning, Fifth Imperial Prince 五皇爺常寧	
2011	Super Snoops	Lee Tai-chai 李打豺	
2011-2012	When Heaven Burns	Arthur	
2012	Gloves Come Off		
2012	The Confidant	Guwalgiya Sing-po	
2012	The Last Steep Ascent	Kwan Kwong-tat 關廣達	
2012-2015	Come Home Love	Ma Keung 馬強; Ma Kin 馬健	Main Role
2016	House of Spirits	Mui Chiu 梅昭	
2016	Brother's Keeper II	Terri Ma Man-tai 馬文泰	
2017	Time Travelling Officials	Cheuk Wah/Samuel	
2018	Who Wants A Baby	Yip Chi-yuen	Major Supporting Role
2018	The Learning Curve of a Warlord	Law Yi 羅義	Major Supporting Role
2019	The Ghetto-Fabulous Lady	Tik Tak-ying 狄德英	Main Role
2020	The Dripping Sauce	Man Kai-kong 萬啟江	Supporting Role
2020	The Exorcist’s 2nd Meter	Tony Tsui Tung-yin 徐東然	Guest Appearance in Ep. 12
2020	Al Cappuccino	Chung Chi-sum 鍾志琛	Major Supporting Role
2020	The Witness	Gordon Yip Ming-kwan 葉明鈞	Major Supporting Role
2020	Line Walker: Bull Fight	himself	Guest Star (episode 27)
2021	Battle Of The Seven Sisters	Gordon Wong Nam 王男; Chui Ming-hin 崔銘軒	Major Supporting Role Nominated - TVB Anniversary Award for Best Supporting Actor Nominated - TVB Anniversary Award for Most Popular Male Character (Top 10)
2021	The Kwoks And What	Ben Ho Ching-fung 何正峰	Major Supporting Role
2021	Flying Tiger 3	Dr. Ching Chung-yan 程頌昕	Guest Appearance
2022	Stranger Anniversary	Koo Lik-chi 古烈治	Major Supporting Role
2022	Communion	Ma Chi-to 馬志圖	Major Supporting Role Nominated - TVB Anniversary Award for Best Supporting Actor Nominated - TVB Anniversary Award for Most Popular Male Character
2022	The Perfect Man	Ha Chung-chau 夏中秋	Major Supporting Role Nominated - TVB Anniversary Award for Best Supporting Actor
2023	Golden Bowl	Cheung Chi-ming 張志明	Supporting Role
2023	Secret Door	Chong Chun-nam 莊振南	Guest Appearance
2023	My Pet, My Angel	"CT" To Chi-tak 杜志德	Major Supporting Role Nominated - TVB Anniversary Award for Best Supporting Actor
2023	Romeo and Ying Tai	Ma Man-choi 馬文才	Supporting Role
2024	The Airport Diary	Lee Shing-cheung 李勝祥	Major Supporting Role
2024	In Bed With A Stranger	Lo Ching-fai 魯正輝	Major Supporting Role
2025	The Fading Gold	Darren Kwok Wai-leung	
