= Elvina Kong =

Hong Kong television actress and presenter

- Born: Kong Yan-yin; 6 July 1967 (age 59); British Hong Kong
- Years active: 1985–present
- Spouse: Jackson Ng (m. 2001; div. 2013)
- Family: Liz Kong (sister)

Elvina Kong Yan-yin (Chinese: 江欣燕; born 6 July 1967) is a Hong Kong television actress and presenter currently under contract to TVB.

== Background ==
Kong was born in British Hong Kong on 6 July 1967. She was a finalist in the New Talent Singing Contest 1985 run by TVB. She sang chorus "Goodbye Puppy Love" alone. Her performance impressed TVB and was offered a contract despite winning no awards.

She played the role of Gam Yiu-kin in the sitcom Off Pedder from 2008 to 2010. She also played the role of Diana Man in the TVB sitcom Best Selling Secrets from 2007 to 2008.

Her sister Liz Kong was also an actress and is in a relationship with barrister Alan Hoo SC.

== Personal life ==
Kong was once in a brief relationship with another Hong Kong actor Dicky Cheung for 5 years in the late 1980s.

Kong was married for 12 years with Jackson Ng. In 2013, Kong filed for divorce.

== Filmography ==
- Police Story 2 (1988)
- Miracles (1989)
- The Iceman Cometh (1989)
- Crocodile Hunter (1989)
- Funny Ghost (1989)
- Vampire Settle on Police Camp (1990)
- The Revenge of Angel (1990)
- The Other Half (1990)
- In the Line of Duty 5 (1990)
- The Spooky Family (1990)
- License to Steal (1990)
- Family Day (1990)
- To Be Number One (1991)
- Money and Fame (1992)
- Vampire Family (1993)
- The Buddhism Palm Strikes Back (1993)
- Right Here Waiting (1994)
- Two Girls' Faced (1995)
- Sixty Million Dollar Man (1995)
- I Want to Live on (1995)
- Tristar (1996)
- Forbidden City Cop (1996)
- Banana Club (1996)
- Those Were the Days (1997)
- Hunting Evil Spirit (1999)
- Lord of Amusement (1999)
- China's Next Top Princess (2005)
- Men Suddenly in Black 2 (2006)
- Best Selling Secrets (2007–2008) (TVB series)
- Off Pedder (2008–2010) (TVB series)
- Super Snoops (2011) (TVB series)
- Let It Be Love (2012) (TVB series)
- I Love Hong Kong 2012 (2012)
- I Love Hong Kong 2013 (2013)
- Never Dance Alone (2014) (TVB series)
- Inspector Gourmet (2016) (TVB series)
- Brutally Young (2020) (TVB series)
