= Don't Fool Me =

1991 Hong Kong film by Herman Yau

- Laserdisc cover
- Traditional Chinese: 中環英雄
- Simplified Chinese: 中环英雄
- Hanyu Pinyin: Zhōng Huán Yīng Xióng
- Jyutping: Zung1 Waan4 Jing1 Hung4
- Directed by: Herman Yau
- Written by: Rico Chung; Lam Chiu-wing
- Produced by: Taylor Wong
- Starring: Andy Lau; Tony Leung; Teresa Mo; Fennie Yuen
- Cinematography: Puccini Yu
- Edited by: Ma Chung-yiu
- Music by: Shui Jing-mai
- Production company: Wing Fat Film Production
- Distributed by: D&B Films Distribution
- Release date: 2 March 1991
- Running time: 98 minutes
- Country: Hong Kong
- Language: Cantonese
- Box office: HK$13,402,221

Don't Fool Me (Chinese: 中環英雄, lit. Hero of Central) is a 1991 Hong Kong action comedy film directed by Herman Yau and starring Andy Lau, Tony Leung, Teresa Mo and Fennie Yuen.

== Plot ==
Hero Wah and Cheung Ho-kit star are two old friends who meet up later in life. Hero is a Triad gang member and Kit is an insurance salesman. Hero is looking for a career change and Kit has become disillusioned with life after discovering he has a "bubble" in his brain that could burst at any time killing him. The two decide to switch lives for a bit with the Triad going respectable and the insurance salesman taking on the world of the Triads. As well as a new life, both friends find new love.

== Cast ==
- Andy Lau as Hero Wah
- Tony Leung Chiu-wai as Cheung Ho-kit
- Teresa Mo as Miss Mui
- Fennie Yuen as Fanny
- Charine Chan as Margaret
- Michael Chan as Fanny's father
- Shing Fui-On as Mad Po
- Tien Feng as Yip Chi-mei
- Anthony Wong as Su, Turtle's Brother
- Gabriel Wong as Turtle
- Stuart Ong as Mister Yung
- Yau Kin-kwok as Kung Fu bodyguard
- Jeffrey Lam as Big Brother in bar
- Chow Mei-yan as TV reporter
- Sin Kwok-wah
- Hoi Sang Lee as Big Mouth
- Leung Sap-yat
- Shui Jing-mai
- Wong Chi-keung as Chiuchow boss
- Au Siu-hei
- Kam Yat-lung
- Nip Pang-fung
- Bruce Law as Brother Nut
- James Ha as Mad Po's thug
- Tsang Kan-wing as Senior police officer
- Sham Chin-po as robber
- Hau Woon-ling as Temple medium
- Garry Chan as angry driver
- Chan King as casino clerk
- Anthony Cho as rascal
- Steve Mak as rascal
- Choi Kwok-keung as robber
- Ho Wing-cheung as robber
- Fung Man-kwong as robber

== Theme song ==
- "End of Fate" (緣盡)
  - Composer: Lowell Lo
  - Lyricist: Calvin Poon
  - Singer: Andy Lau

== Box office ==
This film grossed HK$13,402,221 at the Hong Kong box office during its theatrical run from 2 to 22 March 1991 in Hong Kong.

== See also ==
- Andy Lau filmography
