= Amanda Lee (actress) =

Hong Kong pop singer and actress

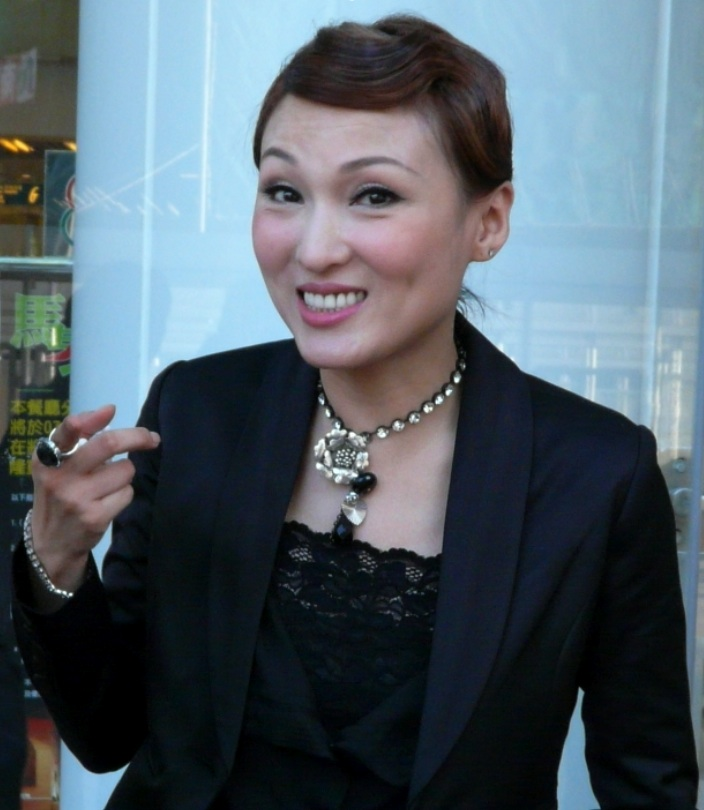
- Lee in 2008
- Traditional Chinese: 李蕙敏
Transcriptions
Yue: Cantonese
- Yale Romanization: Léih Waih-máhn
- Jyutping: Lei5 Wai6-man5

Amanda Lee Wai-man (born 4 October 1970) is a Hong Kong pop singer.

== Personal life ==
Amanda Lee (Chinese: 李惠敏), born in Hong Kong, her ancestral hometown is Sanshui (三水) district, Foshan, China. In October 2013, Lee married her British boyfriend of three years, Serge Micallef, a banker at Bank of New York Mellon. Lyricist Wyman Wong stood in place of her father to walk her down the aisle.

== Career ==
Amanda Lee once revealed on a TV show in her ancestral home in Sanshui District. When she was 15 years old, Lee participated in the SING Star Voice Singing Competition on a TVB Jade's program named Enjoy Yourself Tonight. She sang Anita Mui's songs in this competition and was then discovered by a famous singer-songwriter Anthony Lun Wing Leung. Lee started her singing career at the age of 17, which coincided with the Hong Kong music scene in the late 1980s.

== Filmography ==
- An Inspector Calls (2015)
- The Haunted School (2007) - Miss Fong
- House of Mahjong (2007)
- Cocktail (2006)
- Ronin Boys (2005) - Amanda Fong
- Forever Yours (2004)
- Fate Fighter (2003)
- City of SARS (2003)
- My Sassy Boyfriend (2003) - Kuen
- Give Them a Chance (2003)
- Modern Cinderella (2002)
- Women from Mars (2002)
- Happy Family (2002) - Kaka's Mum
- Nine Girls and a Ghost (2002)
- Blue Moon (2001)
- Human Pork Chop (2001)
- Sworn Revenge (2000) - May Chan
- Troublesome Night 7 (2000) - Amanda
- The Untold Story III (1999)
- The Kid (1999)
- Last Ghost Standing (1999) - Snack Bar Vendor
- Troublesome Night 6 (1999) - Cheung Mo
- Troublesome Night 5 (1999)
- 9413 (1998) .... Mandy
- Magnificent Team (1998) - Madam Fong
- Ninth Happiness (1998) - Maid
- Troublesome Night 2 (1997) - Anita
- Full Alert (1997) - Chung Lai-Hung
- Love: Amoeba Style (1997) - Ching Ga Mei
- All's Well, Ends Well 1997 (1997) - Monalisa Kam
- The Story of Movie (1996) - Cat
- Best of the Best (1996) - Amanda
- Shanghai Grand (1996) (as Amanda W.M. Lee) - Lai-Man
- Those Were the Days (1996) - Informant
- Banana Club (1996) - Mad
- I'm Your Birthday Cake! (1995) - Sorry
- Hong Kong Graffiti (1995) (uncredited) - Anita Li
- School on Fire (1989)
