= Happy Family (2002 film) =

2002 Hong Kong film by Herman Yau

- Film poster
- Traditional Chinese: 風流家族
- Simplified Chinese: 风流家族
- Hanyu Pinyin: Fēngliú Jiāzú
- Jyutping: Fung1lau4 Gaa1zuk6
- Directed by: Herman Yau
- Screenplay by: Ng Kin-hung
- Produced by: Herman Yau; Yeung Yee-shan
- Starring: Nick Cheung; Candy Lo; Kenny Bee; Cecilia Yip; Amanda Lee
- Cinematography: Puccini Yu
- Edited by: Robert Choi
- Music by: Mak Chun Hung
- Production companies: Mandarin Films; Buddy Film Creative Workshop
- Distributed by: Wide Sight Entertainment
- Release date: 7 March 2002
- Running time: 100 minutes
- Country: Hong Kong
- Language: Cantonese
- Box office: HK$287,996

Happy Family is a 2002 Hong Kong romantic comedy film directed by Herman Yau and starring Nick Cheung, Candy Lo and Kenny Bee.

== Plot ==
Small Han Sang (Nick Cheung) works in a top position at his father's (Kenny Bee) real estate company. His father does not interfere often but during a period of interviewing new applicants, his father has personally recommended Kaka (Candy Lo), who in the end, gets a job at the company. A good worker and a good bond between Sang and Kaka is created, even to the point of love and plans of marriage. However, Mr. Han later drops the bomb that Kaka is actually Sang's sister.

== Cast and roles ==
- Nick Cheung as Sang
- Candy Lo as Kaka
- Kenny Bee as Mr. Han
- Cecilia Yip as Mrs. Han
- Amanda Lee as Kaka's mom
- Chan Man-man
- Alfred Cheung as Director Cheung
- Fennie Yuen as Psychiatrist
- Almen Wong as Pig Yik
- Tats Lau as Kei
- Wilson Yip as Police negotiator
- Matt Chow as Mr. Han's housekeeper
- Simon Lui as Kaka's dad
- Monica Lo
- Emily Kwan (關寶慧) as TV Reporter
- Iris Chai
- Thomas Lam as Harry
- Marco Mak as Applicant for director's job
- Sherman Wong as Applicant for director's job
- Jackie Ma
- Herman Yau as Applicant for director's job
- Sharon Chan as Sabrina
- Mak Chun Hung as Guitar player at jazz club
- Leo Lo
- Ricky Fan as Bass guitar player at jazz club
