= 2 Young =

2005 Hong Kong film by Derek Yee

- Theatrical release poster
- Directed by: Derek Yee
- Written by: Derek Yee; Chun Tin-nam
- Produced by: Henry Fong; Huang Jianxin
- Starring: Jaycee Chan; Fiona Sit
- Cinematography: Chan Wai-nin; Keung Kwok-man
- Edited by: Kwong Chi-leung
- Music by: Peter Kam
- Distributed by: Sil-Metropole Organisation
- Release date: 28 April 2005
- Running time: 107 minutes
- Country: Hong Kong
- Language: Cantonese

2 Young (Chinese: 早熟) is a 2005 Hong Kong romantic comedy-drama film directed by Derek Yee. The film was released in mainland China on 15 April 2005 and in Hong Kong on 28 April 2005.

2 Young stars Jaycee Chan and Fiona Sit with a supporting cast including Eric Tsang, Teresa Mo, Anthony Wong, and Candice Yu, who play the parents of Jaycee's and Fiona's characters respectively.

== Plot ==
Ka Fu (Jaycee Chan) and Natalie (Nam) (Fiona Sit), are from two different family backgrounds. Ka Fu's father (played by Eric Tsang) is a mini-bus driver and his mother (played by Teresa Mo) is a restaurant hostess. Natalie is from a very affluent family and her parents (played by Candice Yu and Anthony Wong) are lawyers. In the beginning, Ka Fu and his two close friends, Bing and Sai wait to see Natalie outside her school every single day until she invited them to her school's Christmas party despite knowing that visitors were forbidden to go. They were eventually discovered by the school principals. While Bing and Sai successfully escaped, Ka Fu was caught but they decided to forgive him. Ka Fu took Natalie home, where they celebrated her 16th birthday, and Ka Fu spent the night there.

Another contrast is that Ka Fu has a loving relationship with his parents, but Natalie's relationship with her parents is distant as they are often away on business trips. Eventually, Ka Fu and Natalie gotten close with each other as they got to know each other more. It is exactly this window of opportunity of Natalie's parents' absence that causes the two to have a weak moment in their budding love for each other, which results in Natalie getting pregnant during a camp out for New Year's Eve. Natalie eventually found out herself when her pregnancy test came back positive.

Originally, they thought about getting an abortion in order to take care of the problem after getting an advice from Sai but upon seeing the operation room, Natalie decided not to and ran out in horror. Despite her anxiety of this issue, she decides to go through with the pregnancy in complete support from Ka Fu, along with Bing and Sai. However, Natalie, being underage and about two years younger than Ka Fu, causes her parents, especially her father, to fly into a rage and a lawsuit gets under way for Ka Fu and his parents. Ka Fu's parents also scold him and express that they do not want him to make the same mistakes they did. Upon knowing her pregnancy, Natalie's father's plan was for her to get an abortion, and send her to the United States to continue with her education, which Natalie aggressively objected, and she scolded her father for always making decisions for her. Her father gets angry and canceled her bank account, internet services and her cell phone. He ordered his wife to be at home and watch over her 24/7.

Learning of the impending legal action, and also because of the plan on aborting the baby, Ka Fu and Natalie, with the help of Bing and Sai, run away and make out a living for themselves in the countryside, where Sai used to live. Ka Fu worked in various jobs such as construction to make money to support themselves while Natalie stays home. Because of Natalie's father, Ka Fu made the headlines, depicting him as a rapist that kidnapped Natalie. Therefore, making Ka Fu a wanted person. The young lovers are eventually discovered by Ka Fu's parents after they forced Bing and Sai to tell them. When Natalie goes into early labor, they are forced to return to the city, where she gives birth to a baby boy (prematurely, although the baby survives) and Ka Fu is arrested. During the court scene, the relationships of the parents and their son and daughter are resolved as Natalie's father decided to let it go for the sake of the baby. During court, he revealed that he gave false information to the police about Natalie being underage due to his anger and prejudice towards Ka Fu. He eventually realized that even though Ka Fu got his daughter pregnant, he did try to make up his responsibility as he truly loves Natalie so he asked the judge to release him. Ka Fu was also sentenced to 3 months in a rehabilitation center for his actions. Upon his release, he is greeted by Natalie and their child.

== Cast ==
- Jaycee Chan
- Fiona Sit
- Anthony Wong
- Eric Tsang
- Teresa Mo
- Candice Yu
- David Chiang
- Chin Kar Lok
- Benz Hui
- Raymond Tso
- James Ha
- Lam Suet
- Henry Fong
- Jamie Luk

== Awards and nominations ==
25th Hong Kong Film Awards

- Won: Best Supporting Actress (Teresa Mo)
- Nominated: Best Director (Derek Yee)
- Nominated: Best Screenplay (Derek Yee, Chun Tin Nam)
- Nominated: Best New Performer (Fiona Sit)

42nd Golden Horse Awards

- Nominated: Best Supporting Actress (Teresa Mo)

11th Golden Bauhinia Awards

- Won: Best Supporting Actress (Teresa Mo)
- Nominated: Best New Performer (Fiona Sit)

8th Changchun Film Festival

- Won: Best Supporting Actor (Eric Tsang)
- Nominated: Best Supporting Actress (Teresa Mo)
- Nominated: Best Director (Derek Yee)
- Nominated: Best New Performer (Fiona Sit)

== See also ==
- List of Hong Kong films
