= Ups and Downs in the Sea of Love =

Hong Kong television series

- Official poster
- Also known as: One Hundred Thousand Tons of Love
- 十萬噸情緣
- Genre: Modern Drama, Romance, Comedy
- Created by: Hong Kong Television Broadcasts Limited
- Written by: Chan Chi-ho, Cheung Jung-cai, Fung Ching-man, Ma Ka-wai, Hon Yue-ting, Ha chi-him
- Directed by: Chan Wai-koon, So Man-chung, Hung Kam-put, Ng ka-kan
- Starring: Maggie Cheung Ho-yee; Nick Cheung; Joyce Tang; Ram Chiang; Angela Tong; Stephen Au
- Theme music composer: Tats Lau & Boombeat
- Opening theme: Full Speed Ahead (全速前進) by Nick Cheung
- Country of origin: Hong Kong
- Original language: Cantonese
- No. of episodes: 20

Production
- Executive producer: Virginia Lok
- Producer: Lam Chi Wah
- Production locations: Hong Kong, California, USA
- Editor: Chu Geng Kai
- Camera setup: Multi camera
- Running time: 45 minutes
- Production company: TVB

Original release
- Network: TVB Jade
- Release: 5 May – 30 May 2003

Ups and Downs in the Sea of Love
- Chinese: 十萬噸情緣
- Literal meaning: "One Hundred Thousand Tons of Love"
Transcriptions
Standard Mandarin
- Hanyu Pinyin: shí wàn dùn qíng yuán
Yue: Cantonese
- Jyutping: sap6 maan6 deon1 cing4 jyun4

Ups and Downs in the Sea of Love (Chinese: 十萬噸情緣; Jyutping: sap6 maan6 deon1 cing4 jyun4; literally "One Hundred Thousand Tons Love") is a 2003 Hong Kong romantic comedy television drama created and produced by TVB, starring Maggie Cheung Ho-yee, Nick Cheung, Joyce Tang, Ram Chiang, Angela Tong and Stephen Au as the main cast. Filming took place in summer 2002 on location in Hong Kong, California USA and a cruise ship docked at Victoria Harbour. Original broadcast began on Hong Kong's Jade July 5 till May 30, 2003 every Monday through Friday during its 9:30 to 10:30 pm timeslot with a total of 20 episodes.

== Synopsis ==
After being dumped by her fiancee, Yama (Maggie Cheung Ho-yee) meets Cruise Director Jason (Nick Cheung), who consoles her. The two fall in love and get married immediately, however when her ex-fiancee wants her back, Jason and Yama have a misunderstanding that causes them to divorce immediately. After divorcing Jason, Yama seeks the advice of a fortune teller who tells her she is going through a bad luck spell. Three years later Yama works at the Goddess Travil agency. After tending to a difficult client she receives a fax that she has won a trip on the company's cruise ship. She takes her flirtatious best-friend Pauline (Angela Tong), as her guest. Jason also works on the same cruise ship Yama has just boarded with his roommate/underling Christine (Joyce Tang). He also brings along his other roommate NG (Ram Chiang), who is a romance novelist that writes under a pen-name.

Once Yama and Jason run into each other, havoc happens. NG and Christine gets Pauline drunk to try to get her to divulge information about Yama, while Jason tries to embarrass Yama who is having dinner with the difficult client she previously tended to at the traveling agency. Furious of their actions, Yama lies that she is the Head Of Goddess Travil LA office and that she will have them all fired. Fearful of losing his job, Jason agrees to all of Yama's rigorous punishments, but she goes to far in making Jason suffer and he rebels against her punishments. Yama's difficult client hears them arguing and checks on them. Jason who thinks the client is romantically interested in Yama's exposes all of her bad habits to him, which makes Yama threaten Jason again with her lie of being the head of the travel agency's LA office. The difficult client is furious with Yama's lie and exposes his true identity as the real head of the travel agency's LA office.

Yama finds out that she didn't really win a free trip, the difficult client was never romantically interested in her and the fake trip was really an evaluation test as the real head of the travel agency's LA office saw potential in her because of the way she handled him at the traveling agency office. Seeing how Yama and Jason don't get along, the head of the main office pits them together to work on the cruise next advertising theme. The two continue to make life difficult for each other. Later Yama finds out that she is able to sue Jason for alimony support which causes him to hire Lau Wah (Stephen Au), to pretend to be interested in Yama and marry her so he can get out of paying alimony to her. Jason later finds out that Lau Wah has ulterior motives for Yama and tries to warn her, but she doesn't believe him thinking he is trying to ruin her new found love.

== Cast ==
=== Main cast ===
- Maggie Cheung Ho-yee as Yama Fong (方雅文; Fong Nga-man)
- Nick Cheung as Jason Tin (田偉晨; Tin Wai-san)
- Joyce Tang as "Ah Din" Christine Ting (丁家嘉; Ting Ka-ka)
- Ram Chiang as NG (吳小強; Ng Siu-keung)
- Angela Tong as Pauline Chan 陳寶兒; Chan Po-yee)
- Stephen Au as Lau Wah (劉華)

=== Tin family ===
- Lo Hoi-pang as Tin Lap-kwong (田立光)

=== Fong family ===
- Henry Yu as Fong Chi-chung (方志忠)
- Chan Ka-yee as Cheng Suk-chan (鄭淑珍)

=== Lau family ===
- Helena Law as Grandmother Wah (華婆; Lau po)
- Winnie Young as Zoe Lam (林依敏; Lam Yi-man)

=== Goddess Travel staff ===
- Gregory Charles Rivers as Senior Supervisor of LA office (LA高層)
- Chan Wing-chun as Senior Supervisor of LA office (LA高層)
- Samson Yeung as King Sir (伍頌景; Ng Jung-geng)
- Rebecca Chan as Cindy Ma (馬愛玲; Ma Oi Ling)
- Simon Lo as Ho Kwok-kei (何國基)
- Tong Jun-ming as Tsui Tit-san (徐鐵生)
- Iva Law as Chiu Pui-lei (趙佩麗)
- Deborah Poon as Lau Mei-mei (劉美美)
- Joe Junior as Yeung Kin (楊堅)
- Cha Cha Chan as Michelle
- Coson Leung as Billy
- Wong Jun-son as Danny
- Kiki Ho as Holly

=== Extended cast ===
- Kingdom Yuen as Aurora
- Andy Tai as Law Chung-chai (羅宗齊)
- Jerry Ku as Koo Lo (古佬)
- Dai Sui-man as Minister (部長)
- Albert Cheung as Cruise passenger (旅客)
- Candy Chu as Cruise passenger (旅客)
- Raymond Chiu as Roy
- Wang Wai-tak as Cruise entertainment (待應)
- Mak Ka-lun as Cruise entertainment (待應)
- Chan Kwok-keung as Cruise entertainment (待應)
- Tracy Wong as Wendy
- Casper Chan as Pretty girl (靚女)
- Ivy Ng as Pretty girl (靚女)
- Shally Tsang as Ms. Chiu (趙姑娘)
- Ling Hon as Elderly person (老人)
- Lai-man Ling as Elderly person (老人)
- Daniel Kwok as Chai Pong-yau (齊傍友)
- Yu Tin-wai as Security (保安)
- Kwong Chor-fai as Ship captain (船長)
- Wong Wai-leung as Sales person
- Raven Po as Sales person
- Joseph Yeung as Lawyer (律師)
- Zuki Lee as Winnie
- Ip Chun-sing as Sandwich shop owner (三文治老闆)
- Ho Chi-ceung as Male (男甲)
- Man Yeung as Assistant (權手下)
- Jason Chiu as Assistant (權手下)
- Stephen Ho as Brother Fai (輝哥)
- Tam Yut-ching as School dean (院長)
- Russell Cheung as Kelvin
- Leung Kin-ping as David
- Choi Gwok-hing as Ray (Ray父)
- Ellesmere Choi as Jacky
- Gordon Siu as Deliveryman (送貨員)
- Hugo Wong as Waiter (侍應)
- Janice Shum as Flower tea girl (茶花女)
- Pierre Ngo as Leading man (男主角)
- Samuel Yau as Sir (爵士)

== Viewership ratings ==
#	Timeslot (HKT)	Week	Episode(s)	Average points	Peaking points
1	Mon – Fri 21:30	05-10 May 2003	1 — 5	31	
2	Mon – Fri 21:30	12–17 May 2003	6 — 10	32	
3	Mon – Fri 21:30	19–24 May 2003	11 — 15	32	
4	Mon – Fri 21:30	26–30 May 2003	16 — 20	33	38
Total average				32	
