= An Inspector Calls (2015 Hong Kong film) =

2015 Hong Kong film by Raymond Wong and Herman Yau

- Film poster
- Directed by: Raymond Wong; Herman Yau
- Screenplay by: Edmond Wong
- Based on: An Inspector Calls by J. B. Priestley
- Produced by: Raymond Wong
- Starring: Louis Koo; Eric Tsang; Teresa Mo; Hans Zhang; Gordon Lam; Chrissie Chau; Karena Ng; Liu Yan; Raymond Wong
- Cinematography: Joe Chan
- Edited by: Azrael Chung
- Music by: Mak Chun Hung
- Production companies: Pegasus Motion Pictures; Guangzhou Big Honor Entertainment
- Distributed by: Pegasus Motion Pictures
- Release dates: 6 February 2015 (China); 19 February 2015 (Hong Kong)
- Running time: 86 minutes
- Country: Hong Kong
- Language: Cantonese
- Budget: US$8 million
- Box office: US$6,037,000

An Inspector Calls (Chinese: 浮華宴) is a 2015 Hong Kong black comedy film directed by Raymond Wong and Herman Yau. Based on the 1945 British play by J. B. Priestley, An Inspector Calls, the film stars Louis Koo as Inspector Goole (renamed "Inspector Karl") (Pronounced Gaa2 賈 in Cantonese, which is a homophone for 假, which means fake, or false), Eric Tsang as Arthur Birling (renamed "Kau Ming"), Teresa Mo as Sybil Birling (renamed "Anson Kau"), Hans Zhang as Gerald Croft (renamed "Johnnie Kei"), Gordon Lam as Eric Birling (renamed "Tim Kau"), Chrissie Chau as Eva Smith (though the character goes by various names), Karena Ng as Sheila Birling (renamed "Sherry Kau") and Law Lan as Edna (though unnamed in the film). In adapting the play for a Chinese audience, the film incorporates wacky, slapstick elements while retaining the original's criticism of social elites.

== Cast ==
- Louis Koo as Inspector Karl (賈探員)
- Eric Tsang as Kau Ming (裘明), a bankrupt businessman
- Teresa Mo as Anson Kau (裘李安心), chairwoman of the Women's Aid Association
- Hans Zhang as Johnnie Kei (祈世昌), a rich heir and Sherry's fiancé
- Gordon Lam as Tim Kau (裘添富), elder son of the Kau family
- Chrissie Chau as Cindy Cheung (張小娟), a suicide victim who goes by various identities throughout the film in flashbacks, such as Mavis (美芬), Snow (白雪), May Cheung (張美玲) and Jean Wong (王子欣)
- Karena Ng as Sherry Kau (裘蔓莉), younger daughter of the Kau family
- Liu Yan as Yvonne Kwok (郭婉儀), Tim's girlfriend
- Raymond Wong in multiple roles as a factory foreman; clothes shop manager; Siu Sai-kam (邵世金), Johnnie's uncle; barman; Anson's female secretary; a tattooed man.

=== Guest stars ===
- Donnie Yen as Pop quadruplet
- Kelly Chen as Inspector Jane (珍探員)
- Stephy Tang as Yvonne's assistant
- Dada Chan as Sexy
- Annie Liu as worker
- Cheung Tat-ming as Sexy's boyfriend
- Michael Tse as Super waiter (超級侍應)
- Wong You-nam as Detective Wong (黃探員), Inspector Jane's assistant
- Alex Lam as Four-Eyed Frog (四眼田雞)
- Felix Lok as brothel client
- Michelle Loo as nightclub manageress
- Law Lan as Kau's housemaid
- Jenny Xu as Jenny (珍妮)
- Jacquelin Chong as clothes shop employee
- Lisa Chong as barman's girlfriend
- Elena Kong as Mrs. Chiu (趙太)
- Tam Ping-man as brothel client
- Kingdom Yuen as Mrs. Leung (梁太)
- Amanda Lee as Snow
- Emily Kwan as Mrs. Cheung (張太)
- Anthony Sandstrom
- Zhang Songwen as brothel client
