= Lau Kong =

Hong Kong actor

- 劉江
- Born: 24 August 1946 (age 80); British Hong Kong
- Occupation: Actor
- Years active: 1976–2020
- Awards: TVB Anniversary Awards – Professional Actor Award; 2013

Lau Kong (Chinese: 劉江) is a Hong Kong actor known for his roles in TVB dramas. He left the network in 2020, after starring in over 300 dramas in his 38 years with TVB.

== Biography ==
Lau began his acting career with the now defunct network Commercial Television. He later worked at RTV (now ATV) between 1979-1982. From 1982 onwards, Lau served as veteran actor there, portraying various types of roles, mostly as a patriarch. And many TVB actors and actresses have been his "son" or "daughter“, and there are very few actors in TVB that have never worked with him.

== Filmography ==
=== Films ===
- The Young Dragons (1974)
- Last Hurrah for Chivalry (1979)
- Demi-Gods and Semi-Devils (1982)
- Queen of Kowloon (2000)
- Beast Stalker (2008)
- The Stool Pigeon (2010)
- The Prosecutor (2024)

=== Commercial Television ===
Year	Title
1976	The Legend of the Condor Heroes
1976	The Return of the Condor Heroes
1977	Sword Stained with Royal Blood
1978	Wu Lin Wai Shi
1980	Feng Lei Di Yi Dao

=== Rediffusion ===
Year	Title
1979	The Roving Swordsman
1980	Reincarnated
1980	Dai Tei Yan Cheng
1980	The Legendary Fok

=== TVB ===
Year	Title	Role	Notes/Ref.
1982	San Lui You Sum		
1982	Gu Cheng Ke		
1982	Soh Kei Yee		
1982	Love and Passion		
1982	The Emissary		
1983	Legend of the Condor Heroes	Yuen-ngan Hung-lit	
1983	Kwai Kum Ho Wan		
1983	Detective Pik Lek		
1983	Moh Min Tin See		
1983	The Foundation	Li Jing (Tang dynasty)	
1983	The Smiling, Proud Wanderer	Fung Ching-yeung	
1983	The Deer and The Cauldron	Shun-chi Emperor	
1984	Qiu Jin		
1984	The Return of Wong Fei Hung	Wong Fei-hung	
1985	Flying Fox of Snowy Mountain	Lee Tsi-sing	
1985	Moh Lam Sai Ka		
1985	The Ride		
1985	The Battlefield	Siu Ho	
1985	Yang Jia Jiang		
1985	Luk Siew Fung Chih Fung Moh Jau Tin		
1986	San Yong CID		
1986	The Return of Luk Siu Fung	Lau-wan Koi-see	
1986	The Rogue Millionaire		
1986	Lam Chung	Ko Kau	
1986	The Legend of Wong Tai Sin		
1986	New Heavenly Sword and Dragon Sabre	Sing Kwan	
1987	Keng Toi Lai Ming		
1987	Lip Sa Hang Tong		
1987	The Legend of the Book and the Sword	Luk Fei-ching	
1988	Nam Kuen Choi Lei Fat		
1988	The Formidable Lady from Shaolin	Heshen	
1988	A Tak Ya Fong Kwong		
1988	Twilight of a Nation	Tsang Kwok-fan	
1988	Battle at Royal City		
1989	The Final Combat	Duen Hoi	
1989	Tin Bin		
1990	Soek San Kei hap		
1990	The Failed Husband		
1990	Fei Yuet Koon Cheung		
1991	Yan Hoi Kiu Yeung		
1991	Soek San Kei Hap Chih Sin Luei Kei Yuen		
1991	Lam Sek Fung Poh		
1991	Piu bak Eng Hung		
1992	Dragon's Sky		
1992	92 Chung Mo Yin		
1992	Fan Tao Wai Lung		
1992	The Greed of Man	Chow Chai-sang	
1992	Revelation of the Last Hero	Sze-ma Chung-wang	
1992	Legend of the Condor Heroes the Nine Yin Prophecy		
1992	Kam Sheh Leung Kuan		
1993	All About tin		
1993	Sun Chong On Chuen Zhan		
1993	The Mystery of the Condor Hero	Hung Tsat-kung	
1994	Sang Seh Song		
1994	The Legend of the Condor Heroes	Genghis Khan	
1994	Dit Dam Leung Kuen		
1994	Instinct	Ma Sing	
1995	Detective Investigation Files		
1995	Plain Love		
1995	ICAC Heroes		
1995	The Condor Heroes 95	Mou Sam-tung	
1995	Qin Yan Cheng Mei Lieu		
1995	Corruption Doesn't Pay	Po Siu Chung	
1996	Cold Blood Warm Heart		
1996	State of Divinity	Heung Man-tin	
1996	Ambition	Yu Ha	
1996	Journey to the West	King of Chechi	
1997	Lok Tan Cha Pun Sang		
1997	Miu Chui Fa		
1997	The Old Time Buddy		
1997	Demi-Gods and Semi-Devils	Yuen Chi	
1997	Detective Investigative Files III		
1997	Justice Sung		
1997	A Recipe for the Heart		
1998	Untraceable Evidence		
1998	Lei To Tak Keng		
1998	Before Dawn		
1998	Yuen ka Yi Kit Pat Yi Kai		
1998	The Duke of Mount Deer	Prince Hong	
1998	Journey to the West II	Old Dragon King	
1999	Flying Fox of Snowy Mountain	Yim Kei	
1999	Untraceable Evidence II		
1999	Man's Best Friend		
1999	Detective Investigation Files IV		
1999	At the Threshold of an Era	Hui Tai-hon	
1999	Witness to a Prosecution	Ma Kwai	
2000	Street Fighters		
2000	Sun Sin Yan		
2000	Crimson Sabre	Wan Fong-san	
2000	A Taste of love		
2001	Country Spirit		
2002	Love is Beautiful (TV series)	Imperial Uncle	
2002	A Case of Misadventure		
2002	Eternal Happiness		
2002	Golden Faith		
2003	To Catch a Thief		
2003	The 'W' Files	Chun Cheng-hei	
2003	Perish in the Name of Love	周奎	
2003	Find the Light		
2003	Point of No Return	Lam Dong	
2003	The Legend of Love		
2003	Lady Fan	Chan Fu	
2004	Armed Reaction IV	Chiang Kun	
2004	Dream of Colours		
2004	Twin of Brothers	Li Yuan	
2004	Split Second	Cheng Kwan/Lee Man Ho	
2004	The Last Breakthrough	Wong Po-kin	
2004	The Conqueror's Story	Lui Man	
2005	The Academy		
2005	Life Made Simple		
2005	Real Kung Fu		
2005	The Herbalist's Manual		
2006	The Biter Bitten		
2006	Safe Guards	Sheung Ching-Pang	Best Supporting Actor Nomination (Top 20)
2006	Forensic Heroes		
2006	To Grow With Love		
2007	Face to Fate		
2007	A Change of Destiny		
2007	The Drive Of Life	Wang Ching-kwok	
2007-2008	Best Selling Secrets	Man Chi-Cheung	
2008	The Master of Tai Chi		
2008	Love Exchange		
2008	The Four	Choi King	
2008	When Easterly Showers Fall On The Sunny West		
2009	Off Pedder	Luk Wan-ting	
2009	The Greatness of a Hero	Sung Cheung-kwai	
2009	E.U.	Kong Ping	
2009	Man in Charge	Shum Cheung-lun	
2009	The Threshold of a Persona	Chung Kwok-sing	
2009	In the Chamber of Bliss	Yu Suen-lung	
2009	ICAC Investigators 2009	Lam Man-sam	
2009	Born Rich	Cheuk Wo-fung	
2010	O.L. Supreme	Lui Siu-lung (Martin)	
2010	Sisters of Pearl	Chu Siu-cheung	
2010	Ghost Writer	Ma Yuk-sing	
2010	Some Day	Sek Yau-wai	
2010	Every Move You Make	Ching Siu-on	
2010	No Regrets	Wu Tai-yuen	
2011	Only You	Ching Kwok-fu	Episode 22 - 30
2011	Relic of an Emissary	To Hin	
2011	The Other Truth	So Wai-kuen	Episode 8-10
2011	The Life and Times of a Sentinel	Tin Kong-ching	
2011	River of Wine	Magistrate Tsang Kin-leung	
2012	Wish and Switch	Koo Wing-si	
2012	Daddy Good Deeds		
2012	Gloves Come Off	Yam Kwok-lung	
2012	Three Kingdoms RPG		
2012	Come Home Love		
2012	The Last Steep Ascent		
2012	Silver Spoon, Sterling Shackles		
2012	The Confidant	Lei Yuk	
2012	Missing You		
2013	A Great Way to Care II	Mok Kwai San	
2013	Brother's Keeper	Lo Fu-shing	
2014	Storm in a Cocoon	Chou Tin Chi	
2014	Ghost Dragon of Cold Mountain	Fung Nam Tin	
2014	Black Heart White Soul	Ko Lam	
2014	Shades of Life	Fung Bak	Episode 4
2014	Rear Mirror	Yiu Siu Wing	
2014	Line Walker	Kwok Hok-wah	
2015	Eye in the Sky	Kong Wui-hoi	
2015	Limelight Years	Suen Long	
2015	Momentary Lapse Of Reason	Chong Ngou-shan	
2015	Captain of Destiny	Jiaqing Emperor	
2015-2016	Love as a Predatory Affair	Lau Kam	
2016	K9 Cop	Chung Ying-may	
2016	House of Spirits	Po Luk	
2017	No Reserve	林群	
2017	The Exorcist's Meter	Kwok Wing-sing 郭永城	
2018	The Forgotten Valley	Luk Kam-kuk 陸金谷	Nominated - TVB Anniversary Award for Best Actor
2018	Apple-colada	Wong Fai-tong 黃輝棠	
2019	Barrack O’Karma	Lam Yeuk-sze 林若思	
2020	The Exorcist’s 2nd Meter	Kwok Wing-sing 郭永城	
2020	The Witness		
2022	Barrack O’Karma 1968	Lam Yeuk-sze 林若思	Guest appearance in episode 20
