= The Building Blocks of Life =

Chinese television series

- 建築有情天
- Genre: Modern Drama
- Starring: Alex Fong; Christine Ng; Tavia Yeung
- Opening theme: "深情" by David Lui
- Country of origin: Hong Kong
- Original language: Cantonese
- No. of episodes: 20

Production
- Running time: 45 minutes (approx.)

Original release
- Network: TVB
- Release: December 3 – December 28, 2007

The Building Blocks of Life (Traditional Chinese: 建築有情天) is a TVB modern drama series broadcast in December 2007. The plot revolves around an architecture theme.

== Synopsis ==
Isaac (Alex Fong), a rising architect in a construction company, is about to engage with his lover Winnie (Christine Ng). Right before they marry, Isaac unknowingly falls in love with a fellow architect employee named Freeda (Tavia Yeung), spending time with her despite remaining loyal to Winnie. Consequently, Winnie becomes angry at Freeda for interrupting their marriage and relationship. She becomes paranoid, suspecting Isaac of all types of cheating and wrongdoings. Soon Isaac's architectural job would be disturbed by all the unnecessary trauma and chaos caused by his anxiety-stricken future wife. Another rising architect named Brian (Power Chan) would try to move up in the company. Isaac, however, remains one of the top men and the company favorite.

As a new tactic, Brian resorts to bribing SY (Chung King Fai), the CEO of the construction company. SY's daughter On-Kiu (Natalie Tong) is a beautiful but extremely naive girl. Her father had initially set high expectations for her to graduate in dozen possible major universities in the United Kingdom, though On-Kiu was never good enough as a student. She faked her college diploma and kept it a secret. Brian would later discover this secret and blackmail SY to gain prominence, threatening to publicize the damaging diploma info and ruin SY's business and credibility. SY is one of the most well-respected members in the construction business, his company having a long-established solid reputation.

Meanwhile, Winnie continues to mistrust Isaac and is convinced he is really in some relationship with Freeda. One day, Isaac and Freeda get drunk together while away on a Mainland-China construction assignment. Isaac, intoxicated, ends up having an affair with Freeda. Winnie is finally able to prove Isaac's disloyalty to be not imaginary. She becomes even more heated and harasses Freeda daily. Eventually, Winnie would unintentionally hit Freeda while driving and flee the scene after hesitation, causing Freeda to sustain a short coma and be hospitalised. After waking up, she decides to leave Hong Kong due to the love-triangle fiasco. Isaac decides to discontinue his marriage plans with Winnie.

The story continues with Brian now in full control of the company with his bribes and blackmails. He makes it all very public, and forces SY to fire Isaac, the top architect. Brian now oversees all corporate decisions, including payroll, bonuses, and all human resource issues. He also tricks On-Kiu, the CEO's daughter, into marriage. SY becomes highly displeased, but there is little he can do, as On-Kiu is actually content to be in a relationship with Brian. On-Kiu would later bear a child for Brian.

By this time the company is already in an alarming financial crisis, with Brian forcing too many poor unwitting decisions which undermines the company's integrity. In a major new construction deal, Brian is supposed to win a 10-year contract and be financially saved, supposedly with no competition and hassle. Isaac, who was previously fired, now returns with his own start-up company to compete for this 10-year contract. As retribution, Brian physically strikes Isaac's hand with a wooden bat so he can no longer draw. Freeda, the former architect who had an affair with Isaac before, coincidentally returns to Hong Kong. She would help him complete the construction plans and drawings.

While Isaac has a solid design proposal, his chance remains slim. He has to compete with SY, who has had an excellent reputation in the industry. Though he is still reduced as Brian's blackmail-puppet. One day, On-Kiu discovers that her father has been protecting the company and family reputation by putting-up with endless manipulation and financial abuses due to her fake diploma. She gives in, and SY finally becomes free to rid the manipulation. In a surprising move, SY assists the opposing company owned by Isaac instead of backing Brian up, causing his own company to lose the 10-year contract. Brian becomes furious of his puppet-CEO's sell-out. Before Brian publicized the fake diploma info to the media, SY has already figured out ways to tie all the blackmailing to Brian as the main person responsible. Brian eventually loses control of everything, including his health; having developed intestinal cancer with a 50-50 chance survival rate. He later on agreed to take surgery with the support of On-Kiu by his side and they eventually get a newborn in the end.

Under the new start-up company and contract, Isaac would help build a new shoreline on the beaches. Freeda, the former architect who assisted him with the winning design, suddenly discontinue their renewed friendship. It turns out the hit-and-run car accident from earlier had created a brain tumor. She is constantly suffering from memory loss, and things are getting worse. Winnie eventually becomes involved with a new man and moves from her flat. Isaac will see her from a distance in the last episode. As for Freeda, she captures her life on a CD and her camera for Isaac to keep. She leaves Hong Kong for a year (to Paris) and asks Isaac to meet up with her in a year time. In the span of the year, Freeda's condition gets worse and starts to lose her memory. Isaac and Freeda meets on a beach, but she pretends to not remember Isaac. Isaac walks away thinking all is lost, but Freeda shouts out his name. The last episode ends as the two stand at a distance as the sun sets upon them.

== Cast ==
Cast	Role	Description
Alex Fong	Chung Kwok-Keung (Isaac) 鍾國強	Architect; Ching Wai-Yee's ex-boyfriend. Cheung Man-Jing's mentor/lover.
Christine Ng	Ching Wai-Yee (Winnie) 程慧儀	Real Estate Agent; Chung Kwok-Keung's ex-girlfriend.
Tavia Yeung	Cheung Man-Jing (Freeda) 張文政	Architect; Cheung Lei's younger half sister. Chung Kwok-Keung's lover.
Chung King Fai	Kong Sing-Yue (Preston SY) 江承宇	Architect Firm Boss; Kong On-Kiu's father.
Power Chan	Yeung Chi-Hin (Brian) 楊子軒	Architect; Kong On-Kiu's lover. Chung Kwok-Keung's rival.
Natalie Tong	Kong On-Kiu (Veronica) 江安蕎	Kong Sung-Yue's daughter.
Anne Heung	Cheung Lei (Lily) 張莉	Cheung Man-Jing's older half sister.
Lai Lok-yi	Choi Ji-Kin 蔡志賢	Chung Kwok-Keung's co-worker and son of client
Timmy Hung (洪天明)	Chow Lap-Chun 周立春	Cheung Man-Jing's friend/co-worker.
Kingdom Yuen (苑瓊丹)	Chung Kwok-Mei 鍾國美	Chung Kwok-Keung's older sister. Sing Dai-Yip's mother.
Sam Chan	Sing Dai-Yip (Don) 成大業	Chung Kwok-Mei's son. Chung Kwok-Keung's nephew. Kong On-Kiu's ex-boyfriend.
Makbau Mak (麥長青)		Ching Wai-Yee's new boyfriend

== Viewership ratings ==
	Week	Episode	Average Points	Peaking Points	References
1	December 3–7, 2007	1 — 5	28	30	
2	December 10–14, 2007	6 — 10	28	31	
3	December 17–21, 2007	11 — 15	27	32	
4	December 24–28, 2007	16 — 20	27	34	

== Awards and nominations ==
41st TVB Anniversary Awards (2008)

- "Best Drama" - Nominated
