= Magnificent Team =

1998 Hong Kong film by David Lam

- Film poster
- Traditional Chinese: 非常警察
- Simplified Chinese: 非常警察
- Hanyu Pinyin: Fēi Cháng Jǐng Chá
- Jyutping: Fei1 Seong4 Ging2 Caat3
- Directed by: David Lam
- Written by: Wong Ho-wah
- Produced by: Raymond Wong; Wong Sing-lim
- Starring: Francis Ng; Christine Ng; Amanda Lee; Simon Lui; Benz Hui; Karen Tong; Herman Chan
- Cinematography: Tony Cheung; Sunny Tsang
- Edited by: Poon Hung
- Music by: Wong Wai-nin
- Production companies: Mandarin Films; Sil-Metropole Organisation
- Distributed by: Mandarin Films
- Release date: 8 September 1998
- Running time: 92 minutes
- Country: Hong Kong
- Language: Cantonese
- Box office: HK$1,433,165

Magnificent Team is a 1998 Hong Kong action crime comedy film directed by David Lam and starring Francis Ng, Christine Ng, Amanda Lee, Simon Lui, Benz Hui, Karen Tong and the-then newcomer Herman Chan in his only film role.

== Cast ==
- Francis Ng as Chick
- Christine Ng as Kitty
- Amanda Lee as Madam Zita Fong
- Simon Lui as Chiu
- Benz Hui as Sergeant Hui
- Karen Tong as Mimi
- Herman Chan as Wing
- Angela Tong as Yuki
- Michael Lam as Two Stroke
- Yee Tin-hung as TNT
- Lo Mang as Boss King
- William Duen as John
- Woo Wai-chung as Hung / Dam U
- Chin Hoi Lun as Sandy
- Orlando To as Sandy's brother
- Conroy Chan as David Lin
- Chan Chi-hung as Officer Chan
- Chu Cho-kuen as Salty
- Stephen Ho as Inspector
- Michael Lam Kong as John's subordinate
- Emily Kwan as Zita's former CIB colleague
- Nelson Cheung as Zita's former CIB colleague
- Ling Chi-hung as Armour guard / CID
- Chan Siu-wah as CID
- Law Wai-kai as Care-taker
- Tang Wing-san as Zita's father
- Pang Mei-seung as Chick's mother
