= Best Selling Secrets =

2007 Hong Kong TV series

- Poster
- 同事三分親
- Genre: Sitcom
- Starring: Esther Kwan; Elaine Jin; Alvina Kong; Vin Choi; Geoffery Wong; Yoyo Chen; Stephen Au; Bill Chan; Wayne Lai; Wong Cho-lam
- Country of origin: Hong Kong
- Original language: Cantonese
- No. of episodes: 364

Production
- Producer: TVB
- Production location: Hong Kong
- Running time: 20 minutes

Original release
- Network: TVB Jade
- Release: March 12, 2007 – August 7, 2008

Related
- Off Pedder

Best Selling Secrets (Traditional Chinese: 同事三分親) is a TVB modern sitcom series broadcast from March 2007 to August 2008.

The sitcom is about office politics in an advertisement company, as well as family and romantic relationships amongst the characters.

== Synopsis ==
Wong Ka-Nam (Esther Kwan) disappeared to the United States, leaving behind her son and husband in Hong Kong. When her husband dies in an airplane accident looking for her, Wong Ka-Nam's son, Luk Chit (Vin Choi) is taken into the custody of her mother-in-law, Ng Hang (Elaine Jin). After eighteen long years, Wong Ka-Nam wishes to see her son again and returns to Hong Kong. However, she is met with adamant resistance from her mother-in-law, who views Ka-Nam as bad luck, blaming her for the death of her son. Highly protective of her grandson and fearing that Wong Ka-Nam will attempt to take him away, Ka Nam's mother-in-law does everything in her power to keep mother and son apart.

However Wong Ka-Nam is ironically assisted by her own son, who befriends her and secures her office job in his advertising agency. Most of story involves comedic and complex dynamics of office and family politics between rivals, friendship and romance within the office and household, while in the midst of Wong Ka-Nam watching over her son.

== Cast ==
=== Main cast ===
Cast	Role	Description
Esther Kwan	Wong Ka-Nam (Wong Fa) 黃家嵐 (黃花)	Xing (形) Advertising Agency Consultant; Luk Chit's mother. Yin Wai-Sun's girlfriend. Ng Han's daughter-in-law.
Vin Choi (蔡淇俊)	Luk Chit 陸哲	Xing (形) Advertising Agency Photographer; Wong Ka-Nam's son. Ho Tung-Tung's boyfriend.
Elaine Jin	Ng Hang 伍恆	Tai Chi Master; Luk Chit's grandmother. Wong Ka-Nam's mother-in-law. Tin Joi-Shan's girlfriend.
Bill Chan	Tin Joi-Shan 田在山	Chef; Ng Hang's boyfriend. Yuen Man-Cheung's restaurant partner.
Elvina Kong	Dai On-Na/Man On-Na (Diana) 戴安娜/文安娜	Xing (形) Advertising Agency CEO; Kau Chun's lover. Man Chi-Cheung's daughter. Yin Wai-Sun's ex-girlfriend. Man Sing-Kwan's stepsister/rival.
Geoffrey Wong (黃子雄)	Yin Wai-Sun (Vincent) 言為信	Xing (形) Advertising Agency CEO; Wong Ka-Nam's boyfriend. Dai On-Na's ex-boyfriend.
Stephen Au	David Mo Gei-Yung 武紀勇	Xing (形) Advertising Agency Creative Supervisor; Man Sing-Kwan's lover. Wai Yat's friend.
Tsui Wing (徐榮)	Tony Kau Tsun 裘俊	Xing (形) Advertising Agency Senior Assistant; Dai On-Na's lover.
Brian Burrell (布韋傑)	Wai Yat 韋一	Xing (形) Advertising Agency Director; Mo Gei-Yung's friend. Ming Leung's husband.
Wong Cho Lam	Lau Wah 樓華	Xing (形) Advertising Agency Computer Technician; Luk Chit's best friend. Ho Tung-Tung's cousin. Ng Hang's housemaid.
Yoyo Chen (陳自瑤)	Kawaii Ho Tung-Tung 何彤彤	Ex-Model/Xing (形) Advertising Agency Photographer; Luk Chit's girlfriend. Lau Wah's cousin.
Rachel Kan (簡慕華)	Doris	Xing (形) Advertising Agency Secretary; Yuen Man-Cheung's lover.
Florence Kwok	Queenie Man Sing-Kwan 文丞君	Cho Yu Chim (祖與佔) Advertising Agency Director; Mo Gei-Yung's lover. Dai On-Na's step sister/rival.
Angela Tong	Ming Leung 明亮	Ex-Police Officer/Yin (言) Corporation Public Relations Consultant; Wai Yat's wife.
Wong Hei	Ng Gung-Gan (Kilo) 伍公斤	Xing (形) Advertising Agency Business Consultant; Ng Hang's younger brother. Luk Chit's great uncle.
Aimee Chan	Dai En-Loi 戴銀來	Yin (言) Corporation Secretary; Luk Chit's friend. Ho Tung-Tung's love rival. Dai Kam's daughter.
Lau Ying Wai (楊英偉)	Wong Kwok-Lap 黃國立	Yin (言) Corporation Senior Consultant; Wong Ka-Nam's older brother. Luk Chit's uncle.
Lau Kong (劉江)	Man Chi-Cheung 文子祥	Man (文) Corporation President; Yin Ying-Ming's best friend. Dai On-Na and Man Sing-Kwan's father.
Chan Hung Lit (陳鴻烈)	Yin Ying-Ming 言英明	Yin ( 言) Corporation President; Man Chi-Cheung's best friend. Yin Wai-Sun and Yin Wai-Bun's father. Ng Hang's friend
Mikako Leung (梁珈詠)	Lily Lau Ding-Ying 劉定英	Xing (形) Advertising Agency Receptionist; Lau Ka-Wo's older sister. Mo Gei-Yung's god-sister.
Raymond Chiu (趙永洪)	Marco Lau Ka-Wo 劉嘉和	Xing (形) Advertising Agency Accountant; Lau Ding-Ying's younger brother. Li Man-Kei's friend.
Jim Tang	Gary Li Man-Kei 李文祺	Xing (形) Advertising Agency Accountant; Lau Ka-Wo's friend.
Janice Shum (沈可欣)	Michelle Tam Yuk-Ying 譚育英	Xing (形) Advertising Agency HR Personnel
Helena Wong (黃卓慧)	Ann Tse Yan-Yan 謝欣欣	Xing (形) Advertising Agency HR Personnel
Summer Joe (夏竹欣)	Candy Chung Oi-Ting 鍾靄婷	Xing (形) Advertising Agency HR Personnel
Cheng Chi Shing (鄭子誠)	Yin Wai-Bun 言為本	Doctor; Yin Wai-Sun's older brother. Yin Ying-Ming's son.
Kingdom Yuen (苑瓊丹)	Hung Sam 洪參	Xing (形) Advertising Agency Cleaning/Sanitation Lady
Angelina Lo (盧宛茵)	Sheung Koon-Fung 上官鳳	Tai Chi Master; Ho Tung-Tung's mother. Ng Hang's rival.
Wayne Lai	Boris Yuen Man-Cheung 阮文昌	Chef; Doris's lover. Yuen Mei-Yiu's older brother. Tin Joi-Shan's business partner.
Jeanette Leung (梁政玨)	Yuen Mei-Yiu (Mei Mei) 阮美瑤	Student/Xing (形) Advertising Agency Temporary Data Entry Clerk; Yuen Man-Cheung's younger sister. Luk Chit's ex-girlfriend.
Rabee'a Yeung (楊洛婷)	Ming Chu 明珠	Kau Tsun's cousin. Lau Wah's lover.

=== Guest starring ===
Cast	Role	Description
Bernice Liu		Herself (Episode 18)
Catherine Chau (周家怡)		Yin Wai-Sun's ex-girlfriend. (Episode 8)
Stephen Huynh	Tommy	Badminton Coach (Episode 23)
Fala Chen	To Bing-Bing 杜冰冰	Model; Li Gung-Chi ex-girlfriend. (Episode 28)
Nick Cheung		Customer (Episode 137)
Patrick Dunn	Kiu Wai 喬偉	Architect (Episode 183)
Koni Lui	Daisy	Li Gung-Chi's ex-girlfriend. (Episode 192)
Sunny Chan	Chan Chi-Kin 陳志賢	Psychologist (Episode 240, 241, 246, 250)
Louisa So	Lai Pong Yue-Yuk 黎龐如玉	Tycoon (Episode 242-247)
Joyce Koi (蓋鳴暉)		Herself/Opera Singer (Episode 279)
Queenie Chu	Ella Chan	Tuxedo Company CEO; Yin Wai-Sun's old classmate. (Episode 301)
Corinna Chamberlain (陳明恩)		Mandarin and Cantonese speaking caucasian lady

=== Other cast ===
Cast	Role	Description
Rocky Cheng (鄭健樂)	James Jim	Gym Trainer; Chai Siu-Ping's husband.
Fanny Ip (葉凱茵)	Chai Siu-Ping 柴小屏	James Jim's wife. Wong Ka-Nam's friend.
Gill Mohindepaul Singh (喬寶寶)	Kiu Kwok-Bo 喬國寶	Senior Police Officer; Ming Leung's ex-boss.
Lawrence Yan (甄志強)	Li Gung-Chi (Philip) 李公子	Yin Wai-Sun's friend.
Carrie Lam	Catherine	Yin Wai-Sun's ex-girlfriend.
Manna Chan	Dai Fei 戴菲	Dai On-Na's mother. Man Chi-Cheung's ex-lover.
Lee Yee Man	LuLu	Bar Waitress; Lau Ka-Wo's girlfriend.
Sharon Luk	Carrie	Jewellery Salesperson; Li Gung-Chi's ex-girlfriend.
Law Lok Lam (羅樂林)	Dai Kam 戴金	Dai En-Loi's father. Yin Ying-Ming's business rival.

== Product placements ==
- Best Selling Secrets was one of the first TVB series that featured placement of products, namely Sony Ericsson mobile phones, which were written into the plot for a few episodes.
- IBM T2x ThinkPad laptop computers were also featured as mobile workstations of choice for the characters.

== Award nominations ==
40th TVB Anniversary Awards (2007)

- "Best Drama"
- "Best Actor in a Supporting Role" (Tsui Wing - Tony Kau Chun)
- "Best Actor in a Supporting Role" (Wong Cho Lam - Lau Wah)
- "Best Actor in a Supporting Role" (Stephen Au - David Mo Gei-Yung)
- "Best Actress in a Supporting Role" (Yoyo Chen - Kawaii Ho Tung-Tung)
- "My Favourite Male Character Role" (Stephen Au - David Mo Gei-Yung)
- "My Favourite Male Character Role" (Geoffrey wong - Yin Wai Sun)
- "My Favourite Female Character Role" (Esther Kwan - Wong Ka-Nam)
- "My Favourite Female Character Role" (Elaine Jin - Ng Han)
- "My Favourite Female Character Role" (Elvina Kong - Diana Dai On-Na)

41st TVB Anniversary Awards (2008)

- "Best Drama"
- "Best Actor in a Supporting Role" (Tsui Wing - Tony Kau Chun)
- "Best Actor in a Supporting Role" (Stephen Au - David Mo Gei-Yung)

== See also ==
- Off Pedder
