= Teresa Mo =

Hong Kong actress

- 毛舜筠
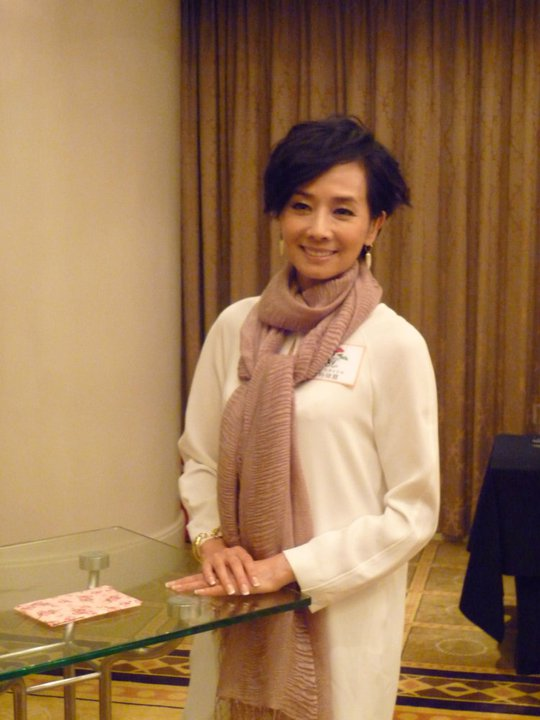
- Mo in 2011
- Born: Mo Shun-kwan; 5 November 1960 (age 65); British Hong Kong
- Occupation: Actress
- Years active: 1977–present
- Spouses: Man Shu Yeun (m. 1980; div. 1983) Jeffrey Chiang (m. 1988; div. 1994) Tony Au (m. 1995)
- Children: Au Yik-san (daughter); Au Ling-san (daughter)
- Awards: Hong Kong Film Awards – Best Actress; 2018 Tomorrow Is Another Day; Best Supporting Actress; 2006 2 Young Golden Bauhinia Awards – Best Supporting Actress; 2006 2 Young

Chinese name
- Chinese: 毛舜筠
Transcriptions
Standard Mandarin
- Hanyu Pinyin: Máo Shùnjūn
Yue: Cantonese
- Jyutping: Mou4 Seon3gwan1

Teresa Mo Shun-kwan (born 5 November 1960) is a Hong Kong actress. She won the Hong Kong Film Award for Best Actress for Tomorrow Is Another Day (2017), previously winning Best Supporting Actress for 2 Young (2005).

== Background ==
She started her career at RTV in 1977, and joined TVB in 1981. She became famous for being cast in The Justice of Life (他來自江湖), which was based on Stephen Chow's works. In 1990s, she made frequent appearances in feature films.

== Personal life ==
She is married to director Tony Au and they have two daughters, Au Yik-san (區亦山) and Au Ling-san (區令山).

== Filmography ==
Year	Title	Role	Notes
1977	What Price Stardom		
1984	The Duke of Mount Deer	Mook Kim-ping	TV series
1985	The Last Performance		TV series
1985	Sword Stained with Royal Blood	Ah Gao	TV series
1986	The Yang's Saga	Yang Sam Leung	TV series
1986	A Taste of Bachelorhood		TV series
1986	Dharma		TV series
1988	Twilight of a Nation	Yip Ling	TV series
1989	Seven Warriors		
1989	The Justice of Life	Yuen Doi-Yuk	TV series
1990	Ngai cheng sam gok chor		TV series
1990	Legend of the Dragon	Mo	
1990	Front Page	Miss Ho	
1990	Yao see yuen gar yao jui tao		TV series
1991	Don't Fool Me	Miss Mui	
1991	Point of No Return	Angel	
1991	Magnificent Scoundrels	Kwan	
1991	Daddy, Father and Papa		
1991	His Fatal Ways	Ming's Sister	
1991	The Lady of Iron	Chan Bo-chu (陳寶珠)	TVB series
1992	My Americanized Wife		
1992	Red Shield	Suk-Han	
1992	All's Well, Ends Well	Leung Mo-Shang	
1992	Once Upon a Time a Hero in China	Aunt Yee Siu-Dim	
1992	92 Legendary La Rose Noire	Chow Wai-Kuen	
1992	Love: Now You See It... Now You Don't	Dotty	
1992	Hard Boiled	Constable Teresa Chang	
1993	Laughter of the Water Margins		
1993	Lady Super Cop	Lo	
1993	All's Well, Ends Well Too	Jinx	
1993	Lamb Killer		
1993	Once Upon a Time a Hero in China II	Aunt Yee	
1993	Perfect Couples		
1994	I Have a Date with Spring	Woman at Concert Hall	
1994	Don't Shoot Me, I'm Just a Violinist	Inspector Mo	
1994	It's a Wonderful Life	Kow-An Yum	
2000	And I Hate You So	Cat	
2003	Men Suddenly in Black	Jin's Wife	
2003	The Spy Dad	Barbara	
2003	Finding Nemo	Dory	Animation Voiceover
2004	Protégé de la Rose Noire	Black Rose	
2005	2 Young	Fu's mom	
2006	Men Suddenly in Black 2		
2006	Mr. 3 Minutes	Joe	
2007	Mr. Cinema	Chan Sau-ying	
2007	It's a Wonderful Life	Mo Ching-ching	
2007	Dancing Lion		
2008-2010	Off Pedder	Ivy Yan Seung	TV series
2010	Some Day	Jing Kiu	TV series
2010	Perfect Wedding	Doris	
2012	I Love Hong Kong 2012	Mimi Kwok Mei-mei	
2012	Love Is... Pyjamas		
2013	Hotel Deluxe	Cruella Koo	
2014	Hello Babies		
2015	An Inspector Calls	Anson Kau	
2016	Come Home Love: Dinner at 8	Lam Siu Siu	TV series
2016	Finding Dory	Dory	Animation Voiceover
2017	Tomorrow Is Another Day		
2019	I Love You, You're Perfect, Now Change!		
2020	Enter the Fat Dragon	Charisma / Christina	
2022	Mama's Affair	Yu Mei Fung	
2022	Hong Kong Family	Ling	
2023	Over My Dead Body	Meghan So	

== Awards and nominations ==
Year	Award	Category	Nominated work	Result
1994	12th Hong Kong Film Awards	Best Supporting Actress	Love: Now You See It... Now You Don't	Nominated
1994	12th Hong Kong Film Awards	Best Supporting Actress	92 Legendary La Rose Noire	Nominated
2001	20th Hong Kong Film Awards	Best Supporting Actress	And I Hate You So	Nominated
2006	25th Hong Kong Film Awards	Best Supporting Actress	2 Young	Won
2006	11th Golden Bauhinia Awards	Best Supporting Actress	2 Young	Won
2007	26th Hong Kong Film Awards	Best Actress	Men Suddenly in Black 2	Nominated
2008	27th Hong Kong Film Awards	Best Actress	Mr. Cinema	Nominated
2009	41st TVB Anniversary Awards	Best Actress	Off Pedder	Nominated
2009	41st TVB Anniversary Awards	My Favourite Female Character	Off Pedder	Nominated
2010	42nd TVB Anniversary Awards	Best Actress	Some Day	Nominated
2010	42nd TVB Anniversary Awards	My Favourite Female Character	Some Day	Nominated
2018	37th Hong Kong Film Awards	Best Actress	Tomorrow Is Another Day	Won
2023	41st Hong Kong Film Awards	Best Actress	Mama's Affair	Nominated
