= A Home with a View =

2019 Hong Kong film by Herman Yau

- Film poster

Chinese name
- Traditional Chinese: 家和萬事驚
- Simplified Chinese: 家和万事惊
Transcriptions
Standard Mandarin
- Hanyu Pinyin: Jiā Hé Wàn Shì Jīng
Yue: Cantonese
- Jyutping: Gaa1 Wo4 Maan6 Si6 Ging1
- Directed by: Herman Yau
- Screenplay by: Cheung Tat-ming
- Based on: Family Surprise by Cheung Tat-ming
- Produced by: Cheung Tat-ming; Stanley Tong
- Starring: Francis Ng; Louis Koo; Anita Yuen; Cheung Tat-ming; Lam Suet
- Cinematography: Joe Chan; Mandy Ngai
- Edited by: Azrael Chung
- Music by: Mak Chun Hung
- Production companies: Er Dong Pictures; Sun Entertainment Culture; Fei Fan Entertainment Production; Sil-Metropole Organisation; Er Dong Pictures (Hong Kong) Company
- Distributed by: Bravos Pictures
- Release date: 24 January 2019
- Running time: 92 minutes
- Country: Hong Kong
- Language: Cantonese

A Home with a View is a 2019 Hong Kong black comedy film directed by Herman Yau and starring Francis Ng, Louis Koo, Anita Yuen and Cheung Tat-ming, who also co-produced and wrote the screenplay. The film is an adaptation the play, Family Surprise, which was also written by Cheung.

== Plot ==
In order to preserve the value of his assets, Lo Wai-man (Francis Ng) spent all of his savings and his father's retirement pensions to purchase an old-age flat in the middle of a noisy neighborhood, cohabiting with his neurotic wife, Suk-yin (Anita Yuen) unemployed son, Bun-hong (Ng Siu-hin), daughter, Yu-sze (Jocelyn Choi), who is going through puberty; and his elderly, disabled father (Cheung Tat-ming). With tight living quarters, noisy neighbors, and less than desirable living standards, the Lo family often find themselves at each other's necks over the smallest of inconveniences. Luckily, through a window in the living room lies a distant view of the beautiful ocean, which prevents the household from going insane. However, one day, the ocean view disappears after a billboard is illegally built on a neighboring building. With their only sense of relief in the crowded city gone, the Lo family begins to quarrel nonstop. In order to regain the peace within the household, the Lo family does everything in their power to remove the billboard and its owner, Wong Siu-choi (Louis Koo).

== Cast ==
=== Main cast ===
- Francis Ng as Lo Wai-man
- Louis Koo as Wong Siu-choi
- Anita Yuen as Suk-yin
- Cheung Tat-ming as Grandpa
- Lam Suet as Butcher

=== Special appearance ===
- Anthony Wong as Cheung
- Bowie Wu as Superintendent
- Lo Hoi-pang as Chan Tai-hung
- Law Kar-ying as Landlord
- Lawrence Cheng as District council representative
- Sam Lee as Environment protection officer

=== Other cast ===
- Elena Kong as Betrayed wife
- Evergreen Mak as Taxi driver
- Kingdom Yuen as Guidance counselor
- Lam Chi-chung as Mr. Lee
- Anna Ng as Woman arguing in bus
- Wilfred Lau as Man walking with dog
- 6-Wing as Mortgage company staff
- C Kwan as Mortgage company staff
- Joyce Cheng as CID officer
- Mak Ling-ling as House department officer
- Harriet Yeung as Real estate agent
- Tyson Chak as Advertising company staff
- Ng Siu-hin as Lo Bun-hong
- Jocelyn Choi as Lo Yu-sze
- Siupo Chan as Woman fighting for fish
- J. Arie as Nurse in mental hospital
- Anderson Junior as Commerce, Industry & Tourism branch officer
- Angelina Lo
- Yu Chi-ming as Fish stall hawker
- Strawberry Yeung as Real estate agent
- Ricky Wong as Male property viewer
- Celine Ma as Female property viewer
- Gill Mohindepaul Singh as Indian
- Bonnie Wong as Chan Tai-hung's wife
- Gladys Liu as Tenant
- Mandy Yiu as Female tenant
- Dickson Yuen
- Kong Ling-ling as Mrs. Chiu
- Renci Yeung as Property viewer
- Kitty Yuen as Wong Siu-choi's nurse

== Production ==
Filming for A Home with a View began on 11 December 2017 in Kwun Tong, where a blessing ceremony was held and was attended by director Herman Yau and cast members Francis Ng, Louis Koo, Anita Yuen, Cheung Tat-ming, Lawrence Cheng, Elena Kong and Evergreen Mak. The film is an adaptation of the play, Family Surprise, written by Cheung, who also serves as the film's producer and screenwriter while also donning elderly makeup to portray the role of Ng's father. Cheung revealed that he originally had no interest in playing the role, and it was originally a female character in the play, but he was persuaded by Ng to do so. Production for the film wrapped up in February 2018.

== Release ==
On 19 March 2018, the film was promoted at the 2018 Hong Kong Filmart, where its first poster and trailer was unveiled. There, it was also announced the film is slated to be released in the summer of 2018.

But it was then delayed and subsequently released in Hong Kong on 24 January 2019.
