= Stephen Au =

Hong Kong actor

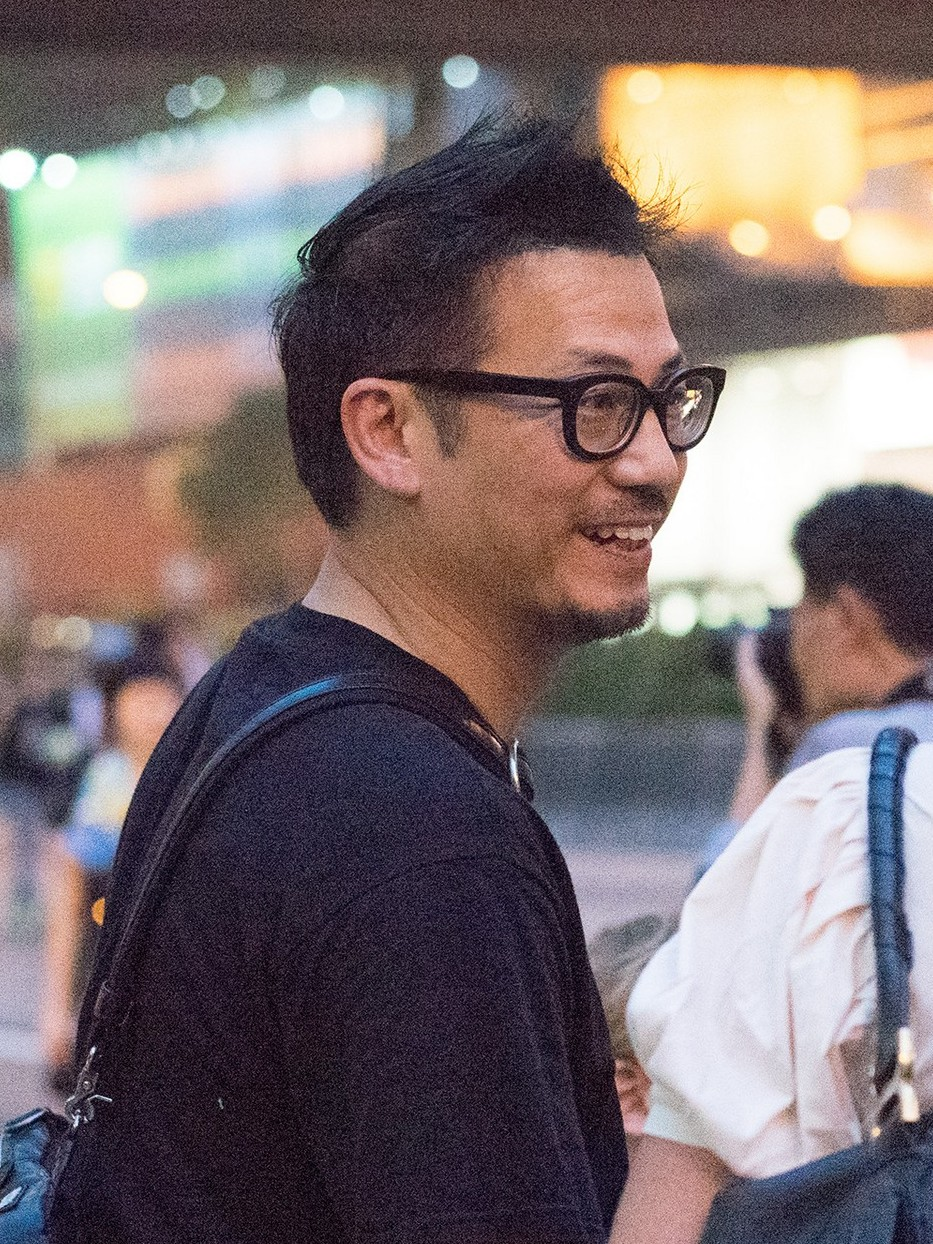
- Au in 2014
- Born: 26 April 1963 (age 63); British Hong Kong
- Occupation: Actor
- Years active: 1990-present

Chinese name
- Traditional Chinese: 歐錦棠
- Simplified Chinese: 欧锦棠
Transcriptions
Standard Mandarin
- Hanyu Pinyin: Ōu Jǐntáng
Yue: Cantonese
- Jyutping: Au1 Gam2 Tong4

Stephen Au Kam-tong (born 26 April 1963) is a Hong Kong actor for TVB (2000–present). He was formerly an actor for ATV (1990–2000).

He played David Mo (武紀勇) in TVB sitcom Best Selling Secrets (2007–2008). He also played the role of Yim Yue Dai (閆汝大) in TVB sitcom Off Pedder. Au is also a black belt in full contact karate.

== Filmography ==
=== Films ===
- The God of Cookery (1996) - MC for Stephen
- Forbidden City Cop (1996) - Presents Flying Fairy
- Bloody Friday (1996) - Ken
- July 13th (1996) - Lung's ghost son
- Banana Club (1996)
- Hong Kong Night Club (1998) - Michael
- You Light Up My Life (1998)
- Body Weapon (1999) - Officer Sam Lee
- Century Hero (1999)
- What You Gonna Do, Sai Fung (1999) - Sai-fung
- Tsimshatsui Floating Corpse (1999) (TV Movie)
- The Blood Rules (2000) - Tom
- A Game of No Rule (2000) - Officer Dick Ko
- Fatal Attraction (2000)
- A Decade of Love (2008)
- Overheard (2009) - Weber
- Once a Gangster (2010)
- Unbeatable (2013)
- That Demon Within (2014)
- Z Storm (2014)
- Little Big Master (2015)
- To the Fore (2015)
- Three (2016)
- Distinction (2018)
- Declared Legally Dead (2019)
- Ciao UFO (2019)
- The First Girl I Loved (2021)

=== Television ===
ATV

- Q Biu Je (Q表姐) (1990)
- Spirit of the Dragon (李小龍傳) (1992)
- Mythical Crane, Magic Needle '92 (仙鶴神針) (1992)
- Who is the Winner III (1993)
- Fist of Fury (1995) - Thai boxer
- Who is the Killer (1996)
- The Pride of Chao Zhou (1997)
- I Come From Guangzhou (1998)
- Flaming Brothers (1998)
- A Lawyer Can Be Good (1998)
- Ten Tigers Of Guangdong (1999)
- Showbiz Tycoon (2000) - Lui Lung, based on Bruce Lee

TVB

- Legal Entanglement (2002)
- A Case of Misadventure (2002)
- Burning Flame II (2002)
- Witness to a Prosecution II (2003)
- Ups and Downs in the Sea of Love (2003)
- Hard Fate (2004)
- Angels of Mission (2004) - Lee Tin Wah
- Strike at Heart (2004)
- The Biter Bitten (2005) - Gam Lam
- Real Kung Fu (2005) (episode 1 only)
- Placebo Cure (2006)
- The Legend of Love (2007)
- Best Selling Secrets (2007–2008) - David Mo
- Legend of the Demigods (2008)
- Off Pedder (2008–2010) - Yim Yue Dai
- Be Home for Dinner (2011)
- No Good Either Way (2012)
- ICAC Investigators 2014 (2014)

ViuTV

- Warriors Within (2020) - Main Role, Producer, Script Supervisor and Stunt coordinator
- We Got Game (2022) - Raymond
- Warriors Within 2 (TBA) - Main Role, Producer, Script Supervisor and Stunt coordinator
