= The Doctor in Spite of Himself (1999 film) =

1999 Hong Kong film by Lau Kwok Fai

- Film poster
- 醫神; Yee san
- Directed by: Lau Kwok Fai
- Written by: Raymond To
- Based on: Le Médecin malgré lui by Molière
- Produced by: Wong Bak-Ming
- Starring: Cheung Tat-ming; Ada Choi; Christine Ng
- Cinematography: Ally Wong Ka-Fai
- Music by: Ko Lam-Sang
- Production company: Mandarin Films Ltd.
- Distributed by: Mandarin Films Distribution Co. Ltd.
- Release date: 22 May 1999 (Hong Kong)
- Running time: 98 minutes
- Country: Hong Kong
- Language: Cantonese

The Doctor in Spite of Himself (simplified Chinese: 医神; traditional Chinese: 醫神; pinyin: Yee san) is a 1999 Hong Kong film based on the play Le Médecin malgré lui by Molière.

== Cast ==
- Cheung Tat-ming - Tin Sat, the doctor in spite of himself
- Ada Choi - Dong Kwai, his wife
- Christine Ng - Kei Chi
- Lai Yiu-Cheung - The servant
- Simon Lui - Ham Kam-kat, the suitor
- Elvis Tsui
- Leung Wing-Chung
- Benz Hui - The rich old man
- Mok Siu Chung - Administrator
- Gigi Fu - Administrator's sister
- Donna Chu
- Chan Kwok-Pong
