= Cheung Tat-ming =

Hong Kong actor, comedian, director and writer

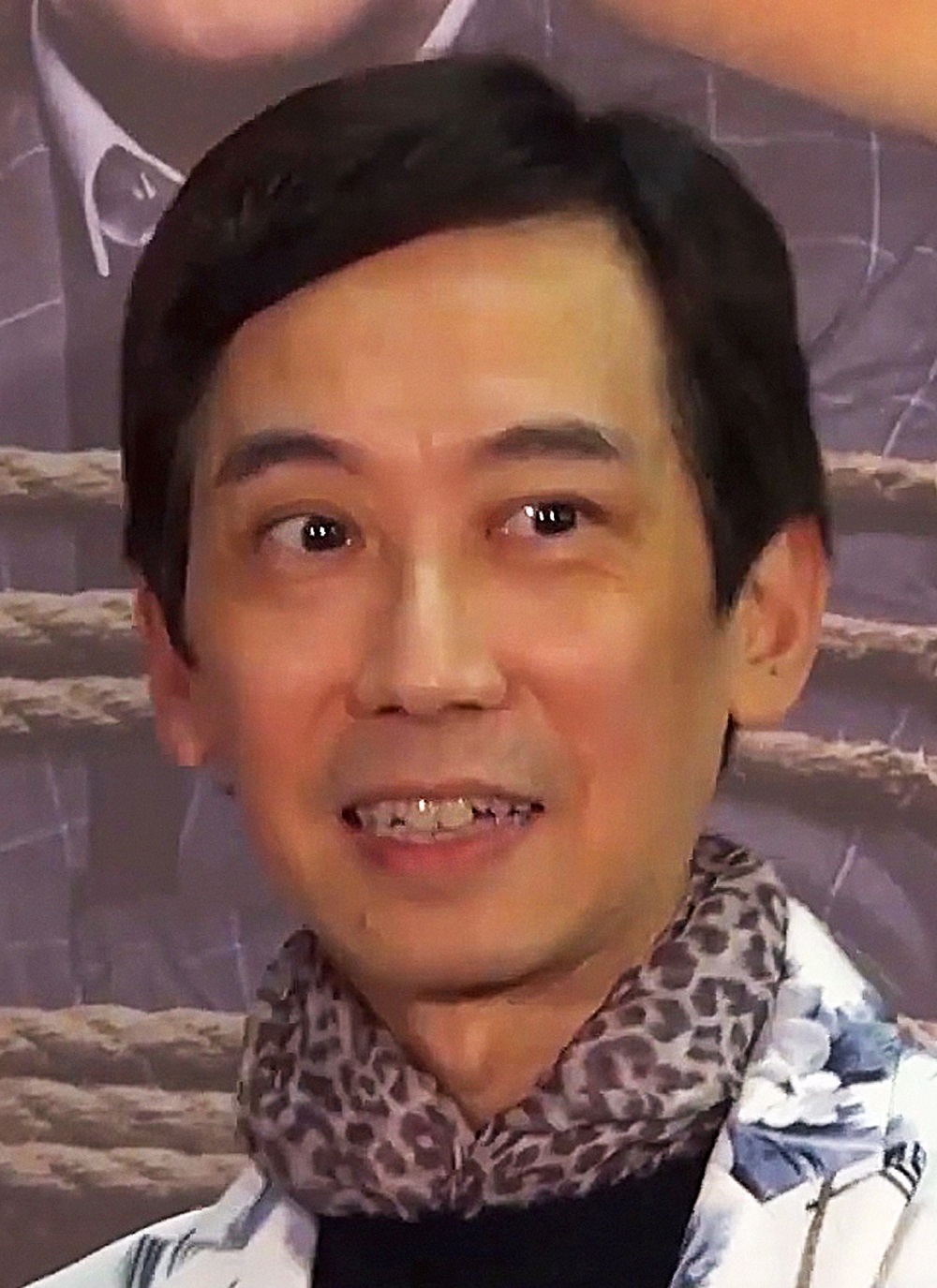
- Cheung in 2019
- Born: 2 July 1964 (age 62); Hong Kong
- Occupation: actor
- Years active: 1989–present
- Spouse: Dr. Nim-chi Ho (m. 2001)

Chinese name
- Traditional Chinese: 張達明
- Simplified Chinese: 张达明
Transcriptions
Standard Mandarin
- Hanyu Pinyin: Zhāng Dámíng
Yue: Cantonese
- Jyutping: Zeong1 Daat6 ming4

Cheung Tat-ming (Chinese: 張達明) (born 2 July 1964) is a Hong Kong actor, comedian, director and screenwriter.

== Personal life ==
Cheung married Ho Nim-chi, a psychiatrist, in September 2001, subsequently announcing their divorce in 2016. They had one son and one daughter.

== Filmography ==
=== As an actor ===
As of February 2026, Cheung has acted in at least 135 films since 1986.

- My Family (1986)
- Keep on Dancing (1988)
- My Heart Is That Eternal Rose (1989)
- Sunshine Friends (1990)
- Lee Rock II (1991)
- A Moment of Romance II (1993)
- The Golden Girls (1995)
- God of Gamblers 3: The Early Stage (1996)
- Once Upon a Time in Triad Society 2 (1996)
- Top Banana Club (1996)
- Till Death Do Us Laugh (1996)
- Feel 100%, Once More (1996)
- Lost and Found (1996)
- Banana Club (1996)
- Big Bullet (1996)
- Forbidden City Cop (1996)
- Lawyer Lawyer (1997)
- Troublesome Night 2 (1997)
- Troublesome Night 4 (1998)
- The Doctor in Spite of Himself (1999)
- A Wicked Ghost III: The Possession (2002)
- My Lucky Star (2003)
- The Legend of Lu Xiaofeng (2006)
- The Luckiest Man (2008)
- Love in a Puff (2010)
- Beauty on Duty (2010)
- Flirting Scholar 2 (2010)
- Bruce Lee, My Brother (2010)
- The Aroma City (2011)
- Love Shock (2011)
- Scary Market (2011)
- The Sorcerer and the White Snake (2011)
- Summer Love Love (2011)
- Fatal Invitation (2011)
- Good-for-Nothing Heros (2012)
- Everything Is Nothing (2012)
- Ultra Reinforcement (2012)
- Happy Hotel (2012)
- Moonlight Love (2012)
- The House (2013)
- Hello Babies (2014)
- An Inspector Calls (2015)
- House of Wolves (2016)
- Quiet Now! (2016)
- Always Be with You (2017)
- Agent Mr Chan (2018)
- A Home with a View (2019)
- The Incredible Monk 3 (2019)
- I'm Livin' It (2019) – Won Hong Kong Film Award for Best Supporting Actor
- Altar Angel (2019)
- Justice Sung Begins (2024)

=== As a screenwriter ===
- Come Fly the Dragon (1991)
- Three Summers (1992)
- Even Mountains Meet (1993)
- From Zero to Hero (1994)
- Funny Business (2000)
- A Home with a View (2019)

== TV series ==
- Happy Mother-in-Law, Pretty Daughter-in-Law (2010)
- Teen Waves (2007)
- Hearts of Fencing II (2004)
- Broadcast Life (2000)
- Life for Life (1999)
- Justice Sung II (1999)
- A Recipe for the Heart (1997)
- Justice Sung (1997)
- Soldier Soldier (1992)
- Yellowthread Street (1992)
