= Now You See Love, Now You Don't =

1992 Hong Kong film by Mabel Cheung and Alex Law

- VCD cover
- Traditional Chinese: 我愛扭紋柴
- Simplified Chinese: 我爱扭纹柴
- Hanyu Pinyin: Wǒ Ài Niǔ Wén Chái
- Jyutping: Ngo2 Ngoi3 Nau2 Man4 Caai4
- Directed by: Mabel Cheung; Alex Law
- Written by: Mabel Cheung; Alex Law
- Produced by: Terence Chang; Linda Kuk
- Starring: Chow Yun-fat; Carol Cheng; Teresa Mo; Carina Lau
- Cinematography: Poon Hang-sang
- Edited by: David Wu
- Music by: David Wu; Anthony Lun
- Production companies: Golden Princess Film Production; Milestone Pictures
- Distributed by: Golden Princess Amusement
- Release date: 1 February 1992 (Hong Kong)
- Running time: 97 minutes
- Country: Hong Kong
- Languages: Cantonese; Waitau
- Box office: HK$36,475,536

Now You See Love, Now You Don't is a 1992 Hong Kong comedy film written and directed by Mabel Cheung and Alex Law.

In this film, the chief character, played by Chow Yun-fat, who himself grew up in Lamma Island, consistently speaks the Waitau language.

== Cast ==
- Chow Yun-fat as Ng Shan-shui
- Carol Cheng as Firefly Kwok
- Teresa Mo as Dotty
- Carina Lau as Susan Chong
- Anthony Wong as Dunno
- Chan Fai-hung as Mr. Lam
- Wing Lam
- Lowell Lo as Piano player (cameo)
- Tam Sin-hung as Shan-shui's mother
- Richard Ng as English teacher (cameo)
- David Wu
- Ricky Shin as Kid in ice skating rink
- Chan Kit-ling (cameo)
- Lawrence Ah Mon (cameo)
- Yu Li (cameo)
- Dennis Chan as Man wearing hat (cameo)
- Tina Lau (cameo)
- Echo (cameo)
- Philip Chan (cameo)
- Irene Wan as Canoe girl (cameo)
- Joseph Cheng (cameo)
- Peter Lai (cameo)
- Bowie Lam as Waiter (cameo)
- Eric Chan (cameo)
- Fruit Chan as Policeman (cameo)
- Ng Kwok-kin as Policeman (cameo)
- Poon Hang-sang as No Teeth (cameo)
- Lo Fan as Big woman in red (cameo)
- So Tak-wa
- Simon Cheung as Policeman
- Terence Chang as Firefly's boss (cameo)

== Accolades ==
Accolades
Ceremony	Category	Recipient	Outcome
12th Hong Kong Film Awards	Best Supporting Actor	Anthony Wong	Nominated
12th Hong Kong Film Awards	Best Supporting Actress	Teresa Mo	Nominated
