= Weitou dialect =

Dialect of Yue Chinese

Weitou
- 圍頭話
- Native to: Hong Kong, Guangdong
- Native speakers: Under 10 thousand in Hong Kong
- Language family: Sino-Tibetan: Sinitic; Chinese; Yue; Yuehai; Guan–Bao; Weitou

Language codes
- ISO 639-3: None (mis)
- Glottolog: None

Weitou dialect
- Traditional Chinese: 圍頭話
- Simplified Chinese: 围头话
Transcriptions
Standard Mandarin
- Hanyu Pinyin: Wéitóuhuà
- Wade–Giles: Wei-tʻou-hua
Yue: Cantonese
- Jyutping: wai4 tau4 waa6-2

The Weitou dialect or Wai Tau dialect (Chinese: 圍頭話; Jyutping: wai4 tau4 waa2; lit. 'walled (village) language') is a dialect of Yue Chinese. It forms part of the Guan–Bao (莞寶片; Guǎn bǎo piàn) branch of Yuehai. It is spoken by older generations in Luohu and Futian districts in Shenzhen, and by those in the New Territories, Hong Kong.

The Weitou dialect can be heard in Hong Kong TV dramas and movies, and is usually used to depict characters who come from walled villages. For example, in the 1992 movie Now You See Love, Now You Don't, the chief character, played by Chow Yun-fat who himself grew up in Lamma Island, consistently speaks the Weitou dialect.

In a more general sense, Wai4 tau4 waa2 can refer to any variety of Chinese spoken in the villages of Hong Kong, including Hakka and rural Yue dialects. In contrast, most Hong Kong residents speak standard Cantonese, while most Shenzhen residents speak Mandarin.

== Phonology ==
Zhang & Zhuang (2003:21-4) records the phonological systems of three varieties of the Weitou dialect spoken in Hong Kong. Following is Fan Tin's (蕃田), San Tin (in IPA).

The 21 onsets
p	pʰ	b	f	w
t	tʰ	d		l
tʃ	tʃʰ		ʃ	j
k	kʰ	ɡ	h	
kʷ	kʷʰ	ɡʷ		

The 37 rimes
a		œ	ɔ	ɛ	i	u	y	
ai	ɐi	ɵy						
au	ɐu			eu				
am	ɐm			em				m
æŋ	ɐŋ	œŋ		ɛŋ			yœŋ	ŋ
		ɵŋ	oŋ	eŋ				
ap	ɐp			ep				
æk	ɐk	œk		ɛk			yœk	
		ɵk	ok	ek				

There are four tone contours, when the "entering tones" (stopped syllables) are ignored:

The 4 tones
tone name	contour	description
Yin Ping	˨˧ (23) or ˥ (55)	low rising or high
Yang Ping	˨˩ (21)	low
Shang	˧˥ (35)	high rising
Qu	˧ (33)	mid
