= Placebo Cure =

Hong Kong television series

- Promo poster
- 心理心裏有個謎
- Genre: Modern drama
- Written by: Lau Choi Wan; Choi Suk Yin
- Starring: Sunny Chan; Joyce Tang; Kevin Cheng; Cherie Kong; Stephen Au; Fiona Yuen
- Theme music composer: Lau Wai King
- Opening theme: Heart Knot (心結) by Hacken Lee
- Country of origin: Hong Kong
- Original language: Cantonese
- No. of episodes: 20

Production
- Producer: Kwan Wing Chung
- Production location: Hong Kong
- Camera setup: Multi camera
- Production company: TVB

Original release
- Network: TVB Jade
- Release: 19 October – 16 November 2006

Placebo Cure
- Traditional Chinese: 心理心裏有個謎
- Simplified Chinese: 心理心里有个谜
- Literal meaning: "A Riddle Inside Psychology"
Transcriptions
Standard Mandarin
- Hanyu Pinyin: Xīn Lǐ Xīn Lǐ Yǒu Gè Mí
Yue: Cantonese
- Jyutping: Sam1 Lei5 Sam1 Leoi5 Jau2 Go3 Mai5

Placebo Cure is a Hong Kong modern serial drama produced by TVB and starring Sunny Chan, Joyce Tang and Kevin Cheng. The drama was filmed from November 2003 to early 2004 and was first released overseas in May 2005. It was then aired in Hong Kong on Super Sun's TVB Drama channel from 30 May to 24 June 2005. It was then aired on TVB Jade from 19 October to 16 November 2006.

== Cast ==
=== Main cast ===
Cast	Role	Description
Sunny Chan	Man Ka Wo (Wallace) 萬家和	Psychology therapist Has erectile dysfunction and panic disorder on fork shaped items
Joyce Tang	Ying Ling San 應靈山	Feng Shui master Pretended to have dissociative identity disorder Cheung Cho Yiu's ex-girlfriend Man Ka Wo's girlfriend
Kevin Cheng	Cheng Cho Yiu (Joe) 張祖堯	Psychiatric; Pursued Fong Nga Yin and Ying Ling San
Cherie Kong (江芷妮)	Fong Nga Yin (Carmen) 方雅妍	Man Ka Wo's secretary Lesbian; Ying Fung's girlfriend Once tried to pursue Man Ka Wo
Stephen Au	Lung Kam Wai 龍錦威	Cop; Yu Siu Mei's husband Once has false pregnancy symptoms
Fiona Yuen	Yu Siu Mei (May) 余小薇	Masseur; Man Ka Wo's ex-girlfriend Lung Kam Wai's wife

=== Other cast ===
Cast	Role	Description
Law Lok Lam (羅樂林)	Man Ching Leung 萬正良	Man Ka Hing, Man Ka Wo and Man Ka Lok's father
Alice Fung So-bor	Man Tam Yuk Ying 萬談玉英	Man Ka Hing, Man Ka Wo and Ma Ka Lok's mother Elementary school principal
Gilbert Lam	Man Ka Hing (Jeff) 萬家興	Man Ka Wo's older brother
Natalie Tong	Man Ka Lok 萬家樂	Man Ka Hing and Man Ka Wo's younger sister
Samuel Kwok (郭峰)	Koo Yin 顧言	Man Ka Wo's teacher
Eileen Yeow	Ying Fung>br>邢楓	Nurse; Fong Nga Yin's girlfriend Lesbian
Felix Lok	Ying Tin Ming 應天命	Ying Ling San's father Feng Shui master Has a fear of fire Has post-traumatic stress disorder
Cecilia Fong (方伊琪)	Kong Lai Wah 江麗華	Fong Nga Yin's mother Ying Tin Ming's first love Yu Siu Mei's colleague Has hallucinations due to alcoholism
Koo Ming Wah (古明華)	Wan Kim Fei 雲劍飛	Ying Ling San's friend Loves Fong Nga Yin
Wong Man Piu (黃文標)	Fong Wing Yan 方永仁	Kong Lai Wah's ex-husband Fong Nga Yin's father Died from industrial accident ten years ago
Choi Kwok Hing (蔡國慶)	Father Lung 龍父	Lung Kam Wai's father
Lily Li	Mother Lung 龍母	Lung Kam Wai's mother
Marco Loo (盧永匡)	Kwong Boy 光仔	Drawing artist Has inherited yellow spots Loves Man Ka Lok
Lee Hoi Sang (李海生)	Father Kwong 光父	Kwong's father
Timothy Cheng (鄭子誠)	Wong Yiu Fu 黃耀富	Man Ka Hing's boss Has erectile dysfunction and touch deficit disorder hysteria
Ng Wai San (伍慧珊)	Mrs. Wong 黃太	Wong Yiu Fu's ex-wife
Fanny Ip (葉凱茵)	Chan Wing Kei (Angel, Joan) 陳詠琪	Had a relationship with Man Ka Hing; Has split personality
Johnathan Lee (李日昇)	Sing Boy 星仔	Has Tourette syndrome
Joseph Yeung (楊瑞麟)	Wai 阿偉	Ying Fung's ex-husband
Cindy Au	Fifi Wong	Singer; Has theft addiction
Steven Ho (何啟南)	Jimmy	Manager
Chuk Man Kwan (祝文君)	Stella	Man Ka Wo's former secretary
Eddie Li (李岡龍)		Stella's husband
Janice Shum (沈可欣)	Oliver	Once had breast cancer Has social panic disorder, anxiety disorder and sick of lies Fong Nga Yin's friend
Ngai Wai Man (魏惠文)	Ben	Candy's husband
So Lai Ming (蘇麗明)	Candy	Maggie's younger sister
Chan Nim Kwan (陳念君)	Maggie	Candy's older sister Has sleepwalking
Suen Kwai Hing (孫季卿)	Chow Pak 周伯	Man Ching Leung's friend Has Alzheimer's disease
Poon Chi Lui (潘芷蕾)		Chow Pak's daughter Deceased
Bruce Li (李鴻杰)		Salsa Club owner
Heidi Chu	Fa 阿花	Ying Tin Ming's ex-girlfriend Destroyed face due to fire burn
Claire Yiu	Kelly Wong	
Lam Pui Kwan (林佩君)	Tsang Kwok Kuen 曾國權	Kelly's wife Later transgender Changed name to Chung Wai Ching (鍾慧貞)
Kwok Tak Shun (郭德信)	Uncle Po 波叔	Has dependency disorder
Casper Chan (陳思齊)	Wing	Uncle Po's daughter
Stephen Wong	Rex	Wing's boyfriend
Karen Lee (李彩寧)	Yu Chit Fong 余哲芳	
Liu Kai-chi	Uncle Ping 平叔	Enjoys cross-dressing
Celine Ma (馬蹄露)	Lee Yuen Chi / Chung's mother 李沅芷/忠母	Cheng Wing Chung's mother Ying Ling San's Middle school classmate Had plastic surgery and made face similar to Chubg's mother
Deno Cheung (張松枝)	Cheng Wing Chung 鄭榮忠	Lee Yuen Chi's boyfriend Has Oedipus complex and schizophrenia
Kwong Cho Fai (鄺佐輝)		Cheung Cho Yiu's mother
Mary Hon		Cheung Cho Yiu's mother
Leung Kin Ping (梁建平)	Lam Chi Ping 林志平	Cindy's father
June Chan (陳琪)	Cindy	Had short term amnesia
Edward Mok (莫家堯)	Don	Cheung Cho Yiu's friend Cindy's lover
