= Some Day (TV series) =

- Official poster
- 天天天晴
- Genre: Modern Sitcom
- Starring: Louise Lee; Teresa Mo; Wayne Lai; Wong Hei; Kristal Tin; Lau Dan; Johnson Lee; Aimee Chan; Tsui Wing; Matt Yeung; Jason Chan
- Opening theme: Half Cup of Water (半杯水) by Tang Siu Hau (鄧小巧)
- Original language: Cantonese
- No. of episodes: 117

Production
- Producers: Catherina Tsang; Tsui Yu On
- Production location: Hong Kong
- Camera setup: Multi-camera
- Running time: 22 minutes (approx.)
- Production company: TVB

Original release
- Network: TVB Jade
- Release: 14 June – 28 November 2010

Some Day (Traditional Chinese: (天天天晴) is a TVB modern sitcom series.

== Cast ==
Ming family

Cast	Role	Description
Johnson Lee	Ming Lai-keung 明乃強	Age 40; Ming Sum-on, Ming Sai-on's uncle Likes Shek Hoi-yee; Married to an old sweetheart and had 3 children in episode 117
Louise Lee	Ming Sum-on 明心安	Age 55; Ming Sai-on's older sister Ming Nai-keung's niece
Wayne Lai	Simon Ming Sai-on 明世安	Age 38; Ming Sum-on's younger brother Ming Lai-keung's nephew Tsang Kiu's boyfriend, her husband in Chapter 117

Shek family

Cast	Role	Description
Lau Kong	Shek Yau-wai 石有為	Age 64; Ming Sum-on's brother-in-law
Suet Nei (雪妮)	Shek Ko Yim-yung 石高艷容	Age 56; Ming Sum-on's sister-in-law
Felix Lok	Shek Yau-shun 石有信	Ming Sum-on's husband (deceased) (Seen in flashback)
Aimee Chan	Lam Wai 林蕙	Shek Yau-shun's first wife (deceased) (Seen in flashback)
Louise Lee	Ming Sum-on 明心安	Shek Yau-shun's second wife
Aimee Chan	Shek Hoi-yee 石可兒	Age 23; Shek Yau-shun and Lam Wai's daughter / Ming Sum-On's stepdaughter
Lau Dan	Chu Bo 朱保	Age 58; Shek Yau-wai's cousin

Ma family

Cast	Role	Description
Chang Tse-sheng	Edmond Ma Hou-man 馬浩文	Age 42; Tsang Kiu's former husband Had an affair with Kitty but later broke up Returns to Hong Kong wanting to start over with Tsang Kiu and ask for her forgiveness. Was forgiven by Tsang Kiu but rejected his request to start over
Teresa Mo	Tsang Kiu 井喬	Age 38; Ming Sai-on's girlfriend Formerly married to Edmond Ma Hou-Man; Married to Ming Sai-on in episode 117

Other cast

Cast	Role	Description
Kristal Tin	Lam Ching-ling 藍靖鈴	Age 33; Ying Kwok-hing's mistress Tsang Kiu's best friend Lucas' girlfriend in episode 117
Law Tin Chi (羅天池)	Chu Dai-hung 朱大雄	Age 29; Employee at Lung Fook Jewellery; Chu Bo's apprentice
Tsui Wing	Kwok Wai-lung 郭偉龍	Age 35; Employee at Lung Fook Jewellery intellectually disabled due to an untreated fever as a boy.
Raymond Chiu (趙永洪)	Tony Lok Ka-chung 駱家聰	Age 30; Lung Fook store manager
Candy Cheung (張雪芹)	Kitty Fung Sau-no 馮秀娜	Age 23; Ming Sum-on's former secretary Edmond Ma Hou-Man's mistress, later broke up
Candice Chiu (趙希洛)	Mui Si-man 梅思敏	Age 24; Ming Sum-on's secretary
Mat Yeung (揚明)	Sin Pok 冼璞	Age 27; 89 restaurant employee
Wong Hei	Gau Man-fu 苟文虎	Age 43; Owner of 89 restaurant
Geoffrey Wong (黃子雄)	Leo Ying Kwok-hing 應國興	Age 45; Lam Ching-ling's boyfriend, eventually separated
Jason Chan (陳智燊)	Lucas Cui Jin-cheung 區展長	Age 28; Lam Ching-ling's subordinate Likes Lam Ching-ling; Was rejected by Lam Ching-ling, but becomes her boyfriend in episode 117
Skye Chan (陳倩揚)	Bernice	Lawyer; Likes Ming Sai-on but was rejected

== Awards and nominations ==
TVB Anniversary Awards (2010)

- Best Drama - Top 24
- Best Actress (Louise Lee) - Top 15
- Best Actress (Teresa Mo) - Top 15
- Best Supporting Actress (Aimee Chan) - Top 15
- My Favourite Male Character (Tsui Wing) - Top 15
- My Favourite Female Character (Louise Lee) - Top 15
- My Favourite Female Character (Teresa Mo) - Top 5

== Viewership ratings ==
	Week	Episodes	Average Points	Peaking Points	References
1	June 14–18, 2010	1 — 5	23	—	
2	June 21–25, 2010	6 — 10	25	—	
3	June 28 - July 2, 2010	11 — 15	23	—	
4	July 5–9, 2010	16 — 20	25	—	
5	July 12–16, 2010	21 — 25	25	—	
6	July 19–23, 2010	26 — 30	24	—	
7	July 26–30, 2010	31 — 35	24	—	
8	August 2–6, 2010	36 — 40	23	—	
9	August 9–13, 2010	41 — 45	23	—	
10	August 16–20, 2010	46 — 50	24	—	
11	August 24–27, 2010	51 — 53	24	—	
12	August 30 - September 3, 2010	54 — 58	26	—	
13	September 6–10, 2010	59 — 63	24	—	
14	September 13–17, 2010	64 — 68	23	—	
15	September 20–24, 2010	69 — 73	23	—	
16	September 27–30, 2010	74 — 77	23	—	
17	October 4–8, 2010	78 — 82	24	—	
18	October 11–15, 2010	83 — 87	23	—	
19	October 19–22, 2010	88 — 91	24	—	
20	October 25–29, 2010	92 — 96	24	—	
21	November 1–5, 2010	97 — 101	26	—	
22	November 8–12, 2010	102 — 106	26	29	
23	November 15–19, 2010	107 — 111	27	—	
24	November 22–26, 2010	112 — 116	26	—	
24	November 28, 2010	117	34	36	
