= The Legend of Love =

- Poster
- 牛郎織女
- Genre: Modern Drama
- Starring: Deric Wan; Sonija Kwok; Leila Tong; Stephen Au
- Opening theme: "非愛不可" by Gillian Chung & Kenny Kwan
- Country of origin: Hong Kong
- Original language: Cantonese
- No. of episodes: 20

Production
- Running time: approx. 45 minutes

Original release
- Network: TVB
- Release: March 7 – May 1, 2007

The Legend of Love (牛郎織女) is a 20 episode drama by TVB, filmed in 2002 and released overseas in June 2003. It was re-aired in 2004 on BTV, and in 2005 and 2007 on TVB channels. It is an adaptation of the story of The Cowherd and the Weaver Girl, with slight changes to the storyline.

== Cast ==
- Deric Wan as Wong Ah Ngau
- Sonija Kwok as Fu Tik Tik
- Stephen Au as Bei Goin
- Leila Tong as Bo Hei Jurk
- Liu Kai Chi as Wong Ah Ma
- Rain Lau as Cheung Yuk Fung
- Wilson Tsui as Ling Long
- Lau Kong as Gong Keurn
- Lily Leung as Wong Mo
- Angela Tong as Gong Ning
- Peter Lai as Ling Bak Sun
- Helena Law
- Vin Choi
- June Chan
