= Banana Club =

1996 Hong Kong film by Sin Chi-Wai

- Directed by: Sin Chi-Wai
- Written by: Wong Ho-Wa, Choi Ting-Ting
- Produced by: Kimmy Suen Ging-On
- Starring: Pauline Suen; Simon Lui Yue Yeung; Amanda Lee Wai-Man
- Cinematography: Tony Miu King-Fai
- Edited by: Choi Hung
- Distributed by: Mandarin Film Distribution Co, LTD.
- Release date: 13 April 1996
- Country: Hong Kong
- Language: Cantonese

Banana Club (正牌香蕉俱樂部) is a 1996 Hong Kong film directed by Sin Chi-Wai.

Banana Club is a romantic comedy about three radio DJs who search for love within their own radio station.

== Cast and roles ==
- Simon Lui - Yue Yeung
- Michael Chow - Mai Go
- Edmond Leung - Hiu Fung
- Pauline Suen - Vee
- Halina Tam Siu-Wan
- Amanda Lee
- Alvina Kong Yan-Yin
- Cheung Tat-ming
- Chan Ga-Bik
- Ben Lam Kwok-Bun
- Emily Kwan Bo-Wai
- Joey Leung Wing-Chung
- Thomas Lam Cho-Fai
- Stephen Au
- Daniel Chan
- Raymond Wong
- Julian Cheung
- Dang Siu-Juen
- Tats Lau Yi-Dat
- Nelson Cheung Hok-Yun
- Money Lo
- Nnadia Chan (cameo)

== Crew ==
- Director: Sin Chi-Wai
- Editor: Choi Hung
- Script Supervisor: Fung Oi-Lei
- Cinematographer: Tony Miu King-Fai
- Art Director: Wilson Lam Wai-Sum
- Costume Designer: Rick Chin
- Sound Recordist: Hoh Ging-Man
