= Jessica Hsuan filmography =

This article presents the filmography of Hong Kong film and television actress, producer and recording artiste Jessica Hsuan.

== Television series ==
Year	Title	Role	Awards	Notes
1993	The Edge of Righteousness	Yip Man		
1993	Burden of Proof	Lui Kit Ling		TV movie
1993	Twilight Tubes Part I			a.k.a. Twilight Tubes I
1993	The Modern Love Story I	Siu Hsuan		a.k.a. Modern Love Story I
1994	Eternity	Ho Chin Wai		
1994	The Master of Martial Arts	Lam Sau Ching		
1994	Happy Harmony	Mo Tsz Ching		
1994	Class of Distinction	Cheung Sum Yi		
1994	Passion Among Us	Lau Mei Bo		
1994	Women's Diary II	Yu Po Man		
1995	File of Justice IV	Samantha Ching Yeuk Fai		
1995	A Good Match from Heaven	Hung Sze Sze		
1995	Mary's Choice	Mary		TV movie
1996	Cold Blood Warm Heart	Michelle Cheung Suet Ying		
1996	Outburst	Lam Sin		
1996	She Was Married to a Mob	Tam Wing Hung		TV movie
1997	File of Justice V	Samantha Ching Yeuk Fai		
1997	Old Time Buddy	Siu Fong Fong / Ko Sau Ping		
1997	A Recipe for the Heart	Leung Song Song		
1998	Secret of the Heart	Kelly Tung Yeuk Yin		
1998	Rural Hero	Wong On Sum		
1999	Man's Best Friend	Wing Man Wing Long		
1999	Detective Investigation Files IV	Quin Mo Chiu Kwan	TVB Award for Best Actress	
1999	Game of Deceit	Kong Yuk Lun		
1999	Witness to a Prosecution	Tong Sze		
2000	When Dreams Come True	Cheung Mei Chun		
2000	A Matter of Customs	Moon Fung Moon Fan	TVB Award for My Favourite Television Character	
2001	A Step into the Past	Wu Ting Fong	TVB Award for My Favourite Television Character	
2002	Where Is My Love	Shu Yue		
2002	Invisible Journey	Lam Lok Yi		
2002	Burning Flame II	Choi Siu Ling		Guest star
2002	Golden Faith	Rachel Ching Tin Nam	TVB Award for My Favourite Television Character	
2002	Square Pegs	Ling Choi Fung	TVB Award for My Favourite Television Character; TVB Award for My Favourite On-Screen Partners	
2003	Eternity: A Chinese Ghost Story	Sze Ma Hung Yip / Yin Hung Yip	Sina Award for Best Style Actress 2007	
2003	Love Paradise	Yau Yau		
2004	Lady Fan	Fan Lei Fa	TVB Award for My Favourite Television Character	
2004	A Handful of Love	Kuk Wai Ting		
2005	Just Love	Honor Ko Hei Man		
2005	Life Made Simple	Catherine Wong Kei Fung	Nominated – TVB Award for Best Actress	
2006	Dicey Business	Li Ching Wan	Nominated – TVB Award for Best Actress; Nominated – TVB Award for My Favourite Female Character	
2007	Parental Guidance	Ling Toh	Nominated – Best Comedy Performance by an Actress, 2007 Asian Television Awards	Singapore series (English)
2007	The Drive of Life	Carmen Wah Ching Yu		
2008	Healing Souls	Koo Nam		
2008	Parental Guidance 2	Ling Toh		Singapore series (English)
2009	Just Love II	Honor Ko Hei Man		
2009	ICAC Investigators 2009	Annie Kwok Yuet Man		
2010	Sisters of Pearl	Chu Pik Ha		
2010	A Pillow Case of Mystery II	Ng Kwan Yau	Nominated – TVB Award for Best Actress	–
2010	Gun Metal Grey	Kim Hui Man Him		
2011	Bountiful Blessings	Huang Fu Xi		Singapore series (Mandarin)
2011	Curse of the Royal Harem	Niuhuru Yee-lan	Nominated — TVB Anniversary Award for Best Actress	
2012	Love Amongst War	Wang Bao Chuan		
2012	Tiger Cubs	Chong Cheuk Wah		
2012	Refresh 3+7	Yue Jing		
2012	Living in New Town	Hu Tao		
2013	Tian Huo	Hua Yi Lian		Shooting completed in 2006, due to copyright issue, broadcast delayed till 2013
2013	The War of Beauties	Ma Fu Fang		
2015	Elite Brigade III			
2016	The Hiddens	Wai Ming		
2017	My Unfair Lady	Molly Ling Man	Nominated - StarHub TVB Award for Favorite Actress Nominated - StarHub TVB Award for Favourite Female TV Characters TVB Star Awards Malaysia for Favourite TVB Actress People's Choice Television Award for Best Actress Hong Kong Television Award for Best Leading Actress in Drama Series	
2017	Line Walker: The Prelude	Scarlett Sze Ka Lei		
2019	Listening Snow Tower	Hua Lian		
2020	The Twin Flower Legend			
2021	Armed Reaction 2021	Diana Tai On Na	Nominated — TVB Anniversary Award for Best Actress; Nominated — TVB Anniversary Award for Most Popular Female Character; Nominated — TVB Anniversary Award for Most Popular Onscreen Partnership (shared with Moses Chan); Nominated — TVB Anniversary Award for Favourite TVB Actress in Malaysia; Nominated — People's Choice Television Award for Best Actress (Top 10); Nominated - People's Choice Television Awards for Best TV Drama Partnership (shared with Moses Chan)	
2023	A Perfect Gentleman			ViuTV series, main role
2024	Kill Sera Sera	Ruoyun		Singaporean series

== Film ==
Year	Title	Role	Notes
1993	Tom, Dick and Hairy	at restaurant with dating group	
1993	Flirting Scholar	Ha Heung	
1993	Tigers - The Legend of Canton	woman bullied by A Yan	
1995	01:00 A.M.		
1996	Ah Kam	murdered prostitute	a.k.a. The Stuntwoman a.k.a. Ah Kam: Story of a Stuntwoman
1996	Mr. Mumble	Wai Heung	US Title: City Hunter 2
1997	Up for the Rising Sun	Tung Chen	
1997	Hero	Kim Ling Tze	
1997	The Hunted Hunter	Li San-San (Susan)	
1999	The Masked Prosecutor	Wan Chi Ha (Ada)	
2000	And I Hate You So	Denise Ma	
2000	Hardcore Poisoned Eyes	Ellie	
2015	The Kid from the Big Apple	Sophia Lin	
2016	Good Take!		
2016	Fooling Around Jiang Hu		
2018	L Storm	Dr. Anson Au	
2019	A Witness Out of the Blue	Joy Ting	
2021	G Storm	Emma Fong	
2026	Back to the Past	Wu Ting Fong	

== Other appearances ==
Year	Title	Role	Notes
2019	Ant-Man and The Wasp: Nano Battle!	Leslie Lam	Hong Kong Disneyland

== See also ==
- List of awards and nominations received by Jessica Hsuan
