= Jonathan Chik =

- Occupations: Television producer, director, writer, actor
- Years active: 1990s–present
- Partner: Rachel Kan
- Awards: TVB Anniversary Awards – Best Drama; 2004 War and Beauty; 2012 When Heaven Burns

Chinese name
- Traditional Chinese: 戚其義
- Simplified Chinese: 戚其义
Transcriptions
Standard Mandarin
- Hanyu Pinyin: Qī Qíyì
Yue: Cantonese
- Jyutping: Cik1 Kei4 Ji6
- Musical career
- Also known as: Ah Chik
- Origin: Hong Kong

Jonathan Chik Gei-yee is a Hong Kong television producer, director, and writer. Chik joined TVB in 1976 as a production assistant. He was an assistant for Kam Kwok-leung, who supported his career. In the early 1990s, Chik left TVB to work as a producer for ATV. Promoted to executive producer, he returned to TVB in 1994. He remained as a producer for TVB until 2012.

Chik frequently collaborates with screenwriter Chow Yuk-ming. Chik's works has won 9 awards at the TVB Anniversary Awards, including Best Drama for 2011's When Heaven Burns.

== Filmography ==
As actor
Year	English title	Chinese title	Role	Notes
1992	Justice, My Foot!	審死官	Yiu Tai	

As producer
Year	English title	Chinese title	Key	Notes
1992	The Butcher School Master	點解阿sir係隻鬼	BS	
1992	Spirit of the Dragon	李小龍傳	SD	
1993	The Butcher School Master	點解阿sir係隻鬼II	B2	
1994	The Movie Tycoon	戲王之王	MT	
1995	The Criminal Investigator	O記實錄	CI	
1996	Cold Blood Warm Heart	天地男兒	CB	
1996	The Criminal Investigator II	O記實錄II	C2	
1998	Secret of the Heart	天地豪情	SH	TVB Anniversary Award for Best Actor (Gallen Lo); TVB Anniversary Award for Best Actress (Ada Choi); TVB Anniversary Award for Most Improved Male Artiste (Nick Cheung)
1999	Feminine Masculinity	先生貴性	FM	TVB Anniversary Award for My Favourite On-Screen Partners (Dramas) (Gallen Lo, Flora Chan)
1999	At the Threshold of an Era	創世紀	TE	
2000	At the Threshold of an Era II	創世紀II天地有情	T2	TVB Anniversary Award for My Top 12 Favourite Television Characters(Gallen Lo); TVB Anniversary Award for My Top 12 Favourite Television Characters(Louis Koo); TVB Anniversary Award for My Top 12 Favourite Television Characters (Liza Wang)
2000	Healing Hands II	妙手仁心II	H2	TVB Anniversary Award for My Top 13 Favourite Television Characters (Lawrence Ng); TVB Anniversary Award for My Favourite On-Screen Partners (Dramas) (Lawrence Ng, Ada Choi)
2004	Blade Heart	血薦軒轅	BH	
2004	War and Beauty	金枝慾孽	WB	TVB Anniversary Award for Best Drama; TVB Anniversary Award for Best Actor (Bowie Lam); TVB Anniversary Award for Best Actress (Gigi Lai); TVB Anniversary Award for Best Supporting Actor (Chan Hung-lit); TVB Anniversary Award for Best Supporting Actress (Sheren Tang); TVB Anniversary Award for My Top 12 Favourite Television Characters(Sheren Tang); TVB Anniversary Award for My Top 12 Favourite Television Characters(Charmaine Sheh); TVB Anniversary Award for My Top 12 Favourite Television Characters(Gigi Lai); TVB Anniversary Award for My Top 12 Favourite Television Characters(Bowie Lam); TVB Anniversary Award for My Top 12 Favourite Television Characters(Moses Chan); Next TV Award for Top Ten Television Programmes (#1)
2005	Healing Hands III	妙手仁心III	H3	
2006	Dance of Passion	火舞黃沙	DP	TVB Anniversary Award for Best Supporting Actor (Kenny Wong); Next TV Award for Top Ten Television Programmes (#10)
2006	C.I.B. Files	刑事情報科	CF	
2008	The Gem of Life	珠光寶氣	GL	Next TV Award for Top Ten Television Programmes (#2)
2010	Fly with Me	飛女正傳	FM	
2011	When Heaven Burns	天與地	WH	TVB Anniversary Award for Best Drama; Next TV Award for Top Ten Television Programmes (#1); Starhub TVB Award for Best Drama; Yahoo! Buzz Award for Most Popular TV Drama; Asian Television Award for Best Actor (Moses Chan); Starhub TVB Award for My Favourite TVB Male Character (Moses Chan); Starhub TVB Award for My Favourite TVB Female Character (Charmaine Sheh)
2012	Let It Be Love	4 in Love	4L	Next TV Award for Top Ten Television Programmes (#10)
2012	Master of Play	心戰	MP	
2013	Fight for Love	談談情·練練武	FL	2004 Warehoused drama
2013	Beauty at War	金枝慾孽（貳）	BW	

== Frequent collaborators ==
Artiste	BS	SD	B2	MT	CI	CB	C2	SH	FM	TE	T2	H2	FL	BH	WB	H3	DP	CF	GL	FM	WH	4L	MP	BW
Kenix Kwok					Yes		Yes			Yes	Yes													
Flora Chan									Yes	Yes	Yes	Yes												
Chan Hung-lit															Yes		Yes		Yes	Yes				
Moses Chan												Yes			Yes	Yes	Yes		Yes	Yes	Yes	Yes	Yes	Yes
Rebecca Chan															Yes		Yes		Yes				Yes	
Sunny Chan	Yes		Yes		Yes		Yes	Yes		Yes	Yes													
Catherine Chau																	Yes	Yes	Yes	Yes	Yes			
Adam Cheng						Yes								Yes									Yes	
Raymond Cho												Yes				Yes				Yes				Yes
Ada Choi								Yes		Yes	Yes	Yes					Yes		Yes	Yes				Yes
Rachel Kan																	Yes	Yes	Yes	Yes	Yes	Yes	Yes	Yes
Florence Kwok									Yes								Yes		Yes			Yes		
Kwong Wa		Yes		Yes					Yes															
Bowie Lam												Yes	Yes		Yes	Yes	Yes	Yes	Yes		Yes			
Gigi Lai							Yes								Yes	Yes	Yes		Yes					
Gallen Lo						Yes	Yes	Yes	Yes	Yes	Yes													
Christine Ng				Yes		Yes												Yes						Yes
Charmaine Sheh															Yes		Yes				Yes	Yes		
Maggie Shiu										Yes	Yes	Yes				Yes	Yes	Yes	Yes		Yes		Yes	
Sheren Tang												Yes			Yes									Yes
Liza Wang										Yes	Yes			Yes										
Wi Kar-hung							Yes								Yes					Yes		Yes		Yes
Felix Wong					Yes		Yes	Yes																
Kenny Wong												Yes	Yes	Yes	Yes	Yes	Yes	Yes	Yes	Yes	Yes	Yes	Yes	Yes
