= TVB Anniversary Award for Best Actor =

Hong Kong television award

- Awarded for: "Best Performance by an Actor in a Leading Role"
- Country: Hong Kong
- Presented by: Television Broadcasts Limited (TVB)
- First award: 1997
- Currently held by: Owen Cheung - No Room For Crime (2024)
- Website: http://birthday.tvb.com/

The TVB Anniversary Award for Best Actor in a Leading Role is one of the TVB Anniversary Awards presented annually by Television Broadcasts Limited (TVB) to recognize an actor who has delivered an outstanding performance in Hong Kong television dramas throughout the designated year. This award is usually reserved to be one of the last awards presented, and is one of the most premier and publicized awards of the ceremony. An actor who wins Best Actor is referred to as the TV King (視帝).

Since its institution in 1997, the award has changed names several times. It was first called Best Performance by an Actor in a Drama (最佳劇中男角演繹大獎) in 1997, but was changed to Best Actor in a Leading Role (最佳男主角) in 1998. In 1999, the name was changed to My Favourite Leading Actor of the Year (本年度我最喜愛的男主角). The name was changed back to "Best Actor in a Leading Role" in 2005.

== Winners and nominees ==
TVB nominates at least ten actors for the category each year. The following table lists only the actors who have made it to the top five nominations during the designated awards ceremony.

Table key
†	Indicates the winner

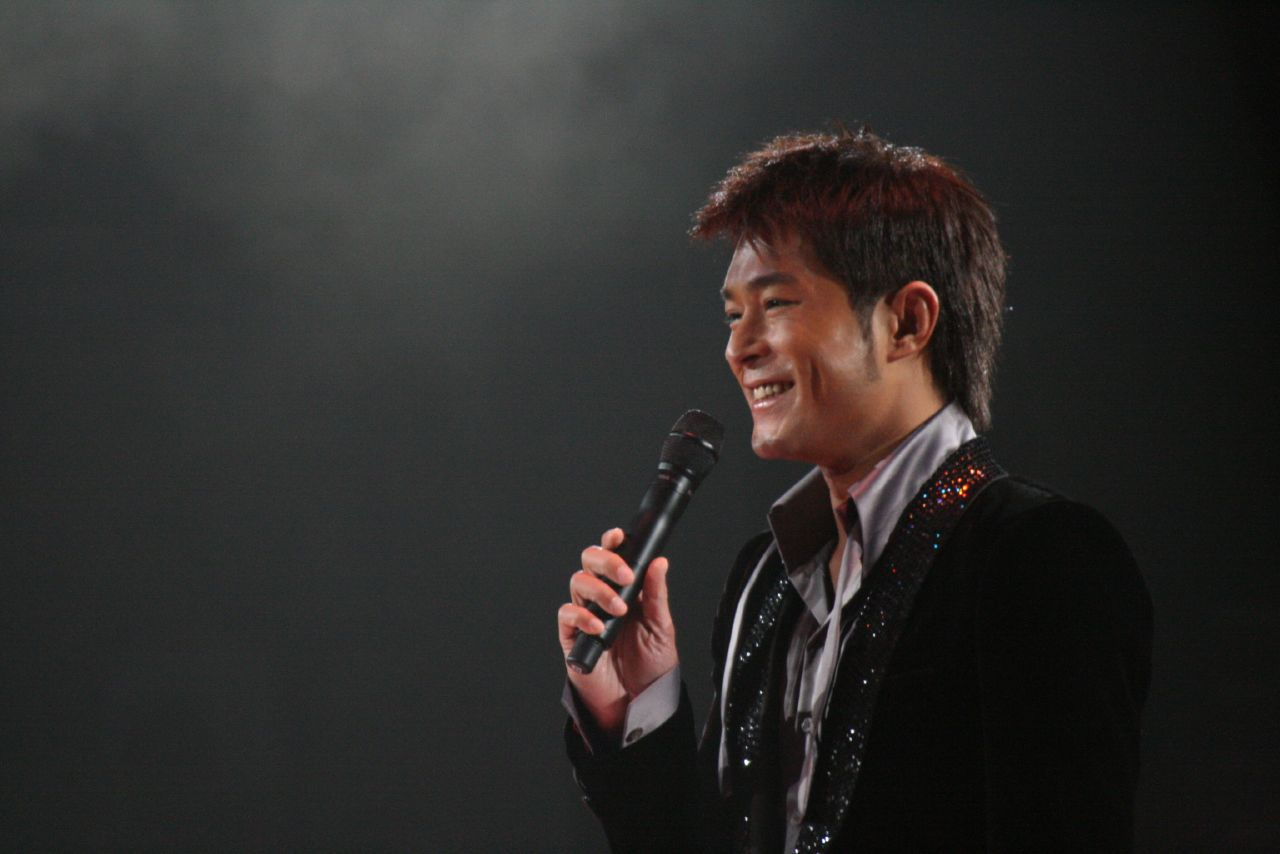
Louis Koo won in 1999 for his performance in Detective Investigation Files IV. At 29, he was the youngest Best Actor winner in record. Koo won again in 2001, for his performance in A Step into the Past.

=== 1990s ===
Year	Actor	Drama	Role(s)
1997 (1st)	Gallen Lo †	Old Time Buddy	Lee Kei
1997 (1st)	Wong He	Deadly Protection	Chan Fu-gwai
1997 (1st)	Cheung Tat-ming	Justice Sung	Sung Sai-kit (Justice Sung)
1997 (1st)	Francis Ng	Old Time Buddy	Tse Yuen
1997 (1st)	Gordon Lam	Time Before Time	Luk Wan-kwong / Hui Dai-kwong
1997 (1st)	Bobby Au-yeung	Taming of the Princess	Kwok Oi
1997 (1st)	Felix Wong	Demi-Gods and Semi-Devils	Kiu Fung
1997 (1st)	Benny Chan	Demi-Gods and Semi-Devils	Duen Yu
1998 (2nd)	Gallen Lo †	Secret of the Heart	Winson "Big Head Man" Cheuk
1998 (2nd)	Bobby Au-yeung	Armed Reaction	IP Chan Siu-sang
1998 (2nd)	Lawrence Ng Kai-wah	Healing Hands	Dr. Paul Ching
1998 (2nd)	Bowie Lam	Healing Hands	Dr. Henry Lai
1998 (2nd)	Louis Koo	I Can't Accept Corruption	Fong Cheuk-man
1999 (3rd)	Louis Koo †	Detective Investigation Files IV	SGT Tsui Fei
1999 (3rd)	Wong He	Burning Flame	Lok Tin-yau
1999 (3rd)	Bobby Au-yeung	Happy Ever After	Tai Tung-gun
1999 (3rd)	Gallen Lo	Feminine Masculinity	Tai Bing-kuen / Diana Szema
1999 (3rd)	Nick Cheung	Game of Deceit	Yu Chung-ching

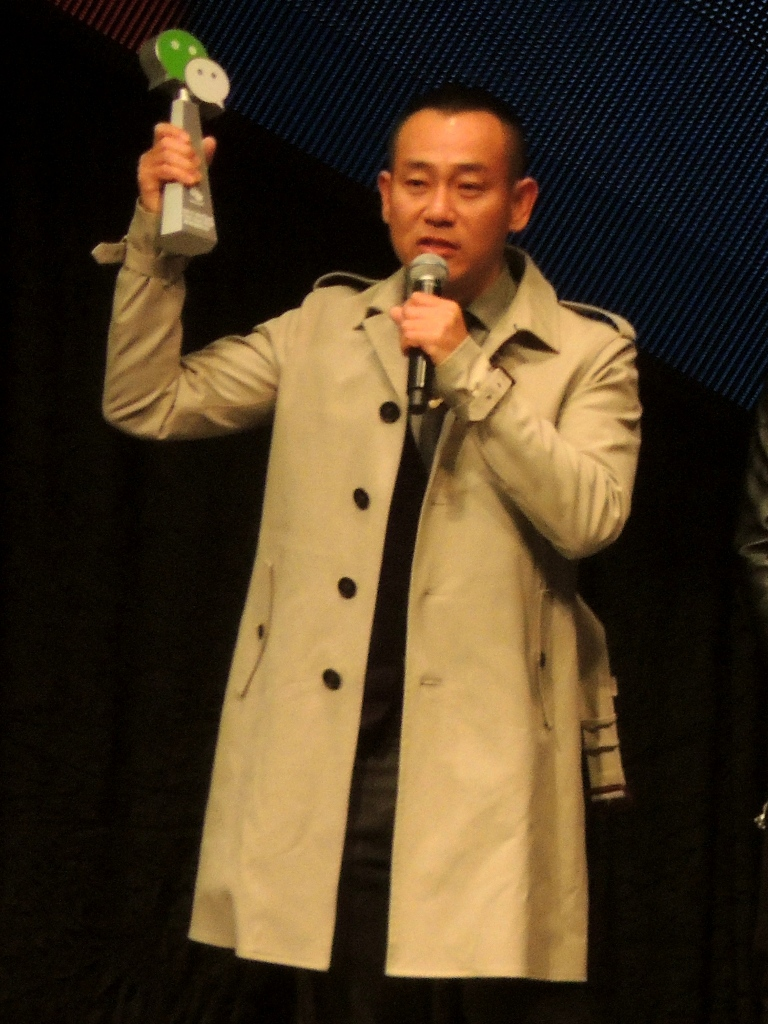
Bowie Lam won in 2004 for his performance in War and Beauty.

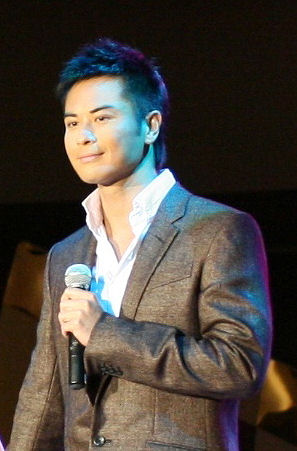
Kevin Cheng won in 2006 for his performance in Under the Canopy of Love. He won again in 2011 for Ghetto Justice.

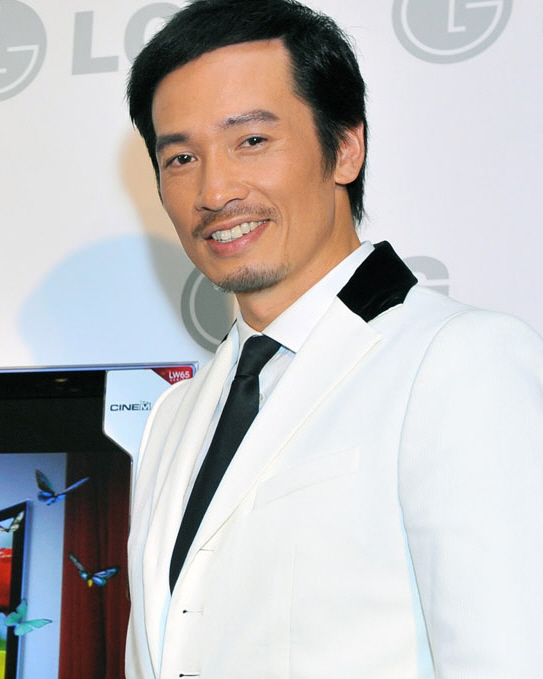
Moses Chan won in 2007 for his performance in Heart of Greed.

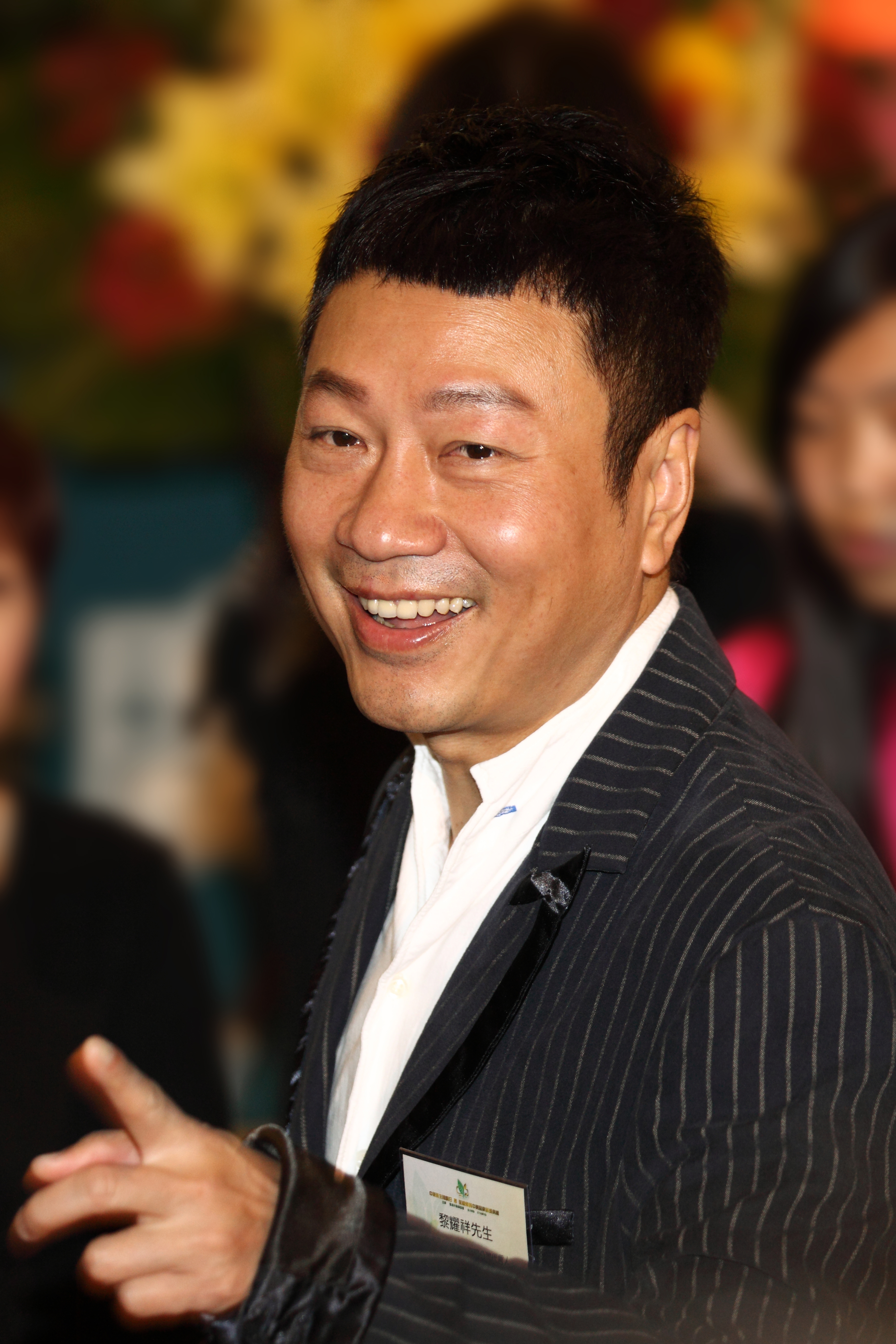
Wayne Lai won three of his six top nominations, including his performances from 2009's Rosy Business, 2010's No Regrets, and 2012's The Confidant.

=== 2000s ===
Year	Actor	Drama	Role(s)
2000 (4th)	Bobby Au-yeung †	Witness to a Prosecution	Sung Chee
2000 (4th)	Dayo Wong	War of the Genders	Yu Lok-tin (Ah Lok)
2000 (4th)	Lawrence Ng Kai-wah	The Threat of Love	Ko Chun-bong
2000 (4th)	Gallen Lo	At the Threshold of an Era	Tim Yip
2000 (4th)	Julian Cheung	Return of the Cuckoo	Man Chor
2001 (5th)	Louis Koo †	A Step into the Past	Hong Siu-lung
2001 (5th)	Lawrence Ng Kai-wah	Healing Hands II	Dr. Paul Ching
2001 (5th)	Bowie Lam	Healing Hands II	Dr. Henry Lai
2001 (5th)	Bobby Au-yeung	Armed Reaction III	SIP Chan Siu-sang
2001 (5th)	Gallen Lo	Seven Sisters	Tse Chi-tong
2002 (6th)	Gallen Lo †	Golden Faith	Ivan Ting
2002 (6th)	Steven Ma	Where the Legend Begins	Cho Chik (Cho Chi-kin)
2002 (6th)	Raymond Lam	Eternal Happiness	Wongpo Siu-wah
2002 (6th)	Paul Chun	Family Man	Ko Hoi
2002 (6th)	Moses Chan	Family Man	Kelvin Siu
2003 (7th)	Roger Kwok †	Square Pegs	Ting Sheung-wong
2003 (7th)	Bobby Au-yeung	Take My Word For It	CIP Pang Kwok-tung
2003 (7th)	Julian Cheung	Take My Word For It	Officer Yeung Kwong
2003 (7th)	Kwong Wa	The King of Yesterday and Tomorrow	Yongzheng Emperor / Lee Dai-ha
2003 (7th)	Francis Ng	Triumph in the Skies	Samuel "Sam" Tong
2004 (8th)	Bowie Lam †	War and Beauty	Imperial Doctor Suen Bak-yeung
2004 (8th)	Joe Ma	Lady Fan	Sit Ting-shan
2004 (8th)	Dayo Wong	To Catch the Uncatchable	Detective Mok Chok-tung
2004 (8th)	Roger Kwok	To Get Unstuck In Time	SIP Ho Tin-kwong (Morning Sir)
2004 (8th)	Bobby Au-yeung	Shine on You	Ka Jai-choi
2005 (9th)	Roger Kwok †	Life Made Simple	Ting Sheung-wong
2005 (9th)	Chung King-fai	My Family	Man Taai-loi
2005 (9th)	Michael Miu	The Academy	SGT Lee Man-sing
2005 (9th)	Moses Chan	The Gentle Crackdown	Magistrate Sui Tung-lau
2005 (9th)	Joe Ma	Revolving Doors of Vengeance	Martin Ko
2006 (10th)	Kevin Cheng †	Under the Canopy of Love	Alan Shum
2006 (10th)	Raymond Lam	La Femme Desperado	Chai Foon (Ah Dee)
2006 (10th)	Bowie Lam	The Dance of Passion	Yim Man-hei
2006 (10th)	Moses Chan	The Dance of Passion	Sung Tung-sing
2006 (10th)	Joe Ma	Maidens' Vow	Yu Chi / Lee Kat-cheung / Tai Lap-yan / Fong Ka-on (K.O.)
2007 (11th)	Moses Chan †	Heart of Greed	Tong Chi-on (Duk Duk Dei)
2007 (11th)	Bobby Au-yeung	Dicey Business	Chai Foon-cheung
2007 (11th)	Ha Yu	Heart of Greed	Tong Yan-kai
2007 (11th)	Damien Lau	The Drive of Life	Wah Man-hon
2007 (11th)	Raymond Lam	The Drive of Life	Wah Tsan-bong
2008 (12th)	Ha Yu †	Moonlight Resonance	Kam Tai-jo
2008 (12th)	Roger Kwok	D.I.E.	Officer Yu Chi-long
2008 (12th)	Moses Chan	Moonlight Resonance	Kam Wing-ka
2008 (12th)	Raymond Lam	Moonlight Resonance	Kam Wing-ho
2008 (12th)	Kevin Cheng	Last One Standing	Cheung Sing-hei
2009 (13th)	Wayne Lai †	Rosy Business	Chai Kau
2009 (13th)	Steven Ma	Sweetness in the Salt	Nip Chi-yuen
2009 (13th)	Bosco Wong	Burning Flame III	Fong Lee-hon
2009 (13th)	Dayo Wong	You're Hired	Mak Tai-song
2009 (13th)	Moses Chan	Beyond the Realm of Conscience	Lee Yi, Emperor Xuānzong of Tang

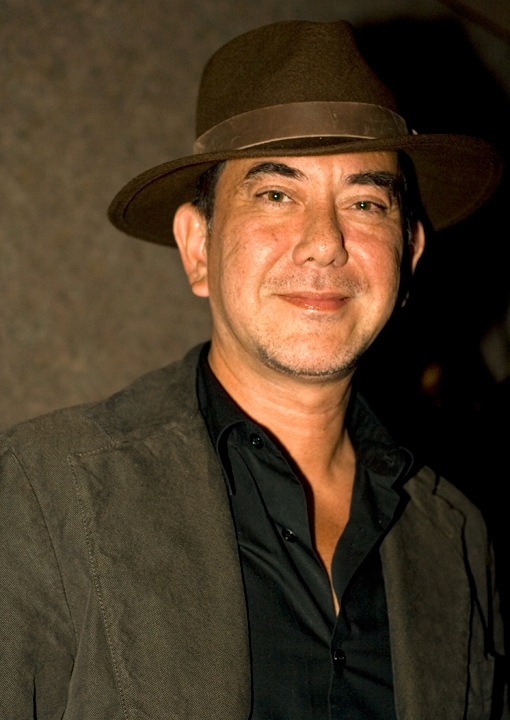
Anthony Wong won in 2015 for his performance in Lord of Shanghai.

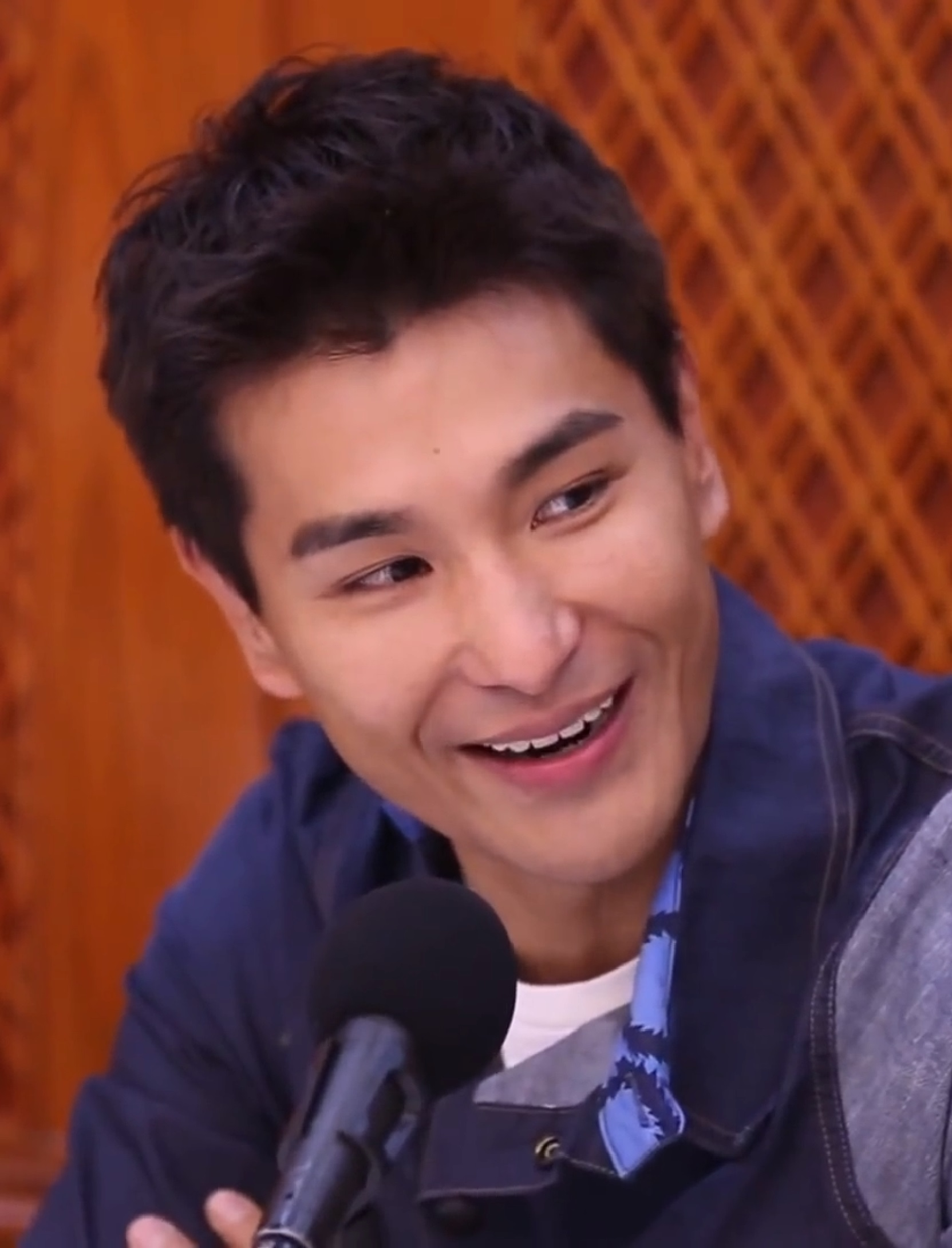
Ruco Chan received five top nominations and won in 2016 for his performance in A Fist Within Four Walls.

=== 2010s ===
Year	Actor	Drama	Role(s)
2010 (14th)	Wayne Lai †	No Regrets	Lau Sing
2010 (14th)	Raymond Lam	The Mysteries of Love	Professor Kingsley King
2010 (14th)	Steven Ma	Ghost Writer	Po Chung-ling
2010 (14th)	Moses Chan	Can't Buy Me Love	Kam Tuo-luk
2010 (14th)	Felix Wong	Gun Metal Grey	SGT Shek Tung-sing (Stone Sir)
2011 (15th)	Kevin Cheng †	Ghetto Justice	L.A. Law (Law Ba)
2011 (15th)	Moses Chan	Yes, Sir. Sorry, Sir!	Law Yiu-wah (Law Sir)
2011 (15th)	Michael Tse	Lives of Omission	SSGT Leung Siu-tong (Laughing)
2011 (15th)	Bosco Wong	Lives of Omission	Michael "Crippled Co" So
2011 (15th)	Wayne Lai	Forensic Heroes III	Dr. Jack "Pro Sir" Po
2012 (16th)	Wayne Lai †	The Confidant	Lei Lin-ying
2012 (16th)	Kenneth Ma	The Hippocratic Crush	Dr. Cheung Yat-kin
2012 (16th)	Moses Chan	The Last Steep Ascent	Miu Tin
2012 (16th)	Raymond Lam	Highs and Lows	Senior Inspector Wai Sai-lok (Happy Sir)
2012 (16th)	Damian Lau	Silver Spoon, Sterling Shackles	Sir Arthur Chung
2013 (17th)	Dayo Wong †	Bounty Lady	Heung Kwong-nam
2013 (17th)	Francis Ng	Triumph in the Skies II	Samuel "Sam" Tong
2013 (17th)	Julian Cheung	Triumph in the Skies II	Jayden "Captain Cool" Koo
2013 (17th)	Ruco Chan	Brother's Keeper	Sam Kiu Tin-seng
2013 (17th)	Kenneth Ma	The Hippocratic Crush II	Dr. Cheung Yat-kin
2014 (18th)	Roger Kwok †	Black Heart White Soul	Matt Ko
2014 (18th)	Ruco Chan	Ruse of Engagement	Carson Chong
2014 (18th)	Wong Cho-lam	Gilded Chopsticks	Ko Tin-po
2014 (18th)	Raymond Lam	Line Walker	Sit Ka-keung (Bao Seed)
2014 (18th)	Wayne Lai	Overachievers	Mike Chiang
2015 (19th)	Anthony Wong †	Lord of Shanghai	Kiu Ngo-tin
2015 (19th)	Moses Chan	Ghost of Relativity	Michael Mai
2015 (19th)	Louis Cheung	Momentary Lapse of Reason	Kam Wah
2015 (19th)	Ruco Chan	Captain of Destiny	Man-ho, the Eleventh Prince
2015 (19th)	Wayne Lai	Lord of Shanghai	Kung Siu-san
2016 (20th)	Ruco Chan †	A Fist Within Four Walls	Chor Au-kuen / Chiu Mang-san
2016 (20th)	Vincent Wong	Over Run Over	Kwan Ding-ming
2016 (20th)	Benjamin Yuen	A Fist Within Four Walls	Duen Ying-fung / Duen Tung-tin
2016 (20th)	Bosco Wong	Two Steps from Heaven	Sheldon Chun Sing-hoi
2016 (20th)	Roger Kwok	Dead Wrong	Vincent Wai Yat-sing
2017 (21st)	Vincent Wong †	Legal Mavericks	Hope Man
2017 (21st)	Ruco Chan	The Unholy Alliance	Ko Tsz-kit
2017 (21st)	Michael Miu	Line Walker: The Prelude	Senior Inspector Cheuk Hoi
2017 (21st)	Kenneth Ma	The Exorcist's Meter	Ma Kwai
2017 (21st)	Moses Chan	My Ages Apart	Mike Kwong
2018 (22nd)	Joe Ma †	Life on the Line	Mak Chay Tin
2018 (22nd)	Kenneth Ma	Deep in the Realm of Conscience	Yam Sam-shu
2018 (22nd)	Benjamin Yuen	Another Era	Fong Chak Yu
2018 (22nd)	Vincent Wong	Fist Fight	Cheung Fei Fan
2018 (22nd)	Dicky Cheung	The Learning Curve of a Warlord	Dik Kei
2019 (23rd)	Kenneth Ma †	Big White Duel	Tong Ming
2019 (23rd)	Benjamin Yuen	The Defected	Sheung Sing
2019 (23rd)	Joel Chan	Barrack O'Karma	Siu Wai-ming
2019 (23rd)	Vincent Wong	The Man Who Kills Troubles	Ngo Hei-san
2019 (23rd)	Pakho Chau	Wonder Women	Wing Ho-tin

=== 2020s ===
Year	Actor	Drama	Role(s)
2020 (24th)	Vincent Wong †	Legal Mavericks 2020	Hope Man San Hap
2020 (24th)	Moses Chan	Death By Zero	Kiu Sing / "Zero"
2020 (24th)	Wayne Lai	Death By Zero	Jim Mou / "Victor"
2020 (24th)	Raymond Lam	Line Walker: Bull Fight	Sit Ka Keung / Sit Sir / Bao Seed
2020 (24th)	Kenneth Ma	Line Walker: Bull Fight	Ngai Dak Lai / "Samuel" / Wai Chok Ming
2021 (25th)	Shaun Tam †	Take Two	Sze Kwong / Timothee
2021 (25th)	Ruco Chan	Sinister Beings	Hui Chun-Sum
2021 (25th)	Kevin Cheng	Kids' Lives Matter	Johnathan Hui Gam-Fung
2021 (25th)	Kenneth Ma	Kids' Lives Matter	Amos Fong Chung-Yan
2021 (25th)	Owen Cheung	The Ringmaster	Hoi Cheng Lam
2022 (26th)	Joel Chan †	Barrack O'Karma 1968	Maurice / Psychiatric Patient / Joey Chow Yi / Architect
2022 (26th)	Kenneth Ma	Big White Duel 2	Tong Ming
2022 (26th)	Ruco Chan	I've Got the Power	Chung Hao Lin
2022 (26th)	Andrew Lam Man-chung	Get On A Flat	Che Chi Ming
2022 (26th)	Kalok Chow	Your Highness	Gei Wai

== Records ==
Most wins

Wins	Actor
3	Gallen Lo
3	Wayne Lai
3	Roger Kwok
2	Louis Koo
2	Kevin Cheng
2	Vincent Wong
2	Moses Chan

Most top 5 nominations

Nominations	Actor
12	Kenneth Ma
11	Moses Chan
8	Bobby Au-yeung
7	Raymond Lam
6	Gallen Lo
6	Roger Kwok
6	Wayne Lai

Age superlatives

Record	Actor	TV drama	Age (in years)
Oldest winner	Ha Yu	Moonlight Resonance	62
Oldest top 5 nominee	Chung King-Fai	My Family	68
Youngest winner	Louis Koo	Detective Investigation Files IV	29
Youngest top 5 nominee	Raymond Lam	Eternal Happiness	23
