= Perfect World Pictures =

Chinese entertainment company

- Native name: 北京完美影视传媒
- Traded as: SZSE: 002624
- Industry: Entertainment
- Founded: 2008
- Headquarters: Beijing, China; Los Angeles, California, United States
- Key people: Rong Chen (President, US); Michael Lee (CFO, US)
- Parent: Perfect World
- Website: www.pwpic.com

Perfect World Pictures (PWPIC) is a Chinese entertainment company. Founded in 2008, it engages in the production, distribution and marketing of film and television content, content related advertising, merchandising business, and talent management business, as well as investment.

In late 2015, Perfect World commenced a long term co-financing deal with Universal Pictures, which represents the first time a Chinese company has directly invested in a multi-year slate deal with a major American studio.

PWPIC trades on the Shenzhen Stock Exchange in China under Ticker 002624.

== Chinese series produced ==
- List is incomplete. Only includes shows which has its own page in Wikipedia.

| Year | Title |
|---|---|
| 2010 | Marriage Battle (婚姻保卫战) |
| 2011 | Men (男人帮) |
| 2011 | The Glamorous Imperial Concubine (倾世皇妃) |
| 2012 | Beijing Youth (北京青年) |
| 2012 | Hot Girl (麻辣女兵) |
| 2012 | King's War (楚汉传奇) |
| 2013 | To Elderly With Love (老有所依) |
| 2013 | We Get Married (咱们结婚吧) |
| 2013 | Legend of Lu Zhen (陆贞传奇) |
| 2013 | Little Daddy (小爸爸) |
| 2014 | The Young Doctor (青年医生) |
| 2014 | Super Partner (神犬奇兵) |
| 2014 | The Ferry Man (灵魂摆渡) |
| 2015 | Hero Dog (神犬小七) |
| 2015 | Ice and Fire of Youth (冰与火的青春) |
| 2015 | The Ferry Man Season 2 (灵魂摆渡2) |
| 2016 | Hero Dog Season 2 (神犬小七2) |
| 2016 | Hot Girl (麻辣变形计) |
| 2016 | The Ferry Man Season 3 (灵魂摆渡3) |
| 2016 | Let's Fall In Love (咱们相爱吧) |
| 2017 | The Legend of the Condor Heroes (射雕英雄传) |
| 2017 | Song of Phoenix (思美人) |
| 2017 | Deepwater Forces (深海利剑) |
| 2017 | My! PE Teacher (我的！体育老师) |
| 2018 | The Flame's Daughter (烈火如歌) |
| 2018 | Accidental Firing (走火) |
| 2018 | Suddenly This Summer (忽而今夏) |
| 2018 | The Way We Were (归去来) |
| 2018 | Hero's Dream (天意) |
| 2018 | Perfect Youth (最美的青春) |
| 2018 | Heavy Sweetness, Ash-like Frost (香蜜沉沉烬如霜) |
| 2018 | Mother's Life (娘道) |
| 2019 | I Will Never Let You Go (小女花不弃) |
| 2019 | Youth Fight (青春斗) |
| 2019 | In Youth (趁我们还年轻) |
| 2019 | Hero Dog Season 3 (神犬小七3) |
| 2019 | Another Me (七月与安生) |
| 2019 | Love Under The Moon (山月不知心底事) |
| 2019 | The Legendary Tavern (老酒馆) |
| 2019 | Homeland (河山) |

== Chinese films produced ==
| Year | Title |
|---|---|
| 2009 | Sophie's Revenge (非常完美) |
| 2011 | The Piano in a Factory (钢的琴) |
| 2011 | Love Is Not Blind (失恋33天) |
| 2013 | Up in the Wind (等风来) |
| 2015 | Let's Get Married (咱们结婚吧) |
| 2017 | Extraordinary Mission (非凡任务) |
| 2017 | Angels Wear White (嘉年华) |
| 2018 | Shadow (影) |
| 2019 | A City Called Macau (妈阁是座城) |
| 2019 | The Whistleblower (吹哨人) |
| 2020 | Crocodile Island (巨鱷島) |

== Films co-financed with Universal Pictures/Focus Features ==
| Year | Title | Co-financed with | Note |
|---|---|---|---|
| 2016 | Ride Along 2 | with Will Packer Productions and Cube Vision | First film with Universal |
| 2016 | Hail Caesar! | with Working Title Films | |
| 2016 | The Boss | with Gary Sanchez Productions | |
| 2016 | The Huntsman: Winter's War | with Roth Films | |
| 2016 | Neighbors 2: Sorority Rising | with Point Grey Pictures and Good Universe | |
| 2016 | Popstar: Never Stop Never Stopping | with Apatow Productions and The Lonely Island | |
| 2016 | Central Intelligence | with Warner Bros. Pictures, New Line Cinema, RatPac Entertainment, Bluegrass Films, and Principato-Young Entertainment | |
| 2016 | Jason Bourne | with the Kennedy/Marshall Company, Captivate Entertainment, and Pearl Street Films | |
| 2016 | Bridget Jones's Baby | with Miramax, StudioCanal and Working Title Films | |
| 2016 | Almost Christmas | with Will Packer Productions | |
| 2016 | Nocturnal Animals | with Fade to Black | First film with Focus Features |
| 2017 | Fifty Shades Darker | with Michael De Luca Productions | |
| 2017 | The Mummy | with K/O Paper Products, Secret Hideout, Conspiracy Factory and Sean Daniel Company | |
| 2017 | Girls Trip | with Will Packer Productions | |
| 2017 | Victoria & Abdul | with BBC Films, Working Title Films and Cross Street Films | |
| 2017 | The Snowman | with Another Park Film and Working Title Films | |
| 2017 | Darkest Hour | with Working Title Films and Death of Caylee Anthony | |
| 2017 | Phantom Thread | with Annapurna Pictures, and Ghoulardi Film Company | |
| 2017 | Pitch Perfect 3 | with Gold Circle Entertainment and Brownstone Productions | |
| 2018 | Fifty Shades Freed | with Michael De Luca Productions | |
| 2018 | Jurassic World: Fallen Kingdom | with The Kennedy/Marshall Company, Legendary Pictures and Amblin Entertainment | |
| 2018 | The First Purge | with Blumhouse Productions and Platinum Dunes | |
| 2018 | Mamma Mia! Here We Go Again | with Legendary Pictures, Playtone and Littlestar Entertainment | |
| 2018 | BlacKkKlansman | with Legendary Pictures, Blumhouse Productions, QC Entertainment, Monkeypaw Productions, 40 Acres and a Mule Filmworks | |
| 2018 | Johnny English Strikes Again | with StudioCanal and Working Title Films | |
| 2018 | Night School | with Hartbeat and Will Packer Productions | |
| 2018 | First Man | with DreamWorks Pictures and Temple Hill Entertainment | |
| 2018 | Boy Erased | with Anonymous Content and Blue-Tongue Films | |
| 2018 | Mary Queen of Scots | with Working Title Films | |
| 2018 | Mortal Engines | with Media Rights Capital | |
| 2018 | Welcome to Marwen | with DreamWorks Pictures and ImageMovers | |
| 2019 | Glass | with Blumhouse Productions, Blinding Edge Pictures and Buena Vista International | |
| 2019 | Us | with Monkeypaw Productions | |
| 2019 | Little | with Legendary Pictures and Will Packer Productions | |
| 2019 | Yesterday | with Working Title Films | |
| 2019 | Good Boys | with Good Universe and Point Grey | |
| 2019 | Downton Abbey | with Carnival Films | |
| 2019 | Harriet | with New Balloon and Stay Gold Pictures | |
| 2019 | Last Christmas | with Feigco Entertainment and Calamity Films | |
| 2019 | Cats | with Working Title Films and Amblin Entertainment | |
| 2020 | Dolittle | with Team Downey | |
| 2020 | The Photograph | with Will Packer Productions | |
| 2020 | Emma. | with Working Title Films and Blueprint Pictures | |
| 2020 | The Hunt | with Blumhouse Productions and White Rabbit Productions | |
| 2020 | The High Note | with Working Title Films | |
| 2020 | The King of Staten Island | with Apatow Productions | |
| 2020 | News of the World | with Playtone and Pretty Pictures | |
| 2021 | Nobody | with Eighty Two Films, 87North Productions, and Odenkirk Provissiero Entertainment | |
| 2021 | The Forever Purge | with Blumhouse Productions, Platinum Dunes, and Man in a Tree Productions | |
| 2021 | Old | with Blinding Edge Pictures | |
| 2021 | Dear Evan Hansen | with Marc Platt Productions | |
| 2021 | Last Night in Soho | with Film4, Working Title Films and Complete Fiction Pictures | |
| 2022 | Marry Me | with Nuyorican Productions | |
| 2022 | The Northman | with Regency Enterprises | Last film with Focus Features |
| 2022 | Jurassic World Dominion | with Amblin Entertainment | Last film with Universal |

== Non Universal-Focus films ==
| Year | Title | Co-financed with | Note |
|---|---|---|---|
| 2019 | Charlie's Angels | with Columbia Pictures, 2.0 Entertainment, Cantillon Company and Brownstone Productions | Perfect World's first and only Non Universal-Focus film |

== See also ==
- Universal Studios
- Legendary Entertainment
- Working Title Films
- Blumhouse Productions
- Will Packer Productions
- RatPac Entertainment
- Miramax
- Columbia Pictures
- Sony Pictures Animation
- Intrepid Pictures
- China Film Group
