= Gallen Lo =

Hong Kong actor and singer

Gallen Lo 羅嘉良
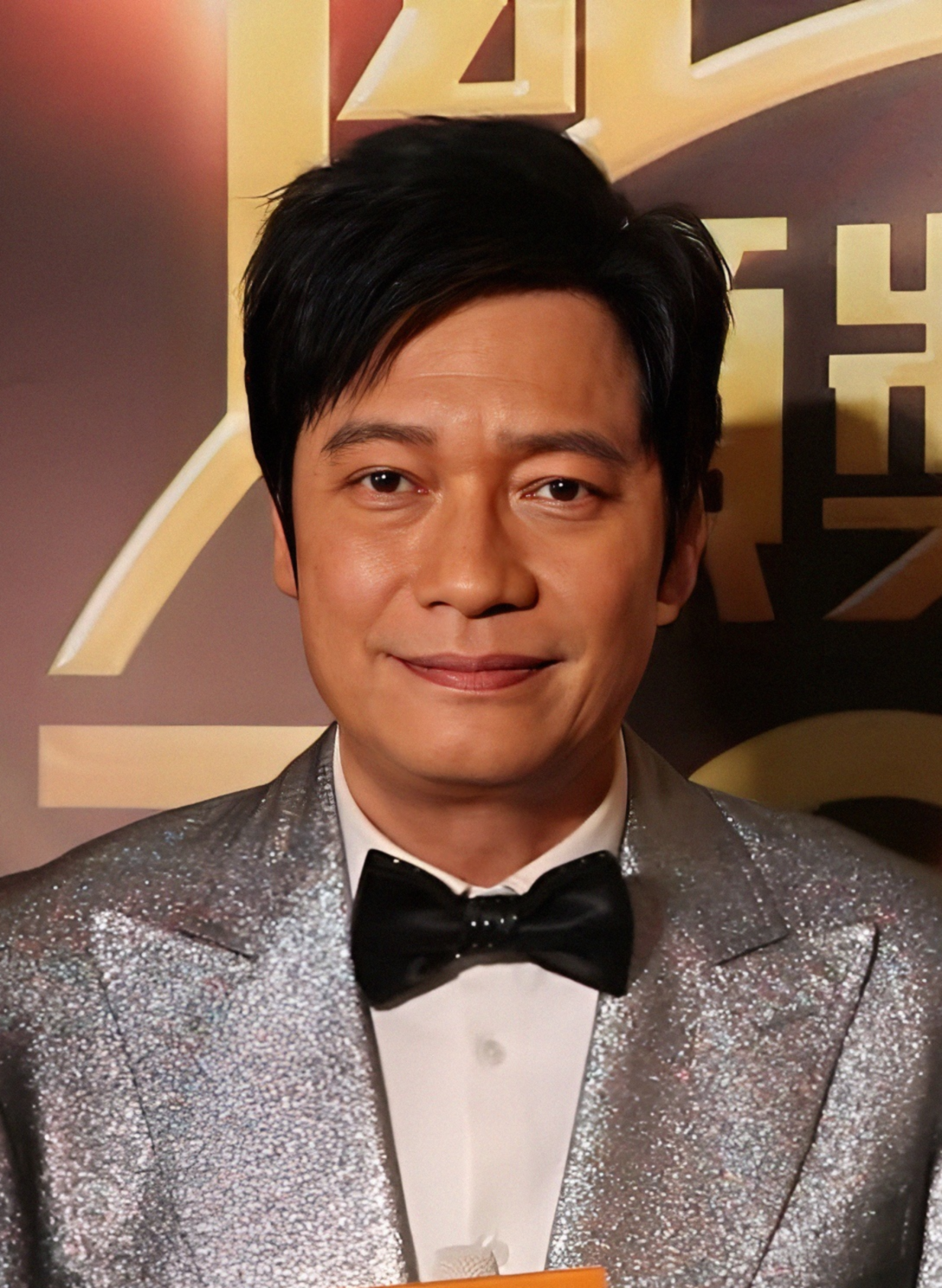
- Lo interviewed by mass media with Bowie Lam after "TVB Awards Presentation 2023"
- Born: Lo Ho-leung (羅浩良); 16 December 1962 (age 63); Hong Kong
- Other name: Lo Ka (撈家)
- Occupations: Actor; singer
- Years active: 1983–present
- Spouse(s): Clare Fong Man-yee (1998–2008); Sophie Su Yan (2009–)
- Children: 2
- Awards: TVB Anniversary Awards – Best Actor; 1997 Old Time Buddy; 1998 Secret of the Heart; 2002 Golden Faith; My Favourite On-Screen Partners (Dramas); 1999 Mr. Diana; My Favourite Television Character; 2000 At the Threshold of an Era; 2001 Seven Sisters; 2002 Golden Faith

Chinese name
- Traditional Chinese: 羅嘉良
- Simplified Chinese: 罗嘉良
Transcriptions
Standard Mandarin
- Hanyu Pinyin: Luó Jiāliáng
Yue: Cantonese
- Jyutping: Lo4 Gaa1leong4

Gallen Lo Ka-leung (Chinese: 羅嘉良) is a Hong Kong actor and singer who primarily acts in television series. He is sometimes credited as King Gallen or Law Ka-leung.

== Career ==
Lo started his television career in 1984 at ATV. He received short-term success in acting ATV and singing theme songs for some ATV series. Lo left ATV for rival TVB, but his career did not bloom until 1996, when he was cast in the series Old Time Buddy in 1997 and Secret of the Heart in 1998. Lo won TVB's Best Actor Award three times (1997, 1998, 2002).

In 2003, Lo left TVB and started to focusing on acting and making commercials in Mainland China.

On 24 February 2021, Lo has finished another drama shooting in Mainland China and shared on his Weibo commemorating the completion of his 100th TV series in his career.

== Personal life ==
Lo married Clare Fong Man-yee, a woman with whom he worked in a non-acting role at TVB, in 1998. Their son was born in 1999. The couple divorced in 2008.

On 30 January 2009, he was engaged to mainland actress (Sophie) Su Yan in Beijing, and had registered his marriage with Su Yan on 9 September 2009. Their daughter was born in 2013.

== Filmography ==
=== Film ===
Year	Title	Role	Notes
1987	Evil Cat		
1987	Love Beyond Reach		Telemovie
1987	Below the Lion Rock: Eye Twitch	Flower Customer	Short Film The Seasons
1989	Be My Son	Ho Ka-leung	Telemovie
1990	Beyond the Step	Lai	Telemovie
1991	Fatal Mission		
1992	The Thief of Time	Government official	
1993	A Warrior's Tragedy	Mou Yung	
1994	The Knight and the Concubine	Lee Jyun-mou	Telemovie
1994	Out on a Limb	Lau Wing-tai	Telemovie
1997	Those Were the Days	Lei Kei	
1999	Gigolo of Chinese Hollywood	Steven Chow	
1999	Afraid of Nothing, the Jobless King	Ha Kong	
2001	Vampire Controller	John Lui	
2005	Divergence	Yiu Tin-chung	
2012	The Travel of Memory	Kai	Microfilm
2016	MBA Partners	Zou Zhi-yun	
2017	The Chinese Widow	Captain Xu	
2020	Crocodile Island	Lin Hao	Web film
2023	The White Storm 3: Heaven or Hell		

=== Television ===
Year	Title	Role	TVB Anniversary Awards	Notes
1986	City Stories	Lo Wai-man (Johnson)		
1987	The Seasons	Tong Ka-lai		
1988	Behind Silk Curtains	Dr. Wong		
1988	The Final Verdict	Luk Ka-ming (Thomas)		
1989	Looking Back in Anger	Wong Kwok-kei		
1989	The Legend of Master Chan	Magistrate Yung Man-cheung		
1989	Mystery of the Parchment	Hoi Dou		
1989	A Trial of Lifetime	Yau Gim		
1989	Yankee Boy	Tsui Yau-fu		
1989	Battle in the Royal Court	Shum Chi		
1990	The Self Within	Yung Lut-sau		
1990	Silken Hands	Hui Jun-tak		
1990	The Hunter's Prey	Fung Yek-lok		
1990	Rain in the Heart	Chung Man-kit		
1991	Be My Guest	Chow Man-ching		(Guest Star - Episode 126)
1991	Live for Life	Lam Chi-chung		
1991	Police on the Road	Chan Chi-sun		
1991	The Survivor	Cheuk Ka-ming		
1992	Bet on Fate	To Ka-cheung		
1992	Vengeance	Kiu Lik		
1992	Rage and Passion	Yuen-ngan Fung		
1992	Tales from Beyond	Cheung Ka-wai		(Episode 8)
1993	The Hero from Shanghai	Hong Kiu		
1993	Golden Snake Sword	Ha Suet-yee (Xia Xueyi)		(Guest Star)
1993	The Yang's Women Warriors	Lei See-kei		
1993	The Art of Being Together			
1993	The Spirit of Love			
1993	A Chinese Ghost Story	Prince of the Devil		(Story: Fire Demon) (Special Guest Star) (Taiwanese Production)
1994	The Last Conquest	Cheng-tak Emperor		
1994	The Legend of Condor Heroes 1994	Yeung Hong		
1995	Self-Denial	Chiu Mou		(Story: The Orphan of Chiu) (Episodes 14-20)
1995	Plain Love	Fong Shu-gan		
1995	Hand of Hope	Ching Lap-yan		
1996	Dark Tales	Wong Yuen Fung; Wong Ding		(Episodes 16-20) (Episodes 26-35)
1996	Cold Blood Warm Heart	Tsui Ka-lap		
1996	The Criminal Investigator II	SP Charles Leung Ka-wai		
1996	Ambition	Cheung Man-wai		
1997	Once Upon a Time in Shanghai	Kwok Say-wai		
1997	Old Time Buddy	Lei Kei	Won – Best Actor	
1997	Mystery Files	Peter Ko Wing-yin		
1997	A Recipe for the Heart	Lee Kei / Sui-hau-lo (Plumber)		(Guest Star - Episode 13)
1998	Old Time Buddy - To Catch a Thief	Lee Kei		
1998	Secret of the Heart	Cheuk Sheung-man	Won – Best Actor	
1999	Feminine Masculinity	Tang Ping-kuen	Won – My Favourite On-Screen Partners; Nominated – Best Actor	
1999	At the Threshold of an Era	Tim Yip Wing-tim	Nominated – Best Actor	
2000	At the Threshold of an Era II	Tim Yip Wing-tim	Won – My Favourite Television Character	
2001	At Point Blank	Law King-fai		(released overseas 2001) (aired in 2006 HK TVB)
2001	Seven Sisters	Tse Tsi-tong	Nominated – Best Actor; Won – My Favourite Television Character	
2001	Hope for Sale	Wong Ha-pak		
2002	King of Kings	Guan Tian Tao		(Mainland Chinese Production)
2002	Where Is My Love	Luo Da Wei (David)		(Mainland Chinese Production)
2002	Golden Faith	Ivan Ting Sin-bun / Chung Tin-yan	Won – Best Actor; Won – My Favourite Television Character	
2003	The 'W' Files	Wisely		
2003	Two Days of Love	Tan Yi Lun		(Mainland Chinese Production)
2003	Eternity: A Chinese Ghost Story	Mo Jun Liu Dao (Six Demon Lord)		(Guest Star)(Taiwanese Production)
2004	Kung Fu Soccer	Grad Cheung Gin		(Guest Star)
2005	My Fair Lady	King Xuan of Qi		
2005	Magic Chef	Cheng Chung		
2005	Fugitive (End of the World Pursuit)	Cheng Ren		(Mainland Chinese Production)
2006	Lady Wang in Exile	Hū Hán Xié Chán Yú		
2006	Permutation	Hong Cheng Li		
2007	Chinese Moon on Hu's Land	Li Biao		
2007	Wolf Smoke	Gao Da		
2008	When a Dog Loves a Cat	Miu Jun		
2008	Perfect Ending	Zhou Zhenhua		(Mainland Chinese production)
2009	Zheng He's Voyages	Zheng He		(Mainland Chinese Production)
2009	Born Rich	Sa Fu-loi / Cheuk Yat-ming	Nominated – Best Actor (Top 15); Nominated – My Favourite Male Character (Top 15)	
2009	Invisible Target	Zhou Jing Zhi		(Mainland Chinese Production)
2010	Golden Mile	Lu Yuan Hang		(Mainland Chinese Production)
2010	Ice Is Sleeping Water	Dr. Jin		(Guest Star) (Mainland Chinese Production)
2011	Ancient Terracotta War Situation	Qin Shi Huang / Bai Yun Fei		
2011	Song of Spring and Autumn	Chong'er (Duke Wen of Jin)		
2011	The Legend of Incorruptible Stone	Sun Quan		
2011	Confucius	Zi Gong		(Mainland Chinese Production)
2012	Crossing the Border	Chen Kai		(Mainland Chinese Production)
2013	The Patriot Yue Fei	Qin Hui		(Mainland Chinese production)
2013	Women's Weapon	Yang Xin Jun		(Mainland Chinese Production)
2014	Youth Is Not Enough	Zhao Kuang Yin / Crius		(Special Guest Star) (Mainland Chinese Production)
2015	My Three Fathers	Ning Bao Lin		(Mainland Chinese Production)
2015	Love Jewelry	Gong Hong Da		(Mainland Chinese Production)
2016	The Chaser	Li Ru Bin		(Mainland Chinese Production)
2016	Eastern Battlefied	Wang Jing Wei		(Mainland Chinese Production)
2016	Le Sacrifice	Song Qing He		(Mainland Chinese Production)
2017	Provocateur	Cheuk Kwan-lam (King)		
2017	Gone with the Red Dust	Military Chief Du Cheng Kai		(Mainland Chinese Production)
2017	Song of Phoenix	King Huiwen of Qin		(Mainland Chinese production)
2018	Infernal Affairs	Han Lang		
2018	The Dark Lord	Yang Ying Long		(Mainland Chinese Production)
2019	Goodbye My Princess	The emperor		(Mainland Chinese production)
2019	Destiny's Love	Wen Fu		(Guest Star) (Mainland Chinese Production)
2020	Handsome Siblings	Jiang Bie He		(Netflix)
2020	Citizens of Wan Qu	Ou Yang Dong Jiang		(Mainland Chinese Production)
2020	White War	Chan Gin		(Special Guest Star)
2021	Heroes	Prime Minister Cai Xiang		(Mainland Chinese Production)
2024	The Heir to the Throne	Yau Sau-yee		

== Awards and titles ==
- TVB Anniversary Awards 1997 Best Actor ~ Old Time Buddy
- TVB Anniversary Awards 1998 My Favourite Actor in a Leading Role ~ Secrets of the Heart
- TVB Anniversary Awards 1999 My Favourite On-Screen Partners ( Dramas ) ~ Feminine Masculinity ( with Flora Chan )
- TVB Anniversary Awards 2000 My Top 10 Favourite Television Characters ~ At the Threshold of an Era 2
- TVB Anniversary Awards 2001 My Top 13 Favourite Television Characters ~ Seven Sisters
- TVB Anniversary Awards 2002 My Favourite Actor in a Leading Role ~ Golden Faith
- TVB Anniversary Awards 2002 My Top 12 Favourite Television Characters ~ Golden Faith
- Fung-Wan III - The 3rd Top Chinese TV Drama Award 2007 Most Favourite Hong Kong/Taiwan Actor

== Discography ==
- At Point Blank (我有时怕倾诉)
- At The Threshold of An Era 1 (創世紀)
- At The Threshold of An Era 2 (創世紀 II)
- Seven Sisters (七姊妹)
- Secret of the Heart (天地豪情)
- Time's Fairytale (歲月的童話), opening theme song for Golden Faith
- Sunny Days (陽光燦爛的日子) and When Love Comes to an End (當愛情走到盡頭), ending theme songs for Golden Faith and The W Files
- On the Verge of Eternity (差一剎的地老天荒), opening theme song for Born Rich

Awards and achievements
TVB Anniversary Awards
Preceded by N/A	Best Actor; 1997 for Old Time Buddy	Succeeded by Gallen Lo for Secret of the Heart
Preceded by Louis Koo for A Step into the Past	Best Actor; 2002 for Golden Faith	Succeeded by Roger Kwok for Square Pegs
