= Suet Nei =

Hong Kong actress (1947–2025)

- 雪妮
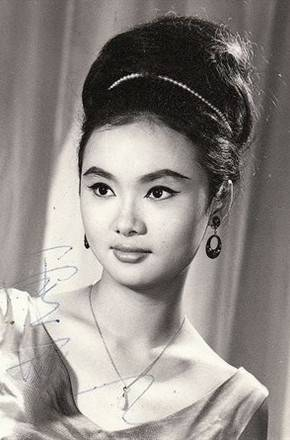
- Nei in 1960s
- Born: Li Chao-chun; 1947; Hubei, Republic of China
- Died: 3 July 2025 (aged 77–78)
- Other names: Hung Suet-nei, Hsung Shuet-Ni, Suet Nay, Hsiung Hsueh-Ni
- Education: Tack Ching Girls' Secondary School
- Occupation: Actress
- Years active: 1962–2020
- Spouse: Tong Kai (1969–2025)

Hung Suet-nei (Chinese: 熊雪妮; 1947 – 3 July 2025), known as Suet Nei or Suet Nay (雪妮), real name Li Chao-chun (李超純), was a Hong Kong actress. She acted for many years in Cantonese martial operas, owing to her skills in martial arts. Nei signed with TVB in 1997.

== Personal life, illness and death ==
Nei was born in Hubei, China in 1947.

Nei married the actor Tong Kai in 1969 and the couple subsequently relocated to Canada. They returned to Hong Kong in the 1990s.

Kai died on 23 June 2025, aged 88, after falling from a building. Nei died from pancreatic cancer ten days later, on 3 July 2025.

== Filmography ==
=== Television ===
Year	Name of Drama	Role
1998	Old Time Buddy: To Catch a Thief	Ching Seung Seung (程雙雙)
1998	Secret of the Heart	Koo Yuk Mei (顧玉媚)
1999	Happy Ever After	Empress Xiaoshengxian (孝圣宪皇后)
1999	At the Threshold of an Era	Yip Li Bi Zun (葉李碧珍)
1999	Detective Investigation Files IV	Tang Fang (鄧芳)
2000	At the Threshold of an Era II	Yip Li Bi Zun (葉李碧珍)
2001	A Taste of Love	Ha Song Guk (夏桑菊)
2001	Country Spirit	Lau Yuk Fung (劉玉鳳)
2002	Invisible Journey	Yuk Bo Jan (王寶珍)
2002	The Trust of a Life Time	Lam Fung Ping(林鳳萍)
2003	In The Realm Of Fancy	Ching Dai Leung (程大娘)
2003	The 'W' Files	Aunt Ho (何媽)
2004	Lady Fan	Lei San Sing Mo (梨山聖母)
2004	To Catch The Uncatchable	Betty (劉並蒂)
2004	The Last Breakthrough	Cheung Sau Yu (張秀瑜)
2005	Fantasy Hotel	Wong Siu Diep (王小蝶)
2005	Wars of In-laws	(Ling Lo Wai Qing)( 甯羅慧卿)
2005	Women on the Run	Kam Lo-Tai 金老太
2006	Greed Mask	Ching Yuen Mei (程婉媚)
2006	Lethal Weapons of Love and Passion	Master Yeen (言靜庵)
2006	Safe Guards	Tseng Sau Ping 鄭秀萍
2006	CIB Files	Ngo (娥)
2007	Men Don't Cry	Chin Ngoi Fa (錢愛花)
2007	Face to Fate	Man Li Fong (閔李芳)
2008	Phoenix Rising	Tsui Wah (徐娃)
2008	Au Revoir Shanghai	Kam Yim Hong (金艷紅)
2008	Best Selling Secrets	Man Tsz Qing (文子卿)
2008	D.I.E.	Cheung Muk Lan (張沐蘭)
2008	The Silver Chamber of Sorrows	Ko Tai Kwan (高太君)
2008	The Money-Maker Recipe	Cheung Bao Lai Hing (蔣鮑麗卿)
2008	The Four	Mama Yeung (羊大媽)
2009	The King of Snooker	Ning Mung Tim (寧夢甜)
2009	Rosy Business	Gwai Yuk Yu (季玉如)
2009	You're Hired	Ha Ching Ching (夏青青)
2009	The Threshold of a Persona	Wong Gwai Ho (黃桂好)
2009	D.I.E. Again	Cheung Muk Lan(張沐蘭)
2009	ICAC Investigators 2009	Grandmother Chung 鍾婆婆
2010	My Better Half	Nam Bat Hang 藍畢珩
2010	Some Day	Shek Ko Yim Yung (石高豔容)
2010	Beauty Knows No Pain	Wong Wai Qing(王蕙卿)
2010	A Pillow Case of Mystery II	Wong Sheung (黃嫦)
2010	Twilight Investigation	Cheung Lai Fong(張麗芳)
2011	A Great Way to Care	Cheung Yim Fong(章艷芳)
2011	Only You	Cheung Suet Ha(張雪霞)
2011	Relic of an Emissary	Grandmother Kam (金婆婆)
2011	River of Wine	Sung Tsz Kam (宋芷琴)
2011	Til Love Do Us Lie	(羅少紅)
2012	Queens of Diamonds and Hearts	Chu Shi (朱氏) (Ngan Ying's grandmother)
2012	No Good Either Way	
2012	The Last Steep Ascent	Tsui Siu-mui (徐小妹)
2013	Sniper Standoff	Law Oi-yau (羅愛友)
2014	Return of the Silver Tongue	Pau Heung
2014	Gilded Chopsticks	palace lady
2015	Raising the Bar	(雪妮)
2015	Eye in the Sky	Grandma Mui (梅婆)
2015	Smooth Talker	Chung Yan-giu (鍾欣嬌)
2015	Every Step You Take	Leung Giu (梁嬌)
2016	Short End of the Stick	Kam Suk(金淑)
2016	House of Spirits	Kam Siu Mo-ching (甘瀟慕晶)
2017	Tofu War	Hung Lai Koon (洪麗娟)
2022	Story of Zom-B	Pak Ma San-kan
