= The Criminal Investigator II =

- VCD cover
- Genre: Police procedural Crime drama Action
- Created by: Jonathan Chik
- Screenplay by: Chow Yuk-ming; Tai Tak-kwong; Ku Yee-lai; Fong Sai-keung; Tsang Po-wah; Cheung Siu-fong
- Directed by: Jonathan Chik; Mak Koon-chi; Joe Chan; Tong Fung-chun; Cheng Kei-sing; Chung Kwok-keung
- Starring: Felix Wong; Gallen Lo; Sunny Chan
- Theme music composer: Lee Shih Shiong
- Opening theme: "真相" (lit. Truth) performed by Jacky Cheung
- Ending theme: "怎麼說" (lit. How to Say It) performed by Bondy Chiu
- Country of origin: Hong Kong
- Original language: Cantonese
- No. of episodes: 30

Production
- Producer: Jonathan Chik
- Production location: Hong Kong
- Camera setup: Multi camera
- Running time: 42 minutes (each)
- Production company: TVB

Original release
- Network: TVB Jade
- Release: 28 October – 6 December 1996

Related
- The Criminal Investigator

The Criminal Investigator II (Traditional Chinese: O記實錄II; lit. The O Files II) is a 1996 Hong Kong police procedural television drama. Produced by Jonathan Chik with a screenplay edited by Chow Yuk-ming and Chiu Ching-yung, the drama is a TVB production and the direct sequel to 1995's The Criminal Investigator. The story follows a team of investigators from the Organized Crime and Triad Bureau (OCTB) unit of the Royal Hong Kong Police Force.

== Characters ==
=== OCTB unit ===
==== Team A ====
Rank	Role	Cast
Chief Superintendent	Ho Tsan-yeung (何鎮洋)	Wong Wai
Superintendent	Charles Leung Ka-wai (梁家偉)	Gallen Lo
Senior Inspector	Wong Chi-chung (王志淙)	Felix Wong
Sergeant	Lam Wing-tai (林永泰)	Sunny Chan
Senior Police Constable	Chu Yat-lung (朱日隆)	Yu Tin-wai
Senior Police Constable	Szeto Man-on (司徒文安)	Joe Ma
Police Constable	Wu Sau-fat (胡守法)	Shum Po-sze
Police Constable	Yeung Yat-san (楊日辰)	Dai Yiu-ming
District Attorney of Department of Justice	Rita Yu Ching-wan (余靖允)	Yvonne Lam

=== CIB unit ===
Rank	Role	Cast
Superintendent	Jeff Chan Kwai (陳桂)	Choi Kwok-kuen
Police Constable	Ng Lap-kwong (伍立光)	Willie Wai
Police Constable	Toby Fong Siu-man (方小敏)	Josie Ho
Police Constable	Ah Chi (阿志)	Sammy Lau

=== Other characters ===
- Gigi Lai as Tammy Fong Siu-fong (方小芳)
- Bondy Chiu as Bonnie Wong Ming-wai (王明慧)
- Mariane Chan as Louisa Chan Sin-mei (陳善美)
- Choi Kwok-hing as Lam Sam (林森)
- Benz Hui as Fong Sai-yin (方世賢)
- Lau Siu-ming as Wong Hong-kwai (王康貴)
- Pak Yan as Lai Kit-yu (黎潔如)
- Gregory Rivers as Gary
