= Police on the Road =

Hong Kong television series

- Official poster
- 皇家鐵馬
- Genre: Police procedural Action
- Screenplay by: Choi Yip-ming; Yu Hon-wing; Choi Siu-ning; Cheng Yau-hing; Wong Yuk-chun
- Directed by: Luk Tin-wah; Choi Fat-lun; Patrick Yau; Chan Suk-leung
- Starring: Gallen Lo; Wan Yeung-ming; John Wu; Lau Sau-ping; Sing Yan; Patrick Hon
- Theme music composer: Choi Chung-ching
- Opening theme: Forgive Me (原諒我) by Gallen Lo
- Country of origin: Hong Kong
- Original language: Cantonese
- No. of episodes: 13

Production
- Producer: Siu Hin-fai
- Production location: Hong Kong
- Camera setup: Multi camera
- Production company: TVB

Original release
- Network: TVB Jade
- Release: 5 October 1991 – 1 February 1992

Police on the Road
- Traditional Chinese: 皇家鐵馬
- Simplified Chinese: 皇家铁马
- Literal meaning: "Royal Cavalry"
Transcriptions
Standard Mandarin
- Hanyu Pinyin: Huáng Jiā Tiě Mǎ
Yue: Cantonese
- Jyutping: Wong4 Gaa1 Tit3 Maa2

Police on the Road is a 1991 Hong Kong action police procedural television series produced by TVB and starring Gallen Lo and Wan Yeung-ming. With a total of 13 episodes, the series contains a different story in each of the episodes. Originally aired from 5 October 1991 to 1 February 1992 on TVB Jade, the show had a rerun on the channel, TVB Classic, from 4 to 12 June 2015 as a part of the special, Our... Gallen Lo (我們的...羅嘉良), that ran from 20 March to 12 June.

== Plot ==
Traffic officer Chan Chi-san (Gallen Lo) transfers to Inspector Lee (Liu Kai-chi) unit in order to work with his friend, Four Eyed Snake (Lo Mang). While investigating a speeding case where Chow Ying-kei (Patrick Hon) ran over and killed a civilian, Chi-san meets reporter Cheung Chi-wai (Lau Sau-ping), and the two fall in love. However, Chi-wai's older brother, Cheung Kam-fai (Lee Lung-kei), is a taxi driver with extreme hate for traffic cops and prevents the romance between the two.

Fellow traffic officer Ho Kwok-cheung (Wan Yeung-ming) has a righteous personality to order to infiltrate an illegal street racing group, he betrays his friend, Joe (Jimmy Wong). Kwok-cheung later meets Angel (Anita Lee), who is a mistress of a rich businessman, and instantly falls in love with her. However, Angel gets into a dilemma whether to choose Kwok-cheung or stay with the rich businessman.

== Episodes ==
| Ep # | Title |
|---|---|
| 1 | Glory of a Cavalry (鐵騎雄風) |
| 2 | Kiss from a Speed-racing Girl (飛車女之吻) |
| 3 | Road Fanatic (馬路狂徒) |
| 4 | Taxi Brother (的士大哥) |
| 5 | Cavalry Bride (鐵馬俏佳人) |
| 6 | Tanker Storm (運油風暴) |
| 7 | Po (阿寶) |
| 8 | Master Ting (頂爺) |
| 9 | The Dead Undercover (死亡邊緣人) |
| 10 | Brave Emotions of a Cavalry (鐵騎豪情) |
| 11 | Back to the Training Academy (回到學堂) |
| 12 | The Price of Glory (光榮何價) |
| 13 | Stern Law and Order (嚴正法紀) |

== Cast ==
=== Traffic Branch Headquarters ===
- Gallen Lo as Chan Chi-san (陳志新)
- Wan Yeung-ming as Ho Kwok-cheung (何國昌)
- Sing Yan as Chu Man-fai (朱文輝)
- Lo Mang as Four Eyed Snake (眼鏡蛇)
- John Wu as Wong Sai-leung (王世良)
- Chiu Hung as Officer Choi (蔡Sir)

=== Other ===
- Lau Sau-ping as Cheung Chi-wai (張紫蕙)
- Cheng Ka-sang as Cheung (阿祥)
- Tsui Kwong-lam as Uncle Ping (炳叔)
- Pok Kwan as Ming (阿明)
- Ngai Sin-lap as test examiner

=== Episode 1 ===
- Gabriel Wong as Brother Cho (初哥)
- Lee Wai-man as Car owner
- Sit Chun as Strange passenger
- Lui Chui-ping as Shanghai lady (上海婆)

=== Episode 2 ===
- Tsui Ka-po as Pinky
- Mak Chi-suet as Mad Keung (喪強)
- Andy Tai as Chan Lung-fu (陳龍虎)
- Wai Tak-sing as Bold Chuen (沙胆泉)
- Chan Siu-ping as Little Devil (小妖)
- Ngan Ching-wai as Gi Gi
- Chin Chau as Connie
- Fung Shui-chun as Pinky's mother
- Chan Yin-hong as Nurse
- Chan Chun-lok as Happy
- Yau Piu as Car racer
- Cheng Chun-fan as punk
- Choi Chi-fung as Keung's underling
- Yip Chi-wah as Keung's underling

=== Episode 3 ===
- Patrick Hon as Chow Ying-kei (周英奇)
- Gilbert Lam as Adviser Kau (師爺九)
- Yip Sai-kuen as Rocky
- Ceci So as Aunt Ming (明嬸)
- Teresa Ha as Aunt Ming's mother
- Wong Sau-kuen as Female colleague
- Wong Wai-fan as Female secretary
- Lui Kim-kwong as News stall owner
- Ho Pik-kin as Chief editor

=== Episode 4 ===
- Lee Lung-kei as Cheung Kam-fai (張錦輝)
- Wan Seung-yin as Female passenger
- Ying Sin-yin as Passerby
- Liu Pui-ling as Female driver
- Wong Fung-king as Pregnant woman
- Cheng Chun-fai as Waiter

=== Episode 5 ===
- Anita Lee as Angel
- Wong Chun-kit as Passenger
- Shek Yat-ming as Driver A
- Guo Cheuk-wah as Rascal A
- Wat Wai-lam as Rascal B
- Kwok Cho-yin as Driver B
- Leung Kin-ping as Ben
- Hung Ho-wan as Bodyguard A
- Chow Chin-yee as Bodyguard B
- Chan Yiu-man as Waiter
- Wong Mei-yee as Cori
- Tai Siu-man as Boyfriend
- Tam Suk-mui as Female staff
- So Chi as Guard

=== Episode 6 ===
- Wayne Lai as Man (阿文)
- Cho Chai as Old man Lau (劉伯)
- Wu Ying-man as Jacky
- Tam Yat-ching as Uncle Kwan (坤叔)

=== Episode 7 ===
- Wong Yat-fei as Uncle Kuen (權叔)
- Elton Loo as Po (阿寶)
- Fung Chi-fung as Thug
- Wong Chung-chi as Thug
- Suet Tai-wah as Thug
- Fong Kit as Police superintendent
- Au Yuk as Mini-bus driver

=== Episode 8 ===
- Cheng Lui as Uncle Tat (達叔)
- Kwan Chi-piu as Leung (阿良)
- Steve Lee as Master Ting (頂爺)
- Chan Wing-chun as Wing (阿榮)
- Kong Ming-fai as Wing's underling
- Lam To-kuen as Keung (阿強)
- Lee Wai-man as Man (阿民)
- Fong Kit as Chief Inspector

=== Episode 9 ===
- Gary Chan as Luk (阿祿)
- Chan Pui-san as May
- Lam Kin-fai as Tommy
- Wong Man-piu as Film director
- Fung Man-ching as Annie
- Cheung Chun-wah as Film star
- Chan Yiu-wah as Doctor

=== Episode 10 ===
- Lee Hin-ming as Crippled Chicken (廢雞)
- Dick Chan as Dr. Yiu (姚偉生)
- Jimmy Wong as Joe
- Wu Man-yam as Tina
- Ling Hon as Old man Tang (鄧伯)
- Cheng Wai-ka as Sandy
- Tsang Yiu-ming as Brother Ho (豪哥)
- Chan Yin-hong as Nurse
- Tam Suk-mui as Nurse

=== Episode 11 ===
- Cheng Siu-ping as Aunt King (琼姑)
- May Tse as Chu Man-fai's wife
- Shek Wan as Uncle Kuen (權叔)
- Yuen Lung-kui as Robber A
- Lau Wan as Robber B
- Chan Wai-yu as Aunty (阿嬸)
- Mak Ka-lun as Policeman A
- Wai Tak-sing as Policeman B
- Yung Ka-lai as Cashier

=== Episode 12 ===
- Siu Yan-san as Politician
- Liu Kai-chi as Inspector Lee (李Sir)
- Law Lan as Lee's mother
- Cheng Kwan-ning as Snake Ning (蛇仔明)
- Candy Man as Grace
- Fong Kit as Officer Yip (葉Sir)
- Wong Sze-yan as Driver
- Wan Lap-chun as Ben
- Law Hung as Officer Chiu (趙Sir)

=== Episode 13 ===
- Andrew Yuen as Mick (阿明)
- Hau Wai-wan as Carly
- Ho Pik-kin as Editor
- Tang Yu-chiu as 12th Young Master (十二少)
- Wong Wai-fan as Secretary
- Ku Sui-kwan as Underling
- Cheng Pak-wan as Underling
- Cheng Ka-chung as Underling
