= Golden Faith =

- Promo poster
- 流金歲月
- Genre: Drama; Financial thriller
- Written by: Lau Choi-wan; Sharon Au; Cheung Siu-fong; Wong Lei-chi
- Directed by: Man Wai-hung; Lai Kai-ming; Chung Kwok-keung
- Starring: Gallen Lo; Deric Wan; Jessica Hsuan; Raymond Lam; Michelle Ye; Shek Sau; Anne Heung; Gigi Wong; Paul Chun
- Theme music composer: Chan Chung-hung
- Opening theme: The Fairy Tale of Life (歲月的童話) by Gallen Lo
- Ending theme: Bright and Sunny Days (陽光燦爛的日子) by Gallen Lo; When Love Comes to an End (當愛情走到盡頭) by Gallen Lo
- Country of origin: Hong Kong
- Original language: Cantonese
- No. of episodes: 45

Production
- Producer: Tommy Leung
- Production locations: Hong Kong; Perth, Western Australia
- Camera setup: Multi camera
- Running time: 45 minutes (approx.)
- Production company: TVB

Original release
- Network: TVB Jade
- Release: 16 September – 15 November 2002

Golden Faith is a 2002 Hong Kong television drama produced by TVB, starring Gallen Lo, Deric Wan, Jessica Hsuan, Raymond Lam, Anne Heung, Myolie Wu, Tavia Yeung, Michelle Ye, Paul Chun, Lau Dan, Shek Sau, Kwok Fung, Lau Kong, and Gigi Wong. It was Gallen Lo's final performance in a dramatic epic before leaving TVB, Deric Wan's comeback role, Myolie Wu's breakthrough, and Felix Lok's first major role. It was billed as "a major production from the makers of At the Threshold of an Era".

== Synopsis ==
Ivan Ting Sin-boon (Gallen Lo) is orphaned at young age and was adopted by Ting Wing-pong (Paul Chun), the Chairman of Ting Fung Gold Smith Group, a jeweller in Hong Kong. His real name is Chung Tin-yan and his family died in a ship wreck when he was a child coming to Hong Kong. Ivan grew up knowing the business ethics his father went through as he built his empire, which included smuggling and money laundering, but never got involved in the operations himself. No one knows of his true identity, not even his adopted mother and siblings.

On a trip to Perth, Australia, he meets Rachel Ching Tin-lam (Jessica Hsuan). After a few incidents, they are brought together. As they are about to begin a relationship together, Ivan is called back to Hong Kong due to one of his father's old business partners requesting help. During this incident, he gets into trouble with the law; he crosses paths with an undercover police officer, Chung Sau-hong (Deric Wan) who is out to put an end to their illegal operations. Ivan is soon arrested for what seems like an illegal transaction between himself and his father's old partner but in reality he simply gives money without actually taking the "goods". When he faces his case in court, the prosecutor is none other than Rachel. After clearing the misunderstandings, he manages to embark on a relationship with her.

However, in the middle of their relationship, Ivan is faced with more and more crises. On one hand, he believes he killed Law Kai-cheung (Kwok Fung) while trying to save his sister, Yan (Myolie Wu). On the other, he is constantly helping his family avoid legal prosecution due to their past. This puts a strain on their relationship.

Ivan's good friend, Sabrina Kwai Lai-fu (Anne Heung), who loves Ivan with all her heart, is constantly tormented by Jonathan Hung Pak-to (Shek Sau), his rival business partner. Jonathan steals a precious crown meant from Ting Fung Gold Smith and she is forced to make a sacrifice of sleeping with him to get it back. Eventually, Jonathan pushes her too far and she kills him. As a result, Ivan decides to fully give up his relationship with Rachel because of obligation to Sabrina.

When his father dies, he is left with a majority of the family fortune and is the principal stakeholder, making him CEO and Chairman of Ting Fung Gold Smith. This upsets his second-uncle greatly. His younger brother Oscar, who studied in America, comes back to help in the family business despite initially hesitating and preferring to pursue a career in marine biology.

Oscar accidentally hits someone with his car one day and their second uncle uses this incident to twist Oscar's mind into hating Ivan, initiating a power struggle between the two brothers that will lead to Ivan's true identity being revealed. Oscar is not pleased that a non-Ting member holds the ruling power in the company. Ivan agrees to allow Oscar to be the new CEO with a few stipulations.

Their second uncle continues to scheme, attempting to revert the company back into the money laundering scheme it used to be. Eventually Rachel goes out with Hong and he is revealed to be Ivan's younger brother who was thought to have died at sea. Sabrina leaves Ivan due to being constantly reminded of her time with Pak-to. Soon after, Ivan and Hong reconcile, leading to Ivan and Rachel's increased interaction once again. She starts to understand his complex life and realizes why he made the choices he made and how it burdens him so. Ivan's personality makes her realize who she truly loved and she reconsiders her relationship with Hong. Meanwhile, Oscar is driven further and further down the wrong path by their second uncle.

Eventually, Oscar realizes the error of his ways and Ivan regains control of Gold Smith, exposing their second uncle. Once he realizes his late-father's dream for the company, he is free to pursue his relation with Rachel once again. In the end, Ivan and Rachel live happily ever after in Perth.

== Cast ==
=== Main cast ===
- Gallen Lo as Ivan Ting
- Deric Wan as Chung Sau-hong
- Jessica Hsuan as Rachel Ching
- Raymond Lam as Oscar Ting
- Myolie Wu as Ting Sin-yan
- Michelle Ye as Rain Ching
- Tavia Yeung as Kiko Chung
- Anne Heung as Sabrina Kwai
- Paul Chun as Ting Wing-pong
- Gigi Wong as Ebel Ting
- Felix Lok as Ting Wing-tung
- Kwok Fung Law Kai-cheung
- Shek Sau as Jonathan Hung

=== Additional cast ===
- Benz Hui as Henry Kam
- Wilson Tsui as Jack Chiu
- Lau Dan as Chung Wai-kuk
- Lau Kong as Ching Choi-san
- Patricia Liu as Moon
- Ron Ng as Kwan Siu-chau
- Carlo Ng as Sunny Leung
- Power Chan as Szeto Kai

=== Cameos ===
- Bernice Liu as Alice Yiu
- Law Lok-lam as Howard Yiu
- Leila Tong
- Kenneth Ma as Doctor
- Gregory Charles Rivers as Jewelry Design Instructor

== Awards and nominations ==
Award	Category	Recipient	Result	Top 5
TVB Anniversary Awards 2002	My Favourite Actor in a Leading Role	Gallen Lo	Won	Entered
TVB Anniversary Awards 2002	My Favourite Actor in a Leading Role	Deric Wan	Nominated	—
TVB Anniversary Awards 2002	My Favourite Actor in a Leading Role	Raymond Lam	Nominated	—
TVB Anniversary Awards 2002	My Favourite Actress in a Leading Role	Jessica Hsuan	Nominated	Entered
TVB Anniversary Awards 2002	My Favourite Actress in a Leading Role	Anne Heung	Nominated	—
TVB Anniversary Awards 2002	My Favourite Vastly Improved Actor	Raymond Lam	Nominated	
TVB Anniversary Awards 2002	My Favourite Vastly Improved Actress	Myolie Wu	Won	
TVB Anniversary Awards 2002	My Favourite Vastly Improved Actress	Tavia Yeung	Nominated	
TVB Anniversary Awards 2002	My Favourite On-Screen Partners (Dramas)	Gallen Lo, Jessica Hsuan	Nominated	
TVB Anniversary Awards 2002	My Favourite On-Screen Partners (Dramas)	Gallen Lo, Anne Heung	Nominated	
TVB Anniversary Awards 2002	My Favourite On-Screen Partners (Dramas)	Deric Wan, Jessica Hsuan	Nominated	
TVB Anniversary Awards 2002	My Top Favourite Television Characters	Jessica Hsuan	Won	
TVB Anniversary Awards 2002	My Top Favourite Television Characters	Gallen Lo	Won	
