= Crocodile Island (film) =

- Film poster
- Traditional Chinese: 巨鱷島
- Simplified Chinese: 巨鳄岛
- Hanyu Pinyin: Jù È Dǎo
- Jyutping: Geoi6 Ngok3 Dou2
- Directed by: Xu Shixing; Simon Zhao
- Screenplay by: Ni Minming
- Produced by: CiCi Lu
- Starring: Gallen Lo; Liao Yinyue; Wang Bingxiang; Hu Xue'er; He Qiwei; Zhao Zuo; Dang Wei; Zhao Zhiyan
- Cinematography: Yu Haifeng
- Edited by: Chan Chi-wai
- Music by: Zhong Zonghao; Wang Wei
- Production companies: A New Studios Media Group Production; Perfect Pictures and Media; TVZone Media; Guangdong JY Media; Beijing Ene Easy Network Science and Technology
- Distributed by: iQiyi
- Release date: 4 February 2020
- Running time: 86 minutes
- Country: China
- Languages: Mandarin; English
- Budget: ¥8 million
- Box office: ¥16.70 million

Crocodile Island is a 2020 Chinese action monster film directed by Xu Shixing and Simon Zhao, and starring Gallen Lo as a single father who lands on a crocodile island with his daughter (Liao Yinyue) due to a plane malfunction and must battle with beast-sized creatures inhabiting the island. This web film was released for online streaming on 4 February 2020 on iQiyi. Crocodile Island became a commercial success, grossing ¥16.70 million against a budget of ¥8 million and is currently the highest-grossing web film of 2020 in China.

== Plot ==
The surrounding areas of the Devil's Sea is also known as the Bermuda Triangle of Asia. Due to electromagnetic interference, aviation accidents are common in the region. Lin Hao (Gallen Lo) and his daughter Yi (Liao Yinyue) are passengers of Flight GZ261. As it flies over the Devil's Sea, the plane malfunctions, causing an emergency landing on a crocodile island. Hao and other driving passengers encounter giant sized crocodiles and spiders and engages in a battle for survival. When Yi is captured by the giant beasts, Hao fights for his life to rescue his daughter.

== Cast ==
- Gallen Lo as Lin Wei (林浩)
- Liao Yinyue as Lin Yi (林伊)
- Wang Bingxiang as Cheng Jie (程杰)
- Dang Wei as Li Zhi (李治)
- Hu Xue'er as Jin Jiayan (金佳妍)
- He Qiwei as Cao Fang (曹方)
- Zhao Zuo as Lu Wenbing (路文兵)
- Zhao Zhiyan as Shao Liqi (邵麗琪)
- Jack Wayne as Bill (比爾)
- Bruce Allen as Andrew (安德魯)
- Su Man as Gao Wen (高文)
- Cai Tingting as Female passenger
- Meng Lichao as Passenger
- Zhang Cangyu as Crew member
- Zheng Cunyuan as 181 passenger
- Han Jinyue as Injured passenger
- Patrick Alleyn as Captain
- Zhao Jinyi as First officer
- Guo Lei as Greedy passenger
- Yu Shichao as Male passenger

== Reception ==
=== Critical ===
Crocodile Island earned a score of 2.8/5 stars on the Chinese media rating site, Douban. Criticism was directed towards the film's clichéd plot and poor CGI effects.

=== Box office ===
Despite its low rating and lack of known cast members besides Gallen Lo, the film was a steady hit. The film earned ¥1.53 million on its first day of release on 4 February 2020, topping other web films. By its second day of release, it has earned ¥3 million. By its fifth day of release, it has reached a gross ¥8 million, recuperating its budget. After playing for seven days, the film had reached the ¥10 million mark.

By 2 March 2020, the film has earned ¥14.03 million, with a total of 5.614 million views. As of 31 March 2020, Crocodile Island had grossed a total of ¥16.70 million and is currently the highest-grossing web film of 2020 in China.
