= Secret of the Heart =

Hong Kong television series

- Official poster
- 天地豪情
- Genre: Drama; Financial thriller
- Screenplay by: Alex Pau; Chow Yuk-ming; Cheung Siu-fong; Ho Kwan-ngo; Tang Chi-san; Fong Sai-keung; Ma Ka-wai; Lo Mei-wan; Mak Chi-sing; Tsang Fung-yu
- Directed by: Cheng Kei-sing; Joe Chan; Lam Chi-wah; Chung Kwok-keung; Wong Wai-sam; Ng Ka-kan
- Starring: Felix Wong; Gallen Lo; Sunny Chan; Nick Cheung; Amy Kwok; Kathy Chow; Jessica Hsuan; Ada Choi; Paul Chun; Suet Nei; Melissa Ng
- Theme music composer: 1: Lo Kin; 2: Chan Chun-hung
- Opening theme: 1: It Still Hurts (仍然在痛) by Gallen Lo; 2: Say to Heaven, Say to Earth, Say to Emptiness (說天說地說空虛) by Gallen Lo
- Ending theme: 1: Can't Wait (等不到) by Gallen Lo; 2: Their Truth, I Understand Your Secret (其實我明白你暗示) by Gallen Lo; 3: Good Dreams Hard To Fulfill (好夢難圓) by Gallen Lo
- Composer: Chan Chung-hung
- Country of origin: Hong Kong
- Original language: Cantonese
- No. of episodes: 62

Production
- Producer: Jonathan Chik
- Production locations: Hong Kong; Toronto, Canada
- Camera setup: Multi camera
- Running time: 45 minutes
- Production company: TVB

Original release
- Network: Jade; HD Jade
- Release: 16 February – 10 May 1998

Secret of the Heart
- Traditional Chinese: 天地豪情
- Simplified Chinese: 天地豪情
- Literal meaning: "Brave Emotions of Heaven and Earth"
Transcriptions
Standard Mandarin
- Hanyu Pinyin: tiān dì háo qíng
Yue: Cantonese
- Jyutping: tin1 dei6 hou4 cing4

Secret of the Heart is a 1998 Hong Kong television drama produced by TVB that was first aired from 16 February to 10 May 1998. The drama had a powerful roster cast that is made up of Felix Wong, Gallen Lo, Sunny Chan, Nick Cheung, Amy Kwok, Kathy Chow, Jessica Hsuan and Ada Choi. It won three TVB Anniversary Awards, including Best Actor for Gallen Lo, Best Actress for Ada Choi and Best On-Screen Improvement Award for Nick Cheung.

The drama also received a late night hour rerun during 2003 and 2010. It was digitally remastered for the 2010 rerun.

== Plot ==
Winson Cheuk (Gallen Lo) is a compulsive gambler who just returned to Hong Kong after a bout of bad luck and extreme debts in Toronto, Ontario, Canada. He was reunited with his childhood friend and neighbor, Abby Ching (Amy Kwok) who is disgusted with his gambling habits and laziness.

The Ching family had a dark secret that no one knows about. More than 20 years ago, Koo Yuk-mei (Suet Nei), was raped by Kam Shu-pui (Paul Chun). This resulted in the birth of Johnny Ching (Sunny Chan) whom Mei despise greatly. Growing up with his two sisters Abby and Mandy (Kathy Chow), Johnny never knew why his mother treated him badly ever since he was a child.

As fate would have it, Abby ended up working with Michael Kam (Felix Wong) who is the younger brother of Kam Shu-pui. At the same time, the sudden reemergence of Kelvin Kam (Nick Cheung), who is the son of Yuk-mei and her husband cleared away the mystery surrounding the Ching and Kam family: Yuk-mei's husband died shortly after giving birth to Kelvin and she could not afford to care for all her children. In an effort to make Kam Shu-pui pay for what he did to her and her family, she decided to switch Kelvin with Johnny when Yip Cho-chi (Pak Yan), Kam Shu-pui's wife comes to claim back the child.

The fact that Kelvin and Johnny's identities were switched was accidentally made known to Kelvin. Because he is used to the good life, Kelvin schemed to eliminate Johnny so that Johnny will not have the chance inherit the Kam family's properties.

== Cast ==
=== The Cheuk family ===
- Bowie Wu as Cheuk Yat-fu (卓一夫), father of Winson and Cheuk Seung-mo who is a neighbor of the Ching family and secretly admires Koo Yuk-mei.
- Gallen Lo as Winson Cheuk (卓尚文), the drama's main protagonist, a compulsive gambler returning from Toronto who had lost all his earnings from gambling, which also led to the abandonment by his fiance. After returning to Hong Kong, Winson eventually strives to make an effort to be successful. He is the ex-boyfriend of Apple Ko and Joe Kam and has an on and off relationship with Abby Ching before marrying with her in the end.
- Jerry Lamb as Cheuk Seung-mo (卓尚武), nicknamed Table Dance (桌上舞), Winson's younger brother who works as Kelly Tung's subordinate in the advertising department of Century Airlines.

=== The Kam family ===
- Paul Chun as Kam Shu-pui (甘樹培), the former chairman of Yee Hoi Corporation. During his youth, he raped Koo Yuk-mei, resulting in the birth of Johnny Ching. Shu-pui was later framed by Frankie Tung and was imprisoned as a result. After his release from prison, he suffered from a stroke and was diagnosed with Parkinson's disease, losing his ability to communicate and work.
- Pak Yan as Yip Cho-chi (葉楚芝), Kam Shu-pui's wife, mother of Maggie and Jo Kam, and adopted mother of Kelvin Kam.
- Felix Wong as Michael Kam (甘樹生), the current chairman of Yee Hoi Corporation and Shu-pui's younger brother, who used to be the boss of a real estate company and finance company respectively. Michael marries with Abby, but their marriage ends in a divorce when he has an affair with Abby's younger sister, Mandy, and impregnating her. Still deeply in love with Abby, Michael injures Winson when he thought Winson was pursuing her and left him unconscious, giving a chance for Kelvin Kam to frame to prison. Later during a sneak attack staged by Kelvin, Michael loses 70% of his eyesight.
- Josephine Lam as Maggie Kam (甘鳳英), Kam Shu-pui and Yip Cho-chi's eldest daughter and ex-wife of Frankie Tung.
- Melissa Ng as Joe Kam (甘鳳欣), Kam Shu-pui and Yip Cho-chi's younger daughter and Winson's ex-girlfriend.

=== The Ching family ===
- Suet Nei as Koo Yuk-mei (顧玉媚), mother of Abby, Mandy, Johnny Ching and Kelvin, whom during her youth, was raped by Kam Shu-pui, which resulted in the birth of Johnny. Yuk-mei gave away her younger son, Kelvin to the Kam family as she could not afford to raise him, despite that Johnny is a true descendant of the Kam family.
- Amy Kwok as Abby Ching (程嘉鳴), Yuk-mei's eldest daughter, Mandy and Kelvin's older sister and Johnny's older half-sister. She was married to Michael Kam, but divorced when her husband had an affair with her sister. Abby had an on and off relationship with Winson before finally marrying with him in the end.
- Kathy Chow as Mandy Ching (程嘉慧), Yuk-mei's second daughter whom had an affair with her brother in-law Michael Kam, which leaves her pregnant with his child. Because she did not want Michael to marry just for the sake of responsibility, she lies about having aborted the child.
- Sunny Chan as Johnny Ching (程家雄), Yuk-mei's son and Abby and Mandy's younger half-brother who was born as a result of his mother being raped Kam Shu-pui, making him the younger half-brother of Maggie and Joe Kam. He is the ex-boyfriend of Kelly Tung and Diana Suen, having an on and off relationship with the latter, breaking up twice before recoiling, and also a good friend of Winson. Johnny is the older half-brother of Kelvin, and started out being good friends with him before Kelvin discovers his true identity and schemes to eliminate Johnny.
- Nick Cheung as Kelvin Kam (甘量宏), Yuk-mei's youngest son who was given to the Kam family as a child. Originally started out as a goodhearted man, Kelvin becomes ruthless after he discovers his identity and schemes to eliminate his older half-brother Johnny in order to maintain his status in the wealthy Kam family.

=== The Tung family ===
- Kam Hing-yin as Frankie Tung (董世鋒), Kelly's older brother who colludes with Kelvin Kam to take over Yee Hoi Corporation. He was once imprisoned from injuring Michael Kam and after his release, he collaborates with Kelvin to smuggle cigarettes, before finally being betrayed by him.
- Jessica Hsuan as Kelly Tung (董若妍), Frankie Tung's younger sister and Johnny Ching's ex-girlfriend. She was once pursued by Kelvin, but she rejects him. Kelly later hires a private investigator to collect evidence of Kelvin's criminal activities.

=== Others ===
- Ada Choi as Diana Suen (孫樺), girlfriend of Johnny, whom she had an on and off relationship with two break ups before reconciling. She later poses as being in love with Kelvin Kam in order to collect evidence of his criminal activities.
- Eileen Yeow as Apple Ko (高雅文), Winson Cheuk ex-girlfriend who develops leukemia and hides it from him to prevent him from worrying.
- Joyce Chan as Nancy Tong (唐美儀), a staff of Century Airlines who has a crush on Johnny.
- Jay Leung as Chow Yin (周燕), a close friend and roommate of Diana who works in a nightclub.
- Samuel Yau as Sam Poon (潘文星), Mandy's ex-boyfriend whom is a painter artist.
- Kara Hui as Lee Suk-wan (李淑雲), Frankie Tung's mistress.
- Li Shing-cheong as Kwok Ying-sun (郭英信), Abby's ex-fiance whom broke up with her for his mistress.
- Kenny Wong as Nelson, Michael Kam's assistant whom was paid by Kam Shu-pui to betray Michael.
- Winnie Yeung as Yuk (玉), Michael's ex-girlfriend.
- Andy Tai as Cheung Wai (張偉), Diana's ex-boyfriend whom is a triad leader.
- Gregory Charles Rivers as the pilots' representative.
- Elton Loo as a private investigator hired by Kelly Tung to collect evidence on Kelvin's criminal activities.

== Awards and nominations ==
Award	Category	Recipient	Result	Top 5
TVB Anniversary Awards 1998	My Favourite Television Program (Dramas)	Secret of the Heart	Nominated	Entered
TVB Anniversary Awards 1998	My Favourite Actor in a Leading Role	Gallen Lo	Won	Entered
TVB Anniversary Awards 1998	My Favourite Actress in a Leading Role	Ada Choi	Won	Entered
TVB Anniversary Awards 1998	My Favourite Actress in a Leading Role	Amy Kwok	Nominated	Entered
TVB Anniversary Awards 1998	My Favourite On-Screen Partners (Dramas)	Gallen Lo, Eileen Yeow	Nominated	Entered
TVB Anniversary Awards 1998	My Favourite On-Screen Partners (Dramas)	Felix Wong, Amy Kwok	Nominated	Entered
TVB Anniversary Awards 1998	Best On-Screen Improvement	Nick Cheung	Won	Entered
