= At the Threshold of an Era =

- Promo poster
- 創世紀
- Genre: Drama; Financial thriller
- Screenplay by: Chow Yuk-ming; Leung Man-wah; Chin Lo; Leung Chi-yin; Choi Suk-yin; Andrew Fung; Fung Ching-man; Siu Wai-yee; Ku Yee-wai; Cheung Siu-fong; Cheung Chung-chai; Au Kin-yee; Ho Kwan-ngo; Tang Chi-san; Tsang Po-wah
- Story by: Sandy Shaw
- Directed by: Chung Kwok-keung; Mak Koon-chi; Joe Chan; Cheng Kei-sing; So Man-chung; Jazz Boon; Lam Chi-wah; Wong Wai-sam; Ng Ka-kan
- Starring: Gallen Lo; Roger Kwok; Sunny Chan; Louis Koo; Kenix Kwok; Flora Chan; Ada Choi; Liza Wang; Maggie Shiu; Nicky Wu; Paul Chun; Kwok Fung; Joe Ma
- Theme music composer: Yukiyo Nakamura (Part I); Andrew Tuason (Part II)
- Opening theme: Creating a Bright Day (創造晴天) by Gallen Lo (Part I); A World with Passion (天地有情) by Gallen Lo (Part II)
- Country of origin: Hong Kong
- Original language: Cantonese
- No. of episodes: 107

Production
- Producer: Jonathan Chik
- Production locations: Hong Kong; Taiwan; Macau; Guangzhou, China; Philippines
- Running time: 45 minutes (approx.)
- Production company: TVB
- Budget: HK$100 million

Original release
- Network: TVB Jade
- Release: 11 October 1999 – 26 May 2000

Related
- Another Era (2018)

At the Threshold of an Era (Chinese: 創世紀) was a Hong Kong epic drama series broadcast by TVB Jade Channel from 11 October to 18 December 1999 and 13 March to 26 May 2000 and was extensively promoted by TVB as its cross-millennium, one-hundred-episode-long epic. The series composed of two parts, with a gap in between airing.

The entire series took place in a continuing flashback, with the protagonist, Tim Yip (Gallen Lo), pondering the trials and tribulations he went through while riding on a train in the "green city" he developed.

In 2022, the drama was selected as one of ten classic TVB dramas being honoured for Youku and TVB's new programme.

== Premise ==
The drama documents the rise and fall of three entrepreneurs, who founded Lik Tin Century Corporation (力天世紀) together to achieve the ultimate goal of developing a pollution-free town in Hong Kong. Vendetta and love serves as strong subplots throughout the series, with the vendetta between two families being the most prominent.

The stories covered a span of 20 years, from 1990 to 2010, and featured many technologies that came to age during this time, including the nascent internet, and a bulkier tamagotchi virtual pet device (shown as a device similar to Game Boy in the series), which was developed by one of the entrepreneurs before his entry into construction.

== Speculation on production ==
It was speculated that the show was not originally meant to become a cross-millennium event, and was rushed into development and broadcast by TVB because of a slump in ratings.

In Hong Kong, TVB is the predominant TV station in terms of ratings, often receiving 90% viewing shares. During the summer of 1999, the Mainland-Taiwanese drama My Fair Princess, aired by rival broadcaster ATV, took away a significant portion of TVB's audience, and came out on top in the ratings battle during certain hours.

It is speculated, but never confirmed, that the managements of TVB drafted its top actors and actresses to perform in the series, and rushed the production into broadcast as a weapon against the resurgent ATV. Supporters of this theory point to the splitting of the series into two parts, with a gap in between the broadcast to allow for production time. Opponents of the speculation assert that ATV only had a one-off hit with My Fair Princess, and there were no other series afterward that could have retained the audience that eventually returned to TVB. The opponents also allude to the fact that even during the lowest point of the entire crisis, TVB still retained a competitive edge in ratings, and would have been able to defeat ATV right after My Fair Princess concluded. However, this still does not provide an explanation to the gap between two series.

== Cost ==
The series was the costliest ever produced in Hong Kong television history, totaling more than HK$100 million (US$12.8 Million), thus creating a record that no other television series has ever been able to break until The Gem of Life in 2008.

== Characters ==
=== Main ===
- Tim Yip Wing-tim (葉榮添, portrayed by Gallen Lo): The main character in the series, and an ambitious entrepreneur, he is the leader of his circle of three friends that established the Lik Tin Century (力天世紀) construction corporation. Throughout the series, Tim has sometimes resorted to rather unsavory tactics to get things done due to his poor upbringing and his lust for revenge. As the main character of the series, he faces many challenges like the constant betrayals of his best friends (especially Michael), the feud between the two branches of Yip families, and the love obstacles with the many women in the series. He cares most of his family and friends yet at the beginning of the story, he was too bent on revenge, resulting in unethical schemes that hurt others around him. But through the long course of the story, he realizes his mistakes and evolved into an honorable person.
- Michael Hui Man-piu (許文彪, portrayed by Sunny Chan): An urban planner and the most educated person in his family, he was the brain of the gang of three, and the most principled one out of all three in the beginning. However, his world begins to fall apart when his estranged family was placed in danger and little by little, opportunities of corruption keeps coming up that could help him solve most of his problems. After a stressful event, he finally succumbs to the glories of dirty tactics and the crisis turned him into the villain of the first series. His evolution was so big that he would eventually turn on everyone he loved just for fame and fortune. He was probably Tim's greatest friend and greatest challenge. Over the course of the first series, Tim first tries to get him to see the benefits of walking outside the straight line and will later try to make him repent his sins. He eventually dies at the end of the first series after being pushed off a cliff.
- Ma Chi-keung (馬志強, portrayed by Roger Kwok): He is the most unimpressive of the group of three due to his naivete but he is very nice towards his parents and friends. He started off as an investment counsellor and joined Lik Tin after he was fired from the bank. After his parents' death, he left the company when he realizes that their deaths were part of a defamation plot hatched by Michael and Tim. Though sometimes considered the weaker one, he is a good-natured innocent boy stuck between Tim and Michael. He is the friendly one who always stops the arguing of the three friends.

=== Yip family ===
Yip Hau-kan's branch

- Yip Hau-kan (葉孝勤, portrayed by Chow Chung): Brother of Howard Yip, and established Ming Dai Group (明大集團), which is now controlled by Howard Yip and his family. He went to prison for his brother over poorly constructed houses that violated safety regulations years before the time of the series, and is currently in retirement.
- Lee Pik-chun (李碧珍, portrayed by Suet Nei): Mother of Tim, and has a housewife mentality, often speaking about matters without knowing what she's talking about. She was once diagnosed with cancer during Ken's time in prison and is now constantly worried about her children.
- Yip Wing-chak (葉榮澤, portrayed by Hawick Lau): An athlete whose dream was to compete professionally. He is usually supportive of his brother. His dreams were dashed during a revenge attack initiated by Michael Hui.
- Cat Yip Nga-man (葉雅汶, portrayed by Grace Ip): A student who doesn't really know what the future brings for her. She is rebellious to Tim, who tries to be strict towards her, and is open to the idea of starting a relationship with Keung. She eventually leaves for the United States to pursue postsecondary education after she was raped in an alleyway.

Howard Yip's branch

- Howard Yip Hau-lai (葉孝禮, portrayed by Paul Chun): Chairman of the Ming Dai Group, which is one of the largest corporations in Asia with hundreds of subsidiary companies. His rise to the top involved treachery towards his brother, Hau-ken, who went to jail for him over poorly constructed houses consisting of concrete mixed with sea water (an illegal building method). His company is mainly into land development and the architectural and realty business but makes much money by taking over investment firms and R&D companies.
- Donald Yip Wing-chun (葉榮晉, portrayed by Joe Ma): First son of Howard. His rich upbringing makes him a spoiled brat and his father's competitive nature makes him resort to devious tactics in business to ensure success. He looks down on Tim Yip and his family and suspects that everyone is out for money when trying to enter affairs with Ming Dai or the Yip family. Out of the three brothers, he is considered the clever, devious and most importantly, the reckless one.
- Eva Lau Suet-ling (劉雪玲, portrayed by Kara Hui): Wife of Donald and pretty useless in terms of contributing to the household. Donald asks her to help him secure funding from a financial banker she once dated which leads to her developing an affair with him.
- Jason Yip Wing-ngai (葉榮毅, portrayed by Lee Wai-kei): Second son of Howard. He was the underrated child as he does not possess the business expertise of Donald and the heart of Joe. His devious sides eventually show and soon hatches a plan to gain his father's favour by teaming up with Michael Hui to take down Donald and kidnapping Joe.
- Joe Yip Wing-hang (葉榮亨, portrayed by Nicky Wu): Third son of Howard. He is at first a playboy, but later becomes more hardworking because of a kidnapping attempt by Michael and Jason. Initially dated Helen Fok, but the relationship ended rather quickly upon Howard's marriage to Helen's mother, which made them brothers and sisters. Due to his lavish upbringing, he was hot-headed and extremely competitive in social circles, often making him commit mistakes in the business world. He was never a fan of Michael Hui due to his affections for Tina. Tina was simply a game for him to overcome at first until her steadfast attitude made him realize the importance of hardwork and earning your position. He eventually realize that his feelings for her is of love. He was kidnapped near the end of the series by his second brother, Jason, in order to rid him from gaining the Chairman position at the Ming Dai group.

=== Fok family ===
- David Fok King-leung (霍景良, portrayed by Kwok Fung): Chairman of the Fok's Group (霍氏集團), and is known for his extremely unsavory tactics and ever-shifting alliance arrangements. Tim Yip worked with him at first to secure Lik Tien's future after a disastrous spell, but later ditches him and battled against him head on. Like Helen, he has a rocky relationship with Tim, often partnering with him when there is profit but his large company makes him a bully of sorts.
- Liza Fong Kin-ping (方健平, portrayed by Liza Wang): Initially wife of David Fok, but later divorced him upon learning that he is cheating on her with her best friend, Sabrina. Eventually married her longtime friend, Howard Yip. She is extremely wise due to her experience in the corporate world and always approach situations in a calm and diplomatic manner.
- Helen Fok Hei-yin (霍希賢, portrayed by Flora Chan): Love interest of Tim Yip, and worked in Lik Tien Century as their legal advisor for that very purpose. She is very emotional in her dealings and that leads to a rollercoaster relationship with Tim. She married Barry in a rebound but eventually realizes that her heart still lies with Tim, especially after a change in his personality.

=== Hui family ===
- Hui Tai-hon (許大漢, portrayed by Lau Kong): Father of Michael Hui and a former police officer. Like most of his family, he is uneducated and extremely arrogant. Now he spends his days in gambling rings and picking fights with anyone that shows even a hint of disrespect. He was shot by police while chasing Tim with a butcher knife and died.
- Cheung Yuk-fong (張玉芳, portrayed by Rainbow Ching): Estranged mother of Michael, who cheated on Michael's father and left for Taiwan. She has another son, Nick Cheung (張自力), who is a gangster at the time Michael knows of his existence.
- Hui Man-kwan (許文坤, portrayed by Andy Dai): Brother of Michael, and is known for acting before thinking. Like his father, he tends to gamble a lot and plays the stock market in hopes of making a big fortune in a short amount of time. He later joins Michael in his schemes to run Ming Fo, once a subsidiary of Ming Dai and is arrested by the ICAC in his brother's place for budgeting fraud.
- Hui Man-ying (許文瑛, portrayed by Celine Ma); Sister of Michael. The most useless sibling and goes into beauty and makeover business ventures with little to no success.
- Nick Cheung Chi-lik (張自力, portrayed by Louis Koo): Half-brother of Michael. Initially fell into a bad crowd due to his poor upbringing in Taiwan, but after a near-death experience where Michael saves him, he tries to redeem himself. Eventually, it is his good brother that leads him back into the wrong path once more.

=== Other characters ===
- Ivy Shum Wing-yan (岑穎欣, portrayed by Kenix Kwok): Love interest of Tim Yip in the first series, she stood by Tim during his hardest hours, and did many things for him with little or no rewards in return. She eventually married Michael and goes into a small business of her own. She has little self-esteem and is always wondering if she's good enough for him. She soon realizes that the sincere and innocent man he once was is now a monstrous villain. She was framed for murdering him by Jason Yip and was jailed in Taiwan. After an escape attempt, she is shot by the police and dies.
- Tina Pang (彭芷蔚, portrayed by Maggie Shiu) An upper-middle-class woman who strives to be successful in all her endeavours. At first is dating Michael Hui but leaves him due to his non-existent ambitions. When he turns a new leaf, she finds herself attracted to him because of his new headstrong and forward looking perspective and is somewhat jealous of Ivy for being with him. She treats Joe like a pet, someone to be used in her business endeavours due to his finances but can never rely on him due to his incompetency and playboy nature. She soon realizes his feelings for her are true and ends up with him only to be kidnapped by Jason along with Joe.
- Barry Kwan (Portrayed by Michael Fitzgerald Wong): A lawyer who studies in the West, he immediately develops an infatuation for Helen which turns into love. He has poor Cantonese skills due to his upbringing in the west and will often mispronounce words and uses English during court proceedings. Unlike Tim, he is an introvert and apologizes too often usually for things that don't even warrant one. He begins a relationship with Helen and eventually marries her until he realizes her heart lies with Tim.
- Sandy Ho (何佩琪, portrayed by Florence Kwok) A lawyer who's working in the same firm as Helen, she often provides Helen with romantic advise. It is ironic because she is in a relationship with a married man which often leads to dramatic antics. She develops feelings for Keung at one point but after his parents' death, she cannot handle his constant dependency on her and his reckless nature due to the lost.
- Tin Ning (田寧, portrayed by Ada Choi) A bar girl that once had a fling with Tim in Taiwan years before the series began however his operational nature and an opportunity for business was always a priority before she was. He eventually leaves her without notifying her. Years later, she is with Nick.

Cameo appearances by Kenneth Ma as Stanley, Lik Tin's stock broker and Raymond Lam as a Taiwanese prison guard.

== Broadcast ==
The series was repeated during late night hours in the summer of 2005, and, to the shock of many analysts, drew impressive ratings. It drew twice the audience comparing to 2004's late night hours rerun. Traditionally, reruns only serve as fillers in the late night hours and were never expected to draw impressive ratings. TVB has since undergone a rethink into the philosophy of reruns and is currently broadcasting more high-quality shows during rerun hours.

== Accolades ==
Year	Award	Category	Recipient	Result	Ref
2002	TVB Anniversary Awards	My Favourite Actor in a Leading Role	Gallen Lo	Top 5	
2002	TVB Anniversary Awards	My Favourite Actor in a Leading Role	Roger Kwok	Nominated	
2002	TVB Anniversary Awards	My Favourite Actor in a Leading Role	Louis Koo	Nominated	
2002	TVB Anniversary Awards	My Favourite Actor in a Leading Role	Paul Chun	Nominated	
2002	TVB Anniversary Awards	My Favourite Actress in a Leading Role	Liza Wang	Nominated	
2002	TVB Anniversary Awards	My Favourite Actress in a Leading Role	Ada Choi	Nominated	
2002	TVB Anniversary Awards	My Favourite Actress in a Leading Role	Kenix Kwok	Nominated	
2002	TVB Anniversary Awards	My Favourite Actress in a Leading Role	Flora Chan	Nominated	
2002	TVB Anniversary Awards	My Favourite On-Screen Partners (Dramas)	Gallen Lo, Kenix Kwok	Nominated	
2002	TVB Anniversary Awards	My Favourite On-Screen Partners (Dramas)	Louis Koo, Ada Choi	Nominated	
2002	TVB Anniversary Awards	My Favourite On-Screen Partners (Dramas)	Liza Wang, Paul Chun	Nominated	
2002	TVB Anniversary Awards	My Top Favourite Television Characters	Louis Koo	Won	
2002	TVB Anniversary Awards	My Top Favourite Television Characters	Gallen Lo	Won	
