= Yankee Boy =

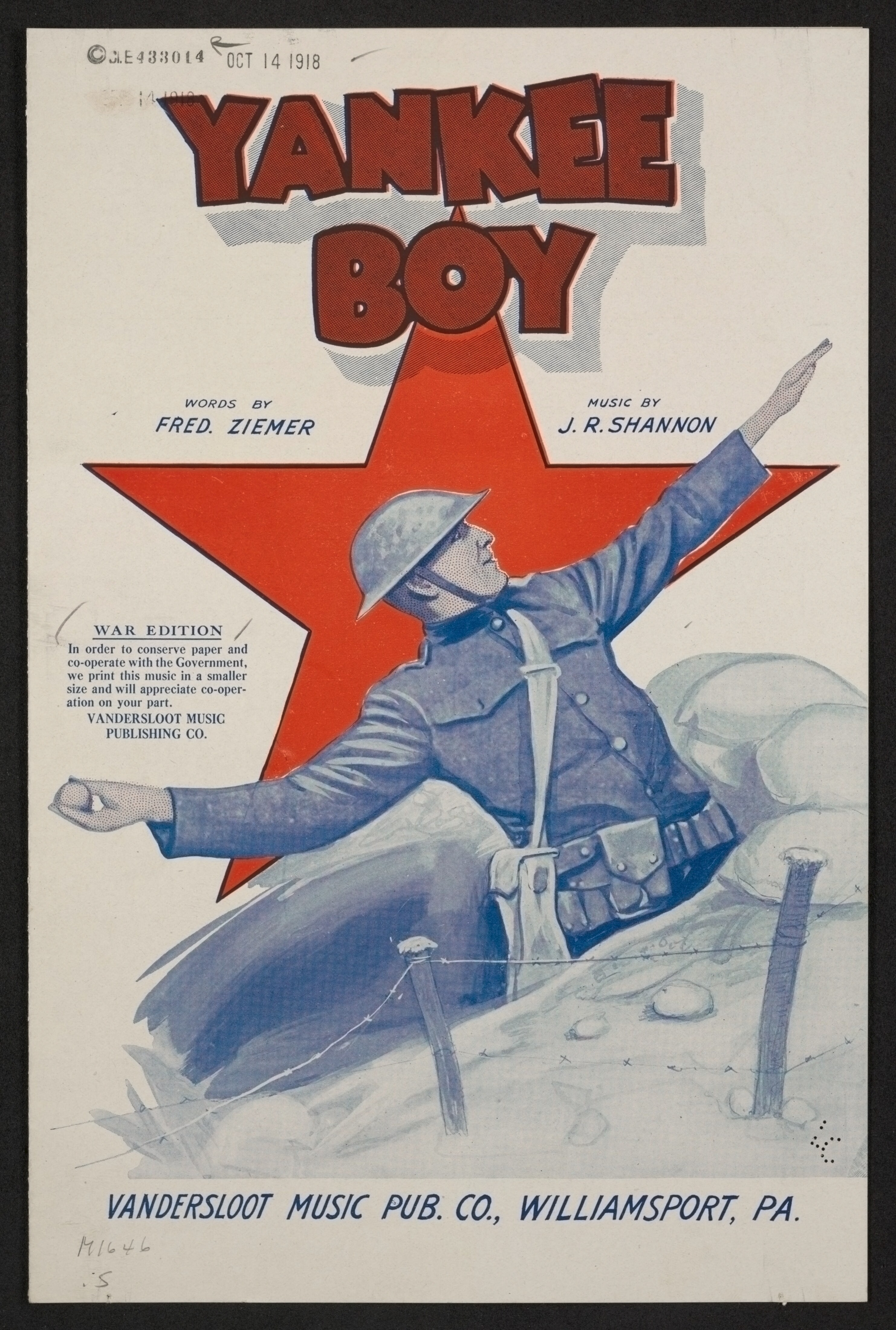
- Cover of sheet music for WWI song Yankee Boy

Song
- Published: Vandersloot Music Publishing Company
- Released: 1918
- Songwriter(s): Composer: J.R. Shannon; Lyricist: Fred Zeimer

"Yankee Boy" is a World War I song. Lyrics were written by Fred Ziemer, and music was composed by J.R. Shannon. Vandersloot Music Publishing Company produced the song in 1918. On the cover of the sheet music, there is a soldier in a trench, throwing a grenade. The song was written for both voice and piano. The lyrics show support for the soldiers fighting in the war, and how the Yankee Boy will "win both fame and glory."
