= Feminine Masculinity =

- Promo poster
- Also known as: Mr. Diana
- 先生貴性
- Genre: Comedy; Supernatural drama Mystery
- Screenplay by: Chow Yuk-ming; Kwan Ching-man; Fung Ching-man; Andrew Fung; Cat Kwan
- Directed by: Ng Ka-kan; Lam Cgi-wah; Chung Kwok-keung; Wong Wai-sam
- Starring: Gallen Lo; Flora Chan; Kwong Wa; Nicola Cheung; Angela Tong; Florence Kwok
- Opening theme: Tui Nei Ngor Wing Pat Fong Hei (對你我永不放棄) by Gallen Lo and Flora Chan
- Ending theme: Mei Loi Mut Fat Kai Suen (未來沒法計算) by Gallen Lo
- Composer: Albert Hammond
- Country of origin: Hong Kong
- Original language: Cantonese
- No. of episodes: 20

Production
- Executive producer: Jonathan Chik
- Production location: Hong Kong
- Camera setup: Multi camera
- Running time: 45 minutes (per episode)
- Production company: TVB

Original release
- Network: TVB Jade
- Release: 1 March – 26 March 1999

Feminine Masculinity (Chinese: 先生貴性), also known as Mr. Diana, is a 1999 Hong Kong television drama produced by TVB. It stars Gallen Lo, Flora Chan, Kwong Wa, Nicola Cheung, Angela Tong, and Florence Kwok. The drama is about Tang Ping-kuen, the village head of Lucky Village, who is always at loggerheads with businesswoman Christine Fong. One day, Christine was shot dead during a paintball game. Since then, the spirit of Christine could not rest in peace until she finds out who murdered her. She decides to take host on Kuen's body. Since then, Kuen became known as Diana to his colleagues once Christine possesses him.

== Cast ==
- Flora Chan as Christine Fong Sze-Ching, the main protagonist.
- Gallen Lo as Tang Ping-kuen / Diana Szema Wing-Kam, the village head of Lucky Village whom Christine's ghost takes host of after she dies.
- Kwong Wa as Andrew Cheung Ho-Wah, Christine's husband.
- Nicola Cheung as Sardonna Fong Sze-Hung, Christine's younger sister.
- Angela Tong as Sophia So Lai-Ying, Christine's secretary.
- Florence Kwok as Francoise Lee Fan- Fong, Christine's rival.
- Dickson Lee as Inspector William Chung Wai-Lim, the inspector in charge of investigating Christine's death.
- Jerry Ku Ming-Wah as Jacky Fong Sze-Long, Christine's younger brother.
- Ku Feng as Officer Tommy Tang Kau, Kuen's uncle and William's subordinate who has extrasensory perception.
- Lo Mang as Tang Siu-fung and Kenny Wong as Kiu Muk, Kuen's two best friends.
- Teresa Ha as Chan Shuk-ying, Kuen's aunt.
- Alice Fung So-bor as Law Pik-kuen, Christine's mother.
- Joe Junior as Joe Leung Cho-Yam, Christine's boss.
- Steven Ho as Choi, Lee Wai-kei as Michael Tang, and Lee Chi-kei as Chung, Christine's subordinates.

== Plot ==
Kuen is the headman of a rural village. Once he managed to save a person in danger very courageously, and since then he has been boasted of being a true hero. Thinking that KUEN is an object of public opinion, Ching, a tough competent businesswoman invites him to star in a commercial. During their co-operation, the arrogant, self-assured Ching has had a number of clashes with the egotistic Kuen, a most typical masculinist.

One day, they both come under attack and at last Kuen luckily survives while Ching is killed. Having died a very unnatural death, Ching is filled with grievance and is determined to locate her killer. Her spirit transmigrates into Kuen's body and disguises as a returned overseas Chinese named Diana. She joins the company she worked for in the name of Diana to look for clues.

In the course of the investigation, Ching discovers that her younger sister Hung is not that innocent and worst of all, is likely to further degenerate. Ching needs Kuen to woo Hung in the hope that he, after becoming Hung's boyfriend, can teach her right from wrong. In time as expected, Hung and Kuen fall in love. Meanwhile, Ching learns that her husband Wah has been having an affair with his secretary Ying all along. Bit by bit, Ching can finally piece together a full picture of her murder....
