= Cold Blood Warm Heart =

1996 Hong Kong television series

- Official poster
- 天地男兒
- Genre: Crime thriller Romantic drama
- Screenplay by: Pau Wai-chung; Chow Yuk-ming; Lau Siu-kwan; Tai Tak-kwong; Fong Sai-keung; Wong Kin; Cheung Siu-fong; Ku Yee-lai; Tang Kin-sing; Choi Yuk-ying; Pang Wai; Leung Man-wah
- Directed by: Chung Shu-kai; Wong Chun-man; Lam Kin-long; Ma Koon-chi; Chung Kwok-keung; Joe Chan; Kwan Wing-chung
- Starring: Adam Cheng; Gallen Lo; Julian Cheung; Louis Koo; Christine Ng; Jessica Hsuan; Adia Chan; Maggie Cheung
- Opening theme: "從不放棄" (Never Give Up) by Adam Cheng
- Country of origin: Hong Kong
- Original language: Cantonese
- No. of episodes: 65

Production
- Producer: Jonathan Chik
- Production location: Hong Kong
- Camera setup: Multi camera
- Running time: approx. 45 minutes
- Production company: TVB

Original release
- Network: TVB Jade
- Release: 5 February – 26 April 1996

Cold Blood Warm Heart
- Traditional Chinese: 天地男兒
- Simplified Chinese: 天地男儿
- Literal meaning: "Men of Heaven of Earth"
Transcriptions
Standard Mandarin
- Hanyu Pinyin: Tiān Dì Nán Ér
Yue: Cantonese
- Jyutping: Tin1 Dei6 Naam4 Ji4

Cold Blood Warm Heart (traditional Chinese: 天地男兒; simplified Chinese: 天地男儿) is a 1996 Hong Kong crime thriller and romantic drama television series produced by TVB. The series had a total of 65 episodes, airing from 5 February to 26 April 1996 on TVB Jade. The television series was broadcast again by TVB in 2022.

== Plot ==
Tsui Wing-pong (Adam Cheng) and Tsui Ka-lap (Gallen Lo) are adopted brothers. Wing-pong was sent to the Tsui family when he was very young because his biological father abandoned the family during a difficult period. Over the years, Wing-pong bears a deep grudge against his biological father, who is the owner of the Yip family bank. At the same time, the Yip family had a dark past and some dangerous secrets.

Lo Chi-kin (Julian Cheung) is the new head of Wing-pong's division at the police station. He has a sister Rebecca Lo Wai-fong (Christine Ng), for whom Wing-pong had an unrequited love. Chi-kin and his best friend Yip Sing-hong (Louis Koo) fall in love with Fong Hau-yung (Adia Chan), who works at the bank run by the Yip family and so was she. However, Chi-kin and Hau-yung were forced to give up on each other, due to some circumstances, and Chi-kin ends up marrying Cheung Suet-ying (Jessica Hsuan), who is actually in love with Wing-pong's brother, Tsui Ka-lap.

During one murder case, Wing-pong was falsely accused as the murderer and was sent to jail. Following his release, he discovered that his brother, Ka-lap, was the real murderer and was also involved in many other criminal activities. It was later revealed that Ka-lap had the backing of the Yip family to commit the crimes he did. Seeing that there is no other choice, Wing-pong embarked on a dangerous journey to capture Ka-lap and to investigate the dark secrets that the Yip family held, but not without the unforeseen consequences of the sacrifice that the major characters had to make.

== Cast ==
- Adam Cheng as Tsui Wing-pong (徐永邦), the main protagonist of the series, the adopted son of the Tsui family whom was abandoned by his father, banking tycoon Yip Sing, during his youth. Wing-pong was originally a police sergeant, but was later framed by his adopted brother, Tsui Ka-lap, for the murder of corrupt police superintendent Tai Shu-piu and was imprisoned. Wing-pong later successfully appealed and was released without charge, and afterwards, collaborates with his niece Yip Hiu-fung and nephew Yip Sing-hong to rescue Wah Yip Bank, counter-working against Ka-lap.
- Gallen Lo as Tsui Ka-lap (徐家立), the main antagonist of the series, a senior police inspector and eldest son of the family. With the backing of Wing-pong's half brother, Yip Wing-cheung, Ka-lap frames Wing-pong for the murder of his superior officer, Tai Shu-piu, who had been scheming with Ka-lap and Wing-cheung to smuggle drugs. Ka-lap, who had been taken advantage by Wing-cheung the whole time, manages to sabotage the latter, and seizes half of the stocks of Wah Yip Bank, before murdering Wing-cheung.
- Julian Cheung as Lo Chi-kin (羅子建), a senior police inspector and Wing-pong's superior officer. Chi-kin and Wing-pong originally disliked each other, but after the case of the murder of Wing-pong's half brother Yip Wing-kei where the two of them were suspended from duties, they settled their differences.
- Louis Koo as Yip Sing-hong (葉承康), Wing-pong's nephew and Chi-kin's best friend. Sing-hong and Chi-kin both had a crush on Fong Hau-yung, and ends up dating her. However, Sing-hong breaks up with Hau-yung to protect her when he discovered the secret that his father, Yip Wing-cheung, was the culprit behind his uncle, Yip Wing-kei's abduction, and Sing-hon was also forced by Ka-lap to betray Wai Yip Bank.
- Christine Ng as Rebecca Lo (羅惠芳), Chi-kin's older sister who is an instructor. She develops a relationship with Wing-pong and after a full of setbacks, eventually marries Wing-pong.
- Adia Chan as Fong Hau-yung (方巧容), an employee working at Wah Yip bank. As a child, Hau-yung suffered from septal defect. Although Chi-kin and Sing-hong fell in love with Hau-yung at the same time, she loved the former.
- Jessica Hsuan as Michelle Cheung (張雪凝), Tsui Ka-lap's ex-girlfriend who almost ends up marrying Lo Chi-kin, even though she is still very much in love with the former.

== Reception ==
In a mixed review, a Wen Wei Po reviewer wrote, "The script's structure is extremely unbalanced. On one hand, it keeps dragging out the romantic relationships—every time those five young actors' so-called love scenes appear, the entire plot comes to a halt."
