= The Dance of Passion =

- 火舞黃沙
- Genre: Period Drama
- Starring: Bowie Lam; Moses Chan; Ada Choi; Gigi Lai; Charmaine Sheh; Maggie Shiu; Kenny Wong; Chan Hung Lit; Chung King Fai; Vinci Wong
- Opening theme: "Wind and Sand" (風沙) by Bowie Lam
- Ending theme: "Lovers Within the Yellow Sand" (黃沙中的戀人) by Charmaine Sheh
- Country of origin: Hong Kong
- Original language: Cantonese
- No. of episodes: 32

Production
- Producer: Jonathan Chik
- Running time: 45 minutes (approx.)

Original release
- Network: TVB
- Release: May 1 – June 12, 2006

The Dance of Passion (Traditional Chinese: 火舞黃沙) is a TVB period drama series broadcast in May 2006.

The series was filmed in Yinchuan, (Ningxia in mainland China) and Hong Kong.

== Synopsis ==
The entire series revolves around the lives of two clans: the Yim clan (閻族) and the Sung Clan (宋族), in the Loess Plateau area of the Shanbei region during the Republican era.

In a time before the series, a plague swept through the area where the Yim clan lives, pushing the clan to near extinction. However, the Sung clan arrived and taught the Yim clan to use gunpowder to ward off the plague. Later, after the disease was eradicated, the Sung clan taught the Yim clan the art of making fireworks and firecrackers, and this brought the Yim clan a new level of prosperity. In gratitude, the Yim clan elders of the time issued an edict, ordering the entire Yim clan and their descendants to care for all members of the Sung clan from cradle to grave, with no exceptions.

This edict is the foundation of the conflict central to the series. By the time of the series, the Sung clan is a shadow of its former self, with no brilliant or prominent clansmen of significant accomplishment. As a result, the entire Sung clan has become reliant on the care of the Yim clan. This has caused the Yim clan to perceive the Sung clan as parasites. The series focuses on the rivalries between these two formerly harmonious clans, and the efforts by the Yim clan to remove the Sung clan from their settlement. This, in addition to the intra-clan rivalries in the Sung and the Yim clans, and the constant threat from a group of bandits known as the Horseback Bandits, set the tone of the entire series.

== Cast ==
=== The Yim clan ===
Cast	Role	Description
Chung King Fai	Yim Kwok-Yip 閻國業	Yim Man-Hei and Yim Man-Yip's father. Yim Siu-Hung Yim Kwok-Gei's older brother.
Bowie Lam	Yim Man-Hei 閻萬曦	Yim Kwok-Yip's son. Kai Ming-Fung's husband. Yim Man-Tin's older brother. Chiu Yuk's lover.
Gigi Lai	Kai Ming-Fung 計明鳳	Yim Man-Hei's wife.
Vinci Wong (王賢誌)	Yim Man-Tin 閻萬天	Yim Kwok-Yip's son. Yim Man-Hei's younger brother. Kai Ming-Fung's ex-lover.
Rebecca Chan	Yim Siu-Hung 閻少虹	Yim Kwok-Yip and Yim Kwok-Gei's younger sister.
Tsui Wing (徐榮)	Yim Kwok-Gei 閻國基	Yim Kwok-Yip and Yim Siu-Hung's brother.

=== The Sung clan ===
Cast	Role	Description
Moses Chan	Sung Tung-Sing 宋東昇	Ka Chun-Fun's husband.
Ada Choi	Chiu Yuk 焦玉	Sung Clan Leader; Yim Man-Hei's lover.
Charmaine Sheh	Ka Chun-Fun 家春分	Sung Tung-Sing's wife. Sung Tung-Yeung's ex-wife.
Kenny Wong (黃德斌)	Sung Tung-Yeung 宋東陽	Su Long-Yuet's husband. Ka Chun-Fun's ex-husband.
Maggie Shiu	Su Long-Yuet 舒朗月	Sung Tung-Yeung's wife.
Helen Ma (馬海倫)	Gwai Lan 桂蘭	

=== Other cast ===
Cast	Role	Description
Chan Hung Lit (陳鴻烈)	Mau To 茅土	Mau Siu-Kam and Mau Siu-Cheuk's father.
Catherine Chau (周家怡)	Mau Siu-Kam 茅小琴	Mau To's daughter.
Reyan Yan (殷櫻)	Mau Siu-Cheuk 茅小卓	Mau To's daughter.

== Characters ==
- Yim Man-Hei (Bowie Lam) is the bullying, tyrannical leader of the Yim clan, and boss of the Yim clan's business operations: the "Kat Hing Tong (吉慶堂)". He and his brother, Yim Man-Tin, have relied on each other ever since their mother died. A childhood accident left Man-Hei deaf, but his brutal and ruthless streaks promotes him to be the clan leader.
- Yim Kwok-Yip (Chung King Fai) is the retired Yim clan leader who appears to be genial and well-tempered which concealed a ruthless and cruel personality. He is the constant stirrer of controversies within the Yim clan.
- Yim Kwok-Tin (Vinci Wong) is a timid, well-mannered, and educated member of the Yim clan, often used by others as a pawn in their overall power struggle.
- Yim Siu-Hung (Rebecca Chan) is the sister of Yim Kwok-Yip, who was almost beaten to death by Kwok-Yip when she discovered his affair with a Sung clan woman. The assault led to her paralysis, which created massive guilt for Kwok-Yip.
- Kai Ming-Fung (Gigi Lai) is the wife of Yim Man-Hei, who is almost always treated by Man-Hei with suspicion. She is very intelligent and can view people with her perspective of their personality and the situation. At first she and her husband quarrel a lot and have many arguments but slowly their relationship changes.
- Sung Tung-Sing (Moses Chan) is part of the Sung clan who fell in love with a widow. This led to an execution by firecrackers (in what the two clans call "the Lighting of the Heavenly Lights") that was stopped by sheer luck. He was subsequently banished from the Sung clan, but managed to return shortly thereafter.
- Ka Chun-Fun (Charmaine Sheh) was scheduled to marry Sung Tung-Sing in an arranged marriage, but the marriage was annulled because of Tung-Sing's ousting from the Sung clan. This led to her being labeled as a person of bad luck. She was forced to marry Sung Tung-Yeung afterwards, but the marriage ends in disaster.
- Chiu Yuk (Ada Choi) is the conniving head of the Sung clan who took power upon the death of the Clan elder by forging a will. She was involved in an elaborate plan to exact revenge for her son's death towards the end of the series.
- Sung Tung-Yeung (Kenny Wong) is part of the Sung clan who eventually rose to the level of Clan leader. His secret of impotence was hidden from the Sung Clan.
- Mao To (Chan Hung Lit) is a well-digger who came from a family with an illustrious history of well-digging. He is also the father of the widow that Tung-Shing fell in love with.

== Critical response ==
TVB had been promoting this series heavily, thus creating a huge hype for the series even before it began its run. An early premiere along the lines of Hollywood movie premieres was held on April 24, 2006, at the International Finance Centre Palace. Many refer to this series as the "War and Beauty II" due to its striking similarity of the cast (with the exception of Maggie Cheung and Sheren Tang, the latter allegedly due to contract disputes), most of the cast remained the same with the addition of Ada Choi and Maggie Shiu. Both productions also share the same producer Johnathon Chik. However, it is not a sequel or prequel and the storyline is completely different from the original War and Beauty.

Ratings report showed that the premiere episode broke the ratings record in recent years with an average of 36 points, which roughly translates to 2.31 million audiences. The second episode also maintained the same ratings. TVB, at the time, was confident the ratings of the series will continue to rise. However, the ratings began to fall flat following the next several weeks. Some believe that the premise of the show, which had two rival families constant bickering with each other, and the desert setting (which constantly produces a monochrome yellow color that was dramatically enhanced in Post-Production on TV), made the show somewhat tiresome. However, the ratings for all episodes were above 30 points, remarkable in Hong Kong standards.

== Viewership ratings ==
	Week	Episode	Average Points	Peaking Points	References
1	May 1–5, 2006	1 — 5	34	36	
2	May 8–12, 2006	6 — 10	33	35	
3	May 15–19, 2006	11 — 15	31	—	
4	May 22–26, 2006	16 — 20	32	33	
5	May 29 - June 2, 2006	21 — 25	30	32	
6	June 5–9, 2006	26 — 30	31	34	
7	June 12, 2006	31 — 32	35	38	

== Awards and nominations ==
=== Awards ===
39th TVB Anniversary Awards (2006)

- "Best Actor in a Supporting Role" (Kenny Wong - Sung Tung-Yeung)

=== Nominations ===
39th TVB Anniversary Awards (2006)

- Nominated - "Best Drama"
- Nominated - "Best Actor in a Leading Role" (Bowie Lam - Yim Man-Hei)
- Nominated - "Best Actor in a Leading Role" (Moses Chan - Sung Tung-Sing)
- Nominated - "Best Actress in a Leading Role" (Ada Choi - Chiu Yuk)
- Nominated - "Best Actress in a Leading Role" (Charmaine Sheh - Ka Chun-Fun)
- Nominated - "Best Actress in a Leading Role" (Gigi Lai - Kai Ming-Fung)
- Nominated - "Best Actor in a Supporting Role" (Chung King Fai - Yim Kwok-Yip)
- Nominated - "Best Actor in a Supporting Role" (Kenny Wong - Sung Tung-Yeung)
- Nominated - "Best Actor in a Supporting Role" (Chan Hung Lit - Mau To)
- Nominated - "Best Actress in a Supporting Role" (Catherine Chau - Mau Siu-Kam)
- Nominated - "Best Actress in a Supporting Role" (Helen Ma - Gwai Lan)
- Nominated - "My Favourite Male Character Role" (Bowie Lam - Yim Man-Hei)
- Nominated - "My Favourite Male Character Role" (Moses Chan - Sung Tung-Sing)
- Nominated - "My Favourite Male Character Role" (Chung King Fai - Yim Kwok-Yip)
- Nominated - "My Favourite Male Character Role" (Kenny Wong - Sung Tung-Yeung)
- Nominated - "My Favourite Female Character Role" (Ada Choi - Chiu Yuk)
- Nominated - "My Favourite Female Character Role" (Charmaine Sheh - Ka Chun-Fun)
- Nominated - "My Favourite Female Character Role" (Gigi Lai - Kai Ming-Fung)
