= Lady Fan =

Hong Kong television series

- 烽火奇遇結良緣
- Genre: Costume drama
- Starring: Jessica Hsuan; Joe Ma
- Opening theme: Fung Chui Bat Zau Siu Yung (風吹不走笑容) performed by Candy Lo
- Country of origin: Hong Kong
- Original language: Cantonese
- No. of episodes: 20

Production
- Running time: 45 minutes per episode

Original release
- Network: TVB
- Release: February 9 – March 5, 2004

Lady Fan
- Traditional Chinese: 烽火奇遇結良緣
- Simplified Chinese: 烽火奇遇结良缘
Transcriptions
Yue: Cantonese
- Jyutping: Fung1 Fo2 Kei4 Jyu6 Git3 Loeng4 Jyun4

Lady Fan is a Hong Kong television series starring Jessica Hsuan as the lady warrior Fan Lei-fa (Fan Lihua) and Joe Ma as Sit Ding-san (Xue Dingshan). The series was first aired on TVB in 2004. The plot is an adaptation of an earlier TVB production, General Father, General Son.

== Plot ==
The story is set during a time when the Tang dynasty was at war. Lei Fa is the daughter of a respected Sai Leung general. Her mother died when she was young, so she has been raised by her father and brothers and developed a forthright, outspoken personality as a result. Her martial arts master, the Holy Mother of Lei Mountain, tells her that she is destined to marry a Tang citizen and their marriage will unite the two kingdoms and bring about a time of peace and harmony.

Unfortunately for her, her destined husband turns out to be Sit Ding San. His father is Sit Yan Kwai, a renowned and loyal general of the Tang dynasty. The Sit family is very prejudiced against Sai Leung citizens, as they have long been at war against each other. The show follows Lei Fa as she wins Ding San's love, his family's affections and the respect and loyalty of the Tang troops.

== Cast ==
- Jessica Hsuan as Fan Lei Fa 樊梨花
- Law Lok Lam as Fan Hung 樊洪
- Edward Mok as Fan Wei 樊威
- Wai Ka Hung as Fan Mo 樊武
- Joe Ma as Sit Ding San 薛丁山
- Bill Chan as Sit Yan Kwai 薛仁貴
- Cherie Kong as Chan Kam Ding 陳金定
- Power Chan as Sit Ying Lung 薛應龍
- Cindy Au as Sit Kam Lin 薛金蓮
- Mimi Lo as Dou Sin Tong 竇仙童
- Chun Wong as Ching Ngau Kam 程咬金
- Ching Hor Wai as Lau Kam Fa 柳金花
- Dickson Lee as Bo Yut Fu 竇一虎
- Suet Nei as Lei San Sing Mo 梨山聖母 (Fan Lei Fa's Teacher)
- Lau Kong as Chan Fu 陳父
- Kong Hon as Lee Do Chung 李道宗
- Liu Kai Chi as Li Sai Man 李世民
- Deno Cheung as Lord So Lak 疏勒藩主
- Yvonne Ho as Dai To Po 大肚婆
- Hoffman Cheng as a guard
