= 2006 Astro Wah Lai Toi Drama Awards =

- Date: 20 January 2007
- Location: Arena of Stars

Television/radio coverage
- Network: Astro Wah Lai Toi
- Produced by: Astro, TVB

The 2006 Astro Wah Lai Toi Drama Awards (simplified Chinese: Astro华丽台电视剧大奖2006; traditional Chinese: Astro華麗臺電視劇大獎2006), presented by Astro in Malaysia, was an awards ceremony that recognised the best Hong Kong television programmes that aired on Malaysia's Astro Wah Lai Toi in 2006. The ceremony was televised live on Astro's Cantonese channel, Astro Wah Lai Toi.

The ceremony took place on 20 January 2007 at the Arena of Stars in Genting Highlands, Pahang, Malaysia. Winners were 100% based on results through popular voting, which commenced on 16 December 2006. Wars of In-Laws was the night's biggest winner, taking home five awards including My Favourite Drama and My Favourite Actress.

== Winners and nominees ==
Top five nominees are in bold.

My Favourite Actor in a Leading Role	My Favourite Actress in a Leading Role
**Moses Chan as Shui Tung-lau in The Gentle Crackdown**; **Julian Cheung as Ha Chung-yum in Shades of Truth**; **Kevin Cheng as Chan Ka-lok in Yummy Yummy**; **Bosco Wong as Ling Mau-chun in Wars of In-Laws**; **Ron Ng as Wong Kai-kit in Revolving Doors of Vengeance**; Adam Cheng as Ko Shing in The Prince's Shadow; Nick Cheung as Wong Po-fun in The Last Breakthrough; Bowie Lam as Henry Lai in Healing Hands III; Lawrence Ng as Paul Ching in Healing Hands III; Raymond Lam as Ken Chai in The Last Breakthrough	**Myolie Wu as Tin Lik in Wars of In-Laws**; **Maggie Cheung Ho-yee as Lui Chi in The Conqueror's Story**; **Charmaine Sheh as Mandy Chow in Yummy Yummy**; **Liza Wang as Hitara Sheok-lan in Wars of In-Laws**; **Kenix Kwok as Becky Ku in Revolving Doors of Vengeance**; Sonija Kwok as Hong Kiu in The Last Breakthrough; Bernice Liu as Kei Mei-lai in Love Bond; Niki Chow as Sap Yi-mui in The Gentle Crackdown; Louisa So as Yen Ting in Misleading Track; Gigi Lai as Frances Shum in Healing Hands III
My Favourite Drama	My Top 12 Favourite Characters
**Wars of In-Laws**; The Last Breakthrough; The Conqueror's Story; Healing Hands III; Revolving Doors of Vengeance	Raymond Lam as Daniel Yau in Yummy Yummy; Charmaine Sheh as Mandy Chow in Yummy Yummy; Kevin Cheng as Chan Ka-lok in Yummy Yummy; Julian Cheung as Ha Chung-yum in Shades of Truth; Moses Chan as Sit Shui / Lam Sam-hor in Love Bond; Bernice Liu as Kei Mei-lai in Love Bond; Nick Cheung as Wong Po-fun in The Last Breakthrough; Sonija Kwok as Hong Kiu in The Last Breakthrough; Roger Kwok as Tang Lai-cheung in Scavengers' Paradise; Ron Ng as Wong Kai-kit in Revolving Doors of Vengeance; Myolie Wu as Tin Lik in Wars of In-Laws; Bosco Wong as Ling Mau-chun in Wars of In-Laws
My Favourite Drama Theme Song	My Favourite On-Screen Couple
**"Heart's Breath" (心呼吸) by Raymond Lam — The Last Breakthrough**; "Opening Ceremony" (开学礼) by Hacken Lee — Shine On You; "Together with Friends" (与朋友共) by Raymond Lam and Kevin Cheng — Yummy Yummy; "Truth" (实情) by Bernice Liu — Into Thin Air; "Scheming Heart" (心计) by Hacken Lee — Revolving Doors of Vengeance	**Bernice Liu and Moses Chan in Love Bond**; Leila Tong and Raymond Lam in The Last Breakthrough; Niki Chow and Moses Chan in The Gentle Crackdown; Maggie Shiu and Raymond Cho in Healing Hands III; Myolie Wu and Bosco Wong in Wars of In-Laws
My Favourite Supporting Character	My Favourite Extreme Appearance
**Raymond Cho as Chris Heung in Healing Hands III**; Gordon Liu as Wong Kam-yan in Shades of Truth; Wayne Lai as Hon Sun in The Conqueror's Story; Johnson Lee as Kot Tak-wan in Just Love; Li Fung as Kuk Kei in The Gateau Affairs	**Bosco Wong as "strange baby" Ling Mau-chun in Wars of In-Laws**; Roger Kwok as "auntie" Tang Wai-cheung in Scavengers' Paradise; Moses Chan as "king of the dead" Shui Tung-lau in The Gentle Crackdown; Li Fung as "Marilyn Monroe" Kuk Kei in The Gateau Affairs; Myolie Wu as "big mole" Tin Lik in Wars of In-Laws
My Most Unforgettable Scene	
**Frances' tears after identifying Edmond's corpse— Gigi Lai in Healing Hands III**; The death of Eva — The Last Breakthrough; Sit-shui and Mei-lai — Love Bond; Kong Fai's piano tribute to his mother — Into Thin Air; Saving Nameless — Wars of In-Laws	
