= Healing Hands =

Healing Hands may refer to:

== Film and television ==
- Healing Hands (TV series), a Hong Kong TV series made by TVB Jade, 1998
  - Healing Hands II, a Hong Kong TV series by TVB, following on from Healing Hands, 2000
  - Healing Hands III, a Hong Kong TV series by TVB, following on from Healing Hands and Healing Hands II, 2005
- "Healing Hands" (Frankie Drake Mysteries), a 2017 television episode

== Music ==
- "Healing Hands" (Elton John song), a song by Elton John, from Sleeping with the Past, 1989
- "Healing Hands" (Conrad Sewell song), a song by Conrad Sewell, from "Ghosts & Heartaches", 2018
- "Healing Hands", a song by Ian Moss, from Worlds Away, 1991
- "Healing Hands", a song by Marc Cohn, from, Burning the Daze, 1998
- "Healing Hands", a song by Don Williams, from Reflections, 2011

== See also ==
- Laying on of hands, a religious ritual
- Healing Hands of Time, a 1994 album by Willie Nelson
