= Po Ju =

Po Ju (Chinese: 破局; pinyin: Pò Jú) may refer to:

- Caught in Trap, 2014 Chinese film
- Peace Breaker (film), 2017 Chinese film
