= Michael Tong =

Hong Kong actor

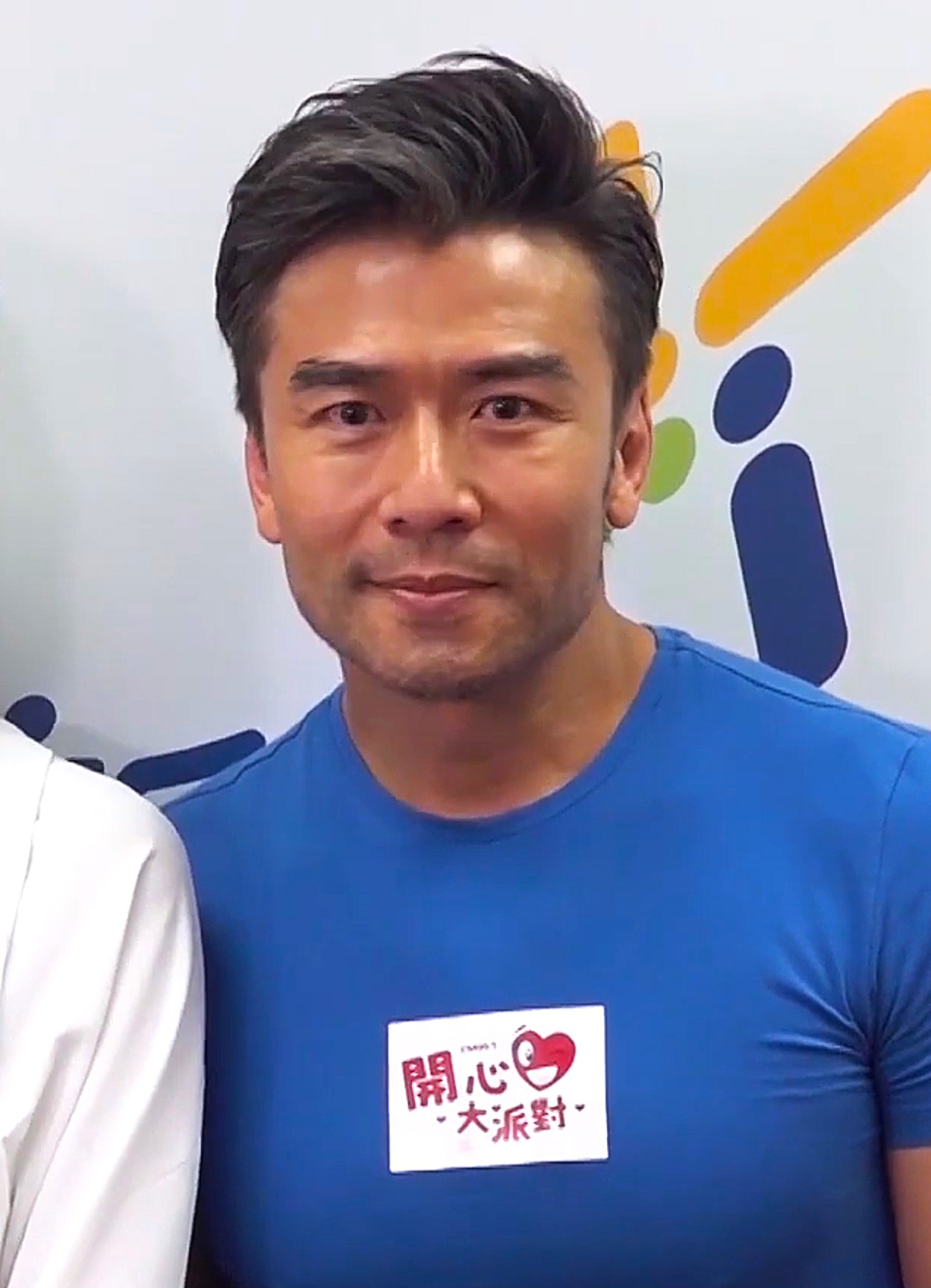
- Tong in 2020
- Born: British Hong Kong

Chinese name
- Traditional Chinese: 唐文龍
Transcriptions
Standard Mandarin
- Hanyu Pinyin: Táng Wénlóng

Michael Tong Man-lung (Chinese: 唐文龍; Cantonese Romanization: Tong Man Lung (Tang Wen Long)) is a Hong Kong actor.

== Filmography ==
=== TV series ===
- Return of the Cuckoo (2000)
- The Kung Fu Master (2000)
- Healing Hands 2 (2000)
- Armed Reaction II (2000)
- In a Realm of Success (2001)
- Family Man (2002)
- Trust of a Lifetime (2002)
- Perish in the Name of Love (2003)
- The 'W' Files (2003)
- Riches and Stitches (2003)
- Healing Hands 3 (2004)
- Hard Fate (2004)
- To Catch the Uncatchable (2004)
- The Biter Bitten (2006)
- Flaming Butterfly (2008) (ATV)
- Heart and Greed (2017)
- Night Beauties (2023)

=== Films ===
- Hero of City (2001)
- Troublesome Night 18 (2003)
- Seamy Side of Life II - Crying Stars (2003)
- Unplugging Nightmare (2004)
- Magic Kitchen (2004)
- Man of Tai Chi (2013)
- Firestorm (2013)
- To Love Somebody (2014)
- Tomb Robber (2014)
- Be Together (2015)
- Scary Road Is Fun (2015)
- Return of the Cuckoo (2015)
- Shock Wave (2017)
- Ip Man and Four Kings (2019)
