= Never Dance Alone =

2014 Hong Kong television series

- Official poster
- Also known as: M Club
- 女人俱樂部
- Genre: Modern, inspiration, comedy-drama
- Created by: Hong Kong Television Broadcasts Limited
- Starring: Carman Lee; Rachel Lee; Fennie Yuen; Flora Chan; Gloria Yip; Angie Cheong; Elvina Kong; Lawrence Ng; Lawrence Cheng; Eliza Sam
- Opening theme: 星斗群 by Shirley Kwan & Mag Lam
- Ending theme: Let's Dance by Anjaylia Chan, Cheronna Ng, Winki Lai, Venus Wong, Kandy Wong & Annice Ng; Girls Just Wanna Have Fun by Cyndi Lauper
- Country of origin: Hong Kong
- Original language: Cantonese
- No. of episodes: 32

Production
- Producers: Joe Chan; Eric Tsang
- Camera setup: Multi camera
- Running time: 45 minutes
- Production company: TVB

Original release
- Network: Jade; HD Jade
- Release: 21 April – 1 June 2014

Related
- Ruse of Engagement; The Ultimate Addiction

Never Dance Alone:
- Traditional Chinese: 女人俱樂部
- Simplified Chinese: 女人俱乐部
- Literal meaning: Ladies Club
Transcriptions
Standard Mandarin
- Hanyu Pinyin: nǚ rén jù lè bù
Yue: Cantonese
- Jyutping: jyu1 jan4 geoi1 lok6 bou6

Never Dance Alone (Chinese: 女人俱樂部); filmed under the working title "Aerobic Girls" (Chinese: Aerobic Girls 舞室保衛戰), is a Hong Kong television modern inspiration comedy-drama series produced and broadcast by domestic broadcaster TVB in 2014, starring Carman Lee, Rachel Lee, Fennie Yuen, Flora Chan, Gloria Yip, Angie Cheong and Elvina Kong as the main cast. It is a remake of a 2011 South Korean film Sunny.

== Synopsis ==
The series revolves around a group of six women: Siu-Sze, Julie, Akina, Yuen Chau, Jenny, and Cyndi, with regular flashbacks to their secondary school days in mid-1980s Hong Kong. The school is named St. Laurent Girls' Secondary School, a pun on the French designer Yves Saint Laurent (Yves' Chinese name is translated as sing3 lo4 laan4 in Cantonese, which is also a pun on TVB's veteran actress Helena Law Lan.) During their secondary school days, the six women formed a tight-knit dancing group called "M Club", based on the theory of menstrual synchrony, as well as a desire and hope for other "M"s in life in the years to come: good memories, marriage, and wealth (money).

Due to various events, as well as progression in life, the six women drifted away. Before that happened, the group mocked and eventually kicked out another woman: Diana, who then went on to hold a grudge against the rest of M Club.

Over two decades after their graduation, the women lead different lives. Siu-Sze is a housewife, as well as Akina. Yuen Chau works for the Hong Kong Government, while having an affair with a prospective chief executive candidate who is also her boss. Jenny initially worked as an airline hostess, but eventually quit to care for her mother, who suffered a stroke. Julie became obsessed with money, and was set to marry the son of a wealthy New Territories tribal elder until she discovered he is gay. Meanwhile, Cyndi continued with her passion for dancing, and operates a dance studio that is ailing.

Through happenstance, Cyndi reunited with Julie and Siu-Sze, and managed to bring the entire M Club back together through a stint at a psychiatric hospital, with Siu-Sze and others reuniting to help preserve Cyndi's dance studio. This helped the women rediscover their dream, as well as their purpose in life.

== Production ==
Great effort was made in recruiting the two main casts: the modern cast, as well as their counterpart during the characters' secondary school days. TV host Eric Tsang, who produced the series in his producer debut, used his personal connections to assemble a cast of former TVB artists for the modern cast, most of whom have not appeared in a TVB series for a long time. The younger cast was matched for physical resemblance and the ability to portray the characters during their secondary school days. One of the filming locations of the series is New Asia Middle School.

== Cast ==
=== Main characters ===
- Carman Lee as Mo Siu-Sze
  - Anjaylia Chan as teenage Siu-Sze
- Rachel Lee as Julie Chu Li
  - Venus Wong as teenage Julie
- Fennie Yuen as Luk Yuen-Chau
  - Cheronna Ng as teenage Yuen-Chau
- Flora Chan as Diana Yung Dan-Dan
  - Jeannie Chan as teenage Diana
- Gloria Yip as Akina Leung Kam-Yin
  - Kandy Wong as teenage Akina
- Angie Cheong as Jenny Hui Chun-Nei
  - Winki Lai as teenage Jenny
- Elvina Kong as Cyndi Law Fung-Sin
  - Annice Ng as teenage Cyndi
- Lawrence Ng as Alan Yiu Tsz-Lun, Diana's ex-husband.
  - Matthew Ho as teenage Alan

=== Other characters ===
==== Siu Sze's family ====
- Lawrence Cheng as Wong Kwok-Leung, Siu-Sze's husband
- Heidi Lee as Wong Ho, Siu-Sze's daughter
- Miu Gam Fung as Wong Chiu Wing Mui, Siu-Sze's mother-in-law
- David Lo as Mo Wah, Siu-Sze and Chi-kin’s father
- Steven Cheung as Mo Chi-Kin, Siu-Sze's little brother and Carrie Tong's boyfriend
- Babe Tree (actress/songwriter) as Daisy, the funny yet sarcastic Domestic Helper of the family.

==== Julie's Family ====
- Eliza Sam as Carrie Tong, originally named "Lorelei" and Julie's biological daughter, but estranged shortly after her birth.
- Joe Cheng as Robert Poon, Julie's husband and Carrie's biological father
  - Amigo Choi as teenage Robert Poon
- Pal Sinn as Lek Lek, Julie's ex-fiance.
- King Kong Lee as Tim, Lek Lek's assistant and lover.

==== Jenny's Family ====
- Rosanne Lui as Hui Sin, Jenny's mother
- Luk Wing from FAMA as Fok Gam Fai, Jenny's boyfriend

=== Miscellaneous characters ===
- Koo Ming-wah as Yue Dai Hung, Akina’s husband.
- Koni Lui as Mandy, Diana’s assistant.
- Anderson Junior as Law Fook-Chuen, Cyndi's half-brother.
  - Dolby Kwan as teenage Law Fook-Chuen
- Patrick Dunn as LY Lee, Luk Yuen-Chau's supervisor, secret lover, and immediate supervisor. A prospective candidate for Hong Kong's chief executive.
- Lily Poon as Mrs. Lee, LY Lee's legitimate wife.
- Ernesto Maurice Corpus (Ernie) as Benny Aguilar, love interest of Hui Sin
- Alan Wan as Jason, Carrie's friend.
- Brian Burrell as Dr. House, Akina's new boyfriend at the end.
- Eric Tsang as himself, appearing in the finale as a television producer to ask Siu-Sze to write a script for a TV series based on their experience (essentially, a script for Never Dance Alone)

== Viewership ratings ==
Week	Episodes	Date	Average Points	Peaking Points
1	01－05	21–25 April 2014	26	28
2	06－10	28 April – 2 May 2014	24	26
3	11－15	5–9 May 2014	25	28
4	16－20	12–16 May 2014	25	27
5	21－25	19–23 May 2014	26	28
6	26－30	26–30 May 2014	25	27
6	31－32	1 June 2014	27	31

== See also ==
- Sunny (2011 film)
