= Every Move You Make (TV series) =

Hong Kong television series

- Official poster
- 讀心神探
- Genre: Police procedural Drama
- Written by: Sit Ka-wah
- Starring: Bowie Lam; Bosco Wong; Kristal Tin; Aimee Chan; Lai Lok-yi
- Theme music composer: Yip Siu-chung
- Opening theme: Sam Chung Yau So (心中有數) performed by Bowie Lam
- Country of origin: Hong Kong
- Original language: Cantonese
- No. of episodes: 20

Production
- Producer: Tsui Yu-on
- Production location: Hong Kong
- Camera setup: Multi camera
- Running time: 42 minutes
- Production company: TVB

Original release
- Network: TVB Jade
- Release: 4 October – 29 October 2010

Every Move You Make
- Title screen shot
- Traditional Chinese: 讀心神探
- Simplified Chinese: 读心神探
- Literal meaning: The Mind-reading Detective
Transcriptions
Standard Mandarin
- Hanyu Pinyin: Dú Xīn Shén Tàn
Yue: Cantonese
- Jyutping: Duk6 Sam1 San4 Taam3

Every Move You Make (Traditional Chinese title:讀心神探) is a 2010 Hong Kong police procedural television serial drama produced by TVB. The 20-episode drama originally aired five days a week, running from 4 to 29 October 2010 on the TVB Jade channel. In the show, Senior Inspector Linus Yiu (Bowie Lam) and his colleagues of West Kowloon Police Headquarters' CID unit use the Facial Action Coding System, body language study, microexpression interpretations, and applied psychology to solve and assist in criminal investigations. The human's gesture, can be pretended by the cerebrum, but when facing unusual events happening all of a sudden, or being questioned unawares, then the human's gesture will finally tell the truth.

== Synopsis ==
Kowloon West Serious Crime Unit Senior Inspector, Linus Yiu (Bowie Lam) has learnt his mind reading skills overseas. He is efficient and, by far, the most competent cop in his unit. He is able to analyze and read people's minds just by observing their body language, facial expressions and from the tone of voice. In addition, he is also highly skilled when spotting disparities in testimonies and evidence.

However, his teammates find him to be a real pain in the neck. Newcomers, Station Sergeant Phoenix (Kristal Tin) and Sergeant Trevor (Bosco Wong) are especially annoyed by the unconventional way in which he does things. As a result, the pair often has confrontations and misunderstandings with the inspector. Things become worse when Linus learns that his half-sister, Perlie (Aimee Chan) is secretly going out with Trevor, and that Phoenix, who has recently been divorced, has a crush on Linus.

== Cast and characters ==
=== CID team members ===
| Rank | Role | Cast |
|---|---|---|
| Senior Inspector (SIP) | Linus Yiu | Bowie Lam |
| Station Sergeant (WSSGT) | Phoenix Yip | Kristal Tin |
| Sergeant (SGT) | Trevor Ho | Bosco Wong |
| Police Constable (PC) | Mak Wing-hei | Lai Lok-yi |
| Police Constable (WPC) | Wu Hau-ying | Lorretta Chow |
| Police Constable (PC) | Kan Ho-ming | Jack Hui |

=== Supporting characters ===
- Perlie Ching, portrayed by Aimee Chan, is Linus' younger half-sister.
- Chung Sau-han, portrayed by Susan Tse, is Linus and Perlie's biological mother.
- Ching Shiu-hong, portrayed by Yu Yang, is the youngest son of the Ching family, Sau-han's husband, Perlie's biological father and Linus' stepfather.

=== Recurring characters ===
- Ching Shiu-on, portrayed by Lau Kong is the eldest son of the Ching family.
- Lo Sui-heung, portrayed by Alice Fung So-bor is Siu-on's wife.
- Ching Yin-ha, portrayed by Helen Ma, is the eldest daughter of the Ching family.
- Ching Yin-ping, portrayed by Manna Chan, is the youngest daughter of the Ching family.

== Awards and nominations ==
TVB Anniversary Awards (2010)

- Nominated: Best Drama (Top 5)
- Nominated: Best Actor (Bowie Lam)

== Viewership ratings ==
| | Week | Episodes | Average Points | Peaking Points | References |
|---|---|---|---|---|---|
| 1 | October 4–8, 2010 | 1 — 5 | 29 | 30 | |
| 2 | October 11–15, 2010 | 6 — 10 | 29 | 32 | |
| 3 | October 18–22, 2010 | 11 — 15 | 31 | 34 | |
| 4 | October 25–29, 2010 | 16 — 20 | 32 | 36 | |
