= Sebastian Poon =

- Born: 30 May 1978 (age 48); Hong Kong
- Occupations: Guitarist, songwriter, lyricist, music producer
- Years active: 2008–present
- Spouse: Miu Ka-ming (m. 2013)

Chinese name
- Traditional Chinese: 潘雲峰
- Simplified Chinese: 潘云峰
Transcriptions
Standard Mandarin
- Hanyu Pinyin: Pān Yúnfēng
Yue: Cantonese
- Jyutping: Pun^{1} Wan^{4} Fung^{1}
- Musical career
- Instrument: Guitar
- Label: WOW Music

Sebastian Poon Wan-fung (born 30 May 1978), also known as his stage name "Tong Hing", is the guitarist and songwriter of the Hong Kong-based band Sugar Club.

== Biography ==
Sebastian Poon worked as a computer cartographer and guitar teacher before signing WOW Music. In 2007, Sebastian decided to form the band Sugar Club with Kandy Wong, who was introduced by his friend. Later, Sugar Club gained the opportunity to perform at Langham Place The Mall every week, until December, 2010.

In 2008, Sugar Club's performance was admired by WOW Music and they were signed to the record label at the same year. On 30 December 2010, they released their debut album I Love Sugar Club Best.

In 2011, Sebastian proposed to his girlfriend Jessie on the first big concert of Sugar Club, and held their wedding ceremony in April, 2013.

In addition to the songs for Sugar Club, Sebastian also writes songs for other singers including Jason Chan, Dicky Cheung, etc.

== Filmography ==
=== Television dramas ===
Title	Chinese title	Year	Role	Notes
Dropping By Cloud Nine	你們我們他們	2011	Referee	

=== Films ===
Title	Chinese title	Year	Role	Notes
The Way We Dance	狂舞派	2013	Presenter	
