= Kandy Wong =

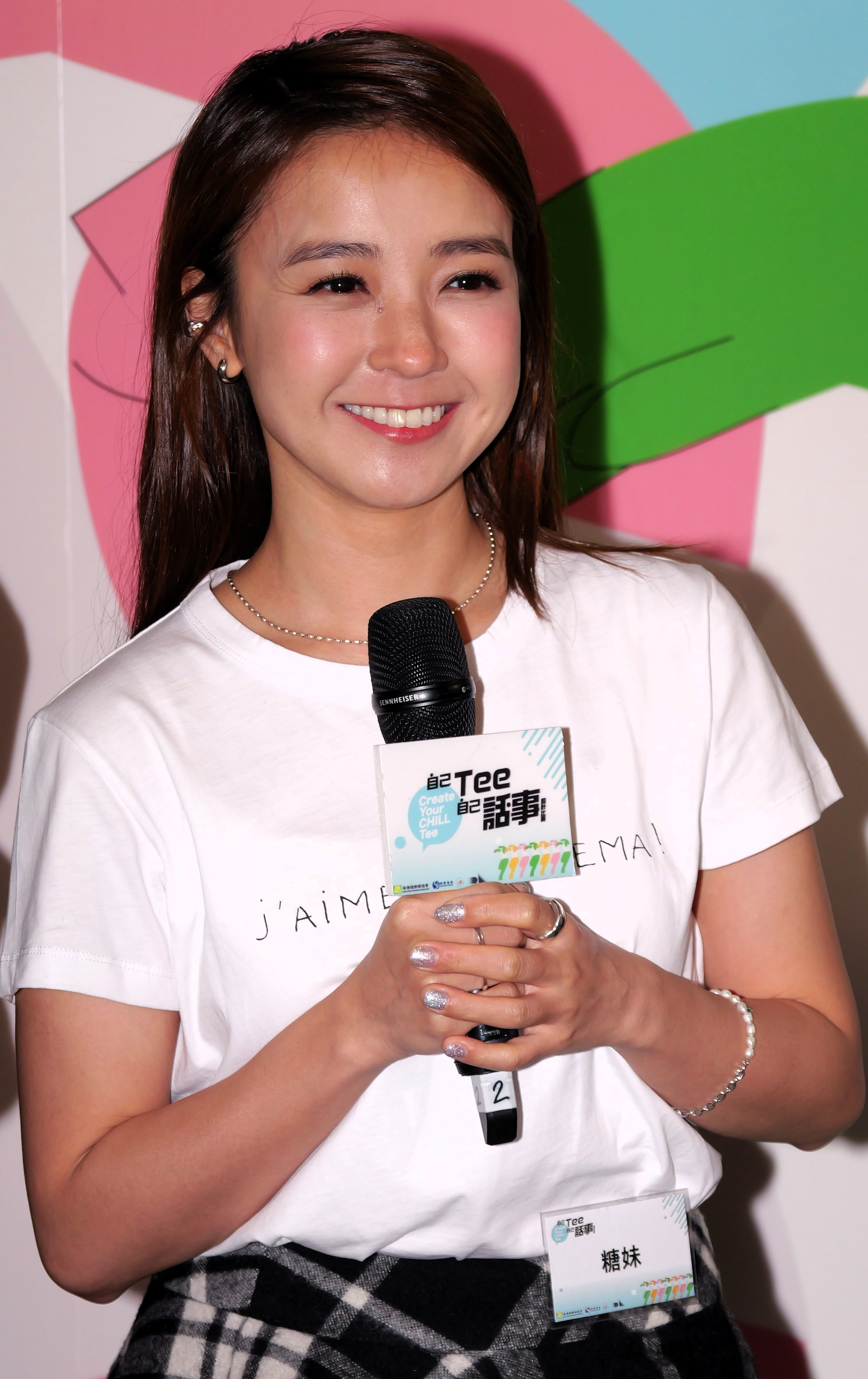
- Wong in 2024
- Born: 黃麗怡（Wong Lai-yee） 16 October 1987 (age 38); British Hong Kong
- Occupations: Singer, actress, lyricist, presenter
- Years active: 2008–present

Chinese name
- Traditional Chinese: 黃山怡
- Simplified Chinese: 黄山怡
Transcriptions
Standard Mandarin
- Hanyu Pinyin: Huáng Shānyí
Yue: Cantonese
- Jyutping: Wong^{4} Saan^{1} Ji^{4}
- Musical career
- Label: WOW Music

Kandy Wong Shan-yee (born 16 October 1987), also known as her stage name "Tong Mui", is the vocal of the Hong Kong-based band Sugar Club, she is regarded as a lookalike for the Cantopop singer Priscilla Chan .

== Biography ==
Kandy Wong was born in Hong Kong. Before rising to fame, she had uploaded a song on the internet with her original name Candy Wong (黃麗怡).

In 2007, Wong decided to form the band Sugar Club with Sebastian Poon, a guitarist and vocal of another band introduced by her friend. Later, Sugar Club gained the opportunity to perform at the Langham Place The Mall every week, until the end of 2010.

In 2008, their performance was admired by WOW Music and they were signed to the record label at the same year. On 30 December 2010, they released their debut album I Love Sugar Club Best.

In 2011, Wong was program host with Suki Chui and Janice Ting for the TVB food show My Sweets.

From 2012 til now, Wong has been a part of several television shows and dramas, the most notable one being the music show JSG in 2012 and the drama Season of Love in 2013.

In 2022, Wong's contract with WOW ended.

== Discography ==
- Pink Girls (EP) (2011)

== Filmography ==
=== Television dramas ===
Title	Chinese title	Year	Role	Notes
Dropping By Cloud Nine	你們我們他們	2011	Siu Wan	Unit 1
Season of Love	戀愛季節	2013	Lam Chun-fong	Spring segment
Awfully Lawful	熟男有惑	2013	Tong Tsz-kwan	
Triumph in the Skies II	衝上雲霄II	2013	Alizee Koo	Cameo in episode 30
Never Dance Alone	女人俱樂部	2014	young Akina Leung Kam-yin (Fat Choi)	Younger version of Gloria Yip’s character
Two Steps From Heaven	幕後玩家	2016	Ada Kwan Ching	Major Supporting Role
Line Walker: The Prelude	使徒行者2	2017	Law Siu-sze	Former police communication officer One of the three former police officers that Cheuk Hoi recruited to help him against the corrupt cops
Another Era	誇世代	2017	Annoying customer	Cameo
Daddy Cool	逆緣	2018	Macy Choi Ming-sze	Major Supporting Role
Hong Kong Love Stories	香港愛情故事	2020	Man Ching	Supporting Role
Armed Reaction 2021	陀槍師姐2021	2021	Mrs Kwong	Cameo
Childhood In A Capsule	童時愛上你	2022	Ma Loi-nga	Major Supporting Role
Forensic Heroes V	法證先鋒V	2022	Pang Siu-wei	Supporting Role
Treasure of Destiny	新四十二章	TBA	Muk Hoi-nam	Major Supporting Role

=== Films ===
Title	Chinese title	Year	Notes
Love Is the Only Answer	人約離婚後	2011	
Summer Love Love	戀夏戀夏戀戀下	2011	
Frozen	魔雪奇緣	2013	Dubbing as Anna Cantonese version
When Love Encounters	兩情相遇	2013	Micro film 2013 Hong Kong Asian Film Festival
Frozen II	魔雪奇緣2	2019	Dubbing as Anna Cantonese version
