= Family Man (Hong Kong TV series) =

2002 Hong Kong television series

- Promo poster
- 絕世好爸
- Genre: Modern Drama, Romance, Comedy
- Created by: Hong Kong Television Broadcasts Limited
- Starring: Paul Chun; Flora Chan; Moses Chan; Sonija Kwok; Michael Tong; Jay Lau; Edmond So; Myolie Wu
- Opening theme: Warmth "暖流" by Flora Chan & William So
- Ending theme: Clay Figure "泥公仔" by Flora Chan; Fated Person "有緣人" by Flora Chan
- Country of origin: Hong Kong
- Original language: Cantonese
- No. of episodes: 20

Production
- Producer: Mui Siu-ching
- Running time: 45 minutes (approx.)

Original release
- Network: TVB Jade
- Release: 14 October – 9 November 2002

Family Man
- Chinese: 絕世好爸
- Simplified Chinese: 绝世好爸
- Literal meaning: "Best Dad Ever"
Transcriptions
Standard Mandarin
- Hanyu Pinyin: jué shì hǎo bà
Yue: Cantonese
- Jyutping: zyut3 sai3 hou2 baa1

Family Man i(Chinese: 絕世好爸; Jyutping: zyut3 sai3 hou2 baa1; literally "Best Dad Eve") is a 2002 Hong Kong romantic comedy television drama created and produced by TVB, starring Paul Chun, Flora Chan, Moses Chan, Sonija Kwok, Michael Tong, Jay Lau, Edmond So and Myolie Wu as the main cast. First original broadcast began on October 14, 2002 TVB Jade weeknights during its 8:00 to 9:00 pm timeslot.

The series earned Flora Chan her first Best Actress award at the annual TVB Anniversary Awards.

== Synopsis ==
Ko Hoi (Paul Chun) is a widower who raised his four daughters alone. He is also a retired police officer who still participates as a saxophonist in the policeman band. Besides being a devoted father who still cares for his daughters, he is constantly worried about their lives, romances, and happiness. The oldest daughter, Wasabi Ko Yuk Yee (Jay Lau), works as a facial specialist at a spa. She is unreasonable and quick tempered besides being the only daughter that is married. She and her husband Wong Jun Kit (Edmond So) constantly argue due to Wasabi's paranoia to keep tabs on him, but he loves her nonetheless and obeys her every rule. Second daughter Tracy Ko Pui Yee (Flora Chan) is a toy designer and workaholic. She has been dating her business partner Ken Hui Sing Chi (Savio Tsang), who co-owns a toy company with her, for many years which leads to Hoi constantly pushing the two to get married. But due to Ken's ambition to build their company he continues to put off marriage. Third daughter Bobo Ko Bo Yee (Sonija Kwok) has extremely high standards for a potential boyfriend. Due to her pickiness her relationships never last long. She is a journalist who is known to write articles without holding back and doesn't care who she offends, earning her the nickname "firecracker" from her colleagues. Lastly, the youngest daughter Polly Ko Chui Yee (Myolie Wu) is a college senior. She lives a carefree life. Being cute and pretty she constantly courted by guys.

Tracy's meets Ken's cousin Kelvin Siu Hin Wah (Moses Chan) when he invest in their company and become a shareholder. Suddenly Ken disappears when the company is in financial troubles. During this time Kelvin and his friend Dai Gwong Ming (Michael Tong) gets evicted from their apartment and end up moving into an apartment across from the Ko family. The Ko sisters are not happy with the arrangement since it would mean they will have to see them more often than they wanted. Kelvin initially tries to back out of his share of the toy company to avoid paying off any debt the toy company has occurred. However, seeing it as a loss for him if he walks away, he eventually works with Tracy, the two accomplishes on putting the company back on track when they get a contract in a business deal. Working together closely, the two eventually develop respect and feelings for each other. But suddenly Ken comes back.

Bobo and Ming also coincidentally work at the same news press. The two do not get along at first since Ming is Bobo's nemesis, but the two eventually become friends because of their shared hatred for her nemesis and work rival. Ming also eventually falls in love with Bobo after getting close to her but when she gets fired from her job, Kelvin uses his connections to try to get her another job. Seeing Kelvin scramble for her she falls in love with him and confesses her feelings. Kelvin, seeing Ken and Tracy resume their relationship he accepts Bobo's love confession and the two start dating. Ming, who does, is heartbroken but does not want to interfere on Kelvin and Bobo's newfound relationship keeps his feelings for Bobo quiet. However, Polly, who has a crush on Ming, starts hanging around him, but Ming makes it clear that he is not interested in her.

Meanwhile, Wasabi and Kit's marriage are on the rocks due to Wasabi's constant nagging that Ken is useless and does not make enough money. The two eventually separate, and during this time Kit meets and starts dating a woman who seems like the perfect girlfriend. Kit soon finds out that the woman he is dating is possessive and mentally unstable. She pushes Kit to divorce Wasabi or else she will hurt him or Wasabi.

== Cast ==
=== Ko family ===
- Paul Chun as Ko Hoi 高開 (father/巴爸)
- Jay Lau as Wasabi Ko Yuk Yee 高玉怡 (oldest sister - "Dai Mui"/大妹)
- Flora Chan as Tracy Ko Pui Yee 高珮怡 (2nd sister - "Yee Mui"/二妹)
- Sonija Kwok as Bobo Ko Bo Yee 高寶怡 (3rd sister - "Sam Mui"/三妹)
- Myolie Wu as Polly Ko Chui Yee 高翠怡 (youngest sister - "Sai Mui"/細妹)
- Edmond So as Wong Jun Kit 王俊杰 ("Kit Lo"/杰佬)

=== Extended ===
- Moses Chan as Kelvin Siu Hin Wah 蕭顯華
- Michael Tong as Dai Gwong Ming 戴光明
- Savio Tsang as Ken Hui Sing Chi 許承志
- Tim Cheng as Nick Lui Lik 雷力
- Eileen Yeow as Nancy
- Gregory Charles Rivers as Pierre
- Candy Chiu as Tam Siu Ling 譚小紅
- Chan On Ying as Sa
- Joe Junior as uncle Choi 財叔
- Rosanne Lui as Chiu Chan Suk Yee 趙陳淑儀
- Lily Li as Wendy
- Elton Loo as Dak jie 德哥
- Matt Yeung as Ka Ming 家明
- Lily Liew as mama Chu 珠媽
- Akai Lee as Doctor 醫生
- Karen Lee as Mon
