= Ten Brothers (2007 TV series) =

- 十兄弟
- Genre: Costume Comedy
- Starring: Frankie Lam; Kenix Kwok; Lai Lok-yi; Jason Lam; Jack Wu; Don Li; Nicky Law; Kwok Cheng; Mat Yeung; Russell Cheung; Adam Ip; Jeffrey Wong
- Opening theme: "十指緊扣" by Frankie Lam & Kenix Kwok
- Country of origin: Hong Kong
- Original language: Cantonese
- No. of episodes: 20

Production
- Running time: 45 minutes (approx.)

Original release
- Network: TVB
- Release: February 12 – March 9, 2007

Ten Brothers (Traditional Chinese: 十兄弟) is a TVB costume comedy series released overseas in September 2005 and broadcast on TVB Jade in February 2007.

The series is partially based on the Chinese mythology of the same name.

== Synopsis ==
Chan Dai-Ha (Frankie Lam) sells Chinese desserts and falls in love with a wealthy girl named Gei Hao-Yee (Kenix Kwok). Each time Dai-Ha tries to help Hao-Yee, he does something wrong and angers her instead. One day, Hao-Yee and her servant falls down a hill and he saves them. Without thanking him, she shouts at him and mistakenly drinks the soup with ten magical beans in it. The magical beans make her pregnant. However, due to a law in the town forbidding unmarried pregnancy, the villagers are angry and want her punished. Dai-Ha finds out and explains to the villagers that he is the father, causing a deferral of Hao-Yee's execution.

Dai-Ha brings her to his small home where their ten babies are born. Together, they both raise the children, but soon all the children become adults except for Ten (Jeffrey Wong). The parents were afraid of their adult sons, and abandoned them. The children ran around town causing trouble. Subsequently, Two (Jason Lam) and Three (Jack Wu) are adopted by the evil marshal Man Sai-Hung's (Liu Kai Chi) wife, who did not want her husband to know that their real sons had died. When Dai-Ha sees them he tells Hao-Yee and they both stop the villagers from burning them revealing that she really does care. Though because they are poor, Four (Don Li) and Ten were sold to a circus whose leader was extremely strict and disciplined harshly. Nine (Adam Ip) was sold to a richer family. The remaining sons were taught by their mother, and One (Lai Lok-yi), who was the most mature, helped Dai-Ha with his business. One and Four fall in love with the same girl that works at the circus but it turns out she loves One whereas Four believes she should be with him. Meanwhile, Two and Three find out that they are a part of the family because of a mark on their backs they all have and when they try to go back it starts a war. At first it seems pretty even because the brothers have special powers with one disadvantage, limestone which weakens them like the way kryptonite is to Superman.

Hao-Yee's decision earlier on was to help her sons instead of marrying someone else and getting pregnant. In the first place it has caused her father to disown her, but he comes back. Four gives him porridge which he says the secret is keeping the spoon in while it cooks, which is also the same thing Hao-Yee said earlier. While Hao-Yee's father deny's it; they find a painting that he said was of his daughter, one which he had refused to show them, that clearly depicts Hao-Yee. Shortly after they accept each other, Hao-Yee's father catches a disease and is blocked away from other civilizations, like they used to do. As Ten cries over this his tears heal the disease. Hao-Yee points out when he had been stung by bees as a prank gone wrong, he cried out all the poison. So they use Ten to heal everyone with the sickness.

One day, a mysterious white-haired man appears in One's visions and tells him that the brothers will die on the 15th day of the 8th lunar month if they do not leave with him. One did not initially believe him, but did so later. When the parents find out about the prophecy, on the 15th of the 8th lunar month, they sent their children away. But after they have left they see their mother in trouble and all rush back to help her. As they disappear they became ten sparkling stars in the sky. In the future they have their own son who points up to the stars and happily acknowledges them as 'brothers'.

== Cast ==
=== The Ten Brothers ===
Cast	Role	Description
Lai Lok-yi (黎諾懿)	Thousand Mile Eye (千里眼)	Brother One (Ah Dai)
Jason Lam (林遠迎)	Distant Hearing (順風耳)	Brother Two (Ah Yi)
Jack Wu (胡諾言)	Strong Three (大力三)	Brother Three (Ah Sam)
Don Li (李逸朗)	Stretchy Four (奀皮四)	Brother Four (Ah See)
Nicky Law (羅貫峰)	Flying Five (飛天五)	Brother Five (Ah Ng)
Kwok Cheng (郭淨)	Iron Head Six (銅頭六)	Brother Six (Ah Luk)
Mat Yeung (楊明)	Long Legs Seven (高腳七)	Brother Seven (Ah Chi)
Russell Cheung (張智軒)	Digging Eight (遁地八)	Brother Eight (Ah Ba)
Adam Ip (葉暐)	Big Mouth Nine (大口九)	Brother Nine (Ah Kow)
Jeffrey Wong (王秉熹)	Crying Ten (大喊十)	Brother Ten (Ah Sup)
Wai AI.

=== Other characters ===
Cast	Role	Description
Frankie Lam (林文龍)	Chan Dai-Ha (陳大蝦)	Gei Hao-Yee's husband.
Kenix Kwok (郭可盈)	Gei Hao-Yee (紀巧兒)	Chan Dai-Ha's wife.
Leila Tong (唐寧)	Hung Siu-Lan (洪小蘭)	Thousand Mile Eye's lover
Nancy Wu (胡定欣)	Yuen Tung-Tung (阮彤彤)	Strong Three's lover Man Sai-Hung's niece
Henry Lo (魯振順)	Fa Siu Hung (花筱紅)	Acrobatic troupe leader
Liu Kai Chi (廖啟智)	Man Sai-Hung (萬世雄)	General Villain Yuen Tung-Tung's uncle

== Controversy of finale ==
In the series finale, actor Felix Lok ad-libbed one of his lines, and replaced one of the words in the line with a corresponding English one. Although code-switching has been very common in Hong Kong as of the last 10–20 years, such practice is unheard of for the time period of the drama, and, in most circumstances, unlikely, considering the historically non-existent knowledge of English for the characters. TVB was ridiculed by the public for allowing such a slip up.

== Viewership ratings ==
	Week	Episode	Average Points	Peaking Points	References
1	February 12–16, 2007	1 — 5	29	34	
2	February 19–23, 2007	6 — 10	27	32	
3	February 26 - March 2, 2007	11 — 15	34	37	
4	March 5–9, 2007	16 — 20	36	39	

== Awards and nominations ==
40th TVB Anniversary Awards (2007)

- "Best Drama"
- "Best Actor in a Supporting Role" (Jack Wu - Dai Lik-Sam)

== See also ==
- Ten Brothers
