= Ada Choi =

Hong Kong actress (born 1973)

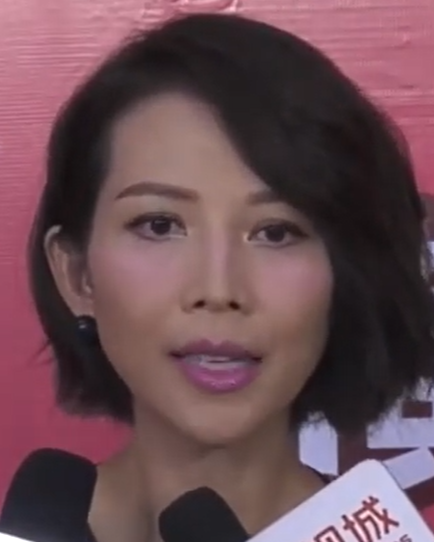
- Choi in April 2019
- Born: 17 September 1973 (age 53); Hong Kong
- Spouse: Zhang Jin (m. 2008)
- Children: 3
- Awards: TVB Anniversary Awards – Best Actress; 1998 Secret of the Heart; My Favorite On-Screen Partners (Dramas); 1998 Healing Hands; 2001 Healing Hands II; 2004 To Catch the Uncatchable; My Favourite Television Character; 2001 Armed Reaction III; 2002 Where the Legend Begins; 2004 To Catch the Uncatchable

Chinese name
- Chinese: 蔡少芬
Transcriptions
Standard Mandarin
- Hanyu Pinyin: Cài Shàofēn
Yue: Cantonese
- Jyutping: Coi3 Siu2-fan1

Ada Choi Siu-fan (Chinese and Cantonese; 蔡少芬; born 17 September 1973) is a Hong Kong actress. She gained recognition with films, such as Hail the Judge (1994) and A Chinese Odyssey Part Two - Cinderella (1995), and rose to prominence with TVB dramas, such as Healing Hands (1998–2000) and Where the Legend Begins (2002). She shifted her career to mainland China in the 2010s, where she found success with Empresses in the Palace (2012).

== Career ==
Choi was born in 1973 in Hong Kong to a Chaoshanese family. Her parents divorced when she was five years old. She speaks Cantonese, Mandarin, Teochew and English. In 1989, at the persuasion of her family, Choi participated in a modeling contest held by TVB at age 15. Two years later, she was a contestant in the 1991 Miss Hong Kong beauty pageant. During the semi-finals she placed first with an overall score of 483. She eventually finished as the second runner-up during the finals. As a result, she signed a contract with TVB and starting taking on acting jobs. She won the TVB Anniversary Award for Best Actress for her performance in Secret of the Heart (1998). Along with Maggie Cheung Ho-yee, Kenix Kwok, Flora Chan and Jessica Hsuan, Choi is known as one of the Top 5 "Fa Dans" (term used for actresses with high popularity) of TVB from the mid-1990s to mid-2000s.

Followed by a stalled career and limited earnings at TVB, Choi shifted her focus to mainland China in the 2010s, where she found success with the costume drama Empresses in the Palace (2012). Since then, she appeared mainly in variety and reality shows, such as Up Idol (2015), Run for Time (2015), My Dearest Ladies (2019) and Viva La Romance (2020).

== Personal life ==
On 12 January 2008, Choi married Chinese actor Zhang Jin, whom she had dated for more than four years. He was her co-star in a number of Zhouyi Media television productions including The Legend of Magic Mirror (2003) and Eight Charts (2005). They have two daughters, Zoe and Chloe, born in 2011 and 2013 respectively. In 2019, they announced on social media that they were expecting their third child. They welcomed their son, Joey Zhang Le'er aka Yudan in November 2019.

== Filmography and awards ==
=== Television ===
Year	Title	Role
1992	Revelation of the Last Hero	Ling Seung
1993	Racing Peak	Chung Oi Ling
1993	All About Tin	Gu Suet
1993	The Link	Chai Suet Yi
1993	The Buddhism Palm Strikes Back	Tin Heung
1993	The Movie About Stupid Mr. Lee	Fat Jak Fong
1993	Man of Wisdom	Seung Seung
1994	Shade of Darkness	Lo Siu Mei
1995	The Romance of the White Hair Maiden	Lin Ngai-seung
1995	Justice Pao	Mang Yu Yik / Suen Siu Nga
1995	The Fist of Law	Fa Gu
1997	File of Justice V	Lee Tung
1998	Healing Hands	Jackie Tong Chi Lai
1998	Secret of the Heart	Diana Suen Wah
1999	A Matter of Business	Wong Yuk Fan
1999	At the Threshold of An Era	Tin Ning
1999	Unnatural Born Killer	Tse Ngan Giu
2000	Healing Hands II	Jackie Tong Chi Lai
2000	At the Threshold of An Era II	Tin Ning
2001	Armed Reaction III	Wai Ying Chi
2001	On the Track or Off	Luk Wing Yee
2002	Where the Legend Begins	Yan Fuk
2003	Fate Twisters	Sheung Hei
2003	The Legend of Magic Mirror (水月洞天)	Dou Dou (豆豆)
2003	The Legend of Magic Mirror II	Dou Dou
2004	Armed Reaction IV	Wai Ying Chi
2004	To Catch the Uncatchable	Vivian Lee Wai Wai
2005	Seven Swordsmen (七劍下天山)	Flying Red Sash
2005	Eight Charts (八阵图)	Qian Xun
2007	Tian Xian Pei (天仙配)	Fourth Fairy (Guest star)
2008	Lei Hen Jian (淚痕劍	Die Wu (蝶舞/琥珀)
2008-2009	The Gem of Life	Hong Nga-Sze (Jessica)
2010	Fly with Me	Leung Hau-chi (Yvonne) / Janet Bin
2010	Who's the Hero (勝者為王)	Tung Fa-shun (童花順)
2011	Xi Jin Du (西津渡)	Shao Yue'e (邵月娥)
2012	The Legend of Zhen Huan	Empress Xiaojingxian
2012	In Love with Power (山河恋·美人无泪)	Empress Xiaoduanwen
2013	Beauty at War	Bouamukchaai Sheung-ling
2015	Run for Time	Cast Member
2017	Oh My Grad	
2018	Woman in Love	

=== Film ===
Year	Title	Role	Notes
1994	Hail the Judge	Yu Yin	
1994	Fist of Legend	Hua's girlfriend	
1995	A Chinese Odyssey Part Two - Cinderella	Princess Iron Fan	
1995	The Golden Girls	Lulu Shum	
1996	Love and Sex Among the Ruins	Billie	Nominated - Golden Bauhinia Awards for Best Actress
1996	Once Upon a Time in Triad Society 2	Deda	Nominated - Golden Bauhinia Awards for Best Supporting Actress
1996	Bloody Friday	Ada	
1996	Mystery Files	Foo Man Dik	
1997	Passionate Nights		
1997	Walk In	May	
1997	Troublesome Night	Ken's love interest	
1997	Made in Heaven	Lily Wong	
1997	Ah Fai, the Dumb	Jody	
1998	T.H.E. Professionals		
1998	Casino		
1998	The Suspect	Annie Chung	
1998	Your Place or Mine!	Vivian Ng	Nominated - Hong Kong Film Critics Society Awards for Best Actress
1998	Rape Trap	Li Shan-Shan	
1999	The Doctor in Spite of Himself	Don	
1999	My Heart Will Go On		
2000	Paramount Motel	Li Yuk-hing	
2004	The Miracle Box	Dr. Joanna Tse	
2009	Rebellion	Cheung Wah	Nominated - Hong Kong Film Critics Society Awards for Best Actress
2010	Just Another Pandora's Box	Princess Iron Fan	Guest star
2013	My Lucky Star		
2014	Just Another Margin		
2014	One Step Away		
2016	S Storm	Wong Man-ling	
2018	Agent Mr Chan		Guest star
2019	Assassins and the Missing Gold		
2025	Legends of the Condor Heroes: The Gallants	Li Ping	

Awards and achievements
TVB Anniversary Awards
Preceded by Esther Kwan for Lady Flower Fist	Best Actress; 1998 for Secret of the Heart	Succeeded by Jessica Hsuan for Detective Investigation Files IV
Ming Pao Anniversary Awards
Preceded by None	Outstanding Actress in Television; 2001 for Armed Reaction III	Succeeded by Flora Chan for A Case of Misadventure
Preceded by Liza Wang for Wars of In-laws	Outstanding Actress in Television; 2006 for Dance of Passion	Succeeded by Louise Lee for Heart of Greed
Miss Hong Kong
Preceded by Noel Leung 梁小冰	Miss Hong Kong 2nd Runner-Up; 1991	Succeeded by Shirley Cheung 張雪玲
