= When Heaven Burns =

2011 Hong Kong television series

- Promotional poster
- Genre: Suspense drama
- Created by: Jonathan Chik
- Written by: Chow Yuk-ming
- Starring: Bowie Lam; Moses Chan; Kenny Wong; Charmaine Sheh; Angela Tong; Maggie Shiu; Astrid Chan; Elaine Jin; Chan Hung-lit; Queenie Chu
- Opening theme: "天與地" (Heaven and Earth) by Paul Wong
- Ending theme: "年少無知" (Youthful Ignorance) by Bowie Lam, Moses Chan and Kenny Wong
- Composer: Paul Wong
- Country of origin: Hong Kong
- Original languages: Cantonese; Mandarin
- No. of episodes: 30

Production
- Producer: Jonathan Chik
- Running time: 45 minutes
- Production company: TVB

Original release
- Network: TVB Jade, HD Jade
- Release: 21 November 2011 – 1 January 2012

When Heaven Burns
- Traditional Chinese: 天與地
- Simplified Chinese: 天与地
- Literal meaning: "Heaven and Earth"
Transcriptions
Standard Mandarin
- Hanyu Pinyin: Tián Yú Dì
Yue: Cantonese
- Jyutping: Tin1 Jyu2 Dei6

When Heaven Burns is a 2011 Hong Kong television serial produced by TVB and starring Bowie Lam, Moses Chan, Kenny Wong, Charmaine Sheh and Angela Tong. First revealed during TVB's Sales Presentation 2009 in 2008, filming took place in late 2009 to early 2010, with the first episode airing both in Hong Kong and TVB's overseas affiliates and partners on 21 November 2011. On 27 December 2011, the show was blacklisted by the Chinese State Administration of Radio, Film, and Television, making it the first Hong Kong television drama to be censored in mainland China in more than two decades.

Despite being the second lowest-rated TVB drama of 2011, When Heaven Burns gained a strong cult following online and received critical acclaim in Hong Kong, winning Best Drama at the 2012 TVB Anniversary Awards.

== Plot ==
In their youth Joe (Bowie Lam), Angus (Moses Chan), Ronnie (Kenny Wong) and Ka Ming are good friends and bandmates. During a mountaineering trip, the four are stranded on a snowbound mountain and Ka Ming was left gravely injured. This event has a traumatic effect on them; their friendship dynamic; and their relationship with Yan (Charmaine Sheh), Ka Ming's girlfriend; leading the previously close group to go their separate ways and abandon their friendship.

Eighteen years later, Yan who remains haunted by the memory of Ka Ming, leads an unfulfilled and occasionally self-destructive personal life while enjoying success professionally as a jaded but popular radio announcer. Joe, Angus and Ronnie have also forged their own successful professional paths, albeit with drastic changes to their actual personalities and characteristics.

A chance incident reunites them and the group bonded again. Unfortunately, the discovery of Ka Ming's body by police revealed Joe, Angus, and Ronnie's long held dark secret of murder and cannibalism, and their continued psychological manipulation and gaslighting of Yan into believing Ka Ming's death was merely an accident. The fragile ties to each other begin to unravel leading each of them to finally confront their true selves. The resulting conflicts bring permanent changes and tragic consequences to all of them, but also a just resolution to their moral dilemmas in accordance with the life decisions they made.

The poetic, well thought out ending was satisfying and thought-provoking in equal measures regarding topics of whether there exists such a thing as karmic retribution and whether different decisions will lead to different consequences in life or if they will all still lead to the same final outcome: free will vs fate.

Additionally, the series also address the modern Hong Kong public's concerns and anxieties regarding the gloomy political outlook, the social injustices and the increasing disregard of moral values; in the years since its handover back to China.

There are also sharp commentaries on the appalling moral quality of the members of the Legislative Council and the forgetful tendencies of the Hong Kong society as a whole. Emphasis on values such as free will, choice of rights, independent personality, and resistance to hegemony accurately reflects the public's disaffection and thus resonated with younger more politically aware audiences.

== Cast ==
=== The Lau family ===
Cast	Role	Description	Age
Bowie Lam; Ronald Law (youth)	Lau Chun Hung (Joe) 劉俊雄	An accountant/A trade union executive/A Legco candidate A band drummer Ma Wing Yee's husband Au Hoi Ching's love interest, later her lover Yip Chi Yan's admirer Sung Yee Long and Cheng Chun Hin's friend Au Hoi Ching's superior, later lover, finally broke up Yung Cheuk Wah's subordinate, later lover Killed and ate Hui Ka Ming	43
Astrid Chan; Joey Mak (youth)	Ma Wing-yee (Gina) 馬詠儀	A nurse Lau Chun Hung's wife Ivan's mistress, later broke up	41

=== The Yung family ===
Cast	Role	Description	Age
Elaine Jin	Yung Cheuk Wah (Brenda) 翁卓樺	Yung Cheuk Tung's older sister Pointed against Sung Yee Long; Lau Chun Hung's superior, later mistress Died in a car accident in Episode 25	50
Maggie Shiu	Yung Cheuk Tung (Emma) 翁卓桐	Yung Cheuk Wah's younger sister Sung Yee Long's girlfriend turned wife Yip Chi Yan and Cheng Kin Sang's friend Lai Sze Man's love rival	40
Moses Chan; Yeung Chiu Hoi (youth)	Sung Yee Long (Angus) 宋以朗	A securities agent Lau Chun Hung and Cheng Chun Hin's friend Yung Cheuk Tung's boyfriend turned husband Lam Pui Ling's ex-boyfriend, later lover Yip Chi Yan's ex-boyfriend Killed and ate Hui Ka Ming	38

=== The Cheng family ===
Cast	Role	Description	Age
Kenny Wong; Kelvin Leung (youth)	Cheng Chun Hin (Ronnie) 鄭振軒	A former actuary A bass guitarist Yeung Suet Mei's husband Cheng Man-shan and Cheng Man-kei's father Lau Chun Hung, Sung Yee Long and Yung Cheuk Tung's friend Killed and ate Hui Ka Ming	44
Angela Tong	Yeung Suet Mei (Shirley) 楊雪薇	Cheng Chun Hin's wife Cheng Man-shan and Cheng Man-kei's mother Lau Chun Hung's admirer Yip Chi Yan's good friend, later friendship breaks	39
Rachel Poon	Cheng Man-shan (Katie) 鄭文珊	Cheng Chun Hin and Yeung Suet Mei's daughter.	
Yeung Ka Shing	Cheng Man-kei (Frankie) 鄭文基	Cheng Chun Hin and Yeung Suet Mei's son Cheng Man-shan's brother	

=== The Yip family ===
Cast	Role	Description	Age
Yu Tsz Ming	Yip Kwong Loi 葉光來	Yip Chi Yan's father	
Doollou Poon	Cheung Pui Kwan 張珮君	Yip Chi Yan's stepmother	
Charmaine Sheh; Angel Chiang (youth)	Yip Chi Yan (Hazel, Yan) 葉梓恩	DJ; Yip Kwong Loi's daughter Cheung Pui Kwan's stepdaughter Yung Cheuk Tung's friend Hui Ka Ming, Sung Yee Long's ex-girlfriend Arthur's mistress, later broke up Lau Chun Hung, Sung Yee Long and Cheng Chun Hin's friend and love interest	34

=== Workers' Right Protection Association ===
Cast	Role	Description	Age
Lau Dan	Kong Siu Chuen 江兆泉	A trade union leader/A Legco candidate Lau Chun Hung's master, later broke up	
Bowie Lam; Ronald Law (youth)	Lau Chun Hung (Joe) 劉俊雄	A trade union executive/A Legco candidate Kong Siu Chuen's apprentice, later broke up Au Hoi Ching's superior and love interest, later her lover, finally broke up	43
Cindy Lee	Au Hoi Ching (Cloris) 區海晴	A trade union member Lau Chun Hung's assistant Love Lau Chun Hung, later his mistress, finally broke up Committed suicide on Episode 27	

=== Ching Ho Finance ===
Cast	Role	Description	Age
Elaine Jin	Yung Cheuk Wah (Brenda) 翁卓樺	Shareholder; Hau Chiu Ping's ex-girlfriend Lau Chun Hung's superior, later mistress Died in a car accident in Episode 25	50
Moses Chan	Sung Yee Long (Angus) 宋以朗	Chief Operations Officer; Resigned in Episode 20	40
Bowie Lam	Lau Chun Hung (Joe) 劉俊雄	Chief Operations Officer; Yung Cheuk Wah's subordinate, later lover Joined in Episode 20	43
Chan Hung-lit	Hau Chiu Ping (George) 侯釗平	Yung Cheuk Wah's ex-boyfriend	
Queenie Chu	Lam Pui Ling (Jessica) 林佩玲	Sung Yee Long's subordinate and lover Yung Cheuk Tung's love rival Resigned in Episode 20	27
Cheung Kwok Keung	Lui Yiu-bun (Ben) 雷耀彬	Triad member Sung Yee Long's subordinate, later Lau Chun Hung's subordinate Loved Lam Pui Ling	
Kenny Wong	Cheng Chun Hin (Ronnie) 鄭振軒	Actuary; Joined in Episode 24	44

=== CC Radio ===
Cast	Role	Description	Age
Andy Tai	Hung Mao Sum (Sam) 洪茂森	Radio Commander	
Charmaine Sheh; Angel Chiang (youth)	Yip Chi Yan (Hazel, Yan) 葉梓恩	DJ	34
Catherine Chau	Mabel	DJ; Yip Chi Yan's colleague	
Rachel Kan	Daisy	DJ; Yip Chi Yan's colleague	
Bryant Mak	Gordon	DJ; Yip Chi Yan's colleague	
Joe Junior	Dr. Dylan	A retired DJ that works in Yip Chi Yan's DJ Radio Station	
Tai Yiu Ming	Rico	DJ assistant Yip Chi Yan's assistant	

=== Other cast ===
Cast	Role	Description
Stanley Cheung	Hui Ka Ming 許家明	A telecom technician, a band guitarist Yip Chi Yan's boyfriend and love of her life Lau Chun Hung, Sung Yee Long and Cheng Chun Hin's friend Killed and eaten by Lau Chun Hung, Sung Yee Long and Cheng Chun Hin at the snow mountain
Felix Lok	Ivan Wong	A doctor Ma Wing-yee's lover, later broke up
Tsui Wing	Arthur	Yip Chi Yan's lover, later broke up
Ben Wong	Bowman	A cook Yip Chi Yan's husband, later divorced
Calinda Chan (陳宛蔚)		Sweets Shop owner
Yeung Ching Wah (楊證樺)		
Ho Wai Yip (何偉業)		
Yiu Ho Ching (姚浩政)		
Cheung Hon Pan (張漢斌)		
Fu Kim Hung (傅劍虹)		
Chung Yuk Ching (鍾鈺精)		
Tsang Yuen Sa (曾琬莎)		
Wong Lok Yee (黃樂兒)		
Janice Ting (丁樂鍶)		
Owen Ng (吳雲甫)		

== Viewership ratings ==
Week	Originally Aired	Episodes	Average Points	Peaking Points	References
1	21 November 2011	1	29	30	
1	21–25 November 2011	1 – 5	26	30	
2	28 November – 1 December 2011	6 – 9	25	28	
3	6–9 December 2011	10 – 13	23	—	
4	12–16 December 2011	14 – 18	23	—	
5	19–23 December 2011	19 – 23	23	26	
6	26–30 December 2011	24 – 28	24	—	
6	1 January 2012	29 – 30	30	34	

== Theme songs ==
The opening and closing theme songs of When Heaven Burns were composed by Paul Wong, formerly of the Hong Kong band Beyond. Paul Wong is the guitarist for both songs and is the vocalist for the opening theme. The closing theme is sung by the three male leads and serves as the reconstructed lost song.

The plot line of a band returning home with one of their member dead has led to comparisons between the fictional band and Beyond.

== Censorship in mainland China ==
On 27 December 2011, with four episodes to go, China's State Administration of Radio, Film, and Television ordered the sub-licensees to withdraw the video streaming on 11 websites based on the pretext of cannibalism, making When Heaven Burns the first Hong Kong soap opera series to be censored in mainland China in over two decades. The real-time relay in Guangdong province was unaffected, however, and the remaining episodes were shown on television without hindrance in that province. The underlying reason for this withdrawal was thought to be because of the show's underlying allusions to the Tiananmen Square protests of 1989 and non-mainland China media considered this move as censorship. The storyline and the characters demonstrated similarities to the Tiananmen Square protest. When interviewed by Hong Kong's Apple Daily, the show's screenwriter agreed that the story was inspired by the government crackdown on the student democracy movement.

== Awards and nominations ==
On 17 December 2012, When Heaven Burns won the TVB Anniversary Award for best drama in 2012, the award was a result of a popular vote.

2012 TVB Anniversary Awards

- Best Drama
- Nominated – Best Actress (Charmaine Sheh) – Top 5
- Nominated – My Favourite Female Character (Charmaine Sheh) – Top 10

My AOD Favourite Awards 2012

- Nominated – Best Drama
- Nominated – Best Actress (Charmaine Sheh) – Top 5
- Nominated – Top 15 Character (Charmaine Sheh)
- Nominated – Top 15 Character (Bowie Lam)
- Nominated – Best Theme Song (年少無知 by Bowie Lam, Moses Chan and Kenny Wong)

CASH Golden Sail Music Awards 2012

- Best Chorus Performance (年少無知 by Bowie Lam, Moses Chan and Kenny Wong)

17th Asian Television Awards 2012

- Best Actor – Moses Chan

Metro Radio Hits Music Awards 2012

- My Most Appreciated Song (年少無知 by Paul Wong)

Ultimate Song Chart Awards 2012

- WeChat Chit Chat Most Popular Song (年少無知 by Bowie Lam, Moses Chan and Kenny Wong)
- My Favourite Song (年少無知 by Bowie Lam, Moses Chan and Kenny Wong)

RTHK Top 10 Gold Songs Awards 2012

- Top 10 Gold Songs
- Nominated – Top 10 Singers (Bowie Lam, Moses Chan and Kenny Wong)
