= Russell Cheung =

Hong Kong actor

- 張智軒
- Born: 4 April 1977 (age 49); Hong Kong
- Occupation: Actor
- Years active: 1999–present

Chinese name
- Traditional Chinese: 張智軒
- Simplified Chinese: 张智轩
Transcriptions
Standard Mandarin
- Hanyu Pinyin: Zhāng Zhìxuān
Yue: Cantonese
- Jyutping: Zoeng1 Zi3 Hin1

Russell Cheung (Chinese: 張智軒; born 4 April 1977) is a Hong Kong actor under the contract of TVB.

== Filmography ==
=== Television series ===
- Face to Face (1999)
- On the Track or Off (2001)
- Love is Beautiful (2002)
- Let's Face It (2002)
- Burning Flame II (2002)
- Survivor's Law (2003)
- Perish in the Name of Love (2003)
- Net Deception (2004)
- Revolving Doors of Vengeance (2005)
- Into Thin Air (2005)
- Always Ready (2005)
- Forensic Heroes (2006)
- Placebo Cure (2006)
- La Femme Desperado (2006)
- Dicey Business (2006)
- Men in Pain (2006)
- Maiden's Vow (2006)
- Ten Brothers (2007)
- The Family Link (2007)
- On the First Beat (2007)
- War and Destiny (2007)
- The Ultimate Crime Fighter(2007)
- Word Twisters' Adventures (2007)
- Survivor's Law II (2007-2008)
- Wasabi Mon Amour (2008)
- The Four (2008)
- Forensic Heroes II (2008)
- Off Pedder (2008–2010)
- The Winter Melon Tale (2009)
- A Chip Off the Old Block (2009)
- A Watchdog's Tale (2009)
- Suspects in Love (2010)
- An Uninvited Date (2010)
- When Lanes Merge (2010)
- Beauty Knows No Pain (2010)
- Curse of the Royal Harem (2011)
- 36 Hours on Call (2012)
- Brother's Keeper (2013)
- 36 Hours on Call II (2013)
- I Bet Your Pardon (2019)
