= Fight for Love (TV series) =

Hong Kong television series

- DVD cover
- 談談情·練練武
- Genre: Martial arts Romantic comedy
- Screenplay by: Mak Sai-lung; Lai Ka-ming; Man Kin-fai; Choi Suk-yin; Alex Pau
- Directed by: Kwan Wing-chung; Yau Nam-lung; Cheng Wing-kei; Lai Pak-kin
- Starring: Bowie Lam; Sonija Kwok; Gong Beibi; Ha Yu; Fiona Yuen; Patrick Tang
- Theme music composer: Wong Seung-wai
- Opening theme: Cantonese: Escape for Life (逃出生天) by Bowie Lam; Mandarin: A Person's Road (一個人的路) by Bowie Lam
- Ending theme: Unknowing (不知不覺) by Bowie Lam and Kit Chan; Return When it's Cold (天冷就回來) by Kit Chan
- Country of origin: Hong Kong
- Original language: Cantonese
- No. of episodes: 20

Production
- Producer: Jonathan Chik
- Production locations: Hong Kong; Beijing, China
- Camera setup: Multi camera
- Production companies: Television Broadcasts Limited (TVB); China International Television Corporation (CITVC)

Original release
- Network: TVB
- Release: 2 February – 27 February 2004

Fight for Love
- Traditional Chinese: 談談情·練練武
- Simplified Chinese: 谈谈情·练练武
- Literal meaning: "Talk About Love, Practice Martial Arts"
Transcriptions
Standard Mandarin
- Hanyu Pinyin: Tán Tán Qíng·Liàn Liàn Wǔ
Yue: Cantonese
- Jyutping: Taam4 Taam4 Cing4·Lin6 Lin6 Mou2

Fight for Love is a Hong Kong martial arts and romantic comedy television series co-produced by Television Broadcasts Limited (TVB) and China International Television Corporation (CITVC) and starring Bowie Lam, Sonija Kwok, and Gong Beibi. It was filmed from August 2001 to early 2002 and was aired overseas from 27 May to 21 June 2002. Then, it premiered in Hong Kong on TVB Pay Vision's TVB Drama channel on 2 February 2004 and ended on 27 February 2004. The drama premiered on TVB Jade on 2 January 2013 and ended on 31 January of the same year.

== Plot ==
Ng Ka-kit is a promotions manager for an IT company and is sent by the company to take part in a training project in Beijing. Kit never imagined that this training involves learning Wushu. At the Wushu Academy, he meets his old nemesis, Vivian Yan who is a singer and also sacked office boy Lam Muk-sui. Vivian is learning Wushu because she wants to break into the American markets. These three Hong Kong people, who normally would not talk to each other find common ground and a common enemy in their Beijing coach Sun Zheng. Kit fancies the assistant coach He Dan but she likes someone else. Living together at the Wushu Academy makes Kit, Vivian and Sui understand that Zheng is strict because he wants to train their concentration and Wushu spirit. When they realize this, their hatred turns into respect and Kit and Zheng become great friends.

On his return to Hong Kong, Kit finds that he has lost all his power in the company and angrily resigns. On the other hand, Vivian's popularity has been dimmed by a newcomer. Sharing their problems, they go into business together and just as Kit is about to ask Vivian to be his girlfriend, her career picks up and she declines his love. At this time, Dan comes to Hong Kong to work as stunt double in order to fund her boyfriend's dream. Kit rekindles his feelings for Dan as Vivian looks on with envy but holds back her own feelings for the sake of her ego.

== Cast ==
Cast	Role
Bowie Lam	Ng Ka-kit (吳家傑)
Sonija Kwok	Vivian Yan (殷彩兒)
Gong Beibi	Ho Dan (何丹)
Ha Yu	Tsui Po (徐波)
Fiona Yuen	Aka Ching (程尚怡)
Patrick Tang	Lam Muk-sui (林木水)
JoJo Cho (曹眾)	Lee Kau-chun (李九珍)
Kenny Wong	Joe Ha (夏祖蔭)
Chen Zhihui	Suen Cheng (孫正)
Zhang Xiaolong (張曉龍)	Yip Chun (葉俊)
Almen Wong (黃佩霞)	Stella Cheung (張冰山)
Steven Ho (何啟南)	Ken Chan (陳旭明)
Jerry Koo (古明華)	Sam Chow (周偉強)
Jenny Yam (任港秀)	Cat Fung (馮寶珊)
Edith Wong (王殷廷)	Eva Lam (林佩琪)
Sharon Chan	Gigi
