= Yummy Yummy (TV series) =

- Also known as: Food for Life
- Genre: Modern Drama
- Starring: Kevin Cheng; Raymond Lam; Charmaine Sheh; Tavia Yeung
- Opening theme: "與朋友共" by Kevin Cheng, Raymond Lam, Charmaine Sheh, & Tavia Yeung
- Ending theme: "三角兩面" by Kevin Cheng
- Countries of origin: Hong Kong; Singapore
- Original language: Cantonese
- No. of episodes: 30

Production
- Producer: Amy Wong
- Running time: approx. 45 minutes

Original release
- Network: TVB
- Release: 1 August – 9 September 2005

Yummy Yummy (Chinese: 雅米雅米, also known as Food for Life) is an episodic drama filmed by Singapore's Mediacorp and Hong Kong's Television Broadcasts Limited in a joint collaboration. It was released in August 2005. The series is notable for being one of the few Singaporean co-productions in a language other than English or Mandarin Chinese.

== Plot ==
After meeting on game show called Yummy Yummy, five contestants keep in touch and become friends. They face with a number of challenges as they attempt to open a restaurant together, but in the end their friendships persevere.

Daniel Yau is the only son of a wealthy restaurant owner. Chan Ka Lok is a poor, but nice boy who works at his family's shop that sells chickens. Mandy Chow is an orphan who learned to be independent after her parents were divorced and her mother died. Yan Chow is the younger sister of Mandy and loves to eat dried foods, especially dried lemons. Mandy and Yan did not know they were sisters until they became good friends. Terry Ng lives in Singapore with his bossy mother and quiet father.

Terry joined Yummy Yummy because he discovered that the contestants would receive the chance to go to Hong Kong. Terry's girlfriend, Jane lived in Hong Kong and he wanted to find her. Chan Ka Bo is the younger sister of Chan Ka Lok. She met Terry because he was one of her brother's good friends. Yuko Leong is the only daughter of a wealthy businessman. She is a rich, spoiled girl who lived in Singapore.

Daniel met Yuko while the contestants of Yummy Yummy visited Singapore. She accused Daniel of scratching her BMW because she saw him touching the scar on her car. In the game show, Chan Ka Lok, Daniel Yau, Terry Ng and Yan Chow are on the yellow team. Mandy Chow is one of the managers of Yummy Yummy. In the end, they found out that they have something in common.

== Cast ==
- Kevin Cheng as Chan Ka Lok (Gai Zai 雞仔) 陳家樂
- Charmaine Sheh as Chow Man Hei (Mandy) 周文希
- Tavia Yeung as Chow Zhi Yan (Lemon 檸檬) 周芷茵
- Raymond Lam as Yao Hok Lei (Daniel) 遊學灃
- Ben Yeo as Wong Fuk Sang (Terry Ng) 王福生

=== Other cast ===
- Mimi Chu
- Peter Yu
- Chen Huihui
- Shaun Chen as Wu Shilong
- Adam Chen as Rambo
- Lynn Poh
- Michelle Chia as Yuko Leong
- Natalie Tong
- Iris Wong

== Awards and nominations ==
Year	Ceremony	Category	Nominee	Result	Ref
2006	Astro Wah Lai Toi Drama	My Favourite Actor in a Leading Role	Kevin Cheng (as Chan Ga Lok)	Nominated	
2006	Astro Wah Lai Toi Drama	My Favourite Actress in a Leading Role	Charmaine Sheh (as Mandy Chow)	Nominated	
2006	Astro Wah Lai Toi Drama	My Top 12 Favourite Characters	Kevin Cheng (as Chan Ga Lok)	Nominated	
2006	Astro Wah Lai Toi Drama	My Top 12 Favourite Characters	Charmaine Sheh (as Mandy Chow)	Nominated	
2006	Astro Wah Lai Toi Drama	My Top 12 Favourite Characters	Raymond Lam (as Daniel Yau)	Nominated	
2006	Astro Wah Lai Toi Drama	My Favourite Drama Theme Song	"Together with Friends" (与朋友共) by Raymond Lam and Kevin Cheng	Nominated	
