= Love Bond =

- Official image
- 心花放
- Genre: Modern Drama
- Starring: Michael Tao; Kenix Kwok; Moses Chan; Bernice Liu; Anne Heung; Paul Chun
- Opening theme: "心花無限" by Moses Chan
- Ending theme: "心裡話" by Michael Tao, Kenix Kwok, Bernice Liu, & Moses Chan
- Country of origin: Hong Kong
- Original language: Cantonese
- No. of episodes: 30

Production
- Running time: 45 minutes (approx.)

Original release
- Network: TVB
- Release: February 28 – April 8, 2005

Love Bond (Traditional Chinese: 心花放) is a TVB modern drama series broadcast in February 2005.

It is a warm family show which follows two families, the Gei and the Lam, who are neighbors in the same building. This series also marked the fifth collaboration between Michael Tao and Kenix Kwok following the first three installments of the Detective Investigation Files Series and 2004's Shine On You.

== Synopsis ==
Roses represent love while plum blossoms symbolize nobility;
Stars and great actors... Together they show you a family in love!

== Cast ==
=== The Lam family ===
Cast	Role	Description
Michael Tao (陶大宇)	Lam Yat-Kong 林一江	Chef; Gei Hoi-Sam's husband. Cheung Bik-Fun's ex-boyfriend. Lam Yee-Cheung, Lam Sam-Hor, Lam Sei-Hoi, and Lam Siu-Wu's brother.
Edmond So (蘇志威)	Lam Yee-Cheung 林二洋	Chi Yuet (姿月) Plastic Flower Company Owner; Chin Man-Lei's husband. Lam Yat Kong, Lam Sam-Hor, Lam Sei-Hoi, and Lam Siu-Wu's brother.
June Chan (陳琪)	Chin Man-Lei (Money) 錢敏俐	Chi Yuet (姿月) Plastic Flower Company Clerk; Lam Yee-Cheung's wife.
Moses Chan	Lam Sam-Hor/Sit Shui 林三河/薛水	Renovator; Gei Mei-Lai's husband. Gei Hoi-Sam's ex-boyfriend. Lam Yat-Kong, Lam Yee-Cheung, Lam Sei-Hoi, and Lam Siu-Wu's long lost brother.
Oscar Leung (梁烈唯)	Lam Sei-Hoi 林四海	Chi Yuet (姿月) Plastic Flower Company Clerk; Gei Chung-Ming's best friend. Lam Yat-Kong, Lam Yee-Cheung, Lam Sam-Hor, and Lam Siu-Wu's brother.
Natalie Tong	Lam Siu-Wu 林小湖	Student; Tung Yan's girlfriend. Lam Yat-Kong, Lam Yee-Cheung, Lam Sam-Hor, and Lam Sei-Hoi's sister.

=== The Gei family ===
Cast	Role	Description
Paul Chun	Gei Tin-Man 紀天文	Gei Hoi-Sam, Gei Mei-Lai and Gei Chung-Ming's father.
Kenix Kwok	Gei Hoi-Sam 紀開心	One Cup of Flower Tea (一杯花茶) Cafe Owner; Lam Yat-Kong's wife. Lam Sam-Hor's ex-girlfriend. Gei Mei-Lai and Gei Chung-Ming's sister.
Bernice Liu	Gei Mei-Lai 紀美麗	Custom Officer; Lam Sam-Hor's wife. Gei Hoi-Sam and Gei Chung-Ming's sister.
Fred Cheng	Gei Chung-Ming 紀聰明	Student; Lam Sei-Hoi's best friend. Gei Hoi-Sam and Gei Mei-Lai's brother.

=== Other cast ===
Cast	Role	Description
Alice Fung So-bor	Sit Chan-Hei 薛陳喜	Lam Sam-Hor's foster mother.
Stephen Wong	Tung Yan 童仁	Renovator; Lam Sam-Hor's best friend. Lam Siu-Wu's boyfriend.
Anne Heung	Cheung Bik-Fun 章碧芬	Lam Yat-Kong's ex-girlfriend.
