= List of Every Move You Make characters =

Characters from police procedural television drama series

The following is a list of characters from Every Move You Make, a police procedural television drama produced by TVB.

== Main characters ==
=== CID unit members ===
==== Linus Yiu ====
Bowie Lam portrays Linus Yiu Hok-sum (姚學琛), the unit's Senior Inspector. He studied microexpressions and applied psychology at an unspecified university in the United States for half a year before returning to Hong Kong as West Kowloon Police Department's new CID senior inspector. His addition to the unit sparks mixed reactions from the team members, especially Chow Fun, who disapproves his methods of investigation, slamming them as ridiculous methods. Hok-sum, however, does not seem to mind Chow Fun's obvious lack of respect and continues to peacefully and productively work with the unit members. He quickly befriends Ma-dam, who later becomes his love interest.

==== Phoenix Yip ====
Kristal Tin portrays Phoenix Yip Chin-ting (葉展婷), nicknamed Ma-dam, the unit's Station Sergeant. Ma-dam is known for being the caretaker and nanny of the unit, thus members of the unit (as well as the rest of the police department) gave her the nickname "Ma-dam", with the "ma" representing "mom". Throughout the drama, the story depicts her going through a divorce. Her husband, Raymond, files for divorce due to irreconcilable differences, and applies for full custody of their son, Jacky.

==== Trevor Ho ====
Bosco Wong portrays Trevor Ho Lai-yin (何禮賢), nicknamed Chow Fun, the unit's Sergeant. He initially disapproves of Hok-sum's methods of using microexpression interpretation and other observation skills to investigate cases, but later finds these skills useful after he begins dating Hok-sum's younger half-sister, Perlie.

==== Mak Wing-hei ====
Lai Lok-yi portrays Mak Wing-hei (麥永希), known as Hei, is the jokester cop of the unit. He vocally expresses his love for rich women, and consistently bickers with Fly, his partner-in-crime. He later realizes his feelings for Fly after he breaks up with his rich celebrity girlfriend.

==== Wu Hau-ying ====
Lorretta Chow portrays Wu Hau-ying (胡巧瑩), nicknamed Fly. She develops a one-sided crush on Hei ever since she joined the CID unit and became Hei's partner-in-crime. To hide her feelings, she constantly bickers with Hei. Hok-sum and Ma-dam notices her comfortable body language around Hei, and they decide to help with her relationship with Hei.

==== Kan Ho-ming ====
Jack Hui portrays Kan Ho-ming (簡浩明), known as Ming, is the hard-working cop of the unit. He is impressed with Hok-sum's intelligence and talent, and is always opened to learning his skills.

=== Ching family ===
==== Ching Shiu-on ====
Lau Kong portrays Ching Siu-on (程兆安), the Ching family's eldest son. He is the largest shareholder of family-owned Tai Hung To Restaurant.

==== Lo Sui-heung ====
Alice Fung So-bor portrays Lo Sui-heung (盧瑞香), Siu-on's wife.

==== Ching Yin-ha ====
Helen Ma portrays Ching Yin-ha (程燕霞), the Ching family's eldest daughter.

==== Ching Yin-ping ====
Mannor Chan portrays Ching Yin-ping (程燕萍), the Ching family's youngest daughter.

==== Ching Shiu-hong ====
Yu Yang portrays Ching Siu-hong (程兆康), the Ching family's youngest son. He is Hok-sum's stepfather and Perlie's biological father.

==== Chung Sau-han ====
Susan Tse portrays Chung Sau-han (鍾秀嫻), Siu-hong's wife. She is Hok-sum and Perlie's biological mother.

==== Ching Sau-yip ====
Tsui Wing portrays Ching Sau-yip (程守業), Siu-on and Sui-heung's son.

==== Perlie Ching ====
Aimee Chan portrays Perlie Ching Bui-yee (程貝兒), Hok-sum's younger half-sister who works as a public relations specialist at the police department. She is the girlfriend of Trevor Ho.

==== Kelvin Cheung ====
Matthew Ko portrays Kelvin Cheung Chi-kit (張志傑), Yin-ha's son.

== Criminal cases ==
=== The murder of Annie Leung (Ep. 1–2) ===
Cast	Role	Description
Samantha Ko	Annie Leung 梁思敏	Gordan Lam's subordinate and mistress (Villain)
Raymond Cho	Gordan Lam 林維生	Ng Mei-yu's husband Annie Leung's supervisor and lover (Villain)
Benjamin Yuen	Lo Man-kin 盧文健	Annie Leung's colleague Sought love to Annie Leung
Jason Chan	Ho Wing-kwong (Anthony) 何永光	Annie Leung's colleague Sought love to Annie Leung
Eileen Yeow	Ng Mei-yue 吳美如	Gordan Lam's wife (Villain)

=== The murder of Donald Lai (Ep. 3–Ep. 5) ===
Cast	Role	Description
Halina Tam	Daisy Liu 廖美詩	Founder of a memory school Yiu Hok-sam's friend Donald Lai's superior and girlfriend (Villain)
Stefan Wong	Donald Lai 黎進鴻	A memory school instructor Daisy Liu's subordinate and boyfriend Ngai Wing-shan's teacher and lover
Janet Chow	Ngai Wing-shan 魏詠珊	Actress; Donald Lai's student and mistress
Choi Hong-nin	Wilson	Former memory school instructor

=== The rape of Emily Chow and the murder of Katie Lam (Ep. 5–Ep. 7) ===
Cast	Role	Description
Candy Cheung	Katie Lam 林愛琦	A model Emily Chow's half-sister
Macy Chan	Emily Chow 周苑慧	A singer Katie Lam's half-sister (Semi-villain)
Jason Pai	Hung Kwan 洪坤	A retired martial artist Chin So-fun's lover Edmond Tang's father (Villain)
Ching Hor Wai	Chin So-fun 錢素芬	A retired actress Edmond Tang's mother Hung Kwan's mistress (Villain)
Jack Wu	Edmond Tang 鄧仲軒	Son of a billionaire Hung Kwan and Chin So-fun's son Ling Tan-tan's fiancé (Villain)
Eda Chan	Ling Tan-tan 凌丹丹	Edmond Tang's fiancée

=== The murder of Wong Chun-yu (Ep. 8–Ep. 11) ===
Cast	Role	Description
Bowie Wu	Wong Chun-yu 王振宇	A New Year picture shop owner Wong Hiu-tung and Wong Pui-man's father Fan Xiao-li's master and lover, later father-in-law
Kong Ming-fai	Wong Hiu-tung 王曉東	Wong Chun-yu's son Wong Pui-man's elder brother Fan Xiao-li's husband
Vivien Yeo	Fan Xiao-li 范小莉	Wong Hiu-tung's wife Wong Chun-yu's apprentice and mistress, later daughter-in-law Xiao Gang's ex-girlfriend (Villain)
Luvin Ho	Wong Pui-man 王佩雯	Wong Chun-yu's daughter Wong Hiu-tung's younger sister
Angela Tong	Yuen Ling-tsz 玄靈子	A fortune teller Made a fortune for Wong Chun-yu
Hugo Wong	Xiao Gang 曉剛	Fan Xiao-li's ex-boyfriend

=== The murder of Tsang Wing-sing and the swindling of Swindler Group (Ep. 11-15) ===
Cast	Role	Description
Felix Lok	Yiu Tin-po 姚天保	Age 61; A swindler and the case culprit Yiu Hok-sam's father Chung Sau-han's ex-husband Tang Ping-ping's lover Colluded with Tsang Wing-sing to cheat Lo Chi-fai's money (Main Villain)
Nancy Wu	Tang Ping-ping 鄧冰冰	A swindler and the case culprit Self-claimed to be Zhou Peng-jun's secretary Yiu Tin-po's mistress Cheated and threatened Ching Sau-yip (Main Villain)
Ngai Man-wai	Tsang Wing-sing 曾永成	IPA Investment General Manager; Colluded with Yiu Tin Po to cheat Lo Chi-fai's money (Villain)
Mak Ka-lun	Lo Chi-fai 盧志輝	Tsang Wing-sing's investment client, but cheated by Yiu Tin-po and Tsang Wing-sing (Villain)
Tsui Wing	Ching Sau-yip 程守業	Tai Hung To Restaurant's boss Cheated and threatened by Zhou Peng-jun, Lee Siu-kong and Tang Ping-ping
Lau Yat-fei	Zhou Peng-jun 周鵬軍	A swindler Self-claimed to be an iron enterprise boss Cheated and threatened Ching Sau-yip (Villain)
Bond Chan	Lee Siu-kong 李小鋼	A swindler Self-claimed to be Zhou Peng-jun's assistant Cheated and threatened Ching Sau-yip (Villain)

=== The murder of triad leaders (Ep. 16-20) ===
Cast	Role	Description
Max Cheung	Kwan Lo 軍佬	A triad leader Tan Tsui's subordinate (Villain)
Wong Ching	Tan Tsui 炭疽	A triad leader Kwan Lo's leader (Villain)
Chang Tse-sheng	Leung Wing-tai 梁永泰	A triad leader Kwan Lo's enemy (Villain)
Ruco Chan	Chiu Man-hoi 趙文海	Suffered from dissociative identity disorder Former police undercover Tan Tsui's former triad subordinate Wong Tin-wing's former police subordinate Lee Lim-chee's husband Trevor Ho's friend (Main villain)
Jeanette Leung	Lam Lim-chee 林念慈	Chiu Man-hoi's wife
Samuel Kwok	Wong Tin-wing 黃天榮	Top management of a security guard company Former policeman Chiu Man-hoi's former supervisor
