= Revolving Doors of Vengeance =

- 酒店風雲
- Genre: Modern Drama
- Starring: Joe Ma; Kenix Kwok; Ron Ng; Ella Koon
- Opening theme: "心計" by Hacken Lee
- Ending theme: "別怪她" by Ron Ng
- Country of origin: Hong Kong
- Original language: Cantonese
- No. of episodes: 30

Production
- Producer: Poon Ka Tak
- Running time: 45 minutes (approx.)

Original release
- Network: TVB
- Release: August 15 – September 23, 2005

Revolving Doors of Vengeance (Traditional Chinese: 酒店風雲) is a 30-episode TVB series which was released in 2005. The fictional Royal Court Hotel is based on Crown Prince Hotel, which is located in Dongguan, Guangdong province of China.

== Plot summary ==
The story befalls the family of Wong Yuk Ting (Lau Dan) who runs a five-star hotel chain and tells of how repaying a favour turns into seeking vengeance in a twisting story of honour and revenge. Wong Kai Kit (Ron Ng) is the youngest son of Wong Yuk Ting, but his two elder brothers are not the suitable heirs to the family's wealth in the eyes of his father. Then Yuk Ting suddenly dies mysteriously and the business is strangely handed to a man named Ko Fung (Joe Ma) to head. He develops a romance with Bik Kei (Kenix Kwok), whom he meets in the hotel and becomes embroiled in a tangled power struggle with the family, including Kit's uncle Wing Fat (John Chiang), where deceit and plots unfold around every twist and turn. Ko Fung saved the business for another purpose and because of this, him and Kai Kit were always at odds. Through their many arguments and conflicts, Kai Kit slowly matured...

== Cast ==
=== Ko Family ===
- Joe Ma as Martin Ko Fung
- Lo Hoi Pang as Chan Dai Hoi / Ko San (Martin's father)
- Derek Kok as Mark Long Gok Cheung

=== Wong Family ===
- Ron Ng as Wong Kai Kit
  - Kevin Yau as Young Wong Kai Kit (Son of Wong Yuk Ting and Ho Kit Wan, half-younger and arch-foe brother of Yip and Chi, but later reconciled, Fred Cheng Wing Fat's third nephew, third cousin and secret lover of Chloe)
- Ellesmere Choi as Wong Kai Yip (Eldest son of Wong Yuk Ting (born by his first wife), Fred Cheng Wing Fat's first nephew, Chi's elder brother, Kit's half-elder brother and Chloe's first cousin)
- Edward Mok as Wong Kai Chi (Youngest son of Wong Yuk Ting (born by his first wife), Fred Cheng Wing Fat's second nephew, Yip's younger brother, Kit's half-elder brother and Chloe's second cousin)
- Mary Hon as Ho Kit Wan (Ting's second wife, Kit's mother, Yip and Chi's stepmother, Julie's step-mother-in-law)
- Lau Dan as Wong Yuk Ting (Yip, Chi and Kit's father)
- Rainbow Ching Hor Wai as Cheng Yuet Fung (Late sister of Fred Cheng Wing Fat, late wife of Wong Yuk Ting and late mother of Yip and Chi)
- Winnie Yeung as Julie Yip Ju Lay (Yip's wife, divorced, but later complexed)

=== Koo Family ===
- Kenix Kwok as Becky Koo Bik Kei
- Bak Yan as Aunty Lan
- Lawrence Ng as Koo Ka Hyun

=== Lee Family ===
- Ella Koon as Lee Hoi Sum / Happy (Friend, later girlfriend of Kit, love rival of Chloe)
- Bruce Li as Lee Gin 李堅
- Lee Fung as Lor Mei Choi 羅美彩
- Nicky Law as Lee Hoi Long 李開朗

=== Cheng Family ===
- Elaine Yiu as Chloe Cheng Ho Yi (Main Villain, Yip, Chi and Kit's cousin, had a crush on Kit, love rival of Hoi Sum)
- David Chiang as Cheng Wing Fat, Fred (Main Villain, Chloe's father)
- Rebecca Chan as Lam Shuet Hing (Villain, Chloe's mother)

=== Royal Court Hotel ===
- Felix Lok as Ng Gam Kuen (Courtier of Royal Court, Wong Yuk Ting's assistant, resigned, but later reinstate)
- Henry Lo as Lau Bo Yan (head chef)
- Eddie Lee as a chef
- Deno Cheung as Patrick (manager)
- Rachel Kan as Elaine (Ko Fung's secretary)
- Eric Chung as Wilson Fong
- Kwok Tak Shun as Tang Heng Kwai (shareholder)
- Kong Hon as Dong Bo (shareholder)
- Choi Kwok Hing as Jung Gin Fu (shareholder)
- Yu Tin Wai as Poon Siu Ge
- Janice Shum as Chow Siu Fong
- Ng Wai Shan as Ng Pui San
- Koo Ming Wa as Lan Wai Gwang (security officer)
- Yip Jan Seng as Lo Chi Seng (security officer)
- Lau Tin Lung (security officer)
- Joseph Yeung as Raymond (reception clerk)
- Jacky Yeung as Tsang Kwong Hung (reception clerk)
- Karen Lee (李焯寧) as Sandy Yeung Lai Fa (reception clerk)
- Chan On Ying as Kwok Kiu Yong (cleaner)
- Peter Pang as To Ji Chai

=== Other cast ===
- Raymond Cho as Benjamin
- Nancy Wu as Maria
- Catherine Chau as Cheurk Ying Nuen
- Vin Choi as catwalk model
- Martin Tong as James
- Kwong Chor Fai as Mr Poon
- Lee Kai Kit as police
- Hugo Wong as journalist
- Leung Kin Ping as Mr Leung
- Cerina da Graca as Princess of Sultan (ep13)
- Kitty Lau as Princess of Sultan accompanying (ep13)
- June Chan as Becky's friend (ep28)
- So Yun Chi as May Hui Mei Ching
- Ling Lai Man as Uncle Dung
- Suen Kwai Hing as one eyed man
- Russell Cheung as Sunny
- Dia Yiu Ming as Ah Keung
- Reyan Yan as a nurse
- Amy Ng
- Wong Man Piu
- Hoffman Cheng
- Siu Cheuk Hiu as Chu Tao
- Leo Tsang as doctor
- Ngai Wai Man as accountant
- Wu Kei Fung as Andy
- Andy Dai as Mr Lin
- Ricky Wong as Pau Gor (triad leader)
- Cheung Dat Lun as Pau's followers
- Tsui Wing as a police officer
- Raymond Chiu as a security officer
- Wong Ka Yi as Si Ying Hung
- Dik Siu Lun
- Wong Kei Sen as Tsui Chun Keung
- Yau Biu
- Kiki Ho as Lo Kei Gwun
