= Kenix Kwok =

Hong Kong actress (born 1969)

- Born: 27 November 1969 (age 56); Hong Kong
- Occupation: Actress
- Years active: 1993–present
- Spouse: Frankie Lam (m. 2004)
- Children: 1
- Awards: TVB Anniversary Awards – My Favourite Television Character; 2002 Legal Entanglement; 2003 Seed of Hope; 2004 Shine on You

Chinese name
Transcriptions
Standard Mandarin
- Hanyu Pinyin: Guō Kěyíng
Yue: Cantonese
- Jyutping: Gwok^{3} Ho^{2} Jing^{4}

Kenix Kwok Ho-ying (born 27 November 1969) is a Hong Kong actress with family roots in Zhongshan, Guangdong, China. Along with Maggie Cheung Ho-yee, Ada Choi, Flora Chan and Jessica Hsuan, Kenix is known as one of the Top 5 "Fa Dans" (花旦) (term used for actresses with high popularity) of TVB from the mid-1990s to mid-2000s.

== Career ==
Kwok got her start as a finalist in the Top 5 of the 1993 Miss Hong Kong Pageant. Though considered a favourite to win, having won two side awards including Media's Favourite and Potential Artist, she lost to Mok Hoi Yan. Consequently, Kwok did not even make it to the Top 3.

Kenix went on to star in several high-rated drama series including A Kindred Spirit, Detective Investigation Files I-III, At the Threshold of An Era I-II, and recently Shine on You, Love Bond, Revolving Doors of Vengeance and Ten Brothers.

In late 2006, Kenix began filming "Red Powder," a series for mainland China with Julian Cheung. The series was released in 2007 in China. Kenix was paid an estimated HK$2.5 million for this series.

In 2008, Kenix signed on to STYLE Model Agency. Her job scope would mainly include modeling in roadshows. She is also allowed to film drama series under her contract with this agency.

On 23 August 2008, Kenix told reporters in an interview over the phone that she would be filming a new 40-episode TVB drama series after two years of rest from filming any TVB series. She said she accepted the role offered to her as she felt the script was very good and TVB was very sincere in asking her to come back (she got a pay rise and two of TVB's top executives personally invited her back to TVB). The filming would commence in November 2008. She would star alongside Gallen Lo, Lui Leong Wai and Anita Yuen. The said series was Born Rich.

== Personal life ==
Kwok began dating Hong Kong actor Frankie Lam in 1994. The couple wed on 10 March 2004. The wedding was much publicised because it was a marriage involving two TVB actors. On 14 January 2010, Kwok gave birth to their first child, daughter Tania Lam Tin-yeuk.

== Filmography ==
=== TV series ===
Year	Title	Role	Awards	Notes
1994	Glittering Moments	Kenix		
1994	Shade of Darkness	Yiu Mei Kei		
1994	Gentle Reflections	Lei Ping Yi		
1994	Remembrance	Sam Nam Sing		
1995	A Kindred Spirit	Lee Tor Foon (Joyce)		
1995	Detective Investigation Files	Ko Chit (Jesse)		
1995	Down Memory Lane	Lou Siu Yin		
1995	Detective Investigation Files II	Ko Chit (Jesse)		
1995	The Criminal Investigator	Ng Chung Lin		
1996	The Criminal Investigator II	Ng Chung Lin		
1996	Food of Love	Man Nga Wing (Ivy)		
1997	Working Women	Lam Bo Jan		
1997	Detective Investigation Files III	Ko Chit (Jesse) / Ning Qian Hua (Vivian)	Nominated – TVB Award for Best Actress	
1998	Crimes of Passion	Au Yeung Fung	Nominated – TVB Award for Best Actress	
1998	Till When Do Us Part	Tin Mei Suet		
1998	Simply Ordinary	Gam Nga Tai		
1999	At the Threshold of an Era	Sum Wing Yan (Ivy)		
2000	At the Threshold of an Era II	Ko Mei No (Mila)		
2000	A Matter of Life and Death Brothers	Chan Seui Fa		
2001	Reaching Out	Yuk Hiu Gwan / Yuk Hiu Nga		
2002	Legal Entanglement	Sam Hok Yi	TVB Award for My Favourite Television Character; Nominated – TVB Award for Best Actress	
2002	Take My Word For It	Gan Giet	Nominated – TVB Award for Best Actress	
2003	Vigilante Force	Luk Wing Zhang (Natalie)		
2003	Seed of Hope	Lam Siu Mun	TVB Award for My Favourite Television Character	
2004	Shine on You	Wong Yerk Se	TVB Award for My Favourite Television Character; Nominated – TVB Award for Best Actress	
2005	Love Bond	Gei Hoi Sum		
2005	Revolving Doors of Vengeance	Koo Bik Kei (Becky)	Nominated – TVB Award for Best Actress	
2005	Ten Brothers	Kei Hau Yee		Warehoused and broadcast in 2007
2006	A Pillow Case of Mystery	Mai Heung Yung	Nominated – TVB Award for Best Actress; Nominated – TVB Award for My Favourite Female Character	
2007	Redtask	Wong Chau Yi		aka Red Powder
2009	Born Rich	Tung Ling-chi	Nominated – TVB Award for Best Actress; Nominated – TVB Award for My Favourite Female Character	

=== Films ===
Year	Title	Role	Notes
1995	No Justice For All	Jan / Kennix Lee	
1995	A Story of Two Drifters	Lei Hung	
1997	Ghost Story 'Godmother of Mongkok'	Tin Tin	
1997	Troublesome Night	Ann	
1998	Her Name is Cat	John's wife	cameo
1998	Casino		
1998	Raped by An Angel 3: Sexual Fantasy of the Chief Executive	Li Li-yin	
2004	Healing Spirit	Ching Sou Sam	
2007	Fearless		
