= Flora Chan =

American actress

Flora Chan Wai-shan
- 陳慧珊
- Born: British Hong Kong
- Education: Boston College
- Occupation: Actress
- Spouses: Chung Wai-ming (m. 1994; div. 2001); Mike Chung Ka-hung (m. 2006)
- Children: Mira Chung Lut-yin (Born 2007 September 17)
- Awards: TVB Anniversary Awards – Best Actress; 2002 Family Man; My Favourite Television Character; 2002 Family Man; 2003 Triumph in the Skies

Chinese name
- Traditional Chinese: 陳慧珊
- Simplified Chinese: 陈慧珊
Transcriptions
Standard Mandarin
- Hanyu Pinyin: chen2 hui4 shan1
Yue: Cantonese
- Jyutping: can4 wai3 saan1
- Musical career
- Origin: Hong Kong
- Genre: Cantopop
- Instrument: Singing

Flora Chan Wai-shan (Chinese: 陳慧珊), is an Hong Kong American actress active primarily in Hong Kong television and film who was a former newscaster, weather presenter and editor for TVB Pearl. Along with Maggie Cheung Ho-yee, Kenix Kwok, Jessica Hsuan, and Ada Choi, she is known as one of the Top 5 "Fa Dans" (term used for actresses with high popularity) of TVB from the mid-1990s to mid-2000s.

== Biography ==
Rather than getting her start from modelling, a beauty pageant, or the Miss Hong Kong Pageant, (香港小姐競選) which provides actresses for HK's television station, TVB, Chan was a reporter for the TVB English Channel, TVB Pearl. In the mid-1990s, television director Teng Dak-Hei asked her to participate in his upcoming series, the fifth installment of the popular TVB drama series, File of Justice.

Chan's performance in this series about young, yuppie lawyers caught the attention of the HK audience, and TVB. She joined as a TVB actress and has since made other series, most notably Untraceable Evidence, playing the calm and collected forensics doctor, "Pauline Lip"; and in Healing Hands, a TVB series known for its cutting edge medical topics. In 2002, Chan won the coveted "Most Favourite TV Actress" award presented annually by TVB. Having already starred in various TVB dramas, she is no longer signed on with TVB as a full-time actress. In November 2006, Chan announced she would be returning to film a TVB serial in February 2007.

== Filmography ==
=== TV series ===
| Year | Title | Role | Awards | Notes |
|---|---|---|---|---|
| 1997 | File of Justice V | Catherine Au Tze-Keung | | |
| 1997 | Untraceable Evidence | Pauline Nip Bo-Yin | | |
| 1998 | Healing Hands | Annie Kong Sun-Yuet | | |
| 1999 | Untraceable Evidence II | Pauline Nip Bo-Yin | | |
| 1999 | Feminine Masculinity | Christine Fong Sze-Ching | TVB Award for My Favourite On-Screen Partners | a.k.a. Mr. Diana |
| 1999 | Sidebeat | Sunnie Kong Bik Ching | | |
| 1999 | At the Threshold of an Era | Helen Fok Hei Yin | | |
| 2000 | At the Threshold of an Era II | Helen Fok Hei Yin | | |
| 2000 | Healing Hands II | Annie Kong Sun Yuet | | |
| 2001 | A Taste of Love | Joyce Kiu Fa Chi | | |
| 2002 | A Case of Misadventure | Joey Tai Foon | | |
| 2002 | Burning Flame II | Michelle Ho Bo Lam | | |
| 2002 | Family Man | Tracy Ko Pui Yi | TVB Award for My Favourite Actress in a Leading Role; TVB Award for My Favourite Television Character | |
| 2003 | Triumph in the Skies | Isabelle Lok Yi San | TVB Award for My Favourite Television Character | |
| 2004 | Hard Fate | Tiffany Mok Hei Yee | | |
| 2004 | To Get Unstuck in Time | Nicole Ko San | | |
| 2010 | Suspects in Love | Cheng Siu-Yan | | |
| 2014 | Never Dance Alone | Diana Yung Daan-Daan | | |
| 2018 | Watch Out, Boss | Hazel Lo Choy-Lam | | |
| 2024 | Expats | Olivia Chu | | |

=== Film ===
| Year | Title | Role | Notes |
|---|---|---|---|
| 1994 | Fatal Maple | Ellen | |
| 2001 | Love Au Zen | Siu Jing | |
| 2002 | Dry Wood Fierce Fire | Michelle | |
| 2006 | Undying Heart | | a.k.a. Min Mie |
| 2007 | Mad Detective | May Cheung (in Bun's eyes) | |
| 2008 | Connected | Jeannie | |

== Discography ==
- Flora Chan (2000)
- 自在 (2001)
- 愛得起 (2002)

Awards and achievements
TVB Anniversary Awards
| Preceded by Liza Wang for The Awakening Story | Best Actress; 2002 for Family Man | Succeeded by Maggie Cheung Ho Yee for The King of Yesterday and Tomorrow |
