= Healing Hands (TV series) =

Hong Kong television series

- Promo poster
- 妙手仁心
- Genre: Modern Drama Medical
- Starring: Lawrence Ng; Bowie Lam; Flora Chan; Ada Choi; Nick Cheung; William So; Steven Ma; Astrid Chan; Angela Tong
- Ending theme: "不想獨自快樂" by William So "曾經幾許" by Steven Ma
- Country of origin: Hong Kong
- Original language: Cantonese
- No. of episodes: 32

Production
- Producer: Gary Tang
- Running time: 45 minutes

Original release
- Network: TVB
- Release: August 31 – October 10, 1998

Related
- Healing Hands II (2000)

Healing Hands
- Chinese: 妙手仁心
- Literal meaning: "Healing Hearts"
Transcriptions
Standard Mandarin
- Hanyu Pinyin: miào shǒu rén xīn
Yue: Cantonese
- Jyutping: miu6 sau2 jan4 sam1

Healing Hands (妙手仁心) is a 1998 Hong Kong medical drama series that ran on TVB Jade. It focuses on the lives and loves of the doctors and nurses at the fictional Yan Oi Hospital in Hong Kong. It is noted for its realism in depicting medical situations, thanks to the help of the Hong Kong Hospital Authority, who had loaned actual hospital equipment and facilities for filming. It can be considered the Hong Kong equivalent to the American television series ER, although its storyline are arguably mirrored in another American series, Grey's Anatomy. Lawrence Ng is the main star of the show as neurosurgeon Dr. Paul Ching Chi Mei. The other main role is played by Bowie Lam, who plays Dr. Henry Lai Kwok Chu as an accident and emergency doctor who is best friends with Paul.

The show was followed by two sequels, Healing Hands II (2000) and Healing Hands III (2005).

== Cast ==
=== Leading stars ===
- Lawrence Ng as Paul Ching Chi-mei (程至美)
- Bowie Lam as Henry Lai Kwok-chu (黎國柱)
- Flora Chan as Annie Kong Sun-yuet (江新月)
- Ada Choi as Jackie Tong Chi-lai (唐姿禮)
- Nick Cheung as Peter Cheung Chong-yip (張創業)
- William So as Gilbert Kong Moon-yuet (江滿月)
- Steven Ma as Joe Cheung Ka-yu (張家裕)
- Astrid Chan as Helen Ling Siu-ha (凌少霞)
- Angela Tong as Judy Chow Suk-yan (周淑茵)

=== Recurring stars ===
- Kenny Wong as Ho Tak-kwong (何德廣)
- Shirley Cheung as May Au Ka-ping (區嘉平)
- Eileen Yeow as Suki Chow Suk-ying (周淑瑛)
- Jojo Cho as Amy Yim Tung (嚴冬)

== Notes and references ==
Awards and achievements
TVB Anniversary Awards
Preceded by Old Time Budy	Best Drama; 1998	Succeeded by N/A

Before: Rural Hero: August 28	TVB Jade Second line series 1998; Healing Hands; August 31 - October 9	Next: Burning Flame; October 12 -
Before: None	TVB Jade The Final Episode Special - Saturday at 21:30-23:30; Healing Hands; October 10	Next: None
