= Healing Hands III =

- 妙手仁心III
- Genre: Medical drama
- Starring: Lawrence Ng; Bowie Lam; Moses Chan; Gigi Lai; Melissa Ng; Raymond Cho; Maggie Shiu; Bernice Liu
- Ending theme: "和你的每一天" by Bowie Lam
- Country of origin: Hong Kong
- Original language: Cantonese
- No. of episodes: 40

Production
- Running time: 45 minutes

Original release
- Network: TVB
- Release: July 25 – September 16, 2005

Related
- Healing Hands II (2000)

Healing Hands III is a 2005 Hong Kong medical drama television series, released following the success of Healing Hands and II, on one of Hong Kong's main television channels, TVB. It is the third and last installment in the Healing Hands series.

It starred the original casts of Healing Hands: Lawrence Ng and Bowie Lam; and Healing Hands II: Moses Chan, Maggie Shiu and Raymond Cho along with new additions to the series, Melissa Ng, Bernice Liu and Gigi Lai. It aired in Hong Kong during (August - September 2005).

== Plot ==
The storyline begins with the end of the SARS epidemic in Hong Kong and the accidental death of Paul's (Lawrence Ng) ex-girlfriend Tracy (Yoyo Mung). Lawrence life begins to be heading into a tailspin after failing to save an Ho Tak-kwong's (Kenny Wong) baby, but Frances (Gigi Lai) is always there to support him. Henry (Bowie Lam) appears at the beginning with a new girlfriend, having broken up with Annie (Flora Chan) between Healing Hands 2 and 3. However, he soon breaks up and despite initial bad impressions of Sarah (Melissa Ng), the two become friends. The drama follows the challenges that the characters face- including the medical obstacles faced by the doctors of Yan Oi hospital and the love life troubles that the various couples of the series overcome.

== Cast ==
=== Main cast ===
- Lawrence Ng as Paul Ching Chi-mei (程至美)
- Bowie Lam as Henry Lai Kwok-chu (黎國柱)
- Moses Chan as M.C. Lam Man-chi (林敏智)
- Raymond Cho as Chris Heung Chung-yan (向眾仁)
- Gigi Lai as Frances Shum Nga-ching (岑雅晴)
- Maggie Shiu as Anson Man On-sang (萬安生)
- Melissa Ng as Sarah Yip To (葉淘)
- Bernice Liu as Betsy Tsang Suk-kei (曾淑淇)

=== Recurring cast ===
- Claire Yiu as Grace Tai Yuk-ying (戴玉瑩)
- Chan Hung Lit as T.Y. Tsang Tat-yin (曾達賢)
- Timothy Cheng as Bryan Wong Kwok-bun (王國彬)
- Michael Tong as Edmond Tam Yung-ming (譚勇明)
- Kenny Wong as Ho Tak-kwong (何德廣)
- Ram Chiang as Kam Ho-man (甘浩文)
- Halina Tam as Phoebe Kan So-wun (簡素媛)
- Sam Chan as Angus Lam Ching-wai (林清偉)
- Annabelle Lau as Karen Liu Mei-kuen (廖美娟)
- Willie Wai as Derek Lo Chi-keung (勞志強)
- Yvonne Lam as Eva Lee Yee-wa (李伊華)
- Felix Lok as Ho Sau-yan (何守仁)
- Vinci Wong as Alan Ho Chi-wang (何志泓)
- Belinda Hamnett as Martha
- Camy Ting as Amy
