= Misleading Track =

- 奪命真夫
- Genre: Modern Suspense
- Starring: Bowie Lam; Deric Wan; Louisa So; Christine Ng
- Opening theme: "灰色錯對" by Bowie Lam
- Country of origin: Hong Kong
- Original language: Cantonese
- No. of episodes: 20

Production
- Running time: 45 minutes (approx.)

Original release
- Network: TVB
- Release: June 22 – July 16, 2005

Misleading Track (Traditional Chinese: 奪命真夫 or also known as 叠影危情) is a TVB modern drama series released overseas in February 2005 and broadcast on TVB Jade Channel in June 2005.

== Cast ==
Cast	Role	Description
Bowie Lam	Law Lei-Ho (Leo) 羅理浩	Lawyer; Yue So-Sun's ex-husband.
Louisa So	Yan Ting (Yen) 殷婷	Yuen Man-Shan's ex-lover.
Deric Wan	Yuen Man-Shan/Lau Kai-Chung (Ben) 阮文山/劉啟忠	Chiang Ngah-Yee's fiancee. Yan Ting's ex-lover.
Christine Ng	Yue So-Sum (Susan) 余素心	Law Lei-Ho's ex-wife. Yau Sheung-Chi's lover.
Cindy Au	Chiang Ngah-Yee (Jenny) 蔣雅怡	Yuen Man-Shan's fiancee.
Winnie Young (楊婉儀)	Wan Suk-Han (Wendy) 溫淑嫻	
Savio Tsang (曾偉權)	Yau Sheung-Chi (Raymond) 游尚志	Yue So-Sum's lover.

== Viewership ratings ==
	Week	Episode	Average Points	Peaking Points	References
1	June 22–24, 2005	1 — 3	28	30	
2	June 27 - July 1, 2005	4 — 8	28	30	
3	July 4–8, 2005	9 — 13	31	32	
4	July 11–15, 2005	14 — 18	32	34	
4	July 16, 2005	19 — 20	37	39	
