= Lawrence Ng =

Hong Kong actor

Lawrence Ng Kai-wah
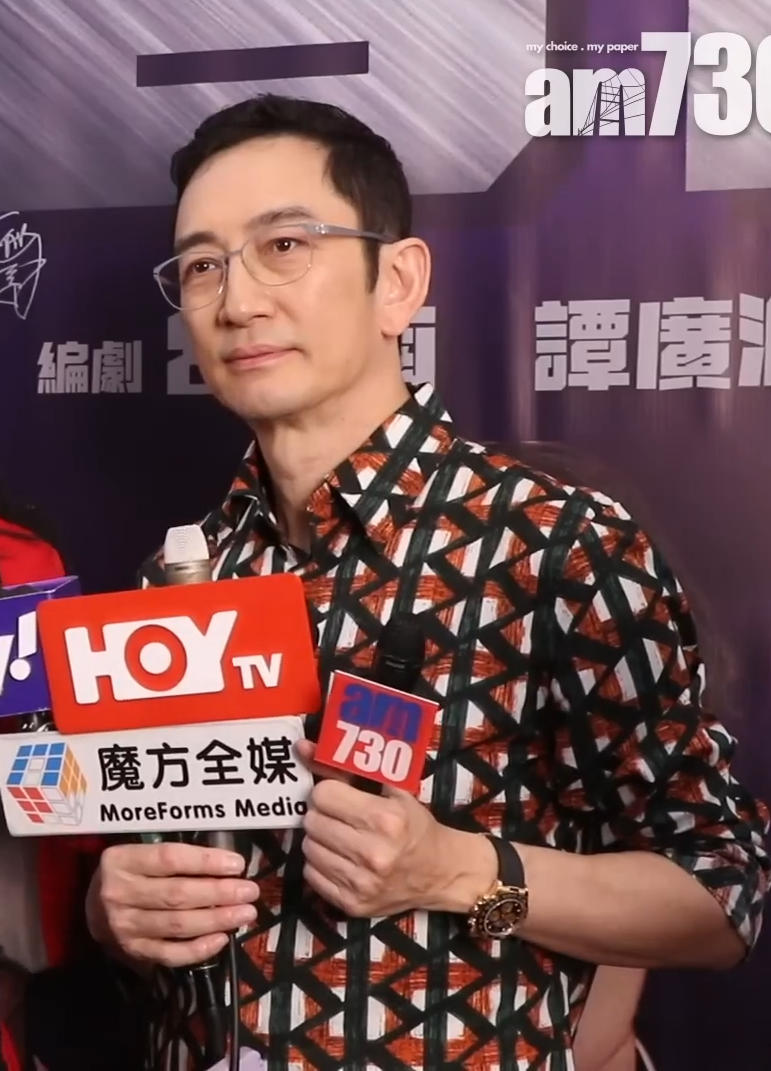
- Ng in 2024
- Born: 19 May 1964 (age 62); British Hong Kong
- Years active: 1986–present
- Spouses: Varintra (m. 1992; div. 1995) Shi Yangzi (m. 2007; div. 2014)
- Children: Cynthia Ng Hei-Yee (b.2008)
- Relatives: Ng Kai Ming (brother)
- Awards: TVB Anniversary Awards – My Favourite On-Screen Partners (Dramas); 1998 Healing Hands; 2001 Healing Hands II; All-Time Most Memorable Male Leading Roles; 1999 Healing Hands; My Favourite Television Character; 2001 Healing Hands II

Chinese name
- Traditional Chinese: 吳啟華
- Simplified Chinese: 吴启华
Transcriptions
Standard Mandarin
- Hanyu Pinyin: Wú Qǐhuá

Lawrence Ng Kai-wah (traditional Chinese: 吳啟華; simplified Chinese: 吴启华, Jyutping: Ng^{4} Kai^{2}-waa^{4}; born 19 May 1964) is a popular TV actor in Hong Kong. His more famous works include the television series Healing Hands and the films Fate Twisters and Sex and Zen.

Ng's older brother is Charlie Ng Kai-ming, who also worked for TVB, but left the acting world in 1994 to become a stockbroker and now owner of a restaurant chain with locations in Hong Kong and China.

== Career ==
Lawrence Ng's first appearance was in 1986 in the TV series The Feud of Two Brothers (流氓大亨); he was cast as villain Chung Wai-shun. Wai-shun had conflicts with his brother, even though the latter cared about him. As the villain, Ng killed his own father but was found not guilty, caused a girl who had a crush on him to become disabled, and left a woman (Kathy Chow) paralyzed. Since his early beginnings in the television industry, he has been an actor of Hong Kong's TVB as a lead male for the great extent of his career.

In 1991, Ng starred in the infamous erotic film Sex and Zen (玉蒲團之偷情寶鑑) alongside Amy Yip. Although the movie was a massive success at the box office and many people, outside of Hong Kong and unfamiliar with his long television career, best identify him for his role in the film, Ng mentioned in an interview that he was embarrassed for having made it (had it not been for certain "trying" reasons) and wishes that he instead be known for his serious character roles in modern and period drama TV series.

Although he continues to be a popular leading actor in Hong Kong, playing only the lead male role, Ng has decided to pursue his talent in business, leaving the full-time entertainment industry, stating that "an actor cannot act forever". He married his girlfriend, Shek Yeung Chi, a model from mainland China after terminating his per-series contract with TVB in May 2007. He continues to operate his business ventures of European restaurants, though some have closed down.

In 2026, Ng revealed that he had licensed the rights to his image to a production company, which is recreating his appearance as a 20-year-old using artificial intelligence for an upcoming film.

== Filmography ==
Year	Title	Role	Notes
1984	The Other Side of the Horizon		
1984	The Duke of Mount Deer		
1985	Sword Stained with Royal Blood		
1985	The Battlefield		
1986	The Feud of Two Brothers	Chung Wai-shun	
1987	The Legend of the Book and the Sword		
1987	The Grand Canal	Yeung Gwong	TV series
1988	Chicken and Duck Talk	Danny Poon	
1988	The Crazy Companies II		
1991	The Banquet		
1991	New Dragon Gate Inn		
1991	Sex and Zen		
1991	Center Stage		
1993	The Underground Banker		
1994	Hail the Judge	Mirror Fong Tong Kan	
1994	A Chinese Torture Chamber Story		
1995	Peace Hotel		
1996	ICAC Investigators 1996		
1996	Outburst		
1997	File of Justice V	SIP Alex Tsui Wai Kit	
1998	A Place of One's Own		
1998	Till When Do Us Apart		
1998	Healing Hands	Dr. Paul Ching Chi Mei	Nominated - TVB Anniversary Award for Best Actor
1999	A Loving Spirit	Michael Ching Ho Yin	
1999	Till When Do Us Part		
1999	My Heart Will Go On		
2000	The Heavenly Sword and the Dragon Saber	Zhang Wuji	
2000	Healing Hands 2	Dr. Paul Ching Chi Mei	Nominated - TVB Anniversary Award for Best Actor
2000	A Taste of Love	Ma You	
2000	When a Man Loves a Woman		
2001	Every Dog Has His Date		
2002	Police Station No. 7		TV series
2002	The Threat of Love II		
2002	The Legendary Siblings 2		
2003	Back to Square One		
2003	Fate Twisters	Lok Tin Shang	
2003	Sai Kung Story		
2005	Healing Hands 3	Dr. Paul Ching Chi Mei	TV series
2006	At Home With Love	Chung Chi-leung	TV series
2006	Mr. 3 Minutes		
2010	72 Tenants of Prosperity		
2010	The Men of Justice	Fong Tsz-ho	TV series
2012	Xuan-Yuan Sword: Scar of Sky	Guyue the Immortal	TV series
2013	The Hippocratic Crush II	Dr. Lokman Lok Man-sang	TV series
2013	7 Assassins	Revolutionary	
2014	Never Dance Alone	Alan Yiu	TV series
2014	Tomorrow Is Another Day	Man Seung-sing	TV series
2015	The Dangerous Affair		
2015	Keeper of Darkness		cameo
2015	The Prospector		
2015	Make Explorations		
2016	Presumed Accidents	George Kiu	
2017	The Secret of S		
2019	Flying Tiger 2	Paul Hoon, Commissioner of Police	
2025	Prism Breaker	Lui Hok Sum	
2026	Deadly Sins	Dr. Hong Lik	Episodes 1-5
TBA	In The Storm		
