= Bowie Lam =

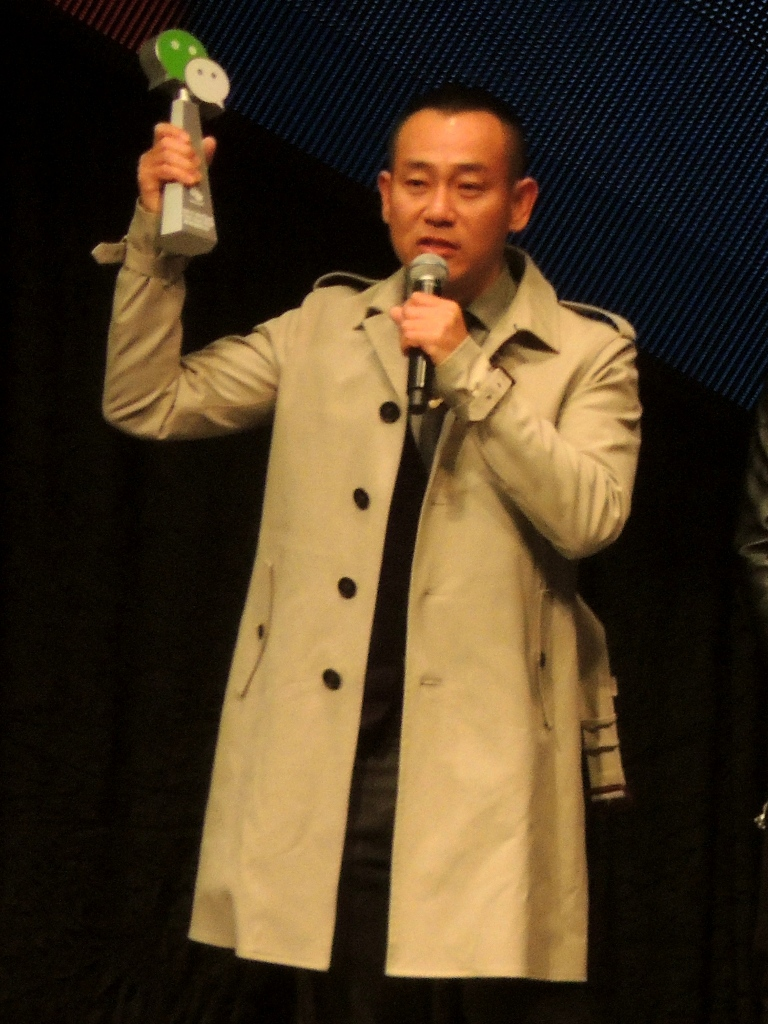
- Lam at the Ultimate Song Chart Awards 2012
- Born: 4 September 1965 (age 60); Alice Ho Miu Ling Nethersole Hospital, Central, British Hong Kong
- Occupations: Actor; singer; rapper
- Years active: 1985–present
- Awards: TVB Anniversary Awards – Best Actor; 2004 War and Beauty My Favourite Television Character; 2003 Vigilante Force; 2004 War and Beauty Asian Television Awards – Best Actor - Drama Series; 2010 Sisters of Pearl

Chinese name
- Traditional Chinese: 林保怡
- Simplified Chinese: 林保怡
Transcriptions
Standard Mandarin
- Hanyu Pinyin: Lín Bǎoyí
Yue: Cantonese
- Jyutping: Lam4 Bou2 Ji4
- Musical career
- Also known as: God of Songs (歌神)
- Genres: Cantopop, Mandopop
- Instrument: drums
- Website: bowielam.cn

Bowie Lam (Chinese: 林保怡, Lam Bo-yee; born 4 September 1965) is a Hong Kong actor with the TVB network. He has starred in several popular dramas including File of Justice and Healing Hands.

Before working in entertainment, Lam held other occupations, including serving in the Hong Kong Police Force for a short time. He made his acting debut in 1986 in Kiss Me Goodbye and his singing debut in 1989.

Lam's acting career took off after joining the major television network TVB in 1991. His first project was a supporting role in the 1992 drama The Greed of Man, which starred Sean Lau, Vivian Chow, Adam Cheng, and Amy Kwok. The Greed of Man as of 2011 remained one of TVB's highest-rated dramas. After The Greed of Man, Lam was featured in TVB dramas File of Justice (1994–1997), Untraceable Evidence (1997 and 1999), and Healing Hands (1998, 2000, and 2005). His major break-out role is considered the 2004 War and Beauty, which was a huge success in Hong Kong and China.

== Television series ==
Year	Title	Role	Awards
1991	The Lady of Iron		
1992	The Greed of Man		
1992	Twins		
1992	Beyond Love		
1992	The Undercover		
1993	Can't Stop Loving You		
1993	The Art of Being Together		
1993	For Home's Sake		
1993	Catwalk		
1994	Eternity	Ling Hak-joeng 凌克洋	
1994	File of Justice III	Joe Li Sai Wang 李世宏	
1994	Forty Something		
1994	ICAC Investigation 1994		
1994	Mary's Choice		
1995	File of Justice IV	Kelvin Fong Wai Ho 方偉豪	
1995	The Unexpected		
1996	Once Upon a Time in Shanghai: The Victory		
1996	Wong Fei Hong Series		
1997	Untraceable Evidence		
1997	A Recipe for the Heart		
1997	File of Justice V	Kelvin Fong Wai Ho 方偉豪	
1998	Healing Hands	Dr. Henry Lai 黎國柱	Nominated - TVB Award for Best Actor (Top 5)
1998	The Warmtime Lovers		
1999	Untraceable Evidence II		
1999	Ultra Protection		
1999	The Disappearance		
2000	Healing Hands II	Dr. Henry Lai 黎國柱	Nominated - TVB Award for Best Actor (Top 5)
2000	The Green Hope		
2000	The Sky is the Limit		
2002	Fight for Love 談談情·練練武	Ng Ka-kit 吳家傑	
2002	Invisible Journey 彩色世界	Cheung Ka-fat 張家發	
2002	Deadly Sting		
2003	Vigilante Force 智勇新警界	Fong Nga-chai 方瓦仔	Won - TVB Award for My Favourite Television Character; Won - Astro Award for My Favourite Character
2004	War and Beauty 金枝慾孽	Suen Bak-yeung 孫白颺	Won - TVB Award for Best Actor; Won - TVB Award for My Favourite Television Character; Nominated - Astro Award for Best Actor (Top 10); Nominated - Astro Award for My Favourite Couple (Top 5); Nominated - Astro Award for My Favourite Theme Song
2004	Kung Fu Soccer		
2004	Unbearable Heights		
2005	Misleading Track 奪命真夫	Leo Law Lei-ho 羅理浩	
2005	Healing Hands III 妙手仁心III	Henry Lai Kwok-chu 黎國柱	Nominated - Astro Award for Best Actor (Top 10); Nominated - Astro Award for My Favourite Character (Top 20)
2005	Always Ready 隨時候命	Benjamin Yip Ching-wan 葉青雲	
2006	The Dance of Passion 火舞黃沙	Yim Man-Hei 閻萬曦	Nominated - TVB Award for Best Actor (Top 5); Nominated - TVB Award for My Favourite Male Character (Top 5); Nominated - Astro Award for Best Actor (Top 10); Nominated - Astro Award for My Favourite Character (Top 20)
2006	CIB Files 刑事情報科	Tony Chung Shun 鍾信	
2008	Angry Angle		
2008-2009	The Gem of Life	Calvin Ko Cheung-shing 高長勝	Nominated - TVB Award for Best Actor (Top 15); Nominated - TVB Award for My Favourite Male Character (Top 15)
2009	ICAC Investigators 2009	Ma Yat-ming	
2010	Sisters of Pearl	Ho Cheung-Hing	Asian Television Awards for Best Drama Performance by an Actor in a Leading Role
2010	Every Move You Make	Linus Yiu Hok-sum	Nominated - TVB Award for Best Actor (Top 15)
2011	River of Wine	Leung Ching-yiu / Sung Ching-yiu	
2011-2012	When Heaven Burns	Joe Lau Chun-hung	
2012	Strangers 6	Fang Hai-lian	
2014	Shianghai Tan Diexue Xiaoxiong	Gu Li-ming	
2014	Tun Shu Xi Jiang	Zhang Han-yong	
2016	Margaret and David: Green Beans		
2020	The Gutter 歎息橋	Thomas Lee 李子勇	Also Executive Producer
2025	D.I.D.12		

=== Host ===
Year	Title	Awards
2006	Homeland Beauty	
2008	Two on the Road	
2010	Duanhuang	
2010	Health Oddities	Nominated - TVB Award for Best Host (Top 5)

== Filmography ==
- Kiss Me Goodbye (1986)
- People's Hero (1987)
- On the Run (1988)
- Give from Heaven (1989)
- Bachelor's Swan Song (1989)
- Doctor Vampire (1991)
- It's Now or Never (1992)
- Rogues from the North (1992)
- Now You See Love, Now You Don't (1992)
- Gun n' Rose (1992)
- The Sting (1992)
- Hard Boiled (1992)
- Once a Cop (1993)
- Man of the Time (1993)
- Rose Rose I Love You (1993)
- Cop Image (1994)
- A Fatal Jump (1994)
- Modern Romance (1994)
- Beginner's Luck (1994)
- The Most Wanted (1994)
- Those Were the Days... (1995)
- The Day That Doesn't Exit Part A... (1995)
- Heaven Can't Wait (1995)
- Faithfully Yours (1995)
- King of Robbery (1996)
- Wild (1996)
- Rich for One Night (1996)
- Passionate Night (1997)
- Lost Control (1997)
- Lawyer Lawyer (1997)
- Evil Instinct (1997)
- Oh! My God (1998)
- Hong Kong X File (1998)
- The Sniper (2009)
- I Corrupt All Cops (2009)
- Better and Better (2013)
- Caught in Trap (2014)
- The Crossing (2014)
- Massagist (2015)
- S Storm (2016)
- La Historia Du Un Amor (2017)
- Bleeding Steel (2017)
- First Night Nerves (2018)
- Wait Here (2018)
- A Guity Conscience (2023)
- Vital Sign (2023)
- In Board Daylight (2023)
- Cesium Fallout (2024)
- The Trier of Fact (TBA)

== TV series theme songs ==
- "Unsuspectingly" (不知不覺), with Kit Chan, opening theme song for Healing Hands II (2000)
- "Love Does Not Leave" (愛不出口), insert song for Healing Hands II (2000)
- "Escape to Life Sky" (逃出生天), opening theme for Fight for Love (2002)
- "Cover Your Eyes to See the World" (闔上眼睛看世界), opening theme for Invisible Journey (2002)
- "Don't Fear the Dark" (不要怕黑), insert song for Invisible Journey (2002)
- "Split" (一字馬), opening theme song for Vigilante Force (2003)
- "If You Were My Lover" (如果你是我的愛人), insert song for Vigilante Force (2003)
- "Children" (兒女), opening theme song for War and Beauty (2004)
- "Arsenic" (砒霜), insert song for War and Beauty (2004)
- "The Eagle Soars" (飛鷹翱翔(完整)), ending theme for Always Ready (2005)
- "With You Every Day" (和你的每一天), theme song for Healing Hands III (2005)
- "The Wrong Gray Is Correct" (灰色錯對), opening theme song for Misleading Track (2005)
- "Intelligence" (情報), opening theme song for CIB Files (2006)
- "Wind Sand" (風沙), opening theme song for The Dance of Passion (2006)
- "The Two Words of Love" (相戀兩個字) with Gigi Lai, ending theme song for The Gem of Life (2008)
- "Sam Chung Yau So" (心中有數) opening theme song for Every Move You Make (2010)
- "Youthful Ignorance" (年少無知) with Moses Chan and Kenny Wong, ending theme song for When Heaven Burns (2011)

Awards and achievements
TVB Anniversary Awards
Preceded by Roger Kwok for Square Pegs	Best Actor; 2004 for War and Beauty	Succeeded by Roger Kwok for Life Made Simple
Asian Television Awards
Preceded by Adrian Pang for Red Thread	Best Drama Performance by an Actor; 2010 for Sister of Pearl	Succeeded by Kevin Cheng for Ghetto Justice
