= Healing Hands II =

- Promo poster
- 妙手仁心II
- Genre: Medical drama
- Starring: Lawrence Ng; Bowie Lam; Flora Chan; Ada Choi; Yoyo Mung; Moses Chan; Kit Chan; Fiona Yuen; Maggie Shiu; Raymond Cho
- Country of origin: Hong Kong
- Original language: Cantonese
- No. of episodes: 40

Production
- Running time: 45 minutes (approx.)

Original release
- Network: TVB
- Release: November 20, 2000 – January 12, 2001

Related
- Healing Hands (1998); Healing Hands III (2005)

Healing Hands II is a 2000 Hong Kong medical drama television series that was made by Hong Kong's television broadcast company TVB after Healing Hands’s success. It was directed by Jonathan Chik, mainly cast by Lawrence Ng, Bowie Lam, Flora Chan, Ada Choi and Yoyo Mung. The series mainly describes a group of medical staff, including their attitude towards work and thought, which reflects on different medical cases. It was broadcast on November 20, 2000, in TVB Jade. It is the second installment in the Healing Hands series.

== Synopsis ==
Following the storyline of Healing Hands, Henry (Bowie Lam), the unruly doctor, and his clever and calm lawyer girlfriend Annie (Flora Chan) still keep as a perfect lover yet don’t want to live together. On the other hand, Annie’s brother Gilbert (William So), passes away of Aids. A few months before his death, he picked a puppy on the street and gave it in different homes for caring. Peter Cheung (Nick Cheung) and Cheung Suk-Yan (Angela Tong) are married in U.K and got settled. Another couple, the talkative and positive Joe Cheung (Steven Ma) and Helen Ling (Astrid Chan), they work in a faraway village in Africa. Although other guys are separated by time, Paul Ching (Lawrence Ng) still devotes to his job and keeps his life motto of saving patients from death. He also waits for his girlfriend Jackie Tong (Ada Choi) to awake from two years’ coma. Under the management of Steven Law (Joe Cheung), the president of the hospital, everything in the hospital goes smoothly and peacefully. Such peace is finally challenged because of three young and talented doctors’ presence in the hospital. When they come to the hospital, they not only bring new laughter and motivations into the group, but also give a deeper understanding of life. Tracy Ho (Yoyo Mung), a rich girl, is the lover of the libertine doctor M.C Lam (Moses Chan) who also comes from a rich family. However, when she meets Paul, she finally realizes what kind of love can last forever and she decides to leave M.C for a better relationship. During a long period of working and hanging out, Henry and his assistant Dorothy Yuen (Kit Chan) can’t resist the temptation of intimacy but secretly develop a relationship behind Annie. Gradually, Dorothy feels so guilty for Annie and leaves Hong Kong alone. A few months later, Henry hears the news that Dorothy gets pregnant and he assumes that he is the father of her baby, and then he has no choice but to tell the truth to his girlfriend Annie.

== Characters analysis ==
=== Paul Ching – Lawrence Ng ===
Profession: Chief of Service of neurosurgery Characteristics: He is upright and kindhearted, but speechless and passive. Paul is highly confident and responsible for his work, which is the same way he treats relationship. When his girlfriend Jackie Tong is in a coma after a surgery, he persistently stays by her side. As he blames himself for causing Jackie’s coma by delaying two minutes’ surgery, Paul becomes keen in time and he requires his colleagues to obey punctuality. During Jackie’s two-year coma, Paul devotes himself to the “coma” subject, wishing that he can do something for Jackie. Background: Paul never gives up Jackie and he always waits for the miracle. Jackie finally wakes up after a surgery and comes back to life. Finally Paul and Jackie live a happy life after two years. Just when they are ready to get married, Jackie dies in a serious accident, leaving Paul in desperation again. After losing the love of his life, Paul finally meets the third woman in his life, Tracy Ho.

=== Henry Lai – Bowie Lam ===
Profession: Chief of Service of the emergency and trauma Characteristics: He is professional and confident, calm and decisive, smart and responsible. Henry is good at analyzing and understanding people and things. As he plays his own rule and seldom shows his motion, he is misunderstood as a cool and pride man to others. He is always surrounded by many women because he behaves like a playboy, which also causes him dozens of trouble. Background: Henry is the only son in his family so he never worries about money and he hardly cares about others. Since he graduates from medical school with honor, he always shows his amazing talent at work. Henry’s particular personalities give him fortune for attracting female, which even leads to one woman’s suicide for him. After the case, he feels so guilty that he totally loses confidence in building a relationship with woman. When he meets Annie, he decides to be loyal to her but live separately. Things go smoothly and successfully till Henry meets his assistant Dorothy. Henry finally makes a terrible mistake by hurting two women.

=== Annie Kong – Flora Chan ===
Profession: barrister Characteristics: She is outgoing, resolute and honest to people. She is full of energy for love, life and sports. Annie is absolutely loyal and conservative to relationship because she is afraid of being hurt in love. So she always pretends to be careless about feelings. She is attractive to man for her mysterious temperament. Background: She grows up with her brother depend, so they have a very good relationship with each other. To be a barrister is her dream. She gets a crush on Henry when they are in university and they once hold ambiguous feelings to each other. After graduation, she successfully becomes a barrister. In a coincidence of meeting Henry, she feels the past feelings burn and appear in her deep heart once again. Finally, they become lovers. However, she painfully finds that Henry and his assistant has a secret love and now she has a huge decision to make on her way to love.

=== Jackie Tong – Ada Choi ===
Profession: Associate Consultant in emergency and trauma Characteristics: She is cheerful, straightforward and impulsive. These personalities lead to her immatureness for dealing things. As she is honest and trustful by others, she has many friends. Jackie is energetic for life since she knows how to work hard and enjoy life. She is kind-hearted and friendly to care about people. In a relationship, she is active and straightforward to express the feelings in her heart. Background: Due to Jackie’s surgery, she stays in coma for two years. After her waking up, she and Paul finally get together and have a period of intensive romance. Since Jackie has to get a test for emergency doctor because of her coma, she abandons herself in studying and researching as she really doesn’t want to be left behind when noticing her friends’ success in medical field. But a terrible accident happens to Jackie and her friend, causing a serious injury on them. In order to take the responsibility of a doctor, she asks doctors to help her friend first, but she loses her perfect time for saving her life.

== Cast ==
=== Main cast ===
- Lawrence Ng as Paul Ching Chi-mei (程至美)
- Bowie Lam as Henry Lai Kwok-chu (黎國柱)
- Flora Chan as Annie Kong Sun-yuet (江新月)
- Ada Choi as Jackie Tong Chi-lai (唐姿禮)
- Yoyo Mung as Tracy Ho Sum-yin (何心妍)
- Moses Chan as M.C. Lam Man-chi (林敏智)
- Kit Chan as Dorothy Yuen Long-ping (阮朗平)
- Maggie Shiu as Anson Man On-sang (萬安生)
- Fiona Yuen as Suki Man Ning-sang (萬寧生)
- Raymond Cho as Chris Heung Chung-yan (向眾仁)

=== Recurring cast ===
- Michael Tong as Edmond Tam Yung-ming (譚勇明)
- Cheung Tung Cho as Steven Law Hau-chai (羅孝齊)
- Priscilla Ku as Fion Wan Mei-kwan (溫美君)
- Felix Lok as Ho Sau-yan (何守仁)
- Kenny Wong as Ho Tak-kwong (何德廣)
- Yvonne Lam as Eva Lee Yee-wa (李伊華)

=== Guest stars ===
- Steven Ma as Joe Cheung Ka-yu (張家裕)
- Sheren Tang as Tsui Ka-wing (徐嘉詠)

== Influences ==
The 2020 film All's Well, End's Well 2020 features a similar-sounding version of the theme music played in a scene where the main heroes (disguising as doctors) saved an unconscious man from getting murdered by the gangster's minions.
