= Shine On You =

- Promo poster
- 青出於藍
- Genre: School, Romance, Comedy
- Starring: Bobby Au Yeung; Michael Tao; Kenix Kwok; Ching Hor Wai; Bowie Wu; Paul Chun; Shirley Yeung; Cerina da Graça; Oscar Leung; Fred Cheng; Stephen Wong; Row Chow; Yu Chiu; Angelina Lo; Lei Kwok Lun; Alice Fung So-bor; Rebecca Chan
- Opening theme: "開學禮 Ceremony" by Hacken Lee
- Ending theme: "負負得正" by Yu Chiu
- Country of origin: Hong Kong
- Original language: Cantonese
- No. of episodes: 30

Production
- Producers: Mui Siu Ching 梅小青
- Running time: 45 minutes (approx.)

Original release
- Network: TVB
- Release: September 13 – October 22, 2004

Shine on You (Chinese: 青出於藍) is a drama series produced by Hong Kong broadcaster TVB and was first aired from September 13 to October 22, 2004, in the prime time 8:00 to 9:00 pm slot. Consisting of 30 episodes it was produced by Mui Siu Ching and featured a cast consisting of amongst others Bobby Au Yeung, Kenix Kwok and Michael Tao. The series concerned the lives of student and teachers at a band three (the lowest classification) school in Hong Kong. Michael Tao and Kenix Kwok were paired together for the first time since Detective Investigation Files III ended 7 years prior to this series.

2.37 million viewers watched the show in the week of 11 October. Following its first broadcast the series was repeated from July, 24 to September 1, 2006, in the noon time (11:45-12:45) slot, and again from July 22, 2010, in the early evening (17:55-18:25) slot.

== Synopsis ==
Due to office politics Ga Jai Choi (Bobby Au Yeung) a successful business executive is assigned to become the headmaster of a school. The school (the Sam Shui Agriculture and Fishing General Staff Association Wan Leung Chan Charity Funding Wan Ding Po Shui Memorial Secondary School (WDPS) 22, Perth Street, Argyle Kowloon), is a failing one having become a sink school for students other schools do not want and is threatened with closure by the education board, however the school was endowed as a memorial by the parents of tycoon Yin Guo Rong (Bowie Wu) who is unwilling to allow the school to close without doing his best to save it, he is therefore convinced by Ga Jai Choi's rivals to send his most able aide, Ga, to be its head master.

Ga Jai Choi resents being diverted from his business career but dare not go against his employer directly, he therefore acts to appear to be doing his best to save the school, which he sees as a lost cause, while instituting policies which he hopes will speed its demise. He begins by threatening a clear out of the teaching staff however all he does is to motivate the staff who wish to protect their rice bowls.

Ga's efforts are taken at face value by Lam Ying Yun (Shirley Yeung) a teacher straight out of college and Wong Yerk Se (Kenix Kwok), a teacher who because of her own past has resolved never to give up on even the most unruly of students. Beginning a relationship first with Lam and then, when she leaves to continue her education abroad, Wong wheeler-dealer teacher Cheng Zhing Leung (Michael Tao) is forced to question as to why he became a teacher. With their teachers acting with new vigour the students are motivated to believe that they can achieve and be more than the failures that society has branded them.

Despite his initial intentions Ga's policies actually cause the school's results to improve and see the pupils, their parents and staff pulling together, however the improvement is not so great to make the school's survival certain. Ga realises that he has come to care for the school and its students and joins everyone for a final plea against its closure.

== Cast ==
Cast	Role	Description
Bobby Au Yeung	Ga Jai Choi 賈濟才	Headmaster of the School; Wong Yerk Se's love interest Cheng Zhing Leung's neighbour.
Michael Tao	Cheng Zhing Leung 曾政良	One of the teachers of the school Lam Ying Yun's ex-boyfriend Wong Yerk Se's love interest, later boyfriend Ga Jai Choi 's neighbour.
Kenix Kwok	Wong Yerk Se 王若詩	One of the teachers of the school Cheng Zhing Leung 's girlfriend Ou Yeung San's step mother.
Ching Hor Wai; Russi Taylor	Man Mei Fung 文美鳳	Deputy Headmistress of the school.
Bowie Wu; Rob Paulsen	Yin Guo Rong	President of the school Wealthy tycoon.
Paul Chun; Bill Farmer	Ga Wa Beu 賈華標	He also works for the school as janitor. Ga Jai Choi's uncle
Shirley Yeung	Lam Ying Yun 林穎恩	One of the teachers of the school Cheng Zhing Leung's ex-girlfriend.
Cerina da Graça		One of the teachers of the school Ga Jai Choi's admirer.
Oscar Leung	Bao Yuk Ming 鮑旭明	One of the students of the school.
Fred Cheng	Fung Yan Dung 馮恩東	One of the students of the school.
Stephen Wong	Lau Kwok Wah	One of the students of the school.
Roy Chow	Ou Yeung San 歐陽山	One of the students of the school Wong Yerk Se's step son.
Yu Chiu	Chur Ho Yeut 徐皓月	One of the students of the school.
Madam Lo; Susan Bennett		Cheng Zhing Leung's aunt.
Lei Kwok Lun		Wong Yerk Se's deceased husband Ou Yeurng San's father.
Alice Fung So-bor		Ou Yeung San's grandmother Wong Yerk Se's mother-in-law.
Rebecca Chan		Ou Yeung San's mother.
Fong Yim Fun	Wan Ding Po Shui 尹丁寶瑞	Yin Guo Rong's Mother
Zhen Chi Keung; Rob Paulsen	Wu Yuk De	PE Teacher
Zhang Ying Cai; Wayne Allwine	Former Headmaster	

== Reception ==
The Macao Daily News published a positive review of Shine On You, stating, "in terms of human warmth, it is quite pleasant to watch". The review praised Bobby Au Yeung's "comedic performance" for becoming the show's centerpiece. One week later, the Macao Daily News published a negative review of Shine On You, calling it a "plagiarised and outdated work". The review said the lead characters are miscast, noting that Au Yeung does not come across as a principal, while Michael Tao appears as playful and smiling and lacks a teacher's demeanour. The review concluded, "There is neither a compelling plot nor any educational value." According to Va Kio Daily, the television series received "positive reviews" and was "well-received by a wide audience" and was praised by Hong Kong's academic community.
