= List of The Confidant characters =

The characters of The Confidant, a 2012 Hong Kong television drama produced by TVB, are both fictional and real-life characters living during the reign of the Tongzhi Emperor, the tenth emperor of the Qing Dynasty. The drama is a dramatisation on the life of imperial eunuch Li Lianying, one of the most powerful figures of the latter years of the Qing Dynasty.

== Main characters ==
=== Imperial eunuchs ===
Character names are in Cantonese romanisation.

Name	Actor/actress	Historical basis	First appearance	Last appearance
Lei Lin-ying (李連英)	Wayne Lai	Li Lianying	Episode 1	TBA
Born Lei Ying-tai (李英泰), Lin-ying was born in Hejian Fu, and is the second of three sons to Lei Yuk and Cho Kuk, a couple who owns a small leather store in the capital. In order to pay for his father's gambling deaths, Lin-ying got castrated and entered the palace to become a eunuch. He served in the King-yan Palace, which lived the lonely and young Dowager Concubine Yuen, before moving to the Cheung-chun Palace to serve Empress Dowager Chee-hei, who is attracted by Lin-ying's intelligence and loyalty. Accommodating and friendly, Lin-ying makes many lifelong friends within King-yan Palace. Lin-ying is also best friends with On Tak-hoi, Chee-hei's personal eunuch and close confidant. Together, Lin-yin and Tak-hoi are the students of the elderly and wise Lau Dor-sang, a eunuch stationed at the Forbidden City's archival room.
On Tak-hoi (安德海)	Raymond Cho	An Dehai	Episode 1	Episode 26
At a young age, Tak-hoi was sold to the palace to become a eunuch. A student of Lau Dor-sang, Tak-hoi is also the best friend of Lei Lin-ying, a eunuch serving King-yan Palace. Tak-hoi risked his life to help Empress Dowagers Chee-hei and Chee-on resume their power in court, winning the trust of both empresses. Chee-hei appoints Tak-hoi as her personal eunuch, and he also becomes her one of her closest friends and confidants. Compassionate and ambitious, Tak-hoi is displeased with Chan Fuk abusing his powers as Forbidden City's Head Eunuch, and he strives to take over his position. Accused of having affair with Chee-hei and is beheaded.
Yiu Sheung-hei (姚雙喜)	Raymond Wong Ho-yin	N/A	Episode 1	TBA
Born to a family of medical practitioners, Sheung-hei is a simple and honest eunuch who serves the medical department of the Forbidden City. After the death of his father, his family was thrown into poverty, and Sheung-hei was forced to become a eunuch to provide for his family. Sheung-hei becomes a close friend of Lei Lin-ying after the latter saves him from a severe punishment for trying to escape the palace to see his dying mother.
Ling Tim-sau (凌添壽)	Edwin Siu	N/A	Episode 1	TBA
Also serving in the King-yan Palace, Tim-sau is the student of Lei Lin-ying. In order to pay for his family's expenses, Tim-sau accumulated many gambling debts. He cherishes his mentor-friendship relationship with Lin-ying, and he vows to serve by Lin-ying's side forever. When Lin-ying was asked to serve Empress Dowager Chee-hei, Tim-sau also followed. Tim-sau idolises On Tak-hoi, Chee-hei's confidant, and hopes to one day reach the same success as him. Tim-sau had a pure and innocent heart, but he is later seduced by fame and wealth, and is willing to overstep the bounds to reach his goals.
Pang Sam-shun (彭三順)	Power Chan	N/A	Episode 1	TBA
The nephew of Head Eunuch Chan Fuk, Sam-shun is a seventh-ranking eunuch of the management bureau who often abuses his relationship with the former to collect favors and to taunt his subordinates. When medical department's eunuch, Yiu Sheung-hei, requests for a vacation leave to visit his dying mother, Sam-shun refused his request due to monetary loss. When Sheung-hei attempts to escape, Sam-shun grabs an entire team of eunuchs to capture him. Sam-shun often competes with Lei Lin-ying and On Tak-hoi for power.
Chan Fuk (陳福)	Elliot Ngok	N/A	Episode 2	Episode 30
Appointed by Empress Dowager Chee-on, Chan Fuk is the fourth-ranking Head Eunuch of the Forbidden City. Chan Fuk entered the palace at a very young age, and has been through three eras of reign. Chan Fuk dislikes Empress Dowager Chee-hei, believing that she is a threat to the Aisin-Gioro clan, no more less to the entire Qing empire. Chan Fuk works closely with Prince Kung, Chee-hei's brother-in-law, to weaken Chee-hei's power in court.
Lau Dor-sang (劉多生)	Chung King-fai	Liu Duosheng	Episode 1	TBA
The teacher of Lei Lin-ying and On Tak-hoi, Lau Dor-sang is an elderly and wise eunuch who serves in the Forbidden City's archival room.

=== Palace maids ===
Character names are in Cantonese romanisation.

Name	Actor/actress	Historical basis	First appearance	Last appearance
Erdet Sin-yung (額爾德特·倩蓉)	Nancy Wu	N/A	Episode 1	Episode 32
Concubine Dowager Yuen's personal maid and her confidant. Sin-yung served in the King-yan Palace for much of her life. Independent and courageous, all of the servants in King-yan Palace look up to her, including Lei Lin-ying. Sin-yung strikes a romance with the handsome Pak-lun, a palace guard. After Pak-lun leaves for war, Sin-yung discovers that she is pregnant. As all palace maids are expected to retire by the time they turn twenty five years of age, Sin-yung believes that she will be able to escape punishment. However, Sin-yung suffers a miscarriage after she is brutally beaten by Sam-shun.
Tujin Kwai-so (都錦·桂蘇)	Helen Ma	N/A	Episode 1	Episode 31
Also known as So Mor-mor (蘇嬤嬤), So is Empress Dowager Chee-on's nanny, and is currently serving in the Chung-sui Palace as Chee-on's confidant. So is loyal but unscrupulous, and treats Chee-on's enemies as her own.

=== Royal Aisin-Gioro clan ===
Character names are in Cantonese romanisation.

Name	Actor or actress	Historical basis	First appearance	Last appearance
Empress Dowager Chee-hei (慈禧太后)	Michelle Yim	Empress Dowager Cixi	Episode 1	TBA
Also regarded as the "West Empress Dowager" and the title "Holy Mother Empress Dowager", Chee-hei is the de facto ruler of the Qing Empire. She was selected by the Ham-fung Emperor as a concubine and gave birth to his only son, who becomes the Tung-chi Emperor upon Ham-fung's death. Chee-hei is known for opposing westernisation.
Empress Dowager Chee-on (慈安太后)	Maggie Shiu	Empress Dowager Ci'an	Episode 1	Episode 33
Also regarded as the "East Empress Dowager" and the title "Empress Mother Empress Dowager", Chee-on is the de facto ruler of the Qing Empire, along with Empress Dowager Chee-hei.
Tung-chi Emperor (同治帝)	Pako Au (as a child); Oscar Leung (as a teenager)	Tongzhi Emperor	Episode 2 (as a child); Episode 18 (as a teenager)	Episode 33
A lively youth with a creative and brilliant mind, but because his mother, Empress Dowager Chee-hei, has the real hand in power, Tung-chi never had an affluent influence over court affairs. Tung-chi attempts political reform, but his efforts are shot down by his mother. Tung-chi is much closer to Empress Dowager Chee-on, and he also chooses Chee-on's niece to be his wife rather than his mother's own selection.
Empress Ka-shun (嘉順皇后)	Natalie Tong	Empress Xiaozheyi	Episode 19	TBA
Born of the Alute clan, the empress is the daughter of Empress Dowager Chee-on's older cousin. Although at least two years Tung-chi's senior, Tung-chi decides to marry Ka-shun as his empress as opposed to his own mother's selection.
Prince Kung (恭親王)	Cheung Kwok-keung	Prince Gong	Episode 1	TBA
Also known as the Sixth Imperial Prince, Prince Kung is the sixth son of the Do-kwong Emperor. Prince Kung expected himself to succeed the throne after the death of his older brother, the Ham-fung Emperor. When Empress Dowager Chee-hei pushes her son, the five-year-old Tung-chi, to the throne, Prince Kung turns to regard Chee-hei to be the despot of the weakening Qing empire.
Princess Sau-chong Wo-shek (壽莊和碩公主)	Aimee Chan	Princess Shouzhuang of the Second Rank	Episode 3	Episode 28
The sickly night daughter of the Do-kwong Emperor, and the Tung-chi Emperor's aunt. The princess is bored of her life in the palace and develops an attraction to the eunuch, Yiu Sheung-hei. Dies in Ep:28.
Imperial Dowager Concubine Yuen (婉太嬪)	Selena Li	Imperial Consort Wan	Episode 1	Episode 5
Concubine Yuen is a neglected concubine of the former Ham-fung Emperor. She falls in love with the handsome Peking opera singer, Yuk-jun, and he sires a son with her. Chee-hei discovers that her son was not Ham-fung's biological son, and orders her infant son to be killed. Yuen committed suicide (Ep:5) after being exiled by Chee-hei for attempt to dethrone her.

== Secondary characters ==
- Cilla Kung as Consort Wai (慧妃), a concubine of the Tung-chi Emperor. Empress Dowager Chee-hei wants Consort Wai to be empress, but Tung-chi ultimately chooses Empress Dowager Chee-on's niece, who becomes Empress Ka-shun.
- Tsui Wing as Guwalgiya Sing-po (蘇完瓜爾佳·勝保), a general and Prince Kung's assistant.
- Lo Chun-shun as Law On-tai (羅安康), a eunuch serving in King-yan Palace.
- Fred Cheng as Lei Wing-ning (利永寧), a eunuch serving in King-yan Palace.
- Au Sui-wai as Prince Shun (醇親王), also known as the Seventh Imperial Prince, Prince Kung's younger brother.
- Eric Li as Pak-lun (伯倫), a palace guard and Sin-yung's lover.
- Peter Pang as Kwai-cheung (葉赫那拉·桂祥), Empress Dowager Chee-hei's younger brother.
- Leo Tsang as Woyan (烏齊格里·倭仁), a court official.
- Steve Lee as Powan (索綽絡·寶鋆), a court official.
- Meini Cheung as Sixth Princess Consort (六福晉), the wife of Prince Kung.
- Angel Chiang as Siu Chai (小釵), a prostitute who becomes On Tak-hoi's wife.
- Lau Kong as Lei Yuk (李玉), Lei Lin-ying's father.
- Alice Fung So-bor as Cho Kuk (曹菊), Lei Lin-ying's mother.
- Vin Choi as Yuk-jun (玉俊), a Peking Opera singer, and Consort Yuen's lover.
- Giovanni Mok as Lei On-tai (李安泰), Lei Lin-ying's younger teenage brother.

== See also ==
- The Confidant
