= TVB Anniversary Award for Best Supporting Actor =

Hong Kong television award

- Awarded for: "Best Performance by an Actor in a Supporting Role"
- Country: Hong Kong
- Presented by: Television Broadcasts Limited (TVB)
- First award: 2005
- Currently held by: Matthew Ho - The Queen of News 2 (2025)
- Website: http://birthday.tvb.com/

The TVB Anniversary Award for Best Actor in a Supporting Role is one of the TVB Anniversary Awards presented annually by Television Broadcasts Limited (TVB) to recognize an actor who has delivered an outstanding performance in Hong Kong television dramas throughout the designated year. This award was not introduced to the awards ceremony until 2005, eight years after its establishment.

== Winners and nominees ==
TVB nominates at least ten actors for the category each year. The following table lists only the actors who have made it to the top five nominations during the designated awards ceremony. Top nominations were not announced in 2013.

Table key
†	Indicates the winner

=== 2000s ===
Year	Actor	Drama	Role(s)
2005 (9th)	Ha Yu †	My Family	Man Chiu-kit
2005 (9th)	Paul Chun	Love Bond	Kei Tin-man
2005 (9th)	Wayne Lai	Scavengers' Paradise	Tse Kwan-min
2005 (9th)	David Chiang	Revolving Doors of Vengeance	Fred Cheng
2005 (9th)	Kenneth Ma	Into Thin Air	Koon Ching-wan
2006 (10th)	Kenny Wong †	The Dance of Passion	Sung Tung-yeung
2006 (10th)	Wayne Lai	Safe Guards	Sheung Chung
2006 (10th)	Johnson Lee	Welcome to the House	Cheung Yat-moon
2006 (10th)	Chung King-fai	The Dance of Passion	Yim Kwok-yip
2006 (10th)	Jack Wu	To Grow with Love	Lam Koon-hei
2007 (11th)	Louis Yuen †	Heart of Greed	Ling Bor
2007 (11th)	Paul Chun	Glittering Days	Chu Tai-kat
2007 (11th)	Hui Shiu-hung	Dicey Business	Chow Fuk-wing
2007 (11th)	Wong Cho-lam	Best Selling Secrets	Lau Wah
2007 (11th)	Lawrence Ng Wai-kwok	The Drive of Life	Choi Chai-sang
2008 (12th)	Wayne Lai †	The Gentle Crackdown II	Tai Chung-man / Tai Chung-mo
2008 (12th)	Tsui Wing	Best Selling Secrets	Tony Ko
2008 (12th)	Derek Kok	Wars of In-Laws II	CC Wong
2008 (12th)	Chow Chung	Moonlight Resonance	Chung Fan-dat
2008 (12th)	Him Law	Your Class or Mine	Fan Pui-tung
2009 (13th)	Michael Tse †	E.U.	Leung Siu-tong (Laughing Gor)
2009 (13th)	Elliot Ngok	The Gem of Life	Martin Ho
2009 (13th)	Ngo Ka-nin	Rosy Business	Chiang Bit-man
2009 (13th)	Joseph Lee	Beyond the Realm of Conscience	General Ma Yuen-chi
2009 (13th)	Kenneth Ma	Born Rich	Sha Po-loi

=== 2010s ===
Year	Actor	Drama	Role(s)
2010 (14th)	Mak Cheung-ching †	No Regrets	Leung Fei-fan
2010 (14th)	Ron Ng	OL Supreme	Ling Siu-kei (Ah K)
2010 (14th)	Dominic Lam	A Fistful of Stances	Wing Tak
2010 (14th)	Raymond Wong Ho-yin	No Regrets	Yeung Yeung
2010 (14th)	Ngo Ka-nin	No Regrets	Tong Kat (Sparerib)
2011 (15th)	Ben Wong †	Lives of Omission	Tang Kwok-ban (Spicy Ginger)
2011 (15th)	Jazz Lam	Ghetto Justice	George Mike Jr. (MJ)
2011 (15th)	Derek Kok	Lives of Omission	SGT Szeto Hoi (Dog Head)
2011 (15th)	Ngo Ka-nin	River of Wine	Sung Chi-tsun
2011 (15th)	Joseph Lee	Forensic Heroes III	Luk Tsan-Kwong (Rev Luminous)
2012 (16th)	Jerry Ku †	Divas in Distress	So Gay
2012 (16th)	Power Chan	The Confidant	Pang Sam-Shun
2013 (17th)	Benz Hui †	Bounty Lady	Heung Sin-nam
2014 (18th)	Ram Chiang †	Come On, Cousin	Ko Yam
2014 (18th)	Louis Cheung	Black Heart White Soul	Marco Ma
2014 (18th)	Hui Shiu-hung	Line Walker	Tam Foon-Hei (Foon-hei Gor)
2014 (18th)	Vincent Wong	Tomorrow Is Another Day	Kiu Ching-kiu
2014 (18th)	Raymond Cho	Overachievers	Andy Cheung-sing
2015 (19th)	Willie Wai †	Lord of Shanghai	Mak Hon-Lam
2015 (19th)	Ram Chiang	Raising the Bar	Woody Lam Sam-muk
2015 (19th)	Timothy Cheng	Raising the Bar	Duncan Yum Chun-yip
2015 (19th)	Pierre Ngo	Ghost of Relativity	Charlie Chan
2015 (19th)	Joseph Lee	Under the Veil	Lung Mau
2016 (20th)	Raymond Cho †	Short End of the Stick	Chan Siu-Fung
2016 (20th)	Hugo Ng	Brother's Keeper II	Ko Tin-Tsau
2016 (20th)	Luk Wing (6-Wing)	Two Steps from Heaven	Ted Koo
2017 (21st)	Joel Chan †	The Unholy Alliance	Kent Ling
2017 (21st)	Andrew Yuen Man-kit	My Unfair Lady	Yau Chun-Kit
2017 (21st)	Owen Cheung	Legal Mavericks	"GoGo" Kuk Yat-ha
2017 (21st)	Jimmy Au	The Unholy Alliance	Yik Siu-Fung
2017 (21st)	Anthony Ho	The Exorcist's Meter	Lung Mau
2018 (22nd)	Oscar Leung †	Omg, Your Honour	Charles Chiu
2018 (22nd)	Bob Cheung	Life on the Line	Lui Kim Hung
2018 (22nd)	Tsui Wing	Who Wants A Baby?	Ben Yip Chi-Yoon
2018 (22nd)	Raymond Cho	The Learning Curve of a Warlord	Koo Lok Lo / Koo Seen Sang
2018 (22nd)	Wai Ka Hung	Deep in the Realm of Conscience	
2019 (23rd)	Kalok Chow †	Lo and Behold	Kam Shing-on (On Zai)
2019 (23rd)	Stanley Cheung	Lo and Behold	Gung Yip
2019 (23rd)	Matthew Ho	Big White Duel	Dr. Max Poon Wai-Tak
2019 (23rd)	David Chiang	Big White Duel	Dr. Lui Chung-Hok
2019 (23rd)	Tony Hung	Wonder Women	Yeung Wang-Lap

=== 2020s ===
Year	Actor	Drama	Role(s)
2020 (24th)	Jason Lau	Hong Kong Love Stories	Chan Hon Sing
2020 (24th)	Timothy Cheng	Death By Zero	Chan Cha Lei
2020 (24th)	Brian Chu	Al Cappuccino	Luk Chau
2020 (24th)	Tsui Wing	Al Cappuccino	Chung Chi-Sum
2020 (24th)	Hui Shiu-hung	Line Walker: Bull Fight	Chum Foon Hei
2021 (25th)	Brian Chu	Take Two	Pok Bo Gim / Park Bo Gum / "Gum"
2021 (25th)	Jonathan Cheung	Sinister Beings	Ngai Tsz-lok
2021 (25th)	Tyson Chak	AI Romantic	Rocky
2021 (25th)	Him Law	Kids' Lives Matter	Dr. Max Man Pak-Hei
2021 (25th)	Hugo Wong	The Ringmaster	Yip Ying Fung
2022 (26th)	Eric Tang †	Get On A Flat	
2022 (26th)	Jonathan Cheung	Your Highness	
2022 (26th)	Bob Lam	The War of Beauties	
2022 (26th)	Ricco Ng	Communion	
2022 (26th)	Lee Shing-Cheong	Ghost Cleansing Ltd	

== Records ==
Most top nominations

Nominations	Actor
3	Paul Chun
3	Wayne Lai
3	Kenneth Ma
3	Hui Shiu-hung
3	Ngo Ka-nin

Age superlatives

Record	Actor	TV drama	Age (in years)
Oldest winner	Hui Shiu-hung	Bounty Lady	65
Oldest top nominee	Chow Chung	Moonlight Resonance	76
Youngest winner	Kalok Chow	Lo and Behold	24
Youngest top nominee	Kalok Chow	Lo and Behold	24
Youngest top nominee	Him Law	Your Class or Mine	24
