= Edwin Siu =

Hong Kong singer and actor

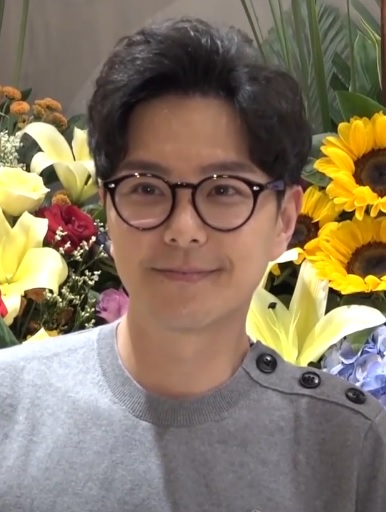
- Siu in November 2019
- Born: Siu Kam Lun; 23 March 1977 (age 49); Hong Kong
- Occupations: Singer; actor
- Years active: 2002–present
- Notable work: Brother's Keeper; Madam Cutie On Duty; Two Steps from Heaven; A General, a Scholar and a Eunuch
- Spouse: Priscilla Wong (m. 2018)
- Children: 1
- Awards: TVB Anniversary Awards – Most Popular Onscreen Partnership; 2017 A General, a Scholar and a Eunuch; 2018 Two Men In A Kitchen; Best Host; 2017 DoDo Goes Shopping sr 2
- Musical career
- Genres: Cantopop
- Instrument: Vocals
- Label: Music Nation Group (2002–2004)

Chinese name
- Traditional Chinese: 蕭正楠
- Simplified Chinese: 萧正楠
- Hanyu Pinyin: Xiāo Zhèngnán
- Jyutping: Siu1 Zing3 Naam4

Birth name - Siu Kam Lun
- Traditional Chinese: 蕭錦麟
- Simplified Chinese: 萧锦麟
- Hanyu Pinyin: Xiāo Jǐnlín
- Hokkien POJ: Siu1 Gam2 Leon4

Edwin Siu Ching Nam (Chinese: 蕭正楠; Jyutping: Siu Ching Nam; born 23 March 1977) is a Hong Kong actor and singer. Siu started his career as an idol singer and was formerly managed by Music Nation Group. In 2002, Siu left the Hong Kong entertainment industry to start his career in mainland China. In 2008, he returned to Hong Kong and signed an artiste contract with TVB.

== Early life and career ==
Siu became popular in high school as a singer. In 2001, he distinguished himself in a singing contest and was signed by Music Nation Group as a singer and found early success. After a fierce competition with new singers including Juno Mak and Shawn Yue, he won the Rookie of the Year award. However, Siu's initial success ended abruptly in 2002 after he made the controversial statement “the good will always prevail” at the party after 2002 JSG award . The following day his comment was taken out of context with news reports claiming that Siu's comments were made towards fellow singer Juno Mak, who was known for his wealthy father's backing of his career, angering Mak's supporters and fans. Siu's career plummeted immediately and was sent by his management company to restart his career in mainland China. He was sent to Beijing and was eventually dropped by his management company in 2004, preventing him from releasing any new albums. Siu has said 2004 was one of his most depressing year as his career spiraled downhill and his father also died.

Finding little success in mainland and missing his family, Siu returned to Hong Kong in 2008 to sign with TVB as an actor. Starting with minor supporting roles he eventually climbed to lead roles at TVB. In 2012, he starred in the TV drama Daddy Good Deeds playing the character "Yip Kwai" with an image that subverted from his early career. The role brought him his first TVB acting nomination as a supporting actor. In response to his role, Siu remarked that “It was too easy for me to succeed in the past, then I became arrogant. I often lost my temper when I felt unhappy with some small thing. But now I knew that rather to have a sudden rise in life, I prefer to work hard step-by-step. I was fortunately to have this opportunity to reintroduce my image to the public.” In addition to his role on Daddy Good Deeds, he also sang the drama‘a theme song, which was well received.

In 2013, Siu starred as the lead actor, co-leading with Ruco Chan in the TVB drama Brother's Keeper. His character "Law Wai-son" brought him further recognition as an actor. After the success of Brother's Keeper, Siu was given more opportunities as a lead actor.

== Personal life ==
Siu is good friends with actors Wayne Lai, Raymond Cho, Raymond Wong and Power Chan. The five together have starred in TVB dramas The Confidant and Overachievers.

In 2014, Siu began dating Madam Cutie On Duty co-star Priscilla Wong. At the 2018 TVB Anniversary Awards, the couple announced that they had got married earlier that year. His wife suffered a miscarriage but later gave birth to a child in March 2025.

== Filmography ==
=== TVB television series ===
Title	Year	Role	Notes
Aqua Heroes	2003	Edwin Tong Kai-lok	
ICAC Investigators 2004	2004	Hung Kwok-keung	Episode 5: "Short Stake"
The Zone	2005	Buyer	Episode 7: "Buyer"
When Easterly Showers Fall on the Sunny West	2008	Kwan Ho-cheung	
D.I.E. Again	2009	Jose Kam Chi-fung	
Beyond the Realm of Conscience	2009	Li Chan, Emperor Wuzong of Tang	
Can't Buy Me Love	2010	Prince Consort Chiu Wan	
Dropping By Cloud Nine	2011	Victor	Episode 7: "Love Transfer"
Grace Under Fire	2011	Kazuo Tokugawa	
Forensic Heroes III	2011	Ken Ho Ching-man	
Daddy Good Deeds	2012	Yip Kwai (Ah Yap)	
Gloves Come Off	2012	Edward Leung Yan-wah	
The Last Steep Ascent	2012	Ho Sai-ho	
The Confidant	2012	Ling Tim-sau	
A Great Way to Care II	2013	Dr. Jackson Leung Kai-wing	
Bullet Brain	2013	PC Choi Fei-lung	
Brother's Keeper	2013	Law Wai-shun	TVB Star Award Malaysia for Favourite Top 15 TVB Drama Character
Overachievers	2014	Yuen Siu-tin	
Madam Cutie On Duty	2015	SGT Law Tai-shu	TVB Star Award Malaysia for Favourite TVB On-Screen Couple (with Priscilla Wong); StarHub TVB Award for My Favourite TVB On-Screen Couple (with Wong); StarHub TVB Award for My Favourite TVB Male TV Characters
My "Spiritual" Ex-Lover	2015	Ning Choi-san	
Master of Destiny	2015	Cho Chi-ko	
Short End of the Stick	2016	Chui Chun-sing/ Ko Chiu / Kam Fai	
Brother's Keeper II	2016	Law Wai-shun	StarHub TVB Award for My Favourite TVB Male TV Character
Two Steps from Heaven	2016	Sean Fung Chik-yin	
No Reserve	2016	Chau Sai-kai	
A General, a Scholar and a Eunuch	2017	Yuan Chonghuan / Wan Tai-kwan '	TVB Anniversary Award for Most Popular On-Screen Partnership (with Raymond Cho and Matthew Ho)
Birth of a Hero	2018	Yuk Wan-lung	
Deep in the Realm of Conscience	2018	Commander Ho Lei	
Our Unwinding Ethos	2019	Fu Tsz-pok	
Of Greed and Ants	2020	Steve Chin Wing-chun	
Beauty And The Boss	2021	Tong Yan	
Final Destiny	2021	Lee Sau-yuen / Mo Ye-kwong	
Narcotics Heroes	2023	Yip Ho-tin, Inspector of Police	
Broken Trust	2024	Chiu Tsz-yong	
No Return	2024	Deng Gwai Ping/Lin Mo Choy/Long Sai Hoi	

=== Shaw Brothers television series ===
Title	Year	Role	Notes
Flying Tiger 3	2021	Choi Siu-pui	

=== Mainland Chinese television series ===
Title	Year	Role	Notes
Cooking Master Boy	2005	Liu Mao-hsing	
Qiu Ai Qiao Jiaren	2006	Hu Zijun	
Out of Your Love	2006	Ji Yang	
Xiang Yu	2007	Cheng Jianuo	
A Weaver on the Horizon	2010	Fang Ning	
The Vigilantes In Masks	2011	Ying Wuqiu / Bao Laiying	

=== Films ===
Title	Year	Role	Notes
The Young Ones	1999	Police	Extra
Truth or Dare: 6th Floor Rear Flat	2003	Edwin	
City of SARS	2003	Ho-yin	
The Park	2003	Yeung Tin-lun	
Dating Death	2004	Chak	
The Beautiful Life	2004	Lai Kar-kiu	
Can Not Cry	2004	Feng Ming	
The Gerile	2004	Fang Fang	
Academy of Detectives: Kill of Love	2004	Edwin	
Explosive City	2004	Police	Cameo
China's Next Top Princess	2005	Emperor	
Meng Xiang Ren Jian	2007	Wei Xing	
Turning Point	2009	Zatoi's lawyer	Cameo

=== Web series ===
Title	Year	Role	Notes
Beach * Volleyball * Souffle	2002	Edwin	
Accept Me	2002	Waiter	Cameo
Feel 100%	2002	Mak Yun-sau	
吻了再說	2003	Leung Bor	
金甲蟲探偵學院	2004	Edwin	

== Discography ==
=== Studio albums ===
#	English title	Original title	Type	Release date	Label
1st	Born to Fly		EP	22 August 2002	Music Nation Group
2nd	Edwin	蕭正楠	Album	2 January 2003	Music Nation Group
2nd	Edwin Siu (Special Edition)	蕭正楠（特別版）	Album	21 January 2003	Music Nation Group
3rd	What Do You Want Me to Do	你想我點	Album	22 September 2003	Music Nation Group
4th	Story	故事	Album	15 July 2004	Music Nation Group

=== Soundtrack appearances ===
Year	English title	Original title	TV series	Notes
2003	"Suspicious Close Friends"	可疑密友 (Ho Yi Mat Yau)	Aqua Heroes	with Bobo Chan
2005	"One Thousand Times More Energy"	一千倍動能 (Yat Cin Pui Dung Nang)	Crush Gear Turbo	
2012	"Never Cared"	從未在意 (Cung Mei Joi Yi)	Daddy Good Deeds	
2013	"Enclosure"	圍牆 (Wai Coeng)	A Great Way to Care II	
2013	"My History"	我的歷史 (Ngo Dik Lik Si)	Bullet Brain	
2013	"Big Wheel"	巨輪 (Geui Lun)	Brother's Keeper	with Ruco Chan
2015	"I'll Always Be Yours"	—N/a	Madam Cutie On Duty	
2015	"Repay"	報恩 (Bou Jan)	My "Spiritual" Ex-Lover	with Nancy Sit, Evergreen Mak
2015	"Unbeatable"	轟天動地 (Gwang Tin Dung Dei)	Master of Destiny	
2015	"400 Sq. Ft."	400呎 (Sei Bak Cek)	Brick Slaves	
2016	"The Warmth of Love"	愛的溫暖 (Oi Dik Wan Nyun)	House of Spirits	

== Awards and nominations ==
=== Music ===
Year	Award	Category	Work	Result	Ref.
2002	Ultimate Song Chart Awards	Ultimate New Male Artist	Edwin	Bronze	
2002	RTHK Top 10 Gold Songs Awards	Most Popular Karaoke Song Award	"Ngok Gwo" (惡果; "Consequences")	Won	
2002	RTHK Top 10 Gold Songs Awards	Most Prospective New Male Artist	Edwin	Gold	
2002	Jade Solid Gold Best Ten Music Awards Presentation	Most Popular New Male Artist	Edwin	Gold	
2003	Ultimate Song Chart Awards	Ultimate Duet	"Dak Bit Ming Ze" (特別鳴謝; "Special Thanks") (with Jade Kwan)	Won	
2003	Children Gold Songs Awards	Top 10 Songs	"Yat Cin Pui Dung Nang" (一千倍動能) (Cantonese theme song for Crush Gear Turbo)	Won	
2003	Children Gold Songs Awards	Children Golden Songs	"Yat Cin Pui Dung Nang" (一千倍動能)	Bronze	

=== Acting ===
Year	Award	Category	Work	Result
2003	TVB Anniversary Awards	Best Actor	Aqua Heroes	Nominated
2003	TVB Anniversary Awards	Most Improved Male Artiste	Aqua Heroes	Nominated
2003	TVB Anniversary Awards	TVB Anniversary Award for My Favourite Onscreen Partnership (with BoBo Chan and Leila Kong)	Aqua Heroes	Nominated
2004	Hong Kong Film Awards	Best New Performer	Truth or Dare: 6th Floor Rear Flat	Nominated
2011	My AOD Favourites Awards	My Favourite Supporting Actor	Forensic Heroes III	Nominated
2011	My AOD Favourites Awards	My Favourite Promising Male Artiste	Forensic Heroes III	Nominated
2012	My AOD Favourites Awards	My Favourite Supporting Actor	Daddy Good Deeds	Nominated
2012	My AOD Favourites Awards	My Favourite "Outstanding" Popularity King	Daddy Good Deeds	Nominated
2012	TVB Anniversary Awards	Best Supporting Actor	Daddy Good Deeds	Nominated
2012	TVB Anniversary Awards	Most Improved Male Artiste	Daddy Good Deeds; Gloves Come Off; The Last Steep Ascent; The Confidant	Top 5
2013	TVB Star Awards Malaysia	Favourite TVB Actor	Brother's Keeper	Nominated
2013	TVB Star Awards Malaysia	Favourite TVB Supporting Actor	A Great Way to Care II	Nominated
2013	TVB Star Awards Malaysia	Top 15 Favourite TVB Drama Characters	Brother's Keeper - Lo Wai-shun	Won
2013	TVB Anniversary Awards	Best Actor	Brother's Keeper	Nominated
2013	TVB Anniversary Awards	Most Popular Male Character	Brother's Keeper - Lo Wai-shun	Nominated
2013	TVB Anniversary Awards	Most Improved Male Artiste	A Great Way to Care II; Bullet Brain; Brother's Keeper	Top 5
2014	StarHub TVB Awards	My Favourite TVB Actor	Brother's Keeper	Nominated
2014	StarHub TVB Awards	My Favourite TVB Male TV Character	Brother's Keeper	Won
2014	StarHub TVB Awards	My Favourite TVB Onscreen Couple	Brother's Keeper (with Kristal Tin)	Nominated
2014	TVB Star Awards Malaysia	Favourite TVB Supporting Actor	Overachievers	Nominated
2014	TVB Star Awards Malaysia	Top 15 Favourite TVB Drama Characters	Overachievers - Yuen Siu-tin	Nominated
2014	TVB Anniversary Awards	Best Supporting Actor	Overachievers	Nominated
2015	TVB Star Awards Malaysia	Favourite TVB Actor	Madam Cutie On Duty	Nominated
2015	TVB Star Awards Malaysia	Top 16 Favourite TVB Drama Characters	Madam Cutie On Duty - Law Tai-shu	Nominated
2015	TVB Star Awards Malaysia	Favourite TVB Onscreen Couple (with Priscilla Wong)	Madam Cutie On Duty	Won
2015	TVB Anniversary Awards	Best Actor	Madam Cutie On Duty	Nominated
2015	TVB Anniversary Awards	Most Popular Male Character	Madam Cutie On Duty - Law Tai-shu	Nominated
2015	StarHub TVB Awards	My Favourite TVB Actor	Madam Cutie On Duty	Nominated
2015	StarHub TVB Awards	My Favourite TVB Drama Characters	Madam Cutie On Duty - Law Tai-shu	Won
2015	StarHub TVB Awards	My Favourite TVB Onscreen Couple (with Priscilla Wong)	Madam Cutie On Duty	Won
2016	TVB Star Awards Malaysia	Favourite TVB Actor	Brother's Keeper II	Nominated
2016	TVB Star Awards Malaysia	Top 15 Favourite TVB Drama Characters	Brother's Keeper II - Lo Wai-shun	Nominated
2016	TVB Star Awards Malaysia	Favourite TVB Onscreen Couple (with Grace Chan)	Brother's Keeper II	Nominated
2016	TVB Star Awards Malaysia	Favourite TVB Onscreen Couple (with Bosco Wong and Priscilla Wong)	Two Steps from Heaven	Nominated
2016	TVB Anniversary Awards	Best Actor	Brother's Keeper II	Nominated
2016	TVB Anniversary Awards	Most Popular OnScreen Partnership (with Wayne Lai, Raymond Cho and Power Chan)	Short End of the Stick	Top 3
2016	TVB Anniversary Awards	Most Popular Onscreen Partnership (with Bosco Wong and Louis Cheung)	Two Steps from Heaven	Nominated
2016	StarHub TVB Awards	My Favourite TVB Actor	Brother's Keeper II	Nominated
2016	StarHub TVB Awards	My Favourite TVB Drama Characters	Brother's Keeper II - Lo Wai-shun	Won
2016	StarHub TVB Awards	My Favourite TVB Onscreen Couple (with Grace Chan)	Brother's Keeper II	Nominated
2017	TVB Star Awards Malaysia	Favourite TVB Actor	A General, a Scholar and a Eunuch	Nominated
2017	TVB Star Awards Malaysia	Top 17 Favourite TVB Drama Characters	A General, a Scholar and a Eunuch - Lo Wai-shun	Nominated
2017	TVB Star Awards Malaysia	Favourite TVB Onscreen Couple (with Kristal Tin)	A General, a Scholar and a Eunuch	Nominated
2017	TVB Anniversary Awards	Best Actor	A General, a Scholar and a Eunuch	Nominated
2017	TVB Anniversary Awards	Most Popular Male Character	A General, a Scholar and a Eunuch - Yuan Chonghuan / Wan Tai-kwan	Top 5
2017	TVB Anniversary Awards	Most Popular Onscreen Partnership (with Raymond Cho and Matthew Ho)	A General, a Scholar and a Eunuch	Won
2017	StarHub TVB Awards	My Favourite TVB Actor	A General, a Scholar and a Eunuch	Nominated
2017	StarHub TVB Awards	My Favourite TVB Drama Characters	A General, a Scholar and a Eunuch - Yuan Chonghuan / Wan Tai-kwan	Won
2017	StarHub TVB Awards	My Favourite TVB Onscreen Couple (with Priscilla Wong)	Two Steps from Heaven	Nominated
2017	People's Choice Television Awards	People's Choice Best Actor	A General, a Scholar and a Eunuch	Ranked 5th
2018	TVB Anniversary Awards	Best Actor	Deep in the Realm of Conscience	Nominated
2018	TVB Anniversary Awards	Most Popular Male Character	Deep in the Realm of Conscience - Ho Lei	Nominated
2019	TVB Anniversary Awards	Best Actor	Our Unwinding Ethos	Nominated
2020	TVB Anniversary Awards	Best Actor	Of Greed and Ants	Nominated
2020	TVB Anniversary Awards	Most Popular Male Character	Of Greed and Ants - Chin Wing-chun	Nominated
2021	TVB Anniversary Awards	Best Actor	Beauty And The Boss	Top 10
2021	TVB Anniversary Awards	Most Popular Male Character	Beauty And The Boss - Tong Yan	Nominated
2021	TVB Anniversary Awards	Most Popular Onscreen Partnership (with Jeannie Chan)	Beauty And The Boss	Nominated
2021	TVB Anniversary Awards	Favourite TVB Actor in Malaysia	Beauty And The Boss	Nominated
2021	TVB Anniversary Awards	Best Actor	Final Destiny	Nominated
2021	TVB Anniversary Awards	Most Popular Male Character	Final Destiny - Lee Sau-yuen	Nominated
2021	TVB Anniversary Awards	Favourite TVB Actor in Malaysia	Final Destiny	Nominated
2021	People's Choice Television Awards	People's Choice Best Actor	Final Destiny - Lee Sau-yuen	Nominated
2023	TVB Anniversary Awards	Best Actor	The Narcotics Heroes	Top 5
2023	TVB Anniversary Awards	Favourite TVB Actor in Greater Bay Area	The Narcotics Heroes	Nominated
