= The Last Steep Ascent =

Hong Kong television drama

- Official poster
- Also known as: Ladder of Love; Ladder to Heaven
- 天梯
- Genre: Period drama Romance
- Written by: Chan Ching-yee; Shek Hoi-ting
- Starring: Moses Chan; Maggie Cheung Ho-yee; Kenny Wong; Aimee Chan; Helena Law; Edwin Siu; KK Cheung; Elliot Ngok
- Theme music composer: Yip Siu-chung
- Opening theme: "Yat Sang Yat Sam" (一生一心) by Hubert Wu
- Country of origin: Hong Kong
- Original language: Cantonese
- No. of episodes: 25

Production
- Executive producer: Lee Tim-shing
- Production location: Hong Kong
- Camera setup: Multi camera
- Running time: 45 minutes (each)
- Production company: TVB

Original release
- Network: Jade; HD Jade
- Release: September 17 – October 19, 2012

The Last Steep Ascent
- Chinese: 天梯
- Literal meaning: "Sky Ladder"
Transcriptions
Yue: Cantonese
- Jyutping: Tin1 Tai1

The Last Steep Ascent is a Hong Kong television drama produced by TVB under executive producer Lee Tim-sing.

== Background ==
The drama is a fictionalized account of a true love story between an older woman and a younger man in 1930s China. Koo Sun-yuet, the wife of a wealthy businessman, falls in love with Miu Tin, a man eight years her junior. The two elope to the countryside and lives modestly for the remainder of their lives. Before Tin dies, he handcarves a long stair path on the mountain so Yuet can travel down with ease.

== Production ==
A costume fitting press conference was held at TVB City's Studio 1 in Tseung Kwan O on 20 September 2011. The blessing ceremony was held at the studios on 13 October 2011.

== Cast ==
- Maggie Cheung Ho-yee as Koo Sun-yuet (顧新月), the main protagonist. She is the wife of Ho Sai-cheung, a talented businessman in the Chinese medicine wholesaling business. Yuet falls in love with Miu Tin, a man eight years her junior, and the two elope to the countryside for a modest living. It is revealed that she met Miu Tin when he was younger during her journey to her wedding.
- Moses Chan as Miu Tin (苗天), Yuet's lover who is eight years her junior. He is a peasant hailing from Ngau Yee Village, and plants Chinese herbs and medicine for a living. It is revealed that he met Yuet during his childhood, during which he asked her to touch his gums where he was missing two front teeth, believing that front teeth would grow quickly when a bride touches it.
- Kenny Wong as Cheng Kiu (鄭嬌), Tin's best friend. His wife died with nobody to help her and Kiu, drinking with his friends, his child also died later regardless of his attempt to save his child. He is shown marrying Oi-tai in the last episode.
- Aimee Chan as Tin Oi-tai (田愛娣), a maid from San Francisco, who has an affair with Sai-cheung. She is raped by a man who later comes back to haunt her, whilst she believes that the child she is impregnated with was Sai-cheung's. She eventually has a miscarriage, leading her to fall in love with Kiu who saved her from the rapist who assaulted her. She shares the latter part of her name, Oi-tai, with Kiu's previous wife, questioning if Kiu truly loved her. She is shown to marry Kiu in the last episode.
- Edwin Siu as Ho Sai-ho (賀世豪), the main antagonist. He is the son of Kwan-yiu and cousin of Sai-cheung. He attempts to burn down the storage of the business which he took over, in order to escape with his wife and start over, whilst taking the majority of the money. This, however, is foiled by the police.
- KK Cheung as Ho Sai-cheung (賀世章), the husband of Sun-yuet, and the current executive officer of the Ho family's Chinese medicine business, Ho Ching Tong. He is the most powerful and successful figure in the Chinese medicine wholesaling business. He died in episode seven, from his sickness which had dormant since his time in San Francisco, of which he hid from his family.
- Law Lan as Leung Mei-kuen (梁美娟), known as Old Mrs. Ho, Ho Sai-cheung's mother, the matriarch of the Ho family.
- Cheung Yick as Ho Kwan-yiu (賀坤堯), Sai-ho's father and Sai-cheung's elder paternal uncle.
- Joel Chan as Lai Chai-man (黎濟民), a young, ambitious businessman who strives to achieve the top spot in the Chinese medicine wholesaling business.
- Samantha Ko as Cheng Yim-ping (鄭艷萍), Chai-man's wife.
- Benjamin Yuen as Ho Sai-leung (賀世亮), Sai-cheung's younger brother.
- Katy Kung as Ho Sai-man (賀世雯), Sai-cheung and Sai-leung's younger sister.
- Mat Yeung as Ngai Po-law (魏保羅), Sai-man's husband.
- Tsui Wing as Kwan Kwong-tat (關廣達), known as Blackie Tat, one of Tin's friend.
- Yvonne Ho as Kong Pik-kei (江碧琪), Sai-ho's wife.
- Yeung Ching-wah as Liu Sam-kan (廖三斤), one of Tin's friend.
- Raymond Chiu as Suen Man-wah (孫文華), an office clerk personally hired by Sai-cheung.
- Eddie Li as Ho Yan Lung (賀仁龍), the founder of the Chinese medicine business, Ho Ching Tong, and Ho Kwan Yiu's father.
- Yu Tze Ming as Chung Kam (鍾鑑), Ngau Yee Village's village chief.
- Kaki Leung as Chung Lok-ho (鍾樂荷), the daughter of Kam.
- Jim Tang as Lau Kar-ming (劉家明), a schoolteacher and the boyfriend of Lok-ho.
- Chuk Man-kwan as Aunt Hung (紅嫂), Mrs. Ho's maid.
- Yueh Hua as Miu Hoi (苗海), Tin's father, died shortly after his wife died.
- Suet Nei as Tsui Siu-mui (徐小妹), Tin's mother, shown to die naturally in the beginning.

=== Ho Family tree ===
Ho Kwan	Unknown
Fourth Uncle	Ho Yan-lung	Unknown
Ho Kwan-yiu	Unknown	Ho Chung-yiu	Leung Mei-kuen
Kong Bik-kei	Ho Sai-ho	Ho Sai-cheung	Koo Sun-yuet	Ho Sai-leung	Ho Sai-man	Ngai Po-law
Ho Sze-hang	Ho Sze-yu	Ho Sze-chi

== Awards and nominations ==
2012 TVB Anniversary Awards:

- Nominated: Best Drama
- Nominated: Best Actor (Moses Chan) - Top 5
- Nominated: Best Actress (Aimee Chan)
- Nominated: Best Supporting Actor (Kenny Wong)
- Nominated: Best Supporting Actress (Helena Law)
- Nominated: My Favourite Male Character (Moses Chan)
- Nominated: Most Improved Male Artiste (Edwin Siu)
- Nominated: Most Improved Female Artiste (Katy Kung)

== Viewership ratings ==
The following is a table that includes a list of the total ratings points based on television viewership.

Week	Originally Aired	Episodes	Average Points	Peaking Points	References
1	17–20 September 2012	1 — 4	28	—	
2	24–28 September 2012	5 — 9	28	—	
3	1–5 October 2012	10 — 14	29	—	
4	8–12 October 2012	15 — 19	31	35	
5	15–18 October 2012	20 — 23	32	—	
5	19 October 2012	24 — 25	35	39	
