= Short end of the stick =

Short end of the stick may refer to:

- Tally stick
- Short End of the Stick (TV series), a 2016 Hong Kong TVB drama
