= The Threshold of a Persona =

Hong Kong television series

- Official poster
- ID精英
- Genre: Drama
- Written by: Choi Ting-ting
- Starring: Roger Kwok; Patrick Tang; John Chiang; Yoyo Mung; Raymond Cho; Toby Leung; Power Chan
- Theme music composer: Patrick Tang
- Opening theme: "Yim Sik" (掩飾) by Patrick Tang & Roger Kwok
- Country of origin: Hong Kong
- Original language: Cantonese
- No. of episodes: 26 (Hong Kong only); 30

Production
- Producer: Marco Law
- Production location: Hong Kong
- Camera setup: Multi camera
- Running time: 45 minutes (per episode)
- Production company: TVB

Original release
- Network: TVB Jade
- Release: 1 June – 5 July 2009

The Threshold of a Persona
- Chinese: ID精英
- Literal meaning: ID Elites
Transcriptions
Standard Mandarin
- Hanyu Pinyin: ID Jīngyīng
Yue: Cantonese
- Jyutping: ID Zing1 Jing1

The Threshold of a Persona is a 2009 TVB television drama from Hong Kong produced by Marco Law. It was broadcast between June and July 2009. The drama features the work of the Immigration Department of Hong Kong.

== Cast ==
Cast	Role	Description
Roger Kwok	Fong Chun-Kit 方浚杰	Immigration officer Cheung Si-Man's husband Father of Hei-Hei
Claire Yiu	Cheung Sze-Man 張思敏	Mainland immigrant Fong Tsun-Kit's wife Mother of Hei-Hei; Dies in episode 29
Yoyo Mung	Yip On-Kei (Angel) 葉安琪	Immigration officer Pak-Yu's ex-girlfriend Yip On-Yee's sister
Natalie Tong	Yip On-Yee 葉安兒	Yip On-Kei's sister Au Shun-Fung's old crush Friend of Au shung fung and Chung Chi-Yan; Mother of Ci-Ci
Patrick Tang	Au Shun-Fung 歐順風	Immigration officer Chi-Yan's crush, later boyfriend
Toby Leung	Chung Chi-Yan 鍾志欣	On-Yee's friend Au Shun Fung's girlfriend
Raymond Cho	Cheng Pak-Yu 鄭柏宇	Police officer On Kei's ex-boyfriend
David Chiang	Mak Kai-Ming 麥啟銘	Immigration officer
Ben Wong	Chung Chi-Wing 鍾志榮	Police officer Chun-Kit's older brother
Kenny Wong (黄德斌)	Wu Kit-Sam 胡杰琛	Gangster later in prison Cheung Si-Man's lover
Mary Hon	Chang Mei Ping 陳美萍	Fong Chun Kit's mother
Shermon Tang		Immigration officer
Ruco Chan	Mak Chi Hin (Kelvin) 麥子軒	Mak Kai-Ming's son
Power Chan	Leung Chi-Lun 梁智倫	Immigration officer Friend of Tsun-Ki and On-Kei
Queenie Chu	Ching Pui Ka (Connie) 程佩嘉	Immigration officer
Ellesmere Choi	Hon Wing Nin (Roy) 韓永年	Immigration officer
Iris Wong	Chiu La Man 趙麗文	Chung Chi Wing's wife
Coleman Tam	Fong Ka Hei (Hei Hei)	Fong Chun Kit and Cheung Si Man's son

== Viewership ratings ==
	Week	Episodes	Average points	Peaking points	References
1	June 1–4, 2009	1 — 4	28	31	
2	June 8–12, 2009	5 — 9	28	30	
3	June 15–19, 2009	10 — 14	29	33	
4	June 22–26, 2009	15 — 19	31	—	
5	June 29 - July 3, 2009	20 — 24	32	—	
5	July 4, 2009	25 — 26	29	—	
5	July 5, 2009	27	38	41	
