= Short End of the Stick (TV series) =

2016 Hong Kong television drama

- Official poster
- Also known as: Eunuchs Leave the Palace
- 公公出宮
- Genre: Period drama, Comedy
- Created by: Hong Kong Television Broadcasts Limited
- Written by: Kwan Chung-ling, Dai Tak-gwong, Au Ka-wai, Hui Ka-yue, Leung Man-tse
- Directed by: Lai Bak-kin, Wong Yue-lok, Liu Sui-lun, Kwok Ka-hei, Ng koon-yu
- Starring: Wayne Lai; Nancy Wu; Edwin Siu; Power Chan; Raymond Cho; David Chiang; Natalie Tong; Rosina Lam; Grace Wong
- Theme music composer: Alan Cheung
- Opening theme: Blue Sky (藍天白雲) by Sammy Sum
- Country of origin: Hong Kong
- Original languages: Cantonese; Mandarin; French
- No. of episodes: 35

Production
- Executive producer: Catherine Tsang
- Producer: Marco Law
- Production locations: Hong Kong; Kaiping, China - Zili village
- Editor: Kwan Chung-ling
- Camera setup: Multi camera
- Running time: 45 minutes
- Production company: TVB

Original release
- Network: Jade; HD Jade
- Release: 9 February – 27 March 2016

Related
- Love as a Predatory Affair; The Last Healer In Forbidden City; The Confidant

Short End of the Stick
- Traditional Chinese: 公公出宮
- Simplified Chinese: 公公出宫
- Cantonese Yale: Gūnggūng Chēutgūng
- Literal meaning: "Eunuchs Leave the Palace"
Transcriptions
Standard Mandarin
- Hanyu Pinyin: Gōnggōng Chūgōng
- Bopomofo: ㄍㄨㄥ ㄍㄨㄥ˙ ㄔㄨ ㄍㄨㄥ
Yue: Cantonese
- Yale Romanization: Gūnggūng Chēutgūng
- Jyutping: Gung1gung1 Ceot1gung1
- IPA: [kóŋ.kóŋ tsʰɵ́t̚.kóŋ]

Short End of the Stick (Chinese: 公公出宮; Cantonese Yale: Gūnggūng Chēutgūng; literally "Eunuchs Leave the Palace") is a 2016 Hong Kong period comedy television drama produced by TVB. The drama is TVB's 2016 Lunar New Year drama, starring Wayne Lai, Nancy Wu and Edwin Siu as the main leads. It premiered on February 9, 2016, airing every Monday to Friday on Hong Kong's Jade and HD Jade channels during its 8:30-9:30 pm timeslot, concluding March 27, 2016 with a total of 35 episodes.

Short End of the Stick is an indirect sequel to TVB's 2012 drama The Confidant. Short End of the Stick also stars most of the same cast from The Confidant. Both dramas centers around the lives, struggles and betrayals of eunuchs, but unlike The Confidant which was a melodrama, Short End of the Stick is a light hearted comedy. The Confidant main protagonist Li Lianying, played by Wayne Lai is mentioned as part of the plot in Short End of the Stick.

The drama is a comedic depiction of the lives of eunuchs after the fall of the Qing dynasty and their eviction from the Forbidden City by the last Emperor of China, Puyi.

== Synopsis ==
Eunuchs Lee Suk-gung (Wayne Lai), Dan Tin (Power Chan) and Chan Siu-fung (Raymond Cho) lived a peaceful life serving the Emperor and the royal family in the Forbidden City. Suk-gung worked in the kitchen as a cook and master carver, Tin worked in the Physician quarters and Siu-fung was a beautician who made the ladies in waiting presentable. After the fall of the Qing dynasty and eviction of all eunuchs and servants in the Forbidden City by the last Emperor of China Puyi, for constant theft of valuables, the three Eunuchs band together to survive outside the Forbidden City as civilians in Beijing. Life as civilians is harsh for the three as they face constant prejudice from revolutionists for being associated with China's imperial past while making a meager living working as kitchen help at an alleyway food stall and rent a small room living together in a dingy neighborhood.

At a rally held by Yip Ching-yee (Ram Chiang), a cruel revolutionist bent on eradicating anyone associated with the Qing dynasty, the three witness a former high-ranking eunuch they were acquainted with during their time in the Forbidden City, being humiliated and abused by Ching-yee and his group of revolutionists. They are told by Ching-yee to join in on humiliating the captured eunuchs. Not wanting to because they are afraid, they meet and befriends Chiu Jun-sing (Edwin Siu) who tells them he is also "one of their own" and that better them doing the abusing of the eunuchs being persecuted than by Ching-yee's group. Chiu Jun-sing is actually a pretend eunuch living off his relative, the former high-ranking eunuch being humiliated by Ching-yee because the high-ranking eunuch has many priceless valuables taken from the Forbidden City in his possession. Jun-sing helps the eunuch illegally sell these valuables, which is a national crime.

Their troubles begin when Siu-fung is seduced by a prostitute who tricks him into selling himself as a slave to the Americas. Suk-gung and Tin save Siu-fung in time before he signs his life over but before doing so Siu-fung had divulge to the prostitute that he is a eunuch. While walking by they see Jun-sing being prosecuted by Ching-yee for being a eunuch but Jun-sing does not want to blow his cover as a pretender since he has priceless valuable in his possession. Suk-gung, Tin and Siu-fung pretends to be vengeful cheated husbands out for revenge against Jun-sing to save him from Ching-yee but they're outed as eunuchs by the prostitute who earlier tried to trick Siu-fung.

Now wanted criminals by authorities for having a national artifact in their possession and Ching-yee for being eunuchs, the four escape to Shenzhen. During their escape, Siu-fung was hit by a bullet. Once they arrive in Tianjin they take Siu-fung to a hospital where the staff refused to treat Siu-fung unless they have money. In order to save Siu-Fung, the three decide to mug someone. After looking at possible victims they decide on a cruel looking woman beater who happens to be a female dressed like a man. During the struggle to rob her, she suffers an asthma attack. Worried that she could die from her asthma attack, they take her to the same hospital that they took Siu-fung. They soon find out that she is Kam Dai-nam (Rosina Lam) from the powerful and rich Kam family. Hearing that her niece was bullied, Dai-nam's aunt Kam Heung (Nancy Wu) comes to the hospital with her servants to seek revenge.

Kam Heung lets them go and pays for Siu-fung's medical expenses when she realizes that the trio only robbed for money to save their friend's life. However Siu-fung's medical expenses was not a charity and the three are sent to work as servants for the Kam family until their debt is paid off. Suk-gung and Tin are satisfied with this arrangement since life as a Kam servant is similar to the life they had in the Forbidden City.

Kam Heung is head of the Kam family and manages the family rice merchant business because she is the only child alive born to the main wife of her father. Her older brother and Dai-nam's father Kam Cheong (David Chiang), has no status in the family since he was born to a concubine and his offspring are all daughters. Besides managing the family business, Kam Heung has to deal with a bickering household where her late older brother's wife gets her way and belittles everyone in the family because she gave birth to the Kams current heir, and she also has to deal with a trouble making business rival who steals from them and constantly makes fun of the Kams for having insufficient male heirs.

Suk-gung and Tin's professionalism, intelligence, obedience, patient and complementing words soon prove to be the perfect servants to the Kams. Dai-nam also take a liking to Siu-fung and showers him with luxury when he brings her good luck in gambling. But the trios secret as eunuchs could affect their standings with the Kams when they find out the Kams have an hatred for eunuchs because the family was cursed by legendary powerful imperial eunuch Lei Lin-ying, because the Kams ancestors had offended Lei. Afraid they will be facing prejudice, Suk-gung and Tin decides to revert to their dirty eunuch tactics, along with the help of Jun-sing they steal valuables from the Kams to fund for their passage escape.

When strange things starts happening on the Kam family grounds, everyone in the village start to believe the Kam curse. The eunuchs who have seen this kind of situation in the Forbidden City between the Emperor's consorts know that someone is up to no good and secretly warns Kam Heung, In order to prove the curse is just a saying, Kam Heung encourages all the single females over thirty to get married. Her plan however backfires when the Kams enemy Tsui Tai-Fu, pushes her to get married herself. Suk-gung, Tin and Jun-sing sees this as an opportunity to ripoff more of the Kam fortune by hiring a stranger to enter into a fake marriage with Kam Heung. Meanwhile, Suk-gung, Tin and Jun-sing's roommates find their stolen stash and reports it to Kam Heung, however ironically Suk-gung and Tin had donated all the money they pawned from stolen goods to the local western doctor who needed it for his son's medical expenses. This makes the eunuchs reputation in the Kam family even better since they think the eunuchs stole to help save a life and Suk-gung soon becomes Kam Heung's personal advisor.

On the day of Kam Heung's husband competition everything goes wrong. Tsui Tai-Fu sends his nephew to beat the man Jun-sing hired to win the competition, and the man hired is found out as a wanted criminal. Embarrassed by the whole situation, Kam Heung runs away with Suk-gung following her. When the two are found by the rest of the Kam family, the two are in a compromised position due to accidentally consuming a performance enhancer and mistaken by onlookers to have acted in an indecent manner. Not wanting to expose himself as a eunuch, Suk-gung agrees to Kam Heung's idea of going into a fake marriage with her in order to avoid the village punishment of being drowned alive.

== Cast ==
=== Eunuchs ===
- Wayne Lai as Lee Suk-gung (李肅恭; homophone to 你叔公, your uncle)

A eunuch who worked in the palace kitchen as a cook and master carver. The leader and most masculine of the three eunuchs. His flattering words gets Kam Heung to admire him, and he becomes her personal advisor. He and Kam Heung are forced into marriage when the entire village thinks they had an indecent affair. He soon becomes spoiled like the rest of the Kam family when he starts living their affluent life.

- Edwin Siu as Chui Jun-sing (崔晉昇; homophone to 催晉升, force promoted) aka Kam Fai (金輝)

As a pretend eunuch, Suk-gung, Siu-fung and Tin meet as civilians outside of the palace. He was living off of his maternal uncle Eunuch Chiu by illegally selling priceless artifacts he has in his possession. He is also a womanizer that has affairs with married women and a penchant for prostitutes. He falls in-love with Wong Lin at first sight. He is also Kam Fai, the illegitimate son of Cheung's and Heung's father. Yin-wai devises a plan to frame him for selling tinted soy sauce because she is worried that he will become the new Kam family head. When someone dies because of Yin-wai's lies he is put on death row, but is saved during his execution due to befriending a crime boss in jail. He comes back to the Kams village as a high ranking warlord general under the name Ko Chiu (高超), to seek revenge against the Kams.

- Raymond Cho as Chan Siu-fung (陳小鳳; nicknamed Sai Gai 細雞, little chicken in Chinese)

A eunuch who was a beautician to the ladies in waiting in the palace. He is a romantic who is always searching for someone to love him. He is also the most feminine, gullible and honest of the three eunuchs. Kam Dai-nam takes a liking to him because he brings her good luck. Uneducated, unskilled, unambitious and weak, Kam Heung refuses to hire him. When all the females in the village over 30 are encouraged to get married he helps them look presentable, especially Dai-nam who he helps dress like a female.

- Power Chan as Dan Tin (丹田; same as pubic region)

A eunuch who worked in the physician quarters in the palace. He is the wisest and most educated of the three eunuchs. He finds ways for the three to possibly better their lives. Lee Suk-gung often plots with him. Suk-gung helps him set up a Chinese physicians practice when Suk-gung is fraudulently engaged to Kam Heung. Dan Tin is not happy being a physician as he is not confident with himself and is afraid someone will die in his care.

=== Kam family ===
- Suet Nei as Kam Suk (金淑; homophone to 金屬, metal)

The matriarch of the Kam family. Kam Heung and Kam Cheong's aunt. Wanting Kam Heung to get married, she makes the entire village believe the Kam family curse to be true.

- Nancy Wu as Kam Heung (金香)

Kam Suk's niece. She manages the family rice business because she is the only surviving offspring of her father's main wife. Wanting to prove the Kam family curse is false, she encourages the single females in the village to get married only to be pushed into marriage herself by the Kam family nemesis Tsui Tai-Fu. She later suffers from a brain tumor which forces her to hand over the family business to Kam Cheong.

- David Chiang as Kam Cheong (金昌)

Kam Heung's older half-brother. Ng Yin-wai's husband. Kam Dai-nam, Dai-tse and Dai-da's father. He has no status in the family since he was born to a concubine and is often belittled by his half-sister-in-law Wan Tai-tse and enemy Tsui Tai-Fu for having no male off-springs. He loses the opportunity to become head of the Kam family when it is found out that he was behind Kam Heung and Suk-gung accidentally consuming a sex drug. He marries a pregnant Wong Lin in order to raise Jun-sing's child as a Kam.

- Rachel Kan as Ng Yin-wai (吳賢慧)

Kam Cheong's second wife and Kam Dai-nam, Dai-tse and Dai-da's step-mother. She treats all of her step-daughters as if they were her own. Tsui Tai-Fu's cousin who is in-love with her. She is often belittled by the first son's wife Wan Tai-tse for not being able to have children after being married to Kam Cheong for so many years. To make sure her husband is secure as the new head of the household she underhandedly schemes with Law Hai, Ng Yin-cho and Dr. But Dou to ruin Jun-sing. She advises her husband to marry Wong Lin in order to repel her sin of framing Jun-sing.

- Rosina Lam as Kam Dai-nam (金帶男)

Kam Cheong's eldest daughter. She dresses and acts like a brutish male because her father is made fun of for not having any sons. Her rash behavior and gambling addiction often causes trouble for her aunt Kam Heung. She takes a liking to Chan Siu-fung because he brings her good luck. She married Chan Siu Fung.

- Toby Chan as Kam Dai-tse (金帶子)

Kam Cheong's second daughter. Fung Chun-sai's wife. She is desperate to become pregnant because she is afraid of being belittled for not being able to have a child. She pretends to have amnesia so her husband Chun-sai can regain his confidence.

- Jack Wu as Fung Chun-sai (方振西)

Kam Dai-tse's husband. He is a highly educated scholar who is also Kam Da-bo's tutor. He is afraid of his wife as she often physically and verbally abuses him. Ashamed of being (mentally) impotent, he lets the entire village think that he died from drowning in the river. He is also a spy for the Qing dynasty.

- Grace Wong as Kam Dai-da (金帶弟)

Kam Cheong's youngest daughter. The first university graduate in the Kam family. She studied abroad and is very westernized, dressing in western clothes and speaking English often. But in reality, she never went abroad to study and was working as a magician at a nightclub in Shanghai. She desperately wants to go to France because her lover Bak Long is there. After Bak Long seduces her, he dumps her, and she later finds out that she is pregnant and aborts the child. She starts to admire and have romantic feelings for Dan Tin when he tends to her while she is recovering from her abortion.

- Yoyo Chen as Wan Tai-tse (雲大芝)

The wife of the Kam family's late oldest son by the main wife. Kam Da-bo's mother. She is arrogant and mean-spirited because of her position as the mother of the current and only Kam family male heir. She takes control of the Kam rice business when Kam Heung marries Lee Suk-gung. However, she abuses her power by spending money carelessly on herself. To continue living lavishly as a Kam, she brought Kam Da-bo from a child abductor and lies that he is her biological son.

- Yiub Cheng as Kam Da-bo (金多寶; a name for a jackpot in the Hong Kong lottery "Mark Six")

Wan Tai-tse's son. He is spoiled because he is the current and only Kam family male heir. When he tells the truth about Suk-gung, Tin and Jun-sing stealing from the Kams, no one believes him because of his reputation as a spoiled brat. He is actually not related to the Kams as Wan Tai-tse bought him from a child abductor to cover for her miscarriage.

- Harriet Yeung as Kam Tai-lik (金大力; homophone to 咁大力, So powerful)

Kam Heung's cousin and Law Hai's wife. She manages the Kam family servants.

- Willie Wai as Law Hai (羅蟹; homophone to 籮蟹, a basket of crabs from a Cantonese slang 倒瀉籮蟹, Epsom a basket of crabs which means too hurry and making things chaos)

Kam Tai-lik's husband. He is the Kam family account. His wife always ends up doing his job because he doesn't know how to do math. Together with Ng Yin-wai and Ng Yin-cho, they frame Chiu Jun-sing for selling tainted soy sauce because the three are jealous of Jun-sing's success.

- Dickson Lee as Ng Yin-cho (吳賢祖; homophone to Daniel Wu's Chinese name 吳彥祖)

Ng Yin-wai's cousin who works for the Kam family. Together with Ng Yin-wai and Law Hai, they frame Chiu Jun-sing for selling tainted soy sauce because the three are jealous of Jun-sing's success.

- Ram Chiang as Yip Ching-yee (葉正義)

A revolutionist who is bent on eradicating anyone associated with the Qing dynasty. He likes to humiliate and belittle eunuchs in public. He is also a distant relative of the Kams. When he arrives to the Kam home village to attend Kam Heung's wedding the eunuchs, fearing that he will recognize them, plans to murder him but end up blinding him instead. But he forgives the eunuchs when his sight recovers after seeing how caring they were to him.

=== Kam family servants ===
- Natalie Tong as Wong Lin (黃蓮)

A supposed impoverished peasant girl working at the local brothel and hawking matches on the streets that Kam Cheong and Kam Dai-nam take pity on. She is from a family that was originally wealthy, but became poor. To free her from her brothel contract Kam Cheong steals his wife's savings to buy Wong Lin's freedom. She then becomes a Kam servant working under Kam Dai-da. She is actually hired by Tsui Tai-Fu to seduce Kam Cheong in order to break up his marriage. Chiu Jun-sing falls in-love with her at first sight. She is actually a Qing princess who was saved and raised by an eunuch.

- Sin Ho-ying as Mo Fat-tat (毛發達; homophone to never get rich, 冇發達 in Chinese)

The Kam family body guard who is good at martial arts.

- Chan Min-leung as Uncle Nau (牛叔; meaning "Uncle Cow" in Chinese)

A village elder who lives and works at the Kams property. Mrs. Nau's husband and Miss Nau's father.

- Shally Tsang as Mrs. Nau (牛嬸; meaning "Mrs. Cow" in Chinese)

Uncle Nau's wife and Miss Nau's mother. She works at the Kams property.

- Mina Kwok as Miss Nau (牛女; meaning "Cow girl" in Chinese)

Uncle Nau and Mrs. Nau's daughter. She work at the Kams rice field. Chiu Jun-sing and she were in a courting relationship until he met Wong Lin.

- Anthony Ho as Ding (丁)
- Aurora Li as Kam Ho-yan (金可人)

Kam family maidservant, and Kam Heung's personal bodyguard.

- Kate Tsang as Kam Ho-ngoi (金可愛; homophone to 咁可愛, so cute)

Kam family maidservant, and Kam Heung's personal bodyguard.

- Leslie Ka Chun as Tim (添)
- Moses Cheng as Fat (發)
- Matthew Chu as Choi (財)
- Bob Cheung as Cheung (祥)
- Ng Kwong-lee as Gwai (貴)
- Jackie Cheung as Hing (興)
- Alvis Lo as Wong (旺)
- Kitty Lau as Auntie On (安嬸)

The Kam household cook.

- Lydia Law as Yau (柔)

=== Tsui family and servants ===
- Li Shing-cheong as Tsui Tai-Fu (徐大富; homophone to take-off big pants, 除大褲 in Chinese)

The Kam family business rival. He often causes trouble for the Kam's by stealing from them and belittling them for not having many male off-springs. Ng Yin-wai's cousin has a soft-spot for her because he is in-love with her. He later becomes poor and loses his fortune.

- Janice Shum as Tsui Tai-Fu's wife (徐大富之妻)
- Fanny Lee as Tsui Tai-Fu's wife (徐大富之妻)
- Fanny Ip as Tsui Tai-Fu's wife (徐大富之妻)
- Oscar Li as Lung (龍)
- Alan Tam Kwan Lun as Fu (虎)
- Raymond Lo as Bao (虎)
- Alex Yung as Yau Tiu-man (尤條文)

Tsui Tai-Fu's nephew who was sent to ruin Kam Heung's husband competition.

=== Queue Society ===
*An underground society that wants to restore the Qing dynasty.

- Parkman Wong as Dung Gut (鄧吉)

Leader of the Queue Society.

- Derek Wong as Fu Suet (傅雪)

A spy of the Qing dynasty who is on a secret mission to pass information to Fung Chun-sai.

- Wang Wai Tak as Ma (馬)

A Queue Society member whose cover is selling incense and joss paper.

- Leo Tsang as Physician Tong (堂太醫)

The Imperial Royal Physician Dan Tin study under in the Forbidden City.

- Andy Wong as Nai (乃)
- Keith Mok as Fung (風)
- Dolby Kwan as Faw (火)
- Siu Koi Yan as Hoi (海)
- Deborah Poon as Tin (天)
- Tristan Cheung as Niu (鳥)

=== Extended cast ===
- Hugo Wong as Bak Long (白浪)

Kam Dai-da's lover in France. He is a poor poet who already has a wife. He lies to Dai-da that he will divorce his wife for her. After seducing Dai-da he dumps her. When he is divorced with his wife he tries to win Dai-da back but she no longer loves him by then.

- Chan Wing-chun as Eunuch Chui (崔公公)

A former high-ranking eunuch and Chui Jun-sing's uncle who he was living off of because he has many priceless artifacts in his possession. The three eunuchs remember him as kind and always looking out for them in the palace.

- Kayley Chung as Consort Shu (淑妃)

A royal consort that Siu-fung attends to in the Forbidden City.

- Gloria Tang as Mong Liu (夢蕾)

A prostitute who lived in the same dingy neighborhood as the three eunuchs. She tries to trick Siu-fung into selling himself as a slave.

- Man Yeung as Sa Dam (沙膽)

The loan shark and debt collector from the village gambling parlor. He is also a part-time assassin for hire.

- Ngai Wai-man as Physician Wong (黃大夫)

The only Chinese medical physician in the town. He is a fraud who falsely diagnose and wrongly prescribe medicine to his patients. His cover is blown when he lies about his credentials to the eunuchs that he was a royal imperial physician.

- Ricky Chan Chun-wah as Bit Dou (別都)

A western medical doctor of India descent who refuses to treat people unless they have money. He becomes sworn brothers with Suk-gung and Tin when they give him money to save his son. Desperate for money he takes Ng Yin-cho and Law Hai money in order to frame Jun-sing for selling tainted soy sauce.

- Doris Chow as Hung (虹)

A nurse at the western hospital who refuse to treat patients unless they have money.

- Jack Hui as Ko Gwan (高軍)

Chiu Jun-sing's friend hired by Jun-sing to pose as Kam Heung's would be husband. He is actually a wanted criminal.

- Wong Wai-tong as Gold teeth Kui (金牙驅)

A child abductor who traded children on the black market. Wan Tai-tse was one of his customers. The Kams sold him as a slave to the Americas.

- Stephen Ho as Captain Sek (石隊長)

Head of the village police force.

- Glen Lee as Doctor Koo (古醫生)

The new doctor at the western hospital when But Dou skips town after taking Ng Yin-cho and Law Hai money to frame Jun-sing.

- Koo Koon-chung as Seung Sing (常勝)

A death row inmate Jun-sing saves and befriends in prison. He is a bandit gang leader who is saved by his gang during execution.

- Steve Lee as Wu Ma (胡麻)

A warlord that Jun-sing is a subordinate of when he takes on the identity of Ko Chiu.

- Jess Sum as Hau Sin (巧善)

A former Qing palace maid Suk-gung is acquainted with. After leaving the forbidden city, she marries an abusive husband.

- Raymond Tsang as Liu Biu (廖標)

Hau Sin's abusive husband. He and his wife manage and own an awful noodle shop that they rent from the Kams.

- Ivana Wong (王舒銳) as Man Gee (漫 之)

A prostitute that Siu-fung (aka Sai Gai) hires to help him pretend he is a bad person in order to make Kam Dai-nam no longer want to marry him.

== Development ==
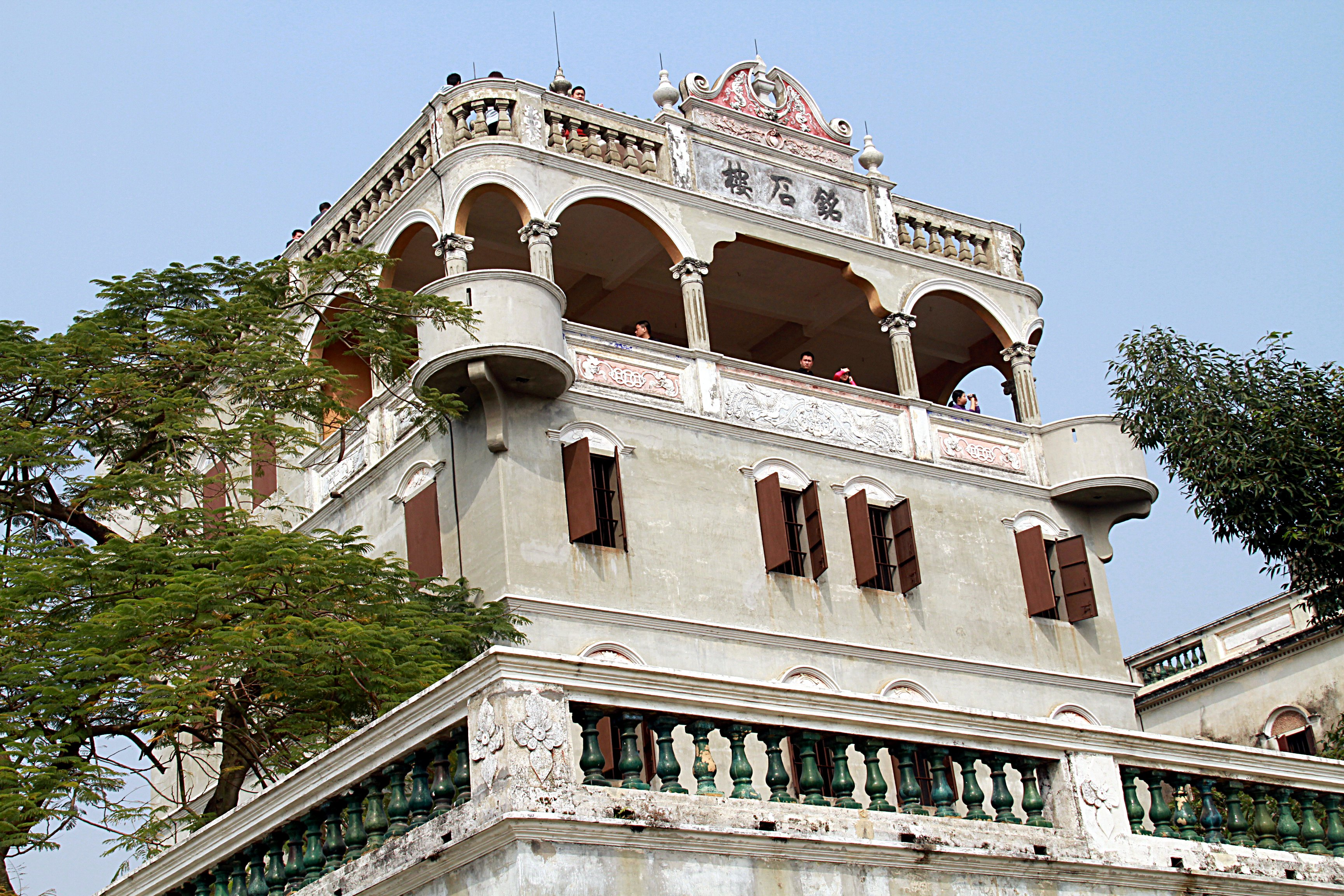
Kaiping Diaolou in Zili village, Kaiping, Guangdong Province, China

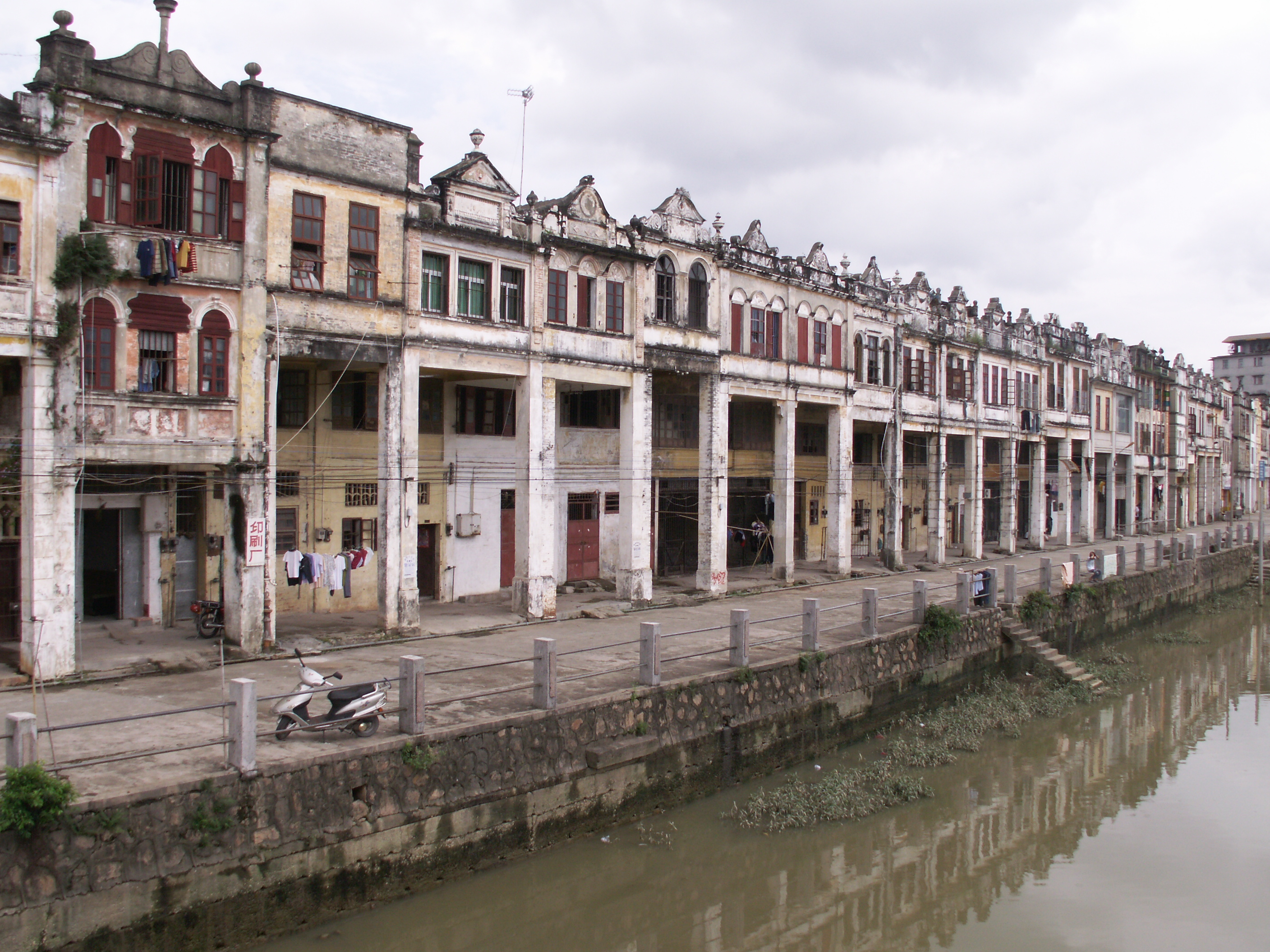
Dixi Road in Chikan, Kaiping, Guangdong Province, China

- The drama was originally titled The Five Eunuchs (太監五虎), which was to feature the main cast of The Confidant. A sales presentation released in 2013 differs from the current drama plot as it shows the five eunuchs stealing a mysterious treasure after the death of Empress Dowager Cixi. The fifty-nine second clip starred Wayne Lai, Raymond Wong, Edwin Siu, Power Chan, Raymond Cho, Maggie Shiu, Nancy Wu, and Kenny Wong.
- Ada Choi was originally cast as the female lead, but due to the start of production delayed, she had to decline participation. Nancy Wu, a co-star, filled in her role and Rosina Lam was then cast in Wu's original role.
- Also due to scheduling conflicts, Raymond Wong Ho-yin could not reunite with his The Confidant and Overachievers co-stars as he was scheduled to film Captain of Destiny, but was unable to film either dramas when he was diagnosed with a rare Behçet's disease .
- The costume fitting ceremony was held on February 9, 2015 at 12:30 pm Tseung Kwan O TVB City Studio One.
- The blessing ceremony was held on March 11, 2015 at 4:00 pm Tseung Kwan O TVB City Studio Twelve.
- Filming took place from February till July 2015 on location in Hong Kong and Kaiping, China. Kaping, China scenes where filmed in July at Zili village (立園景區). Major filming locations were the Kaiping Diaolou towers in Kaiping County, Guangdong province, China which served as the exterior of the Kam family manor and Dixi Road in Chikan, Kaiping.
- John Chiang suffered chest pain during filming. He was rushed to the hospital by co-star and his real-life son-in-law Raymond Cho. Producer Marco Law rearranged the filming schedule in order to accommodate Chiang's recovery.
- A promo image of Short End of the Stick was featured in TVB's 2016 calendar for the month of April.

== Historical inaccuracies ==
- Episode 1 - Consort Wenxiu also known as Consort Shu, born in 1909 was only thirteen years old when she became Emperor Puyi's consort in 1922. Her real age of the year 1923 should be fourteen, but in the drama she is depicted as a grown young woman being attended to by Chan Siu-fung.
- Episode 4 - Lee Suk-gung and Dan Tin mentions that Li Lianying was beheaded and buried without his body. The drama is depicted during the early 1920s which this fact was not known yet. During the Red Guard revolutionary from 1966 until 1976, Li's grave was found with only his skull in it when it was vandalized by the Red Guards.

== Viewership ratings ==
Timeslot (HKT)	#	Week	Episode(s)	Average points	Peaking points
Mon – Fri (8:30-9:30 pm); 20:30–21:30	1	09 – 12 Feb 2016	1 – 4	24	--
Mon – Fri (8:30-9:30 pm); 20:30–21:30	2	15 – 19 Feb 2016	5 – 9	29	33
Mon – Fri (8:30-9:30 pm); 20:30–21:30	3	22 – 26 Feb 2016	10 – 14	29	--
Mon – Fri (8:30-9:30 pm); 20:30–21:30	4	29 Feb – 04 Mar 2016	15 – 19	28	--
Mon – Fri (8:30-9:30 pm); 20:30–21:30	5	07 – 11 Mar 2016	20 – 24	29.7	32.8
Mon – Fri (8:30-9:30 pm); 20:30–21:30	6	14 – 18 Mar 2016	25 – 29	--	--
Mon – Fri (8:30-9:30 pm); 20:30–21:30	7	21 – 25 Mar 2016	30 – 34	29	--
Mon – Fri (8:30-9:30 pm); 20:30–21:30	7	(Sun) 27 Mar 2016	35	28	--
Total average				28.1	33

== International broadcast ==
Country	Network	Airing Date	Timeslot		
Malaysia	Astro On Demand	February 9, 2016	Monday – Friday 8:30 – 9:15 pm		
Malaysia	8TV; TV2	October 11, 2016	November 24, 2017	Monday - Friday 6:00 - 7:00 pm	Monday – Friday 7:00 – 8:00 pm
Australia	TVBJ	February 9, 2016	Monday – Friday 7:15 – 8:15 pm		
Singapore	Starhub TV	May 11, 2016	Monday – Sunday 9:00 – 10:00 pm		

== Awards and nominations ==
Year	Ceremony	Category	Nominee	Result
2016	StarHub TVB Awards	My Favourite TVB Drama	Short End of the Stick	Nominated
2016	StarHub TVB Awards	My Favourite TVB Actor	Wayne Lai	Won
2016	StarHub TVB Awards	My Favourite TVB Supporting Actress	Natalie Tong	Nominated
2016	StarHub TVB Awards	My Favourite TVB Supporting Actress	Rosina Lam	Won
2016	StarHub TVB Awards	My Favourite TVB Supporting Actor	Power Chan	Nominated
2016	StarHub TVB Awards	My Favourite TVB Supporting Actor	Raymond Cho	Won
2016	StarHub TVB Awards	My Favourite TVB Female TV Character	Rosina Lam	Nominated
2016	StarHub TVB Awards	My Favourite TVB Male TV Character	Wayne Lai	Nominated
2016	TVB Star Awards Malaysia	My Favourite TVB Drama Series	Short End of the Stick	Nominated
2016	TVB Star Awards Malaysia	My Favourite TVB Actor in a Leading Role	Wayne Lai	Nominated
2016	TVB Star Awards Malaysia	My Favourite TVB Actress in a Supporting Role	Rosina Lam	Nominated
2016	TVB Star Awards Malaysia	My Favourite TVB Actor in a Supporting Role	Power Chan	Nominated
2016	TVB Star Awards Malaysia	My Favourite TVB Actor in a Supporting Role	Raymond Cho	Nominated
2016	TVB Star Awards Malaysia	My Favourite Top 15 TVB Drama Characters	Wayne Lai	Won
2016	TVB Star Awards Malaysia	My Favourite Top 15 TVB Drama Characters	Raymond Cho	Nominated
2016	TVB Star Awards Malaysia	My Favourite Top 15 TVB Drama Characters	Rosina Lam	Nominated
2016	TVB Star Awards Malaysia	My Favourite TVB On Screen Couple	Wayne Lai & Nancy Wu	Nominated
2016	TVB Star Awards Malaysia	My Favourite TVB On Screen Couple	Raymond Cho & Rosina Lam	Nominated
2016	TVB Anniversary Awards	Best Series	Short End of the Stick	Nominated
2016	TVB Anniversary Awards	Best Actor	Wayne Lai	Nominated
2016	TVB Anniversary Awards	Most Popular TV Male Character	Wayne Lai	Nominated
2016	TVB Anniversary Awards	Most Popular TV Male Character	Raymond Cho	Nominated
2016	TVB Anniversary Awards	Most Popular TV Female Character	Rosina Lam	Nominated
2016	TVB Anniversary Awards	My Favourite TVB Actor in a Supporting Role	Power Chan	Nominated
2016	TVB Anniversary Awards	My Favourite TVB Actor in a Supporting Role	Raymond Cho	Won
2016	TVB Anniversary Awards	My Favourite TVB Actor in a Supporting Role	John Chiang	Nominated
2016	TVB Anniversary Awards	My Favourite TVB Actor in a Supporting Role	Willie Wai	Nominated
2016	TVB Anniversary Awards	Most Popular TV Female Character	Rosina Lam	Nominated
2016	TVB Anniversary Awards	Most Popular TV Female Character	Yoyo Chen	Nominated
2016	TVB Anniversary Awards	Most Popular Series Partnership	Wayne Lai, Edwin Siu, Raymond Cho & Power Chan	Nominated
2016	TVB Anniversary Awards	Most Popular Series Song	Blue Sky (藍天白雲) by Sammy Sum	Nominated
