= The Confidant =

Hong Kong television series

- 大太監
- Genre: Historical fiction
- Created by: Catherine Tsang; Marco Law
- Written by: Kwan Chung-ling
- Directed by: Fong Chun-chiu
- Starring: Michelle Yim; Wayne Lai; Raymond Wong Ho-yin; Nancy Wu; Natalie Tong; Maggie Shiu; Raymond Cho; Power Chan; Edwin Siu; Aimee Chan; Oscar Leung; Chung King-fai; Cheung Kwok-keung; Elliot Ngok; Selena Li
- Opening theme: Seung Yu Yi Mut (相濡以沫) by Shirley Kwan
- Ending theme: Yat Yuet (日月) by Wayne Lai and Nancy Wu
- Composers: Tang Chi-wai; Yip Siu-chung
- Country of origin: Hong Kong
- Original languages: Cantonese; Mandarin
- No. of episodes: 33

Production
- Executive producer: Marco Law
- Production locations: Hong Kong; Hengdian World Studios
- Camera setup: Multi camera
- Running time: 45 minutes
- Production company: TVB

Original release
- Network: Jade; HD Jade
- Release: 5 November – 16 December 2012

The Confidant
- title screen
- Traditional Chinese: 大太監
- Simplified Chinese: 大太监
- Literal meaning: "great imperial eunuch"
Transcriptions
Standard Mandarin
- Hanyu Pinyin: Dà Tàijiàn
Yue: Cantonese
- Yale Romanization: Daai6 Taai3 Gaam3
- Jyutping: Daai6 Taai3 Gaam3

The Confidant (Traditional Chinese: 大太監; jyutping: Daai6 Taai3 Gaam3) is a Hong Kong biographical fiction television drama produced by TVB under executive producer Marco Law, and stars Michelle Yim as Empress Dowager Cixi, and Wayne Lai as imperial eunuch Li Lianying. The drama depicts how a group of eunuchs survive in the weakening Qing empire, and closely traces Li's early life from the first day he entered the imperial palace to becoming one of the most powerful political figures in the latter years of the Qing Dynasty. The drama also follows Li's relationship with Cixi, and how he eventually becomes her closest confidant.

Filming began on 16 December 2011 in Hong Kong, and ended on 9 April 2012 in the Hengdian World Studios. The Confident Eunuch premiered the first two episodes on 1 November 2012 at The Grand Cinema in Tsim Sha Tsui, Kowloon. It has received positive reviews from critics and viewers thus far. With a total of 33 produced episodes, The Confidant started its broadcast on Hong Kong's Jade and HD Jade channels on 5 November 2012.

The series has an indirect sequel, Short End of the Stick (2016).

== Synopsis ==
Lei Lin-ying (Wayne Lai) and On Tak-hoi (Raymond Cho) came from poor families and were sold to become palace eunuchs at a young age. The two later become apprentices of senior eunuch Lau Dor-sang (Chung King-fai) and developed a deep brotherly relationship. Both became important high-ranked officials for Empress Dowager Cixi (Michelle Yim). Unfortunately, Tak-hoi had a heart of greed and eventually his relationship with the careful Lin-ying started drifting apart. Chan Fuk (Elliot Ngok) is the head of the eunuchs, but he saw he was losing his authority because Lin-ying and Tak-hoi won the Empress' favor. He started plotting against the two, but Lin-ying was fortunate to have palace maid Sin-yung (Nancy Wu) and the eunuch pharmacist, Yiu Sheung-hei (Raymond Wong Ho-yin) assistance. Meanwhile, it's time for the Tongzhi Emperor (Oscar Leung) to choose his empress, which worried Empress Dowager Ci'an (Maggie Shiu) that Cixi may get even more powerful. She joins forces with Prince Kung (Cheung Kwok-keung) to drive Cixi into an isolated and helpless position. ..

== Cast and characters ==
Character names are in Cantonese romanisation.

=== Royal family ===
- Michelle Yim as Empress Dowager Chee-hei (慈禧太后), the current de facto ruler of China, and Tung-chi's mother.
- Maggie Shiu as Empress Dowager Chee-on (慈安太后), the co-de facto ruler of China.
- Oscar Leung as the Tung-chi Emperor (同治帝), the teenage son of Chee-hei, and the current emperor of China.
- Natalie Tong as Empress Bo-yum (寶音皇后), a relative of Chee-on and Tung-chi's wife
- Cheung Kwok-keung portrays Imperial Prince Kung (恭親王), Tung-chi's uncle.
- Aimee Chan as Princess Wo-shek (和碩公主), Tung-chi's aunt.
- Selena Li portrays Dowager Concubine Yuen (婉太繽), Ham-fung Emperor's concubine residing in King-yan Palace.

=== Imperial servants ===
- Wayne Lai as Lei Lin-ying (李連英), the main protagonist, a eunuch who initially serves Concubine Yuen and become fourth-ranking Head of Eunuch.
- Raymond Cho as On Tak-hoi (安德海), a seventh-ranking eunuch who directly serves under Empress Dowager Chee-hei, and Lin-ying's best friend.
- Raymond Wong Ho-yin as Yiu Sheung-hei (姚雙喜), a seventh-ranking eunuch who serves in the medical department.
- Edwin Siu as Ling Tim-sau (凌添壽), a eunuch, and Lin-ying's apprentice and a seventh-ranking eunuch.
- Power Chan as Pang Sam-shun (彭三順), a seventh-ranking eunuch who serves in the management bureau.
- Nancy Wu as Sin-yung (倩蓉), a palace maid who initially serves Concubine Yuen.
- Elliot Ngok as Chan Fuk (陳福), the fourth-ranking Head Eunuch.
- Chung King-fai as Lau Dor-sang (劉多生), an elderly eunuch who serves in the archives room; he is also the sifu of Lin-ying and Tak-hoi.

== Production ==
=== Pre-production and casting ===
Catherine Tsang, one of the deputy chief directors of TVB's drama department, initially created the idea of producing a drama based on Li Lianying. A pre-production trailer was filmed in late 2010 for TVB's 2011 Sales Production Presentation, and it was the last and longest trailer to broadcast at the ceremony. At the time, the temporary cast featured in the trailer consisted of Wayne Lai as Li, Michelle Yim as Cixi, Bosco Wong as the Guangxu Emperor, Tavia Yeung as Consort Zhen, Susanna Kwan as Li's mother, with David Chiang, Elliot Ngok, and Chung King-fai as prominent government officials. When production for The Confidant was announced, only Lai was confirmed to star. The drama was originally slated to begin production in March 2011, but it was pushed back to end of the year due to production difficulties.

In October 2011, TVB confirmed that the drama would begin filming in December 2011, and would move its location filming to Hengdian World Studios in March 2012. To compete with the three new free broadcasting television stations in Hong Kong, TVB invested an additional 40 percent to the production budget. Maggie Cheung Ho-yee, Maggie Shiu, Ruco Chan, and Raymond Wong Ho-yin were officially announced to join the cast in October 2011. A few weeks later, Chan was pulled out of the cast to film another TVB drama, No Good Either Way, instead. His role, An Dehai, was replaced by Raymond Cho. In November 2011, it was revealed that Nancy Wu, Edwin Siu and Aimee Chan would join the cast through their radio interviews and official Weibo fansites. Helen Ma announced through her Weibo that she and Elliot Ngok, an original cast member from the sales presentation trailer, would join the cast, and Oscar Chan uploaded a picture of his casting call on his Weibo. Natalie Tong, Power Chan, and original cast member Chung King-fai were confirmed to join later on.

The official press conference and costume fitting for The Confidant was planned to be held on 24 November at TVB City, but due to costume problems, the presscon was cancelled. A few days before filming began, Maggie Cheung withdrew from production due to scheduling conflicts. Her role, Cixi, was replaced by Michelle Yim, who originally portrayed Cixi in the drama's sales presentation trailer.

=== Filming ===
Filming officially began on 16 December. Production was planned to be moved to Hengdian World Studios on March 12, however, it was postponed to a week later due to the date of Hong Kong International Film & TV Market. The filming in Hong Kong ended on March 10, followed by a supper at night. At 22 March 19:30pm, the trailer shown in FILMART is broadcast on Jade and HD Jade with a line "aired in 2012 eye-catchingly".

On 19 March, the cast went to Hengdian at night and a pray was held on the next day. Filming ended on 9 April and the main cast flew back to Hong Kong on 12 April.

== Awards and nominations ==
=== Accolades ===
Year	Award	Category	Recipient	Top 5	Result
2012	My AOD Favourites Awards	My Favourite Drama Series	The Confidant	Entered	Nominated
2012	My AOD Favourites Awards	My Favourite Actor in a Leading Role	Wayne Lai	Entered	Nominated
2012	My AOD Favourites Awards	My Favourite Actress in a Leading Role	Michelle Yim	Entered	Nominated
2012	My AOD Favourites Awards	My Top 15 Favourite TV Characters	Michelle Yim	N/A	Nominated
2012	My AOD Favourites Awards	My Top 15 Favourite TV Characters	Wayne Lai	N/A	Won
2012	TVB Anniversary Awards	Best Drama	The Confidant	Entered	Nominated
2012	TVB Anniversary Awards	Best Actor	Wayne Lai	Entered	Won
2012	TVB Anniversary Awards	Best Actress	Michelle Yim	Entered	Nominated
2012	TVB Anniversary Awards	Best Supporting Actor	Power Chan	N/A	Nominated
2012	TVB Anniversary Awards	Best Supporting Actor	Elliot Ngok	N/A	Nominated
2012	TVB Anniversary Awards	Best Supporting Actress	Aimee Chan	N/A	Nominated
2012	TVB Anniversary Awards	My Favourite Male Character	Wayne Lai	N/A	Nominated
2012	TVB Anniversary Awards	My Favourite Male Character	Raymond Wong Ho-yin	N/A	Nominated
2012	TVB Anniversary Awards	My Favourite Female Character	Michelle Yim	N/A	Nominated
2012	TVB Anniversary Awards	Most Improved Male Artiste	Oscar Leung	N/A	Won
2012	TVB Anniversary Awards	Most Improved Male Artiste	Edwin Siu	N/A	Nominated

== Viewership ratings ==
The following is a table that includes a list of the total ratings points based on television viewership.

Week	Originally Aired	Episodes	Average Points	Peaking Points	References
1	5–9 November 2012	1 — 5	31	36	
2	12–16 November 2012	6 — 10	31	33	
3	19–23 November 2012	11 — 15	31	—	
4	26–30 November 2012	16 — 20	30	33	
5	3–7 December 2012	21 — 25	30	—	
6	10–13 December 2012	26 — 29	32	—	
6	14 December 2012	30 — 31	26	—	
6	16 December 2012	32 — 33	35	36	
6	10–16 December 2012	26 — 33	31	36	
