= Raymond Cho (actor) =

Hong Kong television actor, singer and host

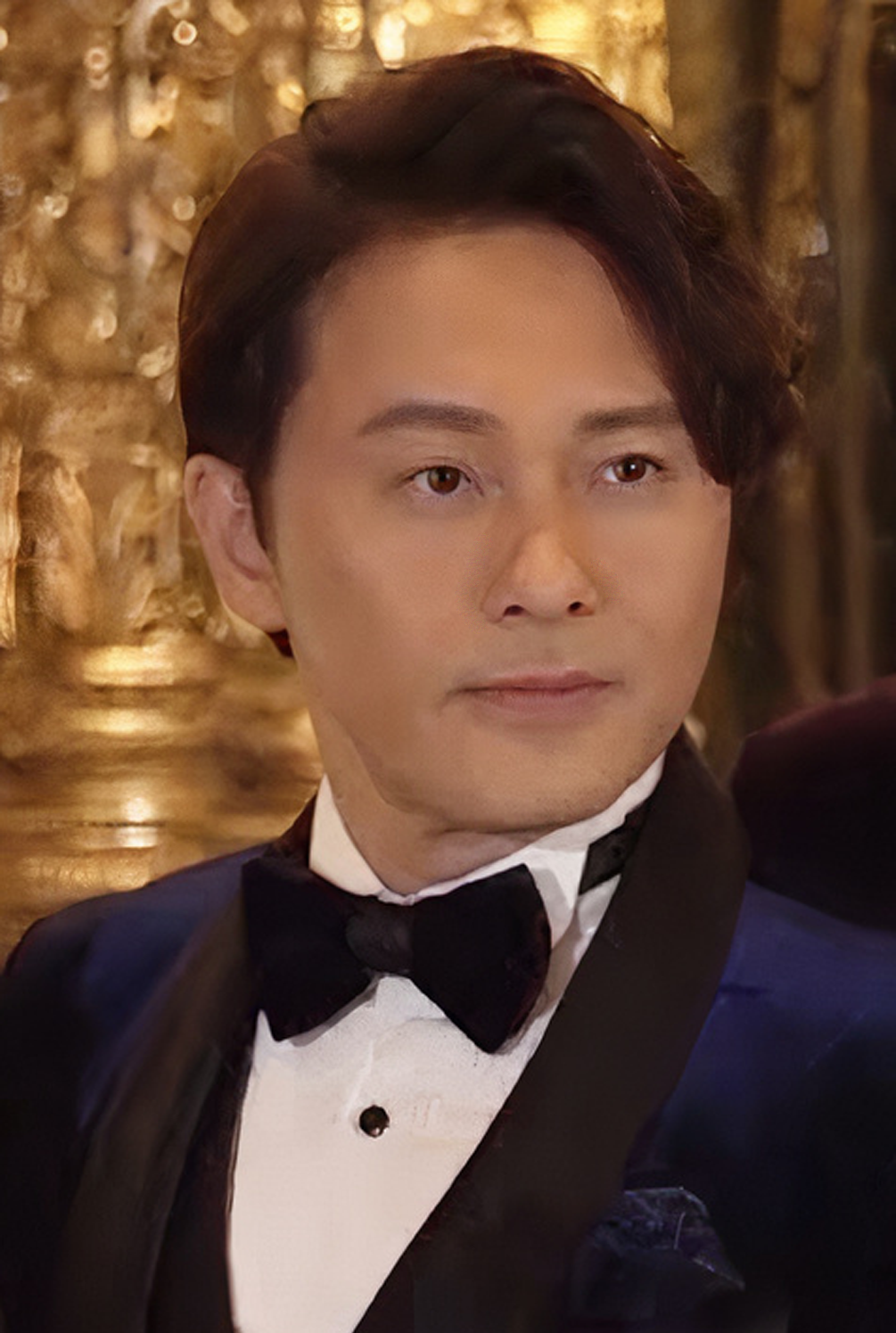
- Cho in 2019
- Born: 16 October 1964 (age 61); British Hong Kong
- Other name: Forever Cheap
- Years active: 1994–present
- Spouse: Elaine Chiang (m. 2007)
- Children: 2
- Awards: TVB Anniversary Awards – Best Supporting Actor; 2016 Short End of the Stick; Most Popular Onscreen Partnership; 2017 A General, a Scholar and a Eunuch; 2018 Two Men In A Kitchen

Chinese name
- Traditional Chinese: 曹永廉
- Simplified Chinese: 曹永廉
Transcriptions
Yue: Cantonese
- Yale Romanization: Chòu Wíhnglìm

Raymond Cho Wing-Lim (Chinese: 曹永廉, born 16 October 1964) is a Hong Kong television actor, singer and host. He currently works for the television company, TVB.

Cho began his career as a singer, winning a singing competition when he was 30 years old. After an unsuccessful attempt at being a singer, he gave acting a try. After filming some movies, he joined TVB. Notable dramas he has starred in are: Healing Hands II (2000), Healing Hands III (2005), Welcome to the House (2006), and At Home With Love (2006).

Cho married Elaine Chiang, the oldest daughter of Hong Kong actor David Chiang, on 28 November 2007. Their son, Brandon Cho, was born in 2008. Their second child, a daughter, Erin Cho, was born in 2011.

== Filmography ==
=== TV dramas ===
Year	Title	Role	Awards	Notes
1993	Twilight Tubes Part I			a.k.a. Twilight Tubes I
1995	Journey of Love	Cheung Ka-Chun		
1998	ICAC Investigators 1998	Ah Tong		
1999	Face to Face	Fong Dak-Suen		
2000	A Matter of Customs	Lam Chi-Kit		
2000	Healing Hands II	Chris Heung Chung-Yan	Nominated – TVB Anniversary Award for Most Improved Male Artiste	
2001	The Heaven Sword and Dragon Saber	Sung Ching-Shu		
2002	Invisible Journey	Chan Wai-Sing		
2002	Doomed to Oblivion	Gon Lung		Warehoused and broadcast in 2007
2002	Police Station No. 7	Yip Jou-Gong		Warehoused and broadcast in 2004
2002	The White Flame	Chris Heung Chung-Yan		Guest star Warehoused and broadcast in 2004
2002	Square Pegs	Bao Gai-Jung		
2003	Witness to a Prosecution II	General / Ma Bak-Hou		Ep. 5, 20–22
2004	Armed Reaction IV	Chan Ka-Hei		
2004	Summer Heat	Ching Tin-Chau		Warehoused and broadcast in 2006
2004	Supreme Fate	Yau Kai-Lim		
2005	Healing Hands III	Chris Heung Chung-Yan		
2005	Revolving Doors of Vengeance	Benjamin Hon Tze-Ban		
2005	Hidden Treasures	Li Man-Keung		
2005	Life Made Simple	Lok Kui-Shing		
2006	Welcome to the House	Sunny Ko Yau-Yee		
2006	Forensic Heroes	Shum Hung	Nominated – TVB Anniversary Award for Best Supporting Actor	
2006	At Home With Love	Henry Fok Ming-Hin		
2008	A Journey Called Life	Roy Kam Wing-Loi		
2008	Forensic Heroes II	Shum Hung		
2008	Moonlight Resonance	Shum Hung		Guest star (ep. 40)
2009	The Threshold of a Persona	Cheng Pak-Yu		
2009	ICAC Investigators 2009	Lee Tze-Lun		Ep. 2
2009	Off Pedder	Chris Heung Chung-Yan		Guest star
2009-2010	The Beauty of the Game	Wan Sze-Wai		
2010	Fly with Me	Frankie Tsui Wing-Fai	Nominated - TVB Anniversary Award for Best Supporting Actor	
2010	When Lanes Merge	Au Yiu-Chun		
2010	Every Move You Make	Gordon Lam		Guest star (ep. 1–2)
2010-2011	Home Troopers	Kei Wing-Fat		
2011	A Great Way to Care	Lam Wai-San		Ep. 15–17
2011	Super Snoops	Sit Cheuk		
2011	Forensic Heroes III	King Tin-shing		Guest star (ep. 21–22)
2011-2012	Bottled Passion	Tsui Ping		
2012	The Hippocratic Crush	Chin Ho-Tat		
2012	Queens of Diamonds and Hearts	Keung Chik-Yan		
2012	The Greatness of a Hero	Lee Hin		Warehoused
2012	Ghetto Justice II	Leung Pau Shing		
2012	The Confidant	On Tak-Hoi		
2013	Beauty at War	Yeung Chi-Hin		
2013	Awfully Lawful	Ming Sir		
2013	The Hippocratic Crush II	Chin Ho-Tat		
2014	Storm in a Cocoon	Kwan Cho-Yiu		
2014	Ghost Dragon of Cold Mountain	Hung Sup-Kau		
2014	Overachievers	Andy Chiang Sing		
2015	Madam Cutie On Duty	Tong Hon-Sze		
2016	Speed of Life	Au Suen-Wai		
2016	Short End of the Stick	Chan Siu-Fung	Won - TVB Anniversary Award for Best Supporting Actor Nominated - People's Choice Television Awards for Best Supporting Actor (Top 5)	
2016	Presumed Accidents	Lai Yat-Ming		
2016	Come Home Love: Dinner at 8	Koo Hiu-Yeung		
2016	Law dis-Order	Duncan Yam Wai-Leung		
2017	Provocateur	Vincent Hong Yat-Fung		Guest star
2017	My Dearly Sinful Mind	Wong Chong Hin / "Edmund" / Dr. Wong		
2017	A General, a Scholar and a Eunuch	Zuo Guangdou (later named Fung Yat-bo)	Won - TVB Anniversary Award for Most Popular Onscreen Partnership (with Edwin Siu and Matthew Ho)	
2017	My Ages Apart	Sung Lai (young version)		Guest Appearance
2018	The Learning Curve of a Warlord	Koo Lok-Lo		
2019	ICAC Investigators	Ma Chi-Keung		Guest star
2019	Girlie Days	Cheung Chi-Keung	Nominated — TVB Anniversary Award for Best Actor	
2019	Justice Bao: The First Year	Gongsun Ce		
2021	Beauty And The Boss	So Chak-Kei	Nominated — TVB Anniversary Award for Best Supporting Actor; Nominated — TVB Anniversary Award for Most Popular Male Character	
2021	Used Good	Tse Tim-Shing		
2022	Brutally Young 2.0	Ho Tai-Yung		
2022	Your Highness	Fok Ching-shan		
2023	Golden Bowl	Man Shui	Nominated — TVB Anniversary Award for Best Supporting Actor	
2023	Narcotics Heroes	Yeung Sheung-wing	Nominated — TVB Anniversary Award for Best Supporting Actor	
TBA	神耆小子	Chin Kai-loi		

=== Film ===
Year	Title	Role	Notes
1995	Hong Kong Graffiti	Ko Chee	
1995	Tragic Commitment	Lu Hao Chang	
1995	Black Dream		
1996	Boy's?	Raymond	
1996	Growing Up	Albert Cheng	
1996	Best of the Best	Kwan Hong Hing	a.k.a. Final Option 2
1997	Love, Amoeba Style		a.k.a. Love: Amoeba Style
1997	Up for the Rising Sun	Tung Chin	
1997	L - O - V - E ..... LOVE		
1997	Full Alert	Chan Wah	
1997	Don't Tell My Partner		
1997	Love Cruise	Wong Wai Man	
1998	The Love and Sex of the Eastern Hollywood	King	
1998	Operation Billionaires	Officer Wong	a.k.a. Operation Billionaire
1998	B is for Boy		a.k.a. B for Boy a.k.a. Story of Young Generation
1998	A Long and Forgotten Ghost Story		
1998	Wipe Out		
1999	Bloody Lie		
1999	Nothing is Forever		
1999	Fourteen Days Before Suicide		
1999	The Doctor in Spite of Himself	Ma	
1999	Bodyguard for the Dead	Mr. Cho	a.k.a. Body Guard for the Dead
1999	Unexpectable Killing	Paul	
1999	The House of No Man	Hoi / Sea Monster	a.k.a. Woman House
1999	The Three Brothers		a.k.a. 3 Brothers
2000	Half Cigar		
2000	No Sweat		
2000	Run		
2000	Spiritual Reclamation		
2000	Thunder Scout		
2001	Final Romance	Dr. Peter Chan	a.k.a. Wishing Tree
2001	The Saving Hands	Fred	
2002	The Troublesome Romance	Ka Fei	
2003	My Sassy Boyfriend	Victor	
2003	True Love 2003	Sam	
2003	The Secret Society - Boss	Hui Chi Wah	
2003	The Secret Society - The Best Hack	Hui Chi Wah	
2003	The Threat		
2004	The Infernal Fighter		
2004	The Healing Spirit		
2005	Wedding in Hell	Dick	a.k.a. Ghost Story
2005	2 Young	Ken's assistant	
2006	The House of the Sword		
2007	In Love with the Dead	Wai's doctor	
2009	Look for a Star	Frank	a.k.a. Looking For a Star
2010	72 Tenants of Prosperity	Heung Chung Yan (Chris)	
2011	I Love Hong Kong		

== Political participation ==
Cho is amongst many Hong Kong celebrities with patriotic stances in support of Chinese nationalism, usually expressing speeches on his social media sites backing The Government of the Hong Kong Special Administration Region, and the Chief Executives Leung Chun-ying (from the 2014 Hong Kong protests) and the incumbent Carrie Lam. Most of Cho's speeches are unpleasant on specific politicians or actors in favour from the pro-democratic camp, which has led to doxxing and death threats while gaining appreciation by the medias of and supporters from the pro-Beijing camp.

In 2016, Cho posted a message on Weibo, which he regarded the Rules of Law in Hong Kong "is dying" when the Spokesman of Hong Kong Indigenous - Edward Leung in 2016 Mong Kok civil unrest was judged as innocence.

On 20 May 2019, Cho responded on a Facebook news article written about activist Joshua Wong, and made a post celebrating Wong's time in jail. Afterwards, he replied: "希望佢快啲香" (Cantonese: "Wishing him a death very soon"). Cho's replies garnered massive controversy around the internet sphere as numerous Hong Kong netizens back. Cho then added with a provocative tone that he would not argue with “trash when it is meaningless”.
