= Overachievers =

Hong Kong television series

- Official poster
- 名門暗戰
- Genre: Drama
- Created by: TVB
- Directed by: Ho Wing Lin; Lai Chun; Yeung Suet Yee; Au Ka Wai; Lo Wan Fong; Leung Man Chi
- Starring: Wayne Lai; Raymond Wong; Edwin Siu; Power Chan; Raymond Cho; Nancy Wu; Maggie Shiu; Susanna Kwan; Elliot Ngok; Grace Chan; Sisley Choi; Fred Cheng; Jason Chan; Yoyo Chen
- Opening theme: True Lies 真實謊言 by Susanna Kwan
- Ending theme: Surrender 投降吧 by Fred Cheng; The Place 地方 by Fred Cheng
- Country of origin: Hong Kong
- Original language: Cantonese
- No. of episodes: 30

Production
- Producer: Marco Law
- Production location: Hong Kong
- Editor: Kwan Chung-ling
- Running time: 45 minutes
- Production company: TVB

Original release
- Network: TVB Jade, HD Jade
- Release: 4 November – 14 December 2014

Overachievers
- Traditional Chinese: 名門暗戰
- Literal meaning: "Hidden War Within the Noble Family"
Transcriptions
Standard Mandarin
- Hanyu Pinyin: Míng Mén Àn Zhàn
Yue: Cantonese
- Jyutping: Ming4 Mun4 Ngaam3 Zin3

Overachievers (Chinese: 名門暗戰) is a 30-episode Hong Kong television drama produced by Marco Law for TVB and stars Wayne Lai, Raymond Wong, Edwin Siu, Power Chan, Raymond Cho, Nancy Wu and Maggie Shiu.

== Synopsis ==
Unhappy about being under his father Chiang Shing Tin's constant and unreasonable control, Chiang Yuen/Mike is determined to break free from his family business to start up a company of his own. After many obstacles and failures, he receives help from Hugo, Mandy, and Siu Tien, and finally begins his cellphone application company. Desperate to prove to his father that he can become just as successful as him, Mike prepares to confront his father on the business front, especially when it becomes apparent that his father wants to crush his ambitions because he isn't his biological son.

On the other hand, Chiang Shing Tin's second son, Chiang Sing/Andy, begins to lose his status in the family because of his lack of capabilities. He has constant problems with his wife because he suspects her of having had an affair with his third brother, Chiang Tsun/Louie. Unbeknownst to everyone, Louie is actually gay and has been hiding in the closet for years. Through all these trials, Chiang Shing Tin's wife, Chau Ping, struggles to keep the family together, torn by her desire to help her biological son, Louie, rise to the helm and caring for her stepchildren, Mike and Andy.

Midway, after Mandy breaks up with him due to his refusal to let her know him for who he truly is, Hugo loses it and decides to surrender to the cold-blooded, power-hungry sociopath that he really is. He kills Louie after the latter threatens to go to the police about a murder he knows Hugo committed. He even marries the Chiang family's only daughter, Abby, using her to get into the firm and snatch the position of chairman from an ailing Chiang Shing Tin who suffers two debilitating strokes. He also sleeps with Ivy, Chiang Shing Tin's mistress, and uses her to gain more footing in his unscrupulous plans to introduce a virtual currency that will replace physical cash. Eventually, Hugo goes after Mike, furious that the latter tried to slow down his plans when they had worked together earlier. He ends up trying to kill Mandy because he can't accept she no longer loves him and is instead in a relationship with Chau Kan (Chau Ping's brother and Mike's uncle). Instead, he ends up getting Mike's pregnant wife, Flora, killed.

In the end, a mentally ill Andy stabs Hugo to death as the latter accepts an entrepreneurial award. Mike ends up taking over his father's company and revitalizing the business.

== Cast ==
=== The Chiang family ===
| Cast | Role | Description |
|---|---|---|
| Elliot Ngok 岳華 | Chiang Sing-Tin 蔣承天 | Hong Kong's richest man Adopted father of Chiang Yuen; Father of Chiang Sing, Chiang Chun, Chiang Lai and Chiang Li; Husband of Lee Chau Ping |
| Susanna Kwan 關菊英 | Lee Chau Ping 李秋萍 | Chiang Sing-Tin's second wife Chiang Chun and Chiang Lai's mother Chiang Yuen and Chiang Sing's stepmother Not only has to keep her family together, but also withstand others who challenge the first wife position |
| Wayne Lai 黎耀祥 | Chiang Yuen, Mike 蔣元 | Adopted Son of Chiang Sing-Tin; Fa-lai's first love Does not care about money; only does business out of interest Son of Chiang Sing-Tin's first wife |
| Raymond Cho 曹永廉 | Chiang Sing, Andy 蔣昇 | Chiang Sing-Tin's second son Younger brother of Chiang Yuen; Older half-brother of Chiang Chun and Chiang Lai; Son of Chiang Sing-Tin's first wife Husband of Tong Ching |
| Yoyo Chen 陳自瑤 | Tong Ching 湯晴 | Chiang Sing's wife Has hazy relationship with Chiang Chun |
| Jason Chan 陳智燊 | Chiang Chun, Louie 蔣進 | Chiang Sing-Tin's third son Younger half-brother of Chiang Yuen and Chiang Sing; Older brother of Chiang Lai; Son of Lee Chau Ping |
| Grace Chan 陳凱琳 | Chiang Lai, Abby 蔣勵 | Chiang Sing-Tin's daughter Younger half-sister of Chiang Yuen and Chiang Sing; Chiang Tsun's younger sister Daughter of Lee Chau Ping; Later involved in a love triangle with Chung Hiu-Yeung/Hugo and Ting Man-Chi/Mandy; Yuen Siu-Tin's love interest Falls in love with Hugo |

=== Other cast ===
| Cast | Role | Description |
|---|---|---|
| Raymond Wong Ho-yin 黃浩然 | Hugo, Chung Hiu Yeung 鍾曉陽 | Chiang Yuen's business partner Has a relationship with Ting Man-Chi; Major Villain |
| Edwin Siu 蕭正楠 | Yuen Siu-Tin 袁小田 | Thai boxer Friend of Chiang Yuen; Later involved in a love triangle with Ma Siu-Ming and Chiang Lai; Father of Ma Siu-Ming's unborn child |
| Power Chan 陳國邦 | Lee Chau Kan 李秋芹 | Lee Chau Ping's younger brother Uncle of Chiang Yuen, Chiang Sing, Chiang Tsun and Chiang Lai; Likes Ting Man-Chi |
| Nancy Wu 胡定欣 | Ting Man-Chi, Mandy (Ah Man) 丁漫姿 | Chiang Yuen's assistant Has relationship with Raymond Wong; Later involved in a love triangle between Chung Hiu-Yeung/Hugo and Chiang Lai; Love interest of Lee Chau Kan |
| Maggie Shiu 邵美琪 | Kwan Fa-lai, Flora 關花拉 | Chiang Yuen's first love Ko Hing's aunt and adoptive mother Wife of Sunny (deceased) |
| Sisley Choi 蔡思貝 | Ma Siu-Ming 馬小明 | In charge of a boxing club left by her father Later involved in a triangle relationship with Yuen Siu-Tin and Chiang Lai; Pregnant with Yuen Siu-Tin's baby Miscarried in Episode 19 |
| Fred Cheng 鄭俊弘 | Ko Hing 高興 | Fa-lai's autistic nephew and adopted son Likes to sing and play the violin |
| Ali Lee 李佳芯 | Yu Si Lam, Ivy 余詩琳 | Chiang Sing-Tin's mistress Chiang Li, Lily's mother Major Villain |

== Viewership ratings ==
| Week | Episodes | Date | Average Points | Peaking Points |
|---|---|---|---|---|
| 1 | 1 - 5 | November 3–7, 2014 | 24 | 26 |
| 2 | 6 - 10 | November 10–14, 2014 | 23 | 24 |
| 3 | 11－14 | November 17–21, 2014 | 24 | 26 |
| 4 | 15－19 | November 24–28, 2014 | 23 | 25 |
| 5 | 20－24 | December 1–5, 2014 | 22 | 24 |
| 6 | 25- 30 | December 8–14, 2014 | 25 | 31 |
