= Yueh Hua =

Chinese-born Canadian actor (1942–2018)

- Chinese: 岳華
- Born: Leung Lok-wah (梁樂華); 13 July 1942; Shanghai, China
- Died: 20 October 2018 (aged 76); Vancouver, British Columbia, Canada
- Other names: Elliot Ngok, Ngok Wah, Yo Hua
- Occupation: Actor
- Years active: 1964–2018
- Spouse: Tien Lie

Chinese name
- Traditional Chinese: 岳華
- Simplified Chinese: 岳华
Transcriptions
Standard Mandarin
- Hanyu Pinyin: Yuè Huá
Yue: Cantonese
- Jyutping: Ngok^{6} Waa^{4}

Signature
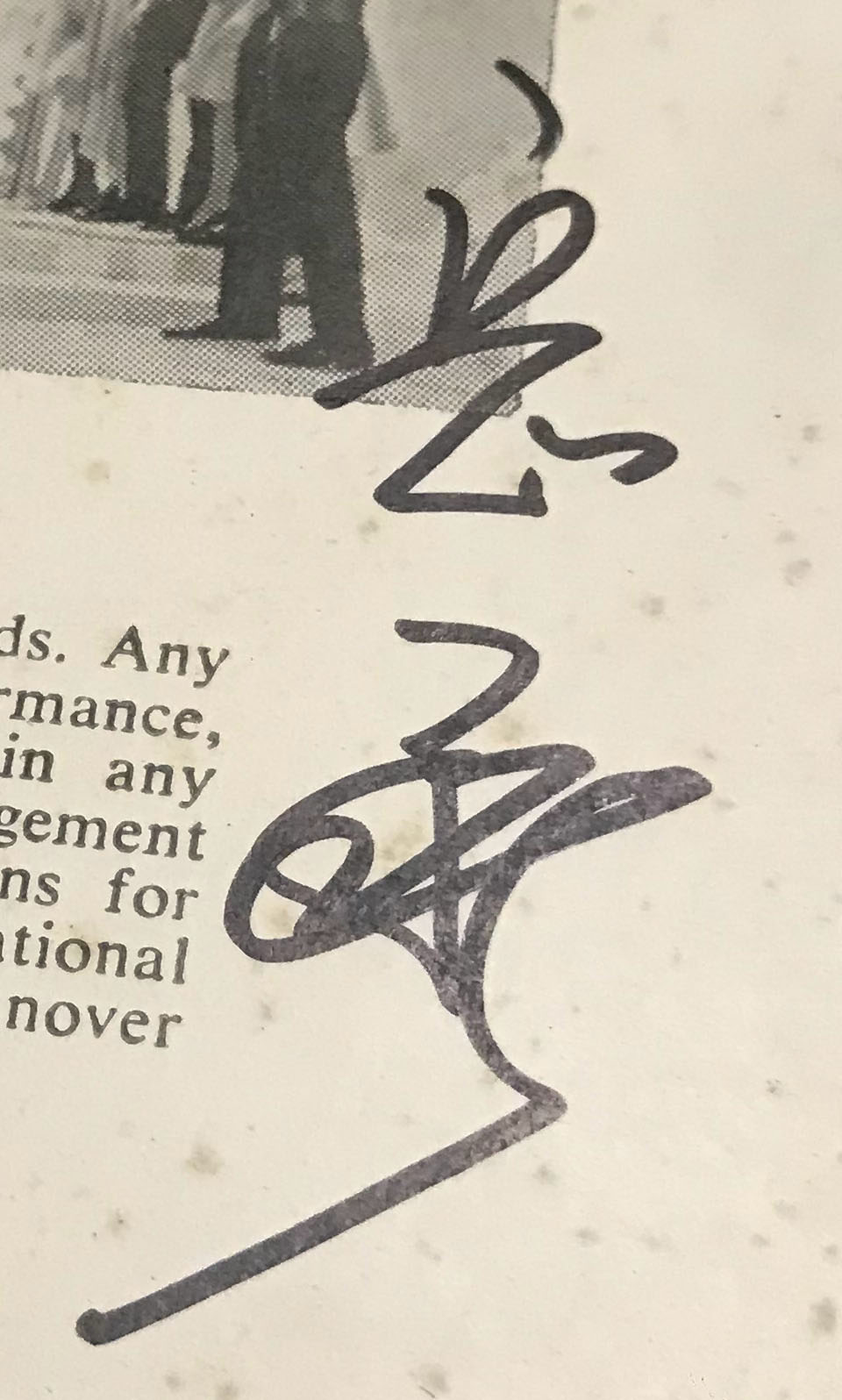

Yueh Hua (Chinese: 岳華; pinyin: Yuè Huá; 14 July 1942 – 20 October 2018), also known professionally as Elliot Ngok Wah, was a Shanghai-born Hong Kong actor, later based in Canada, with Shaw Brothers Studio and TVB. Yueh was one of the most versatile and prolific leading actors of Shaw Brothers. Yueh starred in five to ten films per year in his heyday, playing roles ranging from foolish drunks to scholarly warriors. Yueh died of cancer in Vancouver, British Columbia, Canada, aged 76.

== Biography ==
Yueh was born as Leung Lok-wah in Shanghai, with Cantonese ancestry. Yueh emigrated to Hong Kong in 1962 after graduating from the Shanghai Conservatory of Music. He joined Shaw Brothers Studio and started his acting career in 1963.

Yueh's breakout role was in the 1966 film Come Drink with Me. He was mainly cast in lead roles and is credited with over 130 films. Yueh was best known for his role in Looking Back in Anger, one of TVB's popular shows. After his last appearance on screen in 1989, he moved to Canada in the 1990s, where he hosted programs for the Vancouver Chinese radio station CHMB.

Yueh returned to the entertainment industry in Hong Kong from 2006 to 2015.

== Filmography ==
=== Films ===
This is a partial list of films.

Year	Title	Role	Notes/Ref.
1964	The Dancing Millionairess	Dancer	
1965	The Lark		
1966	The Monkey Goes West		
1966	Princess Iron Fan		
1966	Come Drink with Me	Fan Dapei / Drunken Knight	
1967	Hong Kong Nocturne		
1967	The Sword and the Lute	Shen Shu-wen	
1967	Sweet is Revenge	Xiao Pao	
1969	Dragon Swamp	Xi Zhengyuan	
1970	Brothers Five	Valet Kao Wei	
1970	The Twelve Gold Medallions	Miao Lung	
1970	Lady of Steel	Qin Shang Yi	
1971	Vengeance of a Snow Girl	Tin Ying	
1971	The Long Chase	Kou Ying	
1973	Facets of Love	Emperor Zheng-De	
1973	The House of 72 Tenants	Fat Chai	
1973	Illicit Desire	Hsiao I	
1973	The Villains	Fang Zheng	
1974	Super Stooges vs. the Wonder Women	Chung	
1974	Virgins of the Seven Seas	Ko Pao	
1976	Killer Clans	Lu Hsiang Chuan	
1976	Love Swindlers		
1976	The Web of Death	Fei Ying-hsiung	
1977	Clans of Intrigue	Monk Hua	
1977	Death Duel	To Lang-chung	
1977	The Face Behind The Mask	Hsiao Meng-fei	
1977	Jade Tiger	Tang Ao	
1977	The Green Dragon Inn	Marshall Law, Bold Dragon	
1977	The Sentimental Swordsman	Long Xiaoyun	
1978	Legend of the Bat	Li Yuhan	
1978	Clan of Amazons	Hua Manlou	
1978	The Master and the Kid		
1978	Vengeful Beauty		
1979	Full Moon Scimitar	Master Xie Xiao Feng	
1979	Ninja Wolves	Yung Ti	
1980	A Deadly Secret	Ling Tui-see	
1980	Bruce Tuan's 7 Promises	Chow Sun	
1980	Heroes Shed No Tears	Hsiao Lei-hsueh	
1981	The Duel of the Century	Ximen Chuixue	
1981	Return of the Sentimental Swordsman	Guo Songyang	
1981	Black Lizard	Xiao Lik	
1981	Mahjong Heroes	Kwok Chu	
1982	The Spirit of the Sword	Tzu Yi-hou	
1983	99 Cycling Swords		
1995	Rumble in the Bronx	Wah	
2006	Confession of Pain	Chow Yuen Sing	
2008	Three Kingdoms: Resurrection of the Dragon	Liu Bei	

=== TV series ===
Year	Title	Role	Notes
1980	Gone with the Wind 浮生六劫	Ching Jui-cheung	
1980	Fatherland 大地恩情	Yeung Luk-kan	
1986	Sword of the Yue Maiden 越女劍	Fan Lai	
1987	The Legend of the Book and the Sword 書劍恩仇錄	Cheung Chiu-chung	
1987	The Seasons 季節		
1988	Two Most Honorable Knights 絕代雙驕	Yin Nam-tin	
1988	And Yet We Live 當代男兒		
1989	Looking Back in Anger 義不容情	Fung Sai-bong	
1989	Fu Kwai Lau Mang	Lam Cheung	
2006	Below the Lion Rock 獅子山下		
2007	The Brink of Law 突圍行動	Tung Chin-lung	Nominated – Best Supporting Actor
2007	The Slicing of the Demon 凶城計中計	Fok Tin-ming	
2008-2009	The Gem of Life 珠光寶氣	Hoh Fung (Martin)	Nominated – Best Supporting Actor (Top 5)
2009	Rosy Business 巾幗梟雄	Cheung Kiu	
2010	Ghost Writer 蒲松齡	Po Poon	
2010	No Regrets 巾幗梟雄之義海豪情	Cheng Long-gwan	
2011	A Great Way to Care 仁心解碼	Ko Sau-yee	
2011	Grace Under Fire 女拳	Tong Yue-han	Nominated – Best Supporting Actor
2011	Be Home for Dinner 誰家灶頭無煙火	Chung Kwok-chu	
2012	The Last Steep Ascent 天梯	Miu Hoi	Guest Appearance
2012	The Confidant 大太監	Chan Fuk	Nominated – Best Supporting Actor
2013	Slow Boat Home 情越海岸線	Cheung Shing-mui	
2013	Will Power 法外風雲	Lo Sam Bo	
2014	Outbound Love 單戀雙城	Law Wai	
2014	Gilded Chopsticks 食為奴	Kangxi Emperor	
2014	Storm in a Cocoon 守業者	Poon Wing-lin	
2014	Shades of Life 我們的天空	Cheung Kit	Episode 9
2014	All That Is Bitter Is Sweet 大藥坊	Hui Sung Ming	
2014	Overachievers 名門暗戰	Chiang Sing-Tin	
2015	Captain of Destiny 張保仔	Lai Gung-gung	

== Personal life ==
In 1975, Yueh married Tien Lie, an actress. On 20 October 2018, Yueh died in Vancouver, British Columbia, Canada at the age of 76.

== Additional sources ==
- Curti, Roberto (2016). Diabolika: Supercriminals, Superheroes and the Comic Book Universe in Italian Cinema. Midnight Marquee Press. ISBN 978-1-936168-60-6.
