= Power Chan =

- Born: 4 February 1968 (age 58); British Hong Kong
- Occupation: Actor
- Years active: 1989–present
- Spouse: Mimi Lo (2009–present)

Chinese name
- Traditional Chinese: 陳國邦
- Simplified Chinese: 陈国邦
Transcriptions
Standard Mandarin
- Hanyu Pinyin: Chén Guóbǎng
Yue: Cantonese
- Jyutping: can4 gwok3 bong1
- Musical career
- Also known as: Jerry Chan
- Origin: Hong Kong
- Website: kwokpong.net

Power Chan Kwok-pong is an actor in Hong Kong. He has appeared in numerous TVB drama series as well as films. He dated cantopop singer and actress Mimi Lo for 7 years before marrying her on December 2, 2009. He left TVB in October 2015.

== Filmography ==
=== Film ===
Year	Title	Role	Notes
1989	Thank You, Sir	Wong Wai Kit	Nominated - Golden Horse Awards for Best Supporting Actor
1990	The Set Up		
1991	The Banquet		
1991	Riki-Oh: The Story of Ricky	Sa	
1992	Fight Back to School II	SDU	
1993	Murders Made to Order	Po	
1993	Days of Tomorrow	Leung	
1994	In the Heat of Summer	Daddy	
1994	The Rapist	Inspector Lau Man Ching	
1994	Why Wild Girls	Hung	
1994	1941 Hong Kong on Fire		
1994	SDU Mission in Mission	Yat / Bond	
1994	To Live and Die in Tsimshatsui	Pong	
1994	Modern Romance	Bond	
1994	The Final Option	Bond	Nominated - Hong Kong Film Award for Best Supporting Actor
1994	STT Dorm		
1995	Gates of Hell		
1995	Spider Woman		
1995	Spike Drink Gang	Ho Siu Sun	
1995	Those Were the Days...	Ng Hark Ming / Safe Box	
1995	Lover of the Last Empress	On Tak Chuen	
1995	The Eternal Evil of Asia	Bon	
1995	Diary of a Serial Killer	Lau Shu Piu	
1995	Dream Killer	Lai Chi Hung	
1996	Thanks for Your Love		
1996	Boy's?	Joey	
1996	Devil's Woman	Baldhead's partner	
1997	Once Upon a Time in China and America	So Sai-man ("Bucktooth" So)	
1997	Ghost Story 'Godmother of Mongkok		
1998	The Lord of Hangzhou	Ma Kwong	
1999	The Doctor in Spite of Himself	Mr. Tee	
1999	Beach Girl		
1999	Nuclear Weapon		
1999	Stupid		
1999	Our Last Day		
1999	Two Faces	Car Salesman	
1999	Street Kids: The Underdog		
1999	Gambler Series: No Way Out		
1999	Four Chefs and a Feast		
2000	Diamond Hill	Cop	
2000	The Killer of the Lonely Heart	Lee Chun Fan	
2000	Love or Kill		
2001	The Rape	Tung Wai	
2001	Take 2 in Life	Mang Kok Pong	
2001	Crime of a Beast		
2001	Shades of Fire		
2001	Gun of Dragon		
2001	Gambler Series: Win, Win, Win		
2001	Legend of Double Tap		
2001	Speedy Gun Shooter		
2002	Distinctive		
2002	Animals		
2003	Foolish 23		
2004	Bad Man Come Back		
2008	L For Love L For Lies	Lee Ka Wai	
2009	Coweb		
2011	Flying Swords of Dragon Gate	Wind Blade	Cantonese voice
2013	7 Assassins	Yip	
2025	Back to the Past	Li Si	

=== TV series ===
Year	Title	Role	Notes
1989	The Justice of Life 《他來自江湖》		
1991	The Breaking Point 《今生無悔》	Cheung Chun Bo 張進寶	
1996	Wong Fei Hung Series	So Sai-man ("Bucktooth" So)	
1997	The Last Tango in Shanghai 《上海探戈》	Siu Huk 小黑	China Mainland Series
1999	Food Glorious Food 《食神》	趙逢春	ATV Series
1999	The Legendary Siblings 絕代雙驕	Black Spider	Taiwanese series
2000	Street Fighters 《廟街·媽·兄弟》	鄧國基	
2001	Hope for Sale 《街市的童話》	傻強	
2001	A Step into the Past 《尋秦記》	Li Si 李斯	
2002	A Herbalist Affair 《情牽百子櫃》	Choi Chi Wah 周志華	
2002	Golden Faith 《流金歲月》	Si Tou Kai 司徒佳	
2002	Lofty Waters Verdant Bow 《雲海玉弓緣》	Kong Nam 江南	
2003	The W Files 《衛斯理》	Chan Cheung Ching 陳長青	
2003	Find the Light 《英雄‧刀‧少年》	Do Lei Mo 多里摩	
2004	Lady Fan 《烽火奇遇結良緣》	Sit Ying Long 薛應龍	
2004	To Love with No Regrets 《足秤老婆八兩夫》	鄭先	
2004	The Last Breakthrough 《天涯俠醫》	Chung Chan Tin 鐘贊田	
2005	Lost in the Chamber of Love	Shuen Fei-fu	
2005	Wong Fei Hung – Master of Kung Fu	Dai Siu-tin	
2005	Life Made Simple		
2005	Into Thin Air	Man Kai-chiu	
2006	Lethal Weapons of Love and Passion	Fan Leung Gik	
2006	Bar Bender	Lei Kwong Tak	Nominated - TVB Anniversary Award for Best Supporting Actor (Top 20)
2006	Au Revoir Shanghai	Sam Koo Hok Ji	
2006	The Conquest	Wen Zhong	Nominated - TVB Anniversary Award for Best Supporting Actor (Top 20); TVB and ZJSTV collaboration
2007	The Drive of Life	Wang Siu-Leung	
2007	Marriage of Inconvenience	Lam Pak-Sam	
2007	The Building Blocks of Life	Yeung Chi-Hin	
2007-2008	Survivor's Law II	Sun Man Gum	
2008	The Master of Tai Chi	Ma Keong	
2008	Love Exchange	Tsui Yuet Yu	
2008	D.I.E.	truck driver	cameo ep. 25
2009	The Threshold of a Persona	Leung Chi-lun	
2009	You're Hired	Lam Mok-sum	
2010	Suspects in Love	Cheung Sz-Chai	
2010	OL Supreme	Man Cho-san (Vincent)	cameo ep. 35-37
2010	Beauty Knows No Pain	Chi Nam	
2010	Growing Through Life	Chow Cheuk-wai (Wilson)	
2010	Twilight Investigation	Ho Ying-biu	
2011	A Great Way to Care	Cheung Chi Dong	
2011	Grace Under Fire	Wong Hon-pong	
2011	The Life and Times of a Sentinel	Hong-hei Emperor	
2011	Men with No Shadows	Vincent Tong	Nominated — TVB Anniversary Award for Best Supporting Actor (Top 15)
2011	ICAC Investigators 2011		
2012	Gloves Come Off	Chu Sai-cheung	
2012	The Confidant	Pang Sam-shun	Nominated — TVB Anniversary Award for Best Supporting Actor (Final 2)
2012	Missing You		
2013	A Great Way to Care II	Sunny Ho	
2013	Triumph in the Skies II	Paul	
2013	Will Power	Sung Kar-cheung	
2014	Gilded Chopsticks	Yunreng	
2014	Ghost Dragon of Cold Mountain	Ma Chuen-kong	
2014	Overachievers	Lee Chau-kan	
2015	Elite Brigade III		
2016	Short End of the Stick	Dan Tin	
2017	Come Home Love: Dinner at 8	Lam Yi-mak (林以默)	
