= Maggie Shiu =

Hong Kong actress

- 邵美琪
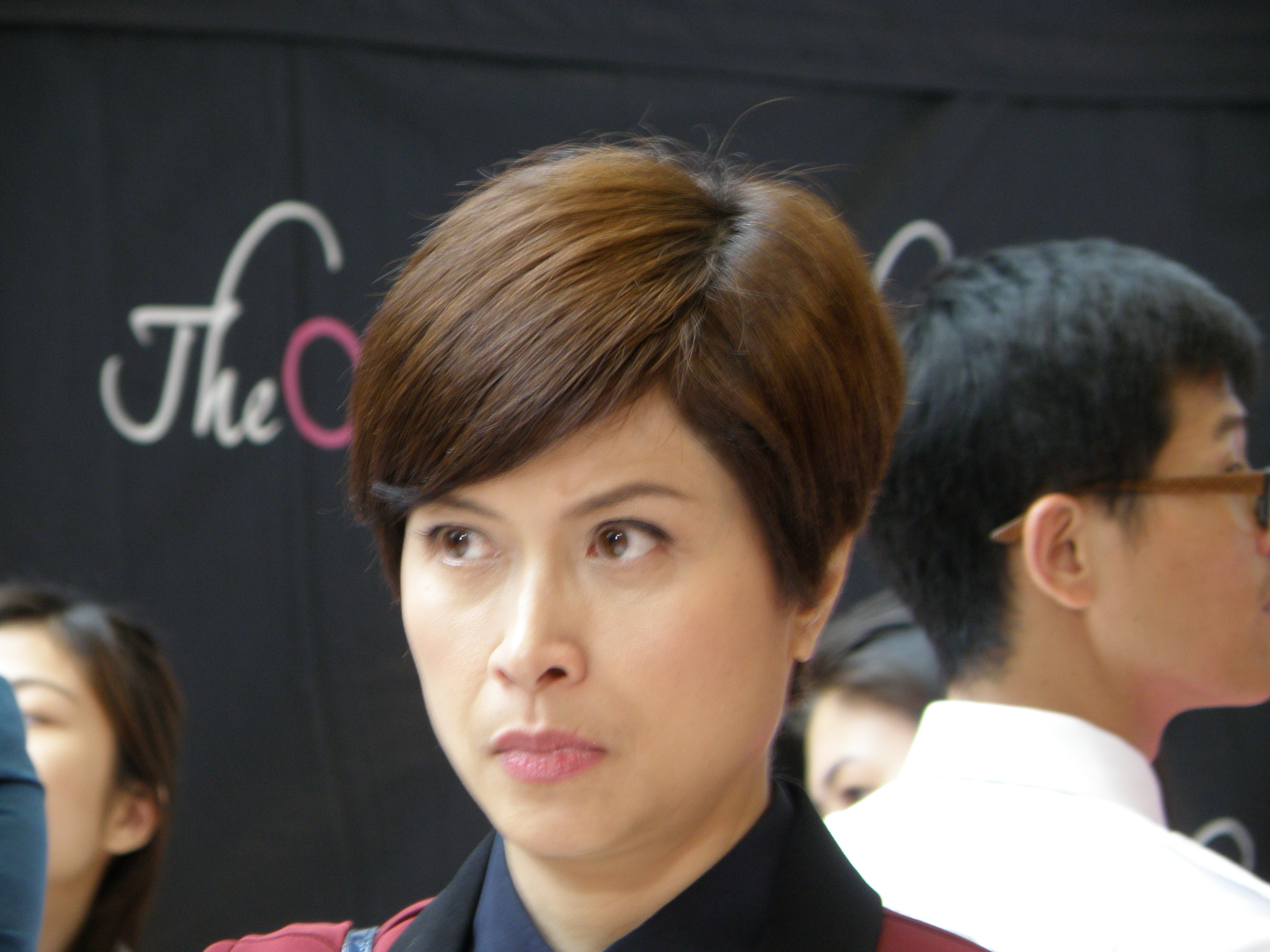
- Shiu in 2018
- Born: 27 February 1965 (age 61); British Hong Kong
- Occupation: Actress
- Years active: 1985–present

Chinese name
- Traditional Chinese: 邵美琪
- Simplified Chinese: 邵美琪
Transcriptions
Standard Mandarin
- Hanyu Pinyin: Shào Měiqí
Yue: Cantonese
- Jyutping: siu6 mei5 kei4

Maggie Shiu (born 27 February 1965) is a Hong Kong actress known for her extensive work in television, film, and international productions. A veteran of TVB, she has appeared in numerous acclaimed series and films.

== Life and career ==
=== 1965–1984: Early days and training ===
Maggie was born in February 27 1965 in Hong Kong. There are no further information about her earlier days until her entry into the entertainment industry. She entered the entertainment industry by joining the TVB Artist Training Program in 1984 and began her acting career in 1985.

=== 1985–2009:TVB era and film career ===
After training for a year, Maggie began appearing TVB dramas in 1985. Her early work included appearances in music videos for Jacky Cheung (“輕撫你的臉”, “情已逝”) and George Lam (“愛到發燒”, “十分十二吋”), as well as early television roles such as Class of 4D (1985), Take Care, Your Highness! (1985), and Happy Spirit (1985).

She gained recognition in TVB dramas including New Heavenly Sword and Dragon Sabre (1986), Blood of Good and Evil (1990), The Breaking Point (1991), Conscience (1994), and Healing Hands II (2001). During her TVB tenure, Shiu was in a long-term relationship with actor Ekin Cheng in the late 1990s, which was noted in entertainment media.

Her film work includes Unfaithfully Yours (1989), Ghost for Sale (1991), and 92 Legendary La Rose Noire (1992). She won the Golden Bauhinia Awards for Best Supporting Actress for her role in PTU (2003) and was nominated for Best Supporting Actress at the Hong Kong Film Awards for Breaking News (2004), Election (2005), and Eye in the Sky (2007). She also received a Golden Horse Awards nomination for Best Supporting Actress for Eye in the Sky in 2007.

=== 2010–present: Leaving TVB and mainland projects ===
After 25 years with TVB, Shiu left the station in 2010 to pursue work in Mainland China and international projects.

She has since appeared in Mainland China dramas such as Palace (2011), Happy General (2012), and The Confidant (2012). In 2024, Shiu returned to TVB to work on the drama Undercover Girl alongside Eddie Kwan.

Outside her main screen work, she has also participated in stage productions and radio dramas over her career.

== Filmography ==
=== Film ===
Year	Title	Role	Notes
1989	Unfaithfully Yours		
1991	Ghost for Sale	小雨 Rain Siu Yi	
1992	92 Legendary La Rose Noire	黃蝴蝶 Butterfly Wong	
2003	PTU	Sgt. Kat	Golden Bauhinia Awards – Best Supporting Actress
2004	Breaking News	Grace Chow Wai Yee	Nominated – Hong Kong Film Awards Best Supporting Actress
2005	Election	Mrs. Big D	Nominated – Hong Kong Film Awards Best Supporting Actress
2007	Eye in the Sky	Inspector Cheung	Nominated – Hong Kong Film Awards & Golden Horse Awards
2009	A Very Short Life		
2011	Ghost Buddies	Pearl	
2015	Port of Call	Madam Law	
2017	Between Love & Desire	Rebecca Tsang Bo-lam	
2022	A Murder Erased	Inspector Cheung Ka Yan	
2025	My Best Bet	Madam	

=== Television series ===
Year	Title	Role	Notes
1985	Class of 4D		TVB
1985	Take Care, Your Highness!	Princess Fragrant	TVB
1986	New Heavenly Sword and Dragon Sabre	Siu Ciu	TVB
1998	Web of Love	Lead role	TVB
2001	Healing Hands II	Anson Man	TVB
2005	Healing Hands III	Anson Man	TVB
2006	C.I.B. Files	Shek Giu	TVB
2008–2009	The Gem of Life	Sylvia Hong	TVB
2009–2010	A Watchdog's Tale		TVB
2011	Palace	Concubine Liang / Empress Xiaochengren	Mainland China
2012	Happy General	Princess of South Sea	Mainland China
2012	The Confidant	Empress Dowager Ci’an	Mainland China
2014	Storm in a Cocoon	Madam Yu	Mainland China
2015	Captain of Destiny	Shek Giu	Mainland China
2016	My Ages Apart	Bau Mei Na	Mainland China
2017	Between Love & Desire	Rebecca	Mainland China
2018	Siege in Fog	Zhun Xiu	Mainland China
2024	Undercover Girl	Supporting role	TVB

=== TV films and specials ===
- Call Me Scoundrel (1992)
- Dead End (1992)
- RTHK productions: A World Without Wall (2010), Equal Opportunities (2013)

=== Music video appearances ===
- Jacky Cheung – "輕撫你的臉", "情已逝" (1985)
- George Lam – "愛到發燒", "十分十二吋" (1985)

== Awards and nominations ==
Year	Award	Work	Result
2003	Golden Bauhinia Awards – Best Supporting Actress	PTU	Won
2004	Hong Kong Film Awards – Best Supporting Actress	Breaking News	Nominated
2005	Hong Kong Film Awards – Best Supporting Actress	Election	Nominated
2007	Hong Kong Film Awards – Best Supporting Actress	Eye in the Sky	Nominated
2007	Golden Horse Awards – Best Supporting Actress	Eye in the Sky	Nominated
