= List of TVB series (1989) =

This is a list of series released by or aired on TVB Jade Channel in 1989.

== First line-up ==
These dramas air in Hong Kong from 7:35pm to 8:35 pm, Monday to Friday on Jade.

| Airing date | English title (Chinese title) | Number of episodes | Main cast | Theme song (T) Sub-theme song (ST) | Genre | Notes | Official website |
|---|---|---|---|---|---|---|---|
| 30 Jan- 24 Feb | The Legend of Master Chan 吉星報喜 | 20 | Deric Wan, Kathy Chow, Margie Tsang, Hugo Ng | T: "吉星高照" (Deric Wan) | Costume drama | Copyright notice: 1988. | Official website |
| 27 Feb- 24 Mar | The Vixen's Tale 萬家傳說 | 20 | Roger Kwok, Yammie Nam, Sheren Tang, Cutie Mui | T: "緣" (Prudence Liew) | Costume drama | | |
| 27 Mar- 31 Mar | I Do I Do 花月佳期 | 5 | Roger Kwok, Michele Reis, Francis Ng | | Modern drama | | |
| 3 Apr- 9 Jun | Looking Back in Anger 義不容情 | 50 | Felix Wong, Carina Lau, Kathy Chow, Deric Wan, Maggie Siu, Kiki Sheung, Canti Lau | T: "一生何求" (Danny Chan); ST: "幾分傷心幾分癡" (Dave Wong) | Modern drama | | Official website |
| 12 Jun- 7 Jul | A Trial of Lifetime 相愛又如何 | 20 | Hugo Ng, Cally Kwong, David Siu, Gallen Lo | T: "未了情" (Cally Kwong) | Modern drama | | Official website |
| 10 Jul- 21 Jul | Two of a Kind 淘氣雙子星 | 10 | Hacken Lee, Paul Wong, Cutie Mui, Steve Wong, Aaron Kwok | T: "逝去日子" (Beyond) | Modern drama | | Official website |
| 24 Jul- 18 Aug | For Once in a Lifetime 富貴流氓 | 20 | Money Chan, Francis Ng, Margie Tsang | T: "留下了心事" (Cally Kwong) | Modern drama | | |
| 21 Aug- 22 Sep | Battle of the Heart 摘星的女人 | 25 | Felix Wong, Bill Chan, Yammie Nam, Betty Mak, Kiki Sheung | T: "心聲" (Cally Kwong) | Modern drama | Released overseas on 5 December 1988. Copyright notice: 1988. | |
| 25 Sep- 20 Oct | Three in a Crowd 串燒冤家 | 20 | David Siu, Money Chan, Liu Wai Hung, Fiona Leung, Ng Man-tat | T: "夏日戀人" (Anita Mui) | Modern drama | | Official website |
| 23 Oct- 17 Nov | Family Fortune 家山有福 | 20 | Eddie Kwan, Jimmy Wong, Wing Lam, Benz Hui, | T: "家山有福" (Anita Mui) | Pre-modern drama | | Official website |
| 20 Nov- 24 Nov | Fate in Our Hands 香港雲起時 | 5 | Carina Lau, Francis Ng | T: "無悔這一生" (Beyond) | Modern drama | | Official website |
| 27 Nov- 22 Dec | Yanky Boy 回到唐山 | 20 | Leon Lai, Ha Yu, Kitty Lai, Gallen Lo, Eugina Lau | T: "恕未從俗" (Leon Lai) | Period drama | | Official website |
| 25 Dec- 19 Jan 1990 | Song Bird 天涯歌女 | 20 | Nadia Chan, Leon Lai, Eddie Kwan | T: "天涯歌女" (Nadia Chan) | Period drama | | Official website |

== Second line-up ==
These dramas air in Hong Kong from 8:35 pm to 9:05 pm, Monday to Friday on Jade.

| Airing date | English title (Chinese title) | Number of episodes | Main cast | Theme song (T) Sub-theme song (ST) | Genre | Notes | Official website |
|---|---|---|---|---|---|---|---|
| 5 Dec 1988- 31 Mar | Man on the House 小小大丈夫 | 49 | Jimmy Wong, Wing Lam, Anthony Wong | | Modern sitcom | Copyright notice: 1988 (Eps. 1-12), 1989 (Eps. 13-49). | |
| 3 Apr- 8 Jul | I Love Amy 我愛俏冤家 | 50 | Liu Kai Ji, Rebecca Chan, Dicky Cheung, Elvina Kong | T: "絕浪" (Kenny Bee) | Modern sitcom | | |
| 10 Jul- 18 Nov | Everybody Loves Somebody 公私三文治 | 76 | Margie Tsang, Francis Ng, Cutie Mui, Anita Lee, Eddie Cheung, Eddie Kwan | | Modern sitcom | | |
| 20 Nov- 2 Mar 1990 | My Son-In-Law 婆．媽．女婿 | 58 | Dicky Cheung, Sean Lau, Lily Poon, Jacqueline Law, Wayne Lai | | Modern sitcom | | |

== Third line-up ==
These dramas air in Hong Kong from 9:25pm to 10:25pm, Monday to Friday on Jade.

| Airing date | English title (Chinese title) | Number of episodes | Main cast | Theme song (T) Sub-theme song (ST) | Genre | Notes | Official website |
|---|---|---|---|---|---|---|---|
| 9 Jan- 3 Feb | The Shanghai Conspiracy 上海大風暴 | 20 | Wilson Lam, Carina Lau, Sean Lau, Francis Ng | T: "愛的風暴" (Andy Hui) | Pre-modern drama | Copyright notice: 1987. | Official website |
| 6 Feb- 3 Mar | The Reincarnated of Wai 摩登小寶 | 19 | Eddie Cheung, Simon Yam, Mimi Kung, Elizabeth Lee | T: "假我真心" (Christopher Wong) | Modern drama | Copyright notice: 1988 (Eps. 2-19), 1989 (Ep. 1). | Official website |
| 6 Mar- 31 Mar | The Sword and the Sabre 決戰皇城 | 20 | Adam Cheng, Bryan Leung, Sheren Tang, Shalline Tse | T: "揮出一片心" (Adam Cheng) | Costume drama | Released overseas on 9 December 1988. Copyright notice: 1988. | Official website |
| 3 Apr- 12 May | Final Combat 蓋世豪俠 | 30 | Stephen Chow, Yammie Nam, Francis Ng, Ng Man Tat, Jacqueline Law, Cutie Mui | T: "無名小卒" (David Lui) | Costume action | | |
| 15 May- 26 May | The Vampire Strikes Again 末代天師 | 10 | Anita Lee, Alex To, Andy Hui, Nathan Chan | T: "末代天師" (Alex To) | Period drama | Released overseas on 8 March 1989. Copyright notice: 1988. | Official website |
| 29 May- 9 Jun | Greed 人海虎鯊 | 20 | Felix Wong, Eddy Ko, Pauline Yeung, Eddie Kwan, Anita Lee | T: "人海虎鯊" (Michael Kwan) | Modern drama | Released overseas on 21 March 1989. Copyright notice: 1988. | Official website |
| 12 Jun- 7 Jul | Lin Shing Kuet 連城訣 | 20 | Roger Kwok, Kitty Lai, Francis Ng, Shallin Tse, Maggie Chan | T: "珍惜這一刻" (David Lui & Sammi Cheng); ST: "菊花淚" (David Lui & Sammi Cheng) | Costume drama | Released overseas on 15 January 1989. Copyright notice: 1988. | |
| 10 Jul- 4 Aug | The Joy of Being Simple 大城小警 | 20 | Ha Yu, Gary Chan, Kitty Lai, Maggie Chan | T: "沉默風暴" (Tai Chi) | Modern drama | | Official website |
| 7 Aug- 25 Aug | Fei Fu Kwan Ying 飛虎群英 | 15 | Donnie Yen, Pauline Yeung, Eddie Kwan, Anita Lee, Mimi Kung | T: "深淵" (Alex To) | Modern drama | Overseas version 20 episodes Released overseas on 31 March 1989. | Official website |
| 28 Aug- 1 Sep | Crooks Don't Win 千外有千 | 5 | Candice Yu, Deric Wan, Kenneth Tsang, Lily Leung | T: "別再靠緊我" (Sandy Lam) | Period drama | | Official website |
| 4 Sep- 13 Oct | The War Heroes 天變 | 30 | Roger Kwok, Sheren Tang, Kitty Lai, Jimmy Au, Shalline Tse, Anthony Wong, Kenneth Tsang | T: "通緝者" (Tai Chi) | Costume drama | | Official website |
| 16 Oct- 10 Nov | War of the Dragon 還我本色 | 20 | Simon Yam, Deric Wan, Yammie Nam, Bryan Leung, Mimi Kung | T: "誰明浪子心" (Dave Wong) | Modern drama | | Official website |
| 13 Nov- 22 Dec | The Justice of Life 他來自江湖 | 30 | Alex Man, Stephen Chow, Teresa Mo, Kelly Niu, Ng Man Tat, Anthony Wong | T: "明天仍要繼續" (Alan Tam) | Modern drama | | Official website |
| 25 Dec- 19 Jan 1990 | Hap Hak Hang 俠客行 | 20 | Tony Leung, Sheren Tang | T: "俠客無憾" (David Lui) | Costume drama | Released overseas on 24 July 1989. | Official website |

== Other series ==
| Airing date | English title (Chinese title) | Number of episodes | Main cast | Theme song (T) Sub-theme song (ST) | Genre | Notes | Official website |
|---|---|---|---|---|---|---|---|
| 1 May- 26 May | Mo Min Kap Sin Fung 無冕急先鋒 | 20 | Donnie Yen, Kitty Lai, David Siu, Francis Ng | T: "無冕急先鋒" (Alex To) | Modern drama | Released overseas on 19 September 1988. Copyright notice: 1988. | |

== Warehoused series ==
These dramas were released overseas and have not broadcast on TVB Jade Channel.

| Oversea released date | English title (Chinese title) | Number of episodes | Main cast | Theme song (T) Sub-theme song (ST) | Genre | Notes | Official website |
|---|---|---|---|---|---|---|---|
| 15 May- 9 Jun | The Sect of Blood and Iron 鐵血大旗門 | 21 | Bill Chan, Sean Lau, Nathan Chan, Betty Mak | T: "滅旗恨" (David Lui) | Costume drama | Copyright notice: 1988 (Eps. 1-11 & 14-21), 1989 (Eps. 12-13). | |
| 7 Aug- 1 Sep | Chun Man Kung Chuen Ki 晉文公傳奇 | 20 | Leon Lai, Jacqueline Law | T: "飛渡煙雨間" (Leon Lai) | Costume drama | | |
| 18 Sep- 13 Oct | Lung Ting Tsang Pa 龍廷爭霸 | 20 | Gallen Lo, Margie Tsang, Eddie Cheung, Nathan Chan | T: "土木堡風雲" (Andy Hui) | Costume drama | | |
| 27 Nov- 22 Dec | The Lost Treasure 天機 | 20 | Nathan Chan | T: "像甚麼" (Frances Yip) | Period drama | | |
