= List of TVB series (1990) =

This is a list of series released by or aired on TVB Jade Channel in 1990.

== First line series ==
These dramas aired in Hong Kong from 7:25pm to 8:25pm, Monday to Friday on TVB.

Airing date	English title (Chinese title)	Number of episodes	Main cast	Theme song (T) Sub-theme song (ST)	Genre	Notes	Official website
22 Jan- 16 Feb	Triangular Entanglement 愛情三角錯	20	Deric Wan, Francis Ng, Maggie Siu, Teresa Mo	T: "最愛是我家" (Sally Yeh)	Modern drama	Released overseas on January 2, 1990. Copyright notice: 1989.	
19 Feb- 13 Apr	Rain in the Heart 成功路上	40	Roger Kwok, Dominic Lam, Gallen Lo, Kathy Chow, Winnie Lau, Josephine Lam	T: "成敗之間" (George Lam)	Modern drama	Copyright notice: 1989 (Eps. 1, 3-4, 9, 11-12, 21-22, & 24-28), 1990 (Eps. 2, 5-8, 10, 13-20, 23, & 29-40).	Official website
16 Apr- 11 May	Let It Be Me 亞二一族	20	Ha Yu, Rebecca Chan, Angelina Lo, Jimmy Wong, Ekin Cheng	T: "阿二的歌" (Lowell Lo)	Modern drama		
14 May- 6 July	Blood of Good and Evil 我本善良	40	Deric Wan, Maggie Siu, Kitty Lai, Kenneth Tsang, Nathan Chan, Law Lok Lam	T: "笑看風雲變" (Andy Hui & Anita Mui)	Modern drama		Official website
9 July- 27 July	It Runs in the Family 孖仔孖心肝	15	Sean Lau, Stephen Chow, Bryan Leung, Amy Chan	T: "暴雨驕陽" (Kenny Bee)	Modern drama		
30 Jul- 17 Aug	Songs for the Young 戀愛快拍	15	Christopher Wong	T: "戀愛快拍" (Christopher Wong)	Modern drama		
20 Aug- 14 Sep	The Self Within 失職丈夫	20	Eddie Cheung, Gallen Lo, Lily Chung, Ng Man Tat, Maggie Chan, Kiki Sheung	T: "藍焰" (Gallen Lo)	Modern drama		
17 Sep- 28 Sep	Priceless Adventure 香港蛙人	10	Ha Yu, Louise Lee, Elvina Kong, Dominic Lam	T: "同舟共濟" (Samuel Hui); ST: "話知你九七" (Samuel Hui)	Modern drama		Official website
1 Oct- 26 Oct	Friends and Lovers 又是冤家又聚頭	20	Sheren Tang, Teresa Mo, Francis Ng, Waise Lee, William So	T: "我走我路" (Sally Yeh)	Modern drama		Official website
29 Oct- 7 Dec	Where I Belong 笑傲在明天	30	Alex Man, Francis Ng, Kathy Chow, Cutie Mui, Eddie Cheung, Josephine Lam	T: "誰來主宰" (Beyond)	Modern drama		Official website
10 Dec- 18 Jan 1991	Challenge of Life 人在邊緣	30	Leon Lai, Sean Lau, Frankie Lam, Jacqueline Law, Monica Chan, Kitty Lai	T: "人在邊緣" (Leon Lai)	Modern drama		Official website

== Second line series ==
These dramas aired in Hong Kong from 8:45pm to 9:15pm, Monday to Friday on TVB.

Airing date	English title (Chinese title)	Number of episodes	Main cast	Theme song (T) Sub-theme song (ST)	Genre	Notes	Official website
20 Nov- 2 Mar 1990	My Son-In-Law 婆．媽．女婿	58	Dicky Cheung, Sean Lau, Lily Poon, Jacqueline Law, Wayne Lai		Modern sitcom		
3 Mar- 6 Jul	Three in a Family 茶煲世家	56	Louise Lee, Liu Wai Hung, Teresa Mo, Michael Tao, Wayne Lai, Joanna Chan		Modern sitcom		
9 Jul 1990- 29 Mar 1991	When the Sun Shines 同居三人組	150	Roger Kwok, Isabel Leung, Hacken Lee, Joseph Lee, Li Ka Sing, Kiki Sheung, Betsy Cheung	T: "迷離境界" (Hacken Lee)	Modern sitcom		

== Third line series ==
These dramas aired in Hong Kong from 9:15pm to 10:15pm, Monday to Friday on TVB.

Airing date	English title (Chinese title)	Number of episodes	Main cast	Theme song (T) Sub-theme song (ST)	Genre	Notes	Official website
22 Jan- 2 Feb	Being Rich 富貴超人	10	Roger Kwok, Margie Tsang, Liu Wai Hung, Chan On Ying, Johnny Ngan	T: "富貴超人" (Eddie Ng)	Modern comedy	Copyright notice: 1989 (Eps. 1 & 9-10), 1990 (Eps. 2-8).	
5 Feb- 2 Mar	In the Realms of Joy 天上凡間	20	Fiona Leung, Canti Lau, Frankie Lam	T: "一切是創造" (Shirley Kwan & Hacken Lee)	Ancient drama	Copyright notice: 1989.	
5 Mar- 30 Mar	The Enforcer's Experience 優皮幹探	20	David Siu, Eddie Cheung, Frankie Lam, Sheren Tang	T: "天知地知" (Eddie Ng)	Modern drama		Official website
2 Apr- 27 Apr	Kim Mo Tuk Ku Kau Pai 劍魔獨孤求敗	20	Felix Wong, Maggie Siu, Hugo Ng, Candy Cheung, Gordon Liu	T: "獨孤求敗" (Roman Tam, Lam Chor Kei, & Tong Mei Kwan)	Ancient action	Released overseas on January 2, 1990. Copyright notice: 1989.	Official website
30 Apr- 25 May	Cherished Moments 回到未嫁時	20	Leon Lai, Kathy Chow, Lau Siu Ming, Dominic Lam	T: "愛恨纏綿" (Shirley Kwan)	Modern drama		Official website
28 May- 22 Jun	The Gods and Demons of Zu Mountain 蜀山奇俠	20	Eddie Kwan, Aaron Kwok, Pauline Yeung, Mimi Kung, Anita Lee, Jimmy Au	T: "年少無情" (Jacky Cheung & Shirley Kwan)	Ancient action	Indirect prequel to 1991's The Zu Mountain Saga. Copyright notice: 1989.	
25 Jun- 20 Jul	When Things Get Tough 午夜太陽	20	Anthony Wong, Kitty Lai, Francis Ng, Aaron Kwok	T: "變色感情" (Paula Tsui)	Modern drama		Official website
23 July- 17 Aug	A Time of Taste 燃燒歲月	20	Sean Lau, David Siu, Maggie Siu, Jacqueline Law, Mimi Kung	T: "天意人心" (Choi Kwok Kuen)	Period drama		
20 Aug- 14 Sep	A World Apart 水鄉危情	10	Teresa Mo, Waise Lee, Sean Lau	T: "為何要分離" (Dave Wong)	Modern drama	Released overseas on February 15, 1990. Copyright notice: 1989.	
03 Sep- 5 Oct	The Cop Story 零點出擊	25	Deric Wan, Pauline Yeung, Shalline Tse, Li Ka Sing	T: "無法再傷多半次" (Cally Kwong) ST:' "軟軟的心" (Cally Kwong)	Modern drama		Official website
8 Oct- 2 Nov	The Legend of the Dragon Pearl 走路新郎哥	20	Deric Wan, Michael Tao, Barbara Chan, Eugina Lau, Winnie Lau	T: "男子志高遠" (Deric Wan)	Period drama		
5 Nov- 30 Nov	The Hunter’s Prey 烏金血劍	20	Canti Lau, Gallen Lo, Vivian Chow, Eddie Cheung, Wing Lam	T: "天從人願" (Andy Lau)	Ancient drama		
3 Dec- 14 Dec	Silken Hands 自梳女	10	Amy Chan, Poon Fong Fong, Maggie Siu, Gallen Lo, Andy Hui		Period drama		
17 Dec- 11 Jan 1991	The Serpentine Romance 奇幻人間世	20	Maggie Siu, Maggie Chan, Hugo Ng	T: "秋意中等我" (Andy Lau & May Ng)	Ancient drama		

== Other series ==
Airing date	English title (Chinese title)	Number of episodes	Main cast	Theme song (T) Sub-theme song (ST)	Genre	Notes	Official website
24 Dec- 18 Jan 1991	The Witness of Time 天若有情	20	Hugo Ng, Anthony Wong, Ekin Cheng, Barbara Chan, Eugina Lau	T: "人在風雨中" (Dave Wong)	Modern drama	Released overseas on March 5, 1990.	

== Warehoused series ==
These dramas were released overseas and have not broadcast on TVB Jade Channel.

Oversea released date	English title (Chinese title)	Number of episodes	Main cast	Theme song (T) Sub-theme song (ST)	Genre	Notes	Official website
5 Feb- 2 Mar	Ngo Kim Chun Chau 傲劍春秋	20	David Siu, Lily Chung	T: "傲劍春秋" (Patrick Tam & Tong Mei Kwan)	Costume drama	Copyright notice: 1989 (Eps. 1–5, 11–14, & 16–18), 1990 (Eps. 6–10, 15, & 19–20).	
16 Jul- 10 Aug	The Blood Hounds 大唐名捕	20	Francis Ng, Andy Tai, Fiona Leung, Josephine Lam	T: "天涯共此時" (Andy Hui & Tong Mei Kwan)	Costume drama		
6 Aug- 31 Aug	The Jade Fox 玉面飛狐	20	Hugo Ng, Anita Lee, Jacqueline Law, Jimmy Au	T: "情真情假" (Tong Mei Kwan)	Costume drama		
3 Sep- 28 Sep	An Elite Choice 飛越官場	20	Canti Lau, Maggie Siu, Eddie Cheung, Shalline Tse	T: "情緣" (Cally Kwong)	Costume drama		
5 Nov- 30 Nov	The Glittering Fortune 歡樂山城	20	Dicky Cheung, Margie Tsang, Nathan Chan, Carol Yeung	T: "小風波" (Prudence Liew)	Period drama		
