= List of TVB series (1988) =

This is a list of series released by or aired on TVB Jade Channel in 1988.

== First line series ==
These dramas aired in Hong Kong from 7:10pm to 8:10pm, Monday to Friday on TVB.

Airing date	English title (Chinese title)	Number of episodes	Main cast	Theme song (T) Sub-theme song (ST)	Genre	Notes	Official website
18 Jan- 12 Feb	The Rise of a Kung Fu Master 南拳蔡李佛	20	Meng Fei, Cecilia Wong, Eddie Ko, Kitty Lai, Tai Chi Wai	T: "碧血忠魂" (David Lui)	Costume drama	Released overseas on June 1, 1987. Copyright notice: 1986.	
15 Feb- 4 Mar	The New Matchmaker 奉旨成親	15	Liu Wai Hung, Wing Lam, Fiona Leung	T: "鴛鴦譜" (Priscilla Chan)	Period drama		
7 Mar- 8 Apr	The In-between 旭日背後	25	Nathan Chan, Anita Lee, Ha Yu, Sheren Tang, Maggie Siu	T: "旭日背後" (Joe Cheng)	Modern drama		
11 Apr- 15 Apr	Sunrise in Forbidden City 日落紫禁城	5	Lau Kong		Costume drama		
18 Apr- 13 May	A Friend in Need 飛躍霓裳	20	Simon Yam, Jacqueline Law, Jamie Chik, Leon Lai, Fiona Leung	T: "你愛的一個無名氏" (Deric Wan)	Modern drama		
16 May- 3 Jun	Evanescent Bliss 留住明天	15	Patrick Tse, Nathan Chan, Mimi Kung	T: "黃昏的聲音" (Alan Tam)	Modern drama		
6 Jun- 1 Jul	Four of a Kind 老子萬歲	20	Wing Lam, Lawrence Ng, Dicky Cheung, Shalline Tse, Fiona Leung	T: "愛是種魔力" (Deric Wan)	Costume drama		
4 Jul- 29 Jul	My Father's Son 鬥氣一族	20	Ha Yu, Stephen Chow, Angelina Lo, Sandra Ng, Dickson Lee	T: "同根生" (From The Same Root); Alan Tam	Modern drama		Official website
1 Aug- 19 Aug	Summer of 1988 不再少年時	15	Hacken Lee, William So	T: "不再少年時" (Hacken Lee)	Modern drama		
22 Aug- 16 Sep	Games People Play 檸檬丈夫	20	Carina Lau, Liu Wai Hung, Deric Wan, Kitty Lai	T: "為何是我" (Thomas Chan)	Modern drama		
3 Oct- 25 Nov	The Saga of the Lost Kingdom 嬴單傳奇	35	Roger Kwok, Kathy Chow, Margie Tsang, Eddie Cheung, Dicky Cheung, Hugo Ng, Mimi Kung, Jacqueline Law	T: "難得糊塗" (Anita Mui)	Costume drama		
28 Nov- 27 Jan 1989	Twilight of a Nation 太平天國	45	Ray Lui, Felix Wong, Sheren Tang, Kiki Sheung, Sean Lau, Money Chan, Teresa Mo, Jimmy Au, Aaron Kwok	T: "天下一家" (Roman Tam) ST: "誰的錯"; Gina Lam (林楚麒)	Costume drama		

== Second line series ==
These dramas aired in Hong Kong from 8:10pm to 8:40pm, Monday to Friday on TVB.

Airing date	English title (Chinese title)	Number of episodes	Main cast	Theme song (T) Sub-theme song (ST)	Genre	Notes	Official website
14 Jul 1986- 8 Apr	City Story 城市故事	443	Deric Wan, Gallen Lo		Modern sitcom		
11 Apr- 2 Dec	Everybody's Somebody's 都市方程式	152	Aaron Kwok, Wu Fung, Fiona Leung		Modern sitcom		
5 Dec- 31 Mar 1989	Man On The House 小小大丈夫	49	Jimmy Wong, Wing Lam, Anthony Wong		Modern sitcom		

== Third line series ==
These dramas aired in Hong Kong from 8:50pm to 9:50pm, Monday to Friday on TVB.

Airing date	English title (Chinese title)	Number of episodes	Main cast	Theme song (T) Sub-theme song (ST)	Genre	Notes	Official website
25 Jan- 1 Mar	Withered in the Wind 名門	27	Eddie Cheung, Wilson Lam, Kitty Lai, Shalline Tse, Dicky Cheung, Teresa Mo	T: "未了緣" (David Lui)	Period drama	Copyright notice: 1987.	
2 Mar- 8 Apr	The Final Verdict 誓不低頭	28	Adam Cheng, Kenneth Tsang, Rebecca Chan, Roger Kwok, Eugina Lau, Gallen Lo	T: "誓不低頭" (Adam Cheng)	Modern drama	Released overseas on February 29, 1988. Copyright notice: 1987.	Official website
11 Apr- 15 Apr	Behind Silk Curtains 大都會	5	Adam Cheng, Liza Wang, Jamie Chik, Tony Leung, Stephen Chow, Ray Lui, Wing Lam		Modern drama		official website
18 Apr- 13 May	Flame of Fury 無名火	20	Bill Chan, Kathy Chow, Jacqueline Law	T: "無名火" (Alex To)	Modern drama	Released overseas on April 17, 1988.	
16 May- 10 Jun	Fate Cast in the Wind 大茶園	20	Teresa Mo, Lawrence Ng, Wong Wan Choi	T: "我不再否認" (Jenny Tseng)	Period drama		
13 Jun- 8 Jul	Chu Doi Sheung Kiu 絕代雙驕	20	Tony Leung, Kitty Lai, Hugo Ng, Michael Miu, Shallin Tse, Jamie Chik	T: "願你知我心" (Tony Leung)	Costume drama		
11 Jul- 5 Aug	Friends and Enemies 衰鬼迫人	20	James Yi, Teresa Mo, Deric Wan, Lo Hoi Pang, Eugina Lau	T: "令你著迷" (Danny Chan)	Modern drama		
8 Aug- 28 Oct	And Yet We Live 當代男兒	60	Alex Man, Ray Lui, Money Chan, Wing Lam, Betty Mak, Sean Lau, Maggie Chan, Dominic Lam, Dicky Cheung	T: "真的漢子" (George Lam)	Modern drama		Official website
31 Oct- 25 Nov	The Tribulation of Life 阿德也瘋狂	20	Stephen Chow, David Siu, Jacqueline Law, Maggie Siu	T: "又見朝陽" (Sandy Lam)	Modern drama		
28 Nov- 23 Dec	The Undercover Story 狙擊神探	20	Simon Yam, Eddie Cheung, Chingmy Yau, Mimi Kung	T: "生命全屬我" (Alex To)	Modern drama		
26 Dec- 20 Jan 1989	The Turbulent Father 風流父子兵	20	Kenneth Tsang, Dickson Lee, Susanna Au-yeung		Modern drama		

== Other series ==
Airing date	English title (Chinese title)	Number of episodes	Main cast	Theme song (T) Sub-theme song (ST)	Genre	Notes	Official website
5 Mar- 1 Apr	The Formidable Lady from Shaolin 少林與詠春	20	Michelle Yim, Bill Chan, Maggie Siu	T: "嚴詠春" (Anita Mui)	Costume drama	Released overseas on April 20, 1987. Copyright notice: 1987.	
3 Apr- 31 Jul	Ho Ching 豪情	18	Ray Lui, Carina Lau, Margie Tsang, Wilson Lam	T: "戰場" (Jacky Cheung)	Period drama	Released overseas on June 22, 1987. Copyright notice: 1987.	
11 Apr- 6 May	The Vendetta 義薄雲天	20	Max Mok, Sheren Tang, Eddie Kwan	T: "義氣" (Adam Cheng)	Costume drama	Released overseas on August 10, 1987. Copyright notice: 1987.	
16 May- 10 Jun	Kwong Loong 狂龍	20	Bill Chan, Ray Lui, Rebecca Chan, Newton Lai	T: "那可問旁人" (Andy Hui)	Costume drama	Released overseas on November 2, 1987. Copyright notice: 1987.	
20 Jun- 15 Jul	Keung Si Kay Bing 殭屍奇兵	20	Eddie Cheung, Teresa Mo, Yvonne Lam	T: "殭屍奇兵" (Man Pui Ling)	Period drama	Released overseas on January 11, 1988. Copyright notice: 1987.	
3 Oct- 28 Oct	Hong Hei Gung 洪熙官	20	Austin Wai, Liu Kai Ji, Mimi Kung	T: "俗世如來" (David Lui)	Costume drama	Released overseas on December 17, 1986. Copyright notice: 1986.	
1 Dec- 28 Dec	Bing Kuen 兵權	20	Gordon Liu, Leon Lai, Maggie Siu, Austin Wai, Eddie Kwan	T: "絕非我自己" (Leon Lai)	Costume drama	Released overseas on June 13, 1988.	

== Warehoused series ==
These dramas were released overseas and have not broadcast on TVB Jade Channel.

Oversea released date	English title (Chinese title)	Number of episodes	Main cast	Theme song (T) Sub-theme song (ST)	Genre	Notes	Official website
4 Apr- 29 Apr	Kay Moon Gwai Gwuk 奇門鬼谷	20	Felix Wong, Jimmy Au, Mimi Kung, Alice Wong	T: "奇門鬼谷" (Canti Lau)	Costume drama		
