= List of TVB series (1991) =

This is a list of series released by or aired on TVB Jade Channel in 1991.

== First line series ==
These dramas aired in Hong Kong from 7:35pm to 8:35pm, Monday to Friday on TVB.

Airing date	English title (Chinese title)	Number of episodes	Main cast	Theme song (T) Sub-theme song (ST)	Genre	Notes	Official website
21 Jan- 15 Feb	A Tale of One City 男人勿近	20	Eddie Cheung, Ekin Cheng, Anita Lee	T: "Electric Girl" (Norman Cheung)	Modern drama		
18 Feb- 15 Mar	The Lady of Iron 男盜女差	20	Ha Yu, Teresa Mo, Bowie Lam, Candy Cheung	T: "情暖情醉情牽" (Anthony Lun)	Modern drama		
18 Mar- 12 Apr	Right to Be Born 不婚媽咪	20	Barbara Chan	T: "瘋了" (Sandy Lam)	Modern drama		
15 Apr- 10 May	Rainbow 漂白英雄	20	Elizabeth Lee, Dominic Lam, Tai Chi Wai, Michael Tao, Wayne Lai	T: "全部愛全為您" (Elizabeth Lee)	Modern drama		Official website
13 May- 5 Jul	The Breaking Point 今生無悔	40	Leon Lai, Kathy Chow, Deric Wan, Maggie Siu	T: "今生無悔" (Dave Wong) ST: "人在黎明" (Leon Lai); ST: "對不起我愛你" (Leon Lai); ST: "仍是痛在我心的你" (Deric Wan); ST: "從未試過擁有" (Deric Wan)	Modern drama	Released overseas on May 2, 1991.	
8 Jul- 2 Aug	A Life of His Own 浪族闊少爺	20	Hacken Lee, Sammi Cheng, Dickson Lee, Rain Lau	T: "代溝" (Hacken Lee)	Modern drama	First stereo production.	
5 Aug- 30 Aug	The Poor Rich Man 橫財三千萬	20	Ha Yu, Yammie Nam, Bobby Au Yeung, Betsy Cheung	T: "我早應該習慣" (Beyond)	Modern drama		
2 Sep- 27 Sep	Land of Glory 情陷特區	20	Amy Chan, Savio Tsang, David Siu, David Lui	T: "地久天長" (David Lui)	Modern drama		
30 Sep- 25 Oct	The Confidence Men 閉門一家千	20	Liu Wai Hung, Ekin Cheng, Anita Lee	T: "You Are Everything" (Grasshoppers)	Modern drama		
28 Oct- 6 Dec	The Big Family 大家族	30	Alex Man, Tien Niu, Kenneth Tsang, Elizabeth Lee, Canti Lau	T: "改變常改變" (George Lam) ST: "人海中一個你" (George Lam)	Modern drama		
9 Dec 1991- 3 Jan 1992	One Step Beyond 老友鬼鬼	20	Dicky Cheung, Deric Wan, Fiona Leung, Anita Lee	T: "我是情痴" (Deric Wan)	Modern drama		

== Second line series ==
These dramas aired in Hong Kong from 8:50pm to 9:50pm, Monday to Friday on TVB.

Airing date	English title (Chinese title)	Number of episodes	Main cast	Theme song (T) Sub-theme song (ST)	Genre	Notes	Official website
14 Jan- 8 Feb	Man from Guangdong 我係黃飛鴻	20	Aaron Kwok, Gary Chan, Shih Kien, Jessie Chan		Costume drama	Copyright notice: 1990.	
11 Feb- 22 Feb	He Who Knows Too Much 龍鳳情長	10	Liu Kai Chi, Elvina Kong		Costume drama	Copyright notice: 1990.	
25 Feb- 15 Mar	Blood and Iron 鐵血男兒	20	Anthony Wong, Eddie Kwan, Canti Lau, Fiona Leung	T: "鐵血男兒" (Canti Lau)	Modern drama	Oversea version 20 episodes Released overseas on January 14, 1991. Copyright notice: 1990.	
18 Mar- 12 Apr	A Way of Justice 人海驕陽	20	Wilson Lam, Amy Chan, Anthony Wong, Betsy Cheung	T: "我並未難過" (Wilson Lam)	Modern drama		Official website
15 Apr- 10 May	Beyond Trust 命運快車	20	Ekin Cheng, Frankie Lam	T: "無根的感覺" (Maria Cordero)	Modern drama	Released overseas on March 25, 1991.	Official website
13 May- 24 May	Destined of Love 三八佳人	10	Francis Ng, Amy Yip, Michael Tao	T: "我醉" (Ram Chiang)	Modern drama		
27 May- 21 Jun	Brother Cry for Me 忠奸老實人	20	Liu Wai Hung, Nadia Chan, Frankie Lam	T: "一顆真摯的心" (Nadia Chan)	Modern drama	Released overseas on May 15, 1991.	
24 Jun- 19 Jul	Live for Life 夢裏伊人	20	Margie Tsang, Mark Cheng, Gallen Lo, Anita Lee, Wayne Lai	T: "破曉" (Sandy Lam) ST: "愛上一個不回家的人" (Sandy Lam); ST: "天地再生" (Sandy Lam)	Modern drama		
22 Jul- 16 Aug	The Zu Mountain Saga 蜀山奇俠之仙侶奇緣	20	Ekin Cheng, Nadia Chan, Jimmy Au, Lily Chung	T: "正義柔情永在" (Deric Wan & Nadia Chan)	Ancient drama	Indirect sequel to 1990's The Gods and Demons of Zu Mountain.	
19 Aug- 20 Sep	Drifters 怒海孤鴻	25	Frankie Lam, Gigi Lai, Canti Lau, Fiona Leung	T: "怒海孤鴻" (Dave Wong)	Modern drama		
23 Sep- 29 Sep	Heartbreak Blues 與郎共舞	5	Irene Wan, Sean Lau, Yeung Ling	T: "Baby Don't Go" (Irene Wan)	Modern drama		
30 Sep- 1 Nov	On the Edge 灰網	25	Deric Wan, Francis Ng, Michael Tao, Sheren Tang	T: "隨緣" (Deric Wan)	Modern drama		
4 Nov- 29 Nov	The Sword of Conquest 怒劍嘯狂沙	20	Eddie Kwan, Kathy Chow, Rain Lau, Dickson Lee	T: "怒劍嘯狂沙" (Andy Lau)	Ancient drama		
2 Dec- 20 Dec	The Survivor 藍色風暴	15	Gallen Lo, Amy Chan, Maggie Siu	T: "一切也願意" (Shirley Kwan)	Modern drama	Overseas version 20 episodes Released overseas on August 19, 1991.	
23 Dec 1991- 10 Jan 1992	Beside the Seaside, Beside the Sea 月兒彎彎照九州	20	Ekin Cheng, Nadia Chan, Lam Lei, Jessie Chan	T: "我心中只有你" (Nadia Chan)	Period drama	Released overseas on November 22, 1990. Copyright notice: 1990.	

== Third line series ==
These dramas aired in Hong Kong from 9:50pm to 10:20pm, Monday to Friday on TVB.

Airing date	English title (Chinese title)	Number of episodes	Main cast	Theme song (T) Sub-theme song (ST)	Genre	Notes	Official website
9 Jul 1990- 29 Mar	When the Sun Shines 同居三人組	150	Roger Kwok, Hacken Lee, Joseph Lee, Wing Lam, Kiki Sheung, Dickson Lee	T: "迷離境界" (Hacken Lee)	Modern sitcom		
1 Apr- 15 Nov	Be My Guest 我愛玫瑰園	133	Anita Yuen, Eddie Cheung, Simon Lui, Power Chan, Yeung Ling	T: "我愛玫瑰園" (Jacky Cheung)	Modern sitcom		
18 Nov- 20 Nov 1992	The Family Squad 卡拉屋企	227	Angelina Lo, Anita Lee, Francis Ng, Joe Cheng, Winnie Lau	T: "香港新姿態" (Drama Cast)	Modern sitcom		Official website

== Other series ==
Airing date	English title (Chinese title)	Number of episodes	Main cast	Theme song (T) Sub-theme song (ST)	Genre	Notes	Official website
21 Jan- 15 Feb	Mystery of the Twin Swords 日月神劍	20	Roger Kwok, Dicky Cheung, Carol Yeung	T: "天洗" (Andy Hui)	Ancient drama	Prequel to 1992's Mystery of the Twin Swords II. Released overseas on October 22, 1990. Copyright notice: 1990.	
19 Feb- 16 Mar	The Ruin of War 黃土恩情	20	Liu Wai Hung, David Siu, Tsui Ga Bo	T: "無悔的愛" (David Lui)	Period drama	Released overseas on December 18, 1989. Copyright notice: 1989 (Eps. 1-13 & 15–17), 1990 (Eps. 14 & 18–20).	
19 Mar- 13 Apr	The Black Sabre 邊城浪子	20	Hugo Ng, Margie Tsang, Eddie Cheung, Shalline Tse, Fiona Leung,	T: "還有明天" (Cally Kwong)	Costume drama	Released overseas on June 22, 1989. Copyright notice: 1989.	
13 Apr- 6 Jul	The Crime File 幹探群英	13	Donnie Yen, Eddie Kwan	T: "黑白之間" (Christopher Wong)	Modern drama		
16 Apr- 11 May	Yuppies on the Move 打工貴族	20	Anthony Wong, Pauline Yeung, Jacqueline Law, Aaron Kwok, Maggie Shiu	T: "打工貴族" (Andy Hui)	Modern drama	Released overseas on August 7, 1989. Copyright notice: 1989.	
14 May- 8 Jun	Mystery of the Parchment 天龍奇俠	20	Gallen Lo, Canti Lau, Kitty Lai, Donna Chu, Betty Mak	T: "笑容入我眼" (Gallen Lo)	Costume drama	Released overseas on March 5, 1990. Copyright notice: 1990.	
11 Jun- 6 Jul	Impossible Dream 未婚爸爸	20	David Siu, Eddie Kwan, Anita Lee	T: "迷失的方向" (Jacky Cheung)	Modern drama	Released overseas on September 25, 1989. Copyright notice: 1989.	
5 Oct- 25 Jan 1992	Police on the Road 皇家鐵馬	13	Gallen Lo, Vincent Wan	T: "原諒我" (Gallen Lo)	Modern drama		

== Warehoused series ==
These dramas were released overseas and have not broadcast on TVB Jade Channel.

Oversea released date	English title (Chinese title)	Number of episodes	Main cast	Theme song (T) Sub-theme song (ST)	Genre	Notes	Official website
23 Sep- 11 Oct	A New Life 命運迷宫	15	Donnie Yen, Savio Tsang, Margie Tsang, Kitty Lai	T: "命運迷宮" (Tai Chi)	Modern drama		
