= Lists of TVB dramas and series =

Following are lists of dramas and series produced by Hong-Kong bases television network TVB.

== Dramas ==
- List of TVB dramas in 2010
- List of TVB dramas in 2011
- List of TVB dramas in 2012
- List of TVB dramas in 2013
- List of TVB dramas in 2014
- List of TVB dramas in 2015
- List of TVB dramas in 2016
- List of TVB dramas in 2017
- List of TVB dramas in 2018
- List of TVB dramas in 2019
- List of TVB dramas in 2020
- List of TVB dramas in 2021
- List of TVB dramas in 2022
- List of TVB dramas in 2023
- List of TVB dramas in 2024
- List of TVB dramas in 2025
- List of TVB dramas in 2026
- List of TVB dramas in 2027

== Series ==
- List of TVB series (1977)
- List of TVB series (1978)
- List of TVB series (1979)
- List of TVB series (1980)
- List of TVB series (1981)
- List of TVB series (1982)
- List of TVB series (1983)
- List of TVB series (1984)
- List of TVB series (1985)
- List of TVB series (1986)
- List of TVB series (1987)
- List of TVB series (1988)
- List of TVB series (1989)
- List of TVB series (1990)
- List of TVB series (1991)
- List of TVB series (1992)
- List of TVB series (1993)
- List of TVB series (1994)
- List of TVB series (1995)
- List of TVB series (1996)
- List of TVB series (1997)
- List of TVB series (1998)
- List of TVB series (1995)
- List of TVB series (1999)
- List of TVB series (2000)
- List of TVB series (2001)
- List of TVB series (2002)
- List of TVB series (2003)
- List of TVB series (2004)
- List of TVB series (2005)
- List of TVB series (2006)
- List of TVB series (2007)
- List of TVB series (2008)
- List of TVB series (2009)
