= List of TVB series (1987) =

This is a list of series released by or aired on TVB Jade Channel in 1987.

== First line series ==
These dramas aired in Hong Kong from 7:10pm to 8:10pm, Monday to Friday on TVB.

Airing date	English title (Chinese title)	Number of episodes	Main cast	Theme song (T) Sub-theme song (ST)	Genre	Notes	Official website
26 Jan- 20 Feb	The Upstart and the Self-Made Man 工字打出頭	20	Felix Wong, Eugina Lau, Anthony Tang	T: "原因" (Terrance Choi)	Modern drama	Copyright notice: 1986.	
23 Feb- 6 Mar	The Wacky Wife 吾妻十三點	10	Carol Cheng		Modern drama		
9 Mar- 29 May	The Grand Canal 大運河	60	Tony Leung, Idy Chan, Felix Wong, Sean Lau, Margie Tsang, Lawrence Ng, Jimmy Au, Alice Wong, Rebecca Chan	T: "雄霸天下" (Tony Leung & David Lui)	Costume drama		
1 Jun- 26 Jun	The Greenhorns 大城小子	18	Sheren Tang, Jimmy Wong, Mimi Kung	T: "大城小子" (Gallen Lo)	Period drama		
29 Jun- 10 Jul	Young Beat 鐳射青春	12	Ekin Cheng, William So	T: "長征" (Tat Ming Pair)	Modern drama		Official website
13 Jul- 7 Aug	Love in a Decadent City 錯愛	20	Eddie Cheung, Kathy Chow, Eddie Kwan	T: "錯愛" (Danny Chan)	Modern drama		
10 Aug- 21 Aug	Beastly Beings 北斗前鋒	20	Barbara Chan, Simon Yam, Francis Ng, Mimi Kung, Maggie Siu		Costume drama		
24 Aug- 13 Nov	The Price of Growing Up 生命之旅	59	Alex Man, Francis Ng, Carol Cheng, Kathy Chow, May Ng, Stephen Chow, Hugo Ng	T: "無限旅程" (Kenny Bee)	Modern drama		
23 Nov- 18 Dec	The Curtain Rises 正印冤家	20	Violet Lee, Maggie Chan, Bonnie Law, Andy Tai		Modern drama		
21 Dec- 15 Jan 1988	The Making of a Gentleman 時來運到	20	Eddie Cheung, Liu Wai Hung, Kiki Sheung, Lau Dan, Mimi Kung	T: "星夜" (Terrance Choi)	Modern drama		

== Second line series ==
These dramas aired in Hong Kong from 8:10pm to 8:40pm, Monday to Friday on TVB.

Airing date	English title (Chinese title)	Number of episodes	Main cast	Theme song (T) Sub-theme song (ST)	Genre	Notes	Official website
14 Jul 1986- 8 Apr 1988	City Story 城市故事	443	Deric Wan, Gallen Lo		Modern sitcom		

== Third line series ==
These dramas aired in Hong Kong from 8:50pm to 9:50pm, Monday to Friday on TVB.

Airing date	English title (Chinese title)	Number of episodes	Main cast	Theme song (T) Sub-theme song (ST)	Genre	Notes	Official website
29 Jan- 30 Jan	The Match Making Game 快活良緣	2	Susanna Au Yeung, Lau Dan		Modern drama		
2 Feb- 6 Mar	When Silken Hands Get Rough 靜待黎明	25	Barbara Chan, Margie Tsang, Sean Lau	T: "靜待黎明" (Susanna Kwan)	Costume drama		
9 Mar- 17 Apr	Foundling's Progress 男兒本色	30	Wilson Lam, Barbara Chan, Leon Lai, Shallin Tse	T: "錯在情多" (Man Pui Ling)	Modern drama		
20 Apr- 15 May	Operation Sharkhunt 獵鯊行動	20	Maggie Siu, Ray Lui, Cally Kwong, Kiki Sheung	T: "誰之過" (Jacky Cheung)	Modern drama		
18 May- 12 Jun	The Story of Ah Qual 阿嬌正傳	20	Dominic Lam, Barbara Chan, Francis Ng	T: "為何" (Sally Yeh)	Costume drama		
15 Jun- 17 Jul	Zheng Cheng Gong 鄭成功	24	Ray Lui, Jamie Chik, Francis Ng, Deborah Lee	T' "心裡長城" (Roman Tam)	Costume drama		Official website
20 Jul- 14 Aug	Fate Takes A Hand 杜心五	20	Adam Cheng, Carina Lau, Kathy Chow, Simon Yam	T: "執手同行" (Adam Cheng)	Costume drama		
17 Aug- 11 Sep	The Conspiracy 飲馬江湖	18	Jimmy Au, Eddie Kwan, Maggie Siu	T: "飲馬江湖" (RAIDAS)	Costume drama		
14 Sep- 25 Sep	Genghis Khan 成吉思汗	10	Alex Man, Felix Wong, Sean Lau, Shallin Tse, Eddie Kwan	T: "問誰領風騷" (Roman Tam & Jenny Tseng)	Costume drama		
28 Sep- 16 Oct	Born to be a King 大明群英	18	Simon Yam, Sean Lau, Barbara Chan, Alice Wong	T: "人類的錯" (Michael Kwan)	Costume drama		Official website
19 Oct- 20 Nov	The Legend of the Book and the Sword 書劍恩仇錄	25	Simon Yam, Lawrence Ng, Kitty Lai, Fiona Leung, Jacqueline Law, Barbara Chan, Jamie Chik, Bill Chan	T: "胡漢夢" (Canti Lau & Fong Hiu Hung)	Costume drama		
23 Nov- 15 Jan 1988	Police Cadet '88 新紮師兄1988	40	Tony Leung, Margie Tsang, Eddy Ko, Sheren Tang, Dominic Lam, Chingmy Yau	T: "衝刺" (Tony Leung)	Modern drama	Sequel to 1985's Police Cadet '85.	

== Other series ==
Airing date	English title (Chinese title)	Number of episodes	Main cast	Theme song (T) Sub-theme song (ST)	Genre	Notes	Official website
6 Jun- 3 Jul	The SIB Files 大班密令	20	Bill Chan, Ray Lui, Rebecca Chan	T: "光明之戰" (Anthony Lun)	Modern drama	Released overseas on December 4, 1986. Copyright notice: 1986.	
5 Sep- 2 Oct	The Dragon Sword 天龍神劍	20	Michael Miu, Sean Lau, Margie Tsang, Jaime Chik, Amy Chan	T: "劍斷魂在" (Andy Hui)	Costume drama	Released overseas on February 14, 1987. Copyright notice: 1986.	

== Warehoused series ==
These dramas were released overseas and have not broadcast on TVB Jade Channel.

Oversea released date	English title (Chinese title)	Number of episodes	Main cast	Theme song (T) Sub-theme song (ST)	Genre	Notes	Official website
14 Dec- 8 Jan 1988	Tin Long Kip 天狼劫	20	Andy Lau, Maggie Siu, Newton Lai	T: "天狼劫" (Man Pui Ling)	Costume drama		
