= List of TVB series (1992) =

This is a list of series released by or aired on TVB Jade Channel in 1992.

== First line series ==
These dramas aired in Hong Kong from 7:35pm to 8:35pm, Monday to Friday on TVB.

Airing date	English title (Chinese title)	Number of episodes	Main cast	Theme song (T) Sub-theme song (ST)	Genre	Notes	Official website
6 Jan- 17 Jan	Letting Go 三喜臨門	10	Louise Lee, Gary Chan, Kenneth Chan, Mannor Chan	T: "三喜臨門" (Nadia Chan)	Modern drama	Released overseas on January 3, 1992. Copyright notice: 1991.	Official website
20 Jan- 14 Feb	Love and Marriage 屬雞的男人	20	Liu Wai Hung, Amy Chan, Wing Lam, Li Ka Sing, Benz Hui	T: "Home Alone" (Joe Cheng, Raymond Choi, & Ekin Cheng)	Modern drama	Released overseas on January 17, 1992. Copyright notice: 1991.	
17 Feb- 13 Mar	The Commandments 武林幸運星	20	Deric Wan, Cutie Mui, Vivian Chow	T: "幸運福星" (Deric Wan)	Costume drama	Copyright notice: 1991.	
16 Mar- 10 Apr	Odd Man Out 反斗威龍	20	Bryan Leung, David Lui, Alex To, Elvina Kong	T: "總有一天等到你" (Alex To)	Modern drama	Released overseas on March 9, 1992.	
13 Apr- 8 May	Source of Evil 我為錢狂	20	Eddie Kwan, Prudence Liew, Anita Yuen, Gary Chan	T: "獨自暢飲" (George Lam)	Modern drama	Released overseas on April 9, 1992.	
11 May- 5 Jun	Mystery of the Twin Swords II 捉妖奇兵	20	Roger Kwok, Dicky Cheung, Carol Yeung, Rain Lau	T: "真真假假" (Dicky Cheung)	Costume drama	Sequel to 1991's Mystery of the Twin Swords. Released overseas on May 8, 1992.	
8 Jun- 3 Jul	Beyond Love 破繭邊緣	20	Bowie Lam, Eddie Cheung, Loletta Lee, Maggie Chan	T: "一世濃情" (Timothy Wong Yik)	Modern drama	Released overseas on May 21, 1992.	Official website
6 Jul- 31 Jul	Eastern Hero 龍影俠	20	Eddie Kwan, Hacken Lee, Gigi Lai	T: "龍影俠" (Hacken Lee) ST: "無聲慰問" (Hacken Lee); ST: "妳是我的太陽" (Hacken Lee)	Period drama	Released overseas on July 2, 1992.	
3 Aug- 21 Aug	Peak of Passion 沖天小子	15	Remus Choi, Julian Cheung, Vikki Tong, Calvin Choi, Edmond So	T: "三分鐘放縱" (Grasshoppers)	Modern drama		
24 Aug- 18 Sep	The Stake 賭霸	20	Roger Kwok, Gigi Lai	T: "笑吧" (Timothy Wong Yik)	Modern drama	Released overseas on August 7, 1992.	
21 Sep- 2 Oct	The Private Eye 小男人出差	10	Li Ka Sing, Ha Yu, Fiona Leung	T: "一夜危情" (Sam Tsang)	Modern drama		
5 Oct- 27 Nov	The Greed of Man 大時代	40	Adam Cheng, Damian Lau, Sean Lau, Yammie Lam, Vivian Chow, David Siu, Loletta Lee, Amy Kwok, Bowie Lam	T: "我的生命我的愛" (Alan Tam); ST: "歲月無情" (Adam Cheng)	Modern drama	Grand production Adam Cheng's comeback series.	Official website
30 Nov- 25 Dec	Being Twins 兄兄我我	20	Liu Wai Hung, Bowie Lam, Vivien Leung, Cutie Mui	T: "點解點解" (Beyond)	Modern drama		
28 Dec 1992- 22 Jan 1993	The Crime Fighters 九反威龍	20	Alex Fong, Maggie Siu, Ekin Cheng, Savio Tsang	T: "前鋒" (Ekin Cheng)	Modern drama	Copyright notice: 1992 (Eps. 1-19), 1993 (Ep. 20).	Official website

== Second line series ==
These dramas aired in Hong Kong from 8:50pm to 9:50pm, Monday to Friday on TVB.

Airing date	English title (Chinese title)	Number of episodes	Main cast	Theme song (T) Sub-theme song (ST)	Genre	Notes	Official website
13 Jan- 6 Mar	The Change of Time 龍的天空	40	Frankie Lam, Francis Ng, Louise Lee, Maggie Siu, Gigi Lai	T: "天天向上" (Anthony Wong) ST: "梦里可是谁" (Terence Tsoi)	Modern drama		
9 Mar- 3 Apr	The Mark Of Triumph; 92鍾無豔	20	Ekin Cheng, Nadia Chan, Josephine Lam, Sam Tsang	T: "夢境成真" (Nadia Chan)	Modern drama		
6 Apr- 1 May	Super Cop 重案傳真	20	Canti Lau, Emily Kwan, Andy Hui, Yolinda Yan, Benz Hui	T: "誰是我知己" (Andy Hui)	Modern drama		Official website
4 May- 26 Jun	Vengeance 火玫瑰	40	Irene Wan, Deric Wan, Gallen Lo, Vincent Wan	T: "海潮" (Irene Wan)	Modern action		Official website
29 Jun- 24 Jul	Money and Fame 拳賭雙至尊	20	Dicky Cheung, Kong Ng, Elvina Kong, Bobby Au Yeung	T: "得到多少暖" (Ram Chiang & Sarah Wong)	Period drama	Released overseas on December 2, 1991. Copyright notice: 1991.	
27 Jul- 4 Sep	The Key Man 巨人	30	Alex Man, Idy Chan, Wilson Lam, Dicky Cheung, Monica Chan, Cutie Mui, Louise Lee	T: "你震撼我的心靈" (Andy Lau)	Modern drama		
7 Sep- 2 Oct	Angel's Call 他來自天堂	20	Anita Yuen, Hacken Lee, Rain Lau	T: "紅日" (Hacken Lee)	Modern drama		Official website
5 Oct- 30 Oct	Once Upon a Time in Hong Kong 血濺塘西	20	Dave Wong, Sheren Tang, Hugo Ng, Power Chan	T: "假如能夠" (Dave Wong)	Period drama		
2 Nov- 4 Dec	Revelation of the Last Hero 風之刀	25	Aaron Kwok, Vivien Leung, Frankie Lam, Ada Choi, Fennie Yuen	T: "霧裡清風" (Aaron Kwok)	Costume drama	Overseas version 30 episodes	
7 Dec 1992- 1 Jan 1993	The Wong Fei Hung Returns 我愛牙擦蘇	20	Dicky Cheung, Gigi Lai, Bobby Au Yeung, Winnie Lau	T: "哎呀哎呀親親你" (张卫健) ST: "烟雨情浓" (张卫健)	Costume drama		

== Third line series ==
These dramas aired in Hong Kong from 9:50pm to 10:20pm, Monday to Friday on TVB.

Airing date	English title (Chinese title)	Number of episodes	Main cast	Theme song (T) Sub-theme song (ST)	Genre	Notes	Official website
18 Nov 1991- 20 Nov 1992	The Family Squad 卡拉屋企	227	Angelina Lo, Francis Ng, Joe Cheng, Bobby Au Yeung, Anita Lee	T: "香港新姿態" (Drama Cast)	Modern sitcom		Official website
23 Nov 1992- 7 May 1993	Class of 93' 愛生事家庭	117	Ha Yu, Deric Wan, Irene Wan	T: "愛生事家庭" (Ha Yu, Deric Wan, & Irene Wan)	Modern sitcom		

== Other series ==
Airing date	English title (Chinese title)	Number of episodes	Main cast	Theme song (T) Sub-theme song (ST)	Genre	Notes	Official website
7 Jan- 31 Mar	Big Little Man 摩登小男人	13	Lawrence Cheng		Modern drama	Copyright notice: 1991 (Ep. 1), 1992 (Eps. 2-13).	
19 Apr- 12 Jul	File of Justice 壹號皇庭	13	Michael Tao, Bobby Au Yeung, Sammi Cheng, Amy Chan, Felix Lok		Modern drama	Prequel to 1993's File of Justice II.	Official website
29 Jun- 24 Jul	Thief of Honour 血璽金刀	20	Dicky Cheung, Ekin Cheng, Noel Leung	T: "情深义重" (Paula Tsui)	Costume drama	Released overseas on April 12, 1991. Copyright notice: 1991.	
10 Aug- 4 Sep	Bet on Best Bet 闔府搶錢	20	Ha Yu, Andy Hui, Jimmy Wong, Noel Leung	T: "闔府搶錢" (Andy Hui)	Modern drama	Released overseas on December 16, 1991. Copyright notice: 1991.	
7 Sep- 2 Oct	The Man The Ghost and The Fox 人鬼狐	20	Hugo Ng, Jimmy Au, Lily Chung	T: "情歸何處" (Tsui Chan Tung)	Costume drama	Released overseas on April 4, 1991. Copyright notice: 1991.	
5 Oct- 30 Oct	You Light Up My Life 夢斷銀城	15	Canti Lau, Jacqueline Law, Jimmy Wong	T: "是緣是債是場夢" (Canti Lau)	Modern drama	Released overseas on November 18, 1991. Copyright notice: 1991.	
26 Oct- 20 Nov	Land of the Condor 大地飛鷹	20	Francis Ng, Kitty Lai, David Siu	T: "柔情冷看千夫指" (Leon Lai)	Costume drama	Released overseas on June 17, 1991. Copyright notice: 1991.	

== Warehoused series ==
These dramas were released overseas and have not broadcast on TVB Jade Channel.

Oversea released date	English title (Chinese title)	Number of episodes	Main cast	Theme song (T) Sub-theme song (ST)	Genre	Notes	Official website
10 Feb	Road For The Heroes 出位江湖	20	Roger Kwok, Elvina Kong, Jessie Chan, Michael Tao	T: "紅葉舞秋山" (Jacky Cheung)	Costume drama	Copyright notice: 1991 (Eps. 1-3, 6-9, 11-12, 14, & 17-18), 1992 (Eps. 4-5, 10, 13, 15-16, & 19-20).	
18 May- 12 Jun	Bet on Fate 大賭場	20	Gallen Lo, David Siu, Kenneth Tsang, Suki Kwan	T: "封鎖我一生" (Dave Wong)	Modern drama		
12 Oct- 6 Nov	Story of the Water Margin 水滸英雄傳	20	Savio Tsang, Anita Yuen, Jimmy Au, Lily Chung	T: "始終倔強" (Norman Cheung)	Costume drama		
31 Oct	Rage and Passion 中神通王重陽	20	Ekin Cheng, Fiona Leung, Gallen Lo, Vivian Chow, Eddie Kwan	T: "匆匆一夢中" (Andy Hui)	Costume drama		
