= List of TVB series (1986) =

This is a list of series released by or aired on TVB Jade Channel in 1986.

== First line series ==
These dramas aired in Hong Kong from 7:05pm to 8:00pm, Monday to Friday on TVB.

Airing date	English title (Chinese title)	Number of episodes	Main cast	Theme song (T) Sub-theme song (ST)	Genre	Notes	Official website
20 Jan- 14 Feb	Movie Maze 銀色旅途	20	Sean Lau, Mimi Kung, Francis Ng, Maggie Siu, Eugina Lau	T: "友情" (Terrance Choi)	Modern drama		
17 Feb- 14 Mar	General Father, General Son 薛丁山征西	20	Felix Wong, Mimi Kung, Barbara Chan	T: "成敗不必理會" (Frances Yip)	Costume drama	Copyright notice: 1985 (Eps. 1-5, 9-13, & 16-20), 1986 (Eps. 6-8 & 14-15).	
17 Mar- 9 May	The Return of Luk Siu Fung 陸小鳳之鳳舞九天	40	Alex Man, Rebecca Chan, Wong Wan Choi, Austin Wai, Flora King	T: "留下我美夢" (Jenny Tseng)	Costume drama		
12 May- 6 Jun	The Unyielding Master Lim 林沖	20	Eddy Ko, Jamie Chik, Kent Tong, Barbara Chan	T: "風雪前塵" (Deric Wan)	Costume drama		
9 Jun- 4 Jul	Heir to the Throne Is... 真命天子	20	Andy Lau, Liu Kai-chi, Yammie Lam, Susanna Au Yeung, Kathy Chow	T: "編織美夢" (Kenny Bee)	Costume drama		
7 Jul- 1 Aug	The Twin Heirs 孖寶太子	20	Simon Yam, Cally Kwong, Margie Tsang, Maggie Siu	T: "清風" (Jacky Cheung)	Modern drama		Official website
4 Aug- 22 Aug	Young Hearts, High Hopes 高材生	15	Jimmy Wong, Tiffany Liu, Ken Mok, Debbre Tsui	T: "輸得起" (Deric Wan)	Modern drama		
25 Aug- 19 Sep	The Superlative Affections 赤腳紳士	20	David Lui, Kathy Chow, Sean Lau	T: "君心知我心" (David Lui)	Period drama		Official website
6 Oct- 26 Dec	The Turbulent Decade 黃金十年	60	Eddie Cheung, Carina Lau, Jamie Chik, Bill Chan, Dicky Cheung, Deborah Lee, Eddie Kwan, Kiki Sheung, Margie Tsang	T: "癡心的廢墟" (Alan Tam); ST: "曾經" (Alan Tam)	Modern drama		Official website
29 Dec- 24 Jan 1987	A Taste of Bachelorhood 鑽石王老五	20	Lawrence Ng, Teresa Mo, Yammie Nam, Francis Ng, Kiki Sheung	T: "癡心眼內藏" (Danny Chan)	Modern drama		

== Second line series ==
These dramas aired in Hong Kong from 8:00pm to 8:30pm, Monday to Friday on TVB.

Airing date	English title (Chinese title)	Number of episodes	Main cast	Theme song (T) Sub-theme song (ST)	Genre	Notes	Official website
8 Jun 1981- 11 Jul	Hong Kong 1986 香港八六	1400	Lee Sing Cheung, Lee Kar Ding		Modern sitcom		
14 Jul 1986- 8 Apr 1988	City Story 城市故事	443	Deric Wan, Gallen Lo		Modern sitcom		

== Third line series ==
These dramas aired in Hong Kong from 8:30pm to 9:30pm, Monday to Friday on TVB.

Airing date	English title (Chinese title)	Number of episodes	Main cast	Theme song (T) Sub-theme song (ST)	Genre	Notes	Official website
13 Jan- 7 Feb	The Brothers Under the Skin 遁甲奇兵	20	Felix Wong, Sheren Tang, Kiki Sheung	T: "奇門遁甲" (Danny Summer)	Costume drama	Copyright notice: 1985.	
10 Feb- 14 Feb	Next Year, Next Kin 愛情全盒	5	Lawrence Ng, Yammie Nam	T: "愛情全盒" (Tai Wung Wai)	Modern drama		
17 Feb- 14 Mar	The Legend of Dikching 狄青	20	Michael Miu, Kitty Lai, Shalline Tse	T: "迷離" (Sally Yeh)	Costume drama	Copyright notice: 1985 (Eps. 1-17 & 19-20), 1986 (Ep. 18).	Official website
17 Mar- 11 Apr	Siblings of Vice and Virtue 神勇CID	20	Eddie Cheung, Barbara Chan, Joseph Lee, Deborah Lee	T: "英雄莫笑痴" (David Lui)	Modern drama		
14 Apr- 9 May	The Ordeal Before the Revolution 賊公阿牛	20	Felix Wong, Kitty Lai, Patricia Chong	T: "只有情永在" (Jacky Cheung & Cally Kwong)	Period drama		
12 May- 20 Jun	The Feud of Two Brothers 流氓大亨	30	Alex Man, Carol Cheng, Kwan Hoi Shan, Carina Lau, Lawrence Ng, Kathy Chow	T: "城市足印" (Paula Tsui)	Modern drama		Official website
23 Jun- 18 Jul	The Upheaval 小島風雲	20	Ray Lui, Idy Chan, Kathy Chow	T: "小島風雲" (Cally Kwong)	Period drama		
21 Jul- 12 Sep	The Blood Stained Intrigue 神劍魔刀	40	Jimmy Au, Newton Lai, Sylvia Ng, Wong Wan Choi, Carrie Choi	T: "黑白難辨" (Teresa Cheung Tak Lan)	Costume drama		Official website
15 Sep- 10 Oct	Legendary of Wong Tai Sin 黃大仙	20	Adam Cheng, Patrick Tse, Susanna Au Yeung, Sheren Tang, Rebecca Chan, Kitty Lai, Patricia Chong	T: "光照萬世" (Adam Cheng)	Costume drama		
13 Oct- 31 Oct	Turn Around and Die 英雄故事	14	Alex Man, Yammie Nam, Kitty Lai, Jimmy Wong, Patrick Tse	T: "心中的血" (Johnny Yip)	Period drama		
3 Nov- 30 Dec	New Heavenly Sword and Dragon Sabre 倚天屠龍記	40	Tony Leung, Kitty Lai, Sheren Tang, Maggie Siu, Carol Cheng, Simon Yam, Kenneth Tsang, Newton Lai	T "劍伴誰在" (Tony Leung & Anita Mui)	Costume drama		
31 Dec- 27 Jan 1987	Dhrama 達摩	20	Ray Lui, Teresa Mo, Amy Chan, Jimmy Au	T: "達摩" (Cheung Ming Man)	Costume drama		

== Warehoused series ==
These dramas were released overseas and have not broadcast on TVB Jade Channel.

Oversea released date	English title (Chinese title)	Number of episodes	Main cast	Theme song (T) Sub-theme song (ST)	Genre	Notes	Official website
14 Apr- 9 May	Destined to Rebel 薛剛反唐	20	Sean Lau, Eugina Lau, Eddie Kwan, Francis Ng	T: "薛剛反唐" (Roman Tam)	Costume drama		
