= List of TVB series (1985) =

This is a list of series released by or aired on TVB Jade Channel in 1985.

== First line series ==
These dramas aired in Hong Kong from 7:05pm to 8:00pm, Monday to Friday on TVB.

Airing date	English title (Chinese title)	Number of episodes	Main cast	Theme song (T) Sub-theme song (ST)	Genre	Notes	Official website
21 Jan- 15 Feb	The Young Wanderer 江湖浪子	20	Felix Wong, Carina Lau, Paul Chun, Patricia Chong	T: "江湖浪子" (Kitman Mak)	Costume drama	Copyright notice: 1984.	
18 Feb- 22 Feb	Happy Ending 遊龍戲鳳	5	Liu Wai Hung, Simon Yam, Elanie Chow		Costume drama		
25 Feb- 22 Mar	The Last Performance 鼓舞	20	Andy Lau, Teresa Mo	T: "勁舞者" (Elisa Chan)	Modern drama	Copyright notice: 1984.	
25 Mar- 19 Apr	Sword Stained with Royal Blood 碧血劍	20	Felix Wong, Teresa Mo, Patricia Chong, Michael Miu, Lawrence Ng, Regina Tsang	T: "情冷情熱" (Ken Choi & Amy Chan)	Costume drama		
22 Apr- 14 Jun	The Rough Ride 挑戰	40	Tony Leung, Barbara Yung, Lau Dan, Ray Lui, Ha Yu, Michael Tao, Barbara Chan	T: "我與你 他與我" (Anita Mui)	Modern drama		Official website
17 Jun- 12 Jul	Under The Sun 光怪陸離	20	Stanley Fung, Newton Lai, Mary Hon, Lisa Lui, Wong Wan Choi	T: "褪色的愛" (Michael Kwan)	Modern drama		
15 Jul- 26 Jul	Form 4D 中四丁班	10	Lawrence Ng, Dicky Cheung, Barbara Chan	T: "中四丁班" (Sherrie Lo)	Modern drama		
29 Jul- 23 Aug	The Tough Fight 後生可畏	20	Felix Wong, Carina Lau, Kent Tong	T: "愛是無奈" (Johnny Yip)	Modern drama		
2 Sep- 27 Sep	The Condo 大廈	20	Michael Miu, Susanna Au Yeung, Mimi Kung, Barbara Chan	T: "心裡那點真" (Anita Mui)	Modern drama		
30 Sep- 25 Oct	Take Care, Your Highness! 皇上保重	20	Andy Lau, Carina Lau, Sean Lau, Ha Yu, Paul Chun	T "龍的心" (Johnny Yip)	Costume drama		
28 Oct- 20 Dec	Police Cadet '85 新紮師兄續集	40	Tony Leung, Chow Yun-fat, Margie Tsang, Carina Lau, Simon Yam, Jamie Chik, David Lui	T: "新紮師兄" (Tony Leung)	Modern drama	Sequel to 1984's Police Cadet '84. Prequel to 1987's Police Cadet '88.	
23 Dec- 17 Jan 1986	Happy Spirit 開心女鬼	20	Carol Cheng, Ray Lui, Sheren Tang, Dicky Cheung	T: "倆心未變" (Anita Mui)	Modern drama		Official website

== Second line series ==
These dramas aired in Hong Kong from 8:00pm to 8:30pm, Monday to Friday on TVB.

Airing date	English title (Chinese title)	Number of episodes	Main cast	Theme song (T) Sub-theme song (ST)	Genre	Notes	Official website
8 Jun 1981- 11 Jul 1986	Hong Kong 1985 香港八五	1400	Lee Sing Cheung, Lee Kar Ding		Modern sitcom		

== Third line series ==
These dramas aired in Hong Kong from 8:30pm to 9:30pm, Monday to Friday on TVB.

Airing date	English title (Chinese title)	Number of episodes	Main cast	Theme song (T) Sub-theme song (ST)	Genre	Notes	Official website
7 Jan- 8 Feb	The Legend of the Ching Lady 呂四娘	25	Carol Cheng, Simon Yam, Ray Lui, Austin Wai, Patricia Chong	T: "願死也為情" (Sally Yeh)	Costume drama	Copyright notice: 1984.	
11 Feb- 1 Mar	To Each Its Own 錯體姻緣	15	Ray Lui, Louise Lee, Kenneth Tsang, Carina Lau	T: "愛情OK膠" (Teresa Cheung Tak Lan)	Modern drama		Official website
4 Mar- 29 Mar	The Fallen Family 武林世家	20	Leslie Cheung, Maggie Cheung, Patrick Tse	T: "浮生若夢" (Leslie Cheung)	Costume drama	Copyright notice: 1984.	
1 Apr- 26 Apr	The Brave Squad 好女當差	20	Idy Chan, Ray Lui, Kent Tong	T: "頂天立地" (Michelle Pao)	Modern drama	Copyright notice: 1984.	
29 Apr- 24 May	Legend of the General Who Never Was 薛仁貴征東	20	Alex Man, Sheren Tang, Paul Chun, Michael Tao	T: "兩地情" (Michelle Pao)	Costume drama		Official website
27 May- 5 Jul	The Battle Among the Clans 大香港	30	Chow Yun-fat, Eddie Kwan, David Lui, Sean Lau, Mimi Kung	T: "愛的尋覓" (Kitman Mak)	Period drama		Official website
8 Jul- 2 Aug	The Pitfall 種計	20	Carol Cheng, Simon Yam, Susanna Au Yeung	T: "愛情賭注" (Jenny Tseng)	Modern drama		Official website
5 Aug- 13 Sep	The Battlefield 楚河漢界	30	Bill Chan, Lawrence Ng, Idy Chan, Kiki Sheung, Austin Wai, Barbara Yung	T: "楚河漢界" (Alan Tam)	Costume drama		
16 Sep- 11 Oct	The Feud That Never Was 拆擋拍擋	20	Eddie Kwan, Maggie Cheung, Patricia Chong	T: "拆擋拍擋" (Bennette Pang)	Modern drama		
14 Oct- 6 Dec	The Flying Fox of the Snowy Mountain 雪山飛狐	40	Ray Lui, Angie Chiu, Margie Tsang, Patrick Tse, Rebecca Chan, Kenneth Tsang, Elanie Chow, Flora King, Jaime Chik	T: "雪山飛狐" (Susanna Kwan & David Lui)	Costume drama		
9 Dec- 3 Jan 1986	The Possessed 六指琴魔	25	Kwan Hoi Shan, Bill Chan, Yammie Nam, Lawrence Ng, Sheren Tang	T: "大步上青雲" (Michael Kwan)	Costume drama		Official website
