= Fei Fu Kwan Ying =

- Official poster
- Also known as: Flying Squads
- Traditional Chinese: 飛虎群英
- Simplified Chinese: 飞虎群英
- Literal meaning: Flying Tiger Hero Squad
- Hanyu Pinyin: fēi hǔ qún yīng
- Jyutping: fei1 fu2 kwan4 jing1
- Genre: Crime thriller Action
- Screenplay by: Wong Hon-wah; Chung Tak-wing; Cheng Yau-hing; Yu Hon-wing; Law Kam-fai
- Directed by: Lee Shu-fan; Chu Yik-lung; Au Tak-fai; Wai Hon-to
- Starring: Donnie Yen; Pauline Yeung; Eddie Kwan; Anita Lee; Oscar Lam; Mini Kung; Angelina Lo; Tam Hing-chuen
- Theme music composer: Michael Lai
- Opening theme: Abyss (深淵) by Alex To
- Country of origin: Hong Kong
- Original language: Cantonese
- No. of episodes: 15 (Hong Kong); 20 (Overseas)

Production
- Producer: Tommy Leung
- Production location: Hong Kong
- Camera setup: Multi camera
- Production company: TVB

Original release
- Network: TVB Jade
- Release: 7 August – 25 August 1989

Fei Fu Kwan Ying, also known by its alternative title Flying Squads, is a 1989 Hong Kong action crime thriller television series produced by TVB and starring Donnie Yen, Pauline Yeung and Eddie Kwan. Originally aired from 7 to 25 August 1989 on TVB Jade, the series reran on TVB's Network Vision channel from 11 to 29 January 2016 on weekends as a part of the special, Our... Donnie Yen (我們的...甄子丹), which began running on the same day.

== Plot ==
Cheung Ho-nam (Donnie Yen), Lau Chuen-hang (Eddie Kwan) and Cheng Sing (Oscar Lam) are three best friends. Ho-nam and Sing later joined the Special Duties Unit of the Hong Kong Police Force while Cheun-hang inherit his father's triad business. Although on opposite sides of the law, they were able to accommodate each other due to their strong friendship. Chuen-hang's younger sister, Chuen-fong (Anita Lee), has a crush on Ho-nam, however, Ho-nam is dating fellow police officer, Kei-kei (Pauline Yeung). Feeling broken-hearted, Chuen-fong marries Sing, who had been secretly admiring her. When Chuen-hang first go involved in the underworld, he was tricked by the elders. With the support and encouragement of his confidante, Anita (Mimi Kung), Chuen-hang finally eliminated dissidents and his influence gradually expands. Chuen-hang becomes a triad leader and his friendship with Ho-nam shatters. Ho-nam has vowed to bring Chuen-hang to justice. Later on, Chuen-hang causes the deaths of Sing, Anita, Chuen-fong and Ho-nam's older sister, Ng (Angelina Lo), leading to a tense and brutal battle between Ho-nam and Chuen-hang.

== Cast ==
- Donnie Yen as Cheung Ho-nam (張皓南)
- Pauline Yeung as Lei Kei-kei (利琪琪)
- Eddie Kwan as Lau Chuen-hang (劉傳亨)
- Anita Lee as Lau Chuen-fong (劉傳芳)
- Oscar Lam as Cheng Sing (鄭勝)
- Mimi Kung as Anita
- Angelina Lo as Cheung Ng (張五)
- Tam Hing-chuen as Lau Kuen (劉權)
- Leung Oi
- Alan Chan
- Tang Yu-chiu
- Ng Pok-kwan
- Chan Yuk-lun
- Cheng Ka-sang
- Leung Siu-chau
- Wong Wai-tak
- Sher Ng
- Kei Siu-kei
- Bak Man-biu
- Wong Hung-kam
- Ng Wah-san
- Chan Kwok-chi
- Wong Yat-fei
- To Siu-chun
- Luk Ying-hong
- Lai Koon-sing
- Kong Ning
- Cheng Kwan-chik
- Yau Kwok-leung
- Karel Wong
- Raymond Tsang
- Ma Chung-tak
- Tsui Kwong-lam
- Chan Kwan-kai
- Lam Chung
- Wayne Lai
- Ng Sui-ting
- Chan Chung-kin
- Clement Poon
- Yeung Chung-yee
- Law Kwok-wai
- Gilbert Lam
- Tsang Yiu-ming
- Wong Yan-chi
- Wong Sing-seung
- Lam Kin-fai
- Evergreen Mak
- Chu Tit-wo
- Tam Siu-ming
- Hui Sat-yin
- Gregory Charles Rivers
- Suen Kwai-hing
- Frankie Lam
- Leung Kin-ping
- Wong Sze-yan
- Tam Yat-ching
- Ling Hon
- Cho Chai
- Yip Sai-kuen
- Ho Pik-kin
- Bobby Au-yeung
- Lee Wong-sang
- Fung Kwok
- Gordon Lam
- Sing Yan
- Law Shu-kei
- Chan Fung-ping
- Sin Po-wah
- Ho Lai-nam
- Tang Yee-ho
- Kenny Wong
- Mak Chi-wan
- Sin Kim-yuen
- Ben Wong
- Wong Ying-kuen

== See also ==
- Donnie Yen filmography
- List of TVB series (1989)
