= Rain in the Heart =

Television Drama show

- Official poster
- 成功路上
- Genre: Drama
- Written by: Lam Siu-chi; Lam So-lan; Chiu Ching-yung; Susan Chan; Yu Chun-pang; Wong Ho-wah; Mak Chi-sing
- Directed by: Jonathan Chik; Tam Lai-yin; Wong Yau-chuen; Chan Wing-cheung; Lam Chi-yan
- Starring: Roger Kwok; Dominic Lam; Kathy Chow; Gallen Lo; Josephine Lam; Winnie Lau
- Theme music composer: George Lam
- Opening theme: Between Success and Failure (成敗之間) by George Lam
- Ending theme: Contradiction (矛盾) by George Lam
- Country of origin: Hong Kong
- Original language: Cantonese
- No. of episodes: 40

Production
- Producer: Leung Choi-yuen
- Production location: Hong Kong
- Camera setup: Multi camera
- Production company: TVB

Original release
- Network: TVB Jade
- Release: 19 February – 13 April 1990

Rain in the Heart
- Traditional Chinese: 成功路上
- Simplified Chinese: 成功路上
- Literal meaning: "In the Road of Success"
Transcriptions
Standard Mandarin
- Hanyu Pinyin: Chéng Gōng Lù Shàng
Yue: Cantonese
- Jyutping: Sing4 Gung4 Lou6 Seong6

Rain in the Heart is a 1990 Hong Kong television serial drama produced by TVB and starring Roger Kwok, Dominic Lam, Kathy Chow and Gallen Lo.

== Plot ==
The series tells the story of three youth who have complications in their work and relationships and how they fight to survive and finally shake hands with each other and proceed to the road of success.

== Cast ==
- Roger Kwok as Lau Ka-wai (劉家偉)
- Dominic Lam as Cheung Shun-pan (張順品)
- Yip Sai-kuen
- Wayne Lai
- Chan Kwok-chi
- Tam Ping-man
- Pak Yan
- Tomi Wong as Chong Lai-seung (莊麗裳)
- Winnie Lau as Cheung Chi-san (張紫珊)
- Liliy Liu
- Lau Siu-wai
- Chan Pui-san
- Chun Hung
- Kong Ming-fai
- Wong Chung-chi
- Ng Sui-ting
- Tsui Kwong-lam
- Kwan Hoi-san as Lau Hing-sing (劉慶成)
- Sin Lin-po
- Siu San-yan
- Wong Sing-seung
- Nam Hung as Lau Suk-chun (劉淑珍)
- Albert Lo
- Wong Man-yee
- Au-yeung Sa-fei
- Stella Wong
- Mui Chi-ching
- Ho Mei-ting as Lee Yuk-yin (李玉賢)
- Leung Po-ching
- Chan Kwan-yung
- Ng Po-kwan
- Lo Tin-wai
- Josephine Lam as Kong Ho-ning (江可寧)
- Gilbert Lam
- Gallen Lo as Chung Man-kit (鐘文傑)
- Lau Wan
- Leung Siu-chau
- Ho Pik-kin
- Wong San
- Shek Wan
- Chan Chung-kin
- Wong Wai
- Lam Yin-ming
- Pamela Peck
- Leung Oi
- Tin Wing-ka
- Cheung Pik-kei
- Chan Yuk-lun
- Leo Tsang
- Lai Koon-sing
- Ling Lai-man
- Kathy Chow as Tung Yiu (童瑤)
- Wong Yat-fei
- Gordon Lam
- Keung Wai-nam
- Hui Sat-yin
- Cheung Ching
- Shally Tsang
- Tam Siu-ming
- Ngan Chiu-hung
- Ting Yan
- Lily Leung
- Benz Hui
- Hau Wai-wan
- Tang Hin-wing
- Mak Ho-wai
- Wu Ying-man
- Steve Lee
- Tam Chuen-hing
- Angelina Lo
- Chan Min-leung
- Wong Ying-yiu
- Yu Mo-lin
- Wan Seung-yin
- Chan Wai-yu
- Ma Siu-fu
- Tam Yat-ching
- Felix Lok as Simon
- Power Chan
- Wong Kin-fung
- Tsang Yiu-ming
- Lee Hin-ming
- Sit Chun
- Sam Tsang
- Hon Chun
- Wong Fung-king
- Lai Hoi-san
- Wong Wai-leung
- Lee Wai-man
- Pang Chun-fai
- Chu Siu-kei
- Lee Wong-sang
- Lee Kwai-ying
- Dickson Lee
- Yip Pik-wan
- Wong Hung-kam
- Lung Hin
- Frankie Lam
- Lee Chung-ning
- Tai Siu-man
- Chow Tin-tak
- Ling Hon
- Bak Man-biu
- Cheng Siu-ping
- Keung Wai-nam
- Chu Sing-choi
- Yan Wah
- Yeung Chi-to
- Ben Wong
- Suen Kwai-hing
- Chan Pui-man
- David Siu

== See also ==
- List of TVB series (1990)
