= The Heavenly Swordsman and the Spoiled =

- VCD cover
- Traditional Chinese: 聖劍天驕
- Simplified Chinese: 圣剑天骄
- Hanyu Pinyin: Shèng Jiàn Tiān Jiāo
- Jyutping: Sing3 Kim3 Tin1 Kiu1
- Genre: Wuxia
- Written by: Cheung Wah-piu
- Directed by: Kuk Kwok-leung
- Starring: Andy Lau; Dicky Cheung; Patricia Chong; Maggie Lee
- Country of origin: Hong Kong
- Original language: Cantonese
- No. of episodes: 3

Production
- Producer: Lee Ting-lun
- Production location: Hong Kong
- Production company: TVB

Original release
- Network: TVB Jade
- Release: 5 January – 19 January 1986

The Heavenly Swordsman and the Spoiled is a 1986 Hong Kong wuxia television miniseries produced by TVB and starring Andy Lau. The 3-episode series originally aired on TVB Jade from 5 to 19 January 1986 on Sundays. For its VCD release, the series was edited together into a television film.

== Plot ==
The Stone Demon (Maggie Lee) vigorously seeks to perfect the Stone Demon Mystical Power and swears to bring suffering to mankind. Wan Pak-ying (Lau Kong), holder of the Immeasurable Sword unsuccessfully attempts to defeat the Stone Demon and was killed by her instead. The Stone Demon adopts Wan's daughter and trains her to become the number one demon star and names her Tung Ying. The Stone Demon has no fear except for Wan's martial junior, Taoist grandmaster Sam-san Kau-hau (Pai Ying) and swears to get rid of him. She is invincible and possesses great martial ability, who can only be taken down by three prodigies marked with seven-star moles on their feet. Therefore, the Stone Demon sends Tung Ying (Patricia Chong) on a mission to kill the three seven-star prodigies. By chance, Ying meets one of the seven-star prodigies, Kei Chun (Andy Lau). Originally intended to kill Chun, Ying finds herself unable to complete her mission after witnessing his heroism and falls in love with him.

Later, Ying was also enlightened by Sam-san Kau-hau and decides to forsake family loyalty for righteousness, and allies with Chun and Ha Hau-fei (Dicky Cheung), another one of the seven-star prodigies, for a series of battles against the Stone Demon.

== Cast ==
- Andy Lau as Kei Chun (祈俊), the main protagonist of the series, a youxia who is one of the three prodigies marked with seven-mole stars on his foot.
- Maggie Lee as The Stone Demon (石魔), the main antagonist of the series.
- Patricia Chong as Tung Ying (童嬰), Wan Pak-ying's daughter who was adopted by the Stone Demon and trained to become the number one demon star.
- Pai Ying as Sam-san Kau-hau (三山九侯), Wan Pak-ying's martial junior who is a Taoist grandmaster.
- Dicky Cheung as Ha Hau-fei (夏侯飛), one of the three prodigies marked with seven-mole stars on his foot.
- Lau Kong as Wan Pak-ying (雲白鷹), holder of the Immeasurable Sword (無量劍).
- Sheung Yee as Granny Fa(花婆婆).
- Soh Hang-suen as the lordess of the Yuen Seung Castle (玄霜堡).
- Hui Kin-pong
- Yang Kai-chi
- Kiki Sheung
- Kam Kwok-wai

== See also ==
- Andy Lau filmography
- List of TVB series (1986)
