= Brothers Under the Skin (disambiguation) =

(The) Brothers Under the Skin may refer to:

- Brothers Under the Skin, a 1922 silent comedy film
- Brothers Under the Skin, a book by Carey McWilliams
- The Brothers Under the Skin, a 1986 TVB series
