= Maggie Chan =

Maggie Chan may refer to:

- Maggie Chan (athlete), Hong Kong long-distance runner
- Maggie Chan (politician), Hong Kong solicitor and politician

== See also ==
- Maggie Chen, Hong Kong-born actress
