= Money and Fame =

Money and Fame or Money & Fame may refer to:

- "Money and Fame", a 1990 song by Scorpions from Crazy World
- "Money & Fame", a 2016 song by Needtobreathe from Hard Love
- Money and Fame (TV series), a 1992 series on TVB
