= Man from Guangdong =

1991 Hong Kong martial arts television series

- Official poster
- 我係黃飛鴻
- Genre: Martial arts
- Screenplay by: Ng Yuk-cheung; Chung Ching-leung; Lee Chan-leung; Lee Tang
- Directed by: Siu Kin-hang; Wan Wai-kei; Wu Ming-hoi; Wong Koon-fai
- Starring: Aaron Kwok; Gary Chan; Joanna Chan; Carrie Ho; Shih Kien; Bowie Wu
- Country of origin: Hong Kong
- Original language: Cantonese
- No. of episodes: 20

Production
- Producer: Siu Sang
- Production location: Hong Kong
- Camera setup: Multi camera
- Production company: TVB

Original release
- Network: TVB Jade
- Release: 14 January – 8 February 1991

Man from Guangdong
- Traditional Chinese: 我係黃飛鴻
- Simplified Chinese: 我系黄飞鸿
- Literal meaning: "I am Wong Fei-hung"
Transcriptions
Standard Mandarin
- Hanyu Pinyin: Wǒ Xì Huáng Fēi Hóng
Yue: Cantonese
- Jyutping: Ngo2 Hai6 Wong4 Fei1 Hung4

Man from Guangdong is a 1991 Hong Kong martial arts television series produced by TVB and tells the story of Leung Kan, portrayed by Aaron Kwok, the fictitious son of famed martial artist Leung Foon, whom was a favored disciple of folk hero Wong Fei-hung, portrayed by Shih Kien. Shih, who portrayed Wong in the series, was known for portraying antagonists in a series of Wong Fei-hung-related films during the 1940s to 1970s, while the series also features Sai Gwa-Pau reprising his role as "Buckteeth So" from the aforementioned series of films.

== Plot ==
Wong Fei-hung (Shih Kien), one of the Ten Tigers of Canton, has passed his prime and decides to close down his martial arts school and clinic, Po Chi Lam. His disciples has scattered to different places and Wong himself decides to retire to Foshan and no longer wants to be involved in the martial world. One while, while playing chess with Kwan Yan-kin (Cheng Gwan-min), they mention Wong's favored disciple, Leung Foon, lamenting his premature death. According to rumors, Leung has descendants that are living. Wong then send his disciple Buckteeth So's (Sai Gwa-Pau) daughter, So Siu-mui (Wu Man-yam) to find the whereabouts that descendant, hoping to teach him his skills and revive the former prestige of Po Chi Lam. Leung Foon had a naturally upright personality and never indulged in romance, but during one night when he got drunk, he had a one-night stand with a showgirl named Koo Kam-fung (Pak Yan). Not long after, Leung was brutally killed by rivals, leaving Kam-fung heartbroken. The pregnant Kam-fung returns to her ancestral home, leaving all her glory behind, and gives birth to her child. As the years flow by, Kam-fung's son, Leung Kan (Aaron Kwok), has grown up and works as a pig breeder for a living. Due to his mother's background, Kan was often given cold stares and ridiculed by others. Kan aspires to make it out to the province one day and study under his grandmaster, Wong Fei-hung, hoping to wash out his past shame. On the other hand, one of Kan's fellow disciples, Law Kam-loi (Gary Chan), who came from a wealthy family, is often bullied by other disciples. Kam-loi is like-minded with Kan and never looked-down upon Kan's background and they develop a brotherly friendship. Kam-loi's father, Law Pak-man (Tin Ching), has prearranged his son to marry with village leader Koo Tin-ho's (Sing Yan) daughter, Ku Yuet-fan (Chan On-ying). However, Yuet-fan has an unruly pungent personality and Kam-loi is disinterested in her so he makes up many excuses to stall the marriage.

== Cast ==
- Aaron Kwok as Leung Kan (梁謹)
- Wu Man-yam as So Siu-mui (蘇小妹)
- Tang Tai-wo as Messenger
- Shih Kien as Wong Fei-hung (黃飛鴻)
- Cheng Gwan-min as Kwan Yan-kin (關仁堅)
- Sai Gwa-Pau as Buckteeth So (牙擦蘇)
- Ma Siu-fu as Tai-kau Sui (大舊水)
- Chan Chi-ho as Sui's underling
- Leung Chun-kit as Sui's underling
- Penny Leung as Sui's underling
- Leung Ka-kit as Sui's underling
- Pak Yan as Koo Kam-fung (古金鳳)
- Gary Chan as Law Kam-loi (羅金來)
- Chan On-ying as Koo Yuet-fan (古月芬)
- Tin Ching as Law Pak-man (羅百萬)
- Leung Po-ching as Wet Nurse Tai (戴奶媽)
- William Chu as Village kid
- Mui Lan as Farmer lady
- Hau Wai-wan as Widow Chan (陳寡婦)
- Chan Fung-ping as Granny Wong (王婆)
- Chu Wai-ming as Village kid
- Sing Yan as Koo Tin-ho (古天河)
- Chan Kin-tak as Thief
- Au Yuk as Owner
- Lee Siu-kei as Ching-chik (正直)
- Wong Man-piu as Waiter #2
- Pang Chun-fai as Waiter #3
- Mak Siu-wah as Mountain thief
- Chung King-po as Mountain thief
- Lai Sau-ying as Tea-selling old lady
- Chow Woon-yin as Old man
- Wong Wai-lam as Passerby
- Yeung Ka-fai as Passerby
- Kwok Chi-kwan as Passerby
- Gregory Charles Rivers as Priest
- Joanna Chan as Yu-yee (如意)
- Lau Chiu-fan as Ping (炳)
- Mui Chi-ching as Passerby
- Ho Chi-ching as Passerby
- Ho Pak-kwong as Hoi-fuk (海福)
- Mak Chi-wan as Keung (阿強)
- Cheng Lui as Airplane Cheung (飛機祥)
- Ma Siu-mang as Tenant
- Chan Min-leung as Fairy Choi (賽神仙)
- Wong Yat-fei as Second uncle Chan (陳二叔)
- Suen Kwai-hing as Old man Lam (林伯)
- Wong Kin-fung as Cheung (阿章)
- Tang Yuk-wing as Western shop owner
- Kwong Cho-fai as Western shop employee
- Cheung Siu as Western shop customer
- Lily Leung as Auntie Lan (蘭姨)
- Cheng Wai-ka as Yim-mui (艷梅)
- Wong Fung-king as Po-fong (寶芳)
- Teresa Ha as Yee-wan (綺雲)
- Leung Oi as Mei-mei (薇薇)
- Tsang Yiu-ming as Brothel boat customer
- Cheung Pak-yin as Brothel boat customer
- Lee Hoi-sang as Ha Hon-yan (哈漢仁)
- Siu San-yan as Adviser Chow (周師爺)
- Leung Siu-chau as Pau (阿豹)
- Kenny Wong as Piu (阿彪)
- Chan Yau-hau as 13th Master (十三少)
- Yu Ming as 8th Master (八少)
- Ma Kin-chung as Beggar #1
- Daniel Kwok as Beggar #2
- Tang Yee-ho as Innkeeper
- Chan Hon-keung as Fighter
- Tang Kai-wing as Fighter
- Cheng Chong-wai as Pier worker
- Lee Hon-sing as Fighter
- Leung Yam-kei as Ha Tai-yung (哈大勇)
- Yung Kai-lai as Waitress
- Mok Yin-seung as Waitress
- Carrie Ho as Siu Kuen-kuen (小娟娟)
- Ling Hon as Uncle Choi (財叔)
- Elton Loo as Crazy Boy (白痴仔)
- Wong Wah-sing as Theatre hawker
- Yuen Hon-po as Clothes hawker
- Yu Mo-lin as Crazy Boy's mother
- Choi Wing-cheung as Brothel boat customer
- Lee Lin-to as Brothel boat customer
- Chan Kim-fai as Brothel boat customer
- Lau Wai-kwok as Brothel boat customer
- Lee Wai-man as Kong Mo Society disciple
- Ho Chun-wah as Ha's underling
- Tam Chun-wai as Rice shop employee
- Ko Yin-fung as Rice shop employee / Po Chi Lam patient
- Law Hung as Rice vault manager
- Tong Ping-kwong as Noodle shop owner
- Mak Shu-san as Cookie shop owner
- Lee Wah-kon as Medicine shop owner
- Wong Kin-san as Leprosy man (麻瘋佬)
- Lee Lung-kei as Wong Chiu-mo (黃超武)
- Lok Hung as Fat Dragon (肥龍)
- Lee Hin-ming as Skinny Tiger (瘦虎)
- Hui Chi-kai as Po Chi Lam disciple
- Wan Tak-keung as Po Chi Lam disciple
- Poon Shu-kei as Po Chi Lam patient
- Cheung Siu as Po Chi Lam patient
- Ma Yiu-seung as Fortune solver
- Wong Sze-yan as Kong Mo Society disciple
- Lee Wai-man as Kong Mo Society disciple
- Tam Yat-ching as Gentleman
- Kong Tak-wah as Beggar
- Lau Wan as Pork Kwai (豬肉貴)
- Pamela Peck as Yap Sam-neung (扈三娘)
- Tang Yu-chiu as Waiter
- Wong Sing-seung as Keeper
- Kan Sui-chiu as Old man
- Yip Sai-kuen as Luk (阿陸)
- Chang Yi as Chuk Kwan (祝昆)
- Yung Sau-yee as Farm lady
- Chow Ngai-ming as Blade shop owner
- Ng Sek-hing as Filthy passerby
- Wong San as Host
- Ng Sui-ting as Siu Sa-yee (小沙彌)
- Tsui San-yee as Fake Fairy Choi (假賽神仙)
- Kong Ngai as Grandpa (公公)
- Ho Man-chun as Clothes shop owner
- Chung Wai-tung as Passerby
- Cheung Kwok-keung as Passerby
- Tsang Kan-wing as Woodman
- Bowie Wu as Clubfoot Seven (腳七)
- Liu Lai-lai as Terre woman
- Yau Kit-ping as Terre woman
- Chan Yuk-ping as Terre woman
- Yu Feng as Brothel madam
- Chan Siu-leung as Sweet soup hawker
- Ho Kwok-ying as Bear fruit hawker
- Chan Yin-hong as Prostitute #1
- Fong Wai-kei as Prostitute #2
- Chan Wai-yu as Mang Po (孟婆)
- Mak Siu-wah as Strong man
- Lau Kwai-fong as Village woman
- Ling Lai-man as Fellow Chan (陳父老)
- Lau Siu-cheung as Storyteller
- Hau Chun-yu as Street kid
- Lai Yuen-san as Street kid
- Ho Pik-kin as Fortune solver
- Au Chi-ho as Passerby
- Chan Kam-man as Strong man
- Cheng Chi as Strong man
- Choi Woon-yiu as Strong man
- Chow Ngai-ming as Keeper
- Chow Sai-leung as Strong man
- Fung Chi-kin as Strong man
- Chan Hon-man as Strong man
- Wong Kin-fung as Cheung (阿章)
- Shek Wan as Proprietor
- Leung Lok-yee as Yuk (玉)
- Fung Sui-chun as Yuk's mother
- Helen Ma as Single-eyed Ying (單眼英)
- Wong Wai-lam as Mobster #1
- Wong Wai-leung as Mobster #2
- Au Chi-hung as 2nd Master (二爺)
- Nishikawa Chiaki as Young girl
- Lam Wah-fan as Villager
- Hui Cheung-lung as Villager
- Leung Hung as Congee shop owner
- Hui Kin-shun as Old Yung (老翁)
- Hakusan Yukiko as Young girl
- Wu Fong-ling as Matchmaker
- Lui Kim-kwong as Elderly Mr. Chan (陳老爺)
- Luk Ying-hong as Cheung (阿祥)
- Fong Kit as Ching (阿正)

== See also ==
- Aaron Kwok filmography
- Wong Fei-hung filmography
- List of TVB series (1991)
