= New Heavenly Sword and Dragon Sabre =

1986 Hong Kong TV series

- Hong Kong VCD cover art
- Also known as: The Heaven Sword and Dragon Saber
- 倚天屠龍記
- Genre: Wuxia
- Based on: The Heaven Sword and Dragon Saber by Jin Yong
- Screenplay by: Kwan Chin-bok; Lo Hon-wah; Tang Wai-ling; Lee Yin-ping; Lau Bak-nung
- Directed by: Johnnie To; Fung Pak-yuen; Benny Chan; Ng Chun-shing; Nelson Cheung; Wong Kam-tin
- Starring: Tony Leung; Sheren Tang; Kitty Lai; Maggie Shiu; Carol Cheng; Simon Yam; Kenneth Tsang
- Theme music composer: Michael Lai
- Opening theme: "Who is Here, Accompanied by a Sword" (劍伴誰在) by Tony Leung and Anita Mui
- Country of origin: Hong Kong
- Original language: Cantonese
- No. of episodes: 40 (list of episodes)

Production
- Producer: Wong Tin-lam
- Production location: Hong Kong
- Editor: Tam Ling
- Running time: ≈42 minutes per episode
- Production company: TVB

Original release
- Network: TVB Jade
- Release: 3 November – 30 December 1986

Related
- The Return of the Condor Heroes (1983–1984)

New Heavenly Sword and Dragon Sabre (倚天屠龍記) is a 1986 Hong Kong wuxia television series adapted from the novel The Heaven Sword and Dragon Saber by Jin Yong. First broadcast on TVB Jade in Hong Kong, this series starred Tony Leung, Kitty Lai, and Sheren Tang in the lead roles.

== Cast ==
- Tony Leung as Zhang Wuji
- Kitty Lai as Zhao Min
- Sheren Tang as Zhou Zhiruo
- Maggie Shiu as Xiaozhao
- Simon Yam as Zhang Cuishan
- Carol Cheng as Yin Susu
- Chan On-ying as Yin Li
- Kenneth Tsang as Xie Xun
- Lau Kong as Cheng Kun
- Bau Fong as Zhang Sanfeng
  - Wong Shu-kei as Zhang Sanfeng (young)
- Wong Wan-choi as Song Yuanqiao
- Ho Shu-wing as Song Qingshu
- Lung Tin-sang as Yu Lianzhou
- Liu Kai-chi as Yu Daiyan
- Wilson Tsui as Zhang Songxi
- Toi Chi-wai as Yin Liting
- Lee Shu-kah as Mo Shenggu
- Newton Lai as Yang Xiao
- Michael Tao as Fan Yao
- Ng Hin-wai as Yang Buhui
- Amy Hu as Daiqisi
- Lam Tin as Yin Tianzheng
- Cheung Lui as Yin Yewang
- Benz Hui as Wei Yixiao
- Chun Hung as Shuobude
- Chun Wong as Zhou Dian
- Mak Tsi-wan as Leng Qian
- Tsang Wai-ming as Peng Yingyu
- Leung Hung-wah as Chang Yuchun
- Forest Chan as Xu Da
- Mak Ho-wai as Zhu Yuanzhang
- Wong Sun as Chaghan Temur
- Fung Kok as Wang Baobao
- Kwan Hoi-san as Hu Qingniu
- Yan Pak as Wang Nangu
- Lee Heung-kam as Miejue
- Yung Wai-man as Ji Xiaofu
- Wong Man-yee as Ding Minjun
- Law Lan as Jingxuan
- Leung Ngoi as Jingjia
- Chu Tit-wo as Bai Guishou
- Margie Tsang as Guo Xiang
- Eddy Ko as Jueyuan
- Kiu Hung as Wuse
- Luk Ying-hong as Kongxing
- Cheung Ying-choi as Kongwen
- Ho Bik-kin as Kongzhi
- Sit Chun-kei as Kongxiang
- Tam Chuen-hing as Yuanyin
- Lau Siu-ming as Yang Dingtian
- Ng Kar-lai as Yang Dingtian's wife
- Lau Dan as He Taichong
- Ko Miu-see as Ban Shuxian
- Lee Sing-cheung as He Zudao
- Hui Yat-wah as Wei Siniang
- So Hon-sang as Chang Jingzhi
- Chan Kwok-kuen as Zong Weixia
- Cheng Fan-sang as Lu Zhangke
- Chu Kong as He Biweng
- Wayne Lai as General Ha
- Chan Wing-chun as Han Qianye
- Ho Kwai-lam as Chen Youliang
- Shallin Tse as the Yellow Dress Maiden
- Tam Bing-man as Zhu Changling
- Lau Bik-yee as Zhu Jiuzhen
- Yip Tin-hang as Wu Lie
- Tsang Wai-wan as Wu Qingying
- Kwan Cheuk-yuen as Wei Bi
- Wong Yat-fei as Yao Qingquan
- Felix Lok as Du Dajin
- Wun Chuen as Shi Huolong
