= I Love Amy =

South Korean manhwa series

- South Korean cover for Volume 1

나는 에이미를 사랑해 RR: Naneun Eimireul saranghae MR: Nanŭn Eimirŭl saranghae
- Genre: Romantic comedy, Psychological drama, girls' love
- Author: Unni
- Publisher: PeanuToon (defunct); Bomtoon (current)
- English publisher: Tappytoon; Ize Press
- Original run: January 26, 2022 – June 7, 2023
- Volumes: 4

I Love Amy (Korean: 나는 에이미를 사랑해) is a South Korean girls' love manhwa series created by Unni. The manhwa was serialized online via PeanuToon from January, 2022 to June, 2023. The story follows Amy as she tries to help Bibi with her new obsessive crush on a popular boy at school, all the while developing feelings for Bibi.

== Plot ==
Beatrice "Bibi" Reden is a troublemaker obsessed with one of the most popular boys at school, Peter. One day, Bibi notices Peter speaking with a timid girl, Amy Lee. Bibi invites Amy to her house to get rid of her, but ends up feeling a connection with her instead. The two decide to become friends on the condition that Amy helps Bibi confess her feelings to Peter. As the story continues, Bibi begins to develop obsessive feelings for Amy which later on turn into something more genuine. The story focuses on the character development of both Bibi and Amy and explores their difficulties with platonic and romantic relationships.

== Characters ==
Beatrice Reden
A troublemaker obsessed with Peter, a popular student. She befriends Amy to become closer to Peter, but her feelings begin to develop for someone else overtime.

Amy Lee
A timid girl who becomes friends with Bibi and helps her prepare to confess to Peter, but their friendship gradually becomes more complicated.

Peter Dales
One of the most popular students in school. He is Bibi's initial romantic interest.

Camilla Connor
Amy's childhood friend.

Joy Park
Amy's aunt and guardian.

== Publication ==
Written and illustrated by Unni, I Love Amy, was serialized online via PeanuToon from January 26, 2022, to June 7, 2023. Following PeanuToon's platform shutting down on February 28, 2025 I Love Amy moved to Bomtoon on April 3, 2025. On May 7, 2024, A.Tempo Media launched a crowdfunding campaign on Tumblbug to fund the publication of two print volumes. A second campaign was launched on April 9, 2025, for the final two volumes.

The manhwa was first published digitally in English by Tappytoon. During their panel at Sakura-Con 2025, Yen Press announced that they had licensed the series for an English print publication under their Ize Press imprint, marking the first girls' love release for the imprint.

No.	Original release date	Original ISBN	English release date	English ISBN
1	July 8, 2024	9791169637121	November 18, 2025	9798400904141
2	July 8, 2024	9791169637138	May 19, 2026	9798400904226
3	June 30, 2025	9791173042393	August 18, 2026	9798400904240
4	June 30, 2025	9791173042409	December 8, 2026	9798400904264

== Reception ==
I Love Amy won PeanuToon's "GL of the Year" award for 2023.
