= 1998 RTHK Top 10 Gold Songs Awards =

Hong Kong music awards ceremony

The 1998 RTHK Top 10 Gold Songs Awards (Chinese: 第二十一屆十大中文金曲頒獎音樂會) was held in 1999 for the 1998 music season.

== Top 10 song awards ==
The top 10 songs (十大中文金曲) of 1998 are as follows.

Song name in Chinese	Artist	Composer	Lyricist
甲乙丙丁	Andy Hui Jacky Cheung Ronald Cheng	Mark Lui	Lai man-ting (厲曼婷)
情誡	Faye Wong	Adrian Chan	Albert Leung
唱這歌	Aaron Kwok	Davy Tam (譚國政)	Siu mei (小美)
二人行，一日後	Andy Hui	Mark Lui	Albert Leung
天下無雙	Eason Chan	Lau chung-yin (柳重言)	Richard Lam
越吻越傷心	William So	Eddie Ng Kwok King	Albert Leung
我這樣愛你	Leon Lai	Choi Sun Wo	Albert Leung
親密關係	Sammi Cheng	Eddie Ng Kwok King	Wyman Wong
你是我的女人	Andy Lau	Kenny G T.K.Chan; Walter Afanasieff	Andy Lau
頭髮亂了	Jacky Cheung	Park Jin Young	Wyman Wong

== Other awards ==
Award	Song or album (if available)	Recipient
Top 10 outstanding artists award (十大優秀流行歌手大獎)	–	William So, Andy Lau, Sammi Cheng, Leon Lai, Aaron Kwok, A-mei, Andy Hui, Kelly Chen, Jacky Cheung, Faye Wong
Best new prospect award (最有前途新人獎)	–	(gold) Lillian Ho (何嘉莉) (silver) Grace Ip (葉佩雯) (bronze) Dick and Cowboy
Best original creation song award (最佳原創歌曲獎)	陪你飛	Ekin Cheng
Best revision song award (最佳改編歌曲獎)	心太軟	Kelly Chen
Outstanding Mandarin song award (優秀國語歌曲獎)	(gold) 笨小孩 (silver) 牽手 (bronze) 對面的女孩看過來	Andy Lau A-mei Ah Niu
Sales award (全年最高銷量歌手大獎)	–	Andy Lau, Sammi Cheng, Leon Lai, Aaron Kwok, Jacky Cheung
Sales champion award (全年最高銷量冠軍歌手大獎)	–	Jacky Cheung
Leap award for male singer (飛躍大獎)	–	(gold) William So (silver) Eason Chan (bronze) Nicholas Tse
Leap award for female singer (飛躍大獎)	–	(gold) A-mei (silver) Miriam Yeung (bronze) Gigi Leung
International Chinese award (全球華人至尊金曲)	越吻越傷心	William So
International most popular Chinese award (全球華人最受歡迎歌手獎)	–	Aaron Kwok, Faye Wong
Four channel award (四台聯頒獎項)	–	Andy Lau, Eddie Ng Kwok King, Albert Leung
RTHK Golden needle award (金針獎)	–	Anita Mui
