= Behind Silk Curtains =

Hong Kong drama television series

- VCD cover
- 大都會
- Genre: Drama
- Written by: Susan Chan; Tsang Suk-kuen
- Directed by: Sung Ho-fai; Lee Lik-chi
- Starring: Adam Cheng; Liza Wang; Tony Leung; Stephen Chow; Ray Lui; Peter Yang; Jaime Chik; Carina Lau; Chingmy Yau
- Country of origin: Hong Kong
- Original language: Cantonese
- No. of episodes: 5

Production
- Producer: Lau Kar-ho
- Production location: Hong Kong
- Camera setup: Multi camera
- Production company: TVB

Original release
- Network: TVB Jade
- Release: April 11 – April 15, 1988

Behind Silk Curtains
- Traditional Chinese: 大都會
- Simplified Chinese: 大都会
- Literal meaning: "Metropolis"
Transcriptions
Standard Mandarin
- Hanyu Pinyin: Dà Dōu Huì
Yue: Cantonese
- Jyutping: Daai6 Dou1 Wui6

Behind Silk Curtains is a 1988 Hong Kong grand production serial drama produced by TVB featuring an ensemble cast from the TV station including veteran actors Adam Cheng, Liza Wang, Ray Lui and future award-winning cinematic stars Tony Leung Chiu-Wai and Stephen Chow.

== Plot ==
Wealthy businessman Ling Hin-kwong's (Peter Yang) "Tai Fook Company" is in the verge of collapse and his daughter Ling Ka-man (Liza Wang) persuades him to let Cheng Sai-cheung (Adam Cheng), chairman of the People's Bank, to join the shares. Kwong thinks Man is too ambitious and cannot trust her, so he finds a solution with his son Ling Ka-yip (Tony Leung Chiu-Wai), who recently returned from the United States. However, Yip dies in a car accident, where Kwong suffers bereavement, while also oppressed by Cheung, finally declares bankruptcy. When Ling Ka-man and Cheng Sai-cheung's plan of annexing Tai Fook fell through, in order to develop her career, Man induces Lam Ling-chi (Jaime Chik) to leave Cheung, while Man marries with Cheung.

Cheng Sai-cheung's son Cheng Lap-kei (Stephen Chow) marries with the daughter of the People's Bank's boss, who has a son Ho-yin (Leung Sze-ho) with her ex-husband. Cheung is his sister in-law Yee-chu (Wing Lam) and Ho-yin's settlor, and takes advantage of Ho-yin's decision-making power in the bank to reap profits. Ling Hin-kwong's youngest son Ling Ka-ming (David Siu) marries Yee-chu. Cheung fears the two will vie for property, so he conspires with Ming's ex-girlfriend Maggie (Money Lo) to destroy their relationship. When Ming learns of Cheung's scheme, he searches for evidence of Cheung and his son Kei's embezzlement. In order to cover up his crimes, Cheung mistakenly kills his partner To Ming (Ray Lui).

== Cast ==
- Adam Cheng
- Liza Wang
- Tony Leung
- Stephen Chow
- Ray Lui
- Peter Yang
- Jaime Chik
- Carina Lau
- Chingmy Yau
- David Siu
- Wing Lam
- Money Lo
- Elliot Ngok
- Spencer Leung
- Pauline Yeung
- Elizabeth Lee
- Seung Yee
- Ng Yuen-yee
- Kitty Lai
- Frankie Lam
- Chung Sai-kuen
- Kong Wing-fai
- Yip Pik-wan
- Lau Sau-ping
- Cho Tak-kin
- Wong Wan-choi
- Liu Kai-chi
- Eddie Kwan
- Eugina Lau
- Leung Siu-chau
- Wong San
- Tsui Po-lun
- Ling Lai-man
- Lau On-kei
- Lo Hoi-pang
- Deric Wan
- Tam Chuen-ming
- Gallen Lo
- Benz Hui
- Roger Kwok
- Leung Kin-ping
- Law Ching-ho
- Ho Mei-ting
- Chan Yuk-lun
- Lam Fan
- Kwan Ching
- Yu Mo-lin
- Mui Lan
- Hui Yat-wah
- Lam Mei-kwan
- Eddy Ko
- Kwan Hoi-san
- Leung Hung-wah
- Evergreen Mak
- Tsui Ka-po
- Lee Chung-ning
- Chan Kwok-chi
- Cutie Mui
- Yeung Kai-fong
- Lee Heung-kam
- Johnny Ngan
- Chan Yau-hau
- Pak Lan
- Kong Ning
- Chan Chung-kin
- Ho Wai-lung
- Kong Ngai
- Ng Man-tat
- Sit Chun
