= Alex To =

Hong Kong singer and actor

Alex To 杜德偉
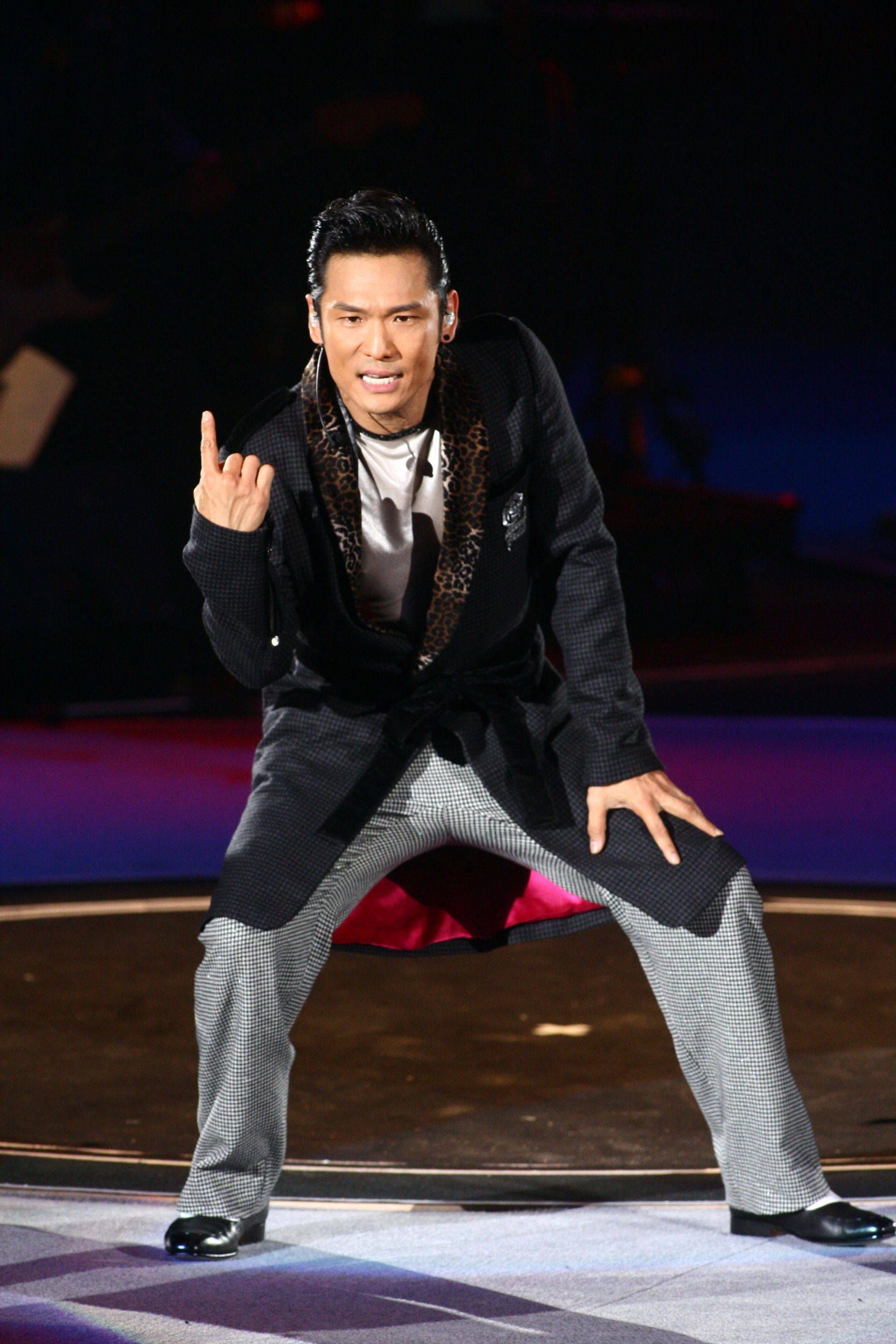
- To performing in 2010
- Born: Alejandro Delfino; 10 February 1962 (age 64); British Hong Kong
- Occupations: Singer; actor
- Years active: 1985–present
- Spouse: Ice Lee (m. 2012)
- Children: 1
- Awards: 15th Global Chinese Music Award Honorary award New Talent Singing Awards – 1985 Winner

Chinese name
- Traditional Chinese: 杜德偉
- Simplified Chinese: 杜德伟
Transcriptions
Standard Mandarin
- Hanyu Pinyin: du4 de2 wei3
- Musical career
- Also known as: To Tak-wai
- Origin: Hong Kong
- Genres: Cantopop, Mandopop, R&B
- Instruments: Vocals, guitar, cello
- Label: Rock Records
- Website: alexto.hk

Alex To (born Alejandro Delfino on 10 February 1962) is a Hong Kong and Taiwan-based singer and actor. He is the winner of the 4th annual New Talent Singing Awards in 1985. He has released numerous albums throughout his career and mainly has R&B influenced songs.

== Early life and career ==
Alex To was born and raised in Hong Kong to a Filipino singer father Ollie Delfino and the Chinese singer Chang Loo. To's mother had emigrated from Shanghai in 1952 after the communists had outlawed popular music. In 1980, at the age of 18, he studied abroad in Vancouver, British Columbia, Canada majoring in commercial design. In 1985, at age 23, he graduated from university and worked as an Art Director back in Hong Kong. That same year, he entered the 4th annual New Talent Singing Awards and won first place (the Gold Award). He was then signed to Capital Artists and began his career in the music industry. His debut Cantonese album 只想留下 was released in 1986. His first Mandarin album 談情說愛 was released in 1990 in Taiwan. In 1987, he also met and spent time with Michael Jackson during his visit to Hong Kong. After 2009, To paid for 1:1 copper statue of Jackson and placed in Shan Yuan Temple, located in Tuen Mun, Hong Kong, it still exists.

== Personal life ==
To married Shanghai-born Ice Lee (李曉冰), a photographer and filmmaker, on 11 November 2012. Their son, Alex Junior (AJ), was born on 2 October 2016.

== Discography ==
=== Cantonese ===
1. 華星新秀新節奏 (July 1986)
2. 只想留下 (April 1987)
3. 等待黎明 (November 1987)
4. 等待黎明Remix版 (1988)
5. Alex To Anima (June 1988)
6. 忘情號 (November 1988)
7. One More Night (November 1989)
8. One Day in My Life (August 1990)
9. Day and Night (1990)
10. 再續情緣精選 (March 1991)
11. 天生喜歡你 (July 1991)
12. 讓自己快樂 (January 1992)
13. 拯救地球精選 (1992)
14. 最愛17首 (1992)
15. 准我再一次 (20 April 1993)
16. 准我·自我 (5 November 1993)
17. 未變過 (8 September 1994)
18. 再次准我自我精選 (1994)
19. 再次准我自我MD精選 (1994)
20. To Teao (2004)

== Filmography ==
=== Film ===
- Sons of the Neon Night (2026)
- Ciao UFO (2019)
- My Wife Is a Superstar (2016)
- Golden Chicken 3 (2014)
- Black & White (2012)
- One Stone Two Birds 3 (2006)
- One Stone Two Birds 2 (2006)
- Fate Fighter (2003)
- The Irresistible Piggies (2002)
- Hit Team (2001)
- Skyline Cruisers (2000)
- The Wedding Days (1997)
- Tonight Nobody Goes Home (1996)
- Heaven Can't Wait (1995)
- Rumble in the Bronx (1995)
- Mack the Knife (1995)
- The Inspector Wears Skirts (1988)

=== Television series ===
- Die Sterntaler (CTV, 2012)
- Decent Women (JXTV, 2011)
- Angel Lover (StarTV, 2006)
- Engagement for Love (TTV, 2006)
- Love Concierge (Mediacorp, 2005)
- Iron Fisted Drifter (2004)
- Dance of the Heart (2004)
- The Pawnshop No. 8 (2003)
- The Turbulent Decade (TVB 1986)

=== Variety and reality show ===
Year	English title	Chinese title	Notes
2022	Call Me by Fire	披荊斬棘	Season 2
