= Anita Lee =

Hong Kong singer

- 李婉華
- Born: 21 May 1968 (age 58); British Hong Kong

Anita Lee Yuen Wah (Chinese: 李婉華; born 21 May 1968) is a Hong Kong-Canadian actress, radio host, advocate for human rights, and YouTuber.

== Biography ==
She attended Yaumati Catholic Primary School and Pentecostal School.

In 1986, she was admitted to the Hong Kong Academy for Performing Arts. She later dropped out because she was recruited by TVB to become an actress. She starred in more than 100 television series and movies in Hong Kong and Taiwan.

After she moved to Canada, she became a radio host and worked for CJVB for 15 years. During the Hong Kong anti-extradition bill protests, her radio programme was abruptly cancelled. It was speculated that she was dismissed because she had aired the song "Glory to Hong Kong".

In September 2020, Lee started her own YouTube channel, named "移加李婉華".

== Personal life ==
Lee met a Canadian businessman Leo Lee in 2001, and got married in Canada. She gave birth to a daughter in 2003 and twin sons in 2009.

== Filmography ==
=== Film ===
Year	Title	Role
1993	Perfect Exchange	Mona
1993	He Ain't Heavy, He's My Father	Kan
1996	King of Robbery	Fan

=== Television ===
Year	Title	Role	Notes
1989	Flying Squads	Lau Chuen-fong	
1991–1992	Family Squad		
2000–2001	Master Ma	Duan Lengcui	
2018	Another Era	Karen	
