= Jacqueline Law =

Hong Kong actress (1966–2012)

- 羅慧娟
- Born: October 10, 1966; British Hong Kong
- Died: June 30, 2012 (aged 45); Singapore
- Occupation: Actress
- Years active: 1987–2010
- Spouse: Liu Chee Ming (m. 2008)
- Family: Law Wai-Ping (brother)

Jacqueline Law (Chinese: 羅慧娟) (October 10, 1966 – June 30, 2012) was a Hong Kong television and film actress.

== Background ==
Law's older brother Law Wai-ping was an actor for TVB during the 1980s. In 1987, Law launched her own acting career at the age of 17. Despite her lack of professional acting experience at the time, Law was cast in a lead role in the 1987 Hong Kong television series The Legend of the Book and the Sword. She portrayed Fok-ching-tung in the series, a television adaptation of Louis Cha's The Book and the Sword, which marked her first dramatic role.

Law was next cast in A Friend in Need, which co-starred Jaime Chik, Simon Yam, and Leon Lai.

Law dated Singaporean magnate and businessman Liu Chee Ming for eleven years. The couple married in 2008.

Her diagnosis with pancreatic cancer led to her retirement from acting. Law held a farewell party in February 2012 before moving to Singapore with her husband for treatment. Guests, composed of twenty friends, included actresses Kitty Lai, Sheren Tang, and Monica Chan. Law died at her home of pancreatic cancer in Singapore on June 30, 2012, at the age of 45. Her remains were buried in Pok Fu Lam Columbarium.
