= Pauline Yeung =

Hong Kong actress (born 1967)

Pauline Yeung Po-ling (Chinese: 楊寶玲) (born April 17, 1967) is a Hong Kong actress and beauty pageant titleholder who won the 1987 Miss Hong Kong Pageant and did well in other international pageants too. She was born in Hong Kong with ancestry in Dongguan, Guangdong, China. She graduated from Diocesan Girls' School, one of the top schools in Hong Kong, then further her studies in the UK.

== Pageantry ==
Yeung won the 1987 Miss Hong Kong Pageant, and went on to compete at the 1987 Miss World pageant, where she was placed amongst the top 12 semi-finalists and went on to win the Continental Queen of Asia award. She later participated in the 1988 Miss Universe pageant. She entered the semi-finals in 6th place, and was crowned the fourth runner-up in the final. Porntip Nakhirunkanok of Thailand was crowned Miss Universe that year. To date, Yeung is the only Miss Hong Kong to participate at both Miss World and Miss Universe pageants, and she has had the best performance in international pageants.

== Career ==
Her first movie Dragons Forever, in which she played Jackie Chan's character's girlfriend, was released in 1988, and it was a big hit. She later wrote 5 books on beauty and fitness, which all became top sellers in Hong Kong.

She is also the co-founder of Lukfook Jewellery, which became a listed company in 1997, and now has over 1,500 stores worldwide. She has been a director on the board since the beginning. She is also a GIA diamond graduate, and has designed jewelry for her own company.

== Personal life ==
After she married Nelson Wong, the President of Far East Marketing of MGM Resorts in 2002, she moved to the United States and she became a mother at the age of 40. She divorced after 12 years of marriage and later remarried in 2015.

== Filmography ==
Year	Title	Role	Notes
1988	Dragons Forever	Nancy Lee	
1989	How to Be a Millionaire... Without Really Trying	Ping	
1989	The Gods and Demons of Zu Mountain	Sik Lei-Kei	15 episodes
1989	Dream of Desire	Pauline	
1990	Happy Ghost 4	Annie	
1991	Holy Virgin vs the Evil Dead	Princess White	
1991	The Banquet	Banquet Guest	
1992	Battle Field in Hell		
1993	Even Mountains Meet	Dilu	
1994	Kidnap		
1994	ong chuang er meng	Lady's friend	
1997	All's Well, Ends Well 1997	Herself	
1998	B for Boy		

Awards and achievements
Preceded by (Puerto Rico) Laurie Simpson	Miss Universe 4th Runner-Up; 1988	Succeeded by (Mexico) Adriana Abascal
