= Cally Kwong =

Hong Kong singer (born 1962)

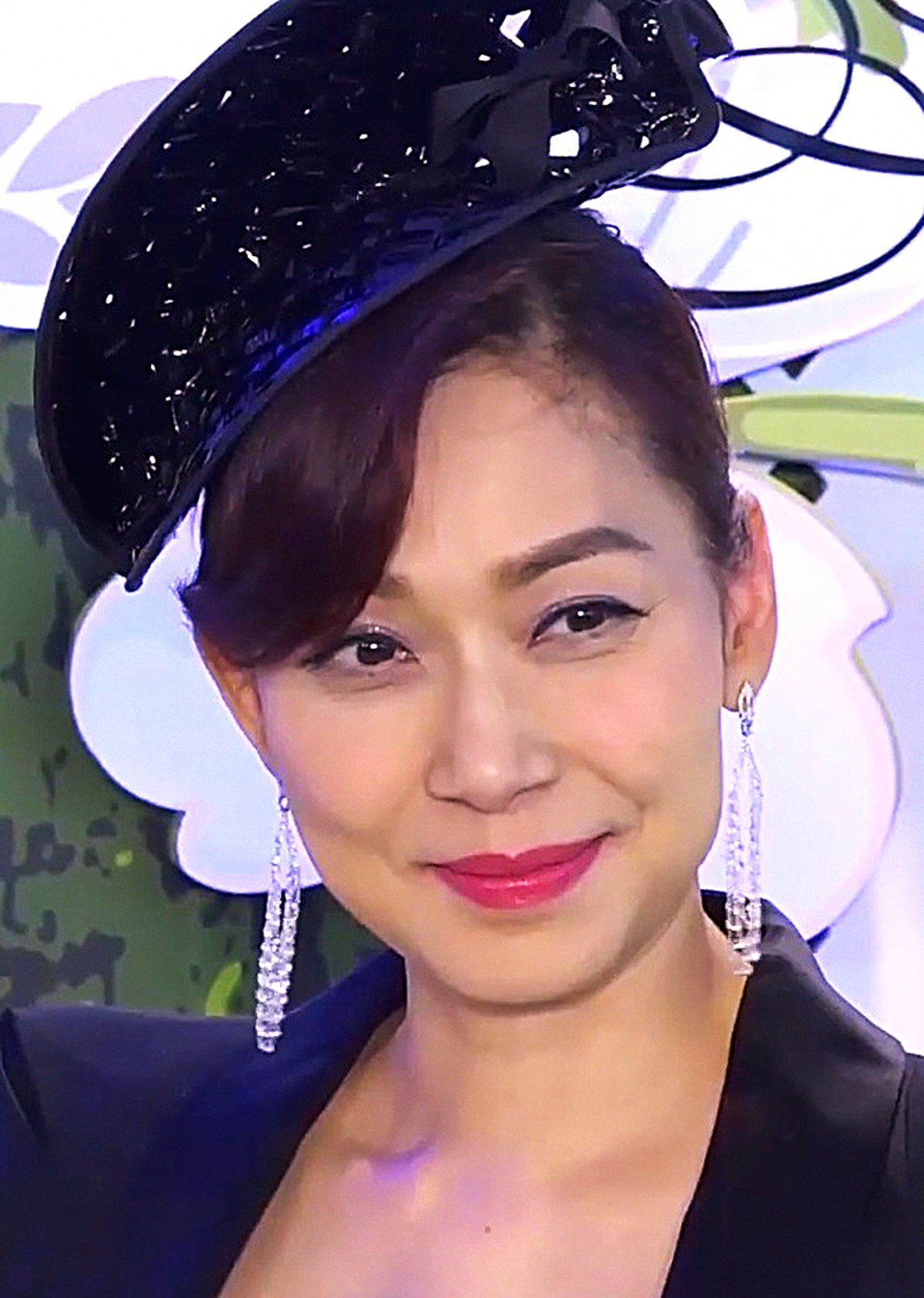
- Kwong in 2018
- Born: 24 December 1962 (age 63); British Hong Kong
- Occupation: Singer
- Years active: 1982-present
- Spouse: Ray Lui (m. 1996; div. 1997)

Chinese name
- Traditional Chinese: 鄺美雲
- Simplified Chinese: 邝美云
Transcriptions
Standard Mandarin
- Hanyu Pinyin: Kuàng Měiyún
- Bopomofo: ㄎㄨㄤˋ ㄇㄟˇㄩㄣˊ
- Gwoyeu Romatzyh: Kuanq Meeiyun
- Wade–Giles: K’uang^{4} Mei^{3}-yün^{2}
Yue: Cantonese
- Yale Romanization: Kwong Méih Wàhn
- Sidney Lau: Kwong^{3} Mei^{5} Wan^{4}
- Canton Romanization: Kuong^{3} Méi^{5} Wen^{4}

Cally Kwong Mei-wan (born 24 December 1962) is a Hong Kong singer. She entered the entertainment industry through the 1982 Miss Hong Kong beauty pageant as the first runner-up. She has been a member of the National People's Congress since 2017.

== Early life ==
Kwong was born Cally Kwong Mei Wan on 24 December 1962 in British Hong Kong. Her family was poor and her mother died when she was 14.

== Career ==
Cally entered the Miss Hong Kong contest organised by HK TVB in 1982 when she was 19 and won the 1st runner-up title. The Miss Hong Kong of that year was Anglie Leon Leung (Chinese: 梁韻蕊) and the 2nd runner-up was Isabella Kau (Chinese: 寇鴻萍). As the 1st runner-up, Cally represented Hong Kong in the 32nd edition of the Miss World contest in 1982. Her contestant number was 29 out of 68. The event was held on 18 November 1982 at the Royal Albert Hall in London, UK.

She later became a cantopop singer. In 1984, she signed up to PolyGram Records and released her first solo album a year later. She later became the Cantonese Singing voice for Ariel.

She started jewelry studies and obtained a diploma in gemology and in 2000, she opened her own store, Cally Jewellery.

== Political career ==
Kwong started her charity work back in early 1990s. Because of her contribution to Jiangxi province, she was elected as delegate to the 9th and 10th Jiangxi CPPCC (Chinese People's Political Consultative Conference). She was elected as one of the 36 deputies representing Hong Kong in China's National People's Congress in Dec 2017.

== Personal life ==
In 1996, Kwong married actor Ray Lui Leung-wai, however the marriage lasted only 18 months.

In 2000, Kwong became a Buddhist and joined the Fo Guang Shan (Mountain of Buddhist Light) (佛光山 )whose headquarters is near Kaohsiung in the south of Taiwan. Since then, she adopted her religious principles in her investments.

From 2000, Cally started to donate in China, mostly in Jiangxi province in building primary and secondary schools for the poor. Her goal was to build 100 schools. In 2008, she was named one of the top ten philanthropists in Jiangxi.

== See also ==
- Miss Hong Kong Pageant
