= Charlene Tse =

Hong Kong–based Chinese actress

- Born: October 9, 1963 (age 62); Guangzhou, China
- Occupations: Actress; tele-movie director
- Years active: 1985–1991
- Spouse(s): John Shum (1991–2005); Wong Wai-tak (2010–present)

Chinese name
- Traditional Chinese: 謝寧
- Simplified Chinese: 谢宁
Transcriptions
Standard Mandarin
- Hanyu Pinyin: Xiè Níng
- Musical career
- Also known as: Tse Ning; Shallin Tse

Charlene Tse Ning (born October 9, 1963, in Guangzhou, China), also known as Shallin Tse, is a Hong Kong–based Chinese actress. A Hakka, she is the winner of the 1985 Miss Hong Kong Pageant. She has acted in numerous television series produced by Hong Kong's TVB.

== Filmography ==
=== TV series ===
- New Heavenly Sword and Dragon Sabre (1986)
- Genghis Khan (1987)
- The Foundling Progress (1987)
- Two Most Honorable Knights (1988)
- The Sword and the Sabre (1989)
- Deadly Secret (1989)

Achievements
Preceded by Joyce Godenzi	Miss Hong Kong; 1985	Next: Robin Lee
