= Maggie Chen =

Hong Kong-born Chinese actress

- Traditional Chinese: 陳美琪
- Simplified Chinese: 陈美琪
Transcriptions
Standard Mandarin
- Hanyu Pinyin: Chén Měiqí
Yue: Cantonese
- Jyutping: Can4 Mei5 Kei4

Birth name
- Traditional Chinese: 陳文俊
- Simplified Chinese: 陈文俊
Transcriptions
Standard Mandarin
- Hanyu Pinyin: Chén Wénjùn
Yue: Cantonese
- Jyutping: Can4 Man4 Zeon3

Maggie Chen (born Chen Wenjun; 24 September 1955) is a Hong Kong-born Chinese actress known for her role as Xiaoqing in the TV series New Legend of Madame White Snake and other roles in movies such as Supercop 2.

She is also a philanthropist, polyglot, an author, and a singer-songwriter. She has written and performed her own songs such as "Luo Min Ye" (落玟恋) and the movie song "Qing Si Qian Wo Xin" (情丝牵我心). She has written the books "Wo de Yeman Jimu" (我的野蛮继母) and "Yi Shuang Fei Wang Guangming de Chibang" (一双飞往光明的翅膀). She is proficient in Japanese, French, English, Cantonese, and Mandarin.

Outside the entertainment industry, she is known for her volunteer work and role as a public education figure. Because of her decades of charity work, she has become known as the "mother of angels."

She attended the University of Macau, graduating in 1987 with an MBA. In 1999, she married a Chinese-American businessman named Xin Shangyong (忻尚永), and in 2008 they adopted a daughter from Shanxi named Lucia.
