= David Siu =

Hong Kong actor

David Siu Chung-hang
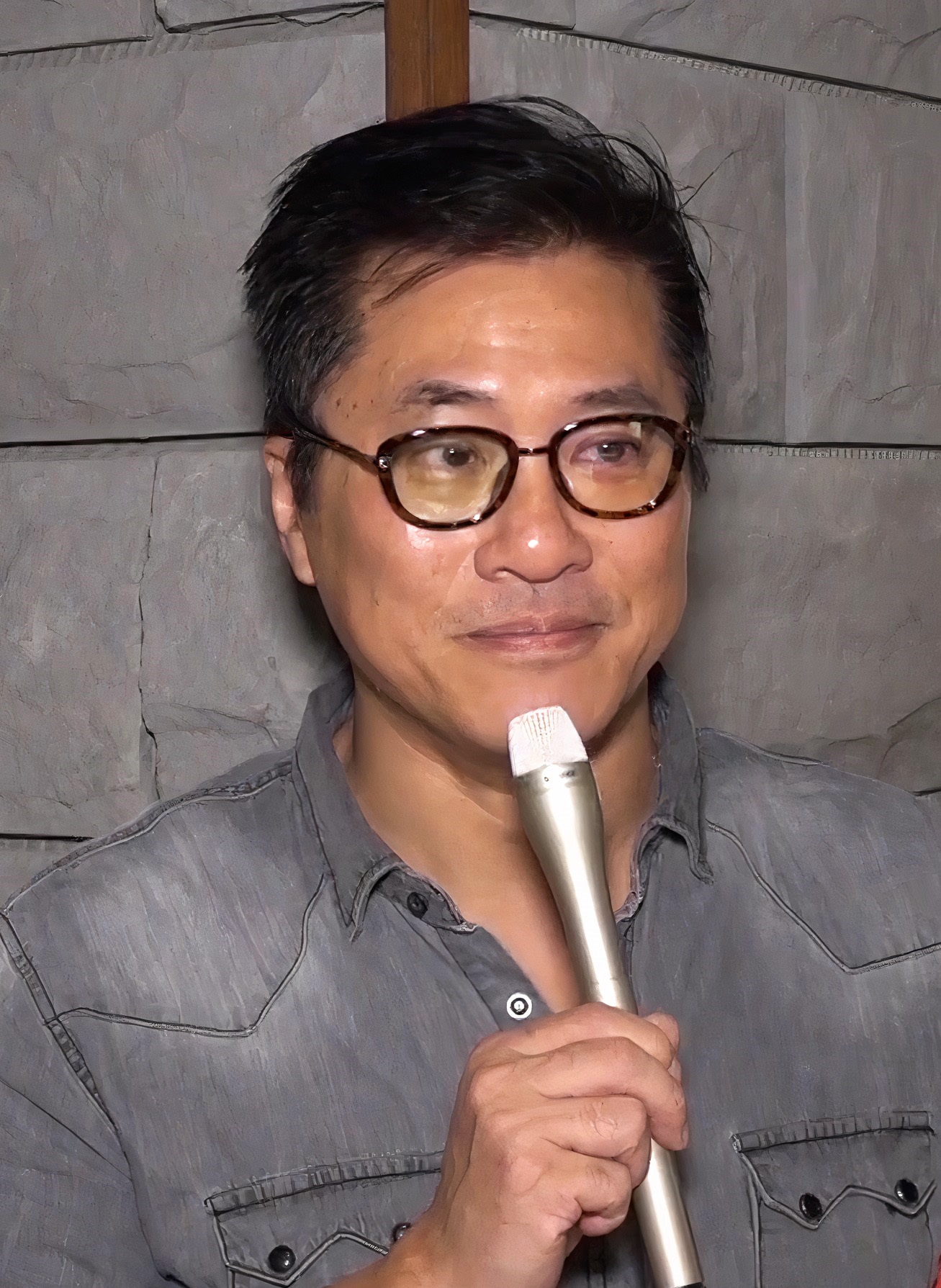
- Siu at the First Blood: The Last Blood Premiere, 2019
- Born: Hong Kong
- Occupation: Actor
- Years active: 1987–1997

Chinese name
Transcriptions
Standard Mandarin
- Hanyu Pinyin: Shào Zhònghéng
Yue: Cantonese
- Jyutping: Siu6 Zung6 Hang4

David Siu Chung-hang is a former Hong Kong TVB actor. He is best known for his role as Ting How-hai (丁孝蟹) in the 1992 TVB series The Greed of Man. He entered TVB in 1987 and starred in a number TV series including Behind Silk Curtains, A Trial of Lifetime, Bet On Fate, The Link, and Remembrance. In 1994, he turned to work for ATV and devoted himself to running a 4-wheel drive conversion shop in Hong Kong.

== Biography ==
David Siu was born in Hong Kong. He comes from a middle-class family. Before joining Hong Kong entertainment, he had graduated the architecture major at Polytechnic University in San Francisco, United States. He worked as an interior designer at a company in Hong Kong. In addition, he studied political strategies at Berkeley University, USA.

== Career ==
David Siu entered showbusiness in Hong Kong in the late 80s, as a trainee of the 17th TVB acting class in 1987, in company with the Hong Kong "Heavenly King" Aaron Kwok.

In 1987, TVB held a talent contest to select actors, which Siu won. TVB invited him sign up with them, so he resigned the first job to become an actor.

TVB promoted him actively through leading roles in many TV series, including: Behind Silk Curtains, The Tribulation of Life, Mo Min Kap Sin Fung, A Triad of Lifetime, The Greed of Man, The Link, and Remembrance. The role of Ting How-hai (丁孝蟹) in the 1992 TVB series The Greed of Man is the most prominent role of his career.

In 1993, Siu played the character Sung Man Jeun ( 宋文俊) in the TV series The Link. His character falls in love with a rising movie star (played by Amy Kwok), with whom Siu had good chemistry. The success of this role raised his popularity in both Hong Kong and Taiwan, following which Taiwan broadcast television invited him star in the film Days Of Tomorrow (天長地久).

In 1995, Siu left TVB because he had not reached agreements in signing a new contract. Later, he signed a short contract with Asia Television (ATV). He appeared in such TV series as Justic Bao, Coincidentally, and Beggar King.

Until 1997, Siu decided to take leave of Hong Kong entertainment. He began running a 4-wheel drive conversion shop in Hong Kong.

In 2012, Siu returned to Hong Kong entertainment to reshoot films. In 2014, he shot the film Dot to Dot. After that, he participated in The Anniversary in 2015. In that film, he reunited with co-star Loletta Lee 23 years following their success in The Greed of Man.

== Filmography ==
=== Film ===
- Dealy Lovers (1988)
- Fatal Love (1993) as Officer Ma
- Fussy Ghost (1993)
- Vampire Family (1993) as Johnny
- Island Fear (1994) as Ken Mok
- To Love Ferrar (1994) as Sam
- Girls Unbotton (1994) as Mr Pong Kwong Yim
- City Maniac (1995) as Policeman
- Dot 2 Dot (2014)
- Anniversary (2015)
- Refuge II (2015) as Rob (Hollywood film)
- Napping Kid (2018)

=== TV series ===
- The Final Verdict (1988)
- Behind Silk Curtains (1988) as Ling Ka Ming
- A Friend in Need (1988) as Fang Hao Ming
- The Tribulation of Life (1988) as Cheng Yi
- Mo Min Kap Sin Fung (1989) as Hau Man-Wan
- A Triad of Lifetime (1989)
- Three in a Crowd (1989)
- The Enforcer's Experience (1990) as Gao Man Piew
- When Things Get Tough (1990)
- A Time of Taste (1990) as Yuk Hung Chim/Yuk Hung Go
- The Ruin of War (1991)
- Impossible Dream (1991) as Ting Tai Ti
- Land of Condors (1992)
- Bet on Fate (1992)
- The Greed of Man (1992) as Ting How-hai
- The Link (1993) as Sung Man Jeun
- The Kung Fu Kid (1994)
- Remembrance (1994) as Long Wu
- Coincidentally (1997)
- SFC 3 (2015)
