= Canti Lau =

Hong Kong actor (born 1964)

Lau Sek Ming
- Born: 16 July 1964 (age 62); Hong Kong
- Occupations: Actor, singer
- Years active: 1987–present

Chinese name
- Traditional Chinese: 劉錫明
- Simplified Chinese: 刘锡明
Transcriptions

Lau Sek Ming (Chinese: 劉錫明; pinyin: Liu Xi Ming; born 16 July 1964) is a Hong Kong actor and singer. He was born in Hong Kong, but his ancestral home is Chaoyang, Guangdong, China.

== Filmography ==
- Summer of Foam (2010) TV series
- The KungFu Master (2012)
- Zombies Reborn (2012)
- Cold Pupil (2013)
- The Demi-Gods and Semi-Devils (2013)
- Chinese Paladin 5 (TV series)
- The Princess Weiyoung (2016)
- The Legend of Dragon Pearl (2017)
- Ode to Gallantry (2017)
- The Thief Rule (2017)
- Princess Silver (2019)
- Love of Thousand Years (2020)
