= Kitty Lai =

Hong Kong actress

- 黎美嫻
- Born: 19 October 1966 (age 59); Hong Kong ancestral hometown: gaoming district(高明區)，fo shan city, China
- Occupations: Former Actress, Former Hospital Christian Ministry Assistant
- Years active: 1985-2000
- Spouse: Jackie Tse (m. 2005)

Kitty Lai Mei Han (Chinese: 黎美嫻, born October 19, 1966) is a Hong Kong retired actress and most notable for her performance in TVB drama series The New Heavenly Sword and Dragon Sabre (倚天屠龍記) as Chiu Man / Zhao Min (趙敏), and Two Most Honorable Knights (絕代雙驕) as Tit Sum-lan / Tie Sin Lan (鐵心蘭).

== Career ==
Kitty made her debut in 1985 after joining TVB acting class and was heavily promoted by TVB. At the age of 20, she quickly rose to fame and became a leading actress in several drama series including The Legend of Dik Ching(狄青) (TVB, 1986), The Ordeal Before the Revolution (賊公阿牛) (TVB, 1986), and The New Heavenly Sword and Dragon Sabre (倚天屠龍記)(TVB, 1986). She became one of TVB's Five Beauties and was regarded as the “Queen of Ancient Costumes” as she often appeared in TVB's period costume dramas.

Kitty stayed with TVB until 1991 and left to further her career in Taiwan, Singapore, Malaysia and the mainland China. In 2000, she retired from the acting career and started working for hospital Christian ministry.

== Personal life ==
Kitty converted to Christianity in 1996.

In 2005, Kitty married a pilot named Jackie Tse Hing-siu (謝興肇) of Cathay Pacific Airlines. Currently, Kitty is a full-time housewife and a volunteer for church and charity services. During her spare time, Kitty joins the Home of the Artists along with Ada Choi, Monica Chan, Noel Leung, and other actresses.

== Filmography ==
=== TV Series ===
Before Dawn (愛在暴風的日子) (TVB, 1998)

The Land of the Condors (大地飛鷹) (TVB, 1992)

The Mystery of the Parchment (天龍奇俠) (TVB, 1990)

When Things Get Tough (午夜太陽) (TVB, 1990)

The Challenge of Life (人在邊緣) (TVB, 1990)

Blood of Good and Evil (我本善良) (TVB, 1990)

War Heroes (天變) (TVB, 1989)

Deadly Secret (連城訣) (TVB, 1989)

Yanky Boy (回到唐山) (TVB, 1989)

Mo Min Kap Sin Fung / File Noir (無冕急先鋒) (TVB, 1989)

Withered in the Wind (名門) (TVB, 1988)

Two Most Honorable Knights (絕代雙驕) (TVB, 1988)

Behind Silk Curtains (大都會) (TVB, 1988)

The Rise of a Kung Fu Master (南拳蔡李佛) (TVB, 1988)

The Legend of the Book and the Sword (書劍恩仇錄) (TVB, 1987)

New Heavenly Sword & Dragon Sabre (倚天屠龍記) (TVB, 1986)

Turn Around and Die (英雄故事) (TVB, 1986)

The Ordeal Before the Revolution (賊公阿牛) (TVB, 1986)

The Legend of Dik Ching (狄青) (TVB, 1986)

The Battle Among the Clans (大香港) (TVB, 1985)
