= Margie Tsang =

Hong Kong actress and presenter

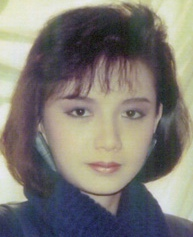
Margie Tsang

Margie Tsang Wah Sin (Chinese: 曾華倩) (born 6 August 1965) is a Hong Kong actress and TV programme host.

== Career ==
When Tsang was 17 years old in 1982, she took part in TVB's 12th annual artist training class. After she signed a contract with TVB, the company immediately listed her as an important actress to promote, according to Phoenix Television. She repeatedly appeared on the children's TV show 430 Space Shuttle and played Miu Yuek-lan in the TV series The Flying Fox of Snowy Mountain. Tsang acted in the TV series Police Cadet '85 and The Yang's Saga among many others.

== Filmography ==
- The Flying Fox of Snowy Mountain (1985) (TV series) as Miu Yuek-lan
- Police Cadet '85 (1985) (TV series) as Yip How Yee
- Young Cops (1985)
- The Dragon Sword (1986)
- New Heavenly Sword and Dragon Sabre (1986) (TV series) as Kwok Seung (cameo)
- The Yang's Saga (1986) (TV miniseries) as To Kam-ngor
- The Grand Canal (1987)
- Scared Stiff (1987)
- How to Pick Girls Up! (1988)
- The Black Sabre (1989)
- Everybody loves somebody (1989)
- Beauty And The 7 Beasts (2007)
- D.I.E. (2008) (TV series) as Yue Chi-Ching
- When A Dog Loves A Cat (2008) (TV series) as Shui Tin-Lan (Tina)
- All's Well, Ends Well 2011 (2011) as Helen Cheng
- Eight Happiness 2012 (2012)

== Personal life ==
After Vocational education Shortly after signing with TVB, she began a relationship with Tony Leung Chiu-wai which later ended. In 1996, she married Lam Siu-Kei (林肇基) in London. They divorced in 2002. They gave birth to a child (Martin Lam) on January 1, 1999 in Sha Tin Union Hospital.
