= Liu Wai-hung =

Hong Kong actor

Liu Wai Hung
- Born: December 9, 1957 (age 67); Hong Kong
- Occupation: Actor

Chinese name
- Traditional Chinese: 廖偉雄
- Simplified Chinese: 廖伟雄
Transcriptions
Standard Mandarin
- Hanyu Pinyin: Liào Wěixióng

Liu Wai Hung (simplified Chinese: 廖伟雄; traditional Chinese: 廖偉雄; pinyin: Liào Wěixióng; born 9 December 1957) is a former actor in TVB with his famous nickname "Ar Chan" (阿燦).

Liu was born in Hong Kong with family roots in Shunde, Guangdong, China. He joined TVB in 1977. In the firm The Good, The Bad And The Ugly (網中人), he acted as a new immigrant from Mainland China called "Ar Chan", so he got the nickname of "Ar Chan" from that moment. Also, "Ar Chan" became a popular name to represent new immigrants coming from Mainland between the 1970s and 1990s in Hong Kong.

Between the 1980s and 1990s, Liu took part in Enjoy Yourself Tonight, one of the most popular variety shows in Hong Kong, and later The Funny Half Show.

In the 1990s, Liu left TVB and did business in many sectors, such as Karaoke invested in Mainland China and Chinese char siu invested in Malaysia. But, he lost in this investment and recently he joined a HK listed company and went back on track in the agricultural business. He truly is a hard working honorable man. He has a Malaysian wife and a daughter and a son.

Recently, he stayed in Luoding, Guangdong and restarted his business of organic farm products in there. He has since been endorsed in an organic rice known as 'AH CHARN RICE'.

He starred in Rain Dogs, a movie directed by Ho Yuhang which was shown at the 11th Pusan International Film Festival in 2006.

Liu started an organic durian farm in Malaysia at the beginning of the COVID-19 pandemic.

== Filmography ==
- The Heaven Sword and Dragon Saber (1978)
- The Perfect Match (1982) (TV series)
- Once Upon a Mirage (1982)
- The Return of Wong Fei Hung (1984)
- The Iceman Cometh (1989)
- They Came to Rob Hong Kong (1989)
- Little Cop (1989)
- Being Twins (1992)
- Comic King (2000)
- Undercover Blues (2000)
- Rain Dogs (2006)
