= Eddie Kwan =

Hong Kong entrepreneur and accountant

DR Eddie King-hung Kwan 關景鴻 博士 JP

Personal details
- Born: 1957 British Hong Kong
- Died: June 2023 (aged 65–66) First possibility: Calgary, Canada; Second possibility: Tsim Sha Tsui, Hong Kong

Dr Eddie King-hung Kwan, JP (Chinese: 關景鴻博士, 1957 - June 2023), was a Hong Kong entrepreneur, accountant, had a known as the "Godfather of Immigration" (移民教父), he is the founder and former chairman of EK International Holdings.

== Early life and education ==
Kwan's ancestral home was in Kaiping City, Guangdong Province, Mainland China. He attended Yuet Wah College in Macau for secondary education. In 1978, he graduated from the Hong Kong Polytechnic with a major in accounting.

In 1980, he immigrated to Canada with his parents and continued to work as an accountant. During the emigration wave before the handover of Hong Kong from the United Kingdom to China, many friends asked Kwan about immigration matters. Kwan also gained experience by understanding the details with the Canadian immigration department.

In 1990, Kwan formed EK International Holdings to take on emigration cases and was reported the company took 30 immigration cases a month in its first year while operating at a low cost. EK International Holdings would advertise on TVB and Asia Television, television channels in Hong Kong, with advertising slogans such as "Forever friends, forever service." (永遠朋友，永遠服務。), "I can help you." (我可以幫到你。) and "Guaranteed application success, otherwise your money will be returned." (保證申請成功，否則原銀奉還。). Due to the catchiness of the advertising slogans, Kwan was deeply rooted in the hearts of the Hongkongers.

== Personal life ==
On July 19, 2023, EK International Holdings issued an obituary stating that Kwan had died in June 2023 (date to be investigated) at the age of 66. (Some say 65 years old)
