= Tianya Genu =

天涯歌女 may refer to:

- "The Wandering Songstress", a song sung first by Zhou Xuan
- Song Bird (TV series), a Hong Kong television series
- Street Angel (1937 film), a Chinese film
