= Hong Kong action cinema =

Film genre

Hong Kong action cinema is the principal source of the Hong Kong film industry's global fame. Action films from Hong Kong have roots in Chinese and Hong Kong cultures, including Chinese opera, storytelling and aesthetic traditions, which Hong Kong filmmakers combined with elements from Hollywood and Japanese cinema along with new action choreography and filmmaking techniques, to create a culturally distinctive form that went on to have wide transcultural appeal. In turn, Hollywood action films have been heavily influenced by Hong Kong genre conventions, from the 1970s onwards.

The first Hong Kong action films favoured the wuxia style, emphasizing mysticism and swordplay, but this trend was politically suppressed in the 1930s and replaced by kung fu films that depicted more down-to-earth unarmed martial arts, often featuring folk heroes such as Wong Fei Hung. Post-war cultural upheavals led to a second wave of wuxia films with highly acrobatic violence, followed by the emergence of the grittier kung fu films for which the Shaw Brothers studio became best known.

Hong Kong action cinema peaked from the 1970s to the 1990s. The 1970s saw a resurgence in kung fu films during the rise and sudden death of Bruce Lee. He was succeeded in the 1980s by Jackie Chan—who popularized the use of comedy, dangerous stunts, and modern urban settings in action films—and Jet Li, whose authentic wushu skills appealed to both eastern and western audiences. The innovative work of directors and producers like Tsui Hark and John Woo introduced further variety, with genres such as heroic bloodshed and gun fu films, and themes such as triads and the supernatural. However, an exodus by many leading figures to Hollywood in the 1990s coincided with a downturn in the industry.

== Early martial arts films (early 20th century) ==
The Swordswoman of Huangjiang (1930) co-starring Chen Zhi-gong.

The signature contribution to action cinema from the Chinese-speaking world is the martial arts film, the most famous of which were developed in Hong Kong. The genre emerged first in Chinese popular literature. The early 20th century saw an explosion of what were called wuxia novels (often translated as "martial chivalry"), generally published in serialized form in newspapers. These were tales of heroic, sword-wielding warriors, often featuring mystical or fantasy elements. This genre was quickly seized on by early Chinese films, particularly in the movie capital of the time, Shanghai. Starting in the 1920s, wuxia titles, often adapted from novels (for example, 1928's The Burning of the Red Lotus Monastery and its eighteen sequels) were hugely popular and the genre dominated Chinese film for several years.

The boom came to an end in the 1930s, caused by official opposition from cultural and political elites, especially the Kuomintang government, who saw it as promoting superstition and violent anarchy. Wuxia filmmaking was picked up in Hong Kong, at the time a British colony with a highly liberal economy and culture and a developing film industry. The first martial arts film in Cantonese, the dominant Chinese spoken language of Hong Kong, was The Adorned Pavilion (1938).

== Post-war martial arts cinema (1940s to early 1960s) ==
Scene from the wuxia film Buddha's Palm (1964). The magic qi rays are created using crude hand-drawn animation.

By the late 1940s, upheavals in mainland China—the Second Sino-Japanese War, the Chinese Civil War, and the victory of the Chinese Communist Party—had shifted the centre of Chinese language filmmaking to Hong Kong. The industry continued the wuxia tradition in Cantonese B movies and serials, although the more prestigious Mandarin-language cinema generally ignored the genre. Animation and special effects drawn directly on the film by hand were used to simulate the flying abilities and other preternatural powers of characters; later titles in the cycle included The Six-Fingered Lord of the Lute (1965) and Sacred Fire, Heroic Wind (1966).

A counter-tradition to the wuxia films emerged in the kung fu movies that were also produced at this time. These movies emphasized more "authentic", down-to-earth and unarmed combat over the swordplay and mysticism of wuxia. The most famous exemplar was real-life martial artist Kwan Tak Hing; he became an avuncular hero figure to at least a couple of generations of Hong Kongers by playing historical folk hero Wong Fei Hung in a series of roughly one hundred movies, from The True Story of Wong Fei Hung (1949) through to Wong Fei Hung Bravely Crushing the Fire Formation (1970). A number of enduring elements were introduced or solidified by these films: the still-popular character of "Master Wong"; the influence of Chinese opera with its stylized martial arts and acrobatics; and the concept of martial arts heroes as exponents of Confucian ethics.

== "New School" wuxia (late 1960s to early 1970s) ==
In the second half of the 1960s, the era's biggest studio, Shaw Brothers, inaugurated a new generation of wuxia films, starting with Xu Zenghong's Temple of the Red Lotus (1965), a remake of the 1928 classic. These Mandarin productions were more lavish and in colour; their style was less fantastical and more intense, with stronger and more acrobatic violence. They were influenced by imported samurai movies from Japan and by the wave of "New School" wuxia novels by authors like Jin Yong and Liang Yusheng that started in the 1950s.

The New School wuxia wave marked the move of male-oriented action films to the centre of Hong Kong cinema, which had long been dominated by female stars and genres aimed at female audiences, such as romances and musicals. Even so, during the 1960s female action stars like Cheng Pei-pei and Connie Chan Po-chu were prominent alongside male stars, such as former swimming champion Jimmy Wang Yu, and they continued an old tradition of female warriors in wuxia storyte directors of the period were Chang Cheh with One-Armed Swordsman (1967) and Golden Swallow (1968) and King Hu with Come Drink with Me (1966). Hu soon left Shaw Brothers to pursue his own vision of wuxia with independent productions in Taiwan, such as the enormously successful Dragon Inn (1967, a.k.a. Dragon Gate Inn) and A Touch of Zen which was nominated for the Palme d'Or at the 1975 Cannes Film Festival. Chang stayed on and remained the Shaws' prolific star director into the early 1980s.

== Kung fu wave (1970s) ==
The early 1970s saw wuxia giving way to a new, grittier and more graphic (and Mandarin-speaking) iteration of the kung fu movie, which came to dominate through the decade and into the early 1980s. Seriously trained martial artists such as Ti Lung and Gordon Liu became some of the top stars as increasing proportions of running times were devoted to combat set-pieces. Chinese Boxer (1970), starring and directed by Jimmy Wang Yu, is widely credited with launching the kung fu boom. But remaining at the vanguard, at least initially, were Shaw Brothers and director Chang Cheh. Chang's Vengeance (1970) was another of the first trendsetters and his dozens of contributions included The Boxer from Shantung (1972), Heroes Two (1974), Five Deadly Venoms (1978) and Crippled Avengers (1979). Kung fu cinema was particularly influenced by Chang's concern with his vision of masculine values and male friendship; the female warrior figures who had been prominent in late 1960s wuxia work were sidelined, with prominent exceptions such as the popular Angela Mao.

Chang's only competitor as the genre's most influential filmmaker was his long-time action choreographer, Lau Kar Leung (a.k.a. Liu Chia Liang in Mandarin). Lau began directing his own movies for the Shaw brothers in 1975 with The Spiritual Boxer, a progenitor of the kung fu comedy. In subsequent titles like Executioners from Shaolin (1977), The 36th Chamber of Shaolin (1978), and Legendary Weapons of China (1982), Lau emphasized the traditions and philosophy of the martial arts and strove to give onscreen fighting greater authenticity and ever greater speed and intricacy.

The kung fu boom was partly fueled by enormous international popularity, and not just in East Asia. In the West, kung fu imports, dubbed and often recut and retitled, shown as "B" films in urban theaters and on television, made Hong Kong film widely noticed, although not widely respected, for the first time. African Americans particularly embraced the genre (as exemplified by the popular hip-hop group, the Wu-Tang Clan) perhaps as an almost unprecedented source of adventure stories with non-white heroes, who furthermore often displayed a strong streak of racial and/or nationalistic pride.

The popularity of these movies in North America would continue into the 1980s when ninja movies were introduced. In popular culture, the films of this era were colloquially known as Kung Fu Theater or Black Belt Theater, names that many independent stations used for their weekly airing slot.

The Brothers (1979), a Shaw Brothers production, was a significant departure from the kung fu films the studio was known for. The Brothers was an action crime-drama, about two brothers on opposing sides of the law. It was a remake of the Indian crime drama Deewaar (1975), written by Salim–Javed. In turn, The Brothers laid the foundations for the heroic bloodshed genre of 1980s Hong Kong cinema, inspiring John Woo's breakthrough film A Better Tomorrow (1986).

=== Bruce Lee ===
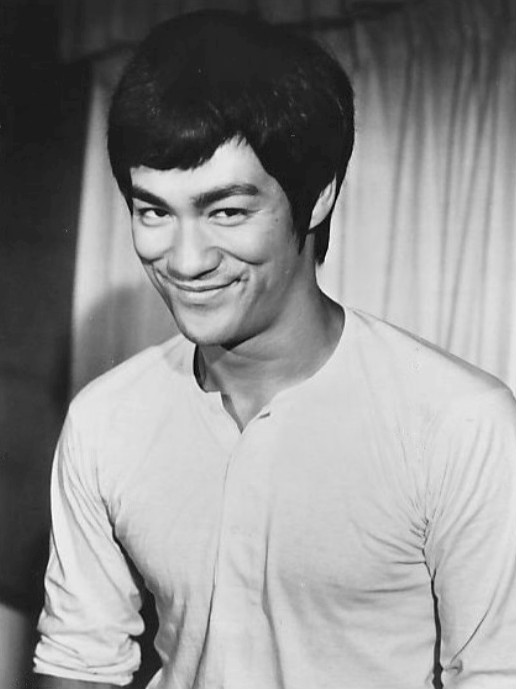
Bruce Lee in 1971

No single figure was more responsible for this international profile than Bruce Lee, an American-born, Hong Kong-raised martial artist and actor. Despite his larger filmography, Lee starred in just four completed martial arts films before his untimely death at age 32: The Big Boss (1971), Fist of Fury and Way of the Dragon (both 1972), and Enter the Dragon (1973). Eastern film historian Patrick Macias ascribes his success to "(bringing) the warrior spirit of old into the present day... developing his own fighting style... and possessing superhuman charisma". His first three movies broke local box office records and were successful in much of the world. Fist of Fury and Way of the Dragon went on to gross an estimated US$100 million and US$130 million worldwide, respectively.

The English-language Enter the Dragon, the first-ever US-Hong Kong co-production, grossed an estimated US$350 million worldwide, making it the most internationally successful film from the region. Furthermore, his decision at the outset to work for young, upstart studio Golden Harvest, rather than accept the Shaws' notoriously tightfisted standard contract, was a factor in Golden Harvest's meteoric rise and Shaw's eventual decline.

=== Jackie Chan and the kung fu comedy ===
The only Chinese performer who has ever rivalled Bruce Lee's global fame is Jackie Chan. Like many kung fu performers of the day, Chan came out of training in Peking opera and started in film as a stuntman, notably in some of Lee's vehicles. He was groomed for a while by The Big Boss and Fist of Fury director Lo Wei as another Lee clone, in several movies including New Fist of Fury (1976), with little success. But in 1978, Chan teamed up with action choreographer Yuen Woo Ping on Yuen's directorial debut, Snake in the Eagle's Shadow. The resulting blend of physical comedy and kung fu action provided Chan with his first hit and the rudiments of what would become his signature style. Chan's follow-up movie with Yuen, Drunken Master (also 1978), and his directorial debut, The Fearless Hyena (1979), were also giant hits and cemented his popularity.

Sammo Hung as a wise master in Tsui Hark's Zu Warriors from the Magic Mountain from 1983. The white eyebrows speak of extraordinary power on the part of the character.

Although these films were not the first kung fu comedies, they launched a vogue that helped reinvigorate the waning kung fu genre. Especially notable in this regard were two of Chan's childhood Peking Opera School classmates, Sammo Hung and Yuen Biao, who also made careers of this specialty, sometimes co-starring with Chan. Hung, noted for the seeming paradox of his overweight physique and physical agility, also made a name for himself as a director and action choreographer from early on, with titles like Enter the Fat Dragon (1978).

== Reinventing action cinema (1980s to early 1990s) ==
Chan's clowning may have helped extend the life of the kung fu wave for several years. Nevertheless, he became a star towards the end of the boom, and would soon help move the colony towards a new type of action. In the 1980s, he and many colleagues would forge a slicker, more spectacular Hong Kong pop cinema that would successfully compete with the post-Star Wars summer blockbusters from America.

=== Jackie Chan and the modern martial arts stunt action film ===
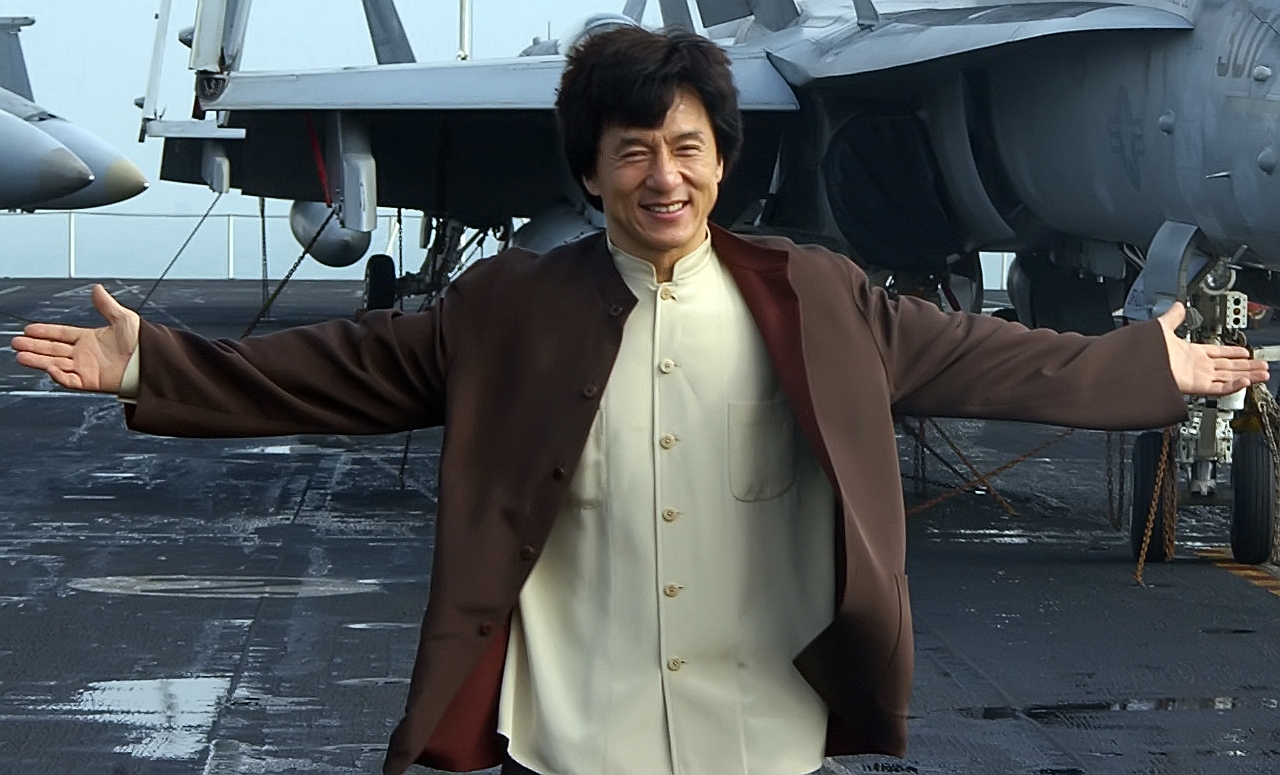
Jackie Chan in 2002

In the early 1980s, Jackie Chan began experimenting with elaborate stunt action sequences in films such as The Young Master (1980) and especially Dragon Lord (1982), which featured a pyramid fight scene that holds the record for the most takes required for a single scene, with 2900 takes, and the final fight scene in which he performs various stunts, including one where he does a back flip off a loft and falls to the lower ground. By 1983, Chan had branched out into action films which, though they still used martial arts, were less limited in scope, setting and plot, with an emphasis on elaborate yet dangerous stunt sequences. His first film in this vein, Project A (1983), saw the official formation of the Jackie Chan Stunt Team and added elaborate, dangerous stunts to the fights and typical slapstick humor (at one point, Chan falls from the top of a clock tower through a series of fabric canopies). The new formula helped Project A gross over HK$19 million in Hong Kong, and significantly more in other Asian countries such as Japan, where it grossed ¥2.95 billion and became one of the highest-grossing films of 1984. Winners and Sinners (1983) also featured an elaborate action sequence that involves Chan skating along a busy high road, including a risky stunt where he slides under a truck.

Chan continued to take the approach – and the budgets – to new heights in hits like Police Story (1985), which is considered one of the greatest action films of all time. Here was Chan dangling from a speeding bus, destroying large parts of a hillside shantytown, fighting in a shopping mall while breaking many glass panes, and sliding down a pole covered with exploding light bulbs. The latter is considered one of the greatest stunts in the history of action cinema. The 1988 sequel called for explosions on a scale similar to many Hollywood movies and seriously injured leading lady Maggie Cheung – an occupational risk Chan had already grown used to. Thus Jackie Chan created the template for the contemporary urban action-comedy of the 1980s, combining cops, kung fu and all the body-breaking potential of the modern city with its glass, metal and speeding vehicles.

=== Tsui Hark and Cinema City ===
Chan's move towards larger-scale action films was paralleled by work coming out of Cinema City, the production company established in 1980 by comedians Raymond Wong, Karl Maka and Dean Shek. With movies like the spy spoof Aces Go Places (1982) and its sequels, Cinema City helped make modern special effects, James Bond-type gadgets and big vehicular stunts part of the industry vernacular. Director/producer Tsui Hark had a hand in shaping the Cinema City style while employed there from 1981–1983 but went on to make an even bigger impact after leaving. In such movies as Zu Warriors from the Magic Mountain (1983) and A Chinese Ghost Story (1987, directed by Ching Siu-tung), he kept pushing the boundaries of Hong Kong special effects. He led the way in replacing the rough and ready camera style of 1970s kung fu with glossier and more sophisticated visuals and ever more furious editing.

=== John Woo and the "heroic bloodshed" and "gun fu" triad films ===
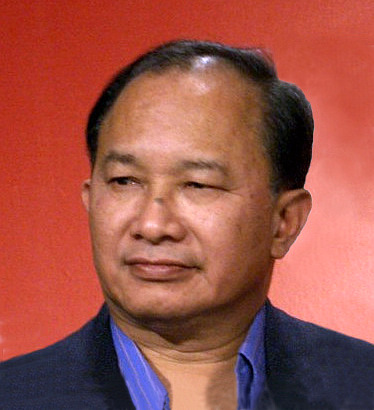
John Woo in 2005

As a producer, Tsui Hark facilitated the creation of John Woo's epoch-making heroic bloodshed movie A Better Tomorrow (1986). Woo's saga of cops and the triads (Chinese gangsters) combined fancifully choreographed (and extremely violent) gunplay (called gun fu) with heightened emotional melodrama, sometimes resembling a modern-dress version of 1970s kung fu films by Woo's mentor Chang Cheh. The formula broke another all-time box office record. It also jump-started the faltering career of co-star Chow Yun-fat, who overnight became one of the colony's most popular idols and Woo's favorite leading man.

For the remainder of the 1980s and into the early 1990s, a deluge of films by Woo and others explored similar territory, often with a similar visual style and thematic bent. They were usually marked by an emphasis on the fraternal bonds of duty and affection among the criminal protagonists. The most notable other auteur of these themes was Ringo Lam, who offered a less romanticized take in such films as City on Fire, Prison on Fire (both 1987), and Full Contact (1992), all starring Chow Yun-Fat. The genre and its creators were accused in some quarters of cravenly glorifying real-life triads, whose involvement in the film business was notorious.

=== The wire-work wave ===
As the triad films petered out in the early 1990s, period martial arts returned as the favored action genre. But this was a new martial arts cinema that took full advantage of technical strides as well the higher budgets that came with Hong Kong's dominance of the region's screens. These lavish productions were often adapted from the more fantastical wuxia novels, which featured flying warriors in mid-air combat. Performers were raised up on ultrathin wires to allow them to conduct gravity-defying action sequences, a technique known by Western fans, sometimes disparagingly, as wire fu.

As so often, Tsui Hark led the way. He produced Swordsman (1990), which reestablished the wuxia novels of Jin Yong as favorite big-screen sources (television adaptations had long been ubiquitous). He directed Once Upon a Time in China (1991), which resurrected oft-filmed folk hero Wong Fei Hung. Both films were followed by sequels and a raft of imitations, often starring Mainland wushu champion Jet Li. He went on to receive a special award for a mainland China person at the 1995 Taipei Golden Horse Film Festival. The other signature star of the subgenre was Taiwanese-born actress Brigitte Lin. She made an unlikely specialty of androgynous woman-warrior types, such as the villainous, sex-changing eunuch in The Swordsman 2 (1992), epitomizing martial arts fantasy's often-noted fascination with gender instability.

== International impact ==
=== First wave: kung fu craze (1970s–1980s) ===
Hong Kong's international impact initially came in the form of martial arts films, especially 1970s kung fu films and most notably those of Bruce Lee. His earliest attempts at introducing his brand of Hong Kong martial arts cinema to the West came in the form of American television shows, such as The Green Hornet (1966 debut) and Kung Fu (1972 debut). The "kung fu craze" began in 1973, with the unprecedented success of Hong Kong martial arts films at the North American box office. King Boxer (Five Fingers of Death) starring Indonesian-born actor Lo Lieh was the first Hong Kong film to top the US box office, paving the way for Bruce Lee's breakthrough with The Big Boss (Fists of Fury) topping the US box office. In May 1973, Hong Kong action cinema made US box office history, with three foreign films holding the top three spots for the first time: Fists of Fury, Lady Whirlwind (Deep Thrust), and Five Fingers of Death. Lee continued his success with Fist of Fury (The Chinese Connection), which also topped the US box office the following month.

Kung fu film releases in the United States initially targeted Asian American audiences, before becoming a breakout success among larger African-American and Hispanic audiences, and then among white working-class Americans. Kung fu films also became a global success, across Asia, Europe and the third world. This eventually paved the way for Lee's posthumous Hollywood film breakthrough with the Hong Kong and US co-production Enter the Dragon (1973). Hong Kong martial arts cinema subsequently inspired a wave of Western martial arts films and television shows throughout the 1970s–1990s (launching the careers of Western martial arts stars such as Jean-Claude Van Damme, Steven Seagal and Chuck Norris), as well as the more general integration of Asian martial arts into Western action films and television shows by the 1990s.

Sascha Matuszak of Vice said Enter the Dragon "is referenced in all manner of media, the plot line and characters continue to influence storytellers today, and the impact was particularly felt in the revolutionizing way the film portrayed African Americans, Asians and traditional martial arts." Kuan-Hsing Chen and Beng Huat Chua cited fight scenes in Hong Kong films such as Enter the Dragon as being influential for the way they pitched "an elemental story of good against evil in such a spectacle-saturated way".

In Japan, the manga and anime franchises Fist of the North Star (1983–1988) and Dragon Ball (1984–1995) were influenced by Hong Kong martial arts films, particularly 1970s kung fu films such as Bruce Lee's Enter the Dragon and Jackie Chan's Drunken Master (1978). In turn, Fist of the North Star and especially Dragon Ball are credited with setting the trends for popular shōnen manga and anime from the 1980s onwards.

Similarly in India, Hong Kong martial arts films had an influence on Bollywood masala films. After the success of Bruce Lee films (such as Enter the Dragon) in India, Deewaar (1975) and later Bollywood films incorporated fight scenes inspired by 1970s Hong Kong martial arts films up until the 1990s. Bollywood action scenes emulated Hong Kong rather than Hollywood, emphasising acrobatics and stunts and combining kung fu (as perceived by Indians) with Indian martial arts such as pehlwani.

Hong Kong martial arts films such as Enter the Dragon were the foundation for fighting games. The Street Fighter video game franchise (1987 debut) was inspired by Enter the Dragon, with the gameplay centered around an international fighting tournament, and each character having a unique combination of ethnicity, nationality and fighting style. Street Fighter went on to set the template for all fighting games that followed. The early beat 'em up game Kung-Fu Master (1984) was also based on Bruce Lee's Game of Death (1972) and Jackie Chan's Wheels on Meals (1984).

The success of Bruce Lee's films helped popularize the concept of mixed martial arts (MMA) in the West via his Jeet Kune Do system. In 2004, Ultimate Fighting Championship (UFC) founder Dana White called Lee the "father of mixed martial arts". Parkour was also influenced by the acrobatic antics of Jackie Chan in his Hong Kong action films, as well as the philosophy of Bruce Lee.

=== Second wave: modern action films (1990s–2000s) ===
Hong Kong action cinema's innovative developments in the 1980s had not only established Hong Kong as the dominant cinema in East Asia, but reawakened Western interest. By the 1990s, there was a second "Asian invasion" from Hong Kong action cinema, heavily influencing and revitalizing Hollywood action cinema. There was a significant crossover of Hong Kong stars, filmmakers and action choreographers from Hong Kong to Hollywood, in addition to the wide adoption of Hong Kong action filmmaking techniques in Hollywood. The wide adoption of Hong Kong action film conventions was referred to as the "Hong Kongification" of Hollywood.

Building on the reduced but enduring kung fu movie subculture, Jackie Chan and films like Tsui Hark's Peking Opera Blues (1986) were already building a cult following when Woo's The Killer (1989) had a limited but successful release in the U.S. and opened the floodgates. In the 1990s, Westerners with an eye on "alternative" culture became common sights in Chinatown video shops and theaters, and gradually the films became more available in the mainstream video market and even occasionally in mainstream theaters. Western critics and film scholars also began to take Hong Kong action cinema seriously and made many key figures and films part of their canon of world cinema.

From here, Hong Kong came to define a new vocabulary for worldwide action cinema, with the aid of a new generation of North American filmmakers. Quentin Tarantino's Reservoir Dogs (1992) drew inspiration from City on Fire and his two-part Kill Bill (2003–04) was in large part a martial arts homage, borrowing Yuen Woo-Ping as fight choreographer and actor. Robert Rodriguez's Desperado (1995) and its 2003 sequel Once Upon a Time in Mexico aped Woo's visual mannerisms. The Wachowski sisters' The Matrix trilogy (1999–2003) of science-fiction-action blockbusters borrowed from Woo and wire fu movies, and also employed Yuen behind the scenes. A number of Hollywood action stars also adopted the Hong Kong practice of training in martial arts and performing their own stunts, such as Keanu Reeves, Uma Thurman and Jason Statham. Martin Scorsese's crime film The Departed (2006) was a remake of the Infernal Affairs trilogy (2002–2003) by Andrew Lau and Alan Mak.

==== Influence of heroic bloodshed and gun fu films ====
The heroic bloodshed genre had a considerable impact on world cinema, especially Hollywood. The action, style, tropes and mannerisms established in 1980s Hong Kong heroic bloodshed films were later widely adopted by Hollywood in the 1990s, reshaping the way Hollywood action films were made. Lam's City on Fire (1987) inspired Quentin Tarantino's Reservoir Dogs (1992); Tarantino was an admirer of the heroic bloodshed genre. The Killer also heavily influenced Luc Besson's Léon: The Professional (1994). Eventually, John Woo himself introduced his brand of heroic bloodshed to Hollywood in the 1990s. By the late 1990s, Woo's style of cinema had become firmly established in Hollywood.

== Exit of many leading figures (late 1990s to early 2000s) ==
Due to the new-found international awareness of Hong Kong films during the 1980s and early 1990s and a downturn in the industry as the 1990s progressed, many of the leading lights of Hong Kong cinema left for Hollywood, which offered budgets and pay which could not be equalled by Hong Kong production companies.

John Woo left for Hollywood after his 1992 film Hard Boiled. His 1997 film Face/Off was the breakthrough that established his unique style in Hollywood. This effort was immensely popular with both critics and public alike (it grossed over US$240 million worldwide). Mission: Impossible 2 (2000) grossed over US$560 million worldwide. Since these two films, Woo has struggled to revisit his successes of the 1980s and early 1990s.

After over fifteen years of success in Hong Kong cinema and a couple of attempts to crack the U.S. market, Jackie Chan's 1995 film Rumble in the Bronx finally brought him recognition in the U.S. Since then, he has made several highly successful films for U.S. studios including Rush Hour (1998), Shanghai Noon (2000), and their respective sequels Rush Hour 2 (2001), Shanghai Knights (2003), and Rush Hour 3 (2007). Between his films for U.S. studios, he still makes films for Hong Kong studios, sometimes in English (Mr. Nice Guy and Who Am I?), often set in western countries like Australia or the Netherlands, and sometimes in Cantonese (2004's New Police Story and 2006's Rob-B-Hood). Because of his enormous U.S. popularity, these films are usually released in the U.S., a rarity for Hong Kong films, and generally attract respectable audience numbers.

Jet Li has reduced his Hong Kong output since 1998's Hitman concentrating on Hollywood instead. After a minor role in Lethal Weapon 4 (1998), he has gone on to star in several Hollywood films which have performed respectably and made a name for him with American audiences. So far, he has returned to Chinese cinema for only two films: Hero (2002) and Fearless (2006). He claimed Fearless would be his last traditional kung fu film.

Chow Yun-fat has also moved to Hollywood. After his 1995 film Peace Hotel, he has made a handful of films in Hollywood which have not seen as much success as those of the aforementioned figures'. These include The Replacement Killers (1998), The Corruptor (1999), Anna and the King (1999) and Bulletproof Monk (2003). He returned to China for 2000's Crouching Tiger, Hidden Dragon and 2006's Curse of the Golden Flower.

== Recent trends (late 1990s to present) ==
The Hong Kong film industry has been in a severe slump since the mid-1990s. The number of local films produced, and their box office takings, are dramatically reduced; American imports now dominate in a way they had not for decades, or perhaps ever. This crisis and increased contact with Western cinema have probably been the biggest recent influences on Hong Kong action cinema.

Luring local and regional youth audiences away from Hollywood is a constant concern. Action movies are now generally headlined by Cantonese pop music idols, such as Ekin Cheng and Nicholas Tse, enhanced with wires and digital effects – a trend also driven by the waning of a previous generation of martial arts-trained stars. The late 1990s witnessed a fad for Cantopop stars in high-tech, more American-styled action pictures such as Downtown Torpedoes (1997), Gen-X Cops and Purple Storm (both 1999).

Andrew Lau's wuxia comic-book adaptation The Storm Riders (1998) earned a record-breaking gross and ushered in an era of computer-generated imagery, previously little used in Hong Kong film. Tsui Hark's lavish CGI-enhanced efforts Time and Tide (2000) and The Legend of Zu (2001), however, were surprisingly unsuccessful. Comedy megastar and director Stephen Chow used digital effects to push his typical affectionate parody of martial arts conventions to cartoonish levels in Shaolin Soccer (2001) and Kung Fu Hustle (2004), each of which also set a new box office record.

Striking a different note were a series of crime films more restrained and actor-driven than the earlier, John Woo-inspired examples. The Milkyway Image production company was at the vanguard with examples like Patrick Yau's Expect the Unexpected (1998), Johnnie To's The Mission (1999) and Running Out of Time (1999). Andrew Lau and Alan Mak's blockbuster Infernal Affairs trilogy (2002–2003) has set off a mini-trend of brooding police thrillers.

Collaboration with other industries, particularly that of Mainland China, is another increasingly common survival and recovery strategy. Hong Kong stars and other personnel have been involved in international wuxia successes like Crouching Tiger, Hidden Dragon (2000), Hero (2002) and House of Flying Daggers (2004).

== See also ==
- Cinema of the world
- hkmdb.com
