= Huangjiang =

Huangjiang or Huang Jiang may refer to:

- Huangjiang, Guangdong (黄江镇), town and subdivision of Dongguan, Guangdong
- The Swordswoman of Huangjiang (荒江女侠第), a wuxia series
- Huangjiang (黄酱), called yellow soybean paste in English
- Huang River (Guizhou) (黄江; zh), right tributary of the upper Long River in the Qiannan Prefecture of Guizhou
- Huang River (Guangdong) (黄江; zh), 67 km (42 mi) river in Shanwei, Guangdong
