= The Swordswoman =

The Swordswoman may refer to:

- "Xianü" (short story), a short story by Pu Songling published in Strange Tales from a Chinese Studio
- The Swordswoman of Huangjiang, a 20th-century wuxia series
- The Swordswoman, a 1982 fantasy novel by Jessica Amanda Salmonson
