= He Luting =

Chinese musician (1903–1999)

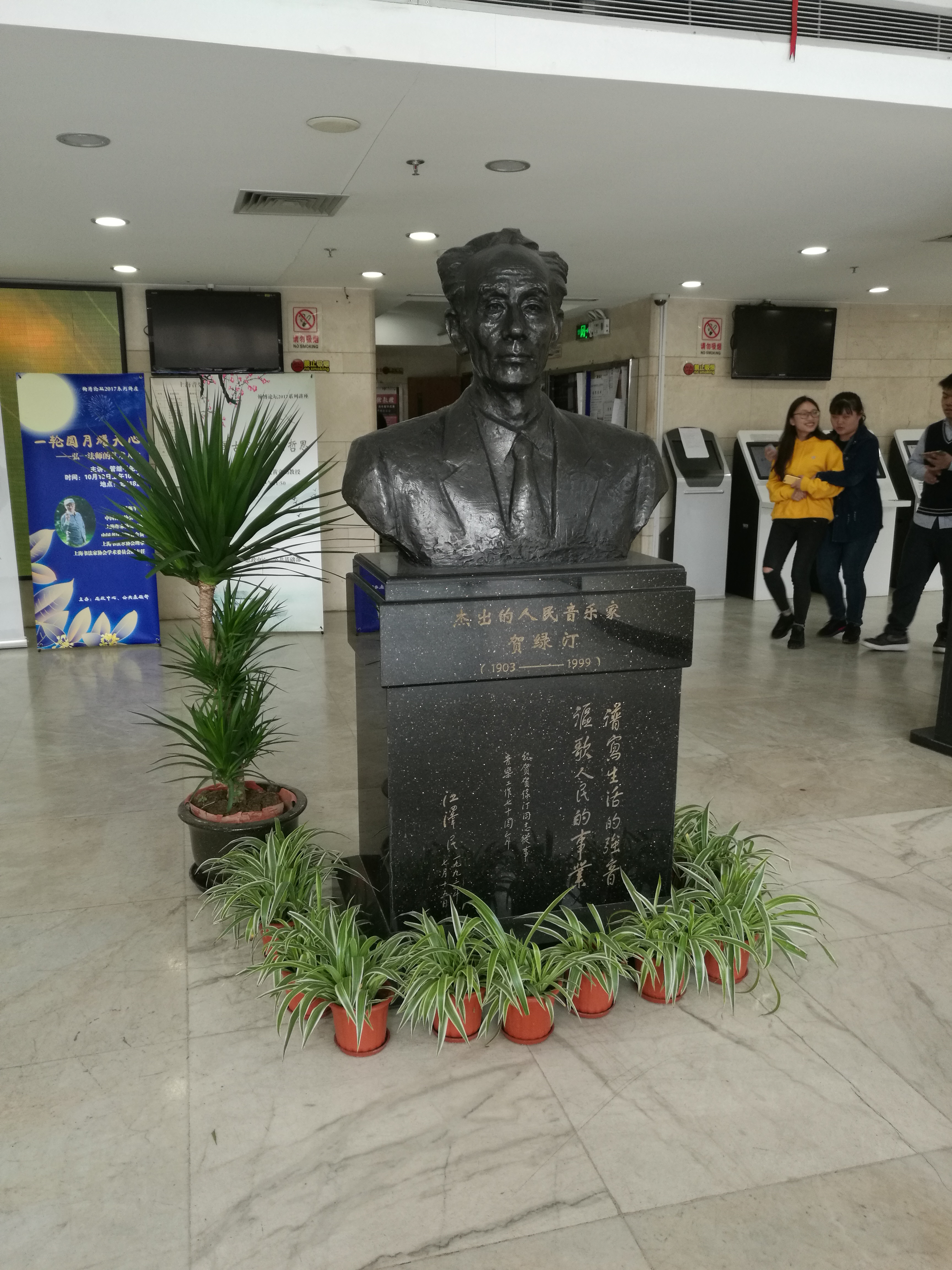
- statue in Shanghai Conservatory of Music
- Born: July 20, 1903; Qing dynasty Shaoyang County, Hunan
- Died: April 27, 1999 (aged 95); People's Republic of China Shanghai
- Era: 20th century

He Luting (traditional: 賀綠汀; simplified: 贺绿汀; pinyin: Hè Lùtīng; July 20, 1903 – April 27, 1999) was a Chinese composer of the early 20th century. He composed songs for Chinese films beginning in the 1930s, some of which remain popular.

During the 1930s, He studied at the Shanghai Conservatory of Music under Huang Tzu and Russian composer Alexander Tcherepnin. Tcherepnin named him winner of a piano composition contest in 1934 for his work Buffalo Boy's Flute (Mù Tóng Duǎn Dí,《牧童短笛》), which made him famous nationwide. His best-known compositions are "Song of the Four Seasons" (Sì Jì Gē,《四季歌》) and "The Wandering Songstress" (Tiānyá Gē Nǚ,《天涯歌女》), with lyrics by Tian Han), both composed for the 1937 film Street Angel and sung by Zhou Xuan.

Clip from Street Angel film

with 《四季歌》 and 《天涯歌女》

He Luting had a complicated relationship with the Chinese Communist Party. He became a member after moving to Shanghai, and during the Second Sino-Japanese War he wrote several songs for the "mass song movement", most famously the "Guerrillas' Song". After the Communist victory in the Civil War, he was appointed director of the Shanghai Conservatory of Music. But during the Cultural Revolution, He Luting became a target due to his association with Western music and particularly his defence of Claude Debussy. He refused to confess despite being subjected to physical abuse and interrogation on public television. Alex Ross claimed that no composer had ever made a braver stand against totalitarianism. After the end of the Cultural Revolution in 1976, He Luting returned to his position as Director of the Shanghai Conservatory and was allowed to travel overseas, visiting Australia in 1979. In 1984 he retired from his position, retaining the title of honorary director. The main concert hall at the Shanghai Conservatory of Music is named after He.

== See also ==
- Nie Er
- Lü Ji (composer)
- Xian Xinghai
- Ren Guang
