= Huanzhulouzhu =

Chinese author

- Born: Li Shoumin; 28 February 1902; Sichuan, Qing China
- Died: 2 May 1961 (aged 59); China
- Occupation: Writer
- Writing career
- Genre: Xianxia
- Notable work: Legend of the Swordsmen of the Mountains of Shu

Li Shoumin (Chinese: 李壽民; Wade–Giles: Li Shou-min; 1902–1961), better known by his pen name Huanzhulouzhu (Chinese: 還珠樓主; Wade–Giles: Huan-chu-lou-chu; lit. ''Lord of Pearl-Returning Tower''), was a Chinese wuxia and xianxia writer.

His 1946 novel Blades from the Willows (柳湖俠隱), a prequel of his magnum opus Legend of the Swordsmen of the Mountains of Shu, was one of the first wuxia novels translated into English. Other wuxia writers whose novels were also among the first translated into English include Wang Dulu, Gong Baiyu, Zheng Zhengyin, and Zhu Zhenmu.

== In other Media ==
Some of the films and TV series based on his novels are:

- Zu: Warriors from the Magic Mountain (1983 Hong Kong film)
- The Gods and Demons of Zu Mountain (1990 Hong Kong TV series)
- The Zu Mountain Saga (1991 Hong Kong TV series)
- The Legend of Zu (2001 Hong Kong film)
- Legend of Zu Mountain (2015 Chinese TV series)

== Works in English translation ==
- Huanzhulouzhu (1991) [1946]. Blades from the Willows: A Chinese Novel of Fantasy and Martial Adventure. Translated by Robert Chard. Wellsweep Press. ISBN 0-948454-05-9.

== See also ==
- Wang Dulu
- Gong Baiyu
