= Legend of the Swordsmen of the Mountains of Shu =

1932 novel by Huanzhulouzhu

- 1985 edition published by Linking Publishing
- Author: Huanzhulouzhu
- Original title: 蜀山劍俠傳 or 蜀山劔俠傳
- Cover artist: Li Zhaodao
- Language: Chinese
- Genre: Gods and demons fiction, Xianxia, Wuxia
- Set in: Sichuan
- Publication date: 1932
- Publication place: Republican China
- Media type: Print (paperback)
- Pages: 7227
- ISBN: 9789570809268
- Followed by: Blades for Willows

Legend of the Swordsmen of the Mountains of Shu (traditional Chinese: 蜀山劍俠傳; simplified Chinese: 蜀山剑侠传; pinyin: Shǔshān jiànxiá zhuàn; Wade–Giles: Shu³-shan¹ chien⁴-hsia² chuan⁴) is a 1932 wuxia novel written by the Sichuanese writer Huanzhulouzhu.

The book was later adapted into two Hong Kong films both directed by Tsui Hark: Zu Warriors from the Magic Mountain (1983) and The Legend of Zu (2001). It was also adapted into various television series.

== Adaptations ==
The book has been adapted into television shows and films:

- Zu: Warriors from the Magic Mountain (1983 Hong Kong film)
- The Gods and Demons of Zu Mountain (1990 Hong Kong TV series)
- The Zu Mountain Saga (1991 Hong Kong TV series)
- The Legend of Zu (2001 Hong Kong film)
- Legend of Zu Mountain (2015 Chinese TV series)
