= Guerrillas' Song =

The "Guerrillas' Song" (simplified Chinese: 游击队歌; traditional Chinese: 游擊隊歌; pinyin: yóu jī duì gē) is a Chinese patriotic song from the Second Sino-Japanese War (called The War of Resistance Against Japan (Chinese: 抗日战争) both in ROC and PRC). It is sung in both mainland China and Taiwan.

The song describes the guerrilla (i.e. the Chinese resistance) fighters in China during the Second Sino-Japanese War. It was written and composed by He Lüting (贺绿汀) in 1937. The melody has some similarities to "The British Grenadiers" (but it is not known if this song has had any direct influence on its melody).

== Lyrics ==
Simplified Chinese	Traditional Chinese	Pinyin	English Translation
我们都是神枪手 每一颗子弹消灭一个敌人 我们都是飞行军 哪怕那山高水又深 在密密的树林里 到处都安排同志们的宿营地 在高高的山岗上 有我们无数的好兄弟 没有吃 没有穿 自有那敌人送上前 没有枪 没有炮 敌人给我们造 我们生长在这里 每一寸土地都是我们自己的 无论谁要抢占去 我们就和他拼到底 哪怕日本强盗凶 我们的弟兄打起来真英勇 哪怕敌人枪炮狠 找不到我们的踪和影 让敌人乱冲闯 我们的阵地建立在敌人侧后方 敌人的战线越延长 我们的队伍越扩张 不分穷 不分富 四万万同胞齐武装 不分党 不分派 大家都来抵抗 我们越打越坚强 日本强盗正在走向灭亡 待到最后胜利日 世界的和平见曙光	我們都是神槍手 每一顆子彈消滅一個敵人 我們都是飛行軍 哪怕那山高水又深 在密密的樹林裡 到處都安排同志們的宿營地 在高高的山崗上 有我們無數的好兄弟 沒有吃 沒有穿 自有那敵人送上前 沒有槍 沒有炮 敵人給我們造 我們生長在這裡 每一寸土地都是我們自己的 無論誰要搶佔去 我們就和他拼到底 哪怕日本強盜兇 我們的弟兄打起來真英勇 哪怕敵人槍炮狠 找不到我們的蹤和影 讓敵人亂衝闖 我們的陣地建立在敵人側後方 敵人的戰線越延長 我們的隊伍越擴張 不分窮 不分富 四萬萬同胞齊武裝 不分黨 不分派 大家都來抵抗 我們越打越堅強 日本強盜正在走向滅亡 待到最後勝利日 世界的和平見曙光	wǒmén dōu shì shén qiāngshǒu měi yī kē zǐdàn xiāomiè yī gè dírén wǒmén dōu shì fēi xíngjūn nǎ pà nà shān gāo shuǐ yòu shēn zài mìmì de shùlín lǐ dàochǔ dōu ānpái tóngzhìmén de sùyíngdì zài gāogāo de shāngǎng shàng yǒu wǒmén wúshù de hǎo xiōngdì méiyǒu chī méiyǒu chuān zìyǒu nà dírén sòngshàng qián méiyǒu qiāng méiyǒu pào dírén gěi wǒmén zào wǒmén shēng zhǎng zài zhèlǐ měi yī cùn tǔdì dōu shì wǒmén zìjǐ de wúlùn sheí yào qiǎngzhàn qù wǒmén jiù hé tā pīn dào dǐ nǎ pà rìběn qiáng dào xiōng wǒmén de dìxiōng dǎqǐlái zhēn yīngyǒng nǎ pà dírén qiāng pào hěn zhǎo bù dào wǒmén de zōng hé yǐng ràng dírén luàn chōngchuǎng wǒmén de zhèndì jiànlì zài dírén cèhòufāng dírén de zhànxiàn yuè yáncháng wǒmén de duìwǔ yuè kuòzhāng bù fēn qióng bù fēn fù sì wàn wàn tóngbāo qí wǔzhuāng bù fēn dǎng bù fēn pai dàjiā dōu lái dǐkàng wǒmén yuè dǎ yuè jiānqiáng rìběn qiángdào zhèng zài zǒu xiàng mièwáng dài dào zuìhòu shènglì rì shìjiè de hépíng jiàn shǔguāng	We are all sharpshooters, Each bullet takes out an enemy. We are all soldiers with wings, Unafraid of tall mountains and deep waters. In the dense forests, Our comrades set their camps. On the tall mountains, Our countless brothers are there. Nothing to eat, nothing to wear? The enemy will supply us. No guns, no cannons? The enemy will forge them for us. We are born in this place Every inch of the land belongs to us. Should anyone invade it, We will fight him to death. Though the Japanese bandits are vicious, Our brothers fight bravely. Though enemy's weapons are powerful, They cannot find our trace and shadow. Let the enemy rush around aimlessly, Our battlefront is behind the enemy. When the enemy line lengthens, Our columns swell even larger. No matter poor or rich, 400 million people become armed. Regardless of political parties and factions, We all join the resistance, We become stronger in the struggle， Japanese bandits are going towards doom. When the day of final victory comes, The dawn of world peace will rise.
