= The Hidden Enforcers =

2002 Hong Kong film by Nam Yin

- Traditional Chinese: 殺手狂龍
- Jyutping: saai3 sau2 kong4 lung4
- Directed by: Nam Yin
- Starring: Sammo Hung; Adia Chan
- Distributed by: B&S Films Distribution Company Limited (Hong Kong)
- Release date: 16 May 2002
- Running time: 87 minutes
- Country: Hong Kong
- Language: Cantonese
- Box office: $54,306

The Hidden Enforcers (Chinese: 殺手狂龍) is a 2002 Hong Kong action film directed by Nam Yin and starring Sammo Hung.

== Plot ==
After a botched drug raid 15 years ago, retired police officer King (Sammo Hung) is now the head of a vigilante group hunting down criminals that killed his fellow officers.

== Cast ==
- Sammo Hung as King a retired vigilante cop
- Nadia Chan as King's vigilante assistant
