= Zu Warriors from the Magic Mountain =

1983 Hong Kong film by Tsui Hark

Zu: Warriors from the Magic Mountain
- Hong Kong promotional release poster

Chinese name
- Traditional Chinese: 新蜀山劍俠
- Simplified Chinese: 新蜀山剑侠
Transcriptions
Standard Mandarin
- Hanyu Pinyin: Xīn Shǔ Shān Jiàn Xiá
Yue: Cantonese
- Jyutping: San1 Suk6 Saan1 Gim3 Hap6
- Directed by: Tsui Hark
- Written by: Shui Chung-yuet; Szeto Cheuk-hon
- Based on: Legend of the Swordsmen of the Mountains of Shu by Huanzhulouzhu
- Produced by: Raymond Chow; Leonard Ho
- Starring: Sammo Hung; Yuen Biao; Brigitte Lin; Adam Cheng; Moon Lee; Judy Ongg
- Cinematography: Bill Wong
- Edited by: Peter Cheung
- Music by: Kwan Sing-yau; Tang Siu-lam
- Production company: Paragon Films, Ltd.
- Distributed by: Golden Harvest
- Release date: 5 February 1983
- Running time: 98 minutes
- Country: Hong Kong
- Language: Cantonese

Zu: Warriors from the Magic Mountain (Chinese: 新蜀山劍俠, released overseas as Zu: Time Warriors) is a 1983 Hong Kong martial arts fantasy film directed by Tsui Hark for Golden Harvest. It stars Yuen Biao, Sammo Hung, Brigitte Lin, Adam Cheng, Mang Hoi, Damian Lau, Moon Lee and Judy Ongg. It is based on 1932 xianxia novel Legend of the Swordsmen of the Mountains of Shu by Huanzhulouzhu.

Though a commercial disappointment on initial release, the film was critically praised and has been cited as a significant work in the Hong Kong New Wave. It received five nominations at the 3rd Hong Kong Film Awards, including for Best Film, Best Action Choreography, and Best Actress (for Brigitte Lin).

Hark later directed another film, The Legend of Zu (2001), based on the same source material.

== Plot ==
During the Sixteen Kingdoms period, Qiao Shu army deserter Dik Ming-kei is being pursued by vampires in the mountain of Zu and is rescued by Master Ding Yan and then becomes his pupil. When they are ambushed by the Blood Devil, devil chaser Siu Yu and his pupil Yat Jan come to their assistance. They manage to hold off the Blood Devil, but they need to find the Dual Swords to destroy him.

Master Ding takes the wounded Siu Yu to Celestial Fort and seeks help from the Mistress, but he is poisoned by the Blood Devil and surrenders to the Dark Force. Will Ming-kei and Yat Jan find the Dual Swords and destroy the Blood Devil?

== Cast ==
- Yuen Biao as Dik Ming-kei
- Adam Cheng as Ding Yan
- Mang Hoi as Yat Jan
- Sammo Hung as Chang Mei / Red Army soldier
- Norman Chui as Heaven's Blade
- Brigitte Lin as Ice Queen
- Damian Lau as Siu Yu
- Moon Lee as Mu Sang
- Corey Yuen as Devil Disciple Leader
- Chung Fat and Dick Wei as Blue Army Commanders
- Judy Ongg as Lady Li I-chi
- Ha Kwong-li as Chi Wu-chuang
- Fung Hak-on as a Devil Disciple
- Sai Gwa-Pau as the boatman
- Tsui Hark as a Blue Army soldier

International version only

- Jonathan Spalter as Tony
- Alex Fleming as Alex
- Oliver Albrecht as Oliver
- Dani Bishop as Fortune teller
- Leslie Clarke as Curator
- Ken Brown as George
- Jimmy Shaw as Fencing coach

== Production ==
The film was produced and distributed by Golden Harvest, with Leonard Ho putting forward HK$30 Million towards its production, making it the most expensive film ever made in Hong Kong at the time.

Director Tsui Hark hired out western special effects artists such as Robert Balack, famous for his work with ILM and Disney's Tron to act as consultants and help train Hong Kong film students to create the special effects required for the film, such as miniatures, optical compositing, rotoscoping, and matte painting.

== Release ==
=== International version ===
Golden Harvest demanded changes for the international export market, having Tsui Hark shoot additional scenes to bookend the film and recontextualize it as a dream sequence from Yuen Biao, who plays a college student learning about Chinese history. This version was released overseas as Zu: Time Warriors.

=== Home media ===
The U.K. release of the DVD by Hong Kong Legends features an audio commentary with Tsui Hark and film critic Bey Logan.

The Hong Kong release of the DVD by Fortune Star Media features the Cantonese version of the film's trailer, as well as an interview with actor Yuen Biao.

The film has been released on Blu-Ray by Eureka Entertainment and Shout Factory.

== Reception ==
=== Critical response ===
In a 1991 Fangoria article by Tim Paxton and Dave Todarello, Zu: Warriors from the Magic Mountain is referred to as "a film which freely intertwines Chinese myth and lore with Hollywood special FX and comic-book action. It's the proverbial rollercoaster of kung fu, magic, monsters, humor, tension, visual spectacle and gruesome bits."

Craig Lines of Den of Geek wrote that Zu: Warriors from the Magic Mountain "was a significant film for the Hong Kong New Wave movement that revolutionized the industry in the late '70s", characterized by "young filmmakers [who] broke free from the traditional studio system to create weird, energetic and experimental movies". Lines praised the actors' performances and the martial arts choreography, and noted the film's "warm, full-hearted message of kindness and acceptance".

The film has a 100% positive rating on Rotten Tomatoes, from 13 critical reviews.

=== Box office ===
Despite its critical praise, the film was a financial failure, grossing an estimated HK$3 Million on a budget of HK$30 Million in its original theatrical run.

=== Awards and nominations ===
Event	Date of ceremony	Category	Nominee(s)	Result
3rd Hong Kong Film Awards	4 August 1984	Best Film		Nominated
3rd Hong Kong Film Awards	4 August 1984	Best Actress	Brigitte Lin	Nominated
3rd Hong Kong Film Awards	4 August 1984	Best Editing	Peter Cheung	Nominated
3rd Hong Kong Film Awards	4 August 1984	Best Art Direction	William Chang	Nominated
3rd Hong Kong Film Awards	4 August 1984	Best Action Choreography	Corey Yuen	Nominated

== Legacy and influence ==
John Carpenter has cited Zu: Warriors From the Magic Mountain as being responsible for the visual design of his film Big Trouble in Little China. Sam Raimi cited its imaginative and effective special effects on a relatively low budget as an influence for Evil Dead II.

Hark's 2001 film, The Legend of Zu, adapts the same source novel, though it is not strictly a remake.
