= The Wandering Songstress =

Song by Zhou Xuan
- Released: 1937
- Genre: Shidaiqu
- Length: 2:31
- Composer: He Luting
- Lyricist: Tian Han

"Tianya genü" (Chinese: 天涯歌女; pinyin: Tiānyá gēnǚ), or "The Wandering Songstress", is one of two theme songs from the 1937 Chinese film Street Angel; the other being the "Four Seasons Song" (Chinese: 四季歌; pinyin: Sì jì gē). It was composed by He Luting based on an older Suzhou ballad, with lyrics by Tian Han. The song was sung by Zhou Xuan in the film, playing the role of Xiao Hong.

It is one of the most notable of the Chinese popular songs from the 30s and 40s, and has been described as a song that has "a lingering fame" in China like "As Time Goes By" from the 1942 film Casablanca in the United States. The song has also been described as "a classic Chinese love song".

== Song title ==
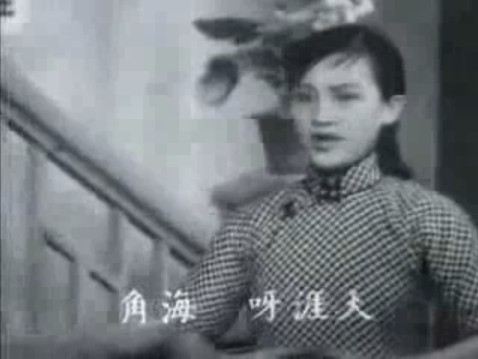
Zhou Xuan singing "The Wandering Songstress" in Street Angel

In the film, this song was called "Tianya Ge", "The Wandering Song" (Chinese: 天涯歌; pinyin: Tiānyá gē), but became better known as "Tianya Genü" ("Ge" means "song" and "Genü" means "singing girl" or "songstress"). "Tianya Genü" has been translated in various English sources as "The Wandering Songstress", "Singing Girl", "The Songstress of the World", "The Wandering Singer", "Singer at the Sky Edge", and "Singing Girl at the Edge of the World". The varying translations came from the different possible readings of the song title. "Tianya" (Chinese: 天涯) literally means "sky horizon" that carries the meaning of "at the end of the world", but within the context of the song it also has the figurative meanings of "someone separated by a long distance" from the phrase "tianya haijiao" (天涯海角, "ends of the world", used in a Tang dynasty poem that describes someone wandering looking for a person far away), which is part of the lyrics that describe someone seeking to find her intended.

"The Wandering Songstress" (天涯歌女)
A short excerpt from the song "The Wandering Songstress" by Zhou Xuan.

== Composition and orchestration ==
According to the composer He Luting, the director of the film Street Angel found two urban folk ballads from Suzhou he wanted to use in the film, "Crying on the Seventh Seven Day Cycle" (哭七七) and "One Who Knows Me Well" (知心客), which He Luting then adapted to become "Song of the Four Season" (四季歌) and "The Wandering Songstress" respectively. The songs were arranged according to principles of Western music composition.

"The Wandering Songstress" was performed in a traditional Chinese vocal style, accompanied by Chinese music instruments such as erhu, pipa, and sanxian in the manner of a Jiangnan ballad. According to He, the recording was done quickly as Zhou Xuan grasped the idea of how the song should be performed very quickly.

== Popular usage ==
"The Wandering Songstress" is often used in film soundtracks, usually in Chinese language films, but also in some Western language films, for example in the 2006 ensemble film Paris, je t'aime and its 2009 sequel, New York, I Love You.

One of its most notable uses in films is in Ang Lee's 2007 film Lust, Caution, in which it is sung by Tang Wei who played the role of Wong Chia Chi.

When it is used in the film Lust, Caution, its "pathos and poignancy" is strengthened by the evidence of the Japanese occupation in the film's setting. The Oxford Handbook of Chinese Cinemas says the song's use in Street Angel was an attempt to replace "the old 'vulgar' connotations of shidaiqu with feelings of national awareness", while its use in Lust, Caution was "a defiant expression" of shidaiqu under Japanese occupation.

== Cover versions ==
The song has been covered by numerous singers, including Li Xianglan in the 1944 Japanese film Yasen gungakutai (野戦軍楽隊, Military Combat Music Band), Bai Guang, Teresa Teng, Tsai Chin, Wakin Chau, Adia Chan (in Cantonese), Lin Bao (林寶, in Shanghainese), Song Zuying, Zhang Yan (張燕).
