= Song Bird (TV series) =

- Genre: Historical drama
- Created by: Siu Sang
- Starring: Nadia Chan; Leon Lai
- Opening theme: 歲月留聲 performed by Nadia Chan, composed by Joseph Koo
- Country of origin: Hong Kong
- Original language: Cantonese
- No. of episodes: 20

Production
- Producer: Siu Sang
- Running time: 45 minutes per episode

Original release
- Network: TVB
- Release: 25 December 1989 – 1990

Song Bird (天涯歌女) is a historical drama television series produced by TVB and broadcast in Hong Kong in 1989. The story is based on the life of shidaiqu singer Zhou Xuan. The Chinese name of the TV series comes from the name of one of the songs used in the 1937 film Street Angel.

== Plot ==
The story is based on the story of the young girl Zhou Xuan (Nadia Chan) in the Republic of China 1930s era. Zhou originally came from a poor background. She managed to join the Bright Moonlight Song and Dance Troupe to try to make a living, and met composer Yim Chi-wah (Leon Lai). A record producer recognized her skill, and helped her launch a music career in a very difficult time.

The backdrop of the falling Republic of China led to the collapse of the Shanghai shidaiqu music industry. Zhou Xuan would suffer from a mental breakdown and die at an early age, but her music would make her a legend.

== Production ==
Throughout the series, the songs performed were mostly sung in Cantonese. The songs used in the series did not actually reflect the Mandarin songs from the era. The producer of the series Siu Xiao (蕭笙) had to incorporate some well known modern Cantopop composers such as Joseph Koo, Cheng Kwok-kong (鄭國江), Pun Wai-yuen (潘偉源) into readapting some of the songs for the story. Lyrics and melodies were changed.

The series was also accompanied by a soundtrack released with leading actress Nadia Chan in 1990 using the same name, Song Bird. In the album Deric Wan replaced Leon Lai. According to IFPI the album had sales figures that were impressive enough to be in competition with one of Alan Tam's main album at the time. The album was later re-released as part of Crown Records' (娛樂唱片) 50th anniversary gold disc series.

== Cast ==
| Cast | Role | Note |
|---|---|---|
| Nadia Chan | Zhou Xuan (周小紅) | |
| Leon Lai | Yim Chi-wah (嚴子華 /嚴華) | |
| Tam Ping-man (譚炳文) | | Father of Zhou Xuan |
| Helen Ma (馬海倫) | | |
| (梁愛) | | |
| Eddie Kwan (關禮傑) | | |
| (曾慧雲) | | |
| May Wu (胡美儀) | | |
| Lau Jing-hung (柳影紅) | | |
| (陳榮峻) | | |
| Gregory Charles Rivers | | |
| Johnny Yip (葉振棠) | | |
| Lee Long-kay (李龍基) | | |
| Aaron Kwok | | extras |
| Wayne Lai | | extras |

== See also ==
- C-pop
- Forever Love Song
