= Zhou Xuan =

Chinese singer and actress (1920–1957)

- 周璇
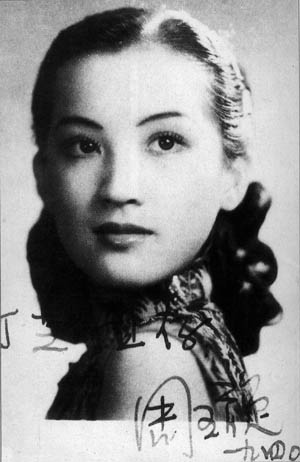
- Zhou in 1940
- Born: Su Pu (蘇璞); August 1, 1920; Changzhou, Jiangsu, Republic of China
- Died: September 22, 1957 (aged 37); Shanghai, People's Republic of China
- Occupations: Singer, actress
- Years active: 1932–1954
- Spouses: Yan Hua (m. 1938; div. 1941) Tang Di (m. 1951; div. 1952)
- Partner(s): Shi Hui (1947–1948); Zhu Huaide (1948–1950)
- Children: Zhou Min (son, with Zhu Huaide?); Zhou Wei (son, with Tang Di)
- Musical career
- Also known as: Golden Voice (金嗓子)
- Origin: Shanghai, China
- Genres: Shidaiqu

Chinese name
- Chinese: 周璇
Transcriptions
Standard Mandarin
- Hanyu Pinyin: Zhōu Xuán
- IPA: [ʈʂóʊ ɕɥɛ̌n]

Zhou Xiaohong (traditional Chinese: 周小紅; simplified Chinese: 周小红; pinyin: Zhōu Xiǎohóng; Wade–Giles: Chou^{1} Hsiao^{3}hung^{2}; born Su Pu; (Note: Traditional Chinese: 蘇璞; simplified Chinese: 苏璞; pinyin: Sū Pú; Wade–Giles: Su^{1} Pʻu^{2}.) August 1, 1920 – September 22, 1957), known professionally as Zhou Xuan (Chinese: 周璇; pinyin: Zhōu Xuán), also romanized as Chow Hsuan (Wade–Giles: Chou^{1} Hsüan^{2}), was a Chinese singer and film actress. By the 1940s, she had become one of China's Seven Great Singing Stars. Nicknamed the "Golden Voice" (金嗓子; Jīn sǎng zi), she was the best known of the seven, and had a concurrent movie career until 1954. She recorded more than 200 songs and appeared in over 40 films in her career.

== Early life ==
Zhou Xuan's original name was Su Pu. She was born on August 1, 1920 in an intellectual family in Wujin. Her father, Su Diaofu, graduated from Jinling University and worked as a pastor and teacher. Her mother, Gu Meizhen, graduated from Jinling Women's University. When Zhou Xuan was young, she was abducted to Jintang County by her opium-addicted uncle and separated from her biological parents. When she was six years old, she was adopted by the Zhou family in Shanghai and changed her name to Zhou Xiaohong. Her adoptive father was Zhou Wending and her adoptive mother was Ye Fengmei.

At the age of 13, she took Zhou Xuan as her stage name, xuán (璇) meaning 'beautiful jade' in Chinese.

== Career ==
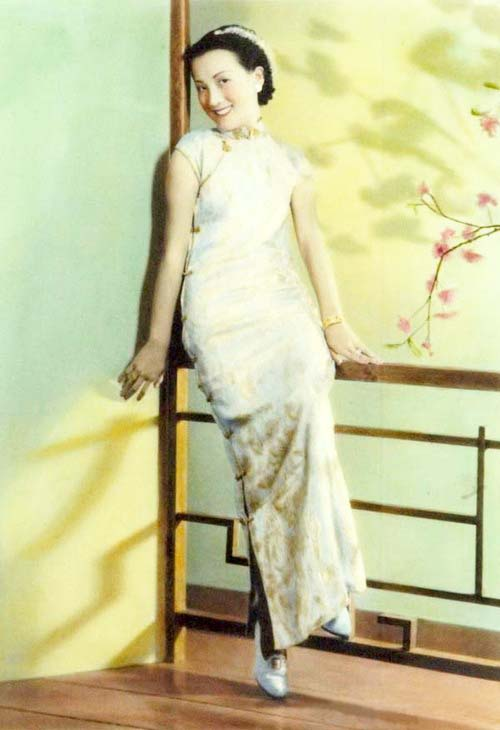
A hand-coloured photo of Zhou in the 1930s.

In 1932, Zhou began acting as a member of Li Jinhui's Bright Moon Song and Dance Troupe. When she was 12, she won second prize in a singing contest in Shanghai and was given the nickname "Golden Voice" (金嗓子) for her effortless high-pitched melodies.

Zhou began her film career in 1935, and she achieved stardom in 1937 when director Yuan Muzhi cast her as one of the leads as a singing girl in Street Angel. Zhou rapidly became the most famous and marketable popular singer in the gramophone era up to her death, singing many famous tunes from her own movies.

Between 1946 and 1950, she often went to Hong Kong to make films such as "All-Consuming Love" (長相思), "Hua wai liu ying" (花外流鶯), Sorrows of the Forbidden City, and "Rainbow Song" (彩虹曲). After introducing "Shanghai Nights" (夜上海) in 1949, Zhou returned to Shanghai. She spent the next few years in and out of mental institutions owing to frequent breakdowns. Through the years, Zhou led a complicated and unhappy life marked by her failed marriages, illegitimate children, and suicide attempts. Zhou's first husband was the composer Yan Hua (嚴華, 1912–1992), who wrote and sometimes also performed songs with her.

Despite having made a total of 43 movies, her most well-known performance remained the 1937 film, Street Angel. This contained two theme songs: "Four Seasons Song" (四季歌) and "The Wandering Songstress", which enjoyed long-lasting popularity. Other well-known songs by Zhou Xuan include "When Will You Return?", "Shanghai Nights" (title song from the film of the same name), "Yellow Leaves Dancing in the Autumn Wind" (黃葉舞秋風), "Eternal Smile" (永遠的微笑), "Hundred Flower Song" (百花歌), "Advice" (叮嚀), "Where Can the Soul Mate be Found" (知音何處尋), and "Picking Betel Nuts" (採檳榔).

== Personal life ==
In the autumn of 1936, Zhou Xuan and composer Yan Hua officially got engaged. On July 10, 1938, Zhou Xuan and Yan Hua held their wedding at the Spring Garden Hotel in Beijing. Zhou Xuan and Yan Hua's marriage lasted only three years because both parties suspected that the other had an affair due to rumors. After several quarrels, Zhou Xuan even ran away from home. In 1941, Zhou Xuan and Yan Hua divorced.

After divorcing Yan Hua, Zhou Xuan never married again. Zhou Xuan's second public relationship was with Shi Hui, but they broke up soon. The third public relationship was cohabitation with silk merchant Zhu Huaide . There is a saying that Zhu Huaide deceived Zhou Xuan with sweet words and cheated her of her feelings and part of her property. In 1950, after Zhou Xuan returned to Shanghai with her pregnancy, she published a statement in the newspaper, breaking up with Zhu Huaide; at the end of the year, Zhou Xuan's eldest son Zhou Min was born. Zhou Xuan's fourth public lover was Tang Di, who worked as an artist . In May 1952, Zhou Xuan was about to marry art teacher Tang Di, but Tang Di was sentenced to three years in prison by the Jing'an District People's Court on charges of fraud and seduction; in the same year, Zhou Xuan's second son Zhou Wei was born.

== Death ==
In 1957, she died in Shanghai in a mental asylum at the age of 37. A possible cause of death may be encephalitis following a nervous breakdown. Zhou's diary concluded that she suffered from cerebritis.

Zhou Xuan was survived by two sons, Zhou Min and Zhou Wei, born of different fathers. Zhou Min was widely believed to be the son of the businessman Zhu Huaide, who left for Shanghai in 1950 after Zhou Xuan entrusted him with her savings and never returned; Zhou Min was born in that same year. According to her elder son Zhou Min's biography, her younger son, Zhou Wei, was the son of the art designer Tang Di (唐棣), while the biological father of Zhou Min himself was not revealed.

Zhou Wei currently lives in Toronto, where he performs at times in the TTC subways and participates in various musical projects, including teaching. He is a flautist. He has two daughters, both musicians. The elder of the two, Zhou Xiaoxuan, is a classical pianist trained at Concordia University and now living in Beijing. The youngest, Amanda Zhou, is taking a similar path as an actress and has already worked on a few shows and films.

== Cultural legacy ==
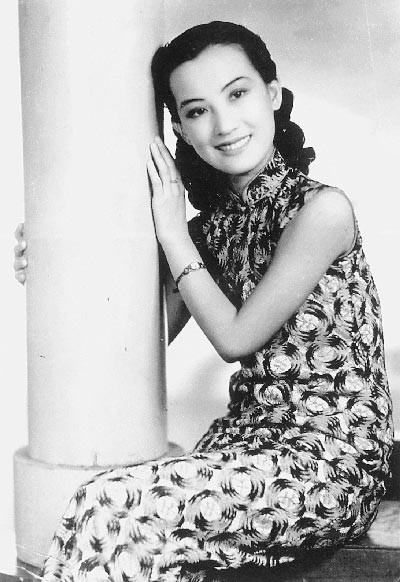
Zhou Xuan

To this day, Zhou Xuan's songs still remain a staple in many Golden Oldies collections in Mandarin popular music.

There have been two biographies written by Zhou Xuan's surviving family members. The book My Mother Zhou Xuan (我的媽媽周璇) was written by Zhou Wei and his wife Chang Jing (常晶); while a later book, Zhou Xuan Diary (周璇日記), was written by Zhou Min.

=== Television ===
An adaptation of the life of Zhou Xuan was produced in TVB's Song Bird (1989), starring Adia Chan as Zhou Xuan and Leon Lai as her lover. In this series, Xuan's songs were re-written in Cantonese and sung by Chan. She sang duets with Lai in the program while under Crown Records (娛樂唱片). Deric Wan replaced Lai's vocals on the soundtrack album.

Another adaptation, based on Zhou Wei's biography, is the Chinese serial titled Zhou Xuan (周璇), starring Cecilia Cheung. This version of the story was accused by Zhou Wei as a false representation of Zhou Xuan and damaging to the reputation of the Zhou family.

== Filmography ==
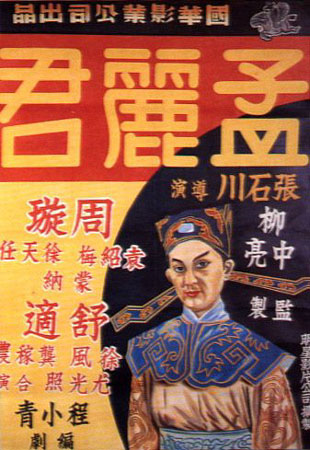
Poster of the film Meng Lijun (1940)

- 狂歡之夜 (1935)
- Street Angel (馬路天使, 1937)
- Romance of the West Chamber (西廂記, 1940)
- Meng Lijun (孟麗君, 1940)
- Dream of the Red Chamber (紅樓夢, 1944)
- Night Inn (夜店, 1947)
- An All-Consuming Love (長相思, 1947)
- Sorrows of the Forbidden City (清宮秘史, 1948)
- Orioles Banished from the Flowers (花外流鶯, 1948)
- Song of a Songstress (歌女之歌, 1948)
- Waste Not Our Youth (莫負青春, 1949)
- The Flower Street (花街, 1950)

== See also ==
- C-pop, an overview of Chinese popular music
  - Mandopop, the Mandarin-language subgenre
  - Cantopop, for popular music performed in Cantonese
- Seven Great Singing Stars
