= The Zu Mountain Saga =

1991 Hong Kong television drama

- Genre: Wuxia, fantasy, romance, drama
- Based on: Legend of the Swordsmen of the Mountains of Shu by Huanzhulouzhu
- Starring: Ekin Cheng; Nadia Chan; Law Lok-lam; Jimmy Au
- Opening theme: 正義柔情永在 by Deric Wan and Nadia Chan
- Country of origin: Hong Kong
- Original language: Cantonese
- No. of episodes: 20

Production
- Running time: 45 minutes per episode

Original release
- Network: TVB Jade
- Release: 22 July – 16 August 1991

Related
- The Gods and Demons of Zu Mountain

The Zu Mountain Saga
- Traditional Chinese: 蜀山奇俠之仙侶奇緣
- Simplified Chinese: 蜀山奇侠之仙侣奇缘
Transcriptions
Standard Mandarin
- Hanyu Pinyin: Shu Shan Qi Xia Zhi Xian Lu Qi Yuan
Yue: Cantonese
- Jyutping: Suet San Kay Hup Zhi Sin Lok Kay Yuen

The Zu Mountain Saga (Chinese: 蜀山奇俠之仙侶奇緣) was a 20-episode Hong Kong television drama series that aired on Television Broadcasts Limited (TVB) Cantonese-language Jade Channel between 22 July and 16 August 1991. It was aired in India in 1996 on Home TV channel and gained huge popularity with many times repeat telecast due to fame.

Starring local actors, it was a loose sequel to The Gods and Demons of Zu Mountain (蜀山奇俠) that aired in 1990.

== Synopsis ==
The story take place a hundred years after The Gods and Demons of Zu Mountain.

Evil has been reborn in the Zu Mountain, who is ostracized by his village, as a demon. He meets Yu Ying Nam and Wo Mei Pai and from there they face many challenges that would question evil and good.

== Cast ==
Main Characters

- Adia Chan - Yu Ying Nan, the current eldest female disciple of the Zu Mountain Sect.
- Ekin Cheng - Shi Sheng, the present reincarnation of the Blood Demon.
- Law Lok Lam - the Supreme Wizard and the current leader of the demon sect.
- Lily Chung Shuk Wai - Cui Ying
- Jimmy Au - Sheng Tu Hong

Support Characters

- Lau Kong - A demonic scholar who tries to turn Shi Sheng to the dark side and use him for his own goals. Ironically, he was killed by Shi Sheng.
- Helena Law - Current leader of the Zu Mountain Sect and the mentor of Yu Ying Nan.
- Chan On Ying - Lai Guo
- Tsang Kong Sen - Sun Nan

Guest Star

- Eddie Kwan - Sheung Guan Ging Er, the Blood Demon from Episode 1 of The Gods and Demons of Zu Mountain
