= Sorrows of the Forbidden City =

Sorrows of the Forbidden City (Secret History of the Qing Court)
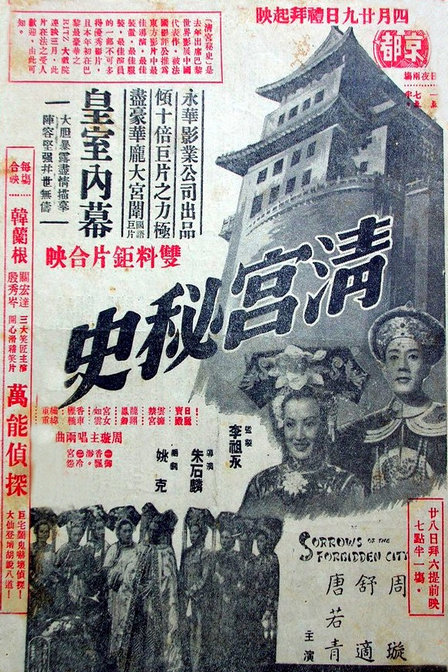
- Film poster
- Directed by: Zhu Shilin
- Written by: Yao Ke (姚克)
- Produced by: Li Zu-yong
- Starring: Shu Shi; Zhou Xuan; Tang Ruojing; Hong Bo
- Cinematography: Chuang Kuo-Chun
- Edited by: Wang Zhao-Xi
- Music by: Zhang Zheng-Fan; Lu Zhong-Ren
- Production company: Yonghua Motion Picture Studios Ltd.
- Release date: 1948
- Running time: 90 minutes
- Country: China
- Language: Mandarin
- Budget: US$1,000,000

Sorrows of the Forbidden City (Chinese: 清宮秘史; pinyin: Qīng gōng mìshǐ; lit. 'Secret History of the Qing Court') is a Mandarin Chinese film released in 1948. It was directed by Zhu Shilin and filmed in Hong Kong. After the founding of the People's Republic of China in 1949, the film was criticized as "treasonous" for its positive depiction of the Emperor. However, its reputation has risen in recent years, and it was ranked as the 37th best Chinese film of all time in the Hong Kong Film Awards poll of 2013.

== Synopsis ==
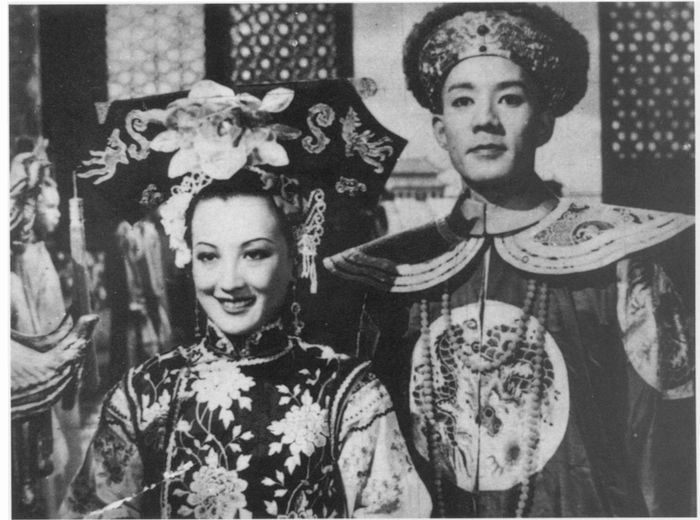
Zhou Xuan as Imperial Concubine Zhen and Shu Shi as Emperor Guangxu

This film is a historical drama set in the imperial court in the closing years of the Qing dynasty (late 19th and early 20th century). The Empress Dowager Cixi wielded effective power during much of this period, having staged a coup in 1861 that made her regent over the infant Emperor Tongzhi and then, after his death, the young Emperor Guangxu. Cixi went into retirement in 1889 and the Emperor Guangxu ruled in his own right for the first time. He instituted the famous Hundred Days' Reform, aimed at strengthening and modernizing China. However, Cixi opposed the changes, so she staged a second coup, putting Guangxu under house arrest for the remainder of his life. This film plays on what has become the common understanding of events, according to which Cixi was extremely reactionary and concerned with maintaining her own power, even at the expense of China. However, this narrative has been questioned by some historians.

The protagonists of the film are the Emperor Guangxu (who is presented as benevolent and wise, but constrained by the filial piety he owes the Empress Dowager) and Imperial Concubine Zhen (who bravely encourages him to resist the Empress Dowager).

1889

In the first scene, Guangxu (Shu Shi) is invited to choose his wife from among the ladies at court. However, when he tries to choose the woman he loves, Cixi (Tang Ruojing) browbeats him into choosing someone else. The woman he loves is relegated to being a concubine, Imperial Concubine Zhen (Zhou Yun).

1900

This is the year when the Boxers, in the name of defending the Qing dynasty, murdered large numbers of foreigners and Chinese Christians and besieged the Foreign Legation Quarter in Beijing.

== Cast ==
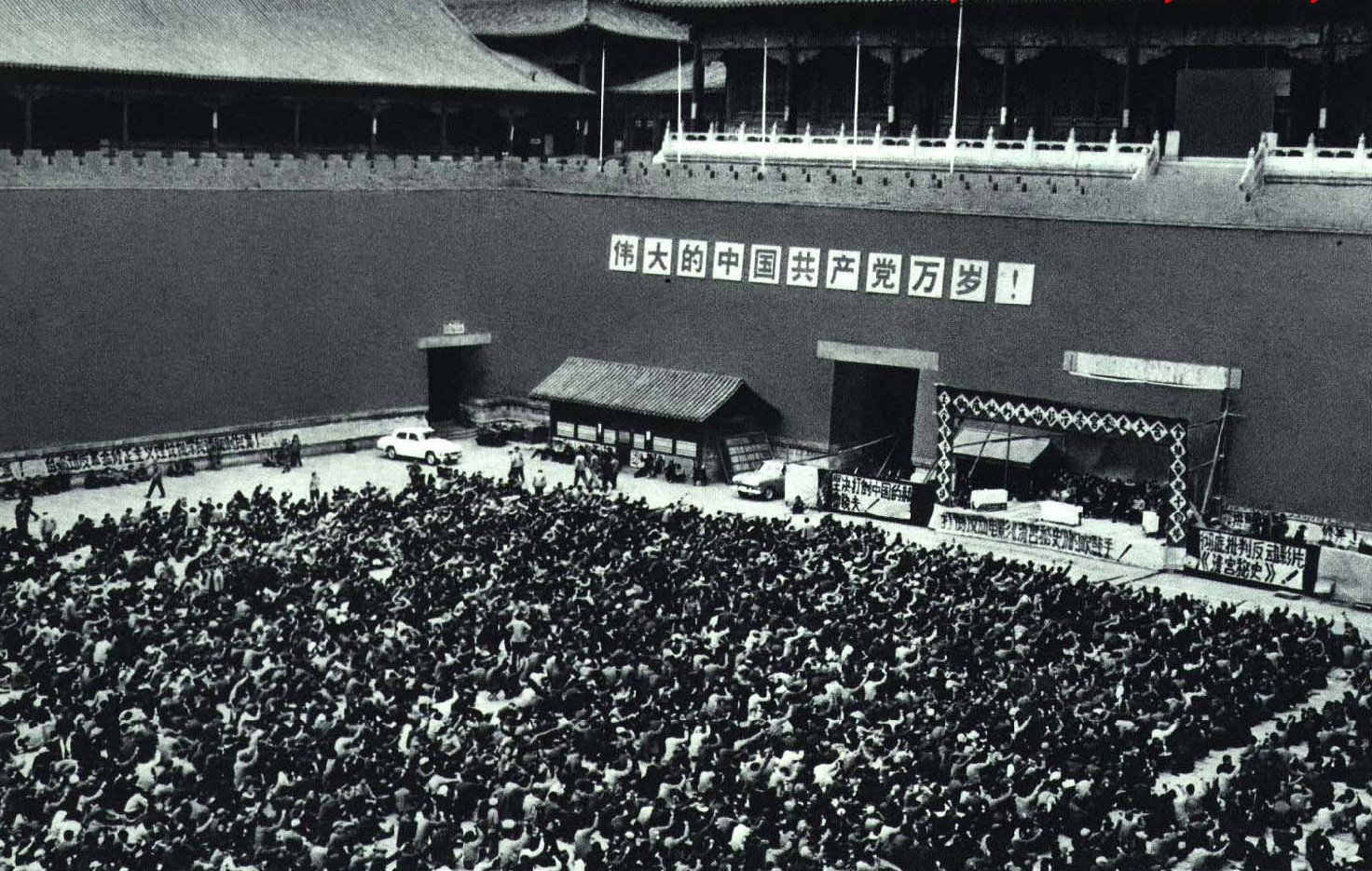
A mass struggle session denouncing Sorrows of the Forbidden City outside the Meridian Gate of the Forbidden City in 1967 during the Cultural Revolution. Mao Zedong criticized the film for depicting the emperor as patriotic. Qi Benyu used the film to attack Liu Shaoqi.

- Shu Shi 舒适 as Emperor Guangxu
- Zhou Xuan as Consort Zhen
- Tang Ruojing 唐若菁 as Empress Dowager Cixi
- Hong Bo 洪波 as Li Lianying

== DVD releases ==
Sorrows of the Forbidden City was released on DVD by Guangzhou Beauty Culture Communication Co., Ltd., in 2006.
