= The Gods and Demons of Zu Mountain =

1990 Hong Kong television series

- Genre: Wuxia, fantasy
- Based on: Legend of the Swordsmen of the Mountains of Shu by Huanzhulouzhu
- Starring: Eddie Kwan; Aaron Kwok; Pauline Yeung; Mimi Kung
- Opening theme: Nin Siu Mou Ching (年少無情) performed by Jacky Cheung and Shirley Kwan
- Ending theme: Bat Yuen Zoi Chin Min (不願再纏綿) performed by Jacky Cheung
- Composer: Joseph Koo
- Country of origin: Hong Kong
- Original language: Cantonese
- No. of episodes: 20

Production
- Running time: 45 minutes per episode

Original release
- Network: TVB Jade
- Release: 28 May – 22 June 1990

Related
- The Zu Mountain Saga

The Gods and Demons of Zu Mountain
- Traditional Chinese: 蜀山奇俠
- Simplified Chinese: 蜀山奇侠
Transcriptions
Standard Mandarin
- Hanyu Pinyin: Shǔ Shān Qí Xiá
Yue: Cantonese
- Jyutping: Suk6 Saan1 Kei4 Hap6

The God and the Demons of Zu Mountain is a Hong Kong television series. It was first run on TVB in 1990. A following loose sequel, The Zu Mountain Saga (蜀山奇俠之仙侶奇緣) was released in 1991.

== Synopsis ==
The Good triumphs over evil. This is the story of the two sides, battling for supremacy. Under the fighting, there is romance, and angst.

== Cast ==
Main Characters

- Eddie Kwan – Sheung Guan Ging Er (Current eldest male disciple of the Zu Mountain Sect) → Blood Demon
- Aaron Kwok – Yim Gum Sim (Current second eldest male disciple of the Zu Mountain Sect)
- Pauline Yeung – Li Zi King (New disciple of the Zu Mountain Sect), Love Interest of Sheung Guan Ging Er
- Anita Lee (Yuan Wah) – Zhou Qing Wan (disciple of the Wong Mountain)
- Mimi Kung – Sa Yim Hong (leader of the Zodiac Sect)

Supporting Characters

- Jimmy Au – Au Yeung Ping – Former member of the demon sect
- Lau Kong – Master Miu Yi (Sect Leader of the Zu Mountain Sect)
- Ng Sui Ting – Laughing Monk
- Chu Tik Wor – Green Robe Devil – Leader of the demon sect
- Danny Summer (Ha Siu Sing) – Ding Yin (Blood Demon). Former disciple of previous generation of Zu Mountain Sect. Attempted to absorb Blood Demonic power to become more powerful by taking evil ways which he succeed in his second attempt.
- Wong Yi Kum – Yim Ling Wan (Current eldest female disciple of the Zu Mountain Sect)
- Lau Sau Ping – Qing Han Shang – The oldest of the two Qing sisters.
- Chan Pui San – Qing Han Org – the youngest of the two Qing sisters. Love Interest of Yim Gum Sim
- Chan Ha – mistress (leader of the Wong Mountain). Mentor of Zhou Qing Wan
