= Man in Blues =

2003 Hong Kong film by Yip Wai Ying

- Traditional Chinese: 男人之苦
- Simplified Chinese: 男人之苦
- Hanyu Pinyin: Nán Rén Zhī Kǔ
- Jyutping: Naam4 Jan2 Zi1 Fu2
- Directed by: Yip Wai Ying
- Produced by: Nam Yin
- Starring: Wayne Lai; Nadia Chan
- Cinematography: Mike Pang
- Music by: Mak Chun Hung
- Release date: 2003
- Running time: 91 minutes
- Country: Hong Kong
- Language: Cantonese

Man in Blues is a 2003 Hong Kong comedy-drama film directed by Yip Wai Ying and starring Wayne Lai and Nadia Chan. This film was rated Category III in Hong Kong.

== Plot ==
Jackie Lai (Wayne Lai), a famous erotic movie star, decides to quit his career in order to take better care of his daughter Winsy (Jenny Shing). He hires his neighbor Pearl (Nadia Chan) to tutor Winsy. While then, he slowly wins Pearl's approval despite her aversion to his sordid past.

== Cast ==
- Wayne Lai as Jackie Lai
- Nadia Chan as Pearl Ho
- Jenny Shing as Winsy Lai
- Jenny Yam as Judy Low
- Bobby Yip as Kim Tai Chi
- Donna Chu as Maggie
- Lee Siu-kei as Director Chan
- Charlie Cho as Boss Chow
- Kau Man Lung as Brother Nine
- Cheng Chu Fung as Mr. Wong
- Eddie Chan as Brother Fung
- Jameson Lam as Director Lam
- Eileen Yeung
- Wilson Ng
