= Snow.Wolf.Lake =

Snow.Wolf.Lake 雪狼湖
- Music: Guo Sai Cheung, Dick Lee, Iskandar Ismail, Lam Ming Yeung
- Lyrics: Lam, Jang Keung, Albert Leung, Choo, Sin Man, Jacky Cheung
- Productions: 1997 Hong Kong Singapore Taiwan

Snow.Wolf.Lake (Chinese: 雪狼湖) is Hong Kong's first modern musical. Jacky Cheung, a cantopop artist, was the artistic director of the show and also played character Wolf in the musical. The running time of the musical is about three hours. It has two versions: Cantonese and Mandarin. The title combines the Chinese name of the two main characters, "Wolf", the male protagonist, and "Snow", the female protagonist. "Lake" refers to a plot related element.

== Productions ==
Snow.Wolf.Lake opened in Hong Kong Coliseum on 28 March 1997 for a total of 42 shows. The original version of the musical is in Cantonese and Standard Mandarin. Every showing was sold out.

The musical later played in Singapore and also received critical success there, breaking attendance records. The last showing of Snow.Wolf.Lake was on January 7, 2006, in the Beijing Capital Gymnasium for a total of 103 performances.

== Main cast and characters ==
Cantonese version

- Wu, Long or 胡狼 (Jacky Cheung) – Gardener for the Ling family, who falls in love with Ling, Jing-Shu.
- Ling, Jing-Shu or 寧靜雪 (Sandy Lam in Hong Kong, then Nadia Chan in Singapore) – Second daughter of the Ling family, who falls in love with Wu.
- Ling, Yuk-Fung or 寧玉鳳 (Kit Chan) – Eldest daughter of the Ling family, who also falls in love with Wu.
- Leung, Jik or 梁直 (Michael Tse) – A wealthy bachelor who loves Ling, Jing-Shu. Their marriage is arranged by her parents to bring the Ling family out of financial trouble.

Mandarin Version

- Wu, Long or 胡狼 (played by Cheung)
- Ling, Jing-Shu or 宁静雪 (played by Tong Chiang in the showings in Hong Kong, then Evonne Hsu for the remainder of the tour)
- Ling, Yuk-Fung or 宁玉凤 (played by Kit Chan, then Nadia Chan)
- Leung, Jik or 梁直 (played by Yu Yiy or 于毅)

== Synopsis ==
Act I: Wu's introverted character prevents him from making friends with anyone except flowers. Unexpectedly, his gentle nature attracts the attention of both the daughters of the Ling house, for which Wu works. Jing Shu's outgoing nature makes it easy for her to get close to Wu, leaving the quieter Yuk-Fung to watch the two from a distance. One night, Wu and Shu gaze up at the sky and see a shooting star; they exchange wishes for the future. Shu wants to be a violinist, and Wu wants to nurture a unique brand of flower that can be a true embodiment of love. On another night, Wu and Shu meet on a boat sailing on a lake. Shu tells Wu that there is a music school by a lake in Vienna, where Shu wishes to study. Wu says that he will go wherever she wishes to go and nurture by the lake his special brand of flower that he names the "Snow of tranquility" (Shu's name—宁静雪 means snow).

Leung Jik tricks Wu into setting a fire the Valentine's Day carnival.

Act II: A long time has passed since the carnival. Fung has been patiently waiting for Wu even though she knows Wu will never forget Shu.

On Silent Night, Wu sees Shu from a distance on a street in Vienna, but he fails to catch up with her. The next morning, news fills the streets of Vienna that a famous violinist, Ling Jing-Shu has died; her body was found at the bottom of a lake.

== Recording ==
The cast recording of Snow.Wolf.Lake does not include the voice of Sandy Lam due to copyright issues. Instead, Carol Chan from Hong Kong sings the role of Jing-Shu (宁静雪). In 2006 Cheung was nominated for Best Mandarin Male Singer at the 17th Golden Melody Awards for his work on the album (雪狼湖創意音樂劇).
