= Forever Love Song =

- Genre: modern drama
- Country of origin: Hong Kong
- Original language: Cantonese
- No. of episodes: 30

Production
- Production location: Hong Kong
- Running time: 1 hour

Original release
- Network: ATV

Forever Love Song (Chinese: 曲終情未了) is a 1998 ATV drama series produced in Hong Kong. The story behind the main character Monica Mui is loosely based on that of Anita Mui. Names were changed and fictional elements were added.

== Synopsis ==
The story is based on the music career of a singer named Monica Mui who started out by winning a singing competition. Soon Mui would be recognized as one of the best singers by fans and rise to the top of the industry. But the competing record companies would do anything to make sure she failed. Eventually both Mui and her manager would experience difficult hardships with family, work and other romance issues.

== Cast ==
Cast	Role	Note
Alice Lau (劉雅麗)	Monica Mui Lai-kwan(梅麗君)	supposed to be Anita Mui
Frankie Lam	To Ching-wan (杜青雲)	
Kenneth Chan	Wong Pui-kee	Manager
Lawrence Yan (甄志強)	Keung Wai	
Yuen Kit-yee (袁潔儀)		
Belinda Hamnett		
Andrew Yuen (袁文傑)		
Chu Yin-jan (朱燕珍)		
Lui Yau-wai (呂有慧)		
Ricky Chan (陳寶轅)		
Wong Wan-choi (黃允材)		
Susan Tse		
Jim Ping-hei (詹秉熙)		
Maggie Leung (梁碧芝)		
Leung san (梁珊)		
Kong To (江圖)		
Szema Wah Lung (司馬華龍)		

== See also ==
- Song Bird
