= Legend of Zu Mountain =

- Genre: Fantasy; Action; Romance; Xianxia
- Based on: Legend of the Swordsmen of the Mountains of Shu by Huanzhulouzhu
- Written by: Huanzhulouzhu; Li Xian Gi
- Directed by: Huang Wei Jie
- Starring: William Chan; Zhao Liying; Nicky Wu
- Country of origin: China
- Original language: Mandarin
- No. of seasons: 1
- No. of episodes: 56

Production
- Production locations: Guangxi, China
- Running time: 45 min

Original release
- Network: iQiyi, Anhui Television
- Release: 22 September 2015 – 31 January 2016

Legend of Zu Mountain (Chinese: 蜀山战纪之剑侠传奇) is a 2015 Chinese television series starring William Chan, Zhao Liying and Nicky Wu. It is adapted from the novel Legend of the Swordsmen of the Mountains of Shu written by Huanzhulouzhu. The series premiered on iQiyi on 22 September 2015.

== Synopsis ==
Mt Shu is the pugilistic world's number 1 sect for many years. In order to protect the world from harm, the Sect Leader Zhuge Yuwo placed the enchanted gem into Ding Yin's body to prevent the green-clothed reverent, Shangguan Jingwo from stealing it over. Ding Yin then later went under Mt Shu to practice his sword skills, aiming to be Mt Shu's best disciple and seek revenge on Lu Pao. He meets Lu Pao's daughter, Yu Wuxin, by chance and realizes that she looks exactly like his deceased wife. The two fell in love. At the same time, the inner conflicts within Mt Shu starts to unravel itself, and a disaster is about to fall upon the pugilistic world. Ding Yin, together with his sect mates Dan Chenzi, Zhuge Ziying, Zhou Qingyun and his sworn brother Xiaozhang, set on a journey to prevent the disasters from happening. However, they instead fall into a more sinister plot, leading to everyone's relationships to fall apart.

== Cast ==
=== Main ===
- William Chan as Ding Da Li (丁大力) / Ding Yin (丁隐)

Xiao Ru's first male disciple. Yu Wuxin’s husband.

- Nicky Wu as Lu Pao (绿袍尊者) / Shangguan Jingwo (上官警我)

Chief of the Fiery Shadow Holy Clan, Yu Wuxin and Tu Meng's father, Su Yin's husband and Tu Mei's love interest.

- Zhao Liying as Yu Wuxin (玉无心)

Daughter of Shangguan Jingwo and Su Yin, Ding Yin's wife and Tu Meng's half-sister.

- Janice Man as Xiao Xi (小溪) / Zhou Qingyun (周青云) Ziying's junior sister, Xiao Ru's disciple.
- Vengo Gao as Dan Chengzi (丹辰子) Reverend Zhuge Yuwo's senior disciple and Ziying's lover.
- Ye Zuxin as Zhang Xianbing (张馅饼)
- Liu Sitong as Zhuge Ziying (诸葛紫英) Reverend Zhuge Yuwo's daughter, Qingyun's senior sister and Xiao Ru's senior disciple.
- Jia Xiaochen as Tu Mei (屠媚) Tu Ba's sister and Tu Meng's mother.

Vice Chief of the Fiery Shadow Holy Clan.

- Louis Fan as Gongsun Wuwo (公孙无我) / Person in the Mountain (山中人)
- Zhang Tianlin as Tu Ba (屠霸) Tu Mei's brother, Tu Meng's biological uncle and adoptive father.
- Han Yuqin as Su Yin (素因) / Empty Handed Immortal Healer (素手医仙)

Shangguan Jingwo's wife, Yu Wuxin's mother and Tu Meng's teacher. Xiao Ru's junior sister.

- Wei Chun Guang as Miao Yi (秒一)
- Li Jinrong as Zhuge Yuwo (诸葛驭我) Ziying's father, Dan Chengzi's teacher.
- Wu Huaxin as Nine Poison Deity Lord (九毒神君) Member of the Fiery Shadow Holy Clan and Lu Pao's Right Hand Protector.
- Cui Zhong as Bai Cao (百草仙人)
- Wu Xiaoli as Xiao Ru (晓如真人) Head of Qi Xia Peak, Ziying, Qingyun and Ding Yin's teacher. Su Yin's senior sister.
- Wang Xichao as Five Ghost Heavenly King (五鬼天王) An old friend of Tu Mei from Western Region, Lu Pao's Left Hand Protector.

=== Supporting ===
- Yu Yue as Tu Meng (屠梦) Shangguan Jingwo and Tu Mei's daughter, Yu Wuxin's half-sister, Tu Ba's biological niece and adoptive daughter.
- Sun Dongan as Zhang Qi (张琪) Miao Yi's disciple.
- Zhang Yeshi as Reverend Tong Yuang Qi (佟元齐真人) Senior disciple of Wu Dang sect from 24 years. Later, become a sect leader of Wu Dang sect.
- He Zhonghua as Sect Leader Zuo Jing (左景掌门)
- Zong Fengyan as Reverend Tai Qing (太清真人)
- Wang Yifei as the soul of Qing Su sword (青素剑灵)
- Liu Xushi as Ah Qing (何清) Gongsun Wuwo's disciple.
- Xing Luodan as Su Yang (苏阳) Gongsun Wuwo's disciple. He died by Tu Mei's poison of being accused a traitor on Mt. Zu.
- Lan Tian as Wu Xiacao (吴夏草) Bai Cao's disciple.
- Zhu Fengshi as Lin Tianyi (林天逸) Hui'er's husband. Second-command leader of the bandits.
- Li Ruoci as Hui'er (卉儿) Lin Tianyi's wife.
- Wang Bin as Ma Yuan Long (马元龙) Leader of the bandits.
- Yang Shizhen as Xiao Wu (小五)
- Huang Shichao as Zhu Zi (柱子)
- Li Liuli as Madam Fan/Fan Xiao Xue (范夫人/范小雪) Zhou Qingyun's birth mother, Zhou Ao Ran's wife and owner of Tao Ran residence.
- Zhang Jiachuan as Zhou Ao Ran (周傲然) Zhou Qingyun's birth father and Fan Xiao Xue's late husband.
- Zhu Rongrong as Yun Chong Xue (云中雪)
- Guo Ruixi as Yu Ming Niang (余明娘) Xiao Dian's mother, Qing Chong Mountain's master.
- Yuan Bingyan as Xiao Dian (小蝶) Yu Ming Niang's daughter.

== Soundtrack ==
1st Season

No.	Title	Singer	Length
1.	"Between Love and Hate 《愛恨之間》" (Opening theme song)	Nicky Wu
2.	"Destruction in Chaos 《亂世俱滅》" (Ending theme song)	Zhao Liying & Andy Hui

2nd season

No.	Title	Singer	Length
1.	"I Choose to Like You 《我選擇喜歡你》" (Opening theme song)	Bibi Zhou
2.	"Heart's Constructor " (Ending theme song)	Nicola Tsang

3rd season

No.	Title	Singer	Length
1.	"Snow in the Desert 《沙漠飛雪》" (Opening theme song)	Nicky Wu
2.	"I am Me 《我就是我》" (Ending theme song)	Ye Zuxin, Huang Shichao, Zhang Sifan, Yang Shihan

4th season

No.	Title	Singer	Length
1.	"Enemy 《宿敵》" (Opening theme song)	Nicky Wu & Xu Zhian
2.	"I Have Never Existed 《我從來不存在》" (Ending theme song)	Zhao Liying & Julia Yue

5th season

No.	Title	Singer	Length
1.	"The Rain Wouldn't Stop 《雨還下不停》" (Opening theme song)	GJ (Zhang Zhuojia)
2.	"Piece of my Heart《悠悠我心》" (Ending theme song)	J.Arie

== Ratings ==
- Highest ratings are marked in red, lowest ratings are marked in blue

Anhui TV Premiere Ratings
Original air date	Episode	CSM52 City Rating	Audience share	Rank	CSM35 City Rating	Audience share	Rank
2016.01.16	1-2	0.903	2.318	6	0.977	2.452	5
2016.01.17	3-4	1.003	2.539	6	1.088	2.684	5
2016.01.18	5-6	0.970	2.497	7	1.050	2.640	7
2016.01.19	7-8	0.958	2.452	6	1.032	2.572	6
2016.01.20	9-10	0.852	2.15	7	0.919	2.269	7
2016.01.21	11-12	0.934	2.351	6	0.989	2.440	6
2016.01.22	13-14	0.999	2.47	6	1.074	2.615	6
2016.01.23	15-16	0.965	2.37	7	1.038	2.497	7
2016.01.24	17-18	1.065	2.60	7	1.154	2.757	7
2016.01.25	19-20	1.073	2.756	6	1.151	2.896	6
2016.01.26	21-22	1.066	2.699	6	1.148	2.873	6
2016.01.27	23-24	1.058	2.680	6	1.153	2.859	6
2016.01.28	25-26	1.102	2.812	6	1.185	2.968	6
2016.01.29	27-28	1.072	2.751	6	1.157	2.917	5
2016.01.30	29-30	1.067	2.790	6	1.149	2.936	5
2016.01.31	31-32	1.109	2.825	5	1.20	2.991	5
2016.02.01	33-34	1.132	2.927	4	1.219	3.079	4
2016.02.02	35-36	1.152	3.056	3	1.254	3.249	2
2016.02.03	37-38	1.052	2.767	5	1.132	2.918	5
2016.02.04	39-40	1.059	2.834	3	1.156	3.038	3
2016.02.06	41-42	0.882	2.333	3	0.968	2.505	2
2016.02.08	43-44	0.807	2.295	2	0.863	2.421	2
2016.02.09	45-46	0.797	2.483	3	0.841	2.571	3
2016.02.10	47-48	0.797	2.445	3	0.861	2.596	2
2016.02.11	49-50	0.796	2.385	3	0.862	2.537	3
2016.02.12	51-52	0.845	2.401	2	0.927	2.584	2
2016.02.13	53-54	0.89	2.348	4	0.947	2.474	3
2016.02.14	55-56	0.921	2.393	3	0.991	2.52	3
Average ratings		0.976	/	/	1.053	/	/

== International broadcast ==
- Thailand - ONE
- Indonesia - RTV
- Malaysia - Astro
- Singapore - VV Drama, Jia Le Channel
- Philippines - GMA Network
- India - Sony TV (Hindi), Star Vijay (Tamil), Asianet (Malayalam), Star Maa (Telugu)
