= The Legend of Zu =

2001 Hong Kong film by Tsui Hark

- Film poster
- 蜀山傳
- Directed by: Tsui Hark
- Written by: Lee Man-choi; Tsui Hark
- Based on: Legend of the Swordsmen of the Mountains of Shu by Huanzhulouzhu
- Produced by: Tsui Hark; Brian Cox; Anant Singh
- Starring: Ekin Cheng; Cecilia Cheung; Louis Koo; Patrick Tam; Kelly Lin; Wu Jing; Sammo Hung; Zhang Ziyi
- Cinematography: Herman Yau; Poon Hang-sang; William Yim
- Edited by: Marco Mak
- Music by: Ricky Ho
- Production companies: Film Workshop; One Hundred Years of Film
- Distributed by: China Star Entertainment Group
- Release date: 9 August 2001
- Running time: 104 minutes
- Country: Hong Kong
- Language: Cantonese
- Budget: HK$90 Million
- Box office: HK$11,757,088

The Legend of Zu (蜀山傳), also known as Zu Warriors, is a 2001 Hong Kong wuxia fantasy film adapted from the novel Legend of the Swordsmen of the Mountains of Shu by Huanzhulouzhu. Directed and produced by Tsui Hark, the film starred Ekin Cheng, Cecilia Cheung, Louis Koo, Patrick Tam, Kelly Lin, and Wu Jing, with special appearances by Sammo Hung and Zhang Ziyi.

== Synopsis ==
Peacekeeping immortals inhabit a mythical mountain range called Zu, located between Heaven and Earth. The demon Insomnia desires to rule Zu and the world below so it wipes out the immortal clans one by one. Dawn of the Kunlun Clan sends away her apprentice, King Sky, as she believes that their emotional attachment to each other hinders their progress. Shortly after King Sky leaves, Insomnia attacks Dawn and disintegrates her.

200 years later, White Brows, grandmaster of the Omei Clan, senses Insomnia's approach and sends his apprentice Red to investigate. King Sky joins forces with the Omei to fight Insomnia, who retreats into the Blood Cave after its defeat. Red and King Sky risk their lives to fight Insomnia inside the cave and narrowly survive after White Brows saves them. While Insomnia absorbs the cave's energy, White Brows orders Red to guard the entrance while the Omei prepare for another battle.

White Brows attempts to combine Omei's two guardian swords, wielded by Enigma and Hollow, to form a new weapon, but the fusion process fails and rebounds, killing Hollow and injuring Enigma. Before leaving for a new dimension to find another weapon to defeat the demon, White Brows resurrects Hollow, who is reborn as Ying, and puts King Sky in charge of the Omei. King Sky learns that Enigma is Dawn's reincarnation. When Ying turns out to be incapable of wielding his sword, King Sky tries to take his place and ends up killing himself.

Meanwhile, Red is possessed by Amnesia, a flower demon, and returns to destroy the Omei and capture Enigma. At the most critical hour, Ying suddenly recalls his past life and regains his powers. Concurrently, King Sky returns to life and receives the new weapon found by White Brows. They join the Omei survivors in confronting the possessed Red outside the Blood Cave. Ying saves Enigma while King Sky attempts to exorcise Red but fails and Red sacrifices himself to destroy Amnesia.

At Omei, Enigma and Ying fuse their weapons successfully and combine forces with King Sky to battle and weaken Insomnia. Enigma allows Insomnia to possess her in order to prevent the demon from escaping, giving King Sky the chance to destroy the demon. After the battle, Enigma is reincarnated as a new immortal and Omei is restored, while King Sky leaves to rebuild Kunlun.

== Cast ==
- Ekin Cheng as King Sky
- Cecilia Cheung as Dawn / Enigma
- Louis Koo as Red
- Patrick Tam as Thunder
- Kelly Lin as Amnesia
- Wu Jing as Hollow / Ying
- Sammo Hung as White Brows
- Zhang Ziyi as Joy
- Ng Kong as Hollow
- Lau Shun as Transcendental

== Distribution ==
Although Miramax Films bought the rights to distribute it in the United States, the film was never released in theatres, despite advertising the American release with movie trailers (which appeared as previews on Apple's website under movie trailers). It was eventually released on DVD on 19 August 2005 under the title Zu Warriors.

The film was pulled from exhibition at the Hong Kong International Film Festival because of scenes that were shot in the People's Republic of China without prior authorization.

== Box office ==
The film grossed HK$10 million in its theatrical release in Hong Kong.

== Critical reception ==
The Legend of Zu received mixed reviews from critics. Those who praised the film mostly noted its thrilling action scenes and elaborate, computer-generated sets.

The American release of the film was cut down extensively from 104 minutes to 80 minutes, with many plot and character development scenes being removed and most of the action scenes intact. This resulted in viewers finding the American version much harder to follow because of shallow characters and a plot so stripped of substance.

In retrospect, Tsui Hark said: “For me, it's a disaster. I think the bigger problem was in the post-production. We were caught in a dilemma during the production and we had to look for a way out. We relied too much on the post-production house. As it turned out, those special-effects shots were not acceptable, but we had to live with it.“
