= The Swordswoman of Huangjiang =

1930 film

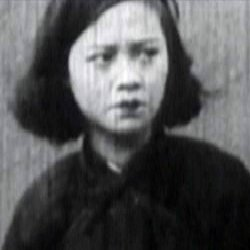
The Swordswoman of Huangjiang

The Swordswoman of Huangjiang (Chinese: 荒江女侠; also known as Huangjiang Nüxia) was a 13-film wuxia series. The only film of the series which still exists today was its first installment, Uproar At the Baolin Temple, which is the lone surviving film of Chen's silent-era oeuvre as well as one of only two surviving Chinese films of its kind from that period . The entire series was filmed over two years and includes elements of drama, comedy, and action . It featured archetypical motifs that would become common in the wuxia films which began to appear and gain popularity more than three decades later.

== Uproar at the Baolin Temple ==
The Swordswoman of Huangjiang: Uproar at the Baolin Temple
- Directed by: Chen Kengran; Zheng Yi-sheng; Shang Guan(-)wu
- Starring: Chen Zhi-gong; Xu Qinfang
- Cinematography: Yao Shiquan
- Production company: Youlian
- Release date: 1930
- Running time: 72 minutes (excluding lost footage)
- Language: Silent with Chinese intertitles

Uproar at the Baolin Temple (1930) was the first film of the 13-part serial The Swordswoman of Huangjiang.

=== Plot summary ===
The character Fang Yuqing, accompanied by her "martial brother" Yue Jianqui travels the Jiang Hu providing what assistance they can offer to those in need. Early in the film two men are attacked by a giant golden bird (played by a man in a costume) but escape when the bird is attacked by another large but darker bird (created with special effects). However, the latter bird carries a child away. The men escape to their village, and subsequently, the two main characters arrive. They offer their help, but after defeating the bird and saving the child, Fang's donkey is stolen by another swordswoman. She pursues her and they engage in a fight scene. The thief afterward reveals that her village of origin is under siege by outlaws. She has heard of Fang's reputation and has baited her in order to test her skills before requesting her help in saving her hometown. (That event takes place in one of the later films which no longer exists.) The two make peace and the party continues onwards, eventually stopping to rest for the night at the titular temple. However, what initially appeared to be Buddhist monks are actually disguised villains in the service of one of Fang's enemies, who attempt to ambush the heroes while they sleep by sneaking in via a hidden corridor. This is when the film's climactic fight scene takes place, in which Fang battles the temple's "monks" using double swords. The film ends abruptly at this point due to lost footage.

== See also ==
- Cinema of China
- Hong Kong action cinema
