= Adia Chan =

Hong Kong actress and singer (born 1971)

- 陳松伶
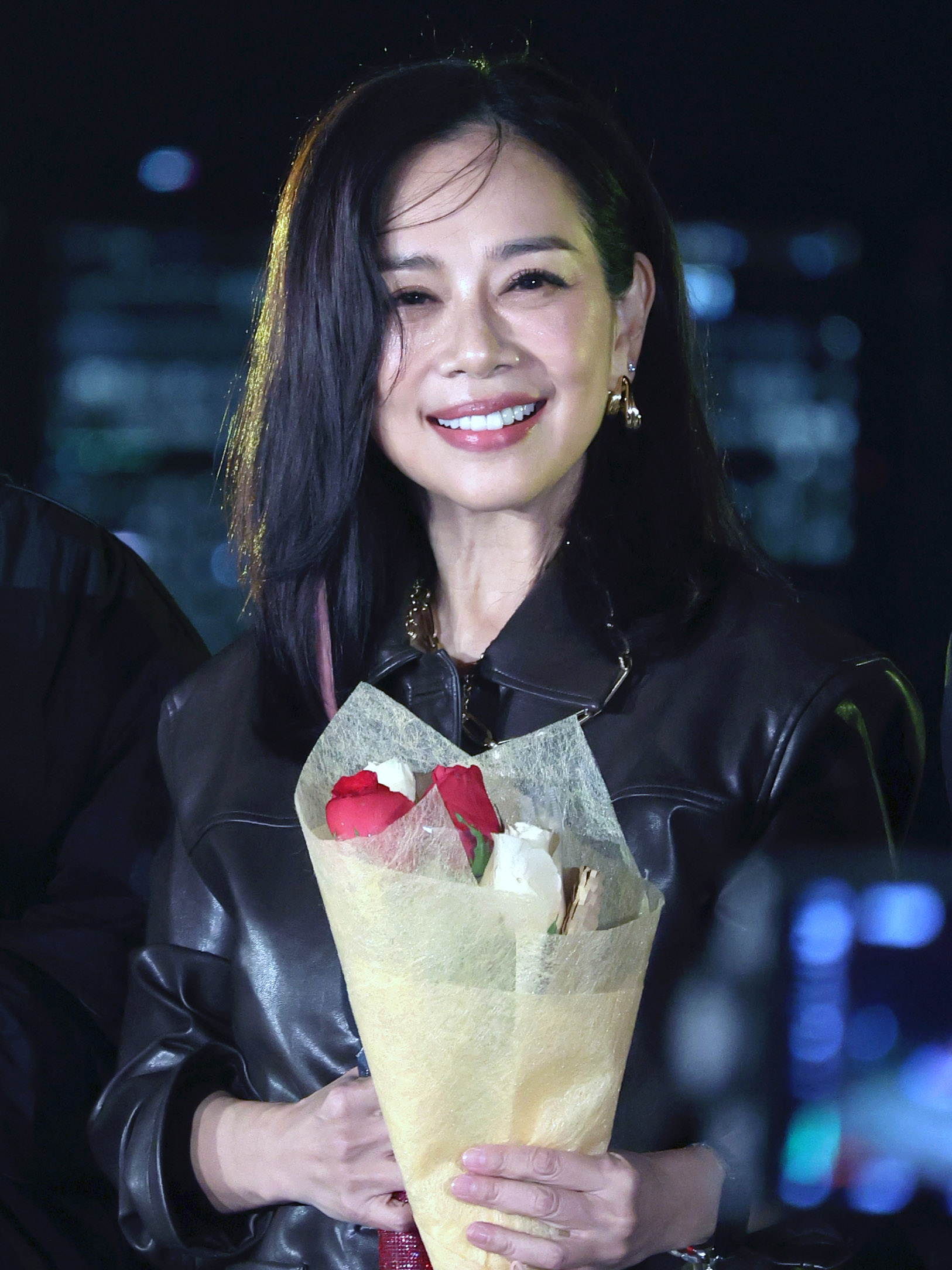
- Chan in 2026
- Born: 21 January 1970 (age 56); British Hong Kong
- Education: The Chinese University of Hong Kong (BA)
- Occupations: Singer, actress, television presenter
- Years active: 1987–present
- Spouse: Zhang Duo (m. 2011)

Chinese name
- Traditional Chinese: 陳松伶
- Simplified Chinese: 陈松伶
Transcriptions
Standard Mandarin
- Hanyu Pinyin: Chén Sōnglíng
Yue: Cantonese
- Jyutping: Can4 Cung4 Ling4
- Musical career
- Also known as: Chung Chung (松松), Nadia, Nnadia
- Origin: Hong Kong
- Genres: Cantopop, Mandopop
- Instruments: Voice, piano
- Website: instgram.com/adia_chan

Adia Chan (born 21 January 1971) is a Hong Kong actress, singer and model.

== Life and career ==
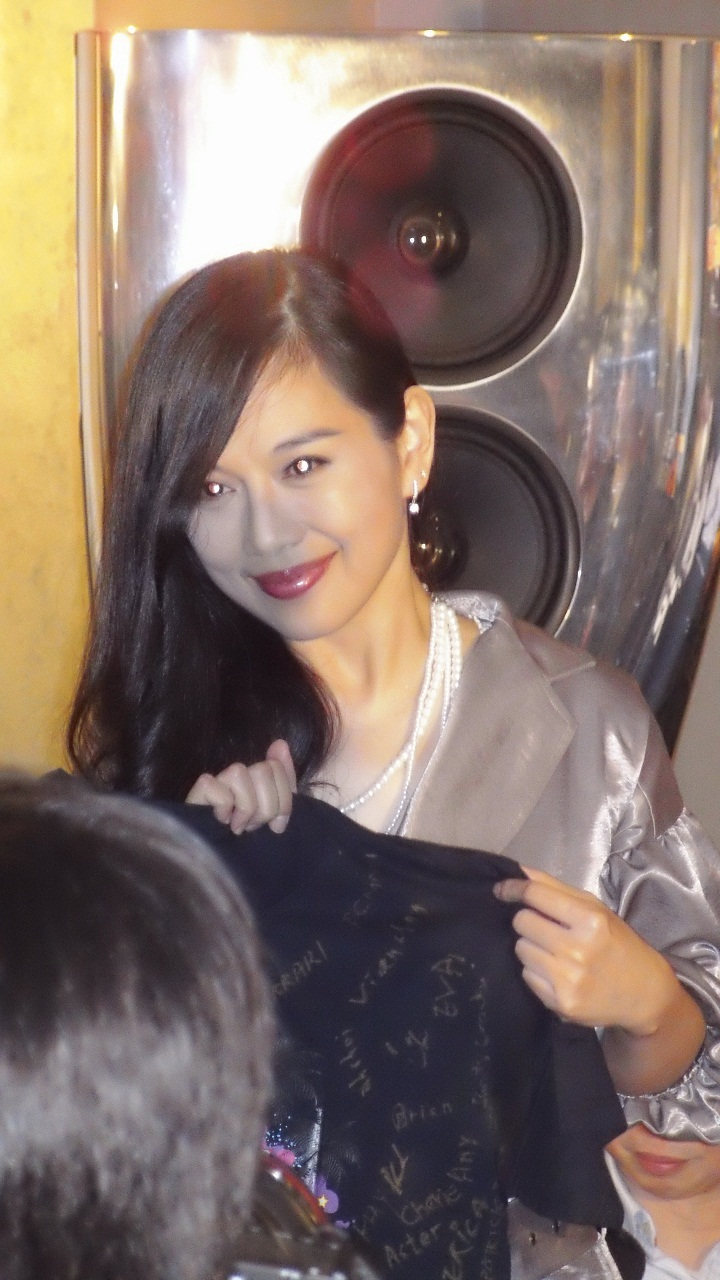
Chan in 2012

Chan was born to Chinese Ethnic Indonesian parents. Chan's parents are Indonesian Chinese and her family moved to Hong Kong when she was three years old. She started show business in 1985 at the age of 14, winning a Sally Yeh impersonation contest hosted by TVB, within the show Enjoy Yourself Tonight (歡樂今宵). Thereafter she hosted many children's show and sang many children's songs which gained her much popularity within the younger generation. Chan stars in films as well as Hong Kong/Malaysian/Singaporean/mainland-Chinese television serials although she is most well known for many of her roles in the TVB series, especially Song Bird. She has also performed alongside Jacky Cheung in the musical Snow.Wolf.Lake, the Mandarin and Cantonese version.

In 1995, Chan changed her name from 陳松龄 to 陳松伶. The pronunciation was still the same – Ling – but a different character was used. The 'Ling' in her original name means "age" and the 'Ling' in her new name is part of a phrase that means "intelligent and witty". As her short hair grew longer, Chan went through yet another metamorphosis in 1999. She officially changed her English name from Nadia to Nnadia. The added "n" was a self reminder to "never give up." It also symbolised "new". In 2012, she again changed her English stage name to Adia, removing the 2 initial "n's". A reason for the change has not been given publicly.

Chan is now settled in Beijing after marriage to Chinese actor Zhang Duo.

== Filmography ==
- Porky's meatball 鬼馬校園 (1986)
- The Last Conflict (1988)
- Shanghai Heroic Story 英雄地之小刀會 (1992)
- Banana Club 正牌香蕉俱樂部 (1996) (cameo)
- Troublesome Night 6 陰陽路六之凶周刊 (1999) (cameo)
- Troublesome Night 7 陰陽路七之撞到正 (2000)
- Troublesome Night 8 陰陽路八之棺材仔 (2000)
- The Enemy 敵對 (2001)
- Life Is a Miracle 生命因愛動聽 (2001)
- Return from the other World 賭神之神 (2002)
- The Hidden Enforcers 殺手狂龍 (2002)
- Money Suckers 一屋貪錢人 (2002)
- Modern Cinderella 現代灰姑娘 (2002)
- Dizzy Date 心跳 (2002)
- Man in Blues 男人之苦 (2004) (cameo)

== Television ==
- Song Bird 天涯歌女 (1989|25 December 1989) (TVB, Hong Kong)
- Beside the Seaside, Beside the Sea 月兒彎彎照九州 (1990|23 December 1991) (TVB, Hong Kong)
- Be My Guest 我愛玫瑰園 (1991|2 April 1991) (Guest Stars) (TVB, Hong Kong)
- Brother Cry for Me 忠奸老實人 (1991|27 May 1991) (TVB, Hong Kong)
- The Zu Mountain Saga 蜀山奇俠之仙侶奇緣 (1991|22 July 1991) (TVB, Hong Kong)
- Mark of Triumph 92鍾無艷 (1992|9 March 1992) (TVB, Hong Kong)
- The Spirit of Love 精靈酒店 (1993|30 November 1993) (TVB, Hong Kong)
- The Fate of the Last Empire 清宮氣數錄 (1993|11 April 1994) (TVB, Hong Kong)
- Knot to Treasure 婚姻物語 (1994|4 July 1994) (TVB, Hong Kong)
- Instinct 笑看風雲 (1994|21 November 1994) (TVB, Hong Kong)
- The New Justice Pao 新包青天之劫聖旨 (1995|N/A) (TVB, Hong Kong)
- To Love with Love 水餃皇后 (1995|5 June 1995) (TVB, Hong Kong)
- Cold Blood Warm Heart 天地男兒 (1996|5 February 1996) (TVB, Hong Kong)
- Once Upon a Time in Shanghai 新上海灘 (1996|2 September 1996) (TVB, Hong Kong)
- The Zu Mountain Saga (1996) (Home TV, India)
- A Place of One's Own 大澳的天空 (1997|9 February 1998) (TVB, Hong Kong)
- Love in a Chaotic World 星星 月亮 太陽 (1998|N/A) (Mainland China)
- Happy Ever After 金玉滿堂 (1999|15 March 1999) (TVB, Hong Kong)
- Coup De Scorpion 天蠍行動 (1999|N/A) (MediaCorp, Singapore)
- Legendary Four Aces 金裝四大才子 (2000|7 August 2000) (TVB, Hong Kong)
- In the Realm of Success 公私戀事多 (2001|17 September 2001) (TVB, Hong Kong)
- Doomed to Oblivion 鄭板橋 (2001|N/A) (TVB, Hong Kong)
- Life's Angels 生命天使 (2002|N/A)
- You Are the One 1/2緣份 (2004|N/A) (MediaCorp, Singapore)
- Strike at Heart 驚艷一槍 (2005|N/A) (TVB, Hong Kong)
- Trimming Success 飛短留長父子兵 (2005|15 May 2006) (TVB, Hong Kong)
- Blood Isn't Cold 血未冷 (2007|September-2007) (Mainland China)
- Relatives by Marriage 亲家 (2007|February-2008) (Mainland China)
- Legend of Yujing 太安堂之玉井传奇 (2008|) (Mainland China)
- Three Folk-Tales 京东三枝花 (2008|) (Mainland China, guest star)
- Single Mother (2008|) (Mainland China)
- ICAC Investigators 2011 (2011) (RTHK, Hong Kong)
- The No No Girl 全職沒女 (2017|April) (TVB, Hong Kong)
- The Ghetto-Fabulous Lady (2019)
- Sisters Who Make Waves 乘风破浪的姐姐 (2020)

== Discography ==
- Porky's Meatballs 鬼馬校園 (Crown 1985)
- Curfew 宵禁 (Crown 1987)
- 89 Chan Chung Ling 89陳松齡 (Crown 1989)
- Songbird 天涯歌女 (Crown 1990)
- 走路新郎哥 兒歌兒歌 (Crown 1990)
- Beside the Seaside, Beside the Sea 月兒彎彎照九州 (Crown 1991)
- Zu Mountain Saga II/Brother Cry for Me 仙侣奇緣 忠奸老實人 (Crown 1991)
- Dream Comes True/Confused Love 夢境成真 迷惘的愛 (Crown 1992)
- I Fell in Love with a Hero 我愛上了英雄 (Crown 1993)
- What's Falling Is Not Rain 天邊洒的不是雨 (Crown 1994)
- Remembrance 松松牽掛 (Crown 1994)
- Love for a thousand years 愛到一千年 (CIE 1995)
- Girl of My Age 同齡女子 (Rock 1998)
- Love Is Not Simple 愛你不是渾閑事 (Rock 1999)
- Chan Chung Ling's Greatest Hits 滾石香港黄金十年—陳松伶 (Rock 2003)
- Restart 松新開始 (Universal 2004)

== Musicals ==
- Snow Wolf Lake 雪狼湖 (original Cantonese version 1997) – 寧靜雪
- Snow Wolf Lake 雪狼湖 (Mandarin version 2005) – 寧玉鳳

== Publications ==
- (Charity Photo Album 慈善影集) Memoir in South Africa 非起點 (1999)
- (Charity Photo Album 慈善影集) Memoir in New York 扭壹紐(2001)
- Nnadia Magic Tips 松書01 – 松松姐姐美容魔法 (1 January 2004)
- Interviews with 12 Fermale Celebrities 松書02 – 伶感十二 (1 August 2004)

== Miscellaneous TV appearances ==
- 刑警本色 (TV movie 1989, TVB)
- Passion Among Us (TV movie 1994, TVB)
- 謎情殺機 (TV movie 1994, TVB)
- 西鐵情緣 (TV movie 1999, KCR)
- Death Trap 咫尺疑魂 (TV movie 2000, TVB)
- Coping With Work Stress 工作減壓有良方 (2001, Occupational Safety Council)
- Jade Solid Gold (JSG) 勁歌金曲 (2002, TVB)
- Women With Dreams 2006 女人多自在3之強人媽咪 (2006, RTHK)
