= Street Angel (1937 film) =

1937 Chinese drama film

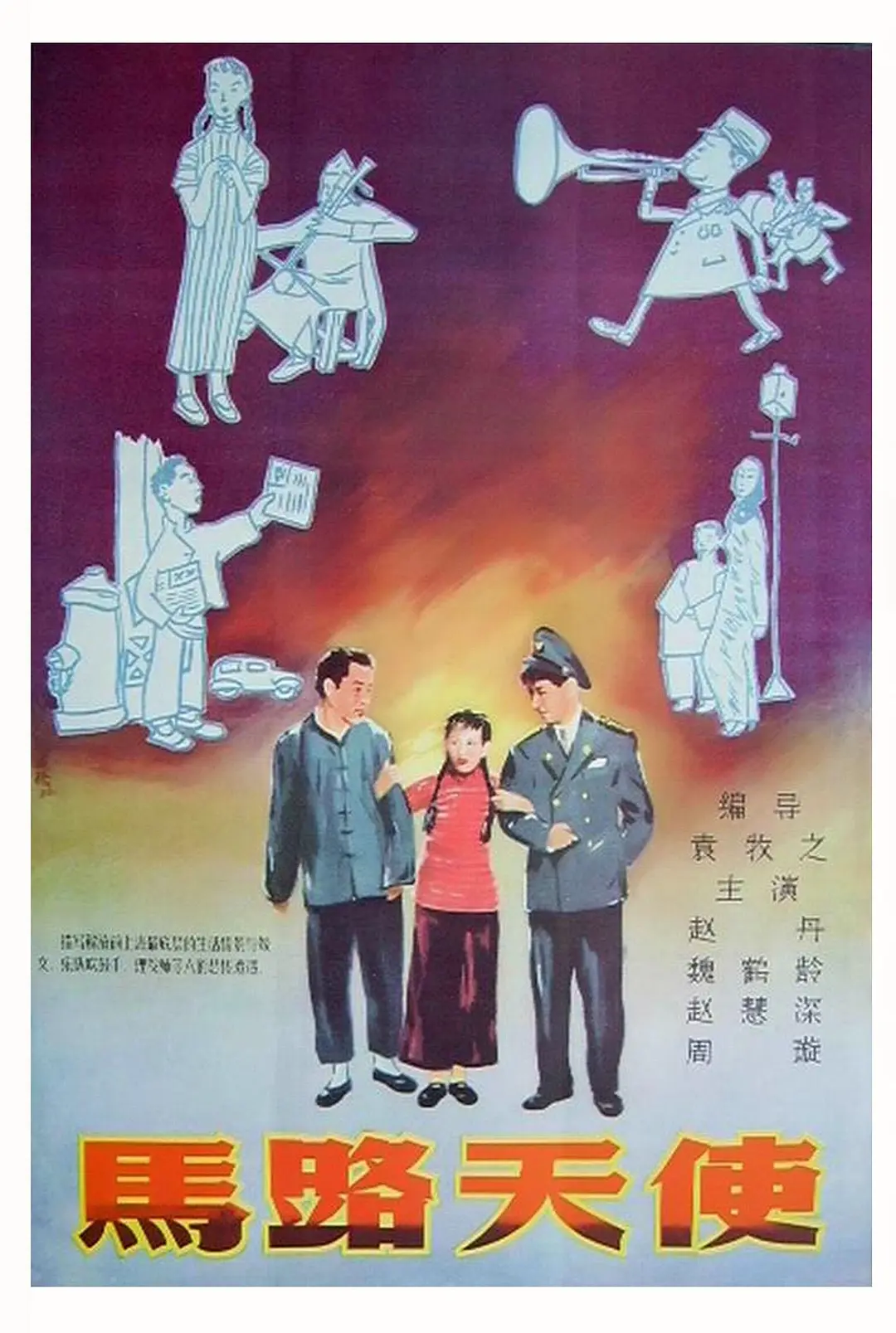
- Film poster
- Traditional Chinese: 馬路天使
- Simplified Chinese: 马路天使
- Literal meaning: street angel
- Hanyu Pinyin: mǎlù tiānshǐ
- Wade–Giles: ma3-lu4 t'ien1-shih3
- Directed by: Yuan Muzhi
- Written by: Yuan Muzhi
- Starring: Zhou Xuan; Zhao Huishen; Zhao Dan
- Cinematography: Wu Yinxian
- Edited by: Chin Siu-Cheung
- Music by: He Luting
- Production company: Mingxing Film Company
- Distributed by: United States: Cinema Epoch (DVD); also available on YouTube
- Release date: 24 July 1937
- Running time: 91 minutes
- Country: China
- Language: Mandarin

Street Angel (Chinese: 馬路天使; pinyin: Mǎlù tiānshǐ), also known as Street Angels, is a 1937 left-wing Chinese film directed by Yuan Muzhi (袁牧之) and released by Mingxing Film Company. Starring popular Chinese actor Zhao Dan (赵丹) and iconic Chinese singer Zhou Xuan (周璇), the story is set in the slums of Shanghai, chronicling the lives of a band of downtrodden underclass outcasts: a tea house singer, a trumpet player, a newspaper hawker, and a prostitute. By blending elements of romance, comedy and melodrama into the storyline, the characters find themselves in a variety of difficult situations as they try to navigate the hardships of the city during the 1930s. Released towards the end of the golden age of Shanghai cinema, the film is regarded as a masterpiece of the Chinese left-wing movement. Taking place during a time of national tension within the country, issues such as economic policy and military conflict are explored to raise awareness about some of China's most pressing concerns. Additionally, the depiction of an impoverished neighborhood in the midst of a contemporary city is a compelling examination of how modernization had affected China during this era. This fusion between the two also provides a commentary on the combined effects that modernization and colonialism had on Shanghai specifically.

As one of China's earliest sound films, Street Angel also made a name for itself by popularizing two timeless ballads: “Song of the Seasons” (四季歌) and “The Wandering Songstress” (天涯歌女), both of which are still celebrated as classics of Chinese modern song evolution.

== Plot ==
Set in the slums of 1935 Shanghai, the film begins with a wedding procession. Chen Shaoping, also known as Xiao Chen (Zhao Dan), is a trumpet player in the marching band who establishes a romantic connection with his neighbour, a songstress named Xiao Hong (Zhou Xuan) who fled the Japanese invasion of Manchuria with her older sister Xiao Yun (Zhao Huishen). In the midst of poverty, the two sisters are taken in by a couple that own a tea house and are subsequently made to work for them. As a way of pleasing customers, Xiao Yun is forced to become a streetwalker while Xiao Hong works as a singer.

The film continues to slowly develop the flirtatious relationship between Xiao Hong and her neighbour Chen Shaoping. Communicating across the street through their windows, the couple enjoy each other's company through impromptu activities such as Xiao Hong singing a song alongside Chen Shaoping's accompaniment and Chen Shaoping putting on a magic show for Xiao Hong's entertainment. Then, one day, Chen Shaoping's friend the Barber (Qian Qianli) sees Mr. Gu (Feng Zhicheng), a thug and frequenter of the tea house where Xiao Hong works, take Xiao Hong out after getting a haircut from the barbershop where the Barber works. The Barber then tells Ah Bing (Shen Jun), the young peddler who is also friends with Chen Shaoping, to follow Mr. Gu and Xiao Hong, and Ah Bing watches them happily buy clothes and eat together. When Ah Bing and the Barber tell Chen Shaoping of the events that have occurred, Chen Shaoping misinterprets this as Xiao Hong being unfaithful, and runs back to his room upset.

Chen Shaoping confronts Xiao Hong and they get into a fight about her apparent affair, whereby Xiao Hong flees back home. When Xiao Yun returns, she sees a sobbing Xiao Hong and comforts her. Later, Chen Shaoping and Wang (Wei Heiling), Chen Shaoping's friend and a newspaper seller, are drinking at the tea house and an intoxicated Chen Shaoping demands Xiao Hong to sing him a song. She reluctantly sings him the song, "The Wandering Songstress," but he leaves angrily before she is able to finish. Soon after, Xiao Hong overhears that her “parents” are scheming to sell her off to Mr. Gu. Unsure of what to do, Xiao Hong beseeches her sister for advice, who convinces her to seek help from Chen Shaoping.

Although initially still upset, Chen Shaoping comes to realize that Xiao Hong only has eyes for him, and after mending their relationship, he agrees to let her seek refuge with him and Wang. After hearing of the impending transaction involving Xiao Hong, Chen Shaoping and Wang go to consult Lawyer Zhang (Sun Jing) to see if they can do anything to stop it. However, they realize that they cannot afford the costly legal fees.

Without this legal help, the group flees to another district of Shanghai to hide from Xiao Hong's “parents” and Mr. Gu. Xiao Yun also escapes the teahouse to reunite with the others, and plans to start a new life with Wang, as they are in love. Xiao Hong and Chen Shaoping have a common law marriage in their apartment, but they also face eviction as they cannot pay rent. The barbershop, three months behind on rent, is also forced to close down despite the workers holding a special promotion in an attempt to save the business.

Eventually, the owner of the tea house and Mr. Gu track down where Xiao Hong, Xiao Yun, Wang, and Chen Shaoping are living, although only Xiao Hong and Xiao Yun are present at the time. Xiao Hong manages to escape, but Xiao Yun stays behind and refuses to reveal her sister's whereabouts to her adoptive father. He heartlessly calls her a slut and throws her against the wall. Fed up with everything she has suffered at the hands of the tea house owner, Xiao Yun retaliates by throwing a knife at him. The knife misses and he picks it up and throws it back at her, striking her in the chest and dealing a fatal blow. Upon hearing the news of the attack, Wang rushes to recover Xiao Yun. While Wang is out searching for a doctor, Xiao Yun dies surrounded by her sister, Chen Shaoping, and his friends. Wang returns, stating that he did not have enough money for a doctor. The film ends with the small group mourning the loss of Xiao Yun together.

== Cast ==
- In Order of Appearance:
  - Zhao Dan as Chen Shaoping, also known as Xiao Chen, a trumpet player and Xiao Hong's love interest
  - Wei Heling as Wang, a newspaper seller and Chen's best friend
  - Zhou Xuan as Xiao Hong, a teahouse songstress
  - Zhao Huishen as Xiao Yun, a prostitute and Xiao Hong's older sister
  - Wang Jiting as the fiddle player, the owner of the teahouse who takes in Xiao Hong and Xiao Yun
  - Liu Jinyu as the wife of the teahouse owner
  - Feng Zhicheng as Gu, a wealthy thug
  - Chen Yiting as Parasite, a henchman
  - Qian Qianli as the barber, a friend of Xiao Chen
  - Tang Chaofu as the barber shop owner
  - Shen Jun as Ah Bing, a young peddler and friend of Xiao Chen
  - Qiu Yuanyuan as the unemployed man, a mute and friend of Xiao Chen
  - Yuan Shaomei as the young widow
  - Sun Jing as Zhang, a lawyer
  - Xie Jun as Young Man Fallen on Hard Times
  - Liu Liying as Young Woman Fallen on Hard Times
  - Han Yun as the policeman
  - Li Dizhi as the rent collector
  - Yao Ping as the playboy
  - Yuan Afa as the driver

Xie Tian is uncreditied.

== Production ==
Produced by Mingxing Company, the film was framed and photographed in Shanghai. Director Yuan Muzhi used much of the city of Shanghai itself, such as Shanghai's grand colonial buildings, as well as the neon street lights of the 1930s. These visual features serve to contrast the succeeding display of areas of Shanghai marked by narrow streets and neighbourhood poverty. Street Angel was released during a time of increasing censorship by the Nationalist government, and general conservatism in films. The Central Film Censorship Committee (CFCC) and more restrictive censorship laws instituted by the KMT, forced many left-wing films to either ‘fix’ certain lines of dialogue and plot elements or be banned. Subsequently, films like Street Angel borrowed "acceptable" elements from Hollywood in order to circumvent censorship.

=== Music ===
During the 1930s, Chinese filmmakers were inclined to view cinema as a Western invention; consequently, filmmakers in China felt the need to incorporate indigenous and cultural elements that would be deemed more appropriate for Chinese audiences, which they achieved primarily through the inclusion of Chinese soundtracks.

As one of the early sound films in China, Street Angel is often praised for its innovative use of music, as well as its unique mix of melodrama and comedy. One sequence in particular, where Xiao Chen and his friends attempt to act as barbers, reveals a moment of slapstick or physical comedy in the otherwise dolorous third act.

The film also features several significant musical interludes. Two original songs featured in Street Angel are "Song of the Four Seasons" (四季歌) and "The Wandering Songstress" (天涯歌女), both composed by He Luting, with lyrics by Tian Han. He Luting adapted the scores from two urban folk ballads from Suzhou, "Crying on the Seventh Seven Day Cycle" (哭七七) and "One Who Knows Me Well" (知心客) respectively. Like the character of Xiao Hong, Zhou Xuan herself had barely escaped being sold: at the age of ten, she managed to avoid being sold to a brothel, and was instead apprenticed to a song and dance troupe based in Shanghai. She became known as the "golden voice", and after she performed the two aforementioned songs in the film, they became popularized and have come to be recognized as musical expressions of turbulent 1930s-era life in China. These two songs continue to be considered two of the most famous songs in modern Chinese culture, and amongst other popular songs at the time, were used to express and emphasize national Chinese characteristics, distinguishing Chinese culture from that of the West.

"The Wandering Songstress" was derived from tanci (a traditional story–telling performance originating in Suzhou). It combined traditional elements and was accompanied by Chinese music instruments, including Erhu (a two–string bowed instrument), Pipa, and Sanxian.

While both songs were essential to the film's success, “Song of the Four Seasons” proved pivotal since it was performed alongside pseudo-documentary war footage. “Song of the Four Seasons” offers an insight into the Chinese situation of the 1930s, especially the suffering of people: it entrances the audience with its lyrical description of a maiden driven away from her home, the musical tale accompanied by a montage of war images that evoked Japan's invasion of Manchuria. Because the footage was played alongside the performance of a love song, the film was able to deliver a message condemning the Japanese invasion without falling foul of censorship restrictions. In late 1930s Shanghai, the National Party exercised strict control over cultural production, meaning that any reference to the Japanese invasion was prohibited, to avoid provoking the masses into rising up against Japan's military aggression.

According to scholar Jean Ma, the differences in the two songs present two separate fates for Xiao Hong: she could either become the possession of the wealthy teahouse client, Mr. Gu, or the lover of the poor musician, Xiao Chen. There are also differences in the film's thematic articulation of the songs, as Xiao Hong demonstrates her values and affection in her performance of "The Wandering Songstress," but shows more resistance in her performance of "Song of the Four Seasons".

=== Theatrical elements ===
Street Angel constructed a theatrical-style mise-en-scène by using the distinctive element of a back alley, known as a lilong (⾥弄) or a longtang (弄堂) in Shanghai. Lilongs are a typical architectural feature in Shanghai that can be dated back to the city's founding. Due to the planned design of the city, people's gazes directed the viewer's attention from a higher position to a lower position as the houses were built on two levels. The lower floor became the focus, as they are the object of the woman's gaze in the illustration. This type of composition can be seen in periodicals from the 1880s onwards, as well as in collections such as 'An Illustrated Explanation of Local Customs' (⾵俗志圖說,) and 'A Hundred Beauties of Shanghai' (海上百艷圖,). The theater is used as a model to represent the urban streets and alleys of Shanghai. People's downward gaze from the box seats is similar to that of the characters in the picture: overlooking alleys from the second floor. Therefore, Shanghai's alleys are fundamentally theatrical in nature. In Street Angel, the setting enhances the mise-en-scène in the way that it features people leaning out of windows and watching alleys. When the shot returns to the balcony, it signals the narrative beginning. Many shots in Street Angel are from second-storey windows, reminding viewers of the composition of the lithographed illustration and the view from the box seats in stage theaters. Also, the shots between Xiao Hong and Xiao Chen's second-floor rooms maintain the practice of theatrical spectatorship. The equal attention devoted between Xiao Hong and Xiao Chen, which is created by a 180 pan, is similar to the exchanges between men and women in box seats in the theater. Lighting plays a huge role in Shanghai theater where the light source and strength of light portrays different emotions, thus supplementing the actors, Ni Yi states. Xiao Hong is shown in the dark in Street Angel, which portrays him as feeling morose. “Left-leaning theater activity”, states Tarryn Li-Min Chun (陳琍敏; Chén Límǐn), “is mostly taken out into the streets and tailoring its exigencies of political transformation than on stage techniques. Street Angel, also being a left-wing movie, follows suit with having most of the scenes out in the street.

== Reception ==
As a film of 'new citizens', Street Angel represents left-wing films that describe the struggles of the urban underclass amidst a time when China was facing multiple national issues in regards to the military and the economy. When the military conflict between China and Japan during the Second Sino-Japanese War broke out, the film was exemplarily in solidifying the mainstream status of 'new citizen' films through its thematic music, singing and choreographic art. The film also strengthened classical production types and promoted the national spirit by encouraging Chinese citizens and filmmakers to bypass the destruction that the war brought to national culture in Japanese invaded areas. The realist demonstration of voicelessness amongst the common people surviving in Shanghai let Street Angel lay a foundation of thought and art for the rapid restoration of post-war Chinese film.

Street Angel is now considered a vivid portrait of Shanghai street life in the 1930s, "capturing the earthy energy and wild collective mood swings" that existed in Shanghai culture prior to the onset of the Second Sino-Japanese War. The male lead Zhao Dan described Street Angel as "a film about the lowest strata of society in Shanghai” that has now become one of the classics of the "leftist" filmmaking period in China, which reached its peak in the 1930s. In 2005, Street Angel was selected as one of the Best 100 Chinese Motion Pictures by the 24th Hong Kong Film Awards, ranked 11th.

=== Analysis ===
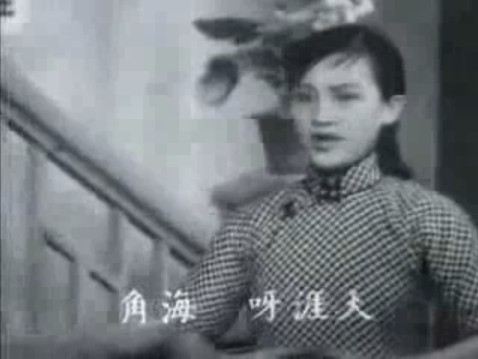
Zhou Xuan as Xiao Hong in Street Angel

Street Angel, a story of solidarity, friendship, and love amongst the dregs of urban society, can be interpreted in different ways. The film successfully "describe[s] the wide gulf between rich and poor in the city" by presenting both bourgeois and proletarian in the Shanghai urban society. According to the Encyclopedia of Chinese Film, Malu Tianshi is "certainly a critique of Shanghai's semi-colonialist society…” in an allegorical and indirect way. Moreover, it has even been described as a Chinese forerunner of Italian neo-realism that offers the audience the inclination to an alternative modernity. As a canonized leftist film, Street Angel constructs allegories to educate the masses to be modern subjects. It, also combines Hollywood and Soviet film techniques with traditional Chinese narrative arts. Although the title recalls Frank Borzage's film of the same name from 1928, some scholars believe the film to have been inspired by Borzage's 1927 film Seventh Heaven. In addition to the clear American inspiration, the notable Soviet influence appears in such formal choices as the extensive use of quick cuts of close-ups, and in the visually-captivating opening sequence. These techniques are often seen in other classic films such as the 1935 film City Scenes (都市风光). Accordingly, the dazzling three-minute opening sequence of Street Angel displays “a key trope of the cinematic portrayal of 1930s Shanghai: the simultaneous existence of competing forces from different colonial powers.” Moreover, film scholars such as Guo-Juin Hong emphasized that the “tensions among various visual and aural elements are arranged in an ostensibly chronological order, a form also popular in the European avant-garde cinema of the 1920s.”

Alexander Des Forges of the University of Massachusetts-Boston argues that Xiao Chen, not Xiao Hong, is "the primary recipient of the heterosexual gaze". Throughout the film, Chen captures the attention of not only his eventual wife Xiao Hong, but also two of his landladies. Unlike the more effeminate Chinese male stars of earlier years, Zhao Dan represents a different kind of masculinity as a male star, with a "jokey and hyperactive sexuality".

=== Left-wing movement ===
The left-wing movement began in 1930, although it was officially founded in 1932. The movement within the cinematic world emphasized on campaigning for anti–imperialism, class struggle and the possibility of change. The movement also led to the foundation of the China Film Culture Society (中国电影文化协会) in February, 1933. Some capitalist film studio owners and petty bourgeois filmmakers had the idea to resist Japanese aggression and change society, to a certain degree paralleling the paradigm of the left wing. Consequently, the “Chinese Film Culture Movement (中国电影文化运动)” replaced the “Chinese Left Wing Film Movement,” as increasing numbers of professionals in the film production industry joined the China Film Culture Society.

The themes of films considered left-wing were usually associated with class struggle; this concretely became the major theme as the movement progressed. Films about class struggle were often filmed from the perspective of laboring underclass people. Until early 1936, left-wing organizations in literature and art circles were dissolved because of the intensified Japanese aggression. As the Mingxing studio was closely tied to left-wing film production, their films aimed to reveal the dimensions of class conflict, causing great responses among viewers. With the sensitivity of political messages within the film and its ability to evoke “calls to action”, Street Angel was not publicly distributed until the end of the Cultural Revolution. From 1949 to 1976, the film was repressed to group focus rather than communal viewing.

== See also ==
- List of films in the public domain in the United States
