= List of TVB series (1995) =

This is a list of series released by or aired on TVB Jade Channel in 1995.

== First line series ==
These dramas aired in Hong Kong from 7:00 to 8:00 pm, Monday to Friday on TVB.

Airing date	English title (Chinese title)	Number of episodes	Main cast	Theme song (T) Sub-theme song (ST)	Genre	Notes	Official website
9 January– 3 Feb	The Romance of the White Hair Maiden 白髮魔女傳	20	Ada Choi, Timmy Ho, Gary Chan, Jessie Chan	T: "等你到白頭" (Eric Moo & Cass Phang)	Costume drama	Released overseas on December 3, 1994. Copyright notice: 1994.	
6 February– 3 Mar	The Change of Fate 命轉乾坤	20	Cheung Kwok Keung, Timmy Ho, Gigi Fu, Evergreen Mak, Lau Dan	T: "多添一點真" (David Lui)	Modern drama	Released overseas in 1994. Copyright notice: 1994 (Eps. 1–19), 1995 (Ep. 20).	
6 Mar- 31 Mar	Man of Wisdom II 金牙大狀(貳)	20	Lawrence Cheng, Timmy Ho, Christine Ng, Fiona Leung	T: "孔子曰" (Roman Tam)	Costume drama	Sequel to 1993's Man of Wisdom.	
3 April– 28 Apr	Plain Love 情濃大地	20	Gallen Lo, Kathy Chow, Eddie Cheung	T: "故地濃情" (Kenny Ho)	Period drama	Released overseas on August 21, 1994. Copyright notice: 1994.	
1 May– 26 May	Justice Pao 包青天(香港版)	20	Ti Lung, Felix Wong, Liu Kai Chi	T: "願世間有青天" (George Lam)	Costume drama		
29 May– 23 Jun	Forty Something 男人四十一頭家	20	Adam Cheng, Amy Chan, Bowie Lam	T: "男人四十一頭家" (Adam Cheng)	Modern drama		
26 June– 4 Aug	Down Memory Lane 萬里長情	30	Alex Man, Michelle Yim, Frankie Lam, Kenix Kwok, Dominic Lam	T: "心聲共鳴" (Andy Lau)	Period drama		
7 August– 1 Sep	Stepping Stones 總有出頭天	20	Leo Ku, Gabriel Harrison, Shirley Cheung, Cherie Chan, May Kwong	T: "分甘同味" (Natalis Chan & Alan Tam)	Modern drama		
4 September– 29 September	Debts of a Life Time 忘情闊少爺	20	Jackie Lui, Gigi Fu, Marco Ngai, Hilary Tsui	T: "還我真情" (Alan Tam)	Modern drama		
2 October– 27 October	From Act to Act 娛樂插班生	20	Gordon Lam, Liu Wai Hung, Vivien Leung, Elvina Kong, Cutie Mui	T: "是是非非是是非" (Natalis Chan)	Modern drama		
30 October– 24 November	A Good Match from Heaven 天降奇緣	20	Deric Wan, Jessica Hsuan, Amy Kwok, John Chiang, Kiki Sheung, Cutie Mui, Joey Leung, Louis Yuen	T: "天降奇緣" (Deric Wan)	Modern drama		
27 November 1995- 16 February 1996	Justice Pao II 包青天II(香港版)	60	Ti Lung, Felix Wong, Liu Kai Chi	T: "願世間有青天" (George Lam)	Costume drama	Sequel to 1995's Justice Pao. Copyright notice: 1995 (Eps. 21–59), 1996 (Eps. 60–80).	

== Second line series ==
These dramas aired in Hong Kong from 9:35 to 10:35 pm, Monday to Friday on TVB.

Airing date	English title (Chinese title)	Number of episodes	Main cast	Theme song (T) Sub-theme song (ST)	Genre	Notes	Official website
16 January– 13 February	The Trail of Love 前世冤家	20	Tong Chun Chung, Margie Tsang, Elizabeth Lee, Bobby Au Yeung, Leo Ku	T: "夢中人" (Faye Wong)	Modern drama	Copyright notice: 1994.	
13 February– 10 March	Hand of Hope 邊緣故事	20	Gallen Lo, Amy Chan, Marco Ngai, Angie Cheung	T: "真面目" (Hacken Lee)	Modern drama		
13 March- 7 April	Detective Investigation Files 刑事偵緝檔案	20	Michael Tao, Kenix Kwok, Joey Leung, Louisa So	T: "感情真相" (Leo Ku); ST: "對你始終痴心一往" (Leo Ku)	Modern suspense	Prequel to 1995's Detective Investigation Files II.	Official website
10 April– 5 May	Fist of Power 南拳北腿	20	Louis Fan, Moon Lee, Vivien Leung, Evergreen Mak	T: "天地豪情" (Eric Moo)	Costume action		
8 May– 2 June	Corruption Doesn't Pay 廉政英雌	20	Sheren Tang, Esther Kwan, Alex Fong, Kiki Sheung, Savio Tsang	T: "出色女子 " (Cass Phang)	Modern action		
5 June– 30 June	To Love With Love 水餃皇后	20	Nadia Chan, Timmy Ho, Wayne Lai	T: "愛到一千年" (Nadia Chan)	Modern drama		Official website
3 July- 30 July	The Criminal Investigator; O記實錄	22	Felix Wong, Kenix Kwok, Sunny Chan	T: "烈火狂奔" (Jacky Cheung)	Modern drama	Prequel to 1996's The Criminal Investigator II. Released overseas on March 30, 1995.	
31 July– 9 September	The Condor Heroes 95 神鵰俠侶	32	Louis Koo, Carmen Lee, Gigi Fu, Bonnie Ngai, Jason Lau, Gordon Liu	T: "神話情話" (Emil Chau & Chyi Yu)	Costume action		
11 September- 13 October	File of Justice IV 壹號皇庭IV	25	Bobby Au Yeung, Michael Tao, Amy Chan, Bowie Lam, Jessica Hsuan, Sheren Tang, William So	ST: "假使有日能忘記" (William So)	Modern drama	Sequel to 1994's File of Justice III. Prequel to 1997's File of Justice V.	
16 October– 10 November	The Unexpected 一切從失蹤開始	20	Damian Lau, Esther Kwan, Bowie Lam, Cheung Kwok Keung, Maggie Cheung	T: "從未改變" (Eric Moo) ST: "注定相愛" (Cass Phang & Jeff Chang)	Modern drama		
13 November– 8 December	A Stage of Turbulence 刀馬旦	20	Vivian Chow, Sunny Chan, Patrick Tam, Fiona Leung	T: "紅顏知己" (Vivian Chow)	Period drama		
11 December 1995- 2 February 1996	Detective Investigation Files II 刑事偵緝檔案II	40	Michael Tao, Kenix Kwok, Joey Leung, Louisa So, Amy Kwok, Sammi Cheng	T: "為明日爭氣" (Edmond Leung); ST: "愛與情" (Edmond Leung); ST: "愛的輓歌" (Sammi Cheng)	Modern suspense	Sequel to 1995's Detective Investigation Files. Prequel to 1997's Detective Investigation Files III. Copyright notice: 1995 (Eps. 1-27), 1996 (Eps. 28–40).	Official website

== Third line series ==
These dramas aired in Hong Kong from 10:35 to 11:05 pm, Monday to Friday on TVB.

Airing date	English title (Chinese title)	Number of episodes	Main cast	Theme song (T) Sub-theme song (ST)	Genre	Notes	Official website
10 October 1994- 12 May 1995	Happy Harmony 餐餐有宋家	156	Angelina Lo, Vincent Wan, Betsy Cheung, Natalie Wong, Louis Koo, Jessica Hsuan, Vincent Lam		Modern sitcom		
15 May 1995- 17 November 1999	A Kindred Spirit 真情	1128	Louise Lee, Lau Dan, Nancy Sit, Kenix Kwok, Sunny Chan, Louisa So, Florence Kwok, Hawick Lau, Kingdom Yuen, David Lui, Melissa Ng, Michael Tse, Joyce Tang, Fiona Yuen, Joe Ma	T: "無悔愛你一生" (Joyce Lee)	Modern sitcom	Copyright notice: 1995 (Eps. 1-59), 1996 (Eps. 60-212), 1997 (Eps. 213–320), 1998 (Eps. 321–469), 1999 (Eps. 470–590).	Official website

== Other series ==
Airing date	English title (Chinese title)	Number of episodes	Main cast	Theme song (T) Sub-theme song (ST)	Genre	Notes	Official website
7 February– 4 March	The Holy Dragon Saga 箭俠恩仇	20	Frankie Lam, Catherine Hung, Marco Ngai	T: "心箭" (Shirley Kwan)	Costume drama	Released overseas on August 13, 1994. Copyright notice: 1994.	
12 September- 7 October	The Romantic Swordsman (New Version) 小李飛刀	20	Eddie Kwan, Chin Ka Lok, Emily Kwan, Gigi Fu	T: "清心明月照" (William So)	Costume action	Released overseas on September 25, 1994. Copyright notice: 1994.	
19 September- 5 October	When A Man Loves a Woman 新同居關係	13	Roger Kwok, Francis Ng, Esther Kwan, Fennie Yuen, Steven Ma, Mariane Chan	ST: "Without You" (Harry Nilsson)	Modern drama		
12 October– 8 November	Swordsman Lai Bo Yee 尋龍劍俠賴布衣	20	Patrick Tam, Vivien Leung, Timmy Ho, Elizabeth Lee	T: "霧中花" (Christopher Wong)	Costume drama	Released overseas on September 5, 1994. Copyright notice: 1994.	
9 November- 6 December	The Fist of Law 大捕快	20	John Chiang, Savio Tsang, Ada Choi, Amy Chan		Costume action	Released overseas on March 30, 1994. Copyright notice: 1994.	
7 December 1995- 3 January 1996	Journey of Love 親恩情未了	20	Violet Lee, Sammi Cheng, June Kan, Marco Ngai, Wallace Chung, Raymond Cho	T: "給母親" (Sammi Cheng)	Modern drama	Released overseas on October 13, 1994. Copyright notice: 1994.	Official website
