= List of TVB series (1994) =

This is a list of series released by or aired on TVB Jade Channel in 1994.

== First line series ==
These dramas aired in Hong Kong from 7:30 to 8:30 pm, Monday to Friday on TVB.

Airing date	English title (Chinese title)	Number of episodes	Main cast	Theme song (T) Sub-theme song (ST)	Genre	Notes	Official website
17 January– 28 Jan	Glittering Moments; CATWALK俏佳人	10	Michael Tao, Kenix Kwok, Hoyan Mok, Mariane Chan, Bowie Lam, William So		Modern drama	Released overseas on October 18, 1993. Copyright notice: 1993.	
31 January– 25 Feb	Trespassing 一夫三妻	20	Liu Wai Hung, Tien Niu	T: "Oh! Ma Ma" (Dicky Cheung)	Modern drama		
28 February– 8 Apr	Conscience 第三類法庭	30	Deric Wan, Maggie Siu, Amy Kwok, Ng Wai Kwok, Sheila Chan	T: "我得到什麼" (Deric Wan)	Modern drama		
11 April– 6 May	Fate of the Last Empire 清宮氣數錄	20	Nadia Chan, Vivien Leung, Timmy Ho, Jimmy Wong	T: "愛念永留" (Nadia Chan)	Costume drama	Released overseas in 1993. Copyright notice: 1993 (Eps. 1-18), 1994 (Eps. 19-20).	
1 August– 16 Sep	The Legend of the Condor Heroes 射鵰英雄傳	35	Julian Cheung, Athena Chu, Gallen Lo, Emily Kwan, Lau Dan, Felix Lok, Wayne Lai, Jessie Chan	T: "絕世絕招" (Julian Cheung & Jacklyn Wu) ST: "难得糊涂" (Julian Cheung)	Costume drama	Lau Dan's comeback series.	
19 September– 14 Oct	Love Cycle 新父子時代	20	Max Mok, Felix Wong, Vivien Leung, Cheung Kwok Keung	T: "人之初" (Max Mok)	Modern drama		
10 October– 11 Nov	Fate of the Clairvoyant 再見亦是老婆	20	Amy Chan, John Chiang, Valerie Chow, Sheren Tang, Vincent Lam	T: "仍然是最愛你" (Cass Phang) ST: "愛你愛到太傷痛" (Cass Phang & Eric Moo)	Modern drama		
14 November– 9 Dec	The Ching Emperor 天子屠龍	20	Julian Cheung, Vivien Leung, Dominic Lam	T: "飛龍在天" (Julian Cheung)	Costume drama		
12 December 1994- 6 January 1995	Filthy Rich 豪門插班生	20	Liu Wai Hung, Sheren Tang, Bryan Leung, Lau Siu Ming, Marco Ngai	T: "平凡人的夢" (Vivian Chow)	Modern drama		

== Second line series ==
These dramas aired in Hong Kong from 9:00 to 10:00 pm, Monday to Friday on TVB.

Airing date	English title (Chinese title)	Number of episodes	Main cast	Theme song (T) Sub-theme song (ST)	Genre	Notes	Official website
9 May– 3 June	Crime and Passion 新重案傳真	20	Michael Tao, Dominic Lam, Cheung Kwok Keung, Yammie Lam	T: "不見不散" (Sally Yeh)	Modern drama	Released overseas on March 21, 1994.	
6 June– 1 July	The Intangible Truth 生死訟	20	Roger Kwok, Sheren Tang, Alex Fong, Esther Kwan	T: "這一次意外" (Jacky Cheung)	Modern drama		
4 July– 29 July	Knot to Treasure 婚姻物語	20	Ekin Cheng, Mariane Chan, Nadia Chan, Louis Koo	T: "戀愛追逐" (Nadia Chan)	Modern drama		
1 August– 26 August	The Master of Martial Arts 黃飛鴻系列之鐵膽梁寬	20	Bryan Leung, Hacken Lee, Jessica Hsuan, Joey Leung, Gigi Fu	T: "人生一切一身擔" (Hacken Lee)	Costume action	Released overseas on May 29, 1994.	
29 August– 23 September	Heartstrings 烈火狂奔	20	Aaron Kwok, Gigi Lai, Fennie Yuen, Mark Cheng, Jimmy Wong	T: "天涯凝望" (Aaron Kwok) ST: "燃亮今生" (Gigi Lai and Aaron Kwok); ST: "因你真正活过" (Gigi Lai)	Modern drama	Released overseas on June 20, 1994.	
26 September– 21 October	Gentle Reflections 恨鎖金瓶	20	Irene Wan, Kenix Kwok, Savio Tsang, Pal Sinn	T: "一醉化千愁" (Irene Wan)	Costume drama		
24 October– 18 November	Class of Distinction 阿SIR早晨	20	Leon Lai, Louis Koo, Jessica Hsuan, Theresa Lee, James Wong	T: "陽光" (Leon Lai)	Modern drama		
21 November- 13 January 1995	Instinct 笑看風雲	40	Adam Cheng, Ekin Cheng, Roger Kwok, Nadia Chan, Chu Kong, Amy Kwok, Leo Ku, Kiki Sheung	T: "笑看風雲" (Adam Cheng)	Modern drama		Official website

== Third line series ==
These dramas aired in Hong Kong from 10:15 to 10:45 pm, Monday to Friday on TVB.

Airing date	English title (Chinese title)	Number of episodes	Main cast	Theme song (T) Sub-theme song (ST)	Genre	Notes	Official website
10 May 1993- 7 October 1994	Mind Our Own Business 開心華之里	325	Liu Kai Ji, Michelle Yim, Marco Ngai, Esther Kwan	T: "歡笑末世紀" (Leon Lai)	Modern sitcom		
10 October 1994- 12 May 1995	Happy Harmony 餐餐有宋家	156	Angelina Lo, Vincent Wan, Betsy Cheung, Natalie Wong, Louis Koo, Jessica Hsuan, Vincent Lam		Modern sitcom		

== Other series ==
Airing date	English title (Chinese title)	Number of episodes	Main cast	Theme song (T) Sub-theme song (ST)	Genre	Notes	Official website
3 Jan- 28 Jan	The Last Conquest 俠女游龍	20	Gallen Lo, Loletta Lee	T: "不應再想你" (Loletta Lee)	Costume drama	Released overseas on October 2, 1993. Copyright notice: 1993.	
7 Feb- 4 Mar	The Legend of the Golden Lion 金毛獅王	20	Vincent Wan, Ng Wai Kwok, Anita Lee	T: "笑問誰做到" (David Lui)	Costume drama	Released overseas on August 7, 1993. Copyright notice: 1993.	
7 Feb- 25 Feb	The Lone Star Swordsman 孤星劍	15	Ekin Cheng, Vivien Leung, Marco Ngai	T: "情義難存" (Ekin Cheng)	Costume drama	Released overseas on May 15, 1993. Copyright notice: 1993.	
16 Mar- 12 Apr	The Condor Heroes Return 射鵰英雄傳之南帝北丐	20	Ekin Cheng, Marco Ngai, Charine Chan	T: "一生不醉醒" (Jacky Cheung)	Costume drama	Released overseas on October 25, 1993. Copyright notice: 1993.	
20 Apr- 17 May	Remembrance 黃埔傾情	20	Julian Cheung, David Siu, Kenix Kwok	T: "傾情" (Julian Cheung)	Period drama	Released overseas on January 31, 1994.	
5 Jul- 30 Jul	Love is Blind 成日受傷的男人	20	Liu Wai Hung, Kathy Chow, Jimmy Wong, Cutie Mui	T: "其實你乜都無做過" (Hacken Lee)	Modern drama	Released overseas on September 6, 1993. Copyright notice: 1993.	
19 Jul- 13 Aug	Eternity 千歲情人	20	Faye Wong, Alex Fong, Bowie Lam, Jessica Hsuan	T: "動心" (Faye Wong)	Modern drama	Released overseas on August 27, 1993. Copyright notice: 1993.	
31 Jul- 28 Aug	ICAC Investigators 1994 廉政行動1994	5	Bowie Lam		Modern drama	In collaboration with ICAC.	
16 Aug- 10 Sep	Shade of Darkness 異度凶情	20	Canti Lau, Lau Siu Ming, Fiona Leung, Kenix Kwok, Ada Choi	T: "異度凶情" (Canti Lau)	Modern drama	Released overseas on June 6, 1994.	
13 Sep- 12 Oct	Mystery of the Sabre 獨臂刀客	20	Chin Siu Hoe, Jimmy Au, Yeung Ling	T: "獨行我路" (李國祥) ST: "想擁抱的還是你" (Lee Kwok Cheung & Liz Kong)	Costume drama	Released overseas on February 20, 1994.	
10 Oct- 28 Oct	File of Justice III 壹號皇庭III	20	Bobby Au Yeung, Michael Tao, William So, Bowie Lam, Amy Chan		Modern drama	Sequel to 1993's File of Justice II. Prequel to 1995's File of Justice IV. Released overseas on July 25, 1994.	Official website
23 Oct- 19 Nov	The Emperor and I 方世玉與乾隆皇	20	Eddie Cheung, Marco Ngai, Jessie Chan, Maggie Chan	T: "笑問江湖" (Roman Tam)	Costume drama	Released overseas on March 14, 1994.	
3 Dec- 31 Dec	The Kung Fu Kid 螳螂小子	15	Gary Chan, David Siu, Gordon Liu, Fiona Leung	T: "今夜星光" (Alex To)	Period drama	Released overseas on December 7, 1990. Copyright notice: 1990.	
12 Dec- 6 Jan 1995	The Conspiracy of the Eunuch 南俠展昭	20	Ng Wai Kwok, Savio Tsang, Sheren Tang, Newton Lai, Jessie Chan	T: "南俠展昭" (Tai Chi)	Costume drama	Released overseas on November 7, 1993. Copyright notice: 1993.	

== Warehoused series ==
These dramas were released overseas and have not broadcast on TVB Jade Channel.

Oversea released date	English title (Chinese title)	Number of episodes	Main cast	Theme song (T) Sub-theme song (ST)	Genre	Notes	Official website
24 Jan- 18 Feb	Happy Returns 1994; 94喜相逢	20	Marco Ngai, Fiona Leung, Simon Lui	T: "94喜相逢" (Canti Lau)	Modern drama		
