= List of TVB series (1993) =

This is a list of series released by or aired on TVB Jade Channel in 1993.

== First line series ==
These dramas aired in Hong Kong from 7:30 to 8:30 pm, Monday to Friday on TVB.

Airing date	English title (Chinese title)	Number of episodes	Main cast	Theme song (T) Sub-theme song (ST)	Genre	Notes	Official website
4 Jan- 29 Jan	Happy Return 老襯喜相逢	20	Marco Ngai, Fiona Leung, Sher Ng, Tai Chi Wai	T: "Moshi Moshi Moshi" (Canti Lau)	Modern drama		
1 Feb- 26 Feb	The Predictor's Game 飛星尋龍	20	Liu Wai Hung, Fiona Leung, Gary Chan	T: "飛星尋龍" (Kenny Bee)	Modern drama	Copyright notice: 1992 (Eps. 1-13 & 18-20), 1993 (Eps. 14-17).	
1 Mar- 26 Mar	The Legendary Ranger 原振俠	20	Leon Lai, Michele Reis, Faye Wong, Athena Chu, Hugo Ng	T: "願你今夜別離去" (Leon Lai) ST: "真的愛情定可到未來" (Leon Lai); ST: "我的另一半" (Leon Lai); ST: "內疚" (Leon Lai)	Modern wuxia fantasy		Official website
29 Mar- 21 May	The Link 天倫	40	Eddie Kwan, Gigi Lai, Amy Kwok, David Siu, Ada Choi, Dominic Lam	T: "該走的時候" (Andy Lau)	Modern drama		Official website
24 May- 18 Jun	Being Honest 雌雄大老千	20	Eddie Cheung, Kathy Chow	T: "天生不是情造" (王菲)	Modern drama		Official website
21 Jun- 16 Jul	Man of Wisdom 金牙大狀	20	Lawrence Cheng, Ada Choi, Rain Lau, Savio Tsang, Dominic Lam	T: "做人做到底" (Roman Tam)	Costume drama	Prequel to 1995's Man of Wisdom II.	
19 Jul- 13 Aug	Gambling on Life 賭霸天下	20	Eddie Kwan, Fiona Leung, Vincent Lam	T: "仍是兩手空" (Alex To)	Modern drama		
16 Aug- 10 Sep	The Heroes From Shaolin 武尊少林	20	Deric Wan, Eddie Cheung, Gigi Lai, Vivien Leung, Michael Tao, Amy Kwok	T: "投入生命" (Deric Wan) ST: "情深海更深" (黎姿)	Costume drama		
13 Sep- 8 Oct	Top Cop 超能幹探SUPERCOP	20	Canti Lau, Roger Kwok, Wing Lam, Angela Pang		Modern drama		
11 Oct- 3 Dec	Racing Peak 馬場大亨	40	Felix Wong, Amy Chan, Kenneth Tsang, Fiona Leung, Ada Choi, Vincent Wan	ST: "一世風雲" (Alan Tam)	Modern drama	Felix Wong's comeback series.	
6 Dec 1993– 14 Jan 1994	The Edge of Righteousness 龍兄鼠弟	30	Alex Man, Dicky Cheung, Monica Chan, Jessica Hsuan, Athena Chu, Kent Cheng, Cutie Mui	T: "現實是場夢" (Andy Lau)	Modern drama		

== Second line series ==
These dramas aired in Hong Kong from 9:00 to 10:00 pm, Monday to Friday on TVB.

Airing date	English title (Chinese title)	Number of episodes	Main cast	Theme song (T) Sub-theme song (ST)	Genre	Notes	Official website
25 Jan- 19 Feb	Romance Beyond 都市的童話	20	Frankie Lam, Athena Chu, Vincent Lam	T: "傻痴痴" (黎明) ST: "情難自控" (黎明); ST: "我的感觉是场梦" (黎明)	Modern drama	Copyright notice: 1992.	
22 Feb- 19 Mar	The Partner 怒火羔羊	20	Mark Cheng, Amy Chan, Jimmy Wong, Carol Yeung, Lily Chung	T "冷靜" (David Lui)	Modern drama	Copyright notice: 1992 (Eps. 1-5), 1993 (Eps. 6-20).	Official website
22 Mar- 16 Apr	The Vampire Returns 大頭綠衣鬥殭屍	20	Sammi Cheng, Siu-ho Chin, Wayne Lai	T: "癡心等待" (鄭秀文) ST: "總算為情認真過" (鄭秀文)	Costume drama		
19 Apr- 14 May	The Mystery of the Condor Hero 射鵰英雄傳之九陰真經	20	David Chiang, Julian Cheung, Fiona Leung, Maple Hui	T: "亂世桃花" (George Lam & Sally Yeh)	Costume action		
17 May- 11 Jun	The Yang's Women Warriors 九彩霸王花	20	Maggie Siu, Sheila Chan, Gallen Lo	T: "付出許多的愛情" (Vivian Chow)	Modern drama		
14 Jun- 9 Jul	The Buddhism Palm Strikes Back 如來神掌再戰江湖	20	Ada Choi, Eddie Kwan, Elvina Kong	T: "如來神掌" (Jacky Cheung)	Costume drama		
12 Jul- 6 Aug	To Chord the Victory 少年五虎	20	Mickey Chu, Wallace Chung, Athena Chu, Marco Ngai, Joe Cheng, William So, Louis Yuen	T: "共渡風雨路" (The Wynners)	Modern drama		
9 Aug- 6 May	Justice Bao 包青天	230	Kenny Ho	T: "願世間有青天" (George Lam)	Costume drama	First drama acquired from Taiwan.	

== Third line series ==
These dramas aired in Hong Kong from 10:15 to 10:45 pm, Monday to Friday on TVB.

Airing date	English title (Chinese title)	Number of episodes	Main cast	Theme song (T) Sub-theme song (ST)	Genre	Notes	Official website
23 Nov 1992– 7 May 1993	Class of 93' 愛生事家庭	117	Ha Yu, Deric Wan, Irene Wan	T: "愛生事家庭" (Ha Yu, Deric Wan, & Irene Wan)	Modern sitcom		
10 May 1993– 7 Oct 1994	Mind Our Own Business 開心華之里	325	Liu Kai Ji, Michelle Yim, Marco Ngai, Esther Kwan	T: "歡笑末世紀" (Leon Lai)	Modern sitcom		

== Other series ==
Airing date	English title (Chinese title)	Number of episodes	Main cast	Theme song (T) Sub-theme song (ST)	Genre	Notes	Official website
18 Apr- 25 Jul	File of Justice II 壹號皇庭II	15	Michael Tao, Bobby Au Yeung, Amy Chan, William So, Faye Wong		Modern drama	Sequel to 1992's File of Justice. Prequel to 1994's File of Justice III.	Official website
8 Jun- 3 Jul	Golden Snake Sword 金蛇郎君	20	Ekin Cheng, Angela Pang, Jaqueline Law	T: "无梦的诗" (蒋志光/彭家丽 - Rams Cheung/Angela Pang)	Costume drama	Released overseas on June 1, 1992. Copyright notice: 1992.	
27 Sep- 15 Oct	The Hero from Shanghai 梟情	15	Gallen Lo, Maggie Siu, Eddie Cheung	T: "等你一生" (Cally Kwong)	Period drama	Released overseas on November 23, 1992. Copyright notice: 1992.	
26 Oct- 20 Nov	All About Tin 魔刀俠情	20	Deric Wan, Hung Catherine, Ada Choi, Eddie Cheung	T: "仍是深爱你" (温兆伦)	Costume drama	Released overseas on January 31, 1993.	
27 Oct- 23 Nov	For Home's Sake 居者冇其屋	20	Amy Chan, Liu Kai Chi, Michael Tao, Bowie Lam, Karen Tong	T: "情濃半生" (Jacky Cheung & Karen Tong)	Modern drama	Released overseas on April 12, 1993.	
24 Nov- 21 Dec	Folk Sergeant 妙探出更	20	Amy Chan, Ha Yu	T: "拼命三郎" (Tai Chi)	Modern drama	Released overseas on July 27, 1992. Copyright notice: 1992.	
25 Nov- 22 Dec	The Art of Being Together 偷心大少	20	Bowie Lam, Yammie Lam, Amy Kwok	T: "愛慾迷宮" (Bowie Lam)	Modern drama	Released overseas on March 28, 1993. Copyright notice: 1992 (Ep. 1), 1993 (Eps. 2-20).	
30 Nov- 25 Dec	The Spirit of Love 精靈酒店	20	Frankie Lam, Nadia Chan, Kenneth Chan	T: "幸運在你面前" (Nadia Chan)	Modern drama	Released overseas on November 1, 1993.	

== Warehoused series ==
These dramas were released overseas and have not broadcast on TVB Jade Channel.

Oversea released date	English title (Chinese title)	Number of episodes	Main cast	Theme song (T) Sub-theme song (ST)	Genre	Notes	Official website
8 Mar- 2 Apr	Five Knights from Shanghai 精武五虎	20	Frankie Lam, Jimmy Au, Gordon Liu, Elvina Kong	T: "不如重新開始" (Sandy Lam)	Period drama		
