= Gregory Charles Rivers filmography =

Gregory Charles Rivers (Chinese: 河國榮; 1965 – 2024) was an Australian-born Hong Kong actor known for his roles in TVB shows. He was dubbed "TVB's token gweilo" (white person) for appearing in over 300 TVB shows as stereotypical Caucasian characters.

== Television ==
=== TVB ===
Year	Title	Role	Notes
1988	Fate Cast in the Wind		Television debut
1988	Twilight of a Nation		
1988	The Legend of Master Chan		
1989	The Iron Butterfly	Senior police officer	
1989	The Justice of Life		
1989	Song Bird		
1990	Cherished Moments		
1990	Blood of Good and Evil	Police Superintendent	
1990	When Things Get Tough	Inspector Chan	
1990	It Runs in the Family	Australian buyer	
1990	The Challenge of Life		
1990	The Iron Butterfly II: See No Daylight		
1991	On The Edge		
1991	Man from Guangdong		
1992	The Greed of Man	Police constable	
1993	The Hero from Shanghai		Cameo
1993	The Spirit of Love		Cameo
1994	Instinct		
1995	Detective Investigation Files	Police constable	
1995	The Criminal Investigator		
1995	Corruption Doesn't Pay	Lu Tsu (陸徐)	episode 10
1995	Fist of Power	William Robinson (羅便臣)	episode 11
1996	The Criminal Investigator II		
1997	Old Time Buddy		
1998	Healing Hands		
1998	The Duke of Mount Deer		
1999	Face to Face		
2000	Armed Reaction II		
2001	Virtues of Harmony		
2002	Golden Faith		Cameo
2002	Family Man	Pierre	
2002	Police Station No. 7	Policeman	
2003	Aqua Heroes		
2003	Point of No Return	Chung Sir / William	
2003	Triumph in The Skies	Eddie	
2003	Vigilante Force		
2003	The 'W' Files		
2003	Ups and Downs in the Sea of Love		
2004	To Get Unstuck in Time		
2004	Armed Reaction IV		
2004	A Handful of Love		
2004	To Catch The Uncatchable		
2004	Angels of Mission		
2005	The Gâteau Affairs	Chef	
2005	Always Ready	Paul Stevens	
2005	Into Thin Air	William Hunter	
2005	War of In-Laws		
2005	Healing Hands III		
2005	The Prince's Shadow		
2005	Life Made Simple		
2006	La Femme Desperado		
2006	Under the Canopy of Love		
2006	C.I.B. Files	Police officer	
2006	Bar Bender		
2006	Dicey Business		
2006	Steps		
2007	Life Art		
2007	War and Destiny		
2007	Phoenix Rising		
2007	The Brink of Law		
2007	The Ultimate Crime Fighter		
2007	Word Twisters' Adventures		
2008	A Journey Called Life		
2008	Forensic Heroes II	Ben Au	
2023	Dead Ringer	Brandon	Final television role

=== Other productions ===
Year	Title	Role	Notes
2016	Margaret and David – Green Bean		
2017	Psycho Detective		
2018	VR Exorcist		
2018	If Love Was Not Timeless		
2019	Reboot		
2022	Flying Tiger 3		
2022	Into the Wild	Tony	

== Film ==
Year	Title	Role	Notes
1989	Casino Raiders	Bellboy	
1989	Thunder Cops II		
1990	A Bite of Love	Thief	
1990	A Punch to Revenge		
1990	Shanghai, Shanghai	British guard	
1990	The Figures from Earth	Policeman	
1990	The Big Score	Senior police officer	
1995	Legendary Couple	Officer John	
1996	Banana Club	Mr. Richards	
2012	Floating City	Greg McCordie	
2015	Get Outta Here		
2015	Little Big Master	Tony	
2017	OCTB		
2019	My People, My Country		
2021	All U Need Is Love		
2022	Man on the Edge	CS Richard Harrison	
2023	Everything Under Control	Wong Sir	Final film role
