= The Good Old Days (Hong Kong TV series) =

- Genre: Period romance
- Starring: Amy Chan; Steve Ma; Sheren Tang; Gilbert Lam; Maggie Siu; Kiki Sheung; Vincent Lam
- Opening theme: Glorious Sun (艷陽) by Amy Chan
- Ending theme: Behind All Women by Amy Chan
- Country of origin: Hong Kong
- Original language: Cantonese
- No. of episodes: 105

Production
- Producer: Yeung Siu Hung (also director)
- Running time: 45 minutes (approx.)

Original release
- Network: ATV
- Release: 1996

The Good Old Days (再見艷陽天) was a television drama produced by Hong Kong broadcaster Asia Television in 1996. It was first aired from 15 April 1996 to 20 September 1996. The series is one of several ATV series that was well received in viewership ratings. After the network shut down in 2015, broadcasting rights along with many other ATV dramas were sold to rival network TVB for 17 million HKD.

== Plot ==
The drama series takes place around the days of the Nationalists' Republic of China, and also Warlord Era and World War II. The era itself was considered as the most turbulent period in China's modern history. It depicts how the three women, Sau Hau, Man Fung and Ding Man, strive for their own way of living during this time.

The story begins in a small village in the 1920s with Sau Hau (Amy Chan) becoming a servant for the powerful Fong family who owns a winery. The Fong family takes a liking to her and arranges a marriage between her and their eldest son, Ho Sang (Steve Ma) who is away on a trip in Guangzhou. Meanwhile, while on his trip, Ho Sang meets Man Fung (Sheren Tang) who has just been sold by her mother from the village unknowingly into prostitution. Ho Sang saves her just in time and the two begin a relationship. When Ho Sang returns to his village, he is furious at the arranged marriage to Sau Hau but eventually agrees due to his mother's illness. He is extremely cold to Sau Hau and distances himself from her, while continuing to see Man Fung when he returns to Guangzhou for work and tells her that he does not have feelings for Sau Hau. However, as time progresses, he eventually warms up to Sau Hau and begins a relationship with her with Man Fung unaware. Sau Hau's friend, Pui Pui (Kiki Sheung) is forcibly sold by her father and married to a local abusive warlord as his sixth wife.

Ho Sang makes the decision to enlist in the army for the Northern Expedition and leaves his home behind to the disapproval of Man Fung, Sau Hau, and his family. Later, Man Fung and Sau Hau both discover they are pregnant. When Man Fung returns home to her mother, she is discovered by the village and almost killed by Sai Fan (Paul Chun) for being pregnant as a single woman. She reveals that the baby is Ho Sang's and hence, Sai Fan's grandchild. Sau Hau saves her and Ho Sang writes a letter home to confirm this. Man Fung is married into the Fong family as Ho Sang's second wife but is disliked by the family especially when Sau Hau has a miscarriage after saving her. Conflicts arise between Sau Hau and Man Fung but they begin to form a strong understanding of each other and develop a friendship.

When the Fong family loses their business and goes bankrupt, Sau Hau and Man Fung go to Guangzhou to try to start a business for the family. After months of failure, they come across a woman of high status, Fung Chi (Lee Heung Kam) who admires them for their work in sewing. They collaborate to start a fabric company together and the Fong family comes to Guangzhou as their business thrives. Meanwhile, Ho Sang has been declared dead. Sau Hau and Man Fung are distraught. Man Fung develops feelings for Sai Bong (Vincent Lam), Fung Chi's son. Pui Pui begins working for the Fong family after her abusive husband disappears and later marries Sai Fan as his third wife.

Years later, Ho Sang returns home, married to Ding Man (Maggie Shiu), a nurse he met during his time in the north. He had been suffering from amnesia until recently. Man Fung asks for a divorce and marries Sai Bong while joining his business. The Japanese Army invades Guangzhou and part of the Fong family heads to Hong Kong, only to return, after Japan decides to attack Hong Kong. Pui Pui goes missing on the journey and is presumed dead. Ho Sang discovers his friend Lok Ping (Wong Chong Kwan), who he met during the Northern Expedition, is a guerrilla helping the Chinese Army. Sai Bong and Man Fung are forced into collaborating with the Japanese Army, but secretly help Lok Ping. However, other guerrillas assassinate Sai Bong for being a traitor, not yet realizing he is a double agent.

Ho Sang is suspected of being a guerrilla and is arrested by the Japanese Army. Due to negotiations, he is sent away to do hard labour instead of being executed. As World War II comes to an end in 1945, Man Fung, her daughter, and Fung Chi go to Hong Kong due to the risk of them being deemed as traitors. Pui Pui is revealed to be alive. Ding Man divorces Ho Sang and marries Lok Ping. Sau Hau reunites with Ho Sang and the two are seen still alive together in the year 2000.

== Cast ==
Tse Family

- Gam San as Tse Yang (Father)
- Yiu Chi Kwan as Yang Qiao (Mother)
- Amy Chan as Tse Sau Hau
- Phyllis Man as Tse Sau Ling (Sau Hau's 2nd sister)
- Annie Lee as Tse Sau Lai (adult)
- Chun Ka Wai as Tse Tin (adult)

Fong Family

- Paul Chun as Fong Sai Fan
- Nam Hung as Elder Mother (Ho Sang's mother, deceased due to illness. Fong Sai Fan's 1st wife)
- Bao Hei Jing as Yim Ha (Ho Man's mother, Fong Sai Fan's 2nd wife)
- Kiki Sheung as Shek Pui Pui (Fong Sai Fan's 3rd Wife)
- Steve Ma as Fong Ho Sang (Fong's eldest son with his first wife)
- Gilbert Lam as Fong Ho Man

Cheung Family

- Tam Bing Man as Man Fung's father
- Ng Yuen Yee as Man Fung's mother (also served as Fong Family as head of servant. Ho Sang's mother in-law.)
- Sheren Tang as Cheung Man Fung (Ho Sang's 2nd wife, later divorced and marries Wai Sai Bong)

Other cast

- Vincent Lam as Wai Sai Bong
- Lee Heung Kam as Kam Fung Chi (Sai Bong's mother)
- Maggie Siu as Ding Man (Ho Sang's 3rd wife, later separated with him and married with Lok Ping, Ho Sang's friend during his military tour of duty)
- Wong Chong Kwan as Lok Ping
- Renee Dai as Fong Hiu Wah, Man Fung's daughter (teenager)
- Wong Wan Choi as Dr. Ling
- Wong Oi Yiu as Fong Hiu Wah, Man Fung's daughter (adult)
- Michael Huang as Lo Ping

== Production ==
Filming took place in the district of Doumen in Zhuhai.

== Release ==
The drama consisted of 105 episodes and was broadcast every Monday to Friday at 10 to 11 pm from 15 April 1996 to 20 September 1996 on ATV. The series was rebroadcast in 2007 and 2014 on the network. Broadcasting rights were sold to TVB in 2015.

EBC purchased the broadcasting rights for Taiwan and was broadcast on the network in 1997.
