= Eternity: A Chinese Ghost Story =

- Genre: Period drama Mythology
- Based on: Story by Pu Songling
- Directed by: Yang Teng-kuei
- Starring: Barbie Hsu; Daniel Chan; Jessica Hsuan; Jacky Wu
- Opening theme: 倩女幽魂 by Daniel Chan
- Countries of origin: China; Taiwan
- Original language: Chinese
- No. of episodes: 40

Production
- Running time: approx. 45 minutes

Original release
- Network: CTS (Taiwan); Channel U (Singapore)
- Release: 2003 – 2003

Eternity: A Chinese Ghost Story (倩女幽魂) is a Chinese period drama series produced by Taiwanese station CTS in collaboration with several other countries. It is loosely based on several famous folktales such as the love story of Nie Xiaoqian and Ning Caicheng from Pu Songling's novel Strange Stories from a Chinese Studio (聊斋志异), the legend of Gan Jiang and Mo Ye and others. The cast consists of actors from China, Hong Kong, Taiwan, Malaysia and Singapore.

== Plot synopsis ==
In the empire of Tang, a Taoist sect called Xuan-Xin Zhen-Zong discovered an ancient stone tablet in a mountain cave. The tablet contained prophecies about the Estranged Couple of Seven Lifetimes, with the demon sect Moon Kingdom seeking to exploit their power. Jin Guang, the Grand Priest of Tang, and his elders Yan Chi Xia and Sima San-Niang protected the newborn babies of the couple, but Moon Kingdom managed to seize the baby girl. Yan Chi Xia and Sima San-Niang fought back, allowing the mother to escape with the baby boy.

Eighteen years later, scholar Ning Cai Cheng sold imitation paintings to support his mother's medical treatment. At Ruolan Temple, he encountered Nie Xiao-Qian, the baby girl who had been taken by Moon Kingdom. Nie Xiao-Qian, transformed into a fox spirit, sought true love among mortals. She encountered Mei Ji, a spider demon, who used her for demonic purposes. Nie Xiao-Qian attempted to make Ning Cai Cheng fall in love with her, but he discovered her true identity and fled.

Zhuge Liu-Yun, a disciple of Yan Chi Xia, rescued Ning Cai Cheng and learned of Nie Xiao-Qian's quest for genuine love. Sima Hong-Ye, daughter of Yan Chi Xia and Sima San-Niang, encountered Nie Xiao-Qian and initially wanted to destroy her. However, they discovered they belonged to the same sect. Zhuge Liu-Yun and Sima Hong-Ye had conflicting feelings for each other but held the key to resisting the demon realm.

A battle ensued, resulting in Yan Chi Xia's injury and the death of Qi Ye. Xiao Qian died in Ning Cai Cheng's arms. Twenty years later, Liu Yun encountered Ning Cai Cheng at a market. There he saw two girls who resembled Xiao Qian and Hong Ye. Upon closer examination he discovered it was not them. Still, when the two girls found a painting of Xiao Qian and Hong Ye it brought great joy to Ning Cai Cheng and Liu Yun.

== Cast ==
- Barbie Hsu as Nie Xiao Qian
- Daniel Chan as Ning Cai Cheng
- Nie Yuan as Mo Jun Qi Ye
- Jessica Hsuan as Si Ma Hong Ye/ Hung Yip
- Kimi Hsia as Xia Xiao Xue
- Jacky Wu as Zhuge Liu Yun
- Bernard Tan as Jing Wu Yuan
- Shen Xiao Hai as Jin Guang
- Tien Niu as Sim San Niang
- Yuhaojie Zheng as Xiao Wu Wei
- Yuen Wah as Yan Chi Xia
- Hao Zheng as Childhood Zhuge Liu Yun
- Zhu Yan as Empress Yin Yue / Tree Demon
- Teresa Mak as Mei Ji / Spider Demon
- Bryan Wong as Zhuge Wu Wei
- Sheren Tang as Su Tian Xin
- Pan Jie as Mrs. Ning
- Yuhaojie Zheng as Xiao Wu Wei
- Hang Cheuk Fan as Shangguan Yuan Hang
- Chen Zi Han as Shangguan Yu Er
- Yuen King-dan as Madam Ping
- Apple Hong as Ping An
- Jackie Lui as Zhu Ge Qing Tian
- Amy Chan as Lanmo/ Blue Demon
- Gabriel Harrison as Yi Xi
- Sang Ni as Mo Xie
- Victor Huang as Qian Jiang
- Gallen Lo as Mo Jun Liu Dao/ Six Demon

== Character descriptions ==
- Nie Xiao Qian (Barbie Hsu) - One of the 'star crossed lovers.' She is a talkative and kind fox spirit but she can also be very willful, and take things for granted. When she does not get her way, she throws tantrums.
- Ning Cai Chen (Daniel Chan) - He is one of the suspected 'star crossed lovers'.
- Qi Ye (Nie Yuan) - He is Yin Yue empire's young lord. He is also Cai Chen's twin brother, though he does not initially know this. Even before he knows his true identity, he wants humans not to suffer and tries to create a humane demon world. He looks very distant and cold but he has a warm heart.
- Zhu Ge Liu Yun (Wu Jing) - He is Yan's disciple and loves Hong Ye. He is talkative, playful and boastful.
- Zhu Ge Wu Wei (Bryan Wong) - He is Liu Yun's wise elder half-brother.
- Si Ma Hong Ye / Hung Yip (Jessica Hsuan) - She is Yan's daughter and inherits San Niang's fiery temper.
- Si Ma San Niang (Tien Niu) - Chi Xia's hot tempered wife. She is a skilled physician.
- Yan Chi Xia (Yuen Wah) - San Niang's husband and Hong Ye's father. He is the demon catcher who sacrifices himself in helping others.
- Xia Xiao Xue (Kimi Hsia) - She is Xiao Qian's close friend, a snow spirit also captured by Mei Ji. She is gentle and quiet.
- Jing Wu Yuan (Bernard Tan) - He is Lanmo's elder brother. He looks evil but he isn't.
- Jin Guang (Shen Xiao Hai) - He is the ruthless ruler of the Xuan Xin sect.
- Empress Yin Yue / Tree Demon (Zhu Yan) - She is Six demon's wife and is a tree demon.
- Mei Ji / Spider Demon (Teresa Mak) - An evil spider spirit which controls Xiao Qian in the beginning.
- Su Tian Xin (Sheren Tang) - She is Mo Xie's cousin and Gan Jiang's ex-love interest. She has magical powers and witnesses her 3 friends' deaths on the same day.
- Mrs. Ning (Pan Jie) - She wants a peaceful life and suffers from amnesia. She is very forgetful but sometimes can remember important details.
- Shangguan Yuan Hang (Hang Cheuk Fan) - He is Jin Guang's nephew and is a kind general who is dying of sickness.
- Shangguan Yu Er (Chen Zihan) - She is Jin Guang's niece and Yuan Hang's wicked sister. She is willing to do anything to make her dying brother happy.
- Madam Ping (Yuen King-dan) - Ping An's mother, very exaggerated.
- Ping An (Apple Hong) - She is a very confident village girl.
- Zhu Ge Qing Tian (Jackie Lui) - He is Yan's junior who falls for Lanmo when he goes undercover in Yin Yue sect.
- Lanmo / Blue Demon (Amy Chan) - She is Liu Yun's mother, and has blue eyes.
- Yi Xi (Gabriel Harrison) - He is a despicable man who poisons his senior, Gan Jiang in order to get to his junior, Mo Xie.
- Mo Xie (Sang Ni) - Xiao Qian's previous lifetime. She is deeply in love with Gan Jiang.
- Gan Jiang (Victor Huang) - Qi Ye's previous lifetime.
- Jun Liu Dao / Six Demon (Gallen Lo) - Empress Yin Yue's husband.

== Trivia ==
- This is Barbie Shu's first appearance as a solo actress following the series Meteor Garden and its sequel Meteor Garden II.
