= Sheren Tang =

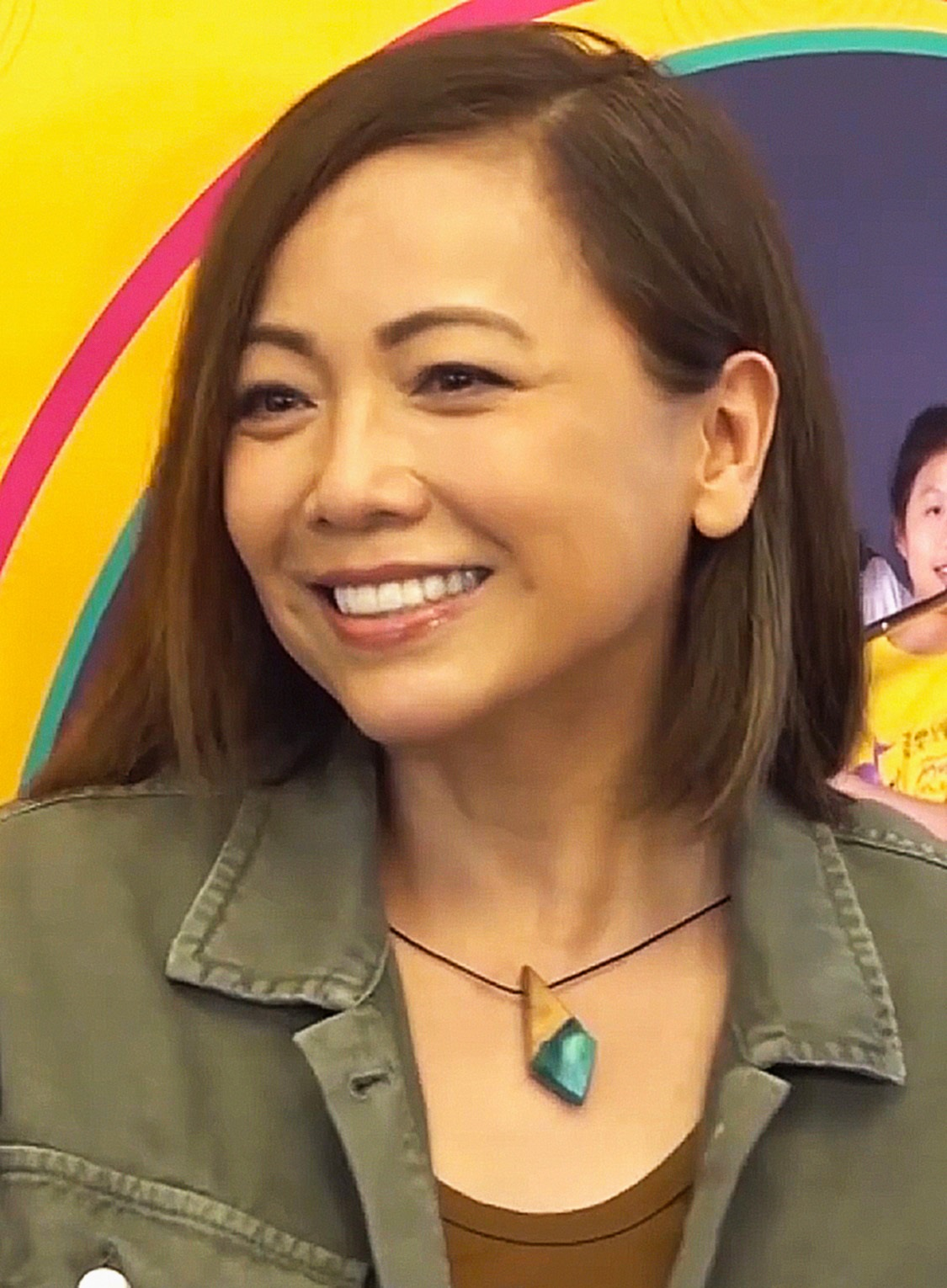
- Tang at children's charity event "Music Stand By Me" in Hong Kong, September 2019
- Born: Tang Shui Man; 2 March 1966 (age 60); Hong Kong
- Years active: 1985–present
- Awards: Ming Pao Anniversary Awards; Best Actress in Television; 2004 War and Beauty; 2009 Rosy Business; 2011 No Regrets TVB Anniversary Awards; Best Actress; 2009 Rosy Business; 2010 No Regrets; My Favourite Powerhouse Actress; 2003 The Threat of Love II; 2004 War and Beauty Huading Awards; Best Supporting Actress; 2011 New My Fair Princess

Chinese name
- Traditional Chinese: 鄧萃雯
- Simplified Chinese: 邓萃雯
Transcriptions
Standard Mandarin
- Hanyu Pinyin: Dèng Cuìwén
Yue: Cantonese
- Jyutping: Dang^{6} Seoi^{6} Man^{4}
- Musical career
- Also known as: Man Girl (雯女)

Sheren Tang Shui-man (Chinese: 鄧萃雯; born 2 March 1966) is a Hong Kong actress. She is best known for her roles in the Hong Kong TVB drama series War and Beauty, as well as La Femme Desperado, The Family Link, Rosy Business, and No Regrets, being the first Hong Kong actress to win the Best Actress Award in two consecutive years for the latter two.

She joined TVB in 1985, beginning her acting career as the female lead in the series Legend of the General Who Never Was (1985). Throughout the late 1980s, she rose to fame for her roles in many popular Hong Kong television series including wuxia dramas, New Heavenly Sword and Dragon Sabre (1986) and Ode to Gallantry (1989). She joined the television network ATV in 1996, filming several series including The Good Old Days (1996) and I Have A Date With Spring (1996).

Tang returned to TVB in 2000 and gained massive popularity for her role in War and Beauty (2004). She became the first actress to win TVB's My Favourite Powerhouse Actress Award two years in a row for this role and for The Threat of Love 2 (2003). Tang continued to outdo herself with her roles in Rosy Business (2009) and No Regrets (2010), which won her multiple awards in various countries. She has since appeared in Chinese series including New My Fair Princess (2011) and Star April (2017) before returning to Hong Kong television in 2018, filming a series for ViuTV released as Till Death Do Us Part (2019).

== Early life and education ==
Tang was born in 1966; her mother was 17 at the time. She was left with her paternal grandparents as a baby and her parents divorced when she was 5 years old. She has one paternal half-sister. Her ancestral hometown is Nanhai, Guangdong. Tang attended Heep Yunn School from primary to high school. She rarely saw her parents when she was growing up and credited her conversion to Christianity in 2005 in mending the estranged relationship between them later in her adulthood. She was later made president of the Hong Kong Artistes Christian Fellowship where many Hong Kong artistes including her co-stars are also members.

In 1984, with a nomination from Andy Lau, Tang joined TVB's 13th training course, which was the first year TVB reduced the course from one year to half a year, splitting the course into two semesters. Tang was in the second semester along with Kitty Lai, Aaron Kwok, Maggie Shiu, and Michael Tse. Both her paternal grandparents passed within a couple years after she joined TVB training classes, with her grandfather dying before her first drama had been broadcast.

In 1991, she went to the United States on a student visa to study interior design while continuing to film for TVB during her study breaks. During this time, she considered quitting the acting industry and moving to the United States permanently. However, when she returned in 1994, she ultimately decided to stay in Hong Kong and continue acting, as there were more interesting roles for women being offered at the time.

== Career ==
=== 1985–1995: Rise to fame at TVB ===
Tang joined TVB's 13th training class. After her graduation in 1985, having only done a few commercials, Tang was cast in her first role as female lead in The Legend of the General Who Never Was replacing original lead Maggie Cheung who was asked to take over Barbara Yung's remaining scenes in Battlefield, and King of Ideas (桥王之王) a.k.a. The Feud That Never Was (拆档拍档) soon after Yung's death. Tang would go on to play first or second leading roles in the first few years of her career, sometimes touted as Barbara Yung successor due to Tang's comparable beauty, and look.

Tang was cast in comedy series Happy Spirit where she acted alongside Carol Cheng as her younger sister. She starred as Chow chi-yeuk in New Heavenly Sword and Dragon Sabre, the 1986 adaptation of The Heaven Sword and Dragon Saber novel. She played Ching Yuet Yue in Police Cadet 1988, the second sequel to the widely popular Police Cadet series.

In 1989, she was featured in five series, three of which she starred alongside Roger Kwok; The Vixen’s Tale, I Do I Do, and The War Heroes. That same year she was cast in Ode to Gallantry, a Wuxia comedy based on the famous novel, where she starred as the character Ding Dong, reuniting with Police Cadet and New Heavenly Sword and Dragon Sabre costar Tony Leung. In 1990, she was cast as Fong Hei Tung in the series Friends and Lovers alongside Teresa Mo. Tang had let producers know that she was interested in working with Mo if given the opportunity prior to her casting and has stated that she is extremely grateful to have been cast in the series.

Her first supporting role was in the 1994 series The Intangible Truth where she starred as the sister to Roger Kwok’s character. The role was originally a guest role but subsequently became a significant character for the first half of the series. That same year, Tang played Tong Man Yung, best friend to Amy Chan’s character in popular series at the time, Fate of the Clairvoyant and starred as Kam Yik Lin in the comedy Filthy Rich.

In 1995, Tang played Joyce Yan, a forensic pathologist in File of Justice IV, the fourth installment of the popular File of Justice series She also starred as ICAC officer Poon Wai Yan in the female-led drama Corruption Doesn't Pay, alongside Esther Kwan and Kiki Sheung.

=== 1996–1999: Move to ATV ===
In 1996, Tang signed a one-year contract with ATV, filming over 200 episodes in a span of one to two years. She starred in the 1996 adaptation of I Have A Date With Spring as Yiu Siu Deep. While the drama did not attract many viewers in Hong Kong, it was a huge success in mainland China and the series has acquired a cult following. The role is considered one of her earlier representative works in China and Tang has continued to appear on dozens of variety programs and award shows performing songs from the series. She also reunited with costars Amy Chan, Kiki Sheung, and Maggie Shiu in one of the few popular ATV series The Good Old Days. She was also in the drama Interpol released in 1997. When her contract with ATV ended, she went on to act in several Taiwanese drama series. In 1998, she also appeared in Liang Po Po: The Movie as a foreign talent from Hong Kong that is engaged as an expert to impart knowledge of the triad to local gangsters like Liang Po Po. In 1999, Tang played a supporting role in the widely popular film Fly Me to Polaris.

=== 2000–2008: Return to TVB and War and Beauty Popularity ===
In 2000, she returned to TVB and starred in the weekend drama series The Threat of Love, which featured a new plot every episode. It grew to be popular among audiences, particularly for a weekend drama and was praised for its unique and progressive storylines. A sequel was released in 2003.

In 2001, Tang starred as a film director, Koi Ying-Jing in Screen Play and as Koo Yiu in the period drama Country Spirit. She went on to play supporting roles in the 2002 drama Good Against Evil and 2003 teen drama Aqua Heroes. Tang appeared as Su Tian Xin in the 2003 Taiwanese series Eternity: A Chinese Ghost Story which featured a large cast from mainland China, Taiwan and Hong Kong.

In 2003, she won the My Favourite Powerhouse Actress Award (renamed Best Supporting Actress Award in 2005) at the TVB Anniversary Awards for the various roles she played in The Threat of Love 2. In 2004, she repeated her win for this award and also won one of the Favourite Television Character Awards for her role in War and Beauty.

Her acting in War and Beauty as Yu Fei (如妃), an initially favoured consort who eventually falls from power, was critically acclaimed, making her a hot favourite for the "Best Actress" award in 2004. However, she did not win, with the award being given to Gigi Lai instead. Voting was closed the night before the awards ceremony, with Tang leading by a landslide; thus many people concluded that the "Best Actress" award would surely go to her. Tang, instead, went home with the My Favourite Powerhouse Actress Award (now renamed as Best Supporting Actress award). This attracted a lot of public backlash, which prompted the ICAC to conduct investigations into the award show. Her loss is considered and remembered as one of the biggest snubs in the awards show history. Tang said that although she felt a tiny bit of disappointment at the time due to the abundance of support and stated "anyone can get affected by people's words", she also said that she performed her best which audiences recognized and that is already enough for her, comparing an award to a dessert, something that is extra.

She expanded her career to mainland China in 2005 starring in two series. In the same year, Tang starred as So Sam in the costume drama The Prince’s Shadow and was also in the suspense film Slim Till Dead. She made an appearance in a flashback scene as the mother of Dragon played by Donnie Yen in the Hong Kong film Dragon Tiger Gate in 2006.

In 2006, Tang starred as a tough marketing CEO Hilda Hoi, in La Femme Desperado, which ranked number 1 in Hong Kong viewership ratings that year and won the Best Drama Award at the TVB Anniversary Awards. Tang was also nominated in the Best Actress Top 5 category and the My Favourite Female Television Role Top 5 category. In 2007, Tang went on to star in The Family Link where she was once again nominated in the Best Actress Top 5 category. The drama was ranked number 1 in average Hong Kong viewership ratings that year and was nominated for Best Drama at the TVB Anniversary Awards in 2007. That same year she also played a role in The Drive of Life, a TVB and CCTV joint grand production.

She starred as Kelly Yim in Your Class or Mine in 2008, reuniting with her File of Justice and Screenplay costar, Bobby Au Yeung. That same year, in addition to Rosy Business, Tang also filmed two Chinese series.

=== 2009–2015: Rosy Business, No Regrets and Success in China ===
In 2009, Tang's role as the 4th Wife (四奶奶) of a rice business owner in Rosy Business brought her much popularity, making her a hot favourite for the "Best Actress" award once again. However, it was said that TVB pushed back the award show to December so that grand production dramas Born Rich and Beyond the Realm of Conscience could be included in the nominations, diminishing Tang's chance of winning the award again. It was rumoured that TVB had initially wanted to promote female lead of Beyond the Realm of Conscience, Tavia Yeung, to become the Best Actress since Tang was not under a permanent contract with the network. However, Yeung openly said that if Tang did not get the "Best Actress" award, she would join the rest of the netizens to protest against TVB's decision. Fortunately, this time round, with TVB producer Catherine Tsang backing her, Tang was duly awarded her "Best Actress" award, much to the joy of Hong Kong citizens, whereby there was a petition signed by them for TVB to award Tang her long-overdue "Best Actress" award, failing which they will hold protests outside TVB City, the network's headquarters.

At the 2010 TVB Anniversary Awards, Tang was awarded for the "Best Actress" due to her role as Cheng Kau-mui in No Regrets. Tang has stated that her roles from Rosy Business and No Regrets are her favourite among all the characters she has played.

Already notable from War and Beauty and other TVB drama series, Tang and her co-star Wayne Lai gained even more popularity in Hong Kong, mainland China, Taiwan, and Cantonese-speaking Asian communities overseas after the release of both hit series Rosy Business and No Regrets. They have continued to work together occasionally for charity, public events, and variety shows over the years.

In 2011, she starred as the empress in the mainland China series New My Fair Princess, a remake of the 1998 hit series My Fair Princess. This role won her a Huading Award for Best Supporting Actress in 2011. Her involvement in the series prevented her from taking a similar role in Chinese hit series Empresses in the Palace. The role went to co-star and friend Ada Choi, who was originally supposed to play Tang's character in War and Beauty. Tang calls their "character swap" fantastic and fate. Tang also clarified that she was only asked to join this series, and stated rumors of her rejecting a role in another hit series Story of Yanxi Palace were false, since she was never asked to join that series.

From 2012 to 2014, she also played a supporting role as Aunt Poise in The Four film trilogy where she reunited with 2005 suspense film Slim Till Dead costar and friend Anthony Wong.

In 2012, Tang starred as Bai Yuqin in the historical drama Allure Snow. In 2013, she starred in Love Is Not For Sale as the executive of a supermarket chain. Her contract expired with TVB after filming for the indirect sequel of War and Beauty, Beauty at War in 2012.

In 2014, she starred in the costume comedy Cosmetology High playing historical figure, Wu Zetian, the only empress regnant (female emperor) of China.

Tang took approximately two years off from acting in 2014 and 2015 to focus on her health after being diagnosed with dysautonomia and minor thyroid problems. She has since made a full recovery.

=== 2016–present: Return to Hong Kong television and New Management ===
After a short hiatus, Tang appeared in the film Heartfall Arises in 2016; and was cast in Star April, and Once Given Never Forgotten in 2017. Tang also joined Wong Cho Lam's Tailor Made Productions Limited for a year.

Sources had reported that Tang was asked to return to TVB for several dramas since 2015 after her contract ended in 2012 which included My Unfair Lady and Wonder Women, as the network tried to revamp after a couple years of low viewership and a hefty number of artistes and employees leaving. She instead made an appearance as a presenter at the TVB Anniversary Awards in 2016 and appeared on a couple of the network's talk show programmes in 2017.

In 2018, Tang returned to Hong Kong television in Till Death Do Us Part with broadcaster ViuTV. In the drama, Tang joins former TVB cast mates Sunny Chan and Bernice Liu.

In 2021, Tang confirmed on Weibo that she has signed with Chinese management company Haohan Entertainment, with the company confirming she is part of the main cast in Chinese drama Women Walk The Line.

Tang stated over recent years that she tries to be mindful of health first, afraid of overworking herself again, and would like to read at least a partial script before taking a new role. At the 2016 TVB Anniversary Awards, she joked that she cannot handle fei tze jai (a small piece of paper) the term used to describe writers writing the next lines on small pieces of paper for the cast while shooting on location due to unfinished scripts. In addition, Tang says she only wants roles that will positively affect people's lives, and that she is taken more seriously, and professionally, as an actress in China than in Hong Kong.

In September 2023, Tang revealed she had declined to take part in the fourth installment of Rosy Business No Return. Explaining her decision, she cited an unhappy past filming experience and no longer compromising on unprofessional practices in the industry. She clarified that the decision was unrelated to money after tabloids sparked rumours that TVB could not afford her due to her popularity in mainland China after the success of No More Bets and that her decision was made prior to the film's release.

Since May 2024, Tang plays the leading female role Shou Ma in the Chinese theatre play Crocodile, written and produced by novelist and playwright Mo Yan, who was awarded the 2012 Nobel Prize in Literature. This is Tang's first theatre role. Crocodile is currently on tour, and has played at various venues across Suzhou, Guangzhou, and Ningbo.

== Filmography ==
=== TVB series ===
Year	Title	Role	Notes
1985	The Legend of the General Who Never Was	Lau Kam-fa	Television Debut
1985	The Possessed	Dyun Muk-Hung	
1985	Happy Spirit	Yeung Hoi-yee	
1986	New Heavenly Sword and Dragon Sabre	Chow Chi-Yeuk	
1986	Brothers Under the Skin	Ling Choi-yuet	
1986	The Legend of Wong Tai Sin	Gu Sou-sou	
1987	The Greenhorns	Guk Siu-nga	
1987	Police Cadet 1988	Ching Yuet Yue	
1988	The In-Between	Kong Ka-Yiu	
1988	Everybody's Somebody's Favourite	Clara	Episodes 110–122
1988	The Vendetta	Ting Hiu-Kwun	
1988	Twilight of a Nation	Hon Bo-Ying	
1989	The Vixen's Tale	Koo Yuet/Wu Chin Chin/Choi Cha	
1989	The Sword and the Sabre	Lang Yuet	
1989	I Do, I Do	Lily	
1989	The War Heros	Tung Heung-Yee	
1989	Ode to Gallantry	Ding Dong	
1990	The Enforcer's Experience	Ching Hoi-Ka	
1990	Friends and Lovers	Fong Hei-tung (Yolanda)	
1991	On the Edge	Wong Kwun-yin (Alice)	
1992	Once Upon a Time in Hong Kong	Pang Hung	
1993	The Conspiracy of The Eunuch	Fan Tai	
1994	The Intangible Truth	Ma Kit	
1994	Fate of the Clairvoyant	Tong Mun-Yung	
1994	Filthy Rich	Kam Yik-Lin	
1995	Corruption Doesn't Pay	Poon Wai-yan	
1995	File of Justice IV	Yan Tze-kit (Joyce)	
2000	The Threat of Love	Ching Ka Si/Wong Hung/Mak Mei Ying/Miu Hok Wai/Choi Lei Yuk/Lee Sau Mei/Yip Miu-yu/Fong Yiu/Ho Lei Fun/Yeung Siu Nam	Various Roles
2000	Healing Hands II	Tsui Ka-wing	Guest Star (4 Episodes)
2001	Screen Play	Koi Ying-jing	
2001	Country Spirit	Koo Yiu	
2002	Good Against Evil	Lau Siu-po	
2003	The Threat of Love II	Cheung Fan/Jessie/Ting Yuet Ying/Hui Ha/Sam/Chu Sau Ping/Mei/So Yuk Kwan/Fong Yi Lei/Karen	Various Roles
2003	Aqua Heroes	Sui Kin Yee (Sandy)	
2004	War and Beauty	Niu-hu-lu Ru-yue	
2005	The Prince's Shadow	So Sam	
2006	La Femme Desperado	Hoi Kiu (Hilda)	
2007	The Family Link	Mung Ka-Ka (Monica)	
2007	The Drive of Life	Wang Siu-Fun (Fanny)	
2008	Your Class or Mine	Yim Ka-Lai (Kelly)	
2009	Rosy Business	Hong Po-Kei	
2010	No Regrets	Cheng Kau-Mui	
2013	Beauty at War	Niu-hu-lu Ru-yue	

=== ATV series ===
Year	Title	Role
1996	I Have a Date with Spring	Yiu Siu-deep
1996	The Good Old Days	Cheung Man-fung/Chung Sum-ming
1997	Interpol	Law Tze-yin

=== Other series ===
Year	English title	Chinese title	Role	Original Network	Notes/Ref.
1997		施公奇案之辣筆老辛	Sang Xiaohuan	CTS	Taiwanese Drama Series
1997		施公奇案之母親阿霞	Ah Xia	CTS	Taiwanese Drama Series
2001		少年英雄之洪文定	Se Yi Niang	ATV	Taiwanese Drama Series
2003	Eternity: A Chinese Ghost Story	倩女幽魂	Su Tian Xin	CTS	Taiwanese Drama Series
2005	Huiniang Wanxin	徽娘宛心	Xiao Guixiang	SMG Shanghai TV	
2005	Love of Fate	青城之戀	Mei Lan	JSBC	
2008		牌坊下的女人	He Qizhen	Jinan TV	
2009	Rose Martial World	玫瑰江湖	Yin Xuehan	GDTV	
2011	New My Fair Princess	新還珠格格	Empress	Hunan Television	
2012	Allure Snow	傾城雪	Bai Yu-qin	Henan TV	
2013	Love is Not For Sale	棋逢對手	Su Shan Na (Susanna)	Huace TV	
2014	Cosmetology High	美人製造	Wu Zetian	HBS	
2017	Star April	繁星四月	Cui Fengping	JSBC	
2019	Till Death Do Us Part	婚內情	Ma Suk-Sheung (Sharon)	ViuTV	Hong Kong Drama Series
2020	My Unicorn Girl	穿盔甲的少女	Cheng Min Li	iQIYI	Special Guest Star (7 episodes)
2021	Once Given, Never Forgotten	你的名字我的姓氏	Jiang Peishan (Paisley)	iQIYI, Tencent	
2022	Women Walk The Line	我们的当打之年	Fu Mei	Tencent, iQIYI	
2023	Faithful	九义人	Madam Ning	Tencent	
TBA		爱在风起云涌时	Fu Yuxia		Filmed in 2013 Post-production as of 2020
TBA	The Emperor's Love	倾城亦清欢	Madam Butterfly	iQIYI	Post-production

=== Film ===
Year	Title	Chinese title	Role	Notes
1989	Guilty Feeling	逼娼為良	Susie	TVB Film
1989	The Yuppie Fantasia	小男人週記	Cora	
1989	Club Girls	火舞儷人	Lai Man	
1990		夢殺	Sung Suk Man	TVB Film
1990	The Big Score	絶橋智多星	Ling	
1990	The Legend of Fairies	九天玄女 / 蛊咒传奇	Siu Yuk	
1990	Out of Bravery	天涯路客	Yan So Mei	TVB Film
1991	Au Revoir, Mon Amour	何日君再来		Cameo
1992	The Son of Dragon	龍之根	Cho Yee	
1995	Chase For Glory	江湖梦	Wan Yuen Lan	TVB Film
1999	Fly Me to Polaris	星愿	Autumn's Sister	
1999	Liang Po Po: The Movie	梁婆婆重出江湖	Mun Jie	
2000	Eternal Love	没有你，没有我	Shirley	
2003	Double Crossing	親密殺機	Man Sa-Wah (Sabrina)	Television Film (TVB)
2004	When Beckham Met Owen	當碧咸遇上奧雲	Michael's mother	
2004	The Quick Step of Passion	紅杏劫	Sum Ka-Bo (Cheerie)	Television Film (TVB)
2005	Slim till Dead	瘦身	Ling	
2006	Without Words	地老天荒	Hong's mother	
2006	Dragon Tiger Gate	龍虎門	Dragon's mother	Cameo
2012	The Four	四大名捕	Aunt Poise	
2013	The Four II	四大名捕II	Aunt Poise	
2014	The Four III	四大名捕III	Aunt Poise	
2016	Heartfall Arises	驚心破	Che's wife	
2023	No More Bets	孤注一掷	Tian's mother	

=== Music video appearances ===
Year	Title	Chinese title	Artist	Notes
1985	"Love in Fever"	"愛到發燒"	George Lam	
1986	"Di Yi Di Lei"	"第一滴淚"	Alan Tam	

=== Variety & reality programs ===
Year	English title	Chinese title	Network	Notes/Ref.
1985	TVB 18th Anniversary Gala	萬千星輝賀台慶	TVB	Performer
1986		群星獻瑞喜迎春	TVB	
1986	Miss TV semi-finals	1986年電視小姐競選準決賽	TVB	
1987		翡翠群星二十年	TVB	
1988	TVB 21st Anniversary Gala	萬千星輝賀台慶	TVB	Performer
1988		1988銀河接力大賽	TVB	
1988		星光閃聚吉隆坡	TVB	
1988		連環泡	CTS	
1989		周末夜遊人	TVB	
1990		電視先鋒群星會	TVB	
1994		愛情公開學院	TVB	
1995		花弗新世界	TVB	
1995		運財智叻星	TVB	
1995		寰宇風情	TVB	Host with Gordon Lam Episodes: Peru, Brazil (Amazon)
1999		蔡瀾嘆世界	TVB	Episode: South Africa
1999		公益金屋開心SHOW	TVB	
1999		反斗旅游俱樂部IV	TVB	
1999	Super Trio Series (Series 4)	驚天動地獎門人	TVB	
1999	Taiwan Homerun	台灣紅不讓	TTV	
1999		2000小時迎千禧之光輝紀元出狀元	TVB	
2000	Super Trio Series (Series 5)	宇宙無敵獎門人	TVB	
2001		名人蒲點食名菜	TVB	Guest Host Episodes: Taiwan, Shanghai
2001		旅遊真的感受	TVB	Host Episodes: Korea
2001	Weakest Link	一筆out消	TVB	
2001		公益開心大富翁	TVB	
2002		旅遊真程趣III	TVB	Episodes: Korea
2002	Mission Reality	大學群英越野狂奔	TVB	Host with Kevin Cheng
2002		一觸即發	TVB	
2003	TVB 36th Anniversary Gala	萬千星輝賀台慶	TVB	Nominee/Recipient
2004		峇里加倍開心之旅	TVB	Host
2004		旅創新感受	TVB	
2004		翡翠實力派	TVB	
2004	Pleasure & Leisure	都市閒情	TVB	
2004	Super Trio Series (Series 7)	繼續無敵獎門人	TVB	
2004	TVB 37th Anniversary Gala	萬千星輝賀台慶	TVB	Nominee/Recipient
2004	TVB8 Mandarin Music On Demand Awards Presentation	TVB8金曲榜頒獎典禮	TVB	Presenter
2005	Hong Kong Film Awards	香港電影金像獎	RTHK	Presenter for "Best Supporting Actress"
2005	Adam Cheng Concert Special	鄭少秋家傳户曉演唱會		Guest
2006	Queen	女人我最大	TVBS	
2006		15/16	TVB	
2006		心大心細	TVB	
2006		星級育樂王	TVB	
2006	TVB Awards Presentation	萬千星輝頒獎典禮	TVB	Nominee
2007	Is That Right?	問題娛樂圈	TVB	
2007	Deal Or No Deal	一擲千金	TVB	
2007	TVB Awards Presentation	萬千星輝頒獎典禮	TVB	Nominee
2008	TVB 41st Light Switching Ceremony	無綫電視台慶亮燈儀式	TVB	
2009	Artistes 512 Fundraising Campaign	TVB512再展關懷	TVB	
2009	Community Chest Charity Show	萬眾同心公益金	TVB	
2009	Starry Kitchen	星級廚房	TVB	4 episodes
2009	Be My Guest	志雲飯局	TVB	
2009	Club Sparkle	星星同學會	TVB	
2009	The Green Room	今日VIP	TVB	Episodes: #69 (May 7), #223 (December 9)
2009	Beautiful Cooking (Series 2)	美女廚房	TVB	Episode: Cast of Rosy Business
2009	Club Venus	至8女人心	TVB	
2009	TVB 42nd Anniversary Gala	萬千星輝賀台慶	TVB	Performer
2009	TVB Awards Presentation	萬千星輝頒獎典禮	TVB	Nominee/Recipient
2009	TVB Sales Presentation 2010	2010無綫節目巡禮	TVB	
2010	TVB 43rd Light Switching Ceremony	無綫電視台慶亮燈儀式	TVB	
2010	TVB Awards Presentation	萬千星輝頒獎典禮	TVB	Nominee/Recipient
2010	Sammi Cheng's LoveMi Concert Special	鄭秀文LoveMi演唱會		Guest
2010	Andy Lau's Unforgettable Concert Special	劉德華Unforgettable演唱會		Guest
2010	Big Four Up	Big4大四喜	TVB	
2010	The Green Room	今日VIP	TVB	Episodes: #206 (October 18), #235 (November 26), #243 (December 8)
2011	The Green Room	今日VIP	TVB	Episode: #204 (October 18)
2011	Kitchen Diva Louisa	和味蘇	TVB	
2011	Happy Camp	快乐大本营	HBS	Episode: Cast of New My Fair Princess
2011	Nothing is Bigger Than Eat	吃飯皇帝大	TVBS	Guest with Wayne Lai
2011	Spring Festival Gala	2011年春節联歡晚會	Dragon Television	Performer
2011	MingPao 43rd Anniversary Awards	明報週刊演藝動力大獎		Nominee/Recipient
2011	TVB Awards Presentation	萬千星輝頒獎典禮	TVB	Presenter for "Best Actor"
2011	China TV Drama Awards	国剧盛典	Anhui TV	Recipient & Performer
2012	Tencent Video Awards	騰訊星光大典	Tencent	Recipient
2013	The Green Room	今日VIP	TVB	Episodes: #89 (May 9), #90 (May 10)
2013	China Fashion Awards	星尚大典	SMG	Recipient
2016	Run For Time (Season 2)	全員加速中	HBS, Mango TV	Episode 7
2016	Ace VS Ace	王牌對王牌	Zhejiang TV	Season 1, Episode 9
2016	The Jin Xing Show	金星秀	SMG	Episode 98
2016		我们在一起	Jiangsu TV	
2016		优酷全明星	Youku	Web series
2016	TVB Awards Presentation	萬千星輝頒獎典禮	TVB	Presenter for "Best Drama"
2017	SOBEM	恩雨之聲	TVB	
2017	Telling Maria (Series 4)	最佳拍檔	TVB	
2017	Crossover Singer	跨界歌王	BTV	
2019	China Literary and Art Circles Spring Festival Gala	百花迎春文藝新年晚會		Performer
2020	China Literary and Art Circles Spring Festival Gala	百花迎春文藝新年晚會		Performer
2020		流淌的歌声	Guangdong TV	
2020	Sing Or Spin (Season 2)	嗨唱转起来	HBS, Mango TV	
2021	Life Is Beautiful (Season 2)	让生活好看	HBS, Mango TV	
2021	Changchun Film Festival	长春电影节	CCTV-6	Presenter
2021		辣妈学院	Shenzhen TV, IQiyi	
2021	China Literary and Art Circles Spring Festival Gala	百花迎春文藝新年晚會		Performer
2021	OK! Magazine 9th Anniversary Awards	OK！精彩挚爱大赏	Tencent	Recipient
2022	China Literary and Art Circles Spring Festival Gala	百花迎春文藝新年晚會		Performer
2022	China TV Drama Awards	国剧盛典	Anhui TV	Performer/Presenter
2022	Night In The Greater Bay (Season 1)	大湾仔的夜	HBS, Mango TV	Episode 10 Special guest
2022	Hello, Saturday/Hi! 6 (Season 1)	你好，星期六	HBS, Mango TV	Episode 4: Greater Bay Area
2022	Duality Of Her	她的双重奏	Douyin	Episode 2 Web series
2022	Everlasting Classics (Season 5)	经典咏流传	CCTV-1	Performer (with Joey Meng)
2022		曜言派	Douyin	Episode 1
2022	Memories Beyond Horizon	无限超越班	Zhejiang TV, Youku, TVB	Guest Judge

== Discography ==
=== Soundtrack appearances ===
- I Have A Date With Spring (1995)

== Advertisements & endorsements ==
- 2009: La Prairie 泊妮化妆品
- 2009: OTO Bodycare OTO揼揼鬆
- 2010: Lion White Story Laundry Detergent 潔白物語洗衣粉（獅王潔白物語）
- 2010-2020: Meiriki Japan 日本命力強骼素
- 2010: Rohto Eye Moisturizer 樂敦養潤水
- 2010: Easy Dance 纖形22
- 2011: Blue Cross Insurance Hong Kong (with Wayne Lai) 藍十字保險
- 2012: Salon De Pro 染髮劑
- 2013: Noto Ginseng 樂道三七
- 2016–present: Rohto 50の惠 養潤育髮精華素
- 2020: SCHSA Medical Alarm Smartphone
- 2020: SCHSA Medical Alarm Smartwatch (with Helena Law)

== Accolades ==
=== Awards and nominations ===
Year	Award	Category	Work	Result	Ref.
2003	TVB Anniversary Awards	My Favourite Powerhouse Actress	The Threat of Love 2	Won	
2004	Yahoo Asia Buzz Awards	Most Popular Actress		Won	
2004	TVB Anniversary Awards	My Favourite Powerhouse Actress	War and Beauty	Won	
2004	TVB Anniversary Awards	My Favourite Television Character	War and Beauty	Won	
2004	TVB Anniversary Awards	Best Actress (Top 5)	War and Beauty	Nominated	
2004	Mingpao Awards	Best Actress	War and Beauty	Won	
2005	Astro TV Awards	My Top 12 Favourite Characters	War and Beauty	Won	
2005	Astro TV Awards	Most Unforgettable Scene	War and Beauty	Won	
2005	Next Magazine Awards	Top 10 Artistes (First Position)		Won	
2006	TVB Anniversary Awards	Best Actress (Top 5)	La Femme Desperado	Nominated	
2006	TVB Anniversary Awards	My Favourite Female Character (Top 5)	La Femme Desperado	Nominated	
2007	Astro TV Awards	My Top 12 Favourite Characters	La Femme Desperado	Won	
2007	Astro TV Awards	Most Unforgettable Scene	La Femme Desperado	Won	
2007	TVB Anniversary Awards	Best Actress (Top 5)	The Family Link	Nominated	
2007	TVB Anniversary Awards	My Favourite Female Character (Top 20)	The Family Link	Nominated	
2008	TVB Anniversary Awards	Best Actress (Top 10)	Your Class or Mine	Nominated	
2009	TVB Anniversary Awards	Best Actress	Rosy Business	Won	
2009	TVB Anniversary Awards	My Favourite Female Character (Top 5)	Rosy Business	Nominated	
2009	Mingpao Awards	Best Actress	Rosy Business	Won	
2009	Tencent All Star Awards	TV Actress of the Year (Hong Kong/Taiwan)	Rosy Business	Won	
2009	Yahoo Asia Buzz Awards	Most Popular Actress		Won	
2010	Next Magazine Awards	Top 10 Artistes (First Position)		Won	
2010	TVB Anniversary Awards	Best Actress	No Regrets	Won	
2010	TVB Anniversary Awards	My Favourite Female Character (Top 5)	No Regrets	Nominated	
2010	My AOD Favourites Awards	My Favourite TVB Drama Character	No Regrets	Won	
2010	My AOD Favourites Awards	My Favourite Actress in a Leading Role	No Regrets	Nominated	
2011	Shanghai Television Festival	Best Actress	No Regrets	Nominated	
2011	Mingpao Awards	Best Actress	No Regrets	Won	
2011	StarHub TVB Awards	My Favourite TVB Character	No Regrets	Won	
2011	China TV Drama Awards	Most Popular Actress (Hong Kong/Taiwan)	No Regrets	Won	
2011	Next Magazine Awards	Top 10 Artistes (Third Position)		Won	
2011	Huading Awards	Best Supporting Actress	New My Fair Princess	Won	
2011	Tencent All Star Awards	TV Actress of the Year (Hong Kong/Taiwan)	New My Fair Princess	Won	
2015	Huading Awards	Best Supporting Actress	Cosmetology High	Nominated	

=== Other awards ===
- 1986 華僑晚報 Overseas Chinese Daily News - Top 10 TV Stars
- 2004 My Favourite TV Character (voted by artistes/War and Beauty)
- 2004 娱乐满天星 - Most Popular Actress
- 2004 娱乐满天星 - Most Popular Villain (War and Beauty)
- 2004 Metro Radio - Best Classic Character (Grand Prize)
- 2004 Metro Radio - Best Actress
- 2004 Radio Television Hong Kong - Most Outstanding Actress
- 2004 Sina.com (Hong Kong) - Top 10 Outstanding People (4th position)
- 2005 FarmX Teen Power B-Day Party - Most Popular TV Personality Prize
- 2006 南方盛典 Southern China Award Ceremony - Best Actress (Love of Fate)
- 2007 Metro Radio - Best Newsworthy TV Queen
- 2009 My Favourite TV Character (voted by artistes/Rosy Business)
- 2009 Best Actress (voted by artistes/Rosy Business)
- 2010 My Favourite TV Character (voted by artistes/No Regrets)
- 2010 Best Actress (voted by artistes/No Regrets)
- 2010 Eileen Cha's Netizens' Choice - Best Actress
- 2010 Meiriki Japan Most Powerful Star
- TVshow2010娛樂電視大獎 - My Favourite TV Female Character
- 2012 星尚大典 Best Film & Television Character
- 2012 Meiriki Japan Most Powerful Star
- 2013 卓展·Lady - Top 10 Female Characters with Positive Energy (Beauty At War)
- 2016 Meiriki Japan Most Powerful Star
- 2021 OK! Magazine Awards - OK! Yearly Favourite Actress
- 2021 iFeng 凤凰网 Fashion Choice - Tribute Actor of the Year
- 2021 Rayli 瑞丽网 - 2021-2022 Quality Actress
