= The Family Link =

- Poster
- 師奶兵團
- Genre: Modern Drama
- Starring: Sheren Tang; Cecilia Yip; Kiki Sheung; Michael Tse; David Chiang; Kenneth Ma; Leila Tong; Fala Chen; Derek Kwok; Wilson Tsui
- Country of origin: Hong Kong
- Original language: Cantonese
- No. of episodes: 21

Production
- Running time: 45 minutes (approx.)

Original release
- Network: TVB
- Release: May 14 – June 10, 2007

The Family Link (Traditional Chinese: 師奶兵團) is a TVB modern drama series broadcast in May 2007.

== Synopsis ==
Mung Ka-Ka (Sheren Tang), Cho Mei-Ngoh (Kiki Sheung), and Hilary Ding Mui-Hong (Cecilia Yip) are good friends and they are experts on how to raise a family. They teach Ko Wing-Kuen (David Chiang) how to raise his daughter and show him that it takes more than words to care for a child.

Along the way, they find out that their husbands might be secretly doing things behind their backs:

- Ka-Ka suspects her husband Joe Fong Yin-Jo (Michael Tse) is secretly pretending to be a woman, while in reality he is trying to pursue his goal of becoming a cross-dressing pop star.
- Mei-Ngoh's husband Ma Dai-Hap (Wilson Tsui) might be cheating on her with another woman.
- Mui-Hong thinks her husband Bill Cheuk Kam-Biu (Derek Kwok) might be having an affair in which causes her to receive sexual diseases.
- Shu Siu-Man (Leila Tong) just came back from America and suspects all three of them to have caused the death of her best friend Yoyo who is also Gam Shing-Tsun's (Kenneth Ma) wife.

== Cast ==
Cast	Role	Description
Sheren Tang	Mung Ka-Ka 蒙嘉嘉	Homemaker; Fong Yin-Jo's wife.
Michael Tse	Fong Yin-Jo (Joe) 方彥祖	Clerk; Mung Ka-Ka's husband.
Cecilia Yip	Ding Mui-Heung 丁梅香	Homemaker; Cheuk Kam-Biu's wife.
Derek Kwok	Cheuk Kam-Biu (Bill) 卓錦標	Manager; Ding Mui-Hong's husband.
Kiki Sheung (商天娥)	Cho Mei-Ngoh 曹美娥	Homemaker; Ma Dai-Hap's wife.
Wilson Tsui (艾威)	Ma Dai-Hap 馬大哈	Cho Mei-Ngo's husband.
Leila Tong	Shu Siu-Man 舒小曼	Ko Wing-Kuen's sister-in-law. Yoyo's best friend.
Kenneth Ma	Gam Shing-Tsun 甘誠俊	Cafe Owner; Yoyo's husband.
David Chiang	Ko Wing-Kuen 高永權	Shu Siu-Man's brother-in-law.
Fala Chen	Angela	Cheuk Kam-Biu's boss and lover.

== Viewership ratings ==
	Week	Episode	Average Points	Peaking Points	References
1	May 14–18, 2007	1 — 5	31	33	
2	May 21–25, 2007	6 — 10	32	34	
3	May 29 - June 1, 2007	11 — 15	31	40	
4	June 4–8, 2007	16 — 20	33	36	
4	June 10, 2007	21	38	42	

== Awards and nominations ==
40th TVB Anniversary Awards (2007)

- "Best Drama"
- "Best Actor in a Leading Role" (Michael Tse - Joe Fong Yin-Jo)
- "Best Actress in a Leading Role" (Sheren Tang - Mung Ka-Ka)
- "Best Actress in a Leading Role" (Kiki Sheung - Cho Mei-Ngoh)
- "Best Actor in a Supporting Role" (Kenneth Ma - Gam Sing-Tsun)
- "Best Actor in a Supporting Role" (Derek Kok - Bill Cheuk Kam-Biu)
- "Best Actor in a Supporting Role" (Wilson Tsui - Ma Dai-Hap)
- "Best Actress in a Supporting Role" (Leila Tong - Shu Siu-Man)
- "My Favourite Male Character" (Michael Tse - Joe Fong Yin-Jo)
- "My Favourite Male Character" (David Chiang - Ko Wing-Kuen)
- "My Favourite Female Character" (Sheren Tang - Mung Ka-Ka)
- "My Favourite Female Character" (Kiki Sheung - Cho Mei-Ngoh)
- "My Favourite Female Character" (Leila Tong - Shu Siu-Man)
