= Slim till Dead =

2005 Hong Kong film by Marco Mak

- Film poster
- Directed by: Marco Mak; Wong Jing
- Written by: Wong Jing
- Produced by: Wong Jing
- Starring: Anthony Wong; Cherrie Ying; Wong Jing
- Edited by: Chung Wai-Chiu; Ho Wai-Yip
- Distributed by: Mei Ah Entertainment
- Release date: 3 March 2005 (Hong Kong)
- Running time: 92 minutes
- Country: Hong Kong
- Language: Cantonese
- Box office: $408,398

Slim till Dead (Chinese: 瘦身) (Orig. Sul sun) is a 2005 Hong Kong film directed by Marco Mak and stars Anthony Wong and Cherrie Ying.

== Cast ==
- Anthony Wong
- Cherrie Ying
- Sheren Tang
- Raymond Wong Ho-yin
- Crystal Tin
- Zuki Lee
- Joyce Tang
- Wong Jing
- Jing Gangshan

== Reception ==
A reviewer for lovehkfilm.com wrote that the film was "Your standard Wong Jing hodgepodge", though they believed it "holds together enough to make it reasonably interesting, if not tasteful." Despite Slim till Dead's ambitions of being "a scathing look at Hong Kong's ubiquitous 'slimming craze'", the reviewer stated that the film's premise "isn't very original-sounding, [and] it could have added a layer of satirical subtext to an otherwise routine and messy exploitation thriller."
