= Bloodletting & Miraculous Cures =

2006 short story collection by Vincent Lam

- Author: Vincent Lam
- Language: English
- Genre: Literary fiction
- Publisher: Doubleday in Canada; Weinstein Books in the US
- Publication date: January 17, 2006
- Publication place: Canada
- ISBN: 978-0-385-66143-0 (Doubleday); ISBN 978-1-60286-000-1 (Weinstein Books)
- OCLC: 61258833

Bloodletting & Miraculous Cures is a short story collection by Vincent Lam, published in 2006. The book, inspired by Lam's own experiences in medical school and as a professional physician, is a volume of interconnected short stories about the lives and relationships of Fitzgerald, Ming, Chen and Sri, four young medical students in Toronto.

Bloodletting won the 2006 Scotiabank Giller Prize.

== Television adaptation ==
On November 10, 2006, Canadian production company Shaftesbury Films announced a deal with Lam to adapt the book into an eight-episode television series. According to TMN spokesperson Michelle Marion, "ER is a medical drama for conventional television. Bloodletting & Miraculous Cures is a medical drama for pay television."

The series went into production in 2009, and debuted in January 2010 on The Movie Network and Movie Central's multiplex service, HBO Canada. The show's cast includes Shawn Ashmore as Fitz, Mayko Nguyen as Ming, Keon Mohajeri as Sri, Byron Mann as Chen, and Terra Vnesa as Sienna. Jason Sherman wrote the teleplay. Guest stars include Tatiana Maslany, Zoie Palmer, Joe Cobden and William Ellis.

Season	Episode	Title	Original air date
1	1	"How to Get Ahead in Medical School"	10 January 2010
1	2	"The Missing Years"	17 January 2010
1	3	"Code Clock"	24 January 2010
1	4	"Family Practice"	31 January 2010
1	5	"Unhappy Endings"	7 February 2010
1	6	"All Souls"	14 February 2010
1	7	"Isolation"	21 February 2010
1	8	"Complications"	28 February 2010

=== International broadcasts ===
Country	Channel	Premiere date	Timeslot
Australia	Universal Channel	July 7, 2010	Wednesday 7:30pm
New Zealand	ChoiceTV	April 29, 2012	Sunday 8:30pm
