= Angela Pang =

Hong Kong singer (born 1969)

- 彭家麗
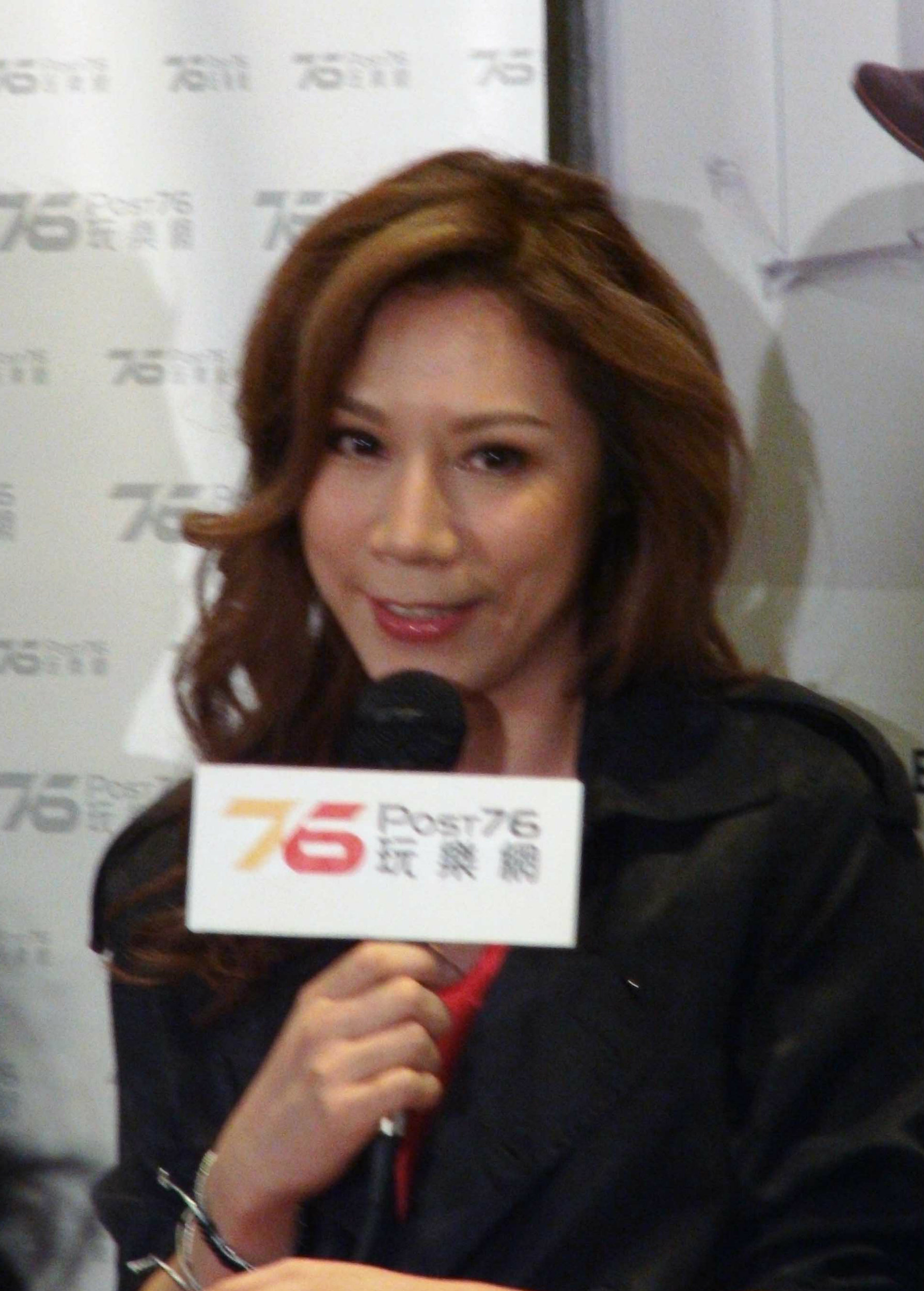
- Angela Pang in 2014
- Education: Fung Kai No.1 Secondary School

Angela Pang Ka-lai (Chinese: 彭家麗) is a Hong Kong female singer and singing instructor. Her younger brother is the artist Peter Pang Ho-fung. Before retiring from the music industry, she was an artiste of TVB. In 2012, she joined Hong Kong Television Network. In 2013, she returned to the music industry and signed with Sony Music Entertainment (Hong Kong) and TVB (2014).

== Early life ==
Angela Pang Ka-lai grew up in Hung Hom, Kowloon. She has an older sister and a younger brother, both of whom attended English primary schools.

== Career ==
In 1987, Pang accompanied her friends to participate in the CBS/Sony Asia Star Singing Competition hosted by Sony Music Hong Kong and won the championship. Pang's debut solo EP, Goodbye Nineteen, was released in February 1989. In the same year, she was arranged by the company to join Asia Television as a partner with Baby Bo Pui-yue and Fanny Cheng Sui-fan.

In August 2013, Pang performed "Never Like Being Alone" (從不喜歡孤單一個) with Red Sun Entertainment Chairman Chu Sau-yan at a fundraising event. In December of the same year, she rejoined Hong Kong Sony Music Entertainment Hong Kong to prepare for the release of an album.
