= The Prince's Shadow =

Hong Kong television series

- Poster
- Genre: Costume drama
- Starring: Adam Cheng; Sheren Tang; Tavia Yeung; Joyce Tang; Marco Ngai
- Opening theme: Juet Sai Han Yan (絕世閒人) performed by Adam Cheng
- Country of origin: Hong Kong
- Original language: Cantonese
- No. of episodes: 20

Production
- Running time: 45 minutes per episode

Original release
- Network: TVB
- Release: March 14 – April 18, 2005

The Prince's Shadow
- Traditional Chinese: 御用閒人
- Simplified Chinese: 御用闲人
Transcriptions
Yue: Cantonese
- Jyutping: Jyu6 Jung6 Haan4 Jan4

The Prince's Shadow is a Hong Kong television series first broadcast on TVB in March 2005. It stars Adam Cheng, Sheren Tang, Tavia Yeung, Joyce Tang & Marco Ngai.

== Synopsis ==
As a child Ko Sing (Adam Cheng) entered the Qing court to act as a whipping boy to the Qianlong Emperor (Marco Ngai) and continues to live at court as a hanger on. However unknown to all, the Qianlong Emperor is not the literate and able ruler of history but a foolish and incompetent one. Only with the aid of Ko Sing is he able to protect his reputation and the reputation of the Qing court. Playing the role of a layabout with no official titles or duties, Ko Sing acts as a trouble shooter within the palace, allowing plotters and malcontents to underestimate him until it is too late.

Although Qianlong has a harem of thousands, the Empress (Joyce Tang) controls the harem, and arranges either consorts from her own clan or very ugly ones to serve the Emperor's bed. Finding the Empress's arrangements not to his liking Qianlong becomes besotted with Yu-yee (Tavia Yeung), a newly arrived servant girl in the palace, and demands that Ko Sing help bring her to him.

Unwilling to become the play thing of the Emperor, Yu-yee escapes from the palace but in doing so falls into the hands of slavers who sell her on to a brothel. Believing that Yu-yee has been stolen from the palace, along with other treasures, Qianlong sends Ko Sing in pursuit. Ko Sing finds that Yu-yee is in the possession of brothel madam So Sam (Sheren Tang) and not realizing that the brothel is actually a sanctuary for young girls, he tries to buy the brothel. Yu-yee eventually discovers that the brothel is a safe haven and tells Ko Sing that she would rather stay at the brothel than to become the Emperor's toy.

After Yu-yee is accused of murder, So Sam helps to release her and the brothel struggles financially. Ko Sing helps by purchasing the brothel. In order to fund the purchase of the brothel, Ko sing creates an artwork attributed to the Emperor and which he sells (in fact all of the Emperor's previous calligraphy and artwork is the work of Ko Sing), this artwork finds its way back to the palace, and reveals to the Emperor where Ko Sing and Yu-yee are.

The Emperor arrives at the brothel in disguise and resides there. He is served and tricked by the other girls but not Yu-yee to the detriment of the affairs of state. When the Empress arrives and convinces The Emperor to return to the palace but he is unwilling at first.

Meanwhile, So Sam's tragic past and her dedication to saving young girls is revealed when she is accused of murder. The Empress encounters her past lover who is the true murderer but due to his link with the Empress, Ko Sing has to find another way to prove So Sam's innocence.

Eventually the Emperor returns to the palace with Ko Sing but he is so enamoured with the brothel and its occupants that he has the brothel recreated in the grounds of the palace and has So Sam, Yu-yee and the other girls taken captive.

Knowing that such an arrangement will damage the reputation of the Empire and the Emperor's ability to rule, the Empress and Ko Sing plot to free the girls from the palace. They do this by presenting the girls formally to the Emperor as candidates to be Imperial consorts but swap out some of the girls, given the Empress's previous habit of offering extremely ugly candidates to him. The Emperor rejects the girls out of hand and, without inspecting all of them, orders them to be sent away.

== Cast ==
Note:the romanisation of the characters' names uses a Cantonese romanisation.

Cast	Role
Adam Cheng	Ko Sing
Sheren Tang	So Sam
Tavia Yeung	Yu-yee
Marco Ngai	Kin-lung Emperor
Joyce Tang	Empress
Carlo Ng	Chow Yat-ching
Angela Tong	Lady Sui
Savio Tsang	Sok-lok-to
Ram Chiang	Yeung Koo
Catherine Chau	Lady Wai
Gordon Liu	Nin Mau-lam
Bowie Wu	Chan Sai-koon
