= Zhu Yan =

Chinese ballet dancer

Zhu Yan (Chinese: 朱妍) is a Chinese ballet dancer. Since 1995, she has danced with the National Ballet of China where she is now the leading prima ballerina.

== Biography ==
Zhu Yan started dancing ballet when she was nine. After graduating from the Beijing Dance Academy in 1995, she joined the National Ballet of China where she became a principal dancer in 2004. As of 2013, she is the company's leading prima ballerina. She has performed leading roles in most of the classical ballets, including Swan Lake, Don Quixote, The Sleeping Beauty and Giselle. She has also danced in the contemporary works The Rite of Spring, Four Last Songs and Études as well as in many of the ballets choreographed by Georges Balanchine.

She has performed as a guest artist in La Sylphide with the Royal Swedish Ballet in 1996, and with the Royal Danish Ballet in 2005. She has also danced in Swan Lake with the Royal New Zealand Ballet and Giselle at the Hong Kong Ballet. In 2004, she danced in Raise the Red Lantern at London's Covent Garden Theatre.

In December 2011, Zhu Yan was appointed special ambassador to Air France. She welcomed the position as being of "emotional and symbolic importance", explaining "France and Paris also have a special place in my heart, as this is where I won my first international ballet prize in 1994."

== Awards ==
Zhu's awards at major international competitions include:

- Special Award, 6th Paris International Ballet Competition (1994)
- Gold Medal, 18th Varna International Ballet Competition (1998)
- Prix Benois de la Danse (2011)
