= La Femme Desperado =

- La Femme Desperado poster
- 女人唔易做
- Genre: Modern Drama
- Starring: Melissa Ng; Sheren Tang; Raymond Lam; Michael Tse; Kenneth Ma; Kate Tsui
- Ending theme: "有過去的女人" by Miriam Yeung
- Country of origin: Hong Kong
- Original language: Cantonese
- No. of episodes: 22

Production
- Producer: Poon Ka Tak (潘嘉德)
- Running time: 45 minutes (approx.)

Original release
- Network: TVB
- Release: April 17 – May 14, 2006

Related
- Men in Pain (2006)

La Femme Desperado (Traditional Chinese: 女人唔易做) is a TVB modern drama series broadcast in April 2006. The series contains many realistic elements relating to the life of a woman in today's modern society, particularly in Hong Kong. It was considered to be a favourite among audiences, ranking number 1 in audience ratings for TVB series that year. It was widely praised by critics and audiences for its acting, writing and character development. It won the TVB Anniversary Award for Best Drama Series in 2006.

== Synopsis ==
There are three pairs of couples and their roles highlight the roles of women in modern society:

- Chai Foon (Raymond Lam) and Ko Chi-Ling (Melissa Ng) - Chai Foon has been in love with his tutor, Ling, since he was 11 and she was 18. They depict the problems of overcoming a seven-year age gap in traditional Chinese society.
- Man King-Leung (Michael Tse) and Hilda Hoi Kiu (Sheren Tang) - shows their quest to power and fame, their readiness to sacrifice anything - even their loved ones - for the sake of climbing the corporate ladder. However, throughout the show, their characters began to make the realization that love and family are actually much more significant in life than success in the business world.
- Ko Chi-Lik (Kenneth Ma) and Ida Hoi Suen (Kate Tsui) - focuses on the status of women in modern society. Raised in a patriarchal environment, Lik, who has very old-fashioned thinking, believes that women cannot become sushi chefs. He believes that women should be staying at home, cooking, serving their husbands and caring for their children. Ida on the other hand, is a very strong-willed modern Chinese woman. Through her determination, confidence and persistence, she proves her skills to him. Their frequent conflict and arguments over the rights and roles of women and Lik's eventual realization that women can indeed accomplish greater accomplishments than men show the gradual progression of value changes.

== Alternate Ending ==
For the first time in TVB drama history, an alternate ending was created for the series. An interview special, hosted by Carol Cheng, was aired after the finale which featured Melissa Ng, Sheren Tang, Kate Tsui, and Michael Tse. During the special, a three-minute alternate ending was shown to audiences featuring the final two scenes but unlike the original ending that is more open ended, Hilda makes it clear to Man that he is the biological father of their child and Ling tells Hilda that she will marry Chai Foon again but this time, it is her own choice and for herself.

== Cast ==
=== Main cast ===
Cast	Role	Description
Sheren Tang	Hoi Kiu (Hilda) 海翹	37 years old Pluto Company Product Manager; Man King-Leung's lover. Hoi Suen's older sister.
Melissa Ng	Ko Chi-Ling 高志玲	32 years old Pluto Company Product Assistant Manager; Chai Foon's wife. Man King-Leung's ex-wife. Ko Wing-Tim and Lau Wai-Sim's daughter. Ko Chi-Lik and Ko Chi-Lun's sister.
Raymond Lam	Chai Foon 齊寬	25 years old Pluto Company Clerk; Ko Chi-Ling's husband.
Michael Tse	Man King-Leung (Man) 文景良	38 years old Hoi Kiu's lover. Ko Chi-Ling's ex-husband.
Kenneth Ma	Ko Chi-Lik 高志力	29 years old Sushi Chef; Hoi Suen's lover. Ko Wing-Tim and Lau Wai-Sim's son. Ko Chi-Ling and Ko Chi-Lun's younger brother.
Kate Tsui	Hoi Suen (Ida) 海璇	24 years old Ko Chi-Lik's lover. Hoi Kiu's younger sister.

=== Other cast ===
Cast	Role	Description
Cindy Au	Kong Ching-Ching (Crystal) 江晶晶	21 years old Please Company Owner; Kong Wing-Nin's granddaughter.
Jacqueline Law (羅慧娟)	Huen Bo-Ting (Venus) 禤寶婷	37 years old Ma Sai-Hin's wife. Hoi Kiu's university classmate.
Savio Tsang (曾偉權)	Ma Sai-Hin 馬世軒	45 years old Pluto Company Owner; Huen Bo-Ting's husband.
Bryan Leung	Ko Wing-Tim 高榮添	55 years old Lau Wai-Sim's husband. Ko Chi-Lun, Ko Chi-Ling, and Ko Chi-Lik's father.
Ching Hor Wai (程可為)	Lau Wai-Sim 劉慧嬋	Ko Wing-Tim's wife. Ko Chi-Lun, Ko Chi-Ling, and Ko Chi-Lik's mother.
Li Ka Sing (李家聲)	Ko Chi-Lun 高志能	35 years old Taxi Driver; Koon Ka-Lun's husband. Ko Wing-Tim and Lau Wai-Sim's son. Ko Chi-Ling and Ko Chi-Lik's older brother.
Natalie Wong	Koon Ka-Yung 管嘉蓉	Ko Chi-Lun's wife.
Lai Suen (黎宣)	Cheung Pak-Chi 章柏枝	Convenience Store Owner; Chai Foon's grandmother.
Mary Hon (韓馬利)	Tong Lai-Chu 唐麗珠	47 years old Chai Foon's mother.
Kong Hon (江漢)	Kong Wing-Nin 江永年	Please Company Founder; Kong Ching-Ching's grandfather.
Derek Kok	Cho Ka-Po (KP) 曹家普	Please Company Asia Pacific CEO; Hoi Kiu's ex-lover. Hoi Kiu's ex-colleague/ex-superior at Please Company; Hoi Kiu's ex-boyfriend.
June Chan (陳琪)	Ho Nga-Kei (Jackie) 何雅琪	Huen Bo-Ting's cousin.
Akina Hong (康華)	Mary	Appears in Ep.07; 35 years old Actress that was cast for Chai Foon's shampoo commercial.

== Characters ==
- Ko Chi-Ling (Melissa Ng), nicknamed "Ko Ling", is a 32-year-old assistant manager of Pluto, a consumer product distributor. Ling comes from a very traditional family, who expected women to marry and give birth to children as soon as possible, and avoid a professional career. After finding out that her husband and co-worker Man King Leung had an affair, she divorced him, and began to learn from Hilda as she makes her way up in the corporate world.
- Hilda Hoi Kiu (Sheren Tang) is a 37-year-old product manager of Pluto. She is considered to be the definition of a strong businesswoman. Hilda would use all her charm to get business, often alienating many coworkers in the process. Her characteristics of a strong businesswoman is "forced-out" due to the huge disappointment towards men when her ex-boyfriend whom she loved accused her for the sake of climbing up the corporate ladder plus the fact her father abandon their family for another woman further deepen it. However, the otherside of her is very gentle and feminine, towards her sister Hoi Suen.
- Ida Hoi Suen (Kate Tsui) is the sister of Hilda. Hilda's and Ida relationship was very close in the earlier days, however was strained due to the over-concern by Hilda which back-fired. She fell in love with her sushi mentor.
- Man King-Leung (Michael Tse) is a 38-year-old worker at Pluto. He is known to climb up the corporate greasy pole at all costs, earning him the title "Scum Man". after his divorce with Ko Ling, he had a relationship with Hilda. Man left Pluto to become an executive at Please, a department store chain, out of spite.
- Chai Foon (Raymond Lam) is married to Ko Chi-Ling, despite a 7-year age difference between them. He acts on an impulse, and this led to strains in their marriage.
- Ko Chi-Lik (Kenneth Ma) is the younger brother of Ling. He is a sushi chef by profession, and fell in love with his student, Ida Hoi. His father's chauvinistic attitudes rubbed off on him, and this caused much strain in their relationship.

== Viewership ratings ==
	Week	Episode	Average Points	Peaking Points	References
1	April 17–21, 2005	1 — 5	31	—	
2	April 24–28, 2005	6 — 10	33	—	
3	May 1–5, 2005	11 — 15	33	—	
4	May 8–12, 2005	16 — 20	34	38	
4	May 14, 2005	21 — 22	37	41	

== Awards and nominations ==
=== Awards ===
39th TVB Anniversary Awards (2006)

- "Best Drama"
- "Most Improved Actor" (Kenneth Ma)

Ming Pao (2006) Television Awards

- "Best Drama Series"

=== Nominations ===
39th TVB Anniversary Awards (2006)

- Nominated - "Best Actor in a Leading Role" (Raymond Lam - Chai Foon) Top 5
- Nominated - "Best Actor in a Leading Role" (Michael Tse - Man King-Leung)
- Nominated - "Best Actress in a Leading Role" (Sheren Tang - Hilda Hoi Kiu) Top 5
- Nominated - "Best Actor in a Supporting Role" (Kenneth Ma - Ko Chi-Lik)
- Nominated - "Best Actor in a Supporting Role" (Li Ka Sing - Ko Chi-Lun)
- Nominated - "Best Actor in a Supporting Role" (Bryan Leung - Ko Wing-Tim)
- Nominated - "Best Actress in a Supporting Role" (Kate Tsui - Ida Hoi Suen)
- Nominated - "Best Actress in a Supporting Role" (Cindy Au - Kong Ching-Ching)
- Nominated - "My Favourite Male Character Role" (Raymond Lam - Chai Foon) Top 5
- Nominated - "My Favourite Male Character Role" (Michael Tse - Man King-Leung)
- Nominated - "My Favourite Female Character Role" (Sheren Tang - Hilda Hoi Kiu) Top 5
- Nominated - "My Favourite Female Character Role" (Kate Tsui - Ida Hoi Suen)
- Nominated - "My Favourite Female Character Role" (Melissa Ng - Ko Chi-Ling)
- Nominated - "Most Improved Actor" (Michael Tse)
