= File of Justice =

- 壹號皇庭
- Genre: Legal Drama
- Directed by: Gary Tang; Alex Pao; Ng Lap-kwong; Cheung Siu-fong; Sandy Shaw
- Starring: (See entire cast list below)
- Opening theme: Your Latest Trick by Dire Straits
- Country of origin: Hong Kong
- Original language: Cantonese
- No. of episodes: 119

Production
- Producer: Gary Tang
- Editors: Gary Tang; Szeto Kam-yuen; Alex Pao; Mak Chi-sing
- Running time: 45 minutes

Original release
- Network: TVB
- Release: April 19, 1992 – May 9, 1997

The File of Justice (壹號皇庭) is a series of Hong Kong legal drama produced by TVB. There were 5 seasons produced, the first was aired in 1992 spanning 13 episodes. The series revolves around a group of lawyers and legal personnel with stories interwoven between their personal lives and the court cases (usually one that involves murder) in which they're engaged.

It was also noteworthy that first 2 murder cases in the first series ended in capital punishment because it was not abolished in Hong Kong until 1993, yet the last punishment carried out was back in 1966.

This series was also well known for featuring then relatively unknown artists in guest starring or minor roles, who later went on to greater success in film, television or music including Gordon Lam, Leo Ku, Wayne Lai, Joe Ma, Ruco Chan, Kenny Wong.

The theme music is an instrumental version of "Your Latest Trick" by Dire Straits.

== Characters ==
- Ben Yu – A successful prosecutor turned barrister and the protagonist of the series. Often humorous and charming, Ben is also occasionally the butt of jokes to his friends (especially to Michael) because of his tolerance and partly due to his clumsiness. He suffers from a crush for his colleague and fellow lawyer Michelle, who has rejected him on numerous occasions. He shares an apartment with his close friend Raymond and his cousin Man-Bun who is a police detective. Ben is played by Bobby Au Yeung.
- Michelle Ting – Ben's colleague and love interest, a prosecutor. Michelle is an example of the modern day alpha female – headstrong, stubborn and no-nonsense. Initially, she is fairly cold towards Ben's attempt at wooing her, finding them to be childish and annoying. However, as time goes on, she gradually sees his affection for her to be genuine and accepts him in return. She was Henry Lee's concubine. Michelle is played by Amy Chan.
- Michael Kong – A paralegal advisor who is best friend to Ben Yu and Raymond Chow. Amongst the group, Michael is shown to be the manipulative and mischievous one. He is sometimes slightly immature and rather cocky and at most times who takes joy in messing around with Ben and Raymond. He works for his widowed mother's law firm and helps her and his sister Helen in handling their cases. Despite his smart alec personality, he does have a kind hearted side and is willing to help those who are less privileged. Michael Kong is played by Michael Tao.
- Helen Kong – Michael's younger sister who is also a lawyer at their mother's firm, a barrister. Beautiful and intelligent, Helen has a strong work ethic and wisdom beyond her year when it comes to court case matters. She briefly dated Ben's cousin Man-Bun but soon separated due to personal differences. Helen is played by Eugina Lau.
- Raymond Chow – A close friend to Ben and Michael who also works at Michael's law firm. Generally friendly and good-natured, Raymond is also a man who takes himself too seriously and is far less humorous than his peers. Moralistic and timid, he often disapproves of Michael's immature ways of handling situations. He is also an occasional victim of Ben's crazy schemes when he is attempting to hook-up with Michelle. Raymond is Played by William So.

== Cast ==
The first (1992), second (1993), third (1994), fourth (1995) and fifth (1997) installments starring:

Character	Actor	Occupation	Seasons
Ben Yu Choi-chun (余在春)	Bobby Au Yeung	Prosecutor (S1)	Season 1-5
Ben Yu Choi-chun (余在春)	Bobby Au Yeung	Barrister (S1-5)	Season 1-5
Michael Kong Shing-yu (江承宇)	Michael Tao	Paralegal Advisor	Season 1-5
Raymond Chow Chi-fai (周志輝)	William So	Solicitor	Season 1-5
Chow Man-bun (周文彬)	Felix Lok	Police Sergeant	Season 1-5
Michelle Ting Yau (丁柔)	Amy Chan	Prosecutor	Season 1-4
Lora Kong Lee Chung-wan (江李頌雲)	So Hang-suen	Queen's Counsel	Season 1-4
Helen Kong Shing-chau (江承宙)	Eugina Lau	Barrister	Season 1-3
Josephine "Jo" Fong Ka-kei (方家琪)	Sammi Cheng	Barrister	Season 1
Josephine "Jo" Fong Ka-kei (方家琪)	Wallis Pang	Barrister	Season 4
Henry Lee Kwok-chu (李國柱)	Patrick Dunn	Barrister	Season 1-2
Mandy "Man" Tong Yuk-man (唐毓文)	Faye Wong	Prosecutor	Season 2
Queenie Tong Tsz-shan (湯芷珊)	Iwanbeo Leung	Mamasan	Season 2
Susan Tong Tsz-kei (湯芷琪)	Iwanbeo Leung	Interior Designer	Season 3-4
Jessica Kwan Ching (關靜)	Bessie Chan	Lawyer (S2)	Season 1-4
Jessica Kwan Ching (關靜)	Bessie Chan	Prosecutor (S3-4)	Season 1-4
Eric Chow Siu-chung (周少聰)	Ram Chiang	Barrister	Season 2-5
Doris Lam Hok-yee (林學宜)	Yvonne Lam	Police Inspector	Season 2-5
Jeff Cheung Ka-yin (張家賢)	Hong Chao Feng	Prosecutor (S2)	Season 2-4
Jeff Cheung Ka-yin (張家賢)	Dickson Li		Season 5
Joe Li Sai-wang (李世宏)	Bowie Lam	Barrister	Season 3
Kelvin Fong Wai-ho (方偉豪)	Bowie Lam	Prosecutor (S4)	Season 4-5
Samantha "Sam" Ching Yeuk-fai (程若暉)	Jessica Hsuan	Barrister	Season 4-5
Joyce Yan Tsz-kit (殷芷杰)	Sheren Tang	Forensic Pathologist	Season 4
Joyce Yan Tsz-kit (殷芷杰)	Meiki Wong (Teenage)	Forensic Pathologist	Season 4
Rachel Ching Yeuk-hei (程若曦)	Astrid Chan	Barrister (S4)	Season 4-5
Rachel Ching Yeuk-hei (程若曦)	Astrid Chan	Prosecutor (S5)	Season 4-5
Victor Ching Lok-tin (程樂天)	Chor Yuen	Judge	Season 4-5
Chris Yau Wing-hong (邱永康)	Patrick Tam	Prosecutor (S4-5)	Season 4-5
Chris Yau Wing-hong (邱永康)	Patrick Tam	Barrister (S5)	Season 4-5
Anthony Yau Wing-kin (邱永健)	Wayne Lai	Legal Clerk	Season 4-5
Stephen Chan Cheuk-yiu (陳卓堯)	Steven Ma	Doctor	Season 4-5
Catherine "Cat" Au Tsz-keung (歐子強)	Flora Chan	Barrister	Season 5
Lee Tung (李彤)	Ada Choi		Season 5
Alex Tsui Wai-kit (徐偉杰)	Lawrence Ng	Senior Police Inspector	Season 5
Eva Chiu Lai-ying (趙麗瑩)	Eileen Yeow		Season 5
Stephanie Kwai Yuk-kiu (夔彧藠)	Joyce Koi	Doctor	Season 5
Jenny Lai Ka-yui (黎家蕊)	Chen Xiaoyun	Prosecutor	Season 5

== Recurring characters ==
- Leung Kin-ping as Paul, prosecutor (1992–94; & 1997; seasons 1–3; & 5; recurring)
- Leong Oy / Alice Fung So-bor as Leung Mei-ying(梁美英，英姐), maid of Kong's Family, mother of Anthony Yau and Chris Yau (1992-1997; seasons 1–5; recurring)
- Wong Yat-fei as Yu Chiu-choi(余招財), father of Ben Yu (1992-1993; seasons 1–2; recurring)
- May Tse as Wong Wing-mui(王詠梅), mother of Ben Yu (1992; seasons 1; recurring)
- Amy Wu as Yu Choi-tung(余在冬), elder sister of Ben Yu (1992; seasons 1; recurring)
- Chan Wing-chun as Ho Keung(何強), brother in law of Ben Yu (1992; seasons 1; recurring)
- Lee Wong-sang as Keung(強), police detective (1992-1995 seasons 1-4; recurring)
- Daniel Kwok as Chiu(超), police detective (1992-1995; seasons 1-4; recurring)
- Bertha Ngai as Shirley, Wife of Henry Lee (1992; seasons 1; recurring)
- Joanna Siu as May Wong Mei-ling(王美玲), Queenie Tong's lesbian lover (1993; seasons 2; recurring)
- Kenneth Chan as Wilson, Doris Lam's boyfriend (1993; season 2; recurring)
- Liz Kong as Grace Fong Hei-tung(方曦彤), solicitor (1994; season 3; recurring)
- Eddie Ng as Ken Chu Ka-hong(朱家康), legal clerk (1994; season 3; recurring)
- Shirley Yuen as Shirley Wong Suet-yi(王雪怡), victim (1994; season 3; recurring)
- Zhang Yan as Eva Lam Shuk-han(林淑嫻), nurse (1994; season 3; recurring)
- Sam Lam as George Pao Sze-chuen(鮑思全), doctor (1994; season 3; recurring)
- Derek Kok as Wong On(王安), police detective (1994-5; season 3-4; recurring)
- Joe Ma as Dicky Tse Chun-kit(謝俊傑), Susan Tong's first boyfriend (1994; season 3; recurring)
- Lee Lung-kei as Philip Law Wai-lam(羅偉林), Susan Tong's ex-lover (1994-5; season 3-4; recurring)
- Mark Kwok as Tommy Cheng Tze-wai(鄭子偉), police detective (1995; season 4; recurring)
- Daisy Wong as Ada, legal clerk (1995; season 4; recurring)
- Gordon Liu as Au Kwok-kin(歐國堅), father of Catherine Au (1997; season 5; recurring)
- Lisa Lui as Yip Hau-ming(葉巧明), step-mother of Catherine Au (1997; season 5; recurring)
- Wong Wai as Chiu Chak-choi(趙澤財), father of Eva Chiu (1997; season 5; recurring)
- Lily Li as Tam Siu-lan (譚少蘭), defendant (1994; season 3), also as Wong Mei-lin(王美蓮), mother of Eva Chiu (1997; season 5; recurring)
- Carrie Ho as Yeung Ka-lai-na(楊嘉麗娜), police detective (1997; season 5; recurring)
- Angie Cheong as Daisy Zhang(張小燕), Eric Chow's girlfriend (1997; season 5; recurring)
- Timothy Siu as So Chun-wai(蘇振威), Kelvin Fong's sub-ordinate (1997; season 5; recurring)
- Evergreen Mak as Yeung Ka-man(楊家文), younger brother of Yeung Ka-chun (1997; season 5; recurring)
- Kam Hing-yin as Yeung Ka-chun(楊家俊), older brother of Yeung Ka-man (1997; season 5; recurring)

== Series overview ==
Season	Episodes	First aired in Hong Kong
1	13	April 19, 1992
2	15	April 18, 1993
3	20	October 10, 1994
4	26	September 11, 1995
5	45	March 10, 1997
