= Corruption Doesn't Pay =

- poster
- 廉政英雌之火槍柔情
- Genre: Police procedural, Action; Romance
- Written by: Lam Shiu Chi
- Starring: Sheren Tang, Waise Lee, Esther Kwan, Kiki Cheung, Cheung Kwok Keung, Li Shing Cheong, Betty Mak, Lau Kong
- Opening theme: 出色女子 "Outstanding Woman". lyrics by Sandy Cheung, sung by Cass Phang
- Composer: Andrew Tuason
- Country of origin: Hong Kong
- Original language: Cantonese
- No. of episodes: 20

Production
- Producer: Amy Wong
- Production location: Hong Kong
- Running time: 45 minutes (each)
- Production company: TVB

Original release
- Network: Jade
- Release: 8 May – 2 June 1995

Corruption Doesn't Pay (廉政英雌之火槍柔情) is a 1995 Hong Kong police procedural television drama starring Sheren Tang, Esther Kwan, Kiki Sheung, Waise Lee, and Cheung Kwok Keung. The series was first broadcast on TVB in Hong Kong from 8 May to 2 June 1995. The 20-episode long series focuses on the Independent Commission Against Corruption solving different cases of a financial nature. Insurance fraud in episode 1–3; immigration stamp fraud in episode 5–7; credit card fraud in episode 7–10; drug smuggling and police corruption in episode 10–13; shell companies and money laundering in episodes 14–20. Tang, Kwan, and Sheung portray the armed women investigators who help crack the cases.

The television serial was written by Lam Shiu Chi, who also wrote the similar themed, and similar Chinese titled TVB direct-to-video television movie Sharpshooters (廉政英雌) in 1994. That movie, starring Kara Wai, Elvina Kong, and Lee Kwai Ying, also focused on the armed women crime fighters of the ICAC.

== Synopsis ==
The Independent Commission Against Corruption has many talented people who help fight financial crime and corruption. Poon (Sheren Tang) a senior investigator in the Operations department is the only female Arms Issued Officer (AIO) among the nearly two dozen armed officers within the organization. Her bravery in rescuing Polly (Ester Kwan) in a hostage situation impresses upon Polly to join the ICAC to work with Poon. Together, Poon, Polly, and colleague Si Lai (Kiki Sheung) solve major cases, undergo dangerous missions, and become best friends.

While the trio has demanding work careers, they also have personal lives. Their relationship with their family and partners soon come into conflict. Poon separates from her long time boyfriend; Polly deals with her estranged stepfather; Si Lai's husband grows closer to the babysitter.

== Cast ==
=== ICAC Operations Team B ===
Cast	Role	Description
Waise Lee	Cheuk Ming (卓明) aka "卓官 Cheuk Kun"	Senior Investigative Officer Team B Arms Issued Officer; Crystal's husband loves Poon Wai Yan
Sheren Tang	Poon Wai Yan (潘慰欣)	Senior Investigator; Arms Issued Officer; Cheuk Ming's love interest Kei Cheung's love interest
Kiki Sheung	Chee Zhong Lin (池中蓮) aka "師奶 Housewife"	Kwok Ka On's wife
Esther Kwan	Kam Bo Lai (甘寶妮) aka "寶莉 Polly"	Po Siu Chung's stepdaughter Calvin's love interest
Li Shing Cheong	Kan Kwok Piu (簡國標)	Arms Issued Officer
Tony Ho	Yee Kay Fong (余其方) aka "余公子 Prince Yee"	
Cheng Pak Leon	Cheung Sa Kun (張志權) aka "Cool man"	
	Marco	
Deon Cheung	Gordon	
	Bobby	

=== Supporting Characters ===
Cast	Role	Description
Lau Kong	Po Siu Chung (布少祥)	Dietitian; Polly's stepfather
Cheung Ying Choi	Mr. Poon aka "Ah Dac (阿德)"	Poon Wai Yan's father
Lai Suen	Mrs. Poon "Mama"	Poon Wai Yan's mother
Alex Fong	Chong Man Hin (Calvin)	Yu Fung Financial executive Playboy loves Polly
Savio Tsang	Kwok Ka On (郭家安)	trading company executive Chee's husband loves Miss Yip
Bessie Chan	Yip Lai Yu (葉麗茹) aka "Miss Yip"	School teacher Chee Zhong Lin and Kwok Ka On's babysitter Kwok Ka On's love interest
Henry Lo	Ng Lap Kwong (伍立光)	Poon Wai Yan's boyfriend
Jane Ma	Crystal	Cheuk Ming's wife
Cheung Kwok Keung	Ma Kei Cheung (馬其昌)	Boss of Asia Pacific Century Group; Boss of Sing Sai Group shell company loves Poon Wai Yan; Villain, episode 14-20
Ricky Lee	Lau Tung Wing (劉東榮) aka "John"	Financial Director of Yu Fung Financial, episode 14-16
Betty Mak	Lai Yuk Ha (李玉霞)	Happy Travel travel agency owner Song B's girlfriend Insurance fraudster Villain, episode 1-3
	Ma Sai Hung (馬世雄) aka "Song B (喪 B)"	Lai Yuk Ha's boyfriend Insurance fraudster Villain, episode 1-3
Carrie Ho	Liu Siu Wan (寥小芸)	Insurance agent Insurance fraudster, episode 1-3
Jiang Wenduan	Sun Hong (孫紅)	episode 5-7
Koei Leung	Kitty Wong	Reporter, episode 5-6
Wong Man Piu	Ng Zan Lung (吳振龍)	Fence witness, episode 19-20
Mickey Chu	Tsui Cing An (徐正安) aka "Stephen"	Student; Identity fraudster, episode 8-9
Chan Wing Chun	Chan Dak Wing (陳德榮)	Postman; Identity fraudster, episode 8-9
	Chan Hon Man aka "Bob"	Drug smuggler, episode 10-13
	Lai Siu Yee (黎少芝) aka "Sam"	Flight stewardess Drug smuggler, episode 10-13
Charles Tam	K.W. Tsim "詹Sir"	ICAC Director of Operations
Ben Wong	Go Luo (高佬)	ICAC Technical Services Department technician
Gregory Rivers	Lu Tsu (陸徐)	ICAC Firearms Training Director, episode 10
	張成剛 aka "張Sir"	ICAC Senior Investigative Officer Team A
