= Amy Chan =

Hong Kong actress

Amy Chan Sau-man 陳秀雯
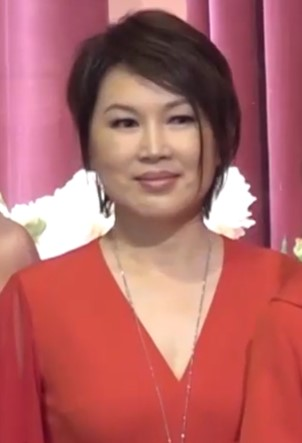
- Chan in 2019
- Born: Hong Kong
- Occupations: Actress; singer
- Years active: 1979–present
- Awards: ATV Best Actress; 1996 1997

Chinese name
- Traditional Chinese: 陳秀雯
- Simplified Chinese: 陈秀雯
Transcriptions
Standard Mandarin
- Hanyu Pinyin: Chén Xiùwén
Yue: Cantonese
- Jyutping: Can^{4} Sau^{3}-man^{4}

Amy Chan Sau-man (Chinese: 陳秀雯) is a Hong Kong actress and Cantopop singer, notable for starring in the File of Justice TV franchise in the 1990s. She is also the elder sister of actress Charine Chan (Chinese: 陳加玲).

== Filmography ==
=== Films ===
Year	Title	Role	Notes
1983	The Shy Boy (怕醜仔)	Green Sleeve	
1985	Carry On Doctors and Nurses (天使出更)	Fang Xiaomin	
1995	The World of Treasure (富貴人間)		

=== Television ===
Year	Title	Role	Notes
1979	Chameleon II (新變色龍)		
1980	Gone with the Wind (浮生六劫)	Ng Sze-wah (伍程思華)	
1980	Love Story 1980 (驟雨中的陽光)		
1980	The Dragon Sword (天龍神劍)		
1981	Tai Chi Master II (遊俠張三豐)		
1981	Four Couples (對對糊)		
1982	The Green Dragon Conspiracy (琥珀青龍)		
1982	The Conqueror (雄霸天下)		
1982	Ba Jin's Trilogy (家春秋)		
1986	Drama (達摩)		
1990	It Runs in the Family (孖仔孖心肝)		
1990	Silken Hands (自梳女)		
1991	Land of Glory (情陷特區)		
1991	Away of Justice (人海驕陽)		
1991	The Survivor (藍色風暴)		
1992	Love and Marriage (屬雞的男人)		
1992	File of Justice (壹號皇庭)	Michelle Ting Yau (丁柔)	
1993	Racing Peak (馬場大亨)		
1993	The Partner (怒火羔羊)		
1993	File of Justice II (壹號皇庭II)	Michelle Ting Yau (丁柔)	
1993	For Home's Sake (居者冇其屋)		
1993	Folk Sergeant (妙探出更)		
1994	Fate of the Clairvoyant (再見亦是老婆)	Yuen Pui-pui (元珮珮)	
1994	File of Justice III (壹號皇庭III)	Michelle Ting Yau (丁柔)	
1995	Forty Something (男人四十一頭家)		
1995	Hand of Hope (邊緣故事)		
1995	File of Justice IV (壹號皇庭IV)	Michelle Ting Yau (丁柔)	
1995	The Fist of Law (大捕快)		
1995	The Unexpected (一切從失蹤開始)		
1996	The Good Old Days (再見艷陽天)	Tse Sau-hau (謝秀巧)	
1997	Fated Love (天長地久)	Rong Caiyue (容採月)	
1998	The Heroine of the Yangs I (穆桂英之大破天門陣)	Mu Guiying (穆桂英)	
1998	The Heroine of the Yangs II (穆桂英之十二寡婦征西)	Mu Guiying (穆桂英)	
2000	Anything But Him (你想的愛)	Le Luo (陶樂洛)	
2003	Eternity: A Chinese Ghost Story (倩女幽魂)	Blue Demon (藍魔)	
2003	Love in a Miracle (愛在有情天)	Ruan Manqing (阮曼清)	
2006	The Young Warriors (少年楊家將)	She Saihua (佘賽花)	
2009	Love in Trouble Time (風雲歲月)	Maan Siu-zan	
2010	A Weaver on the Horizon (天涯織女)	Rong Xiuman (容秀滿)	
2010	The Men of Justice (法網群英)	Maggie Lam Mei-ki (林美琪)	
2019	Limited Education	Lam Mei-fan (林美芬)	
