= Vincent Lam =

Canadian writer (born 1974)

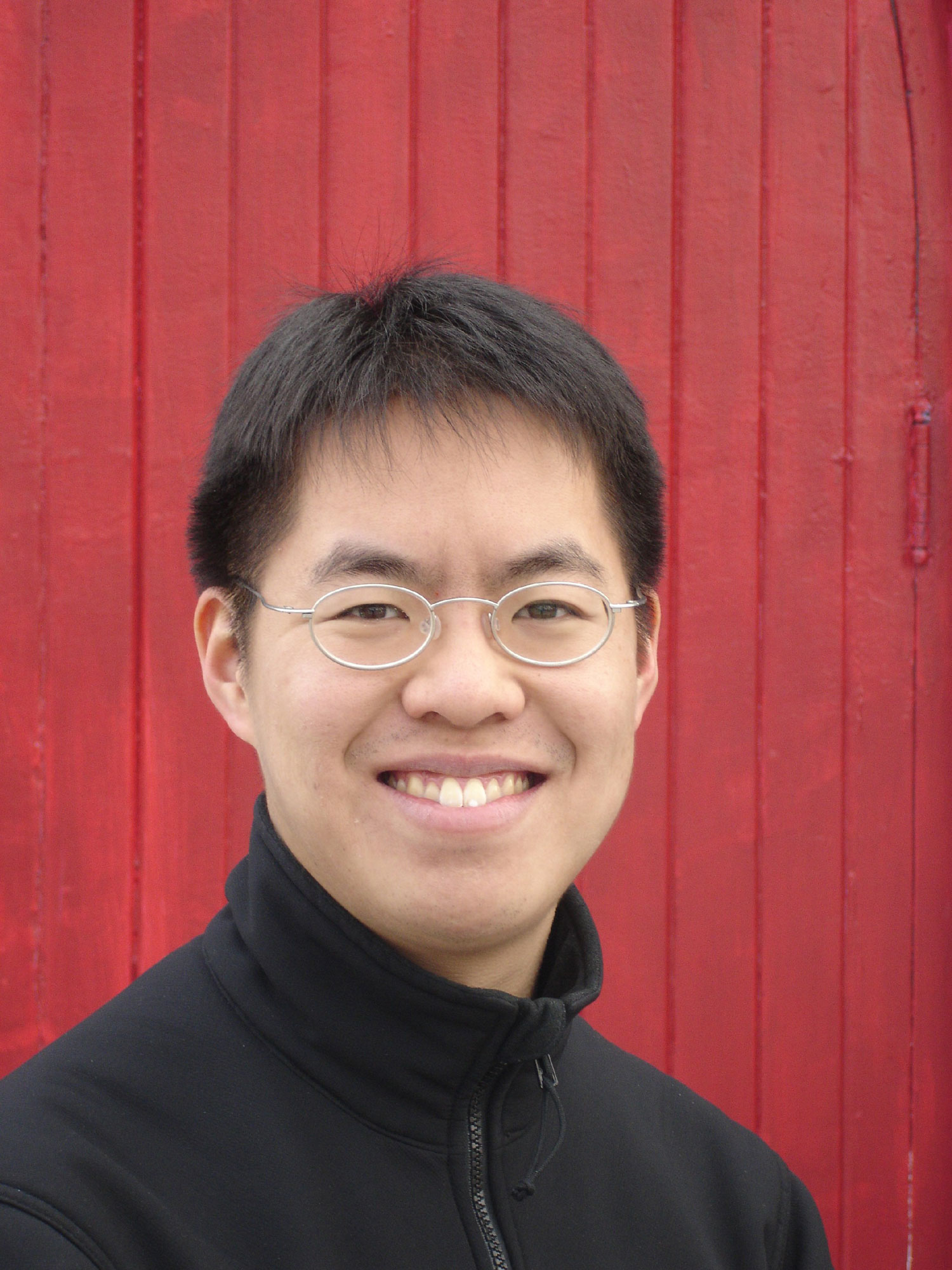
- Born: September 5, 1974 (age 52); London, Ontario, Canada
- Occupations: Short story writer, novelist, medical doctor
- Spouse: Margarita Lam Antoniades
- Writing career
- Period: 2000s–present
- Notable work: Bloodletting & Miraculous Cures
- Website: www.vincentlam.ca/index.php

Vincent Lam (born September 5, 1974) is a Canadian writer and medical doctor.

== Early life and education ==
Born in London, Ontario, and raised in Ottawa, Lam's parents came to Canada from the Chinese expatriate community in Vietnam. He attended St. Pius X High School and did his medical training at the University of Toronto, graduating in 1999.

== Career ==
Lam worked as an emergency physician at Toronto East General Hospital and has done international air evacuation work and expedition medicine on Arctic and Antarctic ships. He is currently working as an addictions physician at Coderix Medical Clinic.

=== Writing career ===
Lam's first book Bloodletting and Miraculous Cures is based on his experiences in medical school. Bloodletting and Miraculous Cures won the 2006 Scotiabank Giller Prize, on November 7, 2006. Bloodletting and Miraculous Cures was also a finalist for The Story Prize in 2008. His second book, the Flu Pandemic and You, which was co-authored by Colin Lee, was published in 2008.

Following Lam's Giller win, Shaftesbury Films announced that it had reached a deal to adapt Bloodletting into a television series, which debuted in January 2010 on HBO Canada.

Lam published a biography of Canadian politician Tommy Douglas, as part of Penguin Canada's Extraordinary Canadians series of historical biographies.

His first novel, The Headmaster's Wager, was published in 2012 by Doubleday Canada and has been shortlisted for the 2012 Governor General's Literary Award.

== Personal life ==
Lam currently lives with his wife and three children in Toronto.

== Bibliography ==
- The Flu Pandemic and You, co-written with Colin Lee with a foreword by Margaret Atwood (2006, ISBN 0-385-66277-7)
- Bloodletting and Miraculous Cures (2006, ISBN 0-385-66143-6)
- Extraordinary Canadians: Tommy Douglas (2011)
- The Headmaster's Wager (2012)
- On the Ravine (2023)
