= Kiki Sheung =

Hong Kong actress

- Born: July 24, 1963 (age 63); British Hong Kong
- Occupation: Actress
- Years active: 1984–present

Chinese name
Transcriptions
Standard Mandarin
- Hanyu Pinyin: Shāng Tiān'é
Yue: Cantonese
- Jyutping: Soeng^{1} Tin^{1} Ngo^{4}

Kiki Sheung Tin-ngoh (Chinese: 商天娥, born 24 July 1963) is a Hong Kong TVB actress. Kiki was originally with TVB, but moved over to rival station ATV in 1995. She moved back to TVB in 2002.

== Filmography ==
=== Television ===
Year	Title	Role
2021	Plan 'B'	Kam Mei-foon
2020	The Impossible 3	
2015	Brick Slaves	Joyce Lei Oi-wah
2014	Black Heart White Soul	Sin Wai-ying
2012	Wish and Switch	Lui Wong
2011-2012	Til Love Do Us Lie	Bobo Kan
2011	Super Snoops	Lam King-suet
2011	I Love Hong Kong	
2010	The Comeback Clan	
2010	Sisters of Pearl	Chu Pik-Wan
2009	Rosy Business	Pang Giu
2008	When Easterly Showers Fall on the Sunny West	Chong Fung Tak
2008	Last One Standing	Lau Git-Yee
2008	The Money-Maker Recipe	Tseung Yu-Chu
2008	The Seventh Day	Ling Bo-Tze
2007	The Family Link	Cho Mei-Ngoh
2006	Maiden's Vow	Tung Dai-Hei
2006	Below the Lion Rock	
2005	The Charm Beneath	Li Ah-Sin
2005	Yummy Yummy	
2005	Lost in the Chamber of Love	Cheung Lim-Yan
2004	The Last Breakthrough	Wong Po-hing
2004	Kung Fu Soccer	
2004	To Get Unstuck in Time	Cheung Yuet-ping
2002	Lady Stealer	
1999	Young Hero Fang Shi Yu	
1999	Food Glorious Food	
1996	The Good Old Days	
1996	Vampire Expert II	
1995	I Have a Date with Spring	
1995	Corruption Doesn't Pay	Chee Zhong Lin
1994	Instinct	Cheung Hok Wa
1989	Looking Back in Anger	Cindy Fung Mei Yan
1989	Two of a Kind	
1988	Twilight of a Nation	To Wai-tsan
1987	The Legend of the Book and the Sword	Chow Yee
1986	A Taste of Bachelorhood	
1985	The Battlefield	Lui Chi
1985	Sword Stained with Royal Blood	Kiu Yuen-yee
1984	The Duke of Mount Deer	Ah-or, Chen Yuen-yuen

=== Film ===
- The Detective (2007)
- I Love Hong Kong (2011)
- A Secret Between Us (2013)

== Awards and nominations ==
Year	Award	Category	Nominated work	Result
1990	Hong Kong Film Awards	Best Supporting Actress	Sentence to Hang	Nominated
