= Kenji Tanigaki =

Japanese action choreographer and film director (born 1970)

- 谷垣健治
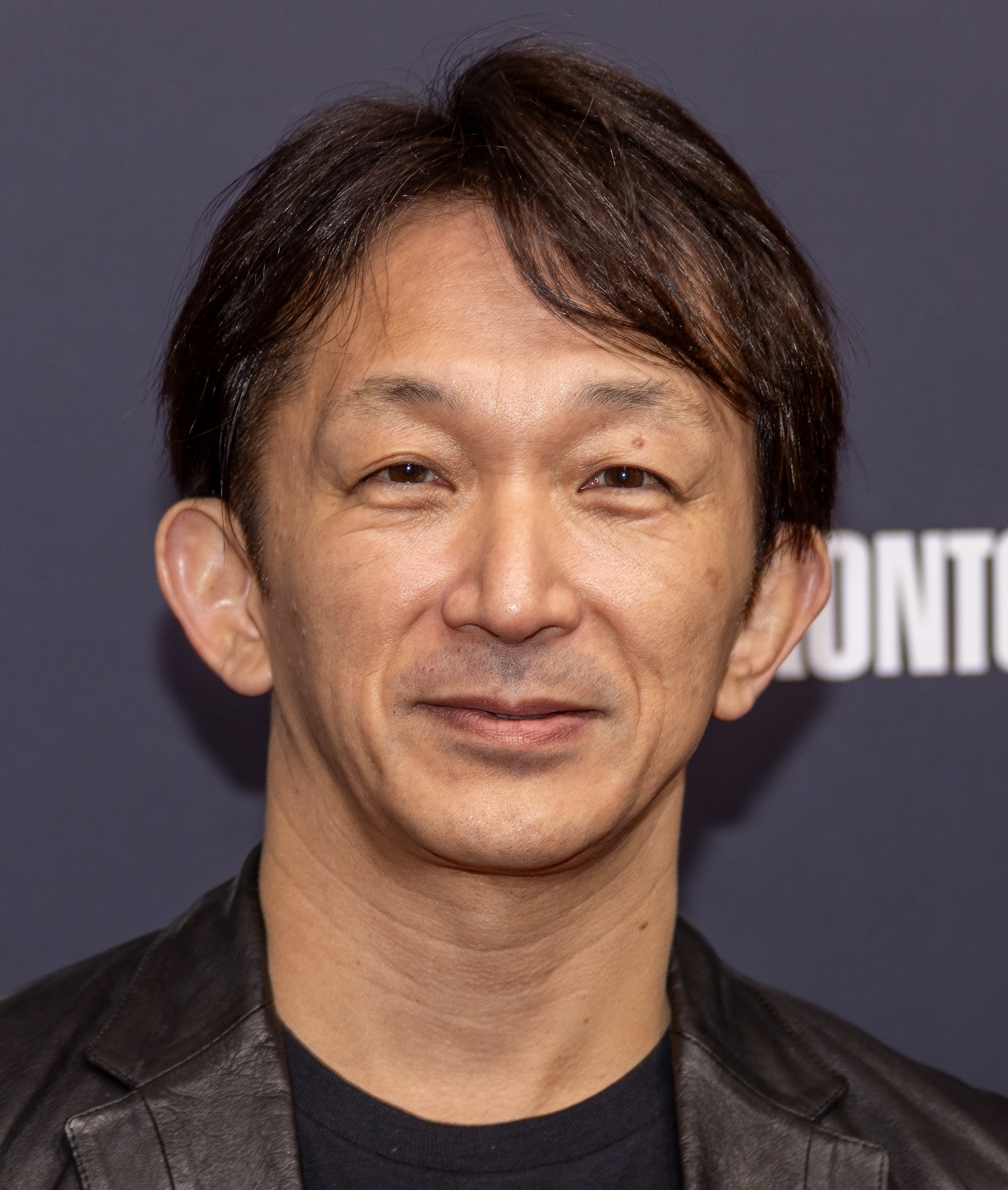
- Tanigaki in September 2025
- Born: 13 October 1970 (age 55); Nara Prefecture, Japan
- Education: Kwansei Gakuin University
- Occupations: Action choreographer; stunt performer; film director
- Years active: 1994–present

Japanese name
- Kanji: 谷垣 健治
- Hiragana: たにがき けんじ
- Katakana: タニガキ ケンジ

Kenji Tanigaki (谷垣 健治, Tanigaki Kenji; born 13 October 1970) is a Japanese action choreographer, stunt performer, and film director. He is best known for his works in Hong Kong action cinema, and has expanded his career in Japanese cinema and Hollywood.

Inspired by Jackie Chan's action films, Tanigaki migrated to Hong Kong in 1993 and began his career in action choreography by collaborating with Donnie Yen in the ATV martial arts drama series Fist of Fury (1995). Since then, Tanigaki has participated in numerous Hong Kong action films, serving as a stunt coordinator in SPL: Sha Po Lang (2005), Flash Point (2007), Bodyguards and Assassins (2009), Raging Fire (2021), and Twilight of the Warriors: Walled In (2024), and as an action director in See You Tomorrow (2016), Hidden Man (2018), and Sakra (2023). Tanigaki won a Golden Horse Award for Hidden Man and two Hong Kong Film Awards for Raging Fire and Twilight of the Warriors: Walled In.

In addition to his work in Hong Kong, Tanigaki has developed careers in Japan and the United States. He had participated in the American film Blade II (2002), the Japanese films Always: Sunset on Third Street (2005), and Kamui Gaiden (2009). He gained international recognition for his work as the action director of Rurouni Kenshin (2012), and its sequels Rurouni Kenshin: Kyoto Inferno, Rurouni Kenshin: The Legend Ends (both 2014), and Rurouni Kenshin: The Final (2021). Tanigaki's international action directing credits also include the Japanese film Shinjuku Swan II (2017) and the American film Snake Eyes: G.I. Joe Origins (2021).

== Early life and education ==
Tanigaki was born on 13 October 1970 in Nara Prefecture, Japan. He had seizures at a young age and was physically weak, but Tanigaki considered that his childhood spent playing in the wild helped him develop a strong physique naturally. When he was in primary school, he watched the Hong Kong action films Snake in the Eagle's Shadow and Project A which starred Jackie Chan and became fond of Chan's action stunts and Chinese kung fu. He joined a shorinji kempo coaching school and began martial arts training while in high school, winning in a prefectural tournament. He went on a graduation trip to Hong Kong in his third year of high school, and visited Chan's filmmaking company to witness the production of the action film Miracles, sparking his interest in joining the action film industry. He returned to Japan to continue his studies at the School of Law and Politics, Kwansei Gakuin University and later graduated with a law degree. Tanigaki joined a martial arts academy formed by Hong Kong-based Japanese choreographer Yasuaki Kurata to learn karate while studying in university in 1989. During his time at the academy, he acted in films in Kyoto but did not find opportunities to utilize his martial arts skills, prompting him to seek acting roles in Hong Kong, which he considered "the center of kung fu and martial arts movies". He moved to Hong Kong alone to pursue a career in filmmaking in 1993, starting off as a cast extra and volunteered in police identity parades.

== Career ==
=== Early ventures (1994-2001) ===
When Tanigaki first arrived in Hong Kong, he contacted more than 200 film production companies seeking work as an extra, but was initially rejected by most because he could not speak Cantonese. He was approached by a talent scout in McDonald's, who offered him to play small parts on television. In 1994, Tanigaki was invited to become a stunt actor by action choreographer Stephen Tung, which included a minor role as an unnamed fighter knocked out by Chen Zhen (portrayed by Jet Li) in the martial arts film Fist of Legend, and joined the Hong Kong Stuntman Association in June. In 1995, ATV began production of the martial arts series Fist of Fury. Due to the extensive number of stunt actors required for the shoot, Donnie Yen, the lead actor of the series, sought to recruit every available stunt actor in Hong Kong and brought Tanigaki on board, where the two became acquainted on set. Since then, Tanigaki became a recurring member of the Donnie Yen Stunt Team and appeared in several films starring Yen. Tanigaki participated in the 1996 action film Once Upon a Time in Triad Society, a spin-off of the Young and Dangerous film series. He also joined Yen's newly founded production company in the same year, serving as the stunt coordinator for the action films Legend of the Wolf and Ballistic Kiss, both directed by and starring Yen.

In 1997, he received an invitation from an action director to work as a stunt coordinator in the American sci-fi film The Matrix in Los Angeles. However, due to lead actor Keanu Reeves' injury and the subsequent rescheduling of filming, both the action director and Tanigaki had to withdraw from the project before Yuen Woo-ping substituted. In 1998, Yen advised Tanigaki to return to Japan and pursue a parallel career in both Hong Kong and Japanese cinema due to limited opportunities for foreigners in Hong Kong. Tanigaki followed the advice and coordinated the Hong Kong-Japanese co-produced romance film Moonlight Express. In 1999, RTL Television in Germany produced the action series The Puma, with Yen serving as the action director and Tanigaki was brought on board as part of the crew. While working on The Puma, RTL was also filming the mystery series SK Kölsch, which had an opening for a Japanese character. Tanigaki was invited to take up the acting role and was also given the position of action director, marking his action directorial debut. In 2001, he joined his first Japanese-produced film project after receiving an invitation from Ichiese Taka, the producer of Moonlight Express, and served as a stunt actor in the horror film Gore from Outer Space. He also took part in the Japanese action film The Princess Blade in the same year.

=== Rising with Donnie Yen Stunt Team (2002-2011) ===
In 2002, Donnie Yen served as the action choreographer for the American superhero film Blade II, with Tanigaki once again joining the production as part of Donnie Yen Stunt Team. He reprised his position as a stunt coordinator in Donnie Yen's 2003 comedy horror film The Twins Effect and 2005 action film SPL: Sha Po Lang. Individually, Tanigaki took part in several V-Cinema and low-budget Japanese films, which he himself described as "forgettable" due to their lackluster or unknown nature. In 2005, he assumed the role of action director in the Japanese drama film Always: Sunset on Third Street, directed by Takashi Yamazaki, which won the Picture of the Year in the 29th Japan Academy Film Prize. The following year, he made his directorial debut in Japan with the action film Legend of Seven Monks, featuring Sonny Chiba and Yasuaki Kurata in lead roles.

In 2007, Tanigaki joined the production of the Hong Kong action film Flash Point, which was produced by and starred Yen. Yen specifically selected a crew of stunt coordinators with martial arts backgrounds, including Yan Hua, Yuji Shimomura, John Salvitti, and Tanigaki. He once again served as an action director in the Japanese action film Kung Fu Kid and horror film The Chasing Worlds. In 2009, Tanigaki participated in the Hong Kong historical action film Bodyguards and Assassins and the Hong Kong action thriller film Shinjuku Incident. He also worked on the Japanese action film Kamui Gaiden adapted from the manga series of the same title, which he described as his first large-scale Japanese project. Mark Schilling of The Japan Times complimented the fight sequences choreographed by Tanigaki, and while Andrew Skeates of Far East Films criticised the film's plot and CGI, he pointed out that the action scenes are "fluid and well-staged" with climax. From 2010 to 2011, Tanigaki was involved in the Hong Kong martial art film Legend of the Fist: The Return of Chen Zhen, a sequel to the television series Fist of Fury, as well as action films The Lost Bladesman and Wu Xia, all of which starred Yen.

=== Breakthrough with Rurouni Kenshin (2012-2019) ===
In 2012, Tanigaki served as the action director of the Japanese jidaigeki action film Rurouni Kenshin, based on the manga of the same title. Keishi Ōtomo, the film's director, was impressed by Tanigaki's stunt coordination work in Legend of the Wolf and handpicked him to join the project. Maggie Lee of Variety described the action scenes as "expertly handled" and choreographed in a "balletic, kinetic style characteristic of Hong Kong action films", owing to Tanigaki's experience in the Hong Kong action cinema, while Cinema Today commended the action sequences as being of the highest quality in Japanese cinema. Tanigaki also won Best Stunt Coordinator in the 1st Japan Action Awards for his work. South China Morning Post described Rurouni Kenshin as Tanigaki's most popular project, and Tanigaki himself acknowledged that the film generated the most response among all his projects. Tanigaki later returned as the action director for the 2014 back-to-back sequels Rurouni Kenshin: Kyoto Inferno and Rurouni Kenshin: The Legend Ends, which earned him Best Action Director in the 3rd Japan Action Awards.

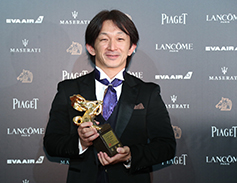
Tanigaki won Best Action Choreography in the 55th Golden Horse Awards for Hidden Man (2018).

From 2012 to 2014, Tanigaki served as an action director in Donnie Yen's action films Special ID and The Monkey King, as well as the Japanese television series SIII and historical drama series Miyamoto Musashi. In 2015, he participated in the Chinese action thriller film The Vanished Murderer, and choreographed the music video for Japanese girl group AKB48's single "Bokutachi wa Tatakawanai". In 2016, Tanigaki served as the action director for the Chinese-Hong Kong romance films Finding Mr. Right 2 and See You Tomorrow. He continued in the same role for the Chinese-Hong Kong war film God of War, Japanese crime comedy film Shinjuku Swan II, and the Chinese crime film The Liquidator in the following year. In 2018, Tanigaki took on the role of action director for the Chinese-Hong Kong fantasy adventure film Monster Hunter 2 and the Chinese action comedy film Hidden Man. Both films garnered nominations for Best Action Choreography in the 55th Golden Horse Awards and Tanigaki emerged as the winner with Hidden Man. Tanigaki collaborated with Yen as the action director for the action drama film Big Brother later in the same year.

=== Broadening opportunities (2020-present) ===
In 2020, Tanigaki co-directed the action comedy film Enter the Fat Dragon with Wong Jing, which starred Donnie Yen, alongside Niki Chow and Teresa Mo. Isaac Chambers of Far East Films praised the action scenes but criticised the plot and jokes calling them clichéd and lame, while Edmund Lee of South China Morning Post described the film as a Frankenstein monster that combines elements from classic Hong Kong movies. In 2021, Tanigaki once again assumed the role of action director for the action film Rurouni Kenshin: The Final, the fourth installment of the Rurouni Kenshin film series. Alex Rallo of Polygon acknowledged Tanigaki for bringing his "A-game to the Rurouni Kenshin saga" and delivering new cinematic kinetics that utilised camera movements to enhance the choreography. Mark Schilling of The Japan Times commended the film's battle sequences and referred to Tanigaki as the person who "brings panache and impact to these scenes that lift them above the Japanese action norm".

Tanigaki assumed the roles as action director, stunt coordinator and second unit director in the 2021 American superhero film Snake Eyes: G.I. Joe Origins. He was recommended to the film's producers by American director Chad Stahelski, who kept in contact with him after they met during a trip to Japan. Initially joining the crew as the stunt coordinator, Stahelski proposed that he also serve as the second unit director. Scott Mendelson of Forbes praised the action scenes as "hugely impressive staging, courtesy of Kenji Tanigaki", and Susan Hornick of South China Morning Post credited Tanigaki for the "truly stellar" sword choreography. The same year, Tanigaki choreographed for the Hong Kong action film Raging Fire, which earned him Best Action Choreography in the 40th Hong Kong Film Awards. Matthew Monagle of The Austin Chronicle praised Tanigaki's fight coordination as "top-tier violence", particularly highlighting a church brawl sequence and calling it the best seen in a movie that year.

Tanigaki collaborated once again with Donnie Yen in the 2022 action drama film Big Rescue and the 2023 martial arts film Sakra as the action director. The latter earned Tanigaki a nomination for Best Action Choreography in the 42nd Hong Kong Film Awards. Tanigaki took on the role as stunt coordinator in the 2024 martial arts film Twilight of the Warriors: Walled In, for which he won Best Action Choreography again in the 43rd Hong Kong Film Awards. Keith Ho, writing for HK01, noted Tanigaki's effort in choreographing with considerations of the different sets within the Kowloon Walled City, describing it as "the best Hong Kong close combat film in recent years", while Simon Abrams of RogerEbert.com called the action "thrilling" and credited Tanigaki with elevating the action to a larger scale. The film also became the most-watched Hong Kong domestic film, with a record of over 1.5 million viewers. Tanigaki also collaborated with Yen on The Prosecutor in the same year, a film directed, produced, co-choreographed and starring Yen. The stunt work was primarily coordinated by Takahito Ouchi, another Japanese member of the Donnie Yen Stunt Team, along with a stunt team from Japan. However, the production faced initial communication challenges due to language barriers, resulting in many action scenes needing to be reshot. Tanigaki was invited by Yen to assist with on-set coordination, and was credited as an action director for the film. Abrams of RogerEbert.com commended Tanigaki for his role in coordinating the "characteristically solid" action sequences. He also directed the action film The Furious, a Hong Kong-funded English-language project set in Thailand, which premiered at the 2025 Toronto International Film Festival.

Tanigaki's next directorial effort is The Reckoner, an action film for Lionsgate Films with Peter Dinklage in a starring role.

== Personal life ==
Tanigaki got married in the late 1990s and held his wedding in Japan. As of 2020, he has resided in Hong Kong for 26 years. In his award acceptance speech at the 43rd Hong Kong Film Awards ceremony, he referred to himself as a Hong Kong filmmaker. He has learnt to speak Cantonese fluently over the years, and has a basic proficiency in Mandarin. On 23 August 2026, Tanigaki announced his marriage to actress Luna Fujimoto.

== Filmography ==
=== As director ===
Year	Title	Notes
2006	Legend of Seven Monks	
2020	Enter the Fat Dragon	
2025	The Furious	
2026	The Living Dragon †	

=== As action choreographer ===
Year	Title	Stunt coordinator	Action director	Notes
1996	Once Upon a Time in Triad Society	Yes	No	
1997	Legend of the Wolf	Yes	No	
1998	Ballistic Kiss	Yes	No	
1999	Moonlight Express	Yes	No	
1999	The Puma	Yes	No	Television series
1999	SK Kölsch	No	Yes	Television series
2001	The Princess Blade	Yes	No	
2002	Blade II	Yes	No	
2003	The Twins Effect	Yes	No	
2005	SPL: Sha Po Lang	Yes	No	
2005	Always: Sunset on Third Street	No	Yes	
2007	Flash Point	Yes	No	
2007	Kung Fu Kid	No	Yes	
2008	The Chasing Worlds	No	Yes	
2009	Bodyguards and Assassins	Yes	No	
2009	Kamui Gaiden	No	Yes	
2009	Shinjuku Incident	Yes	No	
2010	Legend of the Fist: The Return of Chen Zhen	Yes	No	
2011	The Lost Bladesman	Yes	No	
2011	Wu Xia	Yes	No	
2012	Rurouni Kenshin	No	Yes	
2012	SIII	No	Yes	Television series
2013	Special ID	Yes	No	
2014	The Monkey King	Yes	No	
2014	Rurouni Kenshin: Kyoto Inferno	No	Yes	
2014	Rurouni Kenshin: The Legend Ends	No	Yes	
2014	Miyamoto Musashi	No	Yes	Television series
2015	The Vanished Murderer	No	Yes	
2016	Finding Mr. Right 2	No	Yes	
2016	See You Tomorrow	No	Yes	
2017	God of War	No	Yes	
2017	Shinjuku Swan II	No	Yes	
2017	The Liquidator	No	Yes	
2018	Monster Hunt 2	No	Yes	
2018	Hidden Man	No	Yes	
2018	Big Brother	No	Yes	
2021	Rurouni Kenshin: The Final	No	Yes	
2021	Raging Fire	Yes	No	
2021	Snake Eyes: G.I. Joe Origins	Yes	Yes	Also as second unit director
2022	Big Rescue	No	Yes	
2022	Fierce Cop	No	Yes	
2023	Sakra	No	Yes	
2024	Twilight of the Warriors: Walled In	Yes	No	
2024	The Prosecutor	No	Yes	
2026	Phantom Blade Zero †	No	Yes	Video game
TBA	Twilight of the Warriors: The Final Chapter †	Yes	No	Filming

=== Acting credits ===
Year	Title	Role	Notes
1994	Fist of Legend	Japanese fighter	
1999	SK Kölsch	Miroto	
2000	Time and Tide	Mouse (老鼠仔)	
2005	SPL: Sha Po Lang	Wong Po's bodyguard	
2006	Fatal Contact	Underground boxer	Uncredited

== Awards and nominations ==
Year	Award	Category	Work	Result	Ref.
2013	1st Japan Action Awards	Best Stunt Coordinator	Rurouni Kenshin	Won	
2015	3rd Japan Action Awards	Best Action Director	Rurouni Kenshin: Kyoto Inferno/ Rurouni Kenshin: The Legend Ends	Won	
2018	55th Golden Horse Awards	Best Action Choreography	Hidden Man	Won	
2018	55th Golden Horse Awards	Best Action Choreography	Monster Hunt 2	Nominated	
2019	2019 Taurus World Stunt Awards	Best Action in a Foreign Film	Big Brother	Nominated	
2022	2022 Taurus World Stunt Awards	Best Action in a Foreign Film	Raging Fire	Won	
2022	40th Hong Kong Film Awards	Best Action Choreography	Raging Fire	Won	
2024	42nd Hong Kong Film Awards	Best Action Choreography	Sakra	Nominated	
2024	9th Seattle Film Critics Society Awards	Best Action Choreography	Twilight of the Warriors: Walled In	Nominated	
2025	43rd Hong Kong Film Awards	Best Action Choreography	Twilight of the Warriors: Walled In	Won	
