= Donnie Yen filmography =

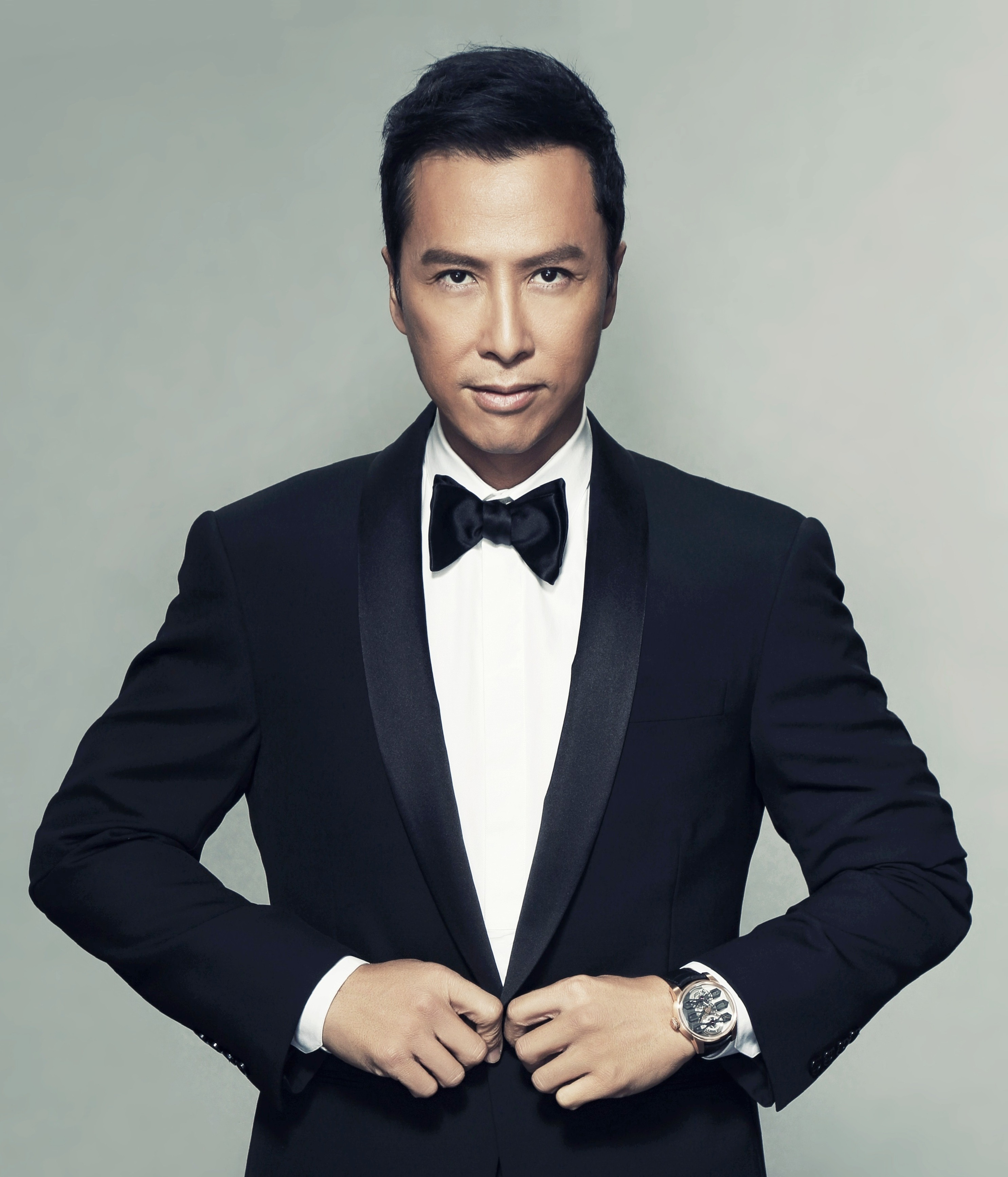
- Yen in 2018

This is the filmography of Hong Kong action choreographer, actor, film director, martial artist, and producer Donnie Yen.

== Film ==
| Year | Title | Role | Notes/Ref. |
|---|---|---|---|
| 1983 | Shaolin Drunkard | —N/a | a.k.a. Miracle Fighters 2 Stuntman |
| 1984 | Drunken Tai Chi | Ching Do | a.k.a. Drunken Tai Chi Master |
| 1985 | Mismatched Couples | Eddie | a.k.a. The Mismatched Couple |
| 1988 | Tiger Cage | Terry | Also action director |
| 1989 | In the Line of Duty 4: Witness | Captain Donnie Yan | a.k.a. In the Line of Duty a.k.a. In the Line of Duty IV: Witness a.k.a. Yes, Madam 4 |
| 1990 | Tiger Cage 2 | Dragon Yau | Also action director |
| 1991 | Holy Virgin vs. the Evil Dead | Shiang Chin-fei | |
| 1991 | Crystal Hunt | Leung / Brett Chan | |
| 1992 | Cheetah on Fire | Ronald / Ronnie / Roano | a.k.a. Fight to Survive in the Philippines |
| 1992 | Once Upon a Time in China II | Commander Lan | |
| 1992 | New Dragon Gate Inn | Eunuch Tsao | a.k.a. Dragon Inn |
| 1993 | Iron Monkey | Wong Kei-ying | a.k.a. Iron Monkey: The Young Wong Fei Hung |
| 1993 | Butterfly and Sword | Yip Cheung | a.k.a. Comet, Butterfly, and Sword |
| 1993 | Heroes Among Heroes | Beggar So Chan | a.k.a. The Red Dragon a.k.a. Beggar So |
| 1994 | Wing Chun | Leung Pok-to | a.k.a. The Beautiful Secret Agent; Also action director |
| 1994 | Circus Kid | Danton Lee | a.k.a. Circus Kids |
| 1995 | The Saint of Gamblers | Lone Seven | Cameo |
| 1995 | Asian Cop: High Voltage | Chiang Ho-wa | a.k.a. Asian Cops: High Voltage; Also action director |
| 1996 | Iron Monkey 2 | The Iron Monkey | |
| 1996 | Satan Returns | Nam | a.k.a. Satan's Return a.k.a. Shaolin vs. The Devil's Omen; Also action director |
| 1997 | Legend of the Wolf | Fung Man-hin | a.k.a. The New Big Boss; Also director, producer, action director and co-writer |
| 1997 | Black Rose II | Boxing School Owner | a.k.a. The Black Rose a.k.a. 97 Legendary La Rose Noire |
| 1998 | Ballistic Kiss | Cat | a.k.a. Kill a Little, Dance a Little; Also director, producer and action director |
| 1998 | Shanghai Affairs | Tong Shan | Also director and action director |
| 1999 | City of Darkness | Ozone | a.k.a. Black City |
| 1999 | Moonlight Express | —N/a | Action director |
| 2000 | Highlander: Endgame | Jin Ke | Also martial arts choreographer |
| 2001 | The Princess Blade | —N/a | a.k.a. Shurayuki Hime; Action choreographer |
| 2002 | Blade II | Snowman | Also action choreographer |
| 2002 | Hero | Long Sky | |
| 2003 | Shanghai Knights | Wu Chow | |
| 2003 | The Twins Effect | —N/a | a.k.a. Vampire Effect; Co-director and action director |
| 2004 | The Twins Effect II | General Lone | a.k.a. Huadu Chronicles: The Blade of the Rose |
| 2004 | Protégé de la Rose Noire | —N/a | a.k.a. Black Rose Academy; Co-director and action director |
| 2004 | Love on the Rocks | Victor Tsui | |
| 2005 | SPL: Sha Po Lang | Inspector Ma Kwan | a.k.a. Kill Zone (US); Also action director |
| 2005 | Seven Swords | Chu Zhaonan | |
| 2005 | Dragon Tiger Gate | Wong Siu-lung, a.k.a. "Dragon Wong" | Also action director and executive producer |
| 2006 | Stormbreaker | —N/a | Action director |
| 2007 | Flash Point | Inspector Ma Jun | a.k.a. Flashpoint a.k.a. City Without Mercy; Also action director and producer |
| 2008 | An Empress and the Warriors | Murong Xuehu | a.k.a. The Kingdom and a Beauty |
| 2008 | Painted Skin | Pang Yong | |
| 2008 | Ip Man | Ip Man | |
| 2009 | All's Well, Ends Well 2009 | Wedding Guest | Cameo |
| 2009 | The Founding of a Republic | Tian Han | a.k.a. Jian Guo Da Ye (lit. The Great Cause of China's Foundation) a.k.a. Founding of a Nation a.k.a. Lofty Ambitions of Nation Building |
| 2009 | Bodyguards and Assassins | Shen Chongyang | Also action director |
| 2010 | 14 Blades | Qinglong | |
| 2010 | Ip Man 2 | Ip Man | |
| 2010 | Legend of the Fist: The Return of Chen Zhen | Chen Zhen | Also action director |
| 2011 | All's Well, Ends Well 2011 | Arnold Cheng | |
| 2011 | The Lost Bladesman | Guan Yu | Also action director |
| 2011 | Dragon | Liu Jinxi / Tang Long | a.k.a. Wu Xia; Also action director |
| 2012 | All's Well, Ends Well 2012 | Carl Tam | a.k.a. Eight Happiness 2012 |
| 2013 | Together | Mr. Cool | |
| 2013 | Special ID | Dragon Chan | Also action director |
| 2014 | Golden Chicken 3 | Master Yip | |
| 2014 | The Monkey King | Sun Wukong | Also action director |
| 2014 | Iceman | Ho Ying | Also action director |
| 2014 | Kung Fu Jungle | Ha Hou-mou | Also action director |
| 2015 | An Inspector Calls | Pop Quadruplet | Cameo |
| 2015 | Ip Man 3 | Ip Man | |
| 2016 | Crouching Tiger, Hidden Dragon: Sword of Destiny | Silent Wolf | |
| 2016 | Rogue One | Chirrut Îmwe | |
| 2017 | XXX: Return of Xander Cage | Xiang | |
| 2017 | Chasing the Dragon | Crippled Ho | |
| 2017 | Gong Shou Dao | Master Yen | Short film |
| 2018 | Big Brother | Henry Chen Xia / Chan Hak | |
| 2018 | Iceman: The Time Traveller | Ho Ying | Also action director |
| 2018 | Master Z: Ip Man Legacy | —N/a | Producer |
| 2019 | Ip Man 4: The Finale | Ip Man | |
| 2020 | Enter the Fat Dragon | Fallon Zhu | Also producer |
| 2020 | Mulan | Commander Tung | |
| 2021 | Raging Fire | Cheung Sung-bong | |
| 2022 | New Kung Fu Cult Master 1 | Cheung Sam-fung | |
| 2022 | New Kung Fu Cult Master 2 | Cheung Sam-fung | |
| 2022 | Come Back Home | De | |
| 2023 | Sakra | Qiao Feng | Also director and co-producer |
| 2023 | John Wick: Chapter 4 | Caine | |
| 2024 | The Prosecutor | Fok Chi-ho | Also director and co-producer |
| TBA | Caine | Caine | Filming; Also director |

== Television ==
| Year | Title | Role | Network | Notes/Ref. |
|---|---|---|---|---|
| 1988 | The Last Conflict | Dickson Kwan | TVB | Television film |
| 1989 | Fei Fu Kwan Ying | Cheung Ho-nam | TVB | |
| 1989 | Mo Min Kap Sin Fung | Tse Kwok-tung | TVB | |
| 1991 | A New Life | Chong Ka-chun | TVB | |
| 1991 | Crime File | Dan, a.k.a. "Bomb" | TVB | |
| 1994 | The Kung Fu Master | Hung Hei-gun | ATV | Yen also sang the theme song. |
| 1995 | Fist of Fury | Chen Zhen | ATV | Yen also sang the theme song. |
| 1999 | Codename: The Puma | —N/a | RTL | Co-director and action director |

== Video games ==
| Year | Title | Role | Notes/Ref. |
|---|---|---|---|
| 2004 | Onimusha 3: Demon Siege | —N/a | CG Movie Stunt Director and Action Choreographer |
| 2026 | Phantom Blade Zero | Mó Yuan | Also as creative consultant. |
