= A New Life (Hong Kong TV series) =

1991 Hong Kong action crime drama television series

- Official poster
- 命運迷宮
- Genre: Crime drama Action
- Screenplay by: Wong Yuk-tak; Chan Siu-cheung; Tsang Po-wah; Alex Lee; Chung Ching-ling
- Directed by: Lui Sui-lun; Yung Kwok-wai; Ng Chi-kuen; Patrick Yau
- Starring: Margie Tsang; Savio Tsang; Donnie Yen; Kitty Lai; Joseph Lee; Yip Yuk-ping
- Theme music composer: Tai Chi
- Opening theme: A New Life (命運迷宮) by Tai Chi
- Country of origin: Hong Kong
- Original language: Cantonese
- No. of episodes: 15

Production
- Producer: Yeung Kam-chuen
- Production location: Hong Kong
- Camera setup: Multi camera
- Production company: TVB

Original release
- Network: TVB Jade
- Release: 1991

A New Life
- Traditional Chinese: 命運迷宮
- Simplified Chinese: 命运迷宫
- Literal meaning: "The Labyrinth of Destiny"
Transcriptions
Standard Mandarin
- Hanyu Pinyin: Mìng Yùn Mí Gōng
Yue: Cantonese
- Jyutping: Ming6 Wan6 Mai4 Gung1

A New Life is a 1991 Hong Kong action crime drama television series produced by TVB and starring Margie Tsang, Savio Tsang, Donnie Yen and Kitty Lai. Originally released overseas on 23 September 1991, the series is currently rerunning on TVB's Network Vision channel starting from 16 January 2016 on weekends as a part of the special, Our... Donnie Yen (我們的...甄子丹), that began running on 11 January 2016.

== Plot ==
Yam Chi-ho (Savio Tsang) was brought up in the triads and have been imprisoned on numerous occasions. Chi-ho was temporarily released from prison to attend his father's funeral, the police are tightly monitoring him, believing he will commit another crime, and thus, Chi-ho feels a great sense of stress. He later meets a passionate social worker, Ha Ching-man (Margie Tsang), who actively leads Chi-ho back on the right path. During one occasion, Chi-ho went to settle a dispute for his triad brother, causing his wife, Pui-kuen (Kitty Lai) to a miscarriage. Disappointed at how Chi-ho was unable to change his poor habits, Pui-kuen breaks up with him. While Chi-ho felt guilty, Ching-man comforts him and inspires him to reform.

Chi-ho's good friend, Chong Ka-chun (Donnie Yen), was a customs officer who was framed for corruption and was imprisoned as a result. After being released from jail, Ka-chun's wife, Yee-lei (Cheng Yuen-man) has been remarried to his friend, Fong Sai-hei (Felix Lok). However, Ka-chun discovers that Sai-hei was the one who framed him. Sai-hei kills Ka-chun's son and causes Yee-lei to go mad. To seek revenge, Ka-chun joins the triads and participates in smuggling activities. Ka-chun also forces his good friend, Ma Cheung (Joseph Lee), an ex-con and expert lock picker who planned to turn over a new life, to conspire with him. Cheung, who is raising money to marry his girlfriend, Suk-lan (Yip Yuk-ping), has no choice but to agree. Ka-chun unscrupulously climbs up in the triads, launching a series of slaughters, and leading Sai-hei to prison. Ka-chun also murders Ching-man's mother, which was witnessed by Cheung. When Ka-chun plans to silence Cheung, Chi-ho helps Cheung in countering against Ka-chun.

== Cast ==
- Margie Tsang as Ha Ching-man (夏靜雯)
- Savio Tsang as Yam Chi-ho (任志豪)
- Donnie Yen as Chong Ka-chun (莊家俊)
- Kitty Lai as Chan Pui-kuen (陳佩娟)
- Joseph Lee as Ma Cheung (馬祥)
- Yip Yuk-ping as Ho Suk-lan (何淑蘭)
- Felix Lok as Fong Sai-hei (方世希)
- Wong Chi-chung as Cheung Po-fat (張寶發)
- Chiu Hung as Yeung Kwok-piu (楊國標)
- Chan Wing-chun as Hui Lap-pong (許立邦)
- Fung Sui-chun as Grandma (阿嫲)
- Kong Ming-fai as Chan Siu-ping (陳少炳)
- Dick Chan as Mad Kwan (喪坤)
- Cheng Lui as Cheng Kwong (鄭廣)
- Helen Ma as Tsui Wai-chu (徐惠珠)
- Sophie Ngan as Lai (阿麗)
- Wong Sze-yan as worker
- Daniel Kwok as C.I.D.
- Cheung Pak-yin as C.I.D.
- Chan Chung-king as Director Mak (麥主任)
- Yik Tin-hung as Monkey (馬騮)
- Pok Kwan as Kwong (阿光)
- Leung Kin-ping as supervisor
- Cheung Chun-wah as Welfare officer
- Wong Wai-leung as Convict A
- Lau Wai-chuen as Convict B
- Au Ngok as Uncle Kin (堅叔)
- Sit Chun as Chi-ho's father
- Mak Ho-wai as Ha Kin-yan (夏健仁)
- Chan Min-leung as Drug addict Chuen (道友全)
- Cheng Yuen-man as Chow Yee-lei (周綺莉)
- Choi Yan-yan as Kitty
- Lee Kwai-ying as Pretty girl
- Wong Wai-lam as Wing (阿榮)
- Hui Chi-kai as Po (阿波)
- Yau Piu as Handsome Ping (靚仔平)
- Wong Man-piu as Keung's underling
- Shek Wan as Factory boss
- Chan Wai-yu as Miss Cheung (祥姑娘)
- Cheng Ka-sang as Big Mouth Keung (大口強)
- Choi Chai as Chong Ka-ming (莊家明)
- Shally Tsang as Ng Mei-yan (吳美茵)
- Steve Lee as Brother Hung (大哥雄)
- Ricky Lee as Sai-wah (細華)
- Samantha Chuk as Cindy
- Tang Yu-chiu as Kwong's underling
- Ha Yin-seung as Lap-pong's girlfriend
- Tang Hin-wing as Man in tuxedo
- Ying Sin-yin as Sai-hei's underling
- Tai Siu-man as Sai-hei's underling
- Ma Kin-chung as News reporter
- Wong Kin-fung as Kwong's underling
- Tam Yat-ching as Fok Tung-cheung (霍東昌)
- Fung Man-ching as Fok Yuen-yee (霍婉儀)
- Lee Hoi-sang as Heung Tung (向東)
- Leung Yam-kei as Tung's underling
- Wong Fai-keung as Tung-cheung's underling
- Mak Ka-lun as Ka-chung's underling
- To Pak-ming as Tung's underling
- Chan Chun-lok as Tung's underling
- Yuen Wai-kit as Kwan's underling
- Chan Yin-hong as Office staff
- Tam Suk-mui as Office staff
- Kong Ho-cheung as C.I.D.
- Wai Tak-sing as C.I.D.
- Ho Chiu-kit as Ka-chun's underling
- Lam To-kuen as Ka-chun's underling

== See also ==
- Donnie Yen filmography
