= Ballistic Kiss =

1998 Hong Kong film by Donnie Yen

- Film poster
- Traditional Chinese: 殺殺人、跳跳舞
- Simplified Chinese: 杀杀人，跳跳舞
- Hanyu Pinyin: Shā Shā Rén, Tiào Tiào Wǔ
- Jyutping: Saat3 Saat3 Jan4, Tiu3 Tiu3 Mou2
- Directed by: Donnie Yen
- Written by: Bey Logan
- Produced by: Donnie Yen
- Starring: Donnie Yen; Annie Wu; Jimmy Wong; Simon Lui; Yu Rongguang
- Cinematography: Ally Wong; Kwan Chi-kan; Stephen Poon
- Edited by: Chan Kan-sing
- Music by: Yukie Nishimura
- Production company: Bullet Films
- Distributed by: Golden Harvest
- Release date: 21 March 1998
- Running time: 90 minutes
- Country: Hong Kong
- Languages: Cantonese; Mandarin; English
- Box office: HK$853,735

Ballistic Kiss is a 1998 Hong Kong action film starring and directed by Donnie Yen, who also produced. The film co-stars Annie Wu, Jimmy Wong, Simon Lui, and Yu Rongguang.

== Plot ==
Cat (Donnie Yen) is an aimless contract killer, no matter if its raining or sunny, he would always wear dark glasses and always call DJ Simon's radio show to talk. Every night, he looks out the window to see his angel living across him, which he would then practice slow dancing, while imagining he is dancing with his angel. Policewoman Carrie (Annie Wu) also listens to the radio every night, often listening to Cat's calls. Carrie's goal is to also arrest the aimless killer. When Cat is heading to a contractor's place, he spots Carrie waiting for a bus and speaks to her. They sit together on the bus and Cat tells Carrie that they will meet again. When Cat gets to the contractor's place, he agrees to do one last job and is assigned to assassinate Conroy Chan. The contractor tells Cat that Wesley (Jimmy Wong) will be guarding him along with other guards. Wesley was Cat's old partner when they were cops in New York, but Wesley had framed Cat and sent him to prison for 6 years. Cat kills Conroy and Wesley runs into Cat. Cat confronts him then shoots him in the chest multiple times. Wesley survives because of his bulletproof vest and is taken in for questioning by the police. Wesley tells them that he does not know what happened or who the killer was and Carrie becomes suspicious.

When Cat tries to shoot Wesley with a sniper, he sees Carrie talking to him and thinks Carrie is Wesley's girlfriend and abducts her. He keeps her in his house and she is surprised to find out that Cat lives and has been watching her from across her home. Wesley calls Cat's phone and Cat agrees to do an exchange at a theater. Going through a theater with a hail of bullets, Cat gives Carrie a gun and tells her that she's helped him enough and she can go now. When Cat is found by Wesley's guys, Carrie helps Cat shoot them with the gun he gave her. They head home and Cat is surprised to discover that Carrie is the policewoman who has been on his trail. Carrie figures out that Cat is the man on the radio and confronts him which leads to an argument. After the argument they have an affectionate moment hugging each other.

On the other hand, Wesley captures Carrie's dear friend and tells her to kill Cat in order to save her friend. Carrie points the gun at Cat and decides not to kill him, they are then interrupted by a hitman hired by a contractor to kill Cat. Cat ends up killing the hitman. Afterwards, Cat and Carrie slow dances on the rooftop and Cat tells Carrie he will save her friend and leaves Carrie stranded on the roof top alone.

When Carrie escapes, she goes to DJ Simon's office to listen to Cat's call, where he talks about where he is headed. Carrie figures out where Cat is located and brings other police with her. Meanwhile, Cat kills Wesley and saves Carrie's friend. Carrie enters the building and sees Cat in critical condition and exits the building with him. The policemen end up shooting Cat leading to his death and Carrie is devastated. The film ends with Carrie visiting Cat's grave.

== Cast ==
- Donnie Yen as Cat Lee
- Annie Wu as Carrie
- Jimmy Wong as Wesley
- Simon Lui as DJ Simon
- Yu Rongguang as Hitman (cameo)
- Vincent Kok
- Lily Chow as Lily
- Karen Tong
- Felix Lok
- John Hau
- Conroy Chan
- Michael Woods
- Vincent Ngan
- Andrew Chan as thug
- Mak Wai-cheung
- Ng Kin-kwok
- Kellog Kwok
- Ivan Wong as thug
- Pinky Yau
- Sam Ho as Bodyguard
- Kenji Tanigaki
- Lam Kwok-kit
- Law Wai-kai as thug
- Hon Ping
- Ippongi Bang

== Box office ==
The film grossed HK$853,735 at the Hong Kong box office during its theatrical run from 21 to 27 March 1998 in Hong Kong.

== See also ==
- Donnie Yen filmography
