= Mo Min Kap Sin Fung =

Hong Kong television series

- Official poster
- Also known as: File Noir
- 無冕急先鋒
- Genre: Crime thriller Action
- Screenplay by: Kong Hueng-sang; Cheng Yau-hing; Lee King-wah; Chan Tat-yee; Yeung Chung-pak; Ka Wai-nam
- Directed by: Lee Ting-lun; Lee Kwok-lap; Wong Yau-chuen; Tin Tik-hang; Ng Chun-chau
- Starring: David Siu; Kitty Lai; Donnie Yen; Francis Ng; Cecilia Yiu; Flora Cheng
- Theme music composer: Michael Lai
- Opening theme: Dark Night (暗夜) by Alex To
- Country of origin: Hong Kong
- Original language: Cantonese
- No. of episodes: 20

Production
- Producer: Lee Ting-lun
- Production location: Hong Kong
- Camera setup: Multi camera
- Production company: TVB

Original release
- Network: TVB Jade
- Release: 1 May – 26 May 1989

Mo Min Kap Sin Fung
- Traditional Chinese: 無冕急先鋒
- Simplified Chinese: 无冕急先锋
- Literal meaning: "Uncrowned Vanguard"
Transcriptions
Standard Mandarin
- Hanyu Pinyin: Wú Miǎn Jí Xiān Fēng
Yue: Cantonese
- Jyutping: Mou4 Min5 Gap1 Sin1 Fung1

Mou Min Kap Sin Fung, also known by its alternative title File Noir, is a 1989 Hong Kong action crime thriller television series produced by TVB and starring David Siu, Kitty Lai, Donnie Yen and Francis Ng. Originally released overseas in September 1988 and aired from 1 to 26 May 1989 on TVB Jade, the series reran on TVB's Network Vision channel from 25 January to 29 February 2016 as a part of the special, Our... Donnie Yen (我們的...甄子丹), that began running on 11 January 2016.

== Plot ==
While investigating a tanker explosion case, news reporter Hau Man-wan (David Siu) suspects it as scheme for Au Chi-ho's (Kenneth Tsang) consortium to deceive insurance money. Man-wan uses his relationship with Au's daughter, Man-ching (Frances Lau), to get close to Au, hoping to find out the truth. Au is fiercely ambitious and in order for him to expand his influence, he resorts to ruses to annex the force of his opponents and uses Man-wan to gather criminal evidence to put his opponents in jail.

At this time, Man-wan's good friend, police inspector Tse Kwok-tung (Donnie Yen), whose girlfriend, Candy, was recently murdered, suspects the culprit behind this case to be Au's underling, Lee Long (Francis Ng). Kwok-tung decides to closely investigate this with his old partner, sergeant Lee Fan (Ng Man-tat). However, Kwok-tung was framed while investigating and was transferred to another department, with female inspector Hung Wai-ling (Kitty Lai) takes over his duties. Wai-ling is Man-wan's girlfriend who opposes her boyfriend to investigate Au, while also prevents Fan from helping Kwok-tung. As a result, Fan is highly dissatisfied with his new superior and often gets into conflicts with her, giving little development the investigation. Later, Wan-wan decides to put his life at risk and go undercover into Au's organization in order to find out the truth, hoping to assist Kwok-tung and Fan on the investigation.

== Cast ==
- David Siu as Hau Man-wan (侯萬雲)
- Kitty Lai as Hung Wai-ling (洪惠玲)
- Donnie Yen as Tse Kwok-tung (謝國棟)
- Francis Ng as Lee Long (李朗)
- Cecilia Yiu as Ruby
- Flora Cheng as Hau Ying-ying (侯瑩瑩)
- Pau Fong as Lung Sei (龍四)
- Lai Koon-sing as Lok Kam (駱淦)
- Frances Lau as Au Man-ching (歐曼菁)
- Stephen Chow as Cheung Ka-shu (張家樹)
- Cheung Yik-ming
- Lau On-kei
- Felix Lok as Keung Ning (姜寧)
- Fong Wai-ming
- Law Kwok-wai as Ho Sam (何森)
- Wong Sze-yan as Tai-mung Sing (大懵成)
- Lee Yeung-to as Siu-fai (小輝)
- Hui Yat-wah as Chu (珠女)
- Wong Wai-tak as Keung (阿強)
- Wayne Lai as Ming (阿明)
- Yip Seung-wah as Sin Chi-kuen (冼志權)
- Ng Man-tat as Lee Fan (李凡)
- Choi Wan
- Yeung Chi-to
- Sher Ng as Wan Ho-yan (雲可茵)
- Wong Chung-chi
- Leung Suk-yee
- Mok Yee-lun
- Mak Chi-wan as Mad Bill (喪彪)
- Ailen Sit
- Tsang Wai-suet
- Ma Wai-ling
- Ting Wing-ka
- Ng Wah-san
- Pau Wai-leung
- Leung Ying-wai
- So Han-sang
- Kenneth Tsang as Au Koon-ho (歐冠豪)
- Ng Pok-kwan
- Raymond Tsang
- Lee Kwok-ping
- Ng Kai-ming as Sin Chi-mau (冼志謀)
- Lau Siu-ming as Lee Chun-kwok (李鎮國)
- Ling Hon
- Yu Mo-lin
- Lee Wong-sang
- Cheung Chi-keung
- Yvonne Lam as Sze Suet-fong (師雪芳)
- Tsui Kwong-lam
- Derek Kok
- Tsui Po-lun
- Yip Sai-kuen
- Mui Lan
- Keung Wai-nam
- Ho Kwai-lam as Mr. Ohno (大野先生)
- Yue Ming
- Chow Tin-tak
- Hon Chun
- Wan Lai-yin
- Leung Oi
- Evergreen Mak as Billy (Billy仔)
- Lam Ka-lai
- Cutie Mui as Winnie
- Cheung Suen-mei
- Pui Wan
- Ma Hing-sang
- Yeun Chung-yee
- Frankie Lam as John
- Kong Ming-fai as Ken
- Leung Kin-ping as Lawyer Chan (陳律師)
- Tam Yat-ching
- Andy Tai as Luk Hong-kai (陸鴻楷)
- So Pui-san
- Kong Ning
- Tam Hing-chuen as Stephen
- Yeung Yim-tong as Frog (田雞)
- Yip Pik-wan
- Chin Pak-kong
- Yeung Kai-fong
- Hui Sat-yin
- Lam Kin-fai
- Chung Chi-hung
- Yue Chi-wai
- Alan Chan
- Cho Tak-kin
- Wong Mei-wah
- Chiu Hung
- Chan Ka-pik
- Suen Kwai-hing
- Lai Pik-man
- Brian Wong
- Tin Chi-yee
- To Siu-lut
- Chun Cheuk-fan

== See also ==
- Donnie Yen filmography
- List of TVB series (1989)
