= Cissy Wang =

Hong Kong model (born 1981)

- 汪詩詩
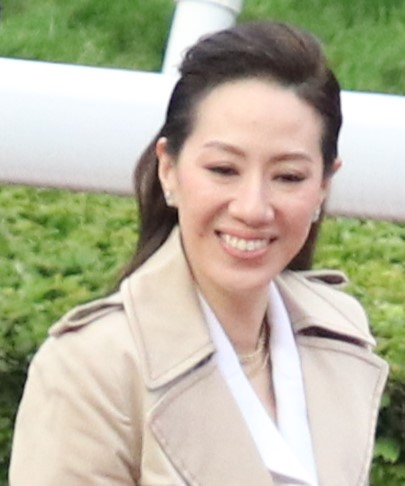
- Wang attending the Hong Kong Derby 2023 raceday at the Sha Tin Racecourse on 19 March 2023
- Born: Wang Shi Shi; 21 April 1981 (age 44); British Hong Kong
- Other names: Cecilia Wang
- Occupations: Model; artiste manager
- Years active: 1999–present
- Spouse: Donnie Yen (m. 2003)
- Children: 2
- Relatives: Irene Wang (sister)
- Modeling information
- Height: 1.81 m (5 ft 11 in)
- Hair color: Black
- Eye color: Dark brown

Chinese name
- Traditional Chinese: 汪詩詩
- Simplified Chinese: 汪诗诗
Transcriptions
Standard Mandarin
- Hanyu Pinyin: Wāng Shīshī
Yue: Cantonese
- Jyutping: Wong^{1} Si^{1} Si^{1}
- Website: Cissy Wang on Facebook

Cecilia Wang Shi Shi (Chinese: 汪詩詩; pinyin: Wāng Shīshī; born 21 April 1981), also known as Cissy Wang, is a Hong Kong model who was crowned Miss Chinese Toronto in 2000. She is married to Donnie Yen.

== Early life ==
Wang was born in Hong Kong on 21 April 1981. Her parents were in the jewelry business. She has a younger sister named Irene Wang Yuen Yuen (汪圓圓). They spent their childhood in Lima, Peru before moving to Canada. Wang speaks Cantonese, Mandarin Chinese, English, Spanish, and French.

== Career ==
Wang was a contestant in the Fairchild TV Miss Chinese Toronto Pageant at Toronto in 2000 and won first place. She was also awarded the Miss Photogenic, Most Talented Award, and Best Posture Award. She is the co-founder of Super Bullet Pictures and has been the manager of her husband Donnie Yen.

== Personal life ==
On 30 August 2003, Wang married Donnie Yen. They have two children: a daughter named Jasmine Yen (甄濟如), and a son named James Yen (甄濟嘉).
