= Master of Thunder =

- Master of Thunder cover
- Directed by: Kenji Tanigaki
- Written by: Kenji Tanigaki, Mao Aoki
- Produced by: Shigeyuki Yasumura, Masato Onishi, Nana Kurata
- Starring: Sonny Chiba, Yasuaki Kurata, Ayumi Kinoshita
- Cinematography: Ryo Serizawa
- Edited by: Daisuke Yoshimoto
- Music by: Koji Kikkawa, Tokusatsu
- Distributed by: Amuse Soft Entertainment
- Release date: 2006
- Running time: 92 minutes
- Country: Japan
- Language: Japanese

Master of Thunder, also known as Legend of Seven Monks or Master of Thunder: Kessen!! Fuuma ryuuko-den (マスター・オブ・サンダー 決戦!! 封魔龍虎伝), is a 2006 Japanese martial-arts film directed by Kenji Tanigaki and starring Sonny Chiba.

== Plot ==
For 1400 years, Spiritual Guardians have watched over the mountains of Japan and defeated the evil spirits there. The nearby Kikyo Temple is rumored to have been the home of these legendary Guardians known as the "Blue Seven Dragons." Only two survivors of the long battle between good and evil remain, the martial monks Santoku (Yasuaki Kurata) & Genryu (Sonny Chiba). Now the fate of the world must be decided once and for all in a final ferocious battle between the force of good and evil.
