= Ippongi Bang =

Japanese manga artist (born 1965)

- Born: Mari Yabunaka; January 4, 1965 (age 61)
- Known for: Manga artist
- Website: www.gainax.co.jp/hills/bang/index-e.html

Ippongi Bang (一本木 蛮, Ippongi Ban; born January 4, 1965) is a multimedia and manga artist. She has been called "one of the most well-known manga artists in America in the mid-1990s."

== Life and career ==
Ippongi was born in Yokohama City, and attended Den-En Chofu Hikiba High School, then Tamagawa University Dept. of Agriculture, and worked on a farm. She made her manga debut as a schoolgirl in 1983 with Bang's Campus Diary in the cult magazine Fanroad. The manga depicted semi-autobiographical details from her life, including her experiences at the agricultural college. As she progressed in her career, she became known as a flamboyant personality who was involved in bikini modeling, cosplay and dressing as manga characters such as Rumiko Takahashi's Lum.

Along with several friends, she started up a manga collective called "Studio Do-Do" and several of their works were translated and published in the United States in the 1990s by Antarctic Press. Ippongi, who had once been an exchange student in the United States and was familiar with the American scene, came to American conventions to promote her work. After Antarctic Press stopped publishing manga in the mid-1990s, Ippongi's works such as Virtual Bang, Doctor! and Bang's Sexplosion were published in the United States by Studio Ironcat but when Ippongi contact at the studio, co-founder Kuni Kimura left under a cloud in 1999, translation of her work for the American market ceased.

Ippongi married in 1996 and although she has published little professional work since 2000, she did release a book in 2008, Fight, Okusan! Infertility Boogie (戦え奥さん!!不妊症ブギ, Tatakae Okusan! Funinshô Boogie) (ISBN 4778035011), a volume of comics about infertility.

== Works ==
Her published works include:

- The Hero Kojiro 2, 3 volumes (Ennix Manga)
- All Around Ippongi Bang, photo collection and video (MOVIC)
- Hong Kong Video Castle, 3 volumes (Shogakukan; Planning, Production and Publishing by Yuuki Hiroshi and Co.)
- Manga Empress of All the Asias: The Dynamic Ippongi Bang CD-ROM art and cosplay photo collection CD-ROM (Gainax)
- Dark Tales of Daily Horror (変さまの日常暗黒綺譚) originally published as a 40 page omnibus on Jitsuwa Kyōfu Comic

She has appeared in several films and direct-to-video adult movies, including the ExorSister series directed by Takao Nakano where she played Maria Cruel, the ExorSister:

- Chō-yōma densetsu Uratsuki-dōji: Makai gakuen-hen (1994) (aka. ExorSister 1)
- Chō-yōma densetsu Uratsuki-dōji: Hakui jigoku-hen (1994) (aka. ExorSister 2)
- Chō-yōma densetsu Uratsuki-dōji: Joyō Senmenki-hen (1994) (aka. ExorSister 3)
- Chō-yōma densetsu Uratsuki-dōji: Daiishin fukkatsu-hen (1994) (aka. ExorSister 4)
- Ballistic Kiss (1998) (殺殺人、跳跳舞)
