= Irene Wang =

Hong Kong model and actress

- 汪圓圓
- Born: Wang Yuen Yuen; March 27, 1986 (age 40); Lima, Peru
- Other names: Irene Wong Yun-Yun, Wong Yun-Yun
- Education: McMaster University; Shanghai Theatre Academy
- Occupations: Actress; model
- Years active: 2007–present
- Height: 1.73 m (5 ft 8 in)
- Spouse: Karson Choi (m. 2013)
- Children: 3
- Parents: Daniel Wang (father); Jennifer Wang (mother)
- Relatives: Cissy Wang (sister)

Chinese name
- Traditional Chinese: 汪圓圓
- Simplified Chinese: 汪圆圆
Transcriptions
Standard Mandarin
- Hanyu Pinyin: Wāng Yuányuán
Yue: Cantonese
- Jyutping: Wong^{1} Jyun^{4} Jyun^{4}
- Website: yuenyuen.asia

Irene Wang Yuen Yuen (born March 27, 1986) is a Hong Kong model and actress. Wang was known for her roles in the films Flash Point and The Monkey King.

== Early life ==
Wang was born as Wang Yuen Yuen in Lima, Peru on 27 March 1986. Wang's mother is Jennifer Wang. Wang's father Daniel Wang ran a jewelry business there before moving to Canada. There her father was nicknamed as the "King of Diamonds" (鑽石大王) and Wang and her sister Cissy Wang were known as "Diamond Ladies" (鑽石名媛). Wang began her entertainment career at the age of 12.

== Education ==
Wang studied Business Administration at McMaster University in Ontario and graduated from the Shanghai Theatre Academy to become an actress.

== Career ==
Like her elder sister Cissy, her main work is as a model. In 2002, Wang began her television acting career in Wind and Cloud. In 2007, Wang debuted her film in Flash Point.

== Personal life ==
In 2011, Wang first met Karson Choi, the son of the King of Toys Francis Choi, through the introduction by friends. In 2013, Wang married Karson Choi at Beas River Country Club in Hong Kong. Wang's wedding wardrobe was designed by Cecilia Yau, a Hong Kong fashion designer.

Wang has one daughter Celine (born in 2014), and twin sons, Christian and Kameron (born in 2016).

== Filmography ==
=== Films ===
Year	Title	Role	Notes/Ref.
2007	Flash Point	Cindy	
2011	All's Well, Ends Well 2011	Jodi	
2012	Painted Skin: The Resurrection	writer	
2014	The Monkey King	Fairy Caiyun	

=== Television dramas ===
Year	Title	Role	Network	Notes/Ref.
2002	Wind and Cloud (风云)		China Television	
2003	Life Begins at Forty (花樣中年)	Wong Wai	TVB	
2011	Xue Liang Jun Dao (雪亮军刀)			
