= Flash Point (film) =

2007 Hong Kong film by Wilson Yip

- Hong Kong film poster

Chinese name
- Traditional Chinese: 導火綫
- Simplified Chinese: 导火线
Transcriptions
Standard Mandarin
- Hanyu Pinyin: Dǎo Huǒ Xiàn
Yue: Cantonese
- Jyutping: Dou6 Fo2 Sin3
- Directed by: Wilson Yip
- Written by: Szeto Kam-Yuen; Nicholl Tang
- Produced by: Liu Li-juan; Shan Dong-bing; Nansun Shi; Donnie Yen; Zhang Zhao
- Starring: Donnie Yen; Louis Koo; Collin Chou; Lui Leung-wai; Fan Bingbing; Xing Yu
- Cinematography: Cheung Man-po
- Edited by: Cheung Ka-fai
- Music by: Chan Kwong-wing
- Distributed by: Mandarin Films Distribution Co. Ltd.
- Release dates: 26 July 2007 (Hong Kong); 9 August 2007 (China)
- Running time: 88 minutes
- Country: Hong Kong
- Language: Cantonese
- Budget: HK$50,000,000

Flash Point (traditional Chinese: 導火綫; simplified Chinese: 导火线) is a 2007 Hong Kong action film directed by Wilson Yip and written by Szeto Kam-Yuen and Nicholl Tang. It stars Donnie Yen, Shan Dong-bing, Nansun Shi and Zhang Zhao, alongside Louis Koo, Collin Chou, Lui Leung-wai, Fan Bingbing and Xing Yu. Yen plays Ma Jun, a police sergeant who plants his partner Wilson (Louis Koo) as a mole in a pursuit against a triad led by three Vietnamese brothers (played by Chou, Lui and Xing).

Flash Point was repeatedly hailed as a prequel to the 2005 film SPL: Sha Po Lang, which was Yip and Yen's first feature film collaboration as director and star respectively. Yen denied the SPL prequel reports, stating that Flash Point was a completely original film. Principal photography began in Hong Kong from November 2006 to March 2007. In choreographing Flash Point's major fight scenes, Yen relied on the use of mixed martial arts, working alongside an international group of martial artists. His work as a choreographer won him "Best Action Choreography" awards at the 27th Hong Kong Film Awards and the 2008 Golden Horse Film Awards.

Flash Point was released in Hong Kong on 26 July 2007 and in China on 9 August 2007. It was a box office hit during its two-month theatrical run in China, despite receiving mixed reviews. It had also premiered at the "Midnight Madness" program of the 2007 Toronto International Film Festival. Flash Point was later given a limited theatrical release in North America on 14 March 2008, before being released on DVD by The Weinstein Company as part of Dragon Dynasty's collection of films.

== Plot ==
Set in pre-1997, before the return of Hong Kong to the People's Republic of China, the film opens with brothers Archer, Tony and Tiger discussing a drug deal with Sam, a rival gang leader. Ma Jun, a serious criminal investigations detective (who has been reprimanded for frequently inflicting injury on suspects), along with his team, raids the nightclub for investigation, and winds up fighting against his partner, Wilson, who has been planted as a mole.

The three brothers are later confronted by Sam and his gang, who are impatient over receiving the drugs from the brothers' native Vietnam, but they are kept at bay with violence and intimidation. The brothers later threaten the elder leaders of their gang, when they attempt to intervene. Tiger is later assigned to kill Sam in his car, but the plan fails when Wilson intervenes. While in hospital, Sam agrees to testify in court against the three brothers. On the night of their mother's birthday, the brothers plan to recover their drug money, but as they are doing so, Archer is arrested by Hong Kong police, while Tony and Tiger discover that Wilson is a mole and attempt to get rid of him. While in court, Archer is forced to turn in all of his travel documents, which will prevent him from fleeing Hong Kong before his hearing.

Three months later, Tiger and Tony brutally murder Sam along with several other witnesses and crime figures crucial to the police investigation. They attempt again to kill Wilson, delivering a bomb which kills inspector Wong and injures Wilson's pregnant girlfriend, Judy, but fails to harm Wilson. Tony and Tiger then disguise themselves as janitors to sneak into the hospital where he is being protected by the police. Ma and Tiger both end up in the same elevator and Tiger attempts to kill Wilson with a silenced pistol once he appears, but Ma is aware of him and at the last moment engages him in a fierce struggle. After being disarmed, Tiger attempts to escape, but Ma gives chase until he corners him at an outdoor restaurant. Tiger uses a little girl as a hostage and then severely injures her by throwing her through the air onto the concrete. Ma furiously engages him in combat and beats him to death in front of the crowd. Tony, having kidnapped Judy from the hospital, threatens to kill her if Wilson, now a sole witness, testifies in court. During the court hearing, Wilson refuses to testify, and the case is dismissed for lack of evidence. Wilson later attempts to rescue Judy, but is captured by Tony and his gang.

Once Archer walks free, Ma captures him and calls Tony for an exchange of hostages, leading to a confrontation in an abandoned village. Ma rescues Wilson and Judy, then single-handedly takes on the remaining gangsters, killing most of them with his revolver and a commandeered sniper rifle. Wilson returns to assist him and helps to subdue Archer. Ma corners Tony and, having exhausted his ammunition, engages him in a grueling hand-to-hand fight, eventually strangling him to unconsciousness in order to finally arrest him.

== Cast ==
- Donnie Yen as Detective Sergeant Ma Jun
- Louis Koo as Wilson
- Collin Chou as Tony
- Ray Lui as Archer Sin
- Fan Bingbing as Judy
- Xing Yu as Tiger
- Kent Cheng as Inspector Wong
- Xu Qing as Madam Lau
- Teresa Ha as Tony's mother
- Law Lan as Ma Jun's mother
- Tony Ho as Cannon
- Irene Wang as Cindy
- Timmy Hung as Yeung
- Liang Zhenhui as Deco
- Ben Lam as Sam
- Austin Wai as Four Eyes
- Wilson Tsui as Hero
- Huang Zhiwei as Baldy
- Kenji Tanigaki as Kenji
- Yu Kang as Tony's underling
- Damian Green as Boxer No. 1
- Damon Howe as Boxer No. 2
- Min Yoo as Boxer No. 3
- Drafus Chow as Boxer No. 4
- Dus Luu as Boxer No. 5
- Zen Berimbau as Boxing trainer
- Shimomura Yuji as Sniper
- Fanny Lee as Four Eyes' wife
- Siu Hung as Beach swimmer
- Victy Wong as Cop
- Kam Loi-kwan as Fatso
- Chang Kin-yung as Senior police officer
- Sherwin Ming as Little girl's father

== Production ==
Flash Point marks the third feature film collaboration of director Wilson Yip and actor Donnie Yen after 2005's SPL: Sha Po Lang and 2006's Dragon Tiger Gate. Yen also served as a fight choreographer, in addition to producing the film with Nansun Shi. The film was co-written by Szeto Kam-Yuen, who also co-wrote the script for SPL. Flash Point was executive produced by Raymond Wong, whose production company, Mandarin Films Ltd., served as a producer and distributor in Hong Kong.

=== Development ===
While Dragon Tiger Gate was in post-production, Donnie Yen had announced that plans for a sequel to SPL: Sha Po Lang had already begun, with Mandarin Films set to finance the film. Production was planned to begin in May or June 2006. Yen and his management company later clarified that the team behind SPL would be working together again on a new film, but due to copyright issues, they would not be making a sequel to the 2005 film. Yen lobbied for an American-based studio to co-produce the new film, tentatively known SPL 2, with Mandarin Films. With financing from abroad, Wilson Yip and Donnie Yen decided to raise the budget of the film to HK$50 million. Yip reportedly intended to have Aaron Kwok join the cast, but Kwok declined the role and Louis Koo had already agreed to join the cast. With Yen and Koo now cast as the lead actors, Yen and Yip had also pondered on their supporting cast for the film, even with an incomplete script. Zhang Jingchu and Rene Liu were considered as female leads.

Following the box office success of Dragon Tiger Gate, Yen had announced SPL 2's development, along with plans to make a sequel to Dragon Tiger Gate. SPL 2 was now given another tentative title, Battling the Police Force (强战型警), and Yen also announced that the film would be written in a style similar to SPL. Yen had hoped the film would take part in the 2007 Cannes Film Festival and scheduled for a Labour Day release in 2007.

The film was later retitled to Army Breaker (破军), which means destroying thousands of opponents in war. The film was given a budget of US$8 million and production was set to begin in Macau in September 2006.

=== Filming ===
The film was now given the working title City Without Mercy, and director Wilson Yip was forced to drop plans of shooting in Macau, due to the lack of extras needed for filming. Yip needed 250 extras for one scene, and decided to return to Hong Kong with his crew for filming. Filming in Hong Kong began on 13 November 2006, and the cast for the film had been finalised. Filming finally ended in March, and the film was now given its former title, Flash Point (導火線). After filming, it was revealed that the film had gone over budget. According to reports, Koo received HK$3 million, Yen received HK$2.6 million, Collin Chou received HK$1.1 million, while Xing Yu received HK$500,000 for the film.

=== Fight choreography ===
The fight scenes were choreographed by Yen, who combined mixed martial arts, an interdisciplinary form of fighting using elements of Brazilian jiu-jitsu, judo, karate, boxing, kickboxing and wrestling, with his trademark wushu and taekwondo. This method of fighting is something Yen considers to be the greatest development of martial arts in his lifetime. Yen admits that his challenge during filming was to communicate the essence of these techniques in the dramatics of the film. To ensure that the action scenes stood out, Yen not only hired martial artists from around the globe but also invited Collin Chou to join the cast.

== Festivals ==
A promotional video highlighting Flash Point was shown at the 2007 Cannes Film Festival and the 2007 Hong Kong Film Awards. It also premiered at the "Midnight Madness" program of the 2007 Toronto International Film Festival in September that same year, at the Ryerson Theatre, with director Wilson Yip attending the premiere.

=== Awards ===
Award	Category	Winner/Nominee	Result
27th Hong Kong Film Awards	Best Action Choreography	Donnie Yen	Won
27th Hong Kong Film Awards	Best Sound Design	Steve Burgess, Sam Wong	Nominated
44th Golden Horse Film Awards	Best Action Choreography	Donnie Yen	Won
44th Golden Horse Film Awards	Best Sound Design	Steve Burgess, Sam Wong	Nominated

== Reception ==
=== Box office ===
Flash Point opened in Hong Kong on 26 July 2007 and in China on 9 August 2007. In mainland China, Flash Point grossed a total of RMB15 million (US$1.98 million) in its first three days of release, according to its Hong Kong production and sales house Mandarin Films. While in Hong Kong, it grossed over HK$3.67 million (US$470,047) on its opening weekend. At the end of its box office run in Hong Kong, the film had grossed a total of over HK$10 million.

== Distribution ==
South African film distributor Distant Horizon acquired North American rights to the film. The film's release in all English-speaking territories is handled by The Weinstein Company which released the film on DVD as part of their Dragon Dynasty collection.

== See also ==
- Donnie Yen filmography
