= All's Well, Ends Well 2011 =

2011 Hong Kong film by Chan Hing-ka and Janet Chun

- Film poster
- Traditional Chinese: 最強囍事
- Simplified Chinese: 最强喜事
- Hanyu Pinyin: Zuì Qiáng Xǐ Shì
- Jyutping: Zeoi3 Keong4 Hei2 Si6
- Directed by: Chan Hing-kai; Janet Chun
- Written by: Ho Miu-kei; Chan Hing-kai; Fung Ching-ching
- Produced by: Raymond Wong
- Starring: Donnie Yen; Louis Koo; Carina Lau; Raymond Wong; Cecilia Cheung; Chapman To; Wenwen Han; Yan Ni
- Cinematography: Horace Wong
- Edited by: Tang Man-to; Cheung Ka-fai
- Music by: Chiu Tsang-hei; Andy Cheung
- Production companies: Pegasus Motion Pictures; Icon Pictures Limited
- Distributed by: Pegasus Motion Pictures
- Release date: 2 February 2011
- Running time: 104 minutes
- Country: Hong Kong
- Language: Cantonese

All's Well, Ends Well 2011 (Chinese: 最強囍事) is a 2011 Hong Kong romantic comedy film directed by Chan Hing-ka and Janet Chun. It is the sixth instalment in the All's Well, Ends Well film series, was released on 2 February 2011.

== Plot ==
Make-up artist Sammy (Louis Koo) is hired by Dream (Yan Ni) as the director of a cosmetic company with Claire (Cecilia Cheung) being the only colleague who is willing to assist him. Sammy invites Arnold (Donnie Yen), a fellow make-up artist, to join him. Though Arnold might appear to be a woman's magnet, his heart still lingers with his first love Mona (Carina Lau), a frustrated writer. A minor incident in the new product commercial ties the friendship among Sammy, Arnold and the yacht billionaire Syd (Chapman To). Syd meets Claire and aims to pursue her. Having grown up in a poor family, Claire seizes this as a golden opportunity to live a prosperous life and asks Sammy for help to fulfill her dream, without realising that she has fallen in love with Sammy.

== Cast ==
=== Main cast ===
Cast	Role	Description
Donnie Yen	Arnold Cheng 鄭宇強	Make-up artist on counter Mona Tai's first boyfriend
Louis Koo	Sammy Shum 沈美	God-class make-up artist Claire Kan's boyfriend
Carina Lau	Mona Tai 戴夢妮	Frustrated writer Arnold Cheng's first girlfriend
Raymond Wong	Clerk Chan 陳奇俠	Oil magnate Dream's boyfriend
Cecilia Cheung	Claire Kan 簡潔	Sammy Shum's assistant and girlfriend
Chapman To	Syd Liu 廖小必 (滑溜溜)	Rich Yacht Prince; Victoria Lee's boyfriend
Lynn Hung	Victoria Lee	Real estate tycoon's daughter Syd Liu's girlfriend
Yan Ni	Dream 占占	Cosmetic company director Clerk Chan's girlfriend

=== Other cast ===
Cast	Role	Description
Margie Tsang (曾華倩)	Helen Cheng	Arnold Cheng's younger sister
Mannor Chan (陳曼娜)		Arnold Cheng's aunt
Nancy Sit		Arnold Cheng's mother
Elvina Kong		Arnold Cheng's younger sister
Ronald Cheng		Delivery boy
Lee Heung-kam		Arnold Cheng's grandmother
Stephy Tang		Arnold Cheng's niece
Ciwi Lam	Social	
Maggie Lee (李曼筠)	Creamy	Sammy Shum's secretary
Angelababy	Better	Receptionist
Marie Zhuge (諸葛梓歧)	Memo	Dream's secretary
JJ Jia	Kiki	
Jo Kuk	Siu Tim Kuk 小甜谷	
Wilson Yip	Minister 神父	
Irene Wang (汪圓圓)	Jodi	
Michelle Lo (盧覓雪)	Posh lady 闊太太	
Paw Hee-ching	Cardboard granny 紙皮婆婆	
Cheng Ho Lam (鄭可琳)	Cardboard girl 紙皮妹妹	
Mak Ling Ling (麥玲玲)	Posh lady 闊太太	

== Release ==
The film was released on 2 February 2011, which was Chinese New Year Eve.
