= Enter the Fat Dragon (2020 film) =

2020 Hong Kong film by Kenji Tanigaki and Aman Chang

- Hong Kong film poster
- 肥龍過江
- Directed by: Kenji Tanigaki; Aman Chang
- Screenplay by: Wong Jing; Philip Lui
- Produced by: Donnie Yen; Wong Jing; Connie Wong
- Starring: Donnie Yen; Teresa Mo; Wong Jing; Niki Chow
- Cinematography: Takuro Ishizaka; Edmond Fung; Jimmy Kwok; Ng King-man; Ko Chiu-lam
- Edited by: Li Ka-wing
- Music by: Chan Kwong-wing; Kay Chan
- Production companies: Bona Film Group; Bullet Films; Mega-Vision Pictures; Sun Entertainment Film Group
- Distributed by: Mega-Vision Pictures
- Release date: 23 January 2020
- Running time: 96 minutes
- Countries: Hong Kong; Japan
- Languages: Cantonese; Japanese
- Box office: $5,356,000

Enter the Fat Dragon is a 2020 Hong Kong martial arts comedy film directed by Kenji Tanigaki and Aman Chang from a screenplay by and co-starring Wong Jing, who also acted and produced, alongside Connie Wong and lead actor Donnie Yen. Co-stars include Teresa Mo and Niki Chow. The film was a Chinese New Year streaming release on OTT platforms in China and achieved strong streaming numbers across IQiyi, Tencent, and Youku. It was also the highest-grossing film in Malaysia and one of the top ten in Singapore that year.

== Plot ==
Fallon Zhu, a once-fit and highly skilled Hong Kong police officer, finds his career in decline after being reassigned to the evidence room following a failed case. The sedentary job, combined with emotional setbacks, leads to significant weight gain and a sense of frustration. Despite his current state, Fallon is given a chance to redeem himself when he is tasked with escorting a criminal suspect to Japan. He is promised a transfer back to active duty if the mission is successful.

However, upon arriving in Japan, Fallon faces a series of challenges, including cultural differences, language barriers, and a lack of support from the local police force. When the suspect escapes under his watch, Fallon is left disgraced and stranded in Tokyo. Determined to restore his reputation, Fallon teams up with a Japanese translator, who becomes his unlikely ally. Together, they uncover a conspiracy involving powerful criminal gangs operating in Tokyo.

Forced to take matters into his own hands, Fallon uses his martial arts prowess to combat the criminals. Along the way, he adapts his fighting style to his new physique and rediscovers his passion for police work.

== Cast ==
- Donnie Yen as Fallon Zhu / Zhu Fu Long, the protagonist and an overweight police officer at HKPD. He has a turbulent relationship with his fiancee, Chloe, and he saves her when she gets into trouble with yakuza.
- Teresa Mo as Charisma / Christina, a Hong Kong restaurant owner in Shinjuku, Tokyo, and the former lover of Thor. She fled Hong Kong to Japan due to gambling debt.
- Wong Jing as Thor, a former inspector at the HKPD, and Charisma's former lover.
- Niki Chow as Chloe Song / Chloe Zhu, a famous actress and the fiancée of Fallon Zhu, from whom she takes a break due to ups and downs in the relationship.
- Naoto Takenaka as Mr. Endo / Inspector Endo (Nihongo: 遠藤さん, Endō-san / 遠藤警部, Endō Keibu), a corrupt chief inspector at the Tokyo Metropolitan Police Department.
- Tetsu Watanabe as Grandfather (Nihongo: 祖父, Sofu), the oyabun of the Higazhino Group and boss of Shimakura.
- Hiro Hayama as Yuji (Nihongo: ゆうじ, Yūji), an adult video director and police informant from Japan who is murdered by Shimakura, a yakuza boss, for drug smuggling committed by the Higazhino Group.
- Louis Cheung as Commander Huang, Fallon Zhu's commanding officer at the HKPD.
- Chaney Lin (Lin Qiu Nan) as Little Tiger, a delivery boy and employee at Charisma's restaurant in Shinjuku.
- Joey Tee as Shimakura (Nihongo: 島倉, Shimakura), a yakuza boss, leader of the Higazhino Group and the main antagonist of the movie. He murdered Yuji.
- Wong Cho-lam as traffic cop
- Lawrence Chou as police officer
- Jerry Lamb as police officer
- Masanori Mimoto as Benny, the underboss of Shimakura at the Higazhino Group
- Jim Chim as bank manager Zhan
- Jessica Jann as Maggie, an English-speaking police officer and Mr. Endo's interpreter.
- Philip Ng as Jack, the main villain from the 2005 film SPL: Sha Po Lang (cameo)
  - Note: Jack was originally played by Wu Jing in the 2005 film.
- Anthony Chan as Chief commissioner, the boss of Fallon Zhu and Commander Huang.
- Kentaro Shimazu as Goofy, the underboss of Grandfather at the Higazhino Group.

== Production ==
Speaking about the film in an interview, lead actor Donnie Yen said that it is not "necessarily" a remake of the 1978 film of the same name. Director Wong Jing also stated that the two productions just happen to share the same title. Yen had previously played a fat character in an unrelated 2015 TV commercial.

== Release ==
Mega-Vision Pictures co-produced and distributed Enter the Fat Dragon in Hong Kong and other territories. The film was released on 23 January 2020 in Hong Kong and selected countries.

== Reception ==
On the review aggregator website Rotten Tomatoes, 64% of 14 critics' reviews are positive, with an average rating of 6/10.
