= Big Brother (2018 film) =

2018 Hong Kong film by Kam Ka-wai

- Film poster
- Traditional Chinese: 大師兄
- Simplified Chinese: 大师兄
- Hanyu Pinyin: Dà Shī Xiōng
- Jyutping: Daai6 Si1 Hing1
- Directed by: Kam Ka-wai
- Screenplay by: Chan Tai-li
- Produced by: Wong Jing; Connie Wong; Donnie Yen
- Starring: Donnie Yen; Joe Chen; Lok Man-kit; Yu Kang
- Cinematography: Jam Yau; Noah Wong
- Edited by: Li Ka-wing
- Music by: Day Tai
- Production companies: Mega-Vision Project Workshop; Bona Film Group; Sun Entertainment Culture; Er Dong Pictures; Super Bullet Pictures; Horgos Huanxing Entertainment Company; Shanghai Bona Culture Media Company; Mega-Vision Project Production
- Distributed by: Mega-Vision Project Workshop
- Release dates: 16 August 2018 (Hong Kong, Malaysia, Singapore); 24 August 2018 (China, Taiwan) August 30, 2018 (United States)
- Running time: 101 minutes
- Country: Hong Kong
- Language: Cantonese
- Box office: US$22.03 million

Big Brother is a 2018 Hong Kong action drama film directed by Kam Ka-wai and starring Donnie Yen and Joe Chen. The film was released on 16 August 2018.

== Plot ==
After several years of serving in the United States Marine Corps, Henry Chan decides to start a career as a schoolteacher at his former school, Tak Chi Secondary School. After showing his recommendation letter to the principal and getting accepted, the principal informs Henry that the class he must teach is room 6B, a class considered one of the worst in the school. Upon arriving in the class, Henry notices most of the kids are being mischievous and doing activities not related to school. After initially being unable to get the kids' attention, Henry comments on the activities that they are already doing, then walks to the front of the class and introduces himself, but in vain. Henry then forces the fire sprinkler to activate, causing the students to get soaked and allowing him to welcome them to his class.

Later, Henry walks into class, barely managing to avoid a tub of water that the students set up to prank him with, and seeing one of the students, Jack, with a pack of cigarettes, he confiscates the pack. Then Henry asks one of the students, Zufa, to name the three ingredients in a cigarette, which interests the class into listening to Henry's lesson explaining the negative effects of a cigarette and how tar could form in someone's lungs. At lunch, the captain of the school's basketball team trips Jack's friend Bruce. This results in a fight in which five of Henry's students get suspended, and Henry manages to stop a fight between Jack and one of the basketball players before they leave the building. That night, Henry decides to look at the files of all five students: Zufa, the son of a Pakistani immigrant, always being discriminated because of his race and only wanting to become a musician; a girl named Denan, who is a tomboy wanting to get her father's attention; and twin brothers Bruce and Chris, who plays video games and works at a grocery store to make money respectively. However, Henry is unable to find any information about Jack's family background.

Some time later, Henry notices Zufa running away from his father and associates after stealing a ticket that they were going to resell. Henry takes Zufa to a concert and lets Zufa perform in front of a crowd since being bullied several years ago. Elsewhere, Bruce and Chris's father comes home, and when he shoves them out of his home after they refused to buy him a beer, Henry appears the next day and tells their father to go to rehabilitation for the boys' wellbeing. At Denan's house, she drives away in her parents' car after her father tells her to act like a girl, and Henry stops her after which he informs Denan that driving without a license is illegal. He then takes her to a racetrack along with her father, where her go-kart is destroyed by a truck while she barely escapes. Unaware of her survival, her father cries mourning Denan, who realizes that he does love her and hugs him.

The next day at school, Bruce and Chris are sent to the rehabilitation center where their father is and he explains, as they interview him, that his wife left him at his lowest, forcing him to start drinking and forget about the twins; then, he apologizes to them. In the meantime, Jack is working for a mixed martial arts (MMA) bettor, Kane, who tells him to drug a fighter's drink before the next game. As he does so, he is caught. Before Jack can put the blame on Kane, the bettor locks him inside a locker. Henry eventually arrives and manages to fend off Kane's men and a professional fighter planned to fight in a few minutes. This causes Henry to become more respected among the students in his classroom. Unbeknownst to him, Kane was actually a student that Henry had bullied back in his youth by throwing water balloons at the piano Kane was playing and breaking his hand with a statue, resulting in him getting in trouble and sent off to the United States. While Henry may not recognise him, Kane remembers him very well.

In the mock entrance examination, everyone in Henry's class does well, except for Bruce, who has started using prescription drugs that he thinks will help him study better, but ends up becoming addicted. Although Henry promises to Bruce that he would help him, Bruce starts to become more depressed, and eventually jumps off the balcony of their house, putting him in a coma. Henry's teaching license is then revoked by the teaching officials after the media twists the news and blames it on him, which causes the students to begin studying harder to prove Henry's teaching abilities.

On the day of the exam, the class receives a text message to meet Henry in the school an hour before the exam. However, this turns out to be a trick, as it is the work of Kane and his employees, who want to lock Henry's students up so they are unable to take the exam. Knowing this, Henry quickly arrives to fight Kane's employees and let his students escape to the examination hall. When all of Kane's employees are neutralised and the two get into a one-on-one fight, Kane informs Henry that he was the one whom Henry had thrown water balloons at and broken his arm when he was little, preventing him from competing in the upcoming music competition, before Henry asks for forgiveness and walks out of the classroom.

After several weeks, every student passes, and the school is awarded a twenty percent bonus fund due to the students performing well in the exam. Henry returns to teaching the next year, and performs the fire sprinkler trick on another mischievous classroom.

== Cast ==
- Donnie Yen as Henry Chan (陳俠), class teacher of Tak Chi Secondary School's 6B class who is an alumnus of the school himself. A troubled youth in the past, he was sent to the United States to attend military boarding school. Eventually he served as a Marine for the United States Marine Corps. He was persuaded by his former principal to teach at his alma meter, where he uses unconventional methods to help his students.
  - Chaney Lin as child Henry Chan.
- Joe Chen as Leung Wing-sum (梁穎心), as honors class teacher at Tak Chi who is very patient with her students.
- Lok Ming-kit as Jack Li (李偉聰), Chan's student who lives with his grandmother after his parents were killed in a car accident and works for Law after class hoping to buy a large home for his grandmother.
- Yu Kang as Kane Law (羅健英), a triad leader who wants to acquire Tak Chi's land. He was Chan's rival during their childhood where Chan broke his hand during a fight, forcing him to give up his passion of playing piano.
  - Wen Zhi as child Kane Law
- Bruce Tong as Bruce Kwan (關啟程), Chan's student who has ADHD
- Chris Tong as Chris Kwan (關啟賢), Chan's student and Bruce's younger brother who is addicted to online games due to his mother's abandonment and father's alcoholism.
- Gladys Li as Gladys Wong (王得男), Chan's student who is a tomboy who dreams to be a Formula One racer despite her family's objections.
- Gordon Lau as Gordon Hong (項祖發), Chan's student who is of Pakistani descent who loves to sing but faces discrimination due to his skin color.
- Dominic Lam as Patrick Lam (林國強), the current principal of Tak Chi Secondary School.
- Alfred Cheung as Chief Wong (黃高官)
- Bowie Wu as Fong Shu-yan (方樹人), the former principal of Tak Chi Secondary School who persuaded Chan to teach at his alma meter.
- Felix Lok as the Kwan brothers' father who turned to alcoholism due to his wife leaving him for a rich man and neglects communication with his sons as a result.
- Benjamin Au-yeung as Ben Sir, a teacher at Tak Chi.
- Billy Lau as Gladys's father who opposes his daughter to pursue her dream.
- Lee Fung as Jack's grandmother.
- Koo Tin-nung as Boss Cheung (張老闆)
- Jeffrey Ngai as student of Tak Chi Secondary School's 6B class

== Reception ==
=== Box office ===
The film grossed a total of US$22,029,250 worldwide, combining its box office gross from Hong Kong, China, North America and Australia.

In Hong Kong, the film grossed HK$7,253,433 during its theatrical run from 16 August to 3 October 2018.

In China, the film grossed a total of CN¥146,303,000 at the box office.

=== Critical reception ===
Simon Abrams gave the film a score of 2.5 stars on RogerEbert.com. Abrams described the film as a 'corny, civic-minded "Stand and Deliver"' with "leaps in feel-good logic" while asserting that Donnie Yen's "disarming poise and arch sincerity" would "[make] you want to suspend your disbelief".

== See also ==
- Donnie Yen filmography
