= Moonlight Express =

1999 Hong Kong film by Daniel Lee

- Film poster
- Traditional Chinese: 星月童話
- Simplified Chinese: 星月童话
- Hanyu Pinyin: Xīng Yuè Tóng Huà
- Jyutping: Sing1 Jyut6 Tung4 Waa2
- Directed by: Daniel Lee
- Screenplay by: Law Chi-leung; Yumiko Aoyagi; Susan Chan; Yeung Sin-ling
- Produced by: Catherine Hun; Ichiese Taka
- Starring: Leslie Cheung; Takako Tokiwa; Michelle Yeoh
- Cinematography: Venus Keung; Chan Chi-ying; Thomas Yeung
- Edited by: Eric Kwong; Azrael Chung
- Music by: Henry Lai Wan-man
- Production companies: Mei Ah Film Production; Hakuhodo; Media Factory; OZ; JC Production
- Distributed by: Mei Ah Entertainment
- Release date: 1 April 1999
- Running time: 102 minutes
- Countries: Hong Kong; Japan
- Languages: Cantonese; Japanese
- Box office: HK$5,565,570

Moonlight Express is a 1999 Hong Kong-Japanese romance film directed by Daniel Lee and starring Leslie Cheung and Takako Tokiwa.

== Plot ==
Hitomi, a Japanese resident, comes to Hong Kong after the death of her fiancé Tetsuya in a fatal accident to settle several important matters surrounding his demise. Although the incident was years ago, it has apparently left an indelible mark in her life as she could not forget him.

Enter Kar-bo, an undercover cop, was involved in a drug bust-up which would later incriminate him. Hitomi stumbles into him and was amazed that he looked remarkably similar to her dead lover. They soon found themselves having strong feelings for each other, although at the same time, he has to flee to China as things have gone from bad to worse for him.

What invariably follows is a constant cat-and-mouse game of running away from authorities who were tipped off as to his location and only ends when Kar-bo reached a ranch belonging to an old friend. Surprisingly, Hitomi, although conscious as to the fact that Kar-bo can never be as close to being the real Tetsuya, endures his hardships with him unfailingly and tests the resolve of both these troubled lovers.

== Cast ==
- Leslie Cheung as Shek Kar-bo / Tetsuya Misawa
- Takako Tokiwa as Hitomi
- Michelle Yeoh as Michelle
- Yuka Hoshino as Tomoko
- Jack Kao as Gene
- Austin Wai as Officer Ko
- Liu Kai-chi as Officer Tung
- Jimmy Wong as Officer Tung's detective
- Lee Heung-kam as Tatsuya's landlady
- Mars as Officer Tung's detective
- Jude Poyer as Michelle's customer at club
- Bak Ka-sin as Mahjong player
- Sam Lee as Mahjong Player
- Rocky Lai as Taxi Driver
- Lo Yuen
- Ho Fat-ming
- Tang Chiu-ying
- Fook Tin-shun
- Chang Kin-yung as Policeman
- Simon Cheung as Policeman
- Chan Po-chun
- Lee Kim-wing
