= Donnie Yen =

Hong Kong actor and martial artist (born 1963)

- 甄子丹
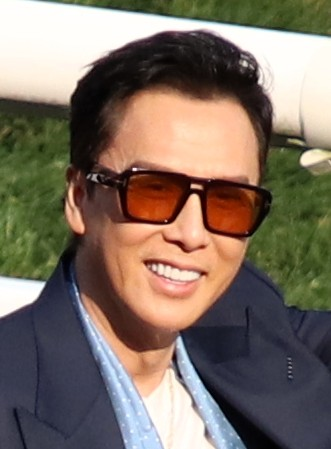
- Yen in 2025

Member of the Chinese People's Political Consultative Conference
- Incumbent
- Assumed office March 2023

Personal details
- Born: Donnie Yen Chi-tan; 27 July 1963 (age 63) Guangzhou, Guangdong, China
- Citizenship: Hong Kong (1963–1974, 2009–present); United States (1974–2010)
- Spouses: Leung Zing-ci (m. 1993; div. 1994); Cissy Wang (m. 2003)
- Children: 3
- Parents: Klyster Yen (father); Bow-sim Mark (mother)
- Occupation: Actor; martial artist; action director and choreographer; film director; producer
- Awards: Full list
- Website: www.donnieyen.asia

Chinese name
- Chinese: 甄子丹
Transcriptions
Standard Mandarin
- Hanyu Pinyin: Zhēn Zǐdān
- Wade–Giles: Chen^{1} Tzŭ^{3}-tan^{1}
- Tongyong Pinyin: Jhen Zǐh-tan
- IPA: [ʈʂə́n tsɨ̀.tán]
Yue: Cantonese
- Yale Romanization: Yān Jí-dāan
- Jyutping: jan^{1} zi^{2} daan^{1}
- Canton Romanization: Yen^{1} Ji^{2}-dan^{1}
- IPA: [jɐ́n tsǐː.táːn]

Donnie Yen Chi-tan is a Hong Kong actor, filmmaker, martial artist, and action director. His accolades include three Golden Horse Awards and five Hong Kong Film Awards. He is best known for portraying Wing Chun grandmaster Ip Man in the Ip Man film series, namely Ip Man (2008), Ip Man 2 (2010), Ip Man 3 (2015), and Ip Man 4: The Finale (2019). He also served as a co-producer of the spin-off Master Z: Ip Man Legacy (2018).

Born in Guangdong, Yen developed an interest in martial arts at a young age, and began experimenting with various styles, including tai chi and other traditional Chinese martial arts. At age 18, he auditioned for action choreographer Yuen Woo-ping in Hong Kong. He landed his first starring role in the 1984 Hong Kong martial arts action film Drunken Tai Chi. He made his breakthrough role as the antagonist General Nap-lan in Once Upon a Time in China II (1992), opposite Jet Li's character. He appeared in several other Hong Kong kung fu films, including Iron Monkey (1993) and Wing Chun (1994). In 1997, he starred in his directorial debut film Legend of the Wolf.

Yen made his American debut in Highlander: Endgame (2000), followed by a cameo in Blade II (2002). He went on to appear in the American films Shanghai Knights (2003), Rogue One (2016), XXX: Return of Xander Cage (2017), Mulan (2020), and John Wick: Chapter 4 (2023). He has continued to be active in Hong Kong cinema, appearing in the well-received films Hero (2002), SPL: Sha Po Lang (2005), Flash Point (2007), 14 Blades (2010), Wu Xia (2011), Kung Fu Jungle (2014), Chasing the Dragon (2017), Enter the Fat Dragon (2020), Raging Fire (2021), and The Prosecutor (2024), among others. In television, Yen portrayed fictional character Chen Zhen in the television series Fist of Fury (1995); he reprised the role in the 2010 film Legend of the Fist: The Return of Chen Zhen.

For portraying Ip Man in the Ip Man film series (2008–2019), Yen is credited by many for contributing to the popularisation of Wing Chun in China. Alongside Kung fu, particularly Wing Chun, Yen is also known for incorporating mixed martial arts (MMA) elements into his action choreography. Aside from his acting, in 1997, he established his own production company, Bullet Films, which choreographed the action for Western blockbusters like Blade II (2002) and Stormbreaker (2006).

== Early life ==
Yen was born on 27 July 1963 in Guangzhou, Guangdong, China. His mother, Bow-sim Mark, is a Fu-style wudangquan (internal martial arts) and tai chi grandmaster, while his father, Klyster Yen (甄雲龍), was a newspaper editor. When he was 2 years old, his family moved to Hong Kong and then to the United States when he was 11 years old, settling in Boston. He attended Newton North High School.

His younger sister, Chris Yen, is also a martial artist and actress, and appeared in the 2007 film Adventures of Johnny Tao: Rock Around the Dragon.

At a young age, under the influence of his mother, Yen developed an interest in martial arts and began experimenting with various styles, including tai chi and other traditional Chinese martial arts.

At age 18, when Yen was returning to the United States to visit his family, he made a stop in Hong Kong, where he met and auditioned for action choreographer Yuen Woo-ping.

Yen comes from a family of musicians. His mother is a soprano, in addition to being a martial arts teacher in Boston, while his father is a violinist. From a young age, he was taught by his parents to play musical instruments, including the piano.

== Career ==
=== Beginnings to the 1990s ===
Yen's first step into the film industry was when he landed his first starring role in the 1984 film Drunken Tai Chi. After filming Drunken Tai Chi and Tiger Cage (1988), Yen made his breakthrough role as General Nap-lan in Once Upon a Time in China II (1992), which included a fight scene between his character and Wong Fei-hung (portrayed by Jet Li). Yen had a starring role in the film Iron Monkey in 1993. Yen and Li appeared together again in the 2002 film Hero, where Yen played a spear (or qiang) fighter who fought with Li's character, an unnamed swordsman. The film was nominated for Best Foreign Language Film at the 2003 Academy Awards.

In 1995, Yen starred as Chen Zhen in the television series Fist of Fury produced by ATV, which is adapted from the 1972 film of the same title that starred Bruce Lee as Chen Zhen. Yen reprised his role as Chen Zhen in the 2010 film Legend of the Fist: The Return of Chen Zhen by replacing Li who starred as Chen Zhen in the prequel film Fist of Legend, which was released in 1994.

In 1997, Yen started the production company Bullet Films, and made his directorial debut in Legend of the Wolf (1997) and Ballistic Kiss (1998), in which he played the lead character. At age 34, Yen almost went bankrupt. Films produced by his own production company and directed by him were critically acclaimed but did not do well at the box office. Yen was forced to borrow money from loan sharks and his production crew to get by.

=== 2000s: Breakthrough success ===
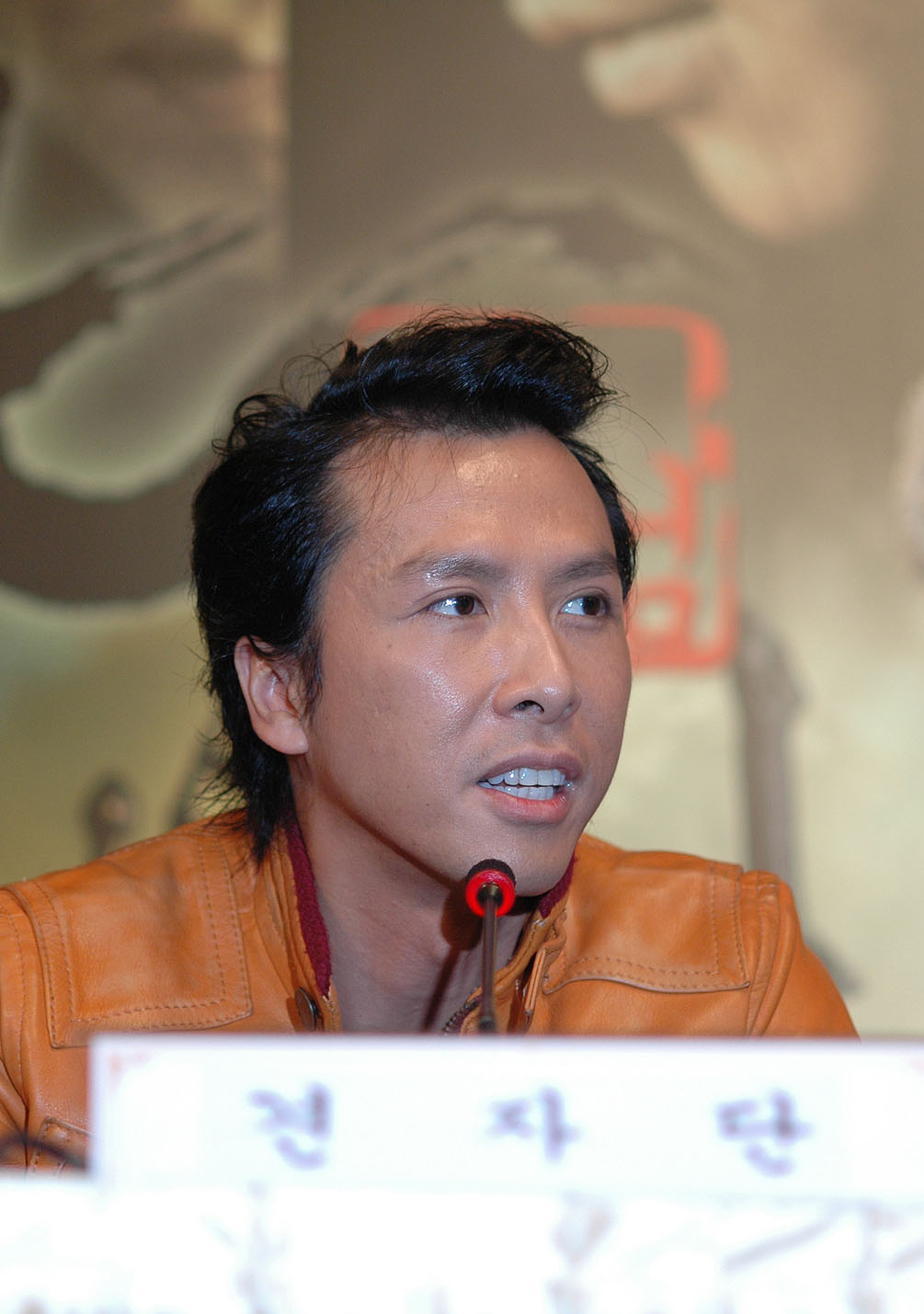
Yen in Seoul in 2005

Yen went back to the United States, where he was invited to choreograph fight scenes in Hollywood films, such as Highlander: Endgame (2000) and Blade II (2002). His choreography and skills impressed the directors, and they invited him for cameo appearances in both films. In 2002, Li was filming Hero and insisted to director Zhang Yimou that he wanted Yen to play the role of Sky, his adversary, due to Yen's martial arts ability. Li personally invited Yen back from Hollywood to star in the film, marking the second time the two actors appeared onscreen together since Once Upon a Time in China II 10 years earlier back in 1992. In 2003, Yen portrayed antagonist Wu Chow opposite Jackie Chan and Owen Wilson in Shanghai Knights.

Yen choreographed most of the fight animation in the 2004 video game Onimusha 3, which featured actors Takeshi Kaneshiro and Jean Reno. Yen continued to be active in Hong Kong cinema in the 2000s, starring as Chu Zhaonan in Tsui Hark's wuxia epic film Seven Swords, and as Ma Kwun in Wilson Yip's brutal crime drama film SPL: Sha Po Lang in 2005. Both films were featured at the 2005 Toronto International Film Festival. Later that year, Yen co-starred with Nicholas Tse and Shawn Yue in Wilson Yip's Dragon Tiger Gate, an adaptation of Wong Yuk-long's manhua series Oriental Heroes. Yen worked as action choreographer in Stormbreaker, starring Alex Pettyfer. Yen continued to work with Wilson Yip in Flash Point (2007), in which he starred as the lead character and served as producer and action choreographer for the film. He won the award for Best Action Choreography at the Golden Horse Film Awards and the Hong Kong Film Awards for his performance in Flash Point.

In 2008, Yen starred in Ip Man, a semi-biographical account of Ip Man, the Wing Chun master of Bruce Lee. Ip Man marked Yen's fourth collaboration with director Wilson Yip, reuniting him with his co-stars in SPL: Sha Po Lang, Sammo Hung and Simon Yam. Ip Man became the biggest box office hit to date featuring Yen in the leading role, grossing HK$25 million in Hong Kong and 100 million yuan in China.

=== 2010s ===
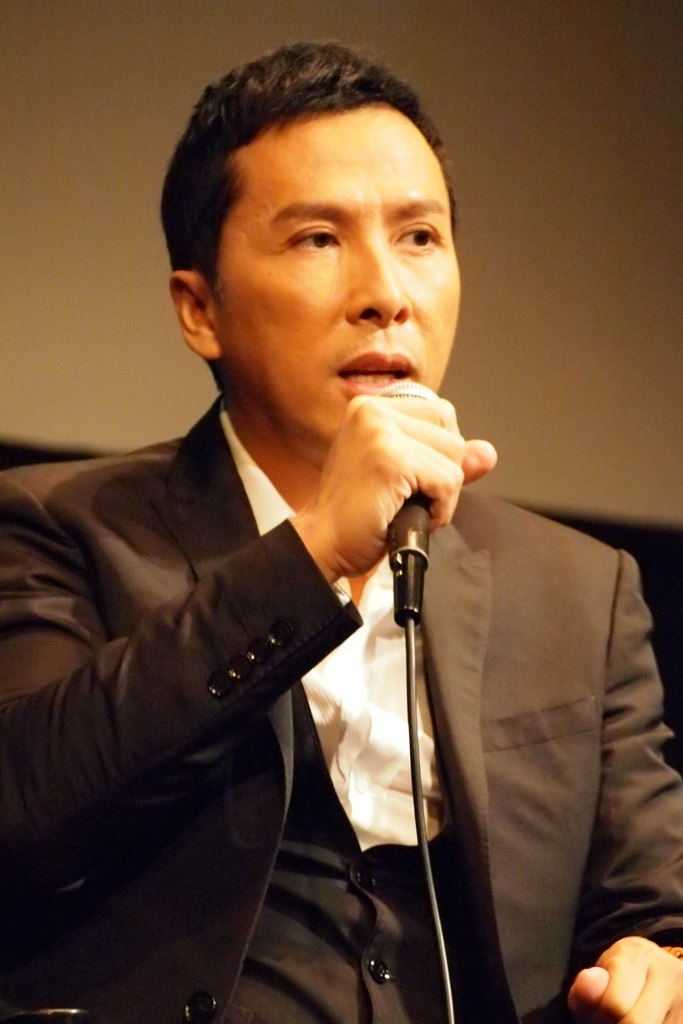
Yen at the New York Film Festival in 2012

In 2010, Ip Man 2 was released. Similar to the first film, it was directed by Wilson Yip. In August 2011, while Yen was on a vacation with his family in the United States, he reportedly received an invitation by producer Avi Lerner to star in The Expendables 2. It was stated that Yen was considering the offer, had many films at hand, and would wait until deciding whether the script appealed to him. Later on, Yen revealed to the Hong Kong media that he had rejected the role. In 2011, Yen revealed that he was venturing into other genres of films and had taken up two comedy roles in a row, in All's Well, Ends Well 2011 and All's Well, Ends Well 2012, and would be working with Carina Lau in the former and Sandra Ng in the latter. Both films were critical and box-office successes.

Yen took a six-month break in the second half of 2011 after the filming of The Monkey King, where he portrayed the title character and main protagonist Sun Wukong, replacing Li once again, in which the film was released during the Chinese New Year period in January 2014, he explained that he wanted to spend more time with his family and be with his children more as they grew up. In 2012, Yen returned to the movie industry and commenced the filming of Special ID, in which he played the main lead, an undercover cop, and also took on the role of action choreographer. In 2013, it was reported that Yen would be playing the lead role for Iceman, a sci-fi action film dealing with time travel and which was filmed in 3D. Yen confirmed that MMA would be used in both of the aforementioned films.

In February 2013, the Weinstein Company confirmed that it had purchased the rights to Crouching Tiger, Hidden Dragon: Sword of Destiny and contacted Yen to play the male lead. In March 2013, Hong Kong magazines surfaced photos of Harvey and Bob Weinstein traveling to Hong Kong to meet with Yen and persuade him to accept the offer. It was reported that Yen was considering the role and quoted as saying, "The first is that my schedule this year is very packed. The second is that the first film is already such a classic. I am afraid of the pressure, that the original cannot be surpassed." In May 2013, during the annual Cannes Film Festival, the Weinstein Company announced that Yen would play the lead role of Silent Wolf in Crouching Tiger, Hidden Dragon: Sword of Destiny, alongside leading female action star Michelle Yeoh reprising her role as Yu Shu Lien, and with director Yuen Woo-ping, Yen's mentor. It was revealed that the movie would be filmed in both English and Mandarin to appeal to the international market. It was revealed during the Crouching Tiger, Hidden Dragon II press conference that the Weinstein Company had obtained rights to Akira Kurosawa's Seven Samurai, was planning a remake and was negotiating with Yen, George Clooney, and Zhang Ziyi to star in the film. Yen declined the offer due to scheduling conflicts for the filming of Ip Man 3. Yen earned HK$220 million (US$28.4 million) from four films and six advertisements in 2013.

In late March 2015, Ip Man 3 was announced. Yen reprised his role as the titular character Ip Man, Bruce Lee's wing chun master. Retired boxer and former heavyweight champion Mike Tyson was confirmed to join the cast. Yen mentioned that he was a big fan of Tyson, watched many of his professional boxing bouts, and was excited to work with him. Tyson stated during a press conference that he was a huge fan of Yen and has watched Ip Man and Ip Man 2 more than three times each and was honored to be invited for the final installment of the trilogy. Principal photography for Ip Man 3 began on 25 March 2015, and the finished film was released in December 2015 in parts of Asia and around the world in early 2016 to generally favorable reviews.

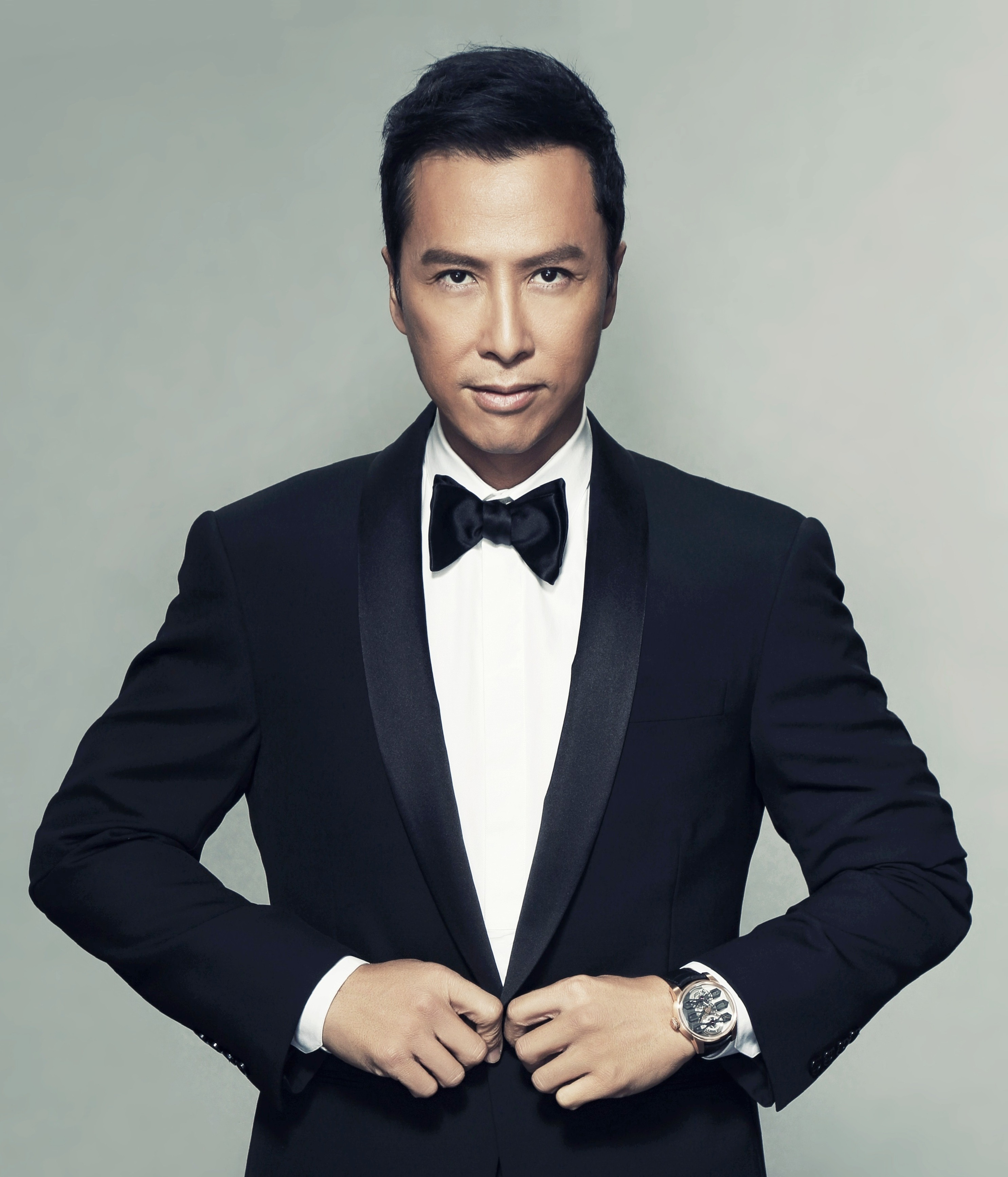
Yen in February 2018

In 2016, Yen co-starred in the Star Wars anthology film Rogue One as Chirrut Îmwe, the Zatoichi-like blind transient warrior. On 12 February 2016, it was confirmed that Yen would once again replace Li for the third time as Xiang in the upcoming action film XXX: Return of Xander Cage (after Legend of the Fist: The Return of Chen Zhen in 2010 and The Monkey King in 2014). For the promotion of XXX: Return of Xander Cage, Paramount focused marketing efforts on Yen in China and most parts of Asia, placing him at the front of the film posters ahead of Vin Diesel, and shared clips and reviews of Yen's performance in the movie on the popular Chinese social media site Weibo. Paramount's efforts worked very well in China. The film was number one in its opening weekend with $61.9 million, and crossed the $100 million mark in just six days with $22.2m coming from Valentine's Day alone after rave reviews praising Yen's performance swept through Chinese social media, driving moviegoers to the cinema. Yen's performance in both Rogue One and XXX: Return of Xander Cage received positive responses from critics and general audiences. For XXX: Return of Xander Cage, media outlets praised Yen's performance. In the case of Rogue One, Yen's performance was applauded by audiences worldwide. In a poll on the Star Wars webpage, in which more 40,000 people voted, Yen's character Chirrut Îmwe was voted as audiences' favorite Rogue One character.

While Yen was filming XXX: Return of Xander Cage in Canada, he received offers from Hollywood studios and directors. At the same time, Hong Kong director Wong Jing personally flew to Canada to invite Yen to star in his film Chasing the Dragon, a remake of the film To Be Number One. Yen eventually accepted the offer and played a non-traditional role of a villain with limited fighting scenes and the opportunity to work alongside Andy Lau. In September 2017, Chasing the Dragon was released with positive reviews from critics, citing Yen's versatility as an actor and his portrayal of Ng Sek Ho, the main character of the film. Chasing the Dragon was a hit with audiences in most parts of Asia. In Hong Kong, Chasing the Dragon is ranked as one of the top 5 Hong Kong films in 2017.

In 2017, Yen received a call from Li and Alibaba CEO Jack Ma about a potential collaboration on a short martial arts film known as Gong Shou Dao – to promote a new form of tai chi as an Olympic sport in the future. Yen was on holiday with his wife to celebrate their anniversary, but cancelled his plans to take part in the film. Yen declined any salary for this participation for GSD as he stated that "friendship is not measured by money" and that he hopes his participation can help promote Chinese martial arts to worldwide audiences. In return, Li and Ma surprised Yen and his wife Cissy, by helping to celebrate their wedding anniversary on the set. The full GSD 20 minutes short film was released on 11 November – China's Singles' Day, debuting on Youku and Li's official Facebook page, garnering a total of more than 100 million views worldwide. Netizens in China praised Yen's speed and technique in the film, with most audiences (over 190,000) voting Yen as the highlight of the short film. In late 2017, Yen began filming Big Brother, a mixed martial arts film where Yen plays a high school teacher with unconventional methods and a dark past.

In 2017, a live-action film adaption of the video game Sleeping Dogs was announced, with Yen playing the lead character Wei Shen. In February 2018, Yen confirmed the continued production of the film through social media. In 2019, Yen reprised his role as Ip Man in Ip Man 4: The Finale. During the Hong Kong protests of that year, protesters urged a boycott of the film, citing the pro-Beijing stances of Yen, co-star Danny Chan, and producer Raymond Wong. The film was a box office success, grossing over three times its budget of $52 million and becoming the highest-grossing Chinese film of all time in Malaysia as well as the third-highest-grossing Chinese film in North America in five years.

=== 2020s ===
In March 2020, as part of the press tour for Disney's live-action remake of Mulan, when Yen was asked by reporters whether he was interested in appearing in a superhero film, Yen revealed that he had been offered a role in Warner Brothers' Justice League and Aquaman films by Zack Snyder, but turned it down due to scheduling conflicts. The role offered was that of Nuidis Vulko, which eventually went to Willem Dafoe. Yen joined the cast of John Wick: Chapter 4, which was released in March 2023. Yen and the film both received positive reviews from critics. In May 2024, it was reported that Yen would star in a John Wick spinoff movie around his assassin character Caine. In April 2025, the Caine spinoff was confirmed at CinemaCon to be pushing through, with Yen also directing and Mattson Tomlin writing the script. And the title of the spinoff movie is revealed to be simply known as Caine and filming began in Europe in April 2026, and will continue in Hong Kong in late June 2026. Yen lends his voice and likeness to the video game Phantom Blade Zero and serves as a creative consultant.

== Martial arts history, style and philosophy ==
Yen is skilled in martial arts disciplines like Tai Chi, Boxing, Jeet Kune Do, Hapkido, Tang Soo Do, Taekwondo, Karate, Muay Thai, Freestyle Wrestling, Brazilian Jiu-Jitsu, Hung Ga, Sanda, Judo, Shaolin Kung Fu, Wudangquan, Wing Chun, and Wushu.

Yen describes himself as a mixed martial artist. He learned Shaolin Kung Fu and wudangquan at a young age under his mother's tutelage. He then wanted to learn Taekwondo in his teenage years, earning a 6th Dan in the process. At the time, the Beijing Wushu Team had a scout in the United States and invited Yen over to Beijing, China, where he began training at the Beijing Sports Institute, the same facility where champion-turned-actor Jet Li trained; this is where the two of them crossed paths for the first time. Upon his return to the United States, Yen won gold medals in various wushu competitions.

Over the course of his life, Yen embarked on a quest to explore and acquire expertise in various other forms of martial arts disciplines; he obtained black and purple belts in Judo and Brazilian Jiu-Jitsu, respectively, and went on to study Wrestling, Muay Thai, and Boxing under various instructors. His exposure to the combat sport Mixed Martial Arts (MMA) was heightened when he went back to the United States from 2000 to 2003. While making his Hollywood debut, he also took time off to learn the various martial arts forms in preparation for subsequent and future film roles. Yen's progress was evident when he returned to the East Asian film industry, where he implemented his newfound knowledge of MMA, showcased in films such as SPL: Sha Po Lang (2005), Flash Point (2007), and Special ID (2013).

Near the end of 2007, Yen added a new martial arts system to his arsenal. He was offered the role of Wing Chun grandmaster and mentor of film star Bruce Lee, Ip Man, in a 2008 film named after the grandmaster. He worked hard and studied Wing Chun under Ip Man's eldest son, Ip Chun, for 9 months before tackling the role. Ip Chun has since praised Yen for his effort, his skills as a martial artist, and his ability to grasp the full concept of Wing Chun much faster than anyone else he has taught. With the huge success of the Ip Man films both critically and commercially, Yen has been credited by many for contributing to the popularisation of Wing Chun in China.

Yen believes that combining many martial arts together produces the most effective and harmonious style. Yen has said, "When you watch my films, you're feeling my heart." He believes in practical combat, and in his opinion, MMA is the most authentic type of practical combat.

Yen was a rebel in his youth due to the huge expectations and pressures from his parents, as his mother is the founder of the Chinese Wushu Research Institute in Boston, and his father was a scholar and a musician.

Other martial arts film stars like Jackie Chan and Jet Li have stated that Yen may be the best fighter in terms of practical combat in East Asian cinema.

World class fighters, such as former Strikeforce Middleweight Champion Cung Le and former World Boxing Heavyweight Champion Mike Tyson, who have worked with Yen in the films Bodyguards and Assassins and Ip Man 3, respectively, have both claimed that Yen is an incredible martial artist and would do well in authentic combat. While filming Ip Man 3, crew members were worried that Tyson, who had been a professional boxer, would accidentally injure Yen. However, it was ultimately Yen who fractured Tyson's finger while using his elbow to block Tyson's punches. Tyson insisted on finishing the scene before he was treated in hospital.

In 2019, he was inducted into the Martial Arts History Museum Hall of Fame.

=== Action choreography ===
Yen was considered one of the premiere action choreographers in the world, having been invited by Hollywood to choreograph blockbusters such as Blade II, Highlander: Endgame, and Shanghai Knights. Throughout the East Asian cinematic universe, he remained the principal action choreographer for most of his movies and has won multiple awards for his action choreography.

Yen's most famous works include films such as Flash Point and SPL: Sha Po Lang. He has mentioned that the main differences in East Asian styles of filmmaking and Hollywood are with regards to freedom and control. In the East Asian film industry, the action choreographer takes over the scene during the fight scene. This means that for action scenes filmed in East Asia, the choreographer becomes the director and is in full control over camera placements, camera angles, and the relationship between the drama and the action; therefore the main director is not needed at all. While in Hollywood, on the other hand, Yen explains that the action choreographer simply choreographs the actions with the director, who still maintains full control of such settings and camera angles.

Yen's work as a choreographer won him the Hong Kong Film Award for Best Action Choreography at the 27th Hong Kong Film Awards and the Golden Horse Award for Best Action Choreography at the 2008 and 2011 Golden Horse Awards.

Yen was the fight choreographer for the 2010 film Legend of the Fist: The Return of Chen Zhen. For this film, Yen mentioned that he included Jeet Kune Do elements as a tribute to the American actor and martial artist Bruce Lee, who played Chen Zhen in the 1972 film Fist of Fury. Furthermore, he incorporated many MMA elements in the film, coupled with the use of Wing Chun. Yen also stated that the concept behind Bruce Lee's Jeet Kune Do is similar to that of MMA, hence the incorporation of many forms of martial arts was a necessity in the film.

He won the Hong Kong Film Award for Best Action Choreography four times, being one of the most frequent winners of this coveted award. He has won awards for his choreography in films such as The Twins Effect, SPL: Sha Po Lang, Flash Point, and Kung Fu Jungle.

=== Bodybuilding and transformation for roles ===
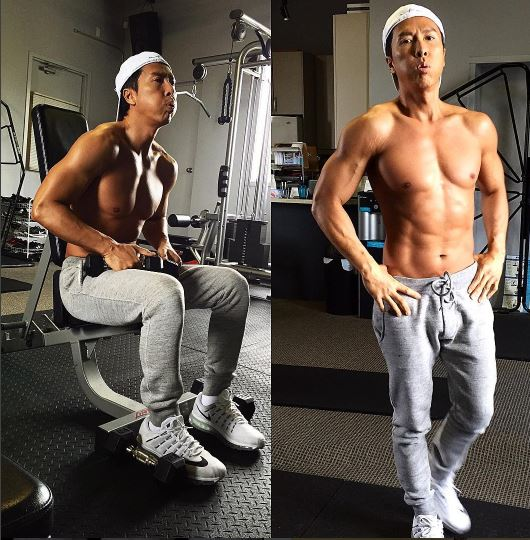
Yen regaining his physique in 2016 for XXX: Return of Xander Cage, after losing weight for Ip Man 3 and Rogue One.

Yen is renowned for his physical fitness, strength, and speed achieved through his use of a strict and disciplined fitness regime.

However, despite his muscular build, Yen has gained attention for his dedication to his roles and for the lengths to which he goes to achieve the physical build and appearance of the characters he plays. In 2007, Yen lost over 14 kg (30 pounds) to reach the weight of 54 kg (120 pounds) to better portray the slender Ip Man and the techniques of Wing Chun, which focuses on techniques and not strength. He did so through a very strict regimen of limiting himself to a plain diet consisting mainly of vegetables.

In 2010, still fresh off Ip Man 2, Yen was cast as Chen Zhen in Legend of the Fist: The Return of Chen Zhen, who was originally portrayed by Bruce Lee. He had to regain his muscular physique for the role and took 6 months through a precise and dedicated diet routine. He maintained this bulk and physique while filming The Lost Bladesman, in which he plays Guan Yu, a Chinese general known for his size and spear-fighting abilities.

In 2015, Yen reduced his muscular physique yet again to reprise the role of Ip Man in Ip Man 3 and for his role as the blind warrior monk Chirrut Îmwe in Rogue One. For his role as Xiang in XXX: Return of Xander Cage opposite Vin Diesel, Yen rebuilt his physique.

== Personal life ==
Yen met his first wife, Hong Kong advertising executive Leung Zing-ci (Chinese: 梁靜慈), in 1990. They began dating in 1990. After three years of dating, they married secretly in the United States in November 1993. The marriage ended in less than a year. After their divorce was finalized, Leung realized that she was pregnant with their son, who was born in 1995.

Yen married former beauty queen Cissy Wang after three months of dating in 2003. The couple have two children.

Yen became a US citizen in 1974 but renounced it in 2010 to become a Hong Kong citizen again.

=== Philanthropic work ===
In 2012, Yen and his wife Cissy co-founded Go.Asia, an online charity platform encouraging people to participate in charity work and serve local communities.

In October 2014, Yen was invited to be a guest speaker in front of a crowd of 20,000 youths for We Day Vancouver, where he spoke about the hardships he faced growing up and how he overcame difficulties.

In 2015, Yen visited refugee camps in Thailand, bringing donations and gifts for the refugees. Yen is an ambassador for the international charity Save the Children.

In December 2015, Yen established a charitable fund, Yen's Honour Protection Fund, with the purpose of empowering celebrities to use the law to defend their honor and reputation. Yen said the fund "[seeks] to assist and render help to everyone who needs it, most importantly to heal and repair the hearts and dignities which have been affected." This fund was established after Yen won a lawsuit against Geng Weiguo (AKA Tan Bing), who defamed Yen and hired netizens to threaten Yen's family.

In February 2020, in light of the coronavirus pandemic in China and the rest of the world, Yen stepped in to donate HK$1 million to frontline medical workers in Wuhan. He also produced and dedicated a short clip to thank all medical workers in China in their fight against the coronavirus; the clip was uploaded on Chinese social media site Weibo, where Yen has over 11 million followers. He donated a painting done by himself and his two children, to the frontline medical workers.

=== Politics ===
In 2023, Yen was appointed to the Chinese People's Political Consultative Conference (CPPCC) as a representative of the "Literature and Arts" sector, replacing outgoing fellow action star Jackie Chan. He stated that he was a Chinese patriot and requested that his film roles in Hollywood must positively represent the Chinese.

Yen said of the 2019–2020 Hong Kong protests that "It wasn't a protest [...] it was a riot."

== Awards and nominations ==
Year	Award	Category	Nominated work	Result
1993	Hong Kong Film Awards	Best Supporting Actor	Once Upon a Time in China 2	Nominated
2002	Taurus World Stunt Awards	Best Fight	Iron Monkey	Nominated
2003	Golden Horse Awards	Best Action Choreography	The Twins Effect	Won
2004	Hong Kong Film Awards	Best Action Choreography	The Twins Effect	Won
2006	Hong Kong Film Awards	Best Action Choreography	SPL: Sha Po Lang	Won
2007	Hong Kong Film Awards	Best Action Choreography	Dragon Tiger Gate	Nominated
2007	Golden Bauhinia Awards	Best Action Choreography	Dragon Tiger Gate	Won
2007	Golden Horse Awards	Best Action Choreography	Flash Point	Won
2008	Hong Kong Film Awards	Best Action Choreography	Flash Point	Won
2008	Taurus World Stunt Awards	Best Action in a Foreign Language Film	Flash Point	Won
2009	Beijing College Student Film Festival	Best Actor	Ip Man	Won
2009	Hong Kong Film Awards	Best Actor	Ip Man	Nominated
2009	Huabiao Film Awards	Outstanding Abroad Actor	Ip Man	Won
2010	Hundred Flowers Awards	Best Actor	Bodyguards and Assassins	Nominated
2011	Hong Kong Film Awards	Best Action Choreography	Legend of the Fist: The Return of Chen Zhen	Nominated
2011	3rd Macau International Movie Festival	Best Actor	The Lost Bladesman	Won
2011	Golden Horse Awards	Best Action Choreography	Dragon	Won
2012	Hong Kong Film Awards	Best Action Choreography	Dragon	Nominated
2014	Hong Kong Film Awards	Best Action Choreography	Special ID	Nominated
2014	8th Asian Film Awards	Asian Outstanding Actor	—N/a	Won
2015	Youku Night Awards	2014's Most Influential Actor	—N/a	Won
2015	15th Huading Awards	Best Actor	The Monkey King	Won
2015	Hong Kong Film Awards	Best Action Choreography	Kung Fu Jungle	Won
2017	Foshan Film Awards	Best Actor	—N/a	Won
2017	Foshan Film Awards	Lifetime Achievement Award	—N/a	Won
