= List of New Heavenly Sword and Dragon Sabre episodes =

New Heavenly Sword and Dragon Sabre is a Hong Kong television series first broadcast on TVB Jade in 1986. A total of 40 episodes were produced.

== Episodes ==
=== Episodes 01–20 ===
| No. | Title | Original release date |
|---|---|---|
| 1 | "Episode 01" | November 3, 1986 |
Yu Daiyan from Wudang School discovers the Dragon Sabre. On his way back to Wudang, he is paralyzed by Yin Susu and her brother of the Heavenly Eagle Cult who steal the sabre from him. Not wanting to kill him, she then hires the Longmen Escort Service to deliver Yu Daiyan to Wudang in 10 days, and threatens them with total annihilation if anything happens to him. On their way, the Longmen Escorts are intercepted by Yuan assailants who pose as the seven brothers of Wudang. They take Yu Daiyan and further injure him. Yin Susu tries to save him but doesn't succeed. Zhang Cuishan shows up and saves Yu Daiyan.
| 2 | "Episode 02" | November 4, 1986 |
Zhang Sanfeng tells the story of the origins of Wudang and Emei schools. His investigation of Yu Daiyan's case leads him to the conclusion that Yu Daiyan was injured by Shaolin martial skills King Kong Finger.
| 3 | "Episode 03" | November 5, 1986 |
Zhang Cuishan meets Yin Susu and discovers that she has been impersonating him when killing members of Longmen Escort Service. He follows her to a conference hosted by the Heavenly Eagle Cult to show off the Dragon Sabre.
| 4 | "Episode 04" | November 6, 1986 |
The Golden Haired Lion King, Xie Xun, interrupts the conference to steal the Dragon Sabre. He kills everyone but spares Zhang Cuishan and Yin Susu. Instead, he takes them on a journey to an isolated island.
| 5 | "Episode 05" | November 7, 1986 |
After being shipwrecked, Xie Xun attacks Zhang Cuishan. To save Zhang Cuishan, Yin Susu blinds Xie Xun with her needles. The three of them then take refuge in two caves on an island. Zhang Cuishan marries Yin Susu.
| 6 | "Episode 06" | November 10, 1986 |
Yin Susu gives birth to Zhang Wuji and Xie Xun becomes the child's godfather. Xie Xun tells them the reason why he wanted the Dragon Sabre. His teacher, Cheng Kun, killed his family and then disappeared. He's been seeking revenge ever since.
| 7 | "Episode 07" | November 11, 1986 |
Song Yuanqiao goes to the Emei School to propose marriage to Ji Xiaofu on behalf of Yin Liting. Meanwhile on a mission, a mutual attraction starts between Ji Xiaofu and Yang Xiao from the Ming Cult. She later is injured by Yuan soldiers but is saved by him and he tricks her into sleeping with him. She becomes pregnant and gives birth to a daughter and names her Yang Buhui, which means no regrets.
| 8 | "Episode 08" | November 12, 1986 |
While still hiding her daughter from Abbess Miejue, Ji Xiaofu begs her to cancel her wedding with Yin Liting. The castaways build a raft to return the Central Plains. However, Xie Xun refuses to leave the island. Zhang Cuishan and his family reluctantly leave him. Meanwhile, various martial arts schools confront the Heavenly Eagle Cult to find the Dragon Sabre. Zhang Cuishan and Yin Susu arrive in time to prevent any bloodbath.
| 9 | "Episode 09" | November 13, 1986 |
After 10 years, Yin Susu is reunited with her father, Yin Tianzheng, and brother, Yin Yewang. On their way to Wudang, Zhang Wuji is kidnapped by someone in Yuan soldier uniform. Zhang Cuishan is reunited with his teacher and brothers.
| 10 | "Episode 10" | November 14, 1986 |
Representatives of various martial arts schools arrive at Wudang to celebrate Zhang Sanfeng's 100th birthday. After seeing Zhang Cuishan, they force him to reveal the whereabouts of Xie Xun, but Zhang Cuishan refuses to betray his sworn brother.
| 11 | "Episode 11" | November 17, 1986 |
Yin Susu reveals to her husband that she was the one who paralyzed his third brother ten years ago. Furious and unter tremendous pressure from other martial artists, Zhang Cuishan commits suicide rather than betraying Xie Xun. At the same time, Zhang Wuji's kidnapper sneaks into Wudang and Zhang Sanfeng saves him. However, shortly thereafter, Yin Susu also commits suicide to join her husband in death. Zhang Wuji is injured by Xuanming Divine Palm, and Zhang Sanfeng goes on a journey to look for the cure.
| 12 | "Episode 12" | November 18, 1986 |
Zhang Sanfeng encounters Chang Yuchun, a member of the Ming Cult who is travelling to a doctor named Hu Qingniu. Since Hu Qingniu refuses to cure anyone not belonging to the Ming Cult, Zhang Sanfeng leaves Zhang Wuji in care of Chang Yuchun. On his way there, Zhang Wuji also meets Zhou Ziruo. Zhang Sanfeng brings Zhou Ziruo to the Emei School to be educated there.
| 13 | "Episode 13" | November 19, 1986 |
Granny Golden Flower seeks revenge on Hu Qingniu and sends him a threatening message by hurting many people and sending them to his house. Among the people injured is Ji Xiaofu. Hu Qingniu refuses to treat them but Zhang Wuji is willing, and he treats them back to health.
| 14 | "Episode 14" | November 20, 1986 |
Abbess Miejue finds Ji Xiaofu and kills her for having a child out of wedlock. Granny Golden Flower also arrives and kills Hu Qingniu and his wife. Zhang Wuji goes with Yang Buhui to find her father. On his way, he is deceived by Kunlun School's He Taichong to reveal where Xie Xun is hiding.
| 15 | "Episode 15" | November 21, 1986 |
Zhang Wuji is saved by Yang Xiao and Yang Buhui is reunited with her father. Zhang Wuji continues his journey to Wudang but is again tricked by the Zhu and Wu families to tell them Xie Xun's location.
| 16 | "Episode 16" | November 24, 1986 |
While being pursued by Zhu Changling, Zhang Wuji falls to the Nameless Valley. Inside a cave, he discovers the Nine Yang Manual and studies it. He Taichong visits various martial arts schools to form an alliance against the Ming Cult. Song Qingshu, Song Yuanqiao's son, meets Zhou Zhiruo for the first time and falls in love with her.
| 17 | "Episode 17" | November 25, 1986 |
On his journey, Yang Xiao encounters a girl named Xiaozhao who has been injured. He employs her as a maid. Zhang Wuji finishes learning the Nine Yang Manual and crawls out of the cave. However, he then falls down the valley and breaks both his legs. Yin Li, Granny Golden Flower's disciple and Yin Yewang's daughter, saves his life.
| 18 | "Episode 18" | November 26, 1986 |
After killing Zhu Jiuzhen, Yin Li is detained by Miejue along with Zhang Wuji. Meanwhile, Song Qingshu's advances to Zhou Zhiruo are rejected. Chen Youliang of the Beggars' Gang approaches Song Qingshu and plans to use him for his own glory.
| 19 | "Episode 19" | November 27, 1986 |
The six major schools arrive at Bright Peak to destroy the Ming Cult. Heavenly Eagle Cult decides to put aside their differences and comes to the defense of Ming Cult. Zhang Wuji is kidnapped by Shuobude, who then meets with the other Ming Cult Wanderers. They are then attacked and injured by Cheng Kun.
| 20 | "Episode 20" | November 28, 1986 |
After being injured by Zhang Wuji, Cheng Kun runs away. While pursuing him, Zhang Wuji is helped by Xiaozhao who leads him to the secret passage. He discovers the manual of Gan Kun Reversal Technique and masters it in several hours with the help of the Nine Yang Manual. After mastering the technique, he is able to force his way out of the secret chamber.

=== Episodes 21–40 ===
| No. | Title | Original release date |
|---|---|---|
| 21 | "Episode 21" | December 1, 1986 |
After all Ming Cult members are injured, Zhang Wuji interferes to prevent them from being wiped out by the six major schools. In the process, he is injured by Zhou Zhiruo wielding the Heaven Sword. However, after his five uncles recognize him, they convince the other schools to leave Ming Cult for the time being.
| 22 | "Episode 22" | December 2, 1986 |
Beggars' Gang takes advantage of Ming Cult's temporary weakness to attack them. Zhang Wuji reluctantly accepts the title of Leader of Ming Cult to save lives. They stage an attack to repossess their headquarters from the Beggars' Gang. On their way to retrieve Xie Xun, Zhang Wuji and Ming Cult members find Yin Liting injured in the same way as Yu Daiyan.
| 23 | "Episode 23" | December 3, 1986 |
Zhang Wuji meets a mysterious Yuan princess named Zhao Min. He also discovers a conspiracy to pit the Ming Cult against other schools. He goes to Wudang to warn Zhang Sanfeng.
| 24 | "Episode 24" | December 4, 1986 |
Zhang Wuji asks Zhao Min for the medicine to cure Yu Daiyan and Yin Liting. In return, Zhao Min makes him promise to do three things for her. While recovering from his injuries, Yin Liting is taken care of by Yang Buhui and they fall in love with one another.
| 25 | "Episode 25" | December 5, 1986 |
Yin Liting marries Yang Buhui. Zhao Min kidnaps members of the six major schools at Wanan Temple using Ten-Aroma Muscle-Crippling Powder and plans to make them support the Yuan Dynasty. Cheng Kun is also in cahoots with the Mongolians.
| 26 | "Episode 26" | December 8, 1986 |
Fan Yao, a member of Ming Cult who pretends to work for the Mongolians, kidnaps Chaghan Temur's concubine and blames it on Lu Zhangke to get the antidote against the Ten-Aroma Powder.
| 27 | "Episode 27" | December 9, 1986 |
To get Fan Yao to come down from Wanan Temple, Köke Temur burns down the tower. Zhang Wuji is able to save almost everybody, but Abbess Miejue falls down to her death.
| 28 | "Episode 28" | December 10, 1986 |
Chen Youliang tries to make Song Qingshu rape Zhou Zhiruo. When Mo Shenggu catches him in the act, Chen Youliang makes Song Qingshu kill him. Granny Golden Flower kidnaps Zhou Zhiruo. Zhang Wuji, Zhao Min, and Xiaozhao follow them to save Zhou Zhiruo. They find Granny Golden Flower visiting Xie Xun.
| 29 | "Episode 29" | December 11, 1986 |
Emissaries from the Persian Ming Cult come to take over the Ming Cult in Central Plains. Zhang Wuji helps Xie Xun to defeat them. Yin Li is heavily injured and forsaken by Granny Golden Flower. While trying to escape the island, they take hostage of Persian Ming Cult's Fair King, but the Persians detain Granny Golden Flower.
| 30 | "Episode 30" | December 12, 1986 |
Granny Golden Flower turns out to be Daiqisi and Xiaozhao is her daughter. Xiaozhao agrees to be the new leader of Persian Ming Cult in exchange of letting Zhang Wuji and his friends go free. After everybody spends a night, Zhao Min disappears and the rest of them are weakened by Ten-Aroma Powder. Yin Li dies and is buried by Zhang Wuji.
| 31 | "Episode 31" | December 15, 1986 |
Zhang Wuji encounters Zhao Min again and together they listen to a conversation involving the Beggars' Gang and Song Qingshu. Afterwards, they find the body of Mo Shenggu but his four uncles suspect him of falling under the evil influence of Zhao Min and killing Mo Shenggu.
| 32 | "Episode 32" | December 16, 1986 |
Chen Youliang convinces Song Qingshu to poison his uncles. Zhao Min makes a plan to make Song Qingshu inadvertently confess to be the killer of Mo Shenggu. When his father and uncles hear this from his own mouth, they realize that they have falsely accused Zhang Wuji.
| 33 | "Episode 33" | December 17, 1986 |
When Zhou Zhiruo finds out about a rendezvous between Zhang Wuji and Zhao Min, she becomes upset and tries to commit suicide. Zhang Wuji and Zhou Zhiruo then become engaged and plan to marry. Xie Xun is captured by Cheng Kun and is detained in Shaolin.
| 34 | "Episode 34" | December 18, 1986 |
Zhao Min comes to interrupt Zhang Wuji's wedding with Zhou Zhiruo. After Zhao Min shows him an item that belongs to Xie Xun, Zhang Wuji leaves Zhou Zhiruo at the altar to follow her. Zhou Zhiruo becomes embittered and returns to Emei, followed by Song Qingshu. After failing to convince her to come back, Chaghan Temur disowns Zhao Min as his daughter.
| 35 | "Episode 35" | December 19, 1986 |
Shaolin arranges a Lion Slaying Event. On their way there, Zhang Wuji and Zhao Min stay at Du Baidang and Yi Sanniang's home.
| 36 | "Episode 36" | December 22, 1986 |
Zhang Wuji fights the Three Elders of Bodhidharma Hall to rescue his godfather but Xie Xun refuses to leave. Zhang Wuji also explains Cheng Kun's evil plans to the Three Elders. Cheng Kun kidnaps the Shaolin abbots. After fighting the Three Elders, Yin Tianzheng dies.
| 37 | "Episode 37" | December 23, 1986 |
During the Lion Slaying Event, Zhou Zhiruo tells Zhang Wuji that she has married Song Qingshu. Yu Lianzhou then injures Song Qingshu so badly that he is incapacitated. Zhang Wuji offers to treat Song Qingshu, but he also asks help from Zhou Zhiruo to save his godfather.
| 38 | "Episode 38" | December 24, 1986 |
Zhang Wuji and Zhou Zhiruo both fight the Three Elders and get Xie Xun out of the prison. Xie Xun duels against Cheng Kun and destroys both Cheng Kun's and his own martial powers. Xie Xun explains to Zhang Wuji that it was not Zhao Min but Zhou Zhiruo who poisoned them and killed Yin Li.
| 39 | "Episode 39" | December 29, 1986 |
Yuan soldiers attack Shaolin. Zhang Wuji is appointed to lead the resistance. However, when the Mongolians see Zhao Min, Chaghan Temur hesitates to attack.
| 40 | "Episode 40" | December 30, 1986 |
Köke Temur shoots an arrow at Zhao Min, but Zhou Zhiruo leaps in front of the weapon to save Zhao Min. Zhao Zhiruo gives the Heaven Sword and Dragon Sabre to Zhang Wuji. They are broken and both Nine Yin Manual and the Book of Wumu have been taken out. The Book of Wumu is then used to create a strategy to defeat the Mongolians. Zhang Wuji resigns as the Leader of Ming Cult to be with Zhao Min.
