= Mark Kwok (actor) =

Hong Kong actor (born 1964)

- Born: Kwok Siu Pui 郭紹培 (Traditional) 郭绍培 (Simplified); Guó Xiǎo Péi (Mandarin); Gwok3 Siu3 Peoi4 (Cantonese); 28 October 1964 (age 61); Hong Kong
- Occupation: Actor
- Years active: 1994–2007

Chinese name
- Traditional Chinese: 郭耀明
- Simplified Chinese: 郭耀明
Transcriptions
Standard Mandarin
- Hanyu Pinyin: Guó Yiǎo Míng
Yue: Cantonese
- Jyutping: Gwok3 Yiu6 Ming4

Mark Kwok Yiu Ming (born 28 October 1964) is a former Hong Kong television actor. He made his debut in TVB’s long running series, A Kindred Spirit (1996). Prior to that, he acted in one drama in ATV before moving to TVB.

He left the acting industry in 2007, with his last work being The Ultimate Crime Fighter.

Kwok currently works as an insurance salesman.

== Filmography ==
Year	Title	Role
1994	When Dreams Come True 點解阿sir係隻鬼	
1995	A Kindred Spirit 真情	Gwai Ah Nam 歸亞南
1995	File of Justice 4 壹號皇庭IV	Tommy Cheng Chi Wai 鄭子偉
1996	Cold Blood Warm Heart 天地男兒	
1996	ICAC Investigators 1996 廉政行動1996	Kwok Fat 郭法
1997	The Hitman Chronicles 大刺客	Cheuk Lap 卓立
1997	Justice Sung 狀王宋世傑	Tong Suet Kiu 唐雪喬
1998	Burning Flames 烈火雄心	Yip Sai Fai 葉世輝
1998	The Duke of Mount Deer 鹿鼎記	Cheng Hak Song 鄭克塽
1998	ICAC Investigators 1998 廉政行動1998	Chu Kei-tong 朱紀棠
2000	Time Off 明天不一樣	Nick Chan Lik Hang 陳力行
2001	Colorful Life 錦繡良緣	Cheung Suen Man Boon 長孫文本
2001	Virtues of Harmony 皆大歡喜	Leng Bo 靚寶
2002	A Herbalist Affair 情牽百子櫃	Chung Ching Lung 鍾正龍
2002	Doomed to Oblivion 鄭板橋	Chow Si Jun 周士俊
2002	Slim Chances 我要Fit一Fit	Wing Chung Bong 榮忠邦
2002	Treasure Raiders 蕭十一郎	Lin Sing Bik 連城璧
2003	The King of Yesterday and Tomorrow 九五至尊	Marco
2003	Vilgilante Force 智勇新警界	Howard
2003	Virtues of Harmony II 皆大歡喜 (時裝電視劇)	Richard Lee
2003	In the Realm of Fancy 繾綣仙凡間	Yu Yeuk Tung 庾若冬
2003	Better Halves 金牌冰人	Chun Sun 秦 穆
2003	Seed of Hope 俗世情真	To Wai Chung 杜偉聰
2003	The Driving Power 非常外父	Peter Mak 麥彼得
2004	Twin of Brothers 大唐雙龍傳	Lee Kin Sing 李建成
2004	Hard Fate 翡翠戀曲	Chow Siu Tung 周兆東
2004	Split Second 爭分奪秒	Hung Pui Kei 洪培基
2004	To Catch the Uncatchable 棟篤神探	Chiu Tak Kun 招德勤
2004	Summer Heat 心慌、心郁、逐個捉	Lau Ho Fat 劉可發
2005	The Prince's Shadow 御用閒人	Lau Man Chai 柳文齊
2005	Women on the Run 窈窕熟女	Jacky
2005	Yummy Yummy; Yummy Yummy	Marco
2005	The Charm Beneath 胭脂水粉	Yuen Wing Wah 原永華
2006	Under the Canopy of Love 天幕下的戀人	Martin Law Bo 羅波
2006	Bar Bender 潮爆大狀	Chan Wai Keung 陳偉強
2006	The Dance of Passion 火舞黃沙	Thief 馬賊
2006	Forensic Heroes 法證先鋒	Law Wah Kin 羅華健
2006	Face to Fate 布衣神相	Sung Man Dang 宋晚燈
2007	The Ultimate Crime Fighter 通天幹探	Man Kit (Cool Man) 萬 傑
