= A Road and a Will =

1997 Hong Kong television drama

- Official poster
- 香港人在廣州
- Genre: Drama
- Written by: Kwan Chung-ling
- Starring: Lawrence Cheng; Wayne Lai; Maggie Cheung; Cutie Mui; Claudia Lau; Wallis Pang
- Theme music composer: Robert Seng
- Opening theme: Warm Up the Body (熱身) by Julian Cheung
- Country of origin: Hong Kong
- Original language: Cantonese
- No. of episodes: 20

Production
- Producer: Amy Wong
- Production locations: Hong Kong; Guangzhou, Guangdong, China
- Camera setup: Multi camera
- Production company: TVB

Original release
- Network: TVB Jade
- Release: 26 May – 20 June 1997

A Road and a Will
- Traditional Chinese: 香港人在廣州
- Simplified Chinese: 香港人在广州
- Literal meaning: "Hong Kong people in Guangzhou"
Transcriptions
Standard Mandarin
- Hanyu Pinyin: Xiānggǎngrén Zài Guǎngzhōu
Yue: Cantonese
- Yale Romanization: Hēunggóngyàhn joih Gwóngjāu
- Jyutping: Heong1gong2jan4 Zoi6 Gwong2zau1

A Road and a Will is a 1997 Hong Kong television drama produced by TVB and starring Lawrence Cheng, Wayne Lai, Maggie Cheung Ho-yee and Cutie Mui. The series was broadcast on TVB Jade from 26 May to 20 June 1997 and was re-aired several times in June 1999, March 2004 and August 2007.

== Plot ==
A drama depicting the struggle of Sam (Lawrence Cheng), a senior executive in Hong Kong who has been laid off unexpectedly, in starting a business in Guangzhou. Sam was torn apart when his wife, Chow Mo-chi (Claudia Lau) prompted him with a divorce after he lost his job. Distressed, he decided to go to Guangzhou for a new start and retracts his ancestral house. There, he lands in a dispute with a local merchant named Ng Kin-ngai (Wayne Lai). Fortunately, with the help of Mo-chi's cousin, Chai Ho-fung (Maggie Cheung), Sam and Kin-ngai finally come to terms with each other.

The story then goes on to portray the change of attitude of Sam towards the people in Guangzhou from prejudice to appreciation and harmony.

== Cast ==
=== The Yue family (Hong Kong) ===
- Lawrence Cheng as Sam Yue Wing-tit (余穎鐵), The second son of the Yue family, who is a toy designer that has designed many action figures and games. Due his lack of the heart to fight, his boss fired him saying that he is not working hard enough. He then goes to Guangzhou, China, where he is not fond of, with the identity of a Hong Kong businessman of make-up products, and marries Chow Mo-chi in back in Hong Kong. Later in China, he develops a relationship with Chai Ho-fung, but later things changed when marriage was being discussed.
- Claudia Lau as Chris Chow Mo-chi (周慕慈), Sam's wife who is a smart and profession type woman. Due to Sam going to Guangzhou to develop his career, they divorced. The relationship then goes on and off but finally reconciled in the end.
- Cho Tat-wah as Yue Yung (余勇), Sam's father
- Carlo Ng as Yue Wing-sek (余穎錫), Sam's youngest brother who is greatly loved by his father. He studies at the Guangzhou Keinan College. During the peak of his education, his friend invited him to go into business and thus he abandoned his education.
- Josie Ho as Yue Wing-kam (余穎金), Sam's younger sister
- Ching Siu-lung as Yue Wing-kong (余穎鋼), Sam's older brother
- Cho Chung as Chu Ying Hung (朱映紅), Wing-kong's wife who has knowledge of make-up products and once helped Sam on his business.
- Tse Man-hin as Yue Tung (余銅), Wing-kong and Hung's son

=== The Wang family (China) ===
- Wayne Lai as Wu Jianyi (吳堅毅), a flower land merchant from Chen Village, Shunde and speaks with a strong Shundeness accent. Due to his village leader collecting his land, he moved to Guangzhou and met Sam Yue. Had a dispute with Sam when he rented Sam's ancestral home for operating business. Due to the failure of the China stock market, he and Sam became friends and they both operate a business of flower and plants. He has unsuccessfully tried to pursue Yue Wing-lam and his cousin, Chai Kefeng.
- Cutie Mui as Wang Huang (王凰), Jianyi's childhood friend who is a kind village girl who is rigid in love. She loves Kin-ngai but due to her personality, she was always reprimanded by him. She and Kin-ngai marries in the end.
- Gordon Liu as Wang Lingfu (王令富), Huang's father who wears black framed glasses and likes to sing songs about the Cultural Revolution and saying the slogan.

=== The Chai family (China) ===
The Chai family and Ng family are relatives.

- Maggie Cheung Ho-yee as Chai Kefeng (柴可風), who has a standard look and works in the bank and is Guangzhou's new generation of female. She helped his cousin in-law Sam gain back his ancestral home and thus, meeting him. She and Sam develop and relationship and was almost in talks of marriage but she believes she is the third party in Sam and Mo-chi's marriage and thus she left.
- Hou Guanqun as Chai Jinggang (柴井崗), Kefeng's father
- Miu Kam Fung as Zhang Sanyan (張三燕), Kefeng's mother
- Wallis Pang as Chai Kegui (柴可貴), Kefeng's younger sister

=== P&D Toy Company ===
- Ben Wong as Gordon, Sam's superior
- Bruce Li as Ben, Sam's colleague
- Timothy Siu as Chicken, Sam's colleague

=== Other cast ===
- Joe Ma as Peter, Mo-chi's superior.
- Hoyan Mok as Amigo, Mo-chi's good friend.
