= Johnny Ngan =

Hong Kong actor (1949–2024)

- Born: 17 May 1953; British Hong Kong
- Died: 25 May 2024 (aged 71); Kowloon, Hong Kong
- Occupation: Actor
- Years active: 1980–2024

Chinese name
- Traditional Chinese: 顏國樑
- Simplified Chinese: 颜国梁
Transcriptions
Standard Mandarin
- Hanyu Pinyin: Yán Guó Liáng
Yue: Cantonese
- Jyutping: Ngaan4 Gwok3 Leong4
- Musical career
- Also known as: 積少 (Young Master Jack); Antony Ngan; Kwok-Leung Ngan

Johnny Ngan Kwok Leung (Chinese: 顏國樑, 17 May 1953 – 26 May 2024) was a Hong Kong film and television actor. He worked for ATV from 1980 to 1981, before joining TVB.

== Acting career ==
Johnny Ngan earned his nickname "Young Master Jack (積少)" after appearing in his first TVB drama Hong Kong 81 as "Jack Chan (陳積)". In 1987, he acted in The Seasons, a popular drama series shown during Enjoy Yourself Tonight.

From 1995 to 1999, he acted in the hit TVB soap opera A Kindred Spirit. His performance as the middle-aged "Chan Tai Sing (陳大勝)" attracted young viewers' attention. After this drama, he started to appear in more dramas with more screen time.

Aside from dramas, he also appeared in the popular variety show, Enjoy Yourself Tonight and a few Hong Kong films. On the set of The Seasons, there was a scene in which his onscreen wife (portrayed by Meg Lam) was to slap him. Lam slapped him too hard, which caused injury to his neck. Ngan was hospitalised for a month.

Ngan revealed in 2021 that he left TVB in the summer of 2008 due to complicated relationships with company higher-ups, causing him to feel "disheartened".

== Personal life and death ==
Ngan was a practitioner of tai chi. He later worked as a tai chi instructor. Ngan died from a pneumonia-induced shortness of breath on May 25, 2024 in Queen Elizabeth Hospital, Hong Kong, at the age of 71.

== Filmography ==
=== TVB dramas ===
Year	Title	Role	Notes
1981	Hong Kong 81 香港八一	Jack Chan 陳積	
1987	The Seasons 季節	Tong Ka Wai 唐家偉	
1989	The Seasons II 金裝季節	Tong Ka Wai 唐家偉	
1990	Super Millionaire 富貴超人		TV show on TVB
1991	Be My Guest 我愛玫瑰園	Fan Tung 范統	
1992	File of Justice 壹號皇庭		
1993	The Buddhism Palm Strikes Palm 如來神掌再戰江湖	東島長離	
1993	Folk Sergeant 妙探出更	Tang Ka On 鄧家安	
1995	A Kindred Spirit 真情	Chan Tai Sing 陳大勝	From 1995 to 1999
2000	Return of the Cuckoo 十月初五的月光	Chuen Hoi King 全海景	Formerly known as "澳門街"
2001	In the Realm of Success 公私戀事多	Chu Moon Tong 朱滿堂	
2001	Virtues of Harmony 皆大歡喜	Shek Tai Chuen 石大川	2001–2002
2003	Virtues of Harmony II 皆大歡喜	Shek Tai Chuen 石大川	2003–2005
2006	Land of Wealth 滙通天下	Fung Ying Chun 馮應春	
2006	The Bitter Bitten 人生馬戲團	Ling Tai Chi 凌大志	
2007	A Change of Destiny 天機算	Yue Tak Wai 余德維	
2007	On the First Beat 學警出更	Choi Lei Kan 蔡利勤	
2008	A Journey Called Life 金石良緣	Cho Tim 曹添	
2008	Speech of Silence 甜言蜜語	Wan Chow Wai 尹秋穗	
2009	Burning Flame III 烈火雄心III	Yeung Ping Kei 楊炳基	
2009	The Beauty of the Game 美麗高解像	Lee Chuen Hoi 李泉開	

=== ATV dramas ===
Year	Title	Role	Notes
1980	Gone With Wind 浮生六劫	Lawyer Ngan 顏律師	Debut
1980	Man in Society 人在江湖	ICAC investigator ICAC調查員	
1981	Big Coma 大昏迷	Lawyer Kwong 鄺律師	
1981	Woman's Action 女媧行動	Killer 殺手	

=== Films ===
Year	Title	Role	Notes
1981	No U Turn 不准掉頭	Jimmy's friend Jimmy朋友	
1981	The Cold Blooded Murderer 綠印		
1983	Mad, Mad 83 瘋狂83	Jack Chan 陳積	Reprises his role as Jack Chan from Hong Kong 81
1984	Host for a Ghost 好彩撞到你		
1987	Project A Part II; A計劃續集	Policeman #201	
1988	Chatter Street Killer 點指賊賊	George Lee 李佐治	
1988	Mother vs. Mother 南北媽打	Producer Tsang 曾監製	
1989	Lucky Guy 福星臨門	Chu 朱	
1990	Fortune Chasers 爛賭財神		
1990	Perfect Girls 靚足100分	Lam Tin Chi's boss 林天賜老板	
1992	Devil's Love 性奴		
2000	The Hong Kong Happy Man 賤男人週記	Wai Siu Po 韋小寶	
