= Virtues of Harmony II =

- Promo poster Back Row (left to right): Stephanie Che, Johnny Tang, Michael Tse, and Louis Yuen; Third Row (left to right): Lau Dan; Second Row (left to right): Bernice Liu, Frankie Lam, Nancy Sit, and Kingdom Yuen; Front Row (left to right): Joyce Chen, Cutie Mui, Bondy Chiu, and Yvonne Lam
- 皆大歡喜 (時裝版)
- Genre: Modern Sitcom
- Starring: Nancy Sit; Frankie Lam; Michael Tse; Joyce Chen; Kingdom Yuen; Bondy Chiu; Louis Yuen; Yvonne Lam; Cutie Mui; Johnny Tang; Bernice Liu; Lau Dan; Stephanie Che; Joseph Lee; Johnny Ngan; Helen Ma
- Opening theme: "Virtues of Harmony" (皆大歡喜) by Nancy Sit
- Ending theme: "寸草心" by Nancy Sit
- Country of origin: Hong Kong
- Original language: Cantonese
- No. of episodes: 443

Production
- Running time: 20 minutes (approx.)

Original release
- Network: TVB
- Release: May 5, 2003 – January 21, 2005

Related
- Virtues of Harmony (2001-2002)

The Virtues of Harmony II is a long-running TVB television series, which follows its first series, Virtues of Harmony, a series set in Imperial China. It stars Nancy Sit, Frankie Lam, Michael Tse, Joyce Chen, Bondy Chiu, Cutie Mui, Louis Yuen, Yvonne Lam, Johnny Tang, Bernice Liu, Lau Dan, Stephanie Che, Joseph Lee, Hawick Lau, Johnny Ngan, Helen Ma, Timmy Hung, Sherming Yiu, Kingdom Yuen & Maggie Shiu. This new, second series of the Virtues of Harmony is set in Modern Hong Kong.

== Show statistics ==
- Chinese Title: 皆大歡喜
- English Title: Virtues of Harmony II (Modern Version)
- Chinese Pinyin Title: Gai Dai Foon Hei (Cantonese), Jie Da Huan Xi (Mandarin)
- Vietnamese Title: Tình Người Hiện Ðại
- Released: May 2003 (Hong Kong) || June 2003 (Chinese) || September 2003 (Viet)
- Episodes/Tapes Length: 443/111 (Chinese) || 296/148 (Viet)
- Producer: Tsui Yu On
- Genre: Modern Comedy/Light Drama
- Year: 2003-2005
- Company: TVB

== Cast ==
| Nancy Sit | Bondy Chiu | Cutie Mui | Yvonne Lam | Joyce Chen |
| Frankie Lam | Bernice Liu | Michael Tse | Louis Yuen | Johnny Tang |
| Joseph Lee | Kingdom Yuen | Helen Ma | Johnny Ngan | Stephanie Che |
| Lau Dan | Steven Ma | Hawick Lau | Linda Chung | Chan Man Na |
| Lam King Kong | Yu Yeung | Rain Lau | Sugar Yau | Josephine Sam |
| Albert Lo | Lam Wing Tung | Robert Siu | Teresa Ha | Yu Mo Lin |

Kam Family
| Cast | Role | Notes |
|---|---|---|
| Nancy Sit | Yau Nim Chi | Retired police officer, owner of Tung Mut Yuen Widow of Kam Wah, sister-in-law of Kam Sa Sa Step-mother of Kam Nin, Kam Yuet, and Kam Yat Mother of Lau Ka Sing (reunited) |
| Kingdom Yuen | Kam Sa Sa | Co owns Tung Mut Yuen Younger sister of Kam Wah, sister-in-law of Yau Nim Chi Aunt of Kam Nin, Kam Yuet, and Kam Yat |
| Frankie Lam | Kam Nin | Merchandising manager at a fashion company Son of Kam Wah and Law Tin Fu Elder brother of Kam Yuet and Kam Yat Step-son of Yau Nim Chi and nephew of Kam Sa Sa Enemy of Man Kwai Fei (Departed on episode 187 to work in Shanghai, came back in episode 243 and departed again on episode 247) |
| Michael Tse | Kam Yuet | Merchandiser at Ka Yan Company Son of Kam Wah and Law Tin Fu Younger brother of Kam Nin and older brother of Kam Yat Step-son of Yau Nim Chi and nephew of Kam Sa Sa Lam Yuk Lo's boyfriend later husband and colleague |
| Joyce Chen | Kam Yat | Actress Daughter of Kam Wah and Law Tin Fu Younger sister of Kam Nin and Kam Yuet Step-daughter of Yau Nim Chi and niece of Kam Sa Sa Good friend of neighbor Shek Mei Ko Yee Hong's girlfriend |
| Louis Yuen | Lau Gam/Law Tin Fu | Background actor "Extras" later office boy at Ka Yan Company Long-lost younger brother of Law Tin Fu Maternal uncle of Kam Nin, Kam Yuet, and Kam Yat Kitty's boyfriend |
| Hawick Lau | Lau Ka Sing/Ah Sing | (Appears in episode 232) Yau Nim Chi's long-lost son with Kam Wah Older brother of Kam Nin, Kam Yuet, and Kam Yat Designer at Ka Yan Company |

Shek Family
| Cast | Role | Notes |
|---|---|---|
| Cutie Mui | Shek Mui | Works at Ka Yan Company Daughter of Shek Tai Chuen and Chan Kiu, niece of Shek Tai Kei, cousin of Ko Hee Yong Neighbor of Kam family, has crush on Kam Yuet Good friend of colleague Lam Yuk Lo and neighbor Kam Yat (Departed on episode 229 to study abroad) |
| Helen Ma | Chan Kiu | Works at Tung Mut Yuen Wife of Shek Tai Chuen and mother of Shek Mui Sister-in-law of Shek Tai Kei and aunt of Ko Hee Yong |
| Johnny Ngan | Shek Tai Chuen | Works at Tung Mut Yuen Husband of Chan Kiu and father of Shek Mui Older brother of Shek Tai Kei and uncle of Ko Hee Yong |
| Joseph Lee | Shek Tai Kei | Actor AKA: Man Kok Ke/ 十一哥 Father of Ko Hee Yong Younger brother of Shek Tai Chuen, brother-in-law of Chan Kiu, and uncle of Shek Mui |
| Johnny Tang | Ko Hee Yong | Designer at Ka Yan Company Son of Shek Tai Kei, nephew of Shek Tai Chuen and Chan Kiu, cousin and colleague of Shek Mui Kam Yat's boyfriend |

Ka Yan Company
| Cast | Role | Notes |
|---|---|---|
| Lau Dan | Roger (Wong Seung) | Owner of Ka Yan Company Father to Wong Yee |
| Bondy Chiu | Kelly (Lam Yuk Lo) | Merchandiser at Ka Yan Company Girlfriend later wife of Kam Yuet Good friend of colleague Shek Mui |
| Stephanie Che | Athena (Man Kwai Fei) | Merchandising manager at Ka Yan Company Enemy of Kam Nin |
| Bernice Liu | Joey (Wong Yee) | Designer at Ka Yan Company Works for Kam Nin product line Eventually girlfriend of Kam Nin Daughter to Wong Seung (Departed on episode 187) |
| Sugar Yau | Sugar (Cheung Hoi Tong) | Accounting clerk at Ka Yan Company |
| Josephine Sam | Gigi (Lee Gui Gee) | Shipping clerk at Ka Yan Company |
| Rain Lau | Lily (Chan Bak Hap) | Man Kwai Fei's secretary Catch phrase: Sure啦 |
| Yvonne Lam | Kitty/Ok 姐 | Secretary to Wong Seung Friends with Lam Yuk Lo, Shek Mui, Kam Yat Girlfriend of Lau Gam |

== Gueststars ==
| Lawrence Yan | Myolie Wu | Deno Cheung | Chan Ling Lei | Tang Chi Fung |
| Lai Lok Yi | Griselda Yeung | Nancy Wu | Rebecca Chan | Ellesmere Choi |
| Wai Ka Hung | Karen Lee | Matt Yeung | Cindy Au | Wong Chak Fung |
| Claire Yiu | Iva Lo | Gilbert Lam | Maria Chen | Lai Suen |
| Amy Ang | Lo Yuen Yan | Jessica Chung | Law Hok Lam | Stephanie Wang |
| Chiu Ching Yee | Ivy Tam | Jacky Wong | Patricia Liu | Sam Chan |
| Jaffery Wong | Mimi Chu Mi Mi | Ronald Cheng | Mark Kwok | Mary Hon |
| Angela Tong | Chan San Chung | Rubyanne Choi | Halina Tam | Rachel Kan |

== Couples within the show ==
- Frankie Lam & Bernice Liu
- Michael Tse & Bondy Chiu
- Johnny Tang & Joyce Chen
- Steven Ma & Linda Chung
- Louis Yuen & Yvonne Lam
- Lee Kwok Lun & Kingdom Yuen
- Johnny Ngan & Helen Ma
- Yu Yeung & Chan Man Na

== Special awards and achievements ==
- TVB Anniversary 2001 Top 13 Favorite Roles... Nancy Sit (Yau Nim Chi)
- TVB Anniversary 2002 Favorite Couple/Group Award... Bondy Chiu, Joyce Chen, Yvonne Lam, Cutie Mui
- Next TV Awards 2002 Top 10 Programmes... #5 Virtues of Harmony (Ancient Version)
- Next TV Awards 2003 Top 10 Programmes... #10 Virtues of Harmony (Ancient Version)
- Next TV Awards 2004 Top 10 Programmes... #8 Virtues of Harmony II (Modern Version)
- Next TV Awards 2005 Top 10 Programmes... #7 Virtues of Harmony II (Modern Version)
- Fairchild TV Top 10 Dramas In Last 10 Years... Virtues of Harmony (Ancient Version)
- Astro Wai Lai Toi Drama Award 2004 Favorite Character... Nancy Sit (Yau Nim Chi)
- Metro Radio Black and White Television Characters Awards 2004... Nancy Sit (Yau Nim Chi)
- TVB Weekly Magazine Popular Show... Virtues of Harmony II (Modern Version)
- Longest TVB Costume Series... Virtues of Harmony I (327 episodes)
- #2 Longest TVB Modern Series... Virtues of Harmony II (443 episodes)
- #2 Longest TVB Drama... Virtues of Harmony (I & II) (770 episodes)

== Storyline Overview ==
The second series of The Virtues of Harmony follows on from the happy ending of the first series. The family makes a wish on a wishing tree to live together into eternity, for ever and ever. Their wish come true, and they live on from the Ming Dynasty, pass the Qing dynasty, past the World Wars, past Depression and Strike and War and Conflict and end up now in the modern world. Yau Nim Chi (Nancy Sit) has become the owner of a HK style cafe which called "Tung Mut Yuen"(the Cantonese homophone of "Zoo"), Chi was a police officer in her youth and after marrying the "Tung Mut Yuen" cafe owner Kam Wah, she left her position to look after the three young children that Wah had with his previous wife. The eldest son was Kam Nin (Frankie Lam), second son Kam Yuet (Michael Tse) and youngest daughter Kam Yat (Joyce Chen) (their names are Chinese puns of "this year", "this month", and "this day", respectively), and although they were not borne from Chi, they see her as their natural mother and the family lived together harmoniously. After Wah died, Chi took on the role of father and together with Wah's sister Kam Sa Sa (Kingdom Yuen), they continued to look after the cafe and although it is a small business, they had a comfortable life; eighteen years later, Nin, Yuet and Yat have grown up and each has their own successes.

Eldest son Kam Nin works in a fashion company as Merchandising Manager and although he is appreciated by his manager Wong Sheung, he is considered as competition by another Merchandising Manager in Ka Yan Company, Man Kwai Fei. The two have their own stances and in work are always fighting to beat each other, whilst the smooth and cunning Sheung watches over but does nothing, so as to allow the two to show their talents whilst he reaps all the rewards. Sheung has an only daughter Wong Yee or Joey who has been spoiled from an early age and has never been through any hardship and studied fashion design at a top school in England. On one occasion, when returning to Hong Kong on vacation, she gave up her studies for the sake of an argument and decided to find herself a job, Sheung is very concerned that her naivety will lead her to be tricked, so he secretly arranges for her to work in his company and they reach an agreement that they will keep their connections a secret as she is sent to be a fashion designer in his company. With no social experience, Yee sees her work as a plaything and is forever leaving her work to the very last moment before the deadlines, causing much frustration for Nin, who does everything by the rule book and wants to fire Yee, at this time, Sheung steps in to say that she has a three-year contract with them and he cannot fire her, Nin doesn't know whether to laugh or cry. But Nin had fallen in love with Joey at first sight because he was mesmerized by her sweet sincere smile. He never knew that he would see her again at Ka Yan Company working under him! They had some ups and downs with Joey mistaking Nin of being a rude and uptight person when he tried to reason with her to take her job seriously. However, Joey soon learned that Nin is actually a sweet, nice, and thoughtful guy and this is when she started to have feelings for him. Through misunderstandings, they finally got together. Unfortunately, the day when they first became a couple, Joey got into a car accident and lost only her memories of Ah Nin. The last thing she remembered of Nin was that she hated him and that Nin is a horrible person. At this time, Joey's admirer who is also Nin's best friend, Sam came back from his work. He realized the situation Joey is in and took advantage of that. He persuaded Joey that they were a couple and Nin is also trying to stop them from being together. Although Joey trusted his lie, she have dreams of Nin, but doesn't see his face in the dream. Soon, she realized that she is starting to have feelings for Nin all over again, but doesn't know what to do with Sam. She became confused with Nin and Sam and decided to go to England to free her thoughts. At the airport, the last thing she did was call Nin and tell him she is leaving, but she received his voicemail. This was because at the same time, he was trying to call her. They were both at the airport though they missed each other there. Nin was sad and decided to quit his job at Ka Yan Company and go to Shanghai to freshen his mind as he can never love another woman like Joey again. Besides, Ka Yan only reminded him more of his love. Thus, the couple split and never came back.

Second son Kam Yuet also works in Ka Yan Company as a Merchandiser but he is under the supervision of Nin's nemesis Fei, who sees him as a problem and takes every opportunity to criticize his work. Yuet has a girlfriend in the company who is also a Merchandiser called Lam Yuk Lo (Bondy Chiu), Lo has always seen Yuet as a likely candidate for marriage and is very controlling over him, but he is willing to bear with this. Lo is very petty and is a little woman and has a sworn sister at work Shek Mei (Cutie Mui). Although the two have differing personalities, when Lo joined the company three years ago she quickly became good friends with Mei, who has been neighbours with Yuet since she was young. Mei's parents Shek Tai Chuen (Johnny Ngan) and Chan Kiu (Helen Ma) are old workers at Tung Mat Yuen so Mei grew up with the three Kam siblings and is particularly close to Yat with whom she often discusses her feelings. Yat has seen very early on that Mei is attracted to Yuet, but she has never let on her feelings to him and when she saw that Lo started dating Yuet after joining the company, then she can only put her feelings away in her heart. Because Yat is aware of Mei's feelings for Yuet, she does not have any good feelings towards her sister-in-law-to-be and often argues with her.

Kam Yat has had a love for acting since she was very young and after her A-levels, she entered the TV station's acting school, after graduating she has only had bit parts in her shows, but this has not waned her enthusiasm towards acting and because she is immersed in the world of the media, she has seen many faces of human nature and she has a deep hatred for those people who mask their true selves and have fake personalities. Ko Yee Hong is a designer at Ka Yan Company and also Yat's neighbour and his appearance and character gives people the impression that he is a homosexual, but Yat is adamant to go against these opinions by saying that Hong is just pretending to be gay so that girls will put their guard down and he can take advantage of them, she vows to break through this false image of his. In reality, Hong is not really homosexual, but he is also not as Yat thinks pretending to be gay to take advantage of girls, it is actually just that Hong is very picky and petty and a lover of beauty and perfection which makes him give people the wrong impression about his sexuality, including his natural father Shek Tai Kei.

Kei is the brother of Shek Tai Chuen, with an artiste name of Man Wong Kei he was a star of the films of the seventies where his first film gained him Best Actor award at the Sri Lanka Film Festival and gained him a period of notoriety. At the time, Kei was brainwashed by his success and he threw away the present given to him by his devoted fan Kam Sa Sa, she found out about his bad behaviour and changed her opinions on Kei, until this day Kei's career has taken a downward turn and now takes on the odd role for "mature" actors at the TV station, Kei still doesn't know that that fan who he hurt so many years ago is the same Sa who is the neighbour who keeps arguing against him.

It is not only Kei who is not at peace with Sa, there is also Wan Ying Gei who was a high school classmate of hers, at the time the two were like sisters, but later they became enemies and after so many years, they treated each other as strangers until later Gei married into the Kam family and became their Auntie and the reason for their disharmony is finally revealed. (The reason they became enemies was because their classmates held a voting to see who would die still virgin and with no future. When Sa and Gei found out that they were the only finalists for this, they got scared. In order to not let themselves win the award for being "lo goo por" or "old maid" in the future, they voted for the other self. When both found out that the other betrayed the other, they became very furious and became sworn enemies).

For twenty years, Chi has watched her children grow up and worked with Sa to manage the cafe and take it to its current success and she takes pride in this. However, Chi has still one wish unfulfilled and that is to find Law Tin Fu, who is the brother of the three children's natural mother Law Bing. When Fu was lost, he was only a baby and Chi only knows that he had a birthmark on his body and has no other way of recognizing him, so after so many years she has not had any news of him.

On the day of Chi's 48th birthday, after an incident with an error in a tenancy contract, an unwanted guest arrives at the Kam Family who is nasty tenant Lau Gam (Louis Yuen). Gam's irresponsible behaviour causes much trouble for the Kams. Eventually, as a result of a major argument with the family, they find that Gam is their long lost uncle of thirty years Law Tin Fu and the tranquility of the Kam family is about to be met with some great waves!
