= Sunshine of My Life =

2022 Hong Kong film by Judy Chu

- Theatrical release poster
- Chinese: 一路瞳行
- Directed by: Judy Chu
- Screenplay by: Judy Chu
- Produced by: Local Production; Mandarin Motion Pictures; Film Development Fund; Create Hong Kong
- Starring: Kara Hui; Karena Ng; Hugo Ng; Angus Yeung; Janis Chan
- Cinematography: Tam Ka-ho
- Edited by: Cheng Wai-Lin
- Music by: Cheung Siu-hung
- Distributed by: Mandarin Motion Pictures
- Release date: September 15, 2022 (Hong Kong)
- Running time: 96 minutes
- Country: Hong Kong
- Language: Cantonese
- Budget: HK$4.85 million

Sunshine of My Life (Chinese: 一路瞳行) is a 2022 Hong Kong drama film directed by Judy Chu and adapted from the director's own family story. It tells the story of a blind father who gives birth to a sighted daughter. The film stars Kara Hui, Karena Ng, Hugo Ng, Angus Yeung, and Janis Chan. The film was shortlisted for the 19th Hong Kong Asia Film Financing Forum and received HK$2.39 million in funding from the Film Development Fund's "Film Production Financing Scheme". The film title is pronounced the same as Tong in Cantonese and also means "walking together". Disney has acquired the exclusive rights to the film and will stream it exclusively on Disney+ in Hong Kong on February 11, 2023, at 9:30 pm. Disney Media's Star Movies (Hong Kong) will also stream it on 2023.

== Synopsis ==
Chu Chin-yan (played by Karena Ng), a girl with bright eyes, has blind parents: Kam Siu-hung (played by Kara Hui) and Chu Kwok-keung (played by Hugo Ng). From a young age, the obedient and sensible girl has become her parents' eyes, depicting the shapes and colors of the world for them. As she enters puberty, her love of painting and exceptional talent lead her to aspire to study art abroad. Clashing viewpoints and frequent arguments bring the family atmosphere to a freezing point. When opportunity knocks, what choice will Chin-yan make between family and her dreams?

== Cast ==
- Kara Hui as Kam Siu-hung
- Karena Ng as Chu Chin-yan
- Hugo Ng as Chu Kwok-keung
- Angus Yeung as Ryan
- Janis Chan as Miss Chan

== Production ==
While she was an acting student at the Hong Kong Academy of Performing Arts more than 10 years before the film's release, director Judy Chu, penned the script. Chu, whose parents are blind, was motivated by the feeling evoked from the microaggressions they experienced. The 2014 15-minute short, Undernourished?, was developed from her script. The Incubator for Film and Visual media (Ifva) festival chose the film in 2014, while the Toronto Reel Asian International Film Festival chose it the following year. Chu chose to expand it into a feature film after receiving positive feedback from viewers. To develop the script, Chu partnered with the playwright and director Raymond Wong Pak-ming.

== Reception ==
Edmund Lee of the South China Morning Post said that although the film's "unmistakably positive outlook" could come across as "a little cloying" to certain people, if they see past that, they "may just find a bittersweet little gem at its core".
