= Tung Wah Charity Show =

Hong Kong charity television show

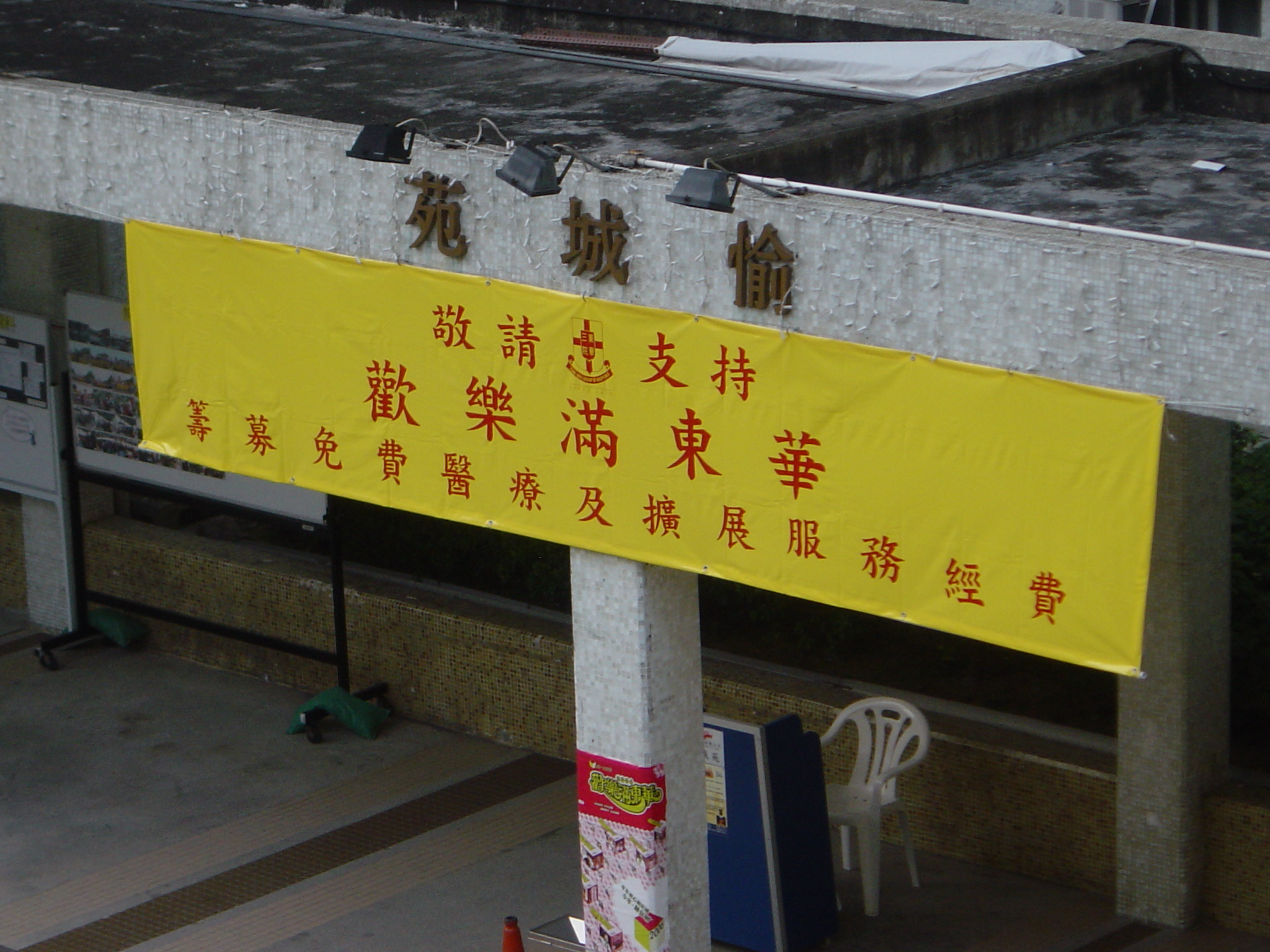
A banner hanged in an estate asking for monetary support.

Tung Wah Charity Show (Chinese: 歡樂滿東華) is a long-running charity television show raising funds for Tung Wah Group of Hospitals in Hong Kong which started in 1979. It is organised by Television Broadcasts Limited (TVB) annually on a Saturday or Sunday in December. It started from a charity show in the entertainment show Enjoy Yourself Tonight (EYT).

Unlike other charity shows on Hong Kong television, it runs during prime time until 12am (because evening news broadcast at this time). The show resumes immediately after the late news and ends at 2 am. The total amount of time on air is 6.5 hours. Cantonese opera is the core of the show. The master San Ma Shi Tsang was the famous one performed a section of Cantonese opera every year until his death in 1997 and was crowned as the king of charity singer (慈善伶王). Other performance like acrobats and singing has been seen on the show.

Many stunts performed in the charity show are record holder of Guinness World Records.

Various English translation of the show name:

- Tung Wah Charity Gala
- Tung Wah Charity Show
- Tung Wah Hospital Annual Charity Show
- Tung Wah Hospitals Charity Evening
- Tung Wah Night
- Tung Wah Show

The Chinese name means Joy fills Tung Wah. In 1986, due to the death of former Hong Kong Governor Edward Youde from a heart attack in his office in Beijing, the Chinese name changed to 愛心滿東華 (lit. Love fills Tung Wah) since it was hardly any joy at that moment.

Although there are many TV charity shows following Tung Wah, they are hardly comparable to its influence on Hong Kong culture. Its name and its theme song is often deemed as the symbol of charity.

== Program information ==
Date	Master of Ceremony	Amount raised (HKD)
14 December 2002	Lydia Shum, Liza Wang, Eric Tsang, Priscilla Ku, Jerry Lamb, Vinci Wong, Cutie Mui, Louisa Wong, Tiffany Lam	$71,888,888
13 December 2003	Lydia Shum, Eric Tsang, Priscilla Ku, Jerry Lamb, Vinci Wong, Cutie Mui, Carlo Ng, Mandy Cho	$73,888,888
11 December 2004	Lydia Shum, Liza Wang, Eric Tsang, Nancy Sit, Patrick Dunn, Lee Ho Lam, Vinci Wong, Amigo Choi	$76,288,888
10 December 2005	Liza Wang, Lydia Shum, Nancy Sit, Cutie Mui, Eric Tsang, Patrick Dunn, Vinci Wong, Stephen Au	$81,878,333
9 December 2006	Liza Wang, Nancy Sit, Cutie Mui, Anna Yau Hoi Man, Eric Tsang, Patrick Dunn, Vinci Wong, Jerry Lamb	$82,388,888
8 December 2007	Liza Wang, Natalis Chan, Nancy Sit, Cutie Mui, Patrick Dunn, Anna Yau Hoi Man, Lee Ho Lam, Wong Yee Hing	$83,388,888
13 December 2008	Liza Wang, Eric Tsang, Susanna Kwan, Bill Chan Shek Sau, Margie Tsang, Cutie Mui, Patrick Dunn, Anna Yau Hoi Man, Lee Ho Lam	$85,188,888
12 December 2009	Liza Wang, Eric Tsang, Margie Tsang, Patrick Dunn, Cutie Mui, Carlo Ng, Meini Cheung, Angel Sung Chih Ling	$85,833,333
11 December 2010	Liza Wang, Eric Tsang, Margie Tsang, Patrick Dunn, Cutie Mui, Carlo Ng, Koni Lui, Jason Chan, Leung Ka Ki, Marcus Kwok	$86,888,888
