= Cutie Mui =

Hong Kong actress

Toto Mui
- Born: April 17, 1966 (age 59)
- Years active: ATV (1986); TVB (1989-2004)
- Family: Mui Siu-ching

Chinese name
- Traditional Chinese: 梅小惠
- Simplified Chinese: 梅小惠
Transcriptions
Standard Mandarin
- Hanyu Pinyin: Méi Xiǎohuì
Yue: Cantonese
- Jyutping: mui4 siu2 wai6

Toto Mui Siu-wai (born April 17, 1966) is a Hong Kong actress and television host associated with Television Broadcasts Limited. Her notable roles include Sek Mei in Virtues of Harmony and Loose Head Zhi in Justice of Life.

Her older sister is TVB producer, Mui Siu-ching. In the mid-nineties, Mui had a long-term relationship with fellow TVB actor Savio Tsang. After 13 years together, the couple broke up in 1999.

== Filmography ==
- The Seasons (1987–1989)
- My Father's Son (1988)
- The Legend of Master Chan (1989)
- Looking Back In Anger (1989)
- The Final Combat (1989)
- Two of a Kind (1989)
- Everybody Loves Somebody (1989)
- Justice Of Life (1989)
- Song Bird (1989)
- Where I Belong (1990)
- No Risk, No Gain (1990)
- The Big Family (1991)
- The Commandments (1992)
- The Key Man (1992)
- Being Twins (1992)
- From Act to Act (1995)
- Good Match from Heaven (1995)
- Night Journey (1996)
- Working Women (1997)
- Show Time Blues (1997)
- A Road and a Will (1997)
- As Sure As Fate (1998)
- A Matter of Business (1999)
- Life for Life (1999)
- When Dreams Come True (2000)
- Colourful Life (2001)
- Virtues of Harmony (2001–2003)
- Virtues of Harmony II (2003–2005, Cutie left in 2004)
- Short of Love (2009)
