= Clean My Name, Mr. Coroner! =

2000 Hong Kong film by James Yuen

- Film poster
- Traditional Chinese: 救薑刑警
- Simplified Chinese: 救姜刑警
- Hanyu Pinyin: Jiù Jiāng Xíng Jǐng
- Jyutping: Gau3 Geong1 Jing4 Ging2
- Directed by: James Yuen
- Screenplay by: James Yuen
- Produced by: Joe Ma
- Starring: Francis Ng; Ti Lung; Nick Cheung; Stephanie Che
- Cinematography: Edmond Fung
- Edited by: Jacky Leung
- Music by: Lincoln Lo
- Production companies: Mei Ah Film Production; Brilliant Idea Group
- Distributed by: Mei Ah Entertainment
- Release date: 3 November 2000
- Running time: 104 minutes
- Country: Hong Kong
- Language: Cantonese
- Box office: HK$3,796,682

Clean My Name, Mr. Coroner! is a 2000 Hong Kong crime comedy thriller film written and directed by James Yuen and starring Francis Ng, Ti Lung and Nick Cheung.

== Plot ==
Undercover cop Fred Cheung (Nick Cheung) successfully assisted the police in arresting counterfeiters during an illegal transaction. However, afterwards, the illicit money, along with police officer Herman Law (Calvin Poon), went missing. While searching for Law and the money, Cheung was intercepted by the police, where they discover a headless corpse in the truck of his car. The corpse was later certified by the police as Law. Cheung flees in order to prove his innocence, and hijacks coroner Dr. Keith Ko (Francis Ng). Ko feels something strange about this case, and decides to help Cheung discover the truth to this case.

== Cast ==
- Francis Ng as Dr, Keith Ko (高兆祺)
- Ti Lung as Officer C.K. Lau (劉Sir)
- Nick Cheung as Fred Cheung (張耀輝)
- Stephanie Che as Ling
- Jerry Lamb as Lo
- Joe Ma as Detective Rick
- Wayne Lai as Cab driver
- Calvin Poon as Herman Law (阿雄)
- Kristal Tin as Bobo Lam (林寶儀)
- Iris Wong as Dr. Ko's date
- Joe Lee as money counterfeiter
- Kong Foo-keung as thug

== Reception ==
=== Critical ===
Far East Films gave the film a score of four out of five stars and greatly praised Francis Ng's performance. LoveHKFilm gave the film a mixed review, also praising Ng's performance in addition to Ti Lung's performance and calling the film "sporadically entertaining", but criticized its poor direction and recycled script. So Good Reviews gave the film a relatively positive review, praising director James Yuen's direction despite its unoriginal plot, and the performances by Cheung and Ti, and describing Ng as the film's "biggest shining star".

=== Box office ===
The film grossed HK$3,796,682 at the Hong Kong box office during its theatrical run from 3 to 22 November 2000.
