= As Sure as Fate =

Hong Kong TV show

- Official poster
- Also known as: Tough Housewives
- 師奶強人
- Genre: Modern Drama, Romance, Comedy
- Created by: Hong Kong Television Broadcasts Limited
- Starring: Hacken Lee; Joyce Tang; Joey Leung; Cutie Mui; Louis Yuen; Florence Kwok
- Theme music composer: Kwong Heung-san, Hacken Lee, Jacky Chan Tak-wei
- Opening theme: Single (一支花) by Hacken Lee
- Country of origin: Hong Kong
- Original language: Cantonese
- No. of episodes: 20

Production
- Producer: Mui Siu-ching
- Production location: Hong Kong
- Editor: Chiu Ting-yung
- Camera setup: Multi camera
- Running time: 45 minutes
- Production company: TVB

Original release
- Network: TVB Jade
- Release: 4 May – 29 May 1998

As Sure as Fate
- Chinese: 師奶強人
- Simplified Chinese: 师奶强人
- Literal meaning: "Tough Housewives"
Transcriptions
Standard Mandarin
- Hanyu Pinyin: shī nǎi qiáng rén
Yue: Cantonese
- Jyutping: si1 naai1 koeng4 jan4

As Sure as Fate (Chinese: 師奶強人; Jyutping: si1 naai1 koeng4 jan4; literally "Tough Housewives") is a 1998 Hong Kong romantic comedy television drama created and produced by TVB, starring Hacken Lee, Joyce Tang, Joey Leung, Cutie Mui, Louis Yuen, Florence Kwok as the main cast and was produced by popular TVB producer Mui Siu-ching. First original broadcast began on Hong Kong's Jade channel May 7 till May 29, 1998, every Monday through Friday during its 7:35 to 8:35pm timeslot with a total of 20 episodes.

== Synopsis ==
Two strangers who couldn't stand each other teams up together to break up their exes that dumped them abruptly to be together. However when they succeed at their plan, they end up falling for each other but are too proud to tell each how they really feel.

== Plot summary ==
Moyung Fei (Joyce Tang) is a recent design school graduate searching for work. She and her family meet garage owner and car mechanic Lee Siu-sum (Hacken Lee) in a car accident while on their way to the airport to pick up her older brother and his wife. Both sides have an unpleasant encounter, blaming each other for the car accident. Later Siu-sum and his grandmother become the Moyung family's new neighbor when he purchases the apartment right across from theirs. Both sides end up as unfriendly neighbors due to further unpleasant encounters and neighborly bickering. On Siu-sum's wedding day he finds out that his girlfriend Wing-Kei has left him for Wing-kin, who turns out to be Yung-fei's boyfriend. Fei doesn't realize she has been dumped and swindled out of her and her family's money until Wing-kin has disappeared and changed all his contacts. Feeling wronged and scorned by their exes, Siu-sum and Fei team up to find Wing-Kei and Wing-kin to break them up. However, after they succeed at their plan, he realizes that he might have fallen for Fei but still proceeds to reconcile with Wing-kei. Soon Wing-kei notices that Siu-sum's attention has shifted to Fei and seeing how nice and caring Yung-fei has been to her, she leaves Siu-sum a second time during their wedding day so he can realize his true feelings for Yung-fei.

Yung-fei's older sister Moyung Chu (Cutie Mui) is always looking for love and misinterprets every man as being interested in her when they are nice to her. Every time she encounters a guy she thinks is interested in her, he ends up asking for a discount for him and his fiancee at her family's bridal outfit shop. She works as a receptionist at an accounting firm and luck seems to be with her when the handsome new accountant asks her out on a date. After dating her new tall and handsome co-worker, who is as interested in her as she is in him, she thinks she has found the perfect man until he tells her he has no interest in marriage due to already being married once. Her absentminded behavior during her time of heartbreak leads everyone at work to believe she made a costly mistake when it was in fact her sister-in-law Gan Jing-mei's mistake. After being fired from her job, she takes on odd jobs until she finds work as a photographer assistant, working for Siu-sum's friend Hui Man-keung (Joey Leung), who is a laid-back guy, but becomes a demanded boss during work.

Fei's older brother Moyung Tak (Louis Yuen) and his wife Kan Ching-mei (Florence Kwok) has just returned from Canada after a failed business venture. Yung-tak is a pushover for his domineering and vain wife who refuses to get pregnant because she is afraid of getting fat and is only interested in the finer things in life. Whenever Ching-mei and her mother-in-law get into an argument she forces Tak to choose sides, when he tries to stay neutral or sides with his mother, Ching-mei threaten's to divorcee him. However things change one day when Tak meets a model working for Man-keung and starts having an affair with her. Ching-mei runs into them at a clothing boutiques and threatens to divorce him which Tak is glad to hear since he had put up with his wife long enough. Surprisingly Tak's family sides with Ching-mei and kicks him out of the family home since they believe what he did was wrong.

Besides Siu-sum and Fei, their parents also have a unpleasant relationship due to both of their mothers not getting along. Szeto Wai-kuen and Au-yeung Fung are not only rivals in business but also former rivals in love. Both were former best friends who feel that the other had stolen their boyfriend. Wai-kuen's husband Fat was Fung's former boyfriend, but because Wai-kuen met Yung-fat first she feels Fung stole her boyfriend when Fung and Fat were dating, while Fung feels Wai-kuen stole Yung-fat when they broke up, ending up with Fat marrying Wai-kuen. The two are also rivals in business since Fung owns and manages a modern bridal salon while the Moyung family owns a traditional Chinese kwa bridal business. Things get complicated further when Wai-kuen's brother Szeto Ming arrives and seems to be interested in Fung.

== Cast ==
=== Main cast ===
- Hacken Lee as Sam Lee Siu-sum 李小森 (similar pronunciation to "you be careful" in Cantonese)

Owner and mechanic of a car garage. He lives with his grandmother and has an awkward relationship with his mother since she was really never there for him when he was growing up. His fiancee Tong Wing-kei breaks up with him with a written letter to him on their wedding day because she feels they do not match other since she is more refine and he is a bit rough. When Moyung Fei offers to help him get Wing-kei back he teams up with her to break up his exes new relationship but in the process ends up falling for Fei.

- Joyce Tang as Moyung Fei 慕容菲

The youngest child in the Moyung family. A recent clothing design graduate who is searching for a job. Her boyfriend Cheng Wing-kin swindles her entire family and disappears. Feeling guilty for what happened to her family she desperately searches for him. When she finds him and his new girlfriend she devises a plan together with Siu-sum to break them up. She pretends to be friends with Wing-kei to gain her trust but later the two become real friends. She later becomes a designer at Siu-sum's mother bridal salon.

- Joey Leung as Hui Man-keung 許文強 (same name as the main protagonist The Bund)

Siu-sum's best-friend and later housemate. A photographer who lives and rents a room from a family with lots of children, Siu-sum's offers to have him move into his place when he sees the condition he is living in. A laid back and relaxed guy he becomes a demanded and stern person during work which Moyung Chu experiences first hand when she works for him.

- Cutie Mui as Moyung Chu 慕容珠 (similar pronunciation to "useless pig" in Cantonese)

Moyung Fei's older sister and the Mo family second child. She is always searching for love and misinterprets guys when they treat her nice. Just when she thought she had found the perfect guy in her new co-worker he tells her he has no plans to marry. Too absent minded it leads to her getting fired at work when it was really her sister-in-law Kan Ching-mei's mistake, she later ends up working for Hui Man-keung as his assistant.

=== Moyung family ===
- Kwok Fung as Moyung Fat 慕容發 (similar pronunciation to "never wealthy" in Cantonese)

Fei, Chu, Tak father and Wai-kuen's husband. His family owns and manages a traditional Chinese bridal outfit shop, which he inherited from his father. He is also the former boyfriend of Au-yeung Fung, whom he still carries a torch for, and becomes jealous when his brother-in-law Ming starts a close friendship with Fung.

- Rainbow Ching as Szeto Wai-kuen 司徒惠娟

Fei, Chu, Tak mother and Fat's wife. She is also Szeto Ming's younger sister. She is the former best friend of Au-yeung Fung who she is now enemies with because she feels her friend tried to steal her boyfriend (who is now her husband) when they were younger. She is a person who thinks that in order for things to be done right you have to do it yourself.

- Louis Yuen as Moyung Tak 慕容德 (similar pronunciation to "never succeeds" in Cantonese)

Oldest child and only son of the mo family. He and his wife Gan Jing-mei returns to Hong Kong from Canada after their business fails. A pushover, he always sides with his unreasonable wife until a girl he spends a drunken night with shows up at his doorstep and tells him she is pregnant with his child.

- Florence Kwok as Kwon Ching-mei 簡靜美 (similar pronunciation to "picked last" in Cantonese)

Moyung Tak's vain and demanding wife. She does not respect her husband or his family. Refusing to get pregnant and unreasonable, her husband nevertheless sides with her, until a girl he had a drunken night out with breaks their marriage. When her husband leaves her, she finds herself pregnant and alone, and she starts to realize her faults with her mother and sisters in-law still caring for her.

- Lo Mang as Szeto Ming 司徒明

Szeto Wai-kuen older brother and Fei, Chu, Tak uncle. He moves in with his older sister and later strikes up a friendship with their neighbor's mother Au-yeung Fung.

=== Lee family ===
- Lai Suen as Lee Sau-kam 李秀琴

Lee Siu-sum's grandmother who he still lives with and Au-yeung Fung's mother-in-law. She raised her grandson when her widowed daughter-in-law had to work in order to build her bridal business.

- Rebecca Chan as Au-yeung Fung 歐陽鳳

Lee Siu-sum's widowed mother and Lee Sau-kam's daughter-in-law. She owns and manages a bridal salon where Yung-fei later work at. She and Wai-kuen used to be former friends but turned enemies when she feels Wai-kuen broke her and Yung-fat up, who Wai-kuen later married. She later strikes up a friendship with Wai-kuen's young brother Szeto Ming'.

=== Extended cast ===
- Michael Tse as Cheng Wing-kin 鄭永健

Mo Yung-fei's ex-boyfriend who swindled her family out of a huge amount of money. Never formally breaking up with Yung-fei, he disappears with his new girlfriend Tong Wing-kei without a word. A swindler who likes to cheat women out of money, he is only with Tong Wing-kei because of her American citizenship.

- Eileen Yeow as Tong Wing-kei 唐詠琪

Lee Siu-sum's ex-fiancee who breaks up with him on their wedding day because she feels they do not match each other. She becomes Cheng Wing-kin's new fiancee not knowing he is only with her because of her American citizenship. When she reconciles with Siu-sum she realizes that he may not love her like he used too.

- Marco Lo as Fok Chun-nam 霍振南

Mo Yung-chu's new co-worker at the accounting firm. He is interested in her but has no plans to marry her.

- Wong Sun as uncle Gim 劍叔

The elderly man who works at the Mo family traditional Chinese bridal outfit shop. He acts more like the boss than Yung-fat because he used to work for Yung-fat's father.

- Wong Wai-leung as Bak Fung-yun 白鳳丸

Lee Siu-sum's friend who works at his mechanic garage.

- Isaac Ng as Si Yau-dip 豉油碟 (similar pronunciation to "soy sauce plate" in Cantonese)

Lee Siu-sum's friend who works at his mechanic garage.

- Kwok Churk-yip as Buckteeth So 牙擦蘇

Lee Siu-sum's friend who works at his mechanic garage.

- June Chan as Kat

Mo Yung-chu's co-worker at the accounting firm who later becomes Gan Jing-mei's assistant when Jing-mei gets a job as a supervisor there.

- Wang Wai-tak as Cafe owner 茶餐廳老闆

The tea and coffee shop Mo Yung-chu frequents. Yung-chu misinterprets him liking her when he is nice to her but he only wanted to get a discount at her family's Chinese bridal shop.

- Amy Chung as Bonnie

A model who works with Hui Man-keung. Mo Yung-tak later has an affair with her.

- Angela Tong as Dan 丹姐

A model who uses her relationship with the boss to give Hui Man-keung a difficult time.
