= Janis Chan =

Hong Kong television presenter and actress

- 陳貝兒
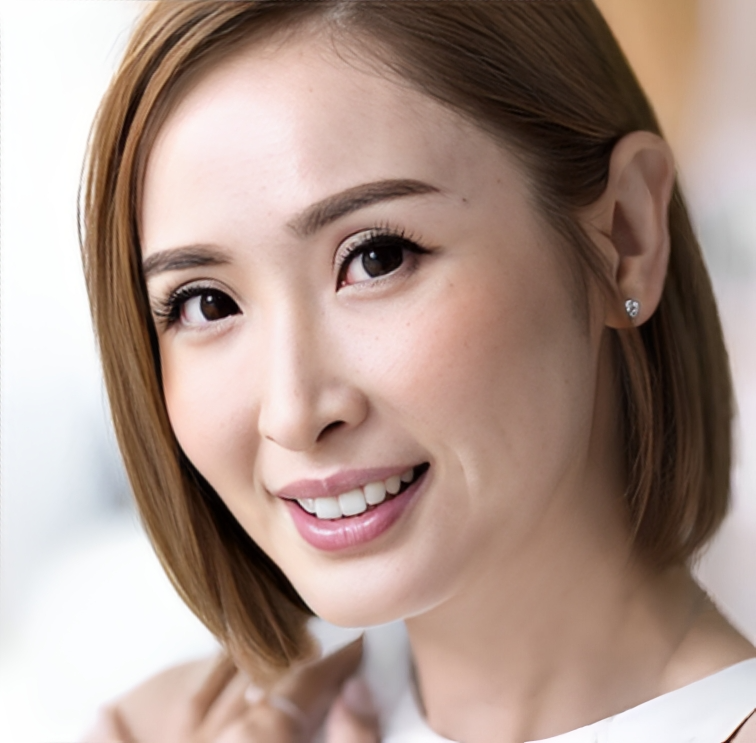
- Chan in 2024
- Born: Chan Pui Yee; June 14, 1979 (age 47); Hong Kong
- Education: Simon Fraser University, Marymount Secondary School
- Occupations: Host, news anchor
- Years active: 2003–present
- Employer: Wharf Cable Television（2003－2009） TVB（2009、2013–present）
- Notable work: Scoop ,Faraway Brides,No Poverty Land
- Spouse: Wong Kwok Tung (m. 2011; div. 2017)
- Father: Chen Yonhhao
- Awards: TVB Anniversary Award for Best Hos Miss Hong Kong2024 Touching China Annual Person of the Year Award

Janis Chan (Chinese: 陳貝兒; born 14 June 1979) is a Hong Kong television presenter, actor, and business executive. She is currently the Executive Director of the social enterprise Green Monday and a contract artist under TVB. Chan is best known for hosting the No Poverty Land (《無窮之路》) documentary series, for which she won the Best Host award at the TVB Anniversary Awards in 2021, 2022, and 2024. Chan is dedicated to promoting vegetarianism and environmentally friendly living. In April 2013, she formed a Hong Kong team to participate in the Arctic Marathon to encourage vegetarianism and environmental protection. The trip was widely reported by Apple Daily's "Dynamic News", and the "Arctic Run" program was produced for TVB.

== Life ==
=== Early life and education ===
Janis Chan was born in British Hong Kong on 14 June 1979. She has one elder sister and one younger brother. Her father, Chan Yongho, worked as a concert production director. At the age of 12, while studying in Primary Five at Marymount Primary School, Chan and her family emigrated to Vancouver, Canada, amid the wave of emigration from Hong Kong in the early 1990s. She later attended Simon Fraser University, where she majored in journalism and communication and minored in education.

=== Career ===
In 2003, Chan was discovered by TVB executive Yu Wing-shan and joined Hong Kong Cable Television's newly launched Entertainment News Channel. She returned to Hong Kong to work as a news anchor and reporter, becoming one of the city's first generation of entertainment news presenters. Her early assignments included covering Michael Joseph Jackson events, the Academy Awards, Cannes Film Festival, Venice Film Festival, and fashion weeks in Milan and New York City. She interviewed celebrities such as Takuya Kimura, Lee Byung-hun, and Ang Lee, earning her the nickname "Queen of Cable Entertainment News." In 2009, she joined BMA Entertainment as an artist and a sports marketing executive, managing Hong Kong First Division League football clubs. South China and TSW Pegasus, as well as managing the company's publishing business, promoting both sports and culture. During this time, Due to BMA affiliation with the Hong Kong Recording Industry Alliance (HKRIA) amid an ongoing copyright dispute, she stopped hosting on TVB. Subsequently, she became a guest host on the NOW 101 Channel program 'Action to Money' until she was appointed as the channel head of NOW Star Channel upon its launch. In 2013, she returned to TVB, focusing on hosting and emceeing duties. Outside of her media career, Chan is also a devout Buddhist and a disciple of Venerable Hsing Yun of Fo Guang Shan. She has been actively involved in social and charitable causes. In September 2012, she was appointed Executive Director of the Nonprofit organization social enterprise Green Monday, promoting sustainable living and vegetarianism. She published two books: Entertainments and Insights (2007) and A Life of Freedom (2009), and wrote columns for Cosmopolitan (Hong Kong edition), Headline Daily, East Week, and Ming Pao. In 2017, she hosted the TVB program 'Faraway Brides', traveling to countries such as Germany, Denmark, Thailand, and Abu Dhabi. That year, she finalized her divorce. In 2019, she earned the 4th Disciples Escoffier Professional Diploma in pastry arts and received the Level 5 French Culinary Training Certificate from the French Ministry of Education (France).

In 2022, Chan won the "Best Female Host" award at the TVB Anniversary Awards 2021 and was selected as one of the "2021 Touching China " for her TVB program " Infinite Road ". The program was also selected by the expert review team of the General National Radio and Television Administration as one of the 20 "Outstanding Overseas Communication Works" of 2021. In 2024, Chen Bei'er won the "Best Female Host" award at the TVB Anniversary Awards 2024 for the third time.

On March 30, 2022, Bonnie Chan was interviewed via video by the Greater Bay Area Channel of China News Service on the program Bay Area Youth Talk.

== Filmography ==
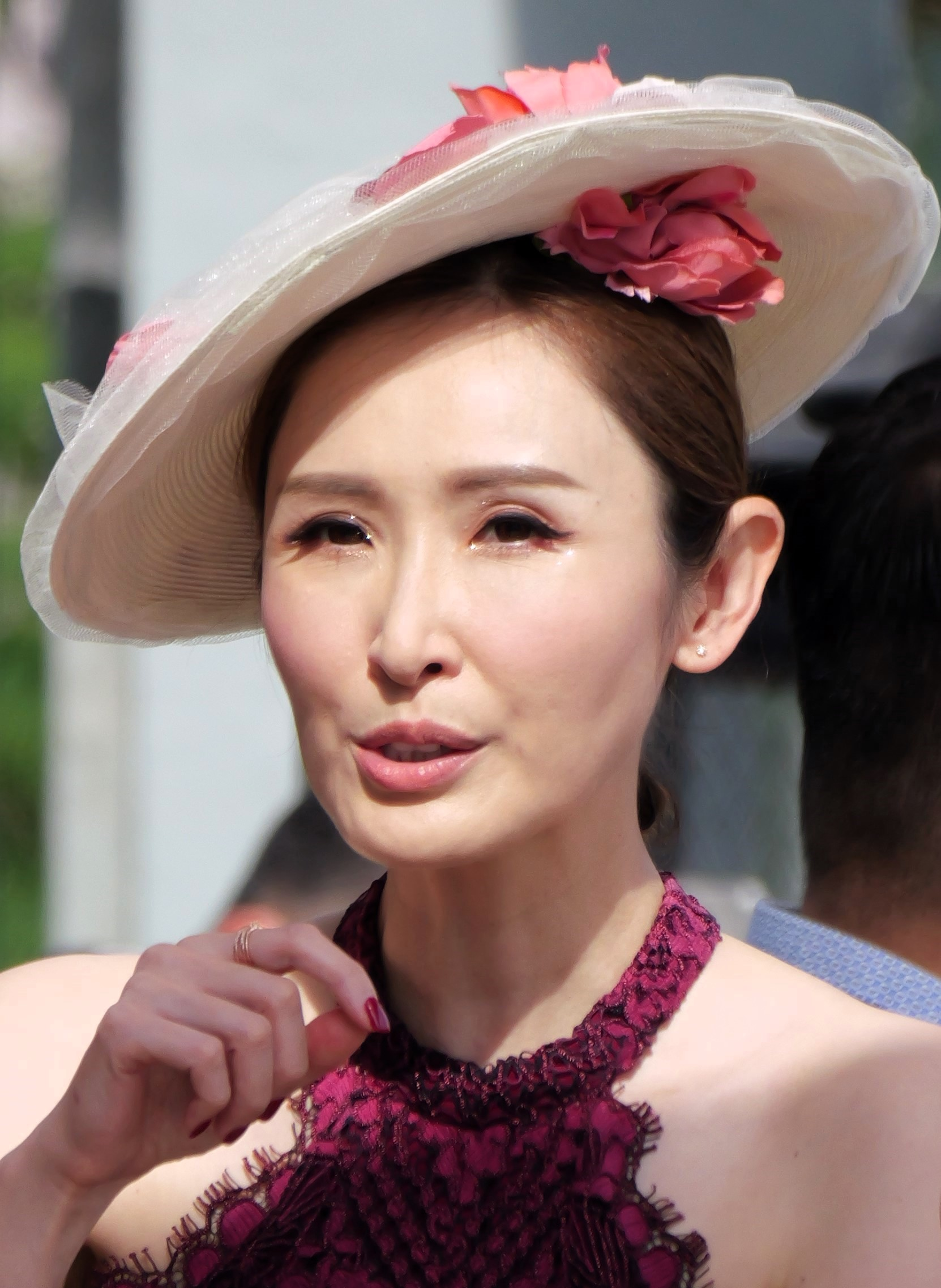
On 18 February 2024, Janis Chan attended the "TVB Cup" event at Sha Tin Racecourse

Television Dramas

- 2018: Another Era – as Tsang Yi-ning
- 2020: Hong Kong Love Stories – as Lee Ting-kwan

Films

- 2022: Sunshine of my Life – as Miss Chan

=== Television Hosting ===
==== TVB ====
2009–2012
- Mr. Hong Kong 2009
- Yan Oi Tong Charity Show
- The People's Republic of China National Day Celebration (61st Anniversary)

2013–2015

- Tung Wah Charity Show
- Pok Oi Hospital Charity Show
- Community Chest Gala
- Miss Chinese International Pageant 2015
- Academy Award

2016–2018

- 2016 Summer Olympics
- National Day Celebration Gala (67th Anniversary)
- TVB Anniversary Gala
- Tung Wah Charity Show
- 6th Hong Kong Games Opening Ceremony

2019–2021

- 13th Asian Film Awards (J2)
- Tung Wah Charity Show
- Dolce Vita (TV programme)
- 2020 Summer Olympics

2022–2025

- The Endless Journey (Seasons 2–4)
- National Day Celebration (74th Anniversary)

=== Radio Programs (as Guest) ===
- Commercial Radio 903
- 25 October 2008: RTHK Radio 2 – Leave it for Later

=== Magazine Appearance ===
- 2009: Choice Monthly, Issue No. 397

=== Song ===
- 2022: Together Under the Lion Rock Against the Pandemic, performed with various artists

=== Books ===
- "Entertainment is my news – Chen Bei'er" (January 7, 2007, Jia Publishing Co., Ltd., ISBN 9789628955275 )
- "Free Life" (December 2009, Bomei Publishing House, ISBN 9789881874832 )

== Awards and nominations ==
years	Awarding Unit	Awards	work	result
2017–2019	TVB Anniversary Awards 2017	Best TV Host	Faraway Brides1–3	Nominated
2021	Touching China Award 2021	Touching China Awards 2021	No Poverty Land	Won
2021	TVB Anniversary Awards 2021	Best Female Host	No Poverty Land	Won
2022	TVB Anniversary Awards 2022	Best Female Host	No Poverty Land II – A Treasure Trove	Won
2023	TVB Anniversary Awards 2023	Best Female Host	Yan Chai Charity Show, Community Chest Charity Show, "Infinite Road III – Boundless Territory"Show, TVB Anniversary Gala Show	Nominated
2024	TVB Anniversary Awards2024	Best Female Host	Miss Hong Kong Pageant 2024, Olympic Athletes Gala , No Poverty Land IV, Hong Kong compatriots celebrate the 75th anniversary of the founding of the People's Republic of China , TVB Anniversary Gala Show	Won
