= Bondy Chiu =

Hong Kong actress and singer

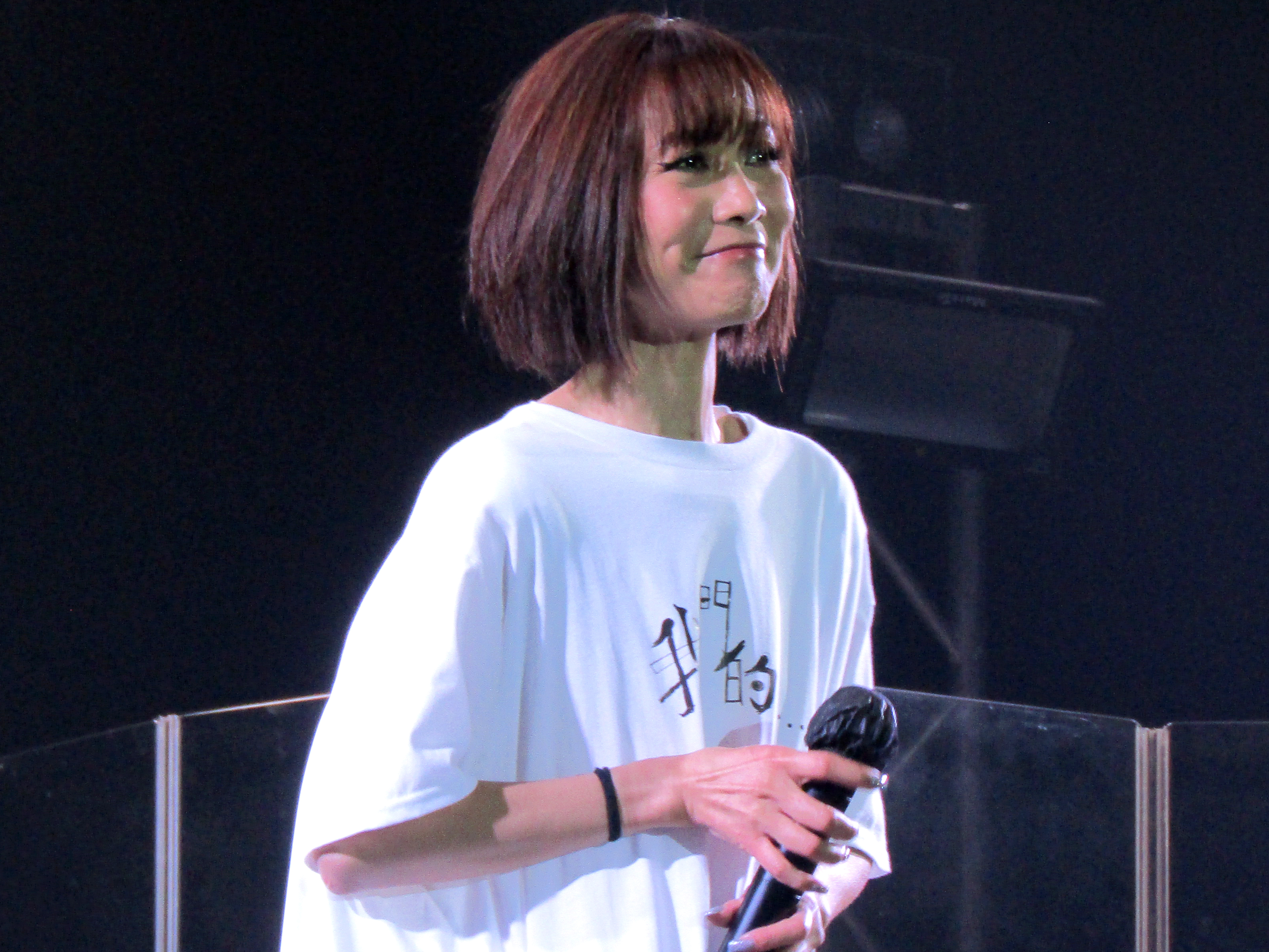
- Bondy Chiu in 2021
- Born: Chiu Wai-yin (趙慧燕); 31 March 1971 (age 55); Hong Kong
- Spouse: Alan So (m. 2011)

Chinese name
- Traditional Chinese: 趙學而
- Simplified Chinese: 赵学而
Transcriptions
Standard Mandarin
- Hanyu Pinyin: Zhào Xuéér
- Musical career
- Also known as: A Lo

Bondy Chiu Hok-yee (Chinese: 趙學而; born 31 March 1971 in Hong Kong) is an actress and singer in Hong Kong. She is best known for her role as Lam Yuk-lo in the long-running TVB series Virtues of Harmony.

On 10 December 2008, her new album titled Ting (Chinese word means listen) was released after a long break from the music industry.

== Albums ==
- Rebel For Love Song (1994)
- Every Two Seconds (1995)
- Love More Being More Afraid.... (1996)
- Finding a Person (1997)
- I Said I Will Make You Happy (1998)
- Inside (1999)
- Slower Is Better (2000)
- Be Right Back – Best Selection (CD+DVD) (2005)
- Slower Is Better (Reissue Version) (2007)
- Listen (2008)
- Listen & Listen (2009)
- Trinity (2011)
- Chanteur (2012)

== Filmography ==
=== Television series ===
Year	English title	Chinese title	Role	Notes
1990	When the Sun Shines	同居三人組	Annie	
1995	The Criminal Investigator	O記實錄	Bonnie Wong	
1996	The Criminal Investigator II	O記實錄II	Bonnie Wong	
1997	Demi-Gods and Semi-Devils	天龍八部	Muk Yuen-ching	
1998	Dragon Hall	龍堂	Kit	
2001	On the Track or Off	勇往直前	Luk Wing-tung	
2001–02	Virtues of Harmony	皆大歡喜	Lam Yuk-lo	
2003–05	Virtues of Harmony II	皆大歡喜	Lam Yuk-lo	
2010	Mei Tsai is Greater Than His Master	妹仔大過主人婆	Ah Hei	
2012	Mei Tsai is Greater Than His Master 2	妹仔大過主人婆2	Ah Hei	
2015	Second Life	第二人生	Joyce Chu	
2016	Margaret and David: Green Beans	瑪嘉烈與大衛系列_綠豆		Guest star
2016	3 X 1	三一如三		Guest star

=== Film ===
Year	English title	Chinese title	Role	Notes
1997	97' Lan Kwai Fong	蘭桂坊七公主		
1998	You Light Up My Life	想見妳		
1998	Rumble Ages	烈火青春		
