= Stephanie Che =

Hong Kong actress and singer

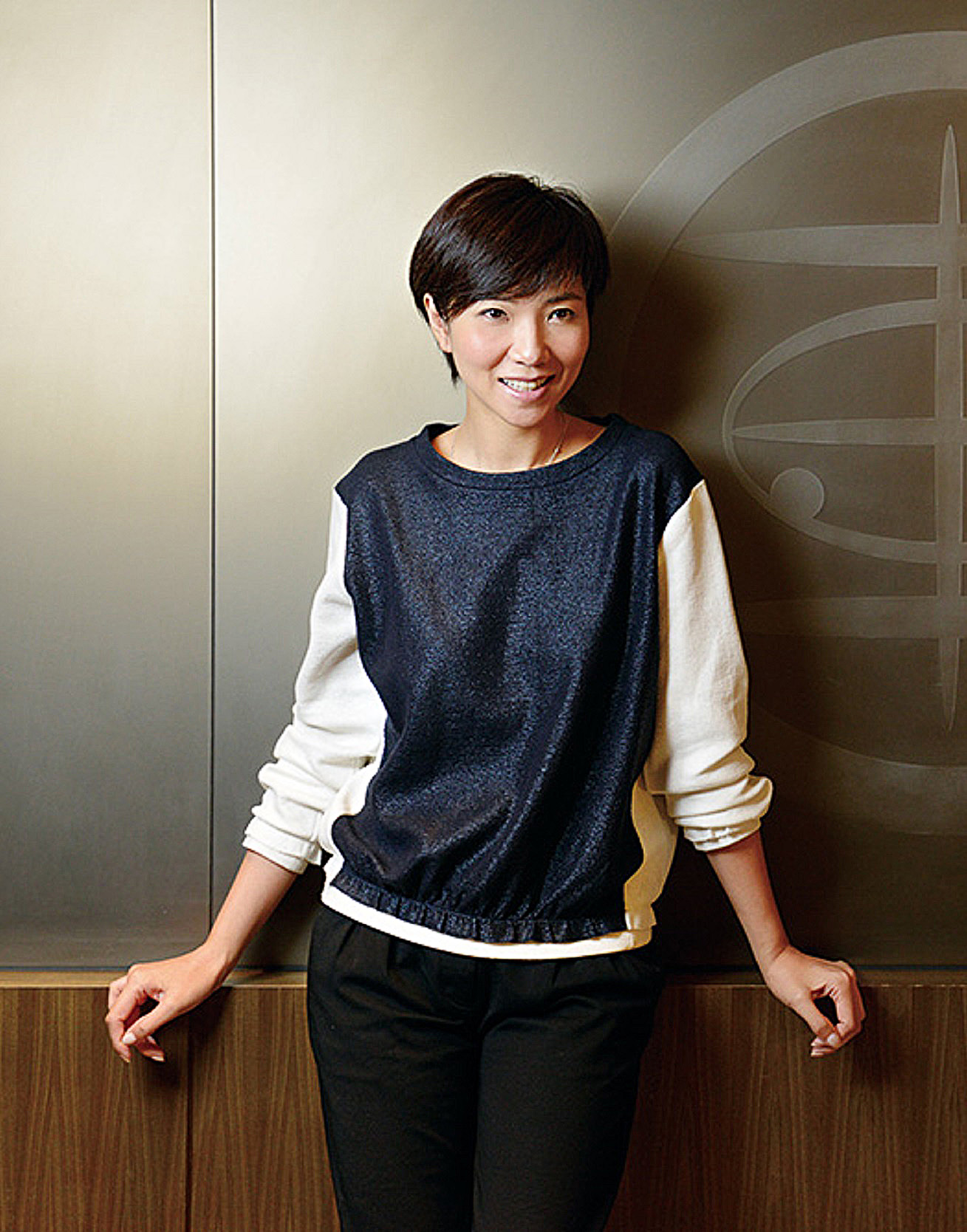
- Che in 2015
- Born: 28 December 1973 (age 52); Los Angeles, California, US
- Occupations: Actress; singer
- Parent: Cheung Ying-shoi

Chinese name
- Traditional Chinese: 車婉婉
Transcriptions
Standard Mandarin
- Hanyu Pinyin: Chē Wǎnwǎn

Stephanie Che Yuen Yuen (Chinese: 車婉婉, born 28 December 1973) is a Hong Kong actress and singer. Che started her career as the winner of New Talent Singing Awards in 1992.

== Early life ==
Che was born in Los Angeles, U.S., grew up in single-parent family.

== Filmography ==
=== Film ===
| Year | Title | Role | Notes |
|---|---|---|---|
| 1998 | Beast Cops | | |
| 1999 | The Legend of Speed | Tang Fung's girlfriend | |
| 2000 | Clean My Name, Mr. Coroner! | Ling | |
| 2002 | A Man Like Me; Maður eins og ég | Chinese woman (Qi) | |
| 2004 | Butterfly | Jin | |
| 2009 | Lady Cop & Papa Crook | Vivian | |
| 2011 | Life Without Principle | Jackie | |
| 2012 | I Love Hong Kong 2012 | | |
| 2013 | A Complicated Story | Kammy Au | |
| 2013 | Blind Detective | | |
| 2013 | The Midas Touch | | |
| 2013 | Bends | | |
| 2015 | Full Strike | Madam | |
| 2015 | Office | Ban Ban | |
| 2015 | Get Outta Here | | |
| 2016 | My Wife Is a Superstar | | |
| 2016 | Happiness | | |
| 2016 | Sisterhood | #38 | |

=== Television series ===
| Year | Title | Role |
|---|---|---|
| 2001 | Virtues of Harmony 皆大歡喜 | Concubine Man Kwai Fei 萬貴妃 |
| 2003 | Virtues of Harmony II 皆大歡喜 | Man Gwai Fei 萬桂菲 |
| 2006 | Under the Canopy of Love 天幕下的戀人 | Ho Lien Sung 何連生 |
| 2008 | The Seventh Day 最美麗的第七天 | Kwok Shui Lan 郭端嫻 |
| 2017 | Provocateur 與諜同謀 | Laura |
| 2020 | The Dripping Sauce 大醬園 | |
| 2021 | Plan B 寶寶大過天 | Ko Cheuk Wun 高卓媛 |
| 2021 | The Kwoks and What 我家無難事 | Double Kwok Tak Bo 郭得寶 |
| 2022 | Story of Zom-B 食腦喪B | Sarah Man Chau |
| 2023 | The Queen of News 新聞女王 | Chiu Min Wah 趙敏華 |
| 2024 | See Her Again 太阳星辰 | Chong Hiu Wah 莊曉華 |

== Discography ==
- Love is Beautiful theme-song – "The Price for Love" (真面目)
