= Wallis Pang =

- Born: 彭愛; 26 August 1973 (age 53)

Chinese name
- Traditional Chinese: 彭子晴
Transcriptions
Standard Mandarin
- Hanyu Pinyin: Pang Chi Ching
- Musical career
- Origin: Hong Kong

Wallis Pang (born 26 August 1973) was once an actress with Television Broadcasts Limited, who first came into fame in File of Justice. She is popularly known for her role Ah Jing in A Kindred Spirit, in which she was paired with Lap San, played by Marco Lo and was named as one of the "Five Fresh Beauties of TVB". She is no longer active in acting.

== Filmography ==
- File of Justice IV (1995)
- Cold Blood Warm Heart (1995)
- The Legend of Master Chan (1996)
- The Hitman Chronicles (1996)
- The Criminal Investigator II (1996)
- A Road and A Will (1997)
- A Kindred Spirit (1997–1999)
- Moments of Endearment (1998)
- A Matter of Business (1999)
- Detective Investigation Files IV (1999)
- Ultra Protection (1999)
- Project Ji Xiang (2002)

=== Films ===
- Don't Fool Me (1991)
- Fight Back to School (1991)
- Fist of Legend (1994)
- Troublesome Night 3 (1998)
