= Moments of Endearment =

Chinese comedy drama

- Promo poster
- 外父唔怕做
- Genre: Comedy; Drama
- Developed by: TVB
- Written by: Ng Lap Gong 伍立光; Bao Wei Cung 鮑偉聰; Lau Jun Yin 劉俊賢; Au Kit Yee 歐健兒; Ng Sum 伍少寶; Chan Ho Bun 陳浩斌; Leung Man Wah 梁敏華
- Directed by: Lam Suk Fan 林淑芬; Law Kit Qi 羅健祺; Chow Sui Wah 周小樺; Leung Gwok Bun 梁國斌
- Starring: Nick Cheung 張家輝; Miriam Yeung 楊千嬅; Paul Chun 秦沛; Louisa So 蘇玉華; Michael Tse 謝天華; Kingdom Yuen 苑瓊丹
- Opening theme: Let Me Fly (讓我飛) by Miriam Yeung 楊千嬅
- Country of origin: Hong Kong
- Original language: Cantonese
- No. of seasons: 1
- No. of episodes: 20

Production
- Producer: Mui Siu Ching 梅小青
- Production location: Hong Kong
- Camera setup: Multi camera
- Running time: 45 minutes (each)
- Production company: TVB

Original release
- Network: TVB Jade
- Release: 21 December 1998 – 15 January 1999

Moments of Endearment (Chinese: 外父唔怕做; pinyin: Ngoi Fu Ng Pa Jo) is a 1998 till 1999 Hong Kong modern comedy drama produced by TVB, starring Nick Cheung, Miriam Yeung, Paul Chun, Louisa So, Michael Tse in main roles and Kingdom Yuen, Evergreen Mak, Sherming Yiu, Mary Hon, Kwok Fung, Chan Man Na, Joseph Lee Kwok Lun, Felix Lok in supporting roles. The Chinese title of the drama literally translate to "Not Afraid to be The Father-in-law". The series is produced by well known and long time TVB producer Mui Siu Ching. It began airing weekly on TVB's Jade channel from December 21, 1998 till January 15, 1999, in its 7:30 to 8:30 PM time slot with 20 episodes total.

Moments of Endearment is both Nick Cheung and Miriam Yeung's first roles as the main leads. Previously Nick Cheung starred as 3rd or 4th co-star in a series. Mirium Yeung was a newcomer at that time with only minor roles in previous TVB dramas. The series also brought recognition to Michael Tse as an actor, he previously became popular in the Hong Kong "Young and Dangerous" film franchise and was known for his role as triad member "Ah Yee". His role in Moments of Endearment as the cowardly and feminine guy "Ah Fai" showed that he can be a versatile actor who can take on other kinds of characters.

== Synopsis ==
An overly protective widower father who learns to let go of his only child/daughter when she gets married. A grown daughter who has just returned home after studying abroad, falls for her dad's young co-worker and gets married right away. The father feeling lonely and bored with his only child out of the house falls in love with his younger female boss who also has an overly protective father that is worse than himself.

== Plot summary ==
Chung Ji Wai (Paul Chun) is a widower who is excited that his only child Chung Lok Yee (Miriam Yeung) is finally returning home after studying abroad for so many years. To mark the special occasion, he goes to his bank vault to get his prized abalones he has been saving for a celebratory meal. On a bus ride to work that same morning, he meets Chan Yau Chung (Nick Cheung), a well mannered young man. Wai sir as he is called by all his co-workers, is the most senior sales rep at the insurance company he works for. He also manages the most under performing sales team in the company. His team has not been able to make their sales quota for months and is usually looked down upon by the other sales team. His boss Elaine (Louisa So) decides to add the new person in the company, which happens to be Chung to his sales team. Wai sir is happy with the addition of Chung on his team since Chung is bright and ambitious.

At the airport, Wai sir and Chung run into each other. Wai sir is there to pick up his daughter Yee, while Chung is there to pick up his best friend Fai (Michael Tse) whose mannerisms are very feminine. Seeing Chung and Fai together, Wai sir immediately misinterprets the two to be in a same sex relationship when in fact, Fai has a girlfriend named Virginia that takes him for granted. When Yee arrives, Wai sir is extremely happy to see his daughter again but to his disappointment he meets Sue who is the friend Yee had written to him about. Wai sir had originally thought Sue was a girl because of the name but Sue turns out to be a guy, Yee's boyfriend to be exact. Wai sir immediately dislikes Sue but hides it from his daughter in order to make her happy. Wai sir not trusting Sue, has his nephew Ying Wai follow Sue around, they soon find out that Sue has another girlfriend on the side. He tells his daughter but Yee does not believe him, disappointed in her father she goes to Sue's house to find someone to console but instead catches him in an intimate situation with his other girlfriend.

Wanting to cheer his daughter up from her heartbreak, Wai sir buys two tickets to a dance ball, a few days before the date of the ball he injures his foot. Not wanting the tickets to go to waste he ask Chung who he thinks is gay to take Yee to the ball in his place instead. Chung falls in love with Yee on the night of the ball after spending time chatting together and seeing how pretty she looked that night. When Wai sir's team finally makes their sales quota he decides to invite his entire team to his home for a BBQ celebration. At the BBQ, Chung and Yee become more close and Yee soon falls for Chung too.

Chung and Yee start dating secretly, but Wai sir finds out about the two. He does not approve of the relationship because he is overly protective of his daughter. Wai sir's disapproval of Chung going out with Yee causes conflict at their workplace. Not deterred by Wai sir's thoughts on their relationship Chung and Yee continue dating without Wai sir's approval. When Wai Sir falls ill Chung helps Yee take care of him, seeing how Chung is a devoted and caring boyfriend Wai sir finally gives his approval to their relationship. But later on Chung and Yee were scared of losing each other and decided to get married quickly. With his married daughter moved out of the house, Wai sir felt lonely and dives into his work. Being hard at work he gets close to his boss Elaine, the two soon start dating but her father is even more overly protective than Wai sir. Soon he goes through what Chung went through when he dated Yee.

== Cast ==
=== Main cast ===
- Nick Cheung 張家輝 as Chan Yau Chung 陳有充

Wai sir's co-worker at an insurance firm. He originally hated Yee and thought of her as a bad luck jinx because on the day he ran into her at a cafe he found out his high school crush was a home-wrecking mistress to a married man and his car was damaged by Yee when she tried to drive him home while he was drunk. Wai sir thought he was gay because he had seen Chung together with his feminine friend Fai hugging on the street, so he asked Chung to take Yee to a dance ball in his place but on the day of the ball, Chung ends up falling in love with Yee.

- Miriam Yeung 楊千嬅 as Chung Lok Yee 鍾樂怡

Wai sir's only daughter and child. Her father is overly protective of her, helping her find a job and buying clothes for her. She came back to Hong Kong after studying abroad with her boyfriend Sue; she soon finds out he has another girlfriend on the side. Her dad with the help of Chung gets her a job at an advertisement agency. Her dad, thinking Chung is gay, pushes the two to become close without knowing it. She soon falls in love with Chung and gets married after only dating him for a few weeks after being scared of losing him.

- Paul Chun 秦沛 as Chung Ji Wai 鍾志威

Yee's overly protective widower father. His wife died long ago, leaving with him their only daughter. He works at an insurance company as a senior sales representative and manages Chung. His sales team always gets outshined by the company's other sales team because they are not competitive enough. After Yee marries Chung and moves out of the house, Wai sir becomes lonely and starts taking his job more seriously. He soon falls for his boss Elaine, but she too has an overly protective father who is even worse than Wai sir.

- Louisa So 蘇玉華 as Yeung Jan Nam (Elaine) 楊鎮男

Wai sir's 30 something female boss at the insurance company. Wai sir originally trained her when she entered the insurance company, with her hard work and dedication she eventually got promoted and became his boss. She is very strict on Wai sir and often gives him a scolding because his team always under performs and is unable to make their monthly quota. Later when Wai sir becomes hard working, she starts admiring him again and they start dating, but because she has an over-protective father, they have to date in secret.

- Michael Tse 謝天華 as Lee Jun Fai 李俊輝

Chung's best friend since high school. People often mistake him to be gay because of his feminine mannerism. He works at a branch bank as an account manager whom the older lady customers like because of his sincere kindness. His girlfriend since high school, Virginia, takes advantage of him and uses him as a sap until a better guy comes along. In the beginning he hated Yee's best friend, Leung Nga Si but after she sticks up for him and they get to know each other better the two soon start liking each other.

=== Supporting cast ===
- Kingdom Yuen 苑瓊丹 as Chung Ji Mei 鍾志美

Wai sir's younger 40 something sister and Yee's aunt. She has been divorced several times and lives at Wai sir's. Since she is the type to not mind her ex-husband who she is still on friendly terms with, he takes advantage of her kindness by having her babysit his son from his other wife. She works as a sales rep for a restaurant supply company. She is the only female and youngest person working at her company. When one of the owner's nephew Wong Ha To joins her workplace, Mei is reluctant of changes he implemented for the company. After working closely together to the two become close and later date.

- Gigi Fu 傅明憲 as Leung Nga Si 梁雅詩

Yee's best friend and co-worker at an advertisement company. Due to a misunderstanding, she originally hated Chung's best friend Fai, but after seeing him being dumped by his ungrateful girlfriend she starts to pity him and becomes his friend. With Yee being married and no time for her, she starts hanging out with Fai and soon falls for him.

- Sherming Yiu 姚樂怡 as Ho Yin Hou (Virginia) 何燕好

Fai's girlfriend since high school, a vain person who only wants the best that life can offer. She takes Fai for granted and is only with him until someone richer comes along. She enters into a beauty pageant and gets recognition which leads to her meeting rich playboys. She breaks up with Fai to be with her rich new older boyfriend. She becomes enemies with Nga Si when she overhears her making fun of her for being a gold digger. When Fai and Nga Si began dating she breaks the two up by pretending to have a terminal illness because she doesn't want them to be happy.

- Evergreen Mak 麥長青 as Tsang Ying Wai 曾英偉

Wai sir's nephew through marriage of his wife. Yee's older cousin. He has been in love with his cousin Yee since childhood but she sees him only as a brother. He is very protective of Yee and will stand up for her if he thinks she is being bullied. He is rich since his parents left him with a huge inheritance and he owns a high end tea shop. He's a bit slow and dimwitted because of his innocent nature. After Yee marries Chung, he is heartbroken but later gets to know Chung's younger half sister and date her.

- Kwok Fung 郭鋒 as Chan Ging 陳勁

Chun's cheapskate father. His first wife died but he has since remarried Shum Lou Lou. He works as a driving instructor. He is an extreme cheapskate and likes to take advantage of people for his convenience. Due to his extreme cheapness on not wanting to spend any money on his family, his wife had thought he has another family outside.

- Mannor Chan 陳曼娜 as Shum Lou Lou 沈露露

Chan Ging's wife and Chung's step mom. She is a nice and caring lady. Even though she didn't give birth to Chung, she loves him as her own. When Wai sir and Yee goes through a rough time saving money for her wedding, she secretly gives Wai sir her savings so Chung and Yee could get married right away. Seeing how extremely cheap her husband is, she questions if he has a woman on the side since he is not willing to spend his money on the family.

- Mary Hon 韓馬利 as Leung Cheung Siu Lan 梁張笑蘭

Nga Si's mom. She is a cooking instructor who teaches cooking classes at a recreational center. Yee and Nga Si had wanted to set her up with Wai sir since both of their parents were single and the two best friends daydreamed about being step-sisters but to their disappointment, Nga Si's mom had a boyfriend already who was the host of a cooking show in television.

- Felix Lok 駱應鈞 as Wong Ha To 黃哈托

Elaine's former college classmate and ex-boyfriend. He never really liked Elaine in more than a friend way but because her overly protective father had offended him when he dropped her off at home one day, he decided to date her just to make him mad. He returns to Hong Kong to take over his uncle's restaurant supply company and becomes Mei's new boss. He start to admire Mei and falls for her when he sees how hard she works.

- Joseph Lee Kwok Lun 李國麟 as Ng Bo Gong 吳保江

Wai sir's rival at the insurance company. He manages the other sales team that always surpasses Wai Sir's team in sales. An arrogant sore winner, he doesn't hide his glory when he teases Wai sir and his entire team for not making their monthly quota. Later when Wai sir starts taking work seriously and surpasses his quota, he uses Chung to sabotage Wai sir and Elaine's relationship.

- Lau May San 劉美珊 as 陳有裕 Chan Yau Yu

Chun's younger half sister. Ging and Lou Lou's daughter. She is immature and have a lot of her father's bad habits such as offending others and not caring and taking advantage of others. After destroying Ying Wai's sentimental pen while catching her boyfriend cheating on her she feels sorry. The two get to know each other and date at the end.

- Wong Son 黃新 as Yeung Gin 楊堅

Elaine's elderly and extremely over protective father.

- Cheung Ying Choi 張英才 as Uncle Dong 東 叔

One of the elderly man employed at the restaurant supply company Mei's works for.

- Tam Yut Ting 譚一清 as Boss Wong 黃老闆

Mei's boss at the restaurant supply company and Ha To's uncle.

- Timmy Ho 何寶生 as Sue

Yee's boyfriend who she met while studying abroad. They come back to Hong Kong together. Wai sir originally thought he was a girl because of his name. He has another girlfriend named Sandy on the side that helps him lie to Yee when they are together.

- Angela Tong 湯盈盈 as Sandy

Sue's other girlfriend who knows about Yee but doesn't mind and find it amusing that Sue has another girlfriend.

- Wallis Pang 彭子晴 as Kwan Tsi Ling 關芝玲

Chung's high school crush. She works as a model. Chung originally thought she was a pure sweet girl, but she turned out to be a home wrecker who is a mistress to a married man.

== Reception ==
Moments of Endearment was well received by audiences. The drama made household names of Nick Cheung, Miriam Yeung and Michael Tse. With the popularity of Michael Tse's character as the feminine Fai, TVB offered Tse an artiste contract with the television station. Even though the two main leads have since become major stars in Hong Kong, Taiwan and Mainland China, TVB has never released Moments of Endearment on DVD or VCD, fans can only re-watch the drama during rebroadcast or on streaming websites.
