= My Father's Son (TV series) =

Hong Kong television series

- Promo poster
- Also known as: Quarreling Family
- 鬥氣一族
- Genre: Modern Drama, Comedy
- Created by: Hong Kong Television Broadcasts Limited
- Written by: Greg Page
- Starring: Ha Yu; Lau Dan; Angelina Lo; Stephen Chow; Sandra Ng; Dickson Lee; Bonnie Law; Cutie Mui
- Theme music composer: Alan Tam
- Opening theme: From The Same Root 同根生 by Alan Tam
- Country of origin: Hong Kong
- Original language: Cantonese
- No. of episodes: 20

Production
- Producer: Catherina Tsang
- Production location: Hong Kong
- Editor: Sandy Shaw
- Camera setup: Multi camera
- Running time: 45 minutes
- Production company: TVB

Original release
- Network: TVB Jade
- Release: 4 July – 29 July 1988

My Father's Son
- Chinese: 鬥氣一族
- Literal meaning: "Quarreling Family"
Transcriptions
Standard Mandarin
- Hanyu Pinyin: dòu qì yī zú
Yue: Cantonese
- Jyutping: dau3 hei3 jat1 zuk6

My Father's Son (Chinese: 鬥氣一族; Jyutping: dau3 hei3 jat1 zuk6; literally "Elegant Transformation") is a 1988 Hong Kong modern comedy television drama created and produced by TVB, starring Ha Yu, Lau Dan, Angelina Lo, Stephen Chow, Sandra Ng, Dickson Lee, Bonnie Law and Cutie Mui as the main cast, produced by Catherina Tsang. First original broadcast began on Hong Kong's TVB Jade channel July 4 till July 29, 1988 every Monday through Friday during its 7:10 to 8:10pm timeslot with a total of 30 episodes.

The drama is Stephen Chow and Sandra Ng's first of many later collaborations.

== Synopsis ==
Tang Yan Wai (Ha Yu) is a poultry shop owner and seller. He's a widow with two grown sons. He falls in love with his customer Lee Siu Kiu (Angelina Lo) and finds excuses to see her. One day while making a delivery to her home he sees her crying outside saying she has lost everything in the stock market. He proposes to her and tells her he will take care of her. Thinking marrying Siu Kiu will be good for his family since his sons have never had a mother figure in the lives before, however his sons Tang Ka Fat (Stephen Chow) and Tang Yuk Hin (Dickson Lee) feel uneasy suddenly having a new member in their family. Yuk Hin puts his feelings aside since he is happy for his father while Ka Fat finds ways to expose Siu Kiu as a lazy freeloader who just wants to mooch off of his father.

Yuk Hin, unlike his brother is better educated and strives for a better life. When he fails his university entrance exam his gets a job as a salesman, but also still helps out at the family poultry shop whenever he is free. Ka Fat on the other hand is lazy and without ambition. He works full-time at the poultry shop and likes to play the lotto when he feels lucky, because he plays the lotto often it leads to his encounter with the convenience store girl Wong Chor Yat (Sandra Ng), who he does not get along with. Also since he runs home often during the day he is aware of Siu Kiu's laziness and tries to expose her to other family remembers.

One day Yan Wai's older half brother Tang Yan Kit returns from the US with his family because both brothers are to inherit their father's properties. One of the properties they inherit is a duplex that was originally two separate apartments. Yan Wai has always resented Yan Kit since he had the better life growing up and had their father with him while Yan Wai had to learn to be independent growing up. He blames his hardship on Yan Kit since yan Kit's mother forbid their father from provided for him and his mother. Not wanting Yan Kit to have the duplex all to himself and because his home is scheduled to be demolished Yan Wai and his family moves into the upstairs unit. Yan Kit lets Yan Wai have his ways since he feels guilty for how his mother treated Yan Wai and his mother.

Yan Kit lives a complicated life as he has his wife Ellen, and a kept family no one knows of. His other wife Chung Han also has been living in Hong Kong with their daughter Chung Yee. The two wives meet when Ellen saves Chung Han and Siu Kiu from a mugging. The three later becomes friends and opens a beauty treatment spa together. Yan Kit finds it really hard having to divide time between Ellen and Han and scared that one day Ellen will know of his other family.

Their family is further complicated when Yuk Hin develops a crush on Yee and doesn't know that she is Yan Kit's daughter. The two become close when they work for the same company and later friends. She later develops feelings for Yuk Hin also but suppresses her feelings for him since she believes that it is incest because they are both blood cousins. After meeting Ellen and becoming close to her, Yee learns that Ellen is her father's legal wife. She soon gets entangled in her parents lies to cover up their complicated relationship. She conveys her built up stress to Yuk Hin one night, the two get drunk and accidentally spends the night together. Ashamed of what they have done, Yee becomes suicidal.

Ellen who thinks Han is single introduces her to a man. Yan Kit finds out about it and exposes his relationship with Han to Yan Wai and his family. All agree not to let Ellen know since they do not want to hurt her feelings. During an argument about selling one of their father's other properties, Yan Wai exposes Yan Kit and Han's relations in a fit of rage. After one of her daughters suicide attempts Han confesses to Yee that she is not really Yan Kit's daughter but her former boyfriend's who died in a car accident before she was born. Relieved that she is not really related to Yuk Hin, Yee and him no longer hold back their feelings for each other and start dating. Han however accepts her new boyfriends marriage proposal and leaves for the US.

During this time Yan Kit, who is trying to win Ellen back is overwhelmed and gets tricked by a worker at his company into signing a bad business deal. Soon triads come looking for him to repay their money. Yan Wai who has never liked Yan Kit comes to his rescue when Yan Kit gets beaten by triads who have invaded their home. Yan Wai realizes how much he cares for his brother and helps him clear his name. The two form a friendly relationship. Ellen also comes back to Yan Kit and announce that she is pregnant.

== Cast ==
=== Tang Yan Wai's family ===
- Ha Yu as Tang Yan Wai

Lee Siu Kiu's husband. Tang Ka Fat and Tang Yuk Hin's father. He owns a live poultry shop. Since he is the son of his father's second wife, he grew up without a father> He does not like his half-brother Tang Yan Kit since his mother forbid their father from provided for him and his mother and holds a grudge against Yan Kit for growing up with hardship.

- Angelina Lo as Lee Siu Kiu

Tang Yan Wai's newly wed wife. Originally his customer, she comes to his shop in a Rolls-Royce making him believe she is rich. When Yan Wai sees her crying over losing all of her money in front her home, he consoles her and proposes marriage. Later it is found out that was really a maid and had to work to provide for her drug addicted brother.

- Stephen Chow as Tang Ka Fat

Tang Yan Wai's oldest son. He works at his father's shop and does not have any ambitions, only dreaming about winning the lotto. He does not get along with the convenience store girl Wong Chor Yat because they often argue. The two later coincidentally sign up for the same acting class and get to know each other when the teacher pair them up. He eventually fall for her.

- Dickson Lee as Tang Yuk Hin

Tang Yan Wai's younger son and Tang Ka Fat's brother. Unlike his brother he is more educated. He develops a crush on Chung Yee when she comes to the poultry shop to buy live chickens for a project. The two later become co-workers. Both like each other but do not dare date because they think they are blood cousins and instead date their co-workers. It is late when Yee's real parentage is revealed that they start dating.

- Ha Ping as Aunt Mui

Tang Yan Kit and Tang Yan Wai's aunt. She is their father's younger sister.

=== Tang Yan Kit 's family ===
- Lau Dan as Tang Yan Kit

Tang Yan Wai's older brother. Ellen's husband and Chung Han's common law husband. He gets tricked by Han into believing Yee is his daughter because she wanted someone to take care of them. He tries to get along with Yan Kit because he feels guilty about how his mother treated him and his mother, but Yan Kit is unfazed by his kindness.

- Wong Hoi Yan as Ellen Lam

Tang Yan Kit's legal wife. She is oblivious of her husband's other family and even becomes friends and business partners with his other wife. When she finds out about her husbands secret she ask for a divorce, but the two later reconcile and she finds out she is pregnant.

- Chan Ka Yee as Chung Han

Tang Yan Kit's common law wife and Chung Yee;s mother. She tricks Yan Kit into believing he is the father of her unborn child because her boyfriend died in a car accident and she wanted someone to take care of her and her child. She later tells her daughter the truth and leaves Hong Kong to marry her new boyfriend.

- Bonnie Law as Chung Yee

Chung Han's daughter and Tang Yan Kit's supposed daughter. She has feelings for Yuk Hin but thinks it's incest so she suppresses her feelings for him. Stress from her parents arrangement and her feelings for Yuk Hin causes her to become emotional and suicidal.

=== Extended cast ===
- Sandra Ng as Wong Chor Yat

The convenience store girl who Tang Ka Fat does not get along with. When the two get paired up in acting class they start to develop feelings for each other.

- Cutie Mui as

Tang Yuk Hin and Chung Yee's co-worker. She has a crush on Yuk Hin and hates Yee when she finds out Yuk Hin likes Yee.

- Eddie Ng as Sandy

Tang Yuk Hin and Chung Yee's co-worker. He likes Yee and the two start dating when she suppresses her feelings for Yuk Hin.

- Suen Kwai Hing as

A middle aged man who works at Tang Yan Wai's poultry shop. He marries a mainland girls that is young enough to be his daughter.
