= The Seasons (TV series) =

- 季節
- Starring: Tang Pik-wan; Chu Sui-tong; Lo Hoi-pang; Angelina Lo; Kwok Fung; Johnny Ngan; Lam Kin-ming; Gallen Lo; Kiki Sheung; Law Lan
- Country of origin: Hong Kong
- No. of episodes: 389

Production
- Running time: 15 Minutes

Original release
- Network: TVB
- Release: 1987 – 1988

The Seasons (Chinese: 季節) was a 389-episode drama series that was shown during Enjoy Yourself Tonight on Hong Kong TV station TVB from 1987 to 1988. The show, being a section of the main program, Enjoy Yourself Tonight (EYT), meant that it was only 15 minutes long, a rarity in Hong Kong television drama programs. Another rarity is that each episode ends in the same shot: a flower being tossed into the water.

== Cast ==
=== Tong family ===
First Generation

Cast	Role	Description
Chu Sui-tong	Tong Tai 唐泰	
Tang Pik-wan	Lee Suk-duk 李淑德	Tong Tai's wife
Sheung Kei	Leung Wing-kam 梁詠琴	Tong Tai's mistress
Lo Hoi-pang	Tong Yan 唐仁	Tong Tai's younger half brother
Chan Ka-yi	Lan	Tong Yan's wife
Angelina Lo	Tong Lai-chu 唐麗珠	Tong Tai's younger sister
Tam Ping-man	Lee Wing-leung 李永良	Lee Suk-duk's brother
Chong Man-Ching	Tam Fung-mei 譚鳳媚	Lee Wing-leung's second wife
Law Lan	Fong	Lee Suk-duk's maid

Second Generation

Cast	Role	Description
Samuel Kwok	Tong Gui-chuan 唐貴全	Tong Tai's illegitimate son
Johnny Ngan	Tong Ka-wai 唐家偉	Tong Tai and Lee Suk-dak's eldest son
Lam Kin-ming	Wu Yuk-ho 胡玉河	Tong Ka-wai's wife
Gallen Lo	Tong Ka-lai 唐家禮	Tong Tai and Lee Suk-dak's second son
Yiu Ching-ching	Tong Ka-man 唐嘉文	Tong Tai and Lee Suk-dak's daughter
Tony Leung Chiu-wai	3d	Tong Tai and Lee Suk-dak's youngest son
Dickson Lee	Hong	Tong Yan's son
Yuen Chun-yu	Lee Chi-tim 李志添	Lee Wing-leung's son
Lee Ka-ting	Sing	Wu Yuk-ho's elder brother

Other cast

Cast	Role	Description
Yi Lei	Uncle Lai 孻叔	
Kiki Sheung	Chow Pui-ching 周珮青	Tong Gui-Chuan's Wife
Yu Chi-ming	富	
Jamie Chik	冰	TVB Actress
Carrie Ng	Hong Tsz-mei 康子媚	Tong Ka-Wai's mistress
Rebecca Chan	Yip Ching 葉青	
Francis Ng	Mr. Cheung	aka King
Sandra Lang	Mrs. Chow	Chow Pui-ching's mother
Maria Cordero	Maria	Filipino maid
Margie Tsang	Maggie	Maria's daughter
Kenneth Tsang	Hak 鍾克強	
Lydia Shum	Mrs. Ho 何太	Hak's sister
Eddie Cheung	Ivan	Tong Lai-Chu's brother in-law
Elliot Ngok	Ah Ho 阿豪	Ying Ying's Father
Sara Lee	Ying Ying 瑩瑩	
Ellen Chan		
Carol Cheng		
Alex Man		
Dominic Lam		
Ng Man Tat		
Wayne Lai		Chow Pui-ching's cousin
Bobby Au-yeung		Chow Pui-ching's old boyfriend
Tai Chi-wai		Yip Ching's husband

== Background ==
In the 1980s. EYT was steadily losing viewers as other modes of entertainment becomes available. The program was conceived by EYT producers to counter the loss of viewership. The show, along with two other short-form programs (one was a mystery program, the other a comedy), did much to revive EYT, and allowed it to return to viewership supremacy.

== References in popular culture ==
Due to the immense popularity of the show, the show was referenced in the movie It's a Mad Mad Mad World 2, starring fellow EYT alum Lydia Shum. In a section of the film, Shum's character, along with her husband (portrayed by Bill Tung), desperately needed money to return to Canada. They returned to the Public Housing estate where they used to live, and try to find their old mahjong-playing neighbors for emergency cash. When they arrived, they found these neighbors children playing mahjong, who said that their parents are watching The Seasons, and will not move or go anywhere unless a fire has started. This led to the couple screaming fire, resulting in everyone from the estate streaming out of their homes.
