= Maria Chen =

New Zealand architect

Maria Xia Chen
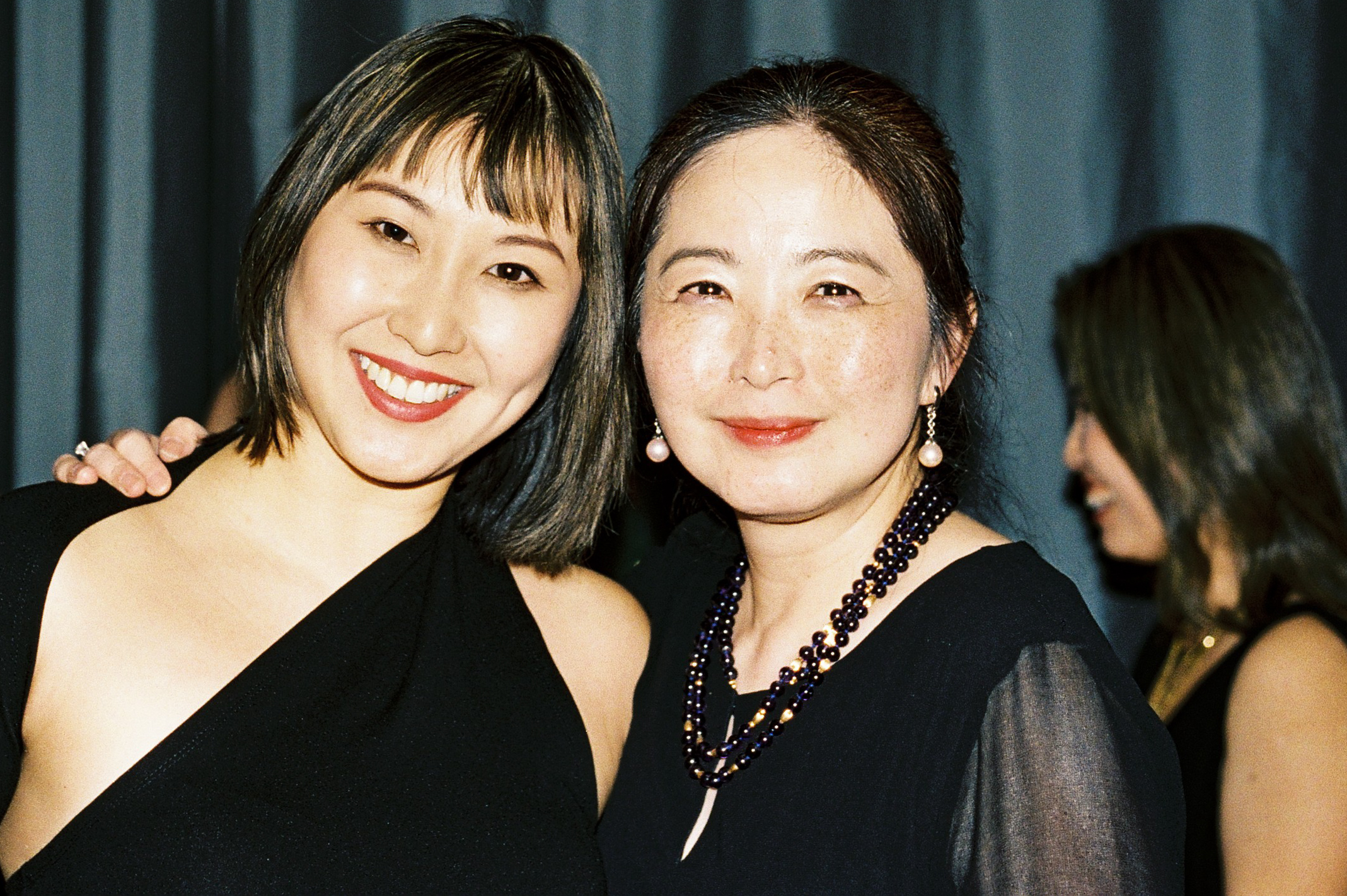
- Chen (left) with Anner Chong, at the A+W NZ Awards in 2023
- Education: University of Auckland
- Occupation: Architect
- Awards: New Zealand Institute of Architects Award
- Practice: Athfield Architects
- Buildings: University of Canterbury commerce building

Maria Xia Chen is a New Zealand architect and a former co-chair of Architecture + Women NZ.

== Biography ==
Chen grew up in Christchurch and studied architecture at the University of Auckland. After graduating, she worked in New York and London before returning to Christchurch in 2013 with a desire to contribute to the city's rebuild following the 2011 Christchurch earthquake.

Chen joined Athfield Architects and her first project was to lead the re-fit of the former Commerce building at the University of Canterbury. The building was designed by Athfield Bellerby Vial and opened in 1996, but the earthquakes had caused severe damage and it required extensive repairs. The building was renamed Rehua and reopened in 2019 to house the university's College of Education.

In 2017, Chen joined Architecture + Women NZ as liaison between the Canterbury branch of the New Zealand Institute of Architects and the Christchurch chapter of Architecture + Women. From 2021 to 2023, Chen was a co-chair of Architecture + Women NZ.

== Awards and recognition ==
In 2019, Chen and Paul Anselmi won a New Zealand Institute of Architects Award for their residential project in Christchurch, New Zealand. The project also won a Resene Total Colour Residential Interior Award.
