= Nancy Sit =

Hong Kong actress

Nancy Sit MH
- 薛家燕
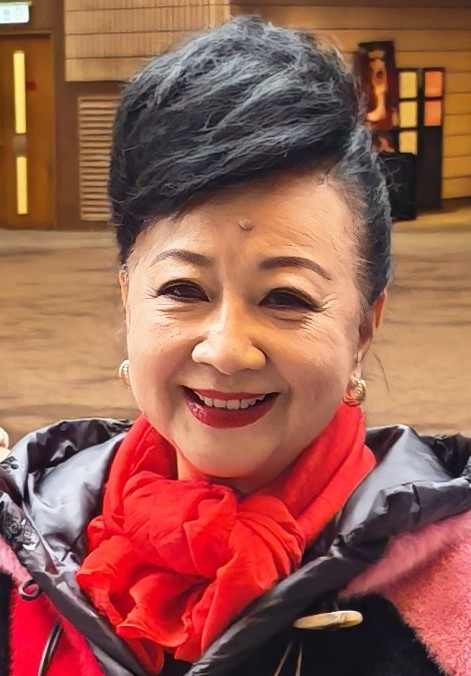
- Sit in December 2025
- Born: 30 March 1950 (age 76); British Hong Kong
- Education: SKH All Saints' Middle School
- Years active: 1960s–present
- Spouse: Shek Bo-hing (m. 1984; div. 1995)
- Children: 3
- Awards: TVB Anniversary Awards – All-Time Most Memorable Female Leading Roles; 1999 A Kindred Spirit; My Favourite Television Character; 2000 Return of the Cuckoo; 2001 Virtues of Harmony; Best Host; 2014 Walk The Walk, Talk The Talk; Life Achievement Award; 2018

Chinese name
- Traditional Chinese: 薛家燕
Transcriptions
Standard Mandarin
- Hanyu Pinyin: Xuē Jiāyàn
Yue: Cantonese
- Yale Romanization: Sit Gāyin
- Jyutping: Sit3 Gaa1Jin3

Nancy Sit Ka-yin MH (Chinese: 薛家燕; born 30 March 1950) is a Hong Kong actress.

== Career ==
Sit's acting career dated back to the 1960s, when she was a popular teen idol alongside Connie Chan Po-chu, and Josephine Siao. Sit recorded many albums in her teens, and later served as a mentor to Anita Mui, who went on to become one of the biggest superstars in Hong Kong history.

Sit left the entertainment business after she got married and raised a family, but in the early 1990s, her marriage fell apart when her husband left her. Sit was devastated and has said she contemplated suicide. But she thought of her children, which gave her the will to continue with life. She decided to get back into show business and was able to capitalize on the popularity she had achieved as a teen idol, even though it was so many years later.

She first starred in the long-running series A Kindred Spirit, playing one of the show's central figures. It was the longest-running series in Hong Kong history, with more than 1,000 episodes.

In 1975, she appeared in Flatfoot Goes East, a film directed by Italian director Steno starring well-known actor Bud Spencer. In this film, she plays the brief and touching role of a young mother which sacrifices herself to save the life of her son Yoko (Day Golo) from a gangster band.

Sit starred in the sitcoms Virtues of Harmony and its follow-up series Virtues of Harmony II. In Virtues of Harmony, Sit played a boss of a Chinese restaurant in Ming Dynasty. She played a similar character in a modern setting in the follow-up series Virtues of Harmony II.

In 2000, Nancy was the first actress to be awarded the HKSAR Medal of Honour in Hong Kong.

In 2005, Nancy and co-star William Hung appeared in the Hong Kong movie Where Is Mama's Boy. The accompanying soundtracks included theme songs from the movie that were performed by Nancy, William and Huang Yi-Fei (Wong Yat-Fei).

Sit also visited several countries, including Singapore and Malaysia, to promote shows in which she appeared such as A Kindred Spirit, and to host the Channel U variety special.

In late 2009, rumours circulated that Sit was dealing with serious health problems (she had surgery to remove Gallstones and treat cholangitis). Around this time, she was seen walking uneasily and needing assistance in public by her daughter. By late 2010, Sit appeared to have made a full recovery.

== Filmography ==
=== Television ===
==== TVB series ====
Year	Show	Role	TVB Anniversary Awards	Notes
1995	A Kindred Spirit	Leung Yun-ho	All-Time Most Memorable Female Leading Role	
1997	A Recipe for the Heart	Yin Jan-jan		(Cameo)
2000	Return of the Cuckoo	Chu Sa-giu	My Favourite Television Character; Nominated – Best Actress (Top 5)	
2000	The Threat of Love			
2001	Virtues of Harmony	Yau Nim-chi	My Favourite Television Character; Nominated – Best Actress (Top 5)	
2002	Police Station No. 7	Wong Ying Goo		
2003	The Threat of Love 2	Fung Ying/Chu Sau Yuk/Tam Siu /Ng Sui Gil/Fok Lau Sui Bik/Lee Han		
2004	Virtues of Harmony II	Yau Nim Chi		
2007	Heavenly In-Laws	Lo Fa/Flower Queen		(warehoused)
2008	The Silver Chamber of Sorrows	Choi Siu Diep	Nominated – Best Actress (Top 10)	
2009	Born Rich	Sheung Hoi-mei		
2011	River of Wine	Kwan Wai-lan	Nominated — TVB Anniversary Award for Best Supporting Actress (Top 15)	
2014	Queen Divas	Ho Siu-lan		
2015	My "Spiritual" Ex-Lover	Nip Siu Sin		
2023	Golden Bowl	Man Tsz Chin-hung		

==== RTV / ATV series ====
Year	Show	Role	Notes
1979	Dragon Strikes 《天龍訣》	南宮明珠	
1979	It Takes A Thief《侠盗风流》	Princess Lung-siu (Chinese: 龙萧公主)	
1990	The Third Radio Station 《第三间电台》	罗咏琴	sitcom

==== Other series ====
Year	Show	Role	Notes
2000	Princess Ji Zhuang 《庄姬公主》	穆赢太后	(Taiwan Television Station Series)
2005	Love Concierge 《愛的掌門人》	谢美娇	(Media Corp Series)
2007	Double Happiness 《龙凤呈祥》		(China Central Television Series)

=== Films ===
Year	Film	Role	Notes/Ref.
1960	A Sound Judgement	二珠	
1960	The Eagle Knight and the Crimson Girl	捉月	
1960	The Grand Re-union	小神童十五寶	
1960	A Song to Remember (Part 1)	文喜郎（童年）	
1960	The Affairs of Miss Ping (Part 1)	蔡美儀（童年）	
1961	Crimson Girl	陳繼志（幼年）	
1961	A Remindful Poem	梁驊生	
1961	Tears of Isolated Phoenix	江俊華（童年）	
1961	Pagoda of Golden Snake	翠鳳（童年）	
1961	Witness for the Prosecution	佐德	
1961	Pair of Jade Butterflies	婉兒	
1961	Little Prime Minister (Part One)	小霞	
1961	Beautiful Butterfly	白小碟	
1961	Di Qing / The Hero	狄龍	
1961	Lui Bo	漢獻帝	
1961	How Prince Chen Xiang Rescued His Mother from the Dragon Lake (Part 2)	大太子 涎香	
1961	Feminine General 'Far Mok Lan'	花木棣	
1961	Conqueress	楊九妹	
1962	7 Playful Women		
1962	Laka / How Di Qing and the 5 Tigers Conquered the West	狄龍	
1962	Tragedy On The Love Bridge		
1963	The Big Revenge (Part Two)	陳小婷（童年）	
1963	The Eight Fairies' Adventures in the Eastern Sea	三太子	
1963	The Legend of Li Xia	來興	
1963	The Seven Heroes of Wudang Mountain	陳志文	
1963	Color Po Lin Tang	劉秋兒	
1963	The Sword Couple	杜力雄	
1964	The Beautiful Heaven	孔志玲	
1964	Sad Autumn	易雪兒	
1964	Bloody Palm Print	村女	
1964	Elder Sister's Story	李如豔	
1964	Mysterious Murder	秦小雪	
1964	The Snowflake Sword (Part 1)	葛煒	
1964	The Snowflake Sword (Part 2)	葛煒	
1964	The Snowflake Sword (Part 3)	葛煒	
1964	The Snowflake Sword (Part 4)	葛煒	
1965	The Six-fingered Lord of the Lute (Part 1)	鬼奴	
1965	The Six-fingered Lord of the Lute (Part 2)	鬼奴	
1965	Master Cute	飛女	
1965	A Secluded Orchid by the Sea	素玲	
1965	The Six-fingered Lord of the Lute (Part 3)	鬼奴	
1965	A Brave Young Girl's Spirit (Part 1)	康青萍	
1965	A Brave Young Girl's Spirit (Part 2)	康青萍	
1965	Book Without Words	莫如嬌 – 紅狼	
1966	You Do Me Wrong	丁淑媚	
1966	Eternal Love	春桃	
1966	Colorful Youth	蘇絲	
1966	The Elusive Golden Butterfly	宋美娥	
1966	Girls Are Flowers	Chan Chun-Chi (Chinese: 陳珍珠)	
1966	Bitter Fear	周碧華	
1967	Broadcast Queen	小菊	
1967	Seven Princesses (Part 1)	5公主 – 金剛玉	
1967	I Love A Go Go	Yan Yan (Chinese: 楊英英)	
1967	Seven Princesses (Part 2)	5公主 – 金剛玉	
1967	Prodigal in Distress	杜少红	
1967	Bunny Girl	Yuk Fan (Chinese: 阿芬)	
1967	Sister's Lover	Hui Mung-Seung Chinese: 夢霜	
1967	Every Girl a Romantic Dreamer	Suet (Chinese: 白雪雪)	
1968	Lady Songbird	王麗芳	
1968	Four Gentlemanly Flowers	方玉菊	
1968	Red Lamp Shaded in Blood	上官玉鳳	
1968	Spring in the Garden	伍小紅	
1968	The Killing Sword	小燕	
1968	Wonderful Youth	江淑嫻/女諸葛	
1968	The Saint		
1968	Beauty in the Mist	阿萍	
1969	Moments of Glorious Beauty	李安琪兒	
1969	Miss Fragrance	林小燕	
1969	The Devil Warrior	崔玉華	
1969	Sky Dragon Castle	蓋盈盈	
1969	Teddy Girls	馬碧珊	
1969	Bloody Handkerchief	鐵玫瑰	
1969	Mother Wants Me to Get Married	洪麗霞	
1969	The Swinging Bunch	劉美麗	
1969	Magic Cat	金小菊	
1969	Singing Darlings	洪芍藥	
1969	Let's Build a Family	方蘭心	
1970	Convivial Trio	陳秀麗	
1970	Three Desperados (aka The Desperados, Three Desperadoes)	黃玉蓮	
1970	The Heart-Stealer	Tien Yuan-Ching	
1970	The Lonely Rider (aka The Gallant Boy)	于文翠	
1970	The Young Girl Dares Not Homeward (aka Girl Wanders Around)	Jo Lei	
1970	I'll Get You One Day	Lee Ming-Fung (Chinese: 李鳴鳳)	
1970	The Wedding Gown	周小玲	
1970	Secret Agent No. 1		
1970	The Fascination Love	菁菁	
1970	Choi Lee Fat	余海燕	
1970	Yesterday, Today, Tomorrow	(Chinese: 羅佩嫦)	
1972	Hap Ki Do	小秀	
1972	Action Tae Kwan Do	Gwoi Ji	
1973	Love Is a 4-Letter Word		
1973	The Awaken Punch		
1973	Stranger from Canton		
1974	The Crazy T.V. Fans		
1974	Every Day Is Sunday	阿喜	
1978	The Dream of the Red Chamber		
1978	Dog Bites Dog Bone	Nancy Sit *Director, Editor, Actor	
1996	God of Cookery	Judge	
1997	Black Rose II	Black Rose	
2005	Where Is Mama's Boy?	歡媽	
2010	72 Tenants of Prosperity	Lolita	
2011	Anti-Crime Squad		
2011	It's a Great Great World		
2011	I Love Hong Kong		
2011	All's Well, Ends Well 2011	鄭宇強之母	
2014	Delete My Love	慈祥蘇花	

=== Theater ===
Year	Play
2000	Kindred Spirit Night

== Program host ==
=== Metro Radio Hong Kong ===
Year	Program	Partners
2000–2010	Families of The World United	Tam Tak-chi, Raymond Chan Chi-chuen, Ruth Tsang, etc.
2009–2011	Guangdong Pop	Carmen, Wong Sze-man
2012	Memorable Days of Nancy Sit's Performance Life	
2011–2016	Happy Family	Bob Lam Shing-bun, Ricky Fan, Wong Sze-man, Jackie Man, Bingo, etc.
2016–Present	Happy Party	Bob Lam Shing-bun, Ricky Fan, Wong Sze-man

=== TVB ===
Year	Show
2010	Stars on the Menu
2011	The Law Society of Hong Kong Law Week Specials
2012	Let’s Play With Our Food
2013	Reigning Cats and Dogs
2014	Walk The Walk, Talk The Talk
2024	From Shenzhen to Zhongshan

=== RTV ===
Year	Show
1975–1979	Nancy & Michael

== Personal life ==
Nancy Sit is one of five sisters. Sit has three children from her marriage to Shek: Jamie, Justina, and Jackson Shih. Justina and Jackson reside in the United States and Jamie with her in Hong Kong.

Since Sit was admitted to the hospital for gallstone removal in Mar 2009, as of 2010 all three of her children returned to Hong Kong to lessen her work load and start a career in Hong Kong. Justina acts as Sit's manager as well as looking after Mother Hong Kong Arts Centre.

Sit's address has been leaked after her Mid-Levels apartment was among the developments that were locked down by the Hong Kong Government on March 13, 2021, in a bid to contain a new COVID-19 outbreak.

== Accolades ==
Nancy is the first actress to be awarded the Outstanding Women Professionals Award, which she received at The Outstanding Women Professional and Entrepreneurs Awards 2014 organized by Hong Kong Women Professional & Entrepreneurs Association. The TVB variety show Walk The Walk, Talk The Talk she hosted with Wong Cho Lam also won the My Favourite TVB Variety / Infotainment Programme and My Favourite TVB Variety Show Host awards at the StarHub Awards 2014 in Singapore.

=== Performance Awards ===
Year	Association	Awards
1999	TVB Anniversary Awards	All-Time Most Memorable Female Leading Role: A Kindred Spirit – Leung Yun-ho (Ho Yee)
2000	TVB Anniversary Awards	My Favourite Television Character: Return of Cuckoo – Chu Sa-kiu (Kiu Yee)
2001	TVB Anniversary Awards	My Favourite Television Character: Virtues of Harmony Yau Nim-chi
2004	Astro Wah Lai Toi Drama Awards in Malaysia	My Favourite Character: Virtues of Harmony Yau Nim-chi
2010	Star Hub Awards 2010 in Singapore	All-Time Most Memorable Female Leading Role: A Kindred Spirit – Leung Yun-ho (Ho Yee)
2014	Star Hub Awards 2014 in Singapore	My Favourite TVB Variety / Infotainment Programme: Walk The Walk, Talk The Talk My Favourite TVB Variety Show Host : Nancy Sit & Wong Cho Lam : Walk The Walk, Talk The Talk

=== Other awards ===
Year	Association	Awards
2000	HKSAR Government	The Medal of Honour (MH)
2008	Hong Kong Communication Art Centre	Hong Kong Arts & Design Festival 2008 – Outstanding Charitable Artistes Awards
2014	Hong Kong Women Professional & Entrepreneurs Association	Outstanding Women Professional and Entrepreneurs Awards 2014 – Outstanding Women Professionals Award
