= Virtues of Harmony =

- Official poster
- Genre: Historical period sitcom
- Created by: Tsui Yu-on
- Written by: Chiu Ching-yung; Ka Wai-nam
- Starring: Nancy Sit; Frankie Lam; Michael Tse; Joyce Chen; Bondy Chiu; Cutie Mui; Louis Yuen; Yvonne Lam; Johnny Tang; Bernice Liu; Lau Dan; Stephanie Che; Joseph Lee; Hawick Lau; Johnny Ngan; Helen Ma; Timmy Hung; Sherming Yiu; Kingdom Yuen; Maggie Shiu
- Opening theme: "Virtues of Harmony" (皆大歡喜) by Nancy Sit
- Ending theme: "Who Knows My Troubles" (心事有誰知) by Nancy Sit
- Country of origin: Hong Kong
- Original language: Cantonese
- No. of episodes: 327(Overseas) 325(TVB Jade ) 164(1 hour versions)

Production
- Producer: Tsui Yu-on
- Production location: Hong Kong
- Camera setup: Multi camera
- Running time: 22–25 minutes (per episode); 42–45 minutes (DVD and Vietnamese airing)
- Production company: TVB

Original release
- Network: TVB Jade
- Release: 17 September 2001 – 28 December 2002

Related
- Virtues of Harmony II (2003–2005)

Virtues of Harmony (Traditional Chinese: 皆大歡喜) is a Hong Kong television sitcom produced by Tsui Yu-on for TVB, which originally aired on TVB Jade from 17 September 2001 to 28 December 2002. It stars Nancy Sit, Frankie Lam, Michael Tse, Joyce Chen, Bondy Chiu, Cutie Mui, Louis Yuen, Yvonne Lam, Johnny Tang, Bernice Liu, Lau Dan, Stephanie Che, Joseph Lee, Hawick Lau, Johnny Ngan, Helen Ma, Timmy Hung, Sherming Yiu, Kingdom Yuen & Maggie Shiu. The series, set in the fictional town of Chi Lik Kung Tsan, revolves around the Kam House, a new rich family during the reign of the Chenghua Emperor (late fifteenth century Ming Dynasty). The story is inspired by the 2000 TVB comedy drama Colourful Life.

Virtues of Harmony received positive reviews throughout its run, and became one of Hong Kong's most popular sitcoms of all time. Originally planned for 150 episodes, an additional 187 episodes were added to the series after achieving high viewership ratings. Virtues of Harmony spawned a sequel Virtues of Harmony II (2003), which takes place in modern-day, and an original musical (2002), which starred the same cast. The show was so popular that in 2018, TVB decided to rerun the show, with only summarizing it with 325 episodes on Tvb Jade.

== Synopsis ==
=== First story arc ===
Yau Nim-chi is the matriarch of the new rich Kam House, and a single mother of the 24-year-old Kam triplets. The Kam family owns a restaurant in town, famous for its noodles, which are notoriously cooked by Nim-chi's arrogant younger brother, Yau Nim-fu.

The bubbly Princess Sam-tin, the emperor's favorite and only child, is of age to marry, and the emperor decides to hold a contest for scholars around the capital city to compete for her hand in marriage. Nim-chi's oldest son Kam Nin, a young and intelligent fifth-ranking scholar-official working for the royal court, is forced to join the contest. Nin's future career would have remained stable if it wasn't for his frank tongue; in the contest, he writes a poem denouncing the princess for being too childish and oblivious to hardships of the common people. This angers the princess, and she demotes him to a lowly ninth-ranking official, sending him back to his hometown Chi Lik Kung Town to be the town's magistrate.

The emperor soon arranges Princess Sam-tin to marry the Persian prince after failing to find a suitor for her in the contest. Displeased, she and her eunuch Siu-yuen escapes the palace and ends up in Chi Lik Kung Town. In town, she is happy to see men working for her lily pond, but when she sees a very ugly statue of herself being built, she grows angry and smashes the statue into pieces, leading her to be tried in court, where she confronts Magistrate Nin. Nin, oblivious to the fact that she's the princess, asks her for her name. Hiding her identity, the princess invents the name "Kung Yan-so" on a whim. Upon hearing her name, Nim-chi takes the princess home, mistaking her to be the daughter of the Kam family's savior, who died to save Nin. Seeing that the Kam household is a good place for shelter, she and Siu-yuen decide to stay in the Kam household until it's safe for them to leave, simultaneously completing a chain of community labor in Nin's office as a punishment for destroying government property.

A year later, while shopping in town, a female con artist attempts to steal from Nim-chi. Nim-chi, well crafted in martial arts, stops the girl. Nim-chi sees that the girl bears a jade that belongs to the Kung family, and immediately questions the girl for her name, in which the girl replies Kung Yan-so. Shocked to see two Kung Yan-so's, Nim-chi goes home to test the Kung Yan-so residing in the Kam household, wanting to find out which girl is the real one. Nim-chi soon realizes that the Yan-so at home is a fraud, but tries to hide it from the others. Unfortunately, the household find out and pushes her out of the family, telling her that she is a fake and does not deserve to stay with the Kam's any longer. Princess Sam-tin, not wanting to reveal her true identity as the princess, tells them that her real name is Tin-sam, and promises the family that she will leave the Kam household forever. She thanks them for their hospitality and brings Siu-yuen away with her. Although she is not the true Yan-so, the princess has stayed with Nim-chi long enough to be regarded as family. Soft-hearted, Nim-chi gives the princess some money and food for her journey back home, telling her that although she has lied about her identity, she has never done anything wrong to harm the Kam family. Nim-chi then brings the real Yan-so home, only to find her much worse than the fake one. Soon, Yan-so, under influences of her boyfriend, steals all the Kam's family fortune, turning them homeless. Realizing what she has done, she attempts to retrieve the money back from her boyfriend, but gets fatally stabbed by him. Before she dies in Nim-chi's arm, she tells her that she's very sorry for what she has done. Princess Sam-tin helps the Kams retrieve their fortune, in which the Kams are very thankful of, bringing her back into the family.

A high-ranking eunuch, Eunuch Ling, comes to the Kam family and forcefully takes the princess back to the palace to marry the Persian Prince. Nin, who at that time has already fallen in love with the princess, decides to go to the capital to confront the princess to ask her if she truly loved him. Nim-chi secretly meets with the princess in the capital, hoping to convince her to elope with Nin, but Princess Sa-tin refuses to meet with Nin, lying to Nim-chi that she desires to be the Persian Queen. Devastated at what she said, Nin breaks into the palace, crying that he wants to meet the princess. Furious at Nin's breakthrough, the emperor orders the guards to behead Nin, which is stopped by the princess. Nin tells the emperor that he and the princess are in love, and questions the Persian Prince about the scrolls of Confucius and Mencius, saying that a wise man will not tear two lovers apart. The Persian Prince asks the Princess of the validity of Nin's statement, in which she says yes. The reason why she agreed to the marriage was because she wanted to keep the peace treaty between China and Persia. Nin cries that he would rather die if he cannot marry the Princess. The emperor then orders Nin to drink fatal poisonous wine, in which Nin does. In response, Princess Sam-tin cries that if he is to die, she will die with him, and also drinks the wine. Touched by the two lovers, the Persian Prince tells the emperor to cancel his marriage with the Princess. The emperor then tells Nin and Princess Sam-Tin that the liquid they drank was not poisonous liquid, but a test to see Nin's love for the princess. Overjoyed, Nin marries the Princess and brings his family to the palace to live with them.

=== Second story arc ===
The Kam family adjusting to living in the royal palace, as well as to the social aspects of court life. Each of the male members of the family are given high-ranked jobs within the palace, and Nin and Princess Sam-tin marry. The female members of the family befriend a rough looking woman named Po Ling-kau who lives on the outskirts of the palace; it is later revealed that she was formerly one of the Emperors lowly concubines. After giving her a makeover, she once again catches the Emperor's attention, putting her into conflict with the current favored concubine Man, who schemes to become Empress. Nim-chi also catches the Emperor's attention, as she physically resembles the late and disgraced former Empress, who was executed for giving birth to 'demons'. The Emperor's sister, who is comically crazy, sets her sights on Yuet, disregarding the fact he already has two wives.

Consort Man and her buffoonish brother Man Kwok-kei eventually kidnap a pregnant Po Ling-kau, with the aid of their henchman, the eunuch Ling Ling-fat. They make it appear as if Po Ling-kau has run away with a former lover (who is killed by them), and keep her hidden so Man can steal the child when it is born and make herself Empress. It is shown that she replaced the former Empress' newborn baby with a puppy, which was used as proof that the Empress was a demon, and was thus executed. The child was later abandoned in the wilderness, though it is revealed that he was taken in by a child-less couple (who never revealed his adoption): Ko Yee-hong is revealed to be the missing Prince. The former Empress is also still alive, being kept imprisoned by Man, though she is freed by her devoted eunuch Bo Lo-to. In the end, Man and her brother are charged for their crimes, imprisoned in the same grotesque manner as they did the Empress, who is re-instated and is shown to not only be grateful to the Kam family, but also holds friendly relations with Po Ling-kau. Yat becomes Consort to Ko Yee-hong due to their marriage (becoming pregnant soon after), and the Princess no longer has to worry about succession as her newfound brother will eventually become Emperor, allowing her and Nin to live happily ever after. But a tangerine changes everything. At episode 327, The tangerine fell from a tree and traveled to the future. Eventually it hits a lady and she accuses all her friends. Later on at the ending credits, the two time periods of people are shown together while matching each character between the two time periods.

== Characters ==
- Nancy Sit as Yau Nim-chi (游念慈; Jau Nimci), the matriarch of the Kam House. Prior to settling down with the Kams, she was a heroic outlaw known by the name Choi Fung-wong (賽鳳凰; meaning "the competitive fenghuang") and was part of a mountain gang. Her unsavory past often comes back to confront her.
- Frankie Lam as Kam Nin (金年; Gam Nin), the eldest son the Kam triplets. Originally a fifth-rank scholar-official residing in the capital city, Nin is demoted to a ninth-rank official after he denounces Princess Sam-tin in a poem. Nin returns to his family in Chi Lik Kung Tsan and becomes the town's magistrate. He returns to the capital city after marrying the princess, bringing his family along.
- Michael Tse as Kam Yuet (金月; Gam Jyut), the second of the Kam triplets. He has two wives–his official wife Lam Yuk-lo, who hails from a wealthy family; and concubine Shek Mei, who comes from a much poorer family. Yuet is often caught in the middle of his wives' bickering and struggles to please them both with equal attention. As he is very sickly and weak, Kam becomes very familiar with medicine, and later earns a job as a pharmacist after moving into the Palace.
- Joyce Chen as Kam Yat (金日; Gam Jat), the youngest of the Kam triplets. Yat has a strained relationship with her mother, who seemed to have paid more attention to her sickly middle brother and academically-gifted older brother when they were children. As a result, she becomes self-centered, bratty, and spoiled. She is dominating and shrill when dealing with her meek husband, though cherishes his devotion to her.
- Bondy Chiu as Lam Yuk-lo (林玉露), Yuet's official wife. She is from a proper family of equal standing with the Kams, and is vain and snooty. Having to share her husband with another, she often uses her higher status to mock her husband's concubine Mei, and the two constantly fight for Yuet's attention. Yuk-lok eventually develops a closer relationship with Mei after the two of them started bearing Yuet's children at the same time.
- Cutie Mui as Mei (石美; Sek Mei), Yuet's concubine. She is a kind country girl of humble origins, and is shown to be tomboyish, as well as very stubborn and tough. She adjusts herself to being with the more cultured Kams, but clashes constantly with Lam Yuk-lo.
- Louis Yuen as Yau Nim-fu (游念富; Yau Nimfu), Nim-chi's younger brother and the creator of the famous Kam family noodles. Always scheming his way to make more money, Nim-fu is selfish but also gullible, and relies on his older sister to save him in troubled situations. Although Nim-chi is not his biological sister, he is closest to her in the family, being privy to her past and all her secrets. He later becomes a chef in the Palace.
- Yvonne Lam as Wan Ying-kei (雲影姬; Wan Jinggei), Nim-fu's wife. She is kind-hearted, but is shown to be eccentric and very scatter-brained. Her husband is often exasperated at her antics, constantly reprimanding her.
- Johnny Tang as Ko Yee-hong (高爾康; Go Jihong), Yat's submissive husband. A homeless scholar, Yat initially did not have any good feelings for him, but Yee-hong won Yat's heart after he spent an entire night washing dishes in her place, a deed that Yat was originally punished to do when she forgot to bring money to pay her meal at a restaurant. After moving into the Palace, he earns a job at the Palace Library. He is later revealed to be the Emperor's missing son.
- Karen Lee as Siu Hong (小紅), a servant of the Kam (金) family.
- Bernice Liu as Princess Sam-tin (深田公主; Samtin), the Emperor's only daughter. She and her eunuch, Siu-yuen, escape the palace to escape from her marriage to the Persian prince, and ends up in Chi Lik Kung Tsan. She meets the Kams, and Nim-chi mistakes her for the daughter of the family's savior. The Princess then takes up the name Kung Yan-so (恭欣素) to cover her identity, and stays with the Kam. She falls in love with Nin, and marries him.
- Hawick Lau as Yuen Sau (阮壽; Jyun Sau), the Princess' personal eunuch and best friend. Born Yuen King-dan (阮鯨單), he entered the palace at a young age and is referred to as Siu-yuen (小阮).
- Johnny Ngan pas Shek Tai-chuen (石大川; Sek Daaicyun), Mei's father. He owns a butcher shop and enjoys the status his daughter brings him. He and his wife often try to get as much as possible from the Kams, much to the Kams' annoyance.
- Helen Ma as Chan Kiu (陳嬌; Can Giu), Tai-chuen's wife and the mother of Mei, Biu, and Tai. She is unattractive, but acts very haughty. Like her husband, she leeches off the Kams.
- Timmy Hung as Shek Biu (石彪; Sek Biu), a constable working under Nin, who is also his best friend. He is Mei's younger brother. He is later employed at the Palace as a guard, and eventually falls in love with a female palace maid.
- Sherming Yiu as Shek Tai (石娣; Sek Tai), Mei's younger sister. Though she is more traditionally feminine than her sister, she shows great prowess in martial arts. She likes to seek adventure, and after aiding him in various missions, she falls in love with the eunuch Yuen Sau.
- Lau Dan as The Emperor, who is based on the Ming Dynasty's Chenghua Emperor. Though he has a wandering eye for women, he adores and spoils his daughter. He is distressed by the choices the Princess makes, as they affect him politically, though he always puts her happiness first. He is shown to be an ultimately benevolent and fair ruler.
- Kingdom Yuen as Princess Sa-sa, (Second story arc), the Emperor's younger sister. Portrayed as being mentally unhinged, most people disparagingly refer to her as 'crazy'. The Emperor often indulges her whims, however odd they may be.
- Josephine Sam as Gui Gee (桂枝), (Second story arc), Princess Sa-sa's servant. Constantly forced to do and suffer Sa-sa's crazy antics.
- Stephanie Che as Consort Man (Second story arc), the Emperor's favorite concubine. She schemes to become Empress at all costs, though her inability conceive a child has laid back her plans. She is selfish and cruel, and is shown to be extremely manipulative, often hiding behind a veil of false kindness.
- Joseph Lee as Man Kwok-Kei (Second story arc), Consort Man's older brother. He is a security official, though is shown to be buffoonish and incompetent, being unable to utilize martial arts at all. He is subservient to his sister, and relies on her for power and influence.
- Maggie Shiu as Consort Po Ling-kau (Second story arc), the Emperor's discarded but later favorite concubine. She is a kind but incredibly blunt woman, who at first clashed with the female members of the Kam family. However, when they help her win the attentions of the Emperor, she is shown being a devoted friend, not letting her elevated status interfere with their friendship. She is adventurous and a skilled martial artist, having lived her life before as a circus performer. Her former lover from her old days eventually tries to win her back, though she refuses as she gets pregnant with the Emperor's child.
- Sugar Yau as Hoi Tong (海棠) (Second story arc), palace servant to the Kam (金) family. She moves at a very slow pace and constantly forgets the chores the Kam family assigns to her.
- Lo Ho Hai as Ling Ling-fat, high-ranking eunuch. He is flamboyantly gay, and serves as Consort Man's attendant and agent, being dispatched to do her dirty work. He is a deadly fighter, and has fought Bo Lo-to and Nim-chi herself numerous times.
- Liu Kai Chi as Bo Lo-to, high-ranking eunuch. The personal attendant of the former Empress, he is shown to be noble and devoted to clearing her name, suspecting the true nature of Consort Man. He is a skilled martial artist, and has often physically clashed with his enemy Ling Ling-fat numerous times.
