= A Kindred Spirit =

- 真情
- Genre: Drama
- Starring: Louise Lee; Lau Dan; Nancy Sit; Kwan Hoi San; Lai Suen
- Opening theme: Chan Ching Sai Syut (真情細說) performed by Joyce Lee
- Country of origin: Hong Kong
- Original languages: Cantonese; Mandarin; English
- No. of episodes: 1,128 (Hong Kong original TV broadcast edition); 590 (official releasing)

Production
- Producer: Tsui Yu On
- Running time: approx. 20 minutes (normal)/ 30 minutes (the length of some episodes are extended)/ 45 minutes (official releasing)

Original release
- Network: TVB
- Release: 15 May 1995 – 13 November 1999

A Kindred Spirit (Chinese: 真情) is a television drama series that was broadcast on TVB Jade in Hong Kong from 15 May 1995 to 13 November 1999. It is one of the longest running drama shows in Hong Kong television history (the longest being the sitcom Hong Kong 81 series). Its exceptional longevity is unusual for a city where scripted TV drama programs typically only last around 20 episodes. The total number of episodes is 1,128. One episode were aired per day, on Monday to Friday.

The show centres on a family who operates a barbecue pork (char siu) restaurant in Happy Valley, Hong Kong, and their life.

== Cast ==
As the show progressed, more and more new characters were added into the show, as in a soap opera. The show finally ended on 13 November 1999 with a lavish farewell that included all the actors who participated in the show from past to present.

=== Main cast ===
Actor	Character(s)	Notes
Louise Lee	Leung Yun Shin 梁潤善	Original cast member
Lau Dan	Lee Biu Bing 李標炳	Original cast member
Nancy Sit	Leung Yun Ho 梁潤好	Joined cast in 1996
Kwan Hoi San	Leung Yao 梁 友	Joined cast in 1995
Lai Suen	Yuen Man Guen 阮文娟	Original cast member
Ram Chiang	Lee Tim Fuk 李添福	Original cast member
Louisa So	Chan Wing Kum 陳詠琴	Original cast member, departed
Kenix Kwok	Lee Daw Foon 李多歡	Original cast member, departed in 1995
Ben Wong	Yung Heung Hoi 容向海	Original cast member
Angie Cheung	Lee Choi Yiu 李彩瑤; Ng Fong Gwai 吳芳貴	Original cast member, departed and returned
Marco Lo	Tong Lap Sang 唐立生	Joined cast in 1996
Lau Nam Kwong	Leung Yun Choi 梁潤才	Original cast member, departed
Sze Ming	Ma Yuk Yu 馬玉瑜	Original cast member, departed
Florence Kwok	Lee Daw Yan 李多欣	Original cast member
Hawick Lau	Lee Tim On 李添安	Original cast member
Sin-hung Tam	Auntie Yung (容妹 or 容姨)	Original cast member.

== Impact on Hong Kong culture ==
The show's impact on Hong Kong culture is immense, although its influence is fading away as new series are being aired. Everyone can remember the approximate arc of the story and most can sing the theme song.

The impact of the show on its cast is enormous, some actors have suffered a form of "curse" from the series, being that they can never break out of their mold that were set during this series. A good example is the actor, Timothy Cheng, who played Ji Ho in the series. His performance on the series was so convincing and memorable that it has prevented him from playing heroes or protagonists since his run on the show ended (though he did play some protagonist roles recently).

Kindred Spirit is shown in Hong Kong on TVB's Grand Theatre Channel, which belongs to TVB's new pay television services. The show continuously airs in Canada on the TVB affiliated channel, Fairchild TV.

The show was previously on rerun on Thursday, 13 September 2007 from Monday to Friday at 2:15pm on TVB Jade in Hong Kong. It currently airing from Monday to Friday at 10:00am on TVB Jade.

== See also ==
- List of longest films by running time
- List of television programs by episode count
