= LF (album) =

Studio album by Raymond Lam
- Released: July 22, 2011
- Producer: Emperor Entertainment Group

Raymond Lam chronology
First (2011)	LF (2011)	Self-Portrait (2012)

LF is Raymond Lam's sixth album. Released on July 22, 2011. The album contains 15 tracks and 5 music videos (CD + DVD). Several music videos from this album are Mandarin versions of the songs released in Raymond's previous albums, including First, Come 2 Me, Let's Get Wet, and Searching For You In Loving Memories.

== Track listing ==
=== Cd ===
1. LF (Music Only)
2. CHOK
3. Broken
4. 11:53 P.M (Music Only)
5. Baby Lady
6. 03:16 A.M (Music Only)
7. 試煉 (Trial) (Men with No Shadows themesong)
8. 06:41 A.M (Music Only)
9. Light Up My Life (My Sister of Eternal Flower themesong)
10. 我很痛 (I Am Hurt)
11. How Deep
12. OUTRASOUND (Music Only)
13. 似是而非 (國) (Specious)(Mandarin) (Ad Mania themesong)
14. 人一個 (Just a Person)
15. 熱能放送 (Broadcasting the Heat)

=== Dvd - music videos ===
1. CHOK
2. 熱能放送 (Broadcasting the Heat)
3. 再一次 (One More Time)
4. 讓我愛你一小時 (Allow Me To Love You For An Hour)
5. 換個方式愛你(國) (Change the Way of Loving You)(Mandarin)
6. 愛在記憶中找你(國) (Searching For You In Loving Memories)(Mandarin)
