= First (Raymond Lam album) =

First 第一次

Studio album by Raymond Lam
- Released: March 4, 2011
- Genre: Mandopop
- Producer: Emperor Entertainment Group

Raymond Lam chronology
Come 2 Me (2010)	First 第一次 (2011)	LF (2011)

First is Raymond Lam's fifth album and first album in Mandarin, released on March 4, 2011. The album contains 10 tracks. Several songs from this album are Mandarin versions of the songs released in Lam's previous albums, including Come 2 Me, Let's Get Wet, and Searching For You In Loving Memories. Before the album was launched, some of these songs were already released as TVB drama theme-song singles. This album took more than a year to produce, due Lam's schedule, over the past two to three years. Many of these songs were recorded in mainland China.

== Track listing ==
=== CD ===
1. 再一次 (One More Time)
2. 太熱了 (Too Hot)
3. 讓我愛你一小時 (Allow Me To Love You For An Hour)
4. 換個方式愛你(國) (Change the Way I Love You) (Mandarin)
5. 不想讓你失望 (Don't Want To Disappoint You - The Mandarin version of "所謂理想/The So-Called Ideal" from the Come 2 Me album released in 2010.)
6. 吻過吸血鬼 (Kissed A Vampire - Mandarin version of "Vampire", from the Come 2 Me album released in 2010)
7. 愛在記憶中找你(國) (Searching For You In Loving Memories) (Mandarin)
8. 一直都在(國) (Always Here) (Mandarin) (with Charlene Choi)
9. 我們很好(國) (We Are Fine) (Mandarin)
10. 長假期 (Long Holiday - Mandarin version of "定鏡/Fixed Mirror", from the Come 2 Me album released in 2010)
