= Evans Chan =

Hong Kong film director

Evans Chan 陳耀成 (www.evanschan.com), originally from Hong Kong, is a New York City–based Chinese American critic, librettist, playwright and independent filmmaker of four narrative features and thirteen documentaries — including Crossings (1994), Journey to Beijing (1998), Adeus Macau (2000), The Map of Sex and Love (2001), Bauhinia (2002), The Life and Times of Wu Zhongxian (2003), Sorceress of the New Piano (2004), and The Rose of the Name: Writing Hong Kong (2014) — which have been screened at the Berlin, Rotterdam, London, Moscow, Vancouver, AFI Docs, Seattle, and Taiwan Golden Horse film festivals, among others.

Chan’s subjects range from the geopolitical situation of Hong Kong, to Greater China’s checkered historical path toward modernity, to immigrants in post-9/11 New York, as well as portraits of artists — such as Taiwanese lesbian literary icon Qiu Miaojin, who died by suicide in Paris at 26, and Brooklyn-based Singaporean pianist Margaret Leng Tan — “the diva of avant-garde pianism” (The New Yorker) and “queen of the toy piano” (The New York Times).

For the publication of Postcolonialism, Diaspora, and Alternative Histories: The Cinema of Evans Chan (HKUP, 2015), edited by Tony Williams (1946–2026), the late British film critic and programmer Tony Rayns offered this endorsement:

“Evans Chan has made a singular contribution to Hong Kong cinema and at the same time a major contribution to the whole spectrum of contemporary filmmaking. His work achieves a seamless blend of fact and fiction to produce an innovative kind of essayistic cinema, driven equally by issues and by his own experiences and perceptions. He draws on everything from literature and political studies to journalism and social-activist campaigns for his subjects — and on everything from film history to performance art for his images. Best of all, he’s rigorously non-conformist…”(1)

== Biography ==
To Liv(e) - Liv Ullman and Post-Tiananmen Hong Kong

Chan’s directorial debut, To Liv(e) (1991), set in the former British colony shortly after the 1989 Tiananmen upheaval, was inspired by Norwegian actress Liv Ullmann’s 1990 visit to Hong Kong, where she decried the forced deportation of 51 Vietnamese refugees. The Hollywood Reporter (June 26. 1992) described the film as “filled with the kind of style, performances and ambition one might expect from a film critic turned filmmaker, and for which no apologies need be made… With a painter’s eye in capturing the bohemian fringe of the Hong Kong art scene, and the mature voice of a seasoned filmmaker, Chan examines love, family and the fate of Hong Kong, and the culture clash between East and West with equal depth and assurance.” (2)

In Scandinavia, Oslo’s Aftenposten (September 1, 1991) saw the film as “clearly inspired by the existential angst of Bergman, but also by Jean-Luc Godard’s experiments with style. Out of this a unique meeting between East and West is created.”

To Liv(e) is widely acclaimed by academic scholars and film critics. The film received Best Actress (Lindzay Chan) and Best Supporting Actress (Josephine Koo) in the Golden Horse Film Festival in 1992. To Liv(e) was later listed by Time Out as one of the 100 Best Hong Kong Films (3)

Crossings - inspired by real-life interracial murder in the New York subway

Chan’s sophomore outing was Crossings (1994), a Hong Kong diasporic drama based on a real- life murder in the New York subway. John Charles, in Hong Kong Filmography, 1977–1997 (McFarland, 2000), praised it as a “unique merging of HK cinema and the New York independent film… [Anita] Yuen [Wing-yee] is superb, making the most of a rare chance to display the full range of her talents, and Lindzay Chan gives a genuine, touching performance, projecting very real intelligence and compassion.” According to Gina Marchetti, the film “provides a complex picture of the global Chinese as the narrative explores a series of 'crossings' from Hong Kong to New York, from innocence to corruption, from sanity to madness, and from life to death. Chan's evocation of lives 'in-between' cultures, genders, classes, and nations places it among the most ambitious meditations on contemporary Hong Kong to be produced to date." (4).

"China Decolonized" - Journey to Beijing (about Hong Kong in 1997) and Adeus Macau (about the Portuguese colony in 1999)

From his first film on, Chan has become a pioneer in chronicling Hong Kong’s socio-political changes over the decades. His documentary about the 1997 handover of Hong Kong from the UK to China, Journey to Beijing, was a 1999 Berlin Forum selection. Sight and Sound (July 1998) praised it for “[providing] the best corrective to the self-important and seriously off-beam international media coverage around at the time…a humane and grounded spot sample of attitudes on Hong Kong’s far from mean streets…in the same ball-park…[as] a Chris Marker film.”(5)

Chan made a sequel to Journey to Beijing as the second entry of a China Decolonized series. It was Adeus Macau (2000), about the handing back of Macau to China in 1999, after 600 years of Portuguese rule.

The Map of Sex and Love - Queer romance and a mysterious chapter of Nazi gold laundering in Asia

Chan spent his childhood in Macau, and a piece of news about the Portuguese colony being the laundering ground for Nazi gold after WWII (6) led him to explore and dramatize his family history in an episode of the fiction feature The Map of Sex and Love (2001). Time Out found the film "seductive as it negotiates the spaces between desire and inhibition" (7), whereas David Walsh at the World Socialist Web Site praised it as "intelligent and honest…[with] numerous pointed comments about culture, or the lack of it, in the contemporary world" (8). The distinguished Jewish American novelist Lore Segal (1928 – 2024) wrote to Chan, expressing her admiration for The Map, adding: "How amazing to be allowed so intimately into a world where one is a stranger. And isn't that one of the marvels of art? And I was thinking what a generous and affectionate view, finally, of our world."

Victor Ma, choreographer and founder of Y-Space (9), won a Golden Horse nomination for Best Supporting Actor for his committed performance as a queer dancer, while the affecting score, by Serbian composer Miloš Raičković, won a Best Original Music nomination, also at the 2002 Taiwan Golden Horse Film Festival.

Bauhinia - Asian diaspora and post-9/11 New York

While Chan was prepping for a commissioned narrative TV film for RTHK, the 2001 World Trade Center terrorist attacks shocked the world. When filming in New York could resume some months later, Chan incorporated the bleak experience into Bauhinia (2002). Here's Christopher Claxton's description of the film for the 2002 Hawaii International Film Festival: "In the aftermath of September 11th, film student Bauhinia (Jun Li) attempts to edit her thesis project on female infanticide brought about by China's singular child policy in a room overlooking the wreckage left by the fallen Twin Towers. Faced with an unexpected pregnancy, the Hong Kong expatriate must choose between bringing a child into a world obsessed with its own destruction and aborting a possible female life. Director Evans Chan melts the diegetic and real world boundaries to create a space that haunts not only its characters but the audience as well. In 'Bauhinia,' he captures a side of post-9/11 New York unfiltered by pop media thus consequently more truthful to the human condition."

The Life and Times of Wu Zhongxian - a Marxist rebel's journey

In 2003, Chan released The Life and Times of Wu Zhongxian, a docu-dramatic adaptation of a play co-written and performed by activist theater artist Mok Chiu Yu in commemoration of his colorful and doomed Marxist rebel friend Wu Zhongxian (Ng Chung Yin). Scott Foundas remarked that the film “manages to convey a sweeping sense of Chinese countercultural activity [in Hong Kong] throughout the decades… the cumulative effect is a profound sense of the perils by which ordinary people attempt to change the system.”(10)

Three films with Margaret Leng Tan - championing the avant-garde keyboard

Taking a break from Hong Kong politics, Chan completed a documentary, Sorceress of the New Piano: The Artistry of Margaret Leng Tan. A Brooklyn-based Singaporean avant-garde musician, Tan has been considered the foremost advocate of the so-called three Cs of post-classical pianism – [Henry] Cowell, [John] Cage and [George] Crumb. During the Q&A at the AFI/Discovery Channel’s Silverdocs Festival, where Sorceress was nominated for Best Music Documentary, Chan opined that there’s a similarity between progressive politics and avant-garde art, since both require expanding one’s imagination beyond the conventional box. Chan’s artistic partnership with Tan went way back, with his first film, To Liv(e), using tracks from Tan’s debut recording, Litania. Tan’s composer friends, such as Miloš Raičković and her Juilliard classmate, Hong Kong-based classical pianist Nancy Loo, have been musical partners in his filmmaking.

In the meantime, Chan also completed two companion documentaries: The Maverick Piano, which showcases complete performances of some of Tan’s repertoire, especially Cage’s powerfully haunting piece In the Name of the Holocaust; and one on George Crumb’s strikingly original Makrokosmos I & II, released by Mode Records on DVD. Mike Ingham noted that “Chan’s film closes with the two literary quotations…that Crumb included as para-textual material in Makrokosmos … [The filming effects] combine to maintain utter concentration in the viewer-listener, and arguably to render the performance more of a ‘total art-work’ than simply listening attentively to an audio CD version of the work.” (10a)

Datong and Kang Youwei - Modern China's pioneering reformer and utopian thinker

Chan’s next experimentation with the docu-dramatic form, after Wu Zhong Xian, resulted in a biopic of early modern China’s pioneering reformist Kang Youwei, featuring Hong Kong’s eminent character actor Liu Kai-chi in the title role, with Lindzay Chan playing Kang’s daughter Kang Tongbi, Barnard College’s first Chinese student. Kang’s crushed Hundred Days Reform of 1898 — occurring in the final decades of the Qing dynasty, China’s last imperial dynasty — inaugurated the first of several torturous reform movements in China, well into the 21st century. While in exile, Kang also exerted a significant impact on Chinese American history by organizing an anti-American boycott in 1905 to counteract the atrocious Chinese Exclusion Act (CEA). The boycott was serious enough for Theodore Roosevelt to meet him twice in order to defuse tension by relaxing the inhumane processing of Chinese entrants into the US, though the CEA was not repealed until 1943. The resulting film, Datong: The Great Society, received the 2011 Hong Kong–Shenzhen Chinese-Language Movie of the Year Award, presented by the PRC’s Southern Metropolitan Daily, for “returning fuller memories and humanity to Chinese history.” (11,12) Chan subsequently adapted his Datong film into the libretto for Datong: The Chinese Utopia, an opera composed by Chan Hing-yan and presented by the Hong Kong Arts Festival in 2015. With as much focus on Kang’s daughter Tongbi, the opera toured London in 2017 to commemorate the 20th anniversary of Hong Kong’s sovereignty changeover. It was hailed by Bachtrack as “a major new opera [that] tackles the fallout from a century of [China’s humiliation] head-on, in unique and imaginative fashion.”(13)

Chan obtained his PhD in Screen Cultures from Northwestern University. His scholarly writings have appeared in Cinemaya, Asian Cinema, Critique, Film International, and PostmodernCulture, which published “Against Postmodernism, Etc.,” one of Susan Sontag’s last important interviews, conducted by Chan.(14) Among the various anthologies Chan has contributed to is the forthcoming Oxford Handbook of Chinese American Cinema.

Chan’s Chinese-language output includes four books — Dream Tenants 夢存集 (1986); The Last of the Chinese 最後的中國人 (1998), named a notable book by Hong Kong’s Chinese Literary Biennial; From the New Wave to the Postmodern 從新浪潮至後現代 (2001); and, most recently, About Time 時候 (2022). He has edited and translated into Chinese three award-winning volumes of Susan Sontag’s writings, including Regarding the Pain of Others and Under the Sign of Saturn. Each was listed by the Taiwan Book Fair as one of the top ten nonfiction titles of the year.

He has taught at Hong Kong’s Lingnan University, the Pratt Institute in Brooklyn, and New York University.

== Filmography ==
Title Year Runtime Genre

- To Liv(e) 浮世戀曲 1992 105 min Narrative Feature
- Crossings 錯愛 1995 98 min Narrative Feature
- Journey to Beijing 北征 1999 112 min Documentary
- Adeus Macau 澳門二千 2000 65 min Documentary
- The Map of Sex and Love 情色地圖 2001 125 min Narrative Feature
- Bauhinia 紫荊 2002 50 min Narrative Feature
- The Life and Times of Wu Zhong Xin 吳仲賢的故事 2003 80 min Docu-Drama
- Makrokosmos 宏觀宇宙 I & II 2004 65 min Documentary/MV
- Sorceress of the New Piano – The Artistry of Margaret Leng Tan 靈琴新韻 2004 98 min Documentary
- The Maverick Piano 獨行琴 2007 96 min Documentary/MV
- Datong: The Great Society 大同：康有為在瑞典 2011 114 min Docu-Drama
- Chinatopia (aka Two or Three Things About Kang Youwei) 新世紀的康有為 2014 72 min Documentary
- The Rose of the Name: Writing Hong Kong 名字的玫瑰 — "董啟章"地圖 2014 112 min Documentary
- Datong: The Chinese Utopia 大同 2015 104 min Opera Documentary
- Raise the Umbrellas 撐傘 2016 117 min Documentary
- Love and Death in Montmartre 蒙馬特之愛與死 2019 105 min Documentary
- We Have Boots 我們有雨靴 2020 129 min Documentary

== Awards and Honors ==
- To Liv(e) (1992)

 Best Actress Award, Taiwan Golden Horse Film Festival

 Best Actress Award, Portuguese Sintra Film Festival

 Best Supporting Actress, Taiwan Golden Horse Film Festival

 Special Jury Prize, Singapore Film Festival

- The Map of Sex and Love (2001)

 Best Film nominee, Jeonju International Film Festival

 Best Supporting Actor nominee, Taiwan Golden Horse Film Festival

 Best Film Score nominee, Taiwan Golden Horse Film Festival

- Sorceress of the New Piano (2004)

 Best Music Documentary nominee, AFI/Discovery Channel's Silverdocs Festival

 Best Contemporary Music Film, CD magazine (Spain)

- Datong: The Great Society (2011)

 Best Chinese-Language Film of the Year, Southern Metropolitan Daily

- Love and Death in Montmartre (2019)

 Best Film nominee, Hamburg International Queer Film Festival

- We Have Boots (2020)

 Edward Snowden Documentary Award, Internationales Festival Zeichen der Nacht
