= Xun Qin Ji =

Xun Qin Ji (尋秦記) may refer to following videos adapted from Huang Yi’s novel:

- A Step into the Past, a 2001 Hong Kong television series
- Back to the Past, an upcoming Hong Kong historical science fiction action film

== See also ==
- The dictionary definition of 尋 at Wiktionary
- The dictionary definition of 秦 at Wiktionary
- The dictionary definition of 記 at Wiktionary
