= Twin of Brothers =

2004 Hong Kong wuxia television series

- Promo poster
- 大唐雙龍傳
- Genre: Material Heroes
- Starring: Raymond Lam; Ron Ng; Tavia Yeung; Leila Tong; Nancy Wu; Li Qian; Christine Ng
- Opening theme: Seung Tsi Lung (雙子龍) performed by Raymond Lam
- Country of origin: Hong Kong
- Original language: Cantonese
- No. of episodes: 42

Production
- Running time: 45 minutes per episode

Original release
- Network: TVB
- Release: July 19 – September 12, 2004

Twin of Brothers
- Traditional Chinese: 大唐雙龍傳
- Simplified Chinese: 大唐双龙传
- Literal meaning: Story of the Twin Dragons of Great Tang
Transcriptions
Yue: Cantonese
- Jyutping: Daai6 Tong4 Soeng1 Lung4 Cyun4

Twin of Brothers is a 2004 Hong Kong television series based on the novel Story of the Twin Dragons of Great Tang by Wong Yee. It was broadcast on TVB.

== Plot ==
Wacky wannabe swordsmen Chong and Ling accidentally acquire the mysterious "Longevity Martial Arts", which is rumoured to be the key to a huge treasure. The target of numerous people who covet the treasure, the two friends adventure through China despite the danger. In their journey, Ling meets two girls from two opposing sects, while Chong falls for the sister of the future emperor of China. With their extraordinary experiences, will the two become heroes amidst the historical turbulence?

== Cast ==
Note: Some of the characters' names are in Cantonese romanisation.

Main Character

- Raymond Lam as Kou Chong
- Ron Ng as Tzui Zhi Ling
- Tavia Yeung as Lee Sau Ling
- Leila Tong as Szee Fei Hyun / Shek Ching Shuen
- Nancy Wu as Wan Wan
- Li Qian as Sung Yuk Chi

Support Characters

- Christine Ng as Fu Guan Chek and Fu Guan Yu
- Waise Lee as Yu Man Fa Kup
- Joel Chan as Yu-man Chi-kap
- Savio Tsang as Sek Ji Hin
- Yvonne Yung as Zhu Yu Yan
- Lau Kong as Lee Yun
- Mark Kwok as Lee Kin Sing
- Anthony Tang as Lee Yeun Gut
- Derek Kwok as Hau Hei Pak / Shadow Assassin
- Mary Hon as Fan Ching Wai
- Wilson Tsui as Lee Mut
- Jimmy Au as Lee Cheng
- Law Lok-lam as Sung Kuet
- Rubyanne Choi as Dung Sok Ne
- Andy Dai as Yum Siu Ming
- Timothy Zao as Wong Yun Ying
- Ellesmere Choi as Dok Gu Chak
- Ricky Wong as Yeung Gwong
- Henry Lo as Bin But Fu
- Newton Lai as Wong Sai Chung
- Johnson Yuen as Lee Sai Man

Guest Star

- Hung Lit Chan as Fu Choi Lam
- Gordon Liu as Lee Lee Seung

== International broadcast ==
- Thailand - Aired on Channel 3 in early September 2004, dubbed as mạngkr khū̀ s̄ū̂ s̄ib thiṣ̄ ("มังกรคู่สู้สิบทิศ", literally: Double dragons fighting in ten directions).
