= Your Love (Raymond Lam album) =

Studio album by Raymond Lam
- Released: September 24, 2008
- Genre: Cantopop
- Producer: Emperor Entertainment Group

Raymond Lam chronology
Searching for You in Loving Memories (2007)	Your Love (2008)	Let's Get Wet (2009)

Your Love is Raymond Lam's second album, released on 10 September 2008. It contains ten tracks. The second version was released two weeks later on 24 September with three extra music videos. Lam achieved platinum level on 10 October 2008 in Hong Kong by surpassing 90,000 copies in sales.

== Track listing ==
1. 愛不疚 Love Without Regret (Moonlight Resonance Ending Theme)
2. 愛人與海 Lover and Sea
3. Tonight
4. 明天以後 (林峯/泳兒) After Tomorrow (Cantonese version duet with Vincy Chan)
5. 憑良心說再見 Saying Goodbye With Conscience
6. 影子的愛情故事 Shadow's Love Story
7. 浮生若水 Living As Gentle As Water (The Master of Tai Chi Ending Theme)
8. All About Your Love
9. 夏雪 Summer Snow
10. 明天以後 (國語)(林峯/泳兒) After Tomorrow (Mandarin version duet with Vincy Chan)
