= Milos Raickovich =

Miloš Raičković may refer to:

- Miloš Raičković (footballer) (born 1993), Montengerin footballer
- Miloš Raičković (composer) (born 1956), Serbian-American composer
