= Case of Yang Naiwu and Little Cabbage =

Qing dynasty miscarriage of justice

Death of Zhejiang Commoner Ge Pinlian
- Court: Ministry of Justice
- Argued: 30 November 1873
- Decided: 13 February 1877 (Ministry of Justice)

Case history
- Appealed from: Zhejiang provincial court (first decided 25 December 1873)

Outcome
- Death penalty of Yang Naiwu and Little Cabbage overturned by caning; At least 10 officials sacked

Laws applied
- Great Qing Legal Code

Keywords
- Miscarriage of justice; Capital punishment

The case of Yang Naiwu and Little Cabbage (Chinese: 楊乃武與小白菜案), officially the death of Zhejiang commoner Ge Pinlian (浙江民人葛品連身死案), was one of the most infamous miscarriages of justice in the Qing dynasty of China. Yang Naiwu (楊乃武), a juren who had just passed the provincial civil service examination, was falsely accused of poisoning Ge Pinlian (葛品連) to death in a conspiracy with Ge's wife nicknamed Little Cabbage (Chinese: 小白菜; pinyin: Xiǎo Báicài) in 1873. The case became a cause célèbre as both were forced to admit guilt amid continuous coverage by newspaper Shun Pao. Following multiple appeals and re-trials, the Ministry of Justice handed lenient sentences to Yang, Mrs. Ge, and witnesses accused of perjury. The ministry also fired multiple officials responsible for the unfair convictions.

Scholars considered this as a landmark case in Qing's legal development due to large-scale involvement from the imperial court to local bureaucrats, and the widespread attention from the public and media which extensively recorded the development of this event.

== Background ==
=== Death penalty ===
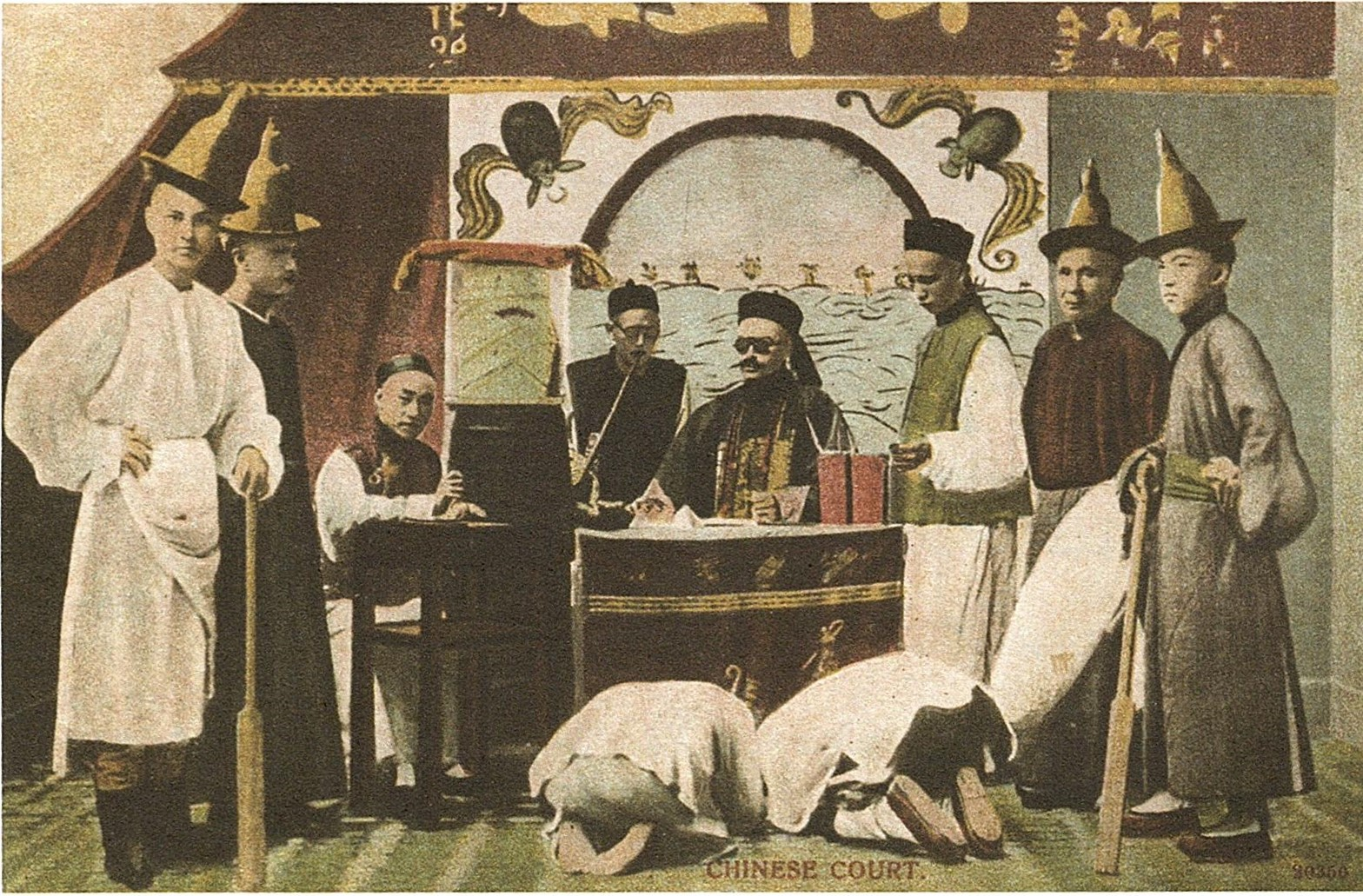
Local official of Qing presiding a judicial case

China had long established the Five Punishments since ancient times: whipping, caning, penal labour, banishment, and death. The Great Qing Legal Code authorised execution by hanging or beheading, although other kinds of death penalty were also implemented. Unless immediate execution was ordered, otherwise inmates remained on death row, pending review and final judgement by the imperial court known as the autumn trial system. The law empowered only the emperor to issue a death penalty. Governors can sentence defendants to penal labour or banishment, while local officials may only order caning or whipping.^{:2-6}

Lawsuits that carry execution as penalty were usually investigated first at the local level. Public may file lawsuit on the 3rd, 6th, 8th, or 9th day of a Chinese calendar month, but major lawsuits can be lodged at anytime, such as the initial proceeding of this case which happened ten days after the death of Ge. Serious matters that involve punishments apart from whipping and caning, which cannot be enforced at county-level, would require review by prefectural and provincial governments before being transferred to the imperial court. Capital punishments would go through three stages in Peking, with the Ministry of Justice delivering the verdict, the Censorate to supervise, and the Judicature to review and correct any mistakes. Nonetheless, most of the power fell to the ministry, as the Judicature rarely quashed convictions, and so did the Emperor.^{:20-37}

The imperial court delegated power of execution to local officials in order to quell unrests in the aftermath of the Taiping Rebellion. Unjust verdicts sharply increased to an unprecedented level with officials, now so powerful that can end one's life, harbouing one another and even interfering trials at the central government.

=== Appeal ===
Appeal (上控) must be lodged step by step, first to prefecture, then circuit, province, and finally to the Censorate. Leapfrogging would face whipping. Apart from hearing the appeal, the superior court may revert the case back to the court of first instance, or transfer to other county court, although in reality most of the bids were re-tried at the court of first instance. If the appeal was rejected at all four levels, it may be lodged directly to Censorate, Office of Transmission, or Nine Gates Infantry Commander known as "appeal to the capital" (京控). The last resort is to send a petition to the emperor (叩閽 or 直訴) with a stringent hearing threshold. Lawsuits unrelated to important matters of the state and the military, grave corruption, and serious miscarriages of justices were barred from petitioning, and petitioners would be caned for troublemaking. The threshold was slightly lowered in 1668 to allow petitioning of any monumental matters.

== Death ==
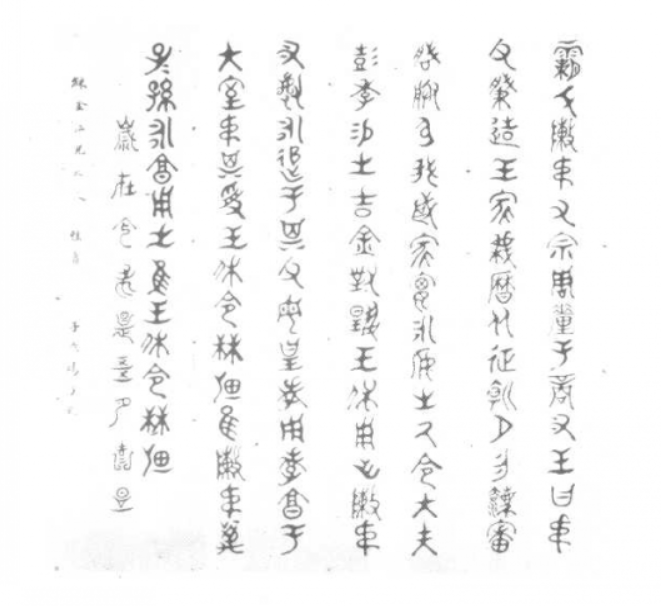
Calligraphy of Yang

Ge Pinlian, born in Yuhang, Hangzhou of Zhejian Province, married Little Cabbage, stepdaughter of his distant maternal cousin in around April 1873. Little Cabbage was born in 1855^{:4} in Cangqian, a neighbourhood of Yuhang.^{:4} Her birth name is Bi Shengu (畢生姑) and later known as Mrs. Ge-Bi (葛畢氏). "Little Cabbage" was believed to be named after her beauty and her favourite outfit of white shirt and green dress.^{:2-3} Mrs. Ge was suspected of adultery just few months into the marriage after she was found to have a close companionship with Yang Naiwu. Yang, also a Yuhang local who was in his late 30s at the time of slaughter, (Note: In his testimony to Hu Ruilan Yang said he was 39, which would date his birth year at circa 1836.^{:49} However, the second imperial appeal as cited by Shen Pao mentioned his age at 36, which gave a birth year at around 1838.^{:22}) was the only juren of Yuhang in the 1873 provincial exam.^{:11}^{:49} His house was damaged during the Taiping Rebellion, and after renovations, was rented to Ge and his newlywed a month after their wedding because Ge was unable to afford one.^{:49} For most of the time Ge Pinlian worked at a shop and rarely returned home.^{:45-47}

Ge began to suspect his wife's disloyalty in around September after he witnessed multiple times Little Cabbage sitting with Yang for dinner. Although having no evidence of adultery, he told his mother Madam Shen of his concerns. Madam Shen saw the pair's close relationship and started spreading the news with other villagers. Few months later, Ge moved to another house as Yang planned to increase the rent. (Note: From Memorial to the throne by Ministry of Justice on the proposed resolution after the concluded trial of the death of Zhejiang Commoner Ge Pinlian (刑部折——浙江民人葛品連身死案審明定擬由) in 1877.^{:94-97}) Yang also stopped meeting Madam Ge.^{:2-4}

On 15 October, Little Cabbage was assaulted by her husband for not buying pickles. Furious and angered, Little Cabbage threatened to become a nun. Ge Pinlian defended his violence as a retaliation of his wife's disloyalty. Few days later, on 28 October, Yang's wife, who was said to have a heated argument before her obstructed labour, died, fuelling the stories between Yang and Little Cabbage.^{:49}^{:9}

On 26 November, Ge, who once had erysipelas, found out his knees were swelling. Ignoring his wife's plea to take a leave, he started vomiting when he walked back home from work next morning. Soon after, he was foaming at the mouth and ranting on bed. His relatives and friends visited him and asked for medical attention. A doctor diagnosed Ge with shaqi (痧氣) and attempted to rescue him with sacred lily, but to no avail. At the hour of shen (申時, after 3 p.m.), Ge was pronounced dead.

== Trial ==
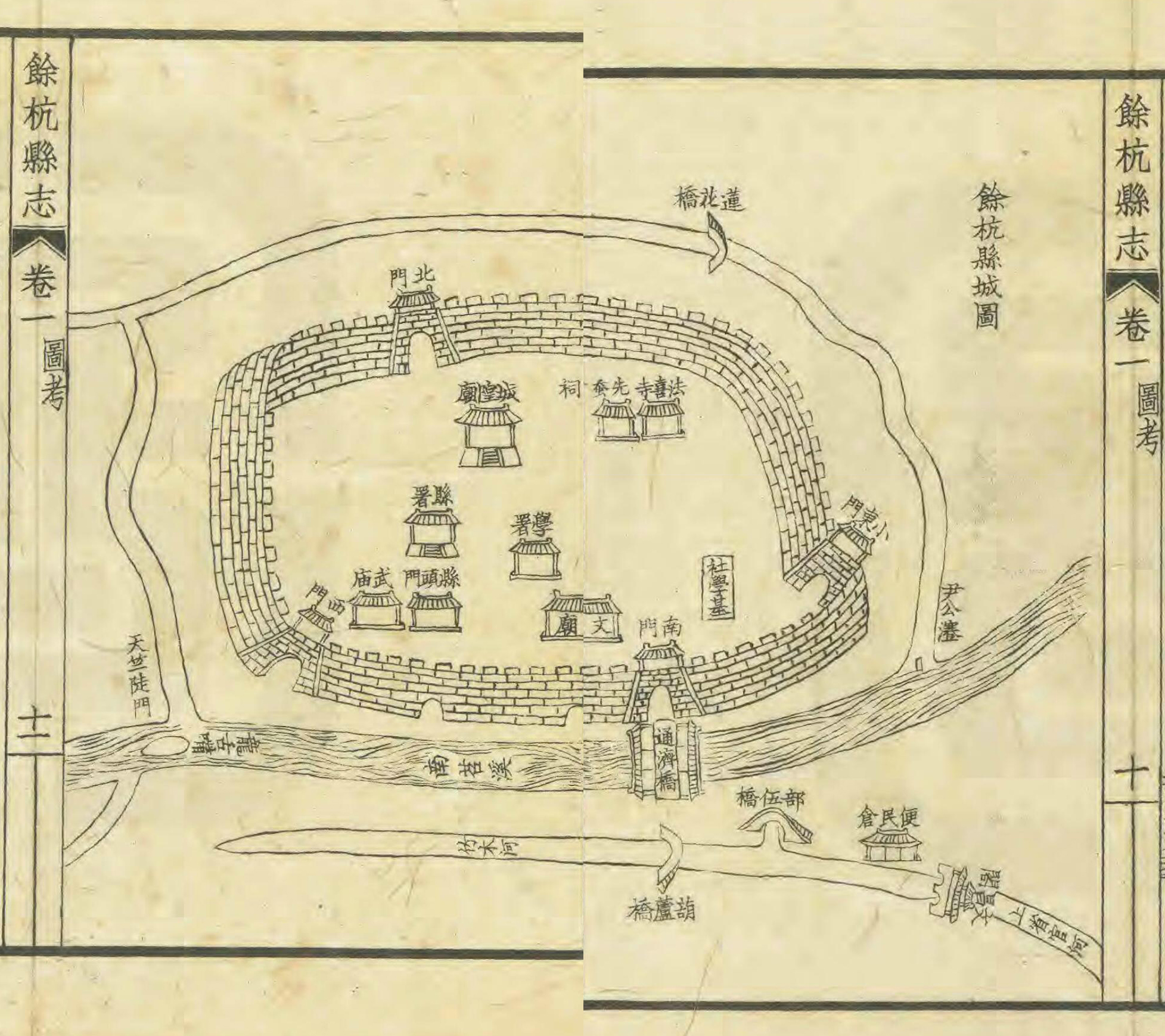
A map of Yuhang in 1808, showing the Yuhang-Hangzhou canal outside the town wall of Yuhang

Three days after the death, Ge's body started to decompose with thin blood found from the mouth and nose. Ge's mother and his foster-mother both believed Ge was poisoned to death. Although Little Cabbage denied killing her husband, Madam Shen filed a lawsuit for the uncertain death in the early hours on 30 November. On the same day, magistrate of Yuhang Liu Xitong (劉錫彤), in office for a month,^{:82} was told by his friend Chen Hu (陳湖) of the troubled marriage and that Little Cabbage lived with Yang as rumours suggested. The neighbours concluded that it is likely the disloyal wife killed Ge. Liu ordered an autopsy later that noon. Coroner Shen Xiang (沈詳) misidentified the thin blood as serious bleeding from seven openings (i.e., nostrils, mouth, ear canals, and nasolacrimal ducts) and the gray nails as abnormality in the corpse. He also forgot to wipe the needle and concluded wrongly that the black remains on it was as a result of poison consumption, which was in fact from the decayed body. (Note: In Collected Cases of Injustice Rectified, arsenic poisoning would result in black spots across the body and on the fingernails. Bones in dead body would also turn black even after long period of decaying.) Shen believed Ge died after having opium that made his body flaccid. Doorkeeper of Liu's house Shen Caicun (沈彩泉) contradicted Shen and said Ge died of arsenic by the look of bubbles in the stomach, adding that opium is normally for suicidal use only. In the end the postmortem report played ambiguous and stated the death by poisons without specifying any.

Madam Ge was brought before the magistrate and repeated her innocence until she was tortured. Knowing that the drug test was unquestionable, she was forced to fabricate her adultery with Yang and that she gave Yang arsenic on 24 November to murder Ge. Yang denied the testimony when summoned for cross-examination. As a juren, Yang was exempt from torture. Liu decided the evidence was strong and, on the next day, wrote to the imperial court to strip Yang of his juren's status, which was approved by Tongzhi Emperor on 9 December. The emperor also ordered the case to be tried in the provincial capital of Hangzhou. Meanwhile, Yang's relatives dissented the verdict on the grounds that Yang was at his wife's house on 24 November. Mrs. Ge chose not to reveal the truth, fearing the repercussions, and Yang remained defiance.

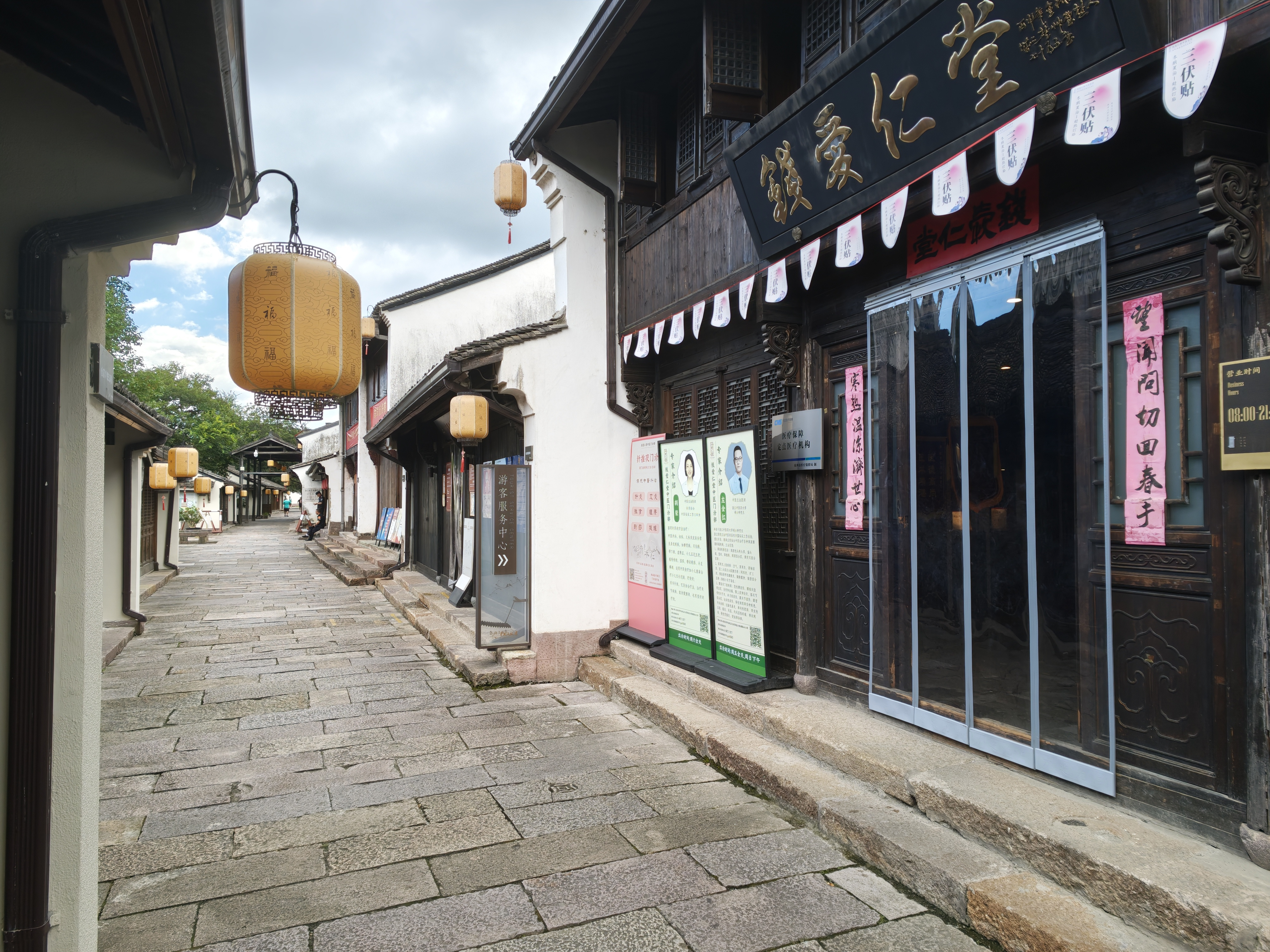
Airentang in 2025

When the case was tried by Chen Lu (陳魯), governor of Hangzhou prefecture, Yang was tortured and forced to admit guilt, claiming to have bought 40 wen worth of arsenic from Qian Baoshen (錢寶生)'s Airentang (愛仁堂) drug store on 22 November to kill rats, then gave them to Mrs. Ge. Chen therefore ordered Liu on 16 December to summon Qian. In fact there was no such person of "Qian Baoshen", and the owner Qian Tan (錢坦) was eventually, albeit reluctantly, persuaded by Chen Hu and Zhang Jun (章濬), a fellow countryman and son of linguist Zhang Binglin, into posing as Qian Baoshen and agreeing with the case on the defense that he had no knowledge of the murder plot. Qian was not cross-examined with Yang as Liu tried to avoid the blame of potentially delaying the investigation. (Note: Founded in the Xianfeng era, Airentang was a notable drugstore in Cangqian. Qian Tan, the founder, was accomplished for his philanthropic work and helpfulness.^{:44-46} It is believed that Yang Naiwu passed by the store on his way to Hangzhou from Yuhang and therefore used it to fabricate his testimony.) Chen delivered the guilty verdict after Qian's admission was sent to Hangzhou.

As Madam Shen discovered her narrative differed from Ge's, she and Wang Xinpei (王心培), one of her distant relatives' cousin who watched the death of Ge, rewrote their testimonies based on daughter-in-law Little Cabbage's claim. The discrepancy between defendant's testimony and the postmortem report was found by Liu, who rewrote descriptions of thin blood with serious bleeding. The new version of events was accepted by Chen without prior review from the lower court, and he announced death penalty for both defendants: Ge would be executed by slicing to death and Yang by beheading. "Qian Baoshen" was sentenced to caning. The sentencing was upheld by Zhejiang's justice minister Kuai Hesun and governor Yang Changjun on 25 December, which Ge and Yang both consented.

== Initial appeals ==
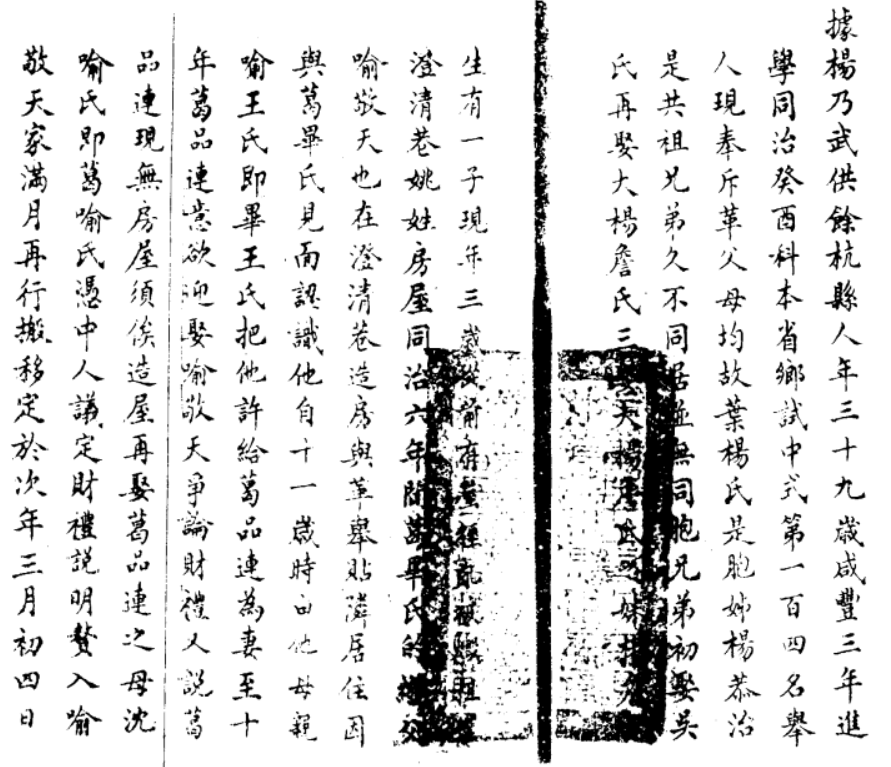
Confession of Yang submitted by Hu Ruilan

In around May 1874, Yang's sister Madam Ye appealed to the Censorate on behalf of Yang, who wrote in jail that he was framed up by Mrs. Ge and forced to plea guilty under judge's torture. The case was sent back to Zhejiang governor, who reverted it back to Chen for retrial. Chen intended to reject to appeal as both Yang and Ge had admitted guilt. Yang's remarried wife appealed to local justice ministry and governor's office in June and July but did not succeed. She proceeded to Nine Gates Infantry Commander in September for a second attempt of Appeal to Capital.

On the other hand, more joined in demanding justice as Yang family sought help from other prominent local gentry endorsed by Yang. One of those was Wang Shupin (汪樹屏), who coordinated 18 jurens and planned to approach the Censorate together to protect the reputation of Zhejiang scholars. Wang also wrote to his brother, who was working in the Censorate. Xia Tongshan, a junior minister of the court, introduced Yang's relatives to dozens of Zhejiang-born officials. Lin Gongshu (林拱樞), son of late Viceroy of Liangguang Lin Zexu, secretly retrieved the files for Weng Tonghe, who was told of the lawsuit by Xia, to further examine the case as Minister of Justice Sang Chunrong was about to report to the central court on rejecting the appeal and tried to prevent Lin from intervening. Weng found the suspicious statements by Yang and asked the ministry to probe. Relatives of Madam Ge in her maternal home were also said to have travelled to Peking and called for justice.^{:11-12, 38-39}

News of the case reached the emperor and two Empresses Dowager Ci'an and Ci'xi as Censorate and Nine Gates Infantry Commander received joint petition led by Yang and by Yang's wife.^{:11-12, 38-39} Ci'xi subsequently ordered a retrial. Governor Yang referred the case to two prefectural governors and two magistrates. The two death inmates retracted their confessions as they were not interrogated by tortures. Yang accused Liu's son Liu Chao (劉潮) of sending Yuan De (阮德), a police, to blackmail his family. He claimed another police officer He Chunfang (何春芳) had a close relationship with Mrs. Ge.^{:22-26,39-59,62-72}

In May 1875, Wang Shurui (王書瑞), a minister at the Ministry of Justice, said he suspected presiding local officials were deliberately delaying and muddling through the case such that the defendants could die in prison instead without much hassle. The imperial court then commissioned Hu Ruilan, minister for schools in Zhejiang, to reconsider the case along with four local officials. Hu recognised the differences between testimonies on when the arsenic was bought and the whereabouts of Yang on the day when Little Cabbage was beaten, but he did not investigate further; the same for the postmortem report. While Hu did find out the admissions were false, he decided not to overturn the conviction as Yang family had asked Qian and Madam Shen to retract his testimony and her sue, which Hu deemed was unfavourable to vindication.

== Final appeal ==
Two major English newspapers North China Daily News and Peking Gazette reported Hu's verdict. Diplomats were said to have assembled outside the Prime Minister's Office and criticised the judicial system.

Although the appeal was rejected, Bian Baoquan, an official at Ministry of Revenue, advised referring the case to the Ministry of Justice as there were significant changes to the merits of the case. Ci'xi initially rejected his application because directing local affairs to the ministry would be unprecedented, and only allowed the ministry to give advice to Hu. A team of officials led by Wang again requested the Censorate in around January 1876 to consider another re-trial on the basis of possible collusion between officials and the complicity of the case, while citing past local cases that the ministry was involved.^{:14} The Emperor Dowager subsequently changed her mind, which might have been motivated by the concerns that foreigners could leverage the injustice in this murder to force through negotiations of Chefoo Convention and of Qing's jurisdiction on Margary Affair. In February, the case was transferred to the Ministry of Justice by the Grand Council, which subsequently ordered all defendants and witnesses to travel to the capital. The ministry also found out officials in Zhejiang attempted to smear Yang family by accusing the family of bribing Airentang staff to testify against the magistrate and finding imposters for witnesses.^{:252}

Qian Tan died during the proceeding and Yang again withdrew his testimony. Investigators at the ministry discovered that the corner failed to clean the needle for autopsy, and thus Ge may not have died by poisons. The ministry further determined that Qian could have been misled and the testimony was not trustworthy, meaning that it is possible arsenic was not sold there. In January 1877, Ge's corpse was examined again at a Peking temple, where only whitish bones were found, confirming that Ge was not poisoned. The probe concluded that the decay of the body accelerated due to hot weather and was mistaken by the corner as death by poisoning. During questioning, Yang admitted framing up Liu Chao, Yuan De, and He Chunfang in order to be freed. The ministry established that "Qian Baoshen" has never existed after confirming with Qian's mother, and thus proving Yang's admission wrong.

On 30 March 1877, the Ministry of Justice reported to the emperor. An edict was issued on the same day.^{:108-109}

- Mrs. Ge, defendant, was sentenced to 80 canings for infidelity;
- Yang Naiwu, defendant, was sentenced to 100 canings and juren's status was not restored for infidelity and perjury. The ministry noted a lenient sentencing was handed as the false accusations were made to fight the case
- Mrs. Shen, claimant, was sentenced to 4 years in jail and 100 canings for perjury. The ministry acknowledged her desire to seek revenge and thus handed a lenient sentencing
- Wang Xinpei, relatives of the claimant, and Shen Tiren (沈體仁), stepfather of Ge Bilian, was sentenced to 80 canings for making false statements in conspiracy with Shen
- Wang Lin (王林), constable, was sentenced to 80 canings for making false statements in conspiracy with Shen
- Liu Xitong, sacked magistrate of Yuhang, was banished to Heilongjiang without possibility of avoiding sentencing by payment for rash admission of Shen Xiang's evidence, forging evidence, and fabricating merits of case with Zhang Jun (章濬)
- Shen Xiang, coroner of Yuhang, was sentenced to 2 years in jail, 80 canings, and demoted for four ranks for inaccurate autopsy
- Shen Caicun, doorkeeper of Liu Xitong, was sentenced to 100 canings and banished to 2,000 miles away for reckless argument with the coroner
- Zhang Jun, junior official for schools in Yuhang, was sentenced to 80 canings and sacked for encouraging Qian of perjury
- Chen Lu, governor of Hangzhou, and five other prefectural governors and magistrates involved in trials and re-trials, were sacked for miscarriages of injustice by rash conviction without evidence
- Yang Changjun, governor of Zhejiang, was sacked for failing to correct unjust convictions in various appeals
- Hui Ruilan, minister for schools in Zhejiang, was sacked for rash rejection of appeal without considering discrepancies in testimonies and failing the imperial edict
- Two household servants, were sentenced to 40 whippings for nosy involvement in the case (Note: The two servants gave Mrs. Shen a note that lists out address of two ministers. This was susceptible to interference when in fact it was for Mrs. Shen to find them for loan in order to return from Peking.)

Qian Tan, whose perjury resulted in the wrongful conviction, and Chen Hu, who encourage Qian to do so, died in prison. In the last hours Qian resigned to the reality that he was dragged into this legal saga despite abided to law throughout his whole life. Kuai Hesun, a member of the judging panel that rejected the appeal, died in 1875 before the final verdict was promulgated.

== Analysis ==
There had long been rumours that this wrongful conviction first began as a cover-up by Liu, whose son shifted blame to someone innocent. This was endorsed by Chinese scholar Huang Jun. He commented on the devolution of power by the court in the chaotic late Qing, leading to dictatorships at local level and even deceiving the imperial palace. It was only after the riots had calmed down did the central government took back control from the locals in the name of vindication. Huang said the removal of several ministers was a demonstration of reaffirming the authority.^{:165-183}

It was also claimed that Liu had a strained relationship with Yang since they first met when Liu was about to take office as magistrate. Yang's boatman was furious that his boat nearly clashed with Liu's on a canal in Yuhang. When Yang passed the exam became a juren, he did not follow past practices and visit the magistrate, demonstrating the uneasiness between the two.^{:46-48}

Researcher at First Historical Archives of China Niu Chuangpin (牛創平) analysed the case in 1992 and concluded the injustice was mainly caused by perfunctory misconducts, from the careless autopsy and perjury by Liu, to not verifying Qian's statements by Chen Lu and rejection of appeal by Hu Ruilan despite disapproving previous narrative of events. Niu rejected various theories, such as conflicts between the central court and Zhejiang local overlords, or between Zhejiang-born imperial ministers and local officials of their homeland.

Other legal scholars pointed out the irrationalities in Qing's legal system, such as secret trials and overemphasis on oral testimonies. The lack of judicial knowledge by the presiding local officials, such as magistrate Liu in the first hearing, who were imposed with heavy responsibilities by the law demanded a quick end of cases by them. Lu Yongdi (陸永棣) further blamed eight-legged essay and cash-for-honours mechanisms for the unintelligence, which gave way to powerful locals to rule the state. Lu said the absence of oversight allowed officials to collude with one another and to exercise summary execution.^{:61-157}

In his 1984 book Of Arsenic and Old Laws: Looking Anew at Criminal Justice in Late Imperial China, American legal scholar William P. Alford thoroughly examined the murder with literature reviews and mentioned that "many Western scholars have found little to suggest that the Chinese populace viewed the formal criminal justice process as a means through which individual justice might be secured".

Jonathan Ocko, an American sinologist, largely contributed the widespread attention and the overturn of the wrongful conviction to journalists of Shen Bao, saying that the three-year-long investigative reports by a mere year-old newspaper successfully provoked public oversight. Shen Bao focused on Yang's prestigious academic background and the rumoured adultery, thereby catching readers' attention. Reasserting Yang's innocence after the second appeal, Shen Bao remained dedicated to the case after Hu was commissioned for another appeal and after the ministry took over, while being critical to the judicial proceeding and secret trials at the time and urged for reform. Ocko added that Shen Bao rose to fame as their reports were relatively objective and opinion pieces from various viewpoints were published.^{:222-232}

From a feminism perspective, scholar Liu Xuelian (劉學連) argued that the injustice of Little Cabbage was largely ignored, adding on to the lack of her rights to speak out against the injustice in a patriarchy. Liu believed male chauvinism was a factor that leads to her false conviction, given that even the court and Shen Bao tended to view her as an evil woman, and in turn created a deadlock which unable to free Yang without addressing Little Cabbage's issue. Her eventual release was tied to Yang, whose juren social status allowed him to gather enough financial resources and support that won the empathy from officials and media. The Zhejiang gentry was proven to be monumental in overturning the capital punishment.

== Aftermath ==
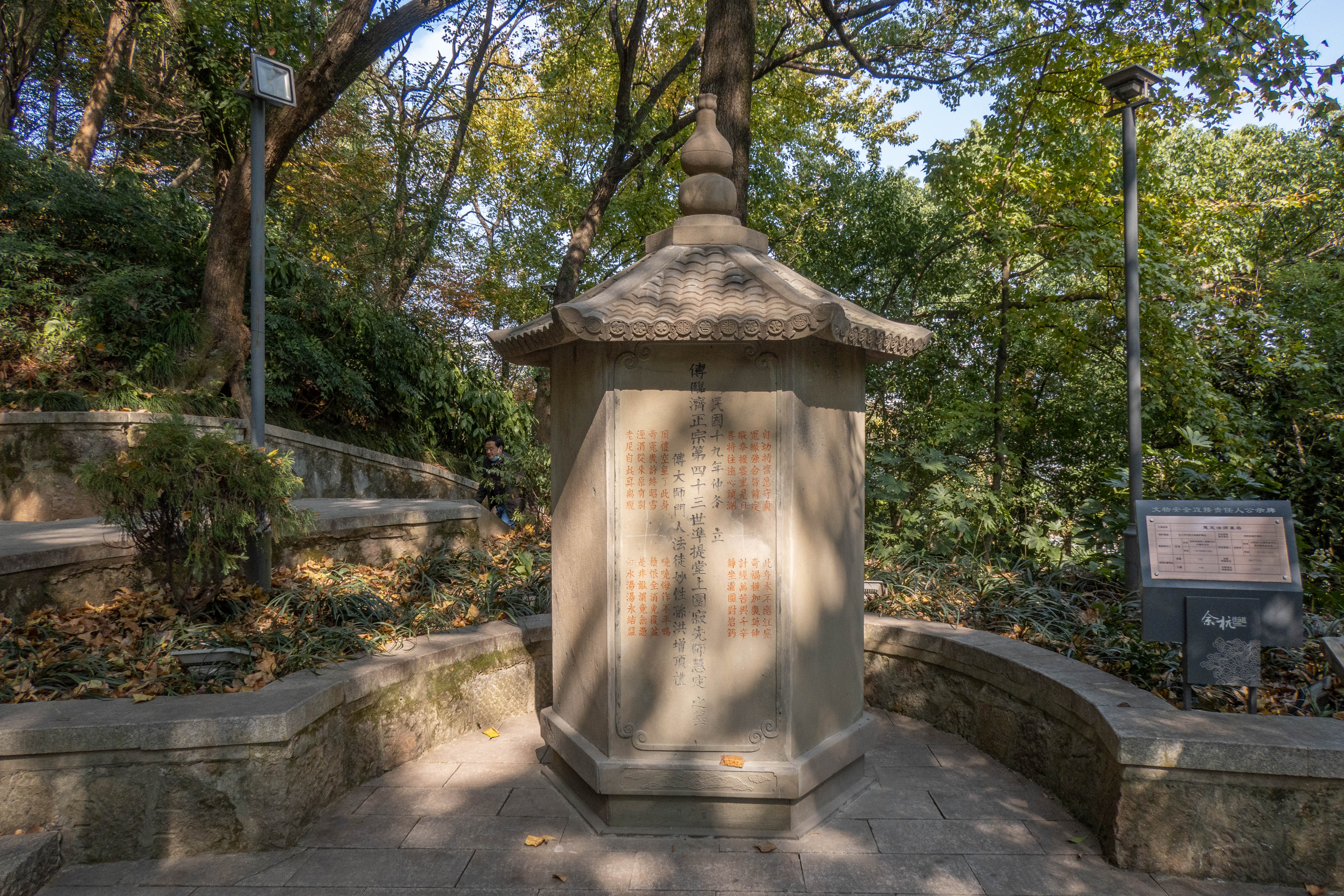
Tomb of Little Cabbage in Anleshan (安樂山) of Yuhang, rebuilt in 1985

According to his daughter and granddaughter, Yang became a silkworm farmer after his released and focused on academic works and educating his children until his death. Yang also felt guilty for having Qian's family drawn into this case, and had frequently dropped in during his business trips.^{:44-46} Yang Naiwu is believed to have died in 1914 likely from cellulitis and sepsis after he asked a surgeon to have his sore removed from his neck. His tomb in Yuhang was damaged during the Cultural Revolution, and was restored in 1991 when the tombstone was recovered.^{:28,31,35-37}

Madam Ge was teased and condemned when she returned to Yuhang. Not accepted by both families of Ge and Yang, she became a Buddhist nun, thereby attracting a crowd outside the monastery who was interested in her rumoured beauty. She was also said to have written a note that reaffirmed her and Yang's innocence. She died in 1930 and was buried at a park in Yuhang.^{:39-43}

Qian's stepmother never returned to Yuhang after her trip to Peking for imperial appeal. Qian Tan's brother named his son Wanjing (望京, lit. looking at the capital) to express hope that one day his mother would return home. Qian's family operated Airentang until the Three Socialist Transformations in 1956 that ended private ownership.^{:44-46}

== In popular culture ==
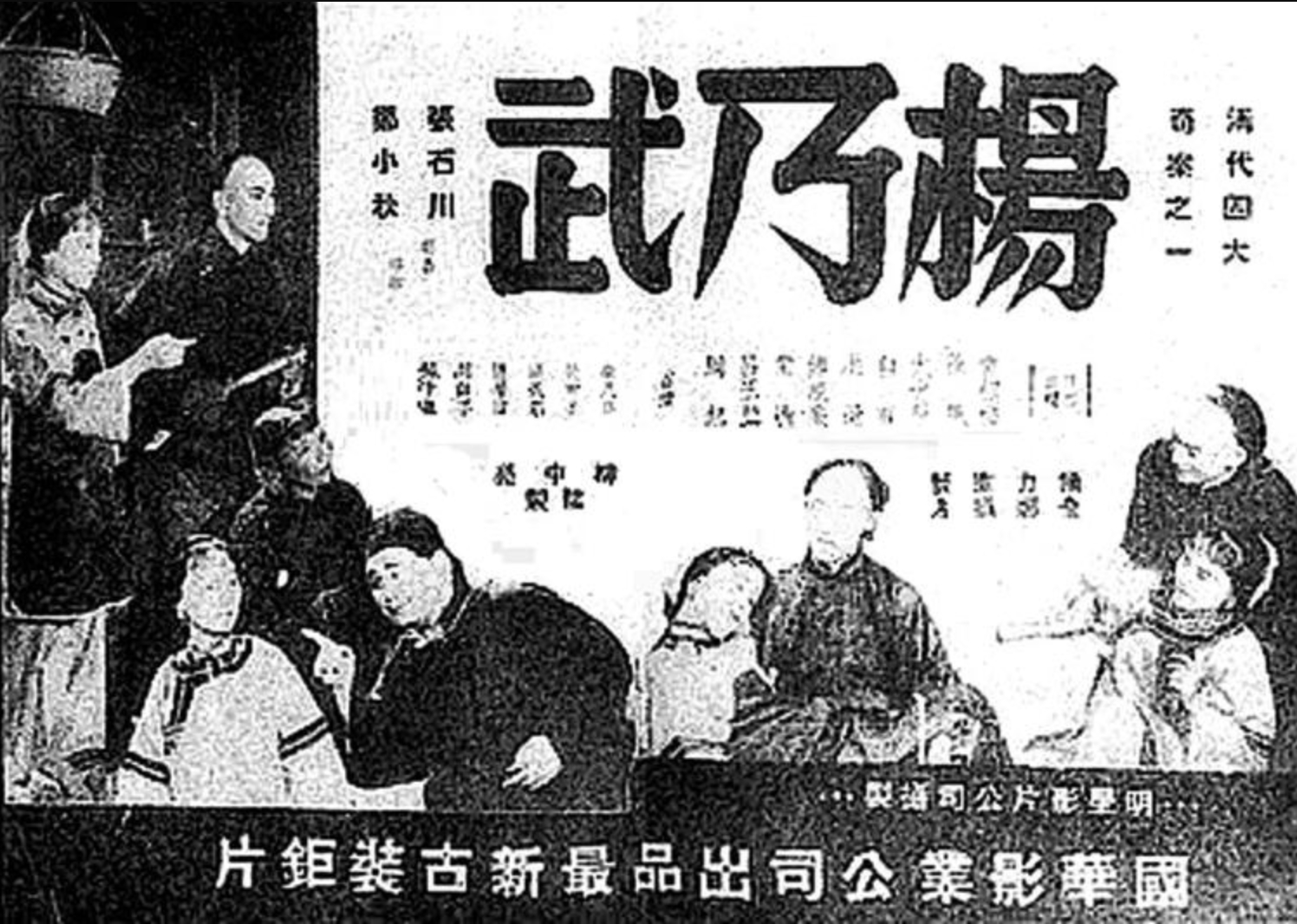
Advertisement of a 1930s movie based on this mistrial

Contemporary folklores claimed Little Cabbage had been a prostitute and exaggerated her unfaithfulness while Yang was a shameless lawyer. Romance literatures of Mandarin Ducks and Butterflies school also focused on the sexual stories between the two. These at-the-time fictions influenced later operas, movies, and television series later that base on this killing.^{:71-89}

In 1910s pingtan and Peking opera performances were made, followed by Shanghai opera in 1927, Ping opera in 1932, and Yue opera in 1938, catching a large crowd of audience. It was said that in 1912 Yang was furious over the invented plots and left without finish watching the opera in Shanghai.^{:90-94} First movie that readapts his trial was produced in 1929 in Shanghai and released next year, reportedly attracting full house in the new few days. During the Cultural Revolution all films related to Yang Naiwu and Little Cabbage were banned for praising the "feudal establishment". They only reappeared in stages after the reform and opening up in 1990s. In total there were over dozen of films and television series made in China, Hong Kong, and Taiwan, which include two 1994 films in Hong Kong: A Chinese Torture Chamber Story and Hail the Judge.
