= Lethal Weapons of Love and Passion =

Hong Kong television series

- Poster
- Genre: Wuxia
- Starring: Raymond Lam; Charmaine Sheh; Bosco Wong; Sonija Kwok; Sharon Chan
- Opening theme: Chut Chiu (出鞘) performed by Raymond Lam
- Ending theme: Ling Wui (領會) performed by Raymond Lam
- Country of origin: Hong Kong
- Original language: Cantonese
- No. of episodes: 40

Production
- Running time: 45 minutes per episode

Original release
- Network: TVB
- Release: January 5 – February 25, 2006

Lethal Weapons of Love and Passion
- Traditional Chinese: 覆雨翻雲
- Simplified Chinese: 覆雨翻云
Transcriptions
Standard Mandarin
- Hanyu Pinyin: Fù Yǔ Fān Yún
Yue: Cantonese
- Jyutping: Fuk1 Jyu5 Faan1 Wan4

Lethal Weapons of Love and Passion is a Hong Kong television series based on Huang Yi's novel Fuyu Fanyun. It was released overseas in December 2005 and broadcast on TVB in January 2006.

== Synopsis ==
The two sharpest weapons in the world,
The Rain-Ceasing Sword and the Cloud Ruling Sabre!
Carry the burdens of ethnic conflicts.

Pong Ban (Derek Kok) mercilessly defeated three monks who protected the Rain-Ceasing Sword. The surviving monk took the sword and fled when Long Fan-Wan (David Chiang) arrives to stop Pong Ban. The monk then was later found by Hon Pak (Bosco Wong), who presented it to Yin Wong.

It is set during the early Ming Dynasty, after the overthrow of the Mongol Yuan Dynasty. Fung Heng-Lit (Raymond Lam), the Mongol prince, lost his childhood memories during a massacre by Emperor Zhu. Heng-Lit escaped the massacre and grew up in China, where he becomes the chief of a clan. Pong Ban tries, by all means, to regain Heng-Lit's childhood memory and groom him into being a prince, hoping that Heng-Lit may lead the Mongol rebels in a campaign to overthrow the Ming Dynasty. However, Heng-Lit has his own dream, in which the Mongols and the Han Chinese live together in harmony.

== Cast ==
Note: Some of the characters' names are in Cantonese romanisation.

Cast	Role	Description
Raymond Lam	Fung Heng-Lit 風行烈	Mongolian Prince; Chun Mung-Yiu's lover Hon pak's best friend Gan Bing-Wan's ex-husband
Charmaine Sheh	Chun Mung-Yiu 秦夢瑤	Fung Heng-Lit's lover
Bosco Wong	Hon Pak 韓柏	Hui Ye-Yuet's lover Fung Heng-Lit's best friend
Sonija Kwok	Gan Bing-Wan 靳冰雲	Pong Ban's lover Chun Mung-Yiu's senior Fung Heng-Lit's ex-wife
Sharon Chan	Hui Ye-Yuet 虛夜月	Hon Pak's lover
Derek Kok	Pong Ban 龐斑	Gan Bing-Wan's lover Loyal follower of Fung Heng-Lit; Mongolian cult leader
David Chiang	Long Fan-Wan 浪翻雲	Hon Pak's master
Makbau Mak (麥長青)	Chu Di 朱棣	4th Royal Prince, Later becomes Yongle Emperor
Power Chan	Fan Leung-Kik 范良極	Hon Pak's master Good friend of Chun Mung-Yiu
Gordon Liu	Lai Yue-hoi 厲若海	Fung Heng-Lit's master who dislike Mongolian
Benz Hui Shiu-hung	Hui Yuk Mo 虛若無	General of Ming Dynasty; Foster Father of Hui Ye-Yuet; Father of Hon Pak
Eddy Ko	Emperor Zhu 朱元璋	Emperor Zhu of Ming Dynasty

== Viewership ratings ==
	Week	Episode	Average Points	Peaking Points	References
1	January 5–6, 2006	1 — 2	24	—	
2	January 9–13, 2006	3 — 7	24	—	
3	January 16–20, 2006	8 — 12	25	—	
4	January 23–27, 2006	13 — 17	24	—	
5	January 30 - February 3, 2006	18 — 23	22	—	
6	February 6–10, 2006	24 — 28	24	—	
7	February 13–17, 2006	29 — 33	23	—	
8	February 20–24, 2006	34 — 38	24	—	
8	February 25, 2006	39 — 40	23	—	

== Awards and nominations ==
39th TVB Anniversary Awards (2006)

- "Best Drama"
