= Ancient Chinese Whorehouse =

1994 Hong Kong film by Kai Ming Lai

- Traditional Chinese: 青樓十二房
- Simplified Chinese: 青楼十二房
- Literal meaning: Twelve rooms of a brothel
- Hanyu Pinyin: Qīnglóu Shí'èr'fáng
- Directed by: Kai Ming Lai
- Written by: Man Fai Ng
- Produced by: Luo Shiquan; Cheng Chaoliang
- Starring: Yvonne Yung; Kent Cheng; Kingdom Yuen; Elvis Tsui; Cheng Xueyan; Liu Dizhi
- Cinematography: Pan Deye
- Edited by: Chen Qihe
- Music by: Mak Chun Hung
- Production companies: Jinli Manufacture Co., Ltd. Longxiang Industry Co., Ltd.
- Distributed by: New Generation Co., Ltd.
- Release date: 15 September 1994 (Hong Kong)
- Running time: 100 minutes
- Country: Hong Kong
- Languages: Mandarin; Cantonese
- Box office: HK $2,481,978.00

Ancient Chinese Whorehouse is a 1994 Hong Kong sex comedy film directed by Kai Ming Lai and written by Man Fai Ng, starring Yvonne Yung, Kent Cheng, Kingdom Yuen, Elvis Tsui, Cheng Xueyan, and Liu Dizhi. The film premiered in Hong Kong on 15 September 1994.

== Plot ==
A poor girl named A Qing was sold into the brothel Changle Fang (simplified Chinese: 尝乐坊; traditional Chinese: 嘗樂坊; lit. 'Taste of music') during the Tang dynasty. In the brothel was a man called Brother Gang, an inventor of sex toys who falls in love with the brothel owner, Wu Guniang, secretly. While A Qing slept with the visitor, she drank ecstasy and had sex with A Yi. Eventually, A Qing married A Yi and left the brothel.

== Cast ==
- Yvonne Yung as Wu Guniang, the brothel owner.
- Kent Cheng as Brother Gang, the inventor in the brothel.
- Kingdom Yuen as Sister Zhu, a prostitute.
- Elvis Tsui as the Royal Highness, a man with a warm temperament who was killed by Wu Guniang.
- Cheng Xueyan as A Qing, a poor girl who was sold into the brothel.
- Liu Dizhi as A Yi, Brother Gang's student who fells in love with A Qing.

== Release ==
The film was released in Hong Kong on 15 September 1994 and grossed a total of $2,481,978.
