= Yvonne Yung =

Hong Kong actress (born 1968)

- 翁虹
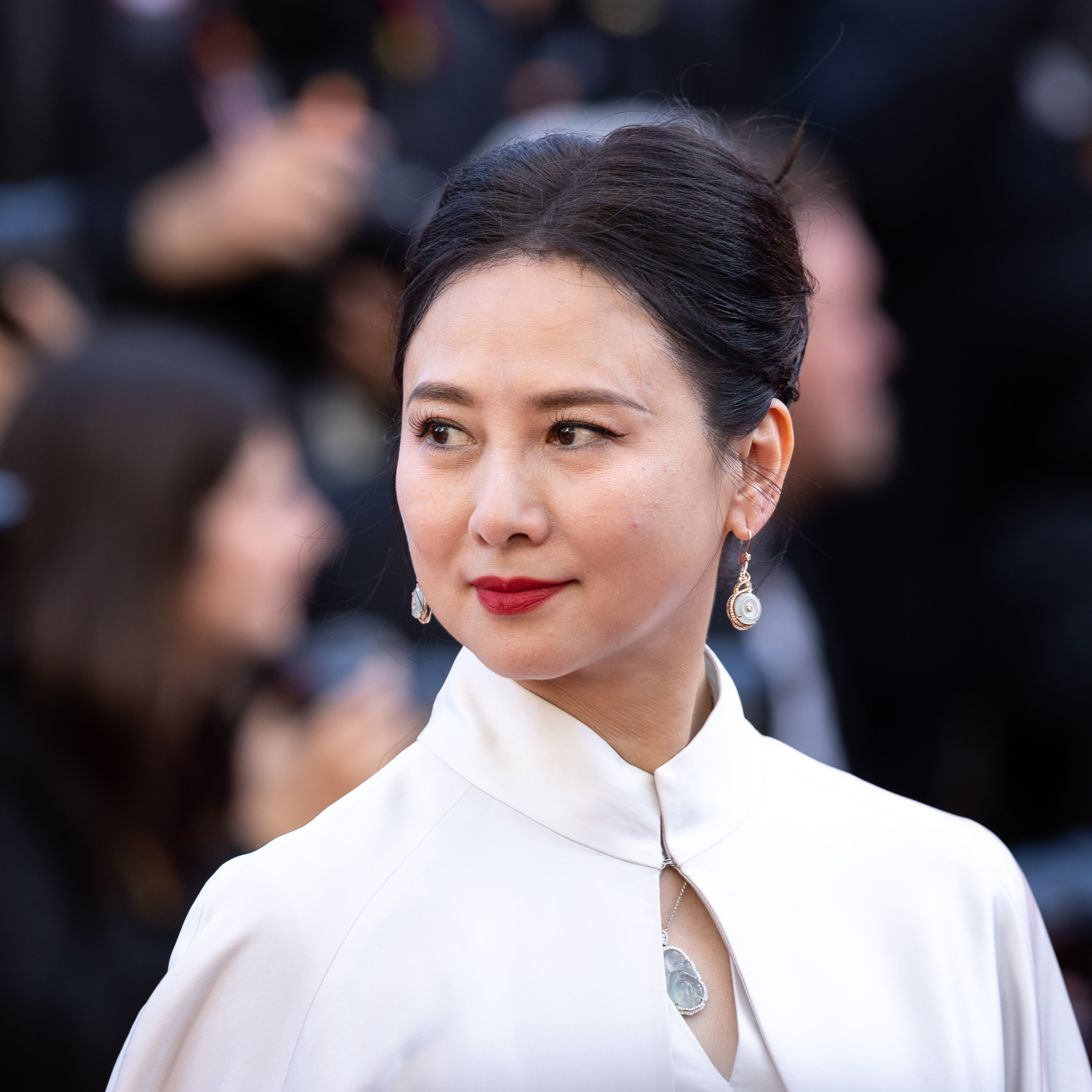
- Yung at the 2025 Cannes Film Festival
- Born: 17 September 1968 (age 58); Beijing, China
- Other names: Yung Hung; Yvonne Hung Yung
- Education: The Hong Kong Academy for Performing Arts
- Occupation: Actress
- Years active: 1989–present
- Spouses: Ng Wai-kit (m. 2003; div. 2005); Will Liu Lunhao (m. 2007)
- Children: 1

Chinese name
- Chinese: 翁虹
Transcriptions
Standard Mandarin
- Hanyu Pinyin: Wēng Hóng
Yue: Cantonese
- Jyutping: Yung1 Hung4

Yvonne Yung (born 17 September 1968) is a Chinese actress and beauty pageant titleholder.

== Early life ==
Yung was born on 17 September 1968 in Beijing. At age 12, Yung immigrated to Hong Kong.

== Career ==
Yung started her entertainment career as a model and dancer.

In 1989, Yung became the winner for Miss Asia Pageant (local pageant in Hong Kong). Yung was Hong Kong delegate for Miss World 1989 held in her country, but did not enter the top 10.

Yung was known for her acting performances in Category III films. Yung has appeared in A Chinese Torture Chamber Story, Ancient Chinese Whorehouse, Romance of the Vampires, Fake Pretty Woman, and many others.

In 2001, Yung retired from the film industry but still made appearances in television series.

== Personal life ==
In 2003, Yung married Ng Wai-kit (伍偉傑), the vice CEO of an American casino. Ying's marriage ended in divorce in 2005.

In January 2007, Yung married Will Liu Lunhao (劉倫浩), a professional gym operator, and gave birth to their daughter Crystal in October that year. In 2009, she and Liu were named spokespeople for the Chinese government's campaign to convince people to seek help for sexually transmitted diseases.

== Filmography ==
- 1989: The Iron Butterfly
- 1991: Dances with the Dragon—Diana Kung
- 1992: Freedom Run Q
- 1992: Temptation of the Spiritual World
- 1993: Don't Stop My Crazy Love For You
- 1993: Guns of Dragon
- 1993: My Pale Lover
- 1983: My Virgin
- 1993: Sexy Story
- 1994: Drunken Master II
- 1994: A Chinese Torture Chamber Story—Siu-bak-choi (Little Cabbage)
- 1994: Ancient Chinese Whorehouse—Wu Gu'niang
- 1984: The Power of Money
- 1984: Romance of the Vampires
- 1994: Sex and the Emperor
- 1994: Bloody Brothers
- 1994: Fatal Obsession
- 1994: The Tragic Fantasy - Tiger of Wanchai
- 1994: The Wild Lover
- 1995: Black Dream
- 1995: A Fake Pretty Woman
- 1985: Spike Drink Gang
- 1995: Lover of the Last Empress
- 1996: Hero of Swallow
- 1997: The Jail in Burning Island
- 1997: Walk In
- 1998: Exodus from Afar
- 1998: Nightmare Zone
- 1999: Undercover Girls
- 2001: Yvonne Yung: Fantastic Dream Japanese Vacation (pictorial videos)
- 2002: Freaky Story
- 2003: The Murderer Is My Wife
- 2003: Return of Devil
- 2004: Twin of Brothers
- 2006: The Great Dunhuang
- 2012: Tales of Two Cities
- 2012: All for Love
- 2013: Born to Love You
- 2014: Fighting
- 2014: Town of the Dragon
- 2014: Give Seven Days
- 2016: Like Life
- 2017: I Love My President Though He's a Psycho
- 2019: Hello Love
- 2022: Side Story of Volant Fox
