= The Master of Tai Chi (TV series) =

Hong Kong television series

- Official poster
- 太極
- Genre: Period drama Martial arts
- Written by: Au Koon-ying; Lee Yee-wah
- Directed by: Raymond Chai
- Starring: Vincent Zhao; Raymond Lam; Myolie Wu; Kenneth Ma; Melissa Ng; Paul Chun; David Chiang; Derek Kok; Selena Li
- Opening theme: Tai Chi (太極)
- Ending theme: Fau Sang Yeuk Sui (浮生若水) by Raymond Lam
- Composers: Tang Chi-wai; Tam Tin-lok
- Country of origin: Hong Kong
- Original language: Cantonese
- No. of episodes: 25

Production
- Executive producers: Tommy Leung; Raymond Chai
- Production locations: Hong Kong; Jianshui County, Yunnan; Kunming, Yunnan; Shanghai
- Camera setup: Multi camera
- Running time: 45 minutes (each)
- Production company: TVB

Original release
- Network: Jade
- Release: 25 February – 28 March 2008

The Master of Tai Chi
- title card
- Traditional Chinese: 太極
- Simplified Chinese: 太极
- Literal meaning: "Tai Chi"
Transcriptions
Standard Mandarin
- Hanyu Pinyin: Tài Jí
Yue: Cantonese
- Jyutping: Taai3 Gik6

The Master of Tai Chi (Traditional Chinese: 太極) is a Hong Kong martial arts television drama that aired on Jade and HD Jade from 25 February to 28 March 2008. Produced by Tommy Leung and Raymond Chai, The Master of Tai Chi is a TVB production. The drama was filmed in early 2006, and is the station's first high-definition series that was ever produced.

This is TVB's custom-made series for kung-fu icon Vincent Zhao. At the request of Zhao, the main character's name has been changed from 'Wen Zhiu' to 'Mo Ma'.

== Synopsis ==
It demonstrates the philosophy of the way,
It shows the path to wisdom and harmony,
A master is here to teach the essence of tai chi!

Orphaned as a child, Mo Ma (Vincent Zhao) grew up in the country and started learning tai chi from his mentor at a very young age. The devastating experience of being abandoned by his mother and eventually his mentor as well has left him twisted and full of hatred. After a series of events that leads to his house being burnt down in the village, his best friend Mai Fung-Nin (Kenneth Ma) and him joins the army. After yet another series of events, they saved Yin Chi-Kwai (Myolie Wu) and Yin Chui-Kiu (Selena Li) and travelled to the capital together. In the capital, another series of events leads Mo Ma to be reunited to his mentor and he starts learning tai chi from his mentor seriously.

Throughout the series, Mo Ma and his friends will experience many injustice that is planned by the Mayor's Assistant and the Head Police Officer aided by Lui Yau-Ngo (Derek Kok). The relationships of each character in the series will change and evolve as well especially between Mou Ma and Song Ching (Melissa Ng), Mai Fung-Nin and Yin Chui-Kiu and lastly between Yin Chi-Kwai and Tuen Hiu-Sing (Raymond Lam), Mo Ma's rival.

== Cast ==
Cast	Role	Description
Vincent Zhao	Mo Ma 巫馬	Kwan San-Yuet's student.
Raymond Lam	Tuen Hiu-Sing 段曉星	Chong Lung Pai (蒼龍派) Head Master; Yin Chi-Kwai's lover. Mo Ma's rival.
Myolie Wu	Yin Chi-Kwai 言子規	Yin Chui-Kiu's sister. Tuen Hiu-Sing's lover.
Kenneth Ma	Mai Fung-Nin 米豐年	Restaurant Owner; Mo Ma's best friend. Yin Chiu-Kiu's husband.
Melissa Ng	Song Ching 桑青	Mai Fung-Lin's fiance. Mo Ma's love interest
Selena Li	Yin Chui-Kiu 言翠翹	Yin Chi-Kwai's sister. Mai Fung-Lin's wife.
Paul Chun	Tuen Tai-Bak 段泰北	Chong Lung Pai (蒼龍派) Ex-Head Master; Tuen Hiu-Sing's father.
Lau Siu Ming (劉兆銘)	Kwan San-Yuet 關山越	Mo Ma's mentor.
Power Chan	Ma Keung 麻強	Chong Lung Pai (蒼龍派) Eldest Student
Derek Kok	Lui Yau-Ngo 閭丘傲	
Yoyo Chen (陳自瑤)	So Hung-Ling 蘇紅菱	Lui Yau-Ngo's lover.
David Chiang	Mo Jik 巫直	Mo Ma's father.
Ellesmere Choy (蔡子健)	Chai Kei Hak-Yeung 柴崎克洋	Tuen Hiu-Sing's best friend/classmate.
Wilson Tsui (艾威)	Chai Wai 柴威	Head Police Officer

== Viewership ratings ==
	Week	Episode	Average Points	Peaking Points	References
1	February 25–29, 2008	1 — 5	28	30	
2	March 3–7, 2008	6 — 10	28	30	
3	March 10–14, 2008	11 — 15	28	—	
4	March 17–21, 2008	16 — 20	27	—	
5	March 24–28, 2008	21 — 25	29	31	

== Awards and nominations ==
41st TVB Anniversary Awards (2008)

- "Best Drama"
- "Best Actor in a Supporting Role" (Kenneth Ma - Mai Fung-Nin)
