= A Chinese Torture Chamber Story =

1994 Hong Kong erotic black comedy film

- Film poster
- Traditional Chinese: 滿清十大酷刑
- Simplified Chinese: 满清十大酷刑
- Literal meaning: Ten Tortures of the Manchu Qing
- Hanyu Pinyin: Mǎn Qīng shí dà kùxíng
- Jyutping: Mun5 Cing1 sap6 daai6 huk6 jing4
- Directed by: Bosco Lam
- Written by: Cheuk Bing; Chui Dat-choh
- Produced by: Wong Jing
- Starring: Yvonne Yung; Lawrence Ng
- Cinematography: Tony Miu
- Edited by: Chan Gan-shing
- Music by: Lee Hon-kam; Marco Wan
- Production company: Wong Jing's Workshop Ltd.
- Distributed by: Gala Film Distribution Limited
- Release date: 19 May 1994
- Running time: 92 minutes
- Country: Hong Kong
- Language: Cantonese
- Box office: HK$10,404,725

A Chinese Torture Chamber Story is a 1994 Hong Kong erotic (Category III) black comedy film produced by Wong Jing and directed by Bosco Lam. The story is a modification of the case of Yang Naiwu and Little Cabbage.

== Plot ==
The tragic death of butcher Ge Xiaoda cast suspicion on his wife, Xiao Baicai, who was alleged to have an improper relationship with Yang Naiwu (played by Wu Qihua). This relationship was suspected to be part of a conspiracy to kill Ge Xiaoda. Governor Liu Xitong (played by Lu Xiong) took on the case.

One night, a neighbor discovered Ge Xiaoda dead and covered in blood. Xiao Baicai was brought to trial, accused of adultery with Yang Naiwu and conspiring to murder her husband. Yang Naiwu, a Juren, could not be tortured due to his status, so he was imprisoned instead. Under Governor Liu's torture, Xiao Baicai revealed her history with Yang Naiwu.

Yang Naiwu fell in love with Xiao Baicai while collecting rent from her parents, who were his tenants. He arranged for Xiao Baicai to help with housekeeping, hoping to take her as a concubine. They developed feelings for each other but did not act on them due to the master-servant relationship and Yang's wife. After Xiao Baicai's parents died, Yang comforted her, and although they had physical contact, they held back due to her mourning period. Xiao Baicai vowed to marry Yang after mourning.

However, Xiao Baicai caught Yang's wife in an affair with Liu Haisheng, Governor Liu's son. Fearing exposure, Yang's wife forced Xiao Baicai to marry Ge Xiaoda, a notorious butcher. Xiao Baicai's attempt to escape failed, leading to her forced marriage.

== Cast ==
- Yvonne Yung as Siu-bak-choi (Little Cabbage)
- Lawrence Ng as Yeung Nai-mou
- Tommy Wong as Gok Siu-dai
- Ching Mai as Jane, Yeung's Wife
- Oh Yin-hei as Yeung's Sister
- Kenny Wong as Lau Hoi-sing
- Elvis Tsui as Win Chung-lung
- Kingdom Yuen as Nanny
- Julie Lee as Ki Dan-fung
- Lo Hung as Judge Lau, Hoi Sing's Father
- Lee Siu-kei as Judge of Supreme Court
- Liu Fan as Prison Guard
- Dave Lam as Court Assistant
- Leung Sai-on
- Leung Kei-hei
- Aman Chang
