= Town of the Dragon =

- Directed by: Xue Cun
- Production companies: Phoenix Media Co., Ltd; Beijing Heirloom Entertainment Co., Ltd
- Release date: October 17, 2014
- Running time: 83 minutes
- Country: China
- Language: Mandarin
- Box office: ¥0.23 million (China)

Town of the Dragon (Chinese: 卧龙岗) is a 2014 Chinese suspense comedy film directed by Xue Cun. It was released on October 17.

== Cast ==
- Xue Cun
- Yu Qing
- Ying Da
- Yvonne Yung
- Lam Suet
- Zhu Jie
- Qin Xueshi
- Li Bin
- Miao Haizhong
- Niu Mengmeng

== Reception ==
By October 20, the film had earned ¥0.23 million at the Chinese box office.
