= Raymond Lam =

Chinese actor and singer

- 林峯
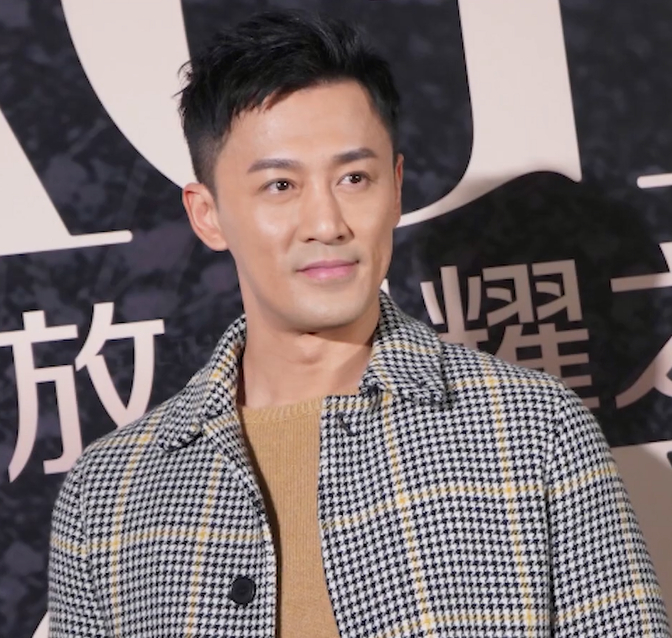
- Lam in 2020
- Born: Lin Hui Wen (林匯文); 8 December 1979 (age 46); Xiamen, Fujian, China
- Education: Xiamen University; University of Southern California
- Occupations: Actor; Singer
- Years active: 1999–present
- Spouse: Carina Zhang (m. 2019)
- Children: 1
- Father: Lam Kwok-Wah
- Musical career
- Also known as: Lam Yat Fung (林逸峯), Chok (王), Soft Wind
- Origin: Hong Kong
- Genres: Cantopop; R&B
- Labels: Emperor Entertainment Group (2007–17); Voice Entertainment (2019–2020); Warner Music Group (2021-Present)

Chinese name
- Traditional Chinese: 林峯
- Simplified Chinese: 林峯
Transcriptions
Yue: Cantonese
- Yale Romanization: Làm Fūng
- Jyutping: Lam4 Fung1
Southern Min
- Hokkien POJ: Lîm-hong

Raymond Lam (Chinese: 林峯; Pe̍h-ōe-jī: Lîm-hong; Jyutping: lam4 fung1; born 8 December 1979) is a Hong Kong actor and singer who is best known for roles in the television dramas A Step into the Past, Twin of Brothers, Moonlight Resonance, Highs and Lows and Line Walker and was dubbed the King of Chok after his role in The Mysteries of Love.

== Early years ==
Raymond Lam was born in Xiamen, China, on 8 December 1979, but moved to Hong Kong at the age of 2. His father, Lam Kwok-Wah (林國華), is a real-estate property developer in the mainland referred to as "Xiamen's Li Ka-shing" (廈門李嘉誠; Pe̍h-ōe-jī: Ē-mn̂g Lí Ka-sêng) who sits on the board of seven real estate and construction companies.

While his first languages are Cantonese and Hokkien, Lam studied in Kiangsu and Chekiang Primary School, a primarily Mandarin-speaking primary school in pre-Handover Hong Kong and is thus also fluent in Mandarin and English. Raymond Lam's childhood dream was to become a professional singer and dancer. He studied in St. Paul's College, Hong Kong for Secondary School. Following that, he studied architecture in Xiamen University for 1st Year, and then completed the rest at University of Southern California, majoring in architecture and minoring in music.

== Career ==
=== Success in Hong Kong ===
Lam attended the 13th TVB artists training class in 1998 as an auditing student and was offered a contract with TVB upon graduation in September 1998. In the earlier part of his career, Lam appeared as a walk-on in numerous television series and as a host for TVB8.

Lam rose to fame for his portrayal of the ruthless Qin Shi Huang in the historical/science fiction drama A Step into the Past (2001). He was then offered his first lead role in Eternal Happiness (2002). In 2003, Lam won the TVB Anniversary Award for "Most Improved Male Artiste" for his performance in the legal drama, Survivor's Law.

In 2004, Lam gained fame in China for his role as Kou Chong in Twin of Brothers, and won several awards.

After a one-year hiatus in 2005 due to inner conflicts in TVB, Lam made his comeback in La Femme Desperado (2006), which became the highest rated drama of the year.

In 2007, Lam was cast in The Drive of Life, a grand production by TVB to commemorate the 10th anniversary of Hong Kong reunification.

The following year, Lam returned to star in the Moonlight Resonance, the sequel to Heart of Greed. The series was met with critical acclaim, and subsequently became the highest rated Hong Kong drama since 1991.

Also in 2008, Lam starred in the wuxia drama The Four. His portrayal of the character "Wu Qing" was met with critical acclaim from fans of the original novel by Woon Swee Oan. This was followed by a starring role in the martial arts series The Master of Tai Chi, for which he won "Best Actor" at the Asian Television Awards.

In 2010, Lam starred in The Mysteries of Love, where he portrayed a genius physics professor. Lam's portrayal of a professor was described by audience using the slang word "Chok", which means "cool or handsome, to the point of electrifying". Lam stated that he thinks the word means "professional/serious" instead. Subsequently, the term went viral and Lam was named as the "King of Chok". The same year, Lam also made his foray into films, starring in Perfect Wedding with Miriam Yeung and The Jade and the Pearl with Charlene Choi.

=== Breaking into China ===
In 2011, Lam starred in the Chinese film The Sorcerer and the White Snake, portraying Xu Xian. The film was one of the top 5 grossing Chinese films of the year, and Lam was ranked on Forbes China Celebrity List for the first time.

In 2012, Lam played a policeman for the first time in Highs and Lows. High and Lows was the most watched Hong Kong drama in China that year, and Lam won "Best Actor" at the Huading Awards. The same year, Lam starred in the comedy film, Love Is...Pyjamas. The same year, he took on the role of Zhuge Liang in the time-travel historical drama, Three Kingdoms RPG.

In 2013, Lam starred in Saving General Yang, portraying the fifth son Yang Yande. He also headlined the horror film, Baby Blues. On the small screen, he starred in historical drama, Loved in the Purple.

In 2014, he portrayed Han Wudi in the drama The Virtuous Queen of Han, which won him the "Top 10 Most Popular Actor" award at the 9th Chinese TV Audience Festival. He also starred in the hit Hong Kong drama, Line Walker. His character Sit Ka-keung "Bao Seed" was praised by critics for being the "soul/essence" of the drama. His onscreen partnership with Charmaine Sheh was also favoured by viewers. He became a stronger contender for "Best Actor" award in 2014 TVB Anniversary Awards. Lam won the "Best Actor" award at the 15th Huading Awards for his performance in both dramas.

In 2015, Lam portrayed Lu Xiaofeng in the wuxia drama, Detectives and Doctors. He is the fourth Chinese actor to portray the character, and was praised by critics for being the most outstanding Lu Xiaofeng.

In 2016, Lam starred in the wuxia drama, Six Doors, acting as a constable detective. In 2017, Lam starred in the palace drama, Rule The World, playing Huang Taiji.

In 2018, Lam is set to star in The Legends of Monkey King, playing the titular Sun Wukong. He was also cast in the police procedural drama, Police Tactical Unit.

In 2021, Lam starred as the main lead in Female-centered business drama, Star of Ocean.

=== Return to TVB ===
In 2018, Lam signed with Louis Koo's management agency Sky High Entertainment.

In 2019, Raymond Lam announced he would be working with TVB and The Voice Entertainment Group during the press conference of TVB Homecoming on 17 March 2019.

In 2020, Lam reprised his role as "Bao Seed" Sit Ka-keung in Line Walker: Bull Fight.

== Music ==
Apart from his acting career, Lam also performed some of the theme songs for the television series he acted in. In 2007, Lam signed on with EEG under its Music Plus Label, and released his debut album, Finding Love in Memories, on 23 November. The title track of the album served as one of the theme songs for TVB's The Drive of Life.

On 10 September 2008, Lam released his second album Your Love. The album secured a double IFPI Platinum Award. A song from the album, Love With No Regrets, became the theme song of Moonlight Resonance, and won many awards including the Gold Song award at the Top Ten Chinese Gold Songs Award and Jade Solid Gold Awards Presentation.

In 2009, Lam released his third album Let's Get Wet and stepped on the Hong Kong Coliseum for his first concert, held on 17 and 18 June.

On 17 July 2010, Lam released his fourth album Come 2 Me.

On 4 March 2011, Lam released his first Mandarin album First. On 22 July 2011, Lam released his sixth album LF, which includes the hit single "CHOK". The same year, Lam held his third concert, Light Up My Live, which was also his first world tour.

In 2012, Lam continued his Light up my Live World Tour at other countries such as Macau and several cities in America. On 17 August 2012, Lam released his seventh album Self-Portrait.

On 26 January 2013, Lam held his fourth concert and world tour, A Time 4 You, with his eighth album of the same name released one day before the concert.

In 2016, Lam released his ninth album, Trap. From 29 April until 1 May 2016, Lam held his fifth concert, Heart Attack LF Live In HK.

Lam left EEG in 2017 after contract expired.

Lam has signed with TVB’s record label, Voice Entertainment on 17 March 2019. Also, in 2020 will be Lam’s 20th debut anniversary, and he plans on doing a concert tour to commemorate it

On 20 May 2021, Weibo Starlight Awards 2020 ceremony was held online. The winners were all over the world, including Lam, Louis Koo, Takuya Kimura and his two daughters, Katy Perry, Taylor Swift, etc.

In 2021, Lam has signed with Warner Music.

In 2022, Lam joined the cast of reality tv show Call Me by Fire (season 2) as a contestant.

== Personal life ==
Lam married Carina Zhang, a Chinese model, in December 2019. They had a daughter in September 2020.

== Filmography ==
=== Film ===
Year	Title	Role	Notes/Ref.
2001	Stolen Love	Rick Kwok	
2008	Storm Rider Clash of the Evils	Striding Cloud	Voice-dubbed
2009	Pleasant Goat and Big Big Wolf	Xi Yangyang	Voice-dubbed
2010	72 Tenants of Prosperity	young Shek Kin	
2010	The Jade and the Pearl	General Ching Hin	
2010	Perfect Wedding	Ling Yu-fung	
2011	The Sorcerer and the White Snake	Xu Xian	
2011	I Love Hong Kong	Electrical shopkeeper	
2012	Love Is...Pyjamas	Owen	
2012	Give Me 1 Minute to Say I Love You	Zi Jin	Short film
2013	Saving General Yang	Yang Wulang	
2013	Badges of Fury	Gao Min	Cameo
2013	Baby Blues	Yip Tou/Hao	
2014	Hello Babies	Hospital director	Cameo
2019	P Storm	Tso Yuen-Yuen	
2022	New Kung Fu Cult Master 1	Cheung Mo-kei	
2022	New Kung Fu Cult Master 2	Cheung Mo-kei	
2022	Detective vs Sleuths	Fong Lai Sun	
2024	Twilight of the Warriors: Walled In	Chan Lok Kwan	
2025	Back to the Past	Ying Ching	

=== Television series ===
Year	Title	Role	Notes/Ref.
1999	At the Threshold of an Era	Prison officer	extra
1999	A Kindred Spirit	Waiter	extra
1999	Plain Love	Tea Brewing Staff	extra
1999	Side Beat	Receptionist	extra
2000	Crimson Sabre	Intruder	extra
2000	Incurable Traits	Soldier	extra
2001	A Taste of Love	Kong Sheung-yau	
2001	A Step Into The Past	Chiu Poon / Ying Ching	
2002	Eternal Happiness	Wongpo Siu-wah	
2002	Golden Faith	Oscar Ting Sin Hang	
2002	Lofty Waters Verdant Bow	Kam Sai-wai	
2003	Survivor's Law	Ben Lok Bun	
2004	Blade Heart	Mang Lui / Captain Cho Ngan	
2004	Twin of Brothers	Kou Chung	
2004	The Last Breakthrough	Dr. Ken Tsai	
2005	Yummy Yummy	Daniel Yau	
2006	Lethal Weapons of Love and Passion	Fung Hang-lit	
2006	La Femme Desperado	Chai Foon	
2007	Face to Fate	Lai Yeuk-yee	
2007	Heart of Greed	Alfred Ching	
2007	Love Multiplication	Xu Kai	
2007	The Drive of Life	Wah Jun-bong	
2008	The Master of Tai Chi	Tuen Hiu-sing	
2008	The Four	Heartless / Shing Ngai-yue	
2008	Moonlight Resonance	Gam Wing-ho	
2010	The Mysteries of Love	Prof. Kingsley King	
2010	Growing Through Life	Hanson Hoi Sing	
2011	My Sister of Eternal Flower	Hugo Chiang	
2011	Men with No Shadows	Toi Fung (Typhoon)	
2011	Ad Mania	Long Tianjue	
2012	Three Kingdoms RPG	Zhuge Liang	
2012	Highs and Lows	Wai Sai-lok (Happy Sir)	
2013	The Purple Hairpin	Nalan Dong	
2014	The Virtuous Queen of Han	Han Wudi	
2014	Line Walker	Sit Ka-keung (Bao Seed)	
2015	Detectives and Doctors	Lu Xiaofeng	
2015	The Door	Shen Lixing	
2017	Rule The World	Huang Taiji	Web series
2019	Police Tactical Unit	Gao Jiasheng	Web series
2020	Line Walker: Bull Fight	Sit Ka-keung (Bao Seed)	
2021	Star of Ocean	Lin Heng Zhi	
2021	The Mask	Ji Ping	
2022	In the Storm	Wai King-sing	
2023	The Legends of Changing Destiny	Sun Wukong	Web series
2024	The Heir to the Throne	Ko Chun	

=== Variety show ===
Year	Title	Notes
2011	All Star Glam Exam	Episode 16-17: Guest member
2015	Chef Nic	Season 2, Episode 12: Guest member
2019	Keep Running	Season 7, Episode 11: Guest member
2021	Viva La Romance	Season 5
2022	Call Me by Fire	Season 2
2022	Hello, Saturday 2022	Episode 45: Guest member
2022	Braving Life	Season 2, Episode 3-5: Guest member
2022	It Sounds Incredible	Season 2, Episode 12: Guest member
2022	Memories Beyond Horizon	Episode 12: Guest member
2023	Our Inn	Episode 8: Guest member
2023	Star Chaser	Season 3: Regular member

== Discography ==
=== Albums ===
Year	Album title	Album information
2007	Searching For You In Loving Memories	Release date: 23 November 2007; Label: EEG
2008	Your Love	Release date: 10 September 2008; Label: EEG
2008	Your Love 2nd Edition	Release date: 24 September 2008; Label: EEG
2009	Let's Get Wet	Release date: 15 June 2009; Label: EEG
2010	Come 2 Me	Release date: 17 July 2010; Label: EEG
2011	First	Release date: 4 March 2011; Label: EEG
2011	LF	Release date: 22 July 2011; Label: EEG
2012	Self-Portrait	Release date: 17 August 2012; Label: EEG
2013	A Time 4 You	Release date: 25 January 2013; Label: EEG
2016	TRAP	Release date: 20 March 2016; Label: EEG

=== Soundtrack appearances ===
Year	Title	Series	Notes
2002	記得忘記	Eternal Happiness	Sub-theme song
2002	真愛難共	Lofty Waters Verdant Bow	Theme song
2003	忘記傷害	Survivor's Law	Theme song
2004	雙子龍	Twin of Brothers	Theme song
2004	心呼吸	The Last Breakthrough	Theme song
2005	與朋友共	Yummy Yummy	Theme song
2006	出鞘	Lethal Weapons of Love and Passion	Theme song
2006	領會	Lethal Weapons of Love and Passion	Sub-theme song
2006	游劍江湖	Vagabond Vigilante	Theme song
2006	披荊斬刺	Face to Fate	Theme song
2007	心領	Heart of Greed	Sub-theme song, performed with Linda Chung
2007	愛在記憶中找你	Drive of Life	Sub-theme song
2008	浮生若水	The Master of Tai Chi	Sub-theme song
2008	愛不疚	Moonlight Resonance	Sub-theme song
2008	風暴	The Four	Theme song, performed with Ron Ng, Sammul Chan, Kenneth Ma
2009	值得流淚	Justice Bao	Theme song for TVB version
2010	直到你不找我	The Mysteries of Love	Theme song
2010	所謂理想	Growing Through Life	Theme song
2010	我們很好	Growing Through Life	Sub-theme song
2010	不想讓你失望	Growing Through Life	Theme song (Mandarin version)
2010	我們很好	Growing Through Life	Sub-theme song (Mandarin version)
2011	Light Up My Life	My Sister of Eternal Flower	Theme song
2011	似是而非	Ad Mania	Theme song (In Mandarin)
2011	試煉	Men with No Shadows	Theme song
2012	等你回来	Three Kingdoms RPG	Theme song
2012	幼稚完	Highs and Lows	Theme song
2012	同林	Love Charm to 1 Minute	Theme song
2013	On My Way	Triumph in the Skies 2	Sub-theme song
2014	Behind the Glory	The Virtuous Queen of Han	Theme song
2014	Guardianship	The Virtuous Queen of Han	Ending theme song
2015	Interlinked hearts	Detectives and Doctors	Theme song
2016	I do not believe anymore	The Six Door	Theme song
2020	Oblivious	Line Walker: Bull Fight	Theme song
2020	Feels Like Heaven	Line Walker: Bull Fight	Interlude, performed with Hana Kuk
2022	幼稚未完	The Storm	Theme Song

== Awards ==
=== Acting awards ===
==== TVB Anniversary Awards ====
Year	Category	Nominated work	Ref.
2003	Most Improved Male Artiste	Survivor's Law	
2004	Most Popular Male Character	Twin of Brothers	
2007	Mainland China's Favourite TVB Actor	—N/a	
2008	TVB Most Popular Artiste	Moonlight Resonance	
2010	TVB Most Popular Artiste	The Mysteries of Love	
2010	Most Popular Male Character	The Mysteries of Love	

==== TVB Star Awards Malaysia ====
Year	Category	Nominated work	Ref.
2003	Favorite Drama Theme Song	記得忘記	
2006	Favorite Actor	Twin of Brothers	
2006	Favorite Drama Character	Twin of Brothers	
2007	Favorite Drama Character	Food For Life	
2007	Favorite Drama Theme Song	心呼吸	
2008	Favorite Drama Character	La Femme Desperado	
2009	Favorite Drama Character	The Drive of Life	
2009	Most Unforgettable Kiss	The Drive of Life	
2010	Favorite Actor	Moonlight Resonance	
2010	Favorite Drama Character	Moonlight Resonance	
2010	Favorite On Screen Couple	Moonlight Resonance	
2011	Favorite Drama Character	The Mysteries of Love	
2012	Favorite Drama Character	Men with No Shadows	
2013	Favorite Drama Character	Highs and Lows	
2013	Favorite Drama Theme Song	幼稚完	
2014	Favorite Drama Character	Line Walker	

==== StarHub TVB Awards ====
Year	Category	Nominated work	Ref.
2010	My Favourite TVB Actor	Moonlight Resonance	
2010	My Favourite TVB Male TV Character	Moonlight Resonance	
2011	My Favourite TVB Male TV Character	The Mysteries of Love	
2011	My Favourite TVB Theme Song	我們很好	
2013	My Favourite TVB Male TV Character	Highs and Lows	
2013	Star of Perfect Poise Award	—N/a	

==== Huading Awards ====
Bout	Year	Category	Nominated work	Ref.
10th	2013	Best TV Actor (China)	—N/a	
15th	2015	Best TV Actor (China)	Line Walker, The Virtuous Queen of Han	

==== "Next" Magazine TV Awards ====
Year	Category	Nominated work	Ref.
2002	Most Promising Newcomer	A Step into the Past	
2009	Top Ten Artists	Moonlight Resonance	

=== Music awards ===
==== Jade Solid Gold Top 10 Awards ====
Year	Category	Nominated work	Ref.
2008	Most Popular New Male Artist	—N/a	
2009	Top 10 Songs	愛不疚	
2010	Most Popular Hong Kong Male Artist	—N/a	
2010	Top 10 Songs	如果時間來到	
2010	Most Popular Mandarin Song (Bronze)	明天以後	
2011	Most Popular Hong Kong Male Artist	—N/a	
2011	Top 10 Songs	直到你不找我	
2011	Most Popular Mandarin Song (Silver)	信今生愛過	
2011	Most Popular Duet Song (Gold)	初見	
2011	Most Popular Duet Song (Silver)	一直都在	
2012	Most Popular Hong Kong Male Artist	—N/a	
2012	Gold Song Award	Chok	
2012	Top 10 Songs	Chok	
2012	Most Popular Mandarin Song (Silver)	讓我愛你一小時	
2013	Most Popular Male Artist	—N/a	
2013	Most Popular Mandarin Song (Bronze)	頑石點頭	
2013	Top 10 Songs	幼稚完	
2014	Most Popular Male Artist	—N/a	
2014	Gold Song Award	同林	
2014	Gold Song Award	"Nice"	

==== RTHK Top 10 Gold Songs Awards ====
Bout	Year	Category	Nominated work	Ref.
31st	2009	Top 10 Songs	爱不疚	
32nd	2010	Outstanding Singer Award	—N/a	
34th	2012	Weibo Popular Singer	—N/a	
35th	2013	Weibo Popular Singer	—N/a	
35th	2013	Trendy Singer Award	—N/a	

==== IFPI Hong Kong Top Sales Music Award ====
Year	Category	Nominated work	Ref.
2009	Top 10 Best-Selling Local Artists	—N/a	
2009	Top 10 Best-Selling Cantonese Albums	Your Love	
2009	Top 10 Best-Selling Cantonese Albums	爱在记忆中找你	
2010	Best Selling Local Male Artist	—N/a	
2010	Top 10 Best-Selling Local Artists	—N/a	
2010	Best Selling Local DVD	峯情无限演唱会DVD	
2011	Best Selling Local Male Artist	—N/a	
2011	Top 10 Best-Selling Local Artists	—N/a	
2011	Top 10 Best-Selling Cantonese Albums	COME 2 ME	
2011	Best Selling Local DVD	Come 2 Me红馆演唱会DVD	
2011	Top 10 Online Broadcast Songs	我们很好	
2012	Top 10 Best-Selling Local Artists	—N/a	
2012	Top 10 Best-Selling Cantonese Albums	LF	
2012	Top 10 Best-Selling Mandarin Albums	第一次	
2013	Top 10 Best-Selling Cantonese Albums	Self Portrait	
2014	Best Selling Local Male Artist	—N/a	
2014	Top 10 Best-Selling Local Artists	—N/a	
2014	Top 10 Best-Selling Cantonese Albums	A Time 4 You 新曲+精选	
2014	Best Selling Local DVD	A Time 4 You林峯演唱会	
2017	Best Selling Local Male Artist	—N/a	
2017	Top 10 Best-Selling Local Artists	—N/a	
2017	Best Selling Local DVD	Heart Attack LF Live in Hong Kong	

==== Global Chinese Music Awards ====
Bout	Year	Category	Nominated work	Ref.
11th	2011	Best All=Rounded Artist	—N/a	
11th	2011	Best Stage Interpretation	—N/a	
13th	2013	All-Rounded Artist of the Year	—N/a	
13th	2013	Top 5 Most Popular Male Singer	—N/a	
13th	2013	Top 20 Most Popular Songs	顽石点头	
13th	2013	Media Recommendation Award	—N/a	
16th	2016	Outstanding Singer Award (Hong Kong)	—N/a	

==== China Music Awards ====
Bout	Year	Category	Nominated work	Ref.
17th	2013	Most Popular Male Artist (Hong Kong)	—N/a	
17th	2013	Song of the Year	情歌金曲	
20th	2016	Most Popular Male Artist (Hong Kong)	—N/a	
20th	2016	Asian Influence - Best Breakthrough Artist	—N/a	

==== 9+2 Music Pioneer Awards ====
Year	Category	Nominated work	Ref.
2007	Newcomer of the Year (Hong Kong/Taiwan)	—N/a	
2008	Best Film Singer	—N/a	
2008	Industry Improvement Award	—N/a	
2011	Best Male Singer	—N/a	
2011	Most Popular Singer	—N/a	
2011	Best Film Singer	—N/a	
2011	Most Popular Duet Song	一直都在	
2012	All-Rounded Artist Award	—N/a	
2012	Best Film Singer	—N/a	
2013	Top 5 Most Popular Singer	—N/a	
2013	Top 10 Songs (Hong Kong/Taiwan)	同林	
2013	Media Award		
2014	全国歌影视至尊艺人	—N/a	
2015	全国歌影视至尊艺人大奖	—N/a	
2015	Best Global Song	"Heart Attack"	
2015	Media Award	—N/a	
