= Bi Xiugu =

Bi Xiugu (Chinese: 畢秀姑) also known as Xiao Baicai and Bi Jinlian (1855-1930) was the main figure of a cause célèbre in 1870s China known as Yang Naiwu and Xiao Baicai.

Bi Xiugu was a beauty married to a bean seller in Yuhang in Zhejiang. When her husband died in 1873, she was reported for murder by her mother-in-law. She and her lover the academician Yang Niawu was sentenced as guilty for murder. Her lover contested the verdict on claims of corruption with support of the local aristocracy, and the case became a famous scandal. In 1877, the case was finally solved when it was revealed that governor Liu Xitong had forced witnesses to commit perjury by use of torture, and the accused were freed. Bi Xiugu became a Buddhist nun after her release.

The case became a symbol of the corruption of Qing dynasty China.

== See also ==
- Case of Yang Naiwu and Little Cabbage
