= Alex Tam =

Alex Tam 譚天樂 (Tam Tin Lok)
- Origin: Hong Kong
- Genres: Opera, Pop
- Occupations: tenor, conductor, composer

Alex Tam Tin-lok, (Chinese: 譚天樂) is a Hong Kong operatic tenor, choral conductor and composer. He is the chorus director of Opera Hong Kong, conductor of Senior A class in The Hong Kong Children's choir, and president of the Aria Academy of Music.

== Biography ==
Born in Hong Kong, Tam graduated from the Royal Academy of Music (RAM) Opera Course and the Hong Kong Academy for Performing Arts (HKAPA). He began his music studies at an early age under Chiang Wai Man, and continued under Rosaline Pi, Derek Anthony and Michael Rippon. Tam studied with Joy Mammen and Audrey Hyland at the RAM and he had sung in master classes by Dennis O'Neill and Robert Tear. Tam received the ARAM award from the Royal Academy of Music for he has made a significant contribution to the music profession. In 2018, Tam received the "Outstanding Musician Awards" from the Hong Kong Music and Dance Association.

Tam has performed over 30 operatic roles, including his first major role at the age of 19 as Rinuccio in Puccini's Gianni Schicchi under the baton of Georg Tintner. Other notable operatic roles include Almaviva (The Barber of Seville), Ferrando (Cosi fan Tutte), Nemorino (L'elisir d'amore), Tonio (La Fille du Regiment), Pluto (Orphée aux enfers), Mozart (Korsakov's Mozart and Salieri), Pong (Turandot), Tybalt (Romeo et Juliette) Testo (Monteverdi's Il Combatimentto di Tancredi e Clorinda), Jenik (The Bartered Bride), Goro (Madama Butterfly), Monostatos (The Magic Flute), Remendado (Carmen), Gaston (La Traviata) and many others.

On concert platform, Tam appeared as a soloist in J.S.Bach's 'Mass in B minor' & Mozart's 'Mass in C' with Maestro Helmuth Rilling. In Le French May 2000, Tam was invited to give a duo concert with the French soprano Elizabeth Vidal, and to be one of the soloists in 'The Voices of Light'. Tam has also been invited by the Hong Kong Arts Festival to perform leading roles in Bach's Coffee Cantata and the contemporary chamber opera Heart of Coral composed by Chan Hing Yan in 2002 & 2013 respectively.

Tam has led the Hong Kong Children's Choir as a chorus master in collaboration with the Hong Kong Philharmonic Orchestra to perform 'Symphony with Christmas Angels' in 2011 and Sinfonia antartica by Vaughan Williams in 2013. He is currently the Chorus Director of Opera Hong Kong, Choir Conductor of the HKAPA Choir, voice teacher of the HKAPA and Hong Kong Baptist University; also radio presenter of RTHK Radio 4.

== Others ==
As a composer, Alex's works have been featured in the “Alex Tam Collection” published by CU Chorus, as well as the “Alex Tam Choral Collections for Treble Voices” published by The Hong Kong Children's Choir. Notable compositions include “Trusting the Rainbow,” “A Stranger,” “Soy Sauce Rice,” and “No Woundless World.” In 2021, the HKCC presented two highly acclaimed concerts titled “HKCC sings Alex Tam,” dedicated entirely to his music. In 2025, he received the CASH Golden Sail Most Performed Work Award (Serious Music) for “Trusting the Rainbow”.

Tam studied guitar and piano while following his vocal studies, and he frequently appears as a jazz guitarist. He was invited to play the guitar by the Hong Kong Philharmonic Orchestra and the Hong Kong Sinfonietta. In June 2001, he performed with the Italian tenor Luciano Pavarotti in Hong Kong. Tam is also active in the pop musical field, composing and arranging for numerous artists and television. His works include orchestral and concert arrangements for Andy Lau, Joey Yung, Hacken Lee, Justin Lo, Sally Yeh, Jeff Cheung and Chris Wong, among others. Tam is a member of Composers and Authors Society of Hong Kong.
