= Wong Yik =

Science fiction writer

Wong Cho-keung
- Born: 15 March 1952; British Hong Kong
- Died: 5 April 2017 (aged 65); Hong Kong
- Occupation: Writer
- Writing career
- Pen name: Wong Yik(黃易); Wong On(黃安)
- Genres: martial heroes, science fiction

Wong Yik
- Traditional Chinese: 黃易
- Simplified Chinese: 黄易
Transcriptions
Standard Mandarin
- Hanyu Pinyin: Huáng Yì
Yue: Cantonese
- Jyutping: Wong4 Jik6

Wong Cho Keung
- Traditional Chinese: 黃祖強
- Simplified Chinese: 黄祖强
Transcriptions
Standard Mandarin
- Hanyu Pinyin: Huáng Zǔqiáng
Yue: Cantonese
- Jyutping: Wong4 Zou2-koeng4

Wong Cho-keung (15 March 1952 – 5 April 2017), better known by his pen name Wong Yik or Wong On, was a HongKonger writer of Wuxia (martial arts heroes) and science fiction novels. He graduated from the Department of Fine Arts of the Chinese University of Hong Kong and once worked as the Assistant Chairperson of Hong Kong Museum of Art. Apart from his literary endeavors, he was also a painter and a musician who played the piano and the guqin.

In the 1990s, after its golden age, "wuxia" fiction was increasingly under attack by the general public and was losing its previous aura. However, Wong's emergence infused new life into the genre.

Wong combined science fiction with traditional Chinese culture (metaphysics, philosophy, etc.) to create a new style of work. Currently, his popularity has resulted in some people describing this phenomenon as a flurry of Wong sweeping through China.

Upon conclusion of his longest novel, Datang Shuanglong Zhuan, Wong commented that he would like to follow in the footstep of Louis Cha and to revise and improve his released novels.

There are some Hong Kong television series adapted from Wong's novels, such as A Step Into The Past (2001), Twin of Brothers (2004) and Lethal Weapons of Love and Passion (2006).

Wong's works give readers a sense of modernity. The vivid text and the bright rhythm make the plot appear like a dynamic picture, which appears in the reader's mind, making people look like their own experience. As a master, he increased his life and death to the height of "Tao", and integrated justice and evil into his philosophical theory, and expounded his views on all things in the world with the language of philosophical charm and the thought of all things. What really gives these novels the soul is the most Chinese philosophy and traditional culture. He had very extensive experience in art, astronomy, history, metaphysics, and the number of five lines of art. He was able to study the Zhouyi ("I Ching"), the Buddhist theory and the ideas of each family, so that he could still run the traditional spirit of Chinese swordsman when he managed the creative subjects and characters.

Wong died in Hong Kong on 5 April 2017 from a stroke while in hospital at the age of 65.

== Major works ==
=== The Prosperous Tang Dynasty Quartet ===
1. The Legend of the Twin Dragons of the Great Tang Dynasty (January 1996- January 2001) - 50 volumes (794 chapters) (revised in 20 volumes)
2. The Sun and the Moon in the Sky (November 2012-April 2014) - 18 volumes
3. The Dragon Fighting in the Wild (May 2014-October 2015) - 18 volumes
4. The Bright Ring of Heaven and Earth (November 2015-April 2017) - 22 volumes (unfinished)
