= Miloš Raičković (composer) =

Milos Raickovich (Serbian: Милош Раичковић, Miloš Raičković) (born 1956) is a Serbian-American composer and anti-war activist. Some of his works are politically influenced. He was born in Belgrade, Yugoslavia.

He has composed scores for Hong Kong director Evans Chan's films.
