= Autumn trial system =

Judicial system in Qing China

- Chinese: 秋審制度
- Literal meaning: autumn trial system
Transcriptions
Standard Mandarin
- Hanyu Pinyin: Qiū Shěn Zhì Dù

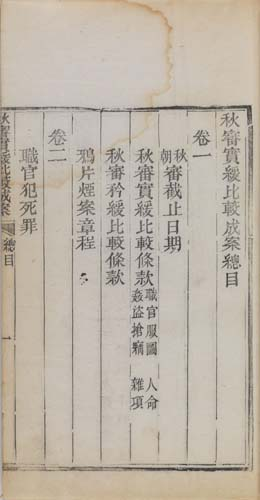
Qiushen Shihuan Bijiao Cheng-an (Chinese: 秋審實緩比較成案), a book demonstrating the autumn trial system of ancient China

The autumn trial system (Chinese: 秋審制度) was a special judicial system in the Qing dynasty of China. During the Qing dynasty, people who committed crimes like subversion and treason were sentenced to death (立決). In such cases, typically, criminals could not be amnestied. Nevertheless, people who committed crimes, like murdering a junior member in the family, might be sentenced to death penalty with a suspension, (Note: This is not identical to the death sentence with reprieve in modern China) called Zhan Jianhou or Jiao Jianhou in Chinese (斬監侯 / 絞監侯). In such cases, the officers in the Board of Justice (刑部), the Court of Judicature and Revision (大理寺), and the Court of Justice (都察院) would determine whether to execute criminals sentenced to Zhan Jianhou or Jiao Jianhou in the autumn by a procedure called the "autumn trial" (秋審制度).

After the autumn trial, around 10–20 percent of criminals sentenced to Zhan Jianhou or Jiao Jianhou would be executed, while other criminals could typically obtain a commutation or a suspension for one more year. A criminal having obtained suspensions in the autumn trial system for several times might also obtain a de facto commutation.

== See also ==
- Capital punishment in China
