= Come 2 Me =

Studio album by Raymond Lam
- Released: July 17, 2010
- Genre: Cantopop
- Producer: Emperor Entertainment Group

Raymond Lam chronology
Let's Get Wet (2009)	Come 2 Me (2010)	First (2011)

Come 2 Me is Raymond Lam's fourth album, released on July 17, 2010.

== Track listing ==
=== CD ===
1. Hello
2. Come 2 Me
3. Rain Drops (Music Only)
4. 我們很好 (We Are Fine)
5. Morning Cute
6. Flashback (Music Only)
7. 定鏡 (Fixed Mirror)
8. Vampire
9. Out Of Reach (Music Only)
10. 所謂理想 (The So-Called Ideal)
11. 一直都在 (Always Here) with Charlene Choi
12. Slow Motion (Music Only)
13. 直到你不找我 (Until You Stop Searching For Me)
14. 同謀 (Accomplice)
15. The Beginning Is The End (Music Only)
