= My Sister of Eternal Flower =

- Official poster
- 花花世界花家姐
- Genre: Drama
- Starring: Charmaine Sheh; Raymond Lam; Ngo Ka-nin; Toby Leung; Bowie Wu; Jazz Lam; Yoyo Chen; Catherine Chau; Annie Chong
- Opening theme: “Light Up My Life” by Raymond Lam, Unknown instrumental music for EncoreTVB version
- Country of origin: Hong Kong
- Original language: Cantonese
- No. of episodes: 20

Production
- Producer: Kwan Wing Chung
- Production location: Hong Kong
- Camera setup: Multi camera
- Running time: 42 – 45 minutes
- Production company: TVB

Original release
- Network: TVB Jade
- Release: 16 May 2011 – June 10, 2011

Related
- Relic of an Emissary; Wax and Wane

My Sister of Eternal Flower (Traditional Chinese: 花花世界花家姐), is the title of a Hong Kong television drama starring Charmaine Sheh, Raymond Lam, Ngo Ka-nin, and Toby Leung. Produced by Kwan Wing Chung My Sister of Eternal Flower is a TVB production. It premiered on 16 May 2011.

== Synopsis ==
The company XENUS was successfully run by Zhang Sum (Bowie Wu). One day Zhang Sum ended up in the hospital, and his spoiled grandson Hugo (Raymond Lam) took over the company. However, Hugo was incapable and loses control of the company to Mike (Ngo Ka-nin), a genuinely skilled manager.

Mike manipulated the company and moved all the clients to his own company. XENUS was near collapse, while Hugo loses everything and becomes the joke of society. At the lowest point of his life, the only one that backed him up was a mentally low-IQ girl Fa Lai-chu (Charmaine Sheh). Hugo would bounce back and have to decide between the intellectually disabled girl Fa and Agnes (Yoyo Chen), the beautiful perfect model who didn't stand by him enough.

== Cast ==
=== Fa's family ===
Cast	Role	Description
Charmaine Sheh	Fa Lai Chu, JoJo 花麗珠	Intellectual disabilities with only 10 year-old's IQ; Restaurant waitress, later XENUS Bountique's office assistant Lo Fung's niece Fa Lai Ping and Fa Wai Chung's elder sister Zhang Yik's girlfriend, later wife
Toby Leung	Fa Lai Ping, Jenny or Jennifer 花麗萍	XENUS Bountique's brand officer Lo Fung's niece Luk Ho Cheung's girlfriend, finally wife Fa Lai Chu's younger sister Fa Wai Chung's elder sister To Ting's college friend
Jazz Lam	Fa Wai Chung, Danny 花偉聰	A bartender Lo Fung's nephew Fa Lai Chu and Fa Lai Ping's younger brother Chi Hei's boyfriend, later broke up Luk Mei Tsz's boyfriend

=== Chiang's family ===
Cast	Role	Description
Bowie Wu	Zhang Sum 蔣森	XENUS Boutique chairman Zhang Yik's grandfather
Raymond Lam	Zhang Yik, Hugo 蔣奕	XENUS Boutique's brand general manager, later demoted to office assistant Zhang Sum's grandson Fai Lai Chu's boyfriend, later husband To Ting's boyfriend, later broke up Luk Ho Cheung's friend

=== Luk's family ===
Cast	Role	Descripsion
Pierre Ngo Ka-nin	Luk Ho Cheung, Mike 陸浩昌	XENUS Bountique's brand general manager Fa Lai Ping's boyfriend and supervisor, eventually husband Zhang Yik's friend Luk Mei Tsz's elder brother Had stomach cancer, finally recovered (Semi-villain)
Annie Chong	Luk Mei Tsz, Gigi 陸美芝	XENUS Bountique's sales executive Luk Ho Cheung's younger sister Fa Wai Chung's girlfriend Was jailed for two years due to drug hiding Released from jail in Episode 9

=== Ha's family ===
Cast	Role	Description
Wong Ching	Ha Yi Bun 哈爾濱	A former triad leader A mahjong school and pornographic magazine owner Ha Kau Kau's father
Catherine Chau	Ha Kau Kau 哈皎皎	Intellectual disabilities Ha Yi Bun's daughter Fa Lai chu's best friend

=== XENUS Boutique ===
Cast	Role	Description
Bowie Wu	Zhang Sum 蔣森	Chairman
Raymond Lam	Zhang Yik, Hugo 蔣奕	Brand general manager, later degraded to office assistant then fired from office.
Ngo Ka-nin	Luk Ho Cheung, Mike Luk 陸浩昌	Brand general manager Fa Lai Ping's boyfriend and supervisor (Semi-villain)
Yeung Ying Wai		Human Resources manager
Tsang Wai Wan	Ho Yuet Tai 何月娣	Purchase & Maintenance manager, later fired by Luk Ho Cheung
Toby Leung	Fa Lai Ping, Jenny 花麗萍	Brand officer Luk Ho Cheung's girlfriend and subordinate, later wife.
Peter Lai	Ng Yuen Chai 吳懸濟	Purchase & Maintenance officer
Mat Yeung	Koo Suk Lam 古叔藍	Purchase & Maintenance officer
Charmaine Sheh	Fa Lai Chu,花麗珠	Office assistant
Kibby Lau	Teresa	Secretary
Lily Ho	Chi Hei, Kimchi, Kim Kim 池晞	Sales executive Fa Wai Chung's girlfriend, later broke up Bullied Fa Wai Chung (Villain)
Shermon Tang	Dora	Sales executive
Cha Cha Chan	Elaine	Sales executive
Chung Wong	Luk Mei Tsz, Gigi 陸美芝	Sales executive

=== Other cast ===
Cast	Role	Description
Yoyo Chen	To Ting, Agnes 杜婷	Agnes. D A top-model Zhang Yik's girlfriend, later broke up Fa Lai Ping's friend Chan Po Lai's girlfriend, later broke up Framed Fa Lai-chu (Semi-villain)
Chun Wong	Lo Fung 魯鳳	Lo Fung Restaurant owner Fa Lai Chu, Fa Lai Ping and Fa Wai Chung's uncle
Benjamin Yuen	Chan Po Lai 陳步禮	Grandson of Zhang Sum's business rival Zhang Yik's enemy To Ting's boyfriend, later broke up Bullied To Ting (Villain)
Yeung Chun-hung	Ngai Suk Fai 倪淑輝	Zhang Yik's friend/partner-in-crime
Casper Chan	Si Hong Man Wai 司空敏慧	Zhang Yik's friend/partner-in-crime
Wilson Tsui	Kau Kei 裘其	A fabrics store owner Lo Fung and Fa Lai Chu's friend
Calvin Chan		
Cheng Fan-sang		Mahjong house co-worker
Sin Ho-ying		Mahjong house co-worker
Chan On-ying		
Cheung Kwok-keung		

== Awards and nominations ==
=== 45th TVB Anniversary Awards 2011 ===
- Nominated: Best Drama
- Nominated: Best Actress (Charmaine Sheh)
- Nominated: Most Improved Male Artiste (Jazz Lam)
- Nominated: Most Improved Male Artiste (Matt Yeung)

== Viewership ratings ==
	Week	Episodes	Average Points	Peaking Points	References
1	May 16–20, 2011	1 — 5	27	30	
2	May 23–27, 2011	6 — 10	26	—	
3	May 30 - June 3, 2011	11 — 15	26	—	
4	June 6–10, 2011	16 — 20	28	31	

== Analysis ==
The show did generate a lot of online comments. Some people felt that a screenplay having a mentally ill character was a disrespect to the mentally disabled community. Others felt that the role played by Charmaine Sheh is largely a copy of Roger Kwok's role of a mentally disabled person (previously in Square Pegs).
