= The Great Tang Dynasty Twin Dragons =

Mouhaap novel by Wong Yee

- Author: Wong Yee
- Original title: 大唐雙龍傳
- Language: Chinese Language
- Series: 63 volumes 20 volumes(revised edition)
- Genre: Historical Fiction Wuxia
- Publication date: January 1996 – January 2001 (Wong Yee Publishing); September 23, 2002 – December 16, 2002 (Published by Times); February 2010(Yunnan People's Publishing)
- Publication place: Hong Kong
- Media type: paperback
- Followed by: Sun and Moon in the Sky

The Great Tang Dynasty Twin Dragons is a Wuxia novel written by Wong Yee based on the background of the end of the Sui dynasty and the beginning of the Tang dynasty, which integrates history, military, and fantasy. The full set of books totals more than 5 million words. It has been adapted into TV dramas, comics, and games etc.

== Plot summary ==
The story tells about the Sui dynasty, Emperor Yang's insatiable desire, two small gangsters who have gone without eating for all three meals every day, with their natural resources and chances, and how they changed the fate of martial arts- and even the world.

Kou Zhong and Xu Ziling are two gangsters in Jiangdu, Yangzhou who have not eaten three meals a day . They were chased and killed by Yuwen Huaji because they accidentally picked up the Taoist martial arts classic " Longevity Jue ". They survived under the shelter of "Raksha Girl" Fu Jun. Later, in order to protect Kou Zhong and Xu Ziling, Fu Junxu fought against Yuwen Huaji and died. Before his death, he revealed the key clues of Ssangyong's "Yanggong Treasure"; they both determined to learn martial arts well and swear. Ren Yu culture and revenge for Fu Jun's son and hate, and then break away from the career of a small gangster. Started to study "Longevity Jue" and learned the secrets of Yang Gong's treasure, but because of this, he was coveted and threatened by others.

Kou Xu and the two first wandered the rivers and lakes, and their daily martial arts progressed. Then they met Houhou, the first disciple of the Yingui School of the Demon Men, and discovered that the "Longevity Jue" was on Ssangyong. They joined the chase and killed them all. Kou Zhong and Xu Ziling not only survived many disasters, but also greatly increased their martial arts by virtue of the internal strength of the "Longevity Jue" and some comprehensible martial arts moves. During the adventure, Ssangyong had to meet Li Shimin, the second son of the Li Clan. The two people admired Li Shimin's magnanimity and ambition to dominate the world. They wanted to submit, but Ssangyong came from a humble background and was not treated equally by everyone. In addition, Kou Zhong was heartbroken for Li Xiuning's inconspicuousness, and Kou Zhong was determined to devote himself to fighting for the world's hegemony. Ranks. But it also changed the personality of the two. Kou Zhong is very active and a natural adventurer, so he pursued the great aspirations of Lu Zhongyuan; Xu Ziling is so quiet, although he is in the world, there is an elegant wind.

Ssangyong fought the world, saw the suffering people, and became more determined to save the country and the people. After stealing "He's Bi" to expand and transform the meridians, he refined his martial arts attainments through the method of raising battles by fighting, and gradually controlled the resources available in the surrounding area, in order to compete with the surrounding nobles. After getting acquainted with Ba Fenghan and the "passionate son" Hou Xibai, the two sides gradually established a friendship of mutual adversity from a hostile situation. Although born in the lower class, Ssangyong has a faithful style and an extraordinary charm, which won the attachment of some people.

Although the two of them have different personalities, they have a deep friendship. They have worked side by side to resolve crises many times. They also created a young marshal army and raised the treasures of Yang Gong. They were able to develop the foundation of contending for the world in Pengliang. Kou Zhong leads the Marshal Army, and he meets Shang Xiufang, the world's number one talented woman, while Xu Ziling explores the ultimate martial arts, and meets Shi Qingxuan, the master of Xiao Yi .

Later, the two went far beyond the Great Wall to practice together with Ba Fenghan and benefited a lot. Both martial arts have made great strides. After returning to Turkey, and the army began to rival Li Shimin rivalry, and finally by Chi Hong Ching Shi Feixuan lobby, in the case of righteous, Kouzhong eventually put down the idea of becoming emperor. Assist Qin King Li Shimin, help him initiate the change of Xuanwumen and ascend to the throne, and immediately retreat to the rivers and lakes and Xiaoao Mountain.

== Characters ==
There are many characters in "The Legend of Double Dragon of Tang Dynasty", and there are at least 748 people. There are many different tribes, in setting the nation on Han Chinese, barbarian, Sichuan minority, south Vulgar Liao, Korea, Turks, prairie ethnic groups and so on.

- Kou Zhong (Chinese: 寇仲) study the Changsheng Jue, and become martial artists themselves.
- Tzui Zhi Ling (Chinese: 徐子陵) two gangsters in Jiangdu.
- Lee Sau Ling (Chinese: 李秀寧)
- Wan Wan (Chinese: 婠婠)
- Shek Ching Shuen (Chinese: 石青璇)
- Szee Fei Hyun (Chinese: 師妃暄)
- Sung Yuk Chi (Chinese: 宋玉致)

== Published version ==
- 1996–2000: Hong Kong, Huang Yi Publishing House, first edition, 63 volumes.
- 1996–2000: Taiwan, published by Vientiane, first edition, volume 1-59. In 2000, due to the arrears of manuscript fees by Vientiane Publishing House, 60 to 63 volumes were directly distributed from Hong Kong to Taiwan for sale.
- 2002: Taiwan, published by The Times, reprinted and revised edition, 20 volumes.
- 2004: Hong Kong, Huang Yi Publishing House, Revised Collector's Edition, 20 volumes.
- 2019: Taiwan, Gaia Culture, Collector's Edition, 21 volumes.

== Writing method ==
""Bang!" The shattered temple door was shattered into fragments and splashed away. At the same time, a woman appeared at the door.... "Chang!" The woman pulled the blade away from her sheath. Sen Han's sword aura swept Jiaoxie.... The woman's full-length dress was flying, and the sword glow skyrocketed. The bitter murderous aura immediately filled the audience. Jiao Xie knew that he would never let the opponent get the first chance, and then drink wildly. With a sound, people followed the knife in, turned into a rolling knife shadow, and rushed towards the other party. At this time, all the men came to help out. The white-clothed woman screamed, slanted and flew above Jiaoxie's head. The long sword slashed under the lightning. "Dang!" The sword blades fought....The white-clothed woman volleyed and fell between the two big men who had just arrived on the battlefield. The sword flew, and the two whirled. Fei fell away and couldn't get up again.... No matter where the sword was wounded, the sword hit his life. The five internal organs were shattered by the sword qi and died. When Jiao Xie recovered his qi, only The remaining four subordinates were still struggling to support, and they couldn't help but rushed up. The last one fell to the ground.... Jiao Xiezhan tried his best. When he blocked the sixth sword, the steel was beaten. Jiao Xie's life-threatening knife was cut by a sharp sword. Jiao Xie was so shocked that he used the broken hilt as a hidden weapon and threw it at the other party while raising his breath. Amidst the laughter, the woman whirled. The body not only avoided the broken hilt of the lasing shot, but also threw the long sword.

— "Datang Shuanglong Biography" Volume One, pages 11-13.

The plot features are similar to role-playing games, which can be divided into two aspects, one is the switching of the screen and the change of the narrative angle, and the other is the event triggered by the event, which is interlocking. Main line. The former is also about expressive techniques. When writing text, it is very focused on the creation of a sense of the picture. The text is used to shape the overall space, color, temperature, sound, role movements, etc., a very clear description is given, and left to Readers have less white space in their imagination and describe a lot of details more directly.

In the two-line narration, one paragraph of Xu Ziling's story and one paragraph of Kou Zhongshi's practice are adopted. If one of the people is skipped and connected, it is a very smooth and complete narrative, but the author deliberately intersperses the two people's parts. The writing seems to split the integrity of the text, but it has the advantage of allowing events to happen at the same time, making the events more authentic and credible. Even at the same time, the messages of Ssangyong in different scenes far away are transmitted to make the omniscient. Readers can fully see the connection of events.

== Follow-up works ==
Since November 2012, Huang Yi has published a monthly volume of "The Sun and the Moon in the Sky ". After the little girl Ming Kong ( Wu Zhao ) who appeared at the end of The Legend of Twin Dragons of the Great Tang Dynasty became the empress, he collected the "Devil Strategy of Heaven". "The Dafa of Dao Heart Seeds Demon" is the beginning of the story.

"The Sun Moon in the Sky" was released in April 2014 to Volume 18, and was continued in May 2014 with "The Dragon Fight in the Wild ". " Dragon Fighting in the Wild" was released in October 2015 to Volume 18, and was continued with "The Bright Ring of Heaven and Earth" in November 2015 but the author could not finish the novel due to his demise.

== Adapted works ==
=== Comic ===
- Comic -by Huang Yulang and Qiu Fulong . The story tells that in the last years of the Sui dynasty, Emperor Yang wanted to fulfill his insatiable desires. He had two small gangsters who did not continue to eat three meals a day. With his natural resources and luck, he changed the fate of martial arts and even the world. Kou Zhong and Xu Ziling are two little gangsters in Jiangdu, Yangzhou who have not eaten three meals a day. They were hunted down and killed by Yuwen Huaji after they accidentally picked up the Taoist martial arts classic "Longevity Jue". Secret Art, and learned the secret of Yang Gong's treasure, but because of this, he was coveted and threatened by others.

=== TV series ===
- In the TV series produced by Hong Kong TVB in 2004, some plots are different from the novel version. There is a big gap between TV and the original.
- 2011 mainland Chinese historical drama martial arts TV series.

=== Game ===
- Twin of Brothers - by the power of science and technology production, Soft-World International issued a stand-alone game. Issued in July 2001.
- Huang Yi Qun Xia Chuan Online -an online game based on Huang Yi's novels.
