= Chan Hing-yan =

Composer and music educator

- Occupation: composer
- Known for: classical music
- Notable work: Enigmas of the Moon

Hing-yan Chan is a composer and music educator. He is the James Chen & Yuen-Han Chan Endowed Professor in Music of University of Hong Kong. Chan received his D.M.A. from the University of Illinois at Urbana–Champaign, majoring in composition and minoring in ethnomusicology.

== Biography ==
Professor Chan Hing-Yan is Professor of Music at The University of Hong Kong (HKU). He is arguably Hong Kong’s most representative and prolific composer in the classical music scene. His recent works include three chamber operas; the most recent being last year’s Ghost Love – a chamber opera after Xu Xu’s novella.

The two other operas, Heart of Coral – after the life of Xiao Hong (2013) and Datong – the Chinese Utopia (2015), were commissioned by the Hong Kong Arts Festival, and led to the Festival engaging Professor Chan for the extravaganza staged cantata Hong Kong Odyssey, for which he composed half the music. He was also its Music Director, mentoring three young composers and over 100 musicians. The programme was a highlight of the 2017 Festival to commemorate the 20th anniversary of the city’s handover.

Lauded for their subtle mediation between Chinese elements and Western idioms, Professor Chan’s compositions have been heard around the world at festivals such as Canberra International Music Festival (2017); Hong Kong Music Series in London (2017) and Hong Kong Week, Taipei (2014, 2016); the Second Spring of the Chinese Symphony, Beijing (2010); Edinburgh Festival (2009); Chinese Musicians Residency, Cornell (2009); and Hommage a Bartók, Budapest (2006).

Professor Chan has closely collaborated with the Hong Kong Sinfonietta (HKS) over the past 20 years. The orchestra has commissioned and performed his works at home and abroad in Europe, the Americas, Taiwan, Beijing, and Shanghai. While serving as HKS’s Artist Associate (2016-18), Professor Chan contributed two works: November Leonids – for orchestra, and Ethereal Is the Moon – for huqin and orchestra.

Professor Chan was conferred a Best Artist Award (Music) at the Hong Kong Arts Development Awards 2013, organised by the Hong Kong Arts Development Council. His work with the City Contemporary Dance Company won him much acclaim as well as a Hong Kong Dance Award in 2008. He was also recognised under the Secretary for Home Affairs’ Commendation Scheme that same year.

At HKU, Professor Chan was bestowed an Outstanding Research Student Supervisor Award (2013-14). In addition, he has been an advisor to the University’s Cultural Management Office since its inception, and has been instrumental in planning and delivering a number of innovative programmes for its MUSE series, including: The Humanistic Bach; Music Opera and Orchestra: in dialogue with maestro Shao-Chia Lü; The Musical Murakami; Open Rehearsal: the Human Requiem; Szymanowski Quartet and HKU Composers; and Shared Stage.

Professor Chan has been involved with the local community as both consultant and speaker, working with the Arts Capacity Development Funding Scheme, the Home Affairs Bureau (since 2011), the Hong Kong Jockey Club Music and Dance Fund (2006-13), the Hong Kong Arts Development Council (since 2009), and the Leisure and Cultural Services Department (LCSD, 2007-16). During his tenure as Chairman of the LCSD’s Music Panel (2007-13), Professor Chan was the architect of various novel initiatives. The 2011 sold-out Mahler Forum, which he instigated and moderated, has remained a benchmark for his successors.

== Notable works ==
- Enigmas of the Moon, for huqin, cello & orchestra(1998)
- November Leonids(2017)
