= Let's Get Wet =

Studio album by Raymond Lam
- Released: June 16, 2009
- Genre: Cantopop
- Producer: Emperor Entertainment Group

Raymond Lam chronology
Your Love (2008)	Let's Get Wet (2009)	Come 2 Me (2010)

Let's Get Wet is Raymond Lam's third album, released on 16 June 2009. It contains 7 tracks and 3 music videos.

The title of this album has been used by Wong Cho Lam as a running gag during his concert with Raymond Lam as a guest.

== Track listing ==
=== CD ===
Track; Number	Song	Composer	Lyrics	Arranger	Producer	Length
1	Let's Get Wet	Chi Wai Tang; Benedict Chong	Wyman Wong	Benedict Chong	Chi Wai Tang; Benedict Chong	4:17
2	換個方式愛你; Change The Way I Love You	Chi Wai Tang	Sandy Chang	Johnny Yim	Chi Wai Tang	3:56
3	得寵; Gaining Favor	Davide Esposito; Francesco de Benedittis; Paul Manners	Mini Choi	Jia Ma	Early Morning @U'S Music; Ronnie Ng	4:12
4	如果時間來到; If Time Arrives	Chi Wai Tang	Sandy Chang	Johnny Yim	Chi Wai Tang	3:46
5	值得流淚; Worth of Tears	Chi Wai Tang	Sandy Chang	Johnny Yim	Chi Wai Tang	4:13
6	愛鬥大; Scrambling With Love	Ahn Young-Min; Edward Shin; Kim Do-Hoon	Keith Chan Siu-kei	Jia Ma	Early Morning @U'S Music; Ronnie Ng	4:17
7	Illusion	Chi Wai Tang; Benedict Chong	Xiazhi	Benedict Chong	Chi Wai Tang; Benedict Chong	4:33

=== DVD ===
Disc; Number	Song	Composer	Lyrics	Arranger	Producer	Length
1	Let's Get Wet	Chi Wai Tang; Benedict Chong	Wyman Wong	Benedict Chong	Chi Wai Tang; Benedict Chong	4:17
2	換個方式愛你; Change The Way I Love You	Chi Wai Tang	Sandy Chang	Johnny Yim	Chi Wai Tang	3:56
4	如果時間來到; If Time Arrives	Chi Wai Tang	Sandy Chang	Johnny Yim	Chi Wai Tang	3:46
