= Finding Love in Memories =

愛在記憶中找你

Studio album by Raymond Lam
- Released: Hong Kong 23 November 2007; South Korea 1 May 2025
- Genre: Cantopop
- Producer: Emperor Entertainment Group

Raymond Lam chronology
愛在記憶中找你 (2007)	Your Love (2008)

Searching for You in Loving Memories is Raymond Lam's debut album and was released on 23 November 2007. It contains ten tracks with a bonus DVD track containing two music videos. It is released with three different covers for variation.

== Track listing ==
CD

1. 愛在記憶中找你 (Searching For You In Loving Memories)
2. 朋友, 請不要傷悲 (My Friend, Please Don't Be Sad)
3. 赤地轉機 (Turning Point)
4. 你並不孤單 (You Are Not Alone)
5. 原罪 (Original Sin)
6. 真的哭了 (I Really Cried)
7. 潑墨桃花 (Ink On Sakura)
8. 一次一次一次 (One Time, One Time, One Time)
9. 反話 (Opposite Words)
10. 自己保重 (Take Care of Yourself)

DVD

1. 愛在記憶中找你 MV (Searching For You In Loving Memories MV)
2. 赤地轉機 MV (Turning Point MV)
