= List of TVB series (1996) =

This is a list of series released by or aired on TVB Jade Channel in 1996.

== First line series ==
These dramas aired in Hong Kong from 7:00 to 8:00 pm, Monday to Friday on TVB.

Airing date	English title (Chinese title)	Number of episodes	Main cast	Theme song (T) Sub-theme song (ST)	Genre	Notes	Official website
19 Feb- 15 Mar	Mutual Affection 河東獅吼	20	Liu Wai-hung, Esther Kwan, Gordon Lam, Gigi Fu, Natalie Wong	T: "愛你恨你" (Sally Yeh); ST: "怕老婆會發達" (David Lui)	Costume drama	Copyright notice on VHS: 1995.	
18 Mar- 3 May	Dark Tales 聊齋	35	Gallen Lo, Grace Yu, Jamie Weng, Cynthia Khan, Siu-ho Chin, Elizabeth Lee	T: "隔世情" (Cass Phang)	Costume drama	Prequel to 1998's Dark Tales II.	
6 May- 31 May	Money Just Can't Buy 天降財神	20	Bobby Au Yeung, Mariane Chan, Roger Kwok, Hilary Tsui	T: "運財有福星" (Natalis Chan)	Modern drama		
3 Jun- 21 Jun	Crossing Boundaries 盞鬼老豆	20	Liu Wai-hung, Mimi Kung, Benz Hui	T: "覺悟" (Vivian Lai)	Modern drama	Released overseas on April 3, 1995. Copyright notice: 1995.	
24 Jun- 16 Aug	State of Divinity 笑傲江湖	40	Jackie Lui, Fiona Leung, Cherie Chan, Timmy Ho, He Meitian, Wong Wai, Henry Lo	T: "活得瀟灑" (Alan Tam & Priscilla Chan)	Costume drama	Overseas version 43 episodes	Official website
19 Aug- 6 Sep	The Price to Pay 五個醒覺的少年	20	John Tang, May Kwong, Carlo Ng, Gordon Liu	T: "改改改" (Hacken Lee)	Modern drama	Released overseas on December 4, 1995. Copyright notice: 1995.	
9 Sep- 4 Oct	Night Journey 殭屍福星	20	Yuen Wah, Daniel Chan, Louisa So, Cheung Kwok Keung, Halina Tam	T: "今天開始" (Daniel Chan); ST: "天生一對" (Daniel Chan)	Costume drama		
7 Oct- 15 Nov	Food of Love 闔府統請	30	Wong He, Kenix Kwok, Marco Ngai, Eddie Cheung, Fennie Yuen	T: "闔府統請" (Gabriel Harrison)	Modern drama		
10 Nov- 20 Dec	Journey to the West 西遊記	30	Dicky Cheung, Kwong Wah, Wayne Lai, Evergreen Mak	T: "西遊記" (Dicky Cheung)	Costume drama	Prequel to 1998's Journey to the West II.	Official website
30 Dec 1996- 24 Jan 1997	In the Name of Love 有肥人終成眷屬	20	Kent Cheng, Sunny Chan, Gigi Fu, Theresa Lee	T: "但願有情人" (Eric Moo)	Modern drama	Copyright notice: 1996 (Eps. 1-18), 1997 (Eps. 19-20).	

== Second line series ==
These dramas aired in Hong Kong from 9:35 to 10:35 pm, Monday to Friday on TVB.

Airing date	English title (Chinese title)	Number of episodes	Main cast	Theme song (T) Sub-theme song (ST)	Genre	Notes	Official website
5 Feb- 3 May	Cold Blood Warm Heart 天地男兒	65	Adam Cheng, Gallen Lo, Julian Cheung, Louis Koo, Jessica Hsuan, Astrid Chan, Maggie Cheung, Christine Ng, Nadia Chan	T: "從不放棄" (Adam Cheng)	Modern drama	Grand production	Official website
6 May- 7 Jun	Outburst; 900重案追兇	25	Deric Wan, Lawrence Ng, Jessica Hsuan	T: "主角還是你" (Deric Wan)	Modern suspense		
10 Jun- 5 Jul	Wars of Bribery 廉政行動組	20	Aaron Kwok, Athena Chu, Esther Kwan, Marco Ngai	T: "脫軌" (Aaron Kwok) ST: "忘不了" (Aaron Kwok)	Modern drama		
8 Jul- 2 Aug	Ambition 孽吻	20	Gallen Lo, Amy Kwok, Michael Tao, Noel Leung	T: Overseas version: "不懂得原諒你" (Sammi Cheng); Jade version: "别想念我" (Cass Phang)	Modern drama	Released overseas on December 26, 1993. Copyright notice: 1993 (Eps. 1-15 & 19-20), 1994 (Eps. 16-18).	
5 Aug- 30 Aug	Nothing to Declare 緝私群英	20	Wong He, Bobby Au Yeung, Mariane Chan, Halina Tam	T: "我以你自豪" (George Lam)	Modern action	Released overseas on November 27, 1995. Copyright notice: 1995.	
2 Sep- 25 Oct	Once Upon a Time in Shanghai 新上海灘	40	Adam Cheng, Sunny Chan, Carol Cheng, Gordon Lam, Nadia Chan, Maggie Cheung, Gallen Lo, Noel Leung	T: "能否再遇上" (Adam Cheng)	Period drama	Remake of 1980's The Bund.	
28 Oct- 6 Dec	The Criminal Investigator II; O記實錄II	30	Felix Wong, Gallen Lo, Sunny Chan, Gigi Lai, Joe Ma, Mariane Chan, Bondy Chiu	T: "真相" (Jacky Cheung)	Modern action	Sequel to 1995's The Criminal Investigator.	Official website
9 Dec 1996- 3 Jan 1997	One Good Turn Deserves Another 地獄天使	20	Maggie Cheung, Kenneth Chan, Louisa So	T: "回報" (Priscilla Chan); ST: "愛亦要捨棄" (Priscilla Chan)	Modern drama	Released overseas on July 8, 1996.	

== Third line series ==
These dramas aired in Hong Kong from 10:35 to 11:05 pm, Monday to Friday on TVB.

Airing date	English title (Chinese title)	Number of episodes	Main cast	Theme song (T) Sub-theme song (ST)	Genre	Notes	Official website
15 May 1995- 17 Nov 1999	A Kindred Spirit 真情	1128	Louise Lee, Lau Dan, Nancy Sit, Kenix Kwok, Sunny Chan, Louisa So, Florence Kwok, Hawick Lau, Kingdom Yuen, David Lui, Melissa Ng, Michael Tse, Joyce Tang, Fiona Yuen, Joe Ma	T: "無悔愛你一生" (Joyce Lee)	Modern sitcom	Copyright notice: 1995 (Eps. 1-59), 1996 (Eps. 60-212), 1997 (Eps. 213-320), 1998 (Eps. 321-469), 1999 (Eps. 470-590).	Official website

== Other series ==
Airing date	English title (Chinese title)	Number of episodes	Main cast	Theme song (T) Sub-theme song (ST)	Genre	Notes	Official website
19 Apr- 16 May	The Rise Of The Taiji Master 武當張三豐	20	Eddie Kwan, Fiona Leung, Savio Tsang, Elaine Ho	T: "風笑痴" (Wakin Chau)	Costume drama	Released overseas in 1994. Copyright notice: 1994 (Eps. 1-19), 1995 (Ep. 20).	
17 May- 13 Jun	Ancient Heroes 隋唐群英會	20	Dominic Lam, Eddie Cheung, Patrick Tam, Mariane Chan	T: "傲氣群英" (Andy Hui)	Costume drama	Released overseas on June 22, 1995. Copyright notice: 1995.	
22 Sep- 20 Oct	ICAC Investigators 1996 廉政行動1996	5	Ti Lung, Joe Ma, Ben Wong, Ruco Chan, Simon Yam, Lawrence Ng, Amy Kwok, Monica Chan, Mark Kwok, Elvis Tsui		Modern drama	In collaboration with ICAC.	
