= Ting Hai effect =

Stock market phenomenon

- Traditional Chinese: 丁蟹效應
Transcriptions
Standard Mandarin
- Hanyu Pinyin: dīng xiè xiàoyìng
Yue: Cantonese
- Jyutping: ding1 haai5 haau6 jing3

The Ting Hai effect, also known as the Adam Cheng effect, is a stock market phenomenon in which there is a sudden and unexplained drop in the stock market whenever a film or a television series starring Hong Kong actor Adam Cheng is released. It still remains as a popular topic among stock brokers, years after the television drama The Greed of Man was broadcast in Hong Kong in late 1992. The effect is named after Ting Hai, the primary antagonist in the drama, who was portrayed by Cheng.

== Origin ==
In late 1992, the television series The Greed of Man was aired on TVB in Hong Kong. The drama centred heavily around the stock market, featuring dramatised schemes and plots by the main characters who aim to become rich through trading in the market. Ting Hai (Adam Cheng), the primary antagonist, made an immense fortune with his four sons by selling short derivatives and stocks during a bear market. Many people went broke, but the Ting family became richer and richer until their eventual defeat by the protagonist Fong Chin-bok (Sean Lau). The Ting family's demise involves Ting Hai throwing his four adult sons off the stock exchange building before jumping after them, and the gruesome scene came to be seen as a curse on the stock market that recurs whenever a television series starring Adam Cheng is aired.

The Ting Hai effect, namely the uncanny effect Adam Cheng has on the stock market, can be traced even before Greed of Man and back to 1973, when Cheng starred in Romance in the Rain, a TVB drama series based on a novel written by Chiung Yao. That year, Hong Kong's stock market fell 91.53%.

== Occurrences ==
Initially, the Ting Hai effect occurred whenever The Greed of Man or its loose sequel, Divine Retribution (produced by ATV), was broadcast in Hong Kong. However, it was observed later that the phenomenon also takes place whenever a new film or a television series starring Adam Cheng is released.

=== 1990s ===
- October 1992: The Greed of Man made its debut on TVB. The Hang Seng Index fell by between 598 and 600 points
- November 1994: Instinct made its debut on TVB. The Hang Sang Index fell by more than 2,000 points.
- September 1996: Once Upon a Time in Shanghai premiered on TVB. The Hang Seng Index fell by 300 points.
- June 1997: Cold Blood Warm Heart made its debut on TVB. The Hang Seng Index accumulated 735 points in losses.
- December 1997: Legend of Yung Ching was aired. The Hang Seng Index fell by 1.4%.
- June 1999: Lord of Imprisonment was aired. The Hang Seng Index fell by 6.5%.

=== 2000s ===
- September 2000: Divine Retribution was aired on ATV. Due to the bursting of the dot-com bubble earlier that year, the Hang Seng Index dropped by an accumulated 1,715 points, leading to falls in other stock markets around the world.
- March 2004: Blade Heart premiered in Hong Kong. The Hang Seng Index fell by 550 points over three days due to high oil prices and instability in the Middle East.
- October 2004: The Conqueror's Story premiered in Hong Kong. The Hang Seng Index fell by 198 points on the day the first episode of the drama was aired.
- March 2005: The Prince's Shadow was broadcast. On 14 March, the Hang Seng dropped by 100 points before noon but rose back by 90 points by the end of the day.
- July 2007: Return Home was broadcast. The Hang Seng Index fell by 1,165 points.
- 30 March 2009: The King of Snooker premiered in Hong Kong. The Hang Seng Index fell by 663.17 points.

=== 2010s ===
- 21 May 2012: Master of Play made its debut on TVB. The Hang Seng Index fell by 10%.
- 4 April 2013: Saving General Yang was released in Beijing. The Hang Seng Index fell by 610 points on the following day of the premiere.
- 20 April 2015: The Greed of Man was rerun on TVB, followed shortly by a rerun of Divine Retribution on ATV. The Hang Seng Index fell by 558.19 points on the first day of rerun.

=== 2020s ===
- 13 January 2020: Ever Night: Season 2 was released for streaming on Tencent Video. The Hang Seng Index kept falling until March.
- 5 October 2022: Divine Retribution was released for streaming on Disney+. The Hang Seng Index kept falling.
- 25 October 2022: Behind Silk Curtains to begin rerunning at TVB at midnight of 26 Oct. The Hang Seng Index fell 1,030 points (6.36%) at market close of 25 Oct.

== Exceptions ==
There were a few times when the Ting Hai effect did not occur. In April 2006, when Bar Bender was aired on TVB, there was a sudden rise in the Hang Seng index by 258 points. The index also rose over the course of the following series' airing cycle: Chor Lau-heung (1995), The Driving Power (2003), and The Conqueror's Story (2004).

== Legacy ==
The Ting Hai effect has led to Adam Cheng attracting much attention from the press. Whenever a new film or television series starring Cheng is about to be broadcast, some stockbrokers and investors in Hong Kong anticipate a drop in the market. Cheng himself does not believe that he is the cause of the stock prices falling, but has come to terms with the phenomenon.

While some investors have argued that the effect is no more than a series of coincidences and amounts to nothing more than a self-fulfilling prophecy, the phenomenon is regarded by some as more than coincidental. The French bank Crédit Lyonnais wrote a report on it.

== See also ==
- Urban legend
- Self-fulfilling prophecy
- Hong Kong stock market
- Market anomaly
