= Instinct (Hong Kong TV series) =

Hong Kong television drama series

- Promotional poster
- Also known as: Bản Năng 笑看风云 笑看風雲 จอมบงการ
- Genre: Drama
- Screenplay by: Chu King-kei; Jonathan Chow; Lau Chi-san; Cheung Siu-fong; Leung Man-wah; Ma Ka-wai; Chung Kin-keung; Kevin Kwok; Lau Siu-kwan; Sze Ka-wai; Chan Wai-hong; Sze Yuk-ling; Tai Tak-kwong; Tsang Kan-cheong
- Directed by: Chung Shu-kai; Choi Ching-sing; Kwong Kam-wang; Lam Kin-lung; Yeung Tin-ming; Chan Chi-kong
- Starring: Adam Cheng; Ekin Cheng; Roger Kwok; Amy Kwok; Nadia Chan; Paul Chu; Leo Ku
- Opening theme: Siu Hon Fung Wan (笑看風雲) by Adam Cheng
- Composer: Tsui Ka-leung
- Country of origin: Hong Kong
- Original language: Cantonese
- No. of episodes: 40

Production
- Producer: Tsang Kan-cheong
- Production locations: Hong Kong; Dongguan, China
- Running time: 45 minutes
- Production company: TVB

Original release
- Network: TVB Jade
- Release: November 21, 1994 – January 13, 1995

Instinct
- Traditional Chinese: 笑看風雲
- Simplified Chinese: 笑看风云
Transcriptions
Standard Mandarin
- Hanyu Pinyin: Xiào kàn fēngyún
Yue: Cantonese
- Jyutping: Siu3 Hon3 Fung1 Wan4

Instinct (Chinese: 笑看風雲) is a Hong Kong television drama series broadcast by TVB in 1994. Starring Adam Cheng, Ekin Cheng, Roger Kwok, Amy Kwok and Nadia Chan, the series premiered in November 1994 on TVB Jade.

== Plot ==
Wong Tin (Adam Cheng) is a wealthy businessman in Hong Kong. Although he is honest and righteous, he is framed by a business rival. Pau Man-lung (Ekin Cheng) is an ICAC agent tasked with investigating the case. Mutual respect soon develops among Wong Tin and Man-lung. After Man-lung loses his job, he start to work under Wong Tin with his best friend Raymond Poon Long-ching (Roger Kwok).

Although Wong Tin is a successful businessman, his personal life is not in good shape. He is divorced and his eldest daughter Sam Wong Lui (Amy Kwok) resents him. Wong Lui develop feelings for Man-lung after her mother died in a car crash. However, Man-lung had already fallen in love with Lam Ching-lit (Adia Chan).

== Cast ==
The main cast of Instinct, anti-clockwise from top right: Adam Cheng, Ekin Cheng, Roger Kwok, Adia Chan, Leo Ku(right), and Amy Kwok(left).

- Adam Cheng as Wong Tin (黃天)

A wealthy businessman who had accumulated his wealth through honest means. He employs Man-lung and Long-ching when the former loses his job. A divorcee, he strives to improve his relationship with his estranged daughter Wong Lui. After the death of his ex-wife, he marries Cheung Hok-wa.

- Ekin Cheng as Pau Man-lung (包文龍)

Formerly an agent working for the ICAC, Man-lung loses his job after a botched investigation. He starts working for Wong Tin's company alongside his best friend Long-ching. Like Wong Tin, Man-lung is also an honest and caring person. He befriended Lam Ching-lit, and the two later became a couple.

- Roger Kwok as Raymond Poon Long-ching (潘朗清)

His father was an ex-convict who was a friend of the Pau family. Long-ching is best friends with Man-lung and both of them consider each other brothers. However, unlike Man-lung, Long-ching is greedy and materialistic, willing to obtain wealth through any means possible. His greed and ambition would inadvertently cause the deaths of Wong Lui's mother and Ching-lit.

- Amy Kwok as Sam Wong Lui (黃蕾)

The eldest daughter of Wong Tin, she resented her father for divorcing her mother and causing the family to split apart. After she found out the reason for the divorce - her mother had an affair, which greatly upset Wong Tin, Wong Lui's relationship with her father improves and she starts working for him. She becomes dependent on Man-lung after her mother's death, competing with Ching-lit for his affection.

- Adia Chan as Lam Ching-lit (林貞烈)

A young woman who had rented the Pau family's extra apartment after a misunderstanding. Ching-lit comes from a troubled family and thus became a withdrawn person, only caring for her pet dog, a Shetland Sheepdog. She was also a compulsive liar. However, she soon opens her heart to Man-lung and his family when they show her kindness and acceptance, something she had been yearning for all her life. She and Man-lung develop a strong romantic relationship, but the relationship would end in tragedy when she met an untimely death.

=== Supporting cast ===
==== Pau Family ====
- Benz Hui as Pau Jan (包贊)

The patriarch of the Pau family, he is the father of Man-lung, Man-fu and Man-fung. He is greedy and cowardly, and had an affair with a woman from Dongguan. After he was cheated of his money, he repented and was forgiven by his wife, thus preventing the family from splitting up.

- Leo Ku as Pau Man-fu (包文虎)

Man-lung's younger brother. He frequently bickers with his younger sister. He briefly fell in love with a woman from Mainland China, a relationship which the family disapproved of. Later, he found work as a reporter.

==== Others ====
- Paul Chu as Poon Chong (潘仲)

Long-ching's father and friends with Wong Tin and Pau Jan. Twenty years ago, he was a voluntary scapegoat and was imprisoned for a crime committed by Pau.

- Li Shing-cheong as Lui Bak-to (雷泊滔)

A corrupt businessman who viewed Wong Tin as an enemy, even though the latter cared about him.

- Kiki Sheung as Cheung Hok-wa (張學華)

A barrister who views money as the most important thing. Initially an unscrupulous person, she soon realize the error of her ways after meeting Wong Tin, whom she would later marry. She suffered from a brain tumor, which resulted in her frequently fainting. Hok-wa eventually succumbed to her condition in the final episode.

- Kong Ngai as Ting Chun (丁進)

Wong Tin's rival. He tried to bring down Wong Tin's company through any means possible. He forged Man-lung's signature to frame him, causing Man-lung to be arrested. He dies of a heart attack in the final episode after hearing of his son's death during an attempt to murder Long-ching.

- Lau Kong as Ma Sing (馬成)

Another corrupt businessman, he had an affair with Wong Tin's first wife.

- Wayne Lai as Lawyer Poon (潘律師)

A prosecutor who appears in episode 37.

- Gordon Lam as Ivan

A consultant for Wong Tin's company who appears in episode 12.

- Ruco Chan as Peter

A childhood friend of Man-lung. This was Ruco's debut appearance in a TVB drama.

== Ting Hai effect ==
The drama was the second drama starring Adam Cheng to witness the Ting Hai effect, the first being The Greed of Man which aired in 1992. When the drama made its debut on TVB, the Hang Seng Index fell by more than 2,000 points.
