= Revelation of the Last Hero =

Hong Kong television series

- Promotional poster
- 武林啟示錄之風之刀
- Genre: Wuxia; Romance
- Screenplay by: Chan Ching-yee; Kwan Chung-ling; Sit Ka-wah; Yeung Fei; Kwok Ngok-chun; Wu Kwok-leung
- Directed by: Lin Chik-fan; Tang Chi-kit; Lau Kwok-fai; Hui Mei-kwan; Tang Kam-chuen
- Starring: Aaron Kwok; Noel Leung; Ada Choi; Fennie Yuen; Frankie Lam; Bryan Leung
- Theme music composer: William Hu
- Opening theme: Breeze in the Frost (霧裡清風) by Aaron Kwok
- Country of origin: Hong Kong
- Original language: Cantonese
- No. of episodes: 25 (Hong Kong); 30 (overseas)

Production
- Producer: Chong Wai-kin
- Production location: Hong Kong
- Camera setup: Multi camera
- Production company: TVB

Original release
- Network: TVB Jade
- Release: 2 November – 11 December 1992

Revelation of the Last Hero
- Traditional Chinese: 武林啟示錄之風之刀
- Simplified Chinese: 武林启示录之风之刀
- Literal meaning: Revelation of the Martial World: The Blade of Wind
Transcriptions
Standard Mandarin
- Hanyu Pinyin: Wǔ Lín Qǐ Shì Lù Zhī Fēng Zhī Dāo
Yue: Cantonese
- Jyutping: Mou2 Lam4 Kai2 Si4 Leok5 Zi1 Fung1 Zi1 Dou1

Revelation of the Last Hero is a 1992 Hong Kong wuxia romance television series produced by TVB and starring Aaron Kwok, Noel Leung, Ada Choi, Fennie Yuen, Frankie Lam and Bryan Leung. The theme song of the series, titled Breeze in the Frost (霧裡清風) by was sung by Kwok.

== Cast ==
- Aaron Kwok as Lok Fung (駱風)
- Noel Leung as Yiu Chi-ping (姚子平)
- Ada Choi as Ling Seung (凌湘)
- Fennie Yuen as Hak-lin But-but (赫連勃勃)
- Frankie Lam as Yiu Lik-hang (姚力行)
- Bryan Leung as Hak-lin Mung-seun (赫連蒙遜)
- Lau Kong as Sze-ma Chung-wang (司馬縱橫)
- Mannor Chan as Ling Sin (凌仙)
- Derek Kok as Sze-ma Yuk-man (司馬煜文)
- Law Lok-lam as Hung Chun (洪震)
- Wong Yat-fei as Chu Wong (朱皇)
- Yu Ching-ching as Sing Pui-yu (盛佩如)
- Andy Tai as Fong Ching (方靖)

== See also ==
- Aaron Kwok filmography
