= The Season of Fate =

Hong Kong television series

- Official poster
- 五味人生
- Genre: Period drama
- Written by: Wong Kwok Fai; Yip Sai Hong
- Starring: Roger Kwok; Esther Kwan; Michelle Yim; Derek Kok; Lawrence Ng Wai-Kwok; Oscar Leung; Elena Kong; Vivien Yeo; Mimi Lo; Regen Cheung
- Theme music composer: Tang Chi Wai
- Opening theme: "Savour" (細味) by Michael Tse
- Country of origin: Hong Kong
- Original language: Cantonese
- No. of episodes: 25

Production
- Producer: Nelson Cheung
- Production location: Hong Kong
- Camera setup: Multi camera
- Running time: 42 – 45 minutes
- Production company: TVB

Original release
- Network: TVB Jade
- Release: January 11 – February 12, 2010

The Season of Fate
- title card
- Traditional Chinese: 五味人生
- Simplified Chinese: 五味人生
- Literal meaning: "The Five Flavors of Life"
Transcriptions
Standard Mandarin
- Hanyu Pinyin: Wǔ Wèi Rén Shēng
Yue: Cantonese
- Jyutping: Ng2 Mei6 Jan4 Sang1

The Season of Fate (Traditional Chinese: 五味人生, literally The Five Flavors of Life) is a 2010 TVB television drama from Hong Kong produced by Nelson Cheung.

== Synopsis ==
The poor Lin Sheung-Chun (Esther Kwan) was sold into the Kwan family as a concubine to help pay off her father's gambling debts. However, on the night of her marriage, her husband died. Hearing her screams, Wang Yeuk-Lam (Michelle Yim), the first wife, rushes in. Seeing her husband's dead body, she assumes Sheung-Chun is the murderer and tries to stab her, hitting her head on a table in the process. Ever since, Yeuk-Lam believes that she is a young girl, and that Sheung-Chun is her mother. She has no memories of her previous life.

Since her husband is dead, and Yuek-Lam is no longer mentally stable, Sheung-Chun becomes the manager of the family bistro. There she works with her close childhood friend Leung Kau-Miu (Derek Kok). After ten long years of working hard to earn a living, Sheung-Chun finds that the bistro no longer attracts as many customers as it used to.

At this time, con-artist Ma Wing-Ching (Roger Kwok) and his apprentice Lai Shi-Mui (Regen Cheung) arrive in town. The two survive using cunning, wits, and lies. They pretend to be people of Yam Fei-Yeung (Lawrence Ng Wai-Kwok), a wealthy and well-known business tycoon, to get free stuff. When the pair swindle money from Sheung-Chun's bistro, she hunts down Wing-Ching and punches him, leaving him with a black eye. Thus, the rivalry between the two begin. Wing-Ching takes every available opportunity to take advantage of the Kwan family's kindness, but Sheung-Chun knows better and time and time again punishes him for his schemes.

When the rich Yam Shing-Tin (Oscar Leung), comes into town, Wing-Ching tricks him into believing that he is indebted to him. The two become good friends and Shing-Tin makes Wing-Ching his right-hand man. Shing-Tin soon falls for a girl named Wong Kam-Fung (Vivien Yeo), and Wing-Ching is secretly behind the curtains, humorously coaching both of them. The two start out pretending that they like each other in order to get back at the other person, but then they realize that they may have actually fallen in love with each other.

Meanwhile, Yeuk-Lam mistakes Wing-Ching for his father, believing that Wing-Ching is her senior apprentice. She finds herself slowly remembering her old life. Her memory is gradually restored, especially by the reappearance of Yam Fei-Yeung, Shing-Tin's father, who is actually Yeuk-Lam's second apprentice. One night, in an attempt to make her remember her old life, Wing-Ching pretends to be executed and brings back Yeuk-Lam's memories. When she wakes up, she is confused because to her, Sheung-Chun is an evil person who killed her husband, while to everyone else who knows her, she is a kind lady who works hard for her family. Yeuk-Lam decides to pretend she is still mental until she can uncover Sheung-Chun's true disposition.

Eventually, Wing-Ching, Sheung-Chun, and Kau-Miu discover that they were childhood friends during the time of the Qing Dynasty. The three make a heartfelt reunion and Wing-Ching begins to change for the better. Slowly, Wing-Ching and Sheung-Chun start to fall in love. Kau-Miu secretly harbors feelings for Sheung-Chun, but decides that he should be happy for her now that she has found her true love.

In the end, the true, nightmarish face of Yam Fei-Yeung is revealed. Together, the characters must stand together and they soon begin to truly understand the five flavors of life. The sweet, happy times, the sour and sad times, the bitter times, the spicy, exciting times, and the salty, difficult times.

== Cast ==
Lin family

Cast	Role	Description
Felix Lok	Lin Yee-Fat 連二發	Sheung-chun's father
Yvonne Lam	Lang Yue-Bing 冷如冰	Sheung-chun's stepmother.
Esther Kwan	Lin Sheung-chun' 連雙春	Restaurant owner. Ma Wing Ching's lover Cousins with Wong Kam Fung
Oscar Chan (陳堃)	Lin Yun-Yut 連潤月	Lin Sheung Chun's little stepbrother Cousins with Wong Kam Fung and adores her Lang Yue Bing's and Lin Yee Fat's son

Yam family

Cast	Role	Description
Lawrence Ng (伍衛國)	Yam Fei-Yeung 任飛揚	Kwan's husband Tin's father
Elena Kong	Tse Yuen-Kwan 謝婉君	Yeung's wife and Tin's mother.
Oscar Leung (梁烈唯)	Yam Shing-Tin 任勝天	Yeung's son. Wong Kam Fung's lover Ma Wing Ching's biological younger brother

Kwan family

Cast	Role	Description
Teresa Ha (夏萍)		Chiu Sing's mother
Peter Lai (黎彼得)	Kwan Chiu-Yan 關照仁	
Leung Kin Ping (關照義)	Kwan Chiu-Yi 關照義	
Savio Tsang (曾偉權)	Kwan Chiu-Sing 關照星	Wang Yeuk Lam and Lin Sheung Chun's husband
Michelle Yim	Wang Yeuk-Lam 汪若嵐	Kwan Chiu Sing's first wife After losing memory, Lin Sheung-chun daughter
Esther Kwan	Lin Sheung-Chun 連雙春	Kwan Chiu Sing's second wife Ma Wing Ching's lover Cousins with Wong Kam Fung
Ngo Ka-nin	Kwan Cheat-yim 關哲嚴	

Other cast

Cast	Role	Description
Roger Kwok	Ma Wing-ching 馬永禎	Con artist. Lin Sheung Chun's lover Tai Kat's master Yam Sing Tin's biological brother
Derek Kok	Leung Kau-mui 梁九妹	Qing dynasty's last eunuch. Admires Lin Sheung Chun
Vivien Yeo	Wong Kam-fung 王金鳳	Yut and Chun's cousin Yam Shing Tin's lover
Mimi Lo	Law Man-tai 羅曼娣	Yam Fei Yeung's assistant and lover
Regen Cheung	Tai Kat 戴吉	Wing-ching's apprentice.
Irene Wong (汪琳)		
Lily Li		
Lo Mang	Shing-tin's bodyguard	

== Viewership ratings ==
	Week	Episodes	Average Points	Peaking Points	References
1	January 11 – 15, 2010	1 — 5	28	—	
2	January 18 – 22, 2010	6 — 10	28	30	
3	January 25 – 29, 2010	11 — 15	27	—	
4	February 1 – 5, 2010	16 — 20	26	—	
5	February 8 – 12, 2010	21 — 25	26	—	

== Awards and nominations ==
TVB Anniversary Awards (2010)

- Nominated: Best Drama
- Nominated: Best Actor (Roger Kwok)
- Nominated: Best Actress (Michelle Yim)
