= Ambition (TV series) =

Hong Kong television series

- DVD cover
- 孽吻
- Genre: Thriller
- Screenplay by: So Chi-sing
- Starring: Gallen Lo; Amy Kwok; Michael Tao; Wong Wai
- Theme music composer: Kong Kong-sang
- Opening theme: Don't Know How to Forgive You (不懂得原諒你) by Sammi Cheng
- Ending theme: Love You or Forget You (愛你還是忘記你) by Sammi Cheng
- Composer: Kong Kong-sang
- Country of origin: Hong Kong
- Original language: Cantonese
- No. of episodes: 20

Production
- Producer: Poon Ka-tak
- Production locations: Hong Kong; Macau
- Production company: TVB

Original release
- Network: TVB Jade
- Release: 8 July – 2 August 1996

Ambition
- Title screen shot
- Traditional Chinese: 孽吻
- Simplified Chinese: 孽吻
- Literal meaning: "Sinful Kiss"
Transcriptions
Standard Mandarin
- Hanyu Pinyin: Niè Wěn
Yue: Cantonese
- Jyutping: Jip6 Man2

Ambition is a Hong Kong thriller television series produced by TVB and starring Gallen Lo, Amy Kwok, Michael Tao and Wong Wai. The series was released overseas in 1993 before airing locally on TVB Jade in 1996.

== Plot ==
Cheung Man-wai (Gallen Lo) is an outstanding student of the Hong Kong University who conceals the fact that his mother is a madam of a brothel and dreams of prospering in life. Due to his personality, Kwok Ka-bo (Michael Tao) is Man-wai's only friend and confidant. The ambitious Man-wai is bent on putting himself under the patronage of a bigwig and marries Lily Cheung (Noel Leung), daughter of wealthy tycoon Cheung Yiu-tung (Wong Wai). Man-wai murders his girlfriend, Law Siu-fong (Cheung Man-sui), and in a deliberate arrangement, wins Lily's heart. At this time, however, Man-wai discovers that Liy is Yiu-tung's adopted child and has a poor relationship with her father and thus, Man-wai wants to break up with Lily. However, Lily discovers that she is pregnant with Man-wai's child and is unwilling to break up. Under the guise of marrying with Lily, Man-wai sets up a plan to murder Lily while arranging an illusion that Lily committed suicide.

By chance, Man-wai meets Yiu-tung's second daughter Joe Chueng (Amy Kwok). Man-wai manages to tame Joe, who is unruly in nature. When Man-wai and Joe were about to get married, Joe finds the cause of Lily's death suspicious and starts investigating about it. Due to his relationship with Joe, Man-wai was able to destroy all evidence one at a time. However, Joe eventually finds out the truth in unexpected situations. Man-wai discovers this in time to destroy to final evidence and strangles Joe into a coma.

Once again losing another opportunity, Man-wai discovers that Yiu-ting's eldest daughter and Joe's twin sister, Cheung Kiu (also portrayed by Amy Kwok), is the only one who can make his dreams come true. However, Kiu and Ka-bo fall in love with each other and becomes engaged. At this time, Ka-bo finds some clues that leads him to suspect Man-wai. Ka-bo uses strategies to make Man-wai speak the truth, but was shot and killed by Man-wai afterwards.

Losing the love of her life, Kiu is moved by Man-wai during this helpless occasion. Originally using Kiu for his schemes, Man-wai begins to wonder whether he have genuinely fallen in love with Kiu. At this time, Kiu also stumbles upon a tape recorder from Ka-bo's possessions and finally discovers Man-wai's true colors. However, Man-wai destroys this piece of evidence. Eventually, Kiu poses as her twin sister Joe and Man-wai finally speaks out the truth. After the truth came to light, Man-wai kidnaps Kiu and reveals to her his unfortunate childhood and the truth of the murders he committed. Man-wai was eventually shot to death by the police during a chase.

In Joe's ward, Kiu talks about Man-wai's misfortune with her parents and suddenly, the coma-ridden Joe sheds a tear.

== Cast ==
=== The Cheung (張) family ===
- Tomi Wong as Hui Yuk-ha (許玉霞), Man-wai's mother who is a madam of a brothel and later becomes a restaurant owner.
- Gallen Lo as Cheung Man-wai (張文偉), a student at the University of Hong Kong and a bank employee before being employed in the Cheung Corporation. In order to move up at the social ladder, he uses and murders his ex-girlfriends Law Siu-fong and Lily Cheung and also murders Wong Ha-pak, Chan Sing, So Mau and his best friend, Kwok Ka-bo, to cover up his crimes. He also uses and attempts to murder Joe Cheung and was eventually shot to death by the police in the final episode.

=== The Cheung (蔣) family ===
- Wong Wai as Cheung Yiu-tung (蔣耀東), chairman of the Cheung Corporation, father of Cheung Kiu and Joe Cheung and adopted father of Lily Cheung.
- Pak Yan as Chui Suk-ching (崔淑貞), Cheung Yiu-tung's wife and mother of Kiu, Joe and Lei. During her youth, Suk-ching had an affair with Chan Sing to retaliate against Yiu-tung, which resulted the birth of Lily.
- Florence Kwok as Irene Poon, Cheung Yiu-tung's secretary and mistress.
- Chiu Hung as Chan Sing (陳勝), former driver for the Cheung family who is also Lily's biological father. He was stabbed to death by Cheung Man-wai in episode 7 after attempting to extort money from Cheung.
- Amy Kwok as Cheung Kiu (蔣喬), the elder daughter of Yiu-tung and Suk-ching and older twin-sister of Joe, and also Lily's older half-sister. Kiu is originally a lawyer who later becomes a senior executive in the Cheung Corporation. She was later involved in a sexual relationship with Kwok Ka-bo one night and they were eventually engaged to one another. When Kiu discovers the murders committed by Man-wai, she fakes her own death and comes back to pose as her twin sister which forces Man-wai to speak out the truth.
  - also portrays Joe Cheung (蔣瑩), Kiu's younger twin sister and Lily's older half-sister. Kiu was used by Cheung Man-wai and when she discovers he was the murderer of Lily, Joe becomes a vegetarian after being strangled by Man-wai. Joe wakes up from her comas in the final episode.
- Noel Leung as Lily Cheung (蔣莉), a college student who is Suk-ching's illegitimate daughter and Yiu-tung's adopted daughter. She was used by Man-wai to get close to her father and was killed after Man-wai pushes her off a building when he found out she is Yiu-tung's adopted daughter.
- Lai Sau-ying as Sister Choi (彩姐), the Cheung family's maid.
- Lai Huen as Leung Cham (梁杉), the wet nurse for Kiu, Joe and Lei, whom Man-wai attempted to murder through bribing.

=== The Kwok family ===
- Lam Seung-mo as Kwok Hing-chueng (郭祥興), father of Kwok Ka-bo, husband of Ng Kwan-ngo and Yu Ha's love rival.
- Ceci So as Ng Kwan-ngo (吳群娥), mother of Kwok Ka-bo, wife of Kwok Hing-chueng and Yu Ha's ex-lover.
- Michael Tao as Kwok Ka-bo (郭家寶), a police inspector who is Man-wai's best friend. He was later involved in a sexual relationship with Cheung Kiu one night and he eventually proposes to her and become engaged to her. Ka-bo eventually starts to suspect Man-wai for murder and after Man-wai confesses his crime to him, he was shot repeatedly by Man-wai, and dies from his injuries in episode 18.

=== Other cast ===
- Lau Kong as Yu Ha (余蝦), a police officer under Kwok Ka-bo who also owns a restaurant with his friend Yuk-ha. He is Ng Kwan-ngo's ex-lover who Hing-cheung despises. Ha is also a victim of one of Man-wai's murder attempts.
- Lai Hoi-san as Sze-to Kam-yu (司徒錦如), a police officer who is a subordinate of Kwok Ka-bo, whom she has a crush on. She is also a victim of one of Man-wai's murder attempts.
- Cheung Man-sui as Law Siu-fong (羅小方), Man-wai's ex-girlfriend whom was also used by him. Siu-fong was suffocated in coma by Man-wai, where he mistakenly thought to have killer her. When she awoken from her coma, Man-wai once again suffocates her and she dies.
- Wong Kai-tak as Wong Ha-pak (王夏柏), Lily's ex-boyfriend whom was framed by Man-wai to get close to Lily and was imprisoned as a result. When he discovers Man-wai to be Lily's murderer, he falls to his death during a scuffle with Man-wai, who survived the fall in episode 9.
- Gordon Lam as a bank employee who is Man-wai's former colleague.
- Tong Chong-na as May, Kitty Lau as Siu-kuen (小娟) and Lily Liu as Chun (阿珍), prostitutes who work under Yuk-ha whom become staffs at Yuk-ha's restaurant later.
- Yau Piu, Lo Wai and Cheung Kwan-ning as CID officers
- Cheung Hoi-kan as a uniformed officer
- Mak Ho-wai as Superintendent Sir (唐Sir)
- So Yuk-ying as a secretary.
- Chan Min-leung as So Mau (蘇貓), a drug addict and brothel frequenter who was bribed by Man-wai to murder Leung Cham, which he did not commit. He was later stabbed to death by Man-wai.

== See also ==
- List of TVB series (1996)
