= HotCha =

Hong Kong Cantopop trio

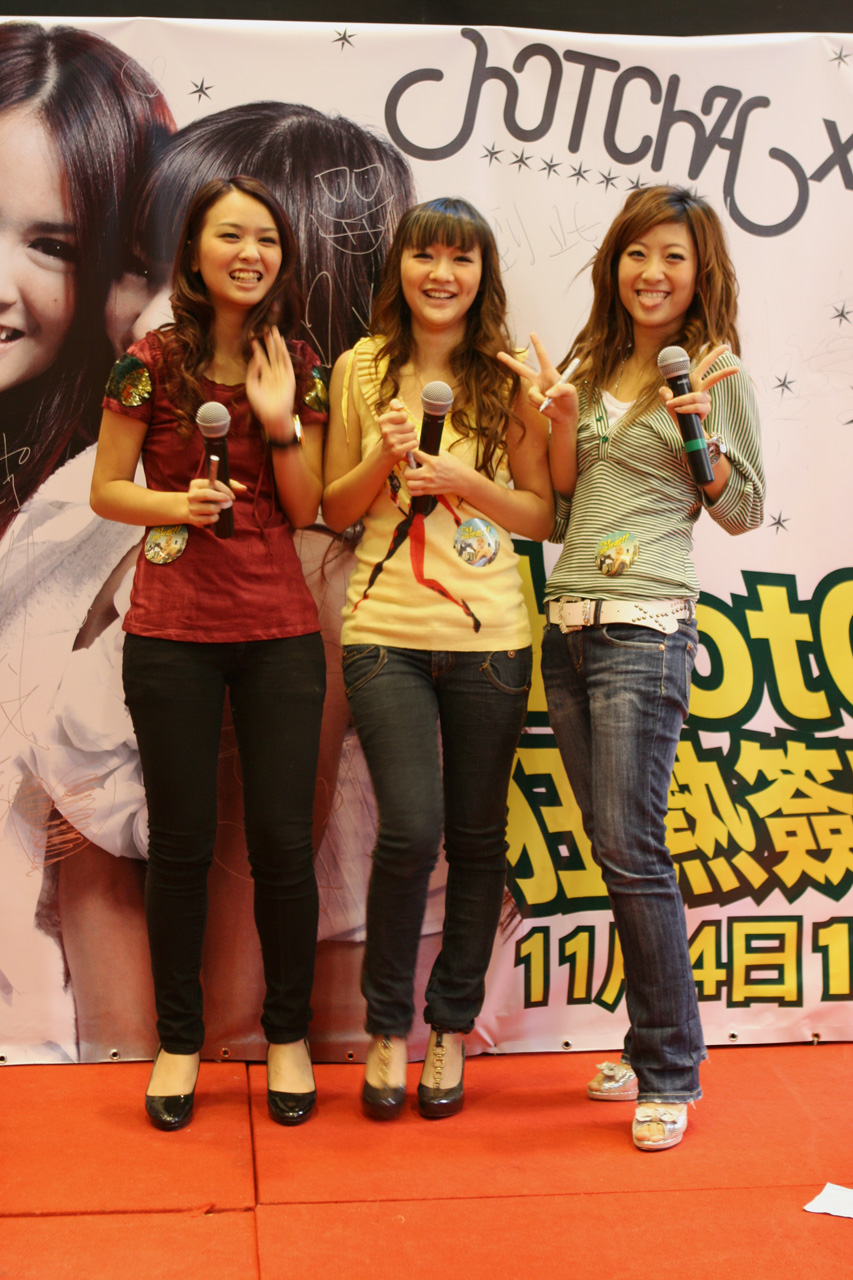
- HotCha in November 2007; From left to right: Crystal Cheung, Regen Cheung, Winkie Lai

Background information
- Origin: Hong Kong
- Genres: Cantopop
- Years active: 2007–2014, 2018
- Labels: Neway Star Entertainment
- Past members: Regen Cheung (張惠雅); Crystal Cheung (張紋嘉); Winkie Lai (黎美言)
- Website: Newaystar

HotCha is a former Hong Kong cantopop trio group presented by Neway Star Entertainment. The members include Regen Cheung (張惠雅), Crystal Cheung (張紋嘉), and Winkie Lai (黎美言). The group debuted on April 4, 2007 and disbanded in 2014.

In 2018, the 11th year of the group's career, the three former members reunited for a special charity concert, which was held on June 3, in order to commemorate the group's 10th anniversary.

== Albums ==
- Hotcha (2007)
- Hotcha Sexy Funny Cool (2008)
- Hotcha Shall We Dance Shall We Love? (2009)
- Hotcha Our Favorites 我們最愛的 (2010)
- Three On The Road 3個人在途上(2011)
- 0103(2012)
- New Chapter Ultimate Collection (2014)

== TVB Series ==
- Colours of Love (森之愛情) (2007) HotCha as shopping assistants
- Dressage To Win (盛裝舞步愛作戰) (2008) Guest role
- Your Class or Mine (尖子攻略) (2008) Cameo role
- The Season of Fate (五味人生) (2010) Regen Cheung as Lei Shi-mui/Tai Kat, a swindler's apprentice
- Sisters of Pearl (掌上明珠) (2010) Crystal Cheung as Young Chu Pik-Ha

== Films ==
- Mysterious Fighter Project A (2018)
- Fortune Cookies (2012)
- The Cases (2012)
- Give Love (2009)
- All's Well, Ends Well 2009 (2009)
- Nobody's Perfect (2008)
- Forgive and Forget (2008)
