= A Recipe for the Heart =

Hong Kong television series

- Promo poster
- Also known as: King of Delicious Taste
- 美味天王
- Genre: Drama, Comedy, Romance, Food
- Written by: Ngau Gun Yin, Wong Wai Keung, Leung Min-ma, Cheung Jung Chai
- Directed by: Wong Kwok-fai, Lai Pui Yan, Lei Suk Man, Jau Pui Ha
- Starring: Bobby Au-yeung; Lydia Shum; Esther Kwan; Paul Chun; Louis Koo; Maggie Cheung Ho-Yee; Jessica Hsuan; Cheung Tat-ming
- Opening theme: Mamma Mia by Bobby Au-yeung, Maggie Cheung Ho-yee, Paul Chun, Jessica Hsuan, Esther Kwan, Lydia Shum
- Country of origin: Hong Kong
- Original language: Cantonese
- No. of episodes: 29

Production
- Producer: Tommy Leung
- Editor: Ngau Gun Yin
- Running time: 45 minutes

Original release
- Network: TVB Jade
- Release: 10 November – 20 December 1997

A Recipe for the Heart
- Chinese: 美味天王
- Simplified Chinese: 美味天王
- Literal meaning: "King of Delicious Taste"
Transcriptions
Standard Mandarin
- Hanyu Pinyin: Mei5 Mei6 Tin1 Wong4
Yue: Cantonese
- Jyutping: Měi wèi tiān wáng

A Recipe for the Heart (Chinese: 美味天王 jyutping: Mei5 Mei6 Tin1 Wong4, pinyin: Měi Wèi Tiān Wáng) is a 1997 TVB comedy drama with a food theme. Produced by Tommy Leung, it stars Bobby Au-yeung, Esther Kwan, Lydia Shum, Paul Chun, Louis Koo, Maggie Cheung Ho-Yee and Jessica Hsuan as the main cast. The drama is TVB's 30th anniversary drama. Multiple TVB's lead actors and actresses also have cameos in the drama. Original broadcast began on November 10 till December 20, 1997, on TVB Jade channel airing weekdays during the 7:30 to 8:30 pm timeslot.

In 2005, the series aired repeated episodes throughout Monday to Friday at 10:45 to 11:45 am.

== Synopsis ==
Kam Yat-san (Bobby Au-yeung) is in a heated cooking competition with master chef Chun Man-sek (Paul Chun). Right before the competition is judged Yat-san accidentally sneezes peppers on to Man-sek dish. When the judges comments that Man-sek dish tastes weird because it has an overpowering pepper taste and announces Yat-san the winner, Yat-san realizes the contest was not judged fairly because of his sneezed the pepper to Man-sek's dish. Man-sek goes insane after losing the competition, disappears and is never heard of again. Three years later Yat-san arrives under the alias Tin Mei-gut at Man-sek's restaurant "Delicious Garden" to atone for his guilt of what happened. Man-sek's restaurant is currently run by his daughter Chun So-so (Esther Kwan), who is also the current head chef. it is failing restaurant because So-so is a terrible cook. Yat-san now as Mei-gut offers to buy 51% stake of the restaurant and teach So-so how to cook. So-so and her mother Tong Yuen-yuen (Lydia Shum) thinks Mei-gut has ulterior motives but takes his offer anyway since it such a good deal for them.

== Cast ==
=== Main cast ===
- Bobby Au-yeung as Kam Yat-san (金一山), Tin Mei-gut (田味吉), Tin Mei-chang (田味橙)

A master chef who won the title unfairly against Chun Man-sek. Uses the alias of Tin Mei-gut to mentor Chun So-so and becomes 51% owner of "Delicious Garden" restaurant.

- Esther Kwan as Chun So-so (秦蘇蘇)

Chun Man-sek and Tong Yuen-yuen's daughter. A terrible cook who is trying her best to save her father's "Delicious Garden" restaurant from going out of business.

- Paul Chun as Chun Man-sek (秦萬石)

Former master chef and owner of "Delicious Garden" restaurant. He goes insane and loses his memory after losing an unfairly judged cooking competition to Kam Yat-san.

- Lydia Shum as Tong Yuen-yuen (湯圓圓)

Chun Man-sek's wife and Chun So-so's mother. She manages the dining area of the "Delicious Garden" restaurant. She blames Tin Mei-gut for what happened to her husband.

- Louis Koo as Kiu Pak-ko (喬柏高)

A up and coming master chef at "Delicious Garden" rivaled restaurant. Ha Jut-jut had initially thought he was Kam Yat-san because he is able to cook a dish like Yat-san.

- Maggie Cheung Ho-Yee as Ha Jut-jut (夏津津)

A food critic who is a foodie. She gave "Delicious Garden" a bad review because of So-so's terrible cooking, She later develops a crush on Kiu Pak-ko.

== Supporting cast ==
- John Tang as Lam Siu-ding (林小丁)

Kam Yat-san's pupil and assistant cook.

- Jessica Hsuan as Leung Song-song (梁爽爽)

Tin Mei-gut's former cooking classmate who has a huge crush on him

- Cheung Tat-ming as Ho B-jai (何B仔)

Tin Mei-gut's and Leung Song-song's cooking mentor.

- Jerry Lamb as Ho Siu-king (何小勁)

Kiu Pak-ko assistant cook.

- Chor Yuen as Yu Yau-bo (余有寶)

Owner of "Delicious Garden" rivaled restaurant and Kiu Pak-ko boss.

- Alice Fung So-bor as Wong Kuen-kuen (王娟娟)

Yu Yau-bo's wife.

- Angel Sung as Kei Lim-lim (紀廉廉)

A waitress at "Delicious Garden". Both Siu-ding and Siu-king are rivals for her affection.

- Kwan Hoi-san as Keung Yin (姜研)

The cooking competition judge.

== Guest appearances ==
- Danny Summer as Wu Tin-chak (胡天擇)
- Bowie Wu as Wu Sau-sau (胡修修)
- Nancy Sit Yin Jan Jan (燕珍珍)
- Florence Kwok as Fa Yung-yung (花蓉蓉)
- Lo Mang as Chu Dai-hung (朱大雄)
- Monica Chan as Fanny
- Sunny Chan as Doctor Wong Luk (黃綠醫生)
- Deno Cheung as a worker
- Nick Cheung as Ah Fai (亞輝) - Pak Ko's junior
- Peter Lai (Chinese: 黎彼得; Lai Bei-Dak) as a swindler
- Lai Suen as a deaf woman
- Wayne Lai as Dai Se Chun (大蛇春) / Chun Gor (春哥)
- Bowie Lam as Chan Fun Hei (陳歡喜)
- Gordon Lam as Ho Kai (浩佳)
- Law Kar-ying as Cheung Tin Sang (蔣天生)
- Gallen Lo as Sui Hau Lo (水喉佬)
- Lau Dan as Lam Kam Sing (林金成)
- Joey Leung
- Celine Ma as Bo Choi Lin (菠菜蓮)
- Mak Cheung-ching as a robber
- Miriam Yeung as Yau Ka Ka (尤嘉嘉)
- Carlo Ng as Ah Sui (亞水)
- Ram Chiang as Lee Tim Fuk (李添福)
- Yu Tze-ming as Pang Tung (彭東)
