= The Greed of Man =

Hong Kong television series

- Official Poster
- 大時代
- Genre: Financial thriller Drama
- Created by: Wai Ka-fai
- Screenplay by: Kwan Ching-man; Chan Po-yin; Ng Lap-kwong; Fong Sai-keung; Cheung Lei-lei; Chan Po-wah; Lung Man-hong; Cheung Po-yin; Kwan Ching-wan
- Directed by: Yuen Ying-ming; Yau Nam-lung; Lau Chun-ming; Wong Chun-man; Lam Kin-lung; Fung Pak-yuen; Lin Chi-fan
- Starring: Adam Cheng; Sean Lau; Yammie Lam; Vivian Chow; Amy Kwok; Bowie Lam; Loletta Lee; David Siu; Damian Lau; Michael Tao; Kenneth Tsang
- Opening theme: Sui Yuet Mou Ching (歲月無情; 'Ruthless Life') performed by Adam Cheng
- Country of origin: Hong Kong
- Original language: Cantonese
- No. of episodes: 40

Production
- Producer: Wai Ka-fai
- Running time: 45 minutes each episode

Original release
- Network: TVB Jade
- Release: 5 October – 27 November 1992

The Greed of Man
- Traditional Chinese: 大時代
- Simplified Chinese: 大时代
- Literal meaning: The Great Times
Transcriptions
Standard Mandarin
- Hanyu Pinyin: Dà Shí Dài
Yue: Cantonese
- Jyutping: Daai6 Si4 Doi6

The Greed of Man is a Hong Kong television series first broadcast on TVB Jade in 1992. The story, spanning three decades from the 1970s to the 1990s in Hong Kong and Taiwan, addresses various social and financial phenomena of the times, from triad violence to corruption in the Hong Kong Stock Exchange. It featured a top roster cast, including veteran TVB actors Adam Cheng and Damian Lau and award-winning actor Sean Lau. The series is also well remembered for a Hong Kong stock market cultural phenomenon called the "Ting Hai effect". In 2022, the drama was selected as one of ten classic TVB dramas being honoured for a new Youku and TVB programme.

== Plot ==
This is the first modern-age TV drama in Hong Kong history, where the story is told in reverse chronological order In medias res. The story starts at present time (in reality, the future: 7 June 1994), where The Day of Big Miracle happened, where the stock market rebounded after the market became volatile and crashed for the weekend. After the stock market stopped trading for the weekend, the Tings make the wrong bet and their entire fortune is wiped out, compounded by ending up in billions of dollars in debt. Ting Hai forces his sons to commit suicide by jumping off from the top of the stock exchange building before following suit himself, at the beginning, Ting Hai's fate was unknown.

=== 1960-1970s ===
Ting Hai and Fong Chun-sun were childhood friends. Ting is a stubborn, uneducated and pathologically self-righteous brute who imagines himself to be a living kong-woo hero, while Fong is an honest, cultured and refined leader of the Asian Stock Exchange. Fong is pressured by some of the most powerful and corrupt bureaucrats in Hong Kong to control the stock market. Immigration officers, police chiefs and government officials all attempt to cash in. Fong manipulates the market such that no one could touch him. The stock guru Yip Tin describes the event as a battle to seize control of the "Mandate of Heaven".

Fong develops strong feelings for Ting's girlfriend Lo Wei-ling, and becomes Ting's rival for her affection. In a fit of fury over Lo's disaffection, Ting cripples Fong, and later, during an ill-advised attempt at reconciliation, kills him. Without Fong's moderating influence, the 1973 stock market crash forces many people into extreme poverty, including Fong and his family. Stock manipulation is one justification for the creation of the Hong Kong Independent Commission Against Corruption (ICAC) in February 1974.

=== 1980s ===
Ting Hai flees to Taiwan, where his unabatedly violent behaviour lands him a 14-year prison sentence. Back in Hong Kong, Ting's four sons manage to build a powerful triad in their father's absence. The four brothers blame the Fong family for separating them from their father, and they harass them unrelentingly. The eldest son, Ting How-hai, replays his father's relationship with Lo Wei-ling on one of the Fong sisters, and is driven to violence when she rejects him. Ting Hai returns to Hong Kong and is convicted of murder, but is pardoned using a forged certification of terminal illness. All of Fong Chun-sun's three daughters are brutally killed, while Fong's only son, Fong Chin-bok, manages to survive and escape to Taiwan. With help from his two girlfriends, Fong strikes a fortune by gambling on the stock market (not by investing, but via an indirect gambling method) and returns to Hong Kong to avenge his family. At the same time, the Ting family's wealth and power have increased to incredible proportions via the stock market due to sheer luck in the 1987 bear market.

=== 1990s ===
The final showdown between the Tings and Fongs is inspired by the backdrop of a war in the Middle East in 1994. Fong Chin-bok's investment company faces the Ting family in a winner-takes-all, last-man-standing stock market epic battle. To raise the stakes, the Tings are financed by international criminal syndicates. Fong wins the support of three of Hong Kong's wealthiest tycoons, who want to return the favour as they built their financial empires with help from Fong's father back in the 1960s. The stock market rises and falls correspondingly with news of American forces entering or withdrawing from the war. Eventually, the Tings make the wrong bet and their entire fortune is wiped out, compounded by ending up in billions of dollars in debt. Ting Hai forces his sons to commit suicide by jumping off from the top of the stock exchange building before following suit himself, but he survives and spends the rest of his life in prison.

== Cast ==
=== Ting family ===
Cast	Role	Description
Lai Hyun	Ho Chin 何賤	Ting Hai's mother. She is old and has health problems. As she was the wet nurse for the Fong family, she always sees the Fongs as her extended family, despite the rivalry between the two families.
Adam Cheng	Ting Hai 丁蟹	Used to have a net worth of HKD$5 billion through catering, entertainment, stock and property speculation and ended up with debts double of his fortune after making the wrong bet in episode 40. A stubborn, uneducated and pathologically self-righteous brute who solves his problems through violence and intimidation. He is not exactly intelligent, but has amazing streaks of luck. He pushed his four sons off the stock exchange building in the last episode, a scene also shown in media res at the first episode. He and his family became rich after reaping in profits of HKD$2 billion speculating in Futures contracts during the Black Monday (1987) stock market crisis and over the next 7 years until 1994, they were also involved in money laundering for drug lords in numerous countries leading to a HKD$5 billion fortune.
David Siu	Ting How-hai 丁孝蟹	First son of Ting Hai and the boss of the Ting family triad. He is considered to be the most compassionate of Ting Hai's sons. He becomes cold and ruthless later. The character is based on Crying Freeman.
Michael Tao	Ting Yik-hai 丁益蟹	Second son of Ting Hai, who's cruel, vulgar, lascivious and unforgiving triad member.
Ng Kai-ming	Ting Wong-hai 丁旺蟹	Third son of Ting Hai. A smart but corrupted lawyer who spends his time making money through unscrupulous means.
Derek Kok	Ting Lei-hai 丁利蟹	Fourth son of Ting Hai, and an unethical doctor.

Ho Chin
Ting Hai
Ting How-hai	Ting Yik-hai	Ting Wong-hai	Ting Lei-hai

=== Fong family ===
Cast	Role	Description
Damian Lau	Fong Chun-sun 方進新	A premiere stockbroker who attempts to rid the stock market of corruption. His first wife is killed by a car driven in the wrong direction near a supermarket. He raises his four children with the help of Ting Hai's mother.
Yammie Lam	Lo Wai-ling 羅慧玲	Ting Hai's ex-girlfriend. She seeks protection from Fong Chun-sun after discovering Ting's brutal ways. She helps Fong raise his children like a stepmother, even though she is only a few years older than them. She is driven insane eventually after witnessing the destruction of her family at the hands of the Tings.
Sean Lau	Fong Chin-bok 方展博	Fong Chun-sun's only son. He enjoyed a privileged childhood when his father started off a wealthy man. However, he falls into despair and idleness after his father's death and his family's descent into poverty. When he returns to financial stability, he becomes an aggressive stock holder and vows to avenge his family.
Ng Wing-hung	Fong Fong 方芳	Fong Chun-sun's eldest daughter. She is emotional but clear-minded. She is the most "ordinary" of the Fong siblings, but is overwhelmed by events beyond her control.
Loletta Lee	Fong Ting 方婷	She is beautiful and intelligent enough to earn a good life for herself. Unfortunately, she falls in love with Ting How-hai, the son of her father's murderer and a triad boss. She realises her mistake and tries to end her relationship with Ting, but is unable to escape the disastrous consequences.
Carol Yeung	Fong Man 方敏	The youngest of the Fong siblings. She is the brightest and most innocent of the four. She commits suicide by jumping off a building after being raped by Ting Yik-hai, who promptly had the incident publicised.

		Fong Chun-sun	Lo Wai-ling
Fong Chin-bok	Fong Fong		Fong Ting	Fong Man

=== Others ===
Cast	Role	Relations	Description
Vivian Chow	Yuen Mui 阮梅	Fong Chin-bok's love interest	She is a neighbour of the Fongs and witnesses their joys and tribulations. She is sweet, down-to-earth, pure and faithful, but extremely frugal in spending, but it was revealed that she did it all for her medical costs as she and her family suffered from congenital and hereditary heart problems. Her frugal ways is based on the drama's script writer.
Amy Kwok	Lung Kei-man 龍紀文	Fong Chin-bok's love interest; Lung Sing-bong's daughter	She meets Fong by chance and fall in love with him. She is emotional, impulsive, educated and smart. She is a clear contrast to Yuen Mui, her opponent in the love triangle, until she left him after assuming he killed his father.
Kenneth Tsang	Lung Sing-bong 龍成邦	Lung family patriarch	A corrupt sergeant-major in the Royal Hong Kong Police Force, who once had a net worth of HKD$400 million. He flees to Taiwan in 1973 to escape from Hong Kong stock market corruption charges. He died from a heart attack on 'Miracle Day' (7 June 1994) knowing the stock spiked up when he helped Fong to sell all his stocks, to Yuen Mui and Fong Chin-bok's excitement. The character is based on the life of Lui Lok.
Kong Ngai	Chan Man-yin 陳萬賢	Chan To-to's father	Used to have a net worth of HKD$2 billion before ending up with debts worth billions and hanged himself in Stanley Prison on "Miracle Day" (7 June 1994). Founding leader of the Asian Stock Exchange, who is utterly corrupt and ruthless. He has good stock instincts but not skilled or lucky enough to compete with the Fong and Ting families.
Bowie Lam	Chan To-to 陳滔滔	Chan Man-yin's illegitimate son	A stock market expert who unseats his father from the stock exchange leading position. He leaves New York and returns to Hong Kong after the Fong family is murdered and swears vengeance.
Law Lok-lam	Yip Tin 葉天	Fong family friend	An honest stock market guru, who fantasizes about being the god of Wall Street. He is the right-hand man of Fong Chun-sun during the 1960s and becomes the mentor of Fong's son in the 1980s. He has the right formula to winning the stock market, but is mentally unstable.
Lau Kong	Chow Chai-sang 周濟生	Lung Sing-bong's old close ally	Used to have a net worth of HKD$300 million before being assassinated by gangsters on "Miracle Day" (7 June 1994) in Taiwan. A drug cartel chief and highly respected elder of the triad community. He escapes to Taiwan together with Lung and falls from power. He has an unusual penchant for Hangzhou cuisine. The character is based on the life of Ng Sik-ho.

== Reception ==
The first episode of The Greed of Man starts in medias res with Ting Hai hurling his four adult sons from the top of the stock exchange building after losing his fortunes in the stock market. Upon the show's initial run in 1992, the audience found the scene so disturbing that the resulting torrent of complaints forced TVB to make several adjustments to the programme. The drama was moved from the 7 o'clock timeslot to the 9 o'clock timeslot after the first week of airing, and several sensitive scenes were cut. Scenes that have been edited out include Ting Hai trying to wash blood off his hands with his own urine, the rape and suicide of Fong Man, and the triads throwing the remnants of the Fong family down from the roof. No domestic version, including later reruns and VHS and DVD releases, contains the full unedited The Greed of Man; however, the North American VHS version, being shipped before the programme was aired and edited in Hong Kong, is considered to be the complete uncut version.

The April 2015 rerun, aired after a massive spike in the Hang Seng Index, drew an average of 360,000 viewers, a record for late night television in Hong Kong. The controversial opening scene itself drew 410,000 viewers. Young viewers watching the classic soap opera for the first time dubbed it a "divine drama" (神劇, meaning a highly acclaimed drama) on social media. The rerun won the "Most Popular Classic Drama Serial" award in the 2015 TVB Anniversary Awards.

== Legacy ==
=== Ting Hai effect ===
The series, which centers on the bustling stock market during the early 1990s, has been studied by international stockbrokers for its peculiar effect on the global stock market trend. A phenomenon is observed, that whenever a television drama starring Adam Cheng, the actor for the character Ting Hai, is aired, the stock market will drop for unexplainable reasons. In 1992 when the series made its debut, the Hong Kong stock market dropped by 1200 points in one month. In 2009 when Cheng starred in The King of Snooker, the Hang Seng Index fell by 600 points again.

=== The actual "Day of Miracle" ===
Because the ending date of the drama was set in the future, in 1994, when it did happen, the stock market was also in the middle of a skid.

The "Days of Miracle" happened of sorts on 4 January 1994, Heng Seng Index closed on a then-historical high of 12,201, by 23 January, it fell to 6967.5, almost halving the value. On 7 June 1994, the day of the fictional miracle, Heng Seng Index closed at 9,247.9, down 135.1 from the Friday before (4 June, at 9,383).

=== Others ===
Sean Lau's character Fong Chin-bok was involved in a love triangle with Yuen Mui and Long Kei-man, played respectively by Vivian Chow and Amy Kwok. Fong married Yuen eventually in the series before she was presumed dead from her heart conditions, but in reality, Lau dated Kwok and married her in 1998, and they were encouraged by Chow to become a couple after the filming. Amy Kwok has not been acting since 2006.

Yammie Lam, who played Lo Wei-ling, became mentally unstable like her character in the series. The Hong Kong media has since speculated that she has been possessed and cannot get out of her role. In September 1998, Lam lost control of her car while driving at Repulse Bay, and was admitted into hospital. Her mental illness was announced in the following year. She alleged that she was sexually harassed by two renowned seniors in the industry, and was found dead on 3 November 2018, having died a few days prior from injuries incurred from slipping in the bathroom in her flat in Stanley, Hong Kong.

Future film director Derek Kwok was so inspired by a quote spoken by the actor Law Lok-lam in episode 8 that he quit his original job as a graphic designer and started to study screenwriting in order to become a director.

=== Sequel ===
In 2000, TVB's rival station ATV produced Divine Retribution, as a sequel to The Greed of Man. Both its Chinese and English titles, as well as its characters, were modified to avoid association with The Greed of Man. It was directed by Wai Ka-fai and featured Adam Cheng and Sean Lau.

== See also ==
- 1973–74 stock market crash
- Hang Seng Index
- The Wolf of Wall Street
- Wall Street (1987 film)
- Overheard (film)
