= Your Class or Mine =

- Official poster
- 尖子攻略
- Genre: Modern Drama
- Starring: Bobby Au Yeung; Sheren Tang; Derek Kok; Benz Hui; Him Law
- Opening theme: "好學為福" by Bobby Au Yeung, HotCha, Renee Dai, & Percy Fan
- Composer: Wong Jim
- Country of origin: Hong Kong
- Original language: Cantonese
- No. of episodes: 20

Production
- Running time: 45 minutes (approx.)

Original release
- Network: TVB
- Release: August 25 – September 19, 2008

Your Class or Mine (Traditional Chinese: 尖子攻略) is a TVB modern drama series broadcast in August 2008.

== Synopsis ==
Pang Kam-Chau (Bobby Au-Yeung) is left broke when his ex-girlfriend takes everything away from him. He hides in a football stadium to run away from the loan sharks. He then overhears Jason Ching Kwok-Chu (Derek Kok) discussing with a business partner on sponsoring the Keegan Spirit soccer team. Hearing this perfect opportunity to possibly regain his wealth, Chau befriends the team coach, Fan Dai-Wai (Benz Hui), and is given the title of Operation Director of the football team.

With the win in the second quarter, Chau approaches Jason and his business partner to sponsor the team, by promising to make the "three treasures" of the team, Lam Yik-Dan (Kelvin Leung), Chan Lik-Ban (Oscar Leung), and Fan Pui-Tung (Him Law) into academically fit players and bring the team to the A league. They agree to sponsor and with Jason's hidden relationship with Kelly Yim Ka-Lai (Sheren Tang), nicknamed "A+ tutor" of a HK cram school. Three soccer players were tutored for the upcoming national examination. Kelly later discovers the players were cheating on the exams, and she refuses to continue tutoring. Kelly was angry, but cannot back out. She later claim that the three players must achieve a grade of 20 points or Chau will have to resign from his post.

Chau and Kelly continued to have their differences, but always put the benefits of the three treasures in mind. One day an intimate photograph of Kelly and Jason was published in a magazine. Jason's father is outraged and demotes Jason, giving the responsibility of the soccer team to his younger brother, Benny Ching Kwok-Ho (Vincent Wong). Later their relationships are strained in a 3 way relationship. And the finale is settled in a soccer game.

== Cast ==
Cast	Role	Description
Bobby Au Yeung	Pang Kam-Chau 彭錦秋	Keegan Spirit Soccer Team Operation Director; Yim Ka-Lai's boyfriend. Fan Pui-Tung's brother
Sheren Tang	Yim Ka-Lai (Kelly) 嚴家勵, A神	Tutor; Pang Kam-Chau's girlfriend Yim Ka-Ming and Yim Ka-Lok's oldest sister Ching Kwok-Chu's ex-girlfriend
Benz Hui	Fan Dai-Wai 樊大偉	Keegan Spirit Soccer Team Coach; Fan Pui-Tung's father.
Derek Kok	Ching Kwok-Chu (Jason) 程國柱	Ching (程) Company's CEO; Ko Ah-Hin's husband Yim Ka-Lai's ex-boyfriend.
Him Law	Fan Pui-Tung 樊沛冬	Student/Keegan Spirit Soccer Teammate; Fan Dai-Wai's son. Pang Kam-Chau's little brother Yim Ka-Lok's boyfriend
Kelvin Leung (梁証嘉)	Lam Yik-Dan 林亦單	Student/Keegan Spirit Soccer Team Leader
Oscar Leung (梁烈唯)	Chan Lik-Ban 陳力奔	Student/Keegan Spirit Soccer Teammate
Benjamin Yuen	Lin Cheung-Shing 連長勝	Truck Driver/Keegan Spirit Soccer Team Goalie; Yim Ka-Ming's boyfriend.
Rabee'a Yeung (楊洛婷)	Yim Ka-Ming (Carmen) 嚴家明	Marketing Director; Yim Ka-Lai's younger sister. Yim Ka-Lok's older sister Lin Cheung-Sing's girlfriend.
Lee Yee Man (李綺雯)	Yim Ka-Lok (Carol) 嚴家樂	Student; Yim Ka-Lai and Yim Ka-Ming's younger sister Fan Pui-Dong's girlfriend
Mimi Lo (羅敏莊)	Ko Ah-Hin (Amanda) 高雅妍	Ching Kwok-Chu's wife.
Vincent Wong (王浩信)	Ching Kwok-Ho (Benny) 程國浩	Marketing Director; Ching Kwok-Chu's younger brother.
Law Lok Lam (羅樂林)	Ching Chun-Hing 程振興	Ching Kwok-Chu and Ching Kwok-Ho's father.
Kenneth Ma (cameo)	Sun Man-Kwan (MK) 辛萬軍	Lawyer; Note: Kenneth Ma guest star his role from Survivor's Law II.

== Viewership ratings ==
	Week	Episode	Average Points	Peaking Points	References
1	August 25–29, 2008	1 — 5	29	32	
2	September 1–5, 2008	6 — 10	30	35	
3	September 8–12, 2008	11 — 15	28	33	
4	September 15–19, 2008	16 — 20	31	—	

== Awards and nominations ==
41st TVB Anniversary Awards (2008)

- "Best Drama"
- "Best Actor in a Leading Role" Top 10 (Bobby Au-Yeung - Pang Kam-Chau)
- "Best Actress in a Leading Role" Top 10 (Sheren Tang - Kelly Yim Ka-Lai)
- "Best Actor in a Supporting Role" Top 5 (Him Law - Fan Pui-Tung)
