= Kong Ngai =

Hong Kong actor

- 江毅
- Born: Tang Siu Ji (鄧兆怡); October 1936; Zhongshan, Guangdong, Republic of China
- Died: 13 March 2013 (aged 76); Hong Kong
- Occupation: Actor
- Years active: 1974–2011
- Agents: TVB (1974–1997); aTV (1997–2009)

Kong Ngai (born Tang Siu Ji; October 1936 – 13 March 2013) was a Hong Kong actor with TVB and ATV.

== Early years ==
Born in China in 1936 as Tang Siu Ji, Kong's affluent family fled to Macau during World War II and later migrated to Hong Kong.

Before acting he was a stockbroker and a Cantonese opera singer.

== Acting career ==
Kong was hired by TVB in 1974 and stayed with the station until 1996. He moved onto rival ATV in 1997 and remained there until 2008. Kong was known to play mainly father figures in his television career. Kong starred in one last TV series with RTHK in 2009.

Kong's career spanned half a century with credits for 80 films and television series:

- Overheard 2 (film, 2011)
- Flaming Butterfly (ATV, 2008)
- Cross Border Daddy (ATV, 2004)
- The Condor Heroes 95 (TVB, 1995)
- Instinct (TVB, 1994)
- The Legend of the Condor Heroes (TVB, 1994)
- Top Cop (TVB, 1993)
- The Greed of Man (TVB, 1992)
- Man from Guangdong (TVB, 1991)
- The Smiling, Proud Wanderer (TVB, 1984)
- The Return of the Condor Heroes (TVB, 1983)
- Legend of the Condor Heroes (TVB, 1983)
- The Demi-Gods and Semi-Devils (TVB, 1982)

== Personal life ==
Kong was a lifelong bachelor and some speculation (though not proven) about why he was single as he commented that he wished to be a woman in his next life. Kong was a friend of late actors/singers Danny Chan and Leslie Cheung.

In March 2013, Kong died from lung cancer at Ruttonjee Hospital in Hong Kong.
