= Bar Bender =

2006 Hong Kong TV series

- Poster
- 潮爆大狀
- Genre: Legal drama
- Screenplay by: Yip Sai-hong
- Starring: Adam Cheng; Louisa So; Leila Tong; Sammul Chan; Anne Heung
- Opening theme: "身外物" by Adam Cheng
- Country of origin: Hong Kong
- Original language: Cantonese
- No. of episodes: 20

Production
- Producer: Terry Tong
- Running time: 45 minutes (approx.)
- Production company: TVB

Original release
- Network: TVB Jade
- Release: 3 April – 26 April 2006

Bar Bender (Chinese: 潮爆大狀) is a Hong Kong legal drama series produced by TVB and aired on its channel, Jade, from 3 to 26 April 2006.

== Overview ==
The series revolves around a fictional Hong Kong senior counsel named Tony Tseung (Adam Cheng). Senior Counsel Tseung is well known for winning 31 legal cases in a row, but is also notorious in legal circles for his unsavory (but ethical) tactics. He is also notorious for being retained as counsel by unscrupulous businessman Richard Ngai (Bill Chan). His focus on his legal career has also alienated family member and anyone romantically involved. His daughter, Stephanie Tseung (Leila Tong), particularly hates him for not only his modus operandi in legal battles (strike a victory on procedural errors, and not on evidence), but also on his neglect of family life.

All this changed when Tony was dealt a career blow by Richard. In an assault case involving Richard, Richard asked Tony's apprentice, Darren Li (Power Chan), to conspire in a conspiracy to bribe a witness and have him lie in court by professing amnesia. When Tony protested, Richard fired Tony, and cut off much of the businesses that came to his law firm. In the process, Tony lost his girlfriend, Sophie So (Anne Heung), to Richard. Tony drowned his sorrows in alcohol, and assaulted a foreigner at a bar. Tseung pleaded guilty to assault, and was sentenced to community service. That was where he began to rediscover the lost idealism and righteousness of his youth and met Chong Hiu-wai (Louisa So) who showed him there is more to life...

== List of court cases ==
=== Richard Ngai's Reckless Driving Case ===
Case Type: Criminal
Case Name: Government of Hong Kong v Richard Ngai
Charges: Violation of Road Traffic Ordinance #374 (reckless driving, hit and run, failure to report accident after its occurrence)
Verdict: Case Dismissed

The series began with Richard Ngai on a night out with a (fictional) prominent local actress, Kelly Wong. To evade the intruding cameras of entertainment reporters, Ngai sped away from the hotel, and hit a motorcyclist in the process. In a lawsuit, Senior Counsel Tony Chiang faced off against his daughter, Stephanie Chiang. Tony defeated the prosecution based on procedural faults. This is the 31st victory in a row for Tony.

=== Squatting Case ===
Case Type: Civil
Case Name: Richard Ngai, Estate Executor of Ngai Fat, v Mary Yu, Fong Gim-lam, Shum Wing-lui, and Kin Mei-guk
Plaintiff Counsel: Senior Counsel Tony Tseung
Defendant Counsel: Barrister Ching Ji-kit (contracted by the Hong Kong Legal Aid Department)
Verdict: For the Plaintiff

The case was originally thought to be leak-proof for the defendants, for local real estate laws stipulate that any person who lives in a residence for more than 12 years without the original property owner exercising ownership rights will, in effect, own the property in question. However, Tony Tseung found some devastating evidence that implicated a tacit, unwritten, and unknown agreement between the late Ngai Fat and Mary Yu, which proved that Ngai Fat exercised ownership rights and held an "unusual relationship" (term used by Tony to avoid libel charges) with Mary Yu. This effectively sank the defendant, and allowed Richard Ngai to evict the foursome. This also marked the 32nd-straight victory for Tony.

=== Lam Ka-Shun's Police Assault Case ===
Case Type: Criminal
Prosecution: Government of Hong Kong v Lam Ka-shun
Charges: Hong Kong Ordinance Cap 212 s 36 (assault with intent to commit offence, or on police officer, etc.)
Plea: Not Guilty on all charges
Prosecution Counsel: Unknown
Defendant Counsel: Lam Ka-shun (defending self)
Verdict- Guilty, Lam Ka-shun appeals, and released on HKD10,000 bail.

Lam Ka-shun, an uneducated courier without any legal education, defended himself in court, and was found guilty of assaulting a police officer. Lam Ka-shun proclaimed in court that he will appeal the ruling, and was released on $10,000 bail. Lam was also advised by the judge to retain a barrister during the appear phase.

Re-Appeal
Plea: N/A, case in appeal
Prosecution Counsel: Unnamed female barrister
Defendant Counsel: Barrister Stephanie Tseung (contracted by the Hong Kong Legal Aid Department)
Verdict: Not Guilty, ruling overturned

Barrister Stephanie Tseung argued that the defendant, with a Form 5 (US equivalent: High School Junior) education level, cannot handle the complex legal views of the trial, and that the judge did not take this into account. Also, Tseung argued that the officers were acting outside of legal bounds, and that whether or not Lam Ka-shun committed the assault or not, the assault cannot be considered as an assault on a police officer.

=== Richard Ngai's Assault Case ===
Case Type: Criminal
Case Name: Government of Hong Kong v Richard Ngai
Charges: Hong Kong Ordinance Cap 212 s 19 (wounding or inflicting grievous bodily harm)
Plea: Innocent
Prosecution Counsel: Barrister Yuen Ding-fong of the Department of Justice
Defendant Counsel: Senior Counsel Tony Tseung
Verdict: Case dismissed due to lack of evidence.

Richard Ngai was accused of assaulting a business partner with a golf club. The case was considered to be unwinnable for Tony Tseung, and Tony initially tried to argue that Trial by Media had unfairly influenced the legal proceeding. That argument was overruled. Tony also tried to use the insanity defence, but Richard refused, instead asking Tony's law pupil, Darren Lee, to bribe a witness to "induce amnesia" in court.

== Cast ==
=== Major characters ===
- Tony Tseung (蔣文滔, portrayed by Adam Cheng) - A Senior Counsel whose unscrupulous (but ethical) tactics have drawn much criticism in the past, as well as alienating his family and lovers. However, he managed to rehabilitate his reputation, and reconcile with his family.
- Chong Hiu-wai (莊曉慧, portrayed by Louisa So) - A law clerk at the Legal Aid Department, she is also a volunteer, and she helped Tony Tseung in his transformation into a better person.
- Stephanie Tseung (蔣思庭, portrayed by Leila Tong) - Daughter of Tony Tseung. She is a barrister who hated her father's unscrupulous tactics. She tried to get as far away from her father as she can at first, but eventually reconciled with her father after his transformation into a better and more ethical barrister.
- Lam Ka-shun (林家信, portrayed by Sammul Chan) - A truck driver who got to know Tony Tseung's daughter,
- Sophie So (蘇若菲, portrayed by Anne Heung) - A former lover of Tony Tseung, who eventually cheated on him, and dated Richard Ngai.
- Darren Lee (李廣德, portrayed by Power Chan) - An apprentice of Tony Tseung. He later acquired Tony's unscrupulous ways, and became Richard Ngai's counsel after his fallout with Tseung.
- Richard Ngai (倪承坤, portrayed by Bill Chan) - A wealthy businessman who hired Tony Tseung as his counsel in the past, but later fell out with him.

=== Minor characters ===
==== Appearances throughout ====
- Anna Sung (宋綺華, portrayed by Mary Hon) - Ex-wife of Tony Tseung. She remained on good terms with her ex-husband, who frequents the new restaurant Sung and her new husband opens.
- Chui Yen Dong (徐恩東, portrayed by Li Shing-cheong - Second husband of Anna Sung. He opened Chez Mois, a new French restaurant with his wife. The restaurant is frequented by Tony Tseung.
- Ko Hoi-ting (高開霆, portrayed by Matt Yeung)- He, along with his brother, Ko Wai-ting, are Richard Ngai's lawyers, although they typically handle less sophisticated or challenging cases than those handled by Tony Tseung.
- Ko Wai-ting (高威霆, portrayed by (Dennis So) - He and his brother, Ko Hoi-ting, are Richard Ngai's lawyers.

==== Legal Aid Department workers ====
- Rose Yu (余樂施, portrayed by Angela Tong)- A Senior Law Clerk, she has a secret crush on her supervisor, but she did not reveal it until a client went behind her back and told her supervisor.
- Yeung Ching (楊拯, portrayed by Ko Jun-man- The Assistant Department Head. He is the love interest of Rose Yu.

==== Beginning ====
- Mr Smith (portrayed by Gregory Charles Rivers)- A barrister who specialize in International Law. Stephanie Tseung wanted to be his pupil, but backed out after discovering that her father influenced Mr. Smith.

==== House acquisition case ====
- Ngai Fat (倪發, portrayed by Lo Chun-shun)- Father of Richard Ngai. The character has already died, and only appears in flashback during this arc.
- Mary Yu (余翠竹, portrayed by Pak Yan. Appearance in flashbacks portrayed by Janice Shum)- One of four squatters of a flat in a soon to be demolished house. Her actions in the past caused the foursome to lose their flat.
- Fong Gim-lam (方劍蘭, portrayed by Lai Shou-ying)- One of the foursome who lived in the residence in question.
- Shum Wing-mui (沈詠梅, portrayed by Apple Ha)- One of the foursome who lived in the residence in question.
- Chin Mei-guk (錢美菊, portrayed by Siu Yuk-sim)- One of the foursome who lived in the residence in question.

== Viewership ratings ==
	Week	Episode	Average Points	Peaking Points	References
1	April 3–7, 2006	1 — 5	31	—	
2	April 10–14, 2006	6 — 10	31	33	
3	April 17–21, 2006	11 — 15	33	—	
4	April 24–28, 2006	16 — 20	34	—	
