= Wars of Bribery =

1996 Hong Kong television series

- DVD cover
- 廉政行動組
- Genre: Crime
- Screenplay by: Wong Wai-keung; Au Kin-yee; Yim Lai-wah; Lam Ching-chung; Ng Siu-tung
- Directed by: Derek Chiu; Yu Chui-wah; Lau Sun-on; Lau Siu-mui; Wong Shun; Ng Siu-wing
- Starring: Aaron Kwok; Athena Chu; Ben Ng; Esther Kwan; Marco Ngai; Bowie Wu; Mimi Chu; Strawberry Yeung
- Theme music composer: Huang Kuo-lun
- Opening theme: Off Track (脫軌) by Aaron Kwok
- Ending theme: Unforgettable (忘不了) by Aaron Kwok
- Composer: Yin Wen-chi
- Country of origin: Hong Kong
- Original language: Cantonese
- No. of episodes: 20

Production
- Producer: Steven Tsui
- Production location: Hong Kong
- Camera setup: Multi camera
- Production company: TVB

Original release
- Network: TVB Jade
- Release: 10 June – 5 July 1996

Wars of Bribery
- Traditional Chinese: 廉政行動組
- Simplified Chinese: 廉政行动组
- Literal meaning: "ICAC Operation Unit"
Transcriptions
Standard Mandarin
- Hanyu Pinyin: Lián Zhèng Xíng Dòng Zǔ
Yue: Cantonese
- Jyutping: Lim4 Zing3 Hang4 Dung6 Zou2

Wars of Bribery is a 1996 Hong Kong crime television series produced by TVB that aired on its channel TVB Jade from 10 June to 5 July 1996. This drama is also that final series that stars Aaron Kwok and Athena Chu filmed for the television station.

== Plot ==
Yeung Tai-chi (Aaron Kwok), a newcomer investigator of the ICAC, is met with frequent failures, but he remains optimistic. Chiu Wing-yee (Athena Chu), also a new member of the ICAC, is so aggressive that she always challenges Chi. Police officer Yau Lok-sang (Ben Ng) gets to know Leung Siu-man (Esther Kwan), who is blind, by chance. He is attracted by her optimistic personality and the two become lovers. Though Chi and Yee quarrel often, they manage to discover various briberies and they eventually fall in love. In the course of investigation, Chi is forced to make decisions between love, friendship, family and justice, and has difficulty in facing the dilemma.

== Cast ==
- Aaron Kwok as Yeung Tai-chi (楊大志)
- Athena Chu as Chiu Wing-yee (趙詠兒)
- Ben Ng as Yau Lok-sang (游樂生)
- Esther Kwan as Leung Siu-man (梁小敏)
- Marco Ngai as Benny Cheung Wang-bun (鄭宏彬)
- Bowie Wu as Yeung Wai-tong (楊偉棠)
- Mimi Chu as Chan Oi-yuk (陳愛玉)
- Strawberry Yeung as Jessica Ho (何恩平)
- Felix Lok as Ko Chun-yip (高振業)
- Ai Wai as Fung Po (馮波)
- Chan On-ying as Lee Suet-ying (李雲英)
- Deno Cheung as Ho Wing-tat (何永達)
- Luk Hei-yeung as Wong Ka-hon (王家漢)
- Wong Man-piu as Chan Wing-kwai (陳榮貴)
- Lam Pui-kwan as Lam Mei-yee (林美儀)
- Lee Chi-kei as Chan Wai (陳偉)
- Sunny Tai as Cheng Ping (鄭平)
- Shum Wai as Wong Ha-pak (王夏柏)
- Wong Chun-ning as Pak's assistant
- Cheng Shui-hiu as ICAC investigator
- Tong Chun-ming as ICAC investigator
- Shum Sing-ming as ICAC investigator
- Wong Tai-wai as ICAC investigator
- Lulu Kai as Air stewardess / Nurse
- Ng Wai-san as Air stewardess / Nurse
- Ling Hon as Chan Chat (陳七)
- Lai Sau-ying as Granny Luk (六婆)
- Tang Yu-chiu as Ming (阿明)
- Wong Sun as Uncle Cat (貓叔)
- Fung Shui-chun as Madam Cat (貓嫂)
- Lam Ka-lai as Car owner
- Shum Bo-sze as ICAC investigator
- Lui Wing-yee as ICAC investigator
- Hui Chuen-hing as Chu Sir (朱SIR)
- Chuek Fan as ICAC investigator
- Eric Li as ICAC investigator
- Mak Ka-lun as Eric
- Derek Kok as Yau Pei (優皮)
- Jim Ping-hei as Paul
- Sue Tam as Lai Sau-lin (黎秀蓮)
- King Kong Lam as Leung Siu-wah (梁小華)
- Lily Liew as Cheung Yuk-fung (張玉鳳)
- Lee Hoi-sang as Leung Wing-choi (梁永財)
- Daniel Kwok as Yau Pei's underling
- Lo Kong as Yau Pei's underling
- Tai Siu-man as Ng Ka-on (吳家安)
- Man Kit-wan as Kuen (阿娟)
- Ting Lik as Wing Jai (榮仔)
- Suen Hing-kwai as Hong Pak (康伯)
- Lau Kong as Lam Yiu-chung (林耀忠)
- Michelle Fung as Ho Yim-kam (何艷琴)
- Wong Siu-lung as CID
- Pok Kwan as Mr. Chan (陳生)
- English Tang as Kwan Wai-lam (關偉林)
- Cheung Hon-pan as Teacher A
- Chan Yin-hong as Teacher B
- Ho Mei-ho as Teacher C
- Yiu Chau-po as Teacher D
- Wong Sing-seung as Hung Kei (鴻記)
- Gregory Charles Rivers as Johnny
- Yu Tin-wai as President Wong (王社長)
- Ho Sam as Bank staff
- Luk Yuen-fan as Airline staff
- Isaac Ng as Fung (峰)
- Jerry Koo as Leopard (金錢豹)
- Lee Yiu-king as Crazy Piu (喪標)
- Yau Piu as Leopard's underling
- Lo Wai as Leopard's underling
- Chu Lok-fai as Piu's underling
- Cheung Chun-wah as Piu's underling
- Suen Yan-ming as Johnny's underling
- Marco Lo as Johnny's underling
- Lau Wing-chun as CID
- Cheung Kwok-keung as Lau Chi-leung (劉子良)
- Andy Tai as Ma Wai-lam (馬偉林)
- Ceci So as Ms. Chan (陳姑娘)
- Chu Kit-yee as Judy
- Ngo Yeuk-ching as Ying-ying (瑩瑩)
- Siu Yuk-yin as Maggie
- Law Pun-nang as Hospital department head
- Ruco Chan as Sei (阿四)
- Kong Hon as Poon Sai-cheung (潘世昌)
- Kwok Tak-shun as Hui Yiu-kei (許耀基)
- Fong Kit as Thomas Chow
- Kitty Lau as Chan Mei-wai (陳美惠)
- Ho Cheung-kwan as Doggie Chiu (狗仔超)
- Au Ngok as Poon household maid
- Chan Chung-kin as Worker
- Lui Kim-kwong as Worker
- Zuki Lee as Saleswoman
- Leung Chiu-ho as Repairman

== See also ==
- Aaron Kwok filmography
