= Blade Heart =

- Promo poster
- 血薦軒轅
- Genre: Costume drama
- Starring: Adam Cheng; Liza Wang; Raymond Lam; Shirley Yeung
- Opening theme: "Chaos" (亂) performed by Adam Cheng
- Ending theme: "Ask Heaven" (問天) performed by Adam Cheng and Liza Wang; "Lovers' Drink" (情人酒) performed by Adam Cheng and Liza Wang
- Country of origin: Hong Kong
- Original languages: Cantonese; Japanese
- No. of episodes: Hong Kong version: 37; International release: 42

Production
- Running time: 45 minutes per episode

Original release
- Network: TVB
- Release: March 8 – April 24, 2004

Blade Heart (Chinese: 血薦軒轅 Japanese: 血の推薦軒轅.) is a Hong Kong television series released on 12 March 2004 by TVB.

== Synopsis ==
Set in the early reign of Ming Emperor Wanli, the masked and mysterious Jinyiwei Captain Yuwen Feng serves the eunuch Zheng Cheng in his power struggle against rivals Zhang Juzheng and Eunuch Feng Bao when his investigation into an attempt on the Emperor's life leads him to encounter one Mrs. Wang, the widow of a private security firm owner. As it turned out Yuwen is in fact a Wu dang disciple by the name of Ling Feng who, 20 years prior was married to Tong Bik, the daughter of one of two prestigious sword smith clans in the capital. Their lives are uprooted one fateful night when the Tong clan are framed for treason and sentenced to death with all believing to have perished but Ling. Admiring his swordsmanship, Zheng Cheng (who is the director of the Jinyiwei) offered to spare Feng from execution and provide a new identity in return for his sworn loyalty for the next 20 year after which Ling would be permitted to seek revenge on the Sima sword-smith clan which he is told are responsible for the Tong clan's extermination. Having accepted the deal, Feng wears a mask to hind his identity while rising through the ranks under Cheng completely unaware that his wife Tong Bik is in fact still alive and also seeking revenge on the Sima clan. Having given away her and Feng's child for this endeavor, she eventually remarries a security bureau officer, having a second child with him before leading their bureau to the capital in his dying years as Mrs. Wang.

Recognizing his former wife while his mask keeps his identity from her, Feng is forced by his yet to expire contract with Cheng to watch from the shadows as his wife reestablishes a sword forgery in the capital and challenges the position of the Sima clan while planning to assassinate the elder Sima brother, Sima Yi who is believed to have masterminded the Tong's fate. The separated couple is however faced with further challenges as they come to find their past has returned to haunt them with Wang's first son unknowingly becoming entangled in her plot for revenge while Feng comes to find out just deep the plot against the Tongs are as he begins to question his trust in Cheng.

== Cast ==
Note: Some of the characters' names are in Cantonese romanisation.

- Adam Cheng as Ling Fung / Captain Yu Man-fung, Jinyiwei (a Samurai from Japan named as: yumiko fuuma.)
- Liza Wang as Tong Bik / Mrs Wong
- Raymond Lam as Mang Lui / Captain Cho Ngan, Jinyiwei
- Shirley Yeung as Wong Yee
- Mimi Lo as Chun Wai (Tsun Wai)
- Yeung Suet as Sima Ping-ting
- Carlo Ng as Sima Siu-yiu
- Gregory Lee as Ho Fei
- Lily Li as Leung Sau-kiu (Mrs Mang)
- Lo Hoi-pang as Eunuch Fung Bo
- Olivia Fu as Chun Mui
- Wong Shu-kei as Lau Sin-leung
- Zhang Heng as Wong Hap
- Chan Hung-lit as Cheung Sing / Eunuch
- Yu Yeung as Ho Kwan
- Chen Zhihui as Fo Sang
- Tsui Wing as Jinyiwei Lieutenant
- Shen Baoping as Zhang Juzheng
- Wang Deshun as Qi Jiguang
