= Noel Leung =

Hong Kong actress

- Born: 29 December 1969 (age 56); Macau
- Occupation: Actress
- Years active: 1990–present
- Spouse: Gary Chan Ka-fai (m. 2000)
- Children: 1 son (b. 2007)

Chinese name
- Traditional Chinese: 梁小冰
Transcriptions
Standard Mandarin
- Hanyu Pinyin: Liáng Xiǎobīng
- Musical career

Noel Leung Siu-bing (born 29 December 1969 in Macau) is a Hong Kong actress known for her roles in TVB television. She was the second runner-up in Miss Hong Kong 1990.

== Filmography ==
Year	Title	Role	Notes
1991	Thief of Honor		
1992	Revelation of the Last Hero	Yiu Ji Ping	
1992	The Lone Star Swordsman	Chin Sik	
1992	Being Twins		
1992	Bet on the Best Bet		
1993	Heroes from Shaolin		
1994	The Swordsman Lai Bo Yi		
1994	Fate of the Last Empire	Empress Dowager Cixi	
1994	Love Cycle		
1994	The Ching Emperor	Princess Roujia	
1995	Justice Pao		
1995	Fist of Power		
1995	From Act to Act		
1996	Ambition		
1996	Once Upon a Time in Shanghai		
1996	The Legend of Master Chai		
1997	The Hitman Chronicles		
1997	Against the Blade of Honour		
1998	Dark Tales II		
1998	The Duke of Mount Deer	Chan Yuenyuen	
1999	Food Glorious Food		
2000	Butterfly Lovers	Zhu Yingtai	
2002	Lady Stealer	Ding Dong	
2003	Light of Million Hope	Ng Suk-fong	
2005	Magical Needle		
2006	Men Suddenly in Black II		
2010	The Stool Pigeon		
2012	I Love Hong Kong 2012		
2012	Strangers 6		
2013	Unbeatable	psychiatrist	
2015	The Menu		
2015	Port of Call		
2015	Karma		
