= Esther Kwan =

Hong Kong actress (born 1964)

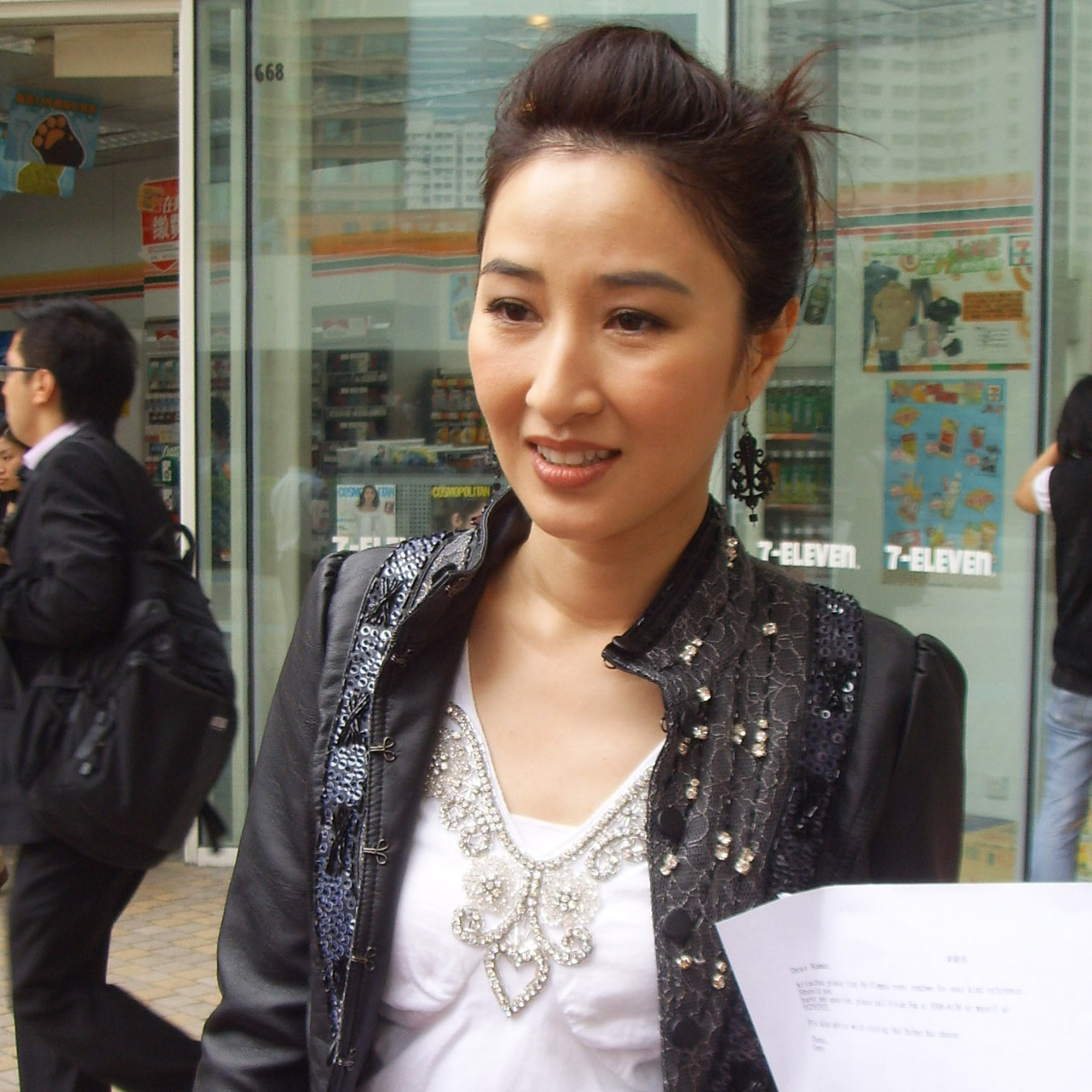
- Born: 16 July 1964 (age 61); British Hong Kong
- Spouse: Nick Cheung (m. 2003–present)
- Children: 1
- Awards: TVB Anniversary Awards – Best Actress; 1997 Lady Flower Fist

Chinese name
- Traditional Chinese: 關詠荷
- Simplified Chinese: 关咏荷
Transcriptions

Esther Kwan Wing-ho (simplified Chinese: 关咏荷; traditional Chinese: 關詠荷), born 16 July 1964 is a Hong Kong retired actress formerly contracted to TVB and ATV.

== Career ==
Kwan began her acting career after high school at ATV from 1988 to 1993. She moved over to TVB in 1993 and has been at the broadcaster on and off. Kwan met Hong Kong actor Nick Cheung while she was still working for ATV. The couple married on 8 November 2004 in Australia. Their daughter, Brittany Cheung (張童) was born on 24 January 2006. In 2008, Kwan left acting to spend more time with her daughter, only returning to film two TVB dramas The Season of Fate (2010) and Always and Ever (2013).

She is fluent in Cantonese, Mandarin and English.

== Filmography ==
=== Television ===
Year	Title	Role	Awards
1989	The Final Judgement		
1989	Police Archives		
1990	Love is like Oxygen		
1990	The Blood Sword		
1990	What A Summer		
1991	The Burning Rain		
1992	All In One Family		
1992	Spirit of the Dragon		
1993	Run and Kill		
1993	Mind Our Own Business		
1994	Modern Romance		
1994	The Intangible Truth		
1994	Green Hornet		
1995	When a Man Loves a Woman	Fong Man-wah	
1995	Corruption Doesn't Pay	Kam Bo Lai	
1995	The Unexpected		
1996	Guan Gong	Sun Shangxiang	
1996	Top Banana Club		
1996	Mutual Affection		
1996	Wars of Bribery		
1997	A Recipe for the Heart	Chun So-so	
1997	Lady Flower Fist	Miu Chui-fa	TVB Anniversary Award for Best Actress
1997	Taming of the Princess	Princess Shing-ping	TVB Anniversary Award for Best Couple
1998	Armed Reaction	Chu So-Ngor	Nominated - TVB Anniversary Award for Best Actress; Nominated - TVB Anniversary Award for Best Couple
1998	Burning Flame	Shum Pik-yiu	Nominated - TVB Anniversary Award for Best Actress
1999	A Loving Spirit	Chow Sau-ying	Nominated - TVB Anniversary Award for My Favourite On-Screen Partners
2000	The Legendary Four Aces	Chau-heung / Chau-yuet	
2000	Armed Reaction 2	Chu So-Ngor	
2002	Book and Sword, Gratitude and Revenge	Huoqingtong	
2007–2008	Best Selling Secrets	Wong Ka-lam	Nominated - TVB Anniversary Award for My Favourite Female Character
2010	The Season of Fate	Lin Sheung-chun	
2013	Always and Ever	Phoenix Yeung, Hon Seung Seung, Tin Chau Fung	

== Awards ==
- 1999 Nextmedia Awards ~ Top Ten TV Celebrities [6th place]
- 1999 Nextmedia Awards ~ Top Ten TV Programs ["Burning Flame" in 4th place; "Armed Reaction" in 6th place]
- 1998 Top Ten Couples [w/ real-life partner, Nick Cheung] ~ hailed as showbiz's "Golden Couple"
- 1999 RTHK Radio 2 Awards ~ 1998 Best TV Couple[w/ Bobby Au Yeung]
- 1998 RTHK's Number One Celebrity Awards ~ No.1 Best Performing Artist[Voted by Public]
- 1998 NextMedia Awards ~ Top Ten TV Celebrities [1st Runner Up]
- 1997 RTHK Awards ~ Best Performing Actress [Gold]
- 1997 TVB Best Actress Award
- 1997 TVB Best Couple Award (along w/ Bobby Au Yeung)

Awards and achievements
TVB Anniversary Awards
Preceded by N/A	Best Actress; 1997 for Lady Flower Fist	Succeeded by Ada Choi for Secret of the Heart
