= Amy Kwok =

Miss Hong Kong and Chinese actress from Hong Kong

- 郭藹明
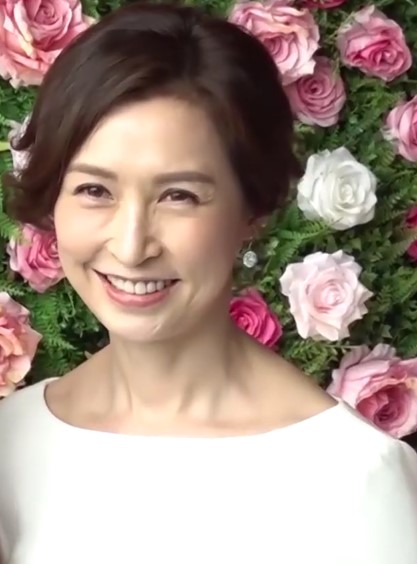
- Amy Kwok attending an event for Canvas Beauty in April 2019.
- Born: 26 September 1967 (age 59); Hong Kong
- Other names: Kwok Oi-Ming, Amy Kwok Oi-Ming, Amy Oi-Ming Kwok
- Occupation: Actress
- Years active: 1991-2006
- Known for: Miss Hong Kong (1991)
- Spouse: Sean Lau (1998–present)

Chinese name
- Traditional Chinese: 郭藹明
- Simplified Chinese: 郭蔼明
Transcriptions
Standard Mandarin
- Hanyu Pinyin: Guō Ǎimíng

Amy Kwok (born September 26, 1967) is a former Miss Hong Kong winner and actress based in Hong Kong.

== Education ==
Kwok earned a degree in Electrical Engineering from the California State University. She subsequently earned a master's degree in Mechanical Engineering from the University of Southern California.

== Career ==
In 1985, Kwok became an actress in the Hong Kong film industry. Kwok first appeared as Cindy in The Island, a horror drama film directed by Po-Chih Leong.

In 1991, Kwok won the Miss Hong Kong beauty pageant.

== Filmography ==
=== Films ===
- 1985 The Island - Cindy
- 1993 Fong Sai-yuk II - Princess
- 1994 Let's Go Slam Dunk - Ah Shun
- 1994 A Gleam of Hope - Lu Yuen May
- 1999 Victim - Amy Fu

=== Television series ===
- No Turning Back (2006)
- Legend of Fang De and Miau Cui Hua (2006)
- To Love with No Regrets (2004)
- True Love (2003)
- The Trust of a Life Time (2002)
- Divine Retribution (2000)
- Justice Sung II (1999)
- Secret of the Heart (1998)
- Justice Sung (1997)
- ICAC Investigators 1996 (1996)
- Detective Investigation Files II (1995)
- A Good Match from Heaven (1995)
- Instinct (1994)
- Conscience (1994)
- Ambition (1993)
- The Art of Being Together (1993)
- Heroes from Shaolin (1993)
- The Link (1993)
- The Greed of Man (1992)

== Personal life ==
Kwok's husband is Sean Lau, an actor.

Kwok started dating Sean Lau since 1992 after they met on the set of The Greed of Man. They married after dating for six years.

Achievements
Preceded by Anita Yuen	Miss Hong Kong; 1991	Succeeded by Emily Lo
