= Divine Retribution (TV series) =

2000 drama series broadcast by ATV in Hong Kong

- VCD cover
- Genre: Financial thriller Drama
- Created by: Wai Ka-fai
- Written by: Yau Nai-hoi; Tai Tak-kwong; Shek Hoi-ting; Yip Tin-shing; Ho Wing-nin
- Directed by: Tam Long-cheung; Lau Chun-ming; Leung Yan-chuen; Yip Chiu-yee; Lau Chi-fu
- Starring: Sean Lau; Adam Cheng; Amy Kwok; Ben Wong; Xu Jinglei; Alice Chan; Anders Nelsson; Belinda Hamnett; Kristal Tin
- Opening theme: Passerby of the Great Era (大時代過客) by Adam Cheng
- Ending theme: How Much Fame and Wealth (名利有幾多) by Adam Cheng
- Country of origin: Hong Kong
- Original language: Cantonese
- No. of episodes: 40

Production
- Producer: Wai Ka-fai
- Running time: 45 minutes each episode
- Production company: ATV

Original release
- Network: ATV Home
- Release: 11 September – 3 November 2000

Divine Retribution
- Traditional Chinese: 世紀之戰
- Simplified Chinese: 世纪之战
- Literal meaning: "The Battle of the Century"
Transcriptions
Standard Mandarin
- Hanyu Pinyin: Shì Jì Zhī Zhàn
Yue: Cantonese
- Jyutping: Sai3 Gei2 Zi1 Zin3

Divine Retribution (世紀之戰) is a TV drama series broadcast by ATV in Hong Kong on 11 September 2000. The series is supposed to be a sequel to TVB's 1992 series The Greed of Man, and was initially called (大時代2000), literally "Greed of Man 2000". Part of the reason for the name change (Chinese + English) was said to be due to legal rights disputes. Douban reviews have suggested that the sequel to a TVB series being adopted by a rival channel ATV was actually not a major controversy.

== Synopsis ==
The series takes place in the future year of 2003, where the stock market has created financial crisis that caused complete chaos in the Asia pacific regions. Ting Yeh (Adam Cheng) and Fong San-hap (Sean Lau) now renew their battle and continue where they left off.

== Characters ==
The roles by Sean Lau and Adam Cheng are mainly unchanged from the previous series despite the name change. Other characters from The Greed of Man were portrayed by different actors cast by ATV, while Amy Kwok, who had a role in The Greed of Man, portrays a different character in this series.

=== Fong family ===
Cast	Role	Description
Sean Lau	Fong San-hap (方新俠)	A stock market genius who made most of his fortune during the 1990s stock market showdown against the Ting family.

=== Ting family ===
Cast	Role	Description
Adam Cheng	Ting Yeh (丁野)	A brute who has escaped from prison to avenge his family
Lawrence Yan (甄志強)	Ting Yat-yeh (丁一野)	Ting family's oldest son
Andrew Yuen (袁文傑)	Ting Yee-yeh (丁二野)	Ting family's 2nd son
Chun Kai-wai (秦啟維)	Ting Sam-yeh (丁三野)	Ting family's 3rd son

=== Others ===
Cast	Role	Description
Amy Kwok	Cheung Keung (張強)	A therapist who is in charge of Ting Yeh. She used to be Fong San-hap's primary school classmate and they start a relationship after reuniting.
Ben Wong	Chun Tou-tin (秦滔天)	Fong San-hap's assistant and mentee. He handles the company when Fong is away.
Xu Jinglei	Yuen Siu-mui (阮少梅)	Fong San-hap's spouse. She is sweet, down-to-earth, pure and faithful, but extremely frugal in spending.
Xu Jinglei	Siu-kuk (少菊)	A woman resembling Siu-mui who was sent by Chun Tou-tin to spy on Fong San-hap.
Alice Chan	Ching Hei-man (程希文)	
Cecilia Lai (黎思嘉)	Shek Leung-chan (石良真)	
Anders Nelsson	Seth (賽斯)	
Belinda Hamnett	Cheng Miu-miu (鄭妙妙)	Fong San-hap's love interest.
Kristal Tin	Kei Siu-kwan (祈少軍)	
Kenneth Chan	Au-yeung Wai-lun (歐陽瑋倫)	
Susan Tse	Professor Lam (林教授)	
Cheung Yeung (宗揚)	Frankie	
Lam Nai-chung (林乃忠)	Lei Ka-shing (利家誠)	A spoof of Li Ka-shing
Cheung Yip-cyun (張頁川)	Kwok Ying-zung (郭英中)	A spoof of Henry Fok
Wong Man-zi (王文治)	Ho San (何新)	A spoof of Stanley Ho
