= Derek Kok =

Hong Kong actor

- Born: 18 November 1964 (age 61); Panyu, Guangdong, China
- Occupation: Actor
- Years active: 1986–present

Chinese name
- Traditional Chinese: 郭政鴻
- Simplified Chinese: 郭政鸿
Transcriptions
Yue: Cantonese
- Jyutping: Gwok3 Zing3 Hung4

Derek Kok Jing-hung (Chinese: 郭政鴻, born 18 November 1964) is a Hong Kong actor who had worked for TVB from 1986 to 2015. He filmed over 70 dramas. He is specialised in action and Chinese Kung Fu performance.

== Career ==
His career started when he entered the New Talent Singing Awards in 1985. Even though he only made it through to the semi-finals, his stage performance, including the acrobatics he demonstrated throughout his performance impressed the folks at TVB. He then entered the TVB Artist Training Class in 1985 and was signed with the station after completion of the program. The first notable role he played was Lee Yuen Ba in The Grand Canal. He left TVB in 2015 to sign a contract with a mainland Chinese company. In 2020, he also signed a contract with Shaw Brothers.

== Personal life ==
Between 2007 and 2010, Kok was rumoured to be involved with actress Joyce Tang, but both have insisted to have only been good friends. He has been married with his current wife since 2011 and has two daughters.

== Filmography ==
=== TV series ===
Year	Title	Role	Notes
1986	The Turbulent Decade		
1987	The Grand Canal		
1988	The Secret of Blood and Iron		
1989	The Final Combat		
1989	The War Heroes		
1989	Justice of Life		
1990	The Enforcer's Experience		
1991	The Crime File		
1991	The Breaking Point		
1991	Drifters		
1991	One Step Beyond		
1991	The Revelation of the Last Hero		
1992	The Greed of Man		
1992	File of Justice	Cop	
1993	The Partner		
1993	The Mystery of the Condor Hero		
1994	The Condor Heroes Return		
1994	The Legend of the Condor Heroes	Lu Guanying	
1994	Passion Among Us		
1994	Intangible Truth		
1994	The Qing Emperor		
1995	Detective Investigation Files		
1995	Nan Quan Bei Tui		
1995	Justice Pao		
1995	The Criminal Investigator		
1996	Dark Tales		
1996	Outbrust		
1996	Wars of Bribery		
1996	Journey to the West	Wu Gang	
1997	Detective Investigation Files III		
1997	Untraceable Evidence		
1998	War and Remembrance		
1998	Dark Tales II		
1998	Journey To The West II	Tong Bei Yuanhou	
1999	Detective Investigation Files IV		
2000	Legend of Lady Yang		
2000	The Legendary Four Aces		
2000	The Kung Fu Master		
2001	Kung Fu Master from Guangdong		
2001	The Track		
2001	A Step Into The Past	Wong Chin	
2001	Country Spirit		
2002	A Case of Misadventure		
2002	Treasure Raiders		
2002	Lofty Waters Verdant Bow		
2003	The King of Yesterday and Tomorrow		
2003	Vigilante Force		
2003	The 'W' Files		
2003	Survivor's Law		
2003	Triumph in the Skies		
2003	Find the Light		
2004	The Vigilante in the Mask		
2004	Twin of Brothers	Hau Hei Pak	
2004	Shades Of Truth		
2005	Strike at Heart		
2005	Misleading Track		
2005	Revolving Doors Of Vengeance	Long Gok Cheung	
2005	Real Kung Fu	Ching Kwong	
2006	Lethal Weapons of Love and Passion	Pong Ban	
2006	Au Revoir Shanghai	Hoh Jan-bon	
2006	Face to Fate	Lau Fan-yue	
2007	The Family Link	Cheuk Kam-biu	Nominated - Best Supporting Actor (Top 20)
2008	War of In-Laws II	Wong Chung-cheung	Nominated - Best Supporting Actor (Top 5); Nominated - Most Improved Actor (Top 5)
2008	The Master of Tai Chi	Lui Yau-ngo	Nominated - Most Improved Actor (Top 5)
2008	D.I.E	Cheung Ching-Yee	Nominated - My Favourite Male Character (Top 10); Nominated - Most Improved Actor (Top 5)
2008	Your Class or Mine	Ching Kwok-chu	Nominated - Most Improved Actor (Top 5)
2009	The King of Snooker	Lui Kin-chung	
2009	D.I.E. Again	Cheung Ching-yee	Nominated - Best Supporting Actor (Top 15)
2010	The Season of Fate	Leung Kau-mui	Nominated - Best Supporting Actor (Top 15)
2010	My Better Half	Kong San-sou	
2010	Show Me the Happy	Tong Gam-bou	
2011	Wax and Wane	Wong Hung	
2011	Lives of Omission	Sze To-hoi	Nominated — TVB Anniversary Award for Best Supporting Actor (Top 15)
2012	The Hippocratic Crush	Lui Siu-yat	
2012	Tiger Cubs	Ting Yau-tin	Episode 11: "I Want To Be A Cop"
2012	Highs and Lows	Ho Kwai	
2012–2013	Friendly Fire	Hung Chun-to	
2013	Always and Ever	Cho Pao	Episode 13-29 (16 episodes)
2013	The Hippocratic Crush II	Lui Siu-yat	
2014	Lady Sour	Fu Sam-yan	
2015	Wudang Rules	Ho Ching-tung	
2018	Flying Tiger	林 Sir	
2018	Shadow of Justice	劉智輝 / 劉 Sir	

=== TV films ===
- Killer's Code (1995)
- She Was Married to Mob (1996)

=== Films ===
Year	Title	Role	Notes
1984	The Eight Diagram Pole Fighter	Tartar soldier/student	
1984	Long Road to Gallantry		
1985	Disciples of the 36th Chamber	Shaolin secular student	
1985	Crazy Shaolin Disciples	Shaolin Monk	
1988	A Bloody Fight	Wai's Thug	
1989	The Last Duel		
1989	Handcuff Me, Brother		
1989	Devil Hunters		
1989	In the Line of Duty 4: Witness	Loan Shark's Thug	
1989	Seven Warriors	Bandit	
1990	My Neighbors Are Phantoms		
1990	Tiger Cage 2	uncredited	
1990	A Bite of Love	Fung's Thug (extra)	
1990	The Big Score	Policeman	
1990	Brave Young Girls	Extra	
1990	Forsaken Cop	Extra	
1990	Fatal Passion	Bodyguard	
1992	Hard Boiled	Gangster	
1992	Freedom Run Q	Yunan Troupe Member	
1994	To Love Ferrari	Paul	
1994	Fatal Encounter		
2008	Beast Stalker	Michael	
2010	72 Tenants of Prosperity	70's Fu	
2010	The Stool Pigeon	Officer Ku	
2019	Four Girls		
2019	Warrior 2		
