= Adam Cheng =

Hong Kong actor and singer

- 鄭少秋
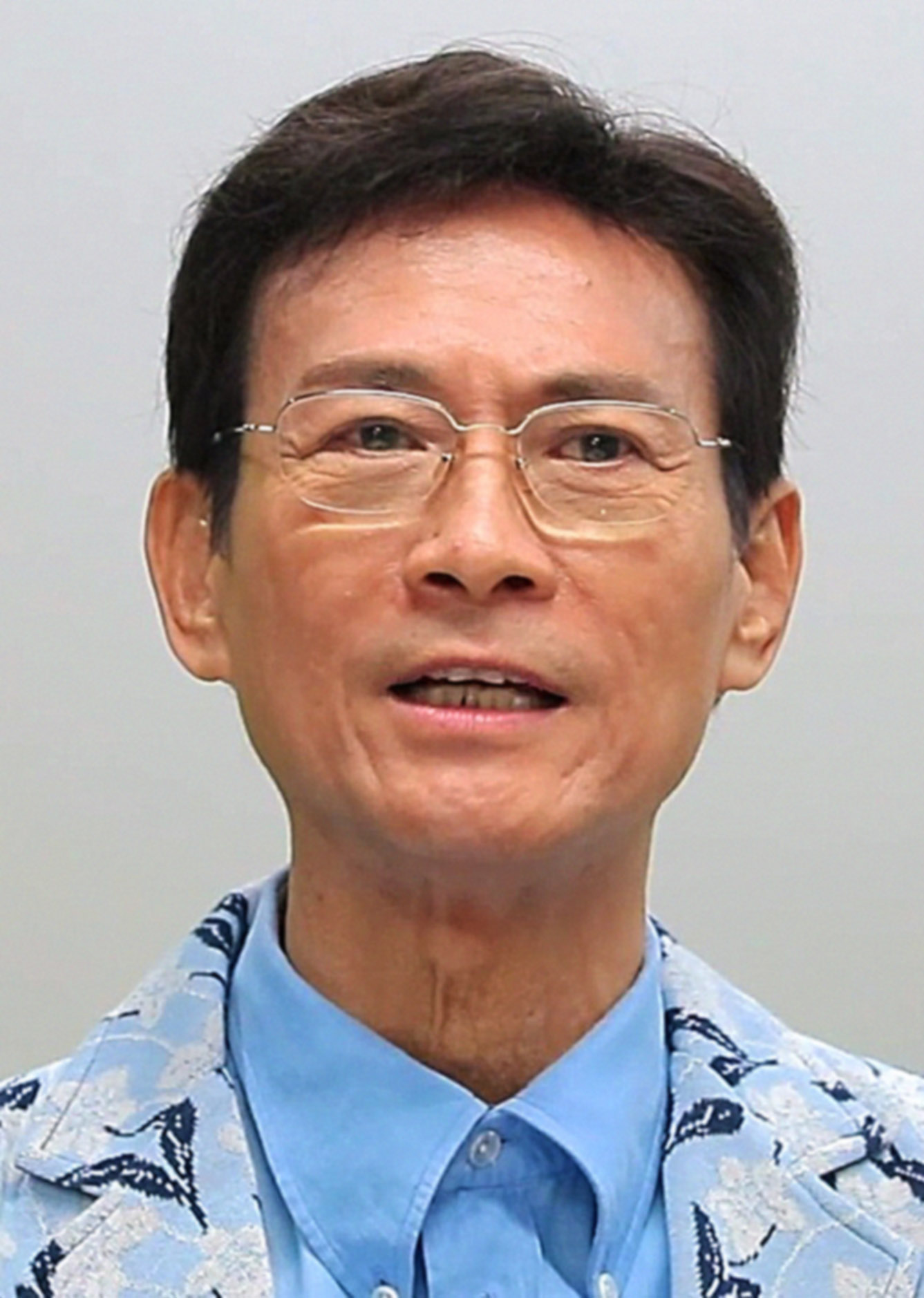
- Cheng in 2019
- Pronunciation: Cheng Chong-sai
- Born: Wong Ho-chung (黃可忠); 24 February 1947 (age 79); British Hong Kong
- Education: The Hong Kong Academy for Performing Arts
- Occupations: Actor; singer
- Years active: 1967–present
- Spouses: Lydia Shum (m. 1985; div. 1988) Koon Jing-wah (m. 1989)
- Children: 4, including Joyce Cheng
- Awards: Golden Needle Award; 2006 Lifetime Achievement

Cheng Siu-chau
- Traditional Chinese: 鄭少秋
- Simplified Chinese: 郑少秋
- Jyutping: Zeng6 Siu3 Cau1
Transcriptions
Standard Mandarin
- Hanyu Pinyin: Zhèng Shàoqiū
Yue: Cantonese
- Jyutping: Zeng6 Siu3 Cau1

Cheng Chong-sai
- Traditional Chinese: 鄭創世
- Simplified Chinese: 郑创世
- Jyutping: Zeng6 Cong3 Sai3
Transcriptions
Standard Mandarin
- Hanyu Pinyin: Zhèng Chuàngshì
Yue: Cantonese
- Jyutping: Zeng6 Cong3 Sai3

Second alternative Chinese name
- Traditional Chinese: 黃可忠
- Simplified Chinese: 黄可忠
- Jyutping: Wong4 Ho2 Zung1
Transcriptions
Standard Mandarin
- Hanyu Pinyin: Huáng Kězhōng
Yue: Cantonese
- Jyutping: Wong4 Ho2 Zung1
- Musical career
- Also known as: 秋官
- Origin: Hong Kong
- Genres: Cantopop

Adam Cheng Siu-chau (born 24 February 1947; formerly known as Cheng Chong-sai and Wong Ho-chung) is a Hong Kong TVB actor and Cantopop singer.

== Career ==
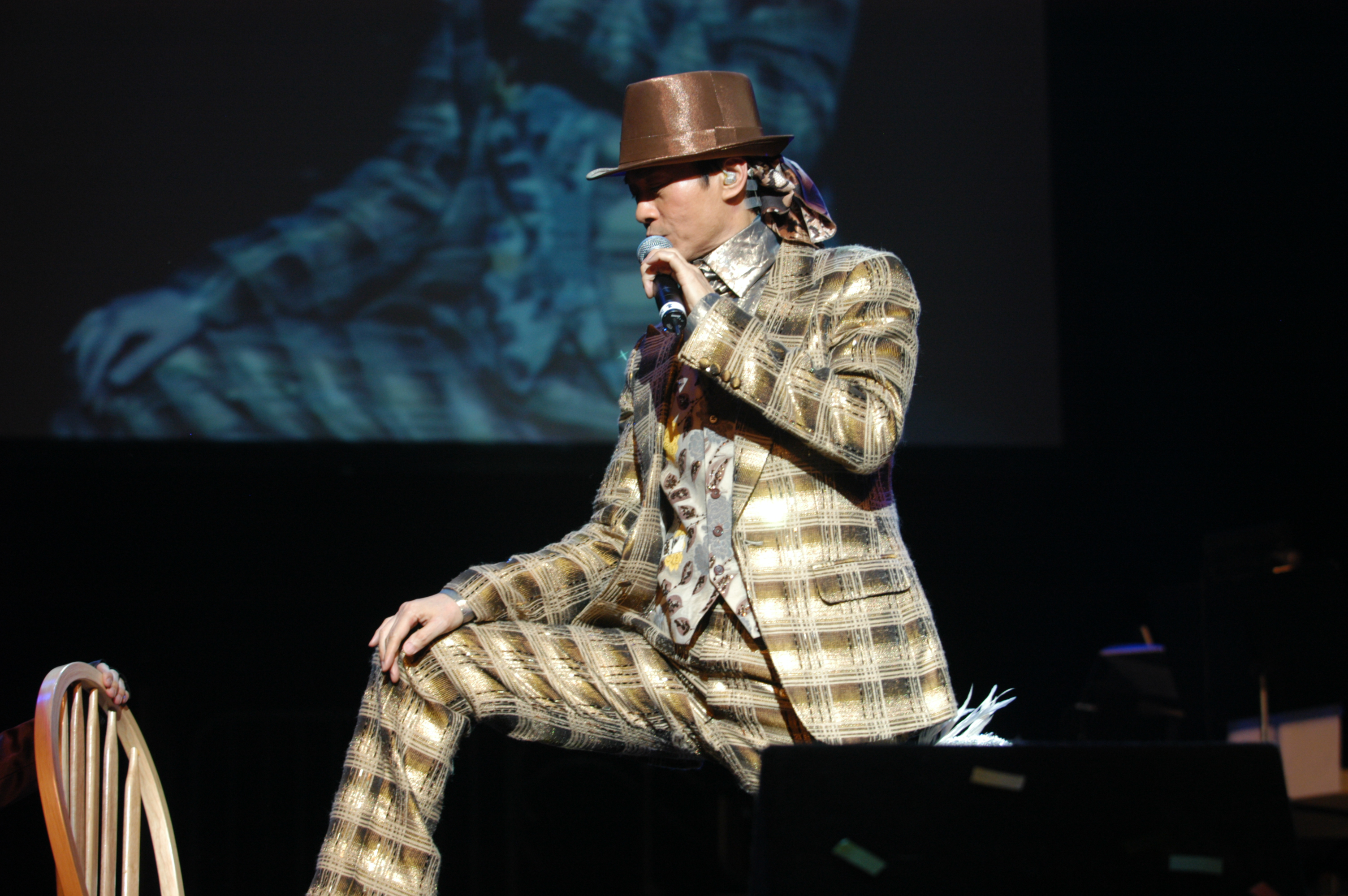
Cheng singing at a Singapore concert

Cheng graduated from the Hong Kong Academy for Performing Arts. He started his career in the 1970s, playing the lead roles in TVB's Wuxia drama series based on the works of Louis Cha and Gu Long, including The Heaven Sword and Dragon Saber and Chor Lau Heung. He also performed some of the theme songs of the TV series he starred in, such as The Greed of Man and Cold Blood Warm Heart.

== Ting Hai effect ==
In 1992, TVB released the TV series The Greed of Man, based on the central theme of the stock market, and exploring the schemes used by people to make their fortune in the market. Cheng played Ting Hai (丁蟹) in the series, who made a vast fortune by short selling derivatives and stocks during a bear market. Cheng became popularly associated with the Ting Hai effect, named after his character in the series, a peculiar and unexplained phenomenon in which global stock markets fall whenever a new Hong Kong TV drama series starring Cheng is aired.

== Filmography ==
=== Film ===
Year	Title	Role	Notes/Ref.
1967	A Sweet Girl		
1967	The Black Killer	Ng Chun Bong	
1967	I Love A-Go-Go		
1968	The Blossoming Rose	Ng Aan Man	
1968	Blue Falcon		
1980	The Sword		
1981	Shaolin and Wu Tang	Chao Fung-wu	
1981	Return of the Deadly Blade		
1982	Cat vs Rat		
1982	Fantasy Mission Force	Amazon leader	
1983	Zu Warriors from the Magic Mountain	Ting Yin	
1983	Lone Ninja Warrior		
1983	The Denouncement of Chu Liu Hsiang	Chu Liuxiang	
1984	Lover and Sword		
1984	General Invincible		
1988	Gunmen	Haye	
1988	Profiles of Pleasure		
1989	Seven Warriors		
1989	Path of Glory		
1992	Painted Skin	Scholar	
1993	Fong Sai-yuk	Chan Ka-lok	guest star
1993	Fong Sai-yuk II	Chan Ka-lok	
1993	The Eight Hilarious Gods	Lui Dung-ban	
1994	Drunken Master III	Wong Kei-ying	
1994	Shaolin Popey 2: Messy Temple		
1994	Shaolin Popeye 2 – Messy Temple		
2001	The Dark Tales		
2003	Double Crossing		
2013	Saving General Yang	Yang Ye	

=== Television ===
Year	Title	Role	Notes/Ref.
1975	God of River Lok	Cho Chik	
1976	Chinese Folklore		
1976	The Legend of the Book and the Sword	Chan Ka-lok / Kin-lung Emperor	
1977	The Great Vendetta		
1977	The Kingdom And The Beauty		
1977	Luk Siu-fung	Yip Koo-sing	
1978	Vanity Fair		
1978	The Heaven Sword and Dragon Saber	Cheung Mo-kei	
1978	One Sword		
1979	Chor Lau-heung	Chor Lau-heung	
1979	Over the Rainbow	Wai Ching-lap	
1980	Five Easy Pieces		
1980	Odd Couple		
1981	Brothers Four		
1981	In Love and War		
1981	The Hawk		
1981	The Misadventure of Zoo	Chu Gam Chun	
1982	The Switch		
1983	The Sandwich Man		
1985	Chor Lau-heung	Chor Lau-heung	
1985	The Legendary Prime Minister – Zhuge Liang	Chu-kot Leung	
1986	Legendary of Wud		
1986	The Legend of Wong Tai Sin	Wong Tai Sin	
1987	Fate Takes a Hand		
1988	Behind Silk Curtains		
1988	Final Verdict	Tse Man-mo	
1988	Challenge of the Imperial Palace		
1991	Chronicles of Emperor Qianlong		
1993	The Greed of Man	Ting Hai	
1994	Instinct	Wong Tin	
1994	Forty Something		
1995	Chor Lau-heung	Chu Liuxiang	
1995	Cold Blood Warm Heart	Ah Bong	
1995	The Legendary Chin Lung II		
1996	Once Upon a Time in Shanghai	Yu Chun-hoi	
1997	Legend of YungChing	Yongzheng Emperor	
2000	Divine Retribution	Ting Yeh	
2004	Blade Heart	Ling Fung / Yu Man-fung	
2004	The Conqueror's Story	Lau Bong	
2005	The Prince's Shadow	Ko Sing	
2006	Bar Bender	Tony Tseung	Nominated – TVB Anniversary Award for Best Actor (Top 20); Nominated – TVB Anniversary Award for My Favourite Male Character (Top 20)
2006	Inside the Forbidden City		
2007	Return in Glory		
2008	The Book and the Sword	Qianlong Emperor	
2009	The King of Snooker	Yau Yat-Kiu	
2009	God of Medicine		
2012	Master of Play	Kan Siu Nam	Nominated – My AOD Favourite Award for Top 15 Character
2018	Ever Night	Fu Zi (Sage Master)	

Awards
Preceded by Hong Kong Chinese Orchestra	Golden Needle Award of RTHK Top Ten Chinese Gold Songs Award; 2006	Succeeded by Teresa Carpio
