= The King of Snooker =

- Official poster
- 桌球天王
- Genre: Sports drama
- Starring: Adam Cheng; Niki Chow; Patrick Tang; Joyce Tang; Derek Kok; Benz Hui; Halina Tam
- Opening theme: "命運遊戲 (Destiny's Game)" by Adam Cheng
- Country of origin: Hong Kong
- Original language: Cantonese
- No. of episodes: 20

Production
- Producer: Terry Tong
- Running time: 45 minutes (approx.)

Original release
- Network: TVB
- Release: 30 March – 24 April 2009

The King of Snooker (Traditional Chinese: 桌球天王) is a TVB television drama miniseries revolving around the sport of snooker in Hong Kong. It was originally broadcast by the network in 2009, from 30 March through 24 April, and subsequently re-released on DVD in several translations.

== Synopsis ==
World champion snooker player Yau Yat Kiu (Adam Cheng) takes everyone by surprise when he suddenly retires from the snooker world. This comes as a huge disappointment to his daughter Yau Ka Kan (Niki Chow), who has always wanted to follow in his footsteps. She feels bewildered too, for although Kiu pretends he does not care about the sport any more, he has set up a series of challenge matches on the snooker table in his restaurant. His real purpose is that he is waiting for someone he feels is worth taking on as a protégé. Kiu comes to know Kan Tze Him (Patrick Tang) by chance. Noticing his flair for snooker, Kiu decides to teach Him all he knows about the game. Later, Kan manages to persuade her father into taking her on as a student as well.

Him fancies Kan, but she is fond of Lui Kin Chung (Derek Kok), Kiu's bitter rival. Chung's manager is a devious person; in order to ensure Chung's victory against Kiu, he drugs Kiu's water with sleeping pills during a match. After the game, Chung falls out with his manager because of this when he finds out.

Later in the series, a woman named Chin To To (Joyce Tang) falls in love with Kiu. Meanwhile, Him falls out with Kiu because of Chung's ex-manager. Both master and disciple come to settle their scores on a snooker table in the end.

== Cast ==
Cast	Role	Description
Adam Cheng	Yau Yat-Kiu 游一橋	Snooker Player; Yau Ka-Kan's father. Chin To-To's lover Kan Tze-Him's teacher
Niki Chow	Yau Ka-Kan 游加勤	Yau Yat-Kiu's daughter. Kan Tze-Him's lover.
Patrick Tang	Kan Tze-Him 靳子謙	Yau Yat-Kiu's apprentice. Yau Ka-Kan's lover. Chin To-To's nephew
Joyce Tang	Chin To-To (Toni) 錢滔滔	PR Director; Yau Yat-Kiu's lover. Kan Tze-Him's aunt
Derek Kok	Lui Kin-Chung (Ray) 雷建衝	Snooker Player
Benz Hui	Yau Yee-Bor 游二波	Yau Yat-Kiu's brother. See To Ma-Lei's lover
Halina Tam	See To Ma-Lei 司徒瑪莉	Chin To-To's cousin. Yau Yee-Bor's lover
Catherine Chau (周家怡)	Chow Hin Wai 周顯慧	Waitress
Mandy Wong	(Amy)	Starblaze employee

== Awards and nominations ==
TVB Anniversary Awards (2009):

- Best Drama
- Most Improved Actress (Catherine Chau)

== Viewership ratings ==
	Week	Episodes	Average points	Peaking points	References
1	March 30 – April 3, 2009	1–5	26	28	
2	April 6–10, 2009	6–10	26	—	
3	April 13–17, 2009	11–15	28	—	
4	April 20–24, 2009	16–20	27	32	

== DVD release ==
The entire 20-episode miniseries has been re-released as a region-free 4-disc DVD box set in NTSC video format. It features the original Cantonese and a Mandarin Chinese audio track, with English and Malay translation subtitles, and Chinese subtitles for the hearing-impaired.

== Notes ==
- In 2008, prior to filming, Joyce Cheng, along with Adam Cheng were considered, for they were daughter and father. Ultamitely, the former had schedule conflicts, ultimately causing Nikki Chow to inherit the role of Yau-Ka-Kan.
