= Once Upon a Time in Shanghai (TV series) =

1996 Hong Kong television series

- Also known as: New Bund
- Written by: Au Koon-ying; Pao Wai-chung
- Directed by: Chiu Chun-keung
- Starring: Adam Cheng; Carol Cheng; Sunny Chan; Gordon Lam; Adia Chan
- Theme music composer: Tsui Ka-leung
- Opening theme: Nang Fau Choi Yu Sheung (能否再遇上) performed by Adam Cheng
- Country of origin: Hong Kong
- Original language: Cantonese
- No. of episodes: 40

Production
- Executive producer: Chiu Chun-keung
- Production location: Hong Kong
- Running time: 45 minutes per episode
- Production company: TVB

Original release
- Network: TVB
- Release: 1996 – 1996

Related
- The Bund

Once Upon a Time in Shanghai
- Traditional Chinese: 新上海灘
Transcriptions

Once Upon a Time in Shanghai, also known as New Bund, is a Hong Kong television series and a remake of the 1980 television series The Bund. It was first aired on TVB in Hong Kong in 1996. The series starred Sunny Chan, Gordon Lam and Adia Chan as the original characters Hui Man-keung, Ting Lik and Fung Ching-ching respectively. It introduced some new changes to the original story, featuring new characters portrayed by Adam Cheng, Carol Cheng and others.

== Cast ==
- Adam Cheng as Yu Chun-hoi
- Carol Cheng as So Tsat-hau
- Sunny Chan as Hui Man-keung
- Gordon Lam as Ting Lik
- Adia Chan as Fung Ching-ching
- Pat Poon as Fung King-yiu
- Maggie Cheung as Koo Ching-wah
- Patrick Tam as Chan Hon-lam
- Gallen Lo as Kwok Say-wai
- Eric Tsang as So Chor-ng
- Alan Chui Chung-San as General Lung
- Noel Leung as Kong Tsi-kwan
- Law Ka-ying as Peter
- Bowie Lam as Tse Tung
- David Lui as Cheung-kwai
- Lee Ka-shing as Lok Tin-yau
- Florence Kwok as Fong Yim-wun
- Shirley Cheung
- Emily Kwan
