= Shawn Tng =

- Born: Singapore
- Occupations: Singer-songwriter, composer, musician,
- Musical career
- Also known as: 唐志伟, 唐志玮

Shawn Tng, 唐志瑋, is a singer and composer from Singapore.

== Early life and education ==
Tng studied Computer Science at National University of Singapore.

== Career ==
=== Music career ===
Tng started his music career with the release his first solo album "相信" in 1994, followed by his second album "觉醒" in 1995. In 1995, Tng was part of a Singaporean pop group, Three Springs (三個春天), comprising Jeremy Wong, Willie Tan and himself. Tng was dubbed by Hong Kong's media as the new Eric Moo.

Tng wrote a theme song titled "决定" for the popular TCS Channel 8 TV serial "真心男儿".

In 1995, Tng subsequently launched his singing career in Taiwan releasing his first album "爱你的我能怎么做". Tng also released a duet with Annie Yi titled "守侯".

In 1996, Tng wrote a theme song titled "See The Sunrise" for RTHK's annual "Solar Project"(太阳计划) which was performed by popular singers Kit Chan, Jacky Cheung, Leon Lai, Vivian Chow, Samuel Tai and some other RTHK's DJs.

In 1996, Tng performed the theme song for the animation series Street Fighter (街頭霸王). He also participated in the CASH Song Writers Quest and was the second runner-up with the song "早安".

In 1997, Taiwanese singer and actor Liu Wen-cheng named Tng as one of the rising stars of the Mandarin pop scene in 1996–97. Tng released his third album 愛你的我能怎麼做 and featured Taiwanese singer and actress YinShia in a music video for the song "决定" (Decision).

Tng would later retired from the music scene in the same year.

=== Other career ===
Tng joined Microsoft in 1999.

== Personal life ==
In 1996, Tng changed his Chinese name from 唐志伟 to 唐志玮, which pronounced as the same but change from 伟 to 玮, after consulting with a Zi Wei Dou Shu master in Taiwan.

== Discography ==
=== Albums ===
Album #	Album Information
1st	相信: Released: 1995; Label: Dreamland Production (S); Language: Mandarin
2nd	觉醒: Released: 1996; Label: Dreamland Production (S); Language: Mandarin
3rd	愛你的我能怎麼做: Released: 1996; Label: Fancy Pie Music Co Ltd; Language: Mandarin

=== Compilation ===
Year	Album Information
1995	三个春天 : 敲开梦和春天: Label: Dreamland Music; Language: Mandarin
1996	穿越時空 動心折價版 (宣傳單曲): Label: Unknown; Language: Mandarin

=== Featured in ===
Year	Album	Album Artist	Song Information
1994	决定!?	玖建	Title: You're My Hero; Language: Mandarin
1994	悲伤朱丽叶	Annie Yi	Track: 04; Title: 守候; Language: Mandarin

== Awards ==
Years	Awards
1996	CASH 香港作曲家及作詞家協會 Contest (Hong Kong), the 1st Runner-up.
