= Christopher Wong (singer) =

Chinese singer (born 1961)

- 黃凱芹
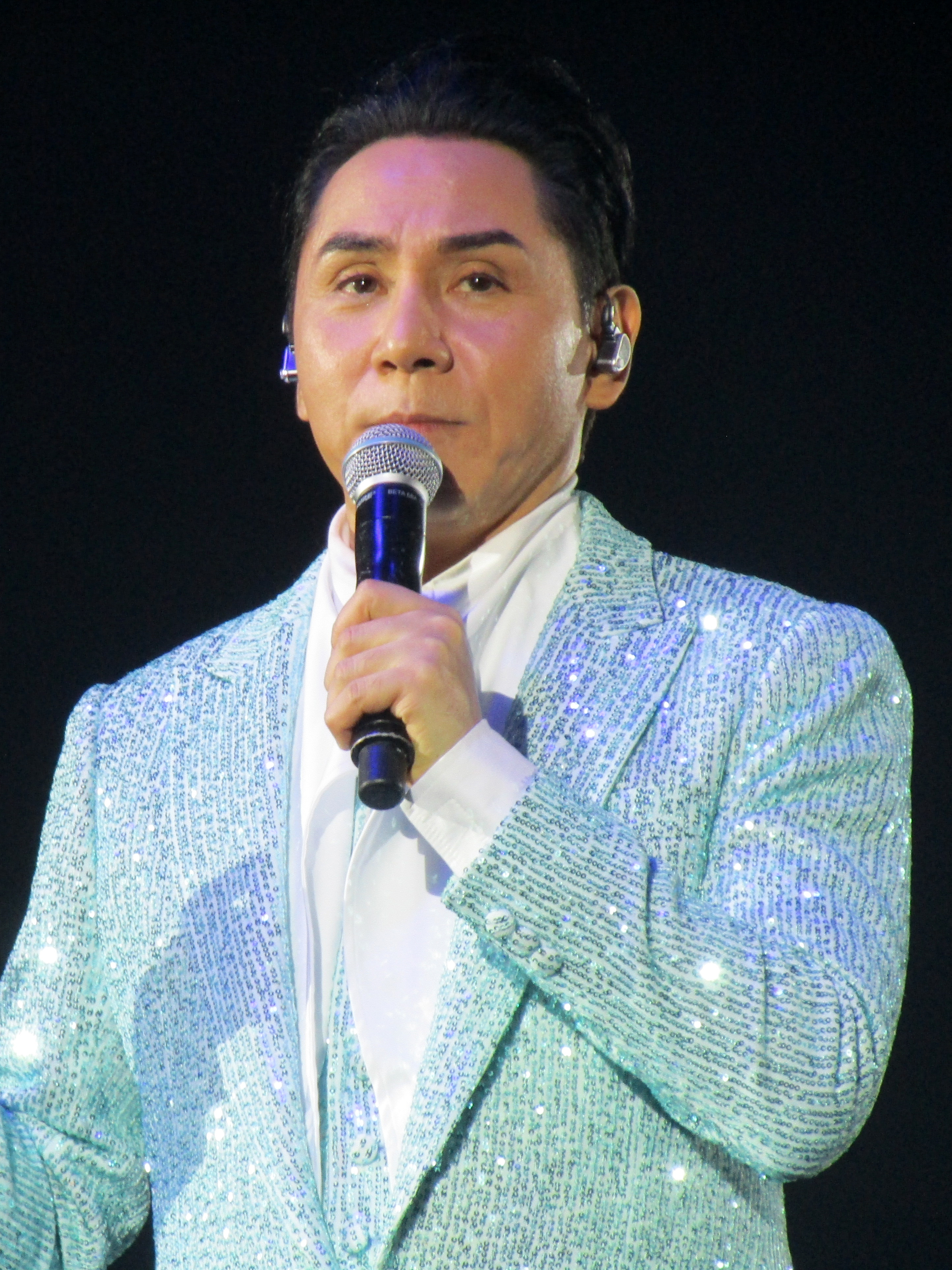
- Wong in 2023
- Born: Wong Hoi Kan; 18 November 1961 (age 64); British Hong Kong
- Citizenship: Canada; United Kingdom
- Education: New Asia College (BA)
- Occupations: Singer; songwriter; disc jockey
- Years active: 1983–present
- Musical career
- Genres: Cantopop
- Instrument: Vocals
- Labels: PolyGram; Fitto Records; Universal Music Hong Kong; Daheng Records; Gold Typhoon; Star Entertainment

Chinese name
- Chinese: 黄凯芹
- Traditional Chinese: 黃凱芹
Transcriptions
Standard Mandarin
- Hanyu Pinyin: Huáng Kǎiqín
Yue: Cantonese
- Yale Romanization: Wòhng Hói-kàhn
Southern Min
- Hokkien POJ: N̂g Khái-khîn

Signature
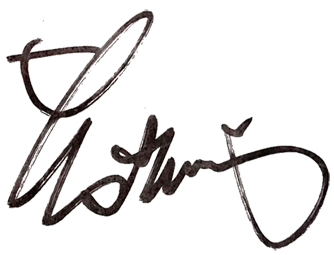

Christopher "Chris" Wong Hoi Kan (simplified Chinese: 黄凯芹; traditional Chinese: 黃凱芹; pinyin: Huáng Kǎiqín; born 18 November 1961), is a singer-songwriter and disc jockey (DJ) for love songs in Hong Kong. In the 1980s, he began his career as a DJ at RTHK. Before leaving Hong Kong's entertainment sector and heading abroad, he established himself as a singer-songwriter.

== Early life and education ==
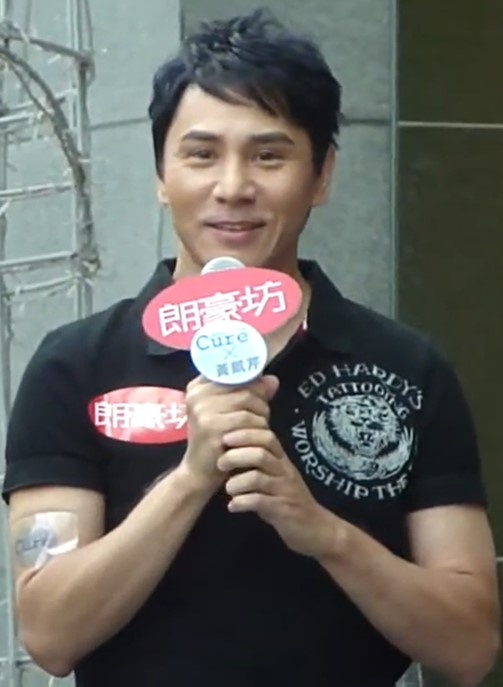
Wong at an album autograph signing at Langham Place in 2011

Wong grew up in Tai Kok Tsui, the third child in his family, with two elder and one younger brother. He studied at Cheung Chuk Shan College and worked in an advertising company after graduating from matriculation in 1980. In 1981, he went to the Chinese University of Hong Kong's New Asia College to study for a bachelor's degree in the Department of Fine Arts, but was later transferred to the Department of English in 1982. He graduated in 1985. Before joining the music scene, he worked as a program host at Radio Hong Kong.

== Career ==
In 1983, PolyGram released a single "Sword Immortal Li Bai" for him. Later, PolyGram intended to sign a contract with him, but he insisted on completing his university studies. Let it go. Joined Radio Television Hong Kong in 1984 to host classical music programs. In the following year, he was transferred to Radio Hong Kong Radio 2 as a full-time disc jockey.

On 2 August 1986, Wong participated in the 2nd Asia-Pacific Pop Music Composition Contest, which was simulcast by four channels. He participated in the competition with "Encounter" with his own lyrics, despite that he lost (the champion of this competition was the famous musician Anthony Lun, In the same year, he won the award for "Lyrics" composed by Pan Guangpei).

Since Fitto Records was only a small company at the time, it also helped him open up the Guangdong market in Mainland China, and his song "Late Autumn" is the most familiar to mainlanders. But 3 years later, due to a break with the manager company, he moved to Toronto, Canada to start a business from 1994 to 2001, and engaged in interior design work. During this period, his acting career was in a state of suspension. Andy Lau, who collaborated with the TV station, and Guo Jinan, who tried to get involved in the music scene from the TV station, wrote songs.

The "Hong Kong Philharmonic x Huang Kaiqin: One Night Love Concert" took place at the Concert Hall of the Hong Kong Cultural Center for three days straight starting on 18 October 2006; The live recording "Hong Kong Philharmonic x Huang Kaiqin: One Night Stand" was made available on 22 December. They hosted the "Double Star Love Song Concert" in the Foshan Lingnan Pearl Gymnasium on 31 December 2007 along with Tai Zhengxiao. He participated in the "Jinggewang Music Tour" in Jiangmen, Guangdong on 18 January 2008, and in May he released the album "Travel Love" in Canada, which he auctioned off to benefit charity. From 17 to 18 September 2010, "Huang Kaiqin's Good Concert" took place at the Hong Kong International Exhibition and Trade Center. On the 20th, he released his solo album "Parting," which featured the songs "So That's It" and "Good."

In 2014, he first signed with Neway Star for 2 years because his company was willing to record for him in Canada. On 17 September 2022, Huang Kaiqin held the "Listen to Huang Kaiqin 35th Anniversary Concert" at the Hong Kong Coliseum to commemorate the 35th anniversary of his debut.

== Awards ==
- 1987 Top Ten Chinese Golden Melody Newcomer Award Silver Award
- 1987 Top Ten Golden Songs Golden Melody Season Selected Golden Songs, Award-Winning Song: Sad Lover
- 1987 Top Ten Chinese Golden Melody Awards and Lyricist Award, wrote lyrics for the group RADIAS under the pseudonym "Ruoyu", winning work: Love
- 1988 Top Ten Golden Songs Golden Melody Season Selected Golden Songs, Award-Winning Song: Companion
- 1989, the Hong Kong Composers and Authors Association presented the award for the song with the highest TV broadcast rate in the year, and the winning work: Love
- 1989 Radio Television Hong Kong Most Popular DJ Award
- 1990 Top Ten Golden Songs Golden Melody Season Selected Golden Songs, Award-Winning Song: Deep Love and Shallow Relationship
- 1990 Radio Hong Kong: Most Unforgettable DJ Award
- 1990 Top Ten Golden Songs Golden Melody Season Selection Golden Song, Award-Winning Song: Please Come Back
- 1993 Hong Kong Composers and Authors Association: Radio and TV Cantonese Pop Most Widely Performed Award – Winning Song: Joke
- 1993 Hong Kong Composers and Authors Association: Radio and TV Cantonese Pop Most Widely Performed Award – Winning Song: Homemade Romance
- 2002 Top Ten Chinese Golden Melody Awards – Male Singer Silver Award

== Filmography ==
=== Film ===
- Noble Banquet (Eastern China Flood Relief Film) (1991)
- Comrade Lover (1989)

=== TV drama ===
- Love Stories (1990)
- Looking back, the Sky is Blue (Taiwan China Television) (1991)
- Zhenjin Women's Weekly Diary 2nd Series: Marriage in Fenglou (TVB Episode 6 as John) (1994)
- Regal Bay Extraordinary Love – 3652 Days of Missing (2004)
- Chimelong Dream Flying (China Guangdong Satellite TV) (2012)

=== Television ===
- You can order on weekends
- Wing On Travel Point explains how fun South Africa is (TVB, host) (1994)
- Morning Star Travel Hokkaido, Japan (TVB, host) (2004)
- Gone With the Wind (Hong Kong TV Network, narration) (2014)
- Cantonese Singing and Cantonese Sound (Guangdong Radio and Television Zhujiang Channel, Contestant) (2014)
- 2015 China Central Television 61 Evening Party (CCTV-1, CCTV-14, guest performer, singing "My Dad" (singing with Wu Yilin)) (2015)
- Watch Li Tonight (TVB, singer) (2015)
- Sunday Sound King (TVB, singer) (2015)
- 2019 China Dragon TV's Voice of China Dream "Our Song", Group B

== Discography ==
- Late Autumn (晚秋) (adapted from Chinese singer Chen Rujia's song "May You Keep Your Heart", the Mandarin version is sung by Mao Ningyuan)
- Rumor (傳聞)
- Normal heart (平常心)
- Sad lover (傷感的戀人)
- Lost Love (流離所愛) (singing with Yu Jianming)
- Deep love (情深緣淺)
- Green years (青蔥歲月)
- Unrequited feelings (沒結果的一些感情)
- Endless Love (沒結果的一些感情) (Chorus with Vivian Chow)
- Please remember me (請你記住我)
- Absolute Self (絕對自我) (Chorus with Hacken Lee)
- Fairy Tales on Earth (人間童話) (singing with Hacken Lee)
- Easy to Love, Hard to Take Back (易愛難收)
- If life waits (若生命等候) (Mandarin version "Let life wait" sung by Tong Ange)
- Passion (焚情)
- To keep you in mind (給你留念)
- One less you (少了你一個)（Mandarin version sung by Chinese singer Gao Linsheng）
- Talk that breaks my heart (傷盡我心的說話)
- Please come back (請你回來)
- Who understands love (誰明白愛)
- Lovers in the rain (雨中的戀人們) (Adapted from Japanese singer Masatoshi Nakamura's "Where Even Lovers Get Wet")
- Butterfly love flower (蝶戀花)
- No longer separate (不再分離)
- Looking at the Stars (望星星) (singing with Liu Xiaohui)
- Where the Sky Doesn't Rain (哪裡的天空不下雨) (Chorus with Liang Yanling)
- Haven't seen you for a long time (好久不見)
- Uninhabited island (無人島)
- Best Supporting Actor (最佳男配角)
- My dad (我的爸爸)
- Good (好好的)
- Long-term pain is worse than short-term pain (長痛不如短痛) (chorus with Vivian Chow)
- White age (白色年華)
- Childish (孩子氣) (singing with Wu Yilin)
- I just want to wait for you (只想等你) ("Love Love" Cantonese version, Mandarin version sung by Yang Mi)
- Joke (笑話) (with Julian Cheung)

== Books ==
- Inhuman Life (Fiction)
- Lingering Tangxi (Novel)
- Stories of Love in the World (Prose Collection): It is composed of 50 short stories with the title of "Zi", a short story "Like a Dream Order" and the prose "New York After Dusk" that was once serialized in the magazine.
- Two Seconds (Screenplay)
- Run Away From Home (Prose Collection)
- Love Night 1990 A Pair of Lonely Hearts (co-authored essays with friend Chen Haiqi)
- What to Talk About (Anthology)
- What to Say About Love (Anthology)
- Where Does Love Go – Italy Photobook (Photobook)
