= Cheung Chuk Shan College =

School in Hong Kong

Coordinates: 22.28597°N 114.1959°E

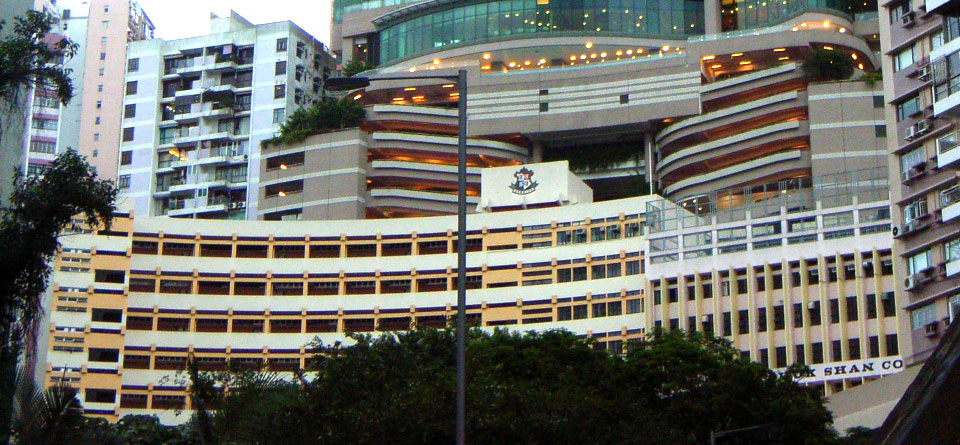

Location
- 11 Cloud View Road, North Point, Hong Kong

Information
- School type: Aided, whole-day co-educational grammar secondary school
- Motto: “Competent, Conscientious, Studious & Creative”
- Established: 1969
- Principal: Au Yeung Yick Fung Bernard
- Enrollment: Around 900
- Medium of instruction: English
- Campus Size: 4,460m²
- Website: http://www.ccsc.edu.hk

Cheung Chuk Shan College
- Traditional Chinese: 張祝珊英文中學
- Simplified Chinese: 张祝珊英文中学
Transcriptions
Standard Mandarin
- Hanyu Pinyin: Zhāng Zhùshān Yīngwén Zhōngxué
Yue: Cantonese
- Jyutping: zoeng1 zuk1 saan1 jing1 man4 zung1 hok6

Cheung Chuk Shan College is an aided, whole-day co-educational grammar secondary school founded in Hong Kong in 1969 by a group of philanthropists from the 5 Districts Business Welfare Association.

The School is named after Cheung Chuk Shan (1882 – 1936), a merchant from Siyi area of Southern Guangdong in the early 20th century.

== History ==
10 Sept 1969	Official opening of the School for operation
6 Oct 1970	Inauguration Ceremony by Governor Sir David Trench
2 Mar 1972	1st Sports Day
1 Sept 1972	Opening of matriculation course
22 Nov 1972	1st Speech Day
1 Sept 1976	Retirement of Mr. Law Chung Hung and succession of Mr. Leung Sau Chi as Principal
4 Dec 1978	10th Anniversary Celebration Dinner
27 Apr 1979	Appointment of Mrs. Irene Cheung Yok Luen as Supervisor of the School
4 May 1983	Formation of Old Students’ Association
28 Sept 1984	1st Swimming Gala
15 Dec 1985	1st Parents’ Day
3 Dec 1988	20th Anniversary Nite
16 Dec 1988	20th Anniversary Open Day Opening Ceremony
8 Apr 1989	20th Anniversary Alumni Reunion Dinner
29 Oct 1993	Formation of Students’ Association
12 Dec 1993	25th Anniversary Open Day-cum-Parents’ Day Opening Ceremony
5 Sept 1995	Implementation of School Administration and Management System
1 Sept 1998	Launching of the Sunflower Scheme as a Quality Education Fund (QEF) Project
11 Dec 1998	30th Anniversary Open Day Opening Ceremony
17 Apr 1999	30th Anniversary Alumni Reunion Dinner
15 Jan 2000	Inauguration Ceremony of Parent-Teacher Association
1 Jun 2000	Renovation of Language Laboratory into Multimedia Learning Centre (MMLC) funded by QEF Committee
23 Nov 2000	Visit by Mrs. Fanny Law, GBS, JP, Secretary for Education & Manpower
5 Jul 2001	Opening Ceremony of MMLC
23 Apr 2002	Sir Kenneth Fung resigned as Chairman of the School Management Committee and Mr. Chan Kam Toi elected Chairman of the Committee
29 Mar 2003	School suspension for the prevention of the spread of SARS as advised by Education & Manpower Bureau (EMB)
22 Apr 2003	Resumption of school for S3 students & above
28 Apr 2003	Resumption of school for S1 & S2 students
1 Sept 2003	Resignation of Mr. Leung Sau Chi and succession of Mr. Yuen Tze Lam as Acting Principal
28 Feb 2004	35th Anniversary Nite
11 Jun 2004	35th Anniversary Alumni Reunion Dinner
1 Sept 2004	Implementation of the 6-day cycle to replace the traditional 5-day week Implementation of the QEF project - "Pleasurable Reading for Excellence"
8 July 2005	Formal locking of the time capsule
3, 8-10 & 14 Mar 2006	Conduct of the 1st External School Review by the EMB
1 Sept 2006	Succession of Mr. Chan Kam Toi to the post of School Supervisor after the resignation of Mrs. Irene Cheung Yok Luen
7 Sept 2007	Conversion of the School Management Committee into the Incorporated Management Committee
4 Oct 2007	1st election of Teacher Managers
23 Oct 2007	Establishment of the CCSC Alumni Foundation Fund
18 Nov 2007	1st election of Parent Managers
16 Dec 2007	1st election of Alumni Manager
7 Sept 2007	Conversion of the School Management Committee into the Incorporated Management Committee
20 Mar 2009	40th Anniversary Alumni Reunion Dinner
28 Mar 2009	40th Anniversary Nite
1 Sept 2010	Beginning of the alternation of the number of S1 classes in each school year between 4 and 5
29 Jun 2012	Release of the Advanced / Advanced Supplementary Level Examination results of the last batch of S7 students of the School
22 - 26 Oct & 1 Nov 2012	Conduct of the 2nd External School Review by the Education Bureau
1 Sept 2013	Retirement of Mr. Yuen Tze Lam and succession of Mr. Au Chun Keung as Principal
12 Nov 2013	45th Anniversary Opening Ceremony
25 Apr 2014	45th Anniversary Dinner
5 July 2014	45th Anniversary Nite
19 May 2018	Golden Jubilee Celebration

== Class structure ==
There are 27 classes in the School and enrollment remains steady at around 900 students. The number of S1 classes is altered between 4 and 5 on alternate school years since there would be inadequate space to accommodate 30 classes if the School accepted 5 S1 classes every year.

== Curriculum ==
Since its establishment, the School has been adopting English as the medium of instruction. Except Chinese Language, Chinese Literature, Chinese History and Putonghua, all subjects are taught in English this school year.

Subjects offered to students:

Subjects	S1	S2	S3	S4	S5	S6
Form-teacher Period	√	√	√	√	√	√
English Language	√	√	√	√	√	√
Chinese Language	√	√	√	√	√	√
Mathematics	√	√	√	√	√	√
Extended Module (M1 / M2)				√	√	√
Citizenship and Social Development				√	√	√
Life and Society (II)	√	√	√			
Project-based Learning / Independent Enquiry Study	√	√		√	√	√
Integrated Science	√	√	√			
Biology			√	√	√	√
Chemistry			√	√	√	√
Physics			√	√	√	√
Information and Communication Technology	√	√	√	√	√	√
Business, Accounting & Financial Studies			√	√	√	√
Economics			√	√	√	√
Geography	√	√	√	√	√	√
History	√	√	√	√	√	√
Tourism and Hospitality Studies				√	√	√
Chinese History	√	√	√	√	√	√
Chinese Literature				√	√	√
Putonghua	√	√	√			
Visual Arts / Art Appreciation	√	√	√	√		
Music / Music Appreciation	√	√	√	√		
Home Economics	√	√	√			
Physical Education	√	√	√	√	√	√
Reading	√	√				

== Facilities ==
Different amenities can be found within the eight-storey building of the School. There are 26 classrooms, 4 science laboratories, a multimedia learning centre, an Inno studio, a geography room, a music room, an art room, a Home economics room, a needlework room, a library, an assembly hall, an outdoor playground, a gymnasium with a bouldering wall and 2 teaching rooms. The assembly hall, all classrooms and special rooms are air-conditioned.

== List of supervisors ==
1. Mr. Cheung Yok Luen, MBE, JP (1969 – 1979)
2. Mrs. Irene Cheung Yok Luen, MBE, JP (1979 – 2006)
3. Mr. Chan Kam Toi (2006 - 2019)
4. Mr. Chow Yuet Yan Kenneth (2019 - 2022)
5. Mr. Cheung Kui Tong Raymond (2022 -)

== List of principals ==
1. Mr. Law Chung Hung (1969 – 1976)
2. Mr. Leung Sau Chi, BH, JP (1976 – 2003)
3. Mr. Yuen Tze Lam (2003 – 2013)
4. Mr. Au Chun Keung (2013 - 2025)
5. Mr. Au Yeung Yick Fung Bernard (2025 -)

== Teaching staff ==
In the school year 2015 – 16, there are 61 teachers and 60 of them are graduates of whom 23 are holders of a master's degree and 1 is a graduate of College of Education. 95% of the teachers have already received professional training.

== Extra-curricular activities ==
The School provides multifarious activities and the Free Membership Scheme encourages students to participate in activities organized by different interest groups and clubs. In addition, the School and the Cheung Chuk Shan College Alumni Foundation Fund offer different awards to students with outstanding participation records in extra-curricular activities.

Houses	Academic	Sports	Interest	Artistic	Services
Blue	Business Association	Sports Association	Astronomy Club	Art Club	Christian Fellowship
Green	Chinese Association		AYP Club	Campus TV	Community Services Student Team
Red	English Society		Backstage Team	Chinese Orchestra	IT Prefects
Yellow	Geography & Conservancy Society		Chess & Board Games Club	Drama Club	Prefect Body
	History Society		Flora & Fauna Club	Home Economics Club	Red Cross Youth Team
	Liberal Studies Association		ACG Club	Photographic Club	Student Librarian Team
	Mathematics Club		Magic Club	Music Association	Students’ Association
	Putonghua Club		Reading Club	School Choir	
	Science Club		Reporters' Club	String Orchestra	
				School Band	

== Student performance ==
In 1994, a student won the Rhodes Scholarship to study law at the University of Oxford. In 1997, the school was the top performer of all arts candidates in the Hong Kong Certificate of Education Examination (HKCEE), a student was awarded the Sir Edward Youde Memorial Medal. In 2001, a student was awarded the Sir Edward Youde Memorial Fellowship to pursue a PhD in UK. In 2002, a student procured 10 distinctions in the HKCEE. In the 2016 Hong Kong Diploma of Secondary Education Examination, impressive individual performance of a number of students was recorded, the best student securing 5 Level 5**, 1 Level 5* and 1 Level 5. The university admission rate is much higher than average in Hong Kong.

Students of the School also participate actively in extra-curricular activities, capturing various awards and prizes in the academic, aesthetic, sports and service domains. The Red Cross Youth Team of the School is especially heartening in its development by having been Overall Champion in the Red Cross Outstanding Youth Team Competition for 6 consecutive years (2010 – 16).

== Notable alumni ==
Politics

Florence Hui, SBS, JP	Undersecretary for Home Affairs of the HKSAR Government
Christopher Hui, GBS, JP	Secretary for Financial Services and the Treasury

Entertainment

Lam Ki Yan	Former actress
Wong Hoi Kan	Singer-songwriter
Ivana Wong	Cantopop Singer-songwriter
Yeung Sze Man	Actress (Shrimp head)
