= Vivian Chow =

Hong Kong singer-songwriter and actress

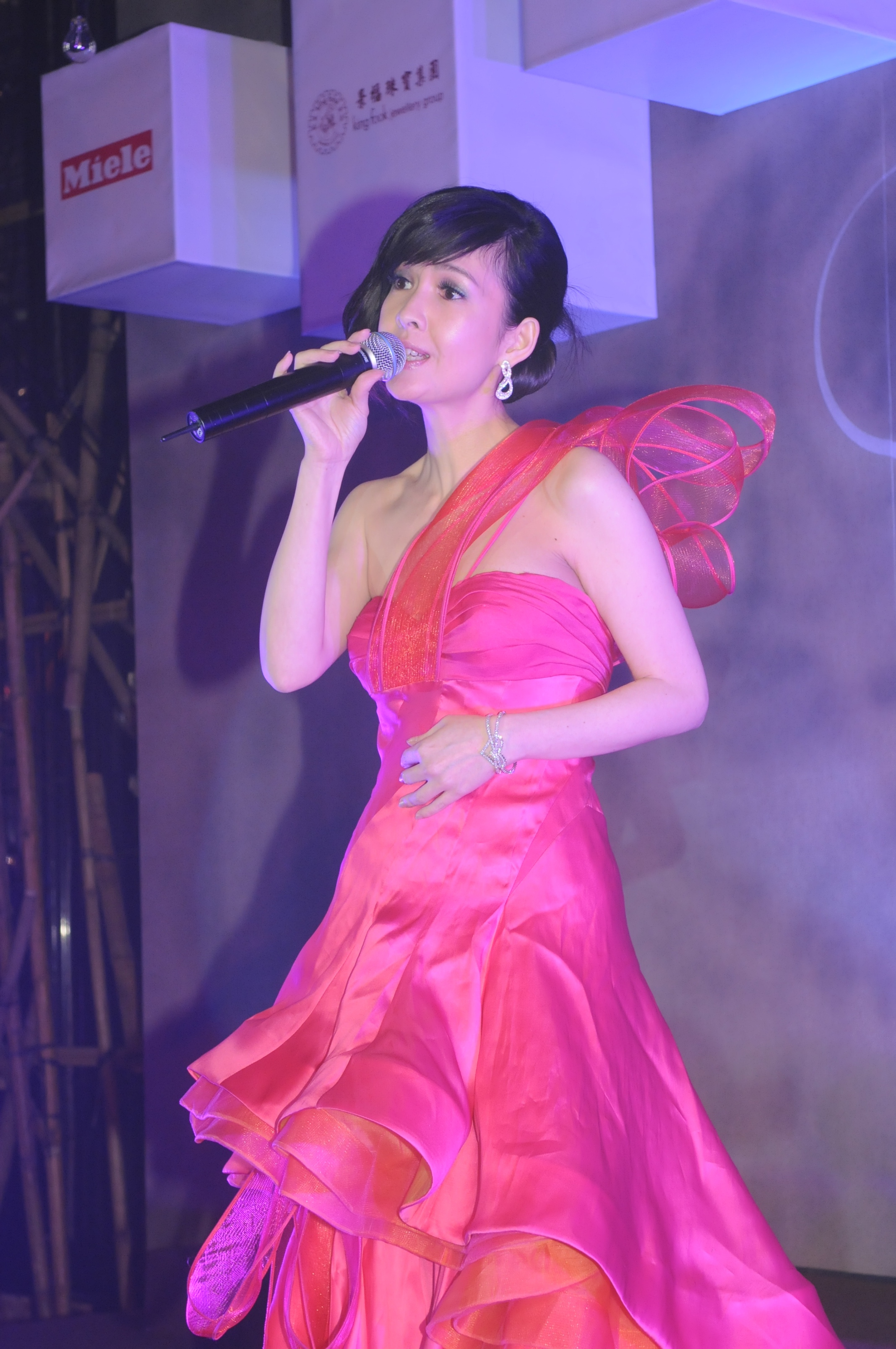
- Chow in 2011
- Born: 10 November 1967 (age 58); Hong Kong
- Occupations: Singer; actress
- Years active: 1986–1997, 2004–present
- Spouse: Joe Nieh (m. 2009)
- Awards: New Talent Singing Awards – 1986 Radio Hong Kong Radio Amateur DJ Competition runner-up

Chinese name
Transcriptions
Standard Mandarin
- Hanyu Pinyin: Zhōu Huìmǐn
Yue: Cantonese
- Jyutping: Zau1 Wai6-man5
- Musical career
- Origin: Hong Kong
- Genres: Cantopop, Mandopop, Japanese pop, Gospel
- Instrument: Piano
- Label: PolyGram (1991–1997)

Vivian Chow Wai-man (Chinese: 周慧敏, born 10 November 1967) is a Hong Kong-based Cantopop singer-songwriter and actress.

== Life and career ==
Vivian Chow is the only child in her family. Her father died before her birth due to heart disease. She was brought up by her mother and grandmother. Chow graduated from St. Stephen's Church College and gained 6th grade in piano.

Born and raised in Hong Kong, Chow entered the New Talent Singing Awards which held by TVB and Capital Artists in 1985. She began her singing and acting career by becoming the first runner-up at a freelance DJ competition held by RTHK in 1986.

=== Sancity Record (1988–1991) ===
In 1988, Chow was invited by TVB to hosted the TV music program Jade Solid Gold. Chow starred in her first film Heart to Heart and was nominated for "Best New Performer" of Hong Kong Film Awards for her role in this film. Chow also joined Sancity Record in the same year and released her debut platinum single, "Vivian", which got a platinum award.

Chow won "Best New Prospect Exceptional Award" of Top 10 Gold Songs Award in 1989. Later, she hosted the young-oriented current-affairs program Modern Era of RTHK Television with Joe Nieh.

In 1990, Chow acted in her first TV drama The Hunter's Prey and released her first and second solo album Vivian and "情迷".

=== Polygram (1991–1992) ===
Chow resigned from RTHK and started to focus on her career as a singer and actress in 1991. Chow joined Polygram and released her third Cantonese album "A Long and Lasting Love" in November.

In 1992, Chow was named as one of "Ten Artists with Healthy Image" by Commercial Radio Hong Kong. Her fourth and fifth Cantonese album Endless Dream and Winter Romance were released in the same year.

=== Polygram + Linfair (1992–1996) ===
Chow joined Linfair Record Taiwan and broke into the Taiwan market with releasing her song "Rumor" successfully in 1992. Her first Mandarin debut album "Rumor" was released in November and sold a total of more than 300,000 copies.

In 1993, Chow won 3rd place in the "Next Magazine TV Awards for Most Popular Artists" (first place of female artists) for her role on the TV drama The Greed of Man. Her second Mandarin album was released in May and got 6 platinum awards. Chow was chosen as the "Most Popular Female Artist" by Taiwan media. Later, Chow released her sixth Cantonese album "Most Love" which got double platinum award. The Cantonese featured album and the third Mandarin album Vivian & Her Mind were released in the end of year. Chow won Metro Hit Radio's "Best Female Singer-Bronze Award" and Japan NHK's "Most Popular Foreign Female Singer Award". Chow released her Japanese debut album Love Legend to broke into the Japanese market in April 1994. At the same month, Chow released her seventh Cantonese album Growing up. The fourth Mandarin album Leaving the habit of depression, eighth Cantonese album The time of red leaves drifting and Mandarin compilation album Know yourself and your enemies were also released in this year. Chow got a breakthrough in her singer career for the total selling of these Cantonese and Mandarin albums got 8 platinum awards. She was also awarded the "Most Popular Hong Kong Female Singer Award" by Japanese media.

Chow's Taiwan concert tour started at ChangHua Stadium on 11 June 1994, and continued at KaoHsiung Stadium on 18 June 1994, and Taipei Stadium on 25 June 1994. Chow returned to Hong Kong in the second half of the year, she holds 4 shows in Hong Kong Coliseum from 7–8 October and from 14–15 October.

In 1995, Chow won the award of "TVB JSG Top Ten 94 New Generation Performance (Silver)". She released her ninth Cantonese debut album A little more love in May. Her first Japanese EP was released in June. The Japanese duet "今を抱きしめて", sung with Japanese singer Asaku Yoshida, was also included in the Japanese EP and the Fifth Mandarin debut album "處處留情" which was released in July. Chow was named as one of "Asian Pop Divas" by Japanese music critics along with Faye Wong, Sandy Lam and Sally Yip and one of the "Top 10 Most Popular Performers" in China.

In 1996, Chow released her last Cantonese debut album "熱敏" in May, last Mandarin debut album Time in October and the first Mandarin featured album "周慧敏的敏感地帶" in December before her semi-retirement. She has also been elected as one of the "Top 10 worldwide celebrities on the Internet" by internet users.

=== Polygram + Taurus Records (1997–1998) ===
Chow joined Taurus Records in 1997 and released the second EP "逢いにゆきたいの" in February. She was voted as one of "Top 10 celebrities on the internet" (The #1 Chinese celebrity on the poll results). After Chow announced she would not take any entertainment jobs when she held the concert in Atlantic City in November, Polygram Hong Kong released the featured album "回憶從今天開始" which included the new song "男女之間", Japanese song "逢いにゆきたいの" and 15 Chow's Hit Songs to summarize Chow's music.

At the beginning of 1998, Taurus Records released the Japanese version of the featured album "あの日から始まった", included 18 Chow's 18 best hits including "自動自覺" and "真愛在明天".

=== Semi-retirement (1998–2003) ===
After leaving the entertainment scene, Chow moved to Vancouver with Joe Nieh and appeared in public places occasionally. She is obsessed with painting, writing and playing pool. Her painting "Old Man from San Geung" and "Looking Towards the Future" won many painting awards.

Chow and Nieh returned to Hong Kong with their cats in 2003 because the outbreak of SARS stopped them from returning to Canada. Chow revealed the reason she stopped her entertainment career in 1997 in TVB talk show "Queen's Feast". "My TV, movie, agency and record contracts all expired in 1997, so she tried to gain life experiences outside of the entertainment and music industries.

=== Back to stage (2004–) ===
In 2004, Chow launched her first book My Cat Son Pal Chow which quickly sold more than 20,000 books and was also in the top 10 best-selling books for several months. Chow was also invited to be Shiseido spokesperson for the Asia region in the same year. After back to entertainment scene, Chow works as part-time and obsesses with community services. She worked with World Vision Hong Kong, Oxfam, Hong Kong AIDS Foundation, Cancer Fund, Society for Abandoned Animals Limited (SAA) and Non-Profit Making Veterinary Service Society (NPV) to promote taking care of the social vulnerable group through her social influence.

Chow returned to the Hong Kong Coliseum to perform in her "Back for Love" concert on 25–27 May 2006 after she stepped on this stage twelve years ago. She donated all of the rewards she got for the 3 concerts to NPV to raise money for establishing a veterinary clinic which grand opened on Chow's birthday in the same year.

=== 25th anniversary of debut (2011–2013) ===
Chow held the concert "Deep V.25" on 19–20 March 2011 at Hong Kong Coliseum and released the anniversary EP "Potted Plants" to celebrate her 25th anniversary of debut. The appearance of Sean Lau in the concert surprised Chow and the audiences because it was the first reunion of this pair of main characters in famous TV drama The Greed of Man. It was a few days after Fukushima Daiichi nuclear disaster and 2011 Tōhoku earthquake and tsunami, when Yoshie Kashiwabara came to Hong Kong as one of her special guests, Chow also decided to sell her CD's and the souvenirs designed by Leo Ku, with all proceeds given to charity for the Japanese Relief Funds. Chow's cat sons Pal Chow and Chu Jai were passed away a month before the concert.

After the concert in Hong Kong, Chow started the world tour "Vivian Chow Journey of Love".

In 2013, Chow started her own talent agency, V Vision Workshop Limited. Her agent is Lorraine Chan (Leo Ku's wife) a talent agent.

=== Film and gospel album (2014–) ===
In 2014, Chow starred in Taiwanese movie Cafe. Waiting. Love which was released on 15 August 2014 in Hong Kong and Taiwan. The movie had a positive reception in both places. The box office reached 20 million in Hong Kong and 200 million in Taiwan. Chow was invited to sing the theme song "咖啡在等一個人" which was included in the movie soundtrack.

Chow's first gospel album HIM was released on 18 December 2014. The album was produced by Chow and issued by Emperor Group Music and Linfair Record Limited. The English song "A Love Like This" was composed by Chow is about how her faith changed her life. Chow started to participate in different forms of sermons to share Christian testimony after the album's release.

== Personal life ==
Chow's first love was her high school colleague. She started a relationship with the vocalist of Raidas, Chan Duk Cheung, when she worked in RTHK. This lasted for a few years. Later, Chow met Joe Nieh, the son of famous novelist Ni Kuang in a RTHK television programme in 1989 and they parted amicably in 1992. Chow met Ka Sen when she was in a Kao advertising shooting. After a two-year long-distance relationship, they broke up in 1995. Chow and Joe Nieh were back together in 1997 and married on 5 January 2009. They both become Christians in 2010 and joined an English-speaking local church in Hong Kong.

== Filmography ==
=== Television (TVB) ===
Year	Title	Role	Co-Star	Notes
1990	The Hunter's Prey 烏金血劍	唐劍兒	Canti Lau, Gallen Lo, Eddie Cheung, Gordon Liu, Stella Wang	
1991	The Commandments 武林幸運星	曲楚楚	Deric Wan, Cutie Mui, Lisa Lui, Tsui Ga Bo, Wong Yat Fei	
1992	The Greed of Man	阮 梅 台：小猶太	Adam Cheng, Sean Lau, David Siu, Yammie Lam, Amy Kwok	
1992	Rage and Passion	程若詩 (Guest appearance)	Ekin Cheng, Gallen Lo, Eddie Kwan, Wayne Lai, Fiona Leung	
1995	A Stage of Turbulence 刀馬旦	周玉茹/沈菊仙	Sunny Chan, Patrick Tam, Roman Tam, Joyce Koi, Fiona Leung	

=== Television (Taiwan) ===
Year	Title	Role	Co-Star	Notes
1994	新包青天之滴血紅梅	(Guest appearances)	Jin Chao-chun, Kenny Ho, Leo Ku, Esther Kwan	

=== Film ===
Based on the title name in Cantonese:

Year	Title	Role	Co-Star	Notes
1988	Goodbye Hero 玩命雙雄	孟冬的妹妹	David Wu, Derek Yee, Petrina Fung	Taiwan: 虎鷹特勤組
1988	Heart to Hearts 三人世界	毛慧敏; Vivian	George Lam, Carol Cheng, Michael Chow, Rosamund Kwan	
1989	Happy Together	Candy	Lawrence Cheng, Kenny Chung, Cherie Chung, Chingmy Yau	
1989	The Yuppie Fantasia		Lawrence Cheng, Carol Cheng, Cherie Chung, Elizabeth Lee	Guest appearance
1989	Path of Glory 沖天小子		Adam Cheng, Wilson Lam, Max Mok, Christopher Chen	
1989	The Romancing Star III	阿 敏	James Wong, Andy Lau, Sharla Cheung, Chingmy Yau	
1990	Unmatchable Match 風雨同路	周文麗; Mandy	Stephen Chow, Charlie Chan, Shing Fui On, Karel Wong	
1990	Heart Into Hearts 三人新世界	毛慧敏; Vivian	George Lam, Carol Cheng, Maggie Cheung, Suki Kwan	
1990	Girls Without Tomorrow 1992	方小玲	Carina Lau, May Lo, Pauline Chan, Petrina Fung	Taiwan: 現代應召女郎
1991	Devil's Vendetta 妖魔道	彩 衣	Stanley Fung, Joe Nieh, Sharla Cheung, Michelle Sze	
1991	The Perfect Match	Philidonna	Jacky Cheung, George Lam, Maggie Cheung, Lydia Shum	
1991	Fruit Punch; Yes!一族	Yoko	Leon Lai, Hacken Lee, The Grasshopper	Taiwan: 菜鳥大亨
1992	Fun and Fury 痴情快婿	馬青霞	Leon Lai, Kent Cheng, Frankie Chan, Sharon Kwok	Taiwan: 賊探世家
1992	Heart Against Hearts 三人做世界	毛慧敏; Vivian	George Lam, Carol Cheng, Maggie Cheung, Rosamund Kwan	
1992	Arrest the Restless 藍江傳之反飛組風雲	梁小敏	Leslie Cheung, Charles Heung, Deanie Ip, Alex To	Taiwan: 整人探長：藍江傳
1992	Angel Hunter 女校風雲之邪教入侵	Vivian Chow	Sean Lau, Anthony Wong, Ng Man Tat, Carrie Ng	
1992	Summer Lover 夏日情人	阿 敏	Max Mok, Alfred Cheung, Loletta Lee, Veronica Yip	
1992	Stone Man 石頭記	紅 伶	Wilson Lam, Ng Ma, Paul Chun, Lau Shun	Taiwan: 紅伶名劍
1993	Tom, Dick and Hairy	Francis	Tony Leung, Lawrence Cheng, Anita Yuen, Athena Chu	Guest appearance
1993	No Regret, No Return 走上不歸路	方思維	Max Mok, Kenneth Tsang, Karel Wong, Ridley Tsui	
1994	The Kung Fu Scholar	程 晴	Dicky Cheung, Aaron Kwok, Ng Mang Tat, Bryan Leung	Taiwan: 流氓狀元
1994	Family Affairs 清官難審	小 查	Kenny Ho, Jin Chao-chun, Karen Mok, Rain Lau	
1994	To Love Ferrari 我愛法拉利	周小敏	David Siu, 朱永龍, Mark Kwok, 趙繼純	
1996	Top Banana Club 金裝香蕉俱樂部	Jenny	Anthony Wong, Dayo Wong, Cheung Tat Ming, Esther Kwan	
1996	Out of the Blur 廢話小說	巴士乘客	Jacky Cheung, Leon Lai, Shirley Kwan, William So	Guest appearance
2010	All About Love	Anita	Sandra Ng, William Chan, Eddie Cheung	Leading Actress
2011	Wasao	節子		Voice Acting
2014	Café. Waiting. Love	老闆娘	Vivian Sung, Hung Chih Han, Megan Lai	Guest appearance

=== Television film ===
Year	Title	Role	Co-Star	Notes
1991	Fire On Ice 血染黎明		Eddie Kwan, 劉秀萍	
1992	Tulips in August 八月鬱金香		Sean Lau, Brian Wong, Joseph Lee	

=== Musical television film ===
Year	Title	Role	Co-Star	Notes
1993	驀然回首	阿欣 (Hacken Lee's younger sister)	Anita Yuen, Gordon Lam, Dickson Li, Lawrence Cheng, Jacky Cheng, Cally Kwong	Guest appearance in Hacken Lee's musical television film
2006	愛得太遲	花店東主	Leo Ku, Kathy Chow, Jan Lamb, Danny Chan	

=== Special edition (TV) ===
Year	Title
2011	《周慧敏·最愛V25》(Leo Ku, Linda Wong, William So, Louis Yuen as guests)

=== Radio drama ===
Year	Title
May 1992	兩個他 (RTHK)
July 1994	蘭茜夫人劇場：讓我愛你一個夏天 (Commercial Radio Hong Kong)
August 1994	終站 (RTHK)

=== Radio DJ/TV show host ===
==== RTHK ====
Year	Title
1987	青春新幹線
1987	青春交響曲
1987	青春太陽族
1987	70200 DJ 大本營
1987	開心隊
1988	輕談淺唱不夜天
1989	摩登時代
1989	二人世界
1989	青蔥歲月
1990	十大中文金曲
	兩小無賴
	攴攴齋叱咤榜
	妹寶妹寶
	敏感時間
	話點就點
	彩雲曲
	兩顆心

==== TVB ====
Year	Title
1989	十大勁歌金曲
1989	勁歌金曲
1992	兒歌金曲頒獎典禮

=== TV show ===
Year	Title
1995	《RTHK》, 《TVB》（群星匯正音 1995）第2, 4–5集
7 Oct, 2004	《中天綜合台》（Kangsi Coming）接近仙女的玉女
2 Mar, 2012	《中天綜合台》（Kangsi Coming）永遠不老的周慧敏又來了
7 Oct, 2012	《中天綜合台》（Kangsi Coming）接近仙女的玉女 周慧敏
1 Sept, 2014	《中天綜合台》（Kangsi Coming）玉女掌門人老闆娘初體驗
23 Feb, 2015	《中天綜合台》（Kangsi Coming）90年代我們一起追的偶像
22 Aug, 2015	快樂大本營
14 Oct, 2018	ViuTV Goodnight Show - King Maker Final Competition - Judge

== Discography ==
=== Album ===
Album	Release date	Labels	Track listing
Vivian Chow	Nov 1988	Sancity Records	1. 創造未來; 2. 不變的心; 3. 被動者; 4. 台下女主角
Vivian Chow	Apr 1990	Sancity Records	1. 不羈女神; 2. 舊情人; 3. 在這遙遠的地方; 4. 不再衝動; 5. 不變的謊言; 6. 人間有緣; 7. 星河; 8. 詛咒; 9. 讓我知道; 10. 情感的結; 11. 創造未來; 12. 不變的心; 13. 被動者; 14. 台下女主角
情迷	Dec 1990	Sancity Records	1. 情迷; 2. 鋼線之舞; 3. 借歪; 4. 可知我想他; 5. 有你明白我; 6. Shut Up; 7. 留我一聲; 8. 一點情狂; 9. 飛越瘋人院; 10. 鏡上的唇印
A Long & Lasting Love	Oct 1991	PolyGram	1. 天荒愛未老; 2. 真愛在明天 -Vivian Chow & Leon Lai (Duet); 3. 痴戀; 4. 心裡的對象; 5. 野性的心; 6. 等這一段情; 7. 情到最後; 8. 藍調怨曲; 9. 誰能像我癡; 10. 千個晨早
Endless Dream	June 1992	PolyGram	1. 公開我的愛; 2. 歲月的童話; 3. 愛你多過愛他; 4. 怎可以沒有感情; 5. 動人黃昏; 6. 擁抱吧; 7. 如果你知我苦衷; 8. 情本在意; 9. 情歸何處; 10. 風花煙雨間
周慧敏真情精選	1992	Sancity Records	1. 在這遙遠的地方 4:43; 2. 舊情人 4:34; 3. 台下女主角 3:46; 4. 有你明白我 4:49; 5. 星河 3:44; 6. 借歪 4:33; 7. 鋼線之舞 3:44; 8. 不羈女神 4:02; 9. 可知我想他 4:52; 10. SHUT UP 4:29; 11. 一點情狂 5:02; 12. 詛咒 4:35; 13. 不再衝動 3:35; 14. 情迷 4:44
流言 (Mandarin)	Nov 1992	Linfair Records	1. 流言 – Vivian Chow & Kevin Lin 4:06; 2. 近情情怯 4:20; 3. 從情人變成朋友 4:13; 4. 失眠 4:19; 5. 年月天夜 2:39; 6. 交換心事 4:22; 7. 疑問句 3:13; 8. 跟愛情說聲再見 4:17; 9. 新娘的眼淚 4:30; 10. 講不出嘴 2:51
冬日浪漫	Jan 1993	PolyGram	1. 冬日浪漫; 2. 聖誕夜纏綿; 3. 自作多情; 4. 孤單的心痛; 5. 阿瑪遜何; 6. 注定的結局; 7. 錯 8. 忘記一個你; 9. INVITE ME TO DANCE; 10. 多一點, 多一變; 11. 冬日浪漫 (Mood Music)
浪漫 (冬日浪漫-Taiwan Version)	Feb 1993	Linfair Records	1. 浪漫; 2. 夜綿綿; 3. 自作多情; 4. 孤單的心痛; 5. 阿瑪遜河; 6. 註定的結局; 7. 錯 8. 忘記一個你; 9. INVITE ME TO DANCE; 10. 多一點，多一遍; 11. 浪漫 (Mood Music)
盡在不言中 (Mandarin)	May 1993	Linfair Records	1. 盡在不言中 4:14; 2. 感激 4:32; 3. 愛你的話不必多說 4:17; 4. 你是真的愛我嗎 5:03; 5. 等一次真心 4:48; 6. 一顆心只能愛一回 5:10; 7. 還我一個不怕黑的夜 4:58; 8. 有話的心 4:37; 9. 愛得剛好 4:13; 10. 最怕唱起這首歌 5:57
最愛	Sept 1993	PolyGram	1. 自動自覺; 2. 最愛; 3. 付出許多的愛情; 4. 別望著我離開; 5. 對不起,親愛的; 6. 你還記得從前嗎; 7. (為何)偷偷摸摸; 8. 夢裡伊人; 9. 悲哀搖擺; 10. 一個人在途上; 11. 留住秋色 – Vivian Chow & Jacky Cheung (Duet)
最愛 (Taiwan Version)	Oct 1993	Linfair Records	1. (為何) 偷偷摸摸; 2. 最愛; 3. 付出許多的愛情; 4. 別望著我離開; 5. 你還記得從前嗎; 6. 留住秋色 – Vivian Chow & Jacky Cheung (Duet); 7. 夢裡伊人; 8. 自動自覺; 9. 悲哀搖擺; 10. 一個人在途上; 11. 對不起,親愛的
自動自覺	1993	PolyGram	1. 自動自覺 (Erotic Mix); 2. 自作多情; 3. 天荒愛未老; 4. 愛你多過愛他
心事重重 (Mandarin)	Dec 1993	Linfair Records	1. 沒有人傻得像我 4:36; 2. 心事重重 4:32; 3. 當我愛上一個人 4:17; 4. 愛你多年 4:31; 5. 愛我所愛 4:23; 6. 你的愛讓我想飛 5:14; 7. 平凡 4:30; 8. 點一杯回憶 4:07; 9. 用眼神將我淹沒 4:00; 10. 收回愛情逃進回憶 4:28
新曲+精選	Dec 1993	PolyGram	1. 戀曲Sha la la 2. 痴心換情深; 3. 如果你知我苦衷; 4. 天荒愛未老; 5. 孤單的心痛; 6. 真愛在明天 – Vivian Chow & Leon Lai (Duet); 7. 愛你多過愛他; 8. 自動自覺 (Erotic Mix); 9. 最愛 (Piano Version); 10. 阿瑪遜河; 11. 流言 – Vivian Chow & Kevin Lin (Duet); 12. 情未了 – Vivian Chow & Christopher Wong (Duet); 13. 自作多情
純愛傳說 (新曲+精選- Japanese Version)	Apr 1994	PolyGram	1. 戀曲 Sha La La; 2. 痴心換情深; 3. 如果你知我苦衷; 4. 天荒愛未老; 5. 孤單的心痛; 6. 真愛在明天 – Vivian Chow & Leon Lai (Duet); 7. 愛你多過愛他; 8. 自動自覺 (Erotic Mix); 9. 最愛 (Piano Version); 10. 阿瑪遜河; 11. 流言- Vivian Chow & Kevin Lin (Duet); 12. 情未了- Vivian Chow & Christopher Wong (Duet); 13. 自作多情; 14. 你還記得從前嗎; 15. 自動自覺
成長	Apr 1994	PolyGram	1. 成長; 2. 感情的分禮; 3. 異國的下午; 4. 留戀; 5. 情人夢都市; 6. 其實那個不是我; 7. 沒愛一身輕; 8. 心軟; 9. 愛到最後 – Vivian Chow & Leon Lai (Duet); 10. 雨天...... (的來電); 11. 愛的成長
感情的分禮	June 1994	PolyGram	1. 感情的分禮 (Remix); 2. 付出許多的愛情; 3. 註定的結局; 4. 留住秋色 – Vivian Chow & Jacky Cheung (Duet)
離開憂鬱的習慣 (Mandarin)	June 1994	Linfair Records	1. 離開憂鬱的習慣 4:26; 2. I've never been to me 4:00; 3. 看海 4:32; 4. 看著我的眼 5:05; 5. 陪在你身邊 4:34; 6. Dancing in the night 4:59; 7. 心動 4:54; 8. 看不清那一個是真正的自己 3:49; 9. 留些愛到明天愛我 4:43; 10. OH!別說 4:14
紅葉落索的時候......	Nov 1994	PolyGram	1. 紅葉落索的時候; 2. 假裝; 3. 思念的夜空; 4. 平凡人的夢; 5. 送給季節; 6. 天使的情人; 7. 你最愛是你; 8. 千色派對; 9. 鏡中的怨女; 10. 只等這一季
假裝	1994	PolyGram	1. 假裝 (Cha Cha Mix 60's Version); 2. 只等這一季; 3. 離開憂鬱的習慣; 4. 最愛
知己知彼 (Mandarin)	Dec 1994	Linfair Records	1. 知己 – Vivian Chow & Samuel Tai (Duet); 2. 走在大街的女子 – Vivian Chow & 陳耀川 (Duet); 3. 愛到最後 – Vivian Chow & Leon Lai (Duet); 4. 情未了 – Vivian Chow & Christopher Wong (Duet); 5. 仰慕 – Vivian Chow & Joshua Chen (Duet); 6. 留住秋色 – Vivian Chow & Jacky Cheung (Duet); 7. 真愛在明天 – Vivian Chow & Leon Lai (Duet); 8. 萬千寵愛在一身 – Vivian Chow & Hacken Lee (Duet); 9. 流言 – Vivian Chow & Kevin Lin (Duet)
'94美的化身演唱會	1995	PolyGram	Disc 1: 1. Opening; 2. Medley; 3. 台下女主角; 4. 如果你知我苦衷; 5. 美少女戰士 – - Vivian Chow, Linda Wong & Karen Tong; 6. Cartoon Medly; 7. 沒有人傻得像我; 8. 自作多情; 9. 痴心換情深; 10. 注定的結局; 11. 最愛 (Japanese); 12. 可知我想他; Disc 2: 1. 怎可以沒有感情; 2. 心軟; 3. 自動自覺; 4. 阿瑪遜河; 5. 感情的分禮; 6. 愛你多過愛他; 7. 只等這一季; 8. 留戀; 9. 假裝; 10. 孤單的心痛; 11. 天荒愛未老; 12. 紅河村
多一點愛戀	May 1995	PolyGram	1. 新相識舊情人; 2. 要你喜歡我; 3. 花雨煙雲; 4. 多一點愛戀; 5. 會錯意; 6. 喜歡一個; 7. 留住有情人; 8. 失控; 9. 男人心 – Vivian Chow & Shirley Kwan (Duet); 10. 情深到未來; 11. 童年來探我; 12. 知己 (Cantonese) – Vivian Chow & Samuel Tai (Duet)
要你喜歡我	1995	PolyGram	1. 要你喜歡我 (Remix); 2. 會錯意 (Remix); 3. 思念的夜空; 4. 只等這一季
眠れぬ夜 (Japanese)	June 1995	PolyGram	1. 眠れぬ夜; 2. 不相信愛情; 3. 眠れぬ夜 Karaoke; 4. 不相信愛情 Karaoke
處處留情 (Mandarin)	July 1995	Linfair Records	1. 深情不露 4:21; 2. 處處留情 4:30; 3. 沒有你的春天 4:20; 4. 把心叠上你的心 4:29; 5. 全部 4:30; 6. 保護 4:04; 7. 這是我所願 4:21; 8. 承認愛 4:40; 9. 離開你好難 4:01; 10. 現在擁抱我 (Japanese) – Vivian Chow & Asaku Yoshida (Duet) 4:19
情迷心竅	Dec 1995	PolyGram	1. 紅顏知己; 2. 敏感夜; 3. 情迷心竅; 4. 失眠之夜 (Japanese); 5. 現在擁抱我 (Japanese) – Vivian Chow & Asaku Yoshida (Duet); 6. 要你喜歡我; 7. 紅葉落索的時候; 8. 知己 (Mandarin) – Vivian Chow & Samuel Tai (Duet); 9. 會錯意; 10. 感情的分禮; 11. 留戀; 12. 只等這一季; 13. 離開憂鬱的習慣; 14. 假裝; 15. 處處留情; 16. 心軟
寶麗金88極品音色系列	1996	PolyGram	1. 敏感夜 3:31; 2. 如果你知我苦衷 4:21; 3. 天荒愛未老 3:14; 4. 自作多情 5:19; 5. 孤單的心痛 4:04; 6. 愛你多過愛他 4:02; 7. 只等這一季 4:45; 8. 留戀 4:59; 9. 紅葉落索的時候 4:33; 10. 痴心換情深 4:18; 11. 自動自覺 4:04; 12. 保護 4:06; 13. 最愛 4:25; 14. 假裝 3:41; 15. 會錯意 3:51; 16. 要你喜歡我 4:23; 17. 情未了 – Vivian Chow & Christopher Wong (Duet) 4:24
擁抱真情VCD (Mandarin)	Jan 1996	Linfair Records	
熱·敏	June 1996	PolyGram	1. 私奔; 2. 也許應該分手了; 3. 出嫁的清晨; 4. C'est la vie 5. 情不必擁有; 6. 每一次遠行; 7. 古老病態; 8. 為你; 9. Am I really in love 10. 稀客
時間 (Mandarin)	Oct 1996	Linfair Records	1. 時間; 2. 最美的淚水; 3. 心不在焉; 4. 愛當真; 5. 好女人; 6. 你對我是認真的嗎; 7. 全心全意; 8. 品嚐; 9. 是否你會說愛我; 10. 有了愛
周慧敏的敏感地帶 (Mandarin)	Dec 1996	Linfair Records	1. 流言 – Vivian Chow & Kevin Lin (Duet); 2. 盡在不言中; 3. 心事重重; 4. 沒有人傻得像我; 5. 處處留情; 6. 保護; 7. 留住秋色 – Vivian Chow & Jacky Cheung (Duet); 8. 最美的淚水; 9. 感激; 10. 離開憂鬱的習慣; 11. 近情情怯; 12. 從情人變成朋友; 13. I've never been to me 14. 真愛在明天 – Vivian Chow & Leon Lai (Duet)
逢いにゆきたいの (Japanese)	Feb 1997	Taurus Records	1. 逢いにゆきたいの; 2. 別れの予感; 3. 逢いにゆきたいの (Original Karaoke); 4. 別れの予感 (Original Karaoke)
回憶從今天開始	Dec 1997	PolyGram	1. 男女之間; 2. I've never been to me 3. Sometimes when we touch – Vivian Chow & Samuel Tai (Duet); 4. C'est la vie 5. 自作多情; 6. 最愛; 7. 流言; 8. 愛當真; 9. 如果你知我苦衷; 10. 知己; 11. 離開憂鬱的習慣; 12. 現在擁抱我; 13. 孤單的心痛; 14. 紅葉落索的時候; 15. 天荒愛未老; 16. 逢いにゆきたいの
萬千寵愛30首	1998	PolyGram	Disc 1: 1. C'est la vie 2. 出嫁的清晨; 3. 也許應該分手了; 4. 只等這一季; 5. 紅葉落索的時侯; 6. 知己 (Cantonese) – Vivian Chow & Samuel Tai (Duet); 7. 會錯意; 8. 紅顏知己; 9. 要你喜歡我; 10. 假裝; 11. 感情的分禮; 12. 留戀; 13. 愛到最後 – Vivian Chow & Leon Lai (Duet); 14. 自動自覺; 15. 動人黃昏; Disc 2: 1. 天荒愛未老; 2. 出嫁的清晨; 3. 如果你知我苦衷; 4. 孤單的心痛; 5. 自作多情; 6. 冬日浪漫; 7. 真愛在明天 – Vivian Chow & Leon Lai (Duet); 8. 愛你多過愛他; 9. 流言 – Vivian Chow & Kevin Lin (Duet); 10. 戀曲Sha la la 11. 痴心換情深; 12. 情未了 – Vivian Chow & Christopher Wong (Duet); 13. 付出許多的愛情; 14. 怎可以沒有感情; 15. 萬千寵愛在一身 – Vivian Chow & Hacken Lee (Duet)
一個美麗的傳說 CD+VCD	1999	Universal Music (Hong Kong)	CD: 1. 孤單的心痛; 2. 如果你知我苦衷; 3. 自作多情; 4. 萬千寵愛在一身 – 周Vivian Chow & Hacken Lee (Duet); 5. 天荒愛未老; 6. 戀曲SHA LA LA; 7. 自動自覺; 8. 假裝; 9. 流言 – Vivian Chow & Kevin Lin (Duet); 10. 紅葉落索的時候; 11. 愛你多過愛他; 12. 要你喜歡我; 13. 情未了 – Vivian Chow & Christopher Wong (Duet); 14. 只等這一季; 15. 新相識 舊情人; 16. 最愛 (Piano Version); VCD: 1. 最愛; 2. C'est la vie 3. 為你; 4. 出嫁的清晨; 5. 紅葉落索的時候; 6. 假裝; 7. 感情的分禮; 8. 痴心換情深; 9. 自作多情; 10. 自動自覺; 11. 會錯意; 12. 天荒愛未老; 13. 愛你多過愛他; 14. 如果你知我苦衷; 15. 流言 – Vivian Chow & Kevin Lin (Duet)
環球2000超巨星系列	Jan 2000	Universal Music (Hong Kong)	1. 最愛; 2. 出嫁的清晨; 3. 如果你知我苦衷; 4. 感情的分禮; 5. 癡心換情深; 6. C'EST LA VIE; 7. 盡在不言中; 8. 離開憂鬱的習慣; 9. 會錯意; 10. 心軟; 11. 留戀; 12. 處處留情 (Mandarin); 13. 從情人變成朋友; 14. 失控; 15. 多一點愛戀; 16. 留住有情人
真經典	Aug 2001	Universal Music (Hong Kong)	1. 最愛; 2. 孤單的心痛; 3. 真愛在明天 – Vivian Chow & Leon Lai (Duet); 4. 會錯意; 5. 知己 (Cantonese) – Vivian Chow & Samuel Tai (Duet); 6. 痴心換情深; 7. 流言 – Vivian Chow & Kevin Lin (Duet); 8. 如果你知我苦衷; 9. 自作多情; 10. 天荒愛未老; 11. 萬千寵愛在一身 – Vivian Chow & Hacken Lee (Duet); 12. 感情的分禮; 13. 男女之間; 14. 男人心 – Vivian Chow & Shirley Kwan (Duet); 15. 情未了 – Vivian Chow & Christopher Wong (Duet); 16. 紅葉落索的時候
失物招領：周慧敏精選 (Mandarin)	Dec 2002	Linfair Records	CD 1: 1. 盡在不言中; 2. 流言 – Vivian Chow & Kevin Lin (Duet); 3. 感激; 4. 心事重重; 5. 離開憂鬱的習慣; 6. 知己 – Vivian Chow & Samuel Tai (Duet); 7. 從情人變成朋友; 8. 看著我的眼; 9. 沒有人傻得像我; 10. 愛你多年; CD 2: 1. 處處留情; 2. 保護; 3. 你對我是認真的嗎; 4. 最美的淚水; 5. 時間; 6. Dancing in the night 7. 一顆心只能愛一回; 8. 你的愛讓我想飛; 9. 深情不露; 10. 全心全意
環球DSD視聽之王	Apr 2003	Universal Music (Hong Kong)	CD: 1. 天荒愛未老; 2. 孤單的心痛; 3. 情未了 – Vivian Chow & Christopher Wong (Duet); 4. 萬千寵愛在一身 – Vivian Chow & Hacken Lee (Duet); 5. 男女之間; 6. 男人心 – Vivian Chow & Shirley Kwan (Duet); 7. 出嫁的清晨; 8. 如果你知我苦衷; 9. 感情的分禮; 10. 痴心換情深; 11. 留戀; 12. 也許應該分手了; 13. 動人黃昏; 14. 冬日浪漫; 15. 怎可以沒有感情; 16. 留住有情人; DVD: 1. 天荒愛未老; 2. 孤單的心痛; 3. 情未了 – - Vivian Chow & Christopher Wong (Duet); 4. 如果你知我苦衷; 5. 感情的分禮
Back for you	Mar 2006	Universal Music (Hong Kong)	CD1: 1. 台下女主角; 2. 在這遙遠的地方; 3. 人間有緣; 4. 星河; 5. 情迷; 6. 鋼線之舞; 7. 可知我想他; 8. 天荒愛未老; 9. 真愛在明天 – Vivian Chow & Leon Lai (Duet); 10. 千個晨早; 11. 歲月的童話; 12. 愛你多過愛他; 13. 怎可以沒有感情; 14. 動人黃昏; 15. 如果你知我苦衷; 16. 流言 – Vivian Chow & Kevin Lin (Duet); CD2: 1. 自作多情; 2. 孤單的心痛; 3. 阿瑪遜河; 4. 注定的結局; 5. 會錯意; 6. 只等這一季; 7. 盡在不言中; 8. 自動自覺 (Erotic Mix); 9. 最愛; 10. 感情的分禮; 11. 留戀; 12. 心軟; 13. 戀曲Sha la la 14. 痴心換情深; 15. 假裝 (Cha Cha Mix 60's Version); 16. 離開憂鬱的習慣; CD3: 1. 紅葉落索的時候; 2. I've Never Been To Me; 3. 知己 – Vivian Chow & Samuel Tai (Duet); 4. 情未了 – Vivian Chow & Christopher Wong (Duet); 5. 萬千寵愛在一身 – Vivian Chow & Hacken Lee (Duet); 6. 要你喜歡我; 7. 留住有情人; 8. 男人心 – Vivian Chow & Shirley Kwan (Duet); 9. 敏感夜; 10. 現在抱緊你 (Japanese) – Vivian Chow & Asaku Yoshida (Duet); 11. 也許應該分手了; 12. 出嫁的清晨; 13. C'est La Vie; 14. 時間; 15. Sometimes When We Touch – Vivian Chow & Samuel Tai (Duet); 16. 想去見你 (Japanese); DVD: 1. 天荒愛未老; 2. 如果你知我苦衷; 3. 流言 – Vivian Chow & Kevin Lin (Duet); 4. 孤單的心痛; 5. 最愛; 6. 感情的分禮; 7. 留戀; 8. 紅葉落索的時候; 9. 為你; 10. 時間
Back for Love (Live VCD/DVD)	May 2006	Universal Music (Hong Kong)	Disc 1: 1. Opening+自作多情; 2. 假裝; 3. 戀曲Sha la la 4. 沒有人傻得我; 5. 台下女主角; 6. 孤單的心痛; 7. Sometime when we touch – Vivian Chow & George Lam (Duet); 8. 歲月的童話; 9. 鋼線之舞; 10. 可知我想他; 11. 情未了 – Vivian Chow & Christopher Wong (Duet); Disc 2: 1. 時間; 2. 最愛; 3. 流言 – Vivian Chow & Kevin Lin (Duet); 4. Medley: 自動自覺/ 詛咒; 5. 知己 – Vivian Chow & Samuel Tai (Duet); 6. C'est la vie 7. 會錯意; 8. 我願意; 9. 遇見; 10. 我真的受了傷 – Vivian Chow & Leo Ku (Duet); Disc 3: 1. 為你; 2. 紅葉落絮的時候; 3. 如果你知我苦衷; 4. 感情的分禮; 5. 紅河村; 6. 留戀; 7. 天荒愛未老; 8. 貓狗篇; 9. 倪匡vs倪震篇 10. 花絮篇
盆栽	Mar 2011	PTM/Star Entertainment	CD: 1. 盆栽; 2. 無雙譜; 3. 有您美麗太多; 4. 放下的力量; DVD: 1. 盆栽; 2. 無雙譜; 3. 有您美麗太多; 4. 放下的力量
HIM (周慧敏專輯) (Cantonese/Mandarin)	Dec 2014	Music Plus/Linfair Records	CD: 1. 肋骨; 2. A Love Like This (English); 3. 天家; 4. 天盡頭; 5. 美麗 (Mandarin); 6. 石頭雨; 7. 伯拉河; 8. 咖啡在等一個人 (Mandarin); 9. 依靠 (Mandarin); 10. 回轉 (Mandarin); DVD: 1. A Love Like This; 2. 咖啡在等一個人

== Painting ==
- 2001: Chow's painting "Old Man from San Geung" won the "New Vision Award" in the "New Vision: Water Based Media Painting" exhibition.
- 2002: Water-color painting "Looking Towards the Future" was selected to be in the first "China Water Color Painting of People Exhibition"
- 2002: Chow's three water-color paintings "Looking for Dreams", "Back Alley" and "The Movement of the Waves" were on display at the "Scenes of Yau Ma Tai, Tsim Sha Tsui and Mongkok – Hong Kong Water Color Painting Exhibition".
- 2003: Painting "Old Home" painted in "Tai O Hut" was on displayed at the exhibition hall of Hong Kong City Hall

== Advertisements ==
=== Commercials ===
- 1989: Lai Chi Kok Amusement Park
- 1989: Isetan Store
- 1990: SAMPO CD
- 1990: TDK Magnetic Necklace
- 1993: 蜜力歐- O Drinks
- 1992–1993: Canon Printer
- 1993–1996: Kao Sifone Shampoo Serie
- 1994: 愛之味 Coconut Milk
- 1995: Ajinomoto
- 1995: "Great News》Idol Watch
- 1996: 藝詩新婚服務
- 1997: Fen Huang Oatmeal
- 2004–2007: P&G Pantene Anti-hair Breakage Shampoo
- 2004–2009: Shiseido Revital Serie
- 2007: Phillip Wain Health & Beauty Center
- 2008–2013: Elyze
- 2010: AIGLE
- 2010–2015: Bestcare (China)
- 2011: Neway
- 2012: SuperLife Taiwan
- 2013–2019: Suisse Programme
- 2016–2018: Quaker Milk Powder

=== Public service ad and activities ===
- 1987–1992: (Participated in some charity activities)
- 1993: "World Vivsion's FAMINE HOUR 30", Taiwan "Disaster Mitigation and Poverty Alleviation" event, Fund Raising Activity for Guangzhou Police Force, RTHK's "Solar Project" event, "Love Fills Tung Wah – Tung Wah Stars), "Give Children a Rick Dream" for fund raising for abandoned children in Taiwan, benefit concert "Warm Current Action" initiated by the Methodist Church, "Satrlight Charity Night Benefit Concert", and performed in the 25 anniversary fund raising concert for Chow's Alma Mater. St. Stephen's Church College.
- 1994: "Anti-Piracy Action" event, "Spreading Love and Joy" charity concert, "Hong Kong Warm Current Promotion Concert" for elderly Program, RTHK's "Solar Project 1994" event, "Ultimate Thousands" charity show, held 3 concerts and donated part of the ticket sales to charity organizations, "Tung Wah Charity Show", and Helping Hands Association's "Concern For the Elderly: Warm Current Action Benefit Concert".
- 1995: "Starlight Charity Night Benefit Concert", "Illumining the Light of Heart " Charity Benefit Concert, "Neighborhood Watch", Oxfam charity events as "Poverty & Wealth Banquet Star", "World Vivsion's FAMINE HOUR 30", "Anti-Piracy Fund" raising charity bazaar event, "All for One Charity Show", "Ambassador of Etiquette" for Singapore, "Against Fraudulence by Dishonest Trader Action" in Consumer Rights and Interests Protection Organization Pledge Convention, "Po Leung Kuk's Gala Spectacular" charity show, RTHK's "Solar Project" event, "Fighting against AIDS Action Concert" and "Tung Wah Charity Show".
- 1996: "Warm Current From Hong Kong for China" as part of "Elderly Famine 8 Hours" event, RTHK's "Solar Project" event, Ultimate Thousands for the Elderly" charity show, Hong Kong Years and Days" concert to raise fund for Guangdong "Initiate Hope" education plan and "Tung Wah Charity Show"
- 1999: Chow was appointed as the ambassador for the Society for Abandoned Animals (SAA), and shot promo posters
- 2000: Chow attended SAA fundraising event
- 2002: Donated clothing for Tung Wah charity sale, visited SAA for promotional event, and Invited by RTHK to create a card for the community project "Angel of Life".
- 2003: invited to be the ambassador for the "Non-Smokers' Movement of HK" and wrote a public letter to the Ex-Chief Executive Mr. Tung Chee Hwa, petitioning for the health hazards of smoking that are imposed on non-smokers.
- 2004: Donated all book royalties for "My Cat Son Pal Chow" to SAA (Society for Abandoned Animals) for their operation funds use, visited SAA again for promotional event, assisted in promoting women's American Pool game and brought about women pool fever in Hong Kong.
- 2005: Named as the 'Hong Kong Smoke Free Workplace Leading Company Ambassador' and participated in activities of propagandizing the health hazards of smoking, attended Po Leung Kuk's pledging ceremony for the " Caring Elderly Services Plan" and visited elderly who lived alone, attended the "Olympian City Denmark Christmas lighting event" as a guest star and promoted gift collection plan for the children accepting aid from Po Leung Kuk.
- 2006: Attended a makeup marathon charity event for Shiseido and raised money for Po Leung Kuk's "Caring and Serving the Elderly: University Experience Plan", donated all of the rewards she got for the 3 concerts of "Vivian Chow – Back for Love 2006" to Non-Profit making Veterinary Service Society (NPV) to raise money for establishing a veterinary clinic, the guest star at Po Leung Kuk's "Caring and Serving the Elderly: University Experience Plan" commencement ceremony, invited to be Pink Ambassador for Hong Kong Cancer Fund (HKCF) to communicate the prevention and cure information of breast cancer and to promote events of international month of breast cancer, invited to be the guest for Festival Walk Christmas lighting event and autographed on a crystal butterfly certificate for auction, the money raised from which was donated to Make-A-Wish funds to help children with foul diseases.
- 2007: Invited to be Pink Ambassador again for Hong Kong Cancer Fund (HKCF) and to shoot a TV promo as well as posters to communicate the prevention and cure information of breast cancer to public, worked with World Vision again and went to Congo in Africa to visit the impoverished children and promoted the 'Child Sponsorship Program' and hosted TV program "Sponsor a Child, Make Christmas Merrier", attended Shiseido marathon make-up fundraising activity to help raise money for Po Leung Kuk's Elderly Services, invited to be the "Innocence Ambassador" to advocate for the sorrow coaching service program of EQ Ambassador Society, invited to be the "Computer Recycling Ambassador" by Environmental Protection Department and attended the Computer Recycling Plan Start-up event, attended NPV One Year Anniversary Celebration event as a donor and the guest star.
- 2008: Invited to make a presentation at the "Farewell to My Beloved Pet" event by Society for Abandoned Animals, attended the "Love My China 2008 New Entertainment Charity Stars Event" in Shanghai and received the "2008 Most Influential Charitable Star" award, invited by the HK government and Mainland affairs office to be ambassador for the campaign promoting HK citizens to register as a voter and shot a TV promo ad and posters, invited by Tobacco Control Office to be the host for tobacco control short promotional video, invited by Oxfam to be the ambassador for the China Development Fund and visited the impoverished villagers in Yunnan, China, participated in the Oxfam Rice Sale fundraising event for the Sichuan earthquake victims as Oxfam ambassador, participated in "Artistes 512 Fundraising Campaign" concert for the Sichuan earthquake victims, invited to be Pink Ambassador again for Hong Kong Cancer Fund (HKCF) for the third time and attended Pink Revolution Press Conference, attended "Pink Revolution" event co-organized by Shiseido Singapore and Cancer Fund as the special guest and Vivian's painting "The Movement of the Waves" was printed on shopping bags for charity sale, invited to be "Love and Care" Ambassador for China AIDS Initiative and went to Fuyang and Kunming, China to visit AIDS patients and to propagandize the prevention and treatment of AIDS, participated in fund-raising event for China Education for Girls Foundation co-organized by Shiseido and United Nations Children's Fund (UNICEF), invited to be the Love Ambassador by Sowers Action and attend the "Love Soup Can Design Contest" award ceremony as the judge and award-presenting guest.
- 2009: Invited by World Vision and Commercial Radio to visit Nepal as Famine Child Sponsorship Ambassador, attend the China AIDS Initiative Check Handover Ceremony as the "Love and Care" Ambassador, attend "30 Hour Famine" Closing concert as Famine Child Sponsorship Ambassador and hosted the TV program "Sponsor and Rescue Hungry Children", private donation to fund the 2nd non-profit making veterinary clinics, personal donation to imbrue the establishment for the 2nd Non-Profit making Veterinary clinic, visited orphanage in Luoyang of Henan, China to learn about the Family Anew Movement organized by the orphanage and HK CEO Foundation, invited to be the judge for "Children and Teenager T-Shirt Design Competition" by HK CEO Foundation and presented the award ceremony, participate in the photo shoot for a photo exhibition "We Unite" which was organized to raise money for AIDS Concern, attend and perform in "Artistes 88 Fund Raising Campaign" at Asia World-Expo to raise money for flood victims in Taiwan, invited to be Pink Ambassador again for Hong Kong Cancer Fund (HKCF) for the fourth time and attended the annual Pink Revolution event, invited to be the ambassador for Make-A-Wish organization and participated in check handover and the award ceremony for the event of "In Full Support of Hong Kong 2009 East Asian Games: Cycling Charity Race, invited by Hong Kong AIDS Foundation to interview AIDS patient and write a chapter for the book "Positive Lives" as the "Love and Care" Ambassador for China AIDS Initiative, named as The Celeb who Made us Care by Cosmopolitan Hong Kong for Cosmopolitan Fun Fearless Awards 2009, attend "Hachiko: Christmas Party for Love" check handover ceremony as Non-Profit making Veterinary Service Society (NPV) donor and announced that NPV founded the Homeless Animals Medical Treatment Fund
- 2010: Attended NPV's charity premier for the movie Hachi: A Dog's Tale as a donor and addressed on promoting TNR (Trap-Neuter-Return) program for homeless animals, invited by China AIDS Initiative and Hong Kong AIDS Foundation, visited Gansu, China as the "Love and Care" Ambassador and hosted the inauguration ceremony for Clinics in Jinjizhen, Qingshui county, visited Dien Bien, Vietnam as a child sponsor for the World Vision Hong Kong and hosted TV Special "Sponsor a Child, Respond to the Silence and Hunger", attended the fund raising dinner held by Hong Kong AIDS Foundation and China AIDS Initiative as the "Love and Care" Ambassador and gave a benefit performance by singing "Moonlight in Town", invited to attend the "Listen to the Children: A 30-Hour Famine Sharing Session" as a child sponsor for the World Vision Hong Kong, received an award for "Philanthropist of the Year" of JeansWest Entertainment Awards and also invited to present the "Actor/Actress of the Year" awards, attend and sing in the Fundraising TV Programme [Artistes 414 Fundraising Campaign] for the victims of the earthquake in Yushu, China.
- 2011: Acting a "Chinese Love Ambassador"to attend the grand opening ceremony of 中國國際會館 and the charity dinner auction for Care in Yunnan and Disaster Areas in Japan. Vivan auctioned her personal collections in the dinner event and raised funds of HK$200,000, acting a "World Vision Child Sponsor" to attend the sharing session of Child Sponsorship in the"30-Hour Famine", acting a "Music Ambassador" to sing in a charity fundraising dinner event held at the Crossroads Global Distribution, invited to participate the dubbing of Japanese film "Wasao" in the Hong Kong version, sound interpretation of actress "Jie ji" and donated all of reward to NPV, invited by "HK Blood Foundation" to shoot a promotional video, hosted the TV special "Sponsor a child, I can do it" as a child sponsor for World Vision Hong Kong, attended the activities "charitable treatment day" held by group of Deo Derm to appeal for Africa Hunger Relief as Elyze spokesperson and a child sponsor for World Vision Hong Kong, invited by RTHK as presenter of "Touch the heart Award"in "Gala Extraordinaire – Stage of Ability"so as to promote United Nations Convention on the Rights of Persons with Disabilities’, Visit Outer Mongolia as a child sponsor for the World Vision Hong Kong, Invited as the guest of honor to host the light-up ceremony at "New Town Plaza Starlight Garden"and also promote to sponsor a child for World Vision Hong Kong, invited by Hong Kong AIDS Foundation as "Love and Care"ambassador to make a speech in Musical theater at Sheung Wan Civic Centre (Theatre), hosted the TV special "Sponsor a child, gave the Life" as a child sponsor for World Vision Hong Kong, invited by the Hong Kong AIDS Foundation as "Love and Care" ambassador to sing at "20th Anniversary Charity Dinner".
- 2012: Invited by HK Cancer Fund to shoot a promotional video and photo, helped The Amity Foundation China recording the theme Choral song "Strong Smile", helped The Amity Foundation China recording the encourage video "同燃童心夏令營", attended "Used Book Recycling Campaign 2012"which can help constructing new school at Shanxi China, invited as "Love and Care"ambassador to attend "Love under the sun – Shenzhen and Hong Kong Summer Camp 2012" which co-organised by the Chinese Association of STD/AIDS Prevention and Control and Hong Kong Committee for China AIDS Initiative, appointed as The 2nd of "Guangzhou voluntary Hall of Fame", "Caring Ambassador of Voluntary Service canton Fair" and "Honor consultant of Guangzhou volunteer art troupe".
- 2013: Attended ACE Foundation Event to promote marine conservation, recorded theme song and music video "Everything is Possible" for Hong Kong charity SEDH Amity Foundation, invited by Medecins Sans Frontieres as principal Guest appearance at MSF Day, invited by NGO Green Monday as International Ambassador and participated in Green Monday's print advertisement as well as attending Green Monday's press conference at Hong Kong International Airport, Travelled with World Vision Hong Kong to Sri Lanka. The entire trip was filmed for TV programme to promote Child Sponsorship, as a special guest appearance at "Vivian Lai All For Love" charity concert.
- 2014: Invited by Early Psychosis Foundation to shoot the 2015 Calendar
- 2015: Published an articles for refugees after visited Syrian refugees in Jordan and Lebanon with World Vision Hong Kong, invited to be a performing guest for Love Foundation to support the Chinese Children, Invited to be a performing guest for "快樂玉米關愛兒童全國巡迴演唱會" in Dong Guan.
- 2016: Invited as a performing guest for Sasa with Suisse Programme Po Leung Kuk Annual Charity Ball, invited as officiating guest for "Run for Syrian Children" of the World Vision to raise awareness for Syrian children, attended "Sing To Celebrate 25th Anniversary Charity Dinner" hold by Hong Kong AIDS foundation.
- 2017: Visited Kolkata India with World Vision Hong Kong, invited by World Vision Hong Kong to shoot the campaign "We Are Sponsors" for promoting child sponsorship, invited as a performing guest for "莎莎邁向40美麗承存慈善演唱會".

== Publication ==
=== Photo albums ===
- 1992: "Vivian Chow DREAMS"
- 1993: Pocket photo album (Included in the Album "浪漫" which released in Taiwan)
- 1993: "美不勝收"
- 1993: "Secrets"
- 1993: Pocket photo album II (Included in the Album "最愛" which released in Taiwan)
- 1993: "Vivian Chow Beautiful Cares"
- 1994: "周慧敏94寫真集"
- 1994: "周慧敏寫真集 – 成長"
- 1995: "周慧敏 – 純美的化身"

=== Prose ===
Year	Title	Publication	ISBN
2004	"我的貓兒子周慧豹"	Crown	ISBN 9624517940

== Awards and nominations ==
- 1986: RTHK's (Radio Television Hong Kong) DJ competition – 1st Runner up
- 1988: Hong Kong Film Awards – nominated for "Best New Performer"
- 1989: RTHK Top 10 Gold Songs Awards – "Best New Prospect Exceptional Award"
- 1992: Metro Hit Radio Hong Kong – "Attractive lips award"
- 1992: Commercial Radio Hong Kong – "Ten Artists with Healthy Image"
- 1992: Metro Hits Radio Hong Kong – "Top Ten Hit Artists"
- 1992: Hong Kong "Best Wife Award" (Winner)
- 1993: Min Sheng Daily Taiwan – 1992 Top Ten Hong Kong Actor/Actress (Winner)
- 1993: Chinatimes Taiwan – 1992 Top Ten Singers and Album (Winner)
- 1993: Next Magazine TV Awards – "Most Popular Artists" (Winner)"
- 1993: TVB – Jade Solid Gold The Most Popular Duet Song (Silver)
- 1993: Metro Hit Radio Hong Kong – Top Hit Female Singers (Bronze)
- 1993: Hong Kong "Best Wife Award" (2nd runner up)
- 1993: Taiwanese Media – "Hong Kong Star Lover in the Army"
- 1993: NHK Japan – "Most Popular Foreign Female Singer"
- 1993: Taiwanese Media – "Most Popular Hong Kong Female Artist"
- 1994: Hong Kong "Golden Rainbow Star"
- 1994: TVB Jade Solid Gold Best 10 Awards – Best Performance in New Generation (Silver)
- 1994: Hong Kong "The Most Ideal Mother"
- 1994: Sunday Weekly Magazine – Best photograph sales among all the female artists
- 1994: RTHK – "Ten Stars with Loving Hearts" appraisals
- 1994: Commercial Radio Hong Kong – "Ten Fittest Stars"
- 1994: Japanese Media – "Most Popular Hong Kong Female Singer"
- 1995: Sunday Weekly Magazine – Best photograph sales among all the female artists
- 1995: Voted by middle school students – "the No. 1 Dream Girl"
- 1995: Chosen as the new successor
- 1995: Most popular cover characters by appearing on 15 magazines in a year
- 1995: Named as one of "Asian Pop Divas" by Japanese critics along with Faye Wong and Sandy Lam
- 1995: Taiwanese Media – "Top 10 Dream Girls of Military Men"
- 1995: Chinese Media – "Top 10 Most Popular Performers"
- 1995: Great News Taiwan – "Top Ten Star Lovers"
- 1995: Japanese Media – "Kansai Pop Diva"
- 1996: Apple Daily Hong Kong – The most favorite female artist under 18 and the second most favorite female artist above 18
- 1996: Famous Japanese new magazine "SAPIO" – "No. 1 Popular Female Pop Singer of Hong Kong"
- 1996: The first Chinese female singer appeared on the cover of Japanese popular comic magazine "SUPER JUMP"
- 1996: "Top Ten Celebrities on Internet" – First ranking among Chinese artists
- 2001: Taiwanese Media – "Most Wanted for a Comeback"
- 2001: Chow's painting "Old Man from San Geung" won the "New Vision Award" in the "New Vision: Water Based Media Paintings" exhibition
- 2002: Chow's water-color painting "Looking at the Past, Looking Towards the Future" was selected to be the best five of Hong Kong in the first "China Water Color Painting of People Exhibition."
- 2004: Chow released her first book "My Cat Son Pal Chow," which quickly sold more than 20,000 books and was also in the top 10 best-selling books for months
- 2004: Played in the "First Official Pool Billiards Team League in Hong Kong"
- 2005: Leo Ku invited Chow to sing a duet "Love too late" with him, the song became the most popular song in Karaoke for months
- 2006: Voted by the readers of Cosmopolitan Magazine Hong Kong – My Favorite Spokesperson
- 2006: Voted by the readers of magazine "Fashion & Beauty" – My Favorite Spokesperson
- 2006: Metro Hit Radio Hong Kong – "The Best Hit Karaoke Song of 2006" ("Love too late" – Duet Version)
- 2007: Chinese fashion magazine "Good Housekeeping" – "Most Feminine Chinese Lady"
- 2007: Voted by the readers of Cosmopolitan Magazine Hong Kong – My Favorite Spokesperson in "Best of The Best Beauty Awards"
- 2008: Voted by the readers of More Magazine – My Favorite Brand Ambassador of Cosmetics Brands of Forever Love Beauty Awards
- 2008: Shanghai Media – "Most Influential Artist for Charity in 2008"
- 2009: Shiseido China confers on people who've made outstanding contribution in the domains of cosmetic & makeup, societal culture and environment the title of "Shiseido Star of City" on July 31, 2009. Vivian is given the title of "Expo Star of City" in the domain of cosmetic & makeup
- 2009: Voted by the readers of Weekend Weekly – My Favorite Brand Ambassador (Elyze) of Cosmetic Service Awards
- 2009: Bazaar China – "The Most Beautiful 40 years-old with Bazaar Style" in December issue
- 2009: Cosmopolitan Hong Kong – The Celeb Who Made Us Care representative person of Fun Fearless Awards 2009 in charity field
- 2010: Voted by the male readers of Esquire China – The no.1 of "The Legend of Beauty – The most beautiful Hong Kong Actress in two decades"
- 2010: Beijing Media – "Philanthropist in 2010" award
- 2010: Bazaar China – "The Best Face award" in September issue
- 2010: Voted by Hong Kong lesbian – "Top Dream Lover"
- 2010: Voted by internet users – "The Best Wife in Town" (fourth place)
- 2010: Cosmopolitan China – "Asian Charming Looks Awards" of Beauty Awards 2010
- 2011: One of winner of "The 23rd of top 10 Best Dressed Personalities Award – Fashion Visionaries"
- 2012: Mr. Magazine Hong Kong – "The Ten Most Attractive Woman"
- 2012: Voted by Korean internet user – "the youngest face beautiful woman"
- 2015: The character Chow played in the 90's famous drama "The Greed of Man" touched a lot of television viewers while the drama re-released again on TVB
- 2015: TVB Drama Awards – The Most Popular Classic Drama – "The Greed of Man"
- 2015: Voted by Hong Kong internet users – "The No. 1 Goddess"
