= Neway Group Holdings Limited =

- Type: Public
- Founded: 1979
- Headquarters: Hong Kong
- Key people: SUEK Ka Lun, Ernie Chairman

Neway Group Holdings Limited (Chinese: 中星集團控股有限公司) SEHK: 55 is a Hong Kong-listed entertainment and printing company. Formerly known as Chung Tai Printing Holdings Ltd. (Chinese: 中大印刷集團控股有限公司), it was founded by Mr. Christopher Suek in 1979 as a small printing firm engaging in label stock printing. In 1983, Chung Tai Printing expanded into production of labels and overlays using material supplied by 3M Hong Kong Ltd. The labels and overlays business was later operated under the name of King's Industrial Co. and became one of the few authorized converters in Hong Kong for the manufacture of 3M labels, adhesive labels and overlays. As business grown, The Greatime Offset Printing Co., Ltd was established in 1987 to conduct the offset printing business and to serve the growing market of brochures, manuals, booklets and other paper products. To lower cost, Chung Tai Printing (China) Co., Ltd was established in Shenzhen to take advantage of the competitive production costs.

Chung Tai Printing went into public listing on the Hong Kong Stock Exchange in 1992.

To further expand and diversify its business, it acquired Neway Entertainment Group in 2009 and changed the Group's name to Neway Group Holdings Limited.

== Key Operations ==
Neway Group operations can be divided into Printing, Music and Entertainment. Printing consists of the Chung Tai printing business which was the foundation of Neway Group when it was set up. The entertainment stream covers the karaoke and music businesses bought through Neway Entertainment group back in 2009.

=== Printing Operations ===
Printing line of business is operated under the name of Chung Tai Printing in both Hong Kong and China. The core production plant is located in Shenzhen, one of China's economic zones, and employs about 1,500 workers. It covers about 1 million square feet and is equipped with various facilities. Key subsidiaries include the following :

- Chung Tai Printing (China) Company Limited
- Chung Tai Printing Company Limited
- The Greatime Offset Printing Company Limited
- Chung Tai Advertising Company
- Chung Tai Credit Card Mfg., Co.
- Delight Source Limited
- Kam Hon Printing (Shenzhen) Co., Ltd.

=== Music and Entertainment ===
The music and entertainment line of business manages the careers of singers and pop groups, produces and issues recorded music, and produces motion pictures. The operations are delivered through the following subsidiaries:

- Neway Star Limited
- Star Entertainment (Universe) Limited
- Neway Star Pictures Limited

== Latest Development ==
Neway Group Holdings Ltd was selling its entire stake and debt of Zen Vantage Ltd to Ritzy Success Enterprises Limited for HK$153 Million.
