= Samuel Tai =

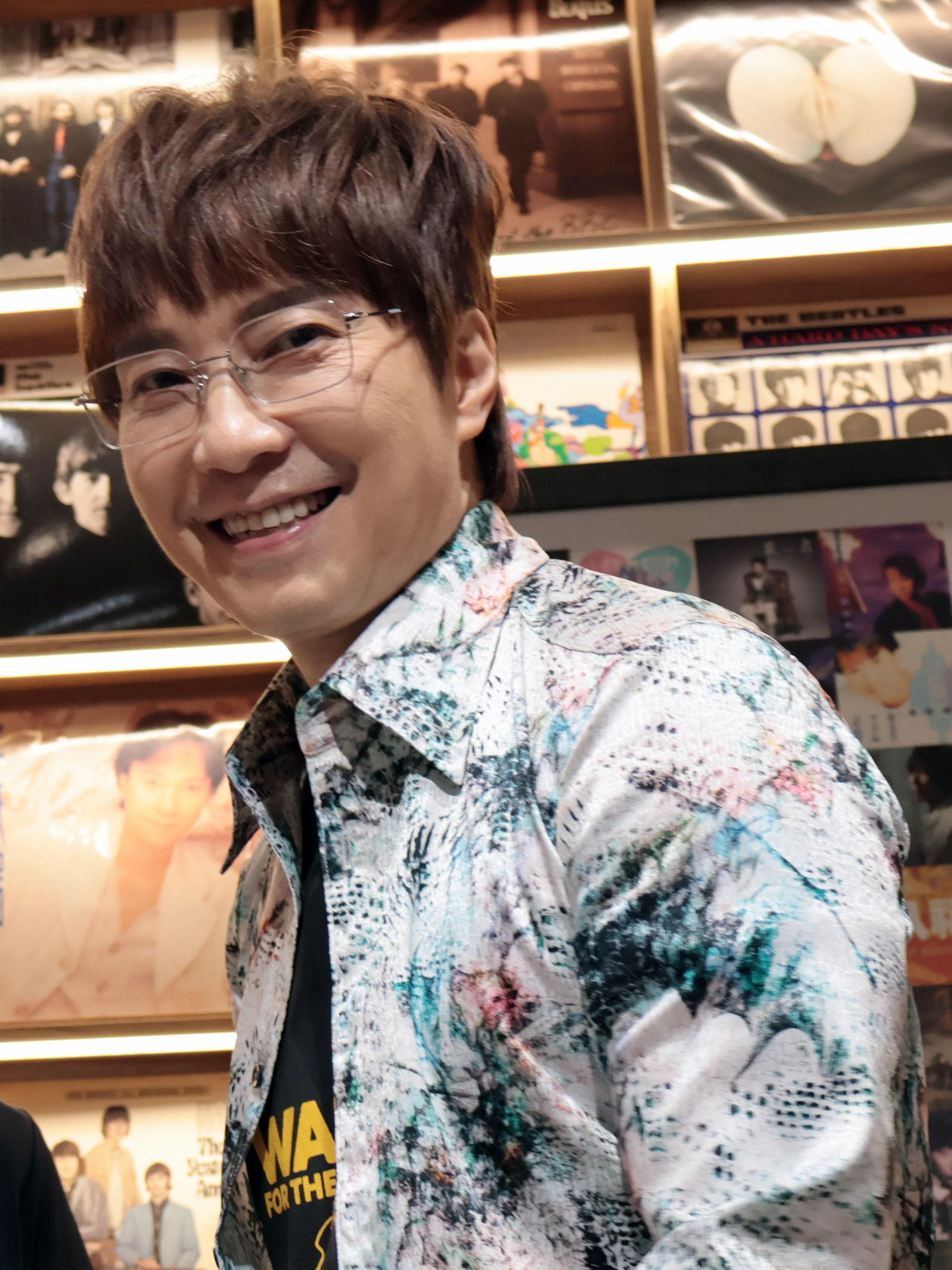
- Samuel in 2024
- Born: 邰正霄; 6 November 1966 (age 59); Hong Kong
- Occupations: Singer-songwriter, record producer
- Years active: 1988–present
- Children: 1
- Parent: Tai Li-ren (邰立任)

Chinese name
Transcriptions
Standard Mandarin
- Hanyu Pinyin: Tái Zhèngxiāo
Yue: Cantonese
- Jyutping: Toi4 Zing3 Siu1
- Musical career
- Genres: Mandopop, Cantopop
- Instruments: Vocals, piano, guitar
- Labels: Decca Records Taiwan, Rock Records

Samuel Tai (Chinese: 邰正宵; pinyin: Tái Zhèngxiāo, born 6 November 1966) is a Hong Kong-born Taiwanese singer-songwriter. Tai debuted in 1988 and then released his first solo album Good Boys (理想男孩) in 1990. In 1993, he wrote the song "999 Roses" (九佰九拾九朶玫瑰), which turned out to be a huge success and big hit. His most popular songs include "999 Roses", "Thousand Origami Cranes" (千紙鶴), "1001 Nights" (一千零一夜) and "Let You Hear My Heart Beating" (心要讓你聽見) etc. He subsequently released 30 albums. His latest album, In the Beginning was released on 31 August 2012.

== Early life ==
Tai was born in Hong Kong and spent his childhood on Shanghai Street in Mongkok. He was educated at Min Guang College and Wellington English Secondary School. He admired Bruce Lee and has studied Wing Chun from Lok Yiu for many years. He qualified in Taekwondo with a first-degree black belt. Due to an injury he had to stay at home to rest. During recovery, his father bought a guitar to let him pass time; this started his attachment to music.

Tai's father, Tai Li-ren, is a Chinese medicine practitioner. Influenced by his father, Samuel Tai also intended to become a doctor. However, he couldn't continue his study at the Faculty of Medicine of HKU due to poor grades, so he went to the Kaohsiung Medical College in Taiwan for his medical study in 1985. He sang in the café and pub weekly as a part-time job to support his study.

After graduation, Tai got a medical technician license in Hong Kong. But his heart always longed for music. In 1988, Tai participated in a Pop music contest in Taiwan and won the 5th prize. After that, he signed a contract with UFO Records for 2 years, which was not very successful. In 1993, he wrote the song 999 Roses (九百九拾九朶玫瑰), which turned out to be a huge success and big hit. His most popular songs include: 999 Roses(九百九拾九朶玫瑰), Thousand origami cranes (千紙鶴), 1001 Nights (一千零一夜) and Let you listen to my heart (心要讓你聽見), and others.

Tai retreated out of the limelight for a few years to become active in church work. In recent years he has started to be very active on stage in mainland China. His new album, In the Beginning was released on 31 August 2012.

== Career ==
While at Kaohsiung Medical College in Kaohsiung, Taiwan studying medical technology, Tai also sang folk songs in restaurants. In 1988 he participated in the first session of Popular Music Competition and was one of the Winners (together with other winners, famous singer Chang Yu-sheng, Dave Wang, Jack Yao). That event started his music career; publishing albums like Nomad, Ideal Boys, Devoted to You, Cheer for Me, and others.

In the early 1990s, Chinese songwriter-singers from Taiwan rose in popularity. In 1993, Tai published the album To find a word to replace. The main hit song "999 Roses" became a big success, and was recognized as typical Chinese love song, even when the story was based on the story of him sending a rose to a female cancer patient he cared for that passed away. He later released "Feel so lonely when thinking of you", "Thousand origami cranes", "Let you listen to my heart" and "1001 Nights".

Tai's popularity gained him recognition of his creative talent. He started to perform covers of other singers' songs, such as the "Blue Street Lights" and "Love Movies Play" by Leon Lai, "Devoted to you as usual" by Leo Ku and "Goodbye Means Tears" by Alan Tam. Tai also sang two songs sung by Leon Lai in Cantonese and included them in the album Rekindle Love. He thanked Leon Lai for making his songs so popular.

“Feel so lonely when think of you" became a great hit on various radio station in Hong Kong in 1994, its popularity in Hong Kong exceeding Taiwan. Through this, Hong Kong fans started to realise Tai was native to Hong Kong. Many of Tai's Mandarin songs were successfully introduced into the market of Hong Kong. He formally signed a contract with Cinepoly, and he returned to the Hong Kong stage. Tai's song "How can I make you like me"," Has to steal love" and " Soul too deep" were very popular. His debut Cantonese album "Soul too deep" was on the top sales charts after release.

In 1996, Tai launched his second Cantonese album. His company Cinepoly invited his idol Sam Hui (許冠傑) to write the hit song "Moonlight Ocean Dream". The album of the same name had impressive sales.

1997 was the year of Hong Kong's reunification with mainland China. Tai's creation, "Pearl of the Orient – New Millenium", was selected as the theme song of the reunification event. Tai was welcomed and popular in Hong Kong, but the limited size of the Cantonese song market led to the decision to move his career center back to Taiwan.

In 2008, he released a charity song called "Smile Again", which was dedicated to the survivors of the 12 May Sichuan earthquake. With the song, Tai hoped to raise money for Sichuan reconstruction and help the survivors of the devastating tragedy to find the strength to rebuild their lives.

In 2011, after 15 years, Tai re-introduced his third Cantonese album Love Songs, to allow him to rise in popularity among younger fans in Hong Kong and Guangdong.

In March 2012, Tai attended an event in Guangzhou, and revealed that his new Mandarin album In the Beginning would be released in September.

With knowledge that being on stage, a musical career had its limits, Tai started to work behind-the-scenes few years after he became famous. He started to explore new and talented singers. He successfully made Wallace Chung a super-star. After his marriage, Tai focused on song production and behind-the-scenes work, while he began to be more active in mainland China. He is not only active himself on stage, but also established the "heart-strings" music studio. His continued search for new younger talent let to singers like Gelijiefu (Inner Mongolia ) become contracted.

== Personal life ==
Tai has always kept a clean-cut image. He has kept a low profile personal life even after having become a popular singer. Tai and his girlfriend got married in the United States after a decade-long relationship, the wedding being held at a Seattle church in 1988. In 1999, they welcomed the birth of their son Tai Zhen, also known as Henry.

Tai is a devout Christian. He's written popular gospel songs including: "Source of love","Love is endless","I am special","Emptiness","This world is in countdown". Besides publishing gospel albums, he is also involved in the gospel movie "Source of Love", playing a troubled young man who had a stutter.

== Discography ==
- Ideal Boy (理想男孩 1990年3月 UFO Records (Taiwan) Co Ltd. (飞碟唱片) 国语）
- Devoted to You (痴心的我 1990年8月 UFO Records (Taiwan) Co Ltd. (飞碟唱片) 国语）
- Cheer for Me (为我喝采 1992年8月 UFO Records (Taiwan) Co Ltd. (飞碟唱片) 国语）
- Find a Word to Replace (找一个字代替 1993年9月 Linfair Records Ltd (福茂唱片) 国语）
- Thousand Origami Cranes (千紙鶴（1994年6月 Linfair Records Ltd (福茂唱片) 国语）
- Want You to Have Good Solitude(想你想得好孤寂（《千纸鹤》香港版）（1994年7月 Linfair Records Ltd (福茂唱片) 国语）
- Lonely Every Night (夜夜寂寞 1994年9月 Cinepoly Record.Co.Ltd (新艺宝唱片) 国语/粤语 EP）
- Onward and Upward (步步高陞 1995年4月 Cinepoly Record.Co.Ltd (新艺宝唱片) 国语 EP）
- Soul Too Deep(用情太深 1995年5月 Cinepoly Record.Co.Ltd (新艺宝唱片) 粤语）
- 1001 Nights (一千零一夜1995年9月 Linfair Records Ltd (福茂唱片) 国语）
- Let You Listen to My Heart (Love in Action) (心要让你听见（1995年12月 Linfair Records Ltd (福茂唱片) 国语/粤语 EP）
- Love Reset to Zero (爱归零（台湾版）1996年5月 Linfair Records Ltd (福茂唱片) 国语）
- Love Reset to Zero (爱归零（香港版）1996年5月 Linfair Records Ltd (福茂唱片) 国语）
- You Are So Vain（You_Are_So_Vain1996年9月 Linfair Records Ltd (福茂唱片) 英语）
- Moonlight Ocean Dream (月光 海洋 夢 1996年11月 Cinepoly Record.Co.Ltd (新艺宝唱片) 粤语）
- Prisoner (俘虜 1997年4月 Linfair Records Ltd (福茂唱片) 国语）
- Pearl of the Orient-new Millennium (东方之珠新纪元（1997年7月 Cinepoly Record.Co.Ltd (新艺宝唱片) 国语/粤语 新曲+精选）
- Acacia and Confused (相思如麻 1998年5月 Linfair Records Ltd (福茂唱片) 国语）
- Wait a Hundred Years Again(再等一百年 2000年12月7日 Skyhigh Entertainment Co., Ltd (擎天娱乐) 国语）
- The Lucky One (幸运儿 2003年7月 步升音乐 国语）
- On Both Sides (两边（内地版）（2003年9月24日 Rock Records Co., Ltd. (滚石唱片) 国语）
- This World is in Countdown (这世界已正在倒数 2004年8月31日 Siloam Music 国语 福音EP）
- Everlasting Love (千古不变的爱 2004年12月 Siloam Music 国语 福音专辑）
- The Shell in Blue Color (蓝色贝壳 2006年6月2日 Dorian International Entertainment Co.Ltd (多利安唱片) 国语/粤语）
- I Do Not Deserve (我不配 2007年12月14日 Universal Music Group (环球唱片) 国语）
- Source of Love (源來是愛 源来是爱2008年12月4日 Linfair Records Ltd (福茂唱片) 国语 新曲+精选）
- Beyond the Highest Heaven (九霄云外（2009年10月12日 Universal Music Ltd (环球音乐) 国语）
- Eight Extraordinary Meridians (奇經八脈（2010年12月3日 Universal Music Ltd (环球音乐) 国语）
- Love Songs (情歌一首首（2011年9月30日 Asia Muse Entertainment Group.Ltd (亚神音乐) 粤语）
- In the Beginning (起初（2012年8月31日 Asia Muse Entertainment Group.Ltd (亚神音乐) 国语）
- Diva (歌者1（2013年4月18日 国语）
- Diva2 (歌者2（2013年12月20日 国语）
- Diva3 (歌者3（2015年10月30日 国语/粤语）
- Love in the moment (愛在當下（2016年12月28日 国语/粤语）

=== Featured/compilations ===
- Nomad (烈火青春 1988年8月 UFO Records (Taiwan) Co Ltd. (飞碟唱片) 国语 合辑）
- Seven Wolves (七匹狼1989年3月 UFO Records (Taiwan) Co Ltd. (飞碟唱片) 国语 电影原声带/合辑）
- Rekindle Love (重燃爱恋 1994年12月 Linfair Records Ltd (福茂唱片)/Cinepoly Record.Co.Ltd (新艺宝唱片) 国语/粤语 精选集）
- Lost and Found (失物招領 2002年10月30日 Linfair Records Ltd (福茂唱片) 国语 精选系列）
- On Both Sides of the New Songs + Featured (两边（台湾版）（2004年1月6日 Rock Records Co., Ltd. (滚石唱片) 国语 新曲+精选）
- Mandarin Classic Songs (國語真經典（2005年1月27日 Universal Music Group (环球唱片) 国语 精选系列）

== Filmography ==
- 1989 – Seven Wolves (played little Tai)
- 1989 – Seven Wolves (played little Tai, the memories of the long-haired and camels)
- 2003 – Source to Love (played Ka Kit)
- 2005 – Ping Pong (cameo, played a physician)
- 2014 – The Break-Up Artist

== Awards and nominations ==
Year	Award	Category	Nominated work	Result
1990	1st Golden Melody Awards	Best New Artist	—N/a	Nominated
