= List of TVB series (2002) =

This is a list of series released by or aired on TVB Jade Channel in 2002.

== Top ten drama series in ratings ==
The following is a list of the highest-rated drama series released by TVB in 2002. The list includes premiere week and final week ratings.

Highest-rated drama series of 2002
| Rank | English title | Chinese title | Average | Peak | Premiere | Final |
|---|---|---|---|---|---|---|
| 1 | Family Man | 絕世好爸 | 33 | 38 | 30 | 35 |
| 2 | Legal Entanglement | 法網伊人 | 33 | 42 | 29 | 35 |
| 3 | The Trust of a Lifetime | 情事緝私檔案 | 32 | 36 | 29 | 32 |
| 4 | Take My Word for It | 談判專家 | 31 | 41 | 29 | 41 |
| 5 | A Case of Misadventure | 騎呢大狀 | 30 | 35 | 29 | 32 |
| 6 | Burning Flame II | 烈火雄心II | 30 | 38 | 28 | 32 |
| 7 | Golden Faith | 流金歲月 | 29 | 43 | 24 | 37 |
| 8 | Where the Legend Begins | 洛神 | 29 | 39 | 28 | 33 |
| 9 | A Herbalist Affair | 情牵百子柜 | 29 | 33 | 29 | 29 |
| 10 | Law Enforcers | 勇探實錄 | 27 | 32 | 24 | 28 |

== First line series ==
These dramas aired in Hong Kong from 7:30 to 8:30 pm (8:00 to 9:00 pm from 10 July onwards), Monday to Friday on TVB.

| Airing date | English title (Chinese title) | Number of episodes | Main cast | Theme song (T) Sub-theme song (ST) | Genre | Notes | Official website |
|---|---|---|---|---|---|---|---|
| 28 Jan- 8 Mar | Love Is Beautiful 無頭東宮 | 30 | Anne Heung, Mariane Chan, Eddie Cheung, Marco Ngai | T: "真面目" (Stephanie Che) | Costume drama | Released overseas on April 9, 2001. Copyright notice: 2001. | Official website |
| 11 Mar- 5 Apr | A Herbalist Affair 情牽百子櫃 | 20 | Roger Kwok, Charmaine Sheh, Melissa Ng | T: "苦口良藥" (Andy Hui & Flora Chan) | Modern drama | Released overseas on December 3, 2001. Copyright notice: 2001. | Official website |
| 8 Apr- 25 May | The Bronze Teeth 鐵齒銅牙紀曉嵐 | 35 | Zhang Guoli, Wang Gang, Zhang Tielin, Yuan Li | | Costume drama | China series Prequel to 2003's The Bronze Teeth II. | |
| 27 May- 5 Jul | Taiji Prodigy 少年張三豐 | 28 | Dicky Cheung, Ruby Lin, Li Bing Bing | T: "虛虛實實" (Dicky Cheung); ST: "孤獨不苦" (Dicky Cheung) | Costume drama | China series | |
| 8 Jul- 2 Aug | Let's Face It 無考不成冤家 | 20 | Liza Wang, Joe Ma, Chin Ka Lok, Maggie Cheung | T: "無考不成話" (Hacken Lee) | Modern drama | | Official website |
| 5 Aug- 13 Sep | Eternal Happiness 再生緣 | 32 | Joe Ma, Raymond Lam, Michelle Ye, Tavia Yeung, Myolie Wu | T: "再生花" (Kelly Chen); ST: "記得忘記" (Raymond Lam) | Costume drama | Released overseas on January 28, 2002. Copyright notice: 2001 (Eps. 1-28), 2002 (Eps. 29–32). | Official website |
| 16 Sep- 11 Oct | Slim Chances 我要Fit一Fit | 25 | Lydia Shum, Fennie Yuen, Ronald Cheng, Annie Man, Kevin Cheng | T: "展翅計劃" (Miriam Yeung); ST: "分手變氣球" (Joe Cheng); ST: "沒有預約" (Joe Cheng) | Modern drama | Released overseas on June 24, 2002. | Official website |
| 14 Oct- 9 Nov | Family Man 絕世好爸 | 20 | Flora Chan, Moses Chan, Sonija Kwok, Jay Lau, Michael Tong, Paul Chun, Myolie Wu | T: "暖流" (Flora Chan & William So); ST: "有緣人" (Flora Chan); ST: "泥公仔" (Flora Chan) | Modern drama | | Official website |
| 11 Nov- 27 Dec | The Monkey King: Quest for the Sutra 齊天大聖孫悟空 | 35 | Dicky Cheung, Edmond Leung, Eric Kot, Gillian Chung, Charlene Choi, Kristy Yang, Sammi Cheng, Nicholas Tse, Eric Tsang | T: "高高在下" (Dicky Cheung & Andy Lau); ST: "至情至聖" (Dicky Cheung) | Costume drama | China series | |
| 30 Dec 2002- 24 Jan 2003 | Lofty Waters Verdant Bow 雲海玉弓緣 | 20 | Raymond Lam, Michelle Ye, Rain Li | T: "真愛難共" (Raymond Lam) | Costume drama | | Official website |

== Second line series ==
These dramas aired in Hong Kong from 9:30 to 10:30 pm, Monday to Friday on TVB.

| Airing date | English title (Chinese title) | Number of episodes | Main cast | Theme song (T) Sub-theme song (ST) | Genre | Notes | Official website |
|---|---|---|---|---|---|---|---|
| 21 Jan- 17 Feb | Invisible Journey 彩色世界 | 21 | Jessica Hsuan, Bowie Lam, Joyce Tang, Michael Tong, Halina Tam | T: "闔上眼睛看世界" (Alan Tam); ST: "不要怕黑" (Bowie Lam) | Modern drama | Released overseas on December 24, 2001. Copyright notice: 2001. | Official website |
| 18 Feb- 17 Mar | Legal Entanglement 法網伊人 | 22 | Hacken Lee, Kenix Kwok, Michael Tse, Myolie Wu, Bill Chan, Stephen Au, Elaine Ng | T: "不知不覺愛上你" (Hacken Lee) | Modern drama | Released overseas on August 20, 2001. Copyright notice: 2001. | Official website |
| 18 Mar- 12 Apr | A Case of Misadventure 騎呢大狀 | 20 | Flora Chan, William So, Derek Kok, Stephen Au | T: "智慧齒" (William So) | Period drama | | Official website |
| 15 Apr- 10 May | A Trust of a Life Time 情事緝私檔案 | 20 | Roger Kwok, Amy Kwok, Karen Tong | T: "談談情、探探聽" (Miriam Yeung) | Modern drama | Released overseas on March 19, 2002. Copyright notice: 2001. | Official website |
| 13 May- 21 Jun | The Young Detective II 少年包青天II | 30 | Fan Bing Bing | T: "智慧齒" (William So) | Costume drama | China series | |
| 24 Jun- 27 Jul | Where the Legend Begins 洛神 | 27 | Ada Choi, Steven Ma, Moses Chan, Sonija Kwok | T: "水中仙" (Steven Ma); ST: "流沙" (Steven Ma & Rain Li); ST: "惜花" (Priscilla Ku) | Costume drama | Released overseas on January 21, 2002. Copyright notice: 2001 (Eps. 1-26), 2002 (Ep. 27). | Official website |
| 29 Jul- 13 Sep | Burning Flame II 烈火雄心II | 35 | Alex Fong, Wong He, Maggie Cheung, Flora Chan, Yoyo Mung, Kevin Cheng, Stephen Au, Annie Man | T: "燈蛾" (Aaron Kwok); ST: "長痛長愛" (Gigi Leung) | Modern action | Indirect sequel to 1998's Burning Flame. Indirect prequel to 2009's Burning Flame III. Released overseas on February 18, 2002. Copyright notice: 2001 (Eps. 1-26 & 28–35), 2002 (Ep. 27). | Official website |
| 30 Dec 2002- 24 Jan 2003 | Square Pegs 戇夫成龍 | 20 | Roger Kwok, Jessica Hsuan, Winnie Yeung, Raymond Cho, Leila Tong, Benz Hui | T: "愛情勇敢" (Hacken Lee & Emme Wong) | Costume drama | Indirect prequel to 2005's Life Made Simple. | Official website |

== Third line series ==
These dramas aired in Hong Kong from 10:05 to 11:05 pm (9:30 to 10:30 pm from 5 May onwards), Monday to Friday on TVB.

| Airing date | English title (Chinese title) | Number of episodes | Main cast | Theme song (T) Sub-theme song (ST) | Genre | Notes | Official website |
|---|---|---|---|---|---|---|---|
| 17 Sep 2001- 28 Dec 2002 | Virtues of Harmony 皆大歡喜 | 322 | Nancy Sit, Frankie Lam, Bernice Liu, Michael Tse, Cutie Mui, Kingdom Yuen, Bondy Chiu, Joyce Chen, Louis Yuen, Stephanie Che, Lau Dan, Hawick Lau | T: "皆大歡喜" (Nancy Sit); ST: "心事有誰知" (Nancy Sit) | Costume sitcom | Indirect prequel to 2003's Virtues of Harmony II. | Official website |
| 16 Sep- 15 Nov | Golden Faith 流金歲月 | 45 | Gallen Lo, Deric Wan, Jessica Hsuan, Raymond Lam, Michelle Ye, Tavia Yeung, Myolie Wu, Bill Chan, Anne Heung, Paul Chun | T: "歲月的童話" (Gallen Lo); ST: "陽光燦爛的日子" (Gallen Lo); ST: "當愛情走到盡頭" (Gallen Lo) | Modern drama | Grand production | Official website |
| 18 Nov- 30 Dec | Take My Word For It 談判專家 | 30 | Bobby Au Yeung, Kenix Kwok, Julian Cheung, Annie Man, Moses Chan | T: "有關過關" (Julian Cheung); ST: "又一天" (Julian Cheung) | Modern drama | | Official website |

== Warehoused series ==
These dramas were released overseas and have not broadcast on TVB Jade Channel.

| Oversea released date | English title (Chinese title) | Number of episodes | Main cast | Theme song (T) Sub-theme song (ST) | Genre | Notes | Official website |
|---|---|---|---|---|---|---|---|
| 18 Mar- 12 Apr | The White Flame 紅衣手記 | 20 | Charmaine Sheh, Sammul Chan | T: "甘願為您" (Miriam Yeung) | Modern drama | Copyright notice: 2001. | |
| 1 Apr- 3 May | Treasure Raiders 蕭十一郎 | 20 | Felix Wong, Maggie Siu, Hugo Ng, Anne Heung | T: "找一個地方" (Dave Wong) | Costume drama | | |
| 8 Apr- 10 May | Police Station No. 7 七號差館 | 25 | Nancy Sit, Lawrence Ng, Maggie Cheung, Eddie Cheung | T: "愛錯了嗎" (Lawrence Ng); ST: "悔當初" (Nancy Sit); ST: "拎冧六" (Nancy Sit) | Period drama | Copyright notice: 2001. | Official website |
| 15 Apr- 24 May | Doomed to Oblivion 鄭板橋 | 30 | Wong He, Gigi Lai, Nadia Chan, Myolie Wu | T: "難得糊塗" (Wong He) | Costume drama | | |
| 27 May- 21 Jun | Fight for Love 談談情‧練練武 | 20 | Bowie Lam, Sonija Kwok, Ha Yu | T: "逃出生天" (Bowie Lam) | Modern drama | Aired on TVB Pay Vision Channel in February 2004 | Official website |
| 9 Sep- 4 Oct | Good Against Evil 點指賊賊賊捉賊 | 20 | Deric Wan, Yoyo Mung, Chin Ka Lok, Melissa Ng | T: "非常嫌疑犯" (Eason Chan) | Modern drama | | |
| 7 Oct- 1 Nov | The Battle Against Evil 轉世驚情 | 20 | Auguste Kwan, Micheal Tong, Jade Leung, Mimi Lo, Louisa So, Moses Chan | T: "重生個體" (Auguste Kwan) | Costume action | | |
| 11 Nov- 6 Dec | Love and Again 駁命老公追老婆 | 20 | Alex Fong, Moses Chan, Sonija Kwok, Michael Tse | T: "Try Again" (Sammi Cheng) | Modern drama | Aired on TVB Jade in March 2011 | Official website |
