= King-kong Lam =

Hong Kong actor (born 1970)

- Born: October 13, 1970 (age 54); Hong Kong
- Occupation: Actor

Chinese name
Transcriptions
Standard Mandarin
- Hanyu Pinyin: Lín Jìnggāng
Yue: Cantonese
- Jyutping: Lam4 Ging4-gong6

King-kong Lam is a TVB actor born in Hong Kong, 13 October 1970. He previously played comedic characters, and now recently villains.

== Accident ==
In August 2000, he was caught drunk driving. The incident caused a fire and small explosion. Luckily, there were no casualties.

== Television series ==
- When Lanes Merge
- A Fistful of Stances
- A Watchdog's Tale
- Beyond the Realm of Conscience
- When Easterly Showers Fall on the Sunny West
- The Four
- Speech of Silence
- The Money-Maker Recipe
- Forensic Heroes II
- A Journey Called Life
- The Gentle Crackdown II
- The Ultimate Crime Fighter
- Men Don't Cry
- On the First Beat
- War and Destiny
- Life Art
- Treasure Raiders
- Face to Fate
- Land of Wealth
- Net Deception
- A Pillow Case of Mystery
- Real Kung Fu
- Women on the Run
- Misleading Track
- Guts of Man
- The Academy
- The Prince's Shadow
- My Family
- To Catch the Uncatchable
- Seed of Hope
- Virtues of Harmony II
- Vigilante Force
- Take My Word For It
- Burning Flame II
- A Step into the Past
- Armed Reaction III
- Justice Sung II
- Man's Best Friend
- Sergeant Tabloid

=== Film ===
- Cold War 2 (2016)
