= Cilla Kung =

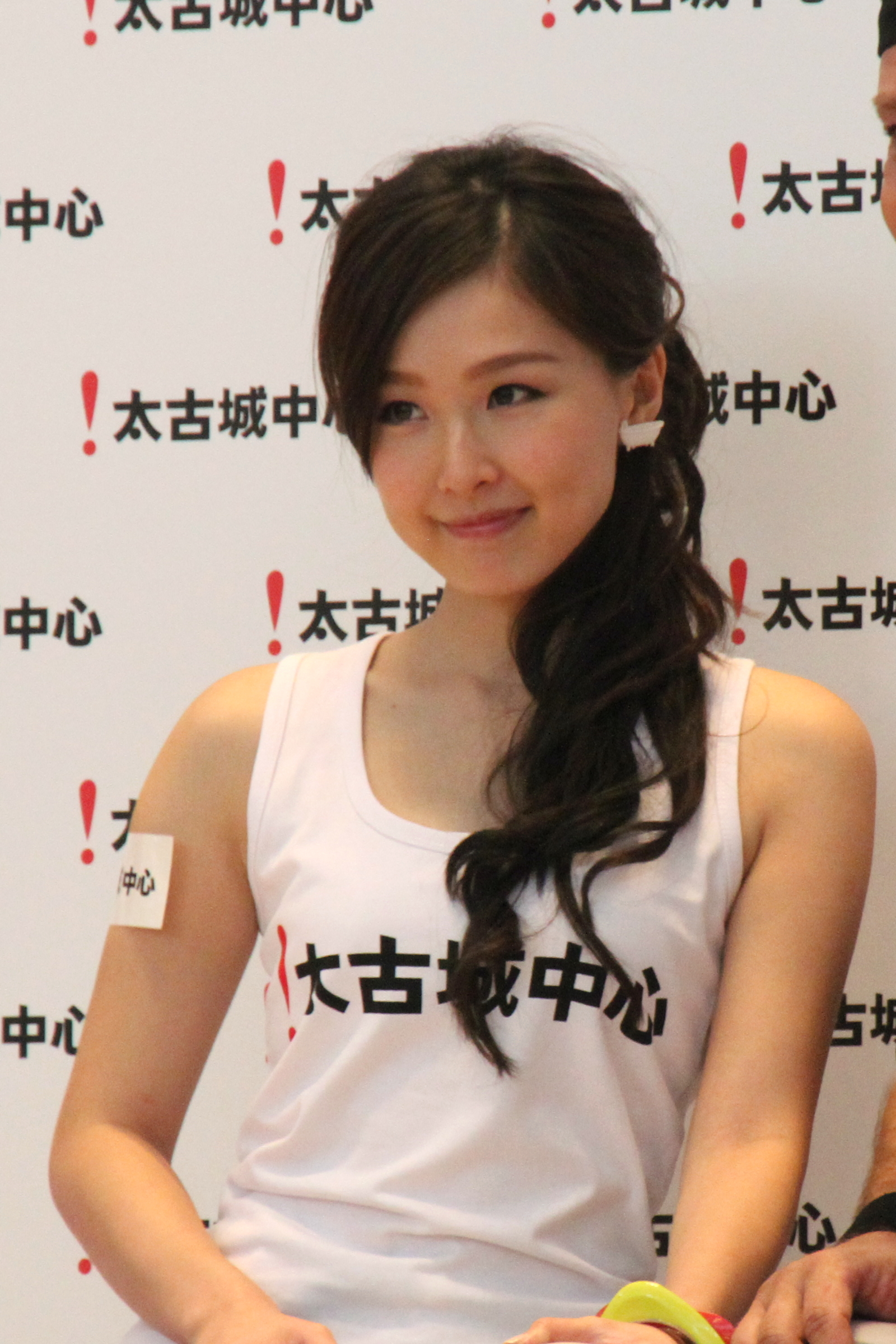
- Kung in 2012
- Born: 22 July 1986 (age 40); Hong Kong
- Occupations: Actress; model
- Years active: 2007–2017

Chinese name
- Traditional Chinese: 樂瞳
- Simplified Chinese: 乐瞳
Transcriptions
Standard Mandarin
- Hanyu Pinyin: Lè tóng
- Musical career
- Origin: Hong Kong
- Label: Stars Shine International

Cilla Kung (born Gung Sin-tung (龔茜彤), 1986, and also known as Lok Tung (樂瞳)) is a Hong Kong actress, singer, model, and businesswoman. She started out as a contestant in Beautiful Cooking. She gained recognition in The Four, and Yes, Sir. Sorry, Sir!.

On 14 June 2017, her 10 year contract with TVB ended and she did not renew it. Her final appearance for TVB was in the drama The Forgotten Valley. She said that it was a hard decision to leave TVB but she wanted to try working with other companies. In 2020, she started a wine business.

== Filmography ==
=== TV series ===
Year	Name of Series	Role	Awards
2007	Best Selling Secrets	Guest	
2007	Men Don't Cry	Prostitute	
2008	The Four	Ling Siu Do	
2008	The Gem of Life	Cameo	
2008	Your Class or Mine	Reporter	
2008	When Easterly Showers Fall on the Sunny West	Wing Lan	
2008	Pages of Treasures	Ko Wing Yan	
2008	Forensic Heroes II	Nurse	
2009	Just Love II	Cameo	
2009	Rosy Business	Villager	
2009	Burning Flame III		
2009	Beyond the Realm of Conscience	Yun Wa	
2009	A Watchdog's Tale	Cameo	
2010	A Pillow Case of Mystery II	Ting Ting	
2010	Gun Metal Grey	Daisy	
2011	Yes Sir, Sorry Sir	Chung Ka Bo	Nominated - TVB Anniversary Award for Most Improved Female Artist
2011	River of Wine	Leung Sau-yin	Nominated - TVB Anniversary Award for Most Improved Female Artist
2011	Forensic Heroes III	Wong Ka-man	Nominated - TVB Anniversary Award for Most Improved Female Artist
2011	The Other Truth	Cheung Wing-shan	
2012	Daddy Good Deeds	Ko Yu-po	Nominated - TVB Anniversary Award for Most Improved Female Artist
2012	Witness Insecurity	Lee Hau Yan	Nominated - TVB Anniversary Award for Most Improved Female Artist
2012	Three Kingdoms RPG	Szema Kuen	Nominated - TVB Anniversary Award for Most Improved Female Artist
2012	The Confidant	Imperial Noble Consort Shushen	
2012-2013	Missing You	Crystal	
2013	The Day of Days	So Fun	
2013	Slow Boat Home	YoYo Cheung	
2013	Karma Rider	Foon Sui	
2014	Storm in a Cocoon	Sin Yin-hoon	
2014	Swipe Tap Love		
2014	ICAC Investigators 2014		
2014-2015	Noblesse Oblige	Wai Yu	
2015	Every Step You Take	Ho Na	
2015	Captain of Destiny	Wong Wing-yu	
2016	My Dangerous Mafia Retirement Plan	Ko Kar Martial Art School student	
2017	Married but Available	Candy (余可兒)	
2018	The Forgotten Valley	Lam Hoi Kay (林凱琪)	

=== Films ===
- A Beautiful Moment (2018)
- Hardcore Comedy (2013)
- I Love Hong Kong 2012 (2012)
- I Love Hong Kong (2011)
- The Jade and The Pearl (2010)

=== Music video appearances ===
- 2007: "你我她" by Vincy Chan
- 2007: "愛一個上一課" by Joey Yung
- 2007: "Here I Go" by Eric Suen

== Awards ==
Next TV Awards 2012-Most Promising Female Artist
