= Jacky Wong =

Hong Kong actor

- Born: September 11, 1998 (age 27); Hong Kong
- Education: College
- Alma mater: City University of Hong Kong
- Years active: 2004-present
- Parent: 王燦聲 (father)

Chinese name
- Traditional Chinese: 王樹熹
- Simplified Chinese: 王树熹
Transcriptions

Jacky Wong Shu Hei (王樹熹) (born 11 September 1998), also known as Jacky Jai, is a Hong Kong child actor who was born on 11 September 1998. He has an older brother, Jeffrey Wong (王秉熹), who was a child actor.

== Education ==
Wong had his primary education at S.K.H Yuen Chen Maun Chen Primary School (大埔聖公會阮鄭夢芹小學) located at Tai Po in Hong Kong. As of September 2015, he is a Form 6 student at the Band 1 school, SKH Bishop Mok Sau Tseng Secondary School. He acted in many Hong Kong dramas and is noted for his cuteness when he was younger. With a score of 22 in the HKDSE, Wong attends the City University of Hong Kong, majoring in Media and Communication.

In the TV series Father and Sons, Wong played the role of Man Hang-Yu (Jimmy).

== Filmography ==
- The Conqueror's Story ----Man Jai=2004
- The Last Breakthrough----Bok Jai=2004
- The Gateau Affairs ----Ko Bun=2005
- Misleading Track----Yuen Yun Lok=2005
- Healing Hands 3----Hei Hei=2005
- Hidden Treasures----Cheuk Chun Hien=2005
- Always Ready ----Jacky=2005
- The Herbalist's Manual ----Hang Hang=2005
- When Rules Turn Loose ----Cheung Wai Ming/Siu Yuen Tze=2005
- Ten Brothers ----Sap Yat Jai(ep 20)=2007
- War and Destiny ----young Hau Yee=2007
- The Family Link ----Fong Dat=2007
- Devil's Disciples ----young King Lui=2007
- Fathers and Sons ----Man Yu Hang, Jimmy/Jimmy Jai=2007
- Men Don't Cry ----young Ho Kei Kin=2007
- The Ultimate Crime Fighter ----Lok Lok (Moses Chan's nephew)=2007
- Wasabi Mon Amour ----Tam Ka Lok=2008
- The Master of Tai Chi ----young Mo Ma=2008
- Love Exchange ----Sik Gwong Jai=2008
- Last One Standing ----Billy Jai-2008
- Just Love II----Ho Ming/Ming Jai=2009
- A Watchdog's Tale ----Random Kid=2010
