= Queenie Chu =

Hong Kong television presenter and actress

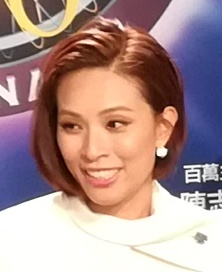
- Chu at a press conference on 2 January 2018, after filming the first episode of the celebrity edition of the Who Wants to Be A Millionaire 2018 at the ATV Headquarters in the Tai Po Industrial Estate.
- Born: 22 April 1981 (age 45); Hong Kong
- Occupations: Actress, television presenter
- Years active: 2004–present
- Agent: TVB (2004-2016)
- Spouse: Jason Chan (m. 2021)

Chinese name
- Traditional Chinese: 朱慧敏
Transcriptions
Standard Mandarin
- Hanyu Pinyin: zhū huì mǐn
Yue: Cantonese
- Yale Romanization: jyū waih máhn
- Jyutping: zyu1 wai6 man5

Queenie Chu (Chinese: 朱慧敏; Chu Wai Man born 22 April 1981 in British Hong Kong) is a Hongkonger actress, tv host and beauty pageant titleholder. She formerly affiliated with TVB. She was also Miss Hong Kong 2004 1st runner-up.

== Biography ==
Chu studied in Rosaryhill School, then continued her education at the University of Washington, Seattle, United States. After finishing her studies, she entered the Miss Hong Kong 2004 pageant in Seattle. She successfully entered the overseas group, and went back to Hong Kong in June 2004 to compete in the pageant.

Considered as a favourite from the start, she won the Tourism Ambassador title early in the competition. After 3 months of training, she competed on stage for Miss Hong Kong 2004, and eventually won the runner-up.

During her reign, she appeared in TVB variety shows. She also did a lot of charity work and visited other countries as an ambassador of Hong Kong.

In November 2004, she traveled to Sanya, China to compete in Miss World 2004, and competed in the Miss International 2005 pageant in Japan, and won the Miss Friendship Award.

She signed an artist contract and hosted more shows for TVB, with Chu's most notable role as Alex Wan in the sitcom Come Home Love (2012-2015), before ending her career at TVB in 2016 to pursue more freelance opportunities in film and television.

Chu married Jason Chan, a cardiology doctor working Hong Kong Sanatorium & Hospital in 2021. The two were married at the Peninsula Hotel with a few attendees due to COVID-19 pandemic. Chu is also a licensed therapist after studying clinical hypnotherapy for a year and a half.

== Awards ==
- Miss Hong Kong 2004: runner up
- Miss Hong Kong 2004: Tourism Ambassador
- Miss International 2005: Miss Friendship

== Filmography ==
=== TV series ===
Year	Title	Role	Awards	Notes
2006	C.I.B. Files	Rachel Yu		
2006	Dicey Business	Hak Muk Ning		cameo (ep 27–28)
2007	Life Art	Janice		
2007	Fathers and Sons	Joyce		
2007-2008	Survivor's Law II	Kan Ming Wai (Noel)		
2008	Best Selling Secrets	Ella Chan		ep. 301
2008	D.I.E.	Cheuk Kei (Jacqueline)		
2008	A Journey Called Life	Keung Ma Kei (Maggie)		
2008	Speech of Silence	Chiu Man Kei (Kiki)		
2008-2009	The Gem of Life	Man Wai (Mandy)	Nominated – TVB Award for Most Improved Actress	
2008	Off Pedder	Ko Wai-Ling	Nominated – TVB Award for Most Improved Actress	
2009	The King of Snooker	Gu Doi Bik (Debbie)		
2009	The Threshold of a Persona	Ching Pui Ka (Connie)		
2009	You're Hired	Ngon Sum Bo (Bowie)	Nominated – TVB Award for Most Improved Actress	
2009-2010	A Watchdog's Tale	Yun See See		
2010	Fly With Me	Kwok Hiu Lam (Cathy)	Nominated - TVB Award for Best Supporting Actress (Top 15)	
2010	Ghost Writer	Leung Pik-yuk		
2010	Twilight Investigation	Lei Ka-man		
2011	Be Home for Dinner	Tong Mei-ching		
2011	Yes, Sir. Sorry, Sir!	Koo Ka-sin (Ceci)	Nominated — TVB Anniversary Award for Best Supporting Actress (Top 15)	
2011-2012	When Heaven Burns	Lam Pui-ling (Jessica)		
2012	Let It Be Love	Chow Ka Wai		
2012	The Greatness of a Hero	Cho Fei		warehoused
2012	Witness Insecurity	Kelly		
2012	Come Home Love	Alex		
2013	Sergeant Tabloid	Constable Mai Ka-po		

=== Films ===
Year	Title	Role	Notes
2009	Overheard	Elisha Lam	
2010	Love in a Puff	Yan	
2010	All About Love		
2011	A Simple Life		
2013	Ip Man: The Final Fight	So Fei	
2016	Cold War 2	Amber Tsui	
2016	The Starting Line		

Awards and achievements
Miss Hong Kong
Preceded by Rabee'a Yeung 楊洛婷	Miss Hong Kong 1st Runner-Up; 2004	Succeeded by Sharon Luk 陸詩韻
