= Chow Chung =

Hong Kong television actor (1932–2025)

- 周驄
- Born: Sin Kam-Wing; 16 September 1932; British Hong Kong
- Died: 4 July 2025 (aged 92)
- Other names: Uncle Lu, Brother Lu, President
- Occupations: Actor, singer
- Years active: 1955–2021

Chow Chung (Chinese: 周驄; 16 September 1932 – 4 July 2025), real name Sin Kam-Wing (冼錦榮), was a Hong Kong film and television actor, and a member of the South China Film Industry Workers Union (33rd Federation). He was chair for three consecutive years, resigning in 2005.

== Life and career ==
In 1955, Chow started his acting career with Lan Kwong Film Co, a film production company. Chow Nam debuted in Broken Zither Bower, a 1955 Historical Drama film directed by Yeung Kung-Leung. Chow is credited with over 85 films. Chow acted in movies until the early 1980s. When his movie career faded, he worked at the Chinese Theatre (觀塘銀都戲院) as a manager. Later he joined TVB.

Chow Chung died from pneumonia on 4 July 2025, at the age of 92.

== Filmography ==
=== Film ===
This is a partial list of films.

- 1955 Broken Zither Bower
- 1956 Flying Tigers
- 1966 Lady Bond - Sung Kar-Kui.
- 2008 Fatal Move - Kung.

=== Television series ===
Year	Name of Film	Role
1972	Four Girls from Hong Kong	Chang
1980	The Shell Game	Fok Man Ting
1998	Old Time Buddy - To Catch a Thief	Siu Chung
1999	Side Beat	Cheung Hok Tin
1999	At the Threshold of an Era	Yip Hau Kan
1999	A Matter of Business	Ho Siu Tong
2000	Cheung Hok Ting	Yip Hau Kan
2000	At Point Blank	Ching Shum
2001	Colourful Life	Cheung Suen Siu Lung
2001	The Heaven Sword and Dragon Saber	Cheung Sam Fung
2001	A Taste of Love	Yu Yat Ban
2001	A Step into the Past	Farmer (Cameo)
2002	The Trust of a Life Time	Guk Wing Nin
2003	Back To Square One	Seung
2003	Point Of No Return	Chow Mau
2003	Life Begins at Forty	Law Dak Seun
2004	Net Deception	饶 汉
2005	When Rules Turn Loose	Yun Kwok Yun
2006	Dicey Business	Chuk Yat Fu
2007	Heart of Greed	Sheung Fung
2007	Fathers and Sons	Lui Bak Tong
2007	Marriage of Inconvenience	(Cameo)
2008	Moonlight Resonance	Chung Fan Tat
2008	Pages Of Treasures	Tong Bak
2009	Burning Flame III	Shum Yat (Sunday)
2009	You're Hired	Tong Bak Dak
2009	Off Pedder	Yim Ying
2010	In the Eye of the Beholder	Yat Ban Sang
2010	Sisters of Pearl	Ho Wing
2010	Twilight Investigation	Gei Ho Yee
2011	Yes, Sir. Sorry, Sir!	Law Chun Pong
2011	Wax and Wane	Man Wing Ching
2011	Forensic Heroes III	Chung Bok Si
2012	Daddy Good Deeds	Lam A-lui
2012	Gloves Come Off	Pat Kau Yan
2012	Come Home Love	Chan Chung
2012	Missing You	Fan Wing-shun
2013	Reality Check	Leung Tung
2013	Sergeant Tabloid	Grandpa Tong
2013	Slow Boat Home	Kwan Sam-yan
2013	Brother's Keeper	Ying Ye
2014	Swipe Tap Love	
2014	Shades of Life	Uncle Jue
2014	Officer Geomancer	Lo-chung
2015	Madam Cutie On Duty	Go Muk Wor Fai
2015	Brick Slaves	Johnny Lo Man-bou
2015	Every Step You Take	Chong Jing
2016	Presumed Accidents	Brian Cheung Hak-loi
2016	House of Spirits	Himself
2016	Dead Wrong	Uncle Gon
2017	Heart and Greed	Yue Hok Dak
2018	The Forgotten Valley	Lo Chow
2018	Watch Out Boss	Hui Sin-dak

== Awards ==
- 2016 Lifetime Achievement Award. Presented at the TVB Anniversary Awards 2016.
