= Daddy Good Deeds =

- Promotional poster
- 當旺爸爸
- Genre: Comedy
- Starring: Ha Yu; Linda Chung; Steven Ma; Evergreen Mak; Nancy Wu; Edwin Siu; Cilla Kung; Chow Chung
- Opening theme: Chung Mei Joi Yi (從未在意) by Edwin Siu
- Country of origin: Hong Kong
- Original language: Cantonese
- No. of episodes: 20

Production
- Executive producer: Mui Siu-ching
- Production location: Hong Kong
- Running time: 45 minutes (each)
- Production company: TVB

Original release
- Network: Jade; HD Jade
- Release: 19 March – 4 April 2012

Daddy Good Deeds (Traditional Chinese : 當旺爸爸) is a Hong Kong television comedy serial produced by TVB starring Ha Yu, Linda Chung and Steven Ma as the main leads, with Evergreen Mak, Nancy Wu, Edwin Siu, Cilla Kung, and Chow Chung in major supporting cast. Filming and post- production took place in the autumn of 2011 and the premiere episode aired on 19 March 2012. This was producer Mui Siu-ching's last series for TVB after being with the station for 25 years.

This is the fifth for Steven Ma pairs up with Linda Chung where they have both partnered in the previous four TVB series, Virtues of Harmony II, A Journey Called Life, A Watchdog's Tale and Ghost Writer. This is also the last TVB drama for Steven Ma because his contract with TVB ended in 2012.

== Synopsis ==
Ko Yi-man (Ha Yu) is the owner of a pawn shop and a devoted father to his son Ko Wai-ting (Evergreen Mak) 2nd daughter Ko Yu-chu (Linda Chung) and younger daughter Ko Yu-po (Cilla Kung). However, unknown to the trio, one of them is an abandoned child, the symbolic "collateral" in a good luck ritual made many years previously. When the receipt for the transaction comes to light, first speculation about the truth, and then the truth itself, threatens the family that he has given everything for and Ko Yi-man must fight to keep his family together.

== Cast ==
=== The Ko family ===
| Cast | Role | Description |
|---|---|---|
| Ha Yu | Ko Yi-man 高義文 | Tak Kwong pawn shop owner Lam A-lui's boss Ko Wai-ting's adopted father Ko Yu-chu, Ko Yu-po's father Wan Yuen-han's father-in-law |
| Evergreen Mak | Ko Wai-ting, Wilson 高威庭 | Ko Yi-man's adopted son Ko Yu-chu and Ko Yu-po's elder brother Lam Sam-ling's son Wan Yuen-han's husband Opticians manager, resigned at Episode 5 Later promotion company CEO |
| Nancy Wu | Wan Yuen-han, Wendy 溫婉嫻 | Ko Yi-man's daughter-in-law Ko Wai-ting's wife Ko Yu-chu and Ko Yu-po's sister-in-law promotion company CEO |
| Linda Chung | Ko Yu-chu 高如珠 | Ko Yi-man's eldest daughter Ko Wai-ting's younger sister Ko Yu-po's elder sister Lam Fat's friend, later girlfriend and wife A police officer |
| Cilla Kung | Ko Yu-po, Bella 高如寶 | Ko Yi-man's youngest daughter The Voice competitor Later promotion company junior assistant Girlfriend of Wong Wai-leung |

=== The Lam family ===
| Cast | Role | Description |
|---|---|---|
| Chow Chung | Lam A-lui 林亞女 | Pawn shop employee Ko Yi Man's subordinate Lam Fat's father |
| Steven Ma | Lam Fat 林發 | Lam A-lui's son Ko Yu-chu's friend, later boyfriend and husband Television station location scout/manager/Part-time badminton trainer |

=== Tak Kwong Pawn Brokers ===
| Cast | Role | Description |
|---|---|---|
| Ha Yu | Ko Yi-man 高義文 | Pawn shop owner |
| Chow Chung | Lam A-lui 林亞女 | Veteran pawn shop employee |
| Edwin Siu | Yip Kwai, Yap 葉貴 | Pawn shop trainee The Voice competitor Grandson of Ko Yi-man's benefactor Loved Ko Yu Chu |

=== Other casts ===
| Cast | Role | Description |
|---|---|---|
| Stanley Cheung | Wong Wai-leung 黃偉良 | Boyfriend of Ko Yu-po |
| Savio Tsang | Lee Kwok Ming 李國銘 | Police CID Senior Inspector; Ko Yu-chu's superior Ivy's boyfriend |
| Mak Ka Lun | Sam Lui 呂先生 | Promotion company manager Wan Yuen-han's subordinate |
| Candy Chiu | Nancy Lam 藍小姐 | Promotion company senior officer Wan Yuen-han's subordinate |
| Eric Li | Lee Tsz Kit 李子傑 | Opticians Manager; Ko Ting-wai's superior Pointed against Ko Ting-wai |
| Lai Lok-yi | Chan Lap Shun 陳立信 | Siu Tan's husband Ko Yu-chu's lover, later broke up |
| Sharon Chan | Lui Keung 雷強 | Yip Kwai's ex-girlfriend Dr. Fong's wife |
| Patrick Dunn | Dr. Fong 方醫生 | Lui Keung's husband |
| Sire Ma | Mary | Lam Fat's ex-girlfriend Cheated Lam Fat for money |
| Elena Kong | Sheh Chi Man | An acupuncturist |
| Susan Tse | Lam Sam-ling 劉心玲 | Ko Wai-ting's mother Left Ko Wai-ting in Tak Kwong Pawn Brokers when he was a baby |
| Bowie Wu | Ko Chung-sun 高忠新 | Ko Yee-man's uncle Pointed against Ko Yee-man |

== Viewership ratings ==
| | Week | Episodes | Average Points | Peaking Points | References |
|---|---|---|---|---|---|
| 1 | 19–23 March 2012 | 1 – 5 | 30 | 33 | |
| 2 | 26–30 March 2012 | 6 – 10 | 30 | 32 | |
| 3 | 2–6 April 2012 | 11 – 15 | 29 | 32 | |
| 4 | 9–12 April 2012 | 16 – 19 | 32 | 35 | |
| 4 | 13 April 2012 | 20 | 31 | 34 | |

== Note ==
Week 3 – The ratings during the prime time hours dropped due to the Easter holiday.

== Trivia ==
- The drama contain many references to past TVB series produced by Mui Siu Ching such as the Forensic Heroes franchise, Can't Buy Me Love, Beyond the Realm of Conscience and Fathers and Sons to name a few.
