= Twilight Investigation =

- Official poster
- 囧探查過界
- Genre: Modern Comedy; Mystery
- Written by: Lee Kei Wah; Xun Hou Hou
- Starring: Wong Hei; Linda Chung; Raymond Wong Ho-yin; Johnson Lee; Power Chan; Shek Sau; Kingdom Yuen; Rebecca Chan
- Opening theme: "食腦" by Wong He, Raymond Wong and Johnson Lee
- Country of origin: Hong Kong
- Original language: Cantonese
- No. of episodes: 20

Production
- Producer: Marco Law Wing Yin
- Running time: 45 minutes (approx.)

Original release
- Network: TVB
- Release: 29 November – 24 December 2010

Twilight Investigation (Chinese: 囧探查過界) is a 2010 TVB modern drama series.

== Synopsis ==
Former police officer Yip Kwok Cheung (Bill Chan) has set up a private detective agency. Members of the team have their own strengths. Gei On Gui (Wong Hei) (known best as Encore) is the most important member who specializes in careful thought and sharp deconstruction of dialysis. The team has solved many cases of crime.

Because of investigating an adultery case, Encore is acquainted with the pseudo model, Chung Yee Tak (Linda Chung) (also known as Dak Chai). Yee Tak was born in an incomplete family, and is withdrawn. This makes her frustrated in both love and work. After breaking up with her boyfriend, she becomes drunk and is a victim of a car accident she causes, and dies. Unknown to herself that she is dead, she tries to find her separated mother so she finds Encore to help her. Encore sympathizes with Yee Tak and tries his best to find Yee Tak's mother, but during the investigation, he discovers a secret about Yee Tak's mother that even Yee tak doesn't know......

== Cast ==
=== Wui Chun Investigation Company ===
Cast	Role	Description
Shek Sau	Yip Kwok-cheung 葉國昌	A retired police officer Boss of Wui Chun Investigation Company; Gei On-gui, Chow Ka-sing, Wong Siu-fu, Lo Lai-na, Chiu Ying-tat, Nie Bing and Liu Pik-chu's supervisor Gei Ho-yan's ex-boyfriend, later husband
Wong Hei	Gei On-gui (1975–2009) 紀安居	Encore; Senior investigator Gei Ho-yee's son Gei Ho-yan's nephew Gei On-lok's brother Chung Yee-tak's friend Yip Kwok-cheung's subordinate Chow Ka-sing, Wong Siu-fu, Lo Lai-na, Chiu Ying-tat and Nie Bing and Liu Pik-chu's colleague Cheuk Yan's ex-boyfriend Died while trying to save his family and friends, became a ghost, and reincarnated in Chapter 20
Raymond Wong Ho-yin	Chow Ka-sing 周家昇	Ah Sing; Investigator; Yip Kwok-cheung's subordinate Gei On-gui, Wong Siu-fu, Lo Lai-na, Chiu Ying-tat and Nie Bing and Liu Pik-chu's colleague Lee Ka-man's ex-husband, later husband Billy's adopted father
Johnson Lee	Wong Siu-fu 王小虎	Investigator; Yip kwok-cheung's subordinate Gei On-gui, Chow Ka-sing, Lo Lai-na, Chiu Ying-tat and Nie Bing and Liu Pik-chu's colleague Wong Chun-fung's brother Nie Bing's boyfriend, later husband
Kingdom Yuen	Lo Lai-na 羅麗娜	Laura; Investigator and secretary Yip Kwok-cheung's subordinate Gei On-gui, Chow Ka-sing, Wong Siu-fu, Chiu Ying-tat, Nie Bing and Liu Pik-chu's colleague Loves Yip Kwok-cheung
Jonathan Cheung	Chiu Ying-tat 趙應達	Investigator; Yip Kwok-cheung's subordinate Gei On-gui, Chow Ka-sing, Wong Siu-fu, Lo Lai-na, Nie Bing and Liu Pik-chu's colleague
Océane Zhu	Nie Bing 聶冰	Bing Bing; Investigator; Yip Kwok-cheung's subordinate Gei On-gui, Chow Ka-sing, Wong Siu-fu, Lo Lai-na, Chiu Ying-tat and Liu Pik-chu's colleague Wong Siu-fu's girlfriend, later wife
Nadia Lun	Liu Pik-chu 廖碧珠	Jade; Secretary; Yip Kwok Cheung and Lo Lai-na's subordinate

=== Police ===
Cast	Role	Description
Queenie Chu	Lee Ka-man 李嘉敏	Mandy; A CID inspector Chow Ka-sing's ex-wife, but they later reconcile Billy's mother Cheng Yuen-ching's girlfriend, but they later break up Yip Kwok-cheung's ex-subordinate Wong Chu-ming, Wong Lik-kan, Choi Pak-kuen, Mok Man Tsz's supervisor
Raymond Tsang	Wong Chu-ming 王柱銘	CID police officers Lee Ka-man's subordinates
Yeung Ching-wah	Wong Lik-kan 黃力勤	CID police officers Lee Ka-man's subordinates
Chan Kin-man	Choi Pak-kuen 蔡柏權	CID police officers Lee Ka-man's subordinates
Fanny Ip	Mok Man-Tsz 莫敏芝	CID police officers Lee Ka-man's subordinates
Lau Dan	So Kam-lam 蘇鑑林	A police officer Ho Ying-biu's teacher Gei On-gui's friend
Power Chan	Ho Ying-biu (1969–2004) 何英標	Gao Ma Chut (977); An ex-police officer Chung Yee-tak's friend So Kam-lam's apprentice Yip Kwok-cheung's ex-colleague Committed suicide and became a ghost Only Gei On-gui, and later Chow Ka-sing, Wong Siu-fu, and So Kam-lam could see his ghost Reincarnated in Chapter 20; Encore's future reincarnated older brother

=== Gei's family ===
Cast	Role	Description
Chow Chung	Gei Ho-yee 紀可以	Gods material shop owner Gei Ho-yan's brother Gei On-gui and Gei On-lok's father
Rebecca Chan	Gei Ho-yan 紀可人	A restaurant cashier, later Yip Kwok-cheung's assistant Gei Ho-yee's sister Gei On-gui and Gei On-lok's aunt Leung Man-yiu's ex-mistress Yip Kwok-cheung's ex-girlfriend, later wife
Wong He	Gei On-gui 紀安居	Encore; Gei Ho-yee's son Gei Ho-yan's nephew Gei On-lok's brother Died while saving his family and friends, became a ghost, and reincarnated in Chapter 20
Lee Yee-man	Gei On-lok 紀安樂	Leng Mui; Gei Ho-yee's daughter Gei Ho-yan's niece Gei On-gui's sister

=== Chung's family ===
Cast	Role	Description
Teresa Ha	Chan Siu-yuk 陳小玉	Chung Wai-ming's mother Chung Yee-tak's grandmother Leung Wai-kuen's mother-in-law Deceased (Died a day before Chung Yee Tak in her sleep)
Kwong Chor-fai	Chung Wai-ming 鍾偉明	Chan Siu-yuk's son Leung Wai-kuen's husband Chung Yee-tak's father Deceased (Suicide because he thought his wife was unfaithful to him)
Mary Hon	Leung Wai-kuen 梁惠娟	Chung Wai-ming's wife Chan Siu-yuk daughter-in-law Chung Yee-tak's mother Missing after a fire accident Fled to Taiwan and became Cheng Nam's wife
Linda Chung	Chung Yee-tak (1984–2009) 鍾意得	A pseudo-model Gei On-gui's friend Ho Ying-biu's friend Andy Choi's ex-girlfriend Died while she was drunk driving and became a ghost in Chapter 1 Only Gei On-gui, and later Chow Ka-sing, Wong Siu-fu and So Kam-lam could see her ghost Reincarnated in Chapter 20

=== Cases ===
==== A Jewellery Businessman's Affair (Chapter 1) ====
Cast	Role	Description
Kwok Tak-shun	Ma Ching-hang 馬澄亨	Boss of Ma's Jewellery; Shirley Lee's lover
Yvonne Ho	Shirley Lee Sha-lee 李莎莉	A model Chung Yee-tak's colleague Ma Ching-hang's mistress

==== Rich businessman love murders (Chapter 2 - 6) ====
Cast	Role	Description
Mat Yeung	Wong Chun-fung 王俊峰	Sean; A fitness trainer Ho Lai-ching's boyfriend Wong Mei-kei's lover Wong Siu-fu's brother Killed by Ho Lai-shun because he thought Sean was stealing his money and his wife in Chapter 4
Joseph Lee	Ho Lai-shun 何禮信	Ho Lai-ching's father Wong Mei-kei's wife Killed Wong Chun-fung and Wong Mei-kei in Chapter 4 (Villain)
Karen Lee	Wong Mei-kei 王美琪	Ho Lai-shun's second wife Ho Lai-ching's stepmother Wong Chun-fung's mistress Killed by Ho Lai-shun because he was angry she didn't want to be with him and also stealing his money in Chapter 4 (Villain)
Kaki Leung	Ho Lai-ching 何麗晴	A university student Ho Lai-shun's daughter Wong Mei-kei's stepdaughter Wong Chun-fung's girlfriend

==== Mystery of Yau Sam-mei's Identity (Chapter 7 - 9) ====
Cast	Role	Description
Macy Chan	Cheuk Yan 卓恩	A lesbian Gei On-gui's ex-girlfriend Yau Sam-mei's girlfriend Cheung Lai-fong's god-daughter Threatened by Yau Sam-kit to act possessed by Yau Sum-mei's ghost so that she could inherit Cheung Lai-fong's company and passed it on to him later
Suet Nei	Cheung Lai-fong 張麗芳	Yau Sam-mei and Yau Sam-kit's mother Very supersticious that she believes her daughter will bring her luck while her son will bring her misfortune
Heidi Chu	Yau Sam-mei 尤心美	Deceased; A lesbian Cheung Lai-fong's daughter Cheuk Yan's girlfriend Yau Sam-kit's elder sister Killed by Yau Sam-kit because their mother was not going to let him be in charge of the family company in Chapter 7
Lai Lok-yi	Yau Sam-kit 尤心傑	Cheung Lai-fong's son Yau Sam-kit's younger brother Threatened Cheuk Yan to act possessed by Yau Sam-mei's ghost in order to get Cheung Lai-fong's inheritance (Villain)

==== Mystery of the Studio Ghost (Chapter 10 - 12) ====
Cast	Role	Description
Savio Tsang	Pui Keong 裴強	An actor Male protagonist of a film, "Fa Ying Hung Chuen"; Fok Mei Ching's husband Tsui Ying's lover Killed by Cheung Chun-fai in Chapter 11
Sarah Song	Tsui Ying 徐盈	An actress First female protagonist of a film, "Fa Ying Hung Chuen"; Pui Keong's mistress Wai Ling's enemy
Ng Wai-shan	Wai Ling 韋玲	An actress Second female protagonist of a film, "Fa Ying Hung Chuen"; Tsui Ying's enemy
Rachel Kan	Fok Mei Ching 霍美靜	Pui Keong's wife Killed by Cheung Chun-fai in Chapter 11
Lee Ka-ting	Big Brother Yin 大哥然	A lighting artist
Lam King-kong	Tse Po Chuen 謝保全	Mentally disabled Tsui Ying's fan Hated Pui Keong
Sam Chan	Cheung Chun-fai 張俊輝	Peter; Tsui Ying's ex-classmate and assistant Loved Tsui Ying; Killed Pui Keong and Fok Mei Ching (Villain)

==== Lee Kwok-pang Murder (Chapter 12 - 16) ====
Cast	Role	Description
Daniel Kwok	Lee Kwok-pang 李國鵬	Koo Wing-si's ex-husband Killed by Koo Wing-si in self-defense in Chapter 12 (Villain)
Lau Dan	So Kam-lam 蘇鑑林	A police officer Koo Shuen's husband Koo Wing-si's father Ko Tsz-chung's grandfather Helped Koo Wing-si to dispose Lee Kwok-pang's body and plead guilty Arrested and sent to jail in Chapter 14
Ha Wai-ching	Koo Shuen 顧璇	So Kam-lam's wife Koo Wing-si's mother Koo Tsz-chung grandmother Deceased
Janice Shum	Koo Wing-si 顧詠詩	A shop assistant, formerly a dancer So Kam-lam and Koo Shuen's daughter Lee Kwok-pang's ex-wife Killed Lee Kwok-pang in Chapter 12; Confessed guilt to police in Chapter 16 (Villain)
Lo Tin-hang	Koo Tsz-chung 顧子聰	So Kam-lam and Koo Shuen's grandson Koo Wing-si's son Had autism
Chan Min-leung	Drug Addict Wah 道友華	A drug addict Bribed by So Kam-lam to testify So Kam-lam was the murderer

==== Hotel Arson and Brick Attack Cases (Chapter 2 - 4, 17 - 20) ====
Cast	Role	Description
Mary Hon	Leung Wai-kuen / Chan Tsz-mei 梁惠娟 / 陳梓媚	Chung Yee-tuk's mother Fled to Taiwan, changed her name to Chan Tsz-mei, and became Cheng Nam's wife after the arson
Ram Chiang	Mok Chun-chung 莫鎮忠	A former gangster Ma Chi-chiu's friend Imputed by Law Hoi and Cheng Nam to be the arsonist and sentenced to life Released from jail because of having a good record Claimed to be possessed by the ghost of Ma Chi-chiu; Attacked Shek Chi-kin and Lee Ka-man with bricks Determined to kill Law Hoi and Cheng Nam; Killed by a falling wasted car and became a vengeful ghost Eliminated by Ho Ying-biu in Chapter 20 (Main villain)
Luk Chun-kwong	Ma Chi-chiu 馬志超	Mok Chun-chung's friend Died in the arson
	Shek Chi-kin 石志健	Yau Tsim Mong District member Testified against Mok Chun-chong in the arson trial Killed by Mok Chun-chong in Chapter 17
Queenie Chu	Lee Ka-man 李嘉敏	CID Inspector; Testified against Mok Chun-chong in the arson trial Injured by Mok Chun-chong in Chapter 17
Koo Ming-wah	Law Hoi 羅海	Cheng Nam's friend Testified against Mok Chun-chong in the arson trial even though he knew Cheng Nam started the fire Almost killed by Mok Chun-chong in Chapter 18
Au Sui-wai	Cheng Nam / Tse Ho-tung 鄭南 / 謝浩東	Law Hoi's friend Started the hotel fire while trying to save Leung Wai-kuen; Fled to Taiwan, changed his name to Tse Ho-tung after the arson and became Leung Wai-kuen's husband Deceased

=== Others ===
Cast	Role	Description
Bond Chan	Choi Andy 蔡安迪	Andy; Chung Yee-tak ex-boyfriend Cheated on Chung Yee-tak
Tai Chi-wai	Leung Man-yiu 梁文耀	Gei Ho-yan's married ex-lover
Ben Wong	Cheng Yuen-ching 鄭元政	Joe; A French cuisine cook Lee Ka-man's ex-boyfriend Billy's father Yuen Sin's ex-boyfriend Chung Yee-tak's father after reincarnation Framed Chow Ka-sing and Lee Ka-man (Main villain)
Agassi Cheng	Billy	Cheng Yuen-ching and Lee Ka-man's son Chow Ka-sing's adopted son
Lam Shuk-man	Yuen Sin 阮倩	Cheng Yuen-ching's ex-girlfriend Chung Yee-tak's mother after reincarnation

== Awards and nominations ==
=== 2011 TVB Anniversary Awards ===
- Nominated: Best Drama

=== My Astor On Demand Favourites Awards 2011 ===
- Won: My Favourite Supporting Actor (Raymond Wong)

== Viewership ratings ==
	Week	Episodes	Average Points	Peaking Points	References
1	November 29 - December 3, 2010	1 — 5	28	—	
2	December 6–9, 2010	6 — 9	29	—	
3	December 13–17, 2010	10 — 14	30	—	
4	December 20–24, 2010	15 — 20	30	32	
