= Shades of Truth =

Hong Kong television series

- HK promotional poster
- Also known as: Water Margin's Infernal Affairs
- Genre: Crime thriller Action; Fantasy; Comedy
- Written by: Chan Ching-yee; Ng Siu-tung and others
- Directed by: Ng Siu-wing; Liu Jun-shek and others
- Starring: Julian Cheung; Wong Hei; Gigi Lai; Tavia Yeung; Yuen Wah
- Opening theme: "No Half Space" performed by Wong He
- Country of origin: Hong Kong
- Original language: Cantonese
- No. of episodes: 25

Production
- Producer: Siu Hin-fai
- Production location: Hong Kong
- Editors: Chan Ching-yee; Ng Siu-tung
- Camera setup: Multi camera
- Running time: 42 minutes (each)
- Production company: TVB

Original release
- Network: TVB Jade
- Release: 27 December 2004 – 29 January 2005

Shades of Truth
- Traditional Chinese: 水滸無間道
- Simplified Chinese: 水浒无间道
Transcriptions
Standard Mandarin
- Hanyu Pinyin: Shuǐhǔ Wújiàndào
Yue: Cantonese
- Jyutping: Soei2 Wu2 Mou4 Gaan3 Dou6

Shades of Truth (Traditional Chinese: 水滸無間道; literally Water Margin's Unceasing Path) is a 25-episode television comedy-drama from Hong Kong. Produced by Siu Hin-fai, the drama is a TVB production. The story is a parody on the legendary story of Wu Song from the 14th century Chinese classical novel Water Margin (水滸傳) and also the 2002 Hong Kong crime-thriller film Infernal Affairs (無間道).

== Synopsis ==
Brothers of Mount Liang,
Together through birth and death.
Reunited after generations,
In a bid to bring justice.

900 years ago, Wu Song and Lin Chong were best friends, just like their characters from Water Margin. They were as close as brothers and swore to uphold justice together even in their next lives.

900 years later after they reincarnate to Hong Kong, they meet again as the young patrol officer Dung Chung Cho (Julian Cheung) and top police official TC Lam (Wong Hei). Under the orders of police official KY Wong (Gordon Liu), Dung Chung Cho is sent to the triad controlled by Sung Po (Yuen Wah) as an undercover. In only several months time, Dung Chung Cho successfully gains Sung Po's trust and also wins the heart of Nichole (Gigi Lai), Sung Po's biological daughter.

After a slight injury on the head, Dung Chung Cho gains his past memories as Wu Song 900 years ago and tries to convince TC that he is his long lost brother Lin Chong. Meanwhile, one of Sung Po's men, Kwan Lo (Derek Kwok) begins to suspect Dung Chung Cho as an undercover for the police and is also plotting to overthrow Sung Po's position in the gang. How come the police can never gather enough information to capture the triads for holding illegal businesses and charge them for attempting to murder so many people? It is then when Dung Chung Cho begins to realize that there is also an undercover in the police force working for the triads.

== Cast ==
=== Police force ===
Cast	Role	Description
Wong Hei	Lam Tze-Chung (TC) 林子聰	A Team leader Previous life: Lin Chong
Julian Cheung	Ha Chung-Yam (Dung Chung Cho) 夏松蔭 (冬蟲草)	KY's undercover Previous life: Wu Song
Gordon Liu	Wong Kam-Yan (KY) 黃錦仁	B Team leader
Lam Wing-Han	Cheung Tit-Nam 張鐵男	A Team CID
Irene Wong	Lam Shuet-Si (Little Simui) 林雪詩	A Team CID
Hawick Lau	Fai Man-Ban (Ben) 費文斌	A Team CID
Wai Kar Hung	Chow Kwok-Yin 周國賢	Yik Kwan's undercover B Team CID
Lee Sam Yan	Ma Chi-Ming 馬志明	B Team CID
Angelina Lo	Tsui Wai-Sam (Madam Tsui) 徐慧心 (Madam 徐)	High police official

=== Triad ===
Cast	Role	Description
Yuen Wah	Sung Po 宋波	Triad leader Nichole's father Previous life: Song Jiang
Halina Tam	Lek Jeh (Janet) 叻姐	Sung Po's woman
Derek Kwok	Yik Kwan (Kwan Lo) 易軍 (軍佬)	
Sammy Lau	Yik Jun (Matt) 易進	Yik Kwan's younger brother
Ken Lok	Leung Shu-Gan (Sah Daam) 黎樹根 (沙胆)	
Chiu Wing-Hung	Milky 牛奶仔	
Lee Hoi-Sang	Uncle Kwan 坤叔	
Wah Ji-Nam	Leung Ying-Kei 梁英奇	
Kuk Fung	Uncle Fan 翻爺	
Kenny Wong	Kap-Chai 及猜	Thai gang leader

=== Chinese Medical Center (Hong family) ===
Cast	Role	Description
Lo Meng	Hong Fuk-Tai 康福泰	Chinese medical doctor Siu Sin's father
Mary Hon	Tang Yuk-Chu 鄧玉珠	Hong Fuk-Tais' ex-wife Siu Sin's mother Happy's mother
Lam Pui Kwan	Hong Yun-Fan 康婉芬	Hong Fuk-Tai's younger sister
Tavia Yeung	Hong Chi-Sin (Siu Sin) 康至善 (小善)	Chinese medical doctor Previous life: Xiao Xian
Matt Yeung	Leung Kar-Lok (Happy) 梁家樂	Hong Chi-Sin's younger half-brother

=== Leung San Pak Bar (Man family) ===
Cast	Role	Description
Law Koon Lan	Man Lai-Bing 萬麗冰	Bus driver
Gigi Lai	Man Fung-Lin (Nichole) 萬鳳蓮	Sung Po and Man Lai-Bing's daughter Leung Saan Pak Bar's owner Radio DJ; Previous life: Pan Jinlian
Summer Joe	Ada	Leung Saan Pak employee
Ng Wai-Shan	Sue	Leung Saan Pak employee
Leung Fai-Chung	Calvin	Leung Saan Pak employee

=== Miscellaneous ===
Cast	Role	Description
Wong Wai-Tak	Simon	
Heidi Chu	Simon's wife	
Leung Kin-Ping	Hing	Wing's boyfriend Previous life: Ximen Qing
Griselda Yeung	Wing	Nichole's friend

== Soundtrack ==
Theme song: 沒有半分空間 by Wong Hei
Sub-Theme song: In Another Time by Jodie Simmons
