= Black Cat (1991 film) =

1991 Hong Kong film by Stephen Shin

- Directed by: Stephen Shin
- Written by: Lam Wai-lun; Chan Bo-shun; Lam Tan-ping
- Produced by: Stephen Shin
- Starring: Jade Leung; Simon Yam; Thomas Lam
- Cinematography: Lee Kin-keung
- Edited by: Wong Wing-ming
- Music by: Danny Chung
- Production companies: D & B Films Co. Ltd.
- Distributed by: Fortune Star Media Limited
- Release date: 17 August 1991 (Hong Kong)
- Running time: 91 minutes
- Country: Hong Kong
- Languages: Cantonese; English; Japanese
- Box office: HK$ 11,088,210

Black Cat (Chinese: 黑貓; pinyin: Hēi māo) is a 1991 Hong Kong action film directed and produced by Stephen Shin. The film stars Jade Leung as Catherine who accidentally kills a truck driver. After escaping trial, she is captured by medics who insert a "Black Cat" chip into her brain putting her under the complete control of the American CIA. The CIA turns her into a new CIA agent known as Erica.

Director Stephen Shin originally wanted the film to be a straight remake of Luc Besson's film La Femme Nikita but couldn't after Warner Bros. purchased the rights for an American remake, which became John Badham's Point of No Return. Critics compared the film unfavorably to La Femme Nikita. Jade Leung won the award for Best Newcomer at the 11th Hong Kong Film Awards for her role in the film. A sequel titled Black Cat 2: The Assassination of President Yeltsin was released in 1992.

== Plot summary ==
Catherine, a young Chinese drifter working at a New York truck stop, is harassed by a long haul driver, and stabs him with a fork in retaliation, which gets her fired. Waiting for him in the parking lot, she feigns interest in exchanging sex for money, but after he pays her, she hits him with a rock and kicks him into momentary immobility. As she walks away, he recovers and grabs her from behind and hurls her through the truck stop window, and they continue fighting. The restaurant owner calls the cops, and fires a shot into the air to try stopping the fight. Cat picks up a shard of broken glass from the shattered window, charges at the trucker, and stabs the glass shard repeatedly into his torso. In the melee, the trucker knocks out the owner, and Cat obtains the owner's gun, and shoots the trucker, who collapses dead on top of her. After passing out, she is revived by an arriving police officer, and out of reflex, shoots the officer, killing him instantly.

In custody, the police abuse Cat, forcing her to strip search in front of female officers, and one in turn later attacks her in the shower with a billy-club. Cat turns the tables, snatches the billy-club and beats down the female officer. When taken to court, while attempting to use the bathroom, a hitman comes for her. Using a wire from the toilet, she undoes her handcuffs, knocks out the hitman with the lid, steals his gun, and makes a break for freedom. Outside the courthouse, she runs through the streets, and upon turning into an alley, a car pulls out, the driver produces a rifle, takes aim, and fires a tranquilizer shot at her.

Cat is operated on, and a microchip, known as the ‘Black Cat’ is planted in her brain. Then she is spirited away by helicopter to a top secret facility run by the CIA. She awakens in a stark white room, where a man named Brian explains that she has been certified dead, and now has the opportunity to work for the government. He offers her medication for what he says will be frequent headaches caused by her chip implant. Cat grabs Brian’s gun, shoots him, and in her underwear, runs out into the complex looking, once more, for a way out. Brian catches up to her, revealing he was wearing a bullet proof vest.

Over the course of a year, Cat is taught to be an effective and unemotional assassin. After a virtual reality test where she hesitates to kill a target she believes to be an unobtrusive old woman but is in fact a terrorist in disguise, higher-ups want to kill her as being unviable, but Brian asks for another opportunity. He makes Cat believe she is being given a weekend of liberty, but she learns she has been tasked with infiltrating a Jewish wedding and kill the bride. She succeeds, but in the course of fleeing the scene, she finds her getaway car is inoperative, and must improvise another escape through heavy gunfire, ultimately jumping off a bridge and surviving being carried through the rapids. She confronts Brian, who tells her she has passed this test, and can return to society, albeit under their command.

Under the new identity of Erica, she is placed in Hong Kong and poses as a photo journalist for a magazine, in order to get access to several underworld targets whom she is ordered to kill. While on her first mission, she learns she has been photographed, and upon tracking the photographer down, learns his name is Thomas, an employee at a bird sanctuary. Taken with his kind nature, she dates him, never revealing her true occupation, with Brian outwardly seeming to approve of their relationship, so long as it does not interfere with her work.

Soon complications begin to arise. In one instance, after leaving a movie with her boyfriend, she is recognized by a childhood friend now married and pregnant; though she denies being Cat to her former friend, later that evening the woman and her husband are killed in a suspicious explosion, likely arranged by the CIA to maintain her cover.

For the next assignment, she is sent to Japan to assassinate a crime boss at a resort. Trying to balance her two lives, she takes Thomas to Japan with her under the premise of a lovers' holiday. However, she is given the order to kill the boss in the middle of lovemaking. Stealing away as best as possible, she makes the kill in the resort's hot springs, but upon return is confronted by Thomas. While trying to explain her situation, the agency calls to warn them to leave immediately, as a taxi awaits them. Escaping the hotel radius, the driver tells them to flee on foot, but she notices the driver is armed, and subdues him, inferring that he was planning to kill Thomas. As they run away, Cat continuously tries to warn Thomas to leave her, but he insists on staying at her side. She knocks him out, gives him a gun for protection, and steals the taxi, but while passing through a police roadblock, finds he has hitched a ride with a truck driver and followed her. She successfully leaves the roadblock, but the police pull him from the truck, and finding her gun, believe him to be the assassin. She thus follows the squad car carrying him and rams it, shooting the officers, and freeing him.

Driving further away, they are stopped by a CIA helicopter, which Brian and other officers emerge from. Cat initially pleads for Thomas' life, but when it is clear they will not let him live, demands she be the one to kill him. Thomas steps out of the car, and Cat apparently shoots him twice in his left side. He is left for dead, and Cat is taken away by her handlers. However, she has known that due to a birth abnormality, his heart is on his right side, thus he will live.

== Cast ==
- Jade Leung as Erica Leung / Catherine
- Simon Yam as Brian
- Thomas Lam as Thomas
- Curtis Fraser as Prison Guard
- Denise Stauffer as Prison Guard
- Jordy Shane as Disguised Old Woman
- Audrey Rene as Bride
- Mary Rawbins as Hostess
- Randi Lynne as Prison Guard
- Glen Morrison as Gun Instructor
- Kiara Hunter as CIA Agent (as Cara Leigh Hunter)
- Jamie Estio as Groom

== Production ==
Director Stephen Shin originally wanted to make the film a straight remake of Luc Besson's film La Femme Nikita but stopped after rights to a remake in the United States were purchased by Warner Bros. For the role of Catherine, unknown model Jade Leung was cast. Black Cat was filmed on locations in Hong Kong, Japan and Canada.

== Release ==
The film was released in Hong Kong on 17 August 1991. The film grossed a total of HK$11,088,210. The film received a sequel in 1992 titled Black Cat 2: The Assassination of President Yeltsin.

== Reception ==
Jade Leung won the award for best newcomer for her role in Black Cat at the 11th Hong Kong Film Awards. Stephen Holden of The New York Times praised an action scene in the film involving Jade Leung going down a tall building crane to arrange for some steel bars to fall onto a speeding car. Holden went on to critique the love story in the film referring to it as "the movie's weakest element" as Thomas Lam's character "is simply too bland and passive to make a scintillating partner for a dynamo like Catherine." Derek Elley in Variety referred to the film as a "thinly scripted" film and that Leung is "excellent in the bruising opening reels." The Los Angeles Times gave a mixed review referring to the film as "essentially routine, an all-too-obvious kickoff to a series that already has its third installment in production." Allrovi gave the film two stars out of five referring to the film as a "knock off of Luc Besson's La Femme Nikita".

== See also ==
- Hong Kong films of 1991
- List of action films of the 1990s
- List of neo-noir titles

== Notes ==
=== References ===
- * Logan, Bey (1996). Hong Kong Action Cinema. Overlook Press. ISBN 0879516631.
