= A Matter of Customs =

TV programme in Hong Kong

- Promo poster
- 雷霆第一關
- Genre: Action
- Starring: Liza Wang; Danny Lee; Wong Hei; Jessica Hsuan; Raymond Cho; Melissa Ng; Jade Leung; Evergreen Mak; Fiona Yuen; Benz Hui; Felix Lok; Joyce Tang
- Opening theme: "天網" by Eason Chan
- Ending theme: "戀愛是個海" by Wong He
- Country of origin: Hong Kong
- Original language: Cantonese
- No. of episodes: 32

Production
- Producer: Nelson Cheung
- Running time: 45 minutes (approx.)

Original release
- Network: TVB
- Release: September 4 – October 15, 2000

A Matter of Customs (Chinese: 雷霆第一關; Cantonese: Lui Ting Dai Yat Kwan) is a TVB program in Hong Kong starring Liza Wang, Danny Lee, Wong Hei and Jessica Hsuan. The story is about customs officers in Hong Kong.

== Plot ==
The story revolves around a customs team consisting originally of Sek (Evergreen Mak), Queenie (Fiona Leung), Heung (Jade Leung) and two others. Moon (Jessica Hsuan) is transferred to Ming's (Liza Wang) division. Kong (Wong Hei) also joins the team as captain.

Ming suddenly finds herself falling for Shan (Danny Lee), a distinguished man in the publishing industry. At work, she is a role model to her most trusted subordinates Kong and Moon.

Kong and Moon eventually fall in love with each other. But their fiery personalities soon clash and they end up breaking up.

They both move on with different people but both end up in failure.

Ming eventually gets together with Shan, but things get complicated when Shan's ex-girlfriend Kwun returns trying to get back together with him. Ming later finds that Shan involved in illegal drug practices.

== Kong and Moon ==
[Wong Hei and Jessica Hsuan]

Jessica gets transferred to her Aunt in Law's [Liza Wang] division, because she demonstrated her ability to work with suspects. Wong Hei just so happens to be transferred to the same team as the team leader, previously CID. He is a loner, cold to everyone. Jessica tries to help him be more open, She asks him to drive her to work everyday on her motorcycle. He eventually agrees when she buys herself her own helmet. On one her first real operation she chases a criminal down but gets stab with an injection needle of the criminal who has AIDS. Jessica is horrified at the thought of possibility that she too may have contracted it. In front of her family and others she tries to be strong, but when they all leave she breaks down and runs out. Wong Hei chases after her, and he comforts her telling that she is not responsible for her family that she cannot take care of his girlfriend. Over time, Jessica sees that they are completely different people and they cannot be together. She breaks from him; also finding out that her heart has always been with Wong Hei.

Wong Hei during an operation he accidentally shoots Queenie. He is unable to cope with the fact that he had shot and killed another person, his own team member. Yet again Jessica tries to comfort him, but he waters and shoots Jacky in the head, instantly killing her. Wong Hei is grabbing to the side of the boat. They both smile at each other, and Wong Hei lets go and vanishes into the murky waters of the harbor. Jessica frantically searches for him in vain even when they try to bring her up on the boat, but

The series ended with many unanswered questions including if Kong die and what the numbers he gave Shan. So TVB aired the MV of the series subtheme song "To Love Like the Sea" sung by Wong Hei. The MV stars Jessica Hsuan.

The hidden meaning to the numbers 14237348 was revealed in the MV. The numbers are the coordinates to the place that he buried a letter to Jessica.

The letter states:

Moon,

I heard that when you die, each person gets a second to review their whole life, but I got an extra second and that second totally belongs to you. Don't be sad for me, please let me die.

This tells Moon that he was lying before when he said that he didn't love her. But that she was the one in his heart the whole time. It also reveals that it is most likely that he let go of the boat on purpose. Earlier it was said by Wong Hei that he didn't deserve happiness. So he let go, but this is one interpretation of the MV, and many argue otherwise.

At the end of the MV Jessica runs out of the sea screaming NO, and Wong Hei is there in the sea and they hold hands. There are two versions of it, one is a far view of Wong Hei and Jessica side-by-side holding hands in the sea. The other is the close up of the hands; this is significant to the series.

== Cast ==
- Liza Wang as Customs Superintendent Ming Lui Fuk-ming (呂馥明)
- Danny Lee as Tao Ling-shan (涂令山)
- Wong Hei as Customs Inspector Lam Chi Kong (林志剛)
- Jessica Hester Hsuan as Moon Fung Moon-fan (馮滿芬)
- Raymond Cho as Police Inspector Lam Chi-kit (林志傑)
- Melissa Ng as Pao Kei-kwan (鮑紀君)
- Jade Leung as Customs Officer Pao Kei-heung (鮑紀香)
- Evergreen Mak Cheung-ching as Chief Customs Officer Lee Chu-shek (李柱碩)
- Fiona Yuen as Customs Officer Queenie Siu Yuk-kwai (蕭玉桂)
- Benz Hui as Lam Yat-bun (林一斌)
- Felix Lok as Luk Kam-ho (陸錦濠)
- Joyce Tang as Elsa Wan Pui-ling (尹佩玲)
- Shirley Cheung as Kung Siu-yau (恭小柔)

== Awards and nominations ==
=== 2000 TVB Anniversary Awards ===
- Nominated: My Favourite Leading Actor of the Year (Wong He)
- Nominated: My Favourite Television Character (Wong He)
- Nominated: My Favourite Leading Actress of the Year (Jessica Hsuan) - Top 5
- Won: My Favourite Television Character (Jessica Hsuan)

=== 2001 Next TV Awards ===
- Top 10 TV Programs (Ranked #6)

Before: Street Fighters: September 1	TVB Jade Second line series 2000; A Matter of Customs; September 4 - October 13	Next: The Green Hope; October 16 -
Before: None	TVB Jade The Final Episode Special - Sunday at 21:00-23:00; A Matter of Customs; October 15	Next: None
