= Wong He =

- Born: Kwong Ngai-yee (鄺毅怡); 27 July 1967 (age 59); Hong Kong
- Occupations: Actor; singer; presenter
- Years active: 1992–present
- Awards: Astro Wah Lai Toi Drama Awards; My Favourite Shot; 2005 Net DeceptionTVB Anniversary Awards – My Favourite Television Character; 2002 Burning Flame II
- Musical career
- Also known as: Wong Hei
- Origin: Hong Kong
- Genres: Cantopop
- Instrument: Singing
- Label: Avex Trax

Wong He (Chinese: 王喜, born 27 July 1967), sometimes credited as Wong Hei, is a Hong Kong actor, singer, and presenter. He is best known for his firefighter roles in TVB's Burning Flame trilogy. As a former police officer, Wong has acted primarily in law enforcement roles during his career at TVB, which gave rise to rumours that his stage name is based on the Cantonese term "皇氣" (lit. "royal air"), a slang term for the Royal Hong Kong Police. Wong is a practising Buddhist, having converted in 2000.

== Early life and police career ==
Born in Hong Kong as Kwong Ngai-yee (鄺毅怡), Wong He grew up in Lam Tin where he attended SKH Kei Hau Secondary School. He has an elder sister and a younger brother. He served in the Royal Hong Kong Police as an airport officer and a Police Tactical Unit member before entering the entertainment industry.

On 24 July 1989, in a case of attempted murder on police officers, Wong saved three of his colleagues from a burning building on Nathan Road. This incident was remembered as one of the top ten heroic acts within the Hong Kong Police Force in 2010.

== Entertainment career ==
Wong began his entertainment career in 1992 as a radio host for Commercial Radio Hong Kong and later as a host for ATV. It was during his radio days that he picked the stage name "Wong He" for himself, named after a waiter in the novel To Live.

In 1996, Wong joined TVB and starred his first TV series Nothing to Declare. He became popularly known for his role as Yau Chi Dak ("OK Dak") in the successful TVB drama, Food of Love]. In 1997, Wong received his first nomination for Best Actor at the TVB Anniversary Awards for his performance in Deadly Protection. Later that year, Wong starred in TVB comedy A Tough Side of a Lady.

In 1998, Wong scored his breakthrough role when he played a firefighter in the classic hit TVB series Burning Flame. He was nominated as one of the top five finalists for Best Actor at the 1999 TVB Anniversary Awards. Burning Flame made Wong a household name and led to the reprisal of his firefighter role in the 2002 sequel Burning Flame II. Wong won My Favourite Television Character Award for his role as Kei Tak Tin in Burning Flame II at the 2002 TVB Anniversary Awards.

In 2000, Wong launched an "au naturel" pictorial book, "Access Wong He," the proceeds of which were all donated to the relief fund for Taiwan's 1999 Jiji earthquake. Wong has also made a number of film appearances in Hong Kong. He was nominated for Best Supporting Actor at the fifth Golden Bauhinia Awards for The Boss Up There. In addition, he has starred in several TV series in Singapore, Taiwan, and mainland China.

As a popular TVB actor, Wong signed a recording contract with Avex Trax. In 2001, Wong released his debut EP, Xi Xin Chang Ge (喜新唱歌), featuring "Love is the Sea," the ending theme song from A Matter of Customs. With the success of his debut EP, Wong released his debut album I Believe...Wong He in February 2002. In September of the same year, Wong released another album Call Me in the Morning. In addition, he sang the theme songs for several of his TV series, Doomed to Oblivion, Net Deception, Shades of Truth, and Twilight Investigation.

In 2004, Wong played a computer hacker in TVB's Net Deception, which was released overseas in 2004 and in Hong Kong in 2006. He won the My Favourite Shot Award for his role in Net Deception at the 2005 Astro Wah Lai Toi Drama Awards in Malaysia. Later in the same year, Wong starred opposite Chilam Cheung in Shades of Truth.

Wong had lead roles in TVB series C.I.B. Files (2006) and Fathers and Sons (2007). In 2008, he appeared in The Gem of Life.

In 2009, Wong reprised his role as a firefighter in Burning Flame III. In 2010, Wong paired up with Linda Chung in mystery comedy Twilight Investigation and received praises for their performances.

In early 2016, Wong's face was blurred out in a state-run mainland television program (the CCTV adaptation of Korea's Infinite Challenge) following revelations that he had used social media to call attention to a new book that suggested former mainland leader Zhou Enlai might have been gay. Wong had previously generated controversy about saying "you China Telecom" during a visit to the mainland in 2015.

== Personal life ==
Wong was diagnosed with kidney failure in the 2020s. In 2025, he stated that he thinks he was drugged and raped in Taiwan.

== Filmography ==
=== Television ===
Year	Title	Role	Network	Notes
1996	Nothing to Declare	Cheung Hou Fai	TVB	
1996	Food of Love	Yau Chi Dak	TVB	
1997	Deadly Protection	Chan Fu Gwai	TVB	Nominated – TVB Anniversary Award for Best Actor (Top 8)
1997	A Tough Side of a Lady	Ho Ko Sing	TVB	
1998	Burning Flame	Lok Tin Yau	TVB	Nominated – TVB Anniversary Award for Best Actor (Top 5); Nominated – TVB Anniversary Award for My Favourite On-Screen Partners (Dramas) (Top 5)
1999	Side Beat	Chou Sai Fan	TVB	
1999	Sensitive New Age Guy	Zhao Zheng Nan	Singapore MediaCorp	
2000	A Matter of Customs	Lam Chi Kong	TVB	Nominated – TVB Anniversary Award for Best Actor; Nominated – TVB Anniversary Award for My Favourite Television Character; Nominated – TVB Anniversary Award for My Favourite On-Screen Partners (Dramas) with Jessica Hsuan
2001	A Step into the Past	Drummer (cameo)	TVB	(Episode 6)
2001	Jiao Feng	Xu Jiang Hai	Mainland China	
2002	Burning Flame II	Kei Tak Tin (Peter)	TVB	Won – TVB Anniversary Award for My Favourite Television Character; Nominated – TVB Anniversary Award for Best Actor; Nominated – TVB Anniversary Award for My Favourite On-Screen Partners (Dramas) with Maggie Cheung Ho-Yee
2002	Doomed to Oblivion	Cheng Ban Kiu	TVB	
2002	Wind and Cloud	Chun Seung (Frost)	Taiwan CTV	
2003	Romancing Hong Kong	Yu Zhen Bang	Mainland China	
2004	Net Deception	Yiu Sing Tin (Eros)	TVB	Won – Astro Wah Lai Toi Drama Awards for My Favourite Shot
2004	Shades of Truth	Lam Chi-Chung (TC)	TVB	Nominated – TVB Anniversary Award for Best Actor
2005	Beauty Girls	Zhuang Jia Ying	Mainland China	
2006	Powder Leads a Race	Chen Hao	Mainland China	
2006	C.I.B. Files	Chung Jing (Mark)	TVB	Nominated – TVB Award for Best Actor (Top 20); Nominated – TVB Award for My Favourite Male Character (Top 20)
2007–2008	Best Selling Secrets	Ng Gung-Gan (Kilo)	TVB	
2007	Fathers and Sons	Ko Ching	TVB	Nominated – TVB Award for Best Actor (Top 20); Nominated – TVB Award for My Favourite Male Character (Top 24)
2008–2009	The Gem of Life	Shek Tai Wor	TVB	
2009	Burning Flame III	Chung Yau Sing	TVB	Nominated – TVB Award for Best Actor (Top 15); Nominated – TVB Award for My Favourite Male Character (Top 15)
2010	Some Day	Gau Man-fu	TVB	
2010	Twilight Investigation	Kei On-kui (Encore)	TVB	
2015	Elite Brigade III		RTHK	Airing on 3 October 2015

=== Film ===
Year	Title	Role	Notes
1994	Touches of Love		
1995	Mack the Knife	Tiger	aka Dr. Mack
1995	Passion 1995	Lung	
1995	Husbands and Wives		
1996	The Killer Has No Return	Dung Jan Wa	
1996	Stooge, My Love	Biscuit	
1997	Mad Stylist	Dee	
1997	Love is Not a Game, But a Joke	DJ of Sex Chatline	
1999	The Accident	Wong Man-Lok	
1999	The Boss Up There	Dog	
2000	Legend of 2 Dragons		
2000	Sworn Revenge	Ching Fai	
2000	Undercover Blues	Charles	
2001	The Bird of Prey	To Ping	TV-movie (TVB)
2001	Zhan You		
2002	Twilight Zone Cops: Models Angel	Chiu Zhong Han	
2002	Love in Garden Street	Ronald	
2002	Memento	Officer Chow	
2003	The Final Shot	Fai	TV-movie (TVB)
2003	Sai Kung Story	Ming	
2003	The Story of Soccer Bet		aka Football Gambling
2003	The Dark Side of My Mind	Kent	
2004	My Baby Shot Me Down	Wong Wai Tim	
2004	Men in a Blue Mood	Pat	aka Men in the Blue Mood
2010	Close to You		
2010	Color Me Love		
2012	Laugh and Cry Forbidden		
2012	Love 789		

== Discography ==
=== Albums ===
- 2001 Xi Xin Chang Ge (喜新唱歌) (EP)
- 2002 I Believe...Wong Hei
- 2002 Call Me in the Morning

=== Television theme songs ===
- 2000 '"Love is the Sea" (戀愛是個海) A Matter of Customs ending theme song
- 2002 "Hardly Confused" (難得糊塗) Doomed to Oblivion opening theme song
- 2002 "Scanty with Words" (沉默寡言) Doomed to Oblivion ending theme song
- 2004 "Gray Terror" (灰色恐怖) Net Deception opening theme song
- 2004 "Worth" (價值) Net Deception ending theme song
- 2004 "No Half Space" (沒有半分空間) Shades of Truth theme song
- 2010 "Mind Eater" (食腦) Twilight Investigation theme song

== Awards and nominations ==
- 1997: Next TV Awards- Most Promising New Actor
- 1997: Next TV Awards- Top 10 Artists (Ranked #9)
- 1997: TVB Anniversary Awards- Nominated Best Performance by an Actor in a Drama for Deadly Protection
- 1998: Next TV Awards- Top 10 Artists (Ranked #10)
- 1999: TVB Anniversary Awards- Nominated My Favourite Leading Actor of the Year for Burning Flame
- 1999: TVB Anniversary Awards- Nominated My Favourite On-Screen Partners (Dramas) for Burning Flame
- 2000: Golden Bauhinia Awards- Nominated Best Supporting Actor for The Boss Up There
- 2000: TVB Anniversary Awards- Nominated My Favourite Leading Actor of the Year for A Matter of Customs
- 2000: TVB Anniversary Awards- Nominated My Favourite Television Character for A Matter of Customs
- 2000: TVB Anniversary Awards- Nominated My Favourite On-Screen Partners (Dramas) for A Matter of Customs
- 2001: Next TV Awards- Top 10 Artists (Ranked #8)
- 2002: TVB Anniversary Awards- My Favourite Television Character for Burning Flame II
- 2002: TVB Anniversary Awards- Nominated My Favourite Leading Actor of the Year for Burning Flame II
- 2002: TVB Anniversary Awards- Nominated My Favourite On-Screen Partners (Dramas) for Burning Flame II
- 2003: Hong Kong 3 Weekly Magazine Popularity Awards- Popular Male Artist Award
- 2005: Malaysia Astro Wah Lai Toi Drama Awards- My Favourite Shot for Net Deception
- 2005: TVB Anniversary Awards- Nominated Best Actor in a Leading Role for Shades of Truth
- 2006: TVB Anniversary Awards- Nominated Best Actor for C.I.B. Files
- 2006: TVB Anniversary Awards- Nominated My Favourite Male Character for C.I.B. Files
- 2007: TVB Anniversary Awards- Nominated Best Actor for Fathers and Sons
- 2007: TVB Anniversary Awards- Nominated My Favourite Male Character for Fathers and Sons
- 2009: Hong Kong Next Magazine Awards- Top 10 Healthy Artists
- 2009: Singapore i-Weekly Magazine Awards- Top 10 Most Loved Hong Kong Actors (Ranked #8)
- 2009: TVB Anniversary Awards- Nominated Best Actor for Burning Flame III
- 2009: TVB Anniversary Awards- Nominated My Favourite Male Character for Burning Flame III
- 2009: TVB Anniversary Awards- Nominated TVB.com Popular Artist
