= Burning Flame III =

- Official poster
- 烈火雄心3
- Genre: Modern Action
- Created by: Amy Wong
- Starring: Wong Hei; Kevin Cheng; Bosco Wong; Myolie Wu; Aimee Chan; Elaine Yiu; Ruco Chan
- Ending theme: "有意" by Kevin Cheng & Myolie Wu
- Country of origin: Hong Kong
- Original language: Cantonese
- No. of episodes: 32

Production
- Producer: Amy Wong
- Running time: 45 minutes (approx.)

Original release
- Network: TVB
- Release: July 5 – August 15, 2009

Related
- Burning Flame (1998); Burning Flame II (2002)

Burning Flame III (Chinese Traditional: 烈火雄心3) is a TVB production.

It is an independent installment to 1998's Burning Flame and 2002's Burning Flame II.

== Pre-release ==
=== Development ===
Burning Flame III will have a new storyline and will not continue where its predecessor left off. The main theme is still on firefighters' duties and challenges. Wong Hei will continue his legacy as a firefighter alongside the other main casts Kevin Cheng, Bosco Wong and Myolie Wu.

=== Character relations ===
Besides focusing on firefighters' duties, Burning Flame III also shed light on father and son relationship between Wong Hei and his onscreen father Kong Hon. Moreover, there are also romantic plots including a budding love triangle between Wong Hei and his onscreen best friend colleague Kevin Cheng for female lead Myolie Wu. At the same time Kevin Cheng is also being pursued by Leanne Li. Bosco Wong will have love line with Aimee Chan and Stephen Wong will be romantically involved with Elaine Yiu.

== Cast ==
=== Chung Family ===
Cast	Role	Description
Kong Hon (江漢)	Chung Yiu Kan 鍾耀根	Chung Yau-Sing's father
Wong Hei	Cow; Chung Yau-Sing 鍾有成	Station Officer; Best friend of Cheuk Pak-Yu; Ko Wai-Ying's ex-boyfriend June's boyfriend
Yee Chi Yuen (易智遠)	Chung Yau Fu (Fei Jai Fu) 鍾有富 (肥仔富)	Chung Yau-Sing's younger brother

=== Cheuk Family ===
Cast	Role	Description
Angelina Lo (盧宛茵)	Poon Yuk-Hung 潘玉紅	Cheuk Pak-Yu and Cheuk Man's mother
Kevin Cheng	Rex; Cheuk Pak-Yu 卓柏宇	Senior Station Officer; Best friend of Chung Yau-Sing; Ko Wai-Ying's boyfriend
Elaine Yiu	Cheuk Man 卓敏	Sister of Cheuk Pak-Yu

=== Ko Family ===
Cast	Role	Description
Lee Sing Cheung (李成昌)	Ko Hau Tak 高厚德	Ko Wai-Ying and Ko Ho-Nam's father
Helen Ma (馬海倫)	Lee Mei Lan 李美蘭	Ko Wai-Ying and Ko Ho-Nam's mother
Myolie Wu	Ko Wai-Ying 高惠盈	Fire Department Clerk; Cheuk Pak-Yu's girlfriend Ko Ho-Nam's older sister Chung Yau Sing's ex-girlfriend
Stephen Wong	Ko Ho-Nam 高浩南	Senior Ambulanceman; Ko Wai-Ying's younger brother
Joey Mak (麥皓兒)	Ko Yan-Ying 高惠詩	Ko Wai-Ying and Ko Ho-Nam's sister

=== Fong Family ===
Cast	Role	Description
Chow Chung (周驄)	Shum Yat 沈逸 (Sunday)	Fong Lei-On's grandfather
Rebecca Chan	Shum Yuet Wah 沈月華 (Queenie)	Fong Lei-On's mother
Bosco Wong	Encore; Fong Lei-On 方履安	Fireman; Yung Siu-Yee's boyfriend then husband
Aimee Chan	Easy; Yung Siu-Yee 容少意	Policewoman later on CID; Fong Lei-On's girlfriend then wife

=== Other cast ===
Cast	Role	Description
Matthew Ko	Chan Lok Sun 陳樂生 (Billy, 大B)	Fireman
Eddie Li	Cheung Chi Ho 張志豪 (小B)	Fireman
Sam Chan	Law Hak-Ming 羅克明	Fireman
Leanne Li	Poon Hoi Lam 潘凱琳	Ko wai-ying's best friend
Rachel Kan (簡慕華)	Ho Yee Ching 何懿徵 (June)	Chung Yau-Sing's nurse Chung Yau-Sing's girlfriend
Ruco Chan (陳展鵬)	Pang Chi Bun 彭志斌 (Kelvin)	Cheuk Pak-Yu's superior and Fire Services Divisional Officer

== Awards and nominations ==
TVB Anniversary Awards (2009)

- Best Drama
- Best Actor (Kevin Cheng)
- Best Actor (Bosco Wong)
- Best Actor (Wong He)
- Best Actress (Myolie Wu)
- Best Supporting Actress (Aimee Chan)
- My Favourite Male Character (Wong He)
- Most Improved Actress (Aimee Chan)

== Viewership ratings ==
	Week	Episodes	Average Points	Peaking Points	References
1	July 6–10, 2009	1 — 5	33	37	
2	July 13–17, 2009	6 — 10	34	36	
3	July 20–24, 2009	11 — 15	32	40	
4	July 27–31, 2009	16 — 20	32	35	
5	August 3–7, 2009	21 — 25	34	38	
6	August 10–14, 2009	26 — 30	34	—	
6	August 15, 2009	31 — 32	31	38	
