= The Gem of Life =

2007 Hong Kong television drama series

- Official Poster
- 珠光寶氣
- Genre: Modern Drama
- Starring: Gigi Lai; Ada Choi; Maggie Shiu; Bowie Lam; Moses Chan; Bosco Wong; Linda Chung; Wong Hei; Louise Lee; Eddie Kwan; Kenny Wong; Elliot Ngok; David Chiang; Chan Hung Lit
- Opening theme: "鑽禧" by Shirley Kwan
- Ending theme: "無情有愛" by Linda Chung "相戀兩個字" by Bowie Lam & Gigi Lai "我還在等甚麼" by Moses Chan
- Country of origin: Hong Kong
- Original language: Cantonese
- No. of episodes: 82

Production
- Producer: Jonathan Chik
- Production locations: Hong Kong; Macau; France; Thailand; Tibet; Beijing, China; Shanghai, China; Qingdao, China; Shenzhen, China; Dongguan, China; Zhuhai, China
- Running time: 45 minutes (approx.)
- Production company: Television Broadcasts Limited

Original release
- Network: TVB Jade
- Release: October 20, 2008 – February 13, 2009

The Gem of Life
- Traditional Chinese: 珠光寶氣
- Simplified Chinese: 珠光宝气
Transcriptions

The Gem of Life (Traditional Chinese: 珠光寶氣) is a TVB grand production drama, that broadcast between October 2008 and February 2009. The series was specifically filmed to celebrate TVB's 41st Anniversary. Filming took place in many locations apart from Hong Kong, including Tibet, Taiwan, and France.

== Premise ==
The story centers around three sisters: Sylvia (oldest), Constance, and Jessica (youngest). Each of them faces a failing marriage and the subsequent loss of their comfortable lifestyle. The sisters and their mother, Siu Yau, plot various schemes to recover their family honor and fortune.

== Cast ==
=== The Hong family ===
Cast	Role	Description
David Chiang	Hong Ching-Yeung 康青楊	Owner, Cheok Mei Jewelry. Hong Bak Siu-Yau's husband. Sylvia, Constance, and Jessica Hong's father.
Louise Lee	Hong Bak Siu-Yau 康白筱柔	Affectionately called "Xiao Jia" (Shanghainese for "miss" or "madam"). Hong Ching-Yeung's wife. Sylvia, Constance, and Jessica Hong's mother.
Maggie Shiu	Sylvia Hong 康雅言	Affectionately called "Du Mei" (Shanghainese for "big sister"). Entertainment company manager. Constance and Jessica Hong's elder sister. Bok Mao's (博貿) CEO; Tim Yip's ex-wife. Sunny Yau's close friend.
Gigi Lai	Constance Hong 康雅瞳	Affectionately called "Yi Mei" (Shanghainese for "second sister"). Joint partner with Terrence and Jessica at Ego-Sky Enterprises & Miracle Holdings after Martin's death. Manager at Cheuk Mei Jewelry. Sylvia and Jessica Hong's sister. Terrence Ho's ex-wife. Derek's ex-girlfriend Frankie Fan's ex-wife
Ada Choi	Jessica Hong 康雅思	Affectionately called "Xiao Mei" (Shanghainese for "youngest sister"). Joint partner with Constance and Terrence at Ego-Sky Enterprises & Miracle Holdings after her husband Martin's death. Sylvia and Constance Hong's younger sister. Martin Ho's widow. Patrick Yeung's ex-wife.

=== The Ho family ===
Cast	Role	Description
Elliot Ngok	Martin Ho 賀峰	Wealthy tycoon. Chairman of Ego-Sky Enterprises & Miracle Holdings. Terrence Ho and Ho Zit-Seon's father. Jessica Hong's late husband.
Moses Chan	Terrence Ho 賀哲男	CEO of Miracle Holdings. Constance Hong's ex-husband. Joint partner with Constance and Jessica at Ego-Sky Enterprises & Miracle Holdings after his father's death.
	Ho Zit-Seon 賀哲迅	Ho Fung & Jessica Hong's Son; Terrence Ho's half brother. Died after kidnapped by Phillip Song.

=== The Shek family ===
Cast	Role	Description
Wong Hei	Shek Tai-Wor 石泰禾	Jewelry company factory assistant manager. William Shek's older brother. Jessica Hong's secret admirer.
Bosco Wong	William Shek 石泰川	Businessman; Inherited Melissa Yan's business empire - the Melissa Li Group. Melissa Yan's protege before her death. Shek Tai-Wor's younger brother. Elise Sung's secret admirer.

=== The Sung family ===
Cast	Role	Description
Chan Hung Lit	Philip Sung 宋世萬	Wealthy Business Tycoon; Chairman of Wrestle Holdings. Elise Sung's grandfather. James Sung's older brother.
Helen Ma (馬海倫)	Margaret Sung-Kwok 宋郭婉儀	Philip Sung's first wife. Terrence Ho's godmother.
Queenie Chu	Man Wai (Mandy) 文慧	Philip Sung's ex-mistress.
Queena Chan (陳丹丹)	Charlie Cheuk Yi 卓凝	Philip Sung's fourth mistress. Martin Ho's mole in Sung Sai-Man's organization
Linda Chung	Elise Sung 宋子凌	William Shek's right hand person. Philip Sung's granddaughter. Philip Sung's mole in Melissa Li Group, after William Shek inherited it. Admires Terrance Ho and is the cause of his and Constance's divorce. Later, admires William.
Yu Yang	James Sung 宋世基	Philip Sung's younger brother.
Cindy Lee	Kate Sung 宋佩嘉	James Sung's daughter. Elise Sung's good friend.

=== The Ko family ===
Cast	Role	Description
Lai Suen (黎宣)		Ko Cheung-Shing's mother.
Bowie Lam	Calvin Ko 高長勝	Bok Shing Corporation's CEO; Sylvia Hong's ex-boyfriend, reconciled later. Sunny Yau's friend and partner. Shum Tsi-Tang's ex-husband.

=== Other cast ===
Cast	Role	Description
Eddie Kwan (關禮傑)	Derek Chan 陳啟發	Admirer of Constance Hong.
Kenny Wong (黃德斌)	Sunny Yau 游日東	Calvin Ko's friend/business partner/admirer. Sylvia Hong's friend. Revealed to be a homosexual.
Rebecca Chan	Melissa Yan 虞葦庭	Businesswoman head of Melissa Li Group; Former ally of Martin Ho.
Lau Dan	Ryan Suen Wai-Tak 孫懷德	Chairman of Kei Lei Jewelry.
Florence Kwok	Catherine Shum 沈之澄	Chairwoman of L'ete Holdings. Calvin Ko's ex-wife.
Carrie Lam	Stephy	Model
Ram Chiang (蔣志光)	Patrick Yeung 楊志球	Businessman. Jessica Hong's ex-husband.
Patrick Dunn	Tim Yip 葉富添	Commercial airline pilot. Sylvia Hong's ex-husband.
Mat Yeung (揚明)	Oscar	Artist. Sylvia Hong's entertainment company artist Friend to Kate and Elise Sung.
Rocky Cheng (鄭健樂)	Frankie Fan 范禮奇	Constance Hong's ex-husband.
Angelina Lo (盧宛茵)	Mrs. Ho 何太	Hong Bak Siu-Yau's friend.

== Awards and nominations ==
=== TVB Anniversary Awards (2009) ===
- Best Drama
- Best Actor (Bowie Lam)
- Best Actress (Maggie Shiu)
- Best Actress (Gigi Lai)
- Best Actress (Ada Choi) - Top 5
- Best Supporting Actor (Elliot Ngok) - Top 5
- Best Supporting Actor (Kenny Wong)
- Best Supporting Actress (Linda Chung) - Top 5
- My Favourite Male Character (Moses Chan) - Top 5
- My Favourite Male Character (Bowie Lam)
- My Favourite Male Character (Kenny Wong)
- My Favourite Female Character (Maggie Shiu)
- My Favourite Female Character (Ada Choi)
- Most Improved Actress (Queenie Chu) - Top 5
- Most Improved Actress (Catherine Chau) - Top 5

=== 15th Shanghai Television Festival ===
- Best Actress: Ada Choi

== Viewership ratings ==
	Week	Episode	Average Points	Peaking Points	References
1	October 20, 2008	1 — 2	32	37	
1	October 21–23, 2008	3 — 5	31	36	
2	October 27–31, 2008	6 — 10	28	30	
3	November 3–7, 2008	11 — 15	29	—	
4	November 10–14, 2008	16 — 20	29	—	
5	November 17–21, 2008	21 — 24	28	—	
6	November 24–28, 2008	25 — 29	28	—	
7	December 1–5, 2008	30 — 33	28	—	
8	December 8–12, 2008	34 — 38	28	31	
9	December 15–19, 2008	39 — 43	25	—	
10	December 22–26, 2008	44 — 48	25	—	
11	December 29, 2008 - January 2, 2009	49 — 53	28	30	
12	January 5–9, 2009	54 — 58	27	—	
13	January 12–16, 2009	59 — 63	27	—	
14	January 19–22, 2009	64 — 67	27	—	
14	January 23, 2009	68 — 69	28	29	
15	January 28–30, 2009	70 — 72	25	—	
16	February 2–6, 2009	73 — 77	30	33	
17	February 9–13, 2009	78 — 82	29	35	
