= Burning Flame =

- Promo poster
- 烈火雄心
- Genre: Modern, Action
- Created by: Amy Wong
- Starring: Louis Koo; Wong Hei; Esther Kwan; Waise Lee; Jade Leung; Chin Ka Lok; Joe Cheng; Joe Ma
- Opening theme: 火焰心 by Andy Lau
- Ending theme: 無出息的漢子 by Andy Lau
- Country of origin: Hong Kong
- Original language: Cantonese
- No. of episodes: 43

Production
- Producer: Amy Wong
- Running time: 45 minutes (approx.)

Original release
- Network: TVB
- Release: 12 October – 6 December 1998

Related
- Burning Flame II (2002); Burning Flame III (2009)

Burning Flame (Chinese: 烈火雄心) is a TVB modern action drama that focuses on the duties and challenges of Hong Kong firefighters. It is the first installment in the Burning Flame series. The series was specifically filmed to celebrate TVB's 31st Anniversary and was supported by Hong Kong Fire Services Department.

== Synopsis ==
Lok Tin Yau (Wong Hei) has dreamed of becoming a firefighter since he was young, because he was saved by a brave firefighter once. His mother initially did not allow him to be a firefighter for fear of his safety. However, Yau managed to convince her otherwise. His childhood friends, Ng Dai Heng (Chin Ka Lok) and Sze Tou Bat (Joe Tay) joined the Pat Heung Academy with Yau, too. Lau Hoi Pak (Louis Koo) is the son of a rich man, but he is forced to become a firefighter after his father refused to give him any more money. Pak then leaves his home with his autistic brother, Bou Bou, and goes to Pat Heung as well. Sum Pik Yiu (Esther Kwan) is a working lady with a steady boyfriend of 8 years. But her life is not trouble-free: she loses her job, her family is in debt, and she discovers her boyfriend cheating on her. In order to start anew, she joins Pat Heung to become a firefighter.

In the academy, they all have to undergo grueling training in order to be qualified firefighters. There, the trainees forge a strong bond and teamwork is an essential quality found in all firefighters. Even the cool, anti-social Pak warms up to Yau, Dai Heng and the others over time. Upon graduating, Yau, Dai Heng and But are sent to Chi Wan San Station, whereas Pak is sent to Cheung Chau. At Chi Wan San, the three boys meet Fung (Lei Zi Hong). Yau initially dislikes Fung's laid-back attitude, but soon realizes that he has a lot to learn from Fung. As the relationships between the characters begin to form, their lives become more and more complicated, as Yau finds out that his father is Fung's father.

== Cast ==
- Louis Koo as Lau Hoi Pak (劉海柏)
- Wong Hei as Lok Tin Yau (駱天佑)
- Esther Kwan as Shum Pik Yiu (沈碧瑤)
- Jade Leung as Lok Hiu Chui (駱曉翠)
- Waise Lee as Lok Hiu Fung (駱曉峰)
- Chin Ka Lok as Ng Tai Hing (吳大興)
- Joe Tay as Szeto Bat (司徒拔)
- Johnny Tang as Woo Kong Kei (胡港基)
- Danny Summer as Ho Sing (何星)
- Paul Chun as Lok Shun (駱信)
- Law Koon Lan as Kwok Lai Kwan (郭麗群)
- Timothy Cheng as Marco Lau Hoi Yat (劉海逸)
- Joe Ma as Wong Chun Fat (王駿發)
- Lee San San as Tang Cheng Yuet (滕井悅)

== Awards and nominations ==
=== 1999 TVB Anniversary Awards ===
- Nominated: My Favourite Leading Actor of the Year (Wong He) - Top 5
- Nominated: My Favourite Leading Actress of the Year (Esther Kwan) - Top 5

=== 1999 Asian Television Awards ===
- Won: Best Drama Series

=== 1999 Next TV Awards ===
- Top 10 TV Programs (Ranked #4)

=== 1998 TV Programme Appreciation Index Survey ===
- Top 20 Most Appreciated Television Programs of the Year (Ranked #7)
