= Doomed to Oblivion =

- Poster
- 鄭板橋
- Genre: Costume drama
- Starring: Wong Hei; Gigi Lai; Adia Chan; Myolie Wu
- Opening theme: "Nande hutu" performed by Wong He 難得糊塗
- Ending theme: "Taciturn" performed by Wong He 沉默寡言
- Country of origin: Hong Kong
- Original language: Cantonese
- No. of episodes: 25 Hong Kong; 30 overseas

Production
- Running time: 45 minutes (approx.)

Original release
- Network: TVB
- Release: 5 January – 24 January 2007

Doomed to Oblivion is a 2002 costume drama produced by Hong Kong's TVB, it takes its Chinese name, Zheng Banqiao (Chinese: 鄭板橋), from the name of the protagonist of the series. It was also known as Nande hutu (Chinese: 難得糊塗 roughly lucky to be blessed with foolishness) a motto of the Qing dynasty painter that the series is a fictionalised account of.

The series was aired overseas by TVB affiliates in 2002, however in Hong Kong itself it was warehoused until March 2005, when it was aired by TVB's subscription drama channel; in May 2007 it aired on TVB's main free to view channel in a graveyard slot, Tuesdays to Saturdays 03:15- 05:00 in the morning. The series was aired in Taiwan in 2006, by TVB subsidiary TVBS Entertainment Channel, breaking viewership records for the 8.00 p.m. time slot.

== Plot summary ==
Late in the sixty-year-long reign of the Kangxi Emperor, Zheng Ban Kiu is a young artist hoping to become famous in the city of Yangzhou. Supporting himself through the sale of his paintings, Zheng eventually fell in love with Wong Yut Che, a girl from a wealthy family. Wong's mother didn't want her daughter married to a peasant, so she broke them apart. At the time, Kangxi Emperor was visiting the city incognito and discovers Zheng's potential as an artist. Seeing Zheng as an honest and trustworthy person, the two became friends, and Zheng was promised a position as an official in the capital city. The likelihood of Zheng to suddenly burst into fame put Zheng in good terms with Wong's mother

Zheng also worked together with Kangxi Emperor on a piece of art, which the Emperor later used to hint at his desired successor to the throne. However, the Emperor died before he could fulfill his promise to Zheng. Hearing about the Emperor's passing, Wong's mother realized that Zheng's dreams to a bright future was gone, so she substituted her adopted daughter, Chui Chun Heung as the bride. Wong on the other hand, was married to another high-ranking official. Zheng was furious to learn that he had been cheated, but Wong's mother insisted that she had kept her word in marrying off her "daughter". Although Chui was devoted in her love to him, Zheng loathed Chui for conspiring with her Madam to rob him of his first love. Over time, Zheng softened towards Chui and their relationship improved.

Wong re-enters Zheng's life soon later, asking him to forge a copy of a damaged scroll for her. The artwork in the scroll turned out to be the one Zheng had drawn together with Kangxi Emperor, and in recreating it, Zheng discovered the secret to the Imperial succession. Fearing the safety of everyone involved, Zheng kept the secret to himself. However, Wong's mother became fearful and impatient, she stole the duplicate scroll from Zheng and sets in place the downfall of her family. Blaming Zheng for this, Wong seeks revenge.

Years later, Zheng wrote a poem criticizing the corrupt officials and became a wanted man. In an attempt to save Zheng from the local police, Chui was badly injured. At the time, the Emperor in charge was Qianlong, he was impressed with Zheng and gave him a place as a high-ranking official, but Zheng refused in favour of being a local magistrate and leading a simpler life. However, Chui's injuries were getting worse and she knew her days were numbered. Knowing her husband is prone to despair and that, without her by his side, Zheng will allow himself to waste away, Chui forces Zheng to marry her protege Yiu Ng-mui. On her death bed, Chui recalled seeing Wong again. She feared Wong would seek revenge and asked Yiu to protect Zheng from her.

Two years later, Zheng is a local magistrate. Yiu Ng-mui has taken the place of Chui, and devotes herself to caring for Zheng, earning a reputation as a good and dutiful wife. Zheng however has convinced himself that in losing Chui, he has lost the one true love of his life, and is cold and indifferent to Yiu. At this time, Qianlong Emperor had a task for Zheng, and Zheng was given a rise in ranks. Wong took opportunity of that and framed Zheng of trying to rebel against the Emperor, Zheng was arrested. Yiu tried everything she can to save Zheng, and eventually managed to let Wong learn the truth about her mother's actions. Wong later regrets framing Zheng and admits to her crimes. Having received her punishment, Wong exits Zheng's life once and for all.

Zheng returns home to find that Yiu has left the house. Yiu can no longer bring herself to continue living with the man that she loves, but who does not love her in return. With her promise to Chui fulfilled, Yiu acquiesces to the divorce that Zheng has wanted for many years. However, on finding Yiu gone, Zheng realizes that he has made the same mistake twice, but that with Yiu he has a chance to correct it, and he runs after her.

== Cast ==
The following uses Cantonese romanisations

=== Main cast ===
Actor	Role	Notes
Wong Hei	Zheng Ban Kiu (鄭板橋)	At first an impoverished scholar selling his paintings to make ends meet, confidante of the Kangxi Emperor, later a magistrate and famous painter.
Gigi Lai	Wong Yut Che (王一姐)	Daughter of court official whose family have fallen on hard times following the death of her father. Her mother hopes to restore the family fortune by arranging a favourable marriage. Zheng's first love.
Adia Chan	Chui Chun Heung (徐春香)	Hand maiden and bodyguard of Wong Yut Che, raised by the Wong family, she marries Zheng in place of Wang Yijie out of gratitude to the Wang family. Zheng's first wife.
Myolie Wu	Yiu Ng-mui (饒五妹)	Originally a petty criminal and fraudster, saved and befriended by Chun Heung. She agrees to marry, care for and protect Zheng out of gratitude to Chui. Zheng's second wife.

=== Other cast ===
Actor	Role	Notes
Paul Chun	Kangxi	
Raymond Cho	Qianlong	
Mok Ka Yiu	Jin Nong	
Mark Kwok	Chow Si Jun (周士俊)	
Gilbert Lam		
