= Life Art =

- Promo poster
- 寫意人生
- Genre: Modern Drama
- Starring: Kevin Cheng; Gigi Lai; Paul Chun
- Opening theme: "活得寫意" by Kevin Cheng
- Country of origin: Hong Kong
- Original language: Cantonese
- No. of episodes: 20

Production
- Running time: 45 minutes (approx.)

Original release
- Network: TVB
- Release: March 12 – April 8, 2007

Life Art (Traditional Chinese: 寫意人生) is a TVB modern drama series broadcast in March 2007.

== Synopsis ==
Youthful, talented, and handsome IT Software Manager Fong Chi-Chung (Kevin Cheng) by chance becomes acquainted with the talented, intelligent, and elegant writer and illustrator for children’s books, Yam Tsi-Wah (Gigi Lai). He later learns that Tsi-Wah is the beloved daughter of his own calligraphy and painting teacher, Yam Ching-Chuen (Paul Chun). Furthermore, Chi-Chung discovers that father and daughter are distant.

Chi-Chung continues to have ups and downs in fame and fortune. With love as well, he encounters frustration and defeat. Something that is against anyone’s wishes happens to Ching-Chuen, which causes the relationship among Chi-Chung, Tsi-Wah, and Ching-Chuen to make a new progression.

== Cast ==
Cast	Role	Description
Kevin Cheng	Fong Chi-Chung 方子聰	Technos IT Technician; Yam Tsi-Wah's boyfriend.
Gigi Lai	Yam Tsi-Wah 任芝華	Comic Book Writer; Fong Chi-Chung's girlfriend.
Paul Chun	Yam Ching-Chuen 任清泉	Yam Tsi-Wah's father.
Natalie Tong	Fong Chi-Man 方子敏	Fong Chi-Chung's younger sister.
Mak Cheung-ching (麥長青)	Ko Dai-Wai 高大威	Liu Siu-Bing's husband. Yam Ching-Chuen's brother-in-law. Yam Tsi-Wah's uncle.
Yvonne Lam (林漪娸)	Liu Siu-Bing 廖小冰	Art Shop Owner; Ko Dai-Wai's ex-wife.
Ben Wong	Chuen Ying-Wai 全英偉	Technos Clerk
Astrid Chan (陳芷菁)	Kong Fung 江風	Technos Manager
Queenie Chu	Janice	Fong Chi-Chung's ex-girlfriend.
莫凯谦	Kenny 仔	Yam Tsi-Wah's cousin's son

== Viewership ratings ==
	Week	Episode	Average Points	Peaking Points	References
1	March 12–16, 2007	1 — 5	27	28	
2	March 19–23, 2007	6 — 10	26	—	
3	March 26–30, 2007	11 — 15	27	—	
4	April 2–6, 2007	16 — 19	27	—	
4	April 8, 2007	20	27	—	

== Awards and nominations ==
40th TVB Anniversary Awards (2007)

- "Best Drama"
- "Best Actor in a Supporting Role" (Makbau Mak - Ko Dai-Wai)
