= Jade Leung =

Hong Kong actress (born 1969)

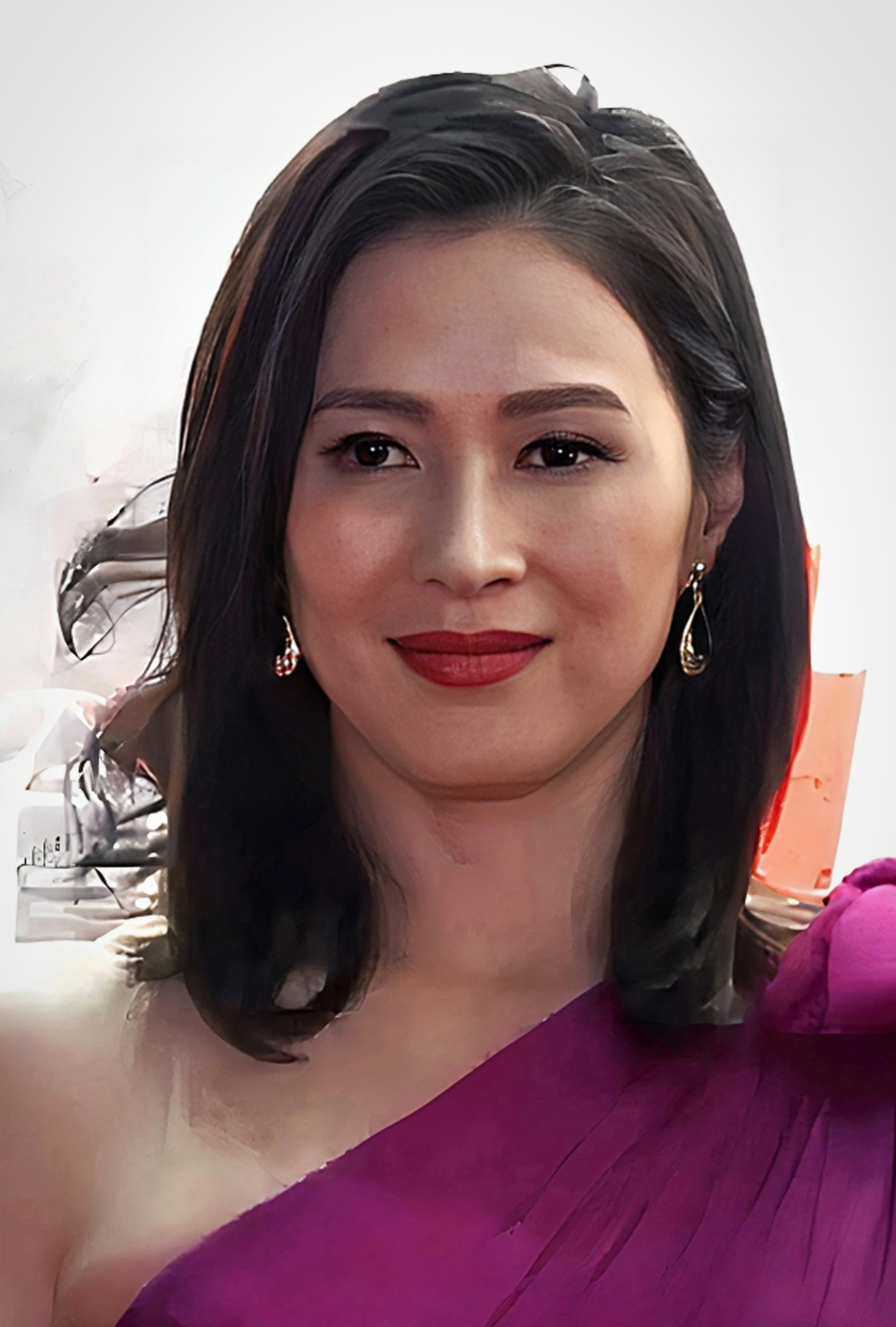
- Leung in 2019
- Born: 梁玉燕 (Leung Yuk-yin); 23 November 1969 (age 56); Hong Kong
- Occupation: Actress
- Years active: 1991–present
- Awards: Hong Kong Film Awards – Best New Performer; 1992 Black Cat (1991 film)

Jade Leung (Chinese: 梁琤; Jyutping: loeng4 zang1), born 23 November 1969 in Hong Kong as Leung Yuk-yin (梁玉燕) is a Hong Kong actress known for starring in kung fu and action films.

She received the 1992 Best New Performer Award at the 11th Hong Kong Film Awards for her role in the 1991 film Black Cat.

In 2005, she starred as Phoenix in Kung Fu Mahjong (2005).

In 2016, she starred in the movies Special Female Force (2016), and Line Walker (2016).

== Filmography ==
The following is a filmography of Jade Leung's work.

=== Film ===
- Black Cat (1991) - Erica Leung/Catherine
- Black Cat 2 (1992) - Catherine
- Satin Steel (1994) - Jade Leung
- Spider Woman (1995) - Kenny/Ken
- Green Hat (1995) - Pearl/Joyce
- Fox Hunter (1995) - Miss Yeung
- Enemy Shadow (1995) - Jade Wong
- Velvet Gloves (1996) - Feng Tin
- Killing Me Hardly (1997) - Sunny
- The Peeping Tom (1997) - Cheng Hsuen
- Raging Angels (1998)
- Leopard Hunting (1998)
- Phantom of Snake (2000)
- Money Laundry (2000)
- Black Cat in Jail (2000)
- Strangers Meet on the Way (2001)
- Could You Kill My Husband Please? (2001)
- U-Man (2002)
- Flying Dragon, Leaping Tiger (2002) - Liu Yun-long
- Brush up My Sisters (2003)
- Black Cat Agent Files (2003)
- The Marksman (2004)
- Kung Fu Tea (2004)
- Kung Fu Mahjong (2005) - Phoenix
- My Wife Can Fight (2006)
- Beautiful 2012 (2012)
- Special Female Force (2016)
- Line Walker (2016)
- The Fatal Raid (2019)

=== TV series ===
- Legend of YungChing (1997)
- Burning Flame (1998)
- A Matter of Customs (2000)
- The Kung Fu Master (2000)
- Battle Against Evil (2002)
- War and Beauty (2004) - Naplan Fuk-ah
- ICAC Investigators 2014 (2014) Episode 5
- Tomorrow Is Another Day (2014) (TV series)
- Tiger Cubs II (2014) Episode 3
- Lady Sour (2014) (TV series)
- Eye in the Sky (2015) (TV series)
- Lord of Shanghai (2015) (TV series)
- Brother's Keeper II (2016) (TV series)
