= C.I.B. Files =

Hong Kong TV drama series

- Official poster
- 刑事情報科
- Genre: Modern Drama
- Starring: Bowie Lam; Wong Hei; Maggie Shiu; Christine Ng
- Opening theme: "情報" by Bowie Lam
- Country of origin: Hong Kong
- Original language: Cantonese
- No. of episodes: 20

Production
- Running time: 45 minutes

Original release
- Network: TVB
- Release: August 14 – September 8, 2006

C.I.B. Files or Criminal Investigation Bureau Files (Traditional Chinese: 刑事情報科) is a TVB modern drama series broadcast in August 2006.

== Cast ==
| Cast | Role | Description |
|---|---|---|
| Bowie Lam | Chung Shun (Tony) 鍾信 | C.I.B. A Team Leader; Chung Ching's older brother. Ching Mei-Lai's husband. |
| Wong Hei | Chung Ching (Mark) 鍾正 | C.I.B. B Team Officer; Chung Shun's younger brother. Hui Sam-Yin's lover. |
| Maggie Shiu | Hui Sam-Yin (Samantha) 許心言 | Magazine Chief Reporter; Chung Ching's lover. |
| Christine Ng | Ching Mei-Lai (Emily) 程美麗 | Magazine Chief Editor; Chung Shun's wife. |
| Kenny Wong (黃德斌) | Hung Ho-Yeung (William Hung) 孔浩祥 | C.I.B. C Team Officer |
| Chan Hung Lit | Chung Kam Yuen (Albert) 鍾金元 | Chung Shun and Chung Ching's father |
| Catherine Chau (周家怡) | Ching Mei-Mei (May) 程美美 | Ching Mei-Lai's younger sister. |

== Viewership ratings ==
| | Week | Episode | Average Points | Peaking Points | References |
|---|---|---|---|---|---|
| 1 | August 14–18, 2006 | 1 — 5 | 31 | — | |
| 2 | August 21–25, 2006 | 6 — 10 | 30 | 31 | |
| 3 | August 28 - September 1, 2006 | 11 — 15 | 31 | 32 | |
| 4 | September 4–8, 2006 | 16 — 20 | 32 | 36 | |
