= Burning Flame II =

- Promo poster
- 烈火雄心 II
- Genre: Modern Action
- Created by: Amy Wong
- Written by: Choi Ting Ting; Wong Wai Keung
- Starring: Wong Hei; Alex Fong; Maggie Cheung Ho-yee; Yoyo Mung; Flora Chan; Stephen Au; Annie Man; Kevin Cheng
- Opening theme: "燈蛾" by Aaron Kwok
- Ending theme: "長痛長愛" by Gigi Leung
- Country of origin: Hong Kong
- Original language: Cantonese
- No. of episodes: 35

Production
- Producer: Amy Wong
- Running time: 45 minutes (approx.)

Original release
- Network: TVB
- Release: July 29 – September 13, 2002

Related
- Burning Flame (1998); Burning Flame III (2009)

Burning Flame II (Traditional Chinese: 烈火雄心II) is a TVB modern action drama that focuses on the duties and challenges of Hong Kong firefighters. Wong Hei continues to be the leading star in this series along with other new cast members including Alex Fong, Maggie Cheung Ho-yee, Stephen Au, Yoyo Mung, and Flora Chan. Although it is the second installment in the Burning Flame series, the story and the characters are completely different from the first.

== Synopsis ==
Kei Tak Tin (Wong Hei) a firefighter whose wife passes away in a traffic accident, being a widower with a young daughter to take care of he does not dare take risks. His cautious and laid back work effects is seen as lazy and cowardly in the eyes of paramedic Chung Yan Yee (Maggie Cheung) who is assigned to the same fire station as him. Since the two are also neighbors they get to know each other and soon Yee see him as a loving and caring father to his young daughter. Yee starts dating Tin's younger brother Mark (Kevin Cheng) whom she had a crush on during her university years. Mark is the total opposite of Tin, he is good looking, well educated and well mannered. The two seem to be in a good relationship, but when Yee's juvenile delinquent past comes back to haunt her, Mark questions if they should really be together. Soon Mark begins dating someone else because of Yee's past and neglects her. When the daughter of a man Yee had injured in the past comes to blackmail her Tin is the only one that helps her deal with her problem. Soon Yee starts to see Tin in a new light and has feelings for him. She breaks up with him Mark, which he did not show any emotions. She and Tin soon starts dating to Tin's daughter delight and she already sees Yee as a mother figure to her.

Wilson (Alex Fong) is a strict firefighter supervisor that demands perfection from his team. He meets reporter Michelle (Flora Chan) during one of his fire rescues. Michelle is smart, well educated and independent when compared to his wife Yan (Yoyo Mung) who he sees as immature, tantrum throwing and very dependent on others. He starts to have feelings for Michelle that Yan eventually finds out about. Feeling that her husband has emotionally cheated on her by having feelings for another women Yan moves out, finds a job and starts providing for herself. She eventually learns to be independent and ask Ming for a divorce. Ironically Yan works for Michelle and both do not know that they love the same man.

== Cast ==
=== Leading Stars ===
- Wong Hei as Peter Kei Tak Tin (紀德田)
- Alex Fong as Wilson Tong Ming (唐明)
- Maggie Cheung Ho-yee as Chris Chung Yan Yee (鍾茵怡)
- Stephen Au as Choi Nam Fung (蔡南豐)
- Yoyo Mung as Yan Kong Yat Ngar (江逸雅)
- Annie Man as Sunnie Yip Heung Yeung (葉向陽)
- Flora Chan as Michelle Ho Po Lam (何寶琳)
- Kevin Cheng as Mark Kei Hing Tin (紀興田)
- Jenny Shing as Kei Yiu (紀瑤)

=== Recurring Stars ===
- Ellesmere Choi as Lam Chui Yin (林聚賢)
- Mimi Chu as Wong Pik Ha (王碧霞)
- Leila Tong as Joey Chan Siu Lan (陳小蘭)
- Yuen Wah as Kwan On Yam (關安蔭)
- Jack Wu as Chow Siu Fai (周兆輝)
- Bosco Wong as Cheung Lei Hei (張利喜)
- Ram Chiang as Leung Man Kung (梁孟功)
- Jimmy Au as Cheng Chi Kwong (鄭志光)
- Lee Sing Cheung as Shum Kwok Cheung (岑國昌)
- Ricky Wong as Firefighter (張偉波)
- Kenneth Ma as Firefighter
- Yuen Tak Cheung as Tam Shui Wo (譚水和)
- Ron Ng as Ah Wah (亞華)

=== Notable Guest Stars ===
- Jessica Hsuan as Choi Siu Ling (蔡少玲)

== Awards and nominations ==
=== 2002 TVB Anniversary Awards ===
- Won: My Favourite Television Character (Wong He)
- Won: My Favourite Television Character (Jenny Shing)
- Won: My Favourite Television Character (Alex Fong)

=== 2002 Ming Pao Weekly Magazine Awards ===
- Won: Performance Action Award (Jessica Hsuan)

=== 2003 Next TV Awards ===
- Top 10 TV Programs (Ranked #3)
