= Heidi Chu =

Hong Kong beauty queen, television presenter and actress

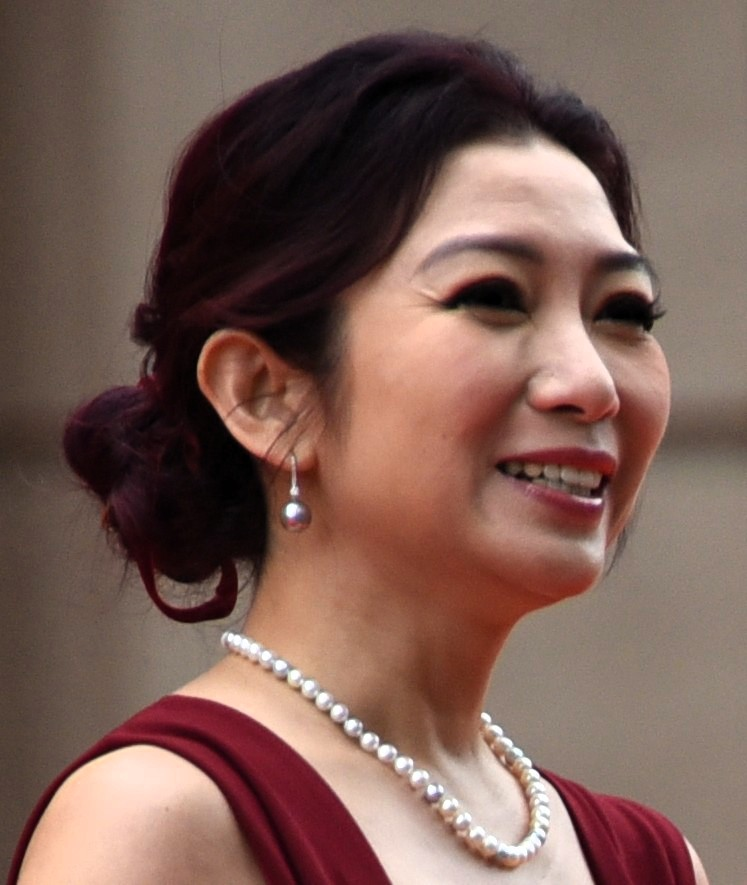
Chu in February 2026

Heidi CHU Hoi Ting (Traditional Chinese: 朱凱婷, born 17 August 1977) is the 2nd runner-up and winner of Miss International Goodwill of the 2001 Miss Hong Kong contest. She also won the Miss Photogenic award in 2001.

== Early life and education ==
Graduated at the Chinese University of Hong Kong in 1999, with major in marketing, she also received a masters in corporate communication from The Chinese University. She is the only daughter of the family.

== Career ==
Heidi works as a presenter and actress of TVB television company, which is also her management agent from 2005. She is also a guest host for MetroFinance radio station. In 2007, she was a Guest DJ at RTHKs (Radio 2 Channel) Morning Suite Program. She was the executive director of the Hong Kong Performing Arts Expo, until she quit in October 2024.

She also works as Master of Ceremony for various types of functions such as press conferences and promotion activities. Apart from her duties with TVB, she has done a lot of MC work for Chinese University. She has a good rapport with the faculty in the business school and the journalism faculty at CUHK.
