= Net Deception =

- Official poster
- 追魂交易
- Genre: Crime drama
- Written by: Chung Ching-leung; Choi Suk-yin
- Starring: Wong Hei; Eddie Kwan; Jack Wu; Myolie Wu; Tiffany Lam
- Opening theme: Fui Sik Hung Bo by Wong He
- Country of origin: Hong Kong
- Original language: Cantonese
- No. of episodes: 20

Production
- Executive producer: Kwan Wing-chung
- Running time: 45 minutes (each)

Original release
- Network: Jade
- Release: 17 May – 9 June 2006

Net Deception (Traditional Chinese: 追魂交易) is a Hong Kong television crime drama serial released overseas in January 2004 and broadcast on Hong Kong's Jade network from 17 May to 9 June 2006.

== Synopsis ==
The winner of the game almost loses his soul!
What can put him back on the path to self-discovery?

Tong Ka-Ming (Jack Wu) is a police cadet who got expelled for hacking into the school system to change his friend's grade. In order to join the police force again, Chong Chin-Pang (Eddie Kwan) made an offer to Ka-Ming, to be an undercover cop. His duty was to get close to Yiu Sing-Tin (Wong Hei) and find his criminal activities. Ka-Ming has no choice but to accept.

Chin Pang's superior had told him to close this case, but he refused because he has some personal differences with Sing-Tin. Yiu Sing-Tin is a successful game developer who opened an Internet cafe to hide his criminal identity which leads Ka-Ming a chance to join his team with his exceptional computer skills. Sing-Tin gives a lot of trust to Ka-Ming, however Ka-Ming makes one wrong move and Sing-Tin finds out his undercover identity...

== Cast ==
Cast	Role	Description
Wong Hei	Yiu Sing-Tin 饒承天	Game Developer; Gamefree game software company / Internet Cafe Owner; Genius computer hacker / criminal genius Kong Kin-Yee's stepbrother. Hong Sin-Yee's boyfriend.
Eddie Kwan (關禮傑)	Chong Chin-Pang 莊展鵬	Police Commercial Crime Bureau Inspector; Handler of Tong Ka-Ming; See Yiu Sing-Tin as an enemy because his comatose girlfriend was in love with Tin.
Jack Wu	Tong Ka-Ming 湯家明	Undercover Police/Hacker; Gamefree game software company / Internet Cafe Staff; Kong Kin-Yee's lover.
Myolie Wu	Kong Kin-Yee 江健兒	Internet Cafe Waitress; Yiu Sing-Tin's stepsister. Tong Ka-Ming's lover.
Tiffany Lam	Hong Sin-Yee (Erica) 康倩儀	Yiu Sing-Tin's girlfriend. Under order of Hon Yi-Leung she befriend Yiu Sing-Tin.
Felix Lok (駱應鈞)	Hon Yi-Leung 韓以亮	Business magnate Secretly uses illegal business method to profit money Try form an illegal business partnership with Yiu Sing-Tin but failed and become enemies Main Villain
Johnson Lee	Chan Bo-Wing 陳寶榮	Friend and admirer of Kong Kin-Yee
Johnson Yuen	康世傑	Younger brother of Hong Sin-Yee; Former Video Game Company Staff; Minor Villain
Stephen Wong	Leung Ka-Chung 梁嘉松	
