= Fathers and Sons (2007 TV series) =

- Poster
- 爸爸閉翳
- Genre: Modern Drama
- Starring: Bobby Au-Yeung; Wong Hei; Yoyo Mung; Tavia Yeung; Ha Yu
- Opening theme: "親近" by Eason Chan
- Country of origin: Hong Kong
- Original language: Cantonese
- No. of episodes: 25

Production
- Producer: Mui Siu Ching
- Running time: 45 minutes

Original release
- Network: TVB
- Release: August 6 – September 7, 2007

Fathers and Sons (Traditional Chinese: 爸爸閉翳) is a TVB modern drama series broadcast in August 2007.

== Synopsis ==
With the smile when you are in trouble,
With his strong helping hand,
Father says, “I‘ll be here, my son.”

Top-ranked market research manager Man Tin-Tzi (Bobby Au Yeung) is an expert at price comparison. His motto is “always be price-conscious.” Tzi, who relishes his yuppie lifestyle, has been longing for an early retirement. But the sudden return of his eight-year-old son seems to have completely shattered his dreams. Tzi has no experience in taking care of children and is totally clueless about how to look after his son. Luckily his ally-cum-rival Amy Kam Mei-Tsun (Yoyo Mung) is there to help and look out for him in every way. The pair gets to know each other better and gradually grow to be great buddies.

Tzi manages to find his godfather Ko Chi-Tim (Ha Yu) when he sees a beef ball. Tim has been trying hard to accommodate himself to his son Ko Ching (Wong Hei), but Ching has given full attention to his own daughter and shows no concern at all for Tim. Ching has focused too much on his daughter: He has completely disregarded his responsibility as a son and a husband. At the darkest moment in his life, Ching is lucky to still have Tzi and his short-time girlfriend Joey Law Sei-Hei (Tavia Yeung) by his side. In the meantime, Ching happens to discover a secret that his father has been hiding all these years: Ching wasn't his natural son. When Ching was just a baby, his natural parents couldn't afford to keep him since his mom was dying. They made a binding contract with their neighbour Ko-Chi Tim in which Tim gets Ching and, in return, they get a huge amount of money. Tim fell in love with his stepson. As time past, the neighbour kept asking for more money to start a new business. Loving Ching so much, Tim took the savings of his family and gave it to the neighbour, and the neighbour was never heard of again. Tim never gambled away the money as Ching thought he had.

Man Tin-Tzi was sued by Kam Mei-Tsun's ex-boyfriend for hitting him in the face. Throughout this time, Man Tin-Tzi and Kam Mei-Tsun saw affection for each other and started dating.

Soon after, when Ching's ex-wife comes back from the States, she wants her daughter back. She told Ching she isn't his daughter and married him because she was pregnant and didn't know what to do. Ching was shocked, but he decided to follow his daughter to America and help with his ex-wife's dad's restaurant, breaking up with Joey. Before he left, Man Tin-Tzi's real dad had died and he had asked for his dad's watch back as it brought back many memories. He also promised his dad that as long as he lives, the beef ball Co. Mui Gei would continue to manufacture beef balls. As Ching left for the States, Man Tin-Tzi gives himself to Tim and offered to be his son. Tim accepted and Man Tin-Tzi started calling him Dad. With Mui Gei not doing well due to Kam Mei-Tsun's ex-boyfriend messing with their company, Tim has a stroke and goes into a coma...

== Cast ==
Cast	Role	Description
Bobby Au Yeung	Man Tin-Tzi/Lui Ka-Chuen 閔天賜/呂家全	Marketing Director; Kam Mei-Tsun's lover.
Yoyo Mung	Kam Mei-Tsun (Amy) 金美鑽	Supermarket Manager; Man Tin Tzi's lover.
Ha Yu	Ko Chi-Tim 高志添	Ko Ching father. Man Tin-Tzi's godfather.
Wong Hei	Ko Ching/Shum Shing-Fu 高青/沈成富	Law Sei-Hei's lover. Ching Yeuk-Szi's husband. Ko Chi-Tim's son.
Tavia Yeung	Law Sei-Hei (Joey) 羅四喜	Tutor; Ko Ching's lover Lui Ka-Sing's lover.
Halina Tam	Ching Yeuk-Szi 程若詩	Ko Ching's wife
Jacky Wong (zh:王樹熹)	Man Yu-Hang (Jimmy) 閔宇恆	Man Tin-Tzi's son
Anne Heung	Nicole	Man Tin-Tzi's lover Break-up due to Jimmy
Mak Cheung-ching	Lui Ka-Chai	Kam Mei-Tsun's ex-lover main villain
Lai Lok-yi	Lui Ka-Sing 呂家聲	Law Sei - He's lover

== Viewership ratings ==
	Week	Episode	Average Points	Peaking Points	References
1	August 6–10, 2007	1 — 5	31	38	
2	August 13–17, 2007	6 — 10	30	35	
3	August 20–24, 2007	11 — 15	33	36	
4	August 27–31, 2007	16 — 20	32	37	
5	September 3–7, 2007	21 — 25	37	40	

== Awards and nominations ==
40th TVB Anniversary Awards (2007)

- "Best Drama"
- "Best Actor in a Leading Role" (Wong He - Ko Ching)
- "Best Actress in a Supporting Role" (Mary Hon - Li Dai-Choi)
- "My Favourite Male Character Role" (Bobby Au-Yeung - Man Tin-Tzi)
- "My Favourite Male Character Role" (Wong He - Ko Ching)
