= Men Don't Cry =

- Poster
- 奸人堅
- Genre: Period Comedy
- Starring: Dayo Wong; Dominic Lam; Cecilia Yip; Benz Hui; Vivien Yeo
- Opening theme: "奸人堅" by Dayo Wong
- Country of origin: Hong Kong
- Original language: Cantonese
- No. of episodes: 21

Production
- Running time: 45 minutes (approx.)

Original release
- Network: TVB
- Release: October 8 – November 2, 2007

Men Don't Cry (Traditional Chinese: 奸人堅) is a TVB period comedy series broadcast in October 2007, to celebrate TVB's 40th Anniversary. The shown was rerun from Thursday, January 29, 2009, to February 26, 2009, from Monday to Friday at 12:05 am on TVB Jade in Hong Kong.

The Chinese title is a reference to Shi Jian, who had played as villains in many Wong Fei Hung movies featuring Kwan Tak Hing as Wong Fei Hung, and later in TVB's television series.

Reversing the trends set by previous Wong Fei Hung stories, the title archvillain assumes the leading role of the series, with Wong Fei Hung as the supporting role.

== Synopsis ==
With the support of the head of the Police Authority, Guangzhou's top villain Ho Kei-Kin (Dayo Wong) has been riding roughshod over everyone around him. He is so manipulative that he has explored every possible means in his fight for a house with the buck-toothed owner Ling Yuk Tsui (Cecilia Yip).

However, he was originally a kind-hearted person. His change of heart was due to him being mistreated by his father back when he was a child. His father once nailed him inside the coffin, which led to his fear of being trapped in the dark. When he grew up, his father left the town with one of his many mistresses and her son. When Kin went to confront his father, the father retorts and says that Kin wasn't really his biological son, saying that some stranger is his father. His father also said that he was glad to have a son who is more skilled than him and that Kin is nothing but a weakling to him. After that, he left by boat. Angry by this, Kin cursed at his father, his mistress and their son, saying that they won't live to regret this. When he tried to redeem himself by fighting the town's crime lord, he was defeated by not only the crime lord but also the townspeople. Fed up with the town, he causes chaos to the town by wrecking and burning some stalls. As the crime lord and the townspeople were about to subdue him, one of his henchman told him that the boat that carried Kin's father exploded and that everyone on that boat died, including his father, his mistress and his son. Kin said that he was happy that happened because they had insulted him and that his prophecy of them not living to regret it had come true. He also declares that he won't go by his given name. He will only go by the nickname Gan Yan-Kin (Bully Kin). He decided that to get through life, he must treat others really badly as they have treated him.

Tsui is happy to have met the upright and honorable Wong Fei-Hung (Dominic Lam). Interested in stirring up trouble, Kin tries to recruit more students for his kung-fu school by portraying himself as the hero who has defeated one of the Ten Tigers of Guangdong Wong Kei-Ying. For the sake of fairness, Hung is resolved to have a contest with Kin. Unfortunately, Kin manages to make Hung give in with the help of the ancestral tablet of his late father. Thinking that he is a hopeless coward, Tsui decides to break off her engagement to Hung. Kin quickly grabs the chance and begins to woo Tsui. Tsui agrees to transfer her house to Kin after much persuasion from him. Kin shows his true colors as soon as he has secured the property. Tsui is left homeless and has to put up at Po Chi Lam, the martial arts club/medicine shop set up by Hung. Kin has lost his power and soon becomes an object of contempt and hatred. With nowhere else to go, he decides to turn to Hung and asks to be his apprentice. Hung has tried his best to bring out the human side of Kin, for which he has received a lot of criticism from others. Despite Hung's support, Kin does not repent and behaves even worse than before, leaving Po Chi Lam in a state of total chaos...

Kin's plan was unveiled when Wong Fei Hung tried to win the 3rd lion dancing competition, where Wong Fei Hung realized he had drunk the soup with five stone powder (a form of ancient narcotic) added by Kin. Kin offered the choice of soup or lose the competition. Wong Fei Hung won the contest without the soup, but Wong did not tell others about the incident. Disillusioned by Wong's unusual integrity, Kin decided to live up to Wong Fei Hung's reputation.

After the arrests of gang leader Chiu Man Ting and officer Fong Tin Yuen, Wong Fei Hung began to lose his vision as a result of the drugs. Wong Fei Hung appointed Kin to run Po Chi Lam, despite objections by others. Despite Kin's attempts to help his fellow fighters, they ended up making things worse. Former associate Kam Chin-Pao mistaken believed Kin became Po Chi Lam leader was a plan to take over the street as gang leader, so Kam Chin-Pao started a gang of his own...

== Cast ==
Cast	Role	Description
Dayo Wong	Ho Kei-Kin (Evil Kin) 何其堅 (奸人堅)	
Cecilia Yip	Ling Yuk-Chui (Buck Teeth Girl) 凌玉翠 (哨牙妹)	Lau Yik-Bik's older sister.
Dominic Lam	Wong Fei Hung 黃飛鴻	Kung Fu Master
Benz Hui	So Fei 蘇飛	Wong Fei-Hung's assistant.
Vivien Yeo	Lau Yuk-Bik 凌玉碧	Kong Sung-Yue's daughter.
Charmaine Li	Fok Tsang-Nei (Jenny) 霍珍妮	
Alex Lam (林子善)	Kam Chin-Pao 金錢豹	Ho Kei-Kin's assistant.
Wu Fung	Wong Chi-Mo 黃志摩	Wong Fei-Hung's uncle.

== Viewership ratings ==
	Week	Episode	Average Points	Peaking Points	References
1	October 8–12, 2007	1 — 5	29	32	
2	October 15–19, 2007	6 — 10	27	—	
3	October 22–26, 2007	11 — 15	29	34	
4	October 29 - November 2, 2007	16 — 21	32	39	

== Criticisms ==
TVB reported it had received 15 complaints claiming the series is bad influence to children, contains vulgar dialogues, discriminating buck teeth and villainize Wong Fei Hung. Hong Kong Broadcasting Authority had received 36 complaints for the series.

At the 2nd week of the Hong Kong broadcast, Hong Kong Broadcasting Authority claimed it had 80 accumulated complaints over the series.

== Awards and nominations ==
40th TVB Anniversary Awards (2007)

- "Best Drama"
- "Best Actor in a Leading Role" (Dayo Wong - Ho Kei-Kin (Evil Kin))
- "Best Actress in a Leading Role" (Cecilia Yip - Ling Yuk-Chui)
- "Best Actress in a Supporting Role" (Charmaine Li - Jenny Fok Tsang-Nei)
- "My Favourite Male Character Role" (Dayo Wong - Ho Kei-Kin (Evil Kin))
- "My Favourite Male Character Role" (Dominic Lam - Wong Fei-Hung)
- "My Favourite Female Character Role" (Cecilia Yip - Ling Yuk-Chui)
