= A Watchdog's Tale =

- Official poster
- 老友狗狗
- Genre: Modern Drama
- Starring: Linda Chung; Steven Ma; Kent Cheng; Natalie Tong; Raymond Wong; Maggie Shiu
- Opening theme: "老友狗狗" by Steven Ma & Linda Chung
- Country of origin: Hong Kong
- Original language: Cantonese
- No. of episodes: 20

Production
- Producer: Leung Choi Yuen
- Running time: 45 minutes (approx.)

Original release
- Network: TVB
- Release: December 28, 2009 – January 23, 2010

A Watchdog's Tale
- Title screen shot
- Traditional Chinese: 老友狗狗
- Simplified Chinese: 老友狗狗
- Literal meaning: "Friends of Dogs"
Transcriptions
Standard Mandarin
- Hanyu Pinyin: Lǎo Yǒu Gǒu Gǒu
Yue: Cantonese
- Jyutping: Lou5 Jau5 Gau2 Gau2

A Watchdog's Tale (Traditional Chinese: 老友狗狗, literally Friends of Dogs), is a 2010 TVB modern drama series. It stars Linda Chung and Steven Ma as the main leads, with Kent Cheng, Natalie Tong, Raymond Wong and Maggie Shiu as the major supporting cast.

== Synopsis ==
Lai Chun Sing (Kent Cheng) has been in the police force for 30 years. During one investigation, his assistant police dog sacrificed its life to save him. Struck by the death, Sing decided to join the Police Dog Unit. In 25 years, he advanced from a dog caretaker to an instructor and he now plans to use his retirement money to open a dog care center, allowing dog owners to bring their dogs for training and play.

Sing's wife died a long time ago, but left him with an obedient daughter, Lai Sin Yue (Linda Chung). Yue follows after her father and loves animals as if they were human. This eventually leads Yue to become a veterinarian. She later decides to help her dad and moves to the countryside to help with his dog care center. Her determination is driven by the fact that she wants to make sure all animals are treated lovingly.

In the countryside, they soon meet the rowdy bunch that lives there. Chow Yung Kung (Steven Ma) is the renovator who is in charge of preparing the dog care center. Yue and Kung initially start off on the wrong foot, but the two eventually start developing feelings for each other as they spend more time together. They start to fall in love with each other, but Sing refuses to accept Kung as his daughter's boyfriend, saying that Kung has no education and no stable job. To make things more complicated, Kung's ex-girlfriend (Queenie Chu) reappears with a vengeance.

The two side stories involve Chiang Tin-Ngo (Maggie Shiu), her brother Tin-Hung (Joseph Lee), Chou Ka-Man (Natalie Tong), and Ho Tin-Yau (Raymond Wong Ho-yin). Tin-Hung has always been looked down upon by his father and sister as a failure. He wants to start his own business, but his father will not loan him the money, believing all of his son's ideas are bound to end up a disaster. His sister refuses to help him plead their father, so Tin-Hung resorts to kidnapping Tin-Ngo and demanding their father for a large sum of money.

Tin-Ngo then devotes herself to finding the kidnapper, believing it is someone in the nearby countryside. She monitors all of the villagers closely, looking for something suspicious. She even decides to move in to study them closer. Tin-Hung, scared that his sister might figure out the kidnapper was him, moves himself to the countryside too, attempting to prevent Tin-Ngo from getting any serious evidence. While she is there, Tin-Ngo starts to develop feelings for Sing, but she is rejected and runs away.

Meanwhile, Tin-Yau is a striving police officer that wants to do the best he can at his job. Ka-Man has a crush on him, but Tin-Yau refuses to admit his feelings for her. However, the two eventually become a couple. Ka-Man's dad is a drug dealer and is scared that with Tin-Yau always around the house, he'll stumble upon his hidden drugs. Ka-Man's dad tells them to break up, but Ka-Man refuses. Unknown to her, Ka-Man has been hauling around a bowling ball stuffed with crystal meth that she thinks is a present from her dad...

Will Sing learn to accept Kung and Yue? Will Yue and Kung overcome tides of difficulty? Will Tin-Ngo find out who kidnapped her? And will Ka-Man find her birth mother, as well as reconcile with her dad and Tin-Yau?

== Cast ==
=== Chow family ===
| Cast | Role | Description |
|---|---|---|
| Ching Hor Wai | Leung Ah-ping 梁亞萍 | Chow Yung-Kung's Foster Mother; Ho Tin-Yau's Aunt |
| Steven Ma | Chow Yung-Gung 周用恭 | Renovator; Lai Sin-Yue's Lover then Husband; Leung Ah-Ping's foster son |
| Raymond Wong | Ho Tin-Yau 何天佑 | Police Canine Unit Officer; Chow Yung-Gung's Younger Cousin. Chou Ka Man's Boyfriend then Husband; Leung Ah Ping's Nephew; Lai Tsun-Sing's Disciple |

=== Lai family ===
| Cast | Role | Description |
|---|---|---|
| Kent Cheng | Lai Tsun-Sing 黎俊升 | Retired Officer; Doggie Dog Kernel Manager; Lai Sin-Yue's father |
| Linda Chung | Lai Sin-Yue 黎羨如 | Veterinarian; Lai Tsun-Sing's daughter. Chow Yung-Gung's Lover then Wife |

=== Cheung Sing Village ===
| Cast | Role | Description |
|---|---|---|
| Natalie Tong | Chou Ka-Man (Carman) 周嘉汶 | Chou Wai Wai's Daughter; Ho Tin-Yau's Girlfriend then wife |
| Kwok Fung (郭鋒) | Chou Wai-Wai 周偉威 | Chou Ka Man's father Drug Dealer then opened a book store instead of the bar in episode 20; Manager of a Bar then Manager of a book store |
| Yvonne Lam | Chan Mei Leen 陳美蓮 | Owner Of Local Store; Chow Yung Fat's wife |
| Ram Chiang | Chow Yung Fat 周用發 | Owner of Local Store; Chan Mei Leen's husband |

=== Chiang family ===
| Cast | Role | Description |
|---|---|---|
| Wu Fung | Cheung Ying Gwun 蔣應鈞 | Chiang Tin-Ngo and Chiang Tin-Hung's father |
| Joseph Lee | Chiang Tin-Hung 蔣天雄 | Chiang Tin-Ngo's older brother Ma Cheuk Ling's lover |
| Maggie Shiu | Chiang Tin-Ngo 蔣天娥 | Chiang Tin Hung's younger sister In love with Lai Tsun-Sing |

=== Other cast ===
| Cast | Role | Description |
|---|---|---|
| Koni Lui | Ma Cheuk-Ling 馬卓玲 | Undercover Police Officer WPC66349; Chiang Tin Hung's lover |
| Queenie Chu | Yun See See 院思思 | Chow Yung Gung's ex-girlfriend Discovered mental |
| Mak Cheung-ching | Ngan Dai Keung 顏大強 | Triad leader |
| Shermon Tang | Wong Ka Man 黃雅文 (Jessie) | Police Officer |

== Awards and nominations ==
TVB Anniversary Awards (2010)

- Won: Most Improved Male Artiste (Raymond Wong Ho-yin)
- Won: Most Improved Female Artiste (Natalie Tong)
- Nominated: Best Drama
- Nominated: Best Supporting Actress (Maggie Siu)
- Nominated: My Favourite Male Character (Steven Ma) - Top 5

Next TV Awards (2010)

- Won: Top 10 TV series (No.8)
- Won: Top 10 TV artists (Linda Chung - No.6)

== Viewership ratings ==
| | Week | Episodes | Average Points | Peaking Points | References |
|---|---|---|---|---|---|
| 1 | December 28, 2009 - January 1, 2010 | 1 — 5 | 30 | 33 | |
| 2 | January 4–6, 2010 | 6 — 8 | 31 | — | |
| 3 | January 11–15, 2010 | 9 — 13 | 32 | 34 | |
| 4 | January 18–22, 2010 | 14 — 18 | 31 | — | |
| 4 | January 23, 2010 | 19 — 20 | 32 | 35 | |
