= The Academy (franchise) =

Hong Kong television drama

- 學警系列
- Genre: Modern action Drama; Crime thriller Police procedural drama
- Written by: Lee Yee-wah(I-III); Choi Suk Yin (I, LOO); Lau Choi-wan (I-II); Chu Keng-kei (III); Leung Yan-tung (III); Sharon Au (film, LOO)
- Opening theme: I: "勇者" by Rico Kwok, Zac Ko, Ron Ng and Sky; II: "邁向夢想的天空" by Ron Ng, Deep Ng and Kenny Kwan; III: "黑白變奏" by Michael Tse, Ron Ng and Sammul Chan; LOO: "獨行" by Michael Tse
- Ending theme: I: "I Wanna Love You" by Angela Pang and Zac Ko; II: "密友" by Joey Yung; III: "手掌印" by Elanne Kong "無愧於心" by Kathy Chow; LOO: "底線" by Bosco Wong
- Country of origin: Hong Kong
- Original language: Cantonese
- No. of series: 3, 3 spin-offs
- No. of episodes: 122 (I–III, LoO)

Production
- Executive producers: Wong Wai Sing (I-III); Tommy Leung (film, film II); Chong Wai-kin (LoO)
- Production location: Hong Kong
- Camera setup: Multi camera
- Running time: 45 minutes (per episode)
- Production company: TVB

Original release
- Network: TVB Jade
- Release: 11 April 2005 – present

The Academy
- Traditional Chinese: 學警系列
- Simplified Chinese: 学警系列
- Literal meaning: "Police Cadets series"
Transcriptions
Standard Mandarin
- Hanyu Pinyin: Xúejíng Xìliè
Yue: Cantonese
- Jyutping: Hok6 Ging2 Haai6 Lit6

The Academy is a Hong Kong TVB modern drama focusing on two young men (played by Ron Ng and Sammul Chan) from entering and training at the police academy to joining the police force and solving crime.

== The original series ==
- 2005: TV series The Academy
- 2007: TV series On the First Beat
- 2009: TV series E.U

== Spin-offs ==
- 2009: Film Turning Point
- 2011: TV series Lives of Omission
- 2011: Film Turning Point 2

== Cast ==
Cast	Role	TA	OTFB	E.U.	TP	LOO	TP II
Ron Ng	Chung Lap-man						
Ron Ng	Police Constable						
Sammul Chan	Lee Pak-kiu						
Sammul Chan	Police Constable						
Michael Miu	Lee Man-sing						
Michael Miu	Kong Sai-hau						
Michael Tse	Leung Siu-tong (Laughing Gor)						
Anthony Wong	Brother One						
Francis Ng	Zatoi						
Francis Ng	Fok Tin-yam						
Michael Tao	Cheung King-fung						
Felix Wong	Poon Man-kei						
Kathy Chow	Ching Yeuk-sum						
Sonija Kwok	Winnie Yuen						
Tavia Yeung	Ho Fa						
Joey Yung	Cheung Nim-yan						
Fiona Sit	Fiona Ma						
Elanne Kong	Kong Yau-yau						
Michelle Yim	Chan Yin-ting						
Waise Lee	Chung Chi-wah						
Kate Tsui	Man Ching						
Kate Tsui	Paris Yiu						
Fala Chen	Karen						
Fala Chen	Jodie "Madam Jo" Chau						
Bosco Wong	Michael "Crippled Co" So						
Damian Lau	Harry Kung						
Leung Ka Ki	Fa Yeuk-po						
Chin Kar-lok	Ken Kuk						
Dominic Lam	Wu Cheuk-yan						
Eric Tsang	Master Ford						
Yuen Biao	Sin Sir						
Wayne Lai	Mo						
Kenny Wong	Hon Chin-lung						
Kenny Wong	Che Chai						
Lee Ka Ting	Master Ting						
Johnson Lee	Child						
Koni Lui	-						
Tracy Ip	-						
Anna Yau	-						
Angelina Lo	Ma Ying-oi						
Ellesmere Choi	Kwok Kai-chiu						
Oscar Chan	Kwok Kai-pong						
Casper Chan	Ling Yiu						
Dickson Lee	Lam Suk-chuen						
Anita Kwan	Peggy Yeung						
Selena Li	Yip Ling-fung						
Yan Ng	Kam Siu-po						
Kenny Kwan	Yuen Ka-fu						
Deep Ng	Ho Ming						
Wada Hiromi	Sze Kuen						
Florence Kwok	Tong Ching-nga						
King Kong	Hon Chi-chung						
King Kong	-						
Edwin Siu	-						
Lam Lei	To Yik-tin						
Jason Pai	Sze To-chiu						
Priscilla Ku	Ann Ko						
Patrick Dunn	Tam Cho-ming						
Power Chan	Lai Chi-kin						
Zac Ko	On Chi-ho						
Aimee Chan	Wendy Chiu						
Lorretta Chow	-						
Sherry Chen	-						
Dickson Wong	-						
Oscar Leung	Chan Chung-wo						
Oscar Leung	Siu Lung						
Lai Tung Hong	-						
Benjamin Yuen	-						
Matthew Ko	-						
Matthew Ko	Lo Yan Chak						
Matthew Ko	Tomson Tong						
Joel Chan	Fai Wing-lun (Tsor-lun)						
Law Koon Lan	Queenie Chan						
Felix Lok	Kwok Pui						
Kara Hui	Wong Suk-yin						
Kara Hui	Sa Po Yau						
Gordon Liu	Yuen Moon						
Astrid Chan	Karen						
Poon Hiu Tung	Chung Ka-lai						
Elena Kong	Yuen Kwan-lam						
Mary Hon	Ho Sau-mei						
Mandy Wong	Vicky "Ah Mung" Mung						
Mandy Wong	Vicky Mung						
Derek Kwok	Szeto Hoi (Dog Head)						
Ben Wong	Po Lik-chi						
Ben Wong	Tang Kwok-ban (Spicy Ginger)						
Ben Wong	-						
Cheung Kwok-keung	Mok Ka-lit						
Ronald Law	Kwok Ting-tin (T Two)						
Adrian Chau	Fong Chun-lung (Fire Dragon)						
Daniel Chau	Suen Siu-kit (Young Master Kit)						
Yu Yeung	Victor Fung						
Bella Lam	Lam Po-tim (Bubble)						
Liu Kai-chi	Ho Sam						
Liu Kai-chi	Cheuk King-chuen						
Chapman To	Tai Chit						
Janice Man	Carmen						
Rebecca Zhu	Miss Choi						
Lau Siu Ming	Ye Po						
Lam Suet	Kui Chuen						
Ram Cheung	-						
Henry Lee	Chik Wai-yin						
Joseph Lee	Pang Ho-leung						

== Viewership ratings ==
Installment	Episodes	Timeslot	Episode premiere	Episode finale	HK viewers (in millions)	Average rating
The Academy	32	Monday – Friday 21:00	11 April 2005	24 May 2005	N/A	N/A
On the First Beat	30	Monday – Friday 21:30	4 June 2007	13 July 2007	~2.01	31.17
E.U.	30	Monday – Friday 20:30	16 February 2009	27 March 2009	~1.95	30.17
Lives of Omission	30	Monday – Friday 21:30	1 August 2011	9 September 2011	~1.97	30.7
