= TVB Anniversary Award for Most Popular Male Character =

Hong Kong television award

- Awarded for: "Popular Performance by an Actor in a Television Role"
- Country: Hong Kong
- Presented by: Television Broadcasts Limited (TVB)
- First award: 2006
- Currently held by: Kalok Chow - Your Highness (2022)
- Website: http://birthday.tvb.com/

The TVB Anniversary Award for Most Popular Male Character is one of the TVB Anniversary Awards presented annually by Television Broadcasts Limited (TVB) to recognize an actor who has delivered a popular performance in a Hong Kong television drama role throughout the designated year. The My Favourite Male Television Role (我最喜愛的電視男角色) was not introduced to the awards ceremony until 2006, nine years after its establishment. In 2013, the name was changed to Most Popular Male Television Role (最受歡迎電視男角色).

The original equivalent of the award was called My Favourite Television Roles of the Year (本年度我最喜愛的電視角色), which was created in 2003. The award was given to 12 winners for both actors and actresses. In 2006, the award was divided into two separate gender categories and reduced to one specific winner.

== Winners and nominees ==
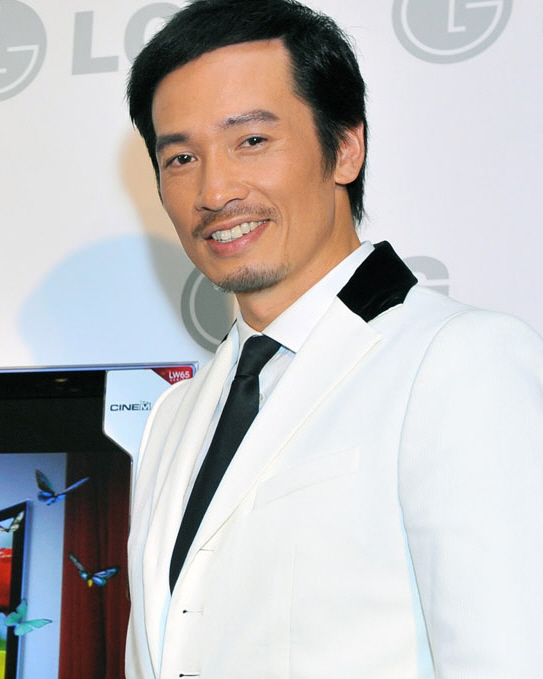
Moses Chan won in 2007 for his portrayal of "Duk Duk Dei" in Heart of Greed.

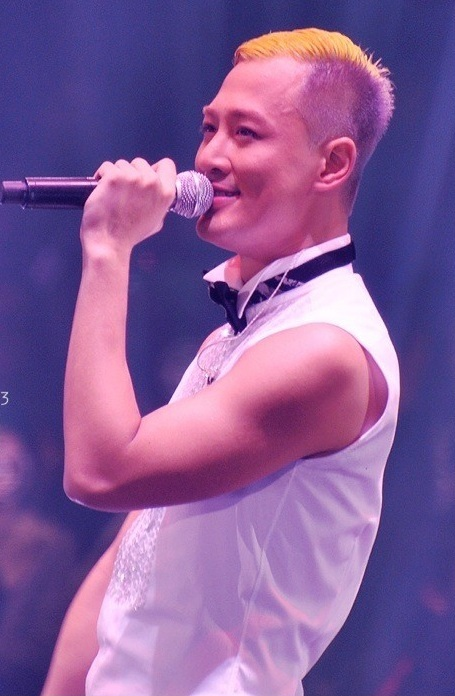
Raymond Lam won in 2008 for his portrayal of Kam Wing-ho in Moonlight Resonance. At 28, he was the youngest winner in record. Lam won again in 2010 for his portrayal of Professor King in The Mysteries of Love.

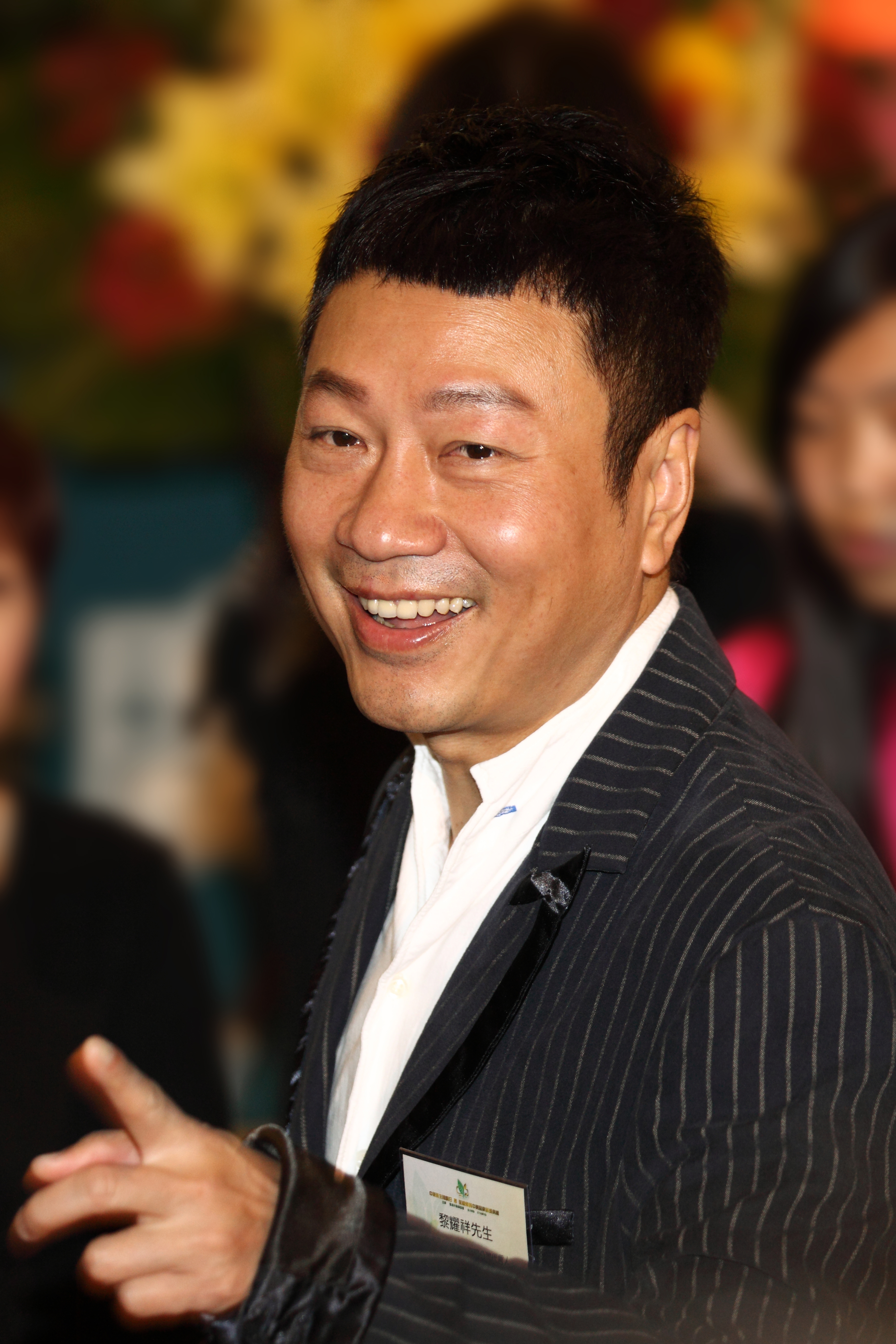
Wayne Lai won in 2009 for his portrayal of Chai Kau in Rosy Business. He also won Best Actor for the same role.

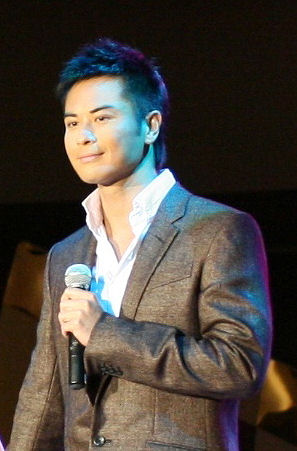
Kevin Cheng won in 2011 for his portrayal of Law Ba in Ghetto Justice. He also won Best Actor for the same role.

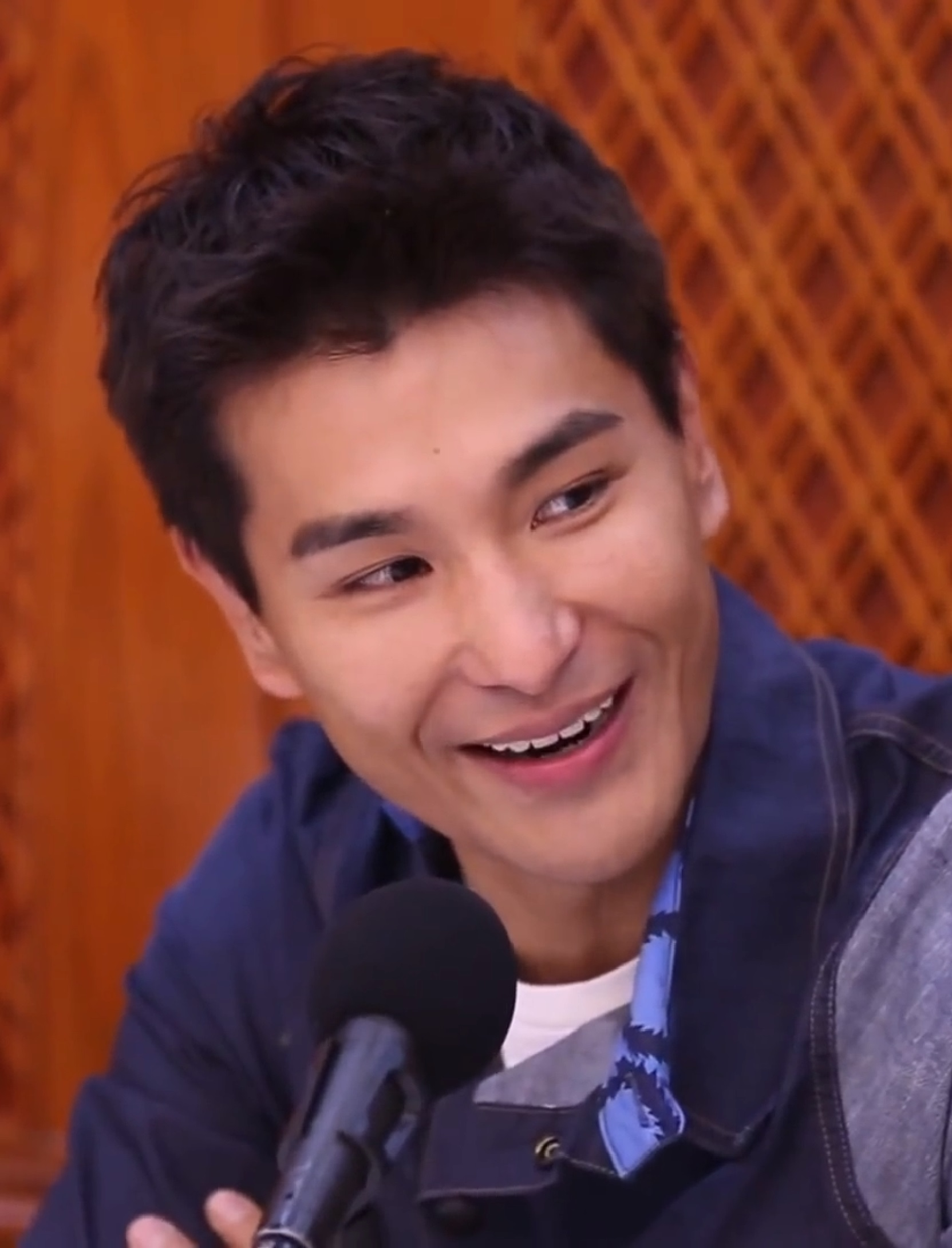
Ruco Chan won in 2015 for his portrayal of the Eleventh Prince in Captain of Destiny.

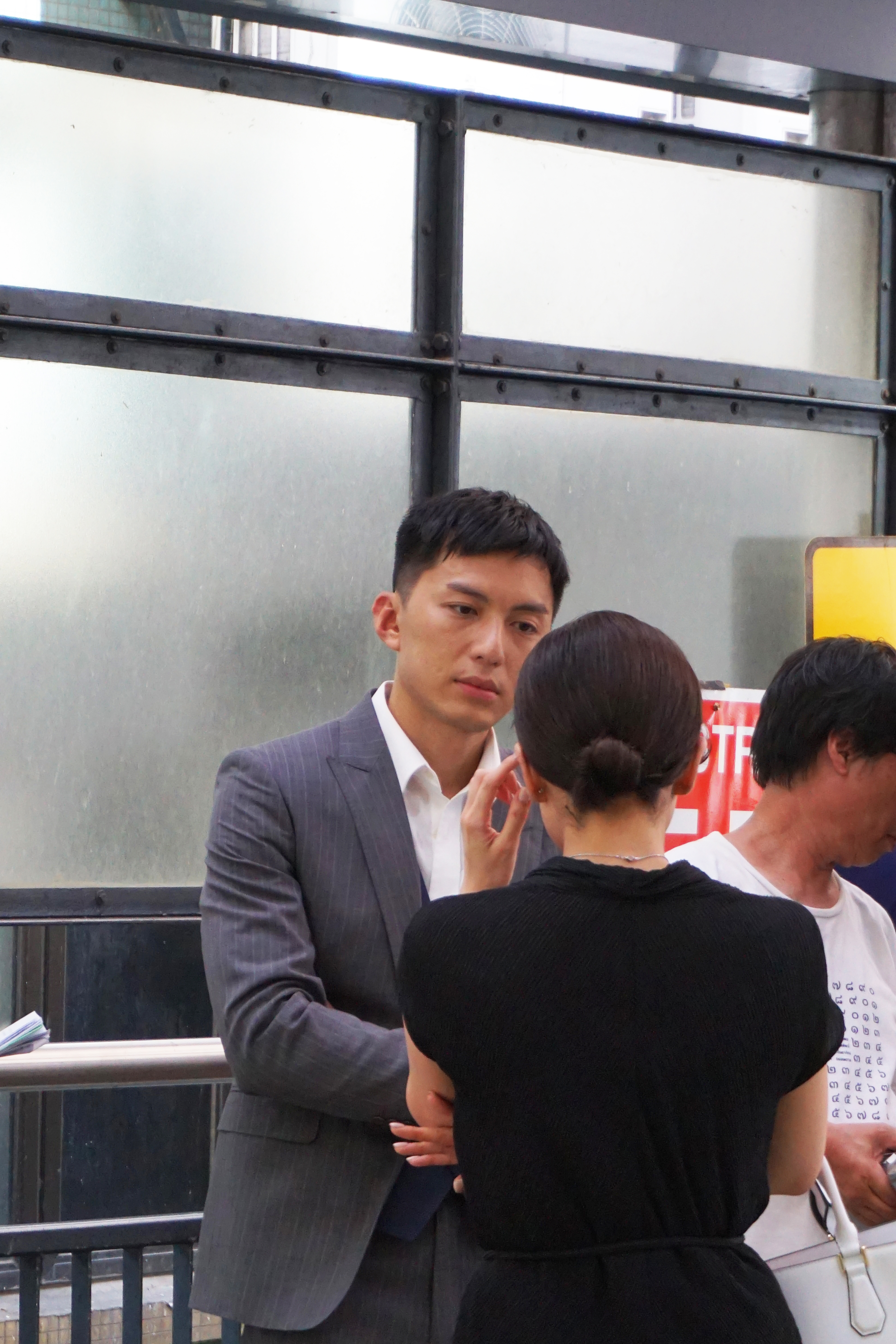
Benjamin Yuen won in 2016 for his portrayal of Duen Ying-fung in A Fist Within Four Walls.

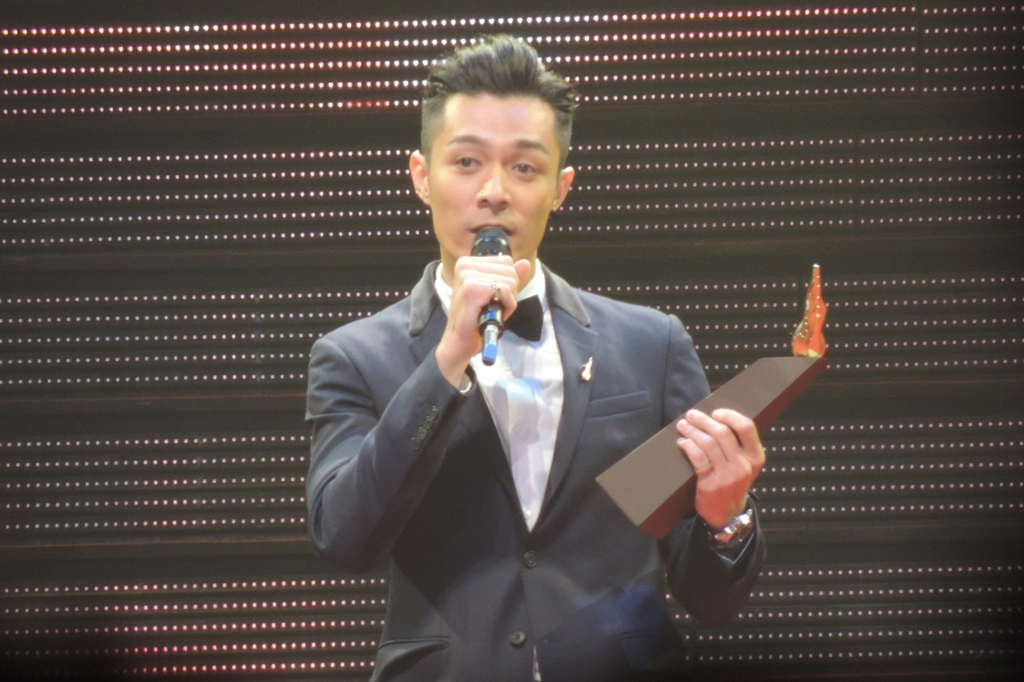
Pakho Chau won in 2019 for his portrayal of Wing Ho-tin in Wonder Women.

TVB nominates at least ten actors for the category each year. The following table lists only the actors who have made it to the top five nominations during the designated awards ceremony. There were no top five nominations from 2012 to 2014.

Table key
†	Indicates the winner

=== 2000s ===
Year	Actor	Drama	Role(s)
2006 (10th)
2006 (10th)	Steven Ma †	Safe Guards	Sheung Chi
2006 (10th)	Kevin Cheng	Under the Canopy of Love	Alan Shum
2006 (10th)	Raymond Lam	La Femme Desperado	Chai Foon
2006 (10th)	Bowie Lam	The Dance of Passion	Yim Man-hei
2006 (10th)	Joe Ma	Maidens' Vow	Yu Chi / Lee Kat-cheung / Tai Lap-yan / Fong Ka-on (K.O.)
2007 (11th)
2007 (11th)	Moses Chan †	Heart of Greed	Tong Chi-on (Duk Duk Dei)
2007 (11th)	Ha Yu	Heart of Greed	Tong Yan-kai
2007 (11th)	Raymond Lam	Heart of Greed	Alfred Ching
2007 (11th)	Bobby Au-yeung	Fathers and Sons	Yim Tin-chee
2007 (11th)	Dayo Wong	Men Don't Cry	Ho Kei-gin
2008 (12th)
2008 (12th)	Raymond Lam †	Moonlight Resonance	Kam Wing-ho
2008 (12th)	Kenneth Ma	Survivor's Law II	MK Sun
2008 (12th)	Roger Kwok	D.I.E.	SGT Yu Chi-long
2008 (12th)	Michael Tse	The Money-Maker Recipe	Wong Chi-chung
2008 (12th)	Ha Yu	Moonlight Resonance	Kam Tai-jo
2009 (13th)
2009 (13th)	Wayne Lai †	Rosy Business	Chai Kau
2009 (13th)	Moses Chan	The Gem of Life	Terrence Ho
2009 (13th)	Michael Tse	E.U.	Leung Siu-tong (Laughing Gor)
2009 (13th)	Dayo Wong	You're Hired	Mak Tai-song
2009 (13th)	Kevin Cheng	Beyond the Realm of Conscience	Ko Hin-yeung

=== 2010s ===
Year	Actor	Drama	Role(s)
2010 (14th)
2010 (14th)	Raymond Lam †	The Mysteries of Love	Professor Kingsley King
2010 (14th)	Steven Ma	A Watchdog's Tale	Chow Yung-kung
2010 (14th)	Kenneth Ma	A Fistful of Stances	Koo Yu-tong
2010 (14th)	Moses Chan	Can't Buy Me Love	Kam Tuo-luk
2010 (14th)	Wayne Lai	No Regrets	Lau Sing
2011 (15th)
2011 (15th)	Kevin Cheng †	Ghetto Justice	L.A. Law (Law Ba)
2011 (15th)	Ruco Chan	The Other Truth	Keith Lau
2011 (15th)	Michael Tse	Lives of Omission	SSGT Leung Siu-tong (Laughing)
2011 (15th)	Bosco Wong	Lives of Omission	Michael "Crippled Co" So
2011 (15th)	Wayne Lai	Forensic Heroes III	Dr. Jack "Pro Sir" Po
2012 (16th)	Kenneth Ma †	The Hippocratic Crush	Dr. Cheung Yat-kin
2013 (17th)	Julian Cheung †	Triumph in the Skies II	Jayden "Captain Cool" Koo
2014 (18th)	Hui Shiu-hung †	Line Walker	Cham Foon-hei (Foon Hei Gor)
2015 (19th)
2015 (19th)	Ruco Chan †	Captain of Destiny	Man-ho, the Eleventh Prince
2015 (19th)	Moses Chan	Ghost of Relativity	Michael Mai
2015 (19th)	Louis Cheung	Momentary Lapse of Reason	Kam Wah
2015 (19th)	Anthony Wong	Lord of Shanghai	Kiu Ngo-tin
2015 (19th)	Kenneth Ma	Lord of Shanghai	Kiu Ngo-tin (youth)
2016 (20th)
2016 (20th)	Benjamin Yuen †	A Fist Within Four Walls	Duen Ying-fung
2016 (20th)	Vincent Wong	Over Run Over	Kwan Ding-ming
2016 (20th)	Bobby Au-yeung	House of Spirits	Po Foon
2016 (20th)	Ruco Chan	A Fist Within Four Walls	Chor Au-kuen
2016 (20th)	Louis Cheung	Two Steps from Heaven	Tim Yau
2017 (21st)
2017 (21st)	Kenneth Ma †	The Exorcist's Meter	Ma Kwai
2017 (21st)	Edwin Siu	A General, a Scholar, and a Eunuch	Yuan Chonghuan / Wan Tai-kwan
2017 (21st)	Benjamin Yuen	Line Walker: The Prelude	Tsui Tin-tong
2017 (21st)	Vincent Wong	My Unfair Lady	"Saving" Ching Yat-fai
2017 (21st)	Moses Chan	My Ages Apart	Mike Kwong
2018 (22nd)
2018 (22nd)	Kenneth Ma †	Deep in the Realm of Conscience	Yam Sam-shu
2018 (22nd)	Lai Lok-yi	Who Wants a Baby?	Elvis Yip
2018 (22nd)	Joe Ma	Life on the Line	Mak Choi-tin
2018 (22nd)	Ben Wong	OMG, Your Honour	John Fan
2018 (22nd)	Dicky Cheung	The Learning Curve of a Warlord	Tik Kei
2019 (23rd)
2019 (23rd)	Pakho Chau †	Wonder Women	Wing Ho-tin
2019 (23rd)	Philip Keung	The Defected	Yau Bing-gou (Bingo)
2019 (23rd)	Kenneth Ma	Big White Duel	Tong Ming
2019 (23rd)	Joel Chan	Barrack O'Karma	Siu Wai-ming / Lau Yuk-fai
2019 (23rd)	Vincent Wong	The Man Who Kills Trouble	Orson O

=== 2020s ===
Year	Actor	Drama	Role(s)
2020 (24th)
2020 (24th)	Owen Cheung	Al Cappuccino	
2020 (24th)	Hubert Wu	The Exorcist's 2nd Meter	
2020 (24th)	Mark Ma	Life After Death	
2020 (24th)	Vincent Wong	Al Cappuccino	
2020 (24th)	Joey Law	Hong Kong Love Stories	
2021 (25th)
2021 (25th)	Kenneth Ma	Kids' Lives Matter	Johnathan Hui Gam-fung
2021 (25th)	Kalok Chow	Come Home Love: Lo and Behold	
2021 (25th)	Luk Wing	AI Romantic	
2021 (25th)	Shaun Tam	Take Two	
2021 (25th)	Hubert Wu	A Love of No Words	
2022 (26th)
2022 (26th)	Kalok Chow	Your Highness	Kei Wai
2022 (26th)	Brian Chu	Your Highness	
2022 (26th)	Tony Hung	Ghost Cleansing Ltd	
2022 (26th)	Andrew Lam	Get on a Flat	
2022 (26th)	Joel Chan	I've Got the Power	

== Records ==
Most wins

Wins	Actor
4	Kenneth Ma

Most top 5 nominations

Nominations	Actor
6	Kenneth Ma
5	Moses Chan
4	Raymond Lam

Age superlatives

Record	Actor	TV drama	Age (in years)
Oldest winner	Benz Hui	Line Walker (2014)	66
Oldest top 5 nominee	Benz Hui	Line Walker (2014)	66
Youngest winner	Kalok Chow	Your Highness (2022)	27
Youngest top 5 nominee	Kalok Chow	Come Home Love: Lo and Behold (2021)	26
Youngest top 5 nominee	Raymond Lam	La Femme Desperado	26

== See also ==
- List of Asian television awards
