= List of TVB dramas in 2011 =

This is a list of serial dramas released by TVB in 2011.

== Top ten drama series in ratings ==
The following is a list of the highest-rated drama series released by TVB in 2011. The list includes premiere week, final week ratings, as well as the average overall count of live Hong Kong viewers (in millions).

Highest-rated drama series of 2011
Rank	English title	Chinese title	Average	Peak	Premiere week	Final week	HK viewers (millions)
1	Forensic Heroes III	法證先鋒III	33	43	31	33	2.09
2	Lives of Omission	潛行狙擊	31	40	29	33	1.97
3	The Rippling Blossom	魚躍在花見	30.6	38	29	32	1.95
4	Curse of the Royal Harem	萬凰之王	30	43	29	31	1.92
5	Ghetto Justice	怒火街頭	29.5	35	28	31	1.89
6	The Other Truth	真相	29	35	28	30	1.86
7	Yes, Sir. Sorry, Sir!	點解阿Sir係阿Sir	29	38	27	31	1.85
8	A Great Way to Care	仁心解碼	29	35	29	27	1.84
9	Grace Under Fire	女拳	29	34	26	31	1.83
10	Only You	Only You 只有您	29	35	28	30	1.83

== Awards ==
Category/Organization	2011 My AOD Favourite Awards 27 November 2011	2011 TVB Anniversary Awards 5 December 2011	16th Asian Television Awards 8 December 2011	StarHub TVB Awards 18 August 2012
Best Drama	Ghetto Justice	Lives of Omission		When Heaven Burns
Best Actor	Kevin Cheng; Ghetto Justice			
Best Actress	Myolie Wu; Curse of the Royal Harem		Charmaine Sheh; Can't Buy Me Love (from 2010)	Myolie Wu; Ghetto Justice
Best Supporting Actor	Raymond Wong Ho-yin; Twilight Investigation (from 2010)	Ben Wong; Lives of Omission	Mak Cheung-ching; No Regrets (from 2010)	—N/a
Best Supporting Actress	Sharon Chan; Ghetto Justice		Fala Chen; No Regrets (from 2010)	—N/a
Most Improved Actor	Vincent Wong; Gun Metal Grey (from 2010)	Jin Au-yeung; Show Me the Happy, Yes, Sir. Sorry, Sir!, Lives of Omission		Raymond Wong Ho-yin; A Great Way to Care, Grace Under Fire, Only You, The Other Truth
Most Improved Actress	Nancy Wu; Gun Metal Grey (from 2010)	Sire Ma; Relic of an Emissary, River of Wine, Men with No Shadows, Curse of the Royal Harem		Selena Li; The Life and Times of a Sentinel

== First line-up ==
These dramas air in Hong Kong from 8:00pm to 8:30pm, Monday to Friday on Jade.

Broadcast	English title (Chinese title)	Eps.	Cast and crew	Theme song(s)	Avg. rating	Genre	Notes	Official website
29 Nov 2010– 18 Mar	Show Me the Happy 依家有喜	80	Poon Ka-tak (producer); Roger Kwok, Bernice Liu, Michelle Yim, Paul Chun, Annie Liu, Benz Hui, Derek Kok	"依家有喜" (Bernice Liu); Insert: "衣不稱身" (Auston Lam)	24	Sitcom	HD format	Official website
21 Mar– 30 Oct	Be Home for Dinner 誰家灶頭無煙火	160	Tsui Yu-on (producer); Elliot Ngok, Jason Chan, Kristal Tin, Stephen Au, Yvonne Lam, Helen Ma, Queenie Chu, Océane Zhu, Becky Lee, Katy Kung	"相處之道" (Ruth Tseng)	24	Sitcom	HD format	Official website
31 Oct– 11 May 2012	Til Love Do Us Lie 結·分@謊情式	139	Kwan Wing-chung (producer); Eddie Cheung, Kiki Sheung, Joyce Tang, Hanjin Tan, Lin Xiawei, Benjamin Yuen, Susan Tse, Bowie Wu	"Right On Time" (Hanjin Tan, Kiki Sheung)	25	Sitcom	HD format	Official website

== Second line-up ==
These dramas air in Hong Kong from 8:30pm to 9:30pm, Monday to Friday on Jade.

Broadcast	English title (Chinese title)	Eps.	Cast and crew	Theme song(s)	Avg. rating	Genre	Notes	Official website
27 Dec 2010– 21 Jan	Home Troopers 居家兵團	20	Lam Chi-wah (producer); Liza Wang, Ha Yu, Kevin Cheng, Bernice Liu, Christine Kuo, Raymond Cho, Vincent Wong, Mandy Wong, Angela Tong	"幸福節奏" (Stephanie Ho)	27	Drama		Official website
24 Jan– 18 Feb	7 Days in Life 隔離七日情	20	Leung Choi-yuen (producer); Steven Ma, Sonija Kwok, Bosco Wong, Patrick Tang, Yuen Wah, Mimi Lo, Joyce Cheng, Koni Lui	"盡快愛" (Bosco Wong)	27	Comedy drama	Copyright notice: 2010.	Official website
21 Feb– 2 Apr	Only You; Only You 只有您	30	Amy Wong (producer); Louise Lee, Yoyo Mung, Kevin Cheng, Kristal Tin, Evergreen Mak	"I Do" (Cherry Ho)	29	Romance	Copyright notice: 2010.	Official website
4 Apr– 13 May	Relic of an Emissary 洪武三十二	30	Wong Wai-sing (producer); Joe Ma, Michael Tse, Kate Tsui, Sammul Chan, Elanne Kong, Joel Chan	Opening: "江山" (Joe Ma); Ending: "我等你" (Michael Tse, Kate Tsui)	27	Historical fiction	HD format	Official website
16 May– 10 Jun	My Sister of Eternal Flower 花花世界花家姐	20	Kwan Wing-chung (producer); Charmaine Sheh, Raymond Lam, Toby Leung, Pierre Ngo	"You Light Up My Life" (Raymond Lam)	27	Comedy drama	Copyright notice: 2010.	Official website
13 Jun– 22 Jul	Wax and Wane 團圓	30	Nelson Cheung (producer); Roger Kwok, Sunny Chan, Ron Ng, Kate Tsui, Lau Siu-ming, Toby Leung, Him Law, Benz Hui, Chow Chung, Derek Kok, Claire Yiu, Oscar Leung, Florence Kwok	"團圓" (Ron Ng); Insert: "半圓" (Kate Tsui)	26	Drama	HD format	Official website
25 Jul– 26 Aug	The Life and Times of a Sentinel 紫禁驚雷	26	Leung Choi-yuen (producer); Steven Ma, Kenneth Ma, Sunny Chan, Power Chan, Selena Li, Natalie Tong, Elaine Yiu, Evergreen Mak, Ching Hor-wai	"變天" (Steven Ma)	27	Historical fiction		Official website
29 Aug– 30 Sep	River of Wine 九江十二坊	25	Wong Wai-sing (producer); Bowie Lam, Sunny Chan, Nancy Sit, Linda Chung, Pierre Ngo, Elena Kong, Sire Ma	"今朝有酒" (Tai Chi)	26	Costume drama		Official website
3 Oct– 28 Oct	Super Snoops 荃加福祿壽探案	20	Kwan Wing-chung (producer); Liza Wang, Louis Yuen, Wong Cho-lam, Johnson Lee	"超低能勁攪笑" (Liza Wang, Louis Yuen, Wong Cho-lam and Johnson Lee)	27	Period drama/Comedy	44th Anniversary Drama	Official website
31 Oct– 4 Dec	Curse of the Royal Harem 萬凰之王	29	Chong Wai-kin (producer); Jessica Hsuan, Myolie Wu, Sunny Chan, Gigi Wong, Nancy Wu, Joel Chan	Opening: "各安天命" (Susanna Kwan); Ending: "天造地設" (Myolie Wu)	31	Historical fiction	Overseas version 31 episodes HD format 44th Anniversary Drama	Official website
6 Dec– 2 Jan 2012	Bottled Passion 我的如意狼君	21	Lee Tim-shing (producer); Niki Chow, Raymond Wong Ho-yin, Elaine Yiu, Katy Kung, Raymond Cho, Claire Yiu, Rebecca Chan	"朝花夕拾" (Teresa Cheung)	29	Period drama	HD format	Official website

== Third line-up ==
These dramas air in Hong Kong from 9:30pm to 10:30pm, Monday to Friday on Jade.

Broadcast	English title (Chinese title)	Eps.	Cast and crew	Theme song(s)	Avg. rating	Genre	Notes	Official website
13 Dec 2010– 7 Jan	Links to Temptation 誘情轉駁	20	Tsui Yu-on (producer); Steven Ma, Fala Chen, Yoyo Mung, Kenny Wong, Johnson Lee, Timmy Hung	"愛情轉駁" (Fala Chen)	28	Drama		Official website
10 Jan– 5 Feb	A Great Way to Care 仁心解碼	20	Marco Law (producer); Alex Fong, Kate Tsui, Raymond Wong Ho-yin, Ram Chiang, Ben Wong	"荒島隔岸" (Juno Mak)	29	Medical drama	Released overseas on June 8, 2009. Copyright notice: 2009.	Official website
7 Feb– 4 Mar	The Rippling Blossom 魚躍在花見	20	Chong Wai-kin (producer); Julian Cheung, Michael Tse, Myolie Wu, Tavia Yeung, Damian Lau	"究竟海有幾深" (Julian Cheung)	30.6	Drama	HD format Copyright notice: 2010.	Official website
7 Mar– 17 Apr	Grace Under Fire 女拳	32	Marco Law (producer); Liu Xuan, Bosco Wong, Kenneth Ma, Fala Chen, David Chiang, Elliot Ngok, Dominic Lam, Raymond Wong Ho-yin	Opening: "刀槍不入" (Elisa Chan); Ending: "回見" (Liu Xuan)	29	Period drama/Martial arts	HD format	Official website
18 Apr– 27 May	Yes, Sir. Sorry, Sir! 點解阿Sir係阿Sir	30	Lau Kar-ho (producer); Moses Chan, Tavia Yeung, Linda Chung, Ron Ng	"春風化雨" (Moses Chan, Ron Ng)	29	Drama		Official website
30 May– 24 Jun	Ghetto Justice 怒火街頭	20	Terry Tong (producer); Kevin Cheng, Myolie Wu, Sam Lee, Alex Lam, Joyce Tang, Sharon Chan, Shek Sau, Eddie Kwan	"沒時間後悔" (Hanjin Tan, Jin Au-yeung)	29.5	Legal drama		Official website
27 Jun– 29 Jul	The Other Truth 真相	25	Amy Wong (producer); Tavia Yeung, Raymond Wong Ho-yin, Ruco Chan, Louis Yuen, Natalie Tong, Lai Lok-yi	"潛伏" (Ryan Lau)	29	Legal drama		Official website
1 Aug– 9 Sep	Lives of Omission 潛行狙擊	30	Chong Wai-kin (producer); Michael Tse, Bosco Wong, Fala Chen, Kate Tsui, Damian Lau, Cheung Kwok-keung, Elena Kong, Ben Wong	Opening: "獨行" (Michael Tse); Ending: "底線" (Bosco Wong)	31	Crime drama	HD format	Official website
12 Sep– 7 Oct	Men with No Shadows 不速之約	20	Poon Ka-tak (producer); Bobby Au-yeung, Raymond Lam, Tavia Yeung, David Chiang, Gigi Wong, Power Chan, Sire Ma	"試煉" (Raymond Lam)	28	Fantasy/Drama		Official website
10 Oct– 20 Nov	Forensic Heroes III 法證先鋒III	30	Mui Siu-ching (producer); Wayne Lai, Maggie Cheung Ho-yee, Kate Tsui, Ron Ng, Aimee Chan, Edwin Siu, Nancy Wu, Ruco Chan	"目擊" (Wayne Lai, Ron Ng)	33	Police procedural	HD format 44th Anniversary Drama	Official website
21 Nov– 1 Jan 2012	When Heaven Burns 天與地	30	Jonathan Chik (producer); Bowie Lam, Moses Chan, Kenny Wong, Charmaine Sheh, Maggie Shiu, Elaine Jin	Opening: "天與地" (Paul Wong); Ending: "年少無知" (Bowie Lam, Moses Chan, Kenny Wong)	25	Drama	HD format. Copyright notice: 2010.	Official website

== Fourth line-up ==
These dramas air in Hong Kong from 10:30pm to 11:00pm, Monday to Friday on Jade.

Broadcast	English title (Chinese title)	Eps.	Cast and crew	Theme song(s)	Avg. rating	Genre	Notes	Official website
7 Feb– 18 Feb	Dropping by Cloud Nine 你們我們他們	10	Ho Siu-wai (producer); Ron Ng, Kate Tsui, Figaro Ceng, Mag Lam, Joel Chan, Macy Chan, Lai Lok-yi, Sherry Chen, Vincent Wong, Elle Lee, Jason Chan, Kaki Leung, Stephanie Ho		20	Romance	Valentine's Day Mini-drama	Official website
