= List of Lives of Omission characters =

Promotional poster. From left to right: Michael So, Paris Yiu, Harry Kung, Jodie Chau and Laughing.

Lives of Omission is a 2011 television crime drama serial set and filmed in Hong Kong. Produced by Television Broadcasts Limited (TVB), Chong Wai-kin serves as the drama's executive producer with Sharon Au and Choi Suk-yin as the executive writers. The drama centers around a squad of undercover officers from the Criminal Intelligence Bureau (CIB) of the Hong Kong Police Force, who are closely following the activities of Yee Fung (義豐), a large triad society. Lives of Omission first broadcast on August 1, 2011 in Hong Kong.

== Criminal Intelligence Bureau ==
=== Harry Kung ===
Damian Lau portrays Harry Kung / Kung Kar-pui (鞏家培), the senior superintendent of CIB.

=== Jodie Chau ===
Fala Chen portrays Jodie Chau / Chau Mong-ching (周望晴), known as Madam Jo, the senior inspector of CIB's A team. She is Laughing Leung's supervisor, later his girlfriend and fiancée. She was shot in the leg in episode 30 by Michael So who pushed her off a ledge to her death. She and Laughing got together in the middle of the series in episode 15.

=== Laughing ===
Michael Tse portrays Leung Siu-tong (梁笑棠), better known as Laughing, the drama's main protagonist. Laughing is the station sergeant CIB's A team, the subgroup in charge of monitoring criminal information and handling informants. Laughing is also responsible for recruiting and training young police officers in undercover work. Lap Ching, Siu-Kit, and Bubble are his students. He was suspended from all police duties in episode 15 for trading ketamine with Michael So in order to save Siu-Kit, but was later reinstated as a UC supervised by Jodie Chau. He is Jodie Chau's subordinate, later her boyfriend and fiancé.

Laughing is an extremely experienced undercover cop having spent most of his career working as an undercover in various triad societies. Prior to the events of Lives of Omission, Laughing spent two years in an illegal armed weaponry gang as a spy for the mainland Chinese police before returning to Hong Kong to work as a UC (undercover) instructor. In order to bust Yee Fung, one of Hong Kong's most powerful triad society, Laughing employs Michael as his informant. He is sentenced to life in prison for murder after he killed Michael to avenge Jodie's death.

=== Dog Head ===
Derek Kok portrays Sze To-Hoi (司徒凱), known as Dog Head (狗頭), the sergeant of CIB's A Team. He is addicted to gambling and is indebted to Yee Fung, so he is forced to help Mok Yat-lit deal with triad matters. He was dismissed by the police in episode 26.

=== Lap Ching ===
Jin Au-Yeung portrays Yeung Lap-ching (楊立青), known as Lap Ching (蠟青; lit. Asphalt), an undercover trainee mentored by Laughing, who is indebted to Mok Yat Lit.

=== Vicky Mung ===
Mandy Wong portrays Vicky / Mung Sam-ling (蒙心凌), known as Ah Mung (阿檬), an undercover trainee mentored by Madam Jo.

=== Young Master Kit ===
Daniel Chau portrays Suen Siu-kit (孙少杰), known as Young Master Kit (杰少), an UC trainee mentored by Laughing, and Fong Chun-Long's younger twin brother. He goes undercover on a mission assigned by Laughing in episode 14, but his identity was revealed when his ear piece was discovered by Michael So. He was injected with poisonous amounts of drugs which led to paralysis by Michael So in episode 15, but he completely recovers and resumes police office work in episode 29.

=== Bubble ===
Bella Lam portrays Lam Po-tim (林寶甜), known as Bubble, an undercover trainee mentored by Laughing.

=== T Two ===
Ronald Law portrays Kwok Ting-tin (郭定天), known as T Two, an UC trainee mentored by Madam Jo. He was later found to be a triad mole placed within CIB by Mok Yat-lit, who was his godfather. He was arrested and dismissed by the police in episode 25.

== Yee Fung triad organisation ==
=== Mok Yat-lit ===
Cheung Kwok-keung portrays Mok Yat-lit (莫一烈), the leader of the Yee Fung triad. He is also the cousin-in-law of Harry Kung. He was killed under orders from Michael So and another triad senior, Choy Hing Fat in episode 23, when Michael tries to seize the power and influence he held within Yee Fung.

=== Lat Keung ===
Ben Wong portrays Tang Kwok-ban (鄧國彬), better known as Lat Keung (辣薑; lit. Spicy Ginger), one of Mok Yat-Lit's best assistants in the triad. He is later revealed to be an UC cop supervised by Harry Kung, but later renegades the latter. He was charged for setting fire to Yee Fung's red oil yard, almost killing Laughing, but was found not guilty of attempted murder in episode 23. He was killed by the police in episode 29 in a shootout.

=== Michael So ===
Bosco Wong portrays Michael So / So Sing-pak (蘇星柏), better known as Bai Co (跛Co; lit. Crippled Co) or Wai Co (威Co; lit. Dignified Co), Laughing's informant. Michael grew up in a privileged household and went to a prestigious private school. Before Michael finished high school, his father's business failed and his father committed suicide by setting his house on fire, killing all his family members except Michael. Since then, Michael joined Yee Fung. Michael is cunning, patient, and calculative, waiting for any sort of possibility to "move up" in the triad. Michael's obvious ambitions angered his leader, who later slipped information to the police of Michael's illegal drug trafficking business. As a result, Michael spent several years in jail.

After he is released from prison, Michael returns to Yee Fung and briefly works in the triad's funeral business. He meets Laughing and becomes his informant after Laughing promises Michael that he will help him move up in the triad. Michael gets into trouble with Laughing in episode 10 when he was arrested by Laughing for fatally running over Wai-lei, but was later released with the help of his girlfriend, Paris.

Michael and Paris Yiu have been dating since they were sixteen. After Michael and Paris graduated high school, Michael helped pay for Paris' law school expenses even after he joined Yee Fung. After Paris achieved a barrister license, she breaks up with Michael, wanting to end relations with him as well as to pursue her own ambitions and establish her career as a well-known and respected barrister.

In episode 30, he was shot and killed by Laughing in revenge for Jodie's death.

=== Fire Dragon ===
Adrian Chau portrays Fong Chun-lung (方俊龍), better known as Fire Dragon (火龍), is a newcomer to the Yee Fung triad and Suen Siu-Kit's older twin brother. After Suen Siu-Kit was seriously injured by Michael So, Fong decides to quit Yee Fung and stays with Kit.

== Other characters ==
=== Paris Yiu ===
Kate Tsui portrays Paris Yiu / Yiu Ho-ho (姚可可), a barrister novice. She was born in a jail and takes offense of her family background. Paris and Michael have been dating since they were sixteen, and after graduating from high school, Michael helped pay for her law school tuition. After Michael was sentenced to several years in prison for illegal drug trafficking, Paris decides to end relations with him, but finds it hard to forget about him completely. They have an on-again and off-again relationship that resumes following her miscarriage of his baby in episode 27. Michael proposes to her and they wed in episode 29.

She pretended to have a sexual relationship with her mentor, Fung Ying-Kui, to further advance her career as a barrister.

In episode 29, she was later shot and "killed" by Michael in front of triad leaders, after she was found in possession of incriminating information that involved the drug operations of Ether Union as well personal information about its members. However, she was born with a strange condition that her heart is on the right side. Michael deliberately shot the left side of her body in order not to kill her.

=== Yuen Kwan-nam ===
Elena Kong portrays Yuen Kwan-nam (袁君嵐), an ex-convict who was sentenced to twenty years in prison. Before she went to jail, she was once the respected former wife of the leader of a large triad organization and briefly dated Harry Kung, who was an undercover working within the triad at the time. She later reconciles with Harry and enters into a romantic relationship with him.

== Minor characters ==
- Poon Fong-fong as Mok Fong-kei (莫芳琪), Harry's wife, Aidan's mother, Mok Yat-lit and Mok Wai-kei's cousin. She died from cancer in episode 9.
- Tat Dik as Kung Lok-kan / Aidan (鞏樂勤), Harry's teenage son.
- Mary Hon as Ho Sau-mei / Sophie (何秀美), Madam Jo's mother. She is an insurance sales executive.
- Lily Leung as Chan Sam-mui (陳三妹), Paris' grandmother.
- Yu Yang as Fung Ying-kui (馮應駒), Paris' mentor and Mok Yak-Lit's barrister. He had a sexual relationship with Paris.
- Lam King-kong as Cheung Tat-kiu (張達橋), known as Tat Q (撻Q), Yuen Kwan-Nam's ex-follower and good friend.
- Griselda Yeung as Joyce

=== Police ===
- Mak Ka-lun as Officer Cheung Man-bor (章文波), known as Bunny, leader of CIB's monitoring team.
- Summer Joe as Officer Helen Tam Hoi-lun (譚海倫), CIB's liaison.
- Hugo Wong as Inspector Wong Chi-king (汪子勁), inspector of the Organized Crime and Triad Bureau (OCTB).
- Ko Chun-man as Inspector Hui Tsan-hung (許振雄), inspector of CIB's hit team.
- Joey Law as Officer Pang Kwan-ming (彭鈞銘), known as Husky (雪橇), member of CIB's surveillance team.
- Calinda Chan as Wong Miu-fan (王妙芬), known as Pug (八哥; lit. Brother Eight), member of CIB's surveillance team.
- Ho Chun-hin as Chik Chi-ting (戚梓庭), known as Shar Pei (沙皮), member of CIB's surveillance team.

=== Triad members ===
- Peter Lai as Lee Yiu-kan (李耀根), one of the elder council members of Yee Fung. He speaks Shundenese dialect (a kind of native Cantonese in Shunde, Guangdong). He was killed by poisoning by Michael So in episode 26.
- Leung Kin-ping as Mok Wai-lei / Willy (莫威利), Mok's first cousin and a member of Yee Fung. He was knocked down by a van and killed by Michael So in episode 10.
- Dai Yiu-ming as Fu Luk / Fluke (符碌), a member of Yee Fung who helps organizes the triad's funeral businesses. He was killed by Mok Yat-lit in episode 20.
- Kelvin Leung as Wu Chi-yin (胡志賢), one of Fu Luk's followers.
- Candy Yuen as Ting Man (丁敏), Mok Yat Lit's mistress. She was arrested by the police in episode 23. Since she changed to be state witness and accused Yee Fung of being a triad, she was finally dismissed from the lawsuit.

== See also ==
- Lives of Omission
