= Lives of Omission =

- Official poster
- Also known as: Salute Laughing Sir

Chinese name
- Traditional Chinese: 潛行狙擊
- Simplified Chinese: 潜行狙击
- Literal meaning: "Sneak Attack"
Transcriptions
Standard Mandarin
- Hanyu Pinyin: Qián Xíng Jú Ji
Yue: Cantonese
- Jyutping: Cim4 Hang4 Zeoi1 Gik1
- Genre: Crime thriller Action
- Screenplay by: Cat Kwan; Yip Tin-shing; Lai Sin-yee; Chan Ka-wang; Chiu Mei-yee; Cheung Ying-wai; Cheung Chung-chai; Wong Siu-lung
- Directed by: So Man-chung; Chung Kwok-keung; Lee Kin-wo; Lam Chi-yan; Yip Chun-fai
- Starring: Michael Tse; Bosco Wong; Fala Chen; Kate Tsui; Damian Lau
- Opening theme: Walking Alone (獨行) by Michael Tse (Also the ending theme in even numbers episodes)
- Ending theme: Dai Sin (底線) by Bosco Wong (In odd numbers episodes)
- Composer: Yip Kai-chung
- Country of origin: Hong Kong
- Original language: Cantonese
- No. of episodes: 30

Production
- Producer: Chong Wai-kin
- Production location: Hong Kong
- Camera setup: Multi camera
- Production company: TVB

Original release
- Network: Jade; HD Jade
- Release: 1 August – 9 September 2011

Related
- Turning Point 2 (2011); E.U. (2009); Turning Point (2009)

Lives of Omission is a 2011 Hong Kong action crime thriller television series produced by TVB under executive producer Chong Wai-kin. The drama is a spin-off of TVB's successful television crime drama E.U. and a distant sequel to the 2009 film Turning Point, and stars Michael Tse reprising his role as "Laughing Gor." Lives of Omission premiered on 1 August 2011 and ended on 9 September 2011 with a total of 30 episodes. It is Hong Kong's second highest-rating serial drama of 2011, and won Best Drama at the 2011 TVB Anniversary Awards.

Lives of Omission takes places two years after the events of E.U., and centers on a squad of undercover officers from the Criminal Intelligence Bureau (CIB) of the Hong Kong Police Force, who are closely following the activities of Yee Fung (義豐), a large triad society. Experienced undercover officer Laughing (Tse), a station sergeant of CIB, promises to help gangster Michael (Bosco Wong) move up the ranks within the triad under the circumstance that he works as Laughing's informant.

== Plot ==
Series intertitle

Laughing (Michael Tse), who presumably died during the events of E.U., used his death as a cover to perform a long term undercover mission in Dongguan, China. After completing his mission, Laughing returns to Hong Kong where CIB's senior superintendent, Harry Kung (Damian Lau), recruits him into his department to become team leader and teacher to new police recruits. On Laughing's very first day, he encounters a woman that greatly resembles his former lover, Karen (from Turning Point); she is Laughing's new commander and second lead in CIB, Senior Inspector Jodie Chau (both played by Fala Chen). Together, their assignment is to recruit and train rookies in the art of undercover and espionage. However, things do not go as smoothly as desired.

Laughing exhibits an unprofessional attitude in CIB headquarters and does many things without informing his fellow agents; it often causes everyone to question his motives. While recruiting for new agents, he manages to reserve one agent for himself to choose. He ultimately chooses Lap Ching (Jin), a talented, but problematic rookie under his wing. With their team assembled, they begin training them in the art of undercover police investigation and the methods of the trade.

For years, the CIB has been trying to crack down one of Hong Kong's largest triad organizations, Yee Fung. As both a means of training and to investigate against Yee Fung, Laughing and Jodie have their rookies investigate Lat Keung (Spicy Ginger, Ben Wong). To further dig deeper into Yee Fung's operations, Lap Ching was sent in as a low-level gang and pimp to feed CIB information about one of Yee Fung's major figureheads. In between this time, Laughing chooses to work with Michael So (Bosco Wong), a crippled low-level gangster in Yee Fung. Seeing his ambition, Laughing and Michael have a mutual manipulative relationship to help each other benefit in their respective situations. Ultimately, the operation is considered a success as they detain and charge many of Lat Keung's group in illegal prostitution and racketeering. In the process, Michael rises within the ranks of Yee Fung and gains notoriety.

The results of the mission do not sit well with Laughing as he knows Michael went behind his back and did many things to help himself rise; unfortunately, even with Laughing's skills, he can not take down Michael. Using his intellect, Michael quickly rises higher and eventually leads his own group within Yee Fung. Using the power of the internet, he creates new inventive ways to sell drugs at a record pace without HKPD interference.

Laughing tried to get another rookie go undercover in attempt to stop Michael, but the process leaves his agent brain damaged and reduced to a wheelchair for the rest of his life. In order to stop Yee Fung, Laughing agrees to become an undercover agent for a fourth time. Using his frustration over his rookie's demise as a ploy, Laughing creates a situation where his behavior could no longer be tolerated by the HKPD and have him kicked out and even sent to jail. All of this drama was to establish his washed-up credibility to be considered by Yee Fung.

Not long after, Yee Fung's leader, the Dragon Head, Mok Yat-lit (Cheung Kwok-keung), noticed Laughing's talents and recruited him as his new star member. Working alongside Michael, the duo begin to gain territories and investments at record levels that impresses all of Yee Fung. In between undercover work, Laughing and Jodie become romantically involved. Being Laughing's handler, Jodie tries to keep their relationship professional, but Laughing doesn't make it easy for her. In order to dig in deeper for dirt on Mok Yat-lit, Laughing wins the heart of Mok Yat-lit's mistress, Ting Man, to discover his secret cocaine stash. However, to their surprise, Mok Yat-lit escapes capture because he has planted a mole within CIB.

Ultimately, Mok Yat-lit is sent to jail. Under the advice of his lawyers, he manipulates his mistress to take the fall for the bulk of his recent crimes and he agrees to plead guilty under lesser charges for a few months in jail. However, even in jail, Mok Yat-lit's influence on Yee Fung still remains strong. Sensing the ambitious nature of Michael, he has one of his lieutenants kill Michael; ironically, the lieutenant sides with Michael and has him killed in a jail shower. After his death, Michael wins the election and becomes the new Dragon Head of Yee Fung.

After gaining control of Yee Fung, Michael sets his sights to greater goals by joining a secret black organization: Ether Union. Ether Union is a group of influential businessmen who share their resources together to mutually gain greater riches than either could've done individually. Ether Union fell as Laughing's interventions eventually leads to the downfall of both Ether Union and Yee Fung. The majority of the Ether Union members escape, but they were all suspicious of Michael as one of them received information from a police mole that Michael had incriminating evidence against them in his home. To prevent further doubt, Michael blames all of the accusations on his wife, Paris (Kate Tsui). He shoots her and throws her body in the water to prevent further doubt. However, all of the Ether Union members were eventually tracked and arrested, except for Michael.

During a confrontation with Michael, Jodie is held as a hostage in an industrial building. When the members of Ether Union were arrested, their utility rings were also confiscated. These rings contained an alarm system as well as a laser decoder that flashed the numbers of a secret account containing vast riches. With all except Michael arrested, Michael is left with sole access to the secret account. The hostage situation doesn't go well; Michael has to flee, but he flings Jodie over the hangar to her death. Enraged with her death, Laughing lures Michael out and kills him by shooting him in the chest. After the police arrive, Laughing is arrested and found guilty of murder. For his crime, he is jailed for life.

After these occurrences, Kung-sir retired from his position as superintendent for CIB. Lap Ching would become a decorated CIB agent and returned to the undercover life. It was revealed that Paris's death was faked. In a letter, Michael explained that their ploy to gain control of Ether Union could've been too much if exposed; the only way to gain trust was to fake her death. Paris had secretly hidden herself in a country house for an unknown period of time to avoid the lash of Ether Union.

Laughing continues to live out his life sentence in jail, but under the hateful watch of criminals he helped incarcerate. Laughing's story continues on in the events of Turning Point II.

== Cast and characters ==
- Michael Tse as Laughing / SSGT66715 Leung Siu-tong (梁笑棠), the station sergeant of CIB. Before joining CIB in 2011, Laughing worked as an undercover for many years in different triad organisations.
- Bosco Wong as Michael "Crippled Co" So (蘇星柏; So Sing-pak), Laughing's informant and later Dragon Head of the Yee Fung triad.
- Fala Chen as WSIP Jodie "Madam Jo" Chau (周望晴; Chau Mong-ching), the senior inspector of CIB and Laughing's girlfriend later fiance.
- Kate Tsui as Paris Yiu (姚可可; Yiu Ho-ho), a barrister novice and Michael's girlfriend.
- Damian Lau as SSP Harry Kung (鞏家培; Kung Kar-pui), the senior superintendent of CIB.
- Elena Kong as Yuen Kwan-lam (袁君嵐), an ex-convict who was sentenced to twenty years of prison.
- Ben Wong as Lat Keung (Spicy Ginger) / Tang Kwok-ban (辣薑 / 鄧國彬), one of the leaders and member of the Yee Fung triad. An undercover Superintendent under Harry Kung.
- Cheung Kwok-keung as Mok Yat-lit (莫一烈), the Dragon Head of the Yee Fung triad.
- Derek Kok as Dog Head / Sergeant Szeto Hoi (狗頭; Gau Tau / 司徒凱), a CIB sergeant.
- Jin Au-yeung as Lap Ching (Asphalt) / PC Yeung Lap-ching (蠟青 / 楊立青), an undercover trainee mentored by Laughing.
- Mandy Wong as WPC Vicky "Ah Mung" Mung (阿檬 / 蒙心凌), an undercover trainee mentored by Madam Jo.
- Daniel Chau as Young Master Kit / PC Suen Siu-kit (杰少; Kit Siu / 孫少杰), an undercover trainee mentored by Laughing, Fong Chun-long's younger twin brother.
- Bella Lam as Bubble / WPC Lam Po-tim (林寶甜), an undercover trainee mentored by Laughing.
- Ronald Law as T Two / PC Kwok Ting-tin (郭定天), an undercover trainee mentored by Madam Jo.
- Adrian Chau as Fire Dragon / Fong Chun-long (火龍; Fo Lung / 方俊龍), a new member of the Yee Fung triad, Suen Siu-kit's older twin brother.
- Det Dik as Aidan Kung (鞏樂勤; Kung Lok-kan), Harry's teenage son who is also a dancer.
- Candy Yuen as Ting Man (丁敏), Mok Yat-lit's mistress.
- Mary Hon as Ho Sau-mei (何秀美), Madam Jo's mother.

== Production ==
A costume fitting was held on 7 March 2011 at Tseung Kwan O TVB City Studio One at 12:30 pm. and filming started on 21 March and wrapped up on 5 July where a hot pot banquet was held in Senfuku located in Tsim Sha Tsui at 8:30 pm.

== Reception ==
=== Viewership ratings ===
The following is a table that includes a list of the total ratings points based on television viewership. "Viewers in millions" refers to the number of people, derived from Jade ratings (including HD Jade), in Hong Kong who watched the episode live. The peak number of viewers are in brackets.

Week	Episode(s)	Average points	Peaking points	Viewers in millions (peak)	References
1	1 — 5	29	33	1.85 (2.11)	
2	6 — 10	30	34	1.91 (2.17)	
3	11 — 15	30	33	1.91 (2.11)	
4	16 — 19	31	33	1.98 (2.11)	
5	20 — 24	31	34	1.98 (2.17)	
6	25 — 30	33	40	2.10 (2.55)	
6	29 — 30	35	40	2.23 (2.55)	

=== Accolades ===
Year	Award	Category	Recipient	Result	Top 5
2011	Ming Pao Anniversary Awards 2011	Outstanding Programme	Lives of Omission	Nominated	
2011	Ming Pao Anniversary Awards 2011	Outstanding Actor in Television	Michael Tse	Nominated	
2011	Ming Pao Anniversary Awards 2011	Outstanding Actor in Television	Bosco Wong	Nominated	
2011	Ming Pao Anniversary Awards 2011	Outstanding Actress in Television	Kate Tsui	Nominated	
2011	Ming Pao Anniversary Awards 2011	Outstanding Actress in Television	Fala Chen	Nominated	
2011	Ming Pao Anniversary Awards 2011	Outstanding Crew in Television	Chong Wai-kin	Nominated	
2011	My AOD Favourites Awards	My Favourite Drama Series	Lives of Omission	Nominated	Entered
2011	My AOD Favourites Awards	My Favourite Actor in a Leading Role	Michael Tse	Nominated	Entered
2011	My AOD Favourites Awards	My Favourite Actor in a Leading Role	Bosco Wong	Nominated	—
2011	My AOD Favourites Awards	My Favourite Actress in a Leading Role	Fala Chen	Nominated	Entered
2011	My AOD Favourites Awards	My Favourite Actor in a Supporting Role	Damian Lau	Nominated	Entered
2011	My AOD Favourites Awards	My Favourite Actor in a Supporting Role	Ben Wong	Nominated	Entered
2011	My AOD Favourites Awards	My Favourite Actor in a Supporting Role	Cheung Kwok-keung	Nominated	—
2011	My AOD Favourites Awards	My Favourite Promising Actress	Mandy Wong	Nominated	
2011	My AOD Favourites Awards	My Favourite On Screen Couple	Michael Tse and Fala Chen	Won	Entered
2011	My AOD Favourites Awards	My Favourite On Screen Couple	Bosco Wong and Kate Tsui	Nominated	Entered
2011	My AOD Favourites Awards	My Favourite Drama Theme Song	Michael Tse	Won	
2011	My AOD Favourites Awards	My Favourite Top 15 Drama Characters	Michael Tse	Won	
2011	My AOD Favourites Awards	My Favourite Top 15 Drama Characters	Bosco Wong	Won	
2011	My AOD Favourites Awards	My Favourite Top 15 Drama Characters	Fala Chen	Won	
2011	TVB Anniversary Awards	Best Drama	Lives of Omission	Won	Entered
2011	TVB Anniversary Awards	Best Actor	Michael Tse	Nominated	Entered
2011	TVB Anniversary Awards	Best Actor	Bosco Wong	Nominated	Entered
2011	TVB Anniversary Awards	Best Actress	Fala Chen	Nominated	Entered
2011	TVB Anniversary Awards	Best Actress	Kate Tsui	Nominated	—
2011	TVB Anniversary Awards	Best Supporting Actor	Ben Wong	Won	Entered
2011	TVB Anniversary Awards	Best Supporting Actor	Derek Kok	Nominated	Entered
2011	TVB Anniversary Awards	Best Supporting Actress	Elena Kong	Nominated	—
2011	TVB Anniversary Awards	My Favourite Male Character	Michael Tse	Nominated	Entered
2011	TVB Anniversary Awards	My Favourite Male Character	Bosco Wong	Nominated	Entered
2011	TVB Anniversary Awards	My Favourite Male Character	Jin Au-yeung	Nominated	—
2011	TVB Anniversary Awards	My Favourite Female Character	Fala Chen	Nominated	Entered
2011	TVB Anniversary Awards	My Favourite Female Character	Kate Tsui	Nominated	—
2011	TVB Anniversary Awards	Most Improved Male Artiste	Jin Au-yeung	Won	
2011	TVB Anniversary Awards	Most Improved Female Artiste	Mandy Wong	Nominated	
2011	Youku Drama Awards	Top 10 Dramas of the Year	Lives of Omission	Won	
2011	Youku Drama Awards	Best Actor of the Year — HK/Taiwan	Michael Tse	Won	
2011	Youku Drama Awards	Best Actress of the Year — HK/Taiwan	Fala Chen	Nominated	

== Sequel ==
A direct film sequel to this drama, titled Turning Point 2 (《Laughing Gor之潛罪犯》) started filming in October. Tse will continue to reprise his role, whereas Wong and Chen, whose characters both died, may return in cameo roles. Veteran actor Francis Ng has also been confirmed to join the film. Miss Hong Kong 2011 winner Rebecca Zhu will play the female lead. Wong, Tsui and Au-yeung will also participate in the film whereas Chen, due to the death of her character, will not take part. New cast members include Chapman To, Kara Hui, Janice Man, Liu Kai-chi, King Kong Lee, Ram Chiang and Lau Siu Ming. The premiere of the film was held on 19 December and was theatrically released on 29 December 2011.

== See also ==
- The Academy (franchise)
- Turning Point (2009 Hong Kong film)
- Turning Point 2
