= Whatever Will Be, Will Be (1997 film) =

1997 Hong Kong film by Barry Chu

- VCD cover
- Traditional Chinese: 迷失樂園
- Simplified Chinese: 迷失乐园
- Hanyu Pinyin: Mí Shī Lè Yuán
- Jyutping: Mai4 Sat1 Lok6 Jyun4
- Directed by: Barry Chu
- Written by: Ngau Pat; Manny Luk
- Produced by: Benny Chan
- Starring: Michael Tse; Teresa Mak; Danny Summer; Stephen Ho; Lanna Wong; Joanna Chan
- Cinematography: Venus Keung
- Edited by: Grand Yip
- Music by: Patrick Kwok; Mok Hau Wan Ka
- Production company: Keen Pearl International
- Distributed by: Golden Harvest
- Release date: 6 November 1997
- Country: Hong Kong
- Language: Cantonese

Whatever Will Be, Will Be is a 1997 Hong Kong erotic drama film directed by Barry Chu and starring Michael Tse and Teresa Mak. The film was rated Category III by the Hong Kong motion picture rating system.

== Cast ==
- Michael Tse
- Teresa Mak
- Danny Summer
- Stephen Ho
- Lanna Wong
- Joanna Chan
- Cheung Hung-on
- Law San-wing
- H Yuen-ngai
- Lam Wai-ling
- Hui Sze-man
