= I.C. Kill =

1999 Hong Kong film by Mihiel Wong

- VHS cover
- Traditional Chinese: 網上怪談之兇靈對話
- Simplified Chinese: 网上怪谈之凶灵对话
- Hanyu Pinyin: Wǎng Shàng Guài Tán Zhì Xiōng Líng Duì Huà
- Jyutping: Mong5 Seong3 Gwaai3 Taam4 Zi1 Hung1 Ling4 Deoi3 Wa6
- Directed by: Mihiel Wong
- Written by: Andrew Wu
- Produced by: Takkie Yeung
- Starring: Michael Tse; Liz Kong; Jason Chu; Wan Yeung-ming
- Cinematography: Ng Wing-din; Lau Wai-kwan
- Edited by: Wong Wing-kai
- Music by: Simon Leung
- Production companies: B&S Limited
- Distributed by: B&S Films Distribution Company Limited
- Release date: 24 September 1999
- Running time: 73 minutes
- Country: Hong Kong
- Language: Cantonese

I.C. Kill is a 1999 Hong Kong horror film directed by Mihiel Wong and starring Michael Tse and Liz Kong. This film features realistic presentations of the internet.

== Plot ==
Jim (Michael Tse) and Roy are friends living together. Jim has recently broken up with his girlfriend and decides to meet new girls through a social networking website ICQ. There, he meets a girl Hiroko (Liz Kong) and they become friends.

Both Jim and Roy find Hiroko attractive and Roy plans to have a one-night stand with her. He uses Jim's ICQ account and asks Hiroko out where then they meet in Ma Liu Shui. However, Roy never comes back from his meeting with Hiroko and is later found dead.

This case is handled by Inspector Lau. Hiroko is the prime suspect but there is no evidence. Lau begins to track down old files and ends up finding something very shocking.

== Cast ==
- Michael Tse as Jim Cheung
- Liz Kong as Hiroko
- Jason Chu as Roy Lung
- Wan Yeung-ming as Inspector Lau
- Kenny Lam as Dee
- Chan Wing-leung
