= Turning Point 2 =

2011 Hong Kong film by Herman Yau

- Singapore film poster

Chinese name
- Traditional Chinese: Laughing Gor之潛罪犯
- Simplified Chinese: Laughing Gor之潜罪犯
Transcriptions
Standard Mandarin
- Hanyu Pinyin: Laughing Gor Zhì Qián Zuì Fàn
Yue: Cantonese
- Jyutping: Laughing Gor Zi1 Cim4 Zeoi6 Faan2
- Directed by: Herman Yau
- Written by: Sharon Au; Yip Tin-shing; Lai Sin-yee
- Produced by: Tommy Leung
- Starring: Michael Tse; Francis Ng; Chapman To; Bosco Wong; Kara Hui; Kate Tsui; Janice Man
- Cinematography: Joe Chan
- Edited by: Azrael Chung
- Music by: Mak Chun Hung
- Production companies: Shaw Brothers Studio; Television Broadcasts Limited
- Distributed by: Intercontinental Film Distributors (HK)
- Release date: 29 December 2011
- Running time: 89 minutes
- Country: Hong Kong
- Language: Cantonese

Turning Point 2 is a 2011 Hong Kong action crime thriller film directed by Herman Yau and starring Michael Tse in the title role of "Laughing Gor" and co-starring Francis Ng, Chapman To and Bosco Wong. The film is a distant sequel to the 2009 film Turning Point, a direct sequel to the 2011 TV series Lives of Omission and the third spin-off of The Academy franchise featuring Tse's character from E.U.

== Plot ==
Towards the end of TVB series, Lives of Omission <潛行狙擊>, “Laughing Gor” Michael Tse was sentenced to life imprisonment after murdering Bosco Wong's (黃宗澤) character. In prison, Laughing met Francis Ng (吳鎮宇), a university professor imprisoned for drug possession. Despite the professor's gentle and aloof exterior, he was a vicious, cold-blooded criminal. Furthermore, the professor was a criminal psychologist able to discern other people's inner secrets and dark side. Due to such abilities, the professor was able to silently control others. At this time, a mysterious woman, who worked for high-level Security Police unit, visited Laughing in prison. Laughing's imprisonment was spurred by his role in an undercover assignment. It turned out that another person was responsible for Bosco Wong's character's death. Suspecting that the incident involved a corrupt police force, the Deputy Secretary for Security Police assigned Laughing to investigate the case while posing as an inmate.

== Cast ==
=== Main cast ===
- Michael Tse as Leung Siu-tong (梁笑棠), nicknamed Laughing Gor (Laughing哥), prisoner 76133, the main protagonist of the film, a former station sergeant (SGT66715) of the Criminal Intelligence Bureau (CIB) who was sent by Security Security Bureau Undersecretary Lai Cheuk-yin to go undercover in Stanley Prison to retrieve a list of corrupt cops.
- Francis Ng as Fok Tin-yam (霍天任), prisoner 77015, the main antagonist of the film, a university professor and criminal psychologist who is the mastermind who manipulated the corrupt cops, hoping to start a revolution.
- Chapman To as Tai Chit ((大切)), prisoner 74635, a former station sergeant of the Narcotics Bureau who feigns mental disorder to cover his identity as one of Fok's followers.
- Bosco Wong as Michael So (蘇星柏), nicknamed Crippled Co (跛Co), the main leader of Yee Fung Triad and Laughing's nemesis who was seemingly killed by Laughing during the events of Lives of Omission, while in reality, So was killed by Tai Chit, who was formulated by Fok Tin-yam to do so.
- Kara Hui as Sa Po-yau (沙普邱), a drug dealer from the Golden Triangle who colludes with Fok Tin-yam.
- Kate Tsui as Paris Yiu (姚可可), a former barrister and girlfriend of Michael So. Due to the death of her boyfriend, she suffers from posttraumatic stress disorder and becomes Fok Tin-yam's patient.
- Janice Man as Carmen, the Executive Officer of the Security Bureau who is Laughing's contact person, while in actuality, she is a spy working for Fok Tin-yam. Despite so, she is in love Laughing and sacrifices her life to save him.

=== Other cast ===
- Liu Kai-chi as Cheuk King-chuen (卓景全), the corrupt Deputy Commissioner of the Hong Kong Police Force who is also one of Fok Tin-yam's students and ascending Commissioner of the Hong Kong Police at the end of the movie.
- Evergreen Mak Cheung-ching as Lai Cheuk-yin (黎卓賢), the Undersecretary of the Security Security Bureau who plants Laughing undercover in prison to retrieve a list of corrupt cops.
- Lam Suet as Kui Chuen (巨川), prisoner 75312.
- King Kong Lee as Nidaime (二代目), prisoner 69248.
- Jin Au-yeung as Yeung Lap-ching (楊立青), Laughing's apprentice who was a constable of CIB, and is now a second class prison officer in Stanley Prison
- Ram Chiang as Officer Sing (醒Sir), a first class prison officer in Stanley Prison
- Lau Siu-ming as Ye Po (耶波), prisoner 58318, Sa Po-yau's father who opposes his daughter's collusion with corrupt cops.
- Rebecca Zhu as Miss Choi (蔡小姐), Fok Tin-yam's girlfriend who testifies in favor of him in court, prompting to be released without charge.

== Production ==
A blessing ceremony for the film was held on 29 October 2011 at Tseung Kwan O TVB City Second Floor Garden at 2:00PM where filming started. The premier of the film was held on 19 December and was released theatrically on 29 December.
