= Leung Choi-yuen =

Hong Kong television director (1950–2026)

- 梁材遠
- Born: December 7, 1950; British Hong Kong
- Died: July 25, 2026 (aged 75); Sha Tin, Hong Kong
- Education: Hong Kong Baptist College
- Occupation: Television producer
- Years active: 1975–2026

Leung Choi-yuen (Chinese: 梁材遠; December 7, 1950 – July 25, 2026), also known as Uncle Choi (材叔), was a Hong Kong television producer and production manager for the drama production department at TVB.

== Life and career ==
Leung Choi-yuen was born in British Hong Kong on December 7, 1950. He attended Salesian School and met Gordon Liu as his classmate on Grade 6. He graduated at Salesian English School in 1970. In 1975, he graduated with a Master of Arts in History from Hong Kong Baptist College.

In 1975, he joined Hong Kong's TVB as a trainee scriptwriter and researcher for Enjoy Yourself Tonight, subsequently joining RTV and CTV as a drama director. In 1978, he returned to TVB and served as a director for television series such as The Good, the Bad and the Ugly and The Bund. In 1985, he was promoted to producer, producing the youth drama Form 4 Class D, which won a Bronze Award at the New York Festivals. He produced many topical dramas, including The Oath of Loyalty, The Road to Victory, and The Return of the Pom Pom. Among them, The Oath of Loyalty, created in collaboration with Wai Ka-fai, however, because the plot touched upon police corruption, it drew protests from government authorities, resulting in the Hong Kong Television and Entertainment Licensing Authority issuing a fine and warning to TVB.

In 1991, Leung joined ATV as a producer under a per-episode contract, through the introduction of Pamela Peck, and filmed Recreating Prosperity and The Rich and Powerful. In 1995, he returned to TVB and was promoted to production manager of the drama production team. He planned dramas such as Plain Love, Tea is from the Hometown, and Country Spirit. In 2004, he returned to the position of producer. His style changed to producing low-budget TV dramas with warm ethics. The themes were diversified, including Steps, A Journey Called Life, A Watchdog's Tale, When Lanes Merge, 7 Days in Life, as well as dramatic costume dramas, including Land of Wealth, The Life and Times of a Sentinel, The Greatness of a Hero, and Kingmaker.

Leung died at the Prince of Wales Hospital in Sha Tin, on July 25, 2026, at the age of 75.
