= The Money-Maker Recipe =

- Promo poster
- 師奶股神
- Genre: Modern Drama
- Starring: Kiki Sheung; Michael Tse; Dominic Lam; Joyce Tang; Angela Tong; Toby Leung; Leanne Li; Ellesmere Choi
- Ending theme: "十優生" by Kay Tse
- Country of origin: Hong Kong
- Original language: Cantonese
- No. of episodes: 21

Production
- Running time: 45 minutes (approx.)

Original release
- Network: TVB
- Release: May 26 – June 20, 2008

The Money-Maker Recipe (Traditional Chinese: 師奶股神) is a TVB modern drama series broadcast in May 2008.

== Synopsis ==
"HOUSEWIVES" always are the good long term bets compared to the other options.

Wong Chi-Chung (Michael Tse) is a stockbroker who is too timid to take risks and not wise enough. This caused many of his customers to switch to a new security firm which has newly opened in the same housing estate. The new firm is managed by a top broker, Ting Shiu-King (Dominic Lam), who is tricky and manipulative. He is assisted by his partner, Koo Ka-Chun (Joyce Tang). He then comes up with a plan to expand his customer base by developing the housewives market. He exploits Chung's wife Tseung Yu-Chu (Kiki Sheung) to carry out his plan by feeding her with information about the stock market. Chu trusts him and therefore follows his advice blindly. She earns a lot of money through King's information and influences all the other housewives to follow her lead.

Chung is unhappy that his wife is being exploited and discourages Chu to indulge in stock market. Chu refuses to listen and Chung becomes resentful. The market suddenly drops drastically causing the housewives to lose large amounts of money. Chu turns over a new leaf by working multiple jobs to repay her debt and hoping to reconcile with Chung. Unfortunately, Chun and King has set a trap to frame Chung. Chu, being an extraordinary housewife decides to bounce back and gets ready to strive against the villainy in order to save her husband. The plot mainly becomes a story about small community versus big corporation.

== Cast ==
| Cast | Role | Description |
|---|---|---|
| Michael Tse | Wong Chi-Chung (黃子聰) | Stock Broker; Tseung Yu-Chu's husband. Koo Ka-Chun's ex-boyfriend. |
| Kiki Sheung | Tseung Yu-Chu (蔣如珠) | Housewife; Wong Chi Chung's wife. Tseung Yu-Bo's older sister. |
| Angela Tong | Tseung Yu-Bo (蔣如寶) | Tseung Yu-Chu's younger sister. |
| Dominic Lam | Ting Shiu-King (King Sir) (丁兆景) | Stock Broker; Koo Ka-Chun's lover. Ting Shiu-Tim older brother. |
| Joyce Tang | Koo Ka-Chun (Janet) (顧家珍) | Stock Broker; Wong Chi-Chung's ex-girlfriend. Ting Shiu-King's lover. |
| Toby Leung | Mo Ying-Shan (毛穎珊) | Ting Shiu-Tim's lover. |
| Ellesmere Choi | Ting Shiu-Tim 丁兆添 | Hair Stylist; Mo Ying-Shan's lover. Ting Shiu-King's younger brother. |
| Law Lok Lam (羅樂林) | Szeto Luen Fai (司徒聯輝) | Head of all finance Szeto Hui-Sam's father |
| Leanne Li | Szeto Hiu-Sam(Queenie) (司徒曉心) | Stock Broker; Szeto Luen-Fai'a daughter Ting Shiu-King's lover. |
| Savio Tsang (曾偉權) | Chu Yuk-Wing (朱玉麟) | Butcher; Tseung Yu-Bo's lover. |

== Viewership ratings ==
| | Week | Episode | Average Points | Peaking Points | References |
|---|---|---|---|---|---|
| 1 | May 26–30, 2008 | 1 — 5 | 29 | 32 | |
| 2 | June 2–6, 2008 | 6 — 10 | 29 | 32 | |
| 3 | June 9–13, 2008 | 11 — 15 | 28 | 32 | |
| 4 | June 16–20, 2008 | 16 — 20 | 31 | — | |
| 4 | June 21, 2008 | 21 | 31 | 34 | |

== Awards and nominations ==
41st TVB Anniversary Awards (2008)

- "Best Drama"
- "My Favourite Male Character" (Michael Tse – Wong Chi-Chung)
- "My Favourite Female Character" (Kiki Sheung – Tseung Yu-Chu)
