= The Life and Times of a Sentinel =

Hong Kong television series

- Promo poster
- 紫禁驚雷
- Genre: Historical fiction
- Written by: Ng Siu-tung; Sit Kar-wah
- Starring: Steven Ma; Kenneth Ma; Sunny Chan; Power Chan; Selena Lee; Natalie Tong; Elaine Yiu; Mak Cheung-ching; Ben Wong; Ching Hor-wai; Grace Wong
- Theme music composer: Yip Siu-chung
- Opening theme: Bin Tin (變天) by Steven Ma
- Country of origin: Hong Kong
- Original language: Cantonese
- No. of episodes: 26 (total); 25 (with 2-hour finale)

Production
- Producer: Leung Choi-yuen
- Production location: Hong Kong
- Camera setup: Multi camera
- Running time: 45 minutes (per episode)
- Production company: TVB

Original release
- Network: TVB Jade
- Release: 25 July – 26 August 2011

Related
- Wax and Wane; River of Wine

The Life and Times of a Sentinel
- intertitle
- Traditional Chinese: 紫禁驚雷
- Simplified Chinese: 紫禁惊雷
- Literal meaning: "Frightening Thunder of the Purple Forbidden (City)"
Transcriptions
Standard Mandarin
- Hanyu Pinyin: Zijin Jingléi
Yue: Cantonese
- Jyutping: Zi2Gam3 Geng1leoi4

The Life and Times of a Sentinel (Traditional Chinese: 紫禁驚雷) is a 2011 Hong Kong historical-fiction television drama produced by Television Broadcasts Limited (TVB), starring Steven Ma and Kenneth Ma as the main leads, with Leung Choi-yuen serving as the executive producer.

Set in the late 17th century, during the early years of the Kangxi Emperor's reign over Qing China, the drama stars Nip Dor-po (Steven Ma), a third-grade imperial bodyguard. He is used by both the Kangxi Emperor (Power Chan) and Prince Yu (Kenneth Ma) to pit against each other, conflicting Dor-po's loyalty for both.

== Plot ==
The sudden death of the young Shun-chi Emperor (Shunzhi) shocked the whole empire. The second prince Fuk-tsuen, was originally the successor for the throne, but Empress Dowager Hao-chong (Xiaozhuang) changed the successor to the third prince Yuen-yip, who subsequently becomes the Hong-hei Emperor (Kangxi). Angry with this, Fuk-tsuen dispatches a spy, Nip Dor-po, and instructs him to gain Hong-hei's trust.

== Cast and characters ==
=== Main characters ===
Note: Some of the characters' names are in Cantonese romanisation.

- Steven Ma as Nip Dor-po (聶多寶) — a first class imperial bodyguard. He is sent by Fuk-tsuen to spy on Hong-hei, becoming the emperor's personal bodyguard. As Dor-po spends more time with the emperor, he learns to appreciate the emperor's intelligence and his love for the country. Dor-po ultimately decides to help Hong-hei rebel against Fuk-tsuen. Ma says that Dor-po is the most complicated character he has come across. "I have to officially protect the three (Hao-chong, Hong-hei, and Fuk-tsuen), but at the same time, the three are using me to deal with each other [...] but Hao-chong wants me to die, [Fuk-tsuen] wants me to die, and how can I find ways to save myself and Hong-hei?"
- Kenneth Ma as Fuk-tsuen, the Second Imperial Prince (二皇爺福全) — officially Prince Yu (裕親王), Fuk-tsuen is the Shun-chi Emperor's second son. For many years, Fuk-tsuen has been plotting to usurp the throne from Hong-hei as he believes that the throne was rightfully his. He sends Dor-po to spy on Hong-hei, which subsequently leads to Fuk-tsuen's downfall. He becomes Minister of Imperial Bodyguard and Imperial Council Minister. According to Ma, Fuk-tsuen isn't a villain but a tragic figure.

=== Supporting characters ===
- Sunny Chan makes a two-episode guest starring appearance as the Shun-chi Emperor (順治帝), Kangxi's father and predecessor. Océane Zhu stars as Consort Tung-ngok (董鄂妃), Shunzhi's favourite consort. Upset with his reign and devastated by the death of Tung-ngok, Shunzhi decided to become a Buddhist monk.
- Power Chan as the Hong-hei Emperor (康熙帝) — The Shun-chi Emperor's third son. He ascends the throne with the help of his grandmother, angering Fuk-tsuen, who was originally the successor to the throne.
- Selena Lee as Cheuk Chi-ying / Princess Duen-man (卓紫凝 / 端敏格格) — adopted daughter of Cheuk Shu-tong and Dor-po's primary romantic interest.
- Natalie Tong as Kwai-lun (桂倫), Second Princess Consort (二福晉) — Fuk-tsuen's wife. He marries her for her father's great military power.
- Elaine Yiu as Man-kwan (曼筠), the Imperial Noble Consort (皇貴妃) — Hong-hei's consort and Fuk-tsuen's true love.
- Mak Cheung-ching as Po-chai (布齊) — Dor-po's superior and head of imperial bodyguard.
- Ben Wong stars as Kei To-ting (祈道廷) — Shunzhi's personal bodyguard.
- Ching Hor-wai as Grand Empress Dowager Hao-chong (孝莊太皇太后) — Hong-hei and Fuk-tsuen's grandmother, who helps Hong-hei ascend the throne.
- Grace Wong as Ngan Yeung-suet (顔映雪), officially Consort Wai (惠妃) — Hong-hei's consort.
- Christine Kuo as Kin-ching (建澄), Fifth Princess Consort (五福晉) — Sheung-ning's wife.
- Katy Kung as Fung Sheung-hei (馮雙喜) — Dor-po's younger cousin.
- KK Cheung as Cheuk Shu-tong (卓樹棠) — secretly part of a group anti-Qing rebels, he owns a large medicine company in the capital city.
- Jack Wu as Ha-seen (哈善) — Kwai-lun's older cousin who is also a third class imperial bodyguard. He personally works for Fuk-tsuen.
- Tsui Wing as Sheung-ning, the Fifth Imperial Prince (五皇爺常寧) — officially Prince Kung (恭親王), general of capital imperial army and Sheung-ning is Shun-chi's fifth son.
- Stephen Wong as Nap-lan Sing-tak (納蘭性德) — Hong-hei's personal adviser, personal bodyguard and first class imperial bodyguard.
- Fred Cheng as Yan-chak (恩澤) — a fifth class imperial bodyguard and Dor-po's good friend.
- Rosanne Lui as Consort Sau (秀妃) — Shun-chi's consort and mother of Sheung-ning.
  - Yvonne Ho portrays young Consort Sau.
- Kwok Fung and Helen Ma as Nip Koon-yat (聶貫一) and Ko Choi-king (高彩瓊) respectively, Dor-po's foster parents.
- Felix Lok stars as Kei Man-cheong (祈萬昌) — Dor-po's father. Lai Lok-yi makes a one episode guest starring appearance as the young Kei Man-cheong.

== Awards and nominations ==
=== 45th TVB Anniversary Awards 2011 ===
- Nominated: Best Drama
- Nominated: Best Actor (Steven Ma)
- Nominated: Best Actor (Kenneth Ma)
- Nominated: Best Actress (Selena Lee)
- Nominated: Best Supporting Actor (Kwok-keung Cheung)
- Nominated: Best Supporting Actress (Hor-wai Ching)
- Nominated: My Favourite Male Character (Steven Ma)
- Nominated: Most Improved Female Artiste (Katy Kung)

== Viewership ratings ==
The following is a table that includes a list of the total ratings points based on television viewership. "Viewers in millions" refers to the number of people, derived from TVB Jade ratings (not including TVB HD Jade), in Hong Kong who watched the episode live. The peak number of viewers are in brackets.

Week	Episode(s)	Average points	Peaking points	Viewers (in millions)	References
1	1 — 5	26	—	1.66	
2	6 — 10	26	—	1.66	
3	11 — 15	27	—	1.72	
4	16 — 20	27	—	1.72	
5	21 — 26	31	38/40*	1.98 (2.43/2.56*)	

*The highest rating per minute.

== International Broadcast ==
- Malaysia - 8TV (Malaysia)
