= Ben Wong =

Hong Kong actor

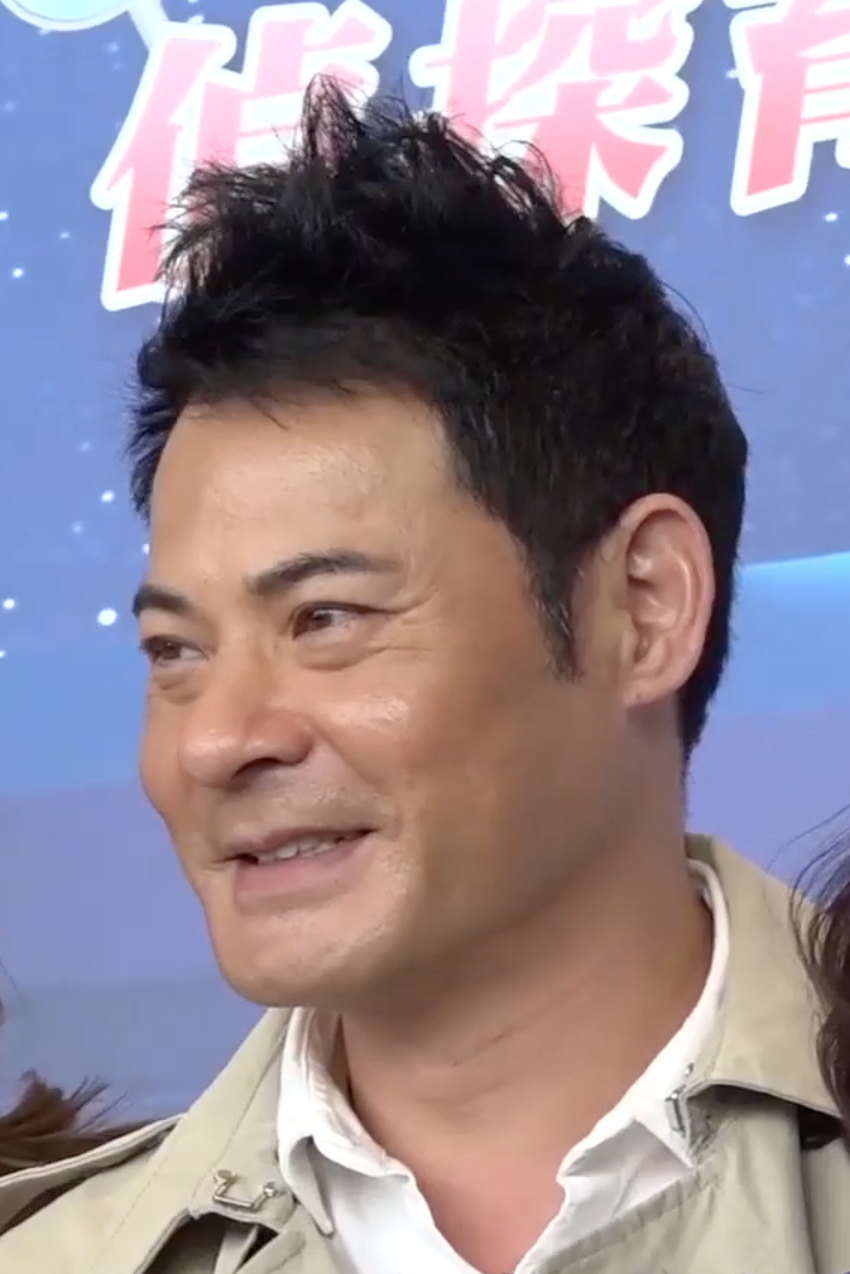
- Wong in 2019
- Born: British Hong Kong
- Occupations: Actor; TV presenter
- Years active: 1989–present
- Awards: TVB Anniversary Awards – Best Supporting Actor; 2011 Lives of Omission

Chinese name
- Traditional Chinese: 黃智賢
- Simplified Chinese: 黄智贤
Transcriptions
Standard Mandarin
- Hanyu Pinyin: Huáng Zhìxián
Yue: Cantonese
- Jyutping: Wong4 Zi3 Jin4

Signature
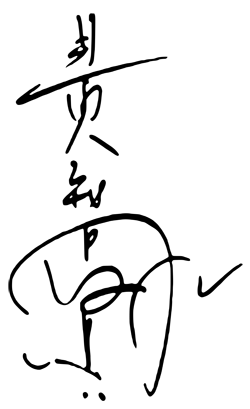

Ben Wong Chi-yin is a Hong Kong actor known for his roles as Yung Heung-hoi in the long-running drama series A Kindred Spirit and Spicy Ginger in the crime drama Lives of Omission, the latter garnering him Best Supporting Actor at the 2011 TVB Anniversary Awards.

== Filmography ==
=== Television dramas (TVB) ===
Title	Year	Role	Notes
The Heroes from Shaolin	1993	Tung Chin-kan / Lung Yeh	
The Legend of the Condor Heroes	1994	Tolui	
Detective Investigation Files II	1995	Lee Hon-keung	Episode: "Resurrection?"
A Kindred Spirit	1995–99	Yung Heung-hoi	TVB Anniversary Award for Best On-screen Couple (shared with Angie Cheong)
The Condor Heroes 95	1995	Kublai Khan	
The Criminal Investigator	1995	Lam Wai-po	Episodes 4–7
Corruption Doesn't Pay	1995	Go Luo	
ICAC Investigators 1996	1996	Au-yeung Chun	Episode 1: "Flying Over Barriers"
Triumph Over Evil	1997	Lin Nin	First Leading Role
Justice Sung II	1999	Fai Lam-ming	
Life for Life	1999	Ka-leung	
The Sky is the Limit	2000		
Loving You	2000	Wen Liangyu	
A Dream Named Desire	2000–01	Tim Lui Chi-chung	
Divine Retribution	2001	Chin Tou-tin	
Love Out of Gamble	2001	Lin Ying	
Legendary Fighter - Yang's Heroine	2001	Yang Yanzhao (Yang Liulang)	
The Monk Jigong	2001	Yang Dayi	
DNA	2002	Tong Wai-sang	
Video Life	2002	Paul	
Son from the Past	2004	Shing Shing	aka Venture Across Time
Treacherous Waters	2004	Iron Fist	
Chinese Paladin	2005	Wu King / Zhao Ye	
Into Thin Air	2005	Lau Kwok-wai	
Fantasy Hotel	2005	Alex Au Ngah-lik	
The Zone	2005	Episode 6	
Safe Guards	2006	Heung Hau	
The Price of Greed	2006	Ching Chi-him	Warehoused
Life Art	2007	Tsuen Ying-wai	
The Green Grass of Home	2007	Hung Kwok-wai	
Phoenix Rising	2007	Cheung Chi-hoi	Warehoused
On the First Beat	2007	Superintendent Po Lik-chi	
The Ultimate Crime Fighter	2007	Chong Man-hong	
Forensic Heroes II	2008	Wong Ching-hung	Episodes 1–3
Speech of Silence	2008	Sheung Fung	
Dressage to Win	2008	Lee Sir	Episode 8
Man in Charge	2009	Yim Gwoh	
Rosy Business	2009	General Chiu Yat-ming	
The Threshold of a Persona	2009	Sergeant Chung Chi-wing	
Beyond the Realm of Conscience	2009	Onizuka Kojiro	
The Beauty of the Game	2009–10	Leung Ching-on	
Growing Through Life	2010	Michael Lam Man-ho	
The Comeback Clan	2010	Paul Ka Po-law	
No Regrets	2010	Cheng Siu-hong	
Twilight Investigation	2010	Joe Cheng Yuen-ching	
Links to Temptation	2010-11	"KC" Ho Kwok-cheung	
A Great Way to Care	2011	Senior Inspector Chung Kwok-ban	Released overseas in 2009
Grace Under Fire	2011	Tong Yuet-hang (youth)	
The Life and Times of a Sentinel	2011	Kei To-ting	Episode 1
Lives of Omission	2011	Tang Kwok-ban (Spicy Ginger)	Supporting Role Won —TVB Anniversary Award for Best Supporting Actor; Won — Next TV Awards for Male Scene Stealer Supporting Actor Nominated — My AOD Favourites Award for My Favourite Supporting Actor (Top 5)
Curse of the Royal Harem	2011	Ngok-tai	
When Heaven Burns	2011-12	Bowman	
The Hippocratic Crush	2012	Dr. John Chong Pok-man	Supporting Role
Queens of Diamonds and Hearts	2012	Lord Shun-yeung	
The Greatness of a Hero	2012	Turkic emperor	Released overseas in 2009
Highs and Lows	2012	CIP Brian Poon Hok-lai	Major Supporting Role Nominated — My AOD Favourites Award for My Favourite Supporting Actor (Top 5)
Silver Spoon, Sterling Shackles	2012	Chai Yat-fai	Major Supporting Role
A Great Way to Care II	2013	SIP Chung Kwok-ban	
Always and Ever	2013	Ko Kai-on	Episode 2-13 (11 episodes) Nominated - TVB Anniversary Award for Best Supporting Actor Nominated — TVB Star Awards Malaysia for Favourite TVB Supporting Actor
The Hippocratic Crush II	2013	Dr. John Chong Pok-man	Guest Appearance
Gilded Chopsticks	2014	Yinzhen, the Fourth Imperial Prince / Yongzheng Emperor	Main Role Nominated - TVB Anniversary Award for Best Actor Nominated — TVB Star Awards Malaysia for Favourite TVB Supporting Actor
The Ultimate Addiction	2014	Chow Sun-yung	Major Supporting Role Nominated — StarHub TVB Awards for My Favourite TVB Supporting Actor
Raising the Bar	2015	Marcus Fan Chi-ngai	Main Role Nominated - TVB Anniversary Award for Best Actor Nominated - TVB Anniversary Award for Most Popular Male Character Nominated — StarHub TVB Awards for My Favourite TVB Actor Nominated — StarHub TVB Awards for My Favourite TVB Male Character Nominated — TVB Star Awards Malaysia for Favourite TVB Actor Nominated — TVB Star Awards Malaysia for Top 16 Favourite TVB Characters
Between Love & Desire	2016	Patrick Lui Wing-hang	Main Role Nominated - TVB Anniversary Award for Best Actor Nominated — StarHub TVB Awards for My Favourite TVB Male Character Nominated — TVB Star Awards Malaysia for Top 15 Favourite TVB Characters
Tiger Mom Blues	2017	Yim Ha	Main Role Nominated - TVB Anniversary Award for Best Actor Nominated - TVB Anniversary Award for Most Popular Male Character Nominated — TVB Star Awards Malaysia for My Favourite TVB Actor; Won — TVB Star Awards Malaysia for Top 17 Favourite TVB Characters
Nothing Special Force	2017	IP Ting Chi-mor	Main Role Nominated — StarHub TVB Awards for My Favourite Actor
Watch Out, Boss	2018	Marvin Hui Lap-kiu	Main Role
Birth of a Hero	2018	Sau But-kwan	Main Role
OMG, Your Honour	2018	John Fan Siu-yu	Main Role Nominated - TVB Anniversary Award for Best Actor Nominated - TVB Anniversary Award for Most Popular Male Character (Top 5)
The Ghetto-Fabulous Lady	2019	Kwan Yat-fu	Main Role
The Defected	2019	CSP Samuel Ching Yu-sum	Major Supporting Role
ICAC Investigators 2019	2019	Hon Yek-shan	Main Role
As Time Goes By	2019	Chai Man-kei	Main Role
Of Greed and Ants	2020	Barry Tong Ho-fung	Main Role Nominated - TVB Anniversary Award for Best Actor
Sinister Beings	2021	SIP Nic Sum Wai-lik (Nic Sir)	Main Role Nominated - TVB Anniversary Award for Best Actor Nominated - TVB Anniversary Award for Most Popular Male Character Nominated - TVB Anniversary Award for Favourite TVB Actor in Malaysia
Battle Of The Seven Sisters	2021	Barrister Fan	Special Appearance
Mission Run	2022	Cheuk Ting-kwong	Major Supporting Role
Sinister Beings (Sr. 2)	2024	SIP Nic Sum Wai-lik (Nic Sir)	Main Role

=== Television dramas (Shaw Brothers Studio) ===
Title	Year	Role	Notes
Mission Run	2022	Cheuk Ting-kwong	Major Supporting Role

=== Film ===
Title	Year	Role	Notes
Killers' Code	1996	Fung	Television film
Out of the Dark	1995	Ah Keung	
Love Cruise	1997	Li Chak-hoi	
Superstar in Running	2000		Television film
Prison on Fire - Life Sentence	2001	Tung	
Love Battlefield	2004	Sing	
The Room	2006	Yeung Kwong	
Fearless	2007	Yeung Kwong	
Love Is...	2007	Yeung Kwong	
Tactical Unit – Comrades in Arms	2009	Commander Ho Ka-kit	
Team of Miracle: We Will Rock You	2009		Cameo
Claustrophobia	2009	Michael	
City Under Siege	2010	Inspector Tong	
72 Tenants of Prosperity	2010	Leung Yu-sang	Cameo
Life Without Principle	2011	Lee Chi-man	
Turning Point 2	2011	Po Lik-chi	
Firestorm	2013	S.D.U. Team Leader	
Golden Brother	2014		
Keeper of Darkness	2015		

=== Dubbing ===
- Dub of War's Second Season's Graduation Project- Spider-Man: No Way Home (2022)- Max Dillion/Electro

=== Hosting gigs ===
- 1989: 陽光節拍一小時
- 1991: Flash Fax (閃電傳真機)
- 1996: 北極追蹤
- 1997: 龍的光輝香港回歸大匯演
- 1997–1998: TVB Anniversary Gala (萬千星輝賀台慶)
- 1997–1998: Tung Wah Charity Show (歡樂滿東華)
- 1998: Hong Thai Travels: United States Special (康泰旅遊特輯《美國特輯》)
- 1998: Miss Hong Kong 1998
- 1999: Po Leung Kuk (星光熠熠耀保良)
- 1999: Hong Thai Travels: Spain Special (康泰旅遊特輯《西班牙特輯》)
- 1999: Hong Thai Travels: Portugal Special (康泰旅遊特輯《葡萄牙特輯》)
- 1999: 護苗基金慈善夜
- 1999: 活得精彩獻再生
- 2002: The 8th Annual Most Popular TV Commercial Award (第八屆十大電視廣告頒獎典禮)
- 2010: Enoch's Footptint: Greece (以諾遊蹤-希臘保羅疾風之旅)
- 2011: Enoch's Footprint: Israel (以諾遊蹤 - 以色列 穌哥行傳)
- 2011: World Heritage List: China Danxia (世界遺產名錄 飛越丹霞) (Episodes 1–3)

Awards and achievements
TVB Anniversary Awards
Preceded by Evergreen Mak for No Regrets	Best Supporting Actor; 2011 for Lives of Omission	Succeeded by Incumbent
