= Dominic Lam =

Hong Kong actor

Dominic Lam Kar-wah 林嘉華
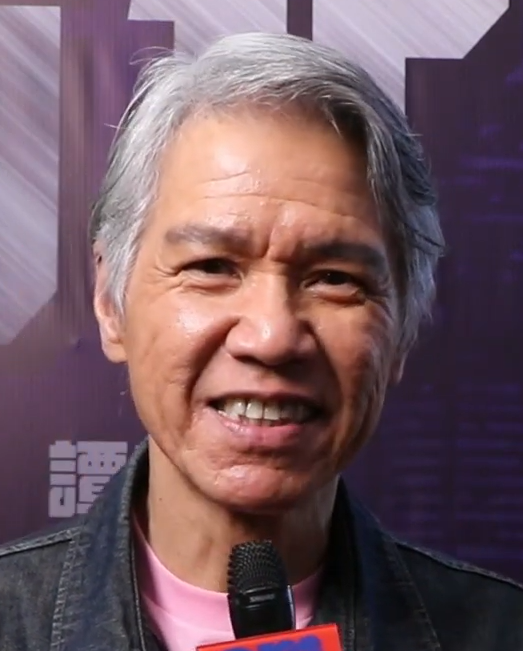
- Lam in February 2024
- Born: 2 April 1957 (age 69); British Hong Kong
- Education: St. Joseph's Anglo-Chinese Primary School; St. Joseph's Anglo-Chinese School (Junior School); Royal Hong Kong Police Cadet School (Senior School)
- Occupations: Actor; radio personality; television host
- Spouse: Jumbo Lau Po-chun (劉寶珍)
- Children: Jefford Lam Ching-fung (林政峰)

Chinese name
- Traditional Chinese: 林嘉華
- Simplified Chinese: 林嘉华
Transcriptions
Standard Mandarin
- Hanyu Pinyin: Lín Jiāhuá
Yue: Cantonese
- Jyutping: Lam^{4} Gaa^{1} Waa^{4}

Dominic Lam Kar-wah (Chinese: 林嘉華; born 2 April 1957) is a Hong Kong-Canadian actor and radio personality for Fairchild Radio in Richmond Hill, Canada. His acting career spans four decades, beginning with his television series debut in Crocodile Tears (1978).

== Biography ==
=== Acting career ===
Lam was part of the first graduating class of the Royal Hong Kong Police Cadet School in 1974. He then joined the Hong Kong Police Training School and worked as a police officer for five years. He hosted the television program Junior Police Call produced jointly by the Hong Kong Police Force and RTHK. Under the recommendation of producer Johnny Mak, Lam quitted the police to join Rediffusion Television and made his acting debut in Crocodile Tears (鱷魚淚). In 1980, Lam joined TVB. He made his film debut in the 1981 film No U-turn. Lam played various supporting roles in drama series and hosted several television programs until 1988 when he emigrated to Canada.

In 2006, Lam returned to Hong Kong and filmed the police drama On the First Beat. He has since starred in several popular television series such as Men Don't Cry (2007), The Money-Maker Recipe (2008), The Four (2008), and E.U. (2009). In 2010, Lam was nominated for Best Supporting Actor at the TVB Anniversary Awards for his performance in A Fistful of Stances. He starred as the antagonist Cheung Gwan in the 2014 crime series The Borderline produced by Hong Kong Television Network. He starred in the 2017 family drama The Tofu War. In 2019, he was cast in the action crime series Flying Tiger 2, playing the role of Au-yeung Ching, a businessman who runs an underground crime syndicate. In 2020, he played the role of Yuen Chun, the father of Madam Yuen in the crime thriller Brutally Young.

== Personal life ==
In February 2018, Lam revealed the secret of getting along with his wife in an interview. He said that no matter how many years they have been married, he will always treat his wife as a girlfriend. The couple should not be tolerant when getting along with each other, but should work together to adjust to any shortcomings and living habits.

In the 1980s, in order to provide his son, Jefford Lam Ching-fung, with a better growth and education environment, he suspended his career development in Hong Kong and immigrated to Canada with his family. My son runs a fashion online shopping platform in Canada. He is responsible for photography and writing to introduce the products. He also opened an environmentally friendly clothing company that prints T-shirts using mineral and plant natural dyes. Since 2020, due to the impact of the global COVID-19 pandemic, Lam chose to live in Canada permanently to accompany his family.

=== Radio show ===
After his immigration to Toronto in 1988, he began hosting the Cantonese lifestyle radio program Lam Ka Wah Carnival on CHKT operated by Fairchild Media. The radio show broadcasts every weekday. He hosted the show remotely when he returned to Hong Kong for filming.

== Filmography ==
=== TV series ===
Year	Title	Role	Notes
1978	Crocodile Tears 鱷魚淚	呂文釗	ATV Series
1978	巨星	凌四海	ATV Series
1979	Chameleon II 新變色龍	郭建華	ATV Series
1980	The Family 勢不兩立		
1980	新CID		
1980	Five Easy Pieces 輪流傳	姜兆熙	
1980	Fat Yin Won 發現灣		
1980	The Bund II 上海灘續集	郭鎮昌	
1981	No One is Innocent 逐個捉	戴馬素	
1981	My Little Darling 荳芽夢		
1981	The Road to Success 他的一生		
1982	Fool's Paradise 假日風情		
1982	將軍抽車		
1983	鴨仔里春光		
1987	Police Cadet '88 新紮師兄1988	程君澤	
1988	And Yet We Live 當代男兒	程家勇	
1990	Priceless Adventure 香港蛙人	Peter	
1990	Cherished Moments 回到未嫁時	Lung Fei 龍飛	
1990	Rain in the Heart 成功路上	張順品	
1991	Rainbow 漂白英雄	關世傑	
1993	Man of Wisdom 金牙大狀	倪鐵樑	
1993	The Link 天倫	Lam Ka Dat 林家達	
1994	The Ching Emperor 天子屠龍		
1994	File of Justice III 壹號皇庭III	程大志	
1994	Legend of the Condor Heroes	Yeung Ti Sum 楊鐵心	
1994	Crime and Passion 新重案傳真	馬兆軍	
1995	Down Memory Lane 萬里長情	黃水	
1996	Ancient Heroes 隋唐群英會	虬髯客	
2007	Men Don't Cry	Wong Fei-hung	Nominated - My Favourite Male Character (Top 24)
2007	On The First Beat	Wu Cheuk-yan	
2008	The Money-Maker Recipe	Ting Shiu-king	
2008	The Four	Chukot Ching-ngor	
2009	E.U.	Wu Cheuk-yan	
2009	In the Chamber of Bliss	Mok Yik-tin	Nominated - Best Supporting Actor (Top 15)
2010	A Fistful of Stances	Wing Tak	Nominated - Best Supporting Actor (Top 5)
2010	Beauty Knows No Pain	Chin Kwong-lung	
2010	Growing Through Life	Chung Kin-shing	
2011	Grace Under Fire	Lui Kong	
2012	Tiger Cubs	Leung Yat-fung	
2014	The Borderline	Cheung Gwan	
2015	Incredible Mama	Sir Luk Gwan-chong	
2015	Karma	Lam Kwok-leung	
2015	IPCC Files 2015		
2015	Night Shift	Bao Kuk	
2015	Paranormal Mind		
2015	Elite Brigade III		
2016	Infernal Affairs		
2017	The Tofu War		
2017	OCTB		
2018	Another Era	Martin	
2018	Shadow of Justice	康嘉良 / 康 Sir	
2019	Flying Tiger 2	Au-yeung Ching	
2020	Brutally Young	阮進	
2025	Prism Breaker	戴祖福	

=== Film ===
The following is a list of films for Dominic Lam.

- No U-Turn (1981)
- Mr. Mistress (1988)
- Malevolent Mate (1993)
- Unclassified File (1994)
- Century Hero (1999)
- Dog Bite Dog (2006)
- Invisible Target (2007)
- Look for a Star (2009)
- Overheard (2009)
- Team Miracle: We Will Rock You (2009)
- Let's Go! (film) (2011)
- That Demon Within (2014)
- Overheard 3 (2014)
- SPL II: A Time For Consequences (2015)
- Heartfall Arises (2016)
- The Leaker (2018)
- Big Brother (2018)
- Project Gutenberg (2018)
- Distinction (2018)
- Fatal Visit (2019)
- Iron Fist (2019)

=== Documentary ===
- Dragon Since 1973 (2002)
