= E.U. (TV series) =

Hong Kong television drama

- Official poster
- Also known as: The Academy III
- 學警狙擊
- Genre: Drama; Crime thriller
- Created by: Wong wai-sing
- Written by: Chu King-king; Lee Yee-wah; Leung Yan-tung
- Starring: Ron Ng; Sammul Chan; Michael Miu; Kathy Chow; Michael Tse; Elanne Kong; Kaki Leung; Dominic Lam
- Opening theme: Hak Bak Bin Jau (黑白變奏) by Ron Ng, Michael Tse, Sammul Chan
- Ending theme: Sau Cheung Yan (手掌印) by Elanne Kong
- Composer: Chow Wing-hang
- Country of origin: Hong Kong
- Original language: Cantonese
- No. of episodes: 30

Production
- Executive producer: Wong Wai-sing
- Production location: Hong Kong
- Camera setup: Multi camera
- Running time: 45 minutes (per episode)
- Production company: TVB

Original release
- Network: TVB Jade
- Release: 16 February – 27 March 2009

Related
- The Academy (2005); On the First Beat (2007); Turning Point (2009) Lives of Omission (2011) Turning Point 2 (2011)

E.U.
- E.U. title card
- Traditional Chinese: 學警狙擊
- Simplified Chinese: 学警狙击
- Literal meaning: "Police Cadets in Action"
Transcriptions
Standard Mandarin
- Hanyu Pinyin: Xúejíng Jūjī
Yue: Cantonese
- Jyutping: Hok6 Ging2 Zeoi1 Gik1

Emergency Unit, better known as simply E.U. is a 2009 Hong Kong television drama created and produced by Wong Wai-sing. It is the direct sequel to 2007's On the First Beat and the third installment in The Academy series. E.U. stars Ron Ng and Sammul Chan from the original series, with the addition of Michael Miu, Kathy Chow, Michael Tse, and Elanne Kong. The popularity of Tse's role, Laughing Gor, spawned two film spin-offs and a television drama spin-off of the character.

Unlike the two previous installments, E.U. focuses on one particular secret triad, while the first two focuses more on the general lives of the characters. E.U. stands for Emergency Unit, a traffic and criminal operation wing under the Hong Kong Police Force. The series was meant to be followed by a sequel, however, production dropped the sequel, but reused the majority of its cast in an alternate series, Relic of an Emissary.

== Cast ==
=== The Kong family ===
Cast	Role	Description
Michael Miu	Kong Sai-Hau 江世孝	Become boss of Chun Hing Triad after To Yik-Tin died (main villain)
Elanne Kong	Kong Yau-yau 江悠悠	Kong Sai-Hau's daughter Chung Lap Man's girlfriend

=== Police unit ===
Cast	Role	Description
Dominic Lam	Wu Cheuk-Yan (Wu Sir) 胡卓仁	Senior Superintendent Of Police (SSP); Department Head of OCTB; Chung Lap Man's undercover handler SSP39384
Sammul Chan	Lee Pak-Kiu 李柏翹	Police Constable (PC); Later promoted to Probationary Inspector of Police PI66341; Emergency Unit (E.U.); OCTB Team B Leader; Fa Yeuk-Bo's husband
Ron Ng	Chung Lap-Man 鍾立文	Police Constable PC66336 of CID Unit; Kong Yau-Yau's boyfriend (distant); Undercover Police Officer; Joined OCTB Team B at the ends Lee Pak Kiu's best friend
Kaki Leung (梁嘉琪)	Fa Yeuk-Bo 花若葆	Police Constable WPC66914; Emergency Unit (E.U.); Ching Yeuk-Sam's younger half sister Ma Ying Oi's daughter Lee Pak-Kiu's wife
Lee Ka Sing (李家聲)	Lam Suk-Chuen 林叔泉	Police Constable PC66340 Police Constable; Emergency Unit (E.U.); OCTB Team B Constable
Casper Chan (陳思齊)	Yiu Ling Ling (Cho Ling) 姚玲玲	Police Constable WPC66550 Police Constable; Emergency Unit (E.U.); Kwok Kai-Bong's Wife
Jason Pai (白彪)	Si To Chiu 司徒超	Sergeant SGT38401; Emergency Unit (E.U.); Leung Siu Tong's and Fa Yeuk-Bo's mentor
Aimee Chan	Chiu Wan-De (Wendy) 趙雲迪	Police Constable WPC66349; Leung Siu Tong's ex-girlfriend Dies in episode 16
Felix Lok	Kwok Pui 郭培	Senior Superintendent Of Police (SSP); Kwok Kai-Chiu's and Kwok Kai-Bong's father Leung Siu Tong's Undercover handler
Ellesmere Choi	Kwok Kai-Chiu 郭啟超	Senior Inspector Of Police (SIP); Kwok Kai-Bong's older brother

=== Triad ===
Cast	Role	Description
Lam Lee (林利)	To Yik-Tin 杜亦天	Boss of Chun Hing Triad; Shot and killed in Episode 6
Kathy Chow	Ching Yeuk-Sam 程若芯	To Yik-Tin's wife, later Kong Sai-Hau's fiancee Fa Yeuk-Bo's older half-sister Ma Ying Oi's daughter Shot and killed by Kong Sai-Hau in Episode 28
Michael Tse	Leung Siu Tong (Laughing) 梁笑棠	Triad Leader; Shot and killed in Episode 22; Undercover cop PC66715; Has a crush on Ching Yeuk-Sam
Joel Chan	Fai Wing-Lun 費永倫	Fai Hung's son Triad Leader
King Kong Lee (金剛)	Zhong 韓志忠	Kong Sai-Hau's most trusted assistant
Alex Lam (林子善)	La Ba 劉國強	Kong Yau-Yau's roommate Chung Lap-Man's mate
Chun Wong (秦煌)	Fai Hung 費雄	Fai Wing-Lun's father Triad Elder
Dexter Young	"Chicken" (Lat Gai)/ Chu Wing-Fuk 朱永福	Triad Boss of New Territories

=== Other ===
Cast	Role	Description
Angelina Lo (盧宛茵)	Fa Ma Ying Ngoi 花馬英愛	Fa Yeuk-Bo's and Ching Yeuk-Sam's mother
Wada Hiromi (裕美)	娟	Student
Jess Shum	Ho Wing-chi 何詠芝	Fai Wing-Lun's wife
Oscar Chan (陳堃)	Kwok Kai-Bong 郭啟邦	Yiu Ling Ling's (Cho Ling) husband Owner of bookstore
Annie Chong		Shopkeeper
Chiu Shek Man (招石文)		Chiu Wan-Di's father
Alice Fung So-bor		Chiu Wan-Di's mother

== Reception ==
The series shifted into a much darker theme compared to the last two instalments with its focus more on triads. It received mostly positive responses, particularly for Michael Tse's performance. His performance in E.U. is regarded as one of the best performances in his career. He is also favored to win Best Supporting Actor award in 2009's TVB Anniversary Awards. Due to overwhelming criticism of Tse's character's demise, Tse appeared and spoke in the last scene of the series and a prequel of E.U based on Laughing's life, entitled Turning Point, was produced. It was premiered on August 10, 2009 and was released in cinemas on 13 August 2009. The television spinoff Lives of Omission was released in 2011 based on his character.

However, Leung Ka Ki's role as "Fa Yeuk-Bo" receive almost complete negative response from viewers; this is somehow odd given that Ka Ki's role in the series is supposed to be a "good character", although one possible reason is the character's stereotypical attitude towards the triads.

== Notes ==
- Joey Yung didn't reprise her role as Cheung Nim-Yan, Chung Lap-Man's (Ron Ng) girlfriend. To end her involvement in the series, it's been explained that the couple had separated and she left Hong Kong after marrying another man.
- Kate Tsui from the previous installment also left the series.
- Michael Tao's character doesn't return to the series either but references to his character are made. His newborn son and him immigrated sometime between On the First Beat and E.U.

== Awards and nominations ==
TVB Anniversary Awards (2009)

Won

- Best Supporting Actor (Michael Tse)
- Most Improved Actress (Aimee Chan)

Nominated

- Best Drama
- Best Actor (Michael Miu)
- Best Actress (Kathy Chow)
- Best Supporting Actor (Joel Chan)
- Best Supporting Actress (Elanne Kong)
- My Favourite Male Character (Michael Miu)
- My Favourite Male Character (Michael Tse)
- My Favourite Female Character (Kathy Chow)

== Viewership ratings ==
	Week	Episode	Average Points	Peaking Points	References
1	February 16–20, 2009	1—5	29	31	
2	February 23–27, 2009	6—10	29	32	
3	March 2–6, 2009	11—15	30	31	
4	March 9–13, 2009	16—19	29	31	
5	March 16–20, 2009	20—24	30	33	
6	March 23–27, 2009	25—30	34	43	
6	March 27, 2009	29—30	36	43	

== See also ==
- Turning Point (2009 action film)
- Lives of Omission
- Relic of an Emissary
