= Turning Point (2009 Hong Kong film) =

2009 Hong Kong film by Herman Yau

- Film poster

Chinese name
- Traditional Chinese: Laughing Gor之變節
- Simplified Chinese: Laughing Gor之变节
Transcriptions
Standard Mandarin
- Hanyu Pinyin: Laughing Gor Zhì Bìan Jié
Yue: Cantonese
- Jyutping: Laughing Gor Zi1 Bin3 Zit3
- Directed by: Herman Yau
- Screenplay by: Yip Tin-shing; Poon Man-hung; Wong Yeung-tat
- Story by: Sharon Au
- Produced by: Tommy Leung
- Starring: Michael Tse; Anthony Wong; Francis Ng; Felix Wong; Wayne Lai; Fala Chen; Eric Tsang; Yuen Biao
- Cinematography: Chan Kwong-hung
- Edited by: Chung Wai-chiu
- Music by: Mak Chun Hung
- Production companies: Shaw Brothers Studio; Television Broadcasts Limited
- Distributed by: Intercontinental Film Distributors (HK)
- Release date: 13 August 2009
- Running time: 89 minutes
- Country: Hong Kong
- Languages: Cantonese; Hokkien
- Box office: US$2,020,712

Turning Point is a 2009 Hong Kong action crime thriller film directed by Herman Yau and starring Michael Tse in the title role of "Laughing Gor" and co-starring veteran actors Francis Ng and Anthony Wong. Released in Hong Kong on 13 August 2009, this is the first film to be produced by Shaw Brothers since 2003's Drunken Monkey.

Michael Tse's performance as "Laughing Gor" in the TVB television serial E.U was well received, and due to his popularity, TVB general manager Stephen Chan Chi-wan, during an interview with Tse in Be My Guest on 1 April 2009, announced that a prequel/spin-off featuring "Laughing Gor" would be made and presented Tse a contract for the film.

== Plot ==
The story takes place before the early year of 2000 when Laughing (Michael Tse) is an undercover cop, but because of a drug case, Inspector Poon (Felix Wong) has been trying to track him down.

Laughing is supposedly an undercover cop who has infiltrated a triad organization. However, before he became a cop, Laughing was a member of the triads and worked for the triad leader Lai Tin-yat, aka Brother One (Anthony Wong). Brother was very good to Laughing, and Laughing looked up to him as his elder brother. In order to strengthen his business and illegal activities, Brother One arranges for Laughing to join the Police Force and become his mole to gather information about the plans and counter-plans for operations by the police.

Laughing graduated from Police Academy with outstanding results but before he was assigned to a post as a police officer, his "bad boy" image attracted the attention of the Head of District Anti-Triad Squad, Superintendent Sin (Yuen Biao) who arranges his assignment as an undercover cop to infiltrate the mob syndicate.

Laughing is now a "double" agent. Brother One was happy with this turn of events as Laughing was assigned to infiltrate the mob of his triad rival sibling Zatoi (Francis Ng), who tries to make life difficult for Laughing. To further complicate the situation, Laughing falls in love with Zatoi's sister, Karen (Fala Chen).

How will Laughing contend with the law, the triad brotherhood, and his love affair? No matter which camp he sides with, he is doomed to be a traitor to the other. Which path will Laughing ultimately choose to follow?

== Cast ==
=== Ching Hing Society (Brother One's Gang) ===
- Anthony Wong as Lai Tin-yat (黎天一), nicknamed Brother One (一哥), the main antagonist of the film, a former undercover cop who is now one of the leaders of Ching Hing Society and the nemesis of Zatoi. Brother One takes Laughing under his wing and plants him as a mole in the police force, only for Laughing's handler, Superintendent Sin, to plant him undercover into Ching Hing Society.
- Michael Tse as Leung Siu-tong (梁笑棠), nicknamed Laughing, the main protagonist of the film, a store clerk who becomes Brother One's underling after the latter saved him from robbers. Laughing was later planted by Brother One as a mole into the police force, only for Superintednent Sin to assign him on as an undercover cop in Ching Hing Society, working as a double-undercover, eventually turning against Brother One.
- Kenny Wong as Cheh Chai (車仔), one of Brother One's underlings who is actually an undercover cop (PC4278).
- Dickson Wong as one of Brother One's underlings.
- Oscar Leung as Siu-lung (小龍), Laughing's underling.
- Tracy Ip as one of Brother One's underling who is also his lawyer.
- Lorretta Chow as one of Brother One's girlfriends.
- Koni Lui as one of Brother One's girlfriends who is also his accountant.
- Sherry Chen as one of Brother One's girlfriends.
- Lin Chi-hung as one of Laughing's underlings after he becomes a triad leader in his second undercover mission.
- Chow Chi-ho as one of Laughing's underlings after he becomes a triad leader in his second undercover mission.

=== Ching Hing Society (Zatoi's Gang) ===
- Francis Ng as Zatoi (座頭), a leader of the Ching Hing Society and Brother One's nemesis. He victimizes Laughing after discovering him dating his young sister, Karen, although Zatoi later helps Laughing and Karen escape when the former was marked for death by Brother One.
- Johnson Lee as Child (阿巢), one of Zatoi's underlings who work as Brother One's mole.
- Ngo Ka-nin as 'No Fight (撈輝), one of Zatoi's underlings.
- Edwin Siu as Zatoi's lawyer.
- Fala Chen as Karen, Zatoi's younger sister, who is a college student. Zatoi is very protective of Karen and was enraged to find out she was dating Laughing, a triad member.

=== Ching Hing Society (The Elders) ===
- Eric Tsang as Master Ford (福爺), one of the main leaders of Chin Hing Society.
- Alan Chui Chung-San as Master Da, a Taiwanese drug dealer with whom Brother One collaborates and speaks Hokkien.
- Lee Ka-ting as Master Ting (鼎爺), one of the main leaders of Chin Hing Society.

=== Police unit ===
- Yuen Biao as Superintendent Sin (冼Sir), superintendent of the Organised Crime & Triad Bureau (OCTB) and Laughing's undercover handler.
- Felix Wong as Poon Man-kei (潘文基), senior inspector of OCTB who has been tracking Brother One and Laughing for years.
- Wayne Lai as Mo (阿武), station sergeant of OCTB.
- Tai Chi-wai as Laughing's instructor in the police academy.
- Ron Ng as a police constable (PC26168) whom Laughing humiliates near end of the film.
- Sammul Chan as a police constable (PC32017) whom Laughing humiliates near end of the film.
- Benjamin Yuen as an OCTB officer.
- Matthew Ko as an OCTB officer.
- Anna Yau as Superintendent Sin's wife.

=== Other ===
- Sung Poon-chung as a robber who attempted to rob Laughing while the latter was working as a clerk in a convenience store.
- Lai Tung-hong as a killer sent by Ching Hing Society after Laughing
- Wong So-fun as Amy, a restaurant waitress.

== Release ==
Due to Laughing's character already flavoured among local audiences, the film performed outstanding in Hong Kong's Box office, earning $675,295 in 35 screenings with $19,294 per average topping the charts during its opening weekend. Till today, the film finally grossed US$2,020,712 (HK 15.7 million), one of the four domestic films to be placing into the top 10 in the summer.

== Conflicts between E.U. and Turning Point ==
The production company that produced Turning Point made the unusual decision to exclude the very story writers of E.U. to have another group to fill in Laughing's prequel story. Due to the lack of consideration of canon, a series of plot conflicts between the series and movie were revealed. Most of the established lore of Laughing in E.U. were ignored and replaced by an alternate reality time line of Laughing's life as an undercover cop:

- Laughing was shown to join the police academy for his idealism for justice and honor. His motivations also convinced his girlfriend, Wendy, to also join the academy to become good peacekeepers; the movie replaces his original undercover recruiter, officer Kwok Pui, with officer Sin. Wendy's involvement in E.U. was ignored in the movie.
- Laughing's diary clearly mentions his 10-year stint undercover was largely involved in To Yik-tin's triad to expose their activities; the film mentions his involvement with another triad that greatly conflicts with the time-line within his diary.
- The movie revolves more of Laughing's life as an underling rather than a gang boss.
- The 5 dollar HK coin Laughing was given to him by Brother One, but in E.U. it was just an ordinary coin Laughing was going to give Wendy just to buy a drink.
- In E.U. it was said that Laughing had never killed anyone but in Turning Point he killed his boss Brother One.
- In E.U. when Laughing met Hau, he was bald, but in Turning Point he wasn't.

== Accolades ==
Accolades
| Ceremony | Category | Recipient | Outcome |
|---|---|---|---|
| 29th Hong Kong Film Awards | Best New Performer | Fala Chen | Nominated |

Note: Wang Po-chieh's original nomination for the Best New Performer for Bodyguards and Assassins was withdrawn after he was confirmed to be an actor in the 2008 Taiwan film Winds of September. His nomination was replaced by Fala Chen.

== Sequels ==
On 1 August 2011, Lives of Omission, a distant television sequel, premiered on TVB Jade. On 29 December of the same year, Turning Point 2, a direct film sequel to Lives of Omission, was theatrically released.
