= Michael Tse =

Hong Kong actor

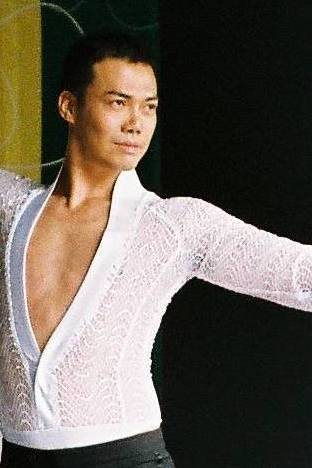
- Tse in dance costume
- Born: Tse Hing-wah (謝興華); 15 July 1967 (age 59); British Hong Kong
- Occupations: Actor; singer; dancer
- Years active: 1986–present
- Awards: Astro Wah Lai Toi Drama Awards; My Favourite Character; 2006 La Femme Desperado; My Favourite AOD Awards; My Favourite On-Screen Couple; 2011 Lives of Omission; My Favorite Theme song 2011 Lives of Omission; My Top 15 Favourite Television Characters; 2011 Lives of Omission; 2012 Sergeant Tabloid; My Favorite Classic Role (5-Year Anniversary Special Award); 2012 E.U. Beijing Youku Drama Awards; Best Actor of the Year (HK/Taiwan); 2011 Lives of OmissionTVB Anniversary Awards – Best Supporting Actor; 2009 E.U.

Chinese name
- Traditional Chinese: 謝天華
- Simplified Chinese: 谢天华
Transcriptions
Standard Mandarin
- Hanyu Pinyin: Xiè Tiánhuá
Yue: Cantonese
- Jyutping: ze6 tin1 waa4
- Musical career
- Also known as: Laughing Gor
- Genres: Cantopop

Michael Tse Tin-wah (born 15 July 1967) is a Hong Kong actor and singer.

== Career ==
Michael Tse graduated from TVB's Dance Training Class and worked with TVB as a dancer for five years. He then left TVB and formed a boy band group called 風火海 (Wind Fire Sea) with Jordan Chan and Jason Chu. Two CDs were then released in 1994 and 1995 accordingly by the boy band group.

In 1996's Young and Dangerous, Tse acted as a character called "Tai Tin Yee" in the triad genre. The film was a huge success, which led to nine sequels and spinoffs before the series concluded in 2000. The boy band group was dismissed later then.

In 1997, Tse participated Hong Kong's first modern musical Snow.Wolf.Lake. In 1998, Tse participated in the TV series A Kindred Spirit and officially becoming a TVB artist/ television actor. He was featured as the important supporting actor in many TV dramas like Detective Investigation Files (1999), Virtues of Harmony (2001–2003, 2003–2005) and Legal Entanglement (2002).

=== Breakout role ===
His breakout role was that of Man King-leung in the TVB drama series La Femme Desperado (2006), which gained him his popularity with the audience. In 2007, he was cast as the leading role of Ho Yee in the TV series Best Bet.

Also in 2007, he participated in the joint partnership production between TVB and Henan TV spinoff of BBC's Strictly Come Dancing (舞動奇跡), and was the winner.

=== Laughing Gor ===
His performance as undercover cop "Laughing Gor" in E.U. became a breakout character. His role "Laughing Gor" became very popular with netizens and audiences of E.U.. Due to his popularity, a prequel/spin-off film of E.U. featuring "Laughing Gor", entitled Turning Point, was produced.

Continuing popularity enabled the production of a 30-episode sequel series, Lives of Omission, in 2011 and a film sequel titled Turning Point 2 began filming in October 2011 and was released on 29 December 2011. Lives of Omission also won the TVB Anniversary Award for Best Drama at the 2011 TVB Anniversary Awards.

=== Departing TVB for a second time ===
After the arrival of rival broadcasters Hong Kong Television Network, many TVB stars went on to join HKTV. After months of speculation whether Tse was going to join his former celebrities, he decided not to renew his contract with TVB which expired on 30 June. Tse insists talks were amicable and will continue his working relationship with TVB as there will be more opportunities in the future.

Since announcing his departure with TVB, Tse has openly expressed his disappointment in not winning the TVB Best Actor award in 2011 with his breakout role, Laughing Gor, which led many to believe the main reason why Tse did not extend his contract. Rumors speculated that he would join either Eric Tsang or Ricky Wong promotional company but instead Tse set up his own company, The Laughing Workshop, to focus more on the Mainland market.

In 2021, he joined the cast of Call Me by Fire as a contestant.

== Personal life ==
In December 2008, Tse was involved in a car accident in the West Harbour Crossing and was arrested for drunk driving after an alcohol content examination. On 11 March 2009, he was found guilty at Eastern Magistracy and is sentenced to six weeks imprisonment with one year probation and fined $9500. His driving license was also suspended for eighteen months.

== Filmography ==
=== TV series ===
Year	Title	Role	Notes
1995	A Kindred Spirit	Lo Sang-mun 羅生門 (Simon)	
1998	Time Off 《生命有TAKE2》	Mak Sai-ho 麥世豪 (Thomas)	
1998	As Sure As Fate	Cheng Wing-kin 鄭永健	
1998	Moments of Endearment	Lee Chun-fai 李俊輝	
1998	ICAC Investigators 1998	Mak Kai-fai 麥嘉輝	Episode 2: "The Hundred Million Rule" (億萬裁決)
1999	Detective Investigation Files IV	Lau Sai-cheung 劉世昌	
1999	Anti-Crime Squad 《反黑先鋒》	Turbo	
1999	Face to Face 《雙面伊人》	Mok Yat-ming 莫一鳴	
1999	Dragon Love 《人龍傳說》	Lui Tai-pang 雷大鵬	
1999	Witness to a Prosecution	Sit Dan 薛丹	
2001	Virtues of Harmony	Kam Yuet 金月	
2001	At Point Blank	Chan Siu-ming 陳小明	
2001	Screen Play《娛樂反斗星》	Lam Kwong-cheung 藍廣昌	
2002	Legal Entanglement	Yeung Ming 楊明 (Joe)	
2002	Love and Again	Lau Fuk-wing 劉福榮	
2003	Virtues of Harmony II	Kam Yuet 金月 (Marco)	
2005	The Zone《奇幻潮》	Michael	Appeared in ep.8 "I Love You" (我愛你)
2006	La Femme Desperado	Man King-leung 文景良 (Ah Man)	Nominated – TVB Award for Most Improved Male Artiste
2007	Best Bet	Ho Yee 賀義	
2007	The Slicing of the Demon	Sui Yu-chan 水如塵	
2007	The Family Link	Fong Yim-cho 方彥祖 (Joe)	
2007	Word Twisters' Adventures	Fong Tong-keng 方唐鏡	
2008	The Money-Maker Recipe	Wong Chi-chung 黃子聰	Nominated – TVB Award for My Favourite Male Character
2009	E.U.	Leung Siu-tong / Laughing 梁笑棠 / Laughing哥	Ming Pao Anniversary Award for My Most Supportive Performance; TVB Award for Best Supporting Actor; My AOD Favourite Awards for My Favorite Classic Role (5-Year Anniversary Special Award); Nominated – TVB Award for My Favourite Male Character (Top 5)
2009	You're Hired	Ngon Jo-lin 安祖連 (Johnny)	
2010	Cupid Stupid	Koon Sing-ho 官星皓 (Jeff)	Warehoused overseas
2010	My Better Half	Ching Yee 程義	Nominated – TVB Award for Best Supporting Actor
2011	The Rippling Blossom	Yue Chi-hiu 魚至囂	
2011	Relic of an Emissary	Ngo Siu-fung 敖笑風	
2011	Lives of Omission	Leung Siu-tong / Laughing Gor 梁笑棠 / Laughing哥	My AOD Favourites for My Favourite Drama Character (1 of 15); My AOD Favourites for My Favourite On Screen Couple (shared with Fala Chen); My AOD Favourites for My Favourite Drama Theme Song; Beijing Youku Drama Awards for Best Actor of the Year (HK/Taiwan); Nominated - TVB Anniversary Award for Best Actor (Top 5); Nominated - TVB Anniversary Award for My Favourite Male Character (Top 5); Nominated - My AOD Favourites for Best Actor (Top 5); Nominated - Ming Pao Anniversary Award for Outstanding Actor in Television
2012	L'Escargot	Ko Wang-chim 高宏瞻 (Jim)	
2012–13	Friendly Fire	Kam Cho-chan 甘祖贊 (Jay, JJ)	
2013	Hero 《英雄》	King Goujian of Yue	
2013	Sergeant Tabloid	Lam Yat-yat 藍一一 (Gordon, A1)	My AOD Favourites for My Favourite Drama Character (1 of 15); Nominated - My AOD Favourites for Best Actor (Top 12)
2013	Sniper Standoff	Lee Ho-yeung 李浩陽	
2015	Father Is a Dragon 《爸爸是條龍》	Peng Fei 彭飛	
2015	Survivor Games with Bear Grylls 《跟着贝尔去冒险》	Himself	Season 1. Male winner.
2019	Route		
2020	Line Walker: Bull Fight	Mysterious Sniper	Cameo in episode 37

=== Film ===
Year	Title	Role	Notes	Ref.
1985	Dead Curse《猛鬼迫人》			
1994	The Other Side of the Sea《海角危情》			
1995	The Blade	Skeleton		
1995	The Golden Girls	actor		
1996	Young and Dangerous	Tai Tin Yee 大天二		
1996	Young and Dangerous 2	Tai Tin Yee 大天二		
1996	Young and Dangerous 3	Tai Tin Yee 大天二		
1996	Street of Fury	Fu 虎		
1996	Tri-Star	passerby laughing at Qiang		
1996	Feel 100%, Once More 百分百岩Feel》	Galinano		
1996	Best of the Best《飛虎雄心2傲氣比天高》	Hommie Chu Ka-choi		
1996	Growing Up 《人細鬼大》	Michael Fung		
1997	Young and Dangerous 4	Tai Tin Yee 大天二		
1997	Those Were the Days	man with lighter in Ku Wak Chai movie		
1997	Whatever Will Be, Will Be			
1997	The Peeping Tom 《赤足驚魂》	Inspector Ken Cheng		
1998	The Storm Riders	Frost 秦霜		
1998	Rape Trap《強姦陷阱》	Leung Chun-wah		
1998	You Light Up My Life	Tony		
1998	Shed No Tears 《男兒血淚》			
1998	Love & Let Love!《生死戀》	Cliff's buddy		
1998	Troublesome Night 3	Daviv		
1998	Fatal Desire			
1999	I.C. Kill	Jim Cheung		
1999	My Loving Trouble 7《我愛777》	Steven		
1999	The H.K. Triad《O記三合會檔案》			
1999	The Young Ones《監獄風雲之少年犯》	Fat B		
1999	The Masked Prosecutor	Wan Chi-lin		
2000	Return to Dark《改正歸邪》	Blondie		
2000	And I Hate You So《小親親》	Dog owner in Antique shop		
2000	Those Were the Days...	Tai Tin Yee 大天二	Spin-off to Young and Dangerous franchise	
2000	Conspiracy	Andy Yeung		
2000	Born to Be King	Michael		
2000	Twilight Garden 《幽谷約會》	Wah 阿華		
2000	Queenie & King the Lovers 《Q畸戀人》	Shun		
2001	The Final Winner 《古惑仔之出位》	Wong Po		
2001	The Losers' Club《廢柴同盟》	Chiu		
2001	Devil Eye《我真係見到鬼》			
2001	Killing End《殺科》	So Wai Fai		
2001	Bullets of Love	cop shot in the street		
2002	Black Mask 2: City of Masks	Iguana (Cantonese voice)		
2002	Women From Mars《當男人變成女人》	Gangster in hell		
2003	The Secret Society - Boss	Lee Sirb李Sir		
2003	The Princess of Temple Street			
2003	Kidnap the Wrong Person 《綁錯義嫂著錯草》	Nonsense		
2004	Cow Unbowed《誓不低頭》	Ko Fung		
2004	Who is the Next Boss《新一代接班人之殺戮江湖》			
2005	Set Up	Ted		
2005	The Sequence of Underground《街頭風雲之地下秩序》	Tak		
2009	Turning Point	Leung Siu-tong / Laughing Gor 梁笑棠 / Laughing哥		
2010	72 Tenants of Prosperity	Laughing Gor Laughing哥		
2010	Pleasant Goat and Big Big Wolf: The Tiger Prowess	Big Big Wolf (Cantonese voice) 灰太狼 (粵語版配音)		
2010	Kung Fu Hip-Hop 2《精舞門2》	Ran Qiu 冉秋		
2011	I Love Hong Kong	'87 Gang leader 87年江湖大佬		
2011	Moon Castle: The Space Adventure	Big Big Wolf (Cantonese voice) 灰太狼 (粵語版配音)		
2011	The Fortune Buddies	Brother Wah 華哥		
2011	Turning Point 2	Leung Siu-tong / Laughing Gor 梁笑棠 / Laughing哥		
2013	I Love Hong Kong 2013	Ha Sek-sam (Youth) 夏石森（青年）		
2013	Badges of Fury	Yao Yiwei 姚一偉		
2014	Golden Brother	Chow Seung-tak 周常德		
2015	An Inspector Calls	Super waiter		
2015	Full Strike	Inspector Cheung		
2015	Wild City	George Cheung 蔣家興		
2015	Jian Bing Man	Himself		
2016	Three			
2018	Golden Job	Bill Leung		
2018	L Storm	Tik Wai-kit 狄偉杰		
2018	Legends of the Three Kingdoms			
2020	The Infernal Walker	Ting Cheuk-fei 丁卓飛		
2021	G Storm	Siu Cheuk-ngah 肖卓亞		
2021	Anti Racing Action	Ching Chi-fei 程志飛		
2023	72 Hour Gold Operation	Tong Fei唐飛		
2023	Endless Battle	Pang Kin-chung 彭健忠		
2024	Lost but Win	Wah 阿華		

== Film and TV series theme songs ==
- I'm the Boss (我話事), theme song for Young and Dangerous (1996)
- Blade Light Sword Shadow (刀光劍影) with Ekin Cheng, sub theme song for Young and Dangerous (1996)
- 100% Girl (百分之百的女孩), sub theme song for Young and Dangerous (1996)
- Confidant Myself (知己 自己) with Ekin Cheng, theme song for Young and Dangerous 2 (1996)
- Cunning (古古惑惑) with Jason Chu and Jerry Lamb, sub theme song for Young and Dangerous 2 (1996)
- Love Today Went Through (愛情今天經過), sub theme song for Growing Up (1996)
- The Era of Eating and Drinking (吃喝時代), theme song for God of Cookery (1999)
- Black and White Rhythm (黑白變奏) with Ron Ng and Sammul Chan, theme song for E.U. (2009).
- Savour (細味), theme song for The Season of Fate (2010).
- A Man's Diary (大丈夫日記) with Michael Miu, theme song for My Better Half (2010).
- I Will Wait For You (我等你) with Kate Tsui, sub theme song for Relic of an Emissary (2011).
- Walk Alone (獨行), theme song for Lives of Omission (2011)
- Center Point (中心點) with Niki Chow, theme song for Sergeant Tabloid (2012)
- Return Heart (還心) with Ma Zihan, theme song for Hero (2012)
- Seemingly Imaginary Life (疑幻人生) with Sammy Leung, theme song for Friendly Fire (2012)
- Life of Attack (狙擊人生), theme song for Sniper Standoff (2013)
- Bro (一起衝一起闖), with Ekin Cheng, Jordan Chan, Chin Ka-lok and Jerry Lamb, theme song for Golden Job (2018)

== Awards and nominations ==
Year	Award	Category	Nominated work	Results	Ref.
2006	TVB Anniversary Awards	Most Improved Male Artiste	La Femme Desperado	Nominated	
2008	2007 Astro Wah Lai Toi Drama Awards	My Favourite Actor in a Leading Role	La Femme Desperado	Nominated	
2008	TVB Anniversary Awards	Most Popular Male Character	The Money-Maker Recipe	Nominated	

Awards and achievements
TVB Anniversary Awards
Preceded by Wayne Lai for The Gentle Crackdown II	Best Supporting Actor; 2009 for E.U.	Succeeded by Evergreen Mak for No Regrets
Power Academy Awards
Preceded by Tavia Yeung for Moonlight Resonance	Performance Power Award; 2009 for E.U.	Succeeded by Charmaine Sheh for Can't Buy Me Love
