= 2011 My AOD Favourites Awards =

- Date: 27 November 2011
- Location: Suria KLCC

Television/radio coverage
- Network: Astro On Demand
- Produced by: Astro, TVBI

The 2011 My AOD Favourites Awards (simplified Chinese: MY AOD我的最爱颁奖典礼2011; traditional Chinese: MY AOD我的最愛頒獎典禮2011), presented by Astro in Malaysia, was an awards ceremony that recognised the best Hong Kong TVB television drama series that had aired on Malaysia's Astro On Demand (AOD) in 2011.

The ceremony took place on 27 November 2011 at the Suria KLCC in Kuala Lumpur, Malaysia. Astro first broadcast the award show on AOD on 3 December 2011 at 20:30 MST.

== Winners and nominees ==
Top five nominees are in bold.

My Favourite Drama Series	
**Ghetto Justice**; **The Other Truth**; **Lives of Omission**; **Men with No Shadows**; **Forensic Heroes III**; Gun Metal Grey; The Rippling Blossom; Yes, Sir. Sorry, Sir!; The Life and Times of a Sentinel; River of Wine; Super Snoops; Curse of the Royal Harem	
My Favourite Actor in a Leading Role	My Favourite Actress in a Leading Role
**Kevin Cheng as Law Lik-ah in Ghetto Justice**; **Ruco Chan as Keith Lau in The Other Truth**; **Michael Tse as "Laughing" Leung Siu-tong in Lives of Omission**; **Raymond Lam as Toi Fung in Men with No Shadows**; **Wayne Lai as Jack Po in Forensic Heroes III**; Julian Cheung as Yu Chi-ying in The Rippling Blossom; Moses Chan as Law Yiu-wah in Yes, Sir. Sorry, Sir!; Roger Kwok as Eugene Yung in Wax and Wane; Steven Ma as Nip Dor-po in The Life and Times of a Sentinel; Bosco Wong as Michael So in Lives of Omission; Ron Ng as Lee Chin-fung in Forensic Heroes III	**Myolie Wu as Tunggiya Yuen-yuen in Curse of the Royal Harem**; **Linda Chung as Koo Ka-lam in Yes, Sir. Sorry, Sir!**; **Tavia Yeung as Mavis Hong in The Other Truth**; **Fala Chen as Jodie Chau in Lives of Omission**; **Maggie Cheung Ho-yee as Mandy Chung in Forensic Heroes III**; Louise Lee as Chong Sze-tim in Only You; Yoyo Mung as Mandy Mak in Only You; Liu Xuan as Mok Kwai-lan in Grace Under Fire; Liza Wang as Sun Chiu-tung in Super Snoops; Kate Tsui as Ada Ling in Forensic Heroes III; Jessica Hsuan as Niohuru Yee-lan in Curse of the Royal Harem
My Favourite Actor in a Supporting Role	My Favourite Actress in a Supporting Role
**Raymond Wong Ho-yin as Chow Ka-sing in Twilight Investigation**; **Jazz Lam as George Mike Jr. in Ghetto Justice**; **Damian Lau as Harry Kung in Lives of Omission**; **Ben Wong as "Lat Keung" Tang Kwok-ban in Lives of Omission**; **Edwin Siu as Ken Ho in Forensic Heroes III**; Mak Cheung-ching as Chong Sze-chai in Only You; Dominic Lam as Lui Kong in Grace Under Fire; Louis Yuen as James Wai in The Other Truth; Power Chan as Kangxi Emperor in The Life and Times of a Sentinel; Ngo Ka-nin as Sung Chi-tsun in River of Wine; KK Cheung as Mok Yat-lit in Lives of Omission; Joel Chan as Min-yan, the Prince Sui in Curse of the Royal Harem	**Sharon Chan as Ho Li-ching in Ghetto Justice**; **Nancy Wu as Sze Hui in Gun Metal Grey**; **Natalie Tong as Cecilia Pun in The Other Truth**; **Aimee Chan as Angel Chiang in Forensic Heroes III**; **Elena Kong as Ding Ka-pik in River of Wine**; Kristal Tin as Phoebe Szeto in Only You; Queenie Chu as Koo Ka-sin in Yes, Sir. Sorry, Sir!; Toby Leung as Ho Ka-moon in Wax and Wane; Selena Li as Cheuk Chi-ying / Princess Duen-man in The Life and Times of a Sentinel; Sire Ma as Tsang Yuk-fong in River of Wine; Gigi Wong as Sung Chor-kiu in Men with No Shadows; Kiki Sheung as Lam King-suet in Super Snoops
My Favourite Promising Actor	My Favourite Promising Actress
**Vincent Wong as Carson Ko in Gun Metal Grey**; Lai Lok-yi as Cheung King-yuen in Only You; Jazz Lam as George Mike Jr. in Ghetto Justice; King Kong Lee as Lui King-chau in Super Snoops; Edwin Siu as Ken Ho in Forensic Heroes III	**Nancy Wu as Sze Hui in Gun Metal Grey**; Sharon Chan as Ho Lee-ching in Ghetto Justice; Selena Li as Cheuk Chi-ying / Princess Duen-man in The Life and Times of a Sentinel; Sire Ma as Tsang Yuk-fong in River of Wine; Mandy Wong as Vicky Mung in Lives of Omission
My Favourite Drama Theme Song	My Favourite On-Screen Couple
**"Walking Alone" (独行) by Michael Tse — Lives of Omission**; "How Deep Is the Ocean?" (究竟海有几深) by Julian Cheung — The Rippling Blossom; "No Time for Regrets" (没时间后悔) by Hanjin Tan and MC Jin — Ghetto Justice; "Refine with Fire" (试炼) by Raymond Lam — Men with No Shadows; "Resign to Fate" (各安天命) by Susanna Kwan — Curse of the Royal Harem	**Fala Chen and Michael Tse in Lives of Omission**; Nancy Wu and Vincent Wong in Gun Metal Grey; Myolie Wu and Julian Cheung in The Rippling Blossom; Myolie Wu and Kevin Cheng in Ghetto Justice; Kate Tsui and Bosco Wong in Lives of Omission
My Top 15 Favourite Drama Characters	
Julian Cheung as Yu Chi-ying in The Rippling Blossom; Moses Chan as Law Yiu-wah in Yes, Sir. Sorry, Sir!; Linda Chung as Koo Ka-lam in Yes, Sir. Sorry, Sir!; Kevin Cheng as Law Lik-ah in Ghetto Justice; Ruco Chan as Keith Lau in The Other Truth; Tavia Yeung as Mavis Hong in The Other Truth; Kenneth Ma as Fuk-tsuen, the Prince Yu in The Life and Times of a Sentinel; Michael Tse as "Laughing" Leung Siu-tong in Lives of Omission; Fala Chen as Jodie Chau in Lives of Omission; Bosco Wong as Michael So in Lives of Omission; Wayne Lai as Jack Po in Forensic Heroes III; Kate Tsui as Ada Ling in Forensic Heroes III; Ron Ng as Lee Chin-fung in Forensic Heroes III; Myolie Wu as Tunggiya Yuen-yuen in Curse of the Royal Harem	
