= Bobo Hui =

Hong Kong artist

- 許碧姬
- Born: January 23, 1931 (age 95); Shantou, Kwangtung, Republic of China
- Children: 4

Bobo Hui Pik-Kee (Chinese: 許碧姬, born 23 January 1931), is a veteran supporting actor in Hong Kong. She is a TV special actor mainly in TVB dramas. She has also acted for Hong Kong Television.

Her more notable roles include Leung Sei (Fourth Wife) in the 2009 TVB drama Rosy Business and Guat Ma in the 2010 TVB drama No Regrets.

== Background ==
In 1946, Hui moved with her parents from Shantou to Hong Kong. As she exceeded the age limit for regular schooling, she enrolled in an English-language night school. She later participated in a Teochew drama troupe organized by a friend at Radio Hong Kong, where she provided Teochew-language dubbing for films. She subsequently became the host of "First Time in Hong Kong", a program aimed at helping Teochew migrants adapt to life in Hong Kong.

In the second half of 2016, Hoi fell at home and fractured her leg, which has caused her to have difficulty in moving in recent years. As she needs crutches, she reduced her filming.
