= Without Words =

Without Words may refer to:

- Without Words (film), a 2006 Hong Kong romantic drama film
- Without Words (album), a 2013 remix album by Bethel Music

== See also ==
- Without Words: Synesthesia, a 2015 remix album by Bethel Music
- Without Words: Genesis, a 2019 remix album by Bethel Music
