= Karma (Hong Kong TV series) =

- Genre: Horror
- Created by: Alfred Yip; Benjamin Au
- Written by: Alfred Yip; Francis Fung; Fok Yuen-Kwan; Paula Yuen
- Directed by: Benjamin Au
- Starring: Dominic Lam; Noel Leung; Leila Tong; Lawrence Chou; Felix Lok; Kwok Fung; Eddie Li; Emily Wong
- Country of origin: Hong Kong
- Original language: Cantonese
- No. of episodes: 9

Production
- Production location: Hong Kong
- Running time: 41–57 minutes
- Production company: Hong Kong Television Network

Original release
- Release: 29 April – 11 May 2015

Karma (Chinese: 驚異世紀) is a 2015 Hong Kong horror television series produced by Hong Kong Television Network. The first episode premiered on 29 April 2015.

== Cast ==
- Dominic Lam as Lam Kwok-leung
- Noel Leung as Chow Siu-kuen
- Leila Tong as Michelle Fong
- Lawrence Chou as Ken Wan
- Felix Lok as To Fung
- Kwok Fung as Suen Chun-yee
- Eddie Li as Jason Tse
- Emily Wong as Amanda Chin
- Alan Luk as Lee Kai-fat
- Chow Tsz-lung as the son of Lam Kwok-leung

== Song list ==
- "藍蝴蝶" by Eva Chan (Episode 7 and 8)
