= Beyond the Rainbow (TV series) =

- Written by: Tai Tek-kwong; Chan Hor-Yee; Chong Yok-see; Lau Chee-ling; Lui Siu-ming; Chong Yuen-ping
- Directed by: Wong Kwok-keung
- Starring: Ha Yu; Paw Hee-ching; Felix Wong; Leila Tong; Calvin Lui; Emily Kwan; Savio Tsang; Philip Keung; Lam Lei; Cherry Pau; Oscar Chan
- Opening theme: "Beneath the Lion Rock" by Eva Chan
- Ending theme: "一些往事" by Eva Chan
- Country of origin: Hong Kong
- Original language: Cantonese
- No. of episodes: 15

Production
- Executive producer: Lau Kar-pik
- Production location: Hong Kong
- Editor: Leung Man-wah
- Camera setup: Multi-camera
- Production company: Hong Kong Television Network

Original release
- Release: 12 May – 1 June 2015

Beyond the Rainbow (Chinese: 歲月樓情) is a 2015 Hong Kong slice of life drama television series produced by Hong Kong Television Network. The series was condensed into 15 episodes from 30. The first episode premiered on 12 May 2015.

== Cast ==
- Ha Yu as Tam Kam-shing
- Paw Hee-ching as Choi Yung
- Felix Wong as Tam Koon-hung
  - Calvin Lui as young Tam Koon-hung
- Leila Tong as Kwok ching-man / Kelly Yeung Ka-lei
- Emily Kwan as Anita Ting
  - Yetta Tse as young Anita Ting
- Savio Tsang as Victor Ting
- Philip Keung as Luk Ho-cheung
- Lam Lei as Wong Yau-fai
  - Nick Chong as young Wong Yau-fei
- Cherry Pau as Joey Luk
- Oscar Chan as Kenson Tam
- Lee Fung as Mrs. Kan
- Charles Ying as Ko Ching
- Dexter Young as Wong Shue-ban
- Janice Ting as Ivy
- Luvin Ho as To Kuen
- Anita Kwan as Wan Chi-yau
- Eddie Li as Terry Fok
- Kwok Fung as Yeung Ka-lei's father
- Maggie Wong as Ho Mei-yan
- Chan On-ying as Mrs. Ho
- Alan Luk as news reporter
- Casper Chan as nurse
- Eunice Ho as nurse

== Release ==
A 10-minute preview was released on HKTV's YouTube channel on 5 May 2015.
