= Kwok Fung =

Hong Kong actor (born 1951)

Samuel Kwok Fung
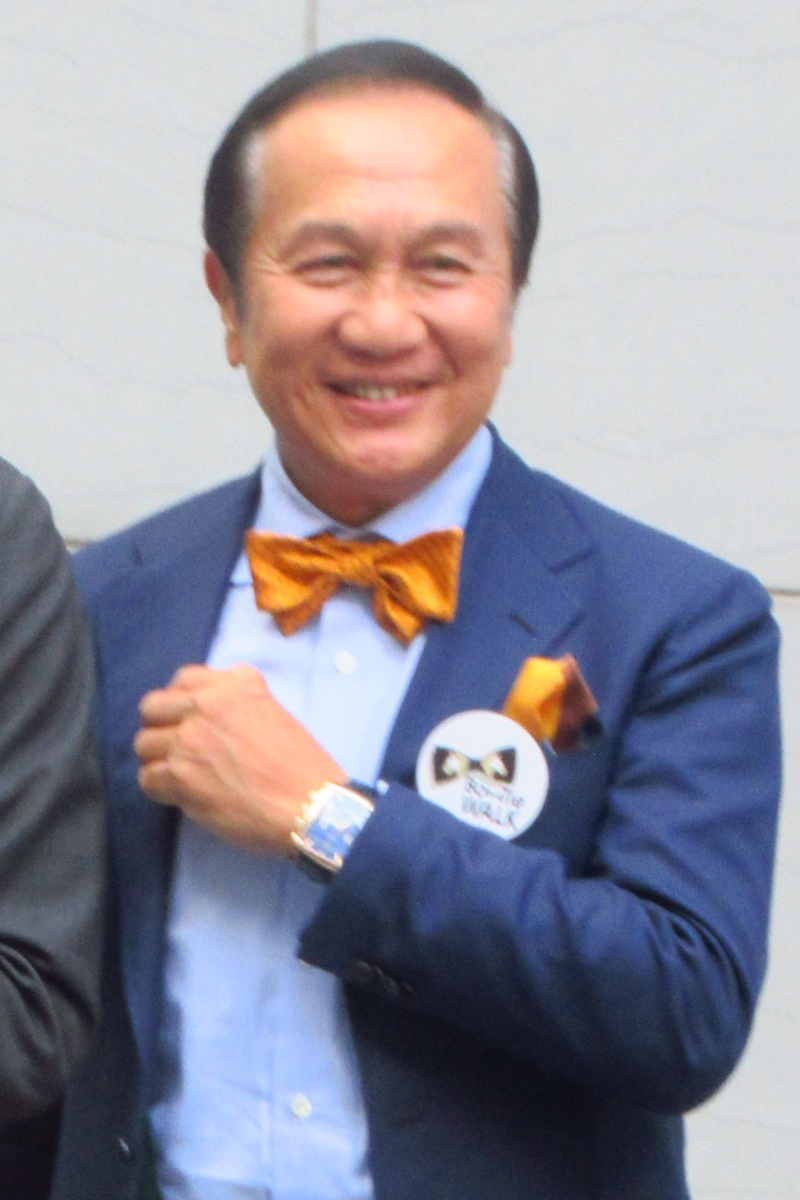
- Samuel Kwok Fung 郭鋒 in 2018
- Born: Kwok Man Fu (郭民富); 27 October 1951 (age 74); British Hong Kong Ancestral hometown: Qingyuan city (淸遠市)，Guangdong province, mainland China
- Occupations: television actor, film actor
- Years active: 1970 - present
- Agent: TVB (1974-1990, 1998-2012)
- Spouse: Susanna Au Yeung (歐陽珮珊) (m. 1977; died 2017)

Chinese name
- Traditional Chinese: 郭鋒
- Simplified Chinese: 郭峰
Transcriptions
- Website: https://www.susannaauyeung.com/kwokfung.htm

Kwok Fung (born 27 October 1951 in Hong Kong) is a veteran actor from Hong Kong. He graduated the first training of TVB in 1971.

== Filmography ==
=== Film ===
- S Storm (2016)
- Raging Fire (2021)

=== Television ===
Year	Title	Role	Notes
2017	Princess Agents	Yuwen Zhuo	
2015	Night Shift		
2015	P4B		
2015	The Wicked League		
2015	Beyond the Rainbow	Yeung Ka-lei's father	
2015	Karma	Suen Chun-yee	
2015	Sexpedia	Kuk Choi-yi's father	
2015	The Menu	Kwan Chi-wai	
2015	Second Life	Cheung Kai-gam	
2015	Incredible Mama	Fok Dak-wah	
2014-2015	The Election	Ho Chung-bak	
2012	King Maker	Emperor Ningzong of Song	Tvb series
2012	House of Harmony and Vengeance	Tai Tou	Tvb series
2011-2012	Bottled Passion	Ko Siu-tong	Tvb series
2011	Curse of the Royal Harem	Mukcheung-or	Tvb series
2011	River of Wine	Sung To (宋濤)	Tvb series
2011	The Life and Times of a Sentinel	Nip Koon-yat (聶貫一)	Tvb series
2011	7 Days in Life	Fong Kwok-keung (方國強)	Tvb series
2011	Ghetto Justice	Mai Bo (米布)	Tvb series
2010	Can't Buy Me Love	Emperor Taizong of Tang	Tvb series
2010	Every Move You Make	Wong Tin-wing (黃天榮)	Tvb series
2010	No Regrets	Cheng Long Hung	Tvb series
2010	When Lanes Merge	Ngai Chiu-fat (魏潮發)	Tvb series
2010	OL Supreme	Ling Tok (凌鐸)	Tvb series
2009-2010	A Watchdog's Tale	Chou Wai-Wai (周偉威)	Tvb series
2009-2010	The Beauty of the Game	Chiu Kai-hung	Tvb series
2009	D.I.E. Again	Lo Yau Hang (Lo Sir)(羅有恆)	Tvb series
2009	In the Chamber of Bliss		Tvb series
2009	Rosy Business	Prince	Tvb series
2009	E.U.	Lam Sen Beng (林順耕)	Tvb series
2009	A Chip Off the Old Block	Ching Yan (程仁)	Tvb series
2009	Beyond the Realm of Conscience	Ko Yiu-On (高耀安)	Tvb series
2009	Sweetness in the Salt	Wu Kin (胡坚)	Tvb series. Release overseas on January 5, 2009.
2009	Man in Charge		Tvb series
2008	When Easterly Showers Fall on the Sunny West	Poon Siu Tong (潘兆棠)	Tvb series
2008	When a Dog Loves a Cat	Chow Bat-Kau (周不苟)	Tvb series
2008	A Journey Called Life	Sze Lap-Ji (施立志)	Tvb series
2007-2008	Survivor's Law II	Suen Pak-To (孫伯滔)	Tvb series
2007	Men Don't Cry	Ling Long (凌龍)	Tvb series
2007	Steps	Yeung Hon-To (Tom) (楊漢滔)	Tvb series
2007	A Change of Destiny	Emperor Taizu of Song	Tvb series
2007	War and Destiny	Lit Wun Shan (聶泓山)	Tvb series
2007	The Drive of Life	Sung Hok Li (宋學禮)	Tvb series
2007	On The First Beat	Lam Shun Gang (林順耕)	Tvb series
2007	Best Bet	Ho Nin (賀年)	Tvb series
2007	The Slicing of the Demon	Kong Yuk Shu (江玉書)	Tvb series
2006	Safe Guards	Surng Ching Tong (尚正堂)	Tvb series. Nominated - TVB Anniversary Award for Best Supporting Actor (Top 15)
2006	Summer Heat	Sui Wai Choi (水偉才)	Tvb series
2006	Land of Wealth	Chai Ngai (柴毅)	Tvb series
2006	Placebo Cure	Gu Yin (顧言)	Tvb series
2006	The Price of Greed	Lam Sai Fung (藍世鳳)	Tvb series
2006	A Pillow Case of Mystery		Tvb series
2006	Lethal Weapons of Love and Passion		Tvb series
2006	Dicey Business	Ko Ming (高名)	Tvb series
2006	Greed Mask	Szeto Pak Nin (司徒柏年)	Tvb series
2001	A Step into the Past	Lui But-wai (呂不偉)	TVB series
2000	At the Threshold of an Era II	David Fok King-leung (霍景良)	TVB series
1999	At the Threshold of an Era	David Fok King-leung (霍景良)	TVB series
1988	The Formidable Lady From Shaolin	Tantric Prajna Dharma King	TVB series
1985	Take Care, Your Highness!		TVB series
