= Eddie Li =

Hong Kong actor

Edwin Li Yu-yeung (traditional Chinese: 李雨陽; simplified Chinese: 李雨阳) is a Hong Kong model and actor.

He made his first appearance in Hearts Of Fencing on TVB in 2003, in which he played a rich kid who thought he was all that because he had so much money, a character that resembles (or probably based on) Tsukasa Domyoji (Dao Ming Si) in Hana Yori Dango (Meteor Garden). In Hearts Of Fencing, his character had a crush on Race Wong, but throughout the series his character changes and he ends up in a couple with Natalie Tong.

== Television ==
- Hearts of Fencing (2003)
- The Academy (2005)
- Revolving Doors of Vengeance (2005)
- Forensic Heroes (2006)
- Heart of Greed (2007)
- The Seventh Day (2008)
- Forensic Heroes II (2008)
- Your Class or Mine (2008)
- Last One Standing (2008)
- Burning Flame III (2009)
- In the Eye of the Beholder (2010)
- The Comeback Clan (2010)
- Dropping By Cloud Nine (2011)
- Only You (2011)
- Grace Under Fire (2011)
- Relic of an Emissary (2011)
- My Sister of Eternal Flower (2011)
- Ghetto Justice (2011)
- Lives of Omission (2011)
- Super Snoops (2011)
- Til Love Do Us Lie (2011)
- Daddy Good Deeds (2012)
- Sergeant Tabloid (2012)
- Tiger Cubs (2012)
- Witness Insecurity (2012)
- The Last Steep Ascent (2012)
- The Menu (2015)
- Sexpedia (2015)
- Karma (2015)
- IPCC Files 2015 (2015)
- Beyond the Rainbow (2015)
- Hidden Faces (2015)

== Film ==
- Infernal Affairs 3
