= The Election =

2014 Hong Kong drama series

- Genre: Political drama
- Written by: Wong Wai-keung
- Directed by: Wong Kwok-keung
- Starring: Angelica Lee; Liu Kai-chi; Gregory Wong; Kwok Fung; Violet Li
- Opening theme: "I'll Be There" by Eva Chan
- Country of origin: Hong Kong
- Original language: Cantonese
- No. of seasons: 1
- No. of episodes: 15

Production
- Production location: Hong Kong
- Camera setup: Multi-camera
- Running time: 44–69 minutes
- Production company: Hong Kong Television Network

Original release
- Release: 19 November 2014 – 21 February 2015

The Election
- Traditional Chinese: 選戰
- Simplified Chinese: 选战
- Literal meaning: Election campaign
Transcriptions
Standard Mandarin
- Hanyu Pinyin: Xuǎnzhàn
Yue: Cantonese
- Jyutping: syun2 zin3

The Election (Chinese: 選戰) is a political drama series produced by Hong Kong Television Network (HKTV). With a budget of HK$15 million, filming started in July 2014 and wrapped up on 28 October 2014. Popularly voted to be the inaugural drama of HKTV, the first episode premiered on 19 November 2014, and the remaining episodes were broadcast every Saturday. A second season was initially planned to start filming in February 2015 but was eventually postponed indefinitely.

== Plot summary ==
With the failure of democratic movements such as the 2014 protests, the election of Chief Executive in 2017 is a hybrid universal suffrage: one has to obtain 600 votes from the 2400-member Nominating Committee to stand as an official candidate. Wai Man-hin (Poon Chan-leung), non-partisan candidate, is killed in a car accident on the day he wins the Chief Executive election. In the coming years, Wai's widow, Yip Ching (Angelica Lee), becomes an activist for labour rights.

As the 2022 Chief Executive election approaches, Luk Wai-tou (Savio Tsang), DNRA-backed candidate, is embroiled in an extramarital scandal. While DNRA continues to back Luk under the pressure of a mainland official Wang, Sung Man-san (Liu Kai-chi), President of the Legislative Council and Chairman of DNRA, is ambitious and tries to replace Luk. Meanwhile, Yip is persuaded by Cheung Gwai-lung (Gregory Wong) into following her late husband's footsteps and participating in the election.

With the increase in the maximum election expenses, prospective candidates have to rely more on sponsors of local tycoons, who are mostly supportive of the government and pro-government DNRA. After appointing Cheung as her election adviser, Yip eventually receives sponsor and nominating votes, but refuses to co-operate with HKMG, Hong Kong's leading media group. Sung fabricates evidence of Luk's affairs to weaken Luk's popularity, but Wang still supports a now-reluctant Luk to stand for the election. Luk discovers that Sung is behind all his scandals but is killed and then replaced by Sung in despair.

Cheung rejects Sung's invitation to return to DNRA and is framed for a rape. Although the charge against Cheung is dropped, Yip loses several nominating votes and has to turn to the Heung Yee Kuk for help. However, unbeknownst to Yip, her meeting with a rural strongman is used by DNRA and HKMG as evidence of her linkage to the Triads. Shortly, Yip joins the Democratic and Liberal Party (DLP), of which her late father is a co-founder, amidst its fierce intraparty conflict; with the Young Turks' support, Yip beats chairman Ho Chung-bak (Kwok Fung) in the party's primary election. Sung Man-san, now diagnosed with brain cancer, and Yip Ching become official Chief Executive candidates.

A hostage taker demands a conversation with Yip and surrenders himself to the police afterward. Nevertheless, a hostage dies from heart attack. HKMG collaborates with DRNA to blame the victim's death on Yip and discredit her. While it becomes clear that HKMG leans towards DRNA, its journalists Kei Man-wai (Isabel Chan) becomes Sung's sex partner and Poon Tsz-wan (Eunice Ho) leaves to set up an online radio station.

To further weaken Yip's camp, Sung attempts to lure a disgruntled Ho into tearing DLP apart, but is stopped when Yip threatens Sung with his wife's extramarital sex tape. Kong Yat-tung, DRNA's secretary-general, reveals himself to the source of the video on Wang's order. Despite suffering from a fall in support, Yip receives a territory-wide signatory support and decides to stay in the election campaign.

Sung's attacks on Yip continue. First, he convinces Tsui Kam-chuen, a radical activist whose offer for coalition was rejected by Yip, to withdraw his support for Yip and launch a blank-vote movement. Second, he releases his own wife's sex tape to HKMG and then blames Yip for her suicidal attempt. Third, he makes HKMG fabricate an intimate relationship between Yip and Cheung. Fourth, he demands Yip has to be absent in the televised debate in exchange for the truth behind her husband's death. As Sung starts to show signs of deteriorating health in public, he forces his personal doctor into exile to conceal his illness. A scandal-embroiled Cheung flies to Taiwan to track down the doctor.

While the ballots are being counted, Sung falls in coma and Cheung is assaulted. The fates of Sung, Yip and Cheung remain unknown.

== Cast ==
- Angelica Lee as Yip Ching
- Liu Kai-chi as Sung Man-san
- Gregory Wong as Cheung Gwai-lung
- Kwok Fung as Ho Chung-bak
- Violet Li as Sam Suet-lai
- Savio Tsang as Luk Wai-tou
- Mimi Kung as Lee Tsz-kwan
- Isabel Chan as Kei Man-wai
- Yeung Ying-wai as Kong Yat-dung
- Shek Sau as CK, guest star
- Poon Chan-leung as Wai Man-hin
- Casper Chan as Eva
- Bryant Mak as Mark
- Calvin Hei as Henry
- Cherry Pau as Siu Jan-tim
- Tong Chun-ming as Chan Gin-yau
- Eunice Ho as Poon Chi-wan
- Felix Lok as Cheuk Tin-fan
- Luvin Ho as Tse Mei-mei, episode 5 and 6
- Peter Lai as Sing Chi-koeng, episode 7
- Wong Man-piu as Leung Yat-hong, episode 7
- Alan Luk as Fong Kai-chiu
- Anita Kwan as Mary
- Oscar Chan as Kelvin, episode 7 and 8
- Wu Kwing-lung as Lee Kai-hou, episode 9 to 11
- Eva Chan as herself (cameo appearance), episode 9 and 10
- Candy Chu, episode 10 and 11
- Simon Lo as Lin Chi-yun, episode 11 and 12
- Daniel Kwok as Hui Kam-cyun, episode 12 to 15
