= Ella Koon =

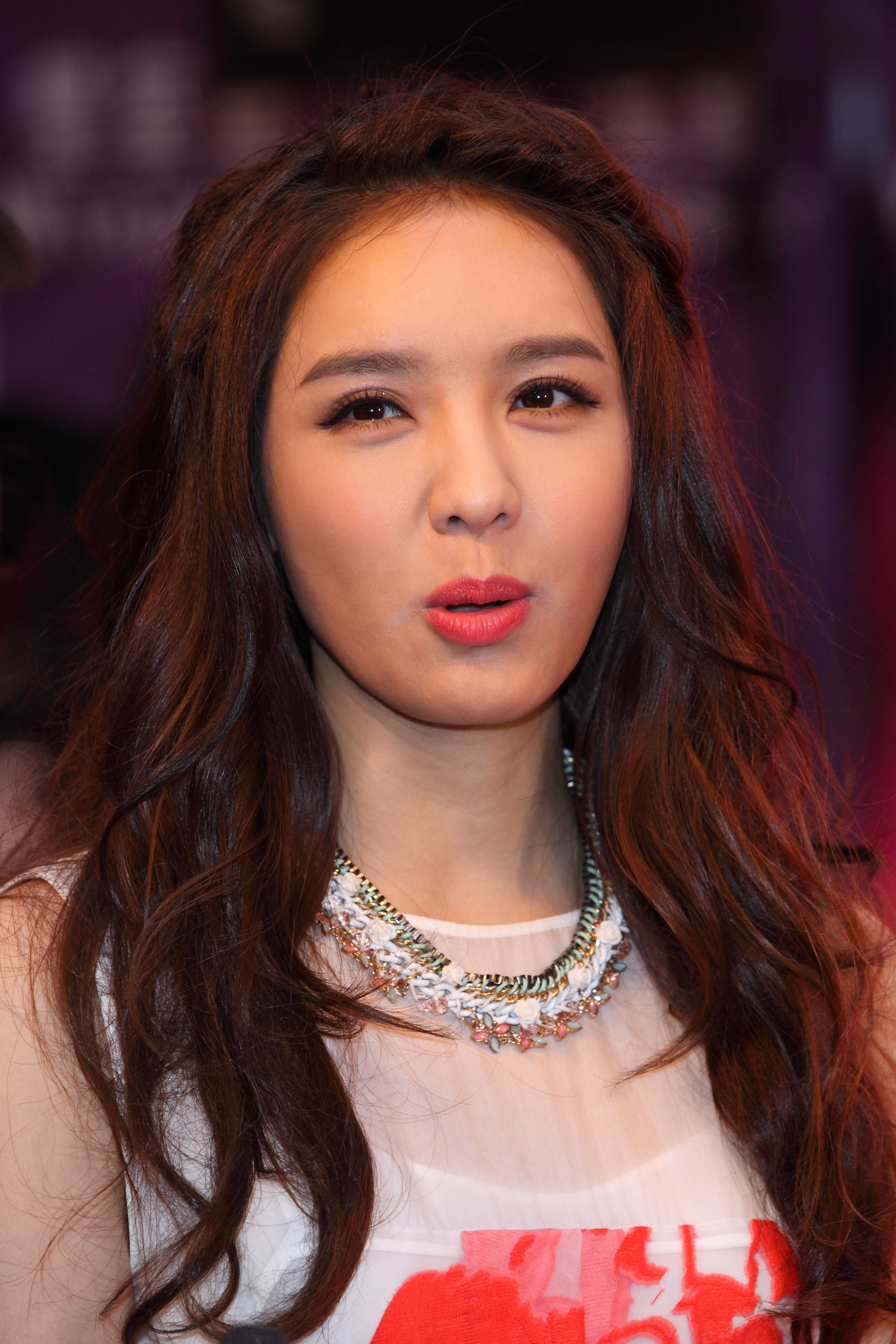
- Koon in 2014
- Born: Ella Koon Yun-na; 9 July 1979 (age 47); Tahiti, French Polynesia, France
- Occupations: Singer; actress; model
- Years active: 1999–2015
- Spouse: Juan-Domingo Maurellet (m. 2015)
- Children: 2

Chinese name
- Traditional Chinese: 官恩娜
Transcriptions
Standard Mandarin
- Hanyu Pinyin: Guān Ēnnà
Yue: Cantonese
- Jyutping: Gun1 Jan1 Naa4
- Musical career
- Origin: Hong Kong
- Genres: Cantopop; pop rock
- Instruments: Vocals; guitar; piano; drums
- Label: Warner Music

Ella Koon Yun-na (born 9 July 1979) is a former Hong Kong Cantopop singer and semi-retired actress.

== Biography ==
Ella Koon was born in the French Polynesian island of Tahiti, and is of Hakka descent. She was raised in Hong Kong and attended high school in Birmingham, England. Koon is multilingual and speaks Hakka, Cantonese, English, Mandarin, and some French. Koon also plays the Guzheng, a traditional Chinese musical instrument with 21 strings, as well as the Guitar and Piano. She is not a French citizen.

== Entertainment career ==
After completing her studies in England, Koon returned to Hong Kong in 2000 where she began her modeling career for various magazines, advertisements and commercials. Modelling became her full-time profession.

In 2001, she landed her first movie role in "I Do". After the movie, she continued modelling; then in 2004 she was invited to attend a singing audition. The audition landed her a contract with Boombeat Music and launched her singing career. Her first few albums – "Original", "Ellacadabra" (2005), "Lose Sanity" (2006) and the EP "Stages" (2008) were not particularly acclaimed. But as a singer on The Voice (超級巨聲) singing "Endless Love" she impressed audiences and further propelled her singing career.

Koon also starred in the popular TVB's drama series "Revolving Door of Vengeance" in 2005 and "Survivor's Law II " in 2007. In "Revolving Door of Vengeance" she played "Hoi Sum" (meaning 'happy' in Cantonese), a carefree and happy-go-lucky girl. In "Survivor's Law II," she won the audience again with her character as "Lily" the sassy and stylish lawyer who could hold her own in the courtroom. Besides the drama series, Koon has been invited as a guest to several TVB games shows and was a host for two food travel shows with notable Hong Kong Chefs. Indeed, her most recent work with Kelvin Pan (Pan Kai Tai) has boosted her into the pinnacle of Hong Kong entertainment business.

"I Do" was just the first of many movies Koon appeared and started in. She also landed roles in movies such as My Sweetie (甜絲絲, 2004), Drink, Drank, Drunk (千杯不醉, 2005), Ice Age 2: The Meltdown (冰河世紀二, 2006), The Shopaholics (最愛女人購物狂, 2006), Without Words (地老天荒, 2006), Undercover Hidden Dragon (至尊無賴, 2006), Arthur and the Minimoys (迷你魔界大冒險, 2007), Muddy but Pure White (泥巴色的純白, 2008), Playboy Cops (花花型警, 2008), Look for a Star (游龍戲鳳, 2008), Short of Love (矮仔多情, 2009) and Ice Age 3: Dawn of the Dinosaurs (冰河世紀三, 2009). She Played the role of Merry in the Clement Cheng movie 'Merry-go-round' (2010) in which her talent expresses perfectly.

Between 2010 and 2012, Koon became the first ever Asian GoDaddy Girl and was featured on the front page of the GoDaddy site for all Asian users. She was supported by DotAsia's coordination.

== Incident ==
In 2006, during promoting a Mid-Autumn Festival event, Koon was assaulted on stage by a man, later identified as Kalton Pan, a 22-year-old male. The man was immediately arrested and later sentenced to 9 months imprisonment. Koon was not harmed by the incident and decided against pursuing legal action against the man.

In September 2014, Koon was diagnosed with Bell's palsy, which made her right side of her face paralyzed.

== Discography ==
- Original (2004)
- Ellacadabra (2005)
- Lose Sanity 失常 (2006)
- Stages (2008)
- Being (2010)
- Take A Shine to... (2011)
- Wanna Be (2013)

== Filmography ==
Film
Year	Title	Role	Notes
2000	I Do	Michelle Chung	
2004	My Sweetie	Sea Ko	
2005	Crazy N' the City	Chris's ex-girlfriend	
2005	Drink, Drank, Drunk	"Big Sister" beer girl	
2005	Dragon Tiger Gate	Luosha / Rosa	Cantonese dub
2006	The Shopaholics	Ding Ding-dong	
2006	Without Words	Snow Yip	
2006	Undercover Hidden Dragon	36	
2006	Ice Age: The Meltdown		Cantonese dub
2006	The Heavenly Kings		Cameo (uncredited)
2007	Arthur and the Invisibles		Cantonese dub
2007	Kidnap	Shirley	
2007	Muddy but Pure White		
2008	Playboy Cops	policewoman	
2009	Look for a Star	Chihuahua	
2009	Short of Love	secretary	
2009	Ice Age: Dawn of the Dinosaurs		Cantonese dub
2009	Rebellion	undercover cop	
2010	Here Comes Fortune		
2010	Just Another Pandora's Box	Diao Chan	
2010	Perfect Wedding		
2010	Merry-Go-Round	Merry / Young Eva	
2016	House of Wolves		

Television
Year	Title	Role	Notes
2004	Sunshine Heartbeat	doctor	guest star
2005	The Zone	Gigi	
2005	Medical Detectives	Suet	
2005	Revolving Doors of Vengeance	Lee Hoi-sum	
2006	Love a Flame	Siu Fong	
2007–2008	Survivor's Law II	Lily Suen	
2008	Dressage To Win	cashier	guest star
2008	This is My Home	Yip Gong-on	
2009	Rooms to Let	Bee	
2010	Rooms to Let 2010	Bee	
2011	Only You	Siu Shuk-chu	Introduced in Ep.15
2011	Super Snoops	Chow Kui-yeuk	Introduced in Ep.3
2012	Highs and Lows	Ko Hei Suen	
