= Bear in Mind =

Studio album by Toby Leung
- Released: June 2005
- Genre: Cantopop
- Producer: MusicNation-HK

Bear in Mind is the first album by Toby Leung, and was released in June 2005. It contains 9 tracks and 2 Music Videos.

The tracks on the album are:

Audio Tracks

1. 我們仨 (Us Three)
2. 你是最重要 (You are the most Important)
3. 兌換晴天 (Exchanging Fine Skies)
4. 望星打掛 (Looking at Stars)
5. 熊之戀人 (Bear's Lover)
6. 後宮佳麗 (Palace Wives)
7. 我們仨Remix (Us Three Remix)

MV

1. 我們仨 (Us Three MV)
2. 你是最重要 (You are the most Important MV)
