= Felix Lok =

Hong Kong actor

- Born: Lok Ying-kwan; October 3, 1952 (age 73); Hong Kong
- Occupation: Actor
- Years active: 1976–present

Chinese name
- Traditional Chinese: 駱應鈞
- Simplified Chinese: 骆应钧
Transcriptions
Standard Mandarin
- Hanyu Pinyin: Luò Yīngjūn
- Musical career
- Origin: Hong Kong

Felix Lok Ying-kwan is a Hong Kong actor. His television appearances include roles in Looking Back in Anger, The Drive of Life and The Academy.

== Filmography ==
=== Television series ===
Year	Title	Role
1977	The Water Margin	
1977	A House Is Not a Home	
1982	Demi-Gods and Semi-Devils	Hak-lin Tit-shu
1983	The Return of the Condor Heroes	Lei Chi-seung
1983	The Old Miao Myth	
1984	The Duke of Mount Deer	Yu Pak
1984	The Return of Wong Fei Hung	
1985	The Flying Fox of Snowy Mountain	Shek Meng-Tsen
1985	Sword Stained with Royal Blood	Cho Fa-shun
1985	Take Care, Your Highness!	Ngok-yee-tai
1986	New Heavenly Sword and Dragon Sabre	Do Dai-kam
1987	The Legend of the Book and the Sword	Lei Ho-sau
1989	Looking Back in Anger	
1992	File of Justice	Chow Man Bun
1993	File of Justice II	Chow Man Bun
1994	File of Justice III	Chow Man Bun
1994	The Legend of the Condor Heroes	Wong Yeuk-see
1995	The Condor Heroes 95	Wong Yeuk-see
1995	Detective Investigation Files	
1995	File of Justice IV	Chow Man Bun
1997	File of Justice V	Chow Man Bun
1997	Demi-Gods and Semi-Devils	Muk-yung Bok
1998	Journey to the West II	Elder Jinchi
1999	The Flying Fox of Snowy Mountain	Lei Tsi-sing
2000	The Heaven Sword and Dragon Saber	Tse Shun
2000	Crimson Sabre	Lei Tsi-sing
2002	Golden Faith	Ting Wing-tung
2003	Triumph in the Skies	
2003	The 'W' Files	Kai Say
2005	The Academy	
2005	Just Love	Ko Tin
2005	Revolving Doors of Vengeance	Ng Gam Kuen
2006	C.I.B. Files	
2006	Face to Fate	Go Shu-Tin
2006	Forensic Heroes	Mok Wai-To (guest)
2007	Life Art	
2007	The Drive of Life	Chan Jen Cheung
2008	Wasabi Mon Amour	
2008	The Four	Ling Lok Shi
2008	Sweetness in the Salt	To Ying-Lung
2009	E.U.	Kwok Pui
2009	Just Love II	
2009–2010	The Beauty of the Game	Ko Kai-cheung
2010	The Season of Fate	Lin Yee-Fat
2010	Suspects in Love	Chan Yau Keung (cameo)
2010	Some Day	Shek Yau-shun
2010	Growing Through Life	Mr. Yip
2010	The Comeback Clan	Ngai Chun-chong
2010	Every Move You Make	Yiu Tin-po
2010–2011	Show Me the Happy	
2011	The Rippling Blossom	Yue Fai-wong
2011	Relic of an Emissary	Geng Bingwen
2011	The Other Truth	Yam Kwok-chu
2011	The Life and Times of a Sentinel	Kei Man-cheong
2011	Men with No Shadows	Cheng Ka-wai
2011–2012	When Heaven Burns	Ivan Wong
2012	L'Escargot	Mr. Cheuk
2014	The Borderline	Cheuk Bak-san
2014–2015	The Election	Cheuk Tin-fan
2015	Incredible Mama	Hung Shue-lam
2015	The Menu	Simon Ting
2015	Karma	To Fung
2015	Night Shift	Che Ding

=== Films ===
- Heroes of the Underground (1976)
- The Happenings (1979)
- Sexy Career Girls (1981)
- Lady Cop and Papa Crook (2008)
- Connected (2008)
- Claustrophobia (2008)
- Overheard (2009)
- Overheard 2 (2011)
- Nightfall (2012)
- Tales from the Dark 1 (2013)
- Young and Dangerous: Reloaded (2013)
- Overheard 3 (2014)
- Z Storm (2014)
- From Vegas to Macau II (2015)
- Cold War 2 (2016)
- Shock Wave (2017)
- Project Gutenberg (2018)
- Integrity (2019)
- The Love of Immortal (2019)
