= Night Shift (Hong Kong TV series) =

- Genre: Crime thriller
- Written by: Cheng Sing-mo; Quin Ho; Kevin Lam; Poling Yu; Ferrari Chiang; David Man; Justin Wong; Sun Chan
- Directed by: Jimmy Luk
- Creative director: Stella Choy
- Starring: Frankie Lam; Dominic Lam; Kathy Yuen
- Opening theme: "夜之奏鳴曲"
- Ending theme: "Lonely Shadow" by Quinn Lui
- Composer: Kong Fai
- Country of origin: Hong Kong
- Original language: Cantonese
- No. of episodes: 11

Production
- Executive producer: Ho Ching-yee
- Production location: Hong Kong
- Editor: Alex Pao
- Camera setup: Multi-camera
- Running time: 42–49 minutes
- Production company: Hong Kong Television Network

Original release
- Release: 19 August – 2 September 2015

Night Shift (Chinese: 夜班), is a 2015 crime thriller television series produced by Hong Kong Television Network. The entire series was filmed at night.

== Plot ==
The story links together the experiences of several EU assault team members working different night shifts. During their shifts, they already encounter all kinds of unfathomable dangers and challenges, but the true test of their endurance lies in the endless temptations that they face in the darkness of the night. With their willpower slowly weakening as the night wears on, their self-protection and restraint are also in danger of suffering serious blows.

== Cast ==
=== Emergency Unit ===
- Frankie Lam as Heman
- Dominic Lam as Bao Kuk
- Kwok Fung as Tai Sir
- Luvin Ho as Kit
- Sin Ho-ying as Kai Yet
- Wu Kwing-lung as Tsui Tsai
- Kong Fai as Wong Tze-hang

=== Night club ===
- Kathy Yuen as Aka
- Rachel Lam as Leslie
- Lena Wong as Rainbow
- Ruby Lau as Nana
- Jan Tse as Suki
- Jacky Yeung as Mark
- Benji Chiang as manager of the Bar
- Gregory Wong as guy in the Bar

=== Triads ===
- Bryant Mak as 6 Luck
- Philip Keung as Tai Dan
- Felix Lok as Che Ding
- Bond Chan as Tin Kau

=== Ambulance Unit ===
- Chow Tsz-lung as Yau Yung
- Wong Man-piu as Master Kai
- Jason Lam as Brother Kin

=== 7-Eleven ===
- Crystal Leung as Ah Fa
- Oscar Chan as Jason
- Annie Chong as Sandy

=== Social worker ===
- Tong Chun-ming as Alan
- Bonnie Wong as Grandma 7
- Peter Lai as Tang Bak

=== Other cast ===
- Yetta Tse as Yan
- Alan Luk as Fat Kee
- Deon Cheung as Edwin
- Mizz Eva as Eva
- Ann Ho as Rene
- Anita Chan as Carman
- Cherry Pau as Ho Ying, (episode 7 & 11)

== Production ==
Filming started on 8 September 2013 and ended on 26 November 2013.

== Release ==
A behind the scenes video clip was posted on YouTube on 30 November 2013. The first trailer was released on HKTV's YouTube channel on 26 October 2014. A 9-minute preview was released on HKTV's YouTube channel on 11 August 2015.
