= Dragon Squad =

2005 Hong Kong film by Daniel Lee

- Original theatrical poster
- Directed by: Daniel Lee
- Written by: Daniel Lee; Lau Ho-Leung
- Produced by: Michael Chou
- Starring: Vanness Wu; Shawn Yue; Xia Yu; Eva Huang; Lawrence Chou; Sammo Hung; Maggie Q
- Cinematography: Tony Cheung
- Edited by: Azrael Chung
- Music by: Young Chen; Henry Lai Wan-man
- Distributed by: Media Asia Films
- Release date: 10 November 2005
- Running time: 110 minutes
- Country: Hong Kong
- Languages: Cantonese; English

Dragon Squad (Chinese: 猛龍) is a 2005 Hong Kong action film co-written and directed by Daniel Lee, co-produced by Steven Seagal, and starring Vanness Wu, Sammo Hung, Michael Biehn, Maggie Q, and Simon Yam.

== Plot ==
Interpol agent Wang Sun-Ho states that this is his first mission in a messy laundry hallway filled with fluff as if a gunfight had taken place there. The start shows a team of young INTERPOL agents arriving in Hong Kong to give testimony against recently captured crime boss "Panther" Duen. Among the agents are Officer Wang Sun-Ho, an ex-SWAT officer trained in the United States, two HKPD officers Hung Kei Lok and Pak Yat Suet, ex-PLA sniper Luo Zai-Jun, and ex-SAS operator James "Jie" Lam. They are greeted by Hon Sun, the one in charge of the case. However the escort of Tiger turns into a situation as the older Duen brother, "Tiger" Duen plans to rescue Panther. The rescue attempt is aborted when the agents mistake an innocent civilian as a criminal attempting to break Tiger free and also discover that the convoy they are guarding is a decoy. Tiger's crew pulls out and disappears. The agents commandeer a van, breaking their orders to find the real convoy.

Meanwhile, an HKPD surveillance squad is eliminated by 5 operatives all of whom have military training. Led by the Ex 707th Korean commander Ko Tung Yuen, along with his best friend American Petros Angelo (Former Colombian Armed Forces), Yuet Song a Vietnamese sniper, Joe Pearson another ex-US Navy SEALS and Lee Chun Pei another Korean operative. The real convoy transporting Panther is ambushed and the operatives eliminate 7 officers on the scene. The INTERPOL agents arrive but are unable to prevent their escape due to the operatives training and superior firepower.

Back at the HQ, Commander Hon Sun reprimands the agents for disobeying orders but lets them off the hook. Lok visits his sick brother while off duty, Ho decides to do some of his own investigations and Jun, Jie and Suet are later introduced to Kong Long a retired police officer. It is revealed then that Petros is seeking revenge for the death of his brother Dominic. Kong Long was involved on a mission to take down Dominic and Tiger but because Kong did not wait for backup it resulted in Tiger killing Dominic and the deaths of 6 officers. Later Lok, Ho and Suet save Kong's daughter from a fight in her own restaurant but it is then revealed that Kong's daughter hates him for a past event. The team then practice for their mission by improving their shooting accuracy in a local bar.

After several team introductions and attempts from both sides to getting to know the "players" Captain Ko meets Petros in a cafe to initiate 2 phases of their mission. Ko will attempt to keep tabs on the INTERPOL agents while Petros will attempt to retrieve a microfilm which, for unknown purposes, is their main objective. It is rumoured to be in the hands of Tiger Duen, and the only link is Yu Ching, Tiger's girlfriend. As soon as Ko leaves the cafe, Petro randomly just happens to spot Ho walking down the street. Ho tries to hide his identity by pretending to be a visitor from out of town. Petros then retreats to a fortune teller temple where Ho attempts to take Petros down but Petros escapes using his training.

Petros then finds Yu Ching being bullied and pretends to befriend her, Even letting himself get beaten up by 3 Chinese gangsters who finish their beating by throwing a dumpster on Petros. Yu Ching however is too trusting and even lets Petros into her house.

Meanwhile, it is revealed Ko has a rivalry with Kong which earned him his scar. Ko tries to kill Kong in a locker room with a machete but Kong manages to hold Ko off and Ko is forced to retreat after a team returned back to the station which alerted Ko.

Later Petros, Joe, Lee Chun Pei and Ko meet Tiger for a deal for the microfilm, they even threaten him showing Panther's ear cut of earlier. This only results in a gunfight with the operatives eliminating most of Panther/Tiger's Triads. Ho and Lok arrive on the scene attempting to fight Ko but Ko just defeats them and leaves saying "I don't have time for this" leaving Ho, Lok and Tiger in a Mexican standoff before the HKPD arrests them all. Tiger later gets released on lack of evidence and both Ho and Lok were bailed out by Kong pleading with Hon Sun.

The team then seeks advice from Kong on how to catch the operatives and asks Kong to lead them. Kong however, denies their request due to his trauma of losing his ex-team was still fresh in his memory and he did not want a repeat of what happened to the current team. Kong instead give them tips on how to counter the team that Ko had.

Eventually, Hon Sun prepares a sniper unit, and 3 teams of HKPD officers to ambush the operatives. Petros splits up with Ko after lying to Yu Ching he has to do something. Yuet easily eliminates the snipers, Petros takes out 2 of the HKPD teams and Ko eliminates the HKPD command squad. Hon Sun tries to fight back but is shot without mercy by Petros and is badly wounded.

Having enough of the operatives rampage, Ho, Lok, Jun, Suet and Jie attempt to ambush all the operatives at once. Yuet then engages in firefight with Jun, Petros, Lee Chun Pei and Ko enter a firefight as well against Suet, Jie, Ho and Lok. The operatives change tactics making it harder for the team to kill them. Joe Pearson breaks into a jeep in to evac Petros and Ko. Lee Chun Pei is killed by Suet with an MP5. Just as the battle was unwinding, Jun who was covering Suet gets distracted thinking that the battle is over, unbeknownst that Yuet was still around and with surprise, Yuet kills Suet. Thus both sides lose one member of their team.

Back at HQ, Hon Sun dies of his injuries but with his last breath told Kong to forgive the past and give the youngsters a chance at redemption and he was indeed over his head, just as Kong told him. Suet is remembered by her comrades and even her target (Cameo by Andy On). After condolences for Suet. The team decides to catch the operatives using all the training. A China agency attempts to deport them but they are saved by Kong who only recently discovers the operatives true intentions. The operatives want the microfilm because it contains the bank account numbers of the Duen brothers which contain millions of dollars. Their plan is then mobilized.

Ho gets to Yu Ching first luring her away from the operatives tricking her in believing he is a friend of Petros. Jun shoots Ching's car tire so Petros would pick her up. Ho then leads the operatives to an abandoned warehouse where Jun ambushes Yuet. Joe then enters the warehouse and is instantly rammed with a forklift driven by Jie. However Jie underestimated Joe and after a few struggles, Jie manages to impale Joe onto a large sign nail and electrocute him to death with a live wire. Jun enters an intense sniper battle against Yuet at a cemetery. Jun initially lost the fight and just as he was crawling away, Yuet tries to execute Jun but just as she was about to fire, Jun threw a glass vase at her direction and the bullet shattered the glass, impaling Yuet's eyes causing her to go blind and Jun grabs her rifle away from her. In a blind rage, Yuet draws her knife and charges at Jun. Jun eventually retaliates and guns Yuet down with her. Kong finally defeats Ko after an intense swordfight, and with Ko committing suicide by stabbing himself.

Petros is the only operative left. Lok posing as a taxi driver drives Ho and Yu Ching away to a mall where Yu Ching is to deliver the microfilm to Tiger. Lok tries to keep Petros off Ho's back but Lok is stabbed with a corkscrew whilst tussling with Petros in a supermarket and is seemingly killed. Using the performing lion dance troupe as a distraction while hijacking Lok's radio, Ho is pistol whipped by Petros and Petros meets back with Yu Ching. Petros decides to deliver the microfilm to Tiger himself. In the cinema, Tiger takes Petros hostage with a silenced pistol and taunts Petros with an empty box but Petros, having fallen in love with Yu Ching, was enraged with the way Tiger was talking about Yu Ching, disarms Tiger and kills him.

Petros then attempts to leave with Yu Ching, only to spot Ho who has regained conscious waiting to ambush him. Petros attempts to shoot Ho from a high deck, only to be shot in the back by Lok who survived the stabbing and was instead retaliated by Petros who shot Lok twice before fleeing. Lok tells Ho to go after Petros. Ho and Petros then engage in a gunfight where both men shoot each other in the same laundry room at the beginning until their guns are empty. Ho is heavily wounded in a narrow shootout with Petros but manages to shoot him dead and discovers the microfilm was hidden in Yu Ching's toy doll that she gave to Petros all along.

Lok, Ho, Kong, Jie and Jun who have all apparently healed arrive at the same bar and fire all their pistols at the same time at the screen.

== Cast ==
- Vanness Wu as Officer Wang Sun-Ho
- Shawn Yue as Officer Hung Kei-Lok
- Xia Yu as PRC Luo Zai-Jun
- Eva Huang as Officer Pak Yut-Suet
- Lawrence Chou as Officer James "Jie" Lam Chi Kit, INTERPOL
- Sammo Hung as Kong Long
- Michael Biehn as Petros Angelo
- Li Bingbing as Yu Ching
- Huh Joon-ho as Captain Ko Tung-Yuen
- Maggie Q as Yuet
- Simon Yam as Commander Hon Sun
- Isabella Leong as Kong's Daughter
- Mark Henderson as Joe Pearson
- Philip Ng as Lee Chun Pei
- Andy On as Suet's Undercover Target
- Kent Tong as "Tiger" Duen
- Ng Doi-yung as "Panther" Duen (credited as Hugo Ng)
- Abraham Boyd as Dominic Angelo
- Dan Cade as SWAT Team Instructor
- Bey Logan as Officer Kyle
- Gordon Liu as Ko
- Liu Kai-Chi
- Daniel J. Solis as SWAT Team
- Vincent Sze
- Yuen Wah as Stall Owner

== Filming Locations ==
Man Mo Temple - Fight sequence between Wang Sun-Ho and Petros Angelo filmed at one of Hong Kong's oldest temples.
