= Lawrence Chou =

Hong Kong-Canadian singer and actor

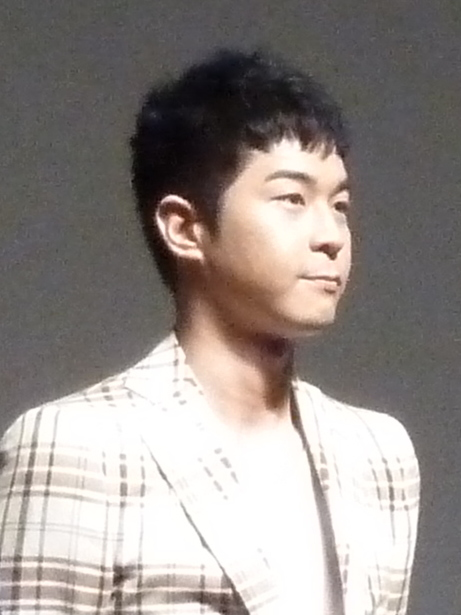
- Chou at the 2010 Hong Kong International Film Festival
- Born: 19 April 1979 (age 47); Hong Kong
- Occupations: Actor; singer
- Years active: 1998–present

Lawrence Chou (Chinese: 周俊偉) is a Hong Kong singer and actor.

== Profile ==
=== Music ===
Born in Hong Kong and raised in Vancouver, Chou developed a strong passion for music since he was a little kid. With his exceptional vocal talent, Chou won numerous singing contests in Vancouver and eventually earned a record deal with BMG in 1998. With two EPs and three LPs to his name, Chou quickly established himself as one of the brightest young singers in Taiwan, and was awarded the Best Male Newcomer award in 1998 by Channel V – the equivalent of MTV in Asia. Chou further revealed his musical talent as a producer and co-producer on many different albums for other artists or band since 1999, including highly acclaimed Mavis Fan's Jazz album, ASOS's Rock album, and finished release his own independent music group the album (Fuluju – Fukulukuju) in 2003, and won the Best Electronic Music Album awards in China 2004.

=== Films ===
Chou made his debut cameo in an omnibus film Heroes in Love in 2001 and quickly won the heart of the Hong Kong audience. Immediately afterwards, he collaborated with the director of Heroes in Love (radio celebrity Gi See Gu Bi) once more and played the lead character in Merry-Go-Round earning himself a nomination for Best Newcomer at the 2002 Hong Kong Film Awards.

In 2005 Chou played one of the 5 protagonists in the Hong Kong action film Dragon Squad

In 2007 Chou co starred with Byron Mann, Tzi Ma and Eric Tsang in the Canadian Triad mini-series Dragon Boys as the main antagonist Movie Star. This also is his most known appearance in a Canadian production.

In 2017 Chou once again played an antagonist but with a minor part in the Hong Kong crime biopic Chasing the Dragon, starring Donnie Yen and Andy Lau.

== Filmography ==
- Chasing the Dragon 3 (2020)
- Enter the Fat Dragon (2019)
- Chasing the Dragon (2017)
- Happiness (2016)
- IPCC Files 2015 (2015) (TV series)
- Karma (2015) (TV series)
- Sexpedia (2015) (TV series) episode 8
- The Borderline (2014) (TV series)
- The Challenge (2014) (Variety show)
- Twilight Online (2014)
- Aberdeen (2014)
- SDU: Sex Duties Unit (2013)
- Vulgaria (2011)
- Big Blue Lake (2011)
- Merry-Go-Round (2010)
- Ex (2010)
- Dream Home (2010)
- Anaconda Frightened (2008) – Chu Qi
- Scare 2 Die (2008)
- Forest of Death (2007) – Patrick Wong
- Happy Birthday (2007) – Danny
- Dragon Boys (2007) (TV series) – Movie Star
- Re-cycle (2006) – Lawrence
- Without Words (2006) – Kit
- Dragon Squad (2005) – Officer James Lam, INTERPOL
- AV (2005)
- Leave Me Alone (2004) – Police officer
- Itchy Heart (2004) – Chi-Man's cousin
- The Death Curse (2003) – Keith
- Truth or Dare: 6th Floor Rear Flat (2003) – Wing
- If You Care... (2002)
- The Eye (2002) – Dr. Wah
- Merry-Go-Round (2001) – Fung
- Heroes in Love (2001) – Lawrence

== Discography ==
- 曾推出唱片專輯:
- 1998
  - 你別傻了 (周俊偉、劉德華合唱) (Don't Be A Fool)
  - 我愛你 (I LOVe YOU)
  - 國語單曲專輯 (EP) – Marry Christmas I Love You
- 1999
  - 搶救愛情 (Saving Your Love)
  - 了不起 (The Bomb)
  - BMG 12週年全家福演唱會主題曲 – 123木頭人
  - 國語合唱曲 – 愛在捉摸不定時
- 2000
  - 別人都在傳 (People Says)
- 2003
  - 音樂大碟 – 福祿壽之『序』
  - fuluju – fukulukuju
- 曾參與製作/ 監製唱片專輯：
- 1999
  - 國語專輯大碟 – 了不起 (周俊偉)
- 2000
  - 國語專輯大碟 – 麵飽堡 (虛擬歌手)
- 2001
  - 國語專輯大碟 – 絕世名伶 (范曉萱)
  - 國語專輯大碟 – 變態少女 (ASOS)
- 2003
  - 音樂大碟 – 福祿壽之『序』(福祿壽)
  - 國語專輯大碟單曲 – Dear (蘇永康)
  - 國語單曲 – 椰子罐頭 (遊戲貓)
  - 國語單曲 – Jones Cup (Homies)
- 2004
  - 青春連續電視劇『天下無敵』原創主題曲、插曲、及配樂
- 2005
  - 國語專輯大碟 – 還有別的辦法嗎？(范曉萱)
- 2006
  - 國語專輯大碟單曲 – Funky Underground (容祖兒)
- 2007
  - 電影配樂 – 電影 Scare to die/嚇死你
- 2008
  - 廣告歌 – 中國移動通訊
- 曾演出電影及電視劇：
- November 2010
  - 網上電影 – 『4夜奇谭之指甲刀人魔 』原名:指甲钳人魔 周迅 周俊偉主演 彭浩翔 監製 曾国祥 尹志文 執導
- October 2010
  - 電影 -『東風破』官恩娜 泰廸羅賓 苗可秀 周俊偉 主演 鄭思傑麥婉欣 執導
- December 2010
  - 香港電台製作之寫實電視劇『火速救兵』之高溫任務 周俊偉 惠天賜 鄭啟泰 林偉 梁慧恩 關楚耀 高皓正 彭懷安 何浚尉 主演
- June 2010
  - 電影 -《前度》鍾欣桐 陳偉霆 詩雅 主演 麥曦茵 執導
- May 2010
  - 電影 – 《維多利亞壹號》何超儀 主演 彭浩翔 執導
- January 2009
  - 電視節目 – now香港台《一個地球 . 新西蘭篇》周俊偉 朱真真 主持
- October 2008
  - 電視節目 – RTHK香港電台 《不一樣的旅遊》周俊偉 譚俊彥 梁慧恩 主持
- June 2008
  - 香港電台寫實劇『512活在香港 – 在家』
- April 2008
  - 電影 –『六樓后座2』
- March 2008
  - 電影 -『Scare to die/嚇死你』
- March 2007
  - 電影 –『森冤』
- January 2007
  - 電影 –『生日快樂』
- September 2006
  - 國內電影 –『狂蟒驚魂』
- April 2006
  - 電影 – 『鬼域』
- February 2006
  - 電影 –『地老天荒』
- October - December 2005
  - 加拿大國家電視台-外語電視電影『龍在他鄉- Dragon Boys』
- May 2005
  - 電影 –『猛龍』
- March 2005
  - 電影 –『AV』
- February 2005
  - 電視 – 香港電視台製作之十封信『消失的人』
- August 2004
  - 電影 –『阿孖有難』
- May 2004
  - 香港電視台製作之以少林武術為主題的青春連續電視劇『天下無敵』担任男主角
- September 2003
  - 電影 –『古宅心慌慌』
- March 2004
  - 電影 -『七年很癢』
- June 2003
  - 電影 –『六樓后座』
- June 2003
  - 台灣電視偶像劇特輯 — 『沒完沒了的夏天』
- September 2002
  - 電影 – 『賤精先生(If You Care) 』
- May 2002
  - 電影 – 『見鬼 (The Eye) 』
- March 2002
  - 電影 – 『戀愛行星(Tiramisu) 』
- September 2001
  - 電影 – 『初戀嗱喳麵 (Merry-Go-Round) 』
  - 周俊偉憑著《初戀嗱喳麵》被提名角逐第二十一屆香港電影金像獎「最佳新演員」獎
- April 2001
  - 電影 – 戀愛起義《不得了》

== Awards ==
- 2004
  - 憑音樂大碟 – 福祿壽之『序』榮獲中國內地《第四屆華語音樂傳媒大獎》之「最佳電子音樂大獎」
- 2002 21st Annual Hong Kong Film Awards Nomination – Best New Artist
- 1999
  - 榮獲Channel【V】華語榜最佳男歌手新人獎
- 1998
  - 榮獲香港IFPI單曲銷量冠軍 (你別傻了)
  - 榮獲馬來西亞「動感三二一」金曲獎 (我愛你)
- 1996 Champion in Dragon Seed Connection Echoes Karaoke Contest
- 1995 Champion in Melody Shake Karaoke Contest
- 1994 Youth Team Champion in Vancouver Miho Second Karaoke Contest
- 1994 Youth Team Champion in Second Annual Vancouver Talent Night Karaoke Contest
- 1994 Typhoon award in Second Annual Vancouver Talent Night Karaoke Contest

== Timeline ==
- 1994
  - Participated in Vancouver Miho Second Karaoke Contest—Youth Team Champion.
  - Participated in Second Annual Vancouver Talent Night Karaoke Contest—Youth Team Champion.
  - Participated in Second Annual Vancouver Talent Night Karaoke Contest—Typhoon award.
- 1995
  - Participated in Melody Shake Karaoke Contest—Champion.
  - To 1997, participated in Canada Shadow Dance Troupe (加拿大影舞者舞團); publicly performing about 250 times each year.
- 1996
  - Participated in Dragon Seed Connection Echoes Karaoke Contest—Champion.
- 1997
  - Participated in BMG 10th Anniversary Concert.
  - Participated in Julia Peng's School Campus Tour Concert (彭佳慧校園巡迴演唱會) for 10 shows.
- 1998
  - Published own Mandarin single "Don't Be A Fool".
  - July, published personal first Mandarin album "I LOVe YOU".
  - July, duet with Andy Lau in single "Don't Be A Fool", won IFPI Singles Billboard Champion.
  - September, invited to become new type shopping store Galaxy's spokesperson.
  - December, published second single "MARRY CHRISTMAS I LOVE YOU".
- 1999
  - Honored with Channel [V]'s 華語榜中榜 Best New Male Singer Award.
  - January, published second big Mandarin album "Saving Your Love".
  - January, shot KOBAYASHI OPTICAL (小林眼鏡) CF, became product's spokesperson.
  - November, published third album "Great" and took charge as Producer.
- 2000
  - May, invited to shoot electronic dictionary "酷譯典" advertisement.
  - June, published own first new compilation album "People Says".
