= HKTVMall =

Hong Kong Television Network Limited 香港電視網絡有限公司
- Company type: Subsidiary
- Industry: e-Commerce
- Founded: 1 February 2015; 11 years ago
- Headquarters: HKTV Multimedia and Ecommerce Centre, 1 Chun Cheong Street, Tseung Kwan O Industrial Estate, Tseung Kwan O
- Area served: Hong Kong
- Key people: Ricky Wong
- Website: www.hktv.com.hk www.hktvmall.com

HKTVmall is a wholly owned subsidiary of HKTV founded in 2015 as an over-the-top shopping and entertainment ("shoppertainment") platform.

== History ==
After HKTV's ultimately failed bid for a Hong Kong TV license, HKTV announced on 16 December 2014 that it would begin trialing its online shopping platform known as HKTVmall, to be launched on 1 February 2015.
