= The Drive of Life =

- Official poster
- 歲月風雲
- Genre: Modern Drama (Grand Production)
- Written by: Au Koon-ying
- Starring: Damian Lau; Michael Miu; Liao Jingsheng; Charmaine Sheh; Jessica Hsuan; Raymond Lam; Sheren Tang; Joe Ma; Myolie Wu; Gigi Wong; Lawrence Ng; Feng Shaofeng; Ron Ng; Toby Leung
- Opening theme: Sui Yuet Fung Wan (歲月風雲) performed by Hacken Lee and Chou Chuan-huing
- Ending theme: Troika (Russian Folk Song)
- Countries of origin: Hong Kong; China
- Original languages: Cantonese; Mandarin
- No. of episodes: 60 (TVB); 58 (CCTV)

Production
- Producers: Tommy Leung; Poon Ka Tak
- Running time: 45 minutes per episode

Original release
- Network: TVB (Jade); CCTV (CCTV 1/CCTV 8)
- Release: 16 July – 5 October 2007

The Drive of Life (traditional Chinese: 歲月風雲; simplified Chinese: 岁月风云; pinyin: Suìyuè Fēngyún) is a 2007 grand production drama by TVB and CCTV as a joint production. It was specially filmed to celebrate the 10th Anniversary of the handover of Hong Kong back to China from Britain during the period of 1997-2007.

The theme of the series revolves around the automobile industry in China. Told in flashback from 1994, the ups and downs and transformations that Hong Kong has been experiencing before and after the transfer of sovereignty over Hong Kong is used as a narrative device. The series was filmed in Hong Kong, Beijing, Ningbo and Vancouver from early October 2006 until May 2007. The automobiles featured in the series are from Geely Automobile, as a fictional brand name "Hua-Zhe". This stars "TVB Best Actress" winners Charmaine Sheh, Jessica Hsuan, Myolie Wu and Sheren Tang who won their respective "Best Actress" awards in 2006/2014, 1999, 2011, and 2009/2010.

Astro On Demand, Astro's video on demand service, starts with the series premiere.

== Synopsis ==
Wah Man-hon, Wah Man-hung and Wah Man-shek were all born in Beijing. As a result of the massive political upheaval and the profound misunderstanding among them, the three brothers have fallen out and now live separately in Hong Kong, Beijing and Vancouver respectively.

Man-hon's business goes down the pan in the aftermath of the Asian Financial Crisis. The only saving grace is that members of the Wah family from around the world, including Man-hon's son Wah Chun-bong and Hung's son Wah Chun-man, can finally put their prejudice aside and become reconciled with one another. To realize the century-old dream of the family, they decide to work together to develop the local automobile industry.

== Cast ==
=== Main cast ===
Wah family

Cast	Role	Description
Damian Lau	Wah Man-hon 華文翰	Age 52 to 65; Wah Ching-yu and Wah Chun-bong's father. Hui Chaam-yan's husband. Wah Man-hung and Wah Man-sek's elder brother.
Gigi Wong	Hui Chaam-yan 許湛恩	Age 47 to 60; Wah Ching-yu and Wah Chun-bong's mother.Wah Man-hon's wife
Jessica Hsuan	Wah Ching-yu 華清瑜	Wah Man-hon and Hui Chaam-yan's daughter Ngai Wing-biu's girlfriend later wife Wah Chun-bong's elder sister
Raymond Lam	Wah Chun-bong 華振邦	Age 27 to 40; Wah Man-hon and Hui Chaam-yan's son Fong Bing-yi's ex-boyfriend. Wing Sau-fung's boyfriend later husband Wah Ching-yu's younger brother
Liao Jingsheng	Wah Man-hung 華文鴻	Age 48 to 60
Feng Shaofeng	Wah Chun-man 華振民	Age 24 to 37 Fong Bin-yi's husband
Michael Miu	Wah Man-sek 華文碩	Age 42 to 55
Sheren Tang	Wang Siu-fun 汪紹芬	Age 38 to 51
Toby Leung	Wah Ching-lam 華清琳	Age 18 to 31
Lau Kong	Wang Ching-kwok 汪政國	Age 65
Power Chan	Wang Siu-leung 汪紹良	Age 34 to 47

Wang Ching-kwok
Hui Chaam-yan	Wah Man-hon	Wah Man-hung	Wah Man-shek	Wang Siu-fun	Wang Siu-leung
Wah Ching-yue	Wah Chun-bong	Wah Chun-man	Wah Ching-lam

Ng family

Cast	Role	Description
Benz Hui	Ngai Ling-tai 危令泰	
Mary Hon	Lo Ho-yuet 盧皓月	
Joe Ma	Ngai Wing-biu 危永標	Age 27 to 40
Ron Ng	Ngai Gai-keung 危介強	Age 20 to 33
Lawrence Ng Wai-kwok	Ngai Tin-hang 危天行	Age 44 to 54

Ngai Tin-hang	Ngai Ling-tai		Lo Ho-yuet
	Ngai Gai-keung	Ngai Wing-biu

Wing family

Cast	Role	Description
Wong Chik-sam	Wing Sau-fung's father	
Maggie Chan	Wai Cheung-ping 衞長萍	Age 47 to 53
Charmaine Sheh	Wing Sau-fung 榮秀風	Age 26 to 39

Wing Sau-fung's father		Wai Cheung-ping
	Wing Sau-fung

Fong family

Cast	Role	Description
Lai Suen	Ching Tai-tie 錢帶娣	
Lee Kwok-lun	Fong Yiu-chong 方耀忠	
Myolie Wu	Fong Bing-yi 方秉怡	Age 24 to 37
Jeffrey Wong		

Ching Tai-tie
Fong Yiu-chong
Fong Bing-yi

=== Other cast ===
==== Hua-Zhe Automobiles ====
- Jason Chan as Chai Hoi
- Bruce Li as Po Gam
- Henry Lo as Jung Dung
- Felix Lok as Chan Jen Cheung
- Ellesmere Choi as Ng Zhi-ming
- Reyan Yan as So San
- Ng Wai-shan as Ka Ling
- Anita Kwan as Siu Man
- Koo Ming-wa as Lo Hon
- Anita Kwan as Siu Man
- Wong Wai-tak as Matthew
- Tsang Wai-wan as researcher
- Wong Ka-yi as secretary
- Gregory Rivers as R&D group leader
- Adam Ip as employee
- Martin Tong as employee
- Jason Lam as employee
- Steven Ho as employee
- Candy Cheung as employee
- Pauline Chow as employee
- Jim Tang as employee
- Wilson Tsui as employee

==== Kwok Wai Steel ====
- Kwong Chor-fai
- Kong Hon
- Joe Junior
- Simon Lo
- Kwok Tak-shun
- Lee Hoi-sang
- Leo Tsang
- Chu Wai-tak
- Tsui Wing
- Siu Chuen-yung as Ho Kin

==== Sirius Investment ====
- Rocky Cheng as Rocky
- Rachel Kan as Ngai Tin-hang's secretary

==== Bedding & Pillow Company ====
- So Yun-chi as Mrs Cheung
- Law Ho-kai as Mr Go

==== Canadian associates ====
- Ko Jun-man as Mr Kwan
- Lee Gong-lung as Mr Chan
- Billy Lam as detective
- Lee Cheung-dou as Yuen Yiu-wai
- Chan On-ying as Mrs Yuen
- Joseph Yeung as psychologist

==== Others ====
- Michael Wong as Wai Lun
- Zhao Ke as Lee Seen-sin
- Angela Tong as Chi Chi
- Leanne Li as Bo Wai
- Deno Cheung as Lam Leung
- Matthew Ko
- Vivien Yeo as Carman
- Annie Chung as car fan
- Yeung Ying-wai as Peter
- Henry Lee as bank executive
- Cheng Ka-sang as Tai Tung Tat garage worker
- Patrick Dunn as Lee Kai-fat
- Ha Ping as Wah family's great aunty (ep22)
- Yu Tze-ming as Wong Cheung
- Lau Tin-lung as reporter
- Meini Cheung as Kong Man
- Leung Kin Ping as Mr Ma (ep32)
- Chin Kar-lok as Chan Ka-lok (ep33-35)
- Jo Jo as Cho Hung (ep35)
- Tammy Ho
- Siu Cheuk-hiu as Mr Cheung
- Lee Tsi-kei as Muk Chuen
- Ng Man-sang as interpreter
- Winnie Shum
- Jacky Yeung
- Chan Yu-hei
- Ho Jun-hin as stock broker
- Kwok Fung as Sung Hok-li
- Lee Fung
- Law Kwan-chor
- Candy Cheung
- Peter Pang as jockey club staff
- Lee Kai-kit as doctor
- Wong Kei-sen as a signature specialist
- Helena Wong

== Theme song ==
The Sky is Blue (天這樣藍)
- Lyrics: Sandy Chang
- Composition and Arrangement: Joseph Koo
- Performance: Hacken Lee and Steve Chou

== Viewership ratings ==
	Week	Episode	Average Points	Peaking Points	References
1	July 16–20, 2007	1 — 5	31	33	
2	July 23–27, 2007	6 — 10	29	32	
3	July 30 - August 3, 2007	11 — 15	30	33	
4	August 6–10, 2007	16 — 20	30	33	
5	August 13–17, 2007	21 — 25	30	33	
6	August 20–24, 2007	26 — 30	31	34	
7	August 27–31, 2007	31 — 35	31	33	
8	September 3–7, 2007	36 — 40	33	36	
9	September 10–14, 2007	41 — 45	29	30	
10	September 17–21, 2007	46 — 50	29	30	
11	September 24–28, 2007	51 — 55	33	36	
12	October 1–5, 2007	56 — 60	33	39	

== Awards and nominations ==
40th TVB Anniversary Awards (2007)

- "Best Drama"
- "Best Actor in a Leading Role" (Damian Lau) Top 5
- "Best Actor in a Leading Role" (Michael Miu)
- "Best Actor in a Leading Role" (Raymond Lam) Top 5
- "Best Actor in a Supporting Role" (Ng Wai-kwok) Top 5
- "Best Actress in a Supporting Role" (Gigi Wong) Top 5
- "Best Actress in a Supporting Role" (Toby Leung)
- "My Favourite Male Character Role" (Damian Lau)
- "My Favourite Male Character Role" (Michael Miu)
- "My Favourite Male Character Role" (Ng Wai-kwok)
- "My Favourite Male Character Role" (Joe Ma)
