= The Wicked League =

- Written by: Alex Pao
- Directed by: Kwan Shu-ming
- Starring: David Chiang; Yuen Wah; Kwok Fung; Pai Piao; Peter Lai; Lee Fung; Alice Fung So-bor; May Tse; Cheng Shu-fung; Wong Ching
- Country of origin: Hong Kong
- Original language: Cantonese
- No. of episodes: 20

Production
- Producer: Choi Suk-yan
- Production location: Hong Kong
- Camera setup: Multi-camera
- Running time: 22 minutes
- Production company: Hong Kong Television Network

Original release
- Release: 22 June – 17 July 2015

The Wicked League (Chinese: 惡毒老人同盟) is a 2015 Hong Kong sitcom series produced by Hong Kong Television Network. The first episode premiered on 22 June 2015.

== Cast ==
- David Chiang
- Yuen Wah
- Kwok Fung
- Pai Piao
- Peter Lai
- Lee Fung
- Alice Fung So-bor
- May Tse
- Cheng Shu-fung
- Wong Ching
- Bonnie Wong
- Crystal Leung
- Rachel Lam

== Release ==
A 6-minute preview was released on HKTV's YouTube channel on 16 June 2015.
