= In the Chamber of Bliss =

- Official poster
- 蔡鍔與小鳳仙
- Genre: Period Drama
- Starring: Damian Lau; Kathy Chow; Kenneth Ma; Angela Tong; Toby Leung; Dominic Lam; Kristal Tin; Law Lok-lam
- Opening theme: "傷愛一生" by Kathy Chow
- Country of origin: Hong Kong
- Original language: Cantonese
- No. of episodes: 20

Production
- Producer: Leung Choi Yuen
- Running time: 45 minutes (approx.)

Original release
- Network: TVB
- Release: September 21 – October 16, 2009

In the Chamber of Bliss (Traditional Chinese: 蔡鍔與小鳳仙) is an TVB period drama series, starring Damian Lau, Kathy Chow, Kenneth Ma, Angela Tong and Toby Leung as the main leads.

== Cast ==
Cast	Role	Description
Damian Lau	Choi Ngok (General Chai) 蔡鍔	Military General; Bak Sze-Ting's husband.
Kathy Chow Hoi-Mei	Siu Fung-Sin (Lady Balsam) 小鳳仙	Courtesan
Kenneth Ma	Yue Yam-Kwok 余任國	Military Student
Angela Tong	Siu Lai-Mei 小麗媚	Siu Fung-Sin's good friend
Toby Leung	Mok Ching-Yee 莫菁兒	Mok Yik-Tin's daughter. Killed by Mok Yik-Tin in Ep.19
Dominic Lam	Mok Yik Tin 莫逆天	Mok Ching-Yee's father.
Kristal Tin	Bak Sze-Ting 白思婷	Choi Ngok's wife.
Law Lok Lam	Yuen Sai Hoi 袁世凱	

== Plot ==
Military Governor Choi Ngok (Damian Lau) has been attempting to overthrow the Yuen Sai Hoi government. To facilitate his plan to stage an uprising in Yunnan, he pretends to be fooling around with the highly sought-after courtesan Cheung Feng Wan (Chow Hoi Mei), nicknamed Siu Fung Sin, to avoid detection. Yuen Sai Hoi (Law Lok Lam), who is suspicious of Ngok, sends the Chief of Staff Mok Yik Tin (Lam Ka Wah) to spy on him. Later he even lures Ngok's wife Pak Sz Ting (Tin Yui Nei) to Beijing, hoping that this will force Ngok to pledge his loyalty to the government. To ensure the success of the revolutionary movement, Ngok carries on with his affair with Wan as a camouflage, without realizing that she has seriously fallen in love with him. Wan is ready to give up everything just to be with Ngok while he remains cold and distant towards her.

== Awards and nominations ==
TVB Anniversary Awards (2009)

- Best Drama
- Best Actor (Damian Lau)
- Best Supporting Actor (Dominic Lam)
- Best Supporting Actress (Angela Tong)

== Viewership ratings ==
	Week	Episodes	Average Points	Peaking Points	References
1	September 21–25, 2009	1 — 5	28	—	
2	September 28 - October 2, 2009	6 — 10	28	—	
3	October 5–9, 2009	11 — 15	29	—	
4	October 12–16, 2009	16 — 20	32	35	
