= Mizz Eva =

- 陳詩慧
- Born: Chen Sze-wai; 17 October 1981 (age 44); British Hong Kong
- Occupation: Rapper

Chan Sze-wai (traditional Chinese: 陳詩慧; simplified Chinese: 陈诗慧; born 17 October 1981), known professionally as Mizz Eva, is a Hong singer and composer. She was the first female rapper in Hong Kong. Her first album was "L for..(2004)".

Chan started writing pop songs in 2003. She became a TVB employee in 2005, and in 2008, Universal Music Group Hong Kong signed her. Chan later joined Hong Kong Television Network and wrote music for seven of its dramas by 2014 including The Election.

== Discography ==
- "L for.." (2004)
- "l'll be There" (2015)

== Filmography ==
- The Election (2014–2015)
- The Menu (2015)
- Night Shift (2015)
