= Super Snoops =

- Official poster
- 荃加福祿壽探案
- Genre: Modern Drama, Comedy
- Developed by: Hong Kong Television Broadcasts Limited
- Starring: Liza Wang; Wong Cho-lam; Louis Yuen; Johnson Lee; Toby Leung
- Opening theme: Super Stupid (超低能) by Liza Wang, Wong Cho-lam, Louis Yuen, Johnson Lee {sung solely by Wong Cho-Lam, who also did the female vocals from episodes 1-9 of the overseas version.
- Country of origin: Hong Kong
- Original language: Cantonese
- No. of episodes: 20

Production
- Producer: Kwan Wing Chung
- Production location: Hong Kong
- Camera setup: Multi-camera
- Running time: 44 minutes (approx.)
- Production company: TVB

Original release
- Network: TVB Jade
- Release: 3 October – 28 October 2011

Related
- River of Wine; Curse of the Royal Harem

Super Snoops (Traditional Chinese: (荃加福祿壽探案) is a 2011 TVB modern comedy drama series set in the 1960s. Starring Liza Wang, Wong Cho-lam, Louis Yuen, Johnson Lee and Toby Leung. It is loosely based on the concept of popular TVB variety sketch comedy show "Fun With Liza And The Gods" 荃加福禄寿 starring Liza Wang, Wong Cho-lam, Louis Yuen and Johnson Lee.

== Synopsis ==
Inspector SUN CHIU-TUNG (Liza Wang) leaves the police force because of an unsettled case. She then opens a private investigation agency and, due to all sorts of accidental mishaps, employs KUNG CHAK-LAM (Wong Cho Lam), KUNG TUK-LAM (Louis Yuen) and TSUI SHUI (Johnson Lee).

The three young men have all been treated badly by life. By taking them in, TUNG is given the ability of clairvoyance, that is, the power to see the future. CHAK-LAM, TUK-LAM and SHUI also have distinct supernatural power of their own. CHAK-LAM can go through a wall; TUK-LAM can turn into a kung fu master for a minute whenever he likes; and SHUI is able to make a person tell the truth. With their supernatural powers and superb impersonating skills, the foursome is gearing up to crack the most difficult cases.

== Cast ==
=== Main characters ===
- Sun Chiu-tung (辛潮彤) (portrayed by Liza Wang), a detective agency owner, with super power of knowing the future
- Hung Chak-nam (恭澤嵐) (portrayed by Wong Cho-lam), Hung Duk-nam's half-brother, with super power of walking through walls
- Hung Duk-nam (恭犢嵐) (portrayed by Louis Yuen), Hung Chak-nam's half-brother, with super power of fighting skills
- Chui Shui (崔湑) (portrayed by Johnson Lee) with super power of making people telling the truth, Chu Dak-yan's son and later Ngok Kau's boyfriend
- Ngok Kau (岳皎) (portrayed by Toby Leung) is Sun Chiu-tung's daughter, an amateur inventor who becomes Chui Shui's girlfriend

=== Recurring cast ===
- Dik Hon (狄瀚, portrayed by Wilson Tsui) is a Police Sergeant who admired Sun Chiu-tung.
- Santos (山度士, portrayed by Brian Burrell) is a Police Inspector who is the superior of Lui King-chau and Dik Hon.
- Ar Fat (阿發, portrayed by Chun Wong) is the debt owner of Kung Chak-nam and Lam King-suet.
- Wong Kuen-ping (王娟萍, portrayed by Lily Leung) is Kung Duk-nam's grandmother.
- Kung Sam-kai (恭森薊, portrayed by Leung Kin-ping) is Kung Duk-nam and Kung Chak-nam's deceased father.
- Yau Ping (游萍, portrayed by Cecilia Fong) is Kung Chak-nam's mother.
- Landlord (portrayed by Gill Mohindepaul Singh) is Sung Chiu-tung's landlord, who has the super power of healing others by taking in their illnesses into his body

=== Supporting cast ===
==== Episodes 1-3 - Lui King-chau's murder ====
- Lui King-chau (雷勁揪, portrayed by King Kong), is a policeman who was killed by his wife, Lee Shing Lui.
- Lee Shing-lui (李盛女, portrayed by Elvina Kong) is Lui King-chau's wife and killed Lui King-chau.
- Lee Tai-chai (李打豺, portrayed by Tsui Wing) is a triad leader and Lee Shing-lui's lover.

==== Episodes 4-6 - Sor Fu-lei's murder ====
- Chow Kui-yeuk (周莒若, portrayed by Ella Koon) is a maid who killed Wu Tung to revenge for So Fu-le's death. She is loved by Chui Shui.
- Wu Tung (鄔東, portrayed by Matthew Ko) is a photo shop owner and So Fu-le's lover. He was killed by Chow Kui-yeuk.
- So Fu-lei (梭芙梨, portrayed by Casper Chan) is a maid. She commits suicide after being abandoned by Wu Tung.

==== Episodes 7-10 - Missing of Lam King-fa ====
- Lam King-suet (藍瓊雪, portrayed by Kiki Sheung) is a disco singer who is the elder sister of Lam King-fa.
- Lam King-fa (藍瓊花, portrayed by Louis Yuen) is a disco singer, who is the younger sister of Lam King-suet. She looks like Kung Duk-nam. She was kidnapped in a ship accident, but was later released. She reappeared to meet with Lam King-suet in Episode 10.
- Chu Dat-yan (朱達仁, portrayed by Shek Sau) is an entertainment industry entrepreneur and used to be a policeman. He was kidnapped in a ship accident, but was later released.
- Sam (portrayed by Adam Ip) is one of the boat passengers who kidnapped Chu Dat-yan, Lam King-fa and other passengers. He was killed by the order of Chu Dat-yan in Episode 10.
- Lee chun-cheong (李準昌, portrayed by Lau Tin-long) is one of the boat passengers who kidnapped Chu Dat-yan, Lam King-fa and other passengers. He was killed by the order of Chu Dat-yan in Episode 10.
- Yuen Fun (元勛, portrayed by Li Hung-kit) is a ship captain, who kidnapped Chu Dat-yan, Lam King-fa and other passengers. But he was killed by Sam and Lee chun-cheong because of internal conflict.
- Man Fung (文峰, portrayed by Ho Kwan Shing) is Lam King-fa's boyfriend.

==== Episode 11-14 Studio murder ====
- Chu Dat-yan (朱達仁, portrayed by Shek Sau) is an entertainment industry entrepreneur. He is the boss of Chap Yau, Sze Ying, Sham Foon, and Tsui Shui's father. He is also the killer of the father of Chak-Nam and Duk-Nam (disclosed in Ep:18)
- Sham Foon (沈寬, portrayed by Ho Hing Fai) is a film star, and Santos's cousin-in-law, who died in the studio by Sze Kot before a film "倩女销魂" started production.
- Chap Yau (習柔, portrayed by Christine Kuo) is a new Taiwanese film star, who is later Kung Chak-nam's girlfriend.
- Sze Ying (施影, portrayed by Linda Chung) is a third-to-fourth-line film star who acts as substitute actress of Chap Yau. She is Sze Kot's elder sister, de facto girlfriend.
- Sze Kot (施葛, portrayed by Ng Lok-wang) is Sze Ying's younger brother, de facto boyfriend, who killed Sham Foon. He looks like a child since he suffers from hypopituitarism.

==== Episode 15-17 Businessman murder ====
- Ling Miu-shat, Sheila (凌緲薩, portrayed by Aimee Chan) is Ling Kam's daughter, who was tortured by Sit Cheuk, her fiance. She is later the girlfriend of Kung Duk-nam.
- Sit Cheuk (薛卓, portrayed by Raymond Cho) is Ling Miu-shat's fiance, who determined to seize Ling Kam's wealth with Ling Sun.
- Ling Kam (凌錦, portrayed by Yu Chi-ming) is a wealthy businessman, Ling Miu-shat's father. He was killed by Ling Sun, his younger brother.
- Ling Sun (凌晨, portrayed by Peter Lai) is Ling Kam's younger brother and Ling Miu-shat's uncle. He determined to seize Ling Kam's wealth with Sit Cheuk.

== Viewership ratings ==
| | Week | Episodes | Average Points | Peaking Points | References |
|---|---|---|---|---|---|
| 1 | October 3–6, 2011 | 1 — 4 | 28 | 33 | |
| 2 | October 10–14, 2011 | 5 — 9 | 27 | — | |
| 3 | October 17–21, 2011 | 10 — 14 | 29 | 33 | |
| 4 | October 24–28, 2011 | 15 — 20 | 28 | 30 | |

== Awards and nominations ==
=== 45th TVB Anniversary Awards 2011 ===
- Nominated: Best Drama
- Nominated: My Favourite Male Character (Johnson Lee)
- Nominated: My Favourite Male Character (Louis Yuen)
- Nominated: My Favourite Male Character (Wong Cho-lam)
- Nominated: My Favourite Female Character (Liza Wang)
- Nominated: Most Improved Male Artiste (King Kong)
