= Men with No Shadows =

- Official poster
- 不速之約
- Genre: Drama
- Starring: Bobby Au-yeung; Raymond Lam; Tavia Yeung; David Chiang; Gigi Wong; Power Chan; Sire Ma; Mandy Wong; Catherine Chau; Jason Pai; Alice Fung So-bor
- Opening theme: 試煉 by Raymond Lam
- Ending theme: 試煉 by Raymond Lam
- Country of origin: Hong Kong
- Original language: Cantonese
- No. of episodes: 20

Production
- Producer: Poon Ka Tak
- Production location: Hong Kong
- Camera setup: Multi camera
- Running time: 42 – 45 minutes
- Production company: TVB

Original release
- Network: TVB Jade
- Release: September 12 – October 7, 2011

Men With No Shadows (Traditional Chinese: 不速之約), is a Hong Kong television drama starring Bobby Au-yeung, Raymond Lam, and Tavia Yeung. Produced by Poon Ka Tak Men With No Shadows is a TVB production.

== Cast ==
=== Kong Family ===
Cast	Role	Description
Jason Pai	Kong Chi-tat 江志達	Kam Wah-hei and Sung Chor-kiu's husband Kong Tung-kin and Kong Wai-mui's father
Alice Fung So-bor	Kam Wah-hei 金華喜	Kong Chi-tat's first wife Kong Tung-kin and Kong Wai-mui's mother
Gigi Wong	Sung Chor-kiu 宋楚喬	A Chinese medician physician Kong Chi-tat's second wife Kong Tung-kin and Kong Wai-mui's stepmother
Bobby Au-Yeung	Kong Tung-kin, Omar 江東健	A doctor Kong Chi-tat and Kam Wah-hei's son Sung Chor-kiu's stepson Kong Wai-mui's brother Fong Siu-fong's husband Miraculously survived from car accident in Episode 1
Tavia Yeung	Fong Siu-fong 方小芳	A hospital nurse Suffered from multiple chemical sensitivity Tong King-tin's daughter Tong Wing-sun's ex-girlfriend, later half-sister Kong Tung-kin's wife Toi Fung's love interest
Sire Ma	Kong Wai-mui 江惠妹	A private clinic nurse Kong Chi-tat and Kam Wah-hei's daughter Sung Chor-kiu's stepdaughter Kong Tung-kin's sister Loved Toi Fung

=== Fong Family ===
Cast	Role	Description
Ko Chun Man	James	Fong Siu-fong's stepfather Han's husband
Tsang Wai Wan	Han 嫻	James' wife Tong King-tin's mistress Fong Siu-fong's mother
Tavia Yeung	Fong Siu-fong 方小芳	Tong King-tin and Han's daughter James' stepdaughter

=== Toi Family ===
Cast	Role	Description
Lo Chun Shun	Toi Chi Keung 邰志強	Yung Mei Yuk's husband Toi Fung and Toi Yan's father Had cancer and deceased
Chan On Ying	Yung Mei Yuk 翁美玉	Toi Chi Keung's wife Toi Fung and Toi Yan's mother Committed suicide and died after her husband died
Raymond Lam	Toi Fung, Typhoon 邰風	Toi Chi Keung and Yung Mei Yuk's son Toi Yan's brother Used hypnosis (by biting into an apple and whipping an apple) to pretend to be a devil Tried to revenge Kong Tung-kin and Tong King-tin; Tried to kill Tong King-tin; Loved Fong Siu-fong; Kong Wai-mui's love interest Surrendered to justice and jailed in Episode 20 (Main villain)
Mandy Wong	Toi Yan 邰欣	Toi Chi Keung and Yung Mei Yuk's daughter Toi Fung's sister Was in coma when she was young Toi Fung imagined she wakes up in Episode 6 Woke up in episode 20

=== Tong Family ===
Cast	Role	Description
John Chiang	Tong King-tin 唐經天	Hong Zhi Pharmaceutical CEO; Kei Mei-kei's husband Tong Wing-sun's father (Semi-villain)
Ching Hor Wai	Kei Mei-kei 紀美琪	Tong King-tin's wife Tong Wing-sun's mother
Power Chan	Tong Wing-sun, Vincent 唐永燊	Hong Zhi Pharmaceutical Marketing Manager; Tong King-tin and Kei Mei-kei's son Man Ka-ling's boyfriend, later husband Fong Siu-fong's ex-boyfriend, later half-brother (Semi-villain)
Catherine Chau	Man Ka-ling 文嘉玲	A pharmacist Tong Wing-sun's girlfriend, later wife Loved Kong Tung-kin
Tavia Yeung	Fong Siu-fong 方小芳	Tong King-tin's daughter Tong Wing-sun's ex-girlfriend, later half-sister

=== Sung Family ===
Cast	Role	Description
Bowie Wu	Sung Fuk-chuen 宋福全	Sung Chor-kiu's father Kong Chi-tat's father-in-law Sung Sau-wan's grandfather
Gigi Wong	Sung Chor-kiu 宋楚喬	Sung Fuk-chuen's daughter Sung Sau-wan's aunt
Natalie Wong	Sung Sau-wan 宋秀雲	Sung Fuk-chuen's granddaughter Kung Chi-tat and Sung Chor-kiu's niece

=== Hong Zhi Pharmaceutical ===
Cast	Role	Description
John Chiang	Tong King-tin 唐經天	CEO; Han's lover Tong Wing-sun's father and superior (Semi-villain)
Power Chan	Tong Wing-sun, Vincent 唐永燊	Marketing Manager; Tong King-tin's son and subordinate Toi Fung's superior (Semi-villain)
Bobby Au-yeung	Kong Tung-kin 江東健	A doctor Tong King-tin's subordinate Man Ka-ling's superior
Catherine Chau	Man Ka-ling 文嘉玲	A pharmacist Kong Tung-kin's subordinate
Raymond Lam	Toi Fung, Typhoon 邰風	Manager assistant Tong Wing-sun's subordinate
Deno Cheung	Ben	Tong King-tin's subordinate Help Cheng Ka-wai to collect Hong Zhi's secret information Dismissed and changed to work in Ka Wai Pharmaceutical in Episode 8 (Villain)

=== Other casts ===
Cast	Role	Description
Poon Fong-fong	Auntie Poon 潘姑娘	A clergy Fong Siu-fong's friend
Felix Lok	Cheng Ka-wai 井家衛	Boss of Ka Wai Pharmaceutical; Tong King-tin's competitor and enemy Ordered Ben and Tong Wing-sun to collect secret information from Hong Zhi (Villain)
Skye Chan	Iris	Cheng Ka-wai's assistant

== Awards and nominations ==
=== 45th TVB Anniversary Awards 2011 ===
- Won: Most Improved Actress (Sire Ma)
- Nominated: Best Drama
- Nominated: Best Actor (Bobby Au Yeung)
- Nominated: Best Actor (Raymond Lam)
- Nominated: Best Supporting Actor (Power Chan)
- Nominated: Most Improved Actress (Mandy Wong)

=== My Astro On Demand Favourites Awards 2011 ===
- Won: My Favourite Television Character (Raymond Lam)
- Nominated: My Favourite Drama Top 5
- Nominated: My Favourite Actor (Raymond Lam) Top 5
- Nominated: My Favourite Supporting Actress (Gigi Wong)
- Nominated: My Favourite Theme Song (Raymond Lam) Top 5
- Nominated: My Favourite Television Character (Bobby Au-yeung)

== Viewership ratings ==
	Week	Episodes	Average Points	Peaking Points	References
1	September 12–16, 2011	1 — 5	26	30	
2	September 19–23, 2011	6 — 10	26	30	
3	September 26–29, 2011	11 — 14	28	35	
4	October 3–6, 2011	15 — 18	29	35	
4	October 7, 2011	19 — 20	32	36	

- The highest rating per minute.
