= Without Words (film) =

2006 Hong Kong film by Albert Mak

- Directed by: Albert Mak
- Written by: Macy Yik; Fei Ying
- Produced by: Sam Leong; Yoneyama Shin
- Starring: Lawrence Chou; Ella Koon; Derek Tsang
- Cinematography: To Hung-Mo
- Edited by: Azrael Chung
- Distributed by: Art Port, Inc.
- Release date: 16 February 2006
- Running time: 96 minutes
- Country: Hong Kong
- Language: Cantonese

Without Words (Chinese: 地老天荒; Cantonese Yale: Dei lo tin fong) is a 2006 Hong Kong romantic drama film starring Lawrence Chou, Ella Koon and Derek Tsang. The film revolves around an orphaned mute girl named Snow Yip and a young musician named Kit.

== Cast ==
- Lawrence Chou as Kit
- Ella Koon as Suet
- Sheren Tang as Kang's mother
- Derek Tsang as Michael
- Yuri Yonesato as Eva

== Plot ==
One morning, As Snow puts on her slippers, she pulls out her left foot and sees an engagement ring on the toe that corresponds to her ring finger. Kit asks her to marry him. A week before their wedding day, Snow gets into an accident and dies, but a sympathetic angel-in-training named Michael, who wears a bright orange shirt, brings her back to life and gives her three days for the wedding. The day before she has to leave Kit, Kit falls asleep while watching TV and Snow whispers into his ear: I love you so much. I want to be with you forever, but I must leave tomorrow night. A couple hours later, Kit wakes up and tells her that he had the strangest dream where she spoke with a husky and sexy voice, but she said she had to go somewhere and promises her that he'll be there with her, no matter what.

The next day, Kit needs to go to the bank to switch some money for their wedding. On the way, Snow is hit in the head by a ball. Kit pretends to get angry at the kids playing soccer and they both join the kids, buying them Popsicles later. Kit looks at his watch and realizes that he didn't switch the money and he runs off to the bank, telling Snow to go home and wait for him. When Kit arrives home, they both get married as planned, but Michael is the minister. After Michael declares them husband and wife, they both kiss, as done in weddings, but Snow collapses during the kiss, and dies in Kit's arms with a tear rolling down Michael's cheek. Snow finally dies after the deal has been done: staying alive long enough to get married within the three-day time limit. In the next scene, Kit is standing on the dock where he and Snow would hang out and go fishing, scattering red powder into the water. It is later revealed that Snow has been cremated.
