= Toby Leung =

Hong Kong film and television actress

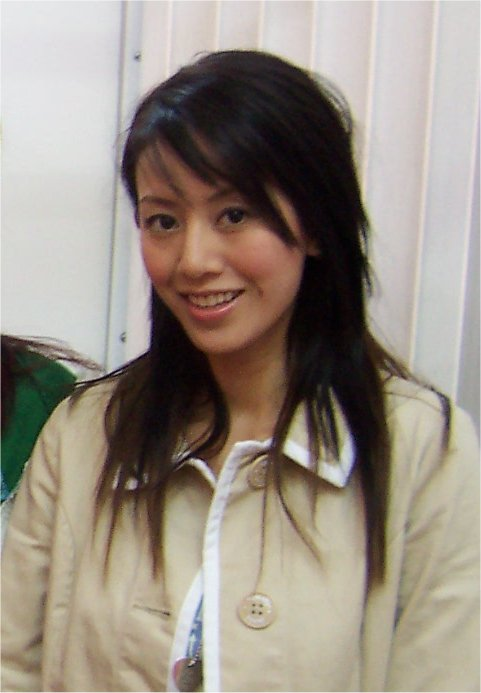
- Leung in 2003
- Born: British Hong Kong
- Occupations: Singer; actress
- Years active: 2004–present
- Spouses: Aaron Wong (m. 2011; div. 2014) Jonathan Sze (m. 2019)
- Children: 2
- Parent(s): Tommy Leung and Barbara Siu

Chinese name
- Traditional Chinese: 梁靖琪
- Simplified Chinese: 梁靖琪
Transcriptions
Standard Mandarin
- Hanyu Pinyin: liang2 jing4 qi2
Yue: Cantonese
- Jyutping: loeng4 zing6 kei4
- Musical career
- Genre: Cantopop
- Label: MusicNation

Toby Leung Ching-kei (Chinese: 梁靖琪) is Cantopop singer and actress from Hong Kong. She entered the music industry in 2004 when the MusicNationGroup discovered her talent. Together with Macy Chan, Elise Liu (廖雋嘉) and Bella Cheung (張曼伶), they formed the singing group Girl's only Dormitory (女生宿舍) which eventually disbanded. Her father, Tommy Leung (梁家樹), was also the deputy-chief director, and respectively producer, of dramas in TVB (and now with ViuTV), which allowed her to enter the acting career. She signed with TVB and became a contracted artist for 12 years until 2016 where she joined ViuTV.

== Filmography ==
=== Television ===
Year	Title	Role	Notes
2004	Golden Bug Detectives Academy	Toby	now.com.hk Online Drama
2004	Sunshine Heartbeat	Toby	Guest star
2005	The Zone	student	(ep. 2)
2006	Men in Pain	Ko Fan	Nominated – TVB Award for Best Actress
2007	The Drive of Life	Wah Ching-lam	Nominated – TVB Award for Best Supporting Actress; Nominated – TVB Award for Most Improved Actress
2007	Marriage of Inconvenience	Ng Yi Wu-jiu	Nominated – TVB Award for Most Improved Actress
2008	The Money-Maker Recipe	Mo Ying-shan	Nominated – TVB Award for Most Improved Actress
2009	The Threshold of a Persona	Chung Chi-yan	
2009	In the Chamber of Bliss	Mok Ching-yee	
2010	Growing Through Life	Hoi Mei-sze (Macy)	Nominated – TVB Award for Best Supporting Actress
2011	My Sister of Eternal Flower	Fa Lai-ping (Jenny)	
2011	Wax and Wane	Ho Ka-moon	Nominated – TVB Anniversary Award for My Favourite Female Character (Top 15)
2011	Super Snoops	Ngok Kau	
2013	Season of Love	Lam Chun-fan	Episodes 1–5: Chapter of Spring
2013	Triumph in the Skies II	Tung Oi-ping (Apple)	
2013	Bounty Lady	Lam Shuk-wah (Paula)	
2014	ICAC Investigators 2014	Chan Sze-man (Elaine)	(ep. 3)
2014	The Ultimate Addiction	Ho Seung-fei	
2014	Line Walker	Chiu Mei-hin	
2015	Wudang Rules	Yeung Ching-wu	
2015	Angel In-the-Making	Noddy Siao	
2018	Shadow of Justice	Lin Yin	
2018	Infernal Affairs	Su Qing	
2022	Modern Dynasty	Ma Chiu-Tse (Chelsea)	
2024	The Heir to the Throne	Yau Chi-lam (Nana)	

=== Films ===
Year	Title	Role	Notes
2005	Drink-Drank-Drunk	Toby	
2006	Confession of Pain	policewoman	
2007	The Haunted School	Ah Sze	
2008	True Women for Sale	Elaine	
2009	Love Connected	Vivian	
2010	72 Tenants of Prosperity	"Ting Tai Phone" mobile store employee	
2019	Lion Rock 獅子山上	Cathy	

== Discography ==
- Life is Beautiful (2004)
- Bear in Mind (2005)

== Personal life ==
Leung has Canadian nationality in addition to Hong Kong citizenship. She went to King George V School in Hong Kong for secondary education. She married Aaron Wong on 24 November 2011 and officially divorced in 2014. In 2019, Leung married to Johnathan Sze and had a baby in December named Roman Sze. In late 2021, she announced her second pregnancy on social media.
