= Curse of the Royal Harem =

2011 Hong Kong period drama

- Official poster
- Also known as: The Queen of All
- 萬凰之王
- Genre: Historical fiction Drama
- Written by: Lee Yee-wah; Choi Shuk-yin
- Starring: Jessica Hsuan; Myolie Wu; Sunny Chan; Gigi Wong; Nancy Wu; Joel Chan
- Theme music composer: Tang Chi-wai (opening); Yip Kai-chung (ending)
- Opening theme: Kok On Tin Ming (各安天命) by Susanna Kwan
- Ending theme: Tin Cho Tei Chit (天造地設) by Myolie Wu
- Country of origin: Hong Kong
- Original language: Cantonese
- No. of episodes: Hong Kong:29 (27 during the initial release with a 2-hour premiere and two 2-hour finales.); Overseas:31

Production
- Executive producer: Chong Wai-kin
- Production location: Hong Kong
- Camera setup: Multi camera
- Production company: TVB

Original release
- Network: Jade; HD Jade
- Release: 31 October – 4 December 2011

Related
- Super Snoops; Bottled Passion

Curse of the Royal Harem
- Traditional Chinese: 萬凰之王
- Simplified Chinese: 万凰之王
- Literal meaning: "The King Among Ten Thousand Phoenixes"
Transcriptions
Standard Mandarin
- Hanyu Pinyin: Wàn Huáng Zhī Wáng
Yue: Cantonese
- Jyutping: Maan6 Wong4 Zi1 Wong4

Curse of the Royal Harem (Traditional Chinese: 萬凰之王; literally "The King Among Ten Thousand Phoenixes") is a 2011 Hong Kong period drama produced by TVB under executive producer Chong Wai-kin. The 45-minute episodes aired from 31 October to 4 December 2011, in a total of 27 episodes in Hong Kong and 31 episodes for the overseas audience. Its stars Jessica Hsuan, Myolie Wu, Sunny Chan, Gigi Wong, Nancy Wu and Joel Chan. It is one of three grand TVB productions used to celebrate the channel's 44th anniversary, the other two being Super Snoops and Forensic Heroes III.

The drama is Hong Kong's fourth highest-rating serial drama of 2011.

== Summary ==
Set in the mid-1800s Qing Dynasty, Curse of the Royal Harem is loosely based on the reign of the Daoguang Emperor of China and tells of the drama and romantic intrigue in the court's Manchurian royal harem.

Yee-lan, the Consort Tsuen (Jessica Hsuan) was the new wife of Emperor Do-kwong (Sunny Chan)'s elder brother. However, Do-kwong's brother was missing after a battle and his body was never found. Empress Dowager Kung-chee (Gigi Wong) was devastated that she lost her beloved son and saw Yee-lan, as an ominous woman and wanted her dead. Because Do-kwong was already in love with Yee-lan, since he was young, he chose to save her by making Yee-lan, as his new concubine, which angered his wife, Empress Hao-sun (Myolie Wu). Partnering up with Empress Dowager, the two vowed to eradicate Yee-lan, using many different schemes to harm her. As Yee-lan, wanted to protect herself, she did not hesitate to battle the Empress to the end. During their battle, Yee-lan, accidentally discovered a major plot happening in the royal harem. Who is behind this big plot? Who will be the winner in this intense battle in the royal harem?

== Cast and characters ==
Character names are in Cantonese romanisation.

=== Main cast ===
| Actor | Character | Occupation |
|---|---|---|
| Jessica Hsuan | Niohuru Yee-lan | Emperor Daoguang's favourite consort and childhood crush. She was once married to Daoguang's Emperor's older brother Mian-yi; however, he went missing after he went to control a rebellion in Northwest China a few months after their marriage. Yee-lan is forced to become a human sacrifice for Min-yi's funeral ceremony by the orders of Empress Dowager Gongci, who sees Yee-lan as unfortunate and cursed. Do-kwong saves Yee-lan from her death and announces that he will take her hand in marriage. Although Yee-lan agrees to become his consort, she still holds the belief that Mian-yi is alive and escapes palace grounds to search for him. Yee-lan eventually falls in love with Emperor Daoguang, who honours her as an individual and his wife. Yee-lan goes through many palace schemes and hardships. Eventually, she leads a duplicitous lifestyle. She plotsand kills Choi-lam and eventually causes an unmendable rift with the Emperor. Hero turned Villain |
| Myolie Wu | Tunggiya Yuen-yuen | Emperor Daoguang's first empress consort and Yee-lan's main rival. Her coronation as Empress is disrupted by Do-kwong when he goes to save Yee-lan from burial. Jealous of Do-kwong's favouritism to Yee-lan, and a fear of losing her title as Empress, Yuen-yuen attempts to strip Yee-lan from power by dispatching a spy to Yee-lan's palace chamber. Yuen-yuen becomes desperate to conceive a son and is later deposed of her title as Empress after Emperor Daoguang discovers her illicit affair with Mianxin. Villain |
| Sunny Chan | Do-kwong Emperor | The benevolent Qing Dynasty Emperor who naturally became the successor of his father after the death of his older brother, Mianyi. He had a crush on Yee-lan since youth, but because Yee-lan and Mianyi were in love, he decided to forgo his pursuits. Daoguang interrupts Yuen-yuen's coronation as Empress to save Yee-lan from her burial and later takes her in as his consort, much to the dismay of Yuen-yuen and Empress Dowager Gongci. He is extremely close to his brothers and muses that if Mian- yi hadn't died, he would have been crowned instead. |
| Joel Chan | Min-yan | Do-kwong's younger half-brother. Min-yan extremely respects his older brother and purposefully presents himself in a much harsher and militaristic image to highlight Do-kwong's more sincere and benevolent side. Min-yan was Yuen-yuen's lover before she married Do-kwong. Though he still harbours feelings for her, Min-yan is disgusted by Yuen-yuen's calculating and cunning schemes for power. After suffering a miscarriage, Yuen-yuen seduces Min-yan and he sires a son with her. Swayed by Kung-chee and Yuen-yuen, Min-yan develops a growing dissent towards Do-kwong's rule and ultimately decides to overthrow him. |
| Gigi Wong | Empress Dowager Kung-chee | Do-kwong's stepmother and Min-yan's mother. Although Do-kwong is not her biological son, he is the most filial. Kung-chee believes Yee-lan is creating tension between her and Do-kwong, and finds her power in court to be weakening. She later convinces Min-yan to start a coup to overthrow Do-kwong. Main Villain |
| Nancy Wu | Choi-lam | The maiden Yuen-yuen sends to spy on Yee-lan. Choi-lam later betrays Yuen-yuen to serve Yee-lan, but is unhappy with her ambiguous relationship with her two masters. She later wins Do-kwong's favour and becomes Consort Ching (靜妃). Villain |

=== Minor characters ===
| Actor | Character | Occupation |
|---|---|---|
| Kwok Fung | Mukcheung-or | Lok-yan's father and Consort Dowager Shun's past lover. |
| Sire Ma | Lok-yan | Yuen-yuen's younger cousin and Min-yan's wife. Her marriage to Min-yan is arranged by Yuen-yuen. |
| Sarah Song | Empress Xiaoshurui | Emperor Do-kwong's deceased mother. |
| Peter Pang | Prince Muk | Do-kwong's deceased brother and Yee-lan's ex-husband. |
| Elena Kong | Consort Dowager Shun | Witness to Kung-chee's murder of Do-kwong's mother. |
| Cheung Kwok-keung | Wai Fuk-on | Kung-chee's personal eunuch and trusted follower. |
| Gordon Liu | Tunggiya Shumung-or | Yuen-yuen's father |
| Rebecca Chan | Tunggiya Sin-yau | Yuen-yuen's mother 'villain |
| Ching Hor-wai | Chui Mor-mor | Yee-lan's servant and Choi-kiu's mother. |
| Ben Wong | Fucha Ngok-tai | Yee-ling's pupil and Yee-lan's best friend. He later has a crush on Choi-kiu. |
| Kong Hon | Niohuru Yee-ling | Yee-lan's father. |
| Charmaine Li | Concubine Yeung | One of Yee-lan's good friends. She is the first of Do-kwong's concubines to get pregnant, but had a miscarriage few months later. |
| Macy Chan | Choi-kiu | Chui Mor-mor's daughter and Yee-lan's maid. |
| Oscar Chan | Little Eunuch Choi | Do-kwong's assistant eunuch. He has a crush on Choi-lam. |
| Vivien Yeo | Consort Wan | |
| Jess Shum | Consort Shing | |
| Russell Cheung | Little Eunuch Hong Yee-lan's assistant eunuch | |
| Lee Yee-man | Choi-yin | Yuen-yuen's maid |
| Sherry Chen | Worthy Lady Lam | |
| Shermon Tang | Empress Xiaomucheng | |
| Deborah Poon | Worthy Lady Tung | |
| Jason Cheng | Little Eunuch Kwai | Yuen-yuen's assistant eunuch. |
| Tina Shek | Choi-yuet (彩月) | |

== Viewership ratings ==
| Week | Episode(s) | Average points | Peaking points | Viewers in millions (peak) | References |
|---|---|---|---|---|---|
| 1 | 1 — 6 | 29 | 34 | 1.85 (2.17) | |
| 2 | 7 — 11 | 29 | — | 1.85 (—) | |
| 3 | 12 — 16 | 29 | — | 1.85 (—) | |
| 4 | 17 — 21 | 29 | 31 | 1.85 (1.98) | |
| 5 | 22 — 27 | 31 | 33 | 1.98 (2.10) | |
| 6 | 28 — 29 | 39 | 43 | 2.49 (2.74) | |

== Awards and nominations ==
=== My AOD Favourite Awards 2011 ===
- Won: My Favourite Actress in a Leading Role (Myolie Wu)
- Won: My Favourite Top 15 Drama Characters (Myolie Wu)
- Nominated: My Favourite Drama Series
- Nominated: My Favourite Drama Theme Song (Kok On Tin Ming (各安天命) by Susanna Kwan)

=== 45th TVB Anniversary Awards 2011 ===
- Won: Best Actress in a Leading Role (Myolie Wu)
- Won: Best Improved Female Artiste (Sire Ma)
- Won: Best Supporting Actor (Ben Wong)
- Nominated: Best Drama
- Nominated: Best Actor (Sunny Chan)
- Nominated: Best Actress (Jessica Hsuan)
- Nominated: Best Supporting Actress (Gigi Wong)

== International Broadcast ==
- Canada - Fairchild TV
- Malaysia - 8TV (Malaysia)
- Vietnam - Vinh Long Television Station Channel (THVL)
