= Sire Ma =

Chinese actress (born 1987)

- Born: 31 July 1987 (age 39); Chongqing, China
- Occupation: Actress
- Years active: 2007–present
- Awards: TVB Anniversary Awards – Most Improved Female Artiste; 2011 Relic of an Emissary; River of Wine; Men with No Shadows; Forensic Heroes III; Curse of the Royal Harem

Chinese name
- Traditional Chinese: 馬賽
- Simplified Chinese: 马赛
Transcriptions
Standard Mandarin
- Hanyu Pinyin: Mǎ Sài
Yue: Cantonese
- Jyutping: maa^{5} coi^{3}

Birth name
- Traditional Chinese: 司馬賽兒
- Simplified Chinese: 司马赛儿
Transcriptions
Standard Mandarin
- Hanyu Pinyin: Sīmǎ Sài-er
Yue: Cantonese
- Jyutping: si^{1} maa^{5} coi^{3} ji^{4}

Sire Ma (simplified Chinese: 马赛; traditional Chinese: 馬賽; pinyin: Mǎ Sài; born 31 July 1987) or Ma Choi is a Chinese actress and beauty pageant titleholder. Her birth name is Sima Saier (司马赛儿). She was the 2nd runner up at the Miss Hong Kong Pageant 2008, simultaneously winning the Miss Photogenic Award. She later went on to participate in the Miss International 2008, but was unplaced. She graduated from Hong Kong Baptist University. She left TVB around 2015 but remains active in mainland China in small roles on television and film.

Ma announced that she was married in early 2019 and gave birth to a girl in June 2019 named Camellia.

== Controversy and response ==
After a private video of Ma wearing lingerie was leaked online in 2014, she publicly addressed the matter in a press conference. Ma admitted to filming the content, claiming that her partner betrayed her.

=== TVB's reaction ===
Following the incident, TVB, with whom Ma is contracted, paused all her work engagements indefinitely. The decision was made in a meeting with TVB management. Ma accepted full responsibility for her actions and supported TVB's decision.

== Filmography ==
=== Film ===
Year	Title	Role	Notes
2007	The Movie Tycoon	Student	
2007	Exodus	Ann's friend	
2008	The Legend Is Born – Ip Man	Cheung Wing-wah	
2008	The Jade and the Pearl	Princess Sau	
2012	I Love Hong Kong 2012	News reporter	
2012	The Bounty	Bride	
2016	Three	Journalist	
2018	The Monkey King 3		
2018	Tycoon		
2022	Septet: The Story of Hong Kong		

=== Television dramas ===
Year	Title	Role	Notes
2010	OL Supreme	Cheung Mei-kwan	Sitcom regular
2011	Relic of an Emissary	Fu Siu-kiu	TVB Anniversary Award for Most Improved Female Artist
2011	River of Wine	Tsang Yuk-fong	TVB Anniversary Award for Most Improved Female Artist; Nominated — TVB Anniversary Award for Best Supporting Actress (Top 15); Nominated — My AOD Favourites Award for My Favourite Promising Actress
2011	Men with No Shadows	Nancy Kong Wai-mui	TVB Anniversary Award for Most Improved Female Artist
2011	Forensic Heroes III	Christy	Cameo appearance (Episodes 13–14)
2011	Curse of the Royal Harem	Lok-yan, the Princess Sui	TVB Anniversary Award for Most Improved Female Artist
2012	Daddy Good Deeds	Mary	Cameo appearance
2012	House of Harmony and Vengeance	Kuk Yuen-yuen	
2012	Silver Spoon, Sterling Shackles	Chung Ho-yee	
2013	Bullet Brain	Inspector Eva Kim	
2013	Will Power	Nana Lo Siu-lou	
2014	ICAC Investigators 2014	BoBo Law Po-man	Episode 4: Goal Tricks
2015	With or Without You	Kam Cho	
2016	No Reserve	Kam Wan-ling	

== Sources ==
- Miss Hong Kong Pageant 2008 Official Website
- Sire Ma - contestant bio
- Gallery - contestant images

Preceded by Loretta Chow 周美欣	Miss Hong Kong Pageant 2nd Runner-Up; 2008	Succeeded by Mizuni Hung 熊穎詩
Preceded by Grace Wong 王君馨	Miss Hong Kong Pageant Miss Photogenic Award; 2008	Succeeded by Candy Yuen 袁嘉敏

Awards and achievements
TVB Anniversary Awards
Preceded by Natalie Tong for A Watchdog's Tale; A Fistful of Stances; The Comeback Clan	Most Improved Actress; 2011 for Relic of an Emissary; River of Wine; Men with No Shadows; Forensic Heroes III; Curse of the Royal Harem	Succeeded by Mandy Wong for L'Escargot; The Hippocratic Crush; Sergeant Tabloid; Tiger Cubs; Divas in Distress
