= River of Wine =

Hong Kong television series

- Promo poster
- 九江十二坊
- Genre: Period drama
- Written by: Yuen Siu-na
- Starring: Bowie Lam; Linda Chung; Sunny Chan; Elena Kong; Nancy Sit; Ngo Ka-nin; Cilla Kung; Lau Kong; Evergreen Mak; Sire Ma; Alex Lam
- Theme music composer: Victor Chen
- Opening theme: Kam Chiu Yau Chau (今朝有酒) by Tai Chi
- Country of origin: Hong Kong
- Original language: Cantonese
- No. of episodes: 25

Production
- Executive producer: Wong Wai-sing
- Production locations: Hong Kong; Nanhai, Foshan, China
- Camera setup: Multi camera
- Production company: Television Broadcasts Limited

Original release
- Network: TVB Jade
- Release: 29 August – 30 September 2011

River of Wine
- intertitle
- Traditional Chinese: 九江十二坊
- Simplified Chinese: 九江十二坊
- Literal meaning: "The Twelve Mills of Jiujiang"
Transcriptions
Standard Mandarin
- Hanyu Pinyin: Jiǔjiāng Shí Èr Fāng
Yue: Cantonese
- Jyutping: Gau12 Gong2 Sap6 Ji6 Fong1

River of Wine is a 2011 Hong Kong period drama television series produced by Television Broadcasts Limited (TVB) under executive producer Wong Wai-sing. It stars Bowie Lam, Linda Chung and Sunny Chan as the main leads, with Elena Kong, Nancy Sit, Ngo Ka-nin and Cilla Kung as the major supporting cast. A costume fitting ceremony was held on 16 December 2010 at 12:30 PM. A blessing ceremony was held on 11 January 2011 2:00 PM where filming began. Production was wrapped on 2 April 2011. The premiere episode aired on 29 August 2011.

== Plot ==
The story takes place in the Qing Dynasty, revolving around the Sung and Leung family. Madam Leung (Nancy Sit) is the owner of a small business with eldest son Leung Ching-yiu (Bowie Lam), second son Leung Ching-hong (Sunny Chan), eldest daughter Leung Sau-man (Casper Chan) and youngest daughter Leung Sau-yin (Cilla Lok). Yiu originally was a worker at the Jiujiang brewery but due to a natural disaster, rewrote the lives of the Leung and Sung family.

Sung family’s daughter, Sung Chi-ching (Linda Chung), the third mistress Ting Kar-pik (Elena Kong) and eldest son Sung Chi-tsun (Ngo Ka-nin) were separated. The Sung family decided to adopt Yiu as their son and looked after the business. Hong thought Yiu became the Sung family's son for the sake of wealth.

Just when business for the Jiujiang wine brewery were going well, Sung family's long lost son returns and wants to claim back ownership of the business. This results in a major feud between the Leung and the Sungs.

Finally, when Yiu tied the marriage between Ching and Hong, he was ready to return ownership back to the Sungs. Sadly, Tsun's best friend Tsang Yuk-fong (Sire Ma)'s father Magistrate Tsang (Lau Kong) causes downfall to the family. The Sung family business is stolen, luckily Hong helps the family rebuild their business. The Sung and Leungs calm their feud.

== Cast and characters ==
=== Main characters ===
- Bowie Lam as Sung Ching-yiu (宋正堯) — born Leung Ching-yiu (梁正堯), Ching-yiu is the chairman of the Jiujiang Wine Guild and the current boss of Tsui Lung Winery, one of the twelve wine production businesses in Jiujiang. Twenty years ago, Ching-yiu left his family to become the adopted heir of wine master Sung Ting-tin, who lost his only son Chi-tsun in a shipwreck. The Leung's thought he abandoned them for money, but Ching-yiu only left to save his family from poverty. Intelligent and patient, Ching-yiu manages to make Tsui Lung Winery into one of the most prosperous and famous wineries of southern China. He eventually went away with Ting Kar Pik to a new place to start a new life by selling wines.
- Linda Chung as Sung Chi-ching (宋子澄) — the Sung family's daughter who is born with leg length discrepancy. Because of this, she is unable to find marriage to a proper family and often hides in her home doing paintings and sewing wedding gowns. She falls in love with Ching-hong and eventually becomes his wife. When she is pregnant, her husband, Leung Ching-Hong made a miscarriage herbal soup for her to drink, but she denies his request and throws away the soup and begs for him to keep the baby for their little family's sake. Eventually she gave birth safely to their baby.
- Sunny Chan as Leung Ching-hong (梁正匡) — Madam Leung's second son. He has a passion for wine making and hopes to own a wine shop in the future. He eventually marries Sung Chi-Ching and had a baby with her. When he knew his wife is sick with the baby and nearly dies, he made a miscarriage soup for her to drink and begs her to let the baby go. When his wife begs him to keep the baby for their little family's sake, he is touched and knelt down crying by her bedside with Madam Leung.

=== Recurring characters ===
- Elena Kong as Ting Ka-pik (丁家碧) — Ching-yiu's stepmother and soulmate, Chi-tsun and Chi-ching's stepmother and Sung's third wife. Her marriage to Sung was a business proposal, conducted by her father and brother, who wanted Sung to invest on their plantation business. She eventually went away with Sung Ching Yiu to a new place to start a new life by selling wines.
- Nancy Sit as Kwan Wai-lan (關惠蘭) — better known as Madam Leung (梁大媽), she is Ching-yiu's biological mother. She owns a small family restaurant with her second son Ching-hong.
- Ngo Ka-nin as Sung Chi-tsun (宋子駿) — the long-lost son of Sung and Chi-ching's older brother. He is saved from a shipwreck by a group of bandits who forced him to make a living as a street performer for the next twenty years. Bitter at these unfortunate events, Chi-tsun becomes extremely ambitious and cunning after returning to the Sung family. He forces Ching-yiu to step down prematurely and blindly follows the corrupted Magistrate Tsang of Jiujiang, believing that he is the only one who can take Tsui Lung Winery up to another level.
- Cilla Kung as Leung Sau-yin (梁秀妍) — Madam Leung's youngest daughter and later Chu Ah-ngau's wife.
- Alex Lam as Chu Ah-ngau (朱阿牛) — a family friend of the Leung's and later Leung Sau-yin's husband.
- Lau Kong as Magistrate Tsang Kin-leung (曾健樑) — the corrupted magistrate of Jiujiang, and Tsang Yuk-fong's father. He used Sung Chi-tsun to deprive of Sung's wealth. He was killed by bamboo in Episode 25.
- Cheung Kwok-keung as Sung Ting-tin (宋鼎天) - Deceased, Sung Mei-kam's younger brother and Ting Ka-pik's husband.
- Evergreen Mak as Prefect Chow Sai-fan (周世勳) — Magistrate Tsang's superordinate and the head prefect of the county. He is the key member of Chinese Revolutionary Party that engaged in political movement against Qing Dynasty.
- Sire Ma as Tsang Yuk-fong (曾郁芳) — the daughter of Magistrate Tsang. She is Chi-tsun's best friend and eventual love interest.
- Suet Nei as Sung Tsz Kam (宋芷琴) — Sung Ting-tin's older divorced sister. Along with Ka-pik, she is in charge of the Sung family's household obligations.
- Chun Wong as Ting Sheung-wing (丁尚榮) — Ka-cheong and Ka-pik's father. He died in Episode 16.
- Dickson Lee as Ting Ka-cheong (丁家昌) — Sheung-wing's son and Ka-pik's older brother. He became mad in Episode 19 after his father died.
- Yu Tz-ming as Leung Chau (梁秋) — grandfather of the Leung's. He died in Episode 20.
- Oscar Chan as Ho Lok-to (何樂滔) — Ching-yiu's loyal personal assistant.
- Kwok Fung as Sung To (宋濤) — Sung Mei-kam and Sung Ting-tin's cousin. He plotted against Sung Ching-yiu. He used Sung Chi-tsun to determine depriving of Sung's wealth.
- Chan Wing-chun as Chu Kwok-hung (朱國雄) — Sung Mei-kam and Sung Ting-tin's cousin. He pointed against Sung Ching-yiu. He used Sung Chi-tsun to determine depriving of Sung's wealth.
- Au Sui-wai as Cheung Chau-fat (張就發) — Ching-yiu's loyal servant.

== Awards and nominations ==
=== 45th TVB Anniversary Awards 2011 ===
- Nominated: Best Drama
- Nominated: Best Actress (Nancy Sit)
- Nominated: Best Actress (Elena Kong)
- Nominated: Best Supporting Actor (Ngo Ka-nin)
- Nominated: Best Supporting Actress (Sire Ma)
- Nominated: Most Improved Male Artiste (Jazz Lam)
- Nominated: Most Improved Female Artiste (Sire Ma)
- Nominated: Most Improved Female Artiste (Cilia Kung)

== Viewership ratings ==
The following is a table that includes a list of the total ratings points based on television viewership. "Viewers in millions" refers to the number of people, derived from TVB Jade ratings (including TVB HD Jade), in Hong Kong who watched the episode live. The peak number of viewers are in brackets.

#	Week	Episode(s)	Avg. points (peak)	Viewers in millions (peak)	Ref.
1	29 August — 2 September 2011	1 — 5	25 (29)	1.59 ( — )	
2	5 — 8 September 2011	6 — 9	27 (30)	1.72 ( — )	
3	12 — 16 September 2011	10 — 14	27 ( 30 )	1.72 ( )	
4	19 — 23 September 2011	15 — 19	26 ( 30 )	1.66 ( — )	
5	26 — 29 September 2011	20 — 23	29 ( 33 )	1.84 ( 2.11 )	
5	30 September 2011	24 — 25 (finale)	30 ( 34 )	1.91 (2.17)	

== International Broadcast ==
- Malaysia - NTV7 (Malaysia)
