= Hong Kong Technology Venture =

Hong Kong-based e-commerce company

Hong Kong Technology Venture Company Limited 香港科技探索有限公司
- Company type: Public
- Traded as: SEHK: 1137; Nasdaq: HKTV
- Industry: e-Commerce (formerly broadcasting)
- Founded: 19 May 1992; 34 years ago
- Headquarters: HKTV Multimedia and Ecommerce Centre, 1 Chun Cheong Street, Tseung Kwan O Industrial Estate, Tseung Kwan O
- Area served: Hong Kong
- Key people: Ricky Wong
- Services: HKTVMall
- Website: www.hktv.com.hk www.hktvmall.com

Hong Kong Technology Venture Company Limited (HKTV, Chinese: 香港科技探索有限公司) is a Hong Kong–based technology company primarily known for its e-commerce platform and once had plans to become a television station. HKTV currently provides an over-the-top shopping and entertainment ("shoppertainment") platform named HKTVMall.

Logo of its e-commerce platform – HKTVmall.

In 2009, HKTV (then-City Telecom) applied for domestic free-to-air television programme service licence, but was rejected by the Hong Kong government in October 2013. Later, HKTV acquired a mobile TV licence and planned to launch the first two channels but this plan was foiled again. It commenced live and video on demand broadcasting through internet on 19 November 2014, while refiling an application for a free-to-air licence. HKTV had fought a series of legal battles against the government, until it withdrew its application for free-to-air licence and surrendered its mobile television licenses to the Communications Authority in March 2018.

On 13 July 2021, the company changed its name from Hong Kong Television Network to Hong Kong Technology Venture.

== Background ==
Hong Kong Television Network Limited was formerly known as City Telecom (founded in 1992). City Telecom sold its main business Hong Kong Broadband Network in 2012. It then renamed as Hong Kong Television Network in order to attempt to enter the free-to-air television market of Hong Kong.

== History ==
=== Preparation of HKTV ===
In January 2013, City Telecom took on the name HKTV.

After submission of application for a domestic free television programme service licence in 2009, HKTV invested about HK$300 million and hired several hundred staff to produce TV series, and planned to invest HK$600 million into a new Television Production Centre at Tseung Kwan O Industrial Estate. Moreover, it released some trailers of the TV series on YouTube, which received mostly positive feedback. It planned to start broadcasting with six channels, and eventually expand to 30 in six years.

The licence application was rejected by the Hong Kong Government on 15 October 2013 amidst competition from television operators Fantastic Television and HK Television Entertainment. The government quoted 'gradual and orderly approach' as the sole reason for its decision and invited HKTV to challenge it in court by judicial review. There was a strong outcry against the decision from the general public.

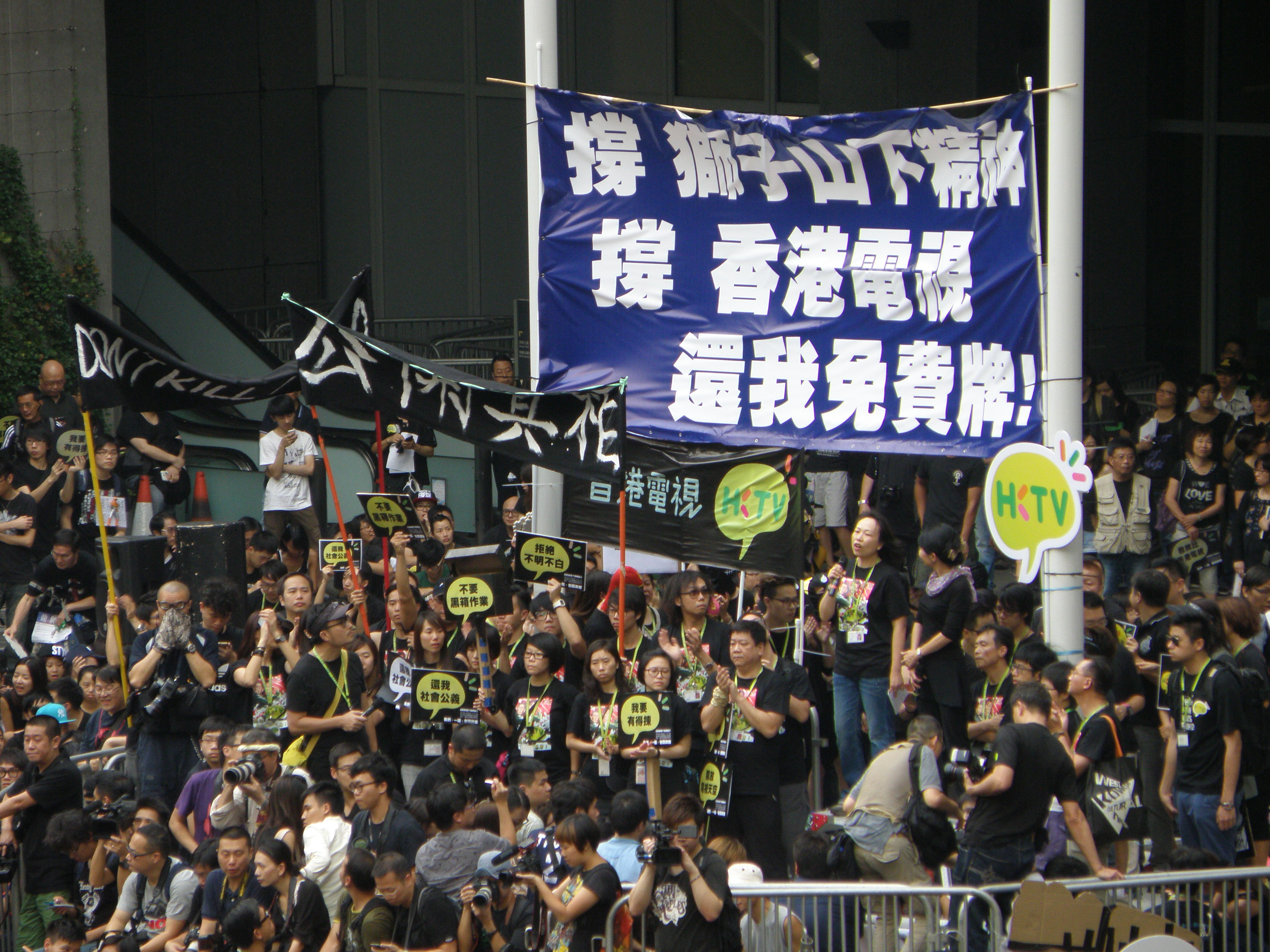
The staff of HKTV and the public protested on the Civic Square outside the Central Government Offices against the government's decision to deny HKTV's application.

On 20 October 2013, five days after the rejection of HKTV's TV licence application, crowds of protesters in black T-shirts including the staff of HKTV marched to request the government to issue the licence and demand an explanation. HKTV suggested that 80,000 people took part in the protest, while the police claimed that only 36,000 people joined. Protesters chanted "Stop monopoly in the TV market" as they thought that TVB was monopolising the market and they said "Stop black box politics" because the policy made by the Executive Council is not transparent to the public. The Facebook page that organised the march received about 500,000 "likes" within one week.

On 21 December 2013 HKTV acquired mobile TV licence and spectrum from CMHK, and planned to relaunch UTV on 1 July 2014 as HKTV. It also planned to broadcast through over-the-top format.

On 6 January 2014, HKTV filed an application for leave to apply for judicial review in respect of the Government's decision in rejecting HKTV's application for a domestic free TV programme service licence. which was accepted by the High Court.

On 11 April 2014, HKTV appealed for the judicial review on the broadcasting format of the Mobile Television service, which was accepted by the High Court. Meanwhile, HKTV applied again to the Communication Authority for the free Television Broadcasting license. Moreover, HKTV proposed to establish an online shopping center before the end of 2014, where customers can watch the new program produced continuously by HKTV.

In May 2014, HKTV planned to launch an online shopping website. The completed TV shows were planned to broadcast on this website to attract more local companies to get into this online business. The target group of HKTV online shopping website was middle-class families with an annual income of over HKD250,000. The business intended to maintain free TV production as its main focus, using e-commerce as an income source while the rejection of its license was challenged.

=== Launch of TV services ===
In late October 2014, HKTV launched an online vote for their favourite TV series out of an offer of sixteen, the winner to be broadcast on 19 November 2014.

On 19 November 2014, HKTV officially launched its channel, the same day Television Broadcasts Limited (TVB) started to broadcast in 1967. The main income was from advertising between 12–13 hours of programmes. In the early stages of its broadcasting, HKTV uploaded two hours of drama, half an hour of variety shows, plus four hours of programmes every day.

After launch, HKTV was exploring new business opportunities, including e-commerce, by consolidating mobile TV spectrum and over-the-top Internet platforms. Leveraging the strong brand presence and programme library of HKTV, it aims to build the largest and, in terms of number of brands, the most diversified products & services e-shopping mall in Hong Kong, providing one-stop shopping and round-the-clock services.

On 24 April 2015, the High Court ruled the rejection of HKTV's application as unlawful: when the Executive Council switched to a policy that limits the numbers of licences, it failed to follow the policy which encourages competition within the broadcasting industry as set forth in 1998. The court ordered the Exco to reconsider HKTV's application.

=== Focusing on online shopping platform ===
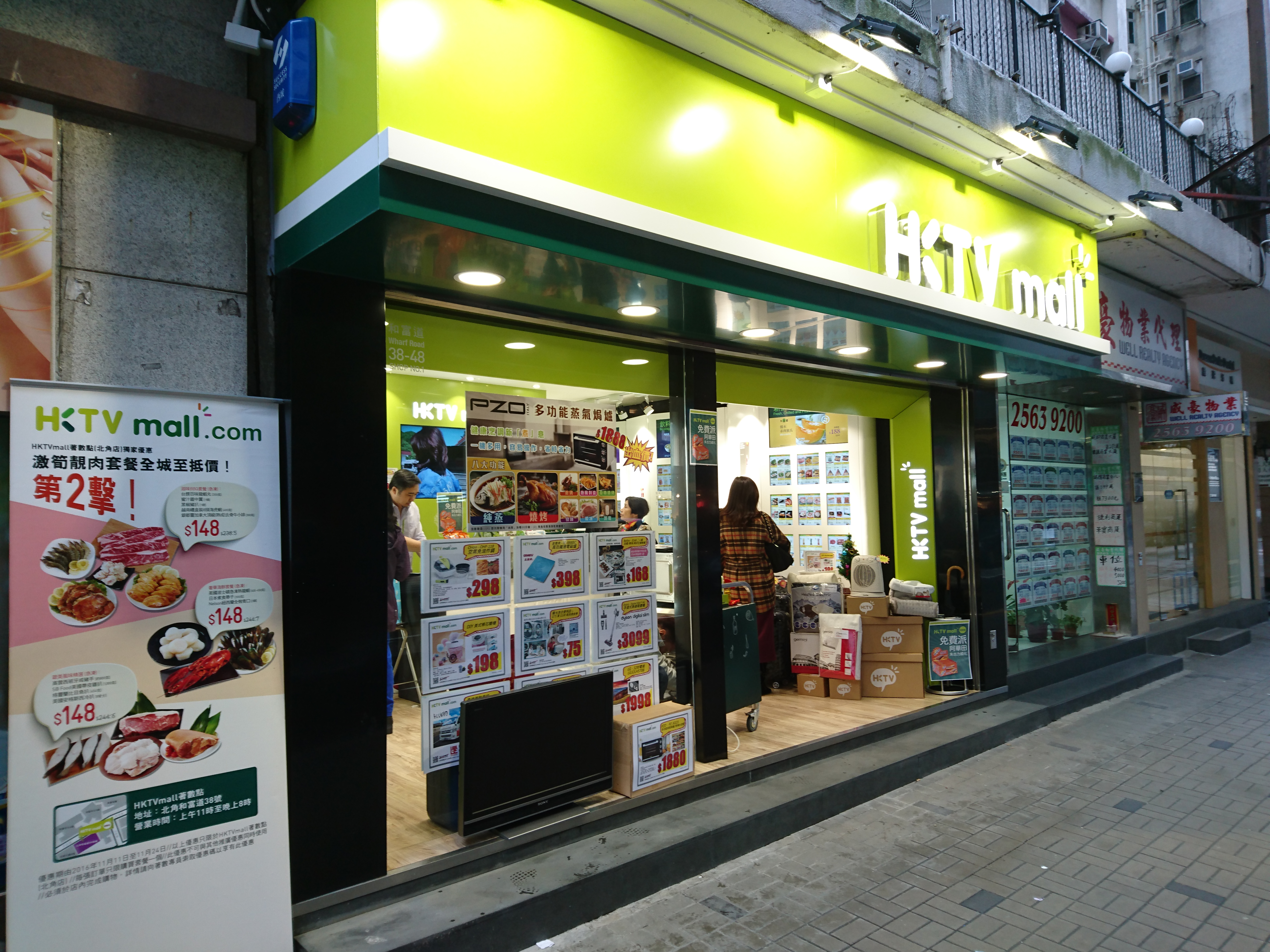
Physical store of the online platform – HKTVmall, in Wharf Road.

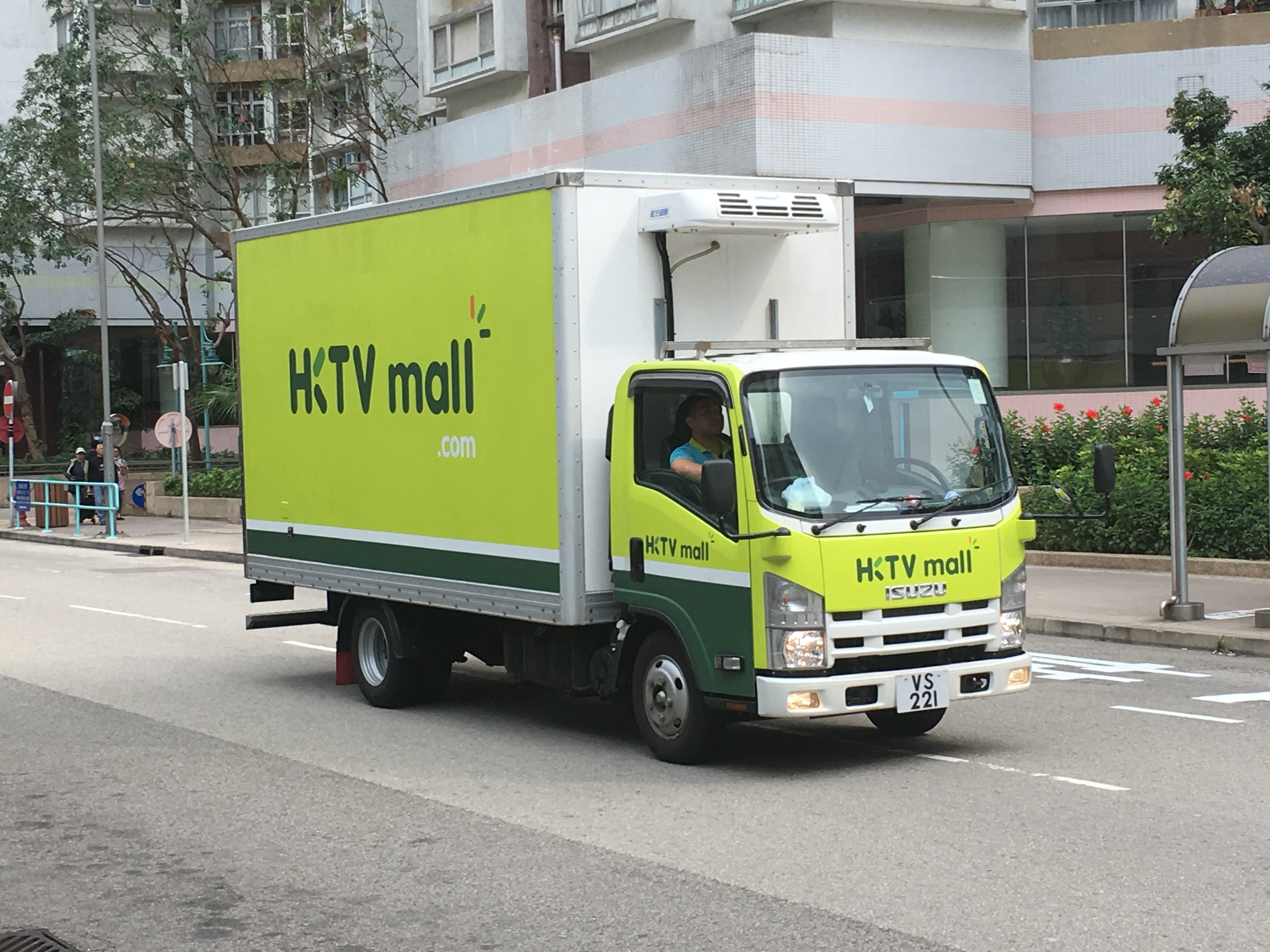
HKTV Mall vehicle.

In March 2018, HKTV announced that they have abandoned their television operations, and would continue to focus on its online shopping platform HKTVmall. The company also withdrew its free-to-air TV license application, and said it will return its mobile TV license to Hong Kong's Communications Authority.

== Senior Leadership ==
- Chairman: Paul Cheung (since January 2020)
- Chief Executive: Ricky Wong (since January 2020)

=== List of Former Chairmen ===
1. Ricky Wong (1992–2020)

=== List of Former Chief Executives ===
1. Paul Cheung (1992–2008)
2. William Yeung (2008–2012)
3. To Wai-bing (2012–2016)
4. Paul Cheung (2016–2020); second term

== Platforms ==
=== Television content ===
HKTV supports multiple platforms: personal computers, smart televisions, television boxes, smartphones and tablet computers. All smart TVs which are produced in and after 2012 can subscribe to the HKTV channel; Samsung, LG, Panasonic and Sony televisions allow their users to watch HKTV programmes through an application downloaded from the TV markets. Users of Android and iOS smartphones and tablet computers can download apps from Google Play Store and the App Store respectively. Besides, HKTV has planned to open more channels on Internet, smartphone, and set top box etc.

=== E-commerce ===
HKTVmall offers online shopping experience on lifestyle items on its website. It also supports Android and iOS devices and its app is available in Google Play Store and the App Store.

HKTVmall operates a network of self-service pick-up stores in Hong Kong. As of October 2020, it has a network of 68 stores.

== TV productions ==
By 31 August 2014, HKTV had produced 190 dramas, 70 variety shows and over 1000 hours' programmes.

A list of TV series produced by HKTV:

- The Election (2014–2015)
- The Borderline (2014)
- To Be or Not to Be (2014–2015)
- Once Upon a Song (2015)
- Incredible Mama (2015)
- Second Life (2015)
- The Menu (2015)
- Sexpedia (2015)
- Karma (2015)
- Beyond the Rainbow (2015)
- Love in Time (2015)
- Doom+5 (2015)
- The Wicked League (2015)
- P.4B (2015)
- Hidden Faces (2015)
- Night Shift (2015)
- Paranormal Mind (2015)

== Facilities ==
HKTV acquired land at Wan O Road and Wan Po Road in Tseung Kwan O Industrial Estate in 2011 to build their television production studios and plans to have it completed in 2014. The facility is located 2 kilometres north of TVB City.

Its online shopping platform is supported by a logistic centre at Kowloon Bay.

== See also ==
- City Telecom (Hong Kong)
