= Witness Insecurity (TV series) =

Hong Kong television series

- Official poster
- 護花危情
- Genre: Modern drama Romance
- Written by: Choi Ting Ting
- Starring: Linda Chung; Bosco Wong; Paul Chun; Ram Cheung; Queenie Chu; Cilla Kung; Savio Tsang; Angel Cheung
- Opening theme: "The Story Happily Ever After" by Linda Chung
- Country of origin: Hong Kong
- Original languages: Cantonese; Mandarin
- No. of episodes: 20

Production
- Producer: Lau Kar Ho
- Production location: Hong Kong
- Camera setup: Multi camera
- Production company: TVB

Original release
- Network: TVB Jade
- Release: 2 July – 27 July 2012

Related
- Master of Play; Ghetto Justice II

Witness Insecurity
- Traditional Chinese: 護花危情
- Simplified Chinese: 护花危情
- Literal meaning: "Dangerous Protection"
Transcriptions
Standard Mandarin
- Hanyu Pinyin: Hù Huā Wēi Qíng
Yue: Cantonese
- Jyutping: Wu6 Faa1 Ngai4 Cing4

Witness Insecurity (護花危情) is a modern TV drama produced by TVB and starring Linda Chung and Bosco Wong. The series was originally announced to be a spin-off of the 2011 series Yes, Sir. Sorry, Sir! featuring the popular character "Miss Cool" portrayed by Chung. A costume fitting press conference was held on 21 November 2011 at Tseung Kwan O TVB City Studio One Common Room at 12:30PM.

== Overview ==
Hui Wai-Sam (Bosco Wong) is a Witness Protection Unit (WPU) senior inspector whose team is assigned to protect the cellist Hailey Kiu Chi-Lam (Linda Chung), the daughter of a wealthy businessman Kiu Kong-San (Paul Chun), when Chi-Lam witnesses the assassin who attempted to kill Kong-San's brother Kiu Kong-Ho.

Because she had witnessed the death of her brother at a young age, Chi-Lam has since suffered from guilt and depression. Believing herself to be responsible for her brother's death, she gradually became anti-social and use her music to isolate herself from others. Wai-Sam's appearance in her life causes Lam to expand her horizons and she becomes much happier. Despite her father's opposition, Chi-Lam begins to pursue a romantic relationship with Wai-Sam.

As Wai-Sam works for the police, Kong-San is hesitant to allow Chi-Lam to continue her relationship with Wai-Sam because Wai-Sam's position could ruin Kong-San's status. To complicate matters further, his long-time enemy Lai Sue-Fung (Joseph Lee) reappears and threatens to unravel the origins of how Kong-San obtained his wealth. When Wai-Sam discovers the connection between Kong-San and Sue-Fung, he is torn between his duty to do what is just and his love for Chi-Lam.

== Cast ==
=== Main cast ===
Cast	Role	Description
Linda Chung	Kiu Chi Lam (Hailey) 喬子琳	Plays Cello; Comes from a rich family Suffers from posttraumatic stress disorder then recovers Has relationship story line with Hui Wai Sam
Bosco Wong	Hui Wai Sam 許瑋琛	Also known as Ah Sam; A Witness Protection Unit (WPU) Senior Inspector; Later a Senior Inspector of CID; Protects Kiu Chi Lam due to a murder case Has relationship story line with Kiu Chi Lam; Dies in episode 20 saving Chi Lam's Father
Paul Chun	Kiu Kong San 喬江山	Kiu Chi Lam's father Tries to stop Hui Wai Sam and Kiu Chi Lam from dating
Ram Chiang (蔣志光)	Kiu Kong Ho 喬江河	Also known as Ah Sui Kiu Chi Lam's uncle
Queenie Chu	Kelly	Kiu Chi Lam's psychiatrist
Cilla Kung (樂瞳)	Lee Hau Yan 李巧欣, "JoJo"	Lee Man Kit's older sister Has relation line with one of Hui Wai Sam's subordinate Hui Wai Sam's cousin

=== Other cast ===
Cast	Role	Description
Savio Tsang (曾偉權)	Poong Gwok Sing 潘國誠	CID superintendent
Angel Chiang (蔣家旻)	瑩	
Law Lok Lam (羅樂林)	翁瑞邦	
Stanley Cheung (張景淳)	Young Sapura	Younger version of Joseph Lee
Henry Lee	Hoh Siu Leung 何兆良	
Joseph Lee (李國麟)	Lai Sue Fung (Sapura) 黎樹風	Indonesian businessman
Lee Yee Man (李綺雯)	Jeung Lai Guen 張麗娟 (师姐)	WPU constable Hui Wai Sam's subordinate
Candy Chiu (趙靜儀)		Secretary
Rosanne Lui (呂珊)	Chan Yuk Lan 陳玉蘭	Lee Hau Yan and Lee Man Kit's mother Hui Wai Sam's aunt
Rachel Kan (簡慕華)	Tina	Kiu Gong San's second wife Kiu Chi Lam's stepmother
Bruce Li (李鴻傑)		
Brian Chu (朱敏瀚)	Lee Man Kit 李文傑	Lee Hau Yan's younger brother
Eric Li	Tong Chun Kai (Shawn) 唐俊佳	Son of a murdered hostage
Jones Lee (李忠希)		
Geoffrey Wong (黃子雄)	劉湛堃	WPU superintendent
Ronald Law (羅鈞滿)	Yang Yiu Tong (Brother) 楊耀東 (巴打)	WPU constable Later on became a CID with Hui Wai Sam Hui Wai Sam's subordinate Has relation line with Lee Hau Yan (Jojo) Dies in Ep.17 during a remote island mission
Jonathan Cheung (張穎康)	(Baau Taai) (爆呔)	
Kirby Lam (林秀怡)	Hoh Mei Si 何美詩	WPU constable Hui Wai Sam's subordinate
Deno Cheung (張松枝)	Ching Hok Kan 程學勤 （程Sir）	CID Senior Inspector
Lee Kai Kit (李啟傑)	Je Tin Wai 謝天偉	
Yeung Chiu Hoi (楊潮凱)	Gei Ho Chuen 紀浩全	
Ko Chun Man (高俊文)	Baau Kai Jung 包啟忠	Assistant Commissioner of Police

== Awards and nominations ==
2012 TVB Anniversary Awards

- Nominated(Top 5): Best Drama
- Nominated(Top 10): Best Actor (Bosco Wong)
- Nominated(Top 5): Best Actress (Linda Chung)
- Nominated(Top 10): Best Supporting Actor (Ram Chiang)
- Nominated(Top 10): My Favourite Male Character (Bosco Wong)
- Nominated(Top 5): Most Improved Female Artiste (Cilla Kung)

== Viewership ratings ==
The following is a table that includes a list of the total ratings points based on television viewership.

Week	Originally Aired	Episodes	Average Points	Peaking Points	References
1	2 July 2012	1	30	31	
1	July 2–6, 2012	1 — 4	30	33	
2	July 9–13, 2012	5 — 9	31	35	
3	July 16–20, 2012	10 — 14	32	35	
4	July 23–26, 2012	15 — 18	33	37	
4	July 23–27, 2012	15 — 20	33	37	
5	July 27, 2012	19 — 20	34	43	
1-4	July 1–27, 2012	Esp 1 - Esp 20	32	43	

== International broadcast ==
- Malaysia - 8TV (Malaysia)
- Singapore - Channel 8
