= Dinner for One, World for Two =

Dinner for One, World for Two (一人晚餐, 二人世界)

Studio album by Linda Chung
- Released: 20 August 2008
- Genre: Cantopop, Mandopop
- Producer: Star Entertainment Limited

Linda Chung chronology
Dinner for One, World for Two (一人晚餐, 二人世界) (2008)	My Love Story (2009)

Dinner for One, World for Two (Chinese: 一人晚餐, 二人世界; pinyin: Yi Ren Wancan, Er Ren Shijie) is the debut album by Linda Chung, and was released on 20 August 2008. It contains 10 tracks, two of those in Mandarin, while are the rest are in Cantonese. Two versions are published, one containing five postcards, while one contains a mini-poster. This is the first album published by a TVB artist who isn't a professional singer, following a series of artists like Myolie Wu getting assigned to various music companies to take advantage of their fame in the acting industry.

== Track listing ==
The tracks on the album are:

1. 一人晚餐 (Dinner for One)
2. 二人世界 (World for Two)
3. 我不懂你 (I don't know you)
4. 火柴天堂 (Matchstick Heaven)
5. 過山車 (Rollercoaster)
6. 其實我不快樂 (I'm actually unhappy)
7. 浪漫無聲 (Silent Romance)
8. 有沒有她 (With or without her)
9. 你不懂我的心 (You Won't Understand my Heart) (Mandarin)
10. 我不快樂 (I am unhappy) (Mandarin)

In the second version, Dinner for one, world for two reloaded, two new songs were added:

1. 彩雲國物語 (Saiunkoku Monogatari)
2. 發誓 (Swear)
- There are three covers on this album. "Dinner For One" (一人晚餐) is a cover of Ariel Lin's "Lonely Northern Hemisphere" (孤單北半球), "Silent Romance" (浪漫無聲) is a cover of Ariel Lin's "You" (你), and "World for Two" (二人世界) is a cover of Jolin Tsai's "Fall in Love with a Street" (愛上了一條街).

Linda's album was then proclaimed gold and "一人晚餐，二人世界 Reloaded" then was released with more songs and music videos.
