= Linda Chung =

Hong Kong-Canadian actress (born 1984)

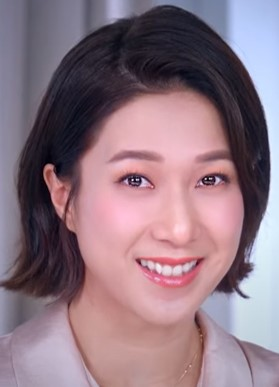
- Chung in 2022
- Born: 9 April 1984 (age 42); Maple Ridge, British Columbia, Canada
- Education: University of British Columbia
- Occupations: Actress; singer
- Years active: 2004–present
- Spouse: Jeremy Leung (m. 2015)
- Children: 3
- Awards: TVB Anniversary Awards – Most Improved Female Artiste; 2006 Always Ready; The Bitter Bitten; Forensic Heroes; Favourite TVB Actress in Malaysia; 2021 Kid's Lives Matter

Chinese name
- Traditional Chinese: 鍾嘉欣
- Simplified Chinese: 钟嘉欣/锺嘉欣
Transcriptions
Standard Mandarin
- Hanyu Pinyin: zhong jia xin
Yue: Cantonese
- Jyutping: zung^{1} gaa^{1} jan^{1}
- Musical career
- Origin: Hong Kong, China
- Labels: Star Entertainment (2008–11); Stars Shine International (2011–13); Voice Entertainment (2013–2018)
- Website: Linda Chung

Linda Chung Ka-yan (Chinese: 鍾嘉欣; pinyin: Zhōng Jiāxīn; born on 9 April 1984) is a Hong Kong-Canadian actress, singer and songwriter. She signed a long-term contract with TVB in 2004 after winning the Miss Chinese International Pageant. Chung ended her contract with TVB in early 2018.

As a singer, Chung has released four studio albums, Dinner for One, World for Two (2008), My Love Story (2009), My Private Selection (2011), and Love Love Love (2012).

Chung is currently a YouTube KOL.

== Early life ==
Chung was born in Maple Ridge and raised in Vancouver, British Columbia with an older brother and sister. After graduation from Vancouver's Templeton Secondary School, Chung studied education at the University of British Columbia for two years.

Beginning her public life in 2002, Chung won the title of Miss Crystal Cover Girl, a beauty-talent contest organised and hosted annually by Crystal Mall, an Asian-themed shopping centre located in the Metrotown area of Burnaby, British Columbia.

In 2003, Chung won the title of Miss Chinese Vancouver, along with three other awards at the same event, earning her the chance to participate, and eventually winning Miss Chinese International at the Miss Chinese International Pageant 2004, hosted in Hong Kong. She was praised by Kelly Chen for her sweet face and voice the day before this pageant. Chung became the third contestant from Vancouver in four years to win the title of this annually-held event.

== TV career ==
=== 2004–2005: Entry and initial success ===
After winning the Miss Chinese International Pageant, Chung was signed under TVB. Chung made her acting debut in the series Virtues of Harmony II, the modern spin-off of the sitcom, Virtues of Harmony. Her performance was somewhat popular in the year, garnering positive reviews from the public. She was nominated for the Most Improved Female Actress award at the 2004's TVB Anniversary Awards for the first time. Chung also participated in several advertisements and music videos within her first year in the industry. This initial success led TVB to name her as one of the "Twelve New Stars."

Other industry professionals also gave praise to Chung during this initial period such as Nancy Sit, Frankie Lam, Kara Hui, Shawn Yue, Chen Kun, Kent Cheng, Sammy Leung, Wong He, Joey Leung and Erica Yuen.

=== 2006–2008: Breakthrough and A-grade actress ===
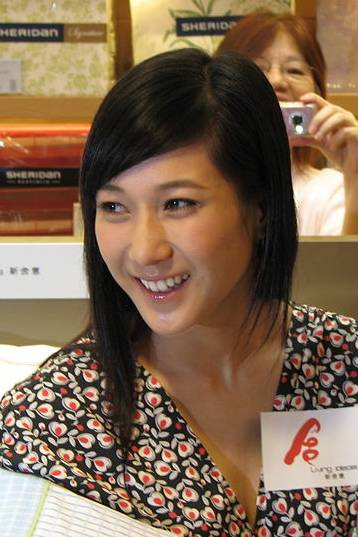
Chung in 2007

In 2006, after starring in Always Ready, The Biter Bitten and Forensic Heroes, Chung won her first major award "Most Improved Female Actress.

Chung's breakthrough role came in 2007, where she played a character named Sheung Joy Sum (lit. meaning: always at heart) in a popular series of that year, Heart of Greed. Chung received much praise from audiences and several famous people. A couple of scenes involving her character generated the highest peaks for the drama's ratings, one was when her character exposed that Alfred Ching Leung deceived her, garnering a 39-point rating; another was when Tong Chi On proposed marriage to her, garnering a 48-point rating. This role gave her a nomination for Best Actress and My Most Favourite Female Character Role for the second year in a row.

During the shooting of A Journey Called Life, Chung received much praise from co-star Steven Ma, for her beauty, good manner, and ripe acting. The two have worked together in a previous collaboration of Virtues of Harmony II.

Among the five series that were released in 2008, Chung received most recognition for her acting in A Journey Called Life. She received praises from Sheren Tang as well as the public. At the 41st TVB Anniversary Awards (2008), Chung was nominated in the top 5 of the Best Actress award for her role in this series. She was also nominated for the top 5 Most Favorite Female Character Award for Legend of the Demigods, her first leading role in a period drama. Chung then acted as Yu So Sum in Moonlight Resonance and received some recognitions for this role. A scene in the drama, telling her fierce exchange with Yan Hung, garnered a 50-point rating, making it the most-watched scene in all TVB series to-date. Chung also received praises from Ha Yu, Michelle Yim and Lee Heung-kam when she was acting this role.

=== 2009–2010: Success in comedy and villain works ===
In 2009, Chung performed in Ghost Writer, A Watchdog's Tale, Twilight Investigation, as well as Can't Buy Me Love. At the 42nd TVB Anniversary Awards (2009), Chung was nominated top 5 in the Best Supporting Actress for her role in The Gem of Life and this role received praise from Ada Choi, Lee San San and Maggie Shiu.

In 2010, Chung had four series, A Watchdog's Tale released in 2009 actually, but the series got the highest audience rating in the first season in 2010 and top five series in audience rating in the whole year. In A Watchdog's Tale, Chung got another breakthrough while she was acting a likeness of the masculine role. At the 2010 TVB Anniversary Awards, Chung was nominated top 5 in the Best Actress award for her role in Ghost Writer and also nominated top 5 in the Most Favourite Female Character Role award for her role in Can't Buy Me Love. Twilight Investigation was another series in the year, her acting has got approbated yet.

=== 2011–2012: Outstanding years ===
While Chung was filming the period drama River of Wine in December 2010, she received praise from Bowie Lam as for her weeping scene. Chung was also captured by media to be the "successor of fa-dan" and one of the "Best new-coming fa-dan" with Myolie Wu, Kate Tsui and Fala Chen as the first-class performance of Chung in several series before the day.

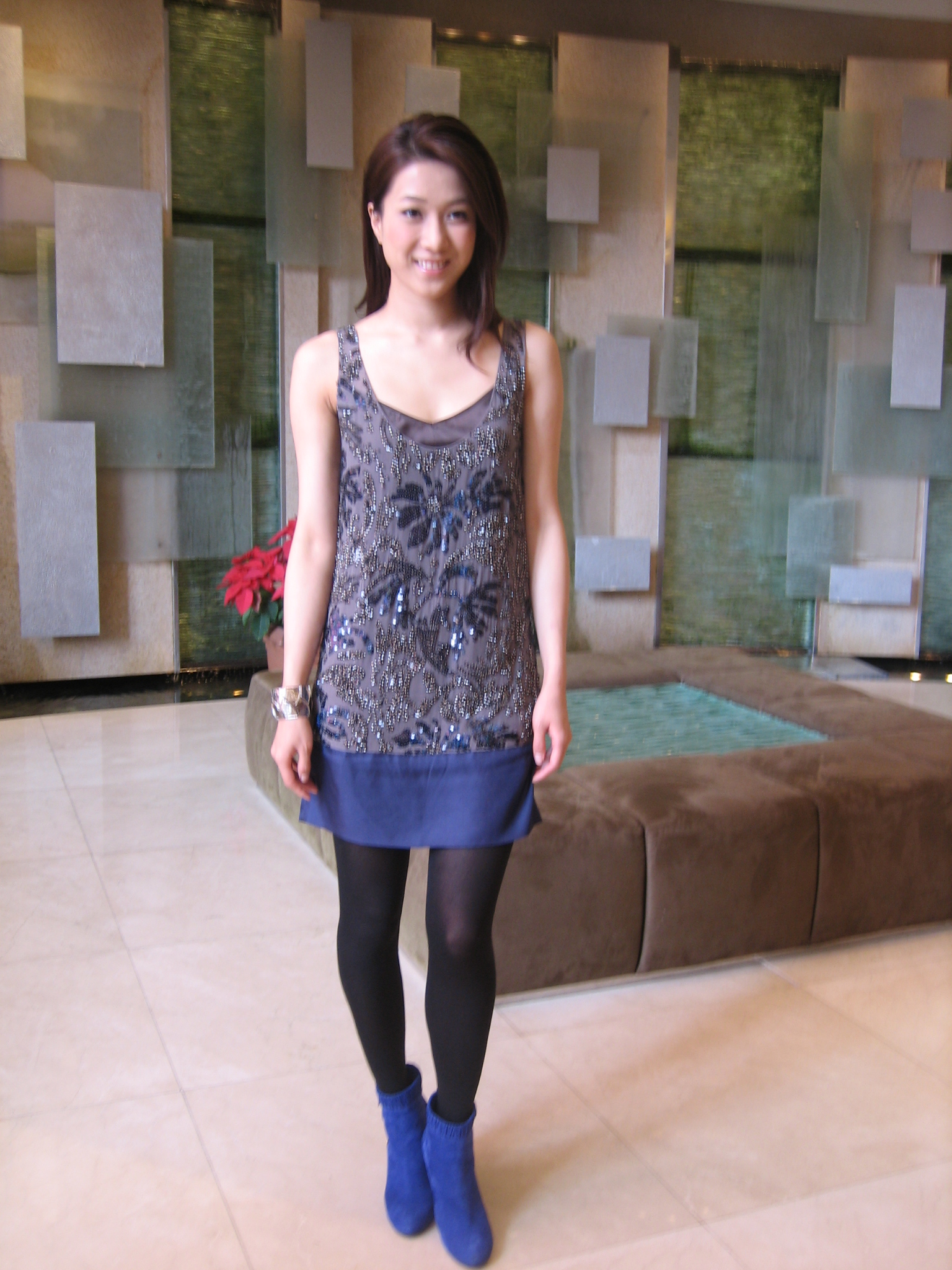
Chung in 2011

In 2011, Chung was the second female lead in Yes, Sir. Sorry, Sir!. She had just played her character Miss Koo from the 8th episode till the end. Although she only had unrequited love for one of the male lead in the series (Moses Chan), she became the focus for the audience and internet users by the three sections of Miss Koo. First, she appeared as a cool bowling coach initially. Next, Miss Koo seems to be a melting glacier as she was affected by Law Sir (Moses Chan's character), this made the audience pay enthusiastic attention on their sweet and emotional scenes. When it was nearly came to an end, Law Sir's undercover identity was finally revealed, Miss Koo was collapsed since she has been deceived by Law Sir and her sister (Queenie Chu's character). This also left a deep impression in the audiences' mind. The audiences had massive praises for her performance and agreed that she was perfectly capable of competing in Best Actress category for this role at the year-end awards ceremony, despite being second female lead. It was rare that the major newspapers also reported the above matter at the same time. She was not only supported by Chan and Yeung, but she also supported by Queenie Chu, Cilla Kung and Lau Ka Ho. On the whole, Chung received full of praise and Miss Koo is one of the representative work for Linda Chung.

With Chung's performances till mid 2011, TVB Anniversary Awards Best Actress Charmaine Sheh, Hong Kong Film Award for Best Director Gordon Chan, Hong Kong Film director Patrick Kong, Hong Kong CR1 DJ, TVB actress Helen Ma, Kate Tsui and Myolie Wu praised support for her either to be the next "Best Actress" or to get an award in TVB Anniversary Awards, or to be the first-actress.

Finally, she was nominated for Top 5 Best Actress and Most Favourite Female Character Role award for her role in Yes, Sir. Sorry, Sir!. She got the My Most Supportive Performance award from Ming Pao Anniversary Awards in 2011 for Miss Koo in Yes Sir, Sorry Sir according to voting from audience. However, Miss Koo lost out the Most Favourite Female Character Role award at the 2011 TVB Anniversary Awards.

Chung filmed L'Escargot in 2010 and it was finally aired in 2012. Her character was involved in a complicated love triangle with Michael Tse and Ron Ng's characters. She herself spoke about the many new challenges she faced while portraying her character. In addition, her relation line with Tse has gained her more public exposure and was the topic of popular discussion. Her show was praised by Gem Tang, Felix Wong and Hinson Chou. On 19 March 2012, her new series Daddy Good Deeds aired and her character Ko Yu-chu spread fun to the public. Her professional attitude and acting were praised by Cilla Kung, Xia Yu and Steven Ma, especially Ma mentioned she was still maintaining the purity of heart and having progress in her acting continually. She and Steven Ma collaborated five times in TVB. Her third series House of Harmony and Vengeance was aired on TVB from 30 Apr to 8 June 2012. Her fourth series, Witness Insecurity, was aired from 2 to 27 July 2012.

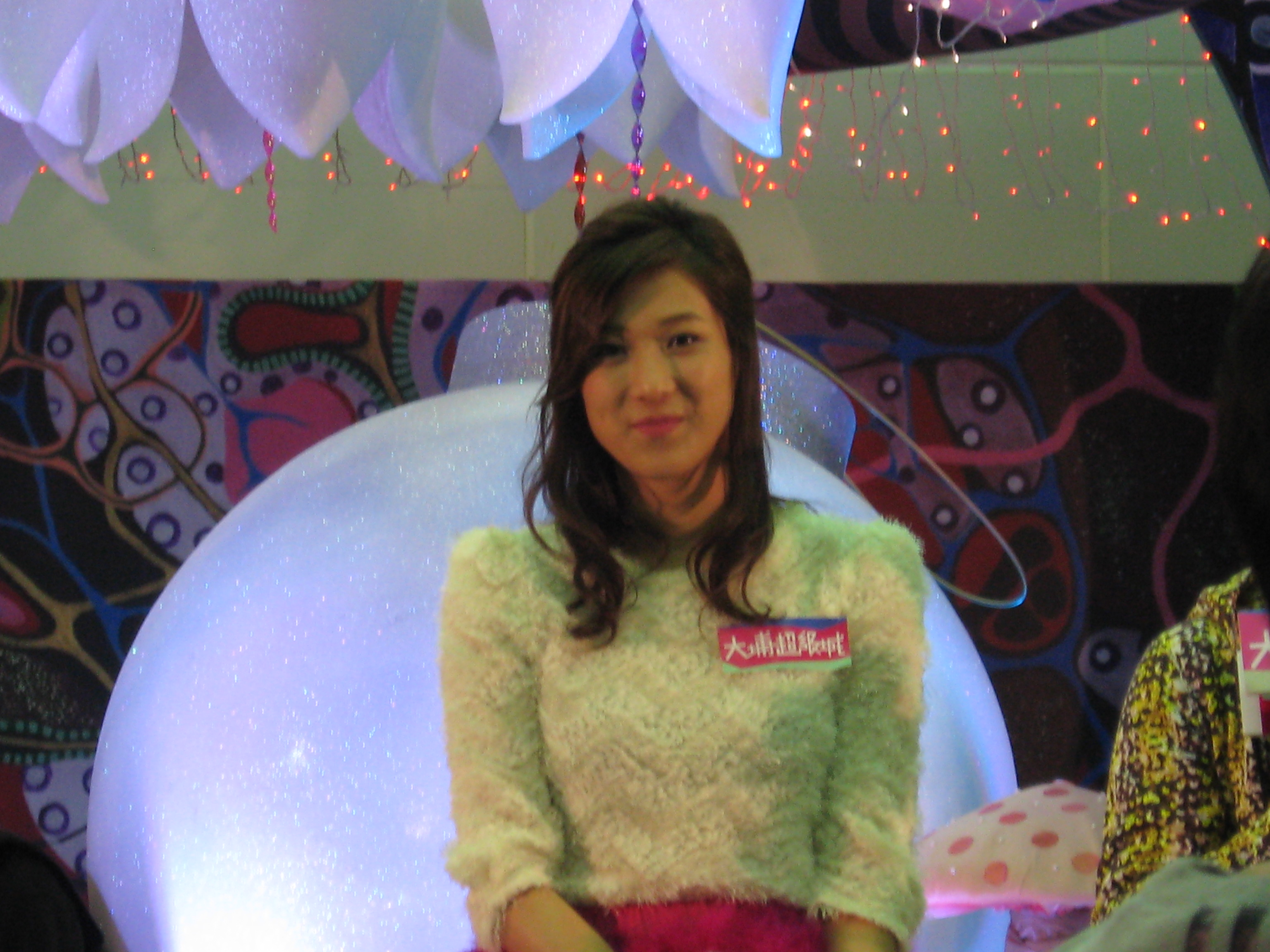
Chung at Taipo Centre in 2012

In the series Missing You, Chung was leading other new actors and actresses such as Jason Chan, Cilla Kung, Lin Xia Wei, and Calvin Chan. Ram Chiang was the only senior actor there.

=== 2013–2014: Stepped to the peak ===
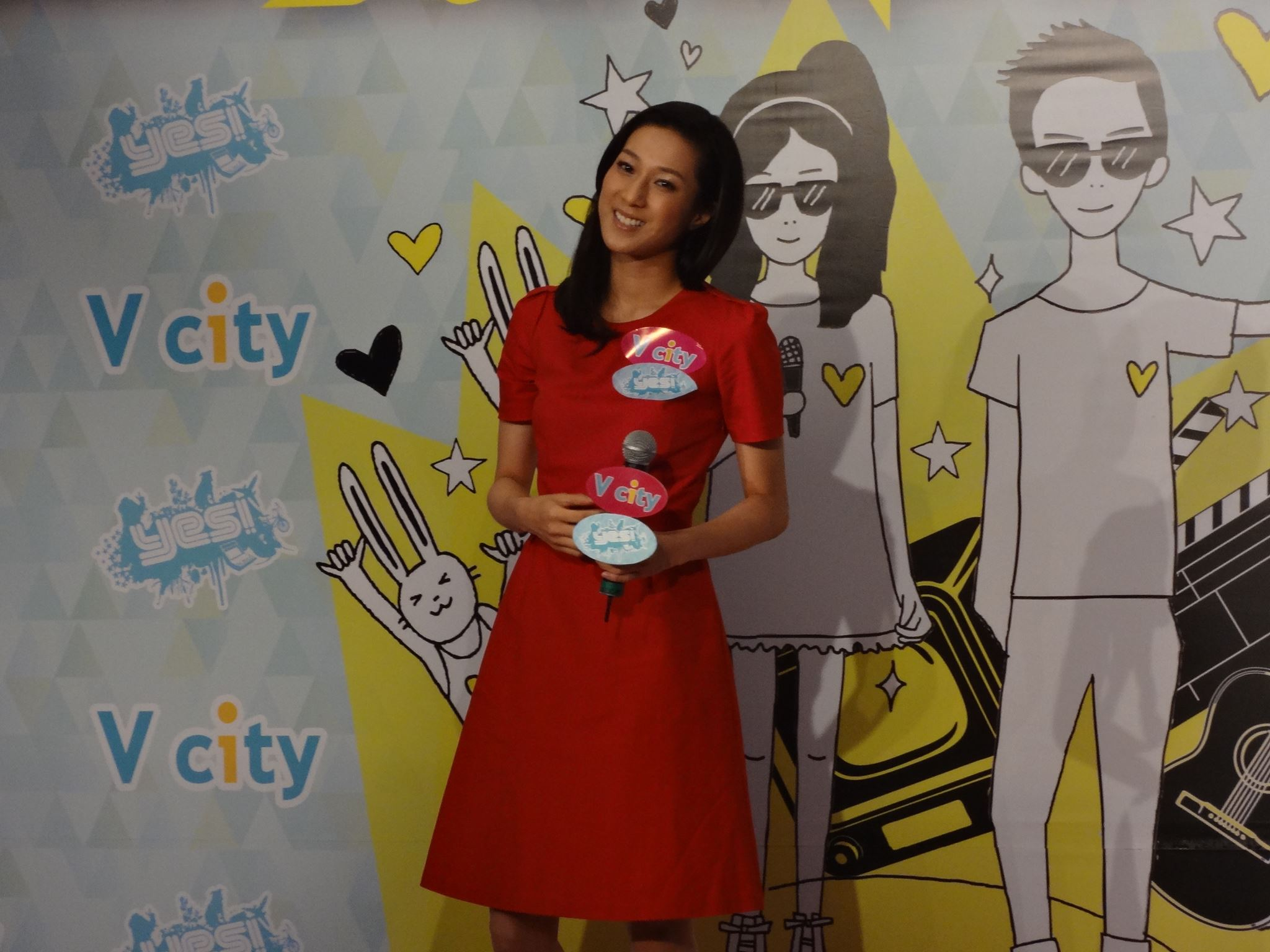
Chung in 2013

In 2013, Chung won the champion of "Ten TV entertainer" by public voting in the Next TV Publishing Ceremony 2013. She has already gained top ten of the TV entertainer for six years consecutively, which proofing her popularity and outstanding performance in the past years. Chung also won the Most Popular Actress in the largest film forum "Vietnam DMA awards ceremony" of the Year Award in two consecutive years in Vietnam.

In May, Chung participated in the variety show Office of Practical Jokes, presided by Johnson Lee. Chung starred in 2013 TVB's grand productions 30 episodes Brother's Keeper, co-starring with Ruco Chan. She acted as a fashion designer Rachel Cheuk. The series spans from 1991 to 2013. Chung and her co-star Ruco Chan became a screen couple as their co-operation gaining high popularity in the public. Chung gained support by co-star Ruco Chan, Joe Ma, Fala Chen, Joey Man, Tavia Yeung, Niki Chow, Kate Tsui, Myolie Wu, and so on, to get the "Best Actress" that year. On 1 December 2013, Chung finally got her first Best Actress in "TVB Awards Ceremony 2013 Malaysia Star Ceremony", as the award is 100% by public voting. Chung was not only gained the "Best Actress", but she also gained the My Favorite TV Role, became the first 1980s artist to win the "Best Actress" title.

In 2014, Chung filmed the TVB Gold New Year micro film A Time of Love, starring with South Korea actor Yeon Jung-hoon. Their segment was the most popular episode in the whole set although broadcast on Saturday, gained up to 28 points in rating.

On 26 March, the Hong Kong University of Science and Technology invited Chung to a one-hour lecture of "Meet the Professional Series III: Road to Leading Actress – Linda Chung" as the theme for sharing with students about the choice of life, transformation, and practice the ideal. Chung is the first Hong Kong TV actress to be a lecturer who was invited to the university.

Her series for 2014 were Tiger Cubs II and All That Is Bitter Is Sweet.

=== 2015–2018: End works in TVB ===
Chung's only series for 2015 is Limelight Years, co-starred with Damian Lau, Liza Wang, Alex Fong among others.

In 2016, Chung starred in the drama K9 Cop alongside Bosco Wong, and made a brief appearance in the sequel of her 2013 series Brother's Keeper, Brother's Keeper II.

In 2018, she made a guest appearance in Another Era, starring opposite Frankie Lam.

On 7 March 2018, Chung revealed that she would no longer be a part of TVB, stating that she has decided to leave TVB after 13 years with the company. She wrote, "I remember being only 19 when I joined Miss Chinese International and not understanding anything, no self-confidence, and was very shy. TVB was my shelter. They taught me many things and gave me the opportunity to grow and develop myself, help me discover who I am, my talent, and my mission. They gave me the courage to show my true self to the public." Linda also mentioned several names that she is in gratitude for, including TVB Executive Virginia Lok whom she described as a mother figure who protected her, and Catherine Tsang, who gave Linda her first break. She also thanked Voice Entertainment's Herman Ho, for helping her achieve her dream of becoming a singer, and TVB Executive Sandy Yue, who gave her the opportunity to gain more experience from doing variety shows."Finally, thank you very much for all the other executives of TVB's top management. Without your hard work and support, I will not be at where I am today. I am forever grateful! We may be saying goodbye now, but I do feel like we are going to meet again soon," she added.

=== 2019–present: Open-ended ===
In 2020, Chung returned to TVB and filmed the medical drama Kids' Lives Matter. The drama was broadcast in 2021.

In 2022, Chung mentioned she won't return to TVB in the future on the stage of TVB anniversary award 2021, she also added her feelings in YouTube channel. However, Chung mentioned she loves ViuTV newcomers Mirror consecutively in public instead of TVB newcomers, especially Anson Lo and Keung To. She also stated she may accept any offers in future years at public event, including ViuTV.

== Film career ==
=== 2007: Newcomer ===
When Chung filmed her first film, Love Is Not All Around, alongside Alex Fong, Stephy Tang and Sammy Leung in 2007, she was praised by its director Patrick Kong. She was nominated for "Best New Performer" for her role Ching Ching and won the Silver Award. Chung has already succeeded in entering the films industry, the same year as Kate Tsui.

=== 2008–2010: Leading ===
Chung first became the leading actress in the film Playboy Cops in 2008. She received praises in the last scenes. She acted as a guest star in the similar movie of Love Is Not All Around, L for Love, L for Lies, where she also got praise from the performance.

Her latest film in 2010 is 72 Tenants of Prosperity.

== Music career ==
=== 2008–2009: First attempt at success ===
In addition to acting, Chung used to receive praise in some live show for her singing. Chung has sung the theme songs for some of the series that she has starred in then, including her first personal song "Swear" for Legends of Demigods, Best Bet, A Journey Called Life, A Watchdog's Tale and the subtheme for Heart of Greed. Chung has also sung the children's songs, which were welcomed by children. In May 2008, Chung signed a deal with Star Entertainment which launched her into a successful music career. Her first album was released on 20 August. Her album Dinner for One, World for Two achieved Gold Status in Hong Kong based on the number of sales and she earned the title of "The Best Selling Female Newcomer" in the year. This album garnered her several awards at the end of 2008, including "Gold Newcomer Awards" and "Most liked Female Newcomer." Her first plugged song was "World for Two". Her second plugged song "I'm actually unhappy" got a high click rating in YouTube. Due to its success, Star Entertainment released a second version of her album, Dinner for One, World for Two Reloaded, which included more songs and more bonus material.

Her second album, My Love Story, was released on 12 November 2009 and has since been classified gold. The songs of "Thinking of you day and night", "One Day" and "Life and Death for Love" were all owe to her works on melody. Among these three songs, "Thinking of you day and night" was the first plugged song and was much more conspicuous. Chung won awards in different music platforms based on this song. "Fighting in the light and shadows" was the second plugged song. She has since collaborated with another Star Entertainment singer, Stephanie Cheng. "Ngoi Dak Hei (Ai De Qi)" is the product of their co-operation. This song reached the champion on TVB's JSG Solid Gold programme.

=== 2010–2011: Approved works ===
Her new song "If You Want Me" has just released in January 2011. Chung was praised by CR2 DJ Vani Wong, Alton Yu and Wasabi for her outstanding performance. Apart from the above, she received much praises from three DJ who are in the CR2 "The Playtoy Mansion" program and she was also praised by Sammy Leung and Siu Yi in the CR2 "Good Morning King" program in February, for her "Jade Girl" image which is not only an image in the entertainment industry, but she also behaves in reality.

In 2011, her third album, My Private Selection, was released on 25 March. The album was qualitatively new songs plus choiceness. It was not only recorded her first plugged song "If you want me", but it also recorded another four new recording songs "Luo Suo", "De Xian Zhao Ni", "I'll Be Waiting For You", "Ngoi Dak Hei (Ai De Qi) solo version" and her thirteen choiceness songs from Dinner for One, World for Two debut album and My Love Story.

=== 2012–present: Love Love Love and solo concerts ===
In 2012, Chung released her 4th studio album Love Love Love. This album has been certified Gold and sold out quickly. The album reached the No. 1 in sales chart and entered the sales chart of the LP Chamber of Commerce in Hong Kong for more than 5 weeks, gaining No. 2 for 2 weeks. Her first plug Vaccine reached No. 1 of JSG chart and her second plug You are my other half reached No. 1 of 3 musical chart, including RTHK, MRHNA and JSG. She is the first and only TVB Canadian pop singer who got three No. 1 in the four major musical charts in the nearest 12 years. Stars Shine, Chung's music company, compiled and released a second edition of the album, removing one song and including the theme song of her currently airing series Missing You. Chung gained her first "Female Singer Award" in MRHNA Musical Ceremony 2012, which continued gained the same award in 2013.

==== First solo concert ====
In August 2013, Chung held her first solo concert dated 22 and 23 August. It was held at Kowloon Bay Trade & Exhibition Centre, with Janice M. Vidal, newcomer Ally Tse, and female singer Kelly Chen as guests.

In December 2014, Chung held "Most Blessing" Live Concert in Malaysia 2014 on 20 December at Arena of Stars. She invited Kristal Tin and Alex Fong as guest performers. The concert achieved a great success.

== Personal life ==
In 2014, Chung was invited to speak at the Hong Kong University of Science and Technology. She spoke about her battle with depression after joining the entertainment industry. At the start of her career, Linda faced severe pressure from a heavy workload and suffered loneliness from being far away from home. She said: "I didn’t know anything so I had a lot of pressure. I was also afraid to talk to someone about it, especially those close to me. During that time, I would cry as soon as I returned home." She eventually worked through the hard times and gained her emotional strength.

As part of TVB, Chung was "the youngest A-grade actress, and the highest paid TVB actress, earning around HK$120,000 per event, until 2015. Chung is also a devoted Christian and Philip Ng is her ex-boyfriend.

Chung married chiropractor Jeremy Leung in fall 2015. Chung announced her pregnancy on Mother's Day 2016. She revealed on 27 August 2016 that she had given birth to a daughter named Kelly Leung. She announced the birth of her second child, Jared Leung, on 6 September 2018. On 10 April 2022, Chung announced on Instagram that she was pregnant with the couple's third child.

== Filmography ==
=== Television dramas ===
Year	Title	Role	Awards
2004	Virtues of Harmony II	Hung Bak-nam (Michelle)	Nominated – TVB Anniversary Award for Most Improved Female Artiste: Pairs up with Hawick Lau, Steven Ma; Garnering a 36-point rating, average in 29-point rating
2004	Love Stories at Regalia Bay	Ling	Guest Star
2005	The Zone	Cathy	Pairs up with Ben Wong; starred in unit 9
2005	Always Ready	Sze Chor Kei (Sandra)	Won — TVB Anniversary Award for Most Improved Female Artiste; Nominated – Astro Wah Lai Toi Award for My Favorite Onscreen Couple; Nominated – Astro Wah Lai Toi Drama Award for My Favorite Character: Pairs up with Ekin Cheng; Garnering a 31-point rating, average in 23-point rating
2006	The Biter Bitten	Lo Dan	Won — TVB Anniversary Award for Most Improved Female Artiste: Pairs up with Benny Chan; Shown in TVB Sales Presentation 2006; Garnering a 36-point rating, average in 30-point rating
2006	Forensic Heroes	Lam Ding-ding	Won — TVB Anniversary Award for Most Improved Female Artiste; Won — 8 Weekly for The Perfect Screen Lover: Pairs up with Frankie Lam; Shown in TVB Sales Presentation 2006; Garnering a 43-point rating, average in 33-point rating, no.2 rating in 2006
2007	Heavenly In-Laws	Flower Princess (Ji Mei)	Pairs up with Joey Leung; Shown in TVB Sales Presentation 2006
2007	Best Bet	To Lai-ying (Sheila)	Pairs up with Michael Tse; Shown in TVB Sales Presentation 2007; Garnering a 32-point rating, average in 27-point rating
2007	Heart of Greed	Sheung Joy-sum	Nominated – TVB Anniversary Award for Best Actress; Nominated – TVB Anniversary Award for My Favourite Female Character (Top 5); Won — Astro Wah Lai Toi Drama Award for My Favourite Character; Nominated – Astro Wah Lai Toi Award for Best Actress (Top 5); Won — Next Magazine TV for Best Artist (Pos.9); Won — Astro Wah Lai Toi Awards for My Favorite on Screen Couple: Pairs up with Moses Chan, Raymond Lam; Shown in TVB Sales Presentation 2007; Garnering a 48-point rating, average in 32-point rating, no.3 rating in 2007
2008	A Journey Called Life	Sze Ka-ka	Nominated – TVB Anniversary Award for Best Actress (Top 5); Nominated – Astro Wah Lai Toi Drama Award for Best Actress (Top 5); Won — Astro Wah Lai Toi Drama Award for My Favourite Character: Pairs up with Steven Ma; Garnering a 35-point rating, average in 30-point rating, no.8 rating in 2008
2008	Forensic Heroes II	Lam Ding-ding	Guest Star; Pairs up with Frankie Lam; Shown in TVB Sales Presentation 2008; Garnering a 33-point rating in first week, no.4 rating in 2008
2008	Moonlight Resonance	Yu So-sum	Won — Next Magazine TV 2009 for Best Artiste (Pos.6); Nominated – Astro Wah Lai Toi Award for My Favorite on Screen Couple (Top 5): Pairs up with Raymond Lam, Bosco Wong; Shown in TVB Sales Presentation 2008; Garnering a 50-point rating, average in 35-point rating, no.1 rating in 2008 and no.9 rating in TVB
2008	Legend of the Demigods	Gai Choi-chi	Nominated – TVB Anniversary Award for My Favourite Female Character (Top 5): Pairs up with Sunny Chan; Shown in TVB Sales Presentation 2007; Garnering a 32-point rating, average in 27-point rating
2008–2009	The Gem of Life	Sung Chi-ling (Elise)	Nominated – TVB Anniversary Award for Best Supporting Actress (Top 5): Pairs up with Moses Chan, Bosco Wong; Shown in TVB Sales Presentation 2007, 2008; Garnering a 37-point rating, average in 28-point rating
2009–2010	A Watchdog's Tale	Lai Sin-yu (Sammi)	Won — Next Magazine TV 2010 for Best Artist (Pos.6): Pairs up with Steven Ma; Shown in TVB Sales Presentation 2009; Garnering a 36-point rating, average in 31-point rating, no.5 rating in 2009
2010	Ghost Writer	Lau Sum-yu	Nominated – TVB Anniversary Award for Best Actress (Top 5); Won — MY AOD Favourite Award for My Favourite Character; Won — Next Magazine TV 2010 for Best Artist (Pos.6): Pairs up with Steven Ma; Shown in TVB Sales Presentation 2009,2010; Garnering a 41-point rating, average in 30-point rating, no.8 rating in 2010
2010	Can't Buy Me Love	Ng Say-duk	Nominated – TVB Anniversary Award for My Favourite Female Character (Top 5): Pairs up with Raymond Wong; Shown in TVB Sales Presentation 2010; Garnering a 45-point rating, average in 34-point rating
2010	Twilight Investigation	Chung Yee-tak	Won — Next Magazine TV 2012 for Best Artist (Pos.5): Pairs up with Wong He; Shown in TVB Sales Presentation 2010; Garnering a 31-point rating, average in 28-point rating
2011	Yes, Sir. Sorry, Sir!	Koo Ka-nam (Carman/ Miss Koo)	Nominated – TVB Anniversary Award for Best Actress (Top 5); Nominated – TVB Anniversary Award for My Favourite Female Character (Top 5); Nominated – Ming Pao Anniversary Award for Outstanding Actress in Television; Won — Ming Pao Anniversary Award for My Most Supportive Performance; Nominated – My AOD Favourite Awards for Best Actress (Top 5); Won — My AOD Favourite Award for My Top 15 Favourite Characters; Won — StarHub TVB Awards for My Favorite TVB on Screen Couple: Pairs up with Moses Chan; Shown in TVB Sales Presentation 2011; Garnering a 38-point rating, average in 29-point rating, no.6 rating in 2011
2011	River of Wine	Sung Chi-ching	Pairs up with Sunny Chan; Shown in TVB Sales Presentation 2011; Garnering a 34-point rating, average in 27-point rating
2011	Super Snoops	Sze Ying	Guest Star; Pairs up with Lawrence Ng; Garnering a 37-point rating, average in 34-point rating in week 3
2012	L'Escargot	Kwan Ka-lok	Won — StarHub TVB Awards 2012 – My Favorite TVB Female Character: Pairs up with Ron Ng, Michael Tse; Shown in TVB Sales Presentation 2011; Garnering a 40-point rating, average in 28-point rating
2012	Daddy Good Deeds	Ko Yu-chu	Pairs up with Steven Ma; Shown in TVB Sales Presentation 2012; Garnering a 35-point rating, average in 30-point rating
2012	House of Harmony and Vengeance	Bin Yuk-yin	Pairs up with Evergreen Mak; Shown in TVB Sales Presentation 2012; Garnering a 35-point rating, average in 29-point rating
2012	Witness Insecurity	Kiu Tze-lam (Hailey)	Won — Next Magazine TV 2013 for Best Artist (Pos.1); Won — StarHub TVB Awards 2013 – My Favorite TVB Female Character; Nominated – TVB Anniversary Award for Best Actress (Top 5); Nominated – My AOD Favourite Award for Best Actress (Top 5); Won — My AOD Favourites Award for Top 15 Character; Nominated – My AOD Favourites Award for Best Couple (Top 5): Pairs up with Bosco Wong; Shown in TVB Sales Presentation 2012; Garnering a 39-point rating, average in 31-point rating, no.1 rating in 2012
2012–2013	Missing You	Hong Yu-fung	Pairs up with Jason Chan; Garnering a 31-point rating, average in 26-point rating
2013	Brother's Keeper	Cheuk Ching (Rachel)	Won — TVB Star Awards Malaysia 2013 – My Favourite TVB Actress in a Leading Role; Won — My Favourite Top 15 TVB Drama Characters (1 of 15 winners); Nominated – TVB Star Award Malaysia for Best Couple (Top 5); Nominated – TVB Anniversary Award for Best Actress (Top 5); Nominated – TVB Anniversary Award for My Favourite Female Character (Top 5): Pairs up with Ruco Chan; Shown in TVB Sales Presentation 2013; Garnering a 33-point rating, average in 27-point rating, no.9 rating in 2013
2014	A Time of Love	Linda	Chapter of South Korea; Pairs up with Yeon Jung-hoon; Garnering a 28-point rating, average in 26-point rating, highest rating in A Time of Love
2014	All That Is Bitter Is Sweet	Dou Gaai-kei	Won — StarHub TVB Awards 2014 – My Favorite TVB Female Character; Won — TVB Star Awards Malaysia 2014 – My Favourite Top 15 TVB Drama Characters (1 of 15 winners): Pairs up with Ruco Chan; Shown in TVB Sales Presentation 2014; Garnering a 29-point rating, average in 24-point rating
2014–2015	Tiger Cubs II	Chung Wai-yan	Nominated – TVB Anniversary Award for My Favourite Female Character (Top 5): Pairs up with Joe Ma; Shown in TVB Sales Presentation 2014; weekend series, Garnering a 27-point rating, average in 21-point rating
2015	Limelight Years	Szeto Dik-dik	Nominated – TVB Anniversary Award for My Favourite Female Character (Top 5); Won — Mainland China's Favourite TVB Actress; Won — ONCC Online Voting for Non-official TV Queen: Pairs up with Alex Fong; Shown in TVB Sales Presentation 2015; Garnering a 31-point rating, average in 24-point rating
2016	Brother's Keeper II	Cheuk Ching (Rachel)	Guest Star; Pairs up with Ruco Chan
2016	K9 Cop	Dr. Ma Chi-ho	Pairs up with Bosco Wong; Shown in TVB Sales Presentation 2016; Garnering a 31-point rating, average in 26-point rating, no.6 rating in 2016
2018	Another Era	Cheng Sze-yu (Janice)	Guest Star; Pairs up with Frankie Lam; Shown in TVB Sales Presentation 2018; Garnering a 23-point rating, average in 22-point rating
2021	Kids' Lives Matter	Dr. Cheung Yee-sum (Eman)	Won — TVB Anniversary Award for Favourite TVB Actress in Malaysia; Nominated — TVB Anniversary Award for Best Actress (Top 5); Nominated — TVB Anniversary Award for Most Popular Female Character (Top 5); Nominated — TVB Anniversary Award for Most Popular Onscreen Partnership (Top 5, with Kevin Cheng); Nominated — People's Choice Television Award for Best Actress (Top 2); Nominated — People's Choice Television Award for Best TV Drama Partnership (Top 10, with Kevin Cheng); Nominated — People's Choice Television Award for Best TV Drama Partnership (Top 10, with Kevin Cheng and Kenneth Ma): Pairs up with Kevin Cheng; Shown in TVB Sales Presentation 2021; Garnering a 23-point rating, average in 19-point rating

==== TVB sales presentation ====
- The following series only appeared in TVB Sales Presentation or Chung not starred in final piece

Year	Title	Role
2005	Revolving Doors of Vengeance 《酒店風雲》	Pairs up with Ron Ng
2011	Ancient Mahjong 《麻雀東南飛》	Pairs up with Kenneth Ma

=== Films ===
Year	Title	Role	Awards
2007	Love Is Not All Around 《十分愛》	Ching-ching 晴 晴	Nominated – Hong Kong Film Awards Best New Performer Nomination; Won – Hong Kong Film Directors Awards for New Actor - Silver: Pairs up with Sammy Leung
2008	Playboy Cops 《花花型警》	Lisa 麗 莎	Pairs up with Shawn Yue
2008	L For Love♥ L For Lies 《我的最愛》	Yan 阿 欣	Pairs up with Alex Fong
2010	72 Tenants of Prosperity 《72家租客》	Ha Nui 哈女	Pairs up with Wong Cho-Lam

=== Dubbing ===
Year	Title	Role	Note
2009	997Love Anywhere 《情情塔塔》#10	Siu-Chuen 小 津	Radio
2011	MYFMHello, Thanks! 《你好，謝謝！》#5	Kimchi	Radio
2013	Mr. Go 《超級巨猩3D》	Chiu Mei-mei 趙薇薇	Film

=== Variety shows ===
Year	Title	Channel	Role
2004	Miss Chinese International Pageant 2004	TVB	Contestant
2005	金雞報喜迎新春	TVB	Host
2007	打吡體育快訊	TVB	Host
2008	Canada Talentvision	Canada Talentvision	Guest
2009	Canada Talentvision	Canada Talentvision	Guest
2009	One from the Heart	TVB	Host
2013	MOOV 音樂導賞團	MOOV	Guest
2013	Miss Hong Kong 2013	TVB	Mentor
2013	Office of Practical Jokes #3	TVB	Guest

=== Music video appearances ===
Year	Title	Artist	Notes
2004	"If Only You Love Me"	Ronald Cheng	
2004	"Split-flow"	Jordan Chan	
2004	"The Second Theater"	Ray Chan	
2004	"Love Notice"	Double R	
2004	"Close the Door"	Hacken Lee	
2005	"Don't Blame on Her"	Ron Ng	
2006	"Swear"	Linda Chung	
2007	"Finding Love in Your Memory"	Raymond Lam	
2007	"Chance in Barren Land"	Raymond Lam	
2007	"Animal Yokochō"	Linda Chung	
2008	"The Story of Saiunkoku"	Linda Chung	
2008	"Dinner for One"	Linda Chung	
2008	"World for Two"	Linda Chung	
2008	"I Don't Know You"	Linda Chung	
2008	"Matchstick Heaven"	Linda Chung	
2008	"I'm Actually Unhappy"	Linda Chung	
2008	"You Won't Understand my Heart" (Mandarin)	Linda Chung	
2008	"I am Unhappy" (Mandarin)	Linda Chung	
2009	"Love Breaks a Heart"	Linda Chung, Philip Wei	
2009	"Thinking of You Day and Night"	Linda Chung	
2009	"Fighting in the Light and Shadows"	Linda Chung	
2009	"Sign"	Linda Chung	
2009	"One Day"	Linda Chung	
2009	"Thinking of you Day and Night" (Mandarin)	Linda Chung	
2009	"One Day" (Mandarin)	Linda Chung	
2010	"Life and Death for Love"	Linda Chung	
2010	"I Can Afford to Love"	Linda Chung, Stephanie Cheng	
2011	"If You Want Me"	Linda Chung	
2011	"I'll Be Waiting for You"	Linda Chung	
2011	"Call You When I'm Not Busy"	Linda Chung	
2012	"Recording Confession of Pain"	Linda Chung, Ron Ng	
2012	"The Story Happily Ever After"	Linda Chung	
2012	"Vaccine"	Linda Chung	
2012	"You Are My Other Half"	Linda Chung	
2012	"Difference"	Linda Chung	
2014	"Big Love"	Linda Chung	
2015	"Regardless of Costs"	Linda Chung	
2015	"The Heart will Never Change"	Linda Chung	
2019	"To Be Your Dawn"	Linda Chung	
2019	"Mommy I Love You So"	Linda Chung	
2021	"Cherish Yourselves"	Linda Chung	

== Discography ==
=== Albums ===
==== Studio albums ====
Year	Album title	Album information
2008	Dinner for One, World for Two: 一人晚餐二人世界	Release date: 20 August 2008: Label: Star Entertainment Debut Album
2008	Dinner for One, World for Two: Reloaded; 一人晚餐二人世界	Release date: 21 October 2008: Label: Star Entertainment; Second Version
2009	My Love Story	Release date: 12 November 2009; Label: Star Entertainment
2010	My Love Story Happy Ending Edition	Release date: 5 February 2010; Label: Star Entertainment; Second Version
2012	Love Love Love	Release date: 13 November 2012; Label: Star Shine International; 4th personal album released

==== Compilation albums ====
Year	Album title	Album information
2011	My Private Selection	Release date: 25 March 2011: Label: Star Entertainment; featuring older songs in previous albums, as well as newly released songs
2016	Under the Stars	Release date: 12 April 2016; Label: The Voice Entertainment Group Limited; Compilation album featuring older songs in previous albums, as well as newly released songs

==== Split albums ====
Year	Album title	Album information
2006	Lady in Red (TVB) Album 金牌女兒紅	Release date: May 2006; Label: Gold Label; Various Artists; Legends of Demigods theme-song. – "Swear" (發誓)
2007	歌影傳情	Release date: 30 May 2007; Label: TVB Music Limited; Various Artists; Heart of Greed sub-theme – "Appreciated" (心領) -Linda Chung & Raymond Lam
2007	Love TV 情歌精選	Release date: 21 August 2008; Label: TVB Music Limited; Various Artists; Best Bet theme-song – (心心相印); A Journey Called Life theme-song – "Small Story" (小故事) -Linda Chung & Steven Ma
2009	Love TV 情歌精選 2	Release date: 30 November 2009; Label: TVB Music Limited; Various Artists; The Gem of Life sub-theme "無情有愛"
2018	NIL	Release date : NIL; Label: The Voice Entertainment Group Limited; Heart and Greed sub-theme – "I Promise"- Linda Chung

=== Singles ===
==== Charted singles ====
Year	Title	Peak positions				Album
Year	Title	CRHK Ultimate 903	RTHK Chinese Pop Chart	Metro Radio Pop Chart 997	JSG Billboard	Album
2008	"World for Two"	13	10	4	—	Dinner for One, World for Two
2008	"I'm actually unhappy"	×	—	—	1	Dinner for One, World for Two
2008	"Matchstick Heaven"	—	—	6	—	Dinner for One, World for Two
2009	"Love breaks a heart"	—	—	3	—	My Love Story (Linda Chung album)
2009	"Thinking of you day and night"	—	7	2	1	My Love Story (Linda Chung album)
2009	"Fighting in the light and shadows"	—	11	3	2	My Love Story (Linda Chung album)
2010	"I can afford to love"	—	3	3	1	My Private Selection
2011	"If You Want Me"	15	10	2	2	My Private Selection
2011	"Call you when I'm not busy"	—	15	4	3	My Private Selection
2012	"Recording confession of Pain"	×	×	×	—	
2012	"The story happily ever after"	×	×	×	—	
2012	"Vaccine"	—	—	2	1	Love Love Love
2012	"You are my other half"	—	1	1	1	Love Love Love
2013	"Loved Song"	—	8	2	—	Love Love Love
2013	"Bursting with happiness"	19	11	—	—	
2013	"Love Love Love"	×	×	×	—	Love Love Love
2014	"Cry on piano"	—	—	2	2	Under The Stars
2014	"We Are The Only One"	×	×	×	1	
2014	"Big Love"	—	—	4	4	Under The Stars
2015	"Regardless of costs"	—	—	2	2	Under The Stars
2015	"The heart will never change"	—	—	—	1	Under The Stars
2016	"I Got Married"	—	—	—	4	
2019	"To Be Your Dawn"	—	—	—	—	

==== TV & animated singles ====
Year	Title	Drama / Animation	Album	Notes
2006	"Swear"	Legend of the Demigods	Dinner for One, World for Two, 金牌女兒紅	
2007	"To Have the Same Thoughts"	Best Bet	Love TV 情歌精選	
2007	"Appreciate your kindness"	Heart of Greed	歌影傳情	Raymond Lam
2007	Animal Yokochō	Animal Yokochō		
2008	"Little Story"	A Journey Called Life	Love TV 情歌精選	Steven Ma
2008	"No affection but have love"	The Gem of Life	Love TV 情歌精選 2	
2008	"The Story of Saiunkoku"	The Story of Saiunkoku	Dinner for One, World for Two	
2009	"A Watchdog's Tale"	A Watchdog's Tale		Steven Ma
2012	"Recording confession of Pain"	L'Escargot		Ron Ng
2012	"The story happily ever after"	Witness Insecurity	Love Love Love	
2012	"Loved Song"	Missing You	Love Love Love	
2013	"Between alternating"	Moon Embracing the Sun	The Butterfly Lovers	Hubert Wu
2014	"Cry on piano"	A Time of Love	TV Love Songs Forever	
2014	"Big Love"	All That Is Bitter Is Sweet	Under The Stars	
2015	"Regardless of costs"	The Empress of China	TV Love Songs Forever	
2015	"The heart will never change"	Captain Of Destiny	Under the Stars	
2015	"I'm not good"	With or Without You	Under the Stars	
2016	"You know me"	K9 Cop	Under the Stars	
2016	"I can't remember"	Inspector Gourmet	Under the Stars	
2017	" I Promise"	Heart and Greed 3		
2021	"Cherish Yourselves"	Kids' Lives Matter		
TBR		Ne Zha and Yang Jian		

==== Compositions ====
Title	Year	Album	Singer	Notes
"Rollercoaster"	2008	Dinner for One, World for Two	Linda Chung	Song Writing
"With or without her"	2008	Dinner for One, World for Two	Linda Chung	Song Writing
"Thinking of you day and night"	2009	My Love Story	Linda Chung	Song Writing
"One Day"	2009	My Love Story	Linda Chung	Song Writing
"Life and Death for Love"	2009	My Love Story	Linda Chung	Song Writing
"One Day" (Mandarin)	2009	My Love Story	Linda Chung	Song Writing
"Thinking of you Day and Night" (Mandarin)	2009	My Love Story	Linda Chung	Song Writing
"Call you when I'm not busy"	2010	My Private Selection	Linda Chung	Song Writing
"Friendship is just that simple" (Mandarin)	2012	Love Love Love	Linda Chung	Song Writing, Lyrics Writing
"Afterwards"	2013	The Butterfly Lovers	Hubert Wu	Song Writing
"I Got Married"	2013		Linda Chung	Song Writing
"Big Love"	2014		Linda Chung	Song Writing
"To Be Your Dawn"	2017		Linda Chung	Song Writing, Lyrics Writing
"Cherish Yourselves"	2021		Linda Chung	Song Writing

==== Covers ====
Title	Year	Album / Event	Original Singer	Notes
"Wish"	2004	TVB8	Sandy Lam	
"A Big Day"	2006	奧海城全城狂歡邁向2007	Kelly Chen	with Leanne Li, Joel Chan, Vivien Yeo, Suki Chui, Vincent Wong
"knickknack"	2006	奧海城全城狂歡邁向2007	Cass Phang	with Leanne Li, Joel Chan, Vivien Yeo, Suki Chui, Vincent Wong
"For Your Heart Only"	2006	奧海城全城狂歡邁向2007	Leslie Cheung	with Leanne Li, Joel Chan, Vivien Yeo, Suki Chui, Vincent Wong
"Comrades: Almost a Love Story"	2006	奧海城全城狂歡邁向2007	Teresa Teng	with Leanne Li, Joel Chan, Vivien Yeo, Suki Chui, Vincent Wong
"Distinct Lover"	2007	STARHUB TVB ROADSHOW 2007	Shirley Kwan	
"Vincent"	2007	東張西望 - 溏心之夜	Don Mclean	with Raymond Lam
"Greatest Love of All"	2007		Whitney Houston	with Bernice Liu
"Unknown"	2007		Joey Yung	with Bernice Liu
"Red Sun"	2008	TVB慈善晚會-雪中送暖	Hacken Lee	with Chilam Cheung, Raymond Lam, Bosco Wong
"Strong"	2008	TVB慈善晚會-雪中送暖	Aaron Kwok	with Chilam Cheung, Raymond Lam, Bosco Wong
"Endless Love"	2008	勁歌金曲	Lionel Richie, Diana Ross	with Ken Hung
"Hero"	2008	飛越驕陽夏日情 - 多倫多錦繡中華 concert	Mariah Carey	with Bernice Liu, Raymond Lam
"Luckily than him"	2008	飛越驕陽夏日情 - 多倫多錦繡中華 concert	Faye Wong	with Bernice Liu, Raymond Lam
"Distinct Lover"	2008	家好月圓Christmas Spectacular Live In Concert 2008	Shirley Kwan	with Louise Lee, Ha Yu, Raymond Lam
"False Love"	2008	家好月圓Christmas Spectacular Live In Concert 2008	Sandy Lam	with Louise Lee, Ha Yu, Raymond Lam
"I need you every minute"	2008	家好月圓Christmas Spectacular Live In Concert 2008	George Lam	with Louise Lee, Ha Yu, Raymond Lam
"Dinner for One"	2008	Dinner for One, World for Two	Ocean Ou	
"World for Two"	2008	Dinner for One, World for Two	まきののぶひろ	
"Silent Romance"	2008	Dinner for One, World for Two	Ariel Lin	
"Matchstick Heaven"	2008	Dinner for One, World for Two	Panda Hung	
"Saiunkoku Monogatari"	2008	Dinner for One, World for Two	Ayaka Hirahara	
"Distinct Lover"	2009	The Miss Chinatown USA 2009 Pageant	Shirley Kwan	
"Unknown"	2009	The Miss Chinatown USA 2009 Pageant	Joey Yung	
"Hero"	2009	The Miss Chinatown USA 2009 Pageant	Mariah Carey	
"Blossom of love in Genting"	2009	花好月圓雲頂之夜 Blossom of Love in Genting		with Bosco Wong
"Fly Me To The Moon"	2009	My Love Story	Bart Howard	
"Love breaks a heart"	2009	My Love Story	Liu Keng-Hung, eVonne Hsu	
"Cha Cha Cha"	2009	My Love Story	Roxanne Seeman, Kine Ludvigsen, Olav Fossheim	
"I heard you love me"	2009	My Love Story	Sandy Lam	
"Dream to awakening"	2010	星在金沙6週年	Sarah Chen	
"What Logic is This?"	2010	紅黑皇佈道會	Jade Kwan	
"I Still Believe"	2010	Neway Music Live 2010 @ Hot Stars Party Concert	Mariah Carey	
"Dream to awakening"	2010	2010 Thanksgiving 感恩節峯情再現 Come to me Concert	Sarah Chen	with Raymond Lam
"I Still Believe"	2010	2010 Thanksgiving 感恩節峯情再現 Come to me Concert	Mariah Carey	with Raymond Lam
"Ask Me"	2010	2010 Thanksgiving 感恩節峯情再現 Come to me Concert	Grace Chan	with Raymond Lam
"Nobody"	2010	2010 Thanksgiving 感恩節峯情再現 Come to me Concert	Wonder Girls	with Raymond Lam
"Fall in love"	2010	2010 Thanksgiving 感恩節峯情再現 Come to me Concert	Sally Yeh, Sammi Cheng	with Raymond Lam
"Walk gracefully once"	2010	2010 Thanksgiving 感恩節峯情再現 Come to me Concert	Sally Yeh	with Raymond Lam
"I am gonna marry you"	2010	2010 Thanksgiving 感恩節峯情再現 Come to me Concert	Wakin Chau	with Raymond Lam
"God prepared already"	2010	2010 Thanksgiving 感恩節峯情再現 Come to me Concert	Sammi Cheng	with Raymond Lam
"In Love With You"	2010	2010 Thanksgiving 感恩節峯情再現 Come to me Concert	Backstreet Boys	with Raymond Lam
"I can afford to love"	2010	My Private Selection	Cindy Yen, Jay Chou	
"If You Want Me"	2010	My Private Selection	Marketa Irglova	
"I'll be waiting for you"	2010	My Private Selection	김유경	
"Ask Me"	2011	勁歌金曲	Grace Chan	
"Forgive me for being myself"	2012	Love Love Love	The Grasshopper	
"Differences"	2012	Love Love Love	22nd CASH canton pop creation contest	
"Death Symptoms"	2012	Love Love Love	Colleen Lau	
"The Moon Represents My Heart" (Mandarin)	2012	Love Love Love	Teresa Teng	
"My love die without a sickness"	2016	Under the Stars	Girls' Generation	

==== Commercial singles ====
Year	Title	Brand / Event	Other Artist	Notes
2008	"恭喜恭喜．歡樂年年"	TVB Happy New Year Song	TVB Artist Covered	
2008	"光輝的印記"	the Games of the XXIX Olympiad	Raymond Lam, Bernice Liu, Edwin Siu	
2008	"God Save the Earth"	暖流送四川慈善演唱會	HK Artists	
2009	"雪中送暖"	抗擊雪災行動	100 HK Artists	
2009	"豪華盛世"	TVB Happy New Year Song	Leo Ku, Miriam Yeung, Kay Tse, William Chan, Bosco Wong, Det Dik, Gem Tang, Fiona Fung, FAMA, Hotcha	
2010	"歡樂年年"	72 Tenants of Prosperity	TVB Artists	
2013	"喜氣洋洋"	TVB Happy New Year Song	Singers of Stars Shine	
2014	"We Are the Only One"	2014 FIFA World Cup Brasil	TVB Artists	

== Tours ==
- Linda Chung Love Love Love Concert 2013 in Hong Kong
- Linda Chung Love Concert 2014 in Malaysia

== Bibliography ==
- Photo-book - happiness (幸·福) in 2013

== Commercial advertisements ==
Year	Title	Notes
2004	Bausch & Lomb	Print Ads
2004	Stage Beautie	Print Ads
2004	i-Maroon	Print Ads
2004	Johnson ACUVUE Advance	Print Ads
2004	Senniyo Beauty	Print Ads
2004	SmarTone	Print Ads
2004	Sau San Tong	TVC
2004	French Beauty	Print Ads
2004	Toshiba	Print Ads
2005	Clarins	Print Ads
2005	Violino	Print Ads
2005	Swedding	Print Ads
2005	Toshiba	Print Ads
2005	Yumei	Print Ads
2006	Marathon Sports	Print Ads
2006	Yumei	Print Ads
2007	Stayfree	TVC
2007	Yumei	Print Ads
2008	Reductil	Print Ads
2008	Bio-Essence	TVC, Print Ads
2008	Vita Green	Print Ads
2008	Colgate-Palmolive	Print Ads
2009	Reductil	Print Ads
2009	Bio-Essence	TVC, Print Ads
2010	Bio-Essence	TVC, Print Ads
2010	Max Factor	Print Ads
2010	Zenses	TVC, Print Ads
2010	She & Co	Print Ads
2011	Chloe	Print Ads
2011	Slim Beauty	Print Ads
2011	Bio-Essence	TVC, Print Ads
2011	Zenses	TVC, Print Ads
2012	Dettol	TVC, Print Ads
2012	Slim Beauty	Print Ads
2012	Bio-Essence	TVC, Print Ads
2012	Zenses	TVC, Print Ads
2012	Ame Group Limited	Print Ads
2013	Slim Beauty	Print Ads
2013	Bio-Essence	TVC, Print Ads
2013	Ame Group Limited	Print Ads
2014	Bio-Essence	TVC, Print Ads
2014	Ame Group Limited	Print Ads
2015	Bio-Essence	TVC, Print Ads
2015	New Beauty	Print Ads
2016	Q Chicken	Print Ads
2016	Bio-Essence	TVC, Print Ads
2016	New Beauty	Print Ads
2017	Qchicken	Print Ads
2017	Bio-Essence	TVC, Print Ads
2017	New Beauty	Print Ads
2017	Hong Kong Disneyland	Digital Ads, TVC
2018	Qchicken	Print Ads
2018	Bio-Essence	TVC, Print Ads
2018	New Beauty	TVC, Print Ads
2018	Huggies	TVC, Print Ads
2018	Hong Kong Disneyland	Digital Ads, TVC
2019	Bio-Essence	TVC, Print Ads
2019	New Beauty	Print Ads
2019	Mead Johnson	TVC, Print Ads
2020	Mead Johnson	TVC, Print Ads
2020	Sea Horse	TVC, Print Ads
2021	Aigle	Digital Ads
2021	Mentholatum	TVC, Print Ads
2021	Ocean Park	Digital Ads
2021	Disneyland	Digital Ads
2022	50 Megumi	Digital Ads, TVC, Print Ads
2022	Moschino	Digital Ads
2022	Bluebell	Digital Ads
2022	Adrien Gagnon	Digital Ads, TVC, Print Ads
2022	Charles & Keith	Digital Ads
2022	Rohto	Digital Ads, TVC, Print Ads
2022	Tea Château	Digital Ads, Print Ads

=== TVB official advertisements ===
Year	Title	Notes
2004	TVB Pearl Socrates in Love Ad	TVC
2005	MaBelle Ad	TVC
2005	Residence Bel-Air Ad	TVC
2005	Diamond Trading Company (DTC) Forevermark Ad	TVC
2006	TVB HD Jade Ad	TVC
2007	TVB Valentine's Day Ad	TVC: Pairs up with Bosco Wong
2009	TVB Happy New Year Ad	TVC: Pairs up with Raymond Lam
2010	TVB Happy New Year Ad	TVC: Pairs up with Bosco Wong
2011	TVB Love Season Ad (17 February)	TVC
2012	TVB the Games of the XXX Olympiad Ad	TVC
2012	Neway Ad	TVC
2012	DISH Network Ad	TVC

== Awards ==
List of Linda Chung's music & acting awards

=== Major music awards statistics ===
Year	USCA	RTHK	MRHMA	JSG
2008	–	1	2	1
2009	–	–	2	2
2010	–	–	–	1
2011	–	–	–	–
2012	–	–	2	–
2013	–	–	1	1

=== 2021 ===
- TVB Anniversary Awards 2021 - Favourite TVB Actress in Malaysia (Kids' Lives Matter)

=== 2015 ===
- Starhub TVB Awards 2015 – My Favourite TVB Female TV Character (Tiger Cubs II)
- Starhub TVB Awards 2015 – Bottomslim The Perfect Figure Award

=== 2014 ===
- Starhub TVB Awards 2014 – My Favourite TVB Female TV Character (All That Is Bitter Is Sweet)
- Starhub TVB Awards 2014 – Red Carpet Star

=== 2013 ===
- Astro TVB Star Awards 2013 – My Favourite TVB Actress in a Leading Role (Brother's Keeper)
- Starhub TVB Awards 2013 – My Favourite TVB Female TV Character (Witness Insecurity)
- Starhub TVB Awards 2013 – Everlasting Glow Award
- Starhub TVB Awards 2013 – Red Carpet Star

=== 2012 ===
- My AOD Favourite Award – Top 15 Character Ranked No. 3
- Starhub TVB Award 2012 – Perfect Smile Award.
- Starhub TVB Award 2012 – My Favorite TVB Onscreen Couple (Yes Sir, Sorry Sir)
- Starhub TVB Award 2012 – My Favorite TVB Female Character (L'Escargot)
- Vietnam DMA Presentation Ceremony 2011 – Most Popular Female Actress (Hong Kong)
- Next TV Awards 2012 – Ranked No. 5 Song Award
- Next TV Awards 2012 – Toshiba Award

=== 2011 ===
- Ming Pao Anniversary Awards 2011 – My Most Supportive Performance (Yes Sir, Sorry Sir)
- My AOD Malaysia My Favourite TVB Series Presentation 2011 – Top 10 My Favourite Character
- Next TV Awards 2011 – Ranked No. 6 Song Award
- JSG First Round Music Awards 2011 – Song Award (If You Want Me)
- JSG Music Awards 2010 – Best Duet – Bronze (with Stephanie Cheng)

=== 2010 ===
- My AOD Malaysia My Favourite TVB Series Presentation 2010 – My Favourite Character
- JSG First Round Music Awards 2010 – Best Duet Song Award (with Stephanie Cheng)
- JSG First Round Music Awards 2010 – Song Award
- Next TV Awards 2010 – Polo Santa Roberta Award
- Next TV Awards 2010 – Ranked No. 6 Song Award
- (雪碧榜) Award Ceremony – Most Improved Singer Award
- Sina Music Awards – Top 20 Song (Missing You Day & Night)
- JSG Music Awards 2009 – Best Duet Bronze Award (with Phillip Wei)
- JSG Music Awards 2009 – Best Performance Award – Bronze Song Award

=== 2009 ===
- Metro Radio Hits 2009 Awards – Best Metro Radio Hits Best Second Year Singer (Female)
- Metro Radio Hits 2009 Awards – Best Karaoke Song (Missing You Day & Night)
- JSG third round Music Awards – song award (Missing you day and night)
- Yes! Idol Award Presentation 2009 – Karaoke Female Idol
- Yes! Idol Award Presentation 2009 – 2009 Yes Idol
- Next TV Awards 2009 – Ranked No. 6 Song Award
- IFPI Hong Kong CD Sales Presentation 2008 – Most Sales Hong Kong Female newcomer
- Astro Awards 2008 – My Favorite Character 2008 – Sheung Joy Sum
- Astro Awards 2008 – Favorite Onscreen Couple 2008 (with Raymond Lam)
- RTHK Top 10 Gold Songs Awards – Best Female Newcomer Outstanding Award
- Sina Music Awards 2008 – My Favourite Female Newcomer 2008 – Gold
- (雪碧榜) Award Ceremony 2008 – Newcomer Awards 2008
- JSG Music Awards 2008 – Best Female Newcomer 2008 – Silver

=== 2008 ===
- Metro Radio Hits Music Award Presentation 2008 – Metro Radio Hits King of New Singers Award 2008 – (Female) Linda Chung
- Yes! Idol Award Presentation 2008 – Most Rise TV Idol
- Yes! Idol Award Presentation 2008 – King of New Singers Award 2008 – (Female)
- JSG Third Round Music Awards 2008 – Song Award
- Metro Radio Newcomer Presentation 2008 – Best Live Female Performer 2008
- TVB8 Music Awards 2008 – Best Newcomer Silver Award 2008
- Yahoo! Buzz Awards 2008 – Most Rise in Searches Newcomer Artist 2008
- Metro Radio Children's Song Presentation 2008 – Song of the Year
- Metro Radio Children' Song Presentation 2008 – Top 10 Song
- TVB Children's Song Presentation 2008 – Golden Song Award
- TVB Children's Song Presentation 2008 – Top 10 Song
- Hong Kong Film Directors' Society – Silver Song Award
- 27th Hong Kong Film Awards – Nomination of Best New Performer
- Next TV Awards 2008 – Ranked No. 9 Song Award

=== 2007 ===
- Metro Radio Children's Song Presentation 2007 – Top 10 Song
- TVB Children's Song Presentation 2007 – Top 10 Song
- Next TV Awards 2007 – Healthiest Star
- Yahoo! Buzz Awards 2007 – Most Rise in Searches TV Artist 2007
- Next TV Awards 2007 – mYoga Female Artist Award

=== 2006 ===
- TVB Anniversary Awards 2006 – Most Improved Female Actress Award 2006
- Next TV Awards 2006 – Yumei Award

=== 2005 ===
- Magazine of Week 8 – Most Perfect Smile

=== 2004 ===
- Miss Chinese International 2004 – Champion

=== 2003 ===
- Miss Chinese Vancouver 2003 – Champion
- Miss Chinese Vancouver 2003 – Miss Photogenic
- Miss Chinese Vancouver 2003 – Miss Talent
- Miss Chinese Vancouver 2003 – Miss Snow Beauty

=== 2002 ===
- Miss Crystal Cover Girl 2002 – Champion
- Miss Crystal Cover Girl 2002 – Best Swimsuit Performance

Awards and achievements
Preceded by Annie Wang	Miss Chinese Vancouver; 2003	Succeeded by Leanne Li
Preceded by Annie Wang	Miss Chinese Vancouver: Miss Photogenic; 2003	Succeeded by Leanne Li
Preceded by Rachel Tan	Miss Chinese International; 2004	Succeeded by Leanne Li
Preceded by Niki Chow for The Gentle Crackdown	TVB Anniversary Awards: Most Improved Actress; 2006 for Always Ready; The Bitter Bitten; Forensic Heroes	Succeeded by Kate Tsui for On The First Beat; Steps
Preceded by Charmaine Sheh for Can't Buy Me Love	Ming Pao Anniversary Awards: My Most Supportive Performance; 2011 for Yes Sir, Sorry Sir	Succeeded by TBA
