= Casper Chan =

Hong Kong actress

- Born: Chén Kǎi Yí (陳凱怡); 11 May 1982 (age 43); Hong Kong
- Occupation(s): Actress, Model
- Years active: 2001–present

Chinese name
- Traditional Chinese: 陳思齊
- Simplified Chinese: 陈思齐
Transcriptions
Standard Mandarin
- Hanyu Pinyin: Chén Sī Qí

Casper Chan is a Hong Kong actress. Notable roles include a hotel employee in 7 Days in Life, and Legend of the Demigods as a magistrates daughter.

== Television ==
- Beyond the Rainbow (2015)
- Sexpedia (2015)
- The Menu (2015)
- Incredible Mama (2015)
- The Election (HKTV, 2014)
- No Good Either Way (TVB, 2012)
- Super Snoops (TVB, 2011)
- River of Wine (TVB, 2011)
- Yes, Sir. Sorry, Sir! (TVB, 2011)
- My Sister of Eternal Flower (TVB, 2011)
- The Mysteries of Love (TVB, 2010)
- 7 Days in Life (TVB, 2010)
- Can't Buy Me Love (TVB, 2010)
- Just Love II (TVB, 2009)
- E.U. (TVB, 2009)
- Sweetness in the Salt (TVB, 2009)
- The Gem of Life (TVB, 2008)
- The Four (TVB, 2008, Ep.03-04 cameo:Siu-tou)
- Legend of the Demigods (TVB, 2008)
- Moonlight Resonance (TVB, 2008, cameo)
- When a Dog Loves a Cat (TVB, 2008)
- On the First Beat (TVB, 2007)
- Devil's Disciples (TVB, 2007)
- War and Destiny (TVB, 2007)
- Best Bet (TVB, 2007)
- The White Flame (TVB, 2007)
- Placebo Cure (TVB, 2006)
- Forensic Heroes (TVB, 2006)
- Into Thin Air (TVB, 2005)
- Wars of In-Laws (TVB, 2005)
- Just Love (TVB, 2005)
- The Academy (TVB, 2005)
- To Love with No Regrets (TVB, 2004)
- Hard Fate (TVB, 2004)
- Triumph in the Skies (TVB, 2003)
- Life Begins at Forty (TVB, 2003)
- Survivor's Law (TVB, 2003)
- Virtues of Harmony II (TVB, 2003, cameo)
- Virtues of Harmony (TVB, 2001, cameo)
