= Charmaine Li =

Hong Kong actress (born 1983)

- Born: January 8, 1983 (age 43); British Hong Kong
- Other names: Li Si-Yan, Charmaine Li Si-Yan, Sze Yan Li
- Occupation: Actress
- Years active: 2004–2014
- Spouse: Ricky Fan (m. 2011)

Chinese name
- Traditional Chinese: 李思欣
Transcriptions
Standard Mandarin
- Hanyu Pinyin: Li Sixin
Yue: Cantonese
- Jyutping: Lei Si-jan
- Website: Official website

Charmaine Li (born January 8, 1983) is an actress, model, business owner, and spokesperson in the Hong Kong entertainment industry. She had a decade-long career in TVB. Li now focuses on business development and movies.

== Early life and education ==
On 8 January 1983, Li was born in British Hong Kong. Li graduated from Belilios Public School.

In 2004, Li graduated from School of Drama at The Hong Kong Academy of Performing Arts in Hong Kong.

== Career ==
From 2004 to 2014, Li worked under Television Broadcasts Limited. After 2014, Li stopped acting to focus on business development.

Li is a business woman. Li and her husband Ricky Fan co-invested in an online diamond business. Li and her husband also have business investments in a restaurant, bowling alley, and film production. Although invested in several business projects, she still takes the time to film movies.

== Personal life ==
On 8 December 2011, Li married Ricky Fan, an actor and DJ, in Guam. On 15 January 2012, they held their wedding banquet in Hong Kong.

== Filmography ==
=== Films ===
| Year | Title | Role | Notes/Ref. |
|---|---|---|---|
| 2012 | Lives in Flames | | |
| 2017 | Our Days in 6E | | |
| 2018 | The Hit | | |
| 2018 | The Choice | | |

=== Television ===
| Year | Title | Role | Notes/Ref. |
|---|---|---|---|
| 2004 | Sunshine Heartbeat | Yip Kiu (Ah Kiu) | Nominated - TVB Anniversary Award for Best Supporting Actress; Nominated - TVB Anniversary Award for Most Improved Female Artiste |
| 2005 | Real Kung Fu | Tse Ping-Yee | Nominated - TVB Anniversary Award for Best Supporting Actress; Nominated - TVB Anniversary Award for Most Improved Female Artiste |
| 2005 | When Rules Turn Loose | Betty | |
| 2006 | Forensic Heroes | Tracy | |
| 2006 | War and Destiny | Ku Chiu-Yee | Nominated - TVB Anniversary Award for Best Supporting Actress; Nominated - TVB Anniversary Award for Most Improved Female Artiste |
| 2006 | Glittering Days | Gam Yin (youth version) | |
| 2007 | The Slicing of the Demon | Fok Sin-kei | |
| 2007 | Men Don't Cry | Fok Tsang-Nei (Jenny) | Nominated - TVB Anniversary Award for Best Supporting Actress; Nominated - TVB Anniversary Award for Most Improved Female Artiste |
| 2008 | The Seventh Day | Wong Wai (Jessie) | |
| 2008 | The Silver Chamber of Sorrows | Sheung Ho Yi | |
| 2008 | Legends of Demigods | Shek Kam-Yin | |
| 2010 | Ghost Writer | Ngai Hung | |
| 2010 | Can't Buy Me Love | Princess Jinhuai | |
| 2011 | A Great Way to Care | Lee Tsz Yan | |
| 2011 | Relic of an Emissary | Tim Yee | |
| 2011 | Curse of the Royal Harem | Concubine Yeung | |
| 2012 | Silver Spoon, Sterling Shackles | Choi Yuet | |
| 2013 | Missing You | Cherry | |
| 2014 | Ghost Dragon of Cold Mountain | Dong Yee | |
