= Love Love Love (Linda Chung album) =

Studio album by Linda Chung
- Released: 13 November 2012
- Genre: Cantopop
- Producer: Stars Shine International

Linda Chung chronology
My Private Selection (2011)	Love Love Love (2012)

Love Love Love is the fourth album by Linda Chung, and was released on 13 November 2012. It contains 11 tracks, of which 3 are Mandarin while the rest are Cantonese. "The Moon Represents My Heart" is a remake of a famous song from the artist Teresa Teng. In an interview, Chung expressed that the album's main theme was the idea of happiness. Whilst at a promotional event for lovelovelove, Linda also stated that she has now saved enough songs to hold a concert.

== Track listing ==
1. 你是我的一半 (You are my other half)
2. 預防針 (Vaccine)
3. Love Love Love
4. 最幸福的事 (The story happily ever after) [Theme song of Witness Insecurity]
5. 原諒我是我 (Forgive me for being myself)
6. 落差 (Differences)
7. 就算沒有明天 (Even without tomorrow)
8. 死症 (Death Symptoms)
9. 月亮代表我的心 (The Moon Represents My Heart)(Mandarin)
10. 友愛是這麽簡單 (Friendship is just that simple)(Mandarin)
11. 你是的我一半 (You are my other half)(Mandarin)

As of 26 November 2012, the album had been certified gold, meaning that it had sold over 35,000 copies.

== Second version ==
A second version of the album was released after a good reaction from the market. A remix and a new song was added in, while the song "月亮代表我的心 (The Moon Represents My Heart)" was taken out.

1. 最幸福的事(劇場版) (The story happily ever after theatre version ft. Bosco Wong)
2. 幸福歌 (Loved Song) [Theme song of Missing You]
