= My Private Selection =

Greatest hits album by Linda Chung
- Released: 25 March 2011
- Genre: Cantopop
- Producer: Star Entertainment Limited

Linda Chung chronology
My Love Story (2009)	My Private Selection (2011)	Love Love Love (2012)

My Private Selection is the third album by Linda Chung, and was released on 25 March 2011. It contains 18 tracks, of which 5 are new, while the others are a compilation from the previous albums. Notable is the 5th song, "I can afford to love", which was originally a duet with Stephanie Cheng, now a solo. The duet itself was originally sung by Jay Chou and Cindy Yen in Mandarin.

== Track listing ==
1. If You Want Me (new)
2. 得閒找你 (Call you when I'm not busy) (new)
3. 囉唆 (Annoying) (new)
4. I'll be Waiting for You (new)
5. 愛得起 (I can afford to love) (new)
6. 一人晚餐 (Dinner for One)
7. 二人世界 (World for Two)
8. 我不懂你 (I don't know you)
9. 火柴天堂 (Matchstick Heaven)
10. 其實我不快樂 (I'm actually unhappy)
11. 有沒有她 (With or without her)
12. 浪漫無聲 (Silent Romance)
13. 日夜想你 (Thinking of you day and night)
14. 明爭暗鬥 (Fighting in the light and shadows)
15. 有一天 (One Day)
16. 白羊座的情歌 (Aries's Love song)
17. 生死也為愛 (Life and Death for Love)
18. 戀愛令人心痛 (Love breaks a heart)
