= A Time of Love =

Hong Kong television series

- Logo
- 愛情來的時候
- Genre: Modern romance
- Created by: Hong Kong Television Broadcasts Limited
- Starring: Ep.1 Malaysia: Kate Tsui 徐子珊, James Wen 温昇豪, Chris Wang 宥勝; Ep.2 Singapore: Charmaine Sheh 佘詩曼, Kenneth Ma 馬國明; Ep.3 Korea: Linda Chung 鍾嘉欣, Yeon Jung-hoon 延政勳 (연정훈); Ep.4 Japan: Wong Cho Lam 王祖藍, Aaron Yan 炎亞綸, Naomi Watanabe 渡邊直美 (渡辺直美), Ben Wong 黃智賢
- Opening theme: Ep.1 Malaysia: Not to Forget Love (愛莫忘) by Joyce Cheng; Ep.2 Singapore: Pause (休止符) by Jinny Ng; Ep.3 Korea: Piano Cry (鋼琴哭) by Linda Chung
- Country of origin: Hong Kong
- Original languages: Cantonese, Mandarin, Korean, English, Japanese
- No. of episodes: 4

Production
- Production locations: Malaysia, Singapore, Korea, Japan
- Running time: 45 minutes
- Production company: TVB

Original release
- Network: TVB Jade; HD Jade
- Release: January 26 – February 16, 2014

A Time of Love
- Traditional Chinese: 愛情來的時候
- Simplified Chinese: 爱情来的时候
Transcriptions
Standard Mandarin
- Hanyu Pinyin: Ài qíng lái de shí hou
Yue: Cantonese
- Jyutping: oi3 cing4 lei4 dik1 si4 hau6

A Time of Love (Chinese: 愛情來的時候; Jyutping: Ngoi Ching Lai Dik Si Hau) is a 2014 Hong Kong micro film produced by TVB. The series is made up of four different stories varying from sad, urban, happy and cartoon theme in different countries. Kate Tsui and Taiwanese actors James Wen and Chris Wang will be entangled in a love triangle in the sad theme in Taiwan. Charmaine Sheh will be portraying Kenneth Ma's boss in the urban theme in Singapore. The happy theme will be featuring Linda Chung and South Korean actor Yeon Jung-hoon as a pair in South Korea. In the last cartoon theme Wong Cho-lam will be playing various characters that help a couple played by Taiwanese actor singer Aaron Yan and Japanese comedian Naomi Watanabe get together in Japan.

== Cast and synopsis ==
=== Sad (Malaysia) ===
- Theme Song: Unforgettable (愛莫忘) by Joyce Cheng
- Starring:
  - Kate Tsui 徐子珊 as Ah San/Kelly 珊
  - James Wen 温昇豪 as Lee Tsz Hou 李子豪
  - Chris Wang 宥勝 as John (Shing) 勝

Set in Malaysia, the movie begins with Ling Shan (Kate Tsui) suffering from amnesia after going through a vicious car accident. Though she forgets her family and loved ones, the only person Shan remembers is Shing (Chris Wang), who loses mobility in one of his legs while trying to save her. Feeling guilty and developing a deep admiration for Shing, Shan falls deeply in love with Shing and moves in with him. As Shan and Shing prepare for their marriage, Shan meets Ho, who claims to be her former boyfriend. Ho brings her to various places around the city to spark her memory, and Shan begins to feel a sense of familiarity.

=== Urban (Singapore) ===
- Theme Song: Rest Note (休止符) by Jinny Ng
- Starring:
  - Charmaine Sheh 佘詩曼 as Crystal
  - Kenneth Ma 馬國明 as Oscar

The Singapore segment of the film is a modern tale of a career-minded woman, Crystal (Charmaine Sheh) who hires her subordinate Oscar (Kenneth Ma), as her temporary partner so she can use him to trash her ex-boyfriend's wedding. To Crystal's surprise, Oscar ends up falling in love with her.

=== Happy (Korea) ===
- Theme Song: Piano Cry (鋼琴哭) by Linda Chung
- Starring:
  - Linda Chung 鍾嘉欣 as Linda
  - Yeon Jung-hoon 延政勳 (연정훈) as King (Kim Dong-seong) 金東城 (김동성)

The Korean segment tells the story of the professional Korean illustrator King (Yeon Jung-hoon), who also works as a part-time Korean-language teacher for foreigners. Wanting to spend a life with her boyfriend in Korea, flamboyant and spoiled Hong Kong girl Linda (Linda Chung) hires King as her Korean teacher. With their opposite personalities, King initially dislikes Linda, but for the sake of his job, he learns to cope with her. As the days go by, King begins to see a new, more likable side of Linda and slowly begins to fall in love with her. However, he also discovers a terrifying secret about her boyfriend, and he is at odds with himself over it.

=== Cartoon/Comic (Japan) ===
- Starring:
  - Wong Cho Lam 王祖藍 as Various Characters (Narrator, Yoshiko's female assistant, Rude Japanese teen, Wedding photographer)
  - Aaron Yan 炎亞綸 as Chan Dai Tin 陳大天
  - Naomi Watanabe 渡邊直美 (渡辺直美) as Wada Yoshiko 和田美子
  - Ben Wong 黃智賢 as Peter/Yoshiko's uncle 和田八五郎

The Japanese segment of the film is a comedic tale of the narrator (Wong Cho Lam) telling the story of Chan Dai Tin (Aaron Yan) and Wada Yoshiko (Naomi Watanabe). Chan Dai Tin is a 3rd rate bread baker from Taiwan sent by Hong Kong's Cake Kingdom Peter to obtain the 300-year-old family secret "wada ichigo" recipe from Yoshiko. Yoshiko is a plump girl that is the proprietor of the "wada ichigo" (a mochi sweets) business and the only one that knows the secret recipe to "wada ichigo". According to a family rule she must get married before age 30 or else she will lose the "wada ichigo" recipe and family business to her uncle.

== Production ==
On 14 July 2013, it was announced that TVB will be producing a mini drama featuring current top fadans and siusangs as well as stars from other countries. In addition, TVB and Phoenix TV will be investing $65 million HKD in the production of the drama. Initially, Raymond Lam was set to play the leading role in the urban theme but withdrew from the project because of conflicts, his religious views. His role was instead replaced by Kenneth Ma.

== Viewership ratings and reception ==
The first episode (Taiwan theme) received a total of 39 praises for Kate Tsui's excellent performance and the touching story.

Week	Episodes	Date	Average Points	Peaking Points
1	01	January 26, 2014	18	19
2	02	February 2, 2014	20	22
3	03	February 9, 2014	26	28
4	04	February 16, 2014	23	25
