= Best Bet =

- Official poster
- 迎妻接福
- Genre: Comedy
- Screenplay by: Chan Ching-yee; Sin Siu-ling; Fung Yat-chun; Sin Kin-yan; Lau Chi-wah
- Directed by: Dave Fong; Chu Lai-wo; Ng Koon-ching; Wong Kin-fan
- Starring: Michael Tse; Linda Chung; Wayne Lai; Anne Heung
- Opening theme: Mutual Affinity (心心相印) by Linda Chung
- Country of origin: Hong Kong
- Original language: Cantonese
- No. of episodes: 20

Production
- Producer: Lee Tim-shing
- Production location: Hong Kong
- Camera setup: Multi camera
- Running time: 45 minutes (approx.)
- Production company: TVB

Original release
- Network: TVB Jade
- Release: 12 February – 9 March 2007

Best Bet is a 2007 Hong Kong comedy television series produced by TVB and starring Michael Tse, Linda Chung, Wayne Lai and Anne Heung. The series was Tse's first leading television role and aired from 12 February to 9 March 2007 on TVB's operated channel, Jade.

== Synopsis ==
Ho Yee (Michael Tse) is a compulsive gambler who also has luck on his side. On one occasion he gambled for three days straight and collapsed on the streets. Sheila To (Linda Chung) helps him up and soon he falls in love with her. Sheila's father is also a compulsive gambler who borrowed a large sum of money from loan sharks. To help her father out, Sheila was forced to marry Yee in order to repay her father's debt.

Yee's childhood best friend turned enemy, Tsang Tak-shing (Wayne Lai), is always around to compete with Yee. One day, Yee gambles with Tak-shing, causing Yee to lose his whole family fortune. Will he be able to regain his family's trust and wealth and lose his addiction to gambling?

== Cast ==
- Michael Tse as Ho Yee (賀義), the series' protagonist, an heir of a wealthy family who was spoiled by his parents, leading him to become a compulsive gambler and does not engage in a serious profession. Yee always had high streaks of luck, often winning in gambling matches, but despite so, gambling eventually led to his downfall.
- Linda Chung as Sheila To (杜麗瑩), a philanthropist who studied overseas in the west and greatly despises gambling. She marries Yee in order to help her father repay his gambling debts.
- Wayne Lai as Tsang Tak-shing (曾德勝), the series' antagonist, Yee's nemesis who used to be his childhood friend until one time, Tak-shing framed Yee for drooling onto a painting of a beautiful woman during class time, resulting the latter to be punished by their teacher, while in actuality, it was Tak-shing, who drooled at it due to his foot fetishism.
- Anne Heung as Kong Ma-lei (江瑪莉), born Kong Siu-wai (江小惠), Yee's petty young cousin on whom Tak-shing has a crush.
- Wilson Tsui as To Chai-sam (杜濟森), Sheila's father who is also a compulsive gambler.
- Casper Chan as Ho Hei (賀喜), Yee's younger half-sister who is intellectually disabled.
- Kwok Fung as Ho Nin (賀年), Yee and Hei's father who is the owner of a major pawn shop.
- Gordon Liu as Tsang Tai-lik (曾大力), Tak-shing's father and the owner of Hung Fuk Casino.
- Ngo Ka-nin as Tsang Tak-kin (曾德健), Tak-shing's younger brother who is educated and well-mannered.
- Gill Mohindepaul Singh as Kam Po (金寶), a physician.
- Carlo Ng as Pak Fung (白鳳), a restaurateur and a good friend of Yee's.

== Viewership ratings ==
	Week	Episode	Average Points	Peaking Points	References
1	February 12–16, 2007	1 — 5	29	31	
2	February 19–23, 2007	6 — 10	31	33	
3	February 26 - March 2, 2007	11 — 15	32	36	
4	March 5–9, 2007	16 — 20	34	38	

== Awards and nominations ==
- TVB Anniversary Awards (2007)
  - Nominated: Best Drama
