= The Biter Bitten =

- The Biter Bitten poster
- 人生馬戲團
- Genre: Modern Adventure
- Starring: Benny Chan; Shirley Yeung; Michael Tong; Linda Chung; Stephen Au
- Opening theme: "只需與你" by Shirley Yeung
- Country of origin: Hong Kong
- Original language: Cantonese
- No. of episodes: 20

Production
- Running time: 45 minutes (approx.)

Original release
- Network: TVB
- Release: March 20 – April 14, 2006

The Biter Bitten (Chinese: 人生馬戲團) is a TVB modern adventure series broadcast in March 2006.

The story takes place in a circus and shot in Panyu, China.

== Synopsis ==
A treasure is hidden inside a circus.
One step closer to the treasure; one step closer to danger.

This series is about the four close friends and their family looking for a buried treasure from the "Ten Tigers". They go through a lot of clues to lead them to new discoveries which all lead up to the big treasure. Jo Jun-Fung (Benny Chan) is the smart one that loves to solve riddles and answer IQ questions. Cheung Kin-Sing (Michael Tong) is Fung's best friend and both of them just arrived from America after studying.

As the series progresses, their love relationships become entangled causing misunderstandings and difficult times. Sing liked Lo Dan (Linda Chung) at first sight. Joey Chik Ho-Yee (Shirley Yeung) is annoyed with Fung and Sing and they always prank each other, But later she gradually grows a relationship for Fung. But Fung likes Dan and she likes him too, and Sing and Joey try to break them up through hilarious plans which backfire on them instead. They soon start to fall in love with each other. The four strive to get the treasure for historical purposes but little do they know, the deeper they go, the more trouble awaits them.

== Cast ==
Cast	Role	Description
Benny Chan	Ho Chun-Fung (Hill) 何峻峰	Cheung Kin-Sing's best friend. Lo Dan's boyfriend, later husband. Rejected Chik Ho-Yee
Michael Tong	Cheung Kin-Sing 張建星	Ho Chun-Fung's best friend. Liked Lo Dan in the earlier episodes Chik Ho-Yee's boyfriend, later husband.
Shirley Yeung	Chik Ho-Yee (Joey) 席可兒	Archaeology Student; Liked Ho Jun-Fung in the earlier episodes Cheung Kin-Sing's girlfriend, later wife.
Linda Chung	Lo Dan 路丹	Acrobat; Ho Jun-Fung's girlfriend, later wife Rejected Cheung Kin-sin; Gam Lam's adopted sister
Stephen Au	Gam Lam 甘霖	Acrobat Leader; Lo Dan's adopted brother Liked Lo Dan; Falls down abyss in Episode 20; Villain
Wu Fung	Chiu Hok-Man 招學文	Archaeology Professor
Eileen Yeow	Sung Miu-Sze 宋妙思	Acrobat's alternate captain Liked Gum Lam
Sherming Yiu (姚樂怡)	Yin Ka-Bik 言家碧	Acrobat

== Viewership ratings ==
	Week	Episode	Average Points	Peaking Points	References
1	March 20–24, 2006	1 — 5	31	—	
2	March 27–31, 2006	6 — 10	29	—	
3	April 3–7, 2006	11 — 15	29	34	
4	April 10–14, 2006	16 — 20	32	36	
