= War and Destiny =

- Poster
- War and Destiny 亂世佳人
- Genre: Period Drama
- Starring: Myolie Wu; Ron Ng; Sunny Chan; Leila Tong; Mandy Cho; Lau Dan; Bill Chan; Halina Tam
- Opening theme: "幸而" by Myolie Wu
- Country of origin: Hong Kong
- Original language: Cantonese
- No. of episodes: 27 (Hong Kong); 30 (Overseas)

Production
- Running time: 45 minutes (approx.)

Original release
- Network: TVB
- Release: March 12 – April 14, 2007

War and Destiny (Traditional Chinese: 亂世佳人) is a TVB period drama series released overseas in July 2006 and broadcast on TVB Jade Channel in March 2007.

== Production note ==
The background of the plot is set in the Nanjing during World War II, and the characters live through the infamous Rape of Nanjing. The Chinese title for this series shares the same Chinese name with the 1939 film Gone with the Wind. To fit the general ratings on TVB, the series toned down much of the violence and bloodshed.

== Synopsis ==
The Ku family are living in the Republic of China era (1930s) as a prestigious household in a wealthy part of Nanjing. Soon, words spread that the city is being taken over by Imperial Japanese forces. The Ku family, which had all daughters and a father and mother of weakening health, are soon forced to pack their belongings to leave the war torn area. One of their servants recommends they move to the rural areas. To their dismay, life is incredibly difficult and they live in poverty. The family is in pieces as each daughter struggles with numerous difficulties in the countryside. However, all members of the family eventually grow closer together as they work in the rural area.

Eventually, Nanjing falls to Japan. One of the daughters, Ping-On, was shocked to find out that Hao-Yee, a childhood friend, is actually the son of Japanese military officer Chung Tin-Ngai (Shek Sau). She also discovers that Hao-Yee, whom she considers to be her fiancé, is actually in love with Cheng Yuet-Fung (Leila Tong), the 4th wife of her father. Meanwhile, he is also treated as a spy and traitor by all the Chinese villagers he grew up with. In the end Ping-On unexpectedly falls in love with Poon Sai-Cheung (Sunny Chan) whom she had first hated with a passion and believed to be a traitor...

== Cast ==
Cast	Role	Relations	Description
Ron Ng	Tin Hao-Yee (田孝義)/ Chung Tin Hao-Yee (松田孝義) Matsuda Takayoshi	Friend of Ku Ping-On Son of Chung Tin-Ngai; Lover of Cheng Yuet-Fung	He began his childhood as a poor Chinese villager in Nanking. He once had many Chinese friends and even risked his life to free a rice supply from the imperial Japanese troops to feed the villagers. Eventually he turned out to be genetically Japanese and lost credibility with the Chinese people. He was also in love with Ku Man-Chai's fourth wife, Cheng Yuet Fung, even though he knew he wasn't allowed. At the end of the series, Cheng Yuet-Fung marries him.
Myolie Wu	Ku Ping-On (顧平安)	Friend of Tin Hao-Yee Daughter of Ku Man-Chai Daughter of Yeung Sau-Lin	She is the hardest working member of the Ku family. But was mostly an illiterate and naive farm girl.
Sunny Chan	Poon Sai-Cheung (潘世昌)	Lover of Ku Ping-On	He began as a wealthy merchant and appeared as a businessman who sold anything to the Japanese and betrayed China. He turned out to be a Chinese republican spy.
Lau Dan	Ku Man-Chai (顧萬齊)	Husband of Yeung Sau-Lin Husband of Luk Yin-Chun Husband of Cheng Yuet-Fung Father of Ku Ping-On Father of Ku Dak-Yee Father of Ku Chiu-Yee Father of Ku Oi-Yee	Rice Merchant and head of the Ku household. He tried hard to keep the family together, though he was obsessed with old traditions and the preserving of family surnames via a male child.
Leila Tong	Cheng Yuet-Fung (鄭月鳳)	Ku Man-Chai's 4th wife Lover of Tin Hao-Yee	She was forced to be married into the Ku family by her brother. Her original purpose in the Ku family was to have a male child to prolong the Ku family name. Ku Man-Chai was old enough to be her father. She was actually in love with the much younger Tin Hao-Yee.
Halina Tam	Luk Yin-Chun (陸燕珍)	Ku Man-Chai's 3rd wife	She was supposed to father a male child for the Ku family. But her son was born mentally ill and was constantly looked down upon in the family.
Angelina Lo (盧宛茵)	Yung Yuk-Wah (容玉華)	Ku Man-Chai's 1st wife	She was the oldest and main wife of the family. Though she was accustomed to the high lifestyle in Nanking and had difficulties adjusting to the war time poverty life.
Bill Chan	Chung Tin-Ngai (松田毅) Matsuda Takeshi	Tin Hao-Yee's father	He started as a Japanese merchant, but had significant influence on Japanese troops, commanders and Nanking politics.
Mandy Cho	Shum Yi-Ping (沈依萍)		She was a shidaiqu nightclub singer who also played a major role as a spy.
Anita Kwan (關伊彤)	Ku Dak-Yee (顧得兒)	Daughter of Ku Man-Chai Daughter of Yung Yuk-Wah	She was the most educated member of the family, but struggled in the farm life where education and literacy was often useless.
Charmaine Li	Ku Chiu-Yee (顧昭兒)	Daughter of Ku Man-Chai	She wanted to be a Hong Kong movie star. But later ended up making Japanese propaganda films.
Casper Chan (陳凱怡)	Ku Oi-Yee (顧愛兒)	Daughter of Ku Man-Chai Daughter of Yung Yuk-Wah	She was a bookworm, who had asthma and numerous health problems.
Mary Hon (韓馬利)	Yeung Sau-Lin (楊秀蓮)	Lover and servant of Ku Man-Chai Mother of Ku Ping-On	
Samuel Kwok (郭鋒)	Lit Wun Shan (聶泓山)		He was a Japanese businessman and film director who tried to install Japanese culture into China. He had constant political conflict.
Akina Hong (康華)	(梁 好)	Sister-in-law of Cheng Yuet-Fung Married to Cheng Yuet-Fung's brother	After arranging the marriage between Ku Man-Chai and the much younger Cheng Yuet-Fung, she and her gambling addict husband constantly went to Yuet-Fung for more money. When her husband died, she was part of a ploy that helped clear Yuet-Fung of a murder charge.

== Comparison with reality ==
- The Japanese troops did not commit much atrocities in the series. The killing was portrayed in a manner that was often quick and very clean. Especially during the grave scene where the hundreds of innocent citizens were buried, the bodies were all intact.
- In the story Ku Man-Chai had 4 wives, each trying to give birth to a male son. Up until the 1930s Republic of China era, this was common practice in the culture. And was a major problem in China up until it was fixed by the more extreme One Child Policy.
- The earlier Ku family owned a private truck, while Poon Sai-Cheung owned a Rolls-Royce. Both attempted to escape war-torn Nanking by car, while the other 99% of the population escaped on foot. This demonstrates the huge wealth gap between the rich and poor.

== Viewership ratings ==
	Week	Episode	Average Points	Peaking Points	References
1	March 12–16, 2007	1 — 5	30	34	
2	March 19–23, 2007	6 — 10	30	—	
3	March 26–30, 2007	11 — 15	30	—	
4	April 2–6, 2007	16 — 20	28	—	
5	April 9–13, 2007	21 — 25	32	35	
5	April 14, 2007	26 — 27	31	—	

== Awards and nominations ==
40th TVB Anniversary Awards (2007)

- Nominated - "Best Drama"
- Nominated - "Best Actress in a Leading Role" (Myolie Wu - Ku Ping-On)
- Nominated - "Best Actor in a Supporting Role" (Lau Dan - Ku Man-Chai)
- Nominated - "Best Actor in a Supporting Role" (Bill Chan - Chung Tin-Ngai)
- Nominated - "Most Improved Actress" (Leila Tong - Cheng Yuet-Fung)
- Nominated - "My Favourite Female Character Role" (Myolie Wu - Ku Ping-On)

TVB Star Awards Malaysia Awards (2007)

- My Top Favourite TV Characters: Myolie Wu (War and Destiny)
