= Kids' Lives Matter =

2021 Hong Kong television series

- Also known as: 星空下的仁醫
- Genre: Medical drama; Pediatrics; Romance
- Written by: Poon Man-hung
- Directed by: Ben Fong; Au Yiu-kit; Cheung Hang-ho; Ho Ka-wah
- Starring: Kevin Cheng; Kenneth Ma; Linda Chung; Catherine Chau; Him Law
- Opening theme: "Cherish" by Linda Chung
- Country of origin: Hong Kong
- Original language: Cantonese
- No. of episodes: 25

Production
- Producer: Ben Fong
- Production location: Hong Kong
- Running time: 43 minutes
- Production company: TVB

Original release
- Network: TVB
- Release: October 18 – November 22, 2021

Kids' Lives Matter (Chinese: 星空下的仁醫; lit. 'Doctors Under the Stars') is a Hong Kong medical television series created by television network TVB, with Ben Fong serving as producer. The 25-episode series premiered on 18 October 2021 and concluded on 22 November 2021. Set against the backdrop of pediatric surgery, it stars Kevin Cheng, Kenneth Ma, Linda Chung, and Catherine Chau, and chronicles the lives of medical interns, residents, and attendings caring for sick children at the fictional Princess Anne Hospital.

== Cast ==
- Kevin Cheng as Dr. Johnathan Hui Gam-fung – pediatric surgeon and Consultant doctor
- Kenneth Ma as Dr. Amos Fong Chung-yan – pediatric surgeon and Consultant doctor
- Linda Chung as Dr. Eman Cheung Yi-sum – pediatric cardiothoracic surgeon
- Catherine Chau as Dr. Kay Mak Hoi-kei – chief of service of pediatric department
- Him Law as Dr. Max Man Pak-hei – pediatric resident specialist
- Mimi Kung as Dr. Flora Chung Wai-seung – Dean of School of Medicine
- Bowie Cheung as Dr. Candice Lin Cheuk-ying – anesthetic medical intern
- Regina Ho as Dr. Esther Yu Chi-wa – pediatric medical intern
- Gabriel Harrison as Dr. Paul Chow Chun-yiu – Hospital Chief Executive
- Florence Kwok as Dr. Joey Kwok Bo-ying – anesthesiologist

== Plot ==
The story begins with a flashback in 2001 introducing Johnathan Hui, Amos Fong, and Eman Cheung as medical interns. An operation causes a rift between Hui and Fong, leading to them becoming estranged. Flash to the present, Hui and Fong are pediatric surgeons and work at North West Hospital and Princess Anne Hospital, respectively. One day, Hui asks Fong to perform a liver transplant operation jointly. An anesthetic mistake occurs during the procedure where Cheung, a cardiothoracic surgeon, appears timely to rescue. She returns to Hong Kong after being a Doctor Without Borders and is now a newly contracted doctor at Princess Anne Hospital.
With the ambitious vision of building a pediatric facility, Fong uses tactics to make Hui join Princess Anne Hospital. He then recruits Hui, Cheung, and a few other doctors, including Max Man, a resident specialist, Kay Mak, pediatric chief of service and Fong's love–interest, and Joey Kwok, an anesthesiologist, to create an "elite" surgery team, building themselves an influential reputation to pave the way for Fong's vision. The team faces various obstacles during the process, with Hui and Fong reconciling their friendship. The truth of the operation incident in the past also gets revealed. Although Fong's vision is not yet realized towards the end of the series; the doctors experience growth in both their personal and professional lives.

== Production and background ==
The series was produced by Ben Fong and script supervised by Poon Man-hung, with direction handled by Fong alongside a rotating team of directors. It marks TVB's first medical drama focused on pediatric surgery, utilizing a team of professional doctors as technical consultants throughout filming. The set for the fictional Princess Anne Hospital was modeled after the Hong Kong Children's Hospital, with principal photography taking place from August to December 2020. The series also marked Linda Chung's return to television after a six-year hiatus from the industry.

== Music ==
The soundtrack consists of 4 individually released singles as follows:

Kids' Lives Matter

Soundtrack album by Various Artists
- Released: October 2021
- Genre: Cantopop
- Languages: Cantonese, English
- Label: The Voice Entertainment Group
- Producers: Herman To & Joseph Wei & Alex Lau

Track Listing
No.	Title	Lyrics	Music	Artist(s)	Length
1.	"Cherish (好好珍惜自己)"	Cheung Mei-yin	Linda Chung, Nick Wong	Linda Chung	3:45
2.	"Couldn't Tell (不敢開口)"	Vivian Koo	Andy Ho & Johnny Yim	Vivian Koo	4:37
3.	"Fear In My Heart (我會害怕)"	Hayes Yeung	Johnny Yim & Alan Cheung	Hana Kuk	3:46
4.	"Never Too Late"	Quinn Lui	Kong Fai & Marley Chan & Chan Chung-wai	Quinn Lui	3:53

== Reception and ratings ==
Kids' Lives Matter garnered mainly positive reviews from the audience and media, who commented on the show's "convincing" acting and "moving" storyline. Lam Chun-king from HK01, on the one hand, criticized the series's overall storyline direction for being old-fashioned but nevertheless indicated "the compactness of the script, the richness of the story's content, and the actors' performance set the show as a TVB's masterpiece in recent years and a classic among medical dramas". An editor from Hong Kong Economic Times praised Linda Chung's maturity in her acting skills and wrote that she could fully "express the tenderness of maternal love when interacting with sick children". Although Chung did not win in the end, she was noted by the media to be among viewers' favorites for the "Best Actress" title at the 54th TVB Anniversary Awards.

Week	Episodes	Airing dates	Average ratings (Note: According to Hong Kong's TV rating system, each rating point represents approximately 64,670 viewers.)	Ref.
1	1 – 5	18–22 October 2021	18.5 points	
2	6 – 10	25–29 October 2021	18.9 points	
3	11 – 15	1–5 November 2021	19.4 points	
4	16 – 20	8–12 November 2021	19.3 points	
5	21 – 24	15–18 November 2021	19.9 points	
6	25	22 November 2021	22.8 points	

== Awards and nominations ==
Year	Award	Category	Nominated work	Results	Ref.
2021	54th TVB Anniversary Awards	My Favorite Television Series (Malaysia)	Kids' Lives Matter	Won	
2021	54th TVB Anniversary Awards	My Favorite Actress In A Leading Role (Malaysia)	Linda Chung	Won	
2021	54th TVB Anniversary Awards	My Favorite Actor In A Leading Role (Malaysia)	Kevin Cheng	Nominated	
2021	54th TVB Anniversary Awards	Best Television Series	Kids' Lives Matter	Nominated	
2021	54th TVB Anniversary Awards	Best Actor	Kevin Cheng	Nominated	
2021	54th TVB Anniversary Awards	Best Actor	Kenneth Ma	Nominated	
2021	54th TVB Anniversary Awards	Best Actress	Linda Chung	Nominated	
2021	54th TVB Anniversary Awards	Best Supporting Actor	Him Law	Nominated	
2021	54th TVB Anniversary Awards	Best Supporting Actress	Regina Ho	Nominated	
2021	54th TVB Anniversary Awards	My Favorite Male Character In A Television Series	Kenneth Ma (for Amos Fong)	Won	
2021	54th TVB Anniversary Awards	My Favorite Female Character In A Television Series	Linda Chung (for Eman Cheung)	Nominated	
2021	54th TVB Anniversary Awards	Best On-screen Partnership	Kevin Cheng & Linda Chung	Nominated	
2021	54th TVB Anniversary Awards	Best Television Theme song	"Cherish"	Nominated	
2022	Asian Academy Creative Awards	Best Television Series	Kids' Lives Matter	Won	
2022	Asian Academy Creative Awards	Best Actor	Kenneth Ma	Won	

== Overseas releases ==
In Singapore, the series was broadcast in June 2022 on Mediacorp Channel 8 with Mandarin dubbing. The original Cantonese version was made accessible through the Mediacorp OTT service MeWATCH. In Malaysia, the series was aired in October 2022.
