= My Love Story (Linda Chung album) =

Studio album by Linda Chung
- Released: 12 November 2009
- Genre: Cantopop
- Length: 51:01
- Label: Star Entertainment Limited
- Producer: Andrew Tuason; Johnny Yim; Billy Chan

Linda Chung chronology
| Dinner for One, World for Two (2008) | My Love Story (2009) | My Private Selection (2011) |

My Love Story is the second studio album by Chinese-Canadian actress, singer and songwriter Linda Chung. It was released on 12 November 2009 by Star Entertainment Limited. It consists of 12 tracks, of which two are Mandarin while the rest are Cantonese.

Chung wrote several of the tracks with producers Andrew Tuason and Johnny Yim. It contains an adaptation of the Bart Howard song, "Fly Me to the Moon". "I Heard You Love Me" is a remake of a song from the artist Sandy Lam.

== Track listing ==
| No. | Title | Writer(s) | Producer(s) | Length |
|---|---|---|---|---|
| 1. | "日夜想你 (Thinking of You Day and Night)" | Sandy Cheung; Linda Chung; Andrew Tuason | Andrew Tuason | 4:07 |
| 2. | "明爭暗鬥 (Fighting in the Light and Shadows)" | Albert Leung; Chui Tsang Hei; Johnny Yim; James Pun | Johnny Yim | 3:51 |
| 3. | "暗示 (Sign)" | Sandy Cheung; Alan Cheung; Johnny Yim | Johnny Yim | 3:44 |
| 4. | "戀愛令人心痛 (Love Breaks a Heart)" | Sandy Cheung; Jay Chou; Andrew Tuason | Andrew Tuason | 3:56 |
| 5. | "Cha Cha Cha" | Kit Wong; Kine Ludvigsen; Roxanne Seeman; Olav Fossheim | Andrew Tuason | 2:57 |
| 6. | "有一天 (One Day)" | Wong Cho-lam; 鍾偉權; Linda Chung; Andrew Tuason | Andrew Tuason | 4:48 |
| 7. | "Fly Me to the Moon" | Bart Howard | Andrew Tuason | 3:29 |
| 8. | "生死也為愛 (Life and Death for Love)" | Gene Lau; Linda Chung | | 4:00 |
| 9. | "聽說你愛我 (I Heard You Love Me)" | Sandy Cheung; Peter Lee (musician); Andrew Tuason | Andrew Tuason | 4:58 |
| 10. | "白羊座的情歌 (Arie’s Love Song)" | Sandy Cheung; Alan Cheung; Johnny Yim | Johnny Yim | 3:08 |
| 11. | "有一天" | Wong Cho-lam; 鍾偉權; Linda Chung | Andrew Tuason | 4:48 |
| 12. | "讓我繼續愛你" | Linda Chung; Chien Yao; Andrew Tuason | Billy Chan | 4:05 |
| 13. | "白羊座的情歌 (Arie’s Love Song)" | Kit Wong; Cindy Yen; Johnny Yim | Johnny Yim | 3:08 |
| Total length: | | | | 51:01 |
