= House of Harmony and Vengeance =

Hong Kong television series

- Promotional poster
- 耀舞長安
- Genre: Costume drama Comedy
- Written by: Lau Choi-wan
- Starring: Bobby Au-yeung; Linda Chung; Myolie Wu; Evergreen Mak; Angela Tong; Yoyo Chen; JJ Jia
- Opening theme: "Love Song" (愛歌) by Wong Cho-lam, Louis Yuen, Johnson Lee
- Country of origin: Hong Kong
- Original language: Cantonese
- No. of episodes: 30

Production
- Executive producer: Nelson Cheung
- Production location: Hong Kong
- Camera setup: Multi camera
- Running time: 45 mins.
- Production company: TVB

Original release
- Network: Jade; HD Jade
- Release: April 30 – June 8, 2012

Related
- The Greatness of a Hero; No Good Either Way

House of Harmony and Vengeance
- Traditional Chinese: 耀舞長安
- Simplified Chinese: 耀舞长安
- Literal meaning: "dazzling dances of Chang'an"
Transcriptions
Standard Mandarin
- Hanyu Pinyin: Yào Wǔ Cháng'ān
Yue: Cantonese
- Jyutping: Jiu6 Mou5 Coeng4 On1

House of Harmony and Vengeance is a Hong Kong costume-comedy television drama produced by TVB under executive producer Nelson Cheung. The drama centers on a group of musicians and dancers from the Imperial Music Bureau during the prosperous Tang dynasty of China. It stars Bobby Au-yeung and Linda Chung as the main leads, with Myolie Wu, Evergreen Mak, Angela Tong, Yoyo Chen and JJ Jia as the major supporting cast.

== Production ==
During the production of House of Harmony and Vengeance, the drama was given the working title "樂府藏龍" (jyutping: ngok6 fu2 cong4 lung4; pinyin: yuèfǔ cánglóng; literally "Music Bureau's Hidden Dragon"), a word play on the Chinese proverb "臥虎藏龍" (jyutping: ngo6 fu2 cong4 lung4; pinyin: wòhǔ cánglóng), which refers to the undiscovered talents that lie beneath the surface of a normal-looking individual.

A costume fitting press conference was held at TVB City's Studio 1 in Tseung Kwan O on 6 May 2011. Filming began 16 May 2011 at TVB Studios. The blessing ceremony was held at the studios on 14 June 2011.

=== Casting ===
Producer Nelson Cheung cast Bobby Au-yeung, Sheren Tang, Moses Chan, and Myolie Wu in the lead roles in November 2010. Cheung planned to cast Sheren Tang in female lead role, but Tang was already booked to film for Mainland Chinese period drama Qing Cheng Xue during the same time as House's filming schedule. Cheung then cast Linda Chung to replace Tang's female lead role. Linda Chung is cast in her 1st semi-villain role. To focus on his coffee shop business, Chan withdrew from the production in early April 2011, a month before filming commenced. TVB's Production Department supervisor Tommy Leung then offered Bowie Lam the role, but Lam rejected the offer, stating that he has already accepted to film a Mainland Chinese production. Suggested by Au-yeung, the role was then offered to Mak Cheung-ching, who accepted it two weeks before filming. Before the casting of Mak, Cheung has once considered Pierre Ngo for the role, and even sought for the script to be rewritten to accommodate Ngo.

== Main cast ==
- Bobby Au-yeung as Kiu Bo-lung (喬步龍) / Tai Ming-but (戴名鈸), a vagrant street entertainer. Like his father and three younger adopted siblings, Ming-but has encyclopedic knowledge of all different types of musical instruments and dances. After accidentally killing a government official's son, who attempted to rape his sister, But takes up the identity of Music Bureau official Kiu Bo-lung (assuming that the real Kiu Bo-lung was dead) to avoid prosecution.
- Linda Chung as Bin Yuk-yin (卞玉嫣), the leading dancer for Cheung Lai Yuen who is competing for the spot of imperial dance courtesan. She was previously trained in the Chun Yat Yuen dance academy, under instructor Yim Mo-chun (Jess Sum). Yuk-yin has a twin brother, Yuk-long, who also works for the same dance academy. Before Yuk-yin was born, her parents betrothed her to Kiu Bo-lung. Good friend turned enemy of Tsoi-shan and conspires with Cheuk-law to hurt her. In the end she found the truth and they became friends again with Le Tsoi-Shan and Bin Yuk-yin becoming princess.
- Myolie Wu as Lei Tsoi-shan (利在山), a peasant girl who ends up as a leading dancer for Cheung Lai Yuen who is competing for the spot of imperial dance courtesan. Tsoi-shan grew up with her mother in a village next to the capital city, selling wood and charcoal for a living. She auditions to be a dancer at Cheung Lai Yuen for a better income and a chance to find her father, who is the Emperor.
- Evergreen Mak as Ko Yan (高仁) / Kiu Bo-lung (喬步龍), a Music Bureau official who looks over Cheung Lai Yuen. In a quarrel with Ming-but, Bo-lung loses his memory and gets half of his face burnt. He meets Ming-but again at Cheung Lai Yuen, who names him Ko Yan, and the two become good friends. Initially working as an assistant chef, he later becomes a music supervisor for Cheung Lai Yuen on the recommendation by Ming-but. Turns enemy when he found out that Ming-but has caused the death of his father.
- Angela Tong as Chu Lam-yuet (朱攬月), Cheung Lai Yuen's strict dance instructor and But's father's love interest. She divorced her husband to pursue her passion for dancing. Before becoming an instructor, she was the capital city's most famous dancer.
- Yoyo Chen as Kuk Wan-wan (曲彎彎), Yuen-yuen's protective older sister. Wan-wan previously lost out in an audition against her sister for Cheung Lai Yeun after falling ill, and is forced to take up dance lessons in Phoenix Academy, a poorly invested dance facility. She later joins Cheung Lai Yuen after proving her natural talent.
- JJ Jia as Lau Cheuk-law (柳灼蘿), Chun Yat Yuen's scheming lead dancer and Yuk-yin's main opponent for the spot of imperial dance courtesan, in hopes of being the prince's wife. She seduces Suet-chung to gain an upper hand in the industry, but eventually falls in love with him.

== Recurring cast ==
- Grace Wong as Tai Hor-sau (戴可秀), But's younger adopted sister and an aspiring dancer. She is later accepted into Cheung Lai Yuen.
- Oscar Leung as Bin Yuk-long (卞玉郎), Yuk-yin's twin brother who works as a porter for Cheung Lai Yuen. He has a passion for dancing, and is willing to cross-dress for a chance to perform.
- William Chak as Ngo Suet-chung (敖雪松), Yuen-yuen's love interest. He is the image consultant and hair/costume designer for the dancers of the Music Bureau and the capital city's dance academies. Brought up in a household full of women, Suet-chung is knowledgeable in the arts of fashion and beauty.
- Sire Ma as Kuk Yuen-yuen (曲圓圓), a senior dancer for Cheung Lai Yuen. At eighteen years old, she is the youngest dancer at the academy. Kind and naïve, Yuen-yuen is extremely dependent on her older sister Wan-wan, although she joins Cheung Lai Yuen before her sister. Yuen-yuen falls in love with Suet-chung, the Music Bureau's young image consultant, and vies for his attention.
- Jess Sum as Yim Mo-chun.
- Kwok Fung as Tai Tou (戴刀), But's father. He loves Lam Yuet.
- Stephen Wong as Tai On-nam (戴岸南), But's younger adopted brother and an inventor.
- Kelvin Leung as Tai Nim-yan (戴念恩), But's youngest adopted brother.
- Aurora Li as Mung-fei (夢菲), a dancer.
- Ching Hor-wai as the Empress.
- Mannor Chan as the head maid servant of the Music Bureau.
- Matthew Ko as the Crown Prince.
- Rosanne Lui as Tsoi-shan's mother.
- Anita Chan (陳穎妍) as Concubine Low
- Leung Kin-ping
- Ha Ping as Kiu Bo-lung's grandmother.
- Lee Yee-man
- Luvin Ho
- Iva Law
- Tina Shek
- Vanko Wong
- Coffee Lam

== Viewership ratings ==
Week	Originally Aired	Episodes	Average Points	Peaking Points	References
1	April 30 - May 4, 2012	1 — 5	29	33	
2	May 7–11, 2012	6 — 10	30	33	
3	May 14–18, 2012	11 — 15	30	34	
4	May 21–25, 2012	16 — 20	29	32	
5	May 28 - June 1, 2012	21 — 25	29	34	
6	June 4–8, 2012	26 — 30	30	35	

== International Broadcast ==
- Malaysia - 8TV (Malaysia)

== See also ==
- Yuefu
- Music Bureau
