= Miss Chinese International Pageant 2004 =

- Date: January 17, 2004
- Presenters: Louis Yuen; Kingdom Yuen; Michael Tse; Joyce Chen; Bondy Chiu; Johnny Tang; Vinci Wong
- Entertainment: Andy Hui; Cecilia Cheung; Jordan Chan
- Venue: TVB City, Hong Kong
- Broadcaster: TVB
- Entrants: 21
- Placements: 5
- Winner: Linda Chung; Canada
- Congeniality: Mandy Cho; Hong Kong

Miss Chinese International Pageant 2004, the 16th Miss Chinese International Pageant, was held on January 17, 2004 in Hong Kong. The pageant was organized and televised by TVB in Hong Kong. At the end of the pageant, Miss Chinese International 2003 Rachel Tan of Kuala Lumpur, Malaysia crowned Linda Chung of Vancouver, British Columbia, Canada as the new winner.

== Pageant information ==
The theme to the 2004 pageant was "China's Elegance of a Lifetime, The Blossoming of Chinese Like Hundreds of Flowers" 「中國盛世風采 華裔百花吐艷」. The Masters of Ceremonies included Vinci Wong and the cast of Virtues of Harmony, including Louis Yuen, Kingdom Yuen, Michael Tse, Joyce Chen, Bondy Chiu, Johnny Tang. Special performing guests were cantopop singers Andy Hui, Cecilia Cheung, and Jordan Chan.

== Results ==
=== Placements ===
Placement	Contestant
Miss Chinese International 2004	Canada – Linda Chung 鍾嘉欣
1st Runner-Up	Hong Kong – Mandy Cho 曹敏莉
2nd Runner-Up	Philippines – Carlene Aguilar 洪巧玲
Top 5	Malaysia – Vivien Yeo 楊㛢僡; United States – Jessica Xu 徐靜潔

=== Special awards ===
- Miss Friendship: Mandy Cho 曹敏莉 (Hong Kong)
- Miss Radiant Smile: Carlene Aguilar 洪巧玲 (Manila)

== Contestant list ==
No.	Contestant Name	Represented City	Represented Country	Age	Chinese Origin
1	Qian Li (李倩)	Brisbane	Australia	21	Shanghai
2	Mandy Wang (王彥文)	Taipei	Chinese Taipei	25	Taiwan
3	Vivien Yeo (楊㛢僡)	Kuala Lumpur	Malaysia	19	Fujian
4	Wan Sin Wong (王雲仙)	Sydney	Australia	20	Jiangsu
5	Tithirad Hengsakul (王美玉)	Bangkok	Thailand	23	Chaozhou
6	Myrna Seow (蕭貝玲)	Tahiti	French Polynesia	24	Hakka
7	Christina Wang (王雅帆)	Seattle	USA	20	Hubei
8	Jessica Xu (徐靜潔)	Los Angeles	USA	19	Shanghai
9	Vivian Tran (陳天欣)	Frankfurt	Germany	20	Guangdong
10	My My Ngo (吳美美)	Montréal	Canada	22	Hainan
11	Xiao Ting LI (李肖婷)	Auckland	New Zealand	25	Liaoning
12	Linda Chung (鍾嘉欣)	Vancouver	Canada	19	Guangdong
13	Sharon Hong (方曉茹)	Calgary	Canada	22	Fujian
14	Ivy Feng (馮柔)	Chicago	USA	25	Tianjin
15	Hui Xian Wee (王會嫺)	Singapore	Singapore	22	Hainan
16	Sarina Lee (李翹欣)	Toronto	Canada	20	Guangdong
17	Mandy Cho (曹敏莉)	Hong Kong	Hong Kong	21	Shanghai
18	Lien Xian (冼麗欣)	New York City	USA	17	Guangdong
19	Amanda Ong (王鑽絲)	Melbourne	Australia	25	Guangdong
20	Carolina Achoy Man (徐美儀)	Lima	Peru	18	Zhongshan
21	Carlene Aguilar (洪巧玲)	Manila	Philippines	21	Fujian

== Crossovers ==
Contestants who previously competed or will be competing at other international beauty pageants:

Miss World

- 2005: Philippines: Carlene Aguilar (Top 15)

Miss Earth

- 2001: Philippines: Carlene Aguilar (Top 10)

== Contestant notes ==
- Carlene Aguilar of Manila competed at a number of international pageants. She was a top 10 semifinalist at Miss Earth 2001. Aguilar went on to act for TVB, before traveling to Sanya, China to compete in the Miss World 2005 pageant. Aguilar finished as a top 15 semifinalist.
