= Lee Yee-man =

Lee Yee-man (Chinese: 李綺雯 born October 18, 1984, in Hong Kong) is a Hong Kong actress and host. She won the 2001 ATV actress competition, and began her acting career at ATV. Later, in 2007 she began acting for TVB.

== ATV series ==
Television
Year	English title	Role	Notes
2003	Light of Million Hopes		
2005	A Dream Named Desire II		
2006	Hong Kong Criminal Files		

== TVB series ==
Television
Year	English title	Role	Notes
2007-2008	Best Selling Secrets	Lulu	
2007	On the First Beat	An Tsz Wai (安子惠)	
2007	Marriage of Inconvenience	Bebe	
2008	Your Class or Mine	Carol	
2008-2010	Off Pedder	Icy	
2009	A Watchdog's Tale	Chow Daai Dai (周帶弟)	
2010	The Mysteries of Love	Jay Jay	
2010	Twilight Investigation	Gei An Lok(紀安樂)	
2011	Only You	Miki	
2011	Curse of the Royal Harem	Choi-yin	
2012	Let It Be Love		
2012	Daddy Good Deeds		
2012	House of Harmony and Vengeance		
2012	Witness Insecurity	Cheung Lai-guen	
2012	Three Kingdoms RPG	Hau-lin	
2012	Friendly Fire		
2013	The Day of Days		
2013	Season of Love		
2013	Sergeant Tabloid		
2013	A Great Way to Care II		
2013	Slow Boat Home		
2014	Storm in a Cocoon		
2015	Madam Cutie On Duty	Wan Cing	
2015	Wudang Rules	Man Yee-lei	
2015	Ghost of Relativity	Angie	
2015-2016	The Executioner	Sik Cheung-yee	
2016	Speed of Life	Wan Choi-fung	
2016	The Last Healer in Forbidden City	Consort Gan	
2016	Presumed Accidents	May Kwan Wai-mei	
2017	Married but Available	阿牛	

=== Film ===
- Shock Wave (2017)
