= Legend of the Demigods =

Cantonese fantasy television series

- Official poster
- 搜神傳
- Genre: Fantasy-adventure
- Starring: Linda Chung; Benny Chan; Sunny Chan; Halina Tam; Stephen Au; Nancy Wu; Charmaine Li
- Ending theme: Fat Sai (發誓) performed by Linda Chung
- Country of origin: Hong Kong
- Original languages: Cantonese; Mandarin
- No. of episodes: 42 (Hong Kong); 22 (Overseas)

Production
- Producer: Lee Tim-shing
- Running time: 45 minutes per episode

Original release
- Network: TVB
- Release: 25 August – 17 October 2008

Legend of the Demigods (Chinese: 搜神傳) is a TVB fantasy-adventure TV series starring Linda Chung, Benny Chan and Sunny Chan as the main lead, with Halina Tam, Stephen Au, Nancy Wu and Charmaine Li as the main supporting cast. The ending theme song Fat Sai (Chinese: 發誓; lit. 'Swear') is performed by Linda Chung and can be found in the Lady in Red album. It was produced in 2007 and first broadcast in August 2008.

== Plot ==
Gai Choi-Chi is no different from an ordinary girl, except that Lady Luck seems to smile upon her and keep her out of trouble all the time. She is thus nicknamed "Ho-Choi Mui" ("Lucky Girl"). However, she does not know that her stepmother, called Ho-Choi Ma, is actually a plant spirit. Choi-Chi helps some deities defeat an evil spirit once and her stepmother turns her into a demigod to save her life.

As a child, Shek Kam-Dong was constantly bullied and looked down upon, but he still remains filial to his mother and shows great respect for the gods. Wong Tai Sin, a wish-granting god, takes pity on Shek and grants him superhuman strength. However, Shek starts to abuse his new power and uses it to bully others, becoming a local tyrant in town.

An Hei has narcolepsy, as he is always tired and falls asleep at random timings. Wong Tai-Sin tries to help An Hei by presenting him a magical sword that is possessed by the spirit of a warrior. Whenever An Hei runs into trouble, the powerful spirit will possess him and help him defeat his enemies.

One day, an evil wizard disturbs the quiet town and captures Ho-Choi Ma. Gai Choi-Chi, Shek Kam-Dong and An Hei joins hands to confront the wizard and defeat her to save Ho-Choi Ma. They travel across the continent on their heroic quest, encountering strange and mystical events along the journey.

== Cast ==
Cast	Role	Description
Linda Chung	Gwai Choi-Chi 薊彩芝 (好彩妹)	Shek Kam-Dong and Chiang Chin's good friend An Hei's lover
Benny Chan	Shek Kam-Dong 石敢當	Gwai Choi-Chi's good friend
Sunny Chan	An Hei 晏喜	Gwai Choi-Chi's lover
Halina Tam	Mo Kik Tin Chuen 無極天尊	Evil Grand Wizard
Nancy Wu	Ka Lau-Loh/Mok Che 迦樓羅/莫邪	Grand Wizard's follower Died in episode 17.
Stephen Au	Gon Cheung 干將	Sword Spirit
Kara Hui	Cho Mong-Yau/Ho Choi-Ma 草忘憂 (好彩媽)	Plant spirit Gai Choi-Chi's stepmother.
Charmaine Li	Shek Kam-Yin 石敢言	Shek Kam-Dong's younger sister.
Casper Chan	Chiang Chin 蔣倩	Gwai Choi-Chi's good friend.
Anderson Junior	Wong Tai-Sin 黃大仙	Heavenly God; Shek Kam-Dong's godfather
Sherming Yiu	Lung Liu Sam-Leung 龍女三娘	Dragon princess Introduced in episode 09.

== Viewership ratings ==
	Week	Episode	Average Points	Peaking Points	References
1	August 25–29, 2008	1 — 5	27	28	
2	September 1–5, 2008	6 — 10	28	29	
3	September 8–12, 2008	11 — 15	29	30	
4	September 15–19, 2008	16 — 20	30	32	
5	September 22–26, 2008	21 — 25	31	33	
6	September 29 - October 3, 2008	26 — 30	32	34	
7	October 6–10, 2008	31 — 35	33	35	
8	October 13–16, 2008	36 — 40	34	37	
8	October 13–17, 2008	36 — 42	35	39	
8	October 17, 2008	41 — 42	35	39	
1-8	Aug 25 - Oct 17, 2008	Esp 1 - Esp 42	31	39	

== Award nominations ==
41st TVB Anniversary Awards (2008)

- "Best Drama"
- "My Favourite Male Character" (Sunny Chan - An Hei) (Top 15)
- "My Favourite Female Character" (Linda Chung - Gwai Choi-Chi) (Top 5)
