= Yahoo Buzz =

Yahoo! Buzz
- Website type: Social content website
- Dissolved: April 21, 2011
- Owner: Yahoo!
- Registration: Free
- Launched: October 30, 2000; 26 years ago
- Current status: Defunct in the United States and Canada

Yahoo! Buzz was a community-based news article website, heavily derived from Digg, that combined the features of social bookmarking and syndication through a user interface that allowed editorial control. Users could publish their own news stories, and link to their own or another person's site that had a full story of the information, thereby driving traffic to that person's website and creating a larger market for sites that researched and published their own news articles and stories, such as CNN or smaller, privately owned websites.

Yahoo! created the service in hopes that it would drive larger traffic to their site and would give them an advantage over larger online media companies such as Google and MSN, which were Yahoo!'s largest competitors in terms of search engines that provided services and web features to their customers. Unlike other social networking sites, Buzz allowed the publisher to modify the submission.

Yahoo! announced on April 19, 2011, that it was killing off Buzz as of April 21, 2011. "This was a hard decision. However this will help us focus on our core strengths and new innovations", the company wrote in a brief statement.

== See also ==
- Digg
- Newsvine
- Web 2.0
- Google Buzz
