= Yes, Sir. Sorry, Sir! =

Hong Kong television series

- Official poster
- 點解阿Sir係阿Sir
- Genre: Comedy; Drama
- Starring: Moses Chan; Linda Chung; Tavia Yeung; Ron Ng
- Theme music composer: Tang Chi-Wai; Yip Kai-Chung
- Opening theme: "春風化雨" by Moses Chan and Ron Ng
- Country of origin: Hong Kong
- Original languages: Cantonese; Mandarin
- No. of episodes: 30

Production
- Producer: Lau Kar Ho
- Production location: Hong Kong
- Camera setup: Multi camera
- Running time: 42 – 45 minutes
- Production company: TVB

Original release
- Network: TVB Jade
- Release: 18 April – 27 May 2011

Yes Sir. Sorry, Sir!
- Traditional Chinese: 點解阿Sir係阿Sir
- Simplified Chinese: 点解阿Sir系阿Sir
- Literal meaning: "Why is the Teacher a Cop"
Transcriptions
Standard Mandarin
- Hanyu Pinyin: Diǎn Jiě Ā Sir Xì Ā Sir
Yue: Cantonese
- Jyutping: Dim2 Gaai2 A3 Sir Hai6 A3 Sir

Yes, Sir. Sorry, Sir! (Cantonese: 點解阿Sir係阿Sir^{[a]}), is a 2011 Hong Kong television drama starring Moses Chan, Linda Chung, Tavia Yeung, and Ron Ng produced by Lau Kar Ho. Yes Sir. Sorry, Sir! is a TVB production.

"阿Sir" is a way to address both teachers and policemen. The meaning of the title is "So it turns out '阿Sir'(teacher) was an '阿Sir'(policeman)".

== Plot ==
Despite the fact that he comes from a long line of disciplined workers, Law Yiu-wah (Moses Chan) is a teacher at a notorious school. One day, he was urged to resign after being vilified by his students as a peeping Tom. At present, the triads have expanded their drug network at local schools. Wah, who has turned into a cop, is told to go undercover at the school where he used to teach. At school, he is impressed by the enthusiasm of a new teacher Ho Miu-suet (Tavia Yeung). He also comes to realize he was too strict with his students in the past. With a determination to boost students’ confidence, Suet invites bowling expert Koo Ka-lam (Linda Chung) to teach bowling at the school. When Wah learns about her triad background, he decides to go after her hoping to learn more about the triads. Wah also finds himself in a contest of wits with Inspector Ching Man-lik (Ron Ng), who has been assigned to work as a liaison officer at the school. On one hand, Man is attracted to Suet but on the other, she only loves Wah. All of a sudden, Wah, Suet, Lam, and Lik find themselves involved in a complicated love square.

== Cast ==
- Moses Chan as Law Yiu-wah
- Linda Chung as Carman Koo Ka-lam
- Tavia Yeung as Ho Miu-suet
- Ron Ng as Nick Ching Man-lik
- Ram Chiang as Poon Kwok-shing
- Law Lok-lam as Chiang Hung
- Joseph Lee as Ko Sun
- Savio Tsang as Ngai Fung
- Queenie Chu as Ceci Koo Ka-sin
- Law Kwan-moon as Cheung Pak-chuen
- Cilla Kung as Chung Ka-bo
- Brian Chu as Mok Chak-kei
- Dickson Wong as Fan Tai
- Calvin Chan as Chiang Chun
- Angel Chiang as Lin Li Xiang/Yumi

== Awards and nominations ==
=== 43rd Ming Pao Anniversary Awards 2011 ===
- My Most Supportive Performance (Linda Chung)
- Nominated: Outstanding Actress in Television (Linda Chung)

=== 45th TVB Anniversary Awards 2011 ===
- Won: Most Improved Male Artiste (Jin Au-yeung)
- Nominated: Best Drama (Top 5)
- Nominated: Best Actor (Moses Chan) Top 5
- Nominated: Best Actress (Linda Chung) Top 5
- Nominated: Best Supporting Actor (Lok-lam Law)
- Nominated: Best Supporting Actress (Queenie Chu)
- Nominated: My Favourite Male Character (Moses Chan)
- Nominated: My Favourite Female Character (Linda Chung) Top 5
- Nominated: Most Improved Female Artiste (Cilia Kung)

=== 16th Asian Television Awards 2011 ===
- Nominated: Best Comedy Performance by an Actor/Actress (Moses Chan)

== Viewership ratings ==
	Week	Episodes	Average Points	Peaking Points	References
1	April 18–22, 2011	1 — 5	27	30	
2	April 25–29, 2011	6 — 10	28	31	
3	May 2–6, 2011	11 — 15	29	33	
4	May 9–13, 2011	16 — 20	29	34	
5	May 16–20, 2011	21 — 25	29	31	
6	May 23–27, 2011	26 — 30	31	38	

<Yes Sir, Sorry Sir> in Episode 27, When Linda Chung < Miss Koo> crumble, Average Points 34 and Peaking Points 38

== International Broadcast ==
- Malaysia - 8TV (Malaysia)

== Notes ==
a The original title "點解阿Sir係阿Sir" was actually written in Cantonese; the title of the drama could be translated in Mandarin as "為何阿Sir是阿Sir"
