= Missing You (Hong Kong TV series) =

Hong Kong television series

- Promo poster
- Also known as: Blissful Ferris Wheel
- 幸福摩天輪
- Genre: Modern drama
- Created by: Hong Kong Television Broadcasts Limited
- Starring: Linda Chung; Jason Chan; Rosina Lam; KK Cheung; Cilla Kung; Calvin Chan
- Theme music composer: Tang Chi-Wai (鄧智偉)
- Opening theme: The Song of Fortune (幸福歌) by Linda Chung
- Country of origin: Hong Kong
- Original language: Cantonese
- No. of episodes: 20

Production
- Producer: Fong Chun-Chiu
- Production location: Hong Kong
- Camera setup: Multi camera
- Production company: TVB

Original release
- Network: TVB Jade
- Release: 18 December 2012 – 11 January 2013

Related
- Silver Spoon, Sterling Shackles; Inbound Troubles

Missing You
- Traditional Chinese: 幸福摩天輪
- Simplified Chinese: 幸福摩天轮
- Literal meaning: "Blissful Ferris Wheel"
Transcriptions
Standard Mandarin
- Hanyu Pinyin: Xìng fú mó tiān lún
Yue: Cantonese
- Jyutping: hang6 fuk1 mo1 tin1 Leon4

Missing You is a Hong Kong modern serial drama produced by TVB under producer Fong Chun-Chiu and starring Linda Chung, Jason Chan, Calvin Chan, Cilla Kung, and Rosina Lam.

== Plot ==
The series revolves around the Tracing Department of a charity group named Yan Ming Federation. It is responsible for helping families locate their missing loved ones, lost due to war, natural disaster, or other factors.

The series is roughly split into six segments, each revolving around a different case. The last two cases also had a very profound impact on one of the members of the Tracing Department.

According to the 779th edition of TVB Magazine, roughly half of the cases shown in the series are based on real-life cases.

== Cast ==
=== Main cast ===
Cast	Role	Description
Linda Chung	Hong Yu-Fung 康如楓	has a crush on Yik-Him; Yu-Pak's big sister works at Yan Ming Federation's Tracing Department; Yik Him's girlfriend
Jason Chan Chi-san	Sze Yik-Him 施亦謙	Vincci's ex-boyfriend works at Yan Ming Federation's Tracing Department; Hailey and Sam's half brother Yu-Fung's boyfriend
Calvin Chan	Yeung Chi-Kei 楊子基	Started off as part-time worker at Yan Ming Federation's Tracing Department, later promoted to full-time has crush on Crystal
Cilla Kung	Crystal Sin 冼潔貞	Nicknamed 洗潔精 (Dishwashing Soap in Chinese); Comes from a rich family
Rosina Lam	Vincci Ding 丁芃芝	worked at a Financial company, later resigned Yik-Him's ex-girlfriend Marcus' ex-girlfriend

=== Hong Family ===
Cast	Role	Description
Linda Chung	Hong Yu-Fung 康如楓	Hong Yu-Pak's big sister
Brian Chu	Hong Yu-Pak 康如柏	Yu-Fung's little brother
Patrick Dunn	Hong Siu-Hong 康兆雄	Hong Yu-Pak and Hong Yu-Fung's father Zhuang Mei-Lin's husband
Rosanne Lui	Jong Mei-Lum 莊美琳	Hong Yu-Pak and Hong Yu-Fung's mother Hong Yiu-wei's wife

=== Other cast ===
Cast	Role	Description
Mat Yeung	Marcus Lo 盧彥斌	Fund Manager liked Yu-Fung and Vincci; Vincci's boyfriend, later broke up Villain
Ram Chiang	Lo Man Kit	Head of Tracing Department
KK Cheung	楊佑銘	Judge; Yik-Him and Sam's father

== Viewership ratings ==
The following is a table that includes a list of the total ratings points based on television viewership.

Week	Originally Aired	Episodes	Average Points	Peaking Points	References
1	18–21 December 2012	1 — 4	26	29	
2	24–28 December 2012	5 — 9	25	28	
3	31 December 2012 - 4 January 2013	10 — 14	26	29	
4	7–11 January 2013	15 — 20	27	32	
4	January 11, 2013	19 — 20	29	32	
