= Doris Chow =

Hong Kong film actress

- 周麗欣
- Born: October 1, 1984 (age 41); British Hong Kong

Doris Chow Lai-yan (Chinese: 周麗欣, born 1 October 1984) is a Hong Kong actress, currently a contract artist at Television Broadcasts Limited (TVB). She has appeared in numerous television series and auditioned for the 2007 Miss Hong Kong Pageant. After failing to win, she played the role of Strawberry, the flavor angel, on the TVB food program Foodie 2 Shoes. In 2011, she formed the girl group Lacee Lacey with Helen Lam, Chloe Nguyen, Yong Law and Wesley Jasie Ho, but the group disbanded before releasing any albums. In 2014, she also performed on the TVB game show High D and gained fame.

Before joining Foodie 2 Shoes as a flavor angel, Chow had actually acted in films, stage plays and worked as a model.

== Filmography ==
=== TV series (TVB) ===
首播	劇名	角色
2008	The Money-Maker Recipe	Journalist
2009	Off Pedder	傳銷員（EP115）、珠寶店店員（EP157）、禮物小姐（EP255）
2009	The King of Snooker	雷建衝fans（EP15）
2009	The Threshold of a Persona	Susan（花店助理）
2009	Burning Flame III	孝女（EP12）
2009	A Bride for a Ride	冬梅
2009	You're Hired	空姐（EP1）
2009	In the Chamber of Bliss	妓女
2009	The Beauty of the Game	女明星
2010	Off Pedder	店員（EP313）
2010	My Better Half	Nurse
2010	The Comeback Clan	空姐
2010	In the Eye of the Beholder	小蘭
2010	Suspects in Love	學員
2010	OL Supreme	婚紗店職員
2010	Fly With Me	護士／簡明軒舊女友
2010	天天天晴	待從／林新宜／嘉賓
2010	談情說案	鄭晶晶（Janet）
2010	情越雙白線	女乘客
2010	公主嫁到	小竹
2010	讀心神探	少女
2010	刑警	Doris
2010	誘情轉駁	Olive
2011年	隔離七日情	記者
2011年	依家有喜	Kitty
2011年	魚躍在花見	助手
2011年	Only You 只有您	Becky
2011年	點解阿Sir係阿Sir	楊梓晴
2011年	誰家灶頭無煙火	Elaine
2011年	怒火街頭	法庭書記
2011年	花花世界花家姐	秘書
2011年	團圓	婚紗店顧客
2011年	真相	主播
2011年	紫禁驚雷	昌妻
2011年	不速之約	靚護士
2011年	荃加福祿壽探案	護士
2011年	法證先鋒III	Mary
2011年	萬凰之王	後宮妃子
2011年	天與地	護士
2012年	缺宅男女	店員
2012年	心戰	酒客
2012年	飛虎	CID（第6集）
2012年-2014年	愛·回家 (第一輯)	店員（第170、219集）、Tea（第254集）、Gabe
2013年	神鎗狙擊	Emma（第2集）
2013年	法外風雲	𡃁模
2013年	On Call 36小時II	蕭以利
2013年	My盛Lady	單身女子
2013年	貓屎媽媽	蘇眉好友
2014年	愛我請留言	中環OL
2014年	點金勝手	Suki
2014年	使徒行者	何韻瑩
2014年	我們的天空	睇樓婦（第12集）
2014年	醋娘子	荷花
2015年	八卦神探	營友（第13-14集）
2015年	四個女仔三個BAR	Candy
2015年	華麗轉身	按摩師
2015年	樓奴	楊茵
2015年	無雙譜	夫人
2015年	東坡家事	女觀眾
2015年	實習天使	葉梓琪
2016年	鐵馬戰車	花店店員
2016年	公公出宮	虹
2016年	警犬巴打	女經理人
2016年	潮流教主	文秘書
2016年	末代御醫	孕婦
2016年	EU超時任務	CID
2016年	愛·回家之八時入席	Doris（第15、74集）、護士（第174-175集）
2016年	火線下的江湖大佬	Doris
2016年	殭	Raymond女友（第24集）
2016年	一屋老友記	Jenny（第13集）
2016年	完美叛侶	嘉嘉（第16集）
2016年	城寨英雄	黃花雀
2016年	超能老豆	母親（第13集）
2016年	律政強人	夏婷
2016年	幕後玩家	名媛
2017年至今	愛·回家之開心速遞	Natalie之朋友（第37集） 酒吧女（第69集） 秀女（第70集） Lucy（第91、94、177集） 店員 婉婉姐（第1997、2068集） Boo姐（第2243集）
2017年	味想天開	春桃
2017年	乘勝狙擊	曾翠珊
2017年	與諜同謀	仁家姐
2017年	我瞞結婚了	祝綺薇
2017年	全職沒女	OL
2017年	心理追兇 Mind Hunter	莊小麗
2017年	不懂撒嬌的女人	Venus
2017年	超時空男臣	姚善詩(Ceci)
2017年	踩過界	鍾彥芝
2017年	使徒行者2	堂女郎
2017年	老表，畢業喇!	司儀
2017年	雜警奇兵	童軍領袖
2017年	降魔的	護士
2017年	溏心風暴3	Yvonne
2017年	誇世代	梁芷君
2017年	性在有情	張莉芝
2018年	三個女人一個「因」	利東優
2018年	波士早晨	歌手
2018年	翻生武林	村民
2018年	棟仁的時光	鋼管舞學生
2018年	BB來了	梁太 (Ellen)
2018年	特技人	Alice
2018年	跳躍生命線	璋妻
2018年	大帥哥	阿娣
2019年	福爾摩師奶	女犯人
2019年	廉政行動2019	余天一妻
2019年	婚姻合伙人	馬麗
2019年	白色強人	馬穎芝（Paula）
2019年	她她她的少女時代	學員
2019年	金宵大廈	林若思母親
2019年	牛下女高音	瑜伽導師
2019年	解決師	Miss Lee
2019年	多功能老婆	Doris
2020年	丫鬟大聯盟	半仙丫鬟
2020年	黃金有罪	馬騮嫂
2020年	法證先鋒IV	拐子婆
2020年	機場特警	俊母
2020年	降魔的2.0	村民
2020年	殺手	兔女郎
2020年	殺手	侍應
2020年	那些我愛過的人	女賓客
2020年	迷網	蔡淑娥
2020年	反黑路人甲	趙美寶
2020年	C9特工	黃太
2020年	木棘証人	心理醫生
2020年	香港愛情故事	Amy
2021年	愛美麗狂想曲	職員
2021年	伙記辦大事	溫妮莎（Vanessa）
2021年	逆天奇案	Mary
2021年	寶寶大過天	老師
2021年	欺詐劇團	老師
2021年	七公主	麥佩賢
2021年	把關者們	Yvonne
2021年	我家無難事	司儀（第11集）、記者（第12集）
2021年	星空下的仁醫	暉母
2021年	換命真相	精品店店主
2021年	異搜店	護士
2021年	愛上我的衰神	伍惠怡
2022年	鐵拳英雄	丁細鳳（青年）
2022年	金宵大廈2	女護士
2022年	食腦喪B	俞善知
2022年	雙生陌生人	護士
2022年	十八年後的終極告白2.0	網台主持人
2022年	童時愛上你	護士（第14集）、店員（第18集）
2022年	白色強人II	馬穎芝（Paula）
2022年	凶宅清潔師（J2首播）	心理醫生
2022年	輕·功	申美英
2022年	有種好男人	周明娟
2023年	新四十二章	Mary
2023年	法言人	宋太
2023年	隱門	月同學
2023年	靈戲逼人	美蘭
2023年	破毒強人	徐曉蕾（Rita）
2023年	你好，我的大夫	蘇敏嫣
2024年	旁觀者	舜茜
2024年	再見·枕邊人	黎太
2024年	逆天奇案2	Mary
2024年	神耆小子	淑嫻
2024年	巾幗梟雄之懸崖	徐娟
2024年	黑色月光	雷婧之
2025年	富貴千團	學員
2025年	奪命提示	趙嫦娥（青年）
2025年	虛擬情人	Mona
2025年	刑偵12	王珊珊（青年）
2025年	巨塔之-{后}-	林玉寧
2025年	金式森林	鄺偉樑女伴
未播映	非常檢控觀	
