= Mimi Lo =

Hong Kong singer (born 1974)

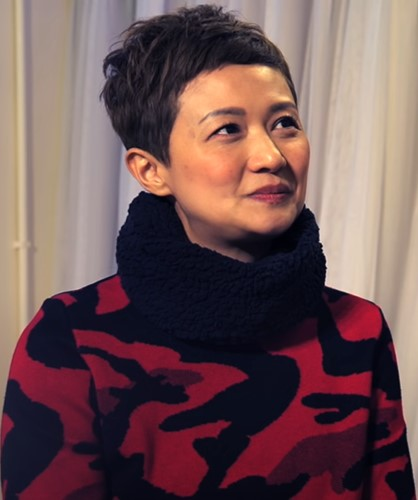
- Lo appeared in a video produced by the YouTube channel "JMKTV" in February 2018.
- Born: 30 December 1974 (age 51); Hong Kong
- Occupations: Singer; actor; TV presenter; DJ
- Years active: 1995–present
- Spouse: Power Chan (m. 2009)

Chinese name
- Traditional Chinese: 羅敏莊
- Simplified Chinese: 罗敏庄
Transcriptions
Standard Mandarin
- Hanyu Pinyin: Luó Mǐnzhuāng
Yue: Cantonese
- Jyutping: Lo4 Man5 Zong1
- Musical career
- Also known as: Mia Lo
- Origin: Hong Kong
- Genres: Cantopop, jazz
- Labels: New Century Workshop (2009–present); Rock in Records (2003–2009); Warner Music (1995–1997)
- Website: mimilo.net

Mimi Lo Man-chong (born 30 December 1974), is a cantopop singer, actress, and radio DJ, having released 11 studio albums and appearing in numerous films, television dramas and stage productions, currently affiliated with TVB in Hong Kong.

== Biography ==
=== Early singing career ===
Lo was signed to Warner Music Hong Kong in 1995 and released her debut EP and studio album, which brought her immediate attention in the music industry with her breakthrough hit and signature song, "挑戰者 The Challenger". She won the silver award for Most Promising Newcomer at the 1995 Ultimate Song Chart Awards Presentation.

However, with personnel issues at Warner Music in 1996, her second album was delayed indefinitely. It was finally released in 1997 with little promotion and was a commercial failure. She was then dropped by Warner Music Hong Kong. Subsequently, Lo asked to be released from her management contract at Music Sense. However, a clause in the contract restricted her from appearing in any public performances for three years and forced her into hiatus. At this time, her radio DJ friends invited her to work at Radio Television Hong Kong behind the scenes as a receptionist and secretary until her contract restriction was over. During this 3-year hiatus, Lo admitted to suffering from depression as a result of the turmoil.

=== Post hiatus ===
In 2002, Lo signed with Hong Kong television station TVB and began her full-time acting career. She also became a radio DJ at Radio Television Hong Kong's RTHK 2 station. In 2003, she signed with local independent record label, Rock in Records and began recording cover versions of Cantonese, Mandarin and English songs to be released as cover albums in Super Audio CD format for audiophiles. Due to the Hong Kong audiophile market being a relatively niche market plus the fact that Lo had turned into a full-time actress, her singer status was slowly forgotten by the Hong Kong public.

=== Career resurgence ===
In 2010, Lo appeared in an episode of the singing competition The Voice when contestant Penny Chan asked her to perform a duet with him during a round of competition. He chose her power ballad signature song, "挑戰者 The Challenger". Her flawless rendition of the song garnered universal praise. Judge Anthony Lun mentioned during his critique, "I wish there are more singers in Hong Kong like Mimi." Upon hearing this, Lo broke into tears. Lo then went on to thank the contestant for choosing her and her song as no one has sung her songs in 15 years. Host Sammy Leung then asked the audience to go pick Lo's songs to sing at karaoke.

Her performance on the show sparked public interest in her past singing career on Hong Kong's media forums. Upon airing of the episode, "挑戰者 The Challenger" hit number six on popular Hong Kong karaoke chain KKBox's song chart on 1 July 2010. Lo suddenly found herself in the spotlight once again with media attention and newfound fans to her music. She was asked by TVB to co-host its long-time running music program, Jade Solid Gold with MC Jin starting 23 July 2010. She also released her compilation album, Very Meaningful with songs from her days at Warner Music in August 2010. Included is a re-recording of "挑戰者 The Challenger" as a bonus single. The album hit number 3 on YesAsia's sales chart on 30 August 2010.

=== Personal life ===
Lo married actor Power Chan in December 2009 after dating for seven years. In an interview, Lo stated that her husband did not know her as a singer when he first met her, only as an actress.

== Discography ==
=== Albums ===
Year	Title	English Translation	Album type	Label	Notes
1995	心軟	Tender-Hearted	Studio EP	Warner Music	credited as Mia Lo
1996	一生也在等...	Waiting My Whole Life...	Studio album	Warner Music	credited as Mia Lo
1997	一顆恨嫁的心	A Marriage-Hungry Heart	Studio album	Warner Music	credited as Mia Lo
2003	Mimi Lo 羅敏莊	Mimi Lo	Cover album	Rock in Records	Audiophile SACD release
2004	這一曲送給你	This Song Is for You	Cover album	Rock in Records	Audiophile SACD release
2006	都市戀曲	Urban Love Songs	Cover album	Rock in Records	Audiophile SACD release
2007	You're My Everything		Cover album	Rock in Records	Audiophile SACD release
2008	Very Personal		Cover album	Rock in Records	Audiophile SACD release
2009	羅敏莊發燒精選	Mimi Lo Hi-Fi Collection	Cover compilation album	Rock in Records	Audiophile SACD release
2009	楓戀蜜語	Maple Love, Sweet Words	Cover album	New Century Workshop	Audiophile SACD release
2010	Very Meaningful		Compilation album	New Century Workshop	
2012	我做到	I Did It	Studio album	New Century Workshop	

== Filmography ==
=== Motion pictures ===
- 1997 夜半2點鐘 2:00 am

=== Television ===
- 1998 西遊記（貳） Journey to the West II (TVB)
- 2002 雲海玉弓緣 Lofty Waters Verdant Bow (TVB)
- 2004 烽火奇遇結良緣 Lady Fan (TVB)
- 2004 血薦軒轅 Blade Heart (TVB)
- 2004 一屋兩家三姓人 A Handful of Love (TVB)
- 2004 天涯俠醫 The Last Breakthrough (TVB)
- 2006 覆雨翻雲 Lethal Weapons of Love and Passion (TVB)
- 2006 天幕下的戀人 Under the Canopy of Love (TVB)
- 2006 轉世驚情 The Battle Against Evil (TVB)
- 2007 蕭十一郎 Treasure Raiders (TVB)
- 2007 天機算 A Change of Destiny (TVB)
- 2007 緣來自有機 The Green Grass of Home (TVB)
- 2007 兩妻時代 Marriage of Inconvenience (TVB)
- 2008 野蠻奶奶大戰戈師奶 War of In-Laws II (Cameo role) (TVB)
- 2008 古靈精探 D.I.E. (TVB)
- 2008 尖子攻略 Your Class or Mine (TVB)
- 2009 大冬瓜 The Winter Melon Tale (TVB)
- 2009 古靈精探B D.I.E. Again (TVB)
- 2009 美麗高解像 The Beauty of the Game (TVB)
- 2010 五味人生 The Season of Fate (TVB)
- 2010 情人眼裏高一D Don Juan DeMercado (TVB)
- 2010 老公萬歲 My Better Half (TVB)
- 2011 隔離七日情 7 Days in Life (TVB)

=== Television (as presenter) ===
- 2010–present 勁歌金曲 Jade Solid Gold (TVB)
- 2010 超級巨聲 The Voice (TVB) – guest presenter (Season 2, Episodes 13–14)
- 2005 東張西望 Scoop (TVB)
- 2001 K-100 (TVB)

=== Radio host ===
- Made in Hong Kong 李志剛 (Made in Hong Kong Lee Chi Kwong) (RTHK 2)
- 人間定格 Happy Hour (People Freeze Frame Happy Hour) (RTHK 2)
- 瘋 Show 快活人 (Crazy Show Happy People) (RTHK 2)
- 倫住嚟試 (Trying One By One) (RTHK 2)

== Awards and nominations ==
Year	Award	Category	For	Result	Notes
1995	1995 Ultimate Song Chart Awards Presentation	Most Promising Newcomer Award		Won	Silver Award
2007	TVB Anniversary Awards (2007)	Best Supporting Actress	A Change of Destiny	Nominated	
2010	TVB Anniversary Awards (2010)	Most Improved Female Artist	The Beauty of the Game, The Season of Fate, Don Juan DeMercado, My Better Half, Jade Solid Gold	Nominated	
