= Very Meaningful =

Greatest hits album by Mimi Lo
- Released: August 29, 2010
- Recorded: 1995–2010
- Genre: Cantopop
- Label: New Century Workshop
- Producer: Tony Arevelo Jr.

Mimi Lo chronology
Maple Love, Sweet Words 楓戀蜜語 (2009)	Very Meaningful (2010)

Very Meaningful is a greatest hits compilation album by cantopop singer Mimi Lo.

== Album release ==
Due to Lo's recent career resurgence from appearing on The Voice, New Century Workshop decided to release this compilation spanning her hits from her Warner Music era from the mid-nineties, and songs from stage productions that Lo that was part of. The initial batch contained a serial numbered bonus CD single of Lo's signature song, "挑戰者 The Challenger" that she re-recorded. The compilation was released on August 29, 2010, in Hong Kong.

Upon its release, the album hit number 3 on Yesasia's sales chart on August 30, 2010.

== Track listing ==
1. 挑戰者 (The Challenger)
2. 兄弟 (Brothers)
3. 心軟 (Tender-Hearted)
4. 一生也在等 [愛我的人] (Waiting My Whole Life [For the One Who Loves Me])
5. 愛妳一萬年 (Loving You For Ten Thousand Years)
6. 迷失森林 (Lost Forest)
7. 天堂的風箏 (Kite in the Heavens)
8. Goodbye My Friend
9. 只有祢 永恆的主 (Only You, Forever God)
10. 重新點起我生命 (Re-Igniting My Life) (Cantonese version of "You Raise Me Up")

Limited Edition CD single

1. 挑戰者 (The Challenger) [2010 Re-recorded Version]
