= List of Yes, Sir. Sorry, Sir! characters =

Yes, Sir. Sorry, Sir! is a television drama produced by TVB.

== Qiqihar Association Lam Tin Kwong Memorial Secondary School ==
=== Teaching Staff ===
| Cast | Role | Description |
|---|---|---|
| Lee Hung-kit | Tam Siu Hing 譚紹興 | Supervisor; Honorary member of Hong Kong Police Anti-Crime Committee |
| Joseph Lee | Ko Sun 高新 | Age 57; Principal |
| Yeung Ying-wai | Mo Yau Lim 毛孝廉 | Vice-principal |
| Moses Chan | Law Yiu Wah 羅耀華 | Age 35; Law Sir; A Chinese Language teacher 5C class teacher An undercover cop disguised as a school teacher Koo Ka Lam's boyfriend, finally broke up Loved Ho Miu Suet, later her boyfriend Ching Man Lik's love rival |
| Tavia Yeung | Ho Miu Suet 何妙雪 | Age 27; Miss Ho; A General Studies and Physical Education teacher Law Yiu Wah and Ching Man Lik's love interest Law Yiu Wah's girlfriend Koo Ka Lam's love rival |
| Linda Chung | Koo Ka Lam, Carman 古嘉嵐 | Age 25; Miss Koo; A bowling coach Law Yiu Wah's girlfriend, finally broke up Ho Miu Suet's love rival |
| Kwong Chor-fai | Lo Ping Chan 勞炳燦 | Lo Sir |
| Mandy Lam | Chan Mei Mei 陳美美 | Miss Chan Chan; A Chinese History teacher |
| Candy Chu | Lee Heung Sin 李向善 | Miss Lee |
| Lam Ying-hung | So Pik Lai 蘇碧麗 | Miss So |
| Cheung Tat-lun | Lok Cheuk Man 駱卓文 | Lok Sir |
| Ho Wai-yip | Chu Wing Kuen 朱永權 | Chu Sir |
| Ron Ng | Ching Man Lik, Nick 程文力 | Age 30; Ching Sir; Serious Crime Bureau Inspector; Director of Community Relations School; Loved Ho Miu Suet; Law Yiu Wah's love rival Transferred to CID in Episode 19 |
| Stephen Wong Ka-lok | Kong Tung Leung 江棟樑 | Kong Sir; Director of Community Relations School, to replace Ching Man Lik; Transferred to disciplined forces in Episode 30 |
| Rachel Kan | Miss Yu | A bowling coach, to replace Koo Ka Lam |
| Yu Tsz-ming | Lo Sir | A Chinese Language teacher, to replace Law Yiu Wah |
| Mok Wai-man | Uncle Tat 達叔 | A janitor |

=== Class 5C ===
| Cast | Role | Description |
|---|---|---|
| Law Kwan-moon | Cheung Pak Chuen 張柏全 | A student Leader of "Killer-4"; Member of Bowling Team; Pointed against Law Yiu Wah and Chiang Chun, but later made up Bullied Chu Tin Yan |
| Chu Man-hon | Mok Chak Kei 莫澤基 | A student A drug addict Member of "Killer-4"; Member of Bowling Team; Pointed against Law Yiu Wah and Chiang Chun, but later made up Bullied Chu Tin Yan |
| Wong Tak-san | Fan Tai 范泰 | A student Member of "Killer-4"; Member of Bowling Team; Pointed against Law Yiu Wah and Chiang Chun, but later made up Bullied Chu Tin Yan |
| Cilla Kung | Chung Ka Bo, Bowie 鍾嘉寶 | A student A "part-time" prostitute Member of "Killer-4"; Leader of Bowling Team; Fung On Dik's ex-girlfriend Pointed against Law Yiu Wah and Chiang Chun, but later made up Bullied Chu Tin Yan |
| Calvin Chan | Chiang Chun 蔣進 | A transfer student Member of Bowling Team; Member of a triad society "Tung Sing"; Chiang Hung's son Pointed against Cheung Pak Chuen, Mok Chak Kei, Fai Tai, Chung Ka Bo, but later made up Pointed against Yau Ho-cheung |
| Sham Oi-lam | Tong Sze-nga 唐思雅 | A student Cheung Man Kit's girlfriend |
| Yeung Chiu Hoi | Ng Ka Yi 伍家義 | Helped Law Yiu Wah to collect school's secret information |
| Leo Lee | Chu Tin Yan 朱天恩 | Bullied by Cheung Pak Chuen, Mok Chak Kei, Fan Tai, Chung Ka Bo |

== Law Family ==
| Cast | Role | Description |
|---|---|---|
| Chow Chung | Law Chun Pong 羅振邦 | A retired soldier Law Tai Kwai's uncle Cheung Yuen Ngor's father-in-law Choi Kiu's uncle-in-law Law Yiu Wah's grandfather Law Yiu Cho's granduncle |
| Ching Hor-wai | Cheung Yuen Ngor 張婉娥 | Suffered from brain stroke Law Chun Pong's daughter-in-law Law Yiu Wah's mother Deceased in Episode 1 |
| Peter Lai | Law Tai Kwai 羅大貴 | Law Chun Pong's nephew Law Yiu Cho's father Law Yiu Wah's uncle |
| Lily Li | Choi Kiu 蔡嬌 | Law Chun Pong's niece-in-law Law Tai Kwai's wife Law Yiu Cho's mother Law Yiu Wah's aunt |
| Moses Chan | Law Yiu Wah 羅耀華 | Law Sir; A Chinese teacher An undercover cop disguised as a school teacher Law Chun Pong's grandson Law Tai Kwai and Choi Kiu's nephew Law Yiu Cho's cousin Ho Miu Suet and Koo Ka Lam's boyfriend, finally broke up Ching Man Lik's love rival |
| Jones Lee | Law Yiu Cho, Joe 羅耀祖 | Law Chung Pong's grandnephew Law Tai Kwai and Choi Kiu's son Law Yiu Wah's cousin |

== Ho Family ==
| Cast | Role | Description |
|---|---|---|
| Jason Lau | Ho Nin Fat 何年發 | A retired restaurant cook Fong Choi Fun's husband Ho Miu Suet and Ho Yat Sing's father Yeung Tsz Ching's father-in-law |
| Alice Fung So-bor | Fong Choi Fun 方彩芬 | Ho Nin Fat's wife Ho Miu Suet and Ho Yat Sing's mother Yeung Tsz Ching's mother-in-law |
| Tavia Yeung | Ho Miu Suet 何妙雪 | Ho Nin Fat and Fong Choi Fun's daughter Ho Yat Sing's sister Law Yiu Wah's girlfriend, finally broke up |
| Cheung Wing Hong | Ho Yat Sing 何日昇 | Ho Nin Fat and Fong Choi Fun's son Ho Miu Suet's brother Yeung Tsz Ching's husband |
| Doris Chow | Yeung Tsz Ching 楊梓晴 | Ho Nin Fat and Fong Choi Fun's daughter-in-law Ho Yat Sing's wife |

== Yau Family ==
| Cast | Role | Description |
|---|---|---|
| Ko Chun-man | Yau Chi-kit 游志傑 | Ching Man Sze's husband Yau Ho-cheung's father |
| Wendy Hon | Ching Man Sze 程文詩 | A solicitor Yau Chi-kit's wife Ching Man Lik's sister Yau Ho-cheung's mother |
| Ron Ng | Ching Man Lik, Nick 程文力 | Ching Man Sze's brother Yau Ho-cheung's uncle Yuen Wing Yan's boyfriend, but broke up in Episode 16 |
| Max Choi | Yau Ho-cheung, Andrew 游浩翔 | A student of Ko But College; A drug addict Yau Chi-kit and Ching Man Sze's son Ching Man Lik's nephew Pointed against Chiang Chun |

== Koo Family ==
| Cast | Role | Description |
|---|---|---|
| Yu Yang | Koo To Yeung 古道洋 | Tung Sau Lan's husband Koo Ka Sin and Koo Ka Lam's father Ngai Fung's father-in-law |
| Angelina Lo | Tung Sau Lan 董秀蘭 | Koo To Yeung's wife Koo Ka Sin and Koo Ka Lam's mother Ngai Fung's mother-in-law |
| Savio Tsang | Ngai Fung, Charles 倪鋒 | Age 40; A triad leader Koo To Yeung and Tung Sau Lan's son-in-law Koo Ka Sin's husband Koo Ka Lam's brother-in-law Beaten by drug youngsters into paralysis and mental disorder in Episode 30 (Main villain) |
| Queenie Chu | Koo Ka Sin, Ceci 古嘉倩 | Ngai Fung's wife Koo Ka Lam's sister Assisted Ngai Fung to manage Chun Hing Triad; Imprisoned in Episode 28 (Semi-Villain) |
| Linda Chung | Koo Ka Lam, Carmen 古嘉嵐 | Koo Ka Sin's sister Ngai Fung's sister-in-law |

== CID ==
| Cast | Role | Description |
|---|---|---|
| Ram Chiang | Poon Kwok Shing 潘國誠 | A superintendent Law Yiu Wah's supervisor |
| Sin Ho-ying | Wong Cham Kwan 黃湛堃 | A superintendent Ching Man Lik, Lee Cheuk Ho, Chan Shek, Kong Tung Leung's supervisor |
| Tai Chi-wai | Cho Wing Yan 曹永仁 | A superintendent Ching Man Lik's ex-subordinate Knocked down by a car by triad members and seriously injured, and finally resigned |
| Ron Ng | Ching Man Lik 程文力 | An inspector Wong Cham Kwan's subordinate Lee Cheuk Ho, Chan Shek, Kong Tung Leung's supervisor |
| Moses Chan | Law Yiu Wah 羅耀華 | An undercover Poon Kwok Shing's subordinate |
| Henry Lee | Lee Cheuk Ho 李卓豪 | An officer Ching Man Lik's subordinate |
| Lee Kai-kit | Chan Shek 陳碩 | An officer Ching Man Lik's subordinate |
| Stephen Wong Ka-lok | Kong Tung Leung, Mountain 江棟樑 | An officer Ching Man Lik's subordinate |
| Kau Cheuk-nang | Wong Tsz Tong 王之堂 | An officer Ching Man Lik's subordinate |
| Casper Chan | Yuen Sau Wai 阮秀慧 | An officer |
| Jack Wu | Yam Tak Kwong 任德廣 | An officer |

== "Chun Hing" Triad Society ==
| Cast | Role | Description |
|---|---|---|
| Savio Tsang | Ngai Fung, Charles 倪鋒 | A triad leader Shing Sai Long, Ho Chit Shun, Glasses Fu, Little Hammer, Biscuit, Stanley Yip's leader Beaten by drug youngsters into paralysis and mental disorder in Episode 30 (Main villain) |
| Queenie Chu | Koo Ka-sin 古嘉倩 | Ngai Fung's wife Assisted Ngai Fung to manage Chun Hing Triad; Imprisoned in Episode 28 (Villain) |
| Eric Li | Shing Sai Long 盛世龍 | A triad member Ngai Fung's subordinate Glasses Fu's leader Arrested in Episode 27 (Main villain) |
| Bond Chan | Ho Chit Shun, Terrence 賀哲信 | A triad member Ngai Fung's subordinate, later broke up (Villain) |
| Daniel Kwok | Glasses Fu 眼鏡富 | A triad member Shing Sai Long's subordinate, later broke up with Ngai Fung; Arrested by police in Episode 20 (Villain) |
| Yeung Ching Wah | Little Hammer 鎚仔 | A triad member Glasses Fu's subordinate (Villain) |
| Dai Yiu Ming | Biscuit 餅乾 | A triad member Glasses Fu's subordinate (Villain) |
| Joseph Yeung | Stanley Yip | Ngai Fung's legal consul (Villain) |

== Others ==
| Cast | Role | Description |
|---|---|---|
| Law Lok Lam | Chiang Hung 蔣洪 | Age 55; A businessman A former leader of a triad society "Tung Sing"; Chiang Chun's father |
| Jess Shum | Yuen Wing Yan, Michelle 袁穎欣 | Ching Man Lik's girlfriend, but broke up in Episode 16 |
| Lui Hei | Fung On Dik, Eddie 馮安迪 | Winsor Secondary School student Chung Ka Po's ex-boyfriend |
| Fred Cheng | Cheung Hau Ming 張孝明 | A student Used by Chun Hing Triad to smuggle drugs Sentenced to correctional services centre in Episode 11 |
| Kenneth Ma | Jack | Koo Ka Lam's boyfriend A single father Appeared in Episode 30 |
| Skye Chan | Macy | Ching Man Lik's girlfriend Appeared in Episode 30 |

== See also ==
- Yes, Sir. Sorry, Sir!
