= Survivor's Law II =

- Poster
- 律政新人王II
- Genre: Modern Drama
- Starring: Sammul Chan; Kenneth Ma; Ella Koon; Selena Li; Rebecca Chan; Waise Lee; Power Chan
- Opening theme: "Choose Me" (選擇我) by Kenneth Ma
- Country of origin: Hong Kong
- Original language: Cantonese
- No. of episodes: 20

Production
- Producer: TVB
- Running time: 45 minutes

Original release
- Network: TVB Jade
- Release: December 24, 2007 – January 18, 2008

Related
- Survivor's Law

Survivor's Law II (Traditional Chinese: 律政新人王II) is a 20-episode TVB drama broadcast between December 2007 and January and January 2008. It is the direct sequel to 2003's Survivor's Law (律政新人王). The main cast features Sammul Chan from the original series with the new addition of Kenneth Ma and Ella Koon.

== Synopsis ==
"Equal Just Under Law"
It isn't slanted by prejudice or bias of any kind

MK Sun Man-Kwan (Kenneth Ma) was once stopping a drug smuggler, but because of that, he was wrongly accused of taking drugs. Despite his background, he hired a famous lawyer to help him, and not surprisingly, he won. The lawyer, Brandon (Waise Lee), became his idol, and MK Sun grew up to be a lawyer.

Years later, MK was trying to get a job in his idols company, TB&B. He beats Brandon's wife, Brenda (Rebecca Chan), in a case, and started working there. There he meets a stubborn, rich, and spoiled girl named Lily, (Ella Koon) only caring about her looks and herself. They became enemies because of each other's backgrounds and attitudes.

MK Sun then meets Vincent (Sammul Chan). Vincent thought of MK Sun as ghetto, but soon realizes he was wrong. After having a fight with him in soccer, and Vincent punched the umpire, MK Sun took the blame. Soon, they became best friends.

After splitting with his former girlfriend, Jessica (Bernice Liu), Vincent falls in love with a coffee shop girl called Cheng Choi-Yuk (Selena Li). Vincent had his license for being a lawyer taken away for three years and couldn't get his license back yet. After getting a chance to work again and start a new refreshing career, he started only caring for himself. He was so determined that he went against Choi-Yuk and her family, even his best friend, MK Sun. Choi-Yuk thought he betrayed them and only cared about himself so she ended the relationship.

In a court case, MK finally confesses of his love to Lily, but she didn't like him back because of his background. But after MK jumped into the sea (to swim back to get to a court case) and ended up in the hospital, she started to like him. During the court case over Bo-Bo's custody she proposed to him and asked for custody, which they got, and they eventually got married in court.

Soon, Choi-Yuk gets into hospital after taking a beating in the head, falls into a coma, and gives birth to a baby boy named Jophy. Vincent, while trying to uncover Noel and her previous crimes, smashes his head to a drawer while avoiding a knife. While Choi-Yuk just woke back up and waiting for Vincent to return, she sees Vincent in a stretcher. She hurried there with Jophy and thought they could finally be a happy family, but Vincent does not recognize her, having received a big blow to the head and is suffering amnesia.

However, to prevent Choi-Yuk from despairing too much from not remembering her and Jophy, he promises that some day he will propose to her and they will get married. He never regains his memory and ends up working at the cake shop with Choi-Yuk. MK and Lily share a sweet and happy relationship.

== Cast ==
=== Law firm ===
| Cast | Role | Description |
|---|---|---|
| Waise Lee | Tsui Ching-Ping (Brandon) 崔正平 | Lawyer; Brenda's husband MK's mentor |
| Rebecca Chan | Chin Siu-Haam (Brenda) 錢韶涵 | Lawyer; Brandon's wife MK's mentor |
| Sammul Chan | Cheuk Wai-Ming (Vincent) 卓偉名 | Lawyer; Cheng Choi-Yuk's boyfriend Jessica's ex-boyfriend |
| Candy Chu | Chow Siu-Yin 周小燕 | Firm employee |
| Lee Cheuk Ling (李焯寧) | Tung Bing-Bing 董冰冰 | Firm employee |
| Meini Cheung (張美妮) | Cheung Mei-Sin (Cindy) 張美倩 | Firm employee |

=== Sun family ===
| Cast | Role | Description |
|---|---|---|
| Alice Fung So-bor | Pak Mei 白薇 | Sun Man-Kam and MK's grandmother |
| Power Chan | Sun Man-Kam 辛萬金 | MK's older brother Ting Lai-Na's husband |
| Kenneth Ma | Sun Man-Kwan (MK Sun) 辛萬軍 | Lawyer; Sun Man-Kam's younger brother Lily's boyfriend then husband |
| Sai Tik Kei (冼迪琦) | Sun Ka-Bo 辛家寶 | MK's ex-girlfriend's daughter |

=== Suen family ===
| Cast | Role | Description |
|---|---|---|
| Kwok Fung (郭峰) | Suen Pak-To 孫伯滔 | Real estate developer Lily's father |
| Ella Koon | Suen Lei-Lei (Lily) 孫俐俐 | Lawyer; MK's girlfriend then wife |
| Queenie Chu | Kan Ming-Wai (Noel) 簡明慧 | Lily's friend Suen Pak-To's assistant and girlfriend |

=== Cheng family ===
| Cast | Role | Description |
|---|---|---|
| Wong Ching (王青) | Cheng Kam-Tong 鄭錦棠 | Cheng Choi-Yuk's father |
| Pak Yan (白茵) | Chu Suk-Ho 朱淑好 | Cheng Choi Yuk's mother |
| Selena Li | Cheng Choi-Yuk 鄭彩玉 | Coffee shop waitress/pastry chef Vincent's girlfriend |

=== Miscellaneous ===
| Cast | Role | Description |
|---|---|---|
| June Chan (陳琪) | Ting Lai-Na 丁麗娜 | Sun Man-Kam's wife |
| Joel Chan (陳山聰) | Pat Ching-Yee 畢正義 | – |
| Chiu Wing Hung (趙永洪) | William | Suen Pak-To's assistant |
| Ngo Ka-nin | Fan Tsan-Ting 范振庭 | Lawyer; Lily's ex-boyfriend |
| Daniel Kwok (郭卓樺) | Ip Chi-Hoi 葉志開 | MK's friend |
| Russell Cheung (張智軒) | Cheng Chi-Ko (Marco) 鄭志高 | MK's friend |
| Oscar Chan (陳堃) | Tai Kin-Wai 戴健威 | MK's friend |
| Cheuk Chi | Yuet 月 | Tai Kin-Wai's girlfriend |
| Wu Fung (Guest star) | Puen Wing-Leung 潘永良 | Lawyer; Brandon's mentor |
| Bernice Liu (Guest star) | Chiang Si-Ka (Jessica) 蔣思嘉 | Lawyer; Vincent's ex-girlfriend |

== Viewership ratings ==
| Week | | Episode | Average Points | Peaking Points | References |
|---|---|---|---|---|---|
| 1 | December 24, 2007 - December 28, 2007 | 1—5 | 26 | — | |
| 2 | January 1–4, 2008 | 6—9 | 29 | 31 | |
| 3 | January 7–11, 2008 | 10—14 | 31 | 33 | |
| 4 | January 14–18, 2008 | 15—20 | 31 | 37 | |

== Awards and nominations ==
41st TVB Anniversary Awards (2008)

- "Best Drama"
- "Best Actor in a Leading Role" (Kenneth Ma - MK Sun Man-Kwan)
- "My Favourite Male Character" (Kenneth Ma - MK Sun Man-Kwan)
