= Kingdom Yuen =

Hong Kong actress

- 苑瓊丹
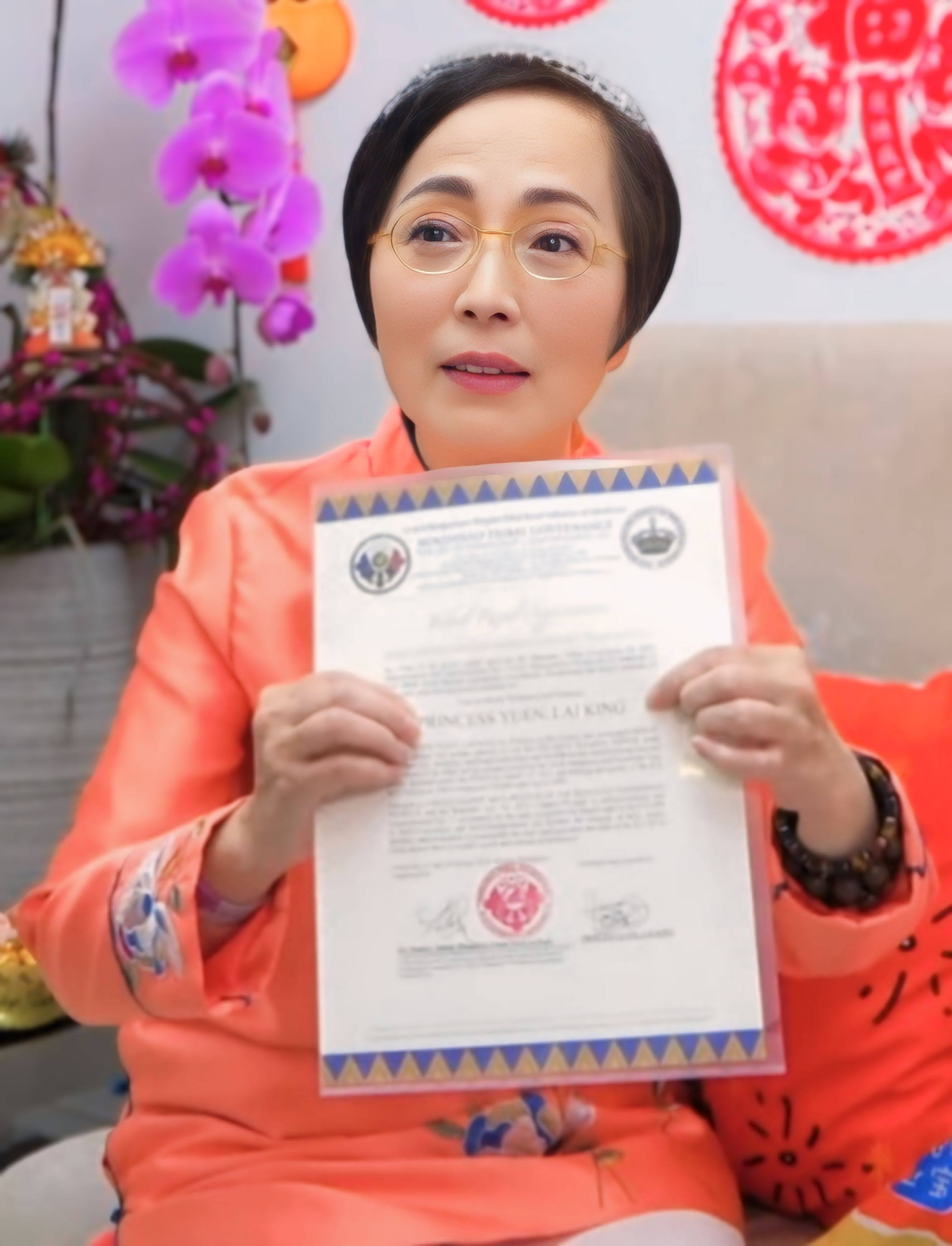
- Yuen in 2024
- Born: Yuen Lai King (苑麗瓊); 11 September 1963 (age 62); British Hong Kong
- Occupation: Actress
- Spouse: Huang Naiyang (m. 2004)
- Partner: Lam Ching-ying (1995–1996)

Chinese name
- Traditional Chinese: 苑瓊丹
- Simplified Chinese: 苑琼丹
Transcriptions
Standard Mandarin
- Hanyu Pinyin: Yuān Qióngdān
Yue: Cantonese
- Jyutping: Jyun1 king4 daan1

Kingdom Yuen King-dan (苑瓊丹; born 11 September 1963) is a Hong Kong actress with a long history working with TVB.

== Life and career ==
Yuen was born in Hong Kong, her father was an ivory carver. She started her acting career with HK ATV during the mid 80s and left around 1995 to join rival station TVB. In between her TV career, Yuen has been featured in many HK movies, including several with Stephen Chow's earlier films (Forbidden City Cop, God of Cookery, and Hail the Judge). Yuen has a long history with comedy and she has heavily played comedic roles in most of her career. However, she doesn't wish to be typecast into comedic roles and strives to diversify herself in other roles. On July 11, 2004, she married her boyfriend, Huang Naiyang. After nearly 17 years with TVB, Yuen decided to leave the station in 2012 and started filming dramas in mainland China. No longer tied to TVB, Yuen was able to express her disapproval of TVB's rough treatment of their actors. While she continues filming new dramas in mainland China, she still comes back to Hong Kong to film movies.

== Filmography ==
Year	Title	Role	Network	Notes
2019	My Kickass Wife			
2019	The Incredible Monk 3			
2019	The Knight of Shadows: Between Yin and Yang			
2019	Flirting Scholar from the Future			
2019	A Home with a View			
2018	The Great Adventurer Wesley		iQIYI / TVB	
2017	Always Be With You			
2016	My Dangerous Mafia Retirement Plan	So Yau-Miu	TVB Jade	
2016	Mad Monk Ji Gong			
2016	Insomnia Love			
2016	The Ghost House			
2016	Perfect Imperfection			
2015	Lost in Hong Kong			
2015	Fighting Youth			
2015	Scary Road is Fun			
2015	An Inspector Calls			
2015	King of Mahjong			
2014	Who Moved My Dream			
2014	Palace 3: The Lost Daughter	Mother Tan		
2014	Just Another Margin			
2014	The Cabin Crew			
2014	Black Comedy			
2012	King Maker	Gong Shuk Wong Hou		
2011	My Sassy Wife Xu Xiao Mei	Liu Yue E	TVB Jade; SMG	
2010	Twilight Investigation	Law Lai-la	TVB Jade	
2010	Happy Mother-in-Law, Pretty Daughter-in-Law	Ma Linglong	Shenzhen TV	
2010	When Lanes Merge	Chan Siu-fan	TVB Jade	Nominated - TVB Award for Best Supporting Actress (Top 15)
2010	Cupid Stupid	Chi Kam-giu	TVB Jade	
2009	The Beauty of the Game	Cheung Lai-hong	TVB Jade	
2008	Speech of Silence	Leung Lai-yu	TVB Jade	
2007	The Building Blocks of Life	Chung Kwok-mei	TVB Jade	
2007	The Green Grass of Home	Chu Lai-ngoh	TVB Jade	
2007-2008	Best Selling Secrets	Hung Sum	TVB Jade	
2007	The Price of Greed	Lo Sei-leung	TVB Jade	
2007	The White Flame	Koo Mei-lan	TVB Jade	
2006	Welcome to the House	Ko Lai	TVB Jade	Nominated - TVB Award for Best Supporting Actress (Top 5)
2006	At Point Blank	Ching Hiu-nam	TVB Jade	
2005	Women on the Run	Lee Chan-chan	TVB Jade	
2003	Virtues of Harmony II	Kam Sa-sa	TVB Jade	
2002	Let's Face It	Liu Tam Ai-ching	TVB Jade	
2001	Virtues of Harmony I	Princess Sa-sa	TVB Jade	
2001	Gods of Honour	Yan Sap-neung	TVB Jade	TVB Anniversary Award for Favourite Female Character
2001	Seven Sisters	Chow Fun	TVB Jade	
2000	War of the Genders	Mui Yat-sin	TVB Jade	
1999	Game of Deceit	Kau Kan-e	TVB Jade	
1999	A Loving Spirit	Cheung Nun-sin	TVB Jade	
1999	Detective Investigation Files IV	Chow Han-e	TVB Jade	
1998	Moments of Endearment	Chung Chi-mei	TVB Jade	
1998	Journey to the West II	The Crow	TVB Jade	
1998	Old Time Buddy - To Catch a Thief	Ng Yan-lai	TVB Jade	
1995	A Kindred Spirit	Yu King	TVB Jade	
1995	Vampire Expert		ATV Home	
1994	A Chinese Torture Chamber Story			
1994	Wing Chun	Abacus Fong		
1992	Flame		ATV Home	
1992	Casanova in China		ATV Home	
1992	Mythical Crane and Magical Needle		ATV Home	
1991	The Perfect Match			
1990	The Blood Sword		ATV Home	
1990	Cousin Q		ATV Home	
1988	The Rise and Fall of Qing Dynasty 2		ATV Home	
1987	Below the Lion Rock 1987		RTHK	
1984	Wan Hoi Yuk Gong Yuen		ATV Home	
