= You're Hired =

You're Hired may refer to:

- You're Hired (TV series), a 2009 Hong Kong comedy series
- The Apprentice: You're Hired!, the final episode of The Apprentice: You're Fired!
- The process of recruitment, or hiring, itself
