= Survivor's Law =

TV drama

- Promo poster
- 律政新人王
- Genre: Modern Drama
- Starring: Raymond Lam; Myolie Wu; Sammul Chan; Bernice Liu; Lok Ying Kwan; Ruby Wong
- Opening theme: "Forget Pain" (忘記傷害) by Raymond Lam
- Country of origin: Hong Kong
- Original language: Cantonese
- No. of episodes: 25

Production
- Executive producer: Tommy Leung
- Producer: TVB
- Production location: Hong Kong
- Running time: 45 minutes

Original release
- Network: TVB Jade
- Release: July 14 – August 15, 2003

Related
- Survivor's Law II

Survivor's Law (Traditional Chinese: 律政新人王) is a 25-episode TVB drama broadcast between July 14, 2003 to August 15, 2003. It is the direct prequel to 2007's Survivor's Law II (律政新人王II).

== Cast ==
- Raymond Lam as Lok Bun 樂斌 (Ben)
- Myolie Wu as Chung Ching-Ling 鍾清鈴 (Ling Ling)
- Sammul Chan as Cheuk Wai-Ming 卓偉名 (Vincent)
- Bernice Liu as Chiang Si-Ka 蔣思嘉 (Jessica)
- Lok Ying Kwan as Hung Ting-Wai 洪定威 (Homer)
- Ruby Wong as Kwok Yim-Na 郭艷娜 (Angela)
- Lee Kwok Lun as Lee Ming-Kit 李明杰 (Marco)
- Felix Lok as Hung Ding Wai 洪定威 (Homer)
- Hui Siu Hung as Lok Kin 樂健
- Chan Ka Yee as Yuen Siu-Fong 袁小芳
- Casper Chan as Lok Nga 樂雅 (Go Go)
- Lee Sing Cheung as Chung Hon-Sing 鍾漢星
- Rosanne Lui as Leung Fung-Ping 梁鳳萍
- Liu Kai Chi as Cheuk Fan 卓凡
- Winnie Yeung as Nancy
- Juno Mak as Ma Ching-Kin 馬青見 (Ah Leng)
- Helen Tam as Lee Mei-Lei 李美利 (Money)
- Cha Cha Chan as Miu Choi-Si 苗賽詩 (Cecilia)

== Synopsis ==
H.K. Firm is a down-and-out law firm looked upon with scorn and derision by the law fraternity. Owner Homer Hong Dingwei (Lok Ying Kwan), a lawyer who had his license removed for offending the judge, has no choice but to recruit fresh law graduates to revamp the firm.

Ben Lok (Raymond Lam) had been sacked by his previous employer because of his unconventional image and attitude. Saddled with his family’s financial burdens, Ben has no other choice but to work at H.K Firm. There, he meets three other young lawyers, all of whom are working for Homer for different reasons.

Vincent Cheuk (Sammul Chan) refuses to be a small fry following a big lawyer around and so joins a small firm to fight his own cases independently.

Chung Ching-Ling (Myolie Wu), ostracized at the previous law firm for her passionate and righteous ways, decides to make her career in H.K. Firm instead.

Jessica Chiang (Bernice Liu), she has followed her heart and Vincent into the firm.

Through time and trial, all four become tight friends. Nevertheless, a complicated love rectangle, misunderstandings and ambitions threaten to break their bond…

== Plot ==
The series first begin with some realistic and interesting civil cases such as custody battles, divorce settlements, and a case featuring a severed finger. The four lawyers work brilliantly on these cases and at the same time, grows closer to each other.

A divorce case brings Homer and Jessica's aunt Angela, another well-known lawyer, heads on as the two defend their own genders in an amusing case of banter. It is revealed the two of them used to be together. Homer, however, now has a wife and throughout the show is frequently seen as easily intimidated by Angela.

During a custody battle case, Ching-Ling learns that her mother was not her biological mother. By the time she learned of this, her real mother had died. Furious at being denied the chance to ever meet her real mother, she leaves home and starts living with Jessica instead. Her personal feelings interferes with her case performance, causing her to lose, but the parents were so moved by her words the child was allowed to see both parents.

In a case dealing with corporations trying to take more money from their customers, Vincent and Jessica work together and he teaches her to be more confident and sure of herself. When they win the case, Jessica wants to give Vincent a hug, but when he holds out his hands for a high-five instead she accepts it.

Ben gets a similar case where his parents are pressured by a company to sign a contract they never wanted, Ben helps them take the case to court. He first intended to play the role of a son and not a lawyer, but after a while could not resist pointing out to the judge several laws that could work to his family's favour. The judge, amused, ends the case in Ben's favour.

For a real mystery, the case of the severed finger is given. Vincent and Ben are called up by Homer in the middle of a night to a street, where they find Homer's friend throwing up. All he could say was 'water bottle', and when Ben picks it up, he sees to his horror a severed finger in it. They convince the innocent man not to flee and instead report to the police - headed by none other than Vincent's father. All four lawyers, with help from Homer himself, try to find out more information and in the end, even finds the real culprit.

The possible romance is already hinted as it is revealed that Jessica has been in love with Vincent for a while, much to the teasing of Ben. However, due to a series of hilarious misunderstandings, the firm believes that Jessica and Ben are together. Meanwhile, Ben falls for Ching-Ling, but he holds back when it is revealed that she is starting a relationship with Vincent. Vincent figured out Ben harboured feelings for Ching-Ling, but Ben promised not to interfere. Vincent and Ching-Ling seem like the 'ideal' couple, and neither Ben or Jessica was willing to ruin it.

Vincent's ambitions and Ching-Ling's sense of justice soon came to a clash when he illegally disturbed the prosecution witnesses in the hopes of winning his own cases. It didn't help that his father and Ben were also involved. Ben's client was accused of murder, but he wasn't responsible because at that time, he was helping smuggle drugs. The sole witness: A police officer who chased him for several streets. The police officer: Vincent's father, who had used the drugs Ben's client threw away to frame a drug dealer.

Ben wanted Vincent's father to testify so that his client could be cleared, but Vincent objected. If his father testified and admitted he went against police protocol by framing the dealer, his father could go to jail. In Vincent's eyes, drug smugglers were the scum of society and nowhere as important as a police officers, so he couldn't see why Ben was so intent on helping them. Just as Ben's and Vincent's friendship looked as if it were being placed on its limits, Vincent's father voluntarily confesses everything in court. Ben's client was cleared, but now Vincent's father had to go through the court system. Vincent tried defending his father, but it was a lost case, and Vincent's father was sentenced to jail.

The unhappy Vincent then got himself drunk and encountered Ching-Ling at that state. She, however, was disappointed and disgusted with him and his methods, and refused to be with him any longer. In a sick twist, Ben arrived at the scene and witnessed the whole thing. Vincent then accused him of stealing Ching-Ling away, revealing to her that Ben had feelings towards her. Furious at what she thought were false accusations to Vincent's best friend, she leaves with Ben.

Later, Vincent asked for a vacation and momentarily leaves the firm. Homer granted it to him, deciding he needed some time to recover from losing both a father and love interest. Ben, in a move showing his deep friendship with Vincent, tells Ching-Ling not to be angry at Vincent for he did harbour feelings for her. However, he knows not to pursue on them, and she accepts this.

After a few more cases, Vincent returns. On the surface, he had recovered and was once again friendly towards his co-workers. This quickly turned out to be a front, for now he was using any possible means to win his new cases. This contrasted with his friends, who always tried to help anyone who was wronged. Vincent was now helping those with money, unconcerned whether they were guilty or not. He disappointed everyone, those in the law firm, his father, and his friends. Only Jessica openly remained supportive of him.

Ching-Ling soon starts having feelings for Ben, but the timing could not have been anymore cruel. Ben's friend, who was in jail, had called him due to new evidence. Ben arrived, and it is revealed that one of the reasons Ben became a lawyer was because seven years ago his friend was wrongly prosecuted and sentenced to jail for a crime he did not commit. The inmate told Ben that he heard from one of the other prisoners that a man named 'Saw-Pao' (Literally 'Crazy Leopard') was responsible for the crime he was imprisoned for. The crime was the stabbing of a girl in a park. With Jessica's help, Ben reviews over the case, and sees that the sole witness to the crime was Ching-Ling herself.

For appeal grounds, Ben shows how there was evidence of a third party due to blood found on the crime scene that did not belong to anyone identified. Then, he and Jessica track Saw-Pao down and takes some of his blood to be tested for DNA.

Ching-Ling knew nothing about this. So when Ben asked to meet her, she thought he was going to ask her whether they could try starting a relationship. When Ben informs her he plans to reopen the case, she is furious and emotionally upset. Her own reason for becoming a lawyer was also because of this case, the cruel murder of her best friend, hence her earlier sensitivity to any cases related to violence against woman. It was obvious that once again, Ben and Ching-Ling were denied a chance to be together.

The next time they met was in court. Ben, the defense lawyer, asked Ching-Ling, the witness, why she was so sure the defendant was guilty. She says that he was always following her friend around, but was constantly rejected. Ben pointed out that the crime occurred at night and there were no lights around so she couldn't have seen the face of the culprit. Ching-Ling counters she saw the abnormally large nose and that was enough for her to know who the murderer was. Ben then holds up several photos, all of them completely covered except for their noses. He asks her to identify which nose belonged to the culprit. When she chooses one of pictures, he lifts the cover off to show Saw-Pao's face, and announces to the court Saw-Pao's blood was also found on the crime scene seven years ago. The court and Ching-Ling realized that they had sentenced the wrong person, and Ben's friend was finally released.

Following the case's ending, a new one began as Saw-Pao now has to go through court. He hired his own lawyer: Vincent. His friends were dismayed, and tried to tell him not to accept the case. Not only did he refuse to listen to them, but he pursued the case like it was a way of revenge. He questioned Ben's credibility and described gave Ching-Ling a poor impression to the court. Not wanting to sink to his level, Ben tried to look for more evidence, and soon found a driver that could testify Saw-Pao was present on the day of the crime. Ben and Ching-Ling were happy, for the case looked as if it were going to finish quickly and smoothly.

What the two didn't expect was Vincent's now cruel cunning. Vincent had figured out Ben's feelings for Ching-Ling earlier, but now he had also figured out Jessica's feelings for him. So he charmed her to tell him Ben's progress with the case, and found out about the driver. He confronted Saw-Pao about it, telling him this can make things unpleasant. Saw-Pao then gives Vincent a cheque and told him to give it to a certain person at a bar. Vincent did as told, not suspecting what the cheque was for. Later, in the middle of a trial, the news was out that the driver had been killed 'in a fire', the trial ended with Saw-Pao walking away free.

At last, Jessica gave up on him. She slapped Vincent on the face and yelled at him, telling him he was no more than a dog of Saw-Pao now. Vincent never meant for things to go this far, but it appeared now that not only was everyone in the law firm disappointed in him, they were disgusted with him. Things were only made worst when Saw-Pao cornered Ching-Ling and graphically described how he killed her best friend, traumatizing her. Vincent told him to stop, but Saw-Pao was no friend of his and reminded Vincent that Saw-Pao was practically his only companion now. To seal Vincent's losses, in his next visit to his father he is told how disappointed his father is with him, and tells Vincent that unless he can go back to the right path, don't ever visit him again.

Solemn, Vincent wanders out aimlessly and nearly gets hit by a car. Ben pulls him away and when Vincent asks him why, Ben answers that he wouldn't give up hope so easily when it comes to his friends. Now given a spark of hope, Vincent decides to amend for his mistakes, and goes to the bar that he had given the cheque away to. He never met the man again, and instead it is Saw-Pao who greets him.

Saw-Pao starts talking of how worthless and incapable Vincent now was. The words deeply affected Vincent is his state, and Saw-Pao decides to go further. He places a gun on the table and tells Vincent to shoot him, and when Vincent hesitated Saw-Pao points out how weak Vincent was. He then talks of how he had some lackeys of his to go kidnap Jessica, the one whom Saw-Pao had figured Vincent cared for. Vincent watched as Saw-Pao picked up his cell phone and started talking about how his lackeys should treat Jessica. Frightened and enraged, Vincent picks up the gun and shoots Saw-Pao in the head - right in front of the bartender.

As it turns out, Jessica was not kidnapped or harmed at all, Saw-Pao was simply lying to blackmail Vincent. Yet now that Vincent had killed someone, he has to go to court. He chooses Ben as his defense lawyer, and when the latter asks why Vincent chose him, Vincent tells him he was hoping what Ben said was true - that he wouldn't give up on friends so easily. Ben took the case, and during trial Vincent saw that everyone was present. The trial ended in Vincent's favour, and he was released.

The four returned to being friends, but it quickly turned into something more. Ben finally got together with Ching-Ling and the same thing occurred between Vincent and Jessica.
