= Sammul Chan =

- Born: Chan Yan-yiu 陳恩耀 (Traditional) 陈恩耀 (Simplified); Can4 Jan1 Jiu6 (Cantonese); Chén Ēnyào (Mandarin); Hong Kong
- Occupations: Actor; singer; presenter
- Years active: 1999–2020 retired permanently

Chinese name
- Traditional Chinese: 陳鍵鋒
- Simplified Chinese: 陈键锋
Transcriptions
Standard Mandarin
- Hanyu Pinyin: Chén Jiànfēng
Yue: Cantonese
- Jyutping: Can4 Gin6 Fung1
- Musical career
- Also known as: sanmiao 三苗
- Website: Sammul Chan on Weibo (in Chinese)(in Chinese)

Sammul Chan Kin-fung is a Hong Kong actor, singer, and presenter.

== Career ==
Chan debuted in 1999 as a DJ for Metro Broadcast Corporation Limited under his birth name, although most of the time he was simply referred to and credited as simply "Sammul". From 1999, he has signed with three record labels to release albums, but all were not successful. He recorded a full-length Mandarin album in Taiwan, but the label failed.

In 1999, after signing a management contract with Ivy Entertainment and a filming contract with TVB, he began to officially use the Chinese stage name Chan Kin-fung and began filming television dramas. He later gained recognition as the ambitious young lawyer Vincent in the 2003 TVB drama Survivor's Law and received further popularity through his role as Donald in Triumph in the Skies, a ratings hit.

== Filmography ==
=== Film ===
Year	Film	Role	Notes
1999	The Young Ones	Chan Chi-lung	
1999	Sunny Cops		
2000	Eternal Love		
2001	Phantom Call	Royie Chan	
2001	Ashes to Ashes: Against Smoking		
2001	The Avenging Fist	Nova	Voice
2001	Shadow	Sammy	
2002	Irresistible Piggies	Peter Pao	
2003	Man Suddenly in Black	flight attendant	
2005	Colour of the Loyalty		
2005	New Born	Chan Wang-fung	
2005	iSir		
2006	We Are Family	flight attendant	
2007	200 Pounds Beauty	Sang-jun	Voice (Cantonese)
2009	Turning Point	police officer	
2010	Virtual Recall		
2018	Under the Tower		
2019	Legend of the Demon Seal		

=== Television dramas ===
Year	Title	Role	Notes
1999	Side Beat	Choi	Episode 2
1999	A Kindred Spirit	–	Episode 1102 (Uncredited)
2000	Armed Reaction II	Tim	Episode 25
2000	Incurable Traits	Young General	
2000	Crimson Sabre	–	(Uncredited)
2001	The Heaven Sword and Dragon Sabre	Hon Cin-jip	Episodes 15–17, 21–22
2001	Reaching Out	Ken Kwok Kai-bong	
2003	Survivor's Law	Vincent Cheuk Wai-ming	
2003	Triumph in the Skies	Donald Man Ho-chung	
2003	Point of No Return	Tsang Kwok-bong	
2004	The Vigilante in the Mask	Po Kwong	
2004	ICAC Investigators 2004	Ming	Episode: "Abuse of Power"
2004	Supreme Fate	Sammul	Episode: "Sister's Pride"
2005	Wong Fei-hung: Master of Kung Fu	Leung Foon	Nominated — TVB Awards for Most Improved Actor
2005	The Academy	Lee Pak-kiu	Nominated – TVB Awards for Most Improved Actor
2005	When Rules Turn Loose	Dick Ching Hok-kan	
2006	Bar Benders	Lam Ka-suen	Nominated – TVB Awards for Most Improved Actor
2006	Maidens' Vow	Wang Yuk-luen; Sheung Yat-kat	Nominated – TVB Awards for Most Improved Actor; Nominated – TVB Awards for Best Supporting Actor
2006	The Price of Greed	Tsui Fung / Mau Chi	Warehoused; Nominated – Astro Drama Awards for My Most Unforgettable Villain
2007	The White Flame	Yung Tak-kei	Previously warehoused; released overseas March 2002
2007	The Academy II: On The First Beat	PC. Lee Pak-kiu	
2007	The Legend of Chu Liuxiang	Emperor	
2007–08	Survivor's Law II	Vincent Cheuk Wai-ming	
2008	The Last Princess	Wen Liangyu	
2008	The Four	Chui Leuk-sheung / Chaser	
2008	Rose Martial World	Ming Shaoqing	
2009	The Academy III: EU	PI. Lee Pak-kiu	
2009	A Bride for a Ride	Chow Man-bun	
2009	ICAC Investigators 2009	Senior Investigator Chan Ka-ming	Episode: "Public, Private, Car"
2010	Beauty's Rival in Palace	Liu Heng, Emperor Wen of Han	Seoul International Drama Awards for Most Popular Male Artist (China)
2010	Reflection from the Misty Rain	Zhang Cheng'en	
2010	The Comeback Clan	Glenn Yip Chik-leung	
2011	Relic of an Emissary	Ma Sam-po / Cheng Wo	
2011	The Golden Age of the Leftover Ladies	Li Hao	
2011	Guts of Man	Tung Fei	Previously warehoused, released overseas May 2005
2011	Ai Shang Wei Xiao	Dr. Jiao Tianzuo	Tudou internet drama
2011	ICAC Investigators 2011	Senior Investigator Wu Ching-yuen	Episode 5: "Private Patients"
2012	In Search of the Supernatural	Su He / Xiao Dai	
2012	Luan Shi Jia Ren	He Tian	
2013	Wheel of Fortune	Youdao	
2013	Beauties at the Crossfire	Du Yuntang	
2013	We Get Married 咱们结婚吧		
2014	The Investiture of the Gods	Jiang Ziya	
2014	Tears of Woman	Wu Lianshan	
2012	Weibo Daren	Han Zijing	post-production
2013	12 Money Darts	Yang Hua	post-production
2016	Trumpet of Blood and Iron	Gao Chang	

== Discography ==
- "Contact Lense Hero" (隱形眼鏡俠)
- "Spinning" (旋旋轉)
- "Surrounded" (左擁右抱)
- "Same Space" (同等的空間)
- "Saving This Moment" (留住這時光)
- "Bicycle" (單車) – originally by Eason Chan
- "The Stronger, the Braver" (愈強越勇) – Olympic Six Stars
- "My Pride" (我的驕傲) – Olympic Six Stars
- "Riding Winds, Plowing Waves" (乘風破浪) – Olympic Six Stars
- "Suddenly" (來去豁然) – Olympic Six Stars
- "Clicked You" (CLICK中你)
- "New Friend" (新朋友)
- "Strong" (強) – The Academy (學警雄心) Sub-theme, originally by Aaron Kwok
- "Child, Let Me Love" (孩子‧讓我愛) – New Born (天地孩兒) theme song
- "True Hero" (真心英雄) – Guts of Man (肝膽崑崙) theme song
- "Unwilling" (捨不得)
- "Storm" (風暴) – The Four (少年四大名捕) theme song, with Raymond Lam, Ron Ng, Kenneth Ma
- "Black and White Variation" (黑白變奏) – EU (學警狙擊) theme song, with Ron Ng and Michael Tse
- "Legalized Bride Theft" (合法搶親) – A Bride for a Ride (王老虎搶親) theme song, with Chin Kar-lok and Wong Cho Lam
- "Loving You Is My Happiness" (愛你就是我的幸福) – Yan Yu Xie Yang (煙雨斜陽) theme song
- "Seeing the best of you in the worst times"(最坏时候遇上最好的你) – "feng huo jia ren" (烽火佳人) theme song
- "Together with you" (与你同在) – "tong mou zhe" (同谋者) theme song, with RegenC

== Awards and nominations ==
TVB Anniversary Awards

- Most Improved Actor – nominee for Bar Benders, Maiden's Vow (2006)
- Best Supporting Actor – nominee for Maiden's Vow (2006)
- Most Improved Actor—nominee for The Academy, Wong Fei Hung: Master of Kung Fu (2005)
