= Candy Chu =

Hong Kong actress

- Born: October 23, 1975 (age 50)
- Occupation: Actress
- Years active: 1998–present

Chinese name
- Traditional Chinese: 朱婉儀
- Simplified Chinese: 朱婉仪
Transcriptions
Standard Mandarin
- Hanyu Pinyin: zhū wǎn yí
Yue: Cantonese
- Jyutping: jue yuen yi
- Musical career
- Label: TVB

Candy Chu is a Hong Kong actress for the popular Hong Kong TVB television station.

== Career ==
Chu entered Miss Hong Kong pageant in 2000, she was 24 years old when entering the pageant. Her goal is to become a successful actress.

Her roles in TVB are minor, but she hopes one day she will have bigger roles to act in.

== Filmography ==
- At Point Blank (2001, TVB)
- Armed Reaction 3 (2001, TVB)
- A Herbalist Affair (2002, TVB)
- Police Station No. 7 (2002, TVB)
- The Stamp of Love (2002, TVB)
- Take My Word For It (2002, TVB)
- Fight for Love (2002, TVB)
- Slim Chances (2002, TVB)
- The White Flame (2002, TVB)
- The Threat of Love II (2002, TVB)
- Legal Entanglement (2002, TVB)
- Virtues of Harmony II (2003, TVB)
- Let's Face It (2003, TVB)
- Burning Flames II (2003, TVB)
- War and Beauty (2004, TVB)
- Love Bond (2005, TVB)
- Scavengers' Paradise (2005, TVB)
- Wars of In-Laws II (2008, TVB)
- The Silver Chamber of Sorrows (2008, TVB)
- When A Dog Loves A Cat (2008, TVB)
- Legend of the Demigods (2008, TVB)
- The Four (2008, TVB)
- D.I.E. Again (2009, TVB)
- Beyond the Realm of Conscience (2009, TVB)
- Born Rich (2009, TVB)
- The Beauty of the Game (2009, TVB)
- The Comeback Clan (2010. TVB)
- Yes, Sir. Sorry, Sir! (2011, TVB)
- Ghetto Justice (2011, TVB)
- No Good Either Way (2012, TVB)
- The Election (2014)
- To Be or Not to Be (2014)
