= Mandy Cho =

Hong Kong beauty contestant (born 1982)

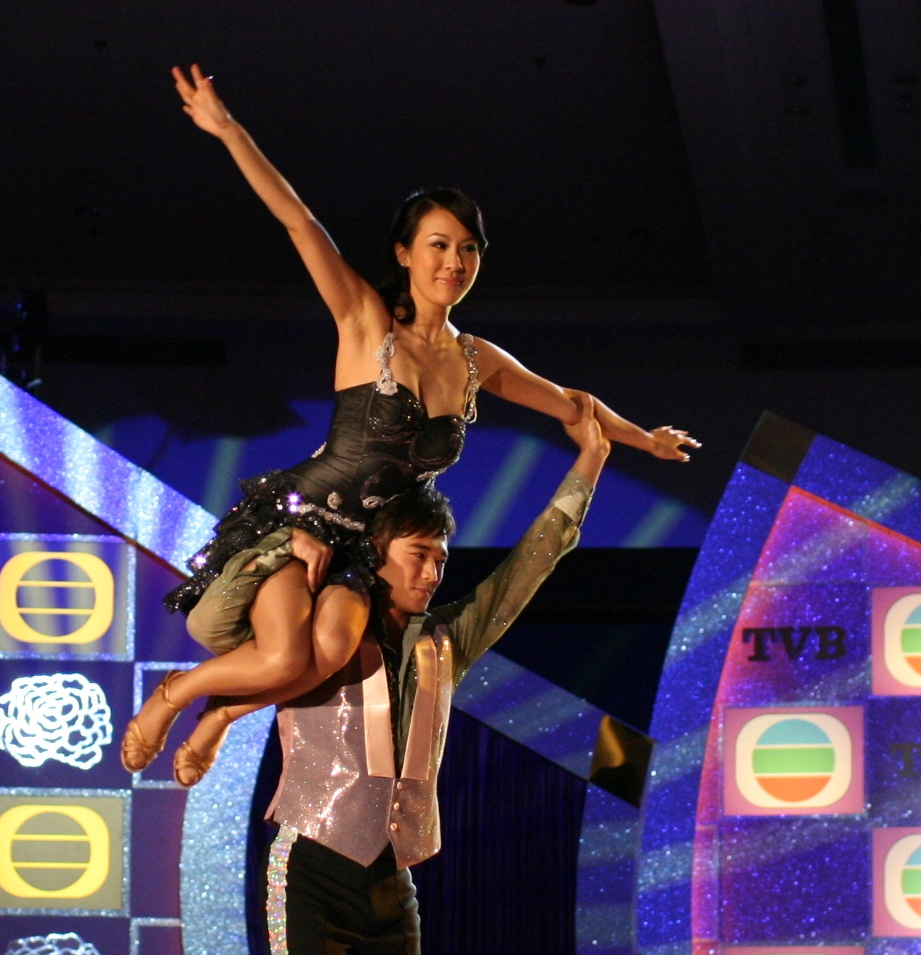
- Cho in 2008
- Born: Mandy Lee Cho; September 2, 1982 (age 44); Sacramento County, California
- Occupation: Actress
- Years active: 2003–present
- Spouse: Cheung Ka Kit (m. 2010)
- Children: Dora Cheung Yat-ching, b. 8 July 2011 (age 15)

Chinese name
Transcriptions
Standard Mandarin
- Hanyu Pinyin: Cáo Mǐnlì
Yue: Cantonese
- Jyutping: cou4 man5 lei6

Mandy Lee Cho (born September 2, 1982 in Sacramento County, California) is a Hong Kong beauty contestant and television personality.

Cho studied in San Francisco, United States. She went to Hong Kong in 2003 and competed in the 2003 Miss Hong Kong Pageant. A favorite at the start of the competition, she made it into the semifinals and won the Perfect Team Award. Then in August, she competed in the finals and beat favorites like Selena Li, Rabee'a Yeung, and Carrie Lee for the title. Later Cho appeared in TVB series including Split Second, Guts of Man, and The Charm Beneath. She also became the seventh contestant from Hong Kong to win the Miss Chinese International First Runner-up title. Cho is also the second woman after Winnie Yeung (also from Hong Kong) to win the Miss Friendship title. The eventual winner of the 2004 Miss Chinese International title was Linda Chung.

In 2006, Cho completed her studies at the Gemological Institute of America in New York City and is now a Graduate Gemologist. She returned to Hong Kong in September 2006. Though she said she was working as a PR at a jewelry company when she first returned to Hong Kong, she is now working as an actress once more.

== Filmography ==
=== TV series ===
| Year | Title | Role | Notes |
|---|---|---|---|
| 2004 | Split Second | Tang Wai Ting (Maggie) | |
| 2004 | Love Paradise in Regalia Bay | Mandy | |
| 2004 | Sunshine Heartbeat | jewellery shop staff | Guest star |
| 2005 | Guts of Man | Ying Hiu Suet | |
| 2005 | Women on the Run | Tong Man Chi (Judy) | ep. 21-25 |
| 2005 | The Charm Beneath | Chuk Ming Man | |
| 2007 | War and Destiny | Sum Yi Ping | |
| 2008 | Love Exchange | Yu Siu Long (Nikita) | |
| 2009 | You're Hired | Wah Kiu | |
| 2009 | Beyond the Realm of Conscience | Consort Wai | |
| 2010 | Cupid Stupid | Fong Cheuk Kei (Anna) | warehoused |
| 2010 | My Better Half | Yau Ka Lei | |

== Awards ==
2000 Model Competition:

- Internet Popularity

Miss Hong Kong 2003:

- Miss Hong Kong 2003, Diamond Skin, Miss International Goodwill, Miss Figure Beauty, Perfect Group

Miss Chinese International 2004:

- First Runner up and Miss Friendship

TVB:

- Best Newcomer

Achievements
| Preceded by Tiffany Lam | Miss Hong Kong; 2003 | Succeeded by Kate Tsui |
| Preceded by Tiffany Lam | Miss Chinese International (1st runner-up); 2004 | Succeeded by Fala Chen |
