= Cupid Stupid =

Hong Kong television series

- Intertitle
- 戀愛星求人
- Genre: Modern Romance
- Starring: Steven Ma; Tavia Yeung; Michael Tse; Mandy Cho; Kingdom Yuen; Ram Chiang; Shermon Tang
- Country of origin: Hong Kong
- Original language: Cantonese
- No. of episodes: 20

Production
- Producer: Tsui Yue On
- Running time: 45 minutes (approx.)

Original release
- Network: TVB
- Release: 25 January – 25 February 2010

Cupid Stupid
- Traditional Chinese: 戀愛星求人
- Literal meaning: Cupid Stupid
Transcriptions
Yue: Cantonese
- Jyutping: Lyun2 Ngoi3 Seng1 Kau4 Jan4

Cupid Stupid
- Traditional Chinese: 占星情緣
- Literal meaning: The Stars of Love
Transcriptions
Yue: Cantonese
- Jyutping: Zim1 Seng1 Cing4 Jyun4

Cupid Stupid, formerly known as The Stars of Love, is a TVB modern romance series which premiered on Malaysia's Astro On Demand Channel from 25 January 2010 until 25 February 2010. There were twenty episodes.

== Synopsis ==
Chi Yat-Po (Steven Ma), a fishmonger constantly helps his friend Kan Ngo-Lam (Tavia Yeung) who is always getting into trouble with her "bad" boyfriends. The two friends meet Koon Sing-Ho (Michael Tse), a famous toymaker, who has the talent to make anything he desires into a game. They are also introduced to Fong Cheuk-Kei (Mandy Cho), Sing-Ho's girlfriend, who tries her best to put up with his mischievous ways.

Chi Yat-Po is in love with Ngo-Lam, but never has the courage to tell her. When he finally decides to reveal his true feelings, he is stopped by the meddling Wong Man-Keun (Shermon Tang), Ngo-Lam's best friend who has a crush on Chi-Yat Po.

Sing-Ho and Ngo-Lam both share strong believe in horoscopes and fortunes, however in the later chapters they find out they have more in common than just horoscopes. The two find themselves developing feelings for each other and soon become a couple. However, Ngo-Lam soon finds out that Chi Yat-Po has liked her for a long time and she finds herself torn between Sing-Ho and Yat-Po. To complicate matters more, Cheuk-Kei begins dating Sing-Ho's arch-rival, Frankie (Ruco Chan).

Meanwhile, Chi-Yat Po's aunt, Chi Kam Kiu (Kingdom Yuen) finds herself constantly arguing with her ex-husband (Lee Kwok Lun), whom she shares an apartment with. She utterly despises him and regrets marrying him. She is angered by the reappearance of a man named Greeny (Ram Chiang), a horoscope expert who told her to marry her husband. When Greeny finds out about the divorce and the tears she has been through, he tries his best to make up with Kam-Kiu, and at the same time he tries to hide the fact that he has feelings for her...

The characters face many trials of love before they each find who is the one truly most important to them in their hearts.

== Cast ==
=== Chi family ===
Cast	Role	Description
Lau Dan	Chi Kam Kwai 池金貴	Leo; A fish hawker Chi Kam Kiu's elder brother Chi Yat Po's father Discorded with Kan Wing Chung
Kingdom Yuen	Chi Kam Kiu, Josephine 池金嬌	Taurus; A vegetable hawker Chi Kam Kwai's younger sister Chi Yat Po's aunt Leung Ping's ex-husband Yip Sheung Mao's girlfriend, later wife Discorded with Kan Wing Chung
Steven Ma	Chi Yat Po 池一寶	Capricorn; A fish hawker Chi Kam Kwai's son Chi Kam Kiu's nephew Kan Ngo Lam and Koon Sing Ho's friend Yip Sheung Mao's friend, later uncle Loved Kan Ngo Lam; Wong Mei Kuen's love interest

=== Kan family ===
Cast	Role	Description
Albert Lo	Kan Wing Chung 簡永松	A toy shop owner Kan Ngo Lam's father Discorded with Chi Kam Kwai and Chi Kam Kiu
Tavia Yeung	Kan Ngo Lam, Twinkle 簡傲藍	Virgo; Toy designer and divine in astrology Former game centre staff Koon Sing Ho's girlfriend and subordinate Chi Yat Po's friend and love interest

=== Wong family ===
Cast	Role	Description
Peter Lai	Wong Shui 黃水	A fruit hawker Lam So Ngo's husband Wong Mei Kuen's father Leung Ping's uncle
Helen Ma	Lam So Ngo 林素娥	A fruit hawker Wong Shui's wife Wong Mei Kuen's mother Leung Ping's aunt
Shermon Tang	Wong Mei Kuen 黃美娟	A model Wong Shui and Lam So Ngo's daughter Leung Ping's cousin Kan Ngo Lam and Chi Yat Po's friend Loved Chi Yat Po

=== Children's Dream Toy Company ===
Cast	Role	Description
Yu Yang	Chiu Wang Kei 趙宏基	Boss; Changed to be consultant in Episode 16
Susan Tse	Che Lee Goh Fu 車李歌芙	Boss; Chung Kin Pong's aunt Invested in the company in Episode 16
So Yan-tsz	Mrs. Chiu 趙太	Chiu Wang Kei's wife
Michael Tse	Koon Sing Ho, Jeff 官星皓	Sagittarius; A toy designer Fong Cheuk Kei's ex-boyfriend Kan Ngo Lam's boyfriend Chi Yat Po's friend and love rival Chung Kin Pong's enemy, but finally friend
Mandy Cho	Fong Cheuk Kei, Anna 方卓琪	Libra; An accountant Koon Sing Ho's ex-girlfriend Kan Ngo Lam's love rival Chung Kin Pong's girlfriend
Ruco Chan	Chung Kin Pong, Frankie 鍾建邦	Aquarius; A toy engineer, promoted to CEO in Episode 17; Fong Cheuk Kai's boyfriend Koon Sing Ho's enemy, but finally friend Che Lee Goh Fu's nephew
Fred Cheng	Mak Chiu Chun, Samuel 麥超俊	Koon Sing Ho's subordinate
Lam Ying-hung	Jenny	Koon Sing Ho's subordinate
Benjamin Yuen	Kelvin	Koon Sing Ho's subordinate
Mark Ma Kwun Tung	Sunny	Koon Sing Ho's subordinate
Tong Chun-ming	Leon	Koon Sing Ho's subordinate
Tavia Yeung	Kan Ngo Lam, Twinkle 簡傲藍	A junior toy designer Koon Sing Ho's subordinate
Chan Man Ching	Jojo	A receptionist Fong Cheuk Kei's friend Gossip queen
Tsang Wai-wan	Nancy	Che Lee Goh Fu's secretary

=== Other characters ===
Cast	Role	Description
Ram Chiang	Yip Sheung Mao, Greeny 葉常茂	Scorpio; A flower shop owner The author of "Zodiac Little Princess"; Apple's son Chi Kam Kiu's boyfriend, later husband Chi Yat Po's friend, later uncle Koon Sing Ho, Kam Ngo Lam, Fong Cheuk Kei's friend
Joseph Lee	Leung Ping, Romeo 梁炳	Pisces; Chi Kam Kiu's ex-husband Wong Shui and Lam So-ngo's nephew Wong Mei-kuen's cousin Cheated Chi Kam Kiu (Semi-villain)
Law Lok-lam	Cheung Wong 張旺	A fishery owner Ar Kwong's father Chi Kam Kwai's friend
Yip Wai	Ar Kwong 阿光	Cheung Wong's son Determined to cheat Chi Kam Kiu for money with Leung Ping (Villain)
Iris Wong	Tsui Hau Hau 徐巧巧	An egg hawker, later a vegetable hawker Cheated Chi Kam Kiu, Wong Shui, Kam Wing Chung, Leung Ping; Arrested for kidnapping Kam Wing Chung (Villain)
Jack Wu	Simon	Kan Ngo Lam and Samantha's ex-boyfriend Cheated Kan Ngo Lam (Villain)
Terasa Ha	Apple	Yip Sheung Wai's mother
Fanny Ip	Samantha	Kan Ngo Lam's classmate and enemy Simon's ex-girlfriend
