= Guts of Man =

Hong Kong television series

Guts of Man (Traditional Chinese: 肝膽崑崙), also called Courageous Kunlun, was a Hong Kong TVB costume action series produced by Tommy Leung Choi Yuen. 20 episodes were produced for the series in 2004.

== Plot ==
Dung Fei (Sammul Chan) and Seung Foon (Ron Ng) becomes friends after a couple of head collisions, and after meeting a wealthy business man's daughter, Ying Hiu Suet (Mandy Cho), the three eventually become good friends. Foon was starting to have feelings for Hiu Suet and Fei tries to help him out, but he also ends up falling in love with her. Meanwhile, Fei and his sister Dung Lam (Joyce Koi) finds out that their father's death was uncleared, so they decided to look into that, unveiling more than they can handle.

== Cast ==
- Sammul Chan - Tung Fei
- Ron Ng - Seung Foon
- Mandy Cho - Ying Hiu Suet
- Joyce Koi - Dung Lam
- Louisa So - Yan Dan Fung
- Yuen Wah - Dik Ying Wai
- Kwok Fung - Ying Jin Tong
- Savio Tsang - Au Yeung Sok
- Lee Ka Sing

== Airdates ==
Guts of Man aired in May 2005 on overseas channels. It did not air on the TVB Jade channel.
