= The Green Grass of Home =

- Poster
- 緣來自有機
- Genre: Modern Drama
- Starring: Sunny Chan; Christine Ng; Lai Lok-yi; Natalie Tong; Yuen Wah
- Opening theme: "平凡" by Leo Ku
- Country of origin: Hong Kong
- Original language: Cantonese
- No. of episodes: 20

Production
- Running time: 45 minutes (approx.)
- Production company: TVB

Original release
- Network: TVB Jade
- Release: June 11 – July 6, 2007

The Green Grass of Home (Traditional Chinese: 緣來自有機) is a TVB modern drama series broadcast in June 2007.

== Synopsis ==
Stella Yip Moon-Chi (Christine Ng) is an interior designer who works as the head of her business' team, but is demanding, high-strung, and treats her staff badly. When her secretary tells Stella's boss about Stella's stress related health problems, Stella is fired. She ends up meeting Choi Ka-Sing (Sunny Chan), her dream man, a mellow and easy-going man working as a utility man, and learning to relax.

At the same time, Stella's family struggles with problems of their own. Stella's younger sister, Yip Moon-Lam (Mimi Lo), and her husband, Hung Kwok-Wai (Wong Chi Yin), are selfish and opportunistic, taking advantage of everyone, including Stella's father, Yip Cheung-Fat (Yuen Wah) and her older brother, Yip Shang-Shing (Makbau Mak)'s family; Stella's sister-in-law, Chu Lai-Ngoh (Kingdom Yuen) is constantly suspicious of Stella's younger sister's motives and they argue all the time. Stella's father, finally tired of trying mediate his unstable family, is befriended by Choi Ka-Sing and moves back to the countryside, where he becomes friends with Choi Ka-Sing's family. At the same time, Choi Ka-Sing's shy younger brother, Choi Ka-Bo (Lai Lok-yi), becomes infatuated with a passionate environmental activist, Yung Wai-Yu (Natalie Tong), who ends up being the younger sister of an affluent businessman at the company where Stella's brother-in-law works.

== Cast ==
Cast	Role	Description
Sunny Chan	Choi Ka-Sing 蔡嘉昇	Contractor; Yip Moon-Chi's lover.
Christine Ng	Yip Moon-Chi (Stella) 葉滿枝	Interior Designer; Choi Ka-Sing's lover.
Yuen Wah	Yip Cheung-Fat 葉長發	Yip Moon-Chi, Yip Shang-Shing, and Yip Moon-Lam's father.
Lai Lok-yi	Choi Ka-Bo 蔡嘉保	Choi Ka-Sing's younger brother. Yung Wai-Yu's lover.
Natalie Tong	Yung Wai-Yu 翁慧茹	Environmentalist; Choi Ka-Bo's lover. Yung Choh-Yu's younger sister.
Kingdom Yuen	Chu Lai-Ngoh 朱麗娥	Yip Shang-Shing's wife.
Makbau Mak	Yip Shang-Shing 葉常盛	Chu Lai-Ngoh's husband. Yip Moon-Chi and Yip Moon-Lam's older brother.
Mimi Lo	Yip Moon-Lam 葉滿琳	Hung Kwok-Wai's wife. Yip Moon-Chi and Yip Shang-Shing's younger sister.
Ben Wong	Hung Kwok-Wai 洪國偉	Yip Moon-Lam's husband.
Oscar Leung (梁烈唯)		
Law Lok Lam (羅樂林)	Choi Chik-Hei 蔡積喜	Choi Ka-Wing, Choi Ka-Sing and Choi Ka-Bo's father.
Law Koon Lan (羅冠蘭)	Wong Suk-Kuen 王淑娟	Choi Ka-Wing, Choi Ka-Sing and Choi Ka-Bo's mother.
Joel Chan	Yung Choh-Yu (Jason) 翁楚耀	Yung Wai-Yu's older brother.
Sherming Yiu (姚樂怡)	Grace	Yip Shang-Shing's mistress. Yip Moon-Lam's boss.
Akina Hong (康華)	Ah Hung 姚 虹	Single mother con artist. Introduced in Ep.14

== Viewership ratings ==
	Week	Episode	Average Points	Peaking Points	References
1	June 11–15, 2007	1 — 5	29	31	
2	June 18–22, 2007	6 — 10	30	33	
3	June 25–29, 2007	11 — 15	32	36	
4	July 2–6, 2007	16 — 20	33	36	

== Awards and nominations ==
40th TVB Anniversary Awards (2007)

- "Best Drama"
- "Best Actor in a Leading Role" (Sunny Chan - Choi Ka-Sing)
- "Best Actress in a Leading Role" (Christine Ng - Stella Yip Moon-Chi)
- "My Favourite Male Character Role" (Sunny Chan - Choi Ka-Sing)
- "My Favourite Female Character Role" (Christine Ng - Stella Yip Moon-Chi)
