= My Better Half (TV series) =

Hong Kong television series

- Official poster
- 老公萬歲
- Genre: Modern Comedy
- Starring: Michael Miu; Maggie Cheung; Michael Tse; Theresa Lee; Mandy Cho; Derek Kok; Mimi Lo; Oscar Leung
- Theme music composer: James Wong
- Opening theme: "大丈夫日記" by Michael Miu & Michael Tse
- Country of origin: Hong Kong
- Original language: Cantonese
- No. of episodes: 20

Production
- Producer: Terry Tong
- Running time: 45 minutes (approx.)

Original release
- Network: TVB
- Release: February 16 – March 16, 2010

My Better Half'
- Title screen shot
- Traditional Chinese: 老公萬歲
- Simplified Chinese: 老公万岁
Transcriptions
Standard Mandarin
- Hanyu Pinyin: Lǎo gōng wàn suì
Yue: Cantonese
- Jyutping: lou5 gung1 maan6 seoi3

My Better Half (Traditional Chinese: 老公萬歲) is a 2010 TVB modern comedy series.

== Synopsis ==
Pharmaceutical company employee Ching Sum (Michael Miu) has an overbearing wife, Ko Lai Sum (Maggie Cheung). In order not to fight head-on with her, he has been playing ostrich in their seven years of marriage.

Lai Sum, however, has never stopped watching his every move, as she always believes he is fooling around behind her back. Sum's younger brother, Ching Yee (Michael Tse), laughs at Sum a lot, but he also feels sorry for his plight, and gives him practical advice whenever he can. One day, Sum is caught red-handed in Shenzhen by Lai Sum, who proposes to divorce him!

Yee always claims he has never lost in the game of love, until he meets Miu Ling Chi, a newly recruited management staff of the company. Yee loses bitterly this time, and almost loses his job, too.

== Cast ==
=== Ching family ===
Cast	Role	Description
Michael Miu	Ching Sum 程琛	Ching Yi Cheung and Lam Bat Hang's son Ching Yee's older brother Ko Lai Sum's husband
Maggie Cheung	Ko Lai Sum 高勵心	Ching Sum's wife Ching Yi Cheung and Lam Bat Hang's daughter-in-law Ching Yee's sister-in-law Gam Ngan Fa's daughter
Michael Tse	Ching Yee 程義	Ching Yi Cheung and Lam Bat Hang's son Ching Sum's younger brother Miu Ling Ji's husband in episode 20
Chu Wai Tak (朱維德)	Ching Yi Cheung 程意祥	Lam Bat Hang's husband Ching Sum and Ching Yee's father
Suet Nei (雪妮)	Lam Bat Hang 藍畢珩	Ching Yi Cheung's wife Ching Sum and Ching Yee's mother

=== Other cast ===
Cast	Role	Description
Theresa Lee	Miu Ling Ji 繆靈芝	Ching Yee's wife in episode 20
Mandy Cho	Yau Ka Lei (Yuki) 尤嘉莉	Ching Yee's ex-girlfriend
Derek Kok	Kong San Sou 鄺辛訴	Poon Nei Sin's husband Ching Sum best friend
Mimi Lo (羅敏莊)	Poon Nei Sin 盤妮茜	Kong San Sou's wife
Oscar Leung (梁烈唯)	Hung Cheut Sek 孔爵錫	Sou Sin Hung's husband Ching Sum best friend
Grace Wong (王君馨)	Sou Sin Hung 蘇單虹	Hung Cheut Sek's Wife
Wu Fung	Lou Cheung Chun 魯長春	
Lee Fung (李楓)	Gam Ngan Fa 金銀花	Ko Lai Sum's mother
Jamie Chik	Nurse	Guest star episode 20

== Viewership ratings ==
	Week	Episodes	Average Points	Peaking Points	References
1	February 16–19, 2010	1 — 4	24	—	
2	February 22–26, 2010	5 — 9	25	—	
3	March 1–4, 2010	10 — 13	26	—	
4	March 8–12, 2010	14 — 18	25	—	
5	March 15–16, 2010	19 — 20	29	31	
