= The Comeback Clan =

- Official poster
- Also known as: The Comeback Family
- 翻叮一族
- Starring: Ha Yu; Benz Hui; Kiki Sheung; Christine Ng; Sammul Chan; Ngo Ka-nin; Shirley Yeung; Natalie Tong
- Opening theme: "八十前後" by 農夫
- Country of origin: Hong Kong
- Original language: Cantonese
- No. of episodes: 20

Production
- Producer: Kwan Wing-chung
- Production location: Hong Kong
- Editors: Choi Suk-yin; Yuen Siu-na; Lee Yee-wah
- Camera setup: Multi camera
- Running time: 45 minutes
- Production company: TVB

Original release
- Network: TVB Jade
- Release: September 20 – October 15, 2010

The Comeback Clan (Chinese: 翻叮一族; jyutping: faan1 ding1 jat1 zuk6; pinyin: fān dīng yī zú) is a 2010 Hong Kong TVB television drama starring Ha Yu, Benz Hui, Kiki Sheung, Christine Ng and Sammul Chan.

Produced by Kwan Wing-chung and co-edited by Choi Suk-yin, Yuen Siu-na, and Lee Yee-wah, the first episode premiered on 20 September 2010.

== Synopsis ==
Tung (Ha Yu) saved the Lei family when they were in financial trouble. However the daughters of the Lei family grew up thinking Tung caused them to go bankrupt. They grew up in an unhappy childhood, while Tung appeared to walk off with their family's wealth.

Lei Yung-chi (Christine Ng) grows up and become a finance expert. She plots a revenge and caused Tung to go bankrupt through his Mei Sik Yuen restaurant only to discover later he really was a savior.

== Cast ==
=== Dai family ===
Cast	Role	Description
Ha Yu	Dai Koo-tung 戴顧東	Boss of Mei Sik Yuen Restaurant; Ex-boss of Chi Mei Chu Restaurant later Dai Ying-lei's father Loves Lei Yung-chi
Natalie Tong	Dai Ying-lei 戴瑩莉	Gabe; Assistant Corporate Officer of Wei's Group; Dai Koo-tung's daughter Yip Chik-leung's girlfriend, broke up in Chapter 15, patched up and married in Chapter 20; Wei Chi-on's subordinate, and girlfriend later, but broke up in Chapter 19; Lei Yung-shan's friend and love rival Eva and Lei Yung-chi's subordinate

=== Yip family ===
Cast	Role	Description
Benz Hui	Yip Mo-sing 葉慕昇	Former deputy manager of clubhouse restaurant Ex-shareholder of Mei Sik Yuen Restaurant; Ex-boss of Mei Sik Yuen Restaurant; Yip Chik-leung's father Loves Tsui Hei-hei, married in Chapter 20 (Semi-villain)
Kiki Sheung	Tsui Hei-hei 崔喜喜	Ngai Chun-chong's ex-wife Ngai Chi-on's aunt Yip Chik-leung's stepmother Became acting-chairman of Ngai's Group in Chapter 19; Loves Yip Mo-sing, married in Chapter 20; Suffered from amnesia and used to believe Yip Mo-sing is her husband, Yip Chik-leung is her son and Dai Koo-tung is her cousin
Sammul Chan	Yip Chik-leung 葉積良; Glenn	Cellist; Yip Mo-sing's son Tsui Hei-hei's stepson Dai Ying-lei's boyfriend, broke up in Chapter 15, patched up and married in Chapter 20; Lei Yung-shan's boyfriend, but broke up in Chapter 20; Wei Chi-on's love rival

=== Lei family ===
Cast	Role	Description
Peter Pang	Lei Tat-lei 利達利	Ex-shareholder of Mei Sik Yuen Restaurant; Lei Yung-chi and Lei Yung-shan's father Deceased
Christine Ng	Lei Yung-chi 利蓉姿; Kay	Ex-shareholder of Mei Sik Yuen Restaurant; Shareholder of Chi Mei Chu Restaurant later Former deputy investment manager of Ching Kong Bank; Investment manager of Wei's Group, promoted to manager director in Chapter 20; Lei Tat-lei's daughter Lei Yung-shan's elder sister Lau Fa's granddaughter Ka Po-law's subordinate and girlfriend, later broke up in Chapter 2 Dai Ying-lei's supervisor (Semi-villain)
Shirley Yeung	Lei Yung-shan 利蓉珊; Justina	Lei Tat-lei's daughter Lei Yung-chi's younger sister Lau Fa's granddaughter Yip Chik-leung's girlfriend, but broke up in Chapter 20; Dai Ying-lei's friend and love rival

=== Ngai family ===
Cast	Role	Description
Felix Lok	Ngai Chun-chong 危振滄	Chairman of Ngai's Group; Largest shareholder of Mei Sik Yuen Restaurant later Ngai Chi-on's uncle and adopter father Tsui Hei-hei's ex-husband Was in coma after dispute with Ngai Chi-on in Chapter 16; Became conscious in Chapter 20
Ngo Ka-nin	Ngai Chi-on 危賜安; Horace	CEO of Ngai's Group, but deposed by Tsui Hei-hei in Chapter 19; Ngai Chun-chong's nephew and adopted son Tsui Hei-hei's nephew Colluded with Chow Lin and Ka Po-law; Dai Ying-lei's boss, and boyfriend later, but broke up in Chapter 19; Became a fugitive in Chapter 19, arrested and jailed in Chapter 20; Yip Chik-leung's love rival (Main villain)

=== Mei Sik Yuen Restaurant ===
Cast	Role	Description
Ha Yu	Dai Koo-tung 戴顧東	Boss and largest shareholder Cheated by Lei Yung-chi and sold all his shares in Chapter 11; Bought back the shares and jointly operated with Ngai's Group in Chapter 20
Benz Hui	Yip Mo-sing 葉慕昇	Shareholder; Appointed by Ngai Chun-chong to become the boss in Chapter 11; Shares acquired by Ngai Chi-on in Chapter 16
Christine Ng	Lei Yung-chi 利蓉姿	Shareholder; Sold all her shares to Ngai Chun-chong in Chapter 11
Sammul Chan	Yip Chik-leung 葉積良	Waiter
Shirley Yeung	Lei Yung-shan 利蓉珊	Cook
Mannor Chan	Lam Kiu 林嬌	Waitress; Retired in Chapter 20
Eddie Li	Chan Ka-kuen 陳家權	Waiter
Yeung Ming	Chung Ching 鍾正	Waiter
Sin Ho Ying	Lo Por-fuk 盧波福	Cook
Peter Lai	Ar For 阿火	Cook
Candy Chu	To King-sze 杜瓊詩	Cashier

=== Chi Mei Chu Restaurant ===
Cast	Role	Description
Ha Yu	Dai Koo-tung 戴顧東	Boss
Christine Ng	Lei Yung-chi 利蓉姿	Shareholder
Kiki Sheung	Tsui Hei-hei 崔喜喜	Cook
Sammul Chan	Yip Chik-leung 葉積良	Waiter
Shirley Yeung	Lei Yung-shan 利蓉珊	Waitress

=== Other casts ===
Cast	Role	Description
Wong Ching	Chow Nin 周年	Ngai Chun-chong's assistant Colluded with Ngai Chi-on; Fired by Tsui Hei-hei in Chapter 19 (Villain)
Ben Wong	Ka Po-law 賈保羅; Paul	Investment manager of Ching Kong Bank; Responsible for privatization of Ngai's Group later Lei Yung-chi's supervisor and boyfriend, later break up Colluded with Ngai Chi-on; Fired by Tsui Hei-hei in Chapter 19 (Villain)
Lily Poon	Eva	Corporate Manager of Ngai's Group; Dai Ying-lei's supervisor Counters Dai Ying-lei
Teresa Ha	Lau Fa 劉花	Lei Yung-chi and Lei Yung-shan's grandmother
Tai Chi Wai	Mr. Ho	Manager of clubhouse restaurant Yip Mo-sing's former supervisor and enemy Fired Yip Mo-sing in Chapter 1
Kwok Tak Shun	Lee Yau-yau 李友友	Famous cellist Yip Chik-leung's master
Chun Wong	Uncle Chan 陳伯	An entrepreneur and a philanthropist

== Viewership ratings ==
	Week	Episodes	Average Points	Peaking Points	References
1	September 20–24, 2010	1 — 5	25	29	
2	September 27 - October 1, 2010	6 — 10	25	29	
3	October 4–8, 2010	11 — 15	26	—	
4	October 11–15, 2010	16 — 20	27	31	
