= A Bride for a Ride =

Hong Kong television series

- Official poster
- 王老虎搶親
- Genre: Costume drama Comedy; Action
- Written by: Chan Kam-ling; Choi Suk-yin
- Starring: Chin Kar-lok; Sammul Chan; Louisa So; Nancy Wu; Gigi Wong; Rain Lau; Joseph Lee; Mimi Chu; Cheung Kwok-keung
- Opening theme: Hap Fat Cheung Chan (合法搶親)performed by Chin Kar-lok, Sammul Chan, Wong Cho-lam
- Composer: Chow Wing-hang
- Country of origin: Hong Kong
- Original language: Cantonese
- No. of episodes: 21

Production
- Executive producer: Poon Ka-tak
- Production location: Hong Kong
- Camera setup: Multi camera
- Running time: 45 minutes (per episode)
- Production company: TVB

Original release
- Network: TVB Jade
- Release: 13 July – 9 August 2009

A Bride for a Ride
- Traditional Chinese: 王老虎搶親
- Simplified Chinese: 王老虎抢亲
- Literal meaning: "Tiger Wong Snatches a Bride"
Transcriptions
Standard Mandarin
- Hanyu Pinyin: Wáng Lǎo Hǔ Qiǎng Qīn
Yue: Cantonese
- Jyutping: Wong4 Lou5 Fu2 Cheung2 Chan1

A Bride for a Ride is a 2009 Hong Kong television series based on the traditional Pingtan story of the same name. Set during the prosperous Ming dynasty of China, the drama revolves around the rich and influential Wong family and their comedic ties with Chow Man-bun, a young and handsome scholar who has a specialty in cross-dressing. To prove his worth to Wong Sau-ying, his ideal lover, he cross dresses as a beauty in a lantern festival so he can get closer to her. Sau-ying's older brother, Tiger Wong, sees Man-bun's beauty and kidnaps him home. A Bride for a Ride consists of elements of Cantonese opera. Chin Kar-lok, who stars as Tiger Wong, is also the drama's action choreographer.

== Synopsis ==
Foolhardy Tiger Wong (Chin) is annoyed with his mother (Wong) for consistently pressuring him to get married. He therefore snatches Chow Man-bun (Chan) who is in female disguise to be his bride and arranges for Man-bun to stay at his younger sister Sau-ying's (Wu) chamber for the night. After this, Tiger has no choice but to marry Sau-ying to Man-bun while setting up strict rules to torture Man-bun in the house. Clever Man-bun makes use of the chivalrous woman Mo Sam-leung (So) to control Tiger and misleads Sam-leung that Tiger is her long lost rescuer. Using tricks to upset Tiger, he makes Tiger marry Sam-leung. Since then, Sam-leung tries every means to domesticate her husband and that almost drives him insane. Man-bun is relieved to escape Tiger's manipulation but he carelessly causes much trouble elsewhere. A Bride for A Ride brings you a modern perspective of this traditional tale and you'll surely be surprised with its astonishing approach.

== Cast ==
Note: Some of the characters' names are in Cantonese romanisation.

- Chin Kar-lok as Tiger Wong
- Sammul Chan as Chow Man-bun
- Louisa So as Mo Sam-leung
- Joseph Lee as Chuk Chi-shan
- Nancy Wu as Wong Sau-ying
- Rain Lau as Wong Kwai-fei
- Gigi Wong as Lau Bing-tai
- Mimi Chu as Sheung Ping
- Cheung Kwok-keung as Lau Gan
- Nicky Law as Ching-tak Emperor
- Catherine Chau as So-kam
- Chun Wong as Magistrate Bei Mat
- Natalie Wong as Lee Fung
- Deno Cheung as Lee Lung
- Macy Chan as Sze Mung-lo
- Wong Man Piu as the Prince of Ning

== Viewership ratings ==
The following is a table that includes a list of the total ratings points based on television viewership. "Viewers in millions" refers to the number of people, derived from TVB Jade ratings (not including TVB HD Jade), in Hong Kong who watched the episode live. The peak number of viewers are in brackets.

| Week | Episode(s) | Average points | Peaking points | Viewers (in millions) | AI | References |
|---|---|---|---|---|---|---|
| 1 | 1 — 5 | 30 | 34 | 1.92 (2.17) | — | |
| 2 | 6 — 10 | 29 | 32 | 1.85 (2.04) | 83% | |
| 3 | 11 — 15 | 29 | — | 1.85 ( — ) | 81% | |
| 4 | 16 — 20 | 31 | 33 | 1.98 (2.10) | 82% | |
| 4 | 21 | 31 | 32 | 1.98 (2.04) | — | |

== Awards and nominations ==
TVB Anniversary Awards (2009)

- Best Drama
- Best Actor (Chin Kar Lok)
- My Favourite Male Character (Chin Kar Lok)
