= The Voice (Hong Kong TV series) =

- Logo for season 1.
- The Voice 超級巨聲
- Presented by: Prudence Liew (Season 1); Sammy Leung (Season 2–present); Kristal Tin (Season 2–present)
- Judges: see list within sections
- Country of origin: Hong Kong
- No. of seasons: 4
- No. of episodes: 76

Production
- Executive producer: Stephen Chan Chi Wan (Seasons 1–2)
- Production locations: TVB City, Hong Kong
- Running time: 90 minutes (including commercials)
- Production company: Television Broadcasts Limited

Original release
- Network: Television Broadcasts Limited
- Release: July 19, 2009 – January 31, 2015

The Voice (Chinese: 超級巨聲) is a Hong Kong reality show style singing competition broadcast by TVB, and also selects Hong Kong's representative to the New Talent Singing Awards International Finals.

The first season was presented by cantopop singer Prudence Liew and aired from July 19, 2009 to February 7, 2010. Wen Wang (王雯) was the winner. Sammy Leung and Kristal Tin were the main presenters starting season two, which aired May 9, 2010 to September 12, 2010. Mag Lam was the winner. Season 3 premiered on August 14, 2011 following the conclusion of the talk show, Say What (吹水同鄉會).

== Format ==
Contestants sing one song per round of competition, which depending on the length, will be broadcast within one or two episodes. After their individual performances, a panel of judges (between four and six, depending on the round) will critique and score each contestant. During the first half of the season, the scoring structure is on a five-point scale, with the final score being the sum of the judges total. As for the latter half of the season, each judge can award up to 100 points, with the final score being the average of the judges' scores.

Depending on the round of competition, contestants are eliminated based on one of three pre-set criteria:

- Having a set number of the lowest scoring contestants (usually between two and four) eliminated;
- Having a minimum score threshold where a contestant must achieve in order to survive the round;
- In dual rounds, contestants that score lower than their challengers are eliminated. If two contestants are battling against each other, the lower scoring contestant is eliminated.

However, there are some rounds where no contestants are eliminated and instead they are competing for prizes.

== Season 1 (2009–2010) ==
An open audition call selects 100 contestants to enter the preliminaries of the show, which is broadcast in the first episode of the program. From there, the six judges responsible for the preliminaries each select five contestants as the final 30 to be on the show.

At the halfway point of the season, contestants eliminated during the first half had an opportunity to re-join the competition in what is called "The Resurrection Battle". During this round, the four highest scoring contestants are re-instated in the competition.

=== Guest presenters ===
- Gary Chaw (Episodes 4–6; 28)
- Sammy Leung (Episodes 7–11; 28; Graduation concert)
- Louis Cheung (Episodes 12, 16–28; Graduation concert)
- Amigo Choi (Episodes 13–15)
- Harlem Yu (Episodes 24–25)
- King Kong (Episodes 26–27)

Season 1 main presenter Prudence Liew was relieved of her hosting duties as of episode 26. Liew, who is signed under the Universal Music Group label Cinepoly Records, is part of the group of cantopop singers banned from appearing on TVB programming as part of the conflict between the television station and the Hong Kong Recording Industry Alliance over song royalties. Her replacement presenter for episodes 26 to 27 was Hong Kong based Taiwanese presenter King Kong (金剛).

=== Judges ===
Name	Occupation and Notability	Origin	Episodes judged
Kenny Bee 鍾鎮濤	cantopop singer	Hong Kong	20, 21, 22, 23, 24, 25
Eliza Chan 陳潔靈	80's cantopop singer	Hong Kong	7, 8, 9, 10, 11, 12, 13, 18, 19, 20, 21, 22, 23, 26, 27, 28
Hins Cheung 張敬軒	cantopop singer	Hong Kong	10, 11
Tsang Hei Chiu 趙增熹	composer, producer	Hong Kong	4, 5, 6, 7, 8, 9, 12, 13, 14, 15, 16, 17, 18, 19, 24, 25, 28
Jam Hsiao 蕭敬騰	mandopop singer	Taiwan	7
Guo Lun Huang 黃國倫	composer, producer, TV presenter, occasional mandopop singer	Taiwan	20, 21, 22, 23, 24, 25
Leo Ku 古巨基	cantopop singer	Hong Kong	1, 2, 3
Eric Kwok 郭偉亮	member of Swing, composer, producer	Hong Kong	1, 14, 15
Hacken Lee 李克勤	cantopop singer	Hong Kong	16
Edmond Leung 梁漢文	cantopop singer	Hong Kong	4, 5, 6, 17
James Li 李 泉	mandopop singer-songwriter	China	16, 17, 18, 19, 20, 21, 22, 23, 24, 25, 26, 27, 28
Justin Lo 側 田	cantopop singer	Hong Kong	1, 2, 3, 4, 5, 6
David Lui 呂 方	cantopop singer, New Talent Singing Awards winner	Hong Kong	2, 3, 4, 5
Mark Lui 雷頌德	composer, producer, occasional cantopop singer	Hong Kong	7, 8, 9, 10, 11, 12, 13, 14, 15, 26, 27, 28
Anthony Lun 倫永亮	cantopop singer-songwriter, producer	Hong Kong	18, 19, 20, 21, 22, 23, 26, 27, 28
Kitman Mak 麥潔文	80's cantopop singer	Hong Kong	16, 17
Pong Nan 藍奕邦	cantopop singer-songwriter	Hong Kong	1, 2, 3, 7, 8, 9, 10, 11, 14, 15, 16, 18, 19
Ronald Ng 伍樂城	composer, producer	Hong Kong	1, 2, 3
William So 蘇永康	cantopop and jazz singer	Hong Kong	13
Joey Tang 鄧建明	member of Tai Chi, guitarist, composer	Hong Kong	14, 15, 17
Kay Tse 謝安琪	cantopop singer	Hong Kong	1
Xiao Fang Wang 王曉鋒	composer, producer	China	4, 5
Ivana Wong 王菀之	cantopop singer-songwriter	Hong Kong	6, 10, 11
Frances Yip 葉麗儀	80's cantopop singer	Hong Kong	12, 13

=== Results ===
- Winner: Wen Wang 王 雯
- First Runner-Up: Cherry Ho 何紫慧
- Second Runner-Up: Wen Chao 趙 文
- Most Outstanding Singer Award: Cherry Ho 何紫慧
- Most Popular Award: Alfred Hui 許廷鏗
- Most Vastly Improved Award: Auston Lam 林師傑
- Most Moving Performance Award: Wei Han 韓 煒
- Hong Kong's Representative to International Chinese New Talent Singing Championship 2009: Hong Kin Chan 陳康健
  - Hong Kin Chan pulled out of competing at New Talent due to sickness, therefore no Hong Kong representative competed in the contest for the first time in the history of New Talent Singing Awards.

During episodes 16 to 20 of season one, several singing competition winners from Mainland China and Taiwan challenged the original Hong Kong contestants in a dual round. Each challenger battled against two local contestants. If the challenger can win both rounds or at least win one round and tie one round, they were then invited to compete in The Voice for the remainder of the season. Two of these challengers ended up in the top three at the end of season one, with Wen Wang 王雯 winning the competition and Wen Chao 趙文 in third place.

== Season 2 (2010) ==
The show went through a makeover for season 2. The major difference being the open audition call now selects twenty contestants, cancelling the preliminary round of 100 competitors. The season premiere began with these twenty contestants. Also, no Resurrection Battle took place this season.

=== Guest presenters ===
- Mimi Lo (Episode 13)
- Louis Yuen (Episode 16-17)

=== Judges ===
Name	Occupation and Notability	Origin	Episodes judged
Kenny Bee 鍾鎮濤	cantopop singer	Hong Kong	1, 2, 3, 4, 5, 6
Teresa Carpio 杜麗莎	Season 2 Head Vocal Coach; 80's cantopop singer, vocal coach	Hong Kong	1, 2, 3, 4, 5, 15, 16, 17
Janae Chan	Image consultant and makeup artist	Hong Kong	7, 8
Eliza Chan 陳潔靈	Season 2 Head Judge; 80's cantopop singer	Hong Kong	1, 2, 3, 4, 5, 6, 7, 8, 11, 12, 13, 14, 15, 16, 17, 18
Tsang Hei Chiu 趙增熹	composer, producer	Hong Kong	1, 2, 3, 4, 5, 9, 10, 11, 12, 13, 14, 15, 16, 17, 18
Anthony Lun 倫永亮	cantopop singer-songwriter, producer	Hong Kong	all episodes ( 1-18 )
Pal Sinn 單立文	cantopop singer-songwriter, bassist, member of 80's Hong Kong rock band "Blue Jeans"	Hong Kong	6, 7, 8, 9, 10, 15, 16, 17
Danny Summer 夏韶聲	cantopop singer-songwriter	Hong Kong	9, 10, 11, 12, 18
Hanjin Tan 陳奐仁	hip-hop singer-songwriter, rapper, producer	Singapore	6, 7, 8, 9, 10, 11, 12, 13, 14, 15, 18
Ruth Tseng 曾路得	Folk singer, vocal coach	Hong Kong	13, 14, 18

=== Results ===
- Winner: (15) Mag Lam 林欣彤
- First Runner-Up: (4) Hubert Wu 胡鴻鈞
- Second Runner-Up: (6) Sheldon Lo 羅孝勇
- Internet Popularity Award: (15) Mag Lam 林欣彤
- Most Vastly Improved Award: (4) Hubert Wu 胡鴻鈞
- Favourite Song Performance Award:
  - (15) Mag Lam 林欣彤 performing "愛請問怎麼走"
  - (10) James Ng 吳業坤 performing "夢一場"
  - (7) Vivian Chan 陳慧敏 performing "歲月的童話"
- Hong Kong's Representative to International Chinese New Talent Singing Championship 2010: (4) Hubert Wu 胡鴻鈞

== Season 3 (2011) ==
Season 3 saw some minor changes in the rules and regulations. An age restriction was added limiting applicants to between the ages of 15 and 30. Also, vocal group entries of up to eight people are now allowed to compete. The season premiere was aired on August 14, 2011 and began with 18 contestants.

=== Judges ===
Name	Occupation and Notability	Origin	Episodes judged
Eliza Chan 陳潔靈	Season 3 Head Judge; 80's cantopop singer	Hong Kong	1, 2, 3, 4, 5, 6, 9, 10
Tsang Hei Chiu 趙增熹	composer, producer	Hong Kong	1, 2, 3, 4, 5, 6, 7, 8, 9, 10, 11
Anthony Lun 倫永亮	cantopop singer-songwriter, producer	Hong Kong	1, 2, 3, 4, 5, 6, 7, 8, 11
Joventino Couto Remotigue (Jun Kung) 恭碩良	singer-songwriter, drummer, producer	Hong Kong, Macau	1, 2, 3, 4, 11
CoCo Lee 李玟	singer, songwriter, actress	Hong Kong	1, 7, 8
Hanjin Tan 陳奐仁	hip-hop singer-songwriter, rapper, producer	Singapore	2, 3, 4, 5, 6, 7, 8, 9, 10, 11
Keith Chan 陳輝陽	composer	Hong Kong	5, 6, 7, 8, 11
Danny Summer 夏韶聲	cantopop singer-songwriter	Hong Kong	9, 10, 11
Ruth Tseng 曾路得	Folk singer, vocal coach	Hong Kong	9, 10

=== Results ===
- Winner: (18) Jerry Liu 廖仲謙
- First Runner-Up: (1) Jay Fung 馮允謙
- Second Runner-Up: (3) Carrie Tam 譚嘉儀
- Internet Popularity Award: (1) Jay Fung 馮允謙
- Most Vastly Improved Award: (3) Carrie Tam 譚嘉儀
- Favourite Song Performance Award:
  - (1) Jay Fung 馮允謙 ft. Sheldon Lo 羅孝勇 performing "I'm Yours"
  - (18) Jerry Liu 廖仲謙 performing "我的天"
  - (3) Carrie Tam 譚嘉儀 performing "多得他"
- Hong Kong's Representative to International Chinese New Talent Singing Championship 2011: (18) Jerry Liu 廖仲謙

== See also ==
- New Talent Singing Awards
- One Million Star
- Super Girl (contest)
- Super Boy (contest)
- Minutes to Fame
- The Voice (franchise)
