= Anthony Lun =

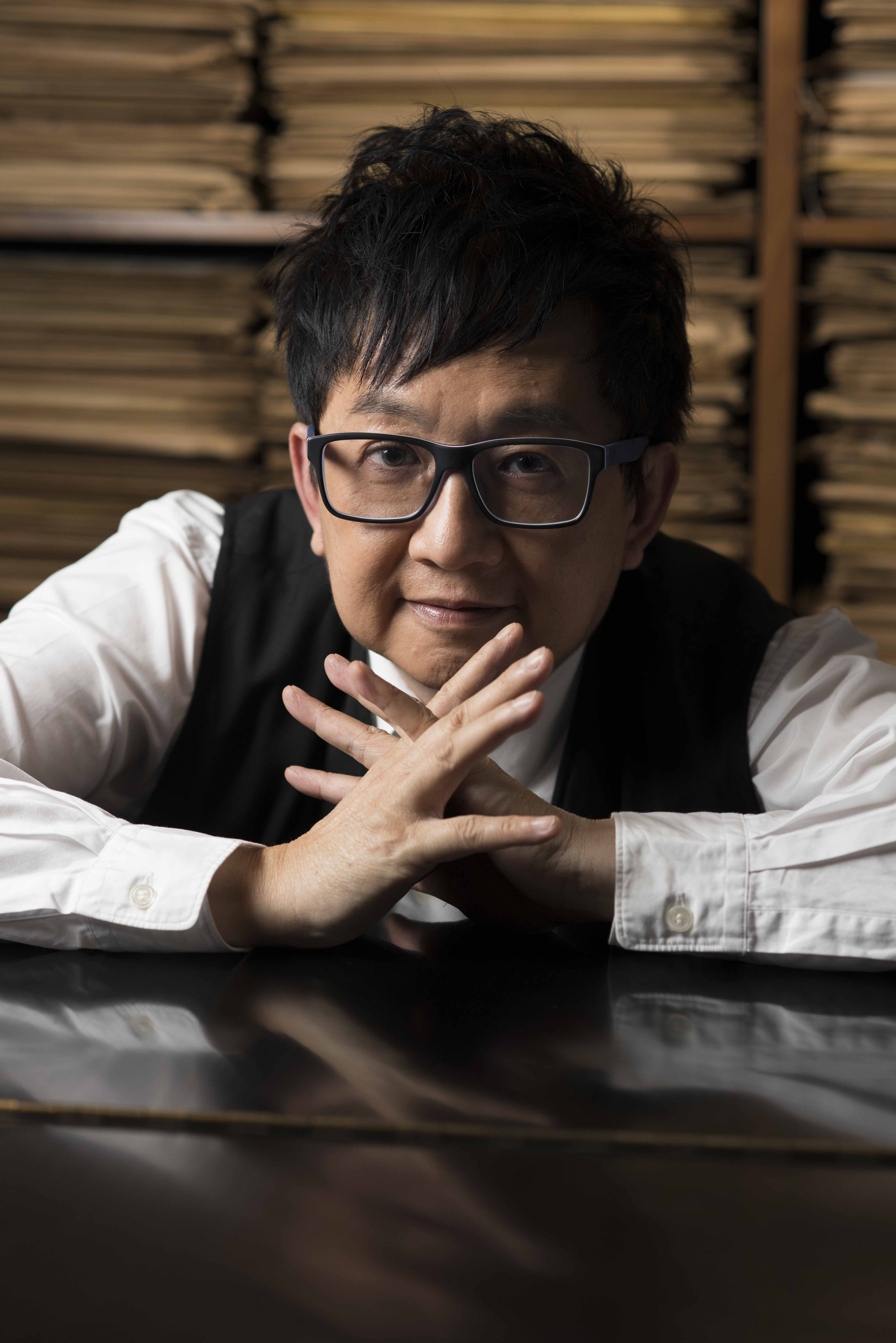
- Born: 12 April 1956 (age 70); Hong Kong
- Education: Bachelor : University of Santa Clara
- Alma mater: University of Michigan
- Occupations: Songwriter, arranger, musical director, singer
- Years active: 1986–present

Chinese name
- Traditional Chinese: 倫永亮
- Simplified Chinese: 伦永亮
Transcriptions
Standard Mandarin
- Hanyu Pinyin: lún yông liàng
Yue: Cantonese
- Jyutping: leon4 wing5 loeng6
- Musical career
- Origin: Hong Kong
- Genres: Cantopop
- Instruments: piano, violin, percussions
- Labels: Capital Artists, Bali Records Company, Golden Pony, Pony Canyon, Universal Music (HK), EMI, Opus Forever Music

Anthony Lun (born 12 April 1957) is a Hong Kong songwriter, arranger, musical director and singer who sings in Cantonese, Mandarin, Japanese and English.

Lun represented Hong Kong at the 1986 ABU Popular Song Contest.

== Biography ==
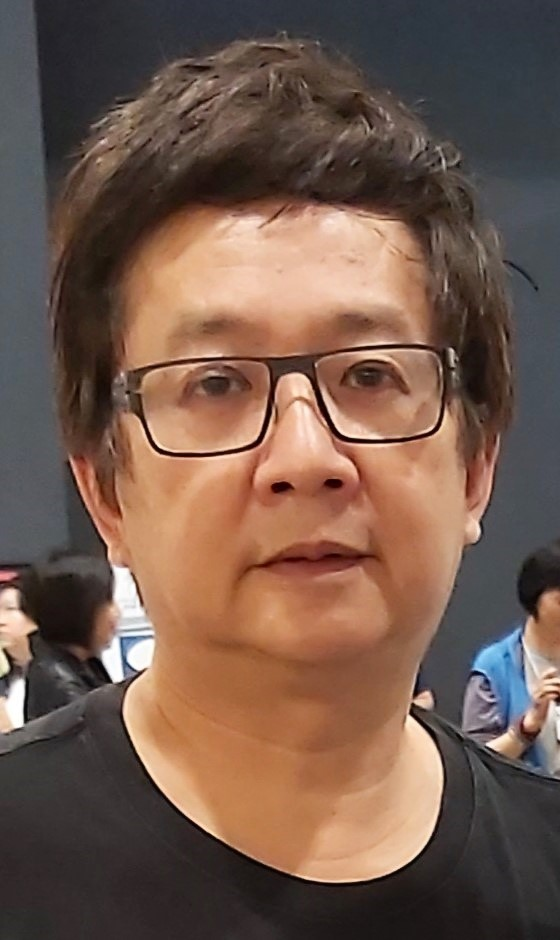
Lun at the Hong Kong Book Fair 2019 on 20 July 2019

Anthony Lun is a graduate of La Salle College, Santa Clara University (Bachelor of Arts) and University of Michigan (Masters of Music).

Upon returning to Hong Kong in 1986, Anthony released an album, Anthony Lun's Composition Collection. He entered the ABU Popular Song Contest at the invitation of Poon Kwong Pui, who wrote the song "Lyrics". In 1990, he released an album called "Man Behind The Piano"; his song of the same name became a hit.

Between 1989 and 1997, Lun composed over 300 songs, with 42 No. 1 hits. He composed songs performed by artists including Jackie Chan, Faye Wong, Sandy Lam, Anita Mui, Andy Lau, Aaron Kwok, Lui Fong, Alex To, Elisa Chan and Cass Phang.

In 1991, Lun won the Golden Horse Film Festival and Awards in the Best Movie Theme category for the soundtrack of the movie "Au Revoir, Mon Amour" (Till We Meet Again). Its theme song, "何日" (When), was sung by Anita Mui. In 2001, he also composed the score for an award-winning movie Peony Pavilion (遊園驚夢).

In 2004, he held a concert, "HKPO x Sandy x Anthony LIVE", with Sandy Lam at the Hong Kong Coliseum featuring the Hong Kong Philharmonic Orchestra.

Apart from working with good friend Sandy Lam, Lun is also known for his musical direction (for concerts) with Anita Mui, Andy Lau, Connie Chan Po-chu, Deanie Yip, Leon Lai, Sally Yeh and George Lam.

In 2005, Lun and Taiwanese composer Jonathan Lee produced a theme song for the 2004 Indian Ocean earthquake relief benefit performance organised by the Hong Kong Performing Artistes Guild. In 2006, Anthony Lun returned to Hong Kong Coliseum in April for 2 solo concerts.

In November 2007, Anthony made his acting debut on the theater stage in a play called "Far Flower World". The play was staged for 8 consecutive shows at APA in March 2008 with an all sold-out performances.

In 2008, Lun's first full musical, titled "Snow Queen", was staged in May at Kwai Tsing Theater. Lun wrote and orchestrated the music, with librettos by Chris Shum. The musical was based on a Hans Christian Andersen fairy tale. In 2009, Lun began touring with Sandy Lam as her musical director and her guest in the concerts.

In 2009, Lun was part of the judging panel for season one of The Voice on TVB.

In 2013, Lun received the Hall Of Fame lifetime achievement award presented by the Composers and Authors Society of Hong Kong.

== Discography ==
- 1986 – "Seek" (Kongo's)
- 1986 – "Lyrics" (Capital Artists)
- 1987 – "Anthony Lun" (Capital Artists)
- 1990 – "Man Behind The Piano" (Bali Records)
- 1990 – "Cheers For Love" (Bali Records)
- 1992 – "One Voice Ten Fingers" (Golden Pony)
- 1993 – "One Alone on the Road" (Golden Pony)
- 1993 – "One Voice Ten Fingers" (Pony Canyon)
- 1994 – "Time" (Golden Pony)
- 1994 – "Listen" (Golden Pony)
- 1995 – "Fields Of Heart" (Golden Pony)
- 1995 – "Looking Glass" (Pony Canyon)
- 1996 – "Second Life" (Golden Pony)
- 1996 – "Don't Compare" (Pony Canyon)
- 1997 – "A Song For You" (Golden Pony)
- 1999 – "New Songs and Best Hits" (Golden Pony)
- 1999 – "Summer of 1999" (Yamaha Records)
- 2000 – "The Red Boat" (Hero Idea)
- 2001 – "Anthony Lun Greatest Hits" (Golden Pony)
- 2003 – "A Song For You" (Golden Pony)
- 2003 – "Autumn Night" (EMI)
- 2004 – "Under The Roof," Live concert for DVD (EMI)
- 2006 – "A Feeling Unsung" (Go East)
- 2007 – "Live at Hong Kong Coliseum" DVD, CD (Opus Forever)
- 2010 – The Best Of Best (Forward Music)
