= YesAsia =

Online retailer of Asian entertainment products

YesAsia.com, Inc.
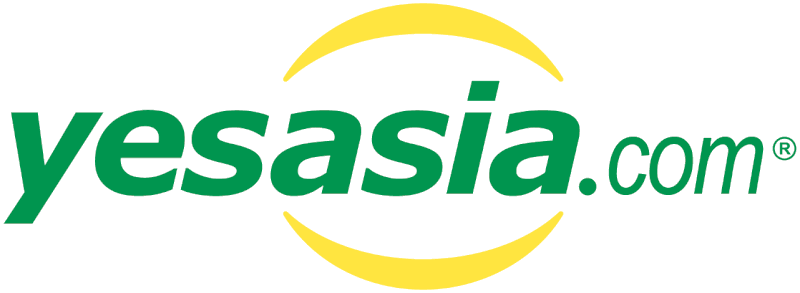
- Company type: Private
- Website type: E-commerce
- Available in: English, Chinese, Japanese, Korean
- Founded: 1998
- Headquarters: Hong Kong, Japan, South Korea, United States
- Area served: Worldwide
- Founders: Joshua K. Lau, Priscilla Chu
- Industry: Online retail, B2C
- Products: DVDs, music, books, electronics & gadgets, video games
- Website: www.yesasia.com

YesAsia (formerly AsiaCD) is an online retail company founded in 1998 that sells Asian entertainment products worldwide. After initially focusing on CD and video retailing, it has expanded into other entertainment and hobby products such as manga, video games and consoles, electronics and toys.

Its website includes Asian entertainment news, music and film reviews, and pop charts from Hong Kong, Taiwan, Korea and Japan.

Since 2006, it has continually been listed in Internet Retailer's Top 500 e-commerce websites.

== History ==
YesAsia was founded in 1998 as AsiaCD by Joshua K. Lau and Priscilla Chu in San Francisco, California. The company later moved its headquarters and fulfillment center to Hong Kong to better facilitate logistics handling of the Asian entertainment products carried by the website. It has regional offices in Tokyo and Seoul.

In 2001, YesAsia formed a strategic alliance with EMI to sell the latter's Asian media products in North America. It also has partnerships with Sony Music Entertainment, Universal Music, Warner Music, and Japan-based Avex Group. In the same year, it acquired Angel Pop, an online competitor that sold Korean products.

In 2003, it gained market share in Hong Kong faster than its internet rivals such as Amazon when online shopping grew in popularity during the SARS outbreak. Because of its specialized niche in entertainment products, YesAsia managed to grow in the U.S. market even when other Asian online retailers crashed after the dot-com meltdown. In 2004 it had about $13 million in U.S. online sales, which was 50% higher than its sales in 2003.

YesStyle, its sister website

In 2006, it expanded into Asian fashion apparel products sourced from Korea, Japan, China, Taiwan, and Hong Kong by opening fashion e-commerce retail website, YesStyle. The new division achieved 800,000 visits and sales of $512,000 in its first six months. It sells apparel, jewelry, accessories, bags, beauty and other fashion products, targeting men and women aged 18 to 35. One year after its establishment, it added a children and babies section in its product offerings. In 2009 the first YesStyle Store was opened in Stonestown Galleria in San Francisco.

YesAsia was one of Internet Retailer's Top 50 "Best of the Web" retail sites for 2007. The reviewer found that YesAsia was set apart by "its ability to create a sense of Asian community not only in its catalog of products but in its look and feel."

In 2010, YesAsia formed an official partnership with the Korean entertainment news website Allkpop.

As of 2011 it is listed as number 295 in Internet Retailer's Top 500 B2C websites, with annual online sales of $34,933,000, and growth in 2010 of 26.9%.

In May 2022, YesStyle joined together with Geek+ to create its first Smart Warehouse in Hong Kong.
