= The White Flame =

Hong Kong medical drama

- Also known as: Baiyi Tianshi
- Starring: Charmaine Sheh; Sammul Chan
- Country of origin: China

Original release
- Release: 2004

The White Flame (traditional Chinese: 紅衣手記; simplified Chinese: 红衣手记), known alternatively as Baiyi Tianshi Chinese: 白衣天使), is a 2004 Hong Kong medical drama centered on nurses, filmed by TVB in 2001 and released overseas in March 2002. The series stars Charmaine Sheh and Sammul Chan (his first as male lead).

== Cast ==
1. Charmaine Sheh as Charlie Yoh Choi Ling (郁采玲)
2. Sammul Chan as Yung Dak Gei (容德基)
3. Lily Hong as Crystal Ko Hiu Lam (高曉嵐)
4. Claire Yiu as Fung Siu Mei (馮少媚)
5. Casper Chan (陳凱怡) as Lo Bo Bo (盧布布)
6. Ling Chi Heen (凌子軒) as Chan Ka Lok (陳家樂)
7. Kingdom Yuen as Koo Mei Lan (辜美蘭)
8. Benz Hui 飾 Yoh Sai Hoi(郁四海)
9. Law Koon Lan (羅冠蘭) as Yoh Loi Fun (郁魯芬)
10. Gregory Lee Wing Ho as Man Kin Fai (文建輝)

== Guest stars ==
1. Raymond Cho Wing Lim as Chris Heung Jong Yan (向眾仁)
2. Maggie Shiu as Anson Man On Sang (萬安生)
3. Kenneth Ma as A & E doctor
