= You're Hired (TV series) =

Hong Kong television series

- Official poster
- 絕代商驕
- Genre: Modern Comedy
- Written by: Chu King Kei; Suen Ho Ho
- Starring: Dayo Wong; Charmaine Sheh; Theresa Lee; Benz Hui; Michael Tse; Power Chan; Mandy Cho
- Opening theme: "冇問題" No Problem by Dayo Wong
- Country of origin: Hong Kong
- Original languages: Cantonese; Mandarin
- No. of episodes: 20 (22 overseas)

Production
- Producer: Cheung Kin Man
- Running time: 45 minutes (approx.)

Original release
- Network: TVB
- Release: August 10 – September 5, 2009

You're Hired
- Traditional Chinese: 絕代商驕
- Simplified Chinese: 绝代商骄
Transcriptions

You're Hired (Traditional Chinese: 絕代商驕) is a TVB modern comedy series released in 2009.

== Synopsis ==
A previously successful entrepreneur, Mak Tai Song (Dayo Wong) searches for his mentor's wife, Sheh Mo Lin (Theresa Lee) and helps pay off her debt because he feels guilty for his mentor's death. On the other hand, Tong Kat (Benz Hui) pleads Mak Tai Song to mentor him, hoping to accomplish something for his father's billionaire company. Song ends up mentoring Tong Kat on a part-time basis and take shelves of good wine as payments. Song then gets chase down on making payments for She Mo Lin's debt by Lam Miu Miu (Charmaine Sheh), the debt collection agent of Sheh Mo Lin. The conflicting personalities of Lam Miu Miu, a wild spender and Mak Tai Song, a free-loader, causes many laughing moments of the drama and in the end, both fall in love with each other. When Lam Miu Miu thinks things are finally turning out the way she wants, she gets confused by Song's sudden changes and evil-tactics against Ngon Jo Lin (Michael Tse), Song's half-brother. Perhaps Song's long-lost childhood will change him entirely and make him more distant to Lam Miu Miu...

== Cast ==
=== On Family ===
Cast	Role	Description
Bowie Wu	On Sing Yin 安醒言	Ha Ching Ching's husband On Jo Lin and On Sum Bo's father Rice manufacturer Corporation Chairman
Suet Nei (雪妮)	Ha Ching Ching 夏青青	On Sing Yin's wife Mak Tai Song's mother On Jo Lin and On Sum Bo's mother
Dayo Wong	Mak Tai Song 麥提爽	Lam Miu Miu's boyfriend then fiancé ex-entrepreneur
Queenie Chu	On Sum Bo 安芯葆 (Bowie)	Mak Tai Song's little half-sister On Jo Lin's twin sister Rice manufacturer Corporation CEO
Michael Tse	On Jo Lin 安祖連 (Johnny)	Mak Tai Song's little half-brother On Sum Bo's twin brother Rice manufacturer Corporation CEO; Fuerdai; Want to become a singer

=== Ho Family ===
Cast	Role	Description
Ha Ping (夏萍)	Chow Siu Chiu 周小俏 (Betty)	Ho Man Tin's mother
Cheung Kwok Keung (張國強)	Ho Man Tin 何問天 (Martin)	Sheh Mo Lin's husband Mak Tai Song's mentor Main Villain
Theresa Lee	Sheh Mo Lin 佘慕蓮 (Melissa)	Ho Man Tin's wife

=== Lam Family ===
Cast	Role	Description
Jason Pai (白彪)	Lam Chung Chai 林忠齊	Lam Miu Miu and Lam Mok Sum's father Wonton noodle soup restaurant (Lam Chung Chai) Owner
Power Chan	Lam Mok Sum 林木森 (Sam)	Lam Miu Miu's older brother Wah Kiu's husband Rice manufacturer Corporation CEO's personal assistant
Mandy Cho	Wah Kiu 華翹	Lam Mok Sum's wife real estate sales company owner
Charmaine Sheh	Lam Miu Miu 林淼淼	Mak Tai Song's girlfriend then fiancé

=== Tong Family ===
Cast	Role	Description
Chow Chung (周驄)	Tong Pak Tak 唐伯德	Tong Kat's Father; Billionaire hotel empires owner.
Benz Hui (許紹雄)	Tong Kat 唐吉	Mak Tai Song's best friend Vivian and Gigi's ex-boyfriend Fuerdai

=== Other cast ===
Cast	Role	Description
Koni Lui (呂慧儀)	Vivian	Tong Kat's ex-girlfriend
Eric Chung (鍾志光)	Hugo	
Joel Chan (陳山聰)	Tung Yut Bun 童一本	Lam Miu Miu's ex-boyfriend admires Lam Miu Miu
JJ Jia (賈曉晨)	Gigi	Tong Kat's ex-girlfriend
Wylie Chiu (趙碩之)	Suet 雪	
Chun Wong (秦煌)	To Gor 韜哥	Food Critic
Chan Wing Kei (陳榮峻)	Bing 炳	Employee of Lam Chung Chai
Irene Wong (汪琳)	Mei 美	Step Aunt of Lam Miu Miu; Employee of Lam Chung Chai; Cashier
Oscar Leung (梁烈唯)	Choi 才	Employee of Lam Chung Chai; Waiter; Delivery Boy
Pauline Chow (周寶霖)	Mui 妹	Employee of Lam Chung Chai
Lo Mang	Lik 力	Employee of debt collector's company
Rebecca Chan	Mak Man Yin 麥文燕	Mak Man Holi’s younger sister
Kwong Chor Fai (鄺佐輝)	Mak Man Hoi 麥文海	
Law Ho Kai (羅浩楷)	Ben	
Ho Jun Hin (何俊軒)	Security	
Chloe Yuen (阮兒)		Ep.22 Cameo

== Awards and nominations ==
TVB Anniversary Awards (2009)

- Best Drama
- Best Actor (Dayo Wong)
- My Favourite Male Character (Dayo Wong)
- My Favourite Female Character (Charmaine Sheh)
- Most Improved Actress (Queenie Chu)
- Most Improved Actress (Koni Lui)

== Viewership ratings ==
	Week	Episodes	Average Points	Peaking Points	References
1	August 10–14, 2009	1 — 5	31	32	
2	August 18–21, 2009	6 — 9	29	—	
3	August 24–28, 2009	10 — 14	32	34	
4	August 31 - September 4, 2009	15 — 19	36	40	
4	September 5, 2009	20	33	38	
