= The Beauty of the Game =

Hong Kong television series

- Official poster
- 美麗高解像
- Created by: Tsui Yu On
- Written by: Lau Siu Kwan
- Directed by: Lai Pak Yin
- Starring: Kate Tsui; Christine Ng; Raymond Cho; Sharon Chan; Lai Lok-yi; Kingdom Yuen; Wong Cho-lam; Mimi Lo; Mak Cheung-ching
- Theme music composer: Tang Chi Wai
- Opening theme: "Shameless Love" (愛無愧) by Denise Ho
- Country of origin: Hong Kong
- Original language: Cantonese
- No. of episodes: 18; 20 (DVD)

Production
- Executive producer: Tsui Yu On
- Production location: Hong Kong
- Editor: Lau Chi Wah
- Camera setup: Multi camera
- Running time: 42 – 45 minutes
- Production company: TVB

Original release
- Network: TVB Jade
- Release: December 14, 2009 – January 8, 2010

The Beauty of the Game
- title card
- Traditional Chinese: 美麗高解像
- Simplified Chinese: 美丽高解像
Transcriptions
Standard Mandarin
- Hanyu Pinyin: měi lì gāo jiě xiàng
Yue: Cantonese
- Jyutping: mei5 lai6 gou1 gaai2 zoeng6

The Beauty of the Game (Traditional Chinese: 美麗高解像) is a 2009 TVB television drama from Hong Kong produced and created by Tsui Yu On. It is a contemporary drama focusing on recreational drug use and the negative issues surrounding Hong Kong's entertainment circle.

== Synopsis ==
Setting out on their quest for fame and fortune, three female TV stars of different backgrounds are determined to achieve their dreams at any price. But after so many ups and downs in their acting careers, they finally come to discover the meaning of true beauty.

When Ko Ching-Man (Kate Tsui) wins a beauty a pageant, she quickly leaps to stardom and becomes a celebrity, despite the protests of her mother, Cheung Lai-Hung (Kingdom Yuen), a retired actress. Lai-Hung knows that the life of a celebrity is not what it seems, and tries to protect her daughter from the harsh reality. Ko-Ching soon meets fellow actress Cally (Sharon Chan), and the two quickly become best friends. Cally is dating her assistant production friend Deacon (Lai Lok-yi). Ko-Ching soon finds out that Cally pretends to be rich in front of the media by borrowing money from the bank and opening multiple credit cards. Ko-Ching promises not to tell anybody. However, when the two best friends land roles in a movie, Cally wants to eliminate Ko-Ching's part so that she will be the main star. Leading actress Keung Chi-Fung (Christine Ng), once a bitter rival of Ko-Ching's mother, exposes Cally's lies and reveals the truth behind Cally's supposed wealth to the media.

Chi-Fung sees this as an opportunity to eliminate two rising stars and she begins to take Ko-Ching under her wing, slowly planning to bring her into a moral downfall. Chi-Fung pretends to be kind, but as they grow closer, Chi-Fung begins tempting Ko-Ching with drugs and money. Under Chi-Fung's influence, Lai-Hung begins to see a dramatic change in her daughter's character. Ko-Ching begins using dirty tactics to hurt Cally, such as stealing Deacon away from her. Eventually, Ko-Ching realizes Chi-Fung is just pretending to be her friend, just like Cally was.

As Ko-Ching becomes more and more scheming, she no longer trusts anyone and thinks everyone has betrayed her. Everyone is shocked by Ko-Ching's sudden change is personality, from Cally, to Chin-Fung, to her friend Kit, and even a paparazzo that has always admired Ko-Ching.

As Ko-Ching's acting career takes off, Chi-Fung becomes desperate for everlasting beauty and injects her face with botox in an attempt to slow the aging process. However, Chi-Fung's face begins changing shape and her cosmetic endorsements with many companies are cut, being replaced by Ko-Ching. Even the best actress award, that she has won for years, are slipping out of Chi-Fung's hands. To vent her anger, Chi-Fung vows to plunge Ko-Ching into a pit of despair and pain.

Ko Ching vows revenge after finding out Chi-Fung was only using her. She hurts and loses the trust of everyone around her. She takes in a rising actress named Gigi, teaching her the selfish ways that Chi-Fung taught her. Ko Ching comes home to a screaming mother, and her father surprisingly slaps her. Things go awry.

Cally has become addicted to drugs, due to Tom Tom's influence. She ransacks her parents house for drugs, and takes them all. She runs out of the house, knocking her paralyzed father out of the way. Her mom chases her and develops a heart attack and passes. From then on Cally vows to stop taking drugs and admits herself to rehabilitation.

Ko Ching calls Kit to comfort her in the park, when a mysterious man comes up to her and scratches her face with a knife. We later find out that Chi Fung hired him. She has 3 cuts, 3 millimeters thick, and it may be the end of her acting career. But Ko Ching changes herself, regretting about becoming a monster obsessed in fame and soaking in the limelight.

All is right when Ko Ching, Cally and Deacon are best friends again. Cally volunteers at the drug use facility and she and Ko Ching are in Deacon's new film. Doggie and Kit get married, and Cally and Deacon are dating.

The Best Actress Awards were Chi Fung's downfall. Chi Fung knew that Ko Ching would get the award. She attempted to kill her, leading her to the rooftop of the building. Chi Fung falls to the edge. Ko Ching couldn't save her. She was paralyzed from top to bottom, only her eyes move. Ko Ching comes to the hospital to visit her and gives her the Best Actress trophy. Turns out, Chi Fung won. And the 3 actresses learn that acting isn't in looks. It's about the feeling to give out to the viewers. And alas, the 3 actresses learn the meaning of true beauty.

== Cast ==
=== Main characters ===
- Kate Tsui as Ko Ching-man, nicknamed Ko Ching (meaning high definition), (Semi Villain) the 20-year-old daughter of restaurant owner Ko Kai-cheung and retired television actress Cheung Lai-hung. Ko Ching wishes to become a celebrity but her mother is against the idea, arguing that Ko Ching's frank and stubborn personality is unsuitable for a career in the entertainment industry. Ko Ching befriends make-up artist Kit Leung, who encourages her to join the "Perfect True Woman" beauty pageant so she can fulfill her dream of becoming a star. Ko Ching surprisingly wins the crown, opting her to sign a television artiste contract with New Star Television (NSTV).
- Christine Ng as Keung Chin-fung, (Main Villain) NSTV's award-winning television actress. Orphaned as a child, Chin-fung has no family nor friends, and only has her assistants to confide to. For many years, she has always been overshadowed by Lai-hung, then a popular television action star. Lai-hung later unexpectedly retires from the acting industry, and Chin-fung's popularity soared, becoming one of Hong Kong's most popular A-list television actresses. Through carefully planned schemes and affairs, she remains popular and influential in the television industry, receiving many acting and modeling opportunities.
- Raymond Cho Wing-Lim as Wan Sze-wai, nicknamed Wan Siu Sang, a well-known NSTV television actor. He owns a private night club called Sawasdee Club.
- Sharon Chan as Cally Tong, (Semi-Villain)NSTV's young rising actress. Cally was raised in Canada, where her father started a business. Business failed and her family was declared bankrupt. Cally returns to Hong Kong and enters the entertainment industry in order to earn enough money to raise her family. She borrows many loans and credits in order to appear rich in front of her colleagues and the media.
- Lai Lok-yi as Deacon Chong, the 24-year-old son of 'Perfection Beauty Products' CEO CT Chong and 'Sabrina' GM Lena Lam. Deacon was educated in the United States to study film and media, returning to Hong Kong soon after to be a production assistant for NSTV. Deacon initially keeps his family background a secret, wanting to achieve success through his own hard work instead of through his parents' connections.
- Kingdom Yuen as Cheung Lai-hung,(Semi Villain)a retired television actress who once worked for NSTV. Lai-hung was once a popular kung fu action star, but due to a filming accident, she injures her legs and becomes crippled, forcing her to retire from the entertainment industry. With the help of Kai-cheung, her husband, she opens up a small family restaurant and hires her past acting colleagues to be her servers.

=== Recurring characters ===
- Wong Cho Lam as Yuen Kwok-fan, nicknamed Doggie Fan, is a paparazzi reporter. Although he initially dislikes Ko Ching, who has always been sabotaging his stalking missions, he unknowingly develops a crush on her and pursues her, despite being rejected many times.
- Stephen Huynh as Tong Wai-po, nicknamed Tom Tom, NSTV's young rising actor who was born and raised overseas. He arrived in Hong Kong to try a career in modeling, which brought him to become a managed television actor under NSTV. His handsome looks causes him to be the center of attention with all sorts of rumors, including those that involve his own sexuality.
- Mimi Lo as Kit Leung, Man's good friend and make-up consultant, who also encouraged Ko Ching to join the "Perfect True Woman" beauty pageant.
- Mak Cheung-ching as To Tang, a stunt double for various actors. He was once an action choreographer, and was also once in a relationship with Chin-fung, but after Chin-fung rises to fame, she heartlessly breaks up with him.
- Yvonne Lam as Lena Lam a strong business woman. Lena is the general manager of fashion brand Sabina, also the mother of Deacon and wife of CT.
- Felix Lok as Ko Kai-cheung, the father of Ko Ching and husband of Lai-hung.
- Yu Yang as Chong Chung-tai, or CT, the father of Deacon and husband of Lena. He is the CEO of Perfect Beauty Products, who has been using Chin-fung as a regular model and spokesperson.
- Jeanette Leung as Bowie Kan, who joins the same beauty pageant as Ko Ching, also winning the same artiste contract to become a celebrity. Unfortunately for her, she does not receive the same popularity and acting opportunities as Ko Ching, and works through schemes to get herself noticed by the media.
- Ben Wong as Leung Ching-on, a respectable television director and producer.
- Kwok Fung as Chiu Kai-hung, Chin-fung's make-up artist.

== Viewership ratings ==
	Week	Episodes	Average Points	Peaking Points	References
1	December 14–18, 2009	1 — 5	26	—	
2	December 21–24, 2009	6 — 9	26	29	
3	December 28–31, 2009	10 — 13	26	29	
4	January 4–8, 2010	14 — 18	28	—	

== Trivia ==
- "Ko Ching" in Chinese means "High Definition". The main character "Ko Ching Man" is named after "HD" because the entire series was shot in High Definition. Kate Tsui mentions this during a press conference of The Beauty of the Game.
- The original idea for the show was to show the secrets of the Hong Kong Entertainment Industry.
- At the end of each episode, a 30-second advertisement is shown with the closing credits regarding the drug use in each of the episodes sponsored by the Ministry of Health and Japan White Rabbit.
