= Astro AOD =

Malaysian Cantonese-language TV channel

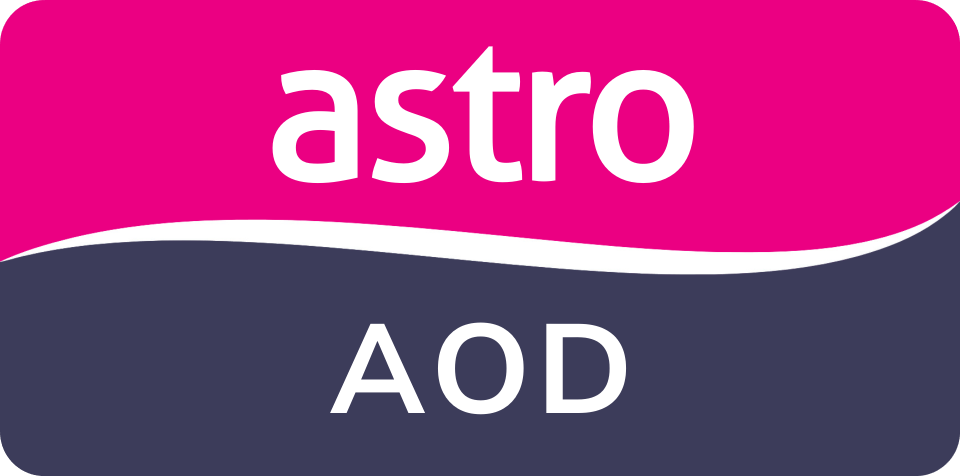
- Country: Malaysia
- Broadcast area: Malaysia
- Headquarters: Bukit Jalil, Kuala Lumpur, Malaysia

Programming
- Languages: Cantonese; Mandarin
- Picture format: 16:9 HDTV (1080i)

Ownership
- Owner: Astro (Astro Malaysia Holdings Berhad)
- Parent: TVB Limited
- Sister channels: Astro AEC; Astro Hua Hee Dai; Astro QJ

History
- Launched: 16 July 2007; 19 years ago (SD); 3 June 2013; 13 years ago (HD)
- Closed: 1 April 2020; 6 years ago (SD Feed, Channel 363); 15 March 2021; 5 years ago (SD Feed, Channel 351); 1 April 2022; 4 years ago (Channel 353 and 355); 1 April 2024; 2 years ago (Channel 352 and 354)
- Former names: Astro On Demand Drama (2007-2013); Astro On Demand (2013-2017)

Astro On Demand (simplified as Astro AOD) is a Cantonese-language drama TV channel service co-established by TVB and Astro. It features the latest TVB drama series and broadcasts the same time as the origin channel.

The channel was officially launched on 16 July 2007. Astro On Demand plays spontaneously as Hong Kong does on premiering drama series. However, not all drama series are subject to the rules above. Programming options like subtitles are available in Chinese and Malay and in recent years English subtitles and Mandarin audio option are added.

Starting in mid-2018, Astro AOD became available with additional Chinese subtitles.

== Programming schedule ==
Astro On Demand adopts NVOD so that audiences can review the dramas when they missed the first broadcasting time. For example, all the episodes of a drama premiere on 8.30 are collected at Channel 903–910; those premiere on 9.30 are collected at Channel 923–943. Each channel can collect 4 episodes at most (5–6 episodes in one channel sometimes), that is, the time audiences have to wait at the shortest is 45 minutes, the longest 3 hours (sometimes longer). Furthermore, Astro On Demand keeps the dramas for another week after the entire series ended for audiences who missed them can have a watch. However, if one drama was well received, the channel will keep it longer. So far dramas that have been kept for a month are: Moonlight Resonance, Rosy Business, Beyond the Realm of Conscience, and Born Rich.

== List Of TVB Dramas ==
=== 8.30 pm ===
Date	Drama title	Number of episodes	Channel
6 August 2007	Fathers and Sons	25	901–908
10 September	Steps	20	901–907
8 October	Men Don't Cry	21	901–907
5 November	Word Twisters' Adventures	20	901–907
3 December	The Building Blocks of Life	20	901–907
1 January 2008	Wars of In-Laws II	20	901–907
28 January	Wasabi Mon Amour	20	901–907
25 February	The Master of Tai Chi	25	901–908
31 March	A Journey Called Life	20	901–907
28 April	The Silver Chamber of Sorrows	21	901–907
26 May	The Money-Maker Recipe	21	901–908
23 June	Speech of Silence	20	901–907
21 July	When A Dog Loves A Cat	20	901–907
25 August	Your Class or Mine	20	901–907
22 September	The Four	25	901–908
26 October	When Easterly Showers Fall on the Sunny West	30	901–910
8 December	Pages of Treasures	20	901–907
5 January 2009	Sweetness in the Salt	25	901–908
9 February	The Greatness of a Hero	20	901–907
9 March	The Winter Melon Tale	20	901–907
6 April	Man in Charge	20	901–907
4 May	Just Love II	25	901–908
8 June	A Great Way To Care	20	901–907
6 July	Dressage To Win	9	901–904
13 July	A Bride for a Ride	21	901–907

=== 9.30 pm ===
Date	Drama title	Number of episodes	Channel
16 July 2007	The Drive of Life	60	931–947
8 October	The Ultimate Crime Fighter	37	931–941
26 November	Marriage of Inconvenience	20	931–937
24 December	Survivor's Law II	20	931–937
21 January 2008	The Gentle Crackdown II	20	931–937
18 February	The Seventh Day	20	931–937
18 March	ICAC Investigators 2007	5	931–933
24 March	C'est La Vie, Mon Cheri	29	931–939
21 April	Catch Me Now	20	931–937
19 May	Forensic Heroes II	30	931–940
30 June	Love Exchange	20	931–937
28 July	Moonlight Resonance	40	931–942
22 September	Last One Standing	22	931–938
20 October	The Gem of Life	82	921–943
16 February 2009	EU	30	921–930
30 March	The King of Snookers	20	921–927
27 April	Rosy Business	25	921–928
1 June	The Threshold of a Persona	30	921–930
6 July	Burning Flame III	32	921–930

=== 10.30 pm ===
Date	Drama title	Number of episodes	Channel
10 March 2008	D.I.E	25	941–947
18 August	Legend of the Demigods	22	945–950
22 December	I Do	20	945–949

=== Programming schedule table ===
Time	State	Old Channel Numbers	New Channel Numbers
8.30 pm series	Premiere	350(HD); 351(SD)	311(HD); 351(SD)
8.30 pm series	Encore	352–353	352–353
9.30 pm series	Premiere	350(HD); 361(SD)	311(HD); 351(SD)
9.30 pm series	Encore	362–363	354–355
