= Matthew Ko =

Hong Kong actor (born 1984)

Matthew Ko (183cm)
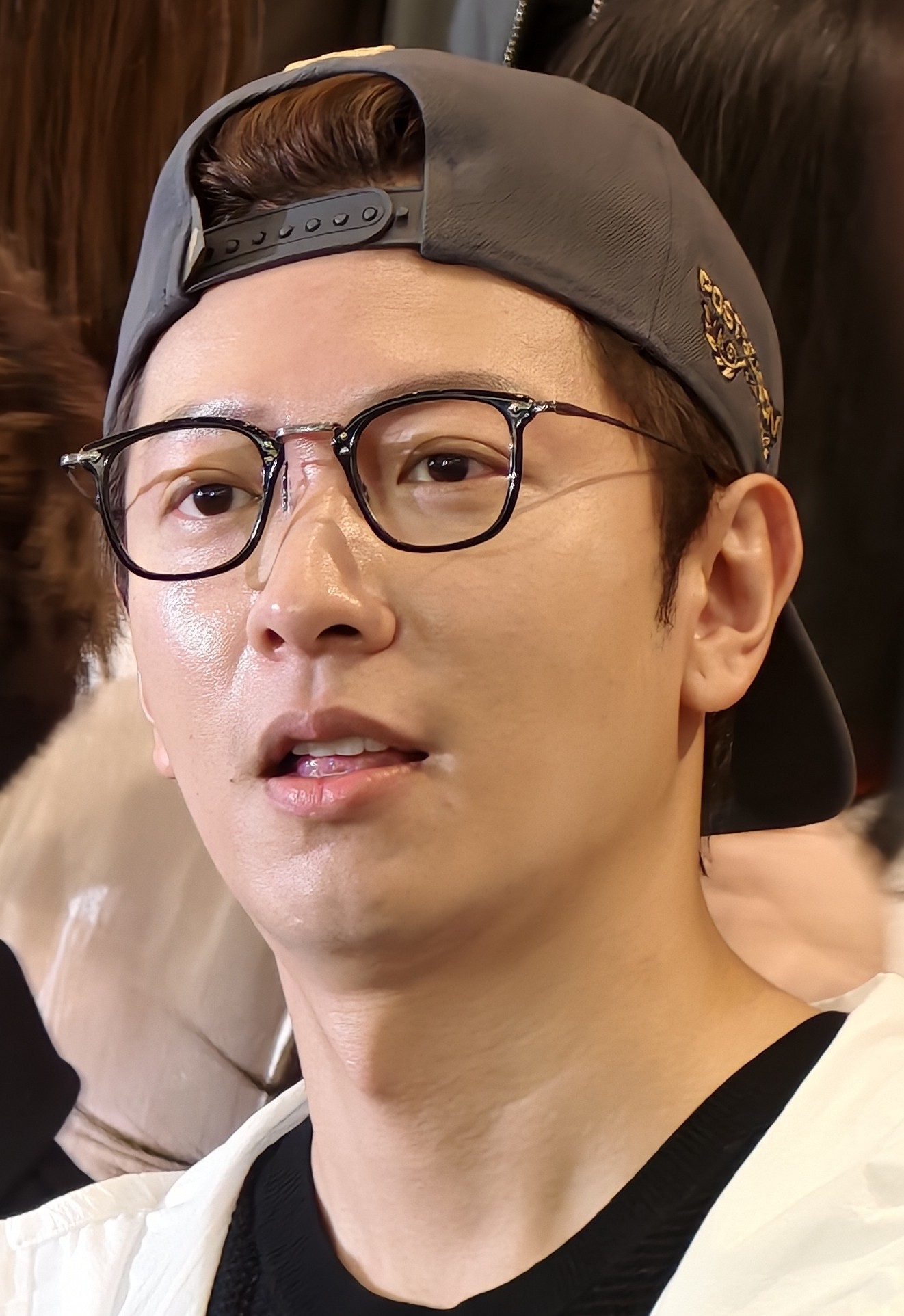
- Ko in November 2025
- Born: 20 May 1984 (age 42); Hong Kong
- Occupations: Actor, singer
- Awards: Mr. Hong Kong; 2005

Chinese name
- Traditional Chinese: 高鈞賢
- Simplified Chinese: 高钧贤
Transcriptions
Standard Mandarin
- Hanyu Pinyin: Gāo Jūnxián
Yue: Cantonese
- Jyutping: Gou1 Gwan1 Jin4

Matthew Ko Kwan-yin (born 20 May 1984) is a Hong Kong actor. In September 2014, Ko left TVB after his contract ended to later sign with Catchy Tone Artists in Mainland China.

Matthew emigrated to Toronto, Ontario, Canada with his parents at the age of seven. He attended Dr. G.W. Williams Secondary School and played on the Wildcats Basketball team. He then entered York University. In 2003, he participated in the Toronto Sunshine Boyz election and won the championship. He returned to Hong Kong in 2004 and worked as a model. In 2005, he became the first ever winner of Hong Kong's Mr. Hong Kong male beauty contest and subsequently signed a contract with TVB. Ko speaks fluent English, French, Cantonese and Mandarin.

== Filmography ==
Films
Year	Title	Role	Awards	Notes
2005	Drink-Drank-Drunk	a waiter	—	Cameo role
2009	Turning Point	police officer	—	Guest appearance
2011	I Love Hong Kong			
2011	Turning Point 2			
2012	I Love Hong Kong 2012			
2016	Buddy Cops			
TV series
Year	Title	Role	Awards	Notes
2006	To Grow with Love	Matthew Chiang Man-jun		
2007	Life Art	Jason		Episode 2
2007	On the First Beat	Lo Yan-chak		Episodes 18–20
2007	Steps	Dickson Mai	Nominated – TVB Award for Most Improved Actor	
2007	The Ultimate Crime Fighter	Lai Chi-yin	Nominated – TVB Award for Most Improved Actor	
2008	Forensic Heroes II	Wilson Mok Tseng-hong		
2008	Speech of Silence	Wilson Chung Ying-hung		
2009	Man in Charge	Shum Kwan-pok		
2009	Burning Flame III	Big B		
2010	Don Juan DeMercado	Ko Gwan-yin		
2010	Suspects in Love	Jung Yat-long		Episode 20
2010	Ghost Writer	Tsui Chung-man		Based on the short stories written by Pu Songling
2010	Beauty Knows No Pain	Ryu Kimura		
2010	Growing Through Life	Fong Lai-ha's boyfriend		
2010	Can't Buy Me Love	Prince Hung Che-gong		
2010	Every Move You Make	Kelvin Cheung Chi-kit		
2010–11	Links to Temptation	Stanley		
2011	Show Me the Happy	Dickson		Episode 39
2011	Only You	Eric		
2011	Grace Under Fire	Lee Fan		
2011	The Other Truth	Ting Chi-chung		
2011	The Life and Times of a Sentinel	Ngai Chun		
2011	Lives of Omission	Tommy Tong Wing-ho		
2011	Super Snoops	Wu Tung		
2011	Forensic Heroes III	Bowie Tsang Chi-wah		Episodes 17–20
2012	Daddy Good Deeds	Mr. Hui		Episode 1
2012	The Greatness of a Hero	Dik Kwong-yuen		Previously warehoused; aired overseas February 2009
2012	House of Harmony and Vengeance	Crown Prince		
2012	Come Home Love	Phillip		episodes 33, 36–37, 99–100
2012	Three Kingdoms RPG			
2012	King Maker			
2013	The Day of Days			
2013	Sergeant Tabloid	Officer Wong Tze-tsuen		Warehoused
2013	A Great Way to Care II			
2013	Karma Rider	Tsui Tsun-hei		
2014	Gilded Chopsticks	Yin’e		
2014	Ghost Dragon of Cold Mountain	Chu Yuk-lau		
2014	Tomorrow Is Another Day			
2014–15	Tiger Cubs II	PC Ko Chi-ho		
2015	IPCC Files 2015			Episode 3
2016	The Classic of Mountains and Seas	Sun Ju		
2022	Forensic Heroes V	Cheung Sai-hei		
2023	Night Beauties	Wong Chun-kui		
2023	The Queen of News	Shiu Chun-lok		
2025	The Queen of News 2	Shiu Chun-lok		

== Songs ==
Year	Title	TV series	Type	Album	Other notes
2006	"Legend of the Dragon King" (龍王傳說)	Legendz	Theme	EEG TVB Children Themes	
2009	"Man Behind the Scene" (幕後人)	Man in Charge	Theme		with Kenneth Ma

== Music video appearances ==
- 2006: Vangie Tsang – "Remembrance" (紀念)
- 2006: Ivana Wong – "Thunder" (雷電)
- 2006: Toby Leung – "Bastard" (賤人)
- 2006: Niki Chow – "Welcoming Heartbreak" (迎接失戀)
- 2006: Rammie Guo – "Learning to Fly" (學會飛)
- 2006: Krusty – "Shopaholic" (戀物狂)
- 2008: Denise Ho – "Synchronized Swimming" (韻律泳)
- 2009: Kate Tsui – "Mind Reading (讀心術)

== Awards ==
- 2003: The Sunshine Boyz Competition – 1st place
- 2005: Mr. Hong Kong; – 1st place
- 2005: Mr. Hong Kong – Stylish Award winner
- 2007: TVB Kids Songs Award – Top 10 Song ("Legend of the Dragon King")

Awards and achievements
Mr. Hong Kong
Preceded by N/A	Mr. Hong Kong; 2005	Succeeded by Francois Huynh
