= Leila Tong =

Hong Kong actress

Leila Kong
- Born: Kong Lai-na (江麗娜); 5 December 1981 (age 44); Hong Kong
- Occupation: Actress
- Years active: 1989–present
- Spouse: Desmond Tang (m. 2010; div. 2017)
- Children: 2

Chinese name
- Traditional Chinese: 唐寧
- Simplified Chinese: 唐宁
Transcriptions
Standard Mandarin
- Hanyu Pinyin: tang2 ning2
Yue: Cantonese
- Jyutping: tong4 ning4

Leila Kong Lai-na (Chinese: 江麗娜; born 5 December 1981) known professionally as Leila Tong / Tong Ning (Chinese: 唐寧) is a Hong Kong actress. She was born into an Indonesian Cantonese family. Her birth name is used in her works during her childhood and adolescence.

== Career ==
At the age of 8, Kong made her first film appearance in director John Woo's action-comedy Once A Thief, which was nominated for several categories at the 11th Annual Hong Kong Film Awards. TVB then recruited Kong as a child star, and she has since then appeared in dramas such as The Greed of Man and State of Divinity.

As an adult, she took a three-year break from the entertainment circle to attend a designing college. Kong has declined TVB's offer to personally manage her.

Before 2004, her popular works include the popular Aqua Heroes and Square Pegs, which also starred Roger Kwok and Jessica Hsuen.

In 2004, she was invited to film CCTV's Liao Zhai along with a host of mainland China's rising stars. The show was extremely popular and spun Liao Zhai II. She also filmed Twin of Brothers, alongside Raymond Lam, Ron Ng, Tavia Yeung and Li Qian of CCTV. Later that year, she starred in The Last Breakthrough, starring Nick Cheung, Raymond Lam and Sonija Kwok. Although The Last Breakthrough did not receive good ratings in HK, it is still remembered and favoured by many as one of the most meaningful and touching series TVB ever made.

The modern sequel to Square Pegs, Life Made Simple was filmed with the same cast and released in 2005. At the end of its run, the series became one of the highest rated of 2005, with Wars of in Laws, which also starred Bosco Wong.

Kong has been nominated for TVB's "Most Improved Actress" award consecutively. In 2004, she entered through Aqua Heroes and Square Pegs. Later in 2005, she made it to the top 10 list with both her character as Angel in Life Made Simple and as Ha Hiu Ching in The Last Breakthrough. Bar Benders was Kong's only series broadcast in 2006 but turned up on TVB's list of top five series of that year.

In 2007, two of her series — Ten Brothers and Family Link — have also made it into TVB's five top-rated dramas of 2007. Kong also came out of War and Destiny, which was received with praise and critical acclaim for her performance. She was invited by CCTV to film The Last Princess with Sammul Chan. The show was received very well in mainland China. In December, she released her first Mandarin music album named Singing with the Moon in Beijing.

The following year, in 2008, she filmed The Greatness of a Hero in TVB, starring as Shangguan Wan'er, a well-known historic figure. The drama also starred Sunny Chan, Kent Cheng, Bernice Liu and Sonija Kwok. She once again collaborated with Kenneth Ma in a new ancient drama, Man in Charge, alongside Kate Tsui. On the second time, she filmed L For Love♥ L For Lies with Stephy Tang and Alex Fong.

== Personal life ==
Kong married Desmond Tang in 2010. The couple met during a collaboration of the stage play, Popcorn Killer (爆谷殺人狂), and dated for three years. Kong uploaded a photo of herself and Tang on Weibo on 10 September 2010 to announce their engagement, with the comment "To all my good friends, thank you all for being by my side to witness my growth. I want to tell everyone now that I am preparing to step into another phase in my life! I am announcing to everyone, I am getting married!" The couple announced that they would not hold a wedding banquet, but would celebrate with a meal with family on both sides. In March 2011, she gave birth to a baby boy, Chun Chun. In January 2015, Kong announced the birth of her second child, a baby girl delivered via caesarean section. However, in 2017, they divorced.

Kong is an advocate for animal welfare and environmental conservation. In order to properly reflect her position, she converted to a vegetarian diet in 2013.

== Filmography ==
=== Television ===
| Year | Title | Role | Network | Notes |
|---|---|---|---|---|
| 1990 | Return to the Truth | Man Man | | |
| 1992 | The Greed of Man | Fong Fong | TVB Jade | |
| 1993 | Racing Peak | Chung Oi Ling | TVB Jade | |
| 1994 | Instinct | | TVB Jade | |
| 1995 | When a Man Loves a Woman | Apple | TVB Jade | |
| 1996 | State of Divinity | Kuk Fei Yin | TVB Jade | |
| 2002 | Legal Entanglement | Sales in the Candy Shop | TVB Jade | |
| 2002 | A Case of Misadventure | Siu Tuo | TVB Jade | |
| 2002 | Let's Face It | Ko Ka Lei | TVB Jade | |
| 2002 | Burning Flame II | Chan Siu Lan | TVB Jade | |
| 2002 | Golden Faith | | TVB Jade | episode 18 |
| 2002 | Take My Word For It | Yip Ho Oi | TVB Jade | |
| 2002 | Square Pegs | Ling Choi Deep | TVB Jade | |
| 2003 | Find the Light | Siu Sun Ji | TVB Jade | |
| 2003 | Aqua Heroes | Yau Wing | TVB Jade | |
| 2003 | Vigilante Force | Luk Lai Kun | TVB Jade | |
| 2003 | In the Realm of Fancy | Zi Ye | TVB Jade | |
| 2004 | Twin of Brothers | Si Fei Huen | TVB Jade | |
| 2004 | The Last Breakthrough | Ha Hiu Ching | TVB Jade | Nominated – Most Improved Female Artiste (Top 5) |
| 2004 | The ICAC Investigations 2004 | Mary | TVB Jade | |
| 2005 | Liao Zhai | Xiao Xie | | |
| 2005 | Life Made Simple | On Kei | TVB Jade | |
| 2006 | Bar Bender | Tseung Si Ting | TVB Jade | Nominated – Most Improved Female Artiste (Top 5) |
| 2006 | Good Against Evil | Lau Fei Fung | | |
| 2007 | The Family Link | Sue Siu Man | TVB Jade | Nominated – Best Supporting Actress (Top 5); Nominated – My Favourite Female Character (Top 24); Nominated – Most Improved Female Artiste (Top 10) |
| 2007 | Ten Brothers | Hung Siu Lan | TVB Jade | Nominated – Most Improved Female Artiste (Top 10) |
| 2007 | The Legend of Love | Po Hei Yi | TVB Jade | |
| 2007 | War and Destiny | Cheng Yuet Fung | TVB Jade | Nominated – Most Improved Female Artiste (Top 10) |
| 2007 | Phoenix Rising | So Fei/Yeung Choi-Lam | TVB Jade | (warehoused) |
| 2007 | The Last Princess | Li Kai Xin (Lee Hoi Sum) | | |
| 2009 | Man in Charge | Chong Siu Han | TVB Jade | |
| 2009 | Room for Rent | Doris | RTHK | |
| 2010 | A Pillow Case of Mystery II | Luk Siu Dip/Ting Mei Yan | TVB Jade | |
| 2010 | Rooms to Let 2010 | Doris | RTHK | |
| 2011 | Love and Again | Lau Fuo Mei | TVB Jade | |
| 2011 | ICAC Investigators 2011 | Man Ka-kei | RTHK | |
| 2012 | The Greatness of a Hero | Shangguan Wan'er | TVB Jade | (warehoused) |
| 2014 | The Borderline | Ding Siu-hoi | HKTV | |
| 2015 | Sexpedia | herself | HKTV | episode 8 |
| 2015 | Karma | Michelle Fong | HKTV | |
| 2015 | Beyond the Rainbow | Kwok ching-man / Kelly Yeung | HKTV | |

=== Films ===
The following is the filmography (films) for Leila Tong.

| Year | Title | Role | Notes |
|---|---|---|---|
| 1991 | Once a Thief 縱橫四海 | young Red Bean | |
| 1993 | City Hunter 城市獵人 | Kaori (child) | |
| 1993 | The Bride with White Hair 白髮魔女傳 | young Zhuo Yihang | |
| 1995 | The Meaning of Life | | |
| 1996 | Those Were the Days; 4個32A和一個香蕉少年 | young Minnie Liu | |
| 1997 | Lawyer Lawyer | Gat's maid | |
| 1999 | Beach Girl | | |
| 1999 | The Boss Up There 生命楂Fit人 | Kitty (Fong's deceased girl friend) | |
| 2000 | An Eye for an Eye | Fan Yuk Shan | |
| 2000 | 990714.com | Nun | |
| 2001 | Chinese Heroes | Sakura | |
| 2001 | Ultimate Intelligence | Alice | |
| 2002 | Love is a Butterfly | Prince Wah'sgirlfriend | |
| 2002 | The Untold Story- Suddenly Vanished | Helen Chan | |
| 2003 | Tragic Room | Lok Yau Nam | |
| 2003 | The Trouble-Makers | | |
| 2004 | Cop Unbowed 誓不低頭 | Siu Dip (Butterfly) | |
| 2005 | Summer Breeze | | |
| 2006 | Marriage With a Fool 獨家試愛 | Sai-Mun | |
| 2007 | House of the Invisibles | Gigi | |
| 2007 | Dead Air 鬼计 | Tincy/Fu Wing Sze | |
| 2008 | L for Love L for Lies 我的最愛 | Man | |
| 2009 | A Very Short Life 短暫的生命 | Becky Lee | |
| 2011 | Big Blue Lake | Cheung Lai-yee | |
| 2015 | Anniversary | | |
| 2016 | Cold War 2 | | |
| 2017 | Our Time Will Come | | |

=== Television shows ===
| Year | Title | Network | Role | Notes/Ref. |
|---|---|---|---|---|
| 2018 | Stolen Homelands | ViuTV | Host | EP1-8 |

== Discography ==
| Year | Album information | Tracklist |
|---|---|---|
| 2007 | Singing with the Moon 《邀月唱》 Released: December 2007 | 1.邀月唱; 2.1234567; 3.愛情物語; 4.愛若是個圓; 5.不走尋常路; 6.那麼重要; 7.傷心代碼; 8.遠方的人; 9.說聲Goodbye |
