= François Wong =

François Huỳnh
- Born: 28 March 1985 (age 41); Hong Kong
- Occupation: Actor
- Musical career
- Also known as: Wong Cheung-fat

François Huỳnh (Chinese: 黃長發; born 28 March 1985) is a Hong Kong male television actor currently with Hong Kong's television station TVB.

== Background ==
Huỳnh was born in Hong Kong, however he was raised in France and returned to Hong Kong after finishing his studies. His parents are ethnic Teochew Chinese from Vietnam. He is fluent in French, Cantonese, English, Mandarin and Spanish.

Wong previously won the title of Mr. Hong Kong in 2006. His brother Stefan Wong was also a contestant for Mr. Hong Kong.

He was once involved in an affair with Karen Lee, mistress of Hong Kong billionaire Patrick 'Shoe King' Tang, attracting significant negative attention. This led to his departure from TVB.

== Filmography ==
- Best Selling Secrets (2007)
- Fathers and Sons (2007)
- On the First Beat (2007) (Guest role)
- D.I.E. (2008)
- A Journey Called Life (2008)
- Speech of Silence (2008)
- Pages of Treasures (2008) (Episode 12)
- The King of Snooker (2009)
- A Watchdog's Tale (2009)

Awards and achievements
Mr. Hong Kong
Preceded by Matthew Ko	Mr. Hong Kong; 2006	Succeeded by Benjamin Yuen
