= Karl Ting =

Hong Kong actor and television presenter

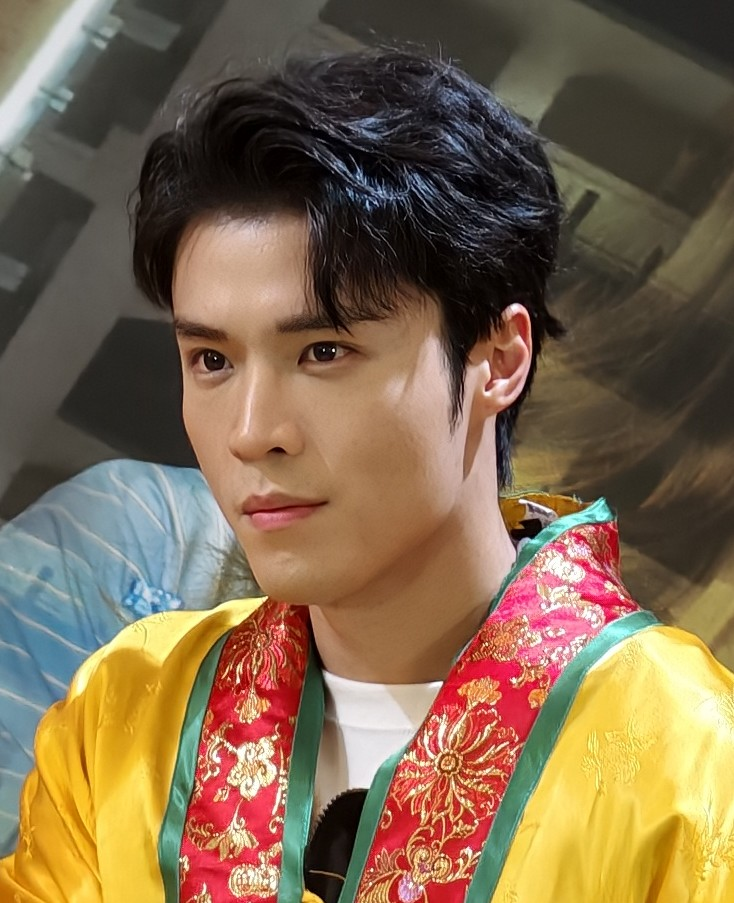
- Ting in 2026
- Born: Ting Tse Long; British Hong Kong
- Occupations: Actor; Television presenter; YouTuber
- Years active: 2016–
- Awards: Mr. Hong Kong 2016; First Runner-up, Mr. Photogenic, Most Liked by Audience

Chinese name
- Traditional Chinese: 丁子朗
Transcriptions
Yue: Cantonese
- Jyutping: ding1 zi2 long5
- Musical career
- Also known as: 膠丁

Karl Ting Tze Long is a Hong Kong actor and television presenter. Ting joined TVB after winning first-runner up, Mr. Photogenic, and Most Liked by Audience awards at the Mr. Hong Kong 2016 contest. He was the first Mr. Photogenic, and the youngest contestant to win the most awards in the contest's history.

== Early life ==
Karl Ting studied at Pui Kiu College before immigrating to Toronto, Canada at the age of 14. Ting speaks four languages: Cantonese, English, Mandarin, and Korean. He learned Choy Li Fut from grade 1 to grade 9 and hence performed it as his talent at both competitions. He enjoys filming short clips and uploading them to YouTube. His personal channel is named, "Karl Ting 丁子朗."

== Project Boyz Power Toronto ==
Under the encouragement of his relatives, Ting entered the inaugural Project Boyz Power Toronto (PBPT), a preliminary organized by Fairchild TV that sends overseas contestants to the Mr. Hong Kong contest. TVB executives Virginia Lok and Sandy Yu attended the event to seek eligible candidates for TVB. Ting did not win any awards at the contest, with Freeyon Chung being the winner and Christian Yeung winning first runner-up.

== Mr. Hong Kong 2016 ==
After PBPT, all eligible candidates received a casting opportunity for Mr. Hong Kong. As the winner, Chung received a complimentary air ticket, while Yeung and Ting traveled to Hong Kong at their own expense. All three entered the Mr. Hong Kong 2016 contest (which was on a five-year hiatus previously) and successfully made the top 14 after two rounds of interview. Consequently, they all made the top 10 and gained the opportunity to travel to Taiwan for filming and shooting.

For the first time, the Mr. Hong Kong and Miss Hong Kong pageants were held together; with the winners being announced onstage. Initially criticized for his body, Ting bested a number of favorites and ended up winning the most awards in the contest - First-Runner Up, Mr. Photogenic, and a side award - Most Liked by Audience.

== Venture into TVB ==
After the contest, he joined TVB and became the first Mr. Hong Kong to host a TVB Anniversary. Subsequently, Ting and most of the 2016 Miss and Mr. Hong Kong contestants enrolled in a three month long acting course. Dubbed as the 29th annual TVB Acting course and the first annual TVB Advance Acting Course, he graduated in March 2017. Since then, he has received numerous hosting opportunities, most of them being variety shows. In July 2017, he was cast for a role in the new drama, 再創世紀, a sequel of At the Threshold of an Era. He was selected alongside Chris Lai, Mat Yeung, and Matthew Ho as the promo ambassadors for the Miss Hong Kong 2017 Pageant. Ting plans to finish his college education in the future.

== Filmography ==
=== Television dramas ===
Year	Month and Day	Title	Role	Notes
Television Broadcast Limited
2017	TBD	抱佣情人	ICAC Investigator	Episode 8; cameo and first appearance in a drama
2017		再創世紀	TBA	
2019		The Man who kills Trouble	高喜俊	
2020		堅離地對堅離地	TBA	

=== Television presenter ===
Year	Month and Day	Title	Notes
Television Broadcast Limited
2016	November 19	TVB Anniversary	Co-hosted with Liza Wang, Carol Cheng, Natalis Chan, Wong Cho Lam, Janis Chan, Luk Ho Ming, and Grace Chan. Guest performance with past and current Mr. Hong Kong contestants
2017	January 14	Yan Chai Charity Show	Annual charity show to raise funds for Yan Chai Hospital. Co-hosted with Liza Wang, Patrick Dunn, Carlo Ng, Meini Cheung, and Bowie Cheung
2017	January 28	CNY Daytime Special	Annual daytime Chinese New Year program. Co-hosted alongside Liza Wang, Patrick Dunn, Carlo Ng, Amigo Chui, Janis Chan, Ashley Chu, Crystal Fung
2017	January 28	CNY Night Parade	Annual Chinese New Year Parade hosted by the Hong Kong Tourism Board. Co-hosted alongside Heidi Chu, Luk Ho Ming, and Gloria Tang
2017	March 18	Pok Oi Charity Show	Annual charity show to raise funds for Pok Oi Hospital. Co-hosted with Carol Cheng and Grace Chan
2017	March 27 to April 14	Easy Come Easy Health	Co-hosted alongside Wayne Lai, Chris Lai, and Bonnie Chan. Filming started in various parts of Taiwan (February 11 to 16), Japan (February 24 to March 6), and Hong Kong (up until March 30)
2017	May 20	Children's Cantonese Opera Competition	兒童青少年粵劇折子戲大賽; co-host with Liza Wang. Prerecorded on May 3.
2017	June 10	Hong Kong Round The Clock	Episode 13; co-host with Andrew Yuen Man-kit and Gilbert Lam. Filmed from May 28 to June 2.
2017	June 17	Caritas Star Studded Charity Show	Annual charity show to raise funds for Caritas Hong Kong. Co-host alongside Patrick Dunn, Astrid Chan, and Bowie Cheung
2017	July 1	Fireworks Display For Celebration of the 20th Anniversary	Fireworks display for the 20th Anniversary of The Handover. Co-hosted along with Heidi Chu.
2017	July 16	2017 WDSF Grandslam	Cohost with Crystal Fung
Fairchild TV
2016	July 3	What's On	

=== Variety shows ===
Year	Month and Day	Title	Notes
Television Broadcast Limited
2016	July 17	MyTV Super All Star Summer	Guest appearance
2016	September 4	MissHK Meet MrHK 2016	Pre-show to the Mr. Hong Kong 2016 contest
2016	September 9	The Green Room	Talk show appearance with four other Mr. Hong Kong contestants
2016	September 10	Mr. Hong Kong 2016 Contest	Received the Mr. Photogenic Award and placed in the top 4
2016	September 11	Mr. Hong Kong 2016 Pageant	Declared as the first-runner up
2016	October 15	Gala Spectacular	Guest appearance. Annual charity show held to raise funds for Po Leung Kuk
2016	October 17	Anniversary Light 2016	Guest performer for opening
2016	December 3	Tung Wah Charity Show	Guest performance with Jacqueline Wong and Mr. Hong Kong 2016 contestants
2017	February 12	Own Sweet Home	Guest appearance on episode 320
2017	April 19	Pleasure & Leisure	Filmed on March 31
2017	June 18	Big Big Kids Awards 2017	Filmed on June 11
2017	June 24	Construction Industry Council Programme	阿朗; Filmed on June 5 and 6
2017	July 13	Pleasure & Leisure	安齡暑假冇時停; filmed on June 23
2017	July 15	Dinner Mas	Episode 20; Filmed from July 3 to July 6
2017	July 23	The Big Big Channel Nite	Guest
2017	September 2	Miss Hong Kong 2017 Pageant	Guest performer
2017	October 3	Big Big Channel Mid Autumn Hasty Party	Guest
2023	November 25	Asia Super Young	Contestant
Fairchild TV
2016	June 11	Project Boyz Power Toronto	Held at John Bassett Theatre

=== Micro movie ===
Year	Month and Day	Title	Character	Notes
Television Broadcast Limited
2017	February 14	Finding My Hero	藍文浩	Premiered on the TVB ENews app. Released 3 days later on HK's J2 Channel.

== Awards ==
Year	Contest	Awards
2016	Mr. Hong Kong Contest	First-Runner Up
2016	Mr. Hong Kong Contest	Mr. Photogenic
2016	Mr. Hong Kong Contest	Most Liked By Audience
