= Mister Hong Kong =

National male beauty pageant

Mr. Hong Kong
- Formation: 2005
- Type: Beauty Pageant
- Headquarters: Hong Kong
- Location: China
- Members: Mister World
- Official language: Chinese, English

The Mr. Hong Kong Contest, (Chinese: 香港先生選舉) abbreviated as Mr. HK (港生), is a beauty contest for young men organized by the leading Hong Kong television station, TVB. The contest began in 2005, was suspended from 2012 to 2015 and in 2017, and then resumed. Winners have the opportunity to represent Hong Kong in the Mister World contest.

== History ==
Like the Miss Hong Kong Pageant, top Mr. Hong Kong contestants are awarded to a contract with TVB, and many of them become promoted television actors. A contestant and runner-up in 2005, Byron Pang, even went on to become a film star. In his first film role, in the 2009 Hong Kong movie Amphetamine, his pubic hair, penis and testicles were fully exposed on camera, in several scenes.

The contest also has other consolation prizes that vary slightly from year to year. Unlike their female counterpart, Mr. Hong Kong does not have specific first and second runner-up positions. Contestants are divided into two groups, the Stylish Youth Division (瀟灑少年) and the Maturity Division (健力盛年), and a winner is chosen from both groups. The final winner (the Mr. Hong Kong) will then be determined by the top contestants of both groups. But from 2016, first and second runner-up positions added as first time, also the minimum participant age limit has lowered to 16.

Judges for the contest are all women, and winners of the contest are also determined by a public vote of 600 to 800 female viewers. The first ever winner of the contest was Matthew Ko.

The modern Mr. Hong Kong Contest is completely unrelated to the original Mr. Hong Kong bodybuilding contest from the 1970s.

== Titleholders ==
Year	Mr. Hong Kong 香港先生	Stylish winner 瀟灑組別冠軍	Maturity winner 健力組別冠軍
2005	Matthew Ko	Matthew Ko	Rocky Cheng (鄭健樂)
2006	Francois Huynh	Francois Huynh	Otto Chan

Year	Mr. Hong Kong 香港先生	Youth winner 少年組別冠軍	Maturity winner 盛年組別冠軍
2007	Benjamin Yuen	Michael Chiu (趙國東)	Zhiwei Hu
2008	Michael Wilson Tsu (朱允崇)	Joey Law (羅天宇)	Michael Wilson Tsu
2009	Jack Hui (許家傑)	Calvin Chan (陳偉洪)	Jack Hui
2010	William Chak		
2011	Clayton Li (李晉強)		

Year	Winner 冠軍	First runner-up 亞軍	Second runner-up 季軍
2016	Jackson Lai (黎振燁)	Karl Ting	Freeyon Chung (鍾君揚)

== Notable winners and contestants ==
- Matthew Ko (Mr. Hong Kong 2005; actor)
- Rocky Cheng (鄭健樂, Mr. Hong Kong 2005 runner-up; actor)
- Stefan Wong (Maturity division runner-up 2005; actor)
- Francois Huynh (Mr. Hong Kong 2006; actor)
- Benjamin Yuen (Mr. Hong Kong 2007; actor)

=== Hosts ===
Year	Host
2005	Carol Cheng, Niki Chow & Anna Yau
2006	Carol Cheng, Kathy Chow & Anna Yau
2007	Carol Cheng, Maggie Cheung Ho-yee & Anna Yau
2008	Carol Cheng, Miriam Yeung & Anna Yau
2009	Carol Cheng, Miriam Yeung & Janis Chan
2010	Carol Cheng, Christine Ng, Koni Lui, Ella Koon &Mandy Lieu
2011	Carol Cheng, Sharon Chan, Koni Lui, Jacquelin Chong & Hanjin Tan
2015	Carol Cheng, Luk Wing Kuen & C Kwan
2016	Carol Cheng, Luk Wing Kuen & C Kwan

=== Mister World ===
Color key

- Declared as Winner
- Ended as runner-up
- Ended as one of the finalists or semifinalists
- Special Award

Year	Mr. Hong Kong	Placement	Special Awards
Did not compete between 2012 - present
2010	Wesley Lee Chun Ming		Top Model (Top 20); Talent (Top 20)
2007	François Huynh		
2000	Lam Ming-lok		

== Controversy ==
Hong Kong Broadcasting Authority has received a number of complaints from the public regarding the Mr. Hong Kong Contest, in which the programme was said to be of bad taste and that the male contestants were treated as sex objects by the women in the show. These complaints were later dismissed.

== See also ==
- List of beauty pageants
- Miss Hong Kong
