= To Grow with Love =

- 肥田囍事
- Genre: Modern Drama
- Starring: Myolie Wu; Andy Hui; Eddie Kwan; Kenneth Ma; Selena Li; Claire Yiu; Jack Wu
- Opening theme: Ugly till Pretty (醜得漂亮) by Andy Hui & Myolie Wu
- Ending theme: Ms Piggy (豬小姐) by Myolie Wu; Mr Piggy (豬先生) by Andy Hui
- Country of origin: Hong Kong
- Original language: Cantonese
- No. of episodes: 21

Production
- Running time: 45 minutes (approx.)

Original release
- Network: TVB
- Release: October 23 – November 18, 2006

To Grow With Love (Traditional Chinese: 肥田囍事) is a TVB modern drama series broadcast in October 2006. The series is shown to celebrate TVB's 39th Anniversary.

Myolie Wu gained a reported 50 pounds to play her role of Tina Ho Mei-Tin and Jack Wu gained 40 pounds to play his role of Lam Koon-Hei.

== Synopsis ==
Tina Ho Me-Tin (Myolie Wu) is an overweight woman who is determined to find her soulmate. Tina wants to find someone who thinks the same way she does and whom she can communicate with. She placed yellow hand prints under a painting of the sun setting, if that ONE man knew those handprints were a Sunflower; he's her soulmate. She flees to Hong Kong to get away from her frustrating father. There, she meets up with her cousin, Maggie Kwok Bo-Lok (Selena Li).

Tina meets a fashion designer named Daniel Dai Hei (Andy Hui). She works for his company D-Day but her designs are horrible. At first Daniel hates Tina, but he learns to accept her a little bit after seeing how much she has to struggle in Hong Kong. She has helped him quite a bit also, emotionally.

Upon the decision of firing her due to her lack of designing skills, Daniel begins treating her much nicer. However, Tina uses him to trick her father. On a misunderstanding everyone thought Tina had lost her virginity to her boss, her father traveled all the way to Hong Kong. With the help of her land lady (Gigi Wong), they devise a meeting between Tina's father and Daniel. With verbal interruptions, they prevented either of them from discovering the truth, temporarily.

Tina's father, however, sees Daniel with his actual girlfriend - whom he introduced - and decides to take action against her daughters 'two-timing boyfriend'. One thing leads to the next and Daniel, comprehending what had happened, becomes very angry. Daniel's girlfriend, Rachel Sung Ma-Yee (Claire Yiu), finds out what happened and takes it the wrong way. However, Daniel fires Tina and insults her harshly, then tells Rachel that he has nothing to do with her. Tina is very upset and goes back home in the Philippines.

When Rachel goes to Philippines for a business trip, Daniel wants to give her a surprise and goes to visit her. He goes to a jewelry shop to buy a Rachel a present where he meets Tina's fiancé, Mak Ka-Fai (Kenneth Ma). While talking, they both get hit by a car. Tina's fiancé falls into a coma, while Daniel loses his memory. Tina decides to use this to her advantage and get revenge on Daniel for all the awful things he has done to her. First, she decides to fatten him up (because she knows how much he hates fat people), and then makes him fall in love with her. She plans to break up with him and break his heart. However, Tina found herself falling for him too!

== Cast ==
Cast	Role	Description
Myolie Wu	Ho Mei-Tin (Tina) 何美田	Fashion Designer; Dai Hei's Girlfriend; Wedding Planner; Kwok Bo-Lok's cousin.
Andy Hui	Dai Hei (Daniel) 戴喜	D Day Fashion Designer; Sung Man-Yee's lover. Ho Mei-Tin boyfriend
Eddie Kwan (關禮傑)	Chiang Yat-Ming (Terry) 蔣一鳴	D-Day Partner; Chaing Man-Jun's older brother.
Selena Li	Kwok Bo-Lok (Maggie) 郭寶樂	Ho Mei-Tin's cousin. Lam Koon-Hei's lover and then wife Admires Chiang Man-Jun
Claire Yiu	Sung Man-Yee (Rachel) 宋曼頤	Dai Hei's assistant and lover. Model
Kenneth Ma	Mak Ka-Fai 麥家輝	Ho Mei-Tin's fiancé.
Gigi Wong	Yeung Sau-Lan/Lui Sau-Lan 楊秀蘭/呂秀蘭	Kwok Bo-Lok's land lady.
Jack Wu	Lam Koon-Hei 林冠希	Ho Mei-Tin's friend. Kwok Bo-Lok's lover.
Matthew Ko	Chiang Man-Jun (Matthew) 蔣文俊	Chiang Yat-Ming 's younger brother. Likes Ho Mei-Tin
Chun Wong (秦煌)	Ho Nim-Heung 何念鄉	Ho Mei-Tin's father.
Chiang Chi Kwong (蔣志光)	Dai Fu (Albert) 戴富	Dai Hei's older brother. Lau Ka-Man's husband.
Natalie Wong	Lau Ka-Man (Carmen) 劉嘉敏	Dai Fu's wife.

== Viewership ratings ==
	Week	Episode	Average Points	Peaking Points	References
1	October 23–27, 2006	1 — 5	32	34	
2	October 30 - November 3, 2006	6 — 10	32	33	
3	November 6–9, 2006	11 — 14	32	35	
4	November 13–17, 2006	15 — 19	32	34	
4	November 18, 2006	20 — 21	30	33	

== Accolades ==
Year	Ceremony	Category	Recipients and nominees	Result
2006	TVB Anniversary Awards	Best Drama		Nominated
2006	TVB Anniversary Awards	Best Actor	Andy Hui	Nominated
2006	TVB Anniversary Awards	Most Popular Male Character	Andy Hui	Nominated
2006	TVB Anniversary Awards	Best Actress	Myolie Wu	Nominated
2006	TVB Anniversary Awards	Most Popular Female Character	Myolie Wu	Nominated
2006	TVB Anniversary Awards	Most Popular Female Character	Gigi Wong	Nominated
2006	TVB Anniversary Awards	Best Supporting Actor	Jack Wu	Nominated
2006	TVB Anniversary Awards	Best Supporting Actress	Gigi Wong	Nominated
2006	TVB Anniversary Awards	Best Supporting Actress	Selena Li	Nominated
