= The Greatness of a Hero =

Hong Kong television series

- Promo poster
- 盛世仁傑
- Genre: Historical drama
- Written by: Ka Wai-nam
- Starring: Kent Cheng; Sunny Chan; Sonija Kwok; Bernice Liu; Wayne Lai; Lee Heung-kam; Rebecca Chan; Leila Tong; Raymond Cho; Stephen Wong; Claire Yiu; Matthew Ko; Queenie Chu
- Theme music composer: Wong Seung-wai
- Opening theme: Ding Guk (定局) performed by Hins Cheung
- Country of origin: Hong Kong
- Original language: Cantonese
- No. of episodes: 20

Production
- Producer: Leung Choi-yuen
- Camera setup: Multi camera
- Running time: 45 minutes (each)
- Production company: TVB

Original release
- Network: Jade; HD Jade
- Release: 2 April – 27 April 2012

The Greatness of a Hero
- intertitle
- Traditional Chinese: 盛世仁傑
- Simplified Chinese: 盛世仁杰
- Literal meaning: "Renjie's Prosperous Era" or "Merciful Hero's Prosperous Era"
Transcriptions
Yue: Cantonese
- Jyutping: Sing4 Sai3 Jan4 Git6

The Greatness of a Hero is a Hong Kong television historical drama serial produced by TVB under executive producer Leung Choi-yuen. It first aired on Malaysia's Astro On Demand from 9 February to 6 March 2009 and on several TVB overseas cable channels in 2010. The Greatness of a Hero started its broadcast on Hong Kong's Jade and HD Jade channels on 2 April 2012.

== Synopsis ==
Dik Yan-kit was a legendary chancellor in China's history. He served as chancellor during the Tang dynasty and Zhou dynasty and was greatly trusted by Mo Chak-tin. The Empress's nephew, Mo Sing-chi, was jealous and sought every opportunity to frame him. He accused Dik of colluding with his son-in-law Sung Ting-yuk in order to usurp the Empress's throne. Dik's family was seized but in the confusion, Dik escaped. Mo Sing-chi then threatened to kill Dik's wife, Cho Yuet. Will Dik Yan-kit be able to win against his enemies?

== Cast ==
Note: Some of the characters' names are in Cantonese romanisation.

=== The Dik family ===
Cast	Role	Description	Age
Lee Heung Kam	Old Mrs Dik 狄太夫人	Dik Yan-Kit's mother Cho Yuet's mother-in-law Dik Ching-luen, Dik Kwong-yuen and Dik King-fai's grandmother	70
Kent Cheng	Dik Yan-kit 狄仁傑	On Lau-mui's son Cho Yuet's husband Dik Ching-luen, Dik Kwong-yuen and Dik King-fai's father Mo Sing-chi's enemy Sung Ting-yuk's superior Degraded to Luozhou County official in Episode 2 Promoted to chancellor in Episode 20	50
Sonija Kwok	Cho Yuet 曹月	Royal jewelry designer On Lau-mui's daughter-in-law Dik Yan-kit's second wife Dik Ching-luen, Dik Kwong-yuen's stepmother Dik King-fai's mother Killed by Mo Sing-chi in Episode 19	30
Bernice Liu	Dik Ching-luen 狄青鸞	On Lau-mui's granddaughter Dik Yan-kit's eldest daughter Cho Yuet's stepdaughter Dik Kwong-yuen's sister Dik King-fai's half-sister Sung Ting-yuk's fiancée Promoted to Royal constable in Episode 20	20
Matthew Ko	Dik Kwong-yuen 狄光遠	On Lau-mui's grandson Dik Yan-kit's second son Cho Yuet's stepson Dik Ching-luen's brother Dik King-fai's half-brother	20
Lawrence Ng	Dik King-fai 狄景輝	On Lau-mui's grandson Dik Yan-kit and Cho Yuet's third son Dik Ching-luen and Dik Kwong-yuen's half-brother	

=== The Mo family ===
Cast	Role	Description	Age
Wayne Lai	Mo Sing-chi 武承嗣	Prince of Ngai; Mo Chak-tin's nephew Lee Hin and Mo Sam-si's cousin Ngan Sui-wan's husband Mo Yin-ming and Mo Yin-tak's father Dik Yat-kit's enemy Framed Lee Hin and Dik Yan-kit; Killed Cheung So-ngor, Sung Ting-yuk, Chau Kuk, Cho Yuet; Executed by poison by Mo Chak-tin in Episode 20 (Main villain)	40
Rosanne Lui	Ngan Sui-wan 顏瑞雲	Mo Sing-chi's wife Mo Yin-ming and Mo Yin-tak's mother Framed Lee Hin and Dik Yan-kit; Killed by Mo Sam-si in Episode 19 (Main Villain)	
Eric Li	Mo Sam-si 武三思	Prince of Leung; Mo Chak-tin's nephew Mo Sing-chi's cousin Mo Yin-ming and Mo Yin-tak's uncle Killed Ngan Sui-wan in Episode 19; Expelled to the border by Mo Chak-tin in Episode 20 (Main villain)	
Stephen Huynh	Mo Yin-ming 武延明	Warlord; Mo Sing-chi and Ngan Sui-wan's eldest son Mo Sam-si's nephew Mo Yin-tak's elder brother Consort Chun's lover Killed Consort Chun by mistake in Episode 1 Executed by Dik Yan-kit in Episode 2 (Villain)	
Stephen Wong	Mo Yin-tak 武延德	Warlord; Mo Sing-chi and Ngan Sui-wan's second son Mo Sam-si's nephew Mo Yin-ming's younger brother Sheung-koon Yuen-tee's fiancé Died with Mo Sing-chi in Episode 20 (Semi-villain)	

=== The Sung family ===
Cast	Role	Description	Age
Mimi Chu	Cheung So-ngor 張素娥	A casino and brothel owner Sung Ting-yuk's mother Killed by Mo Sing-chi in Episode 19	
Sunny Chan	Sung Ting-yuk 宋庭玉	A constable Cheung So-ngor's son Dik Ching-luen's fiancé Dik Yan-kit's subordinate Killed by Mo Sing-chi in Episode 19	30
Lau Kong	Sung Cheung-kwai 宋祥貴	Sung family housekeeper Sung Yat-fu's father	
Lam King-kong	Sung Yat-fu 宋一虎	Sung Cheung-kwai's son	
Wong Fung Ha	Chau Kuk 秋菊	Cheung So-ngor's maiden Killed by Mo Sing-chi in Episode 19	

=== The Cho family ===
Cast	Role	Description
Law Lok-lam	Cho Chin-hang 曹展鏗	Leung Choi-dip's husband Cho-yuet and Cho-hon's father Dik Yan-kit's father-in-law
Alice Fung So-bor	Leung Choi-dip 梁彩蝶	Cho Chin-hang's second wife Cho-yuet's stepmother Cho-hon's mother Dik Yan-kit's mother-in-law
Sonija Kwok	Cho-yuet 曹月	Cho Chin-hang's daughter Leung Choi-dip's stepdaughter Cho-hon's half-sister Dik Yan-kit's second wife
Fred Cheng	Cho-hon 曹漢	Cho Chin-hang and Leung Choi-dip's son Cho-yuet's half-brother Dik Yan-kit's brother-in-law Expelled to Cangzhou for the dynasty's gold loss

=== The royal court of the Zhou dynasty ===
Cast	Role	Description	Age
Rebecca Chan	Mo Chak-tin 武則天	Queen regnant of Zhou; Lee Hin's mother Consort Wai, Consort Chor, Consort Chun's mother-in-law Mo Sing-chi and Mo Sam-si's aunt Sheung-koon Yuen-yee's superior	70
Raymond Cho	Lee Hin 李顯	Former Emperor of Tang; Degraded to "Prince of Lu Ling" by Mo Chak-tin; Mo Chak-tin's son Consort Wai, Consort Chor, Consort Chun's husband Promoted to Crown Prince in Episode 20	40
Claire Yiu	Consort Wai 韋妃	Mo Chak-tin's daughter-in-law Lee Hin's concubine Consort Chor's enemy (Villain)	
Queenie Chu	Consort Chor 楚妃	Mo Chak-tin's daughter-in-law Lee Hin's concubine Consort Wai's enemy Executed by Mo Chak Tin in Episode 18 (Villain)	
Tracy Ip	Consort Chun 秦妃	Mo Chak-tin's daughter-in-law Lee Hin's concubine Consort Chor's enemy Mo Yin-ming's mistress Accidentally killed by Mo Yin-ming in Episode 1	
Leila Tong	Sheung-koon Yuen-yee 上官婉兒	Mo Chak-tin's secretary and trusted follower Cheng Ping's daughter Mo Yin-tak's fiancée	20
Karen Lee	Yee Mui 綺梅	Maid of Honor; Bribed by Ngan Sui-wan to change medicines taken by Mo Chak-tin; Committed suicide in Episode 9 (Villain)	
Lily Li	Cheng Ping 鄭萍	Sheung-koon Yuen-yee's mother Failed to kill Mo Chak-tin by poisoning and committed suicide in Episode 11 (Villain)	

== Viewership ratings ==
The following is a table that includes a list of the total ratings points based on television viewership. "Viewers in millions" refers to the number of people, derived from TVB Jade ratings (not including TVB HD Jade), in Hong Kong who watched the episode live. The peak number of viewers are in brackets.

Week	Episode(s)	Average points	Peaking points	Viewers (in millions)	References
1	1 — 5	28	—	1.79 (—)	
2	6 — 10	30	34	1.92 (2.18)	
3	11 — 15	31	36	2.05 (2.31)	
4	16 — 20*	31	34	2.05 (2.18)	
*Episode 20, the finale episode, peaked at 32 points with 2.10 million viewers.
