= Who Wants a Baby? =

Hong Kong television series (2018)

- Also known as: BB來了
- Genre: Drama; Family; Romance
- Written by: Wong Bing-yi
- Directed by: Liu Chun-shek; Wan Chi-wai; Leung Ting-hin; Yeung Ka-ning; Wong Lap-gong; Wong Chi-wa
- Starring: Ali Lee; Lai Lok-yi
- Opening theme: "Having You" by Ka-yee Tam
- Country of origin: Hong Kong
- Original language: Cantonese
- No. of episodes: 20

Production
- Producer: Liu Chun-shek
- Production location: Hong Kong
- Running time: 43 minutes
- Production company: TVB

Original release
- Network: TVB Jade
- Release: July 9 – August 3, 2018

Who Wants a Baby? (Chinese: BB來了; lit. 'Baby Is Coming') is a Hong Kong television series created and produced by television network TVB. It premiered on 9 July 2018 and continued until 3 August 2018 for 20 episodes. With parenting as the main topic starring Ali Lee and Lai Lok-yi, it follows the story of a young couple who is having their first child and the family conflicts they encounter during the process. The show was well-received for its realistic storyline, with Ali Lee winning "Best Actress" at the 51st TVB Anniversary Awards for her starring role.

== Cast ==
- Ali Lee as Ellen Tong Tim-yee: Elvis's wife who works as a fashion buyer
- Lai Lok-yi as Elvis Yip Chi-ting: Ellen's husband, the manager of a high-end restaurant and bar
- 8 young actors as Yip Wan: Ellen and Elvis's daughter, from newborn to one-year-old
  - Chan Ying-man
  - Wong Sing-nga
  - Chan Fei-yi
  - Tse Wo-yau
  - Lee Ka-lam
  - Leung Sum-yu
  - Ng Man-yuet
  - Tang Hau-yuen
- Stefan Wong as Frankie Lee Koon-chung: Elvis's boss and friend, owner of a high-end restaurant and bar
- Samantha Ko as Katrina Hui Ching: Ellen's high school friend, who works as a bartender at Frankie's restaurant
- Tsui Wing as Ben Yip Chi-yoon: Elvis's older brother
- Griselda Yeung as Wong Kai-miu: a doula who works at the postpartum confinement business, Po On Sum
- Claire Yiu as Belle Hui Long: Katrina's older sister; she works as a doula at Po On Sum
- Angelina Lo as Joyce Hong Lai-jing: Elvis's mother and Yip Wan's paternal grandmother
- Rebecca Chan as Christina Leung Yuet-sim: Ellen's mother and Yip Wan's maternal grandmother
- Law Lok-lam as Tong Chow: Ellen's father and Yip Wan's maternal grandfather
- Carlo Ng as Choi Cheung-ching: Chinese medicine physician

== Plot ==
Ellen Tong and Elvis Yip have been married for a year. An unexpected pregnancy leaves them unprepared, as they are used to a spending and traveling lifestyle. Ellen, a strong-minded woman, does not want to get help from either her husband's or her own family. However, for the sake of her unborn daughter, she takes maternity leave and then, with Elvis, moves into a flat in the same high-rise building as her mother-in-law. After giving birth, she often clashes with her mother-in-law due to differences in baby care, leaving Elvis sandwiched between the two. Ellen eventually quits her job and takes over the postpartum confinement business, Po On Sum. In taking care of this business operations, conflicts between Ellen and Elvis arise where Ellen stands firm on getting justice when an issue comes up—she emphasizes being a role model to her daughter when it comes to moral subjects. In contrast, Elvis worries more about financial matters to keep the business running regardless of the situation.

One of the employees at Po On Sum is Wong Kai-miu, who lives with her son, Lung, and struggles to make ends meet after her husband ran away to avoid his gambling debt. Elvis purposely reveals Wong's family story to the media to give Po On Sum more exposure. After Wong's ran-away husband catches the news story, he shows up and kidnaps Lung. Seizing this opportunity, Elvis rescues Lung but, at the same time, uses calculated tactics to create a sensational "supreme dad" image of himself to the public. He becomes a spokesperson for several brands, displaying his savvy marketing side and helping Po On Sum gain various money-making opportunities. Ellen eventually finds out and confronts her husband's gimmick, leaving their marriage turning into jeopardy. The story ends where they reconcile after Elvis posts a video online showing himself being remorseful. The epilogue emphasizes the ultimate life lesson is learning to love and be loved in the bittersweet and imperfect moments.

== Production and background ==
The series was produced by Liu Chun-shek and filmed from November 2017 to March 2018. It utilized first-time parenting with postpartum confinements as the main theme. The child character, Yip Wan, was portrayed by eight young actors of different ages throughout the show, the youngest being only 15-day-old. The script supervisor, Wong Bing-yi, is a first-time mother at the time and touched on the storyline with her own experience as well as others'. In order to have the correct knowledge of confinement care, the cast received an instruction course from the professional confinement teachers before filming.

== Music ==
Track Listing
No.	Title	Lyrics	Music	Artist(s)	Length
1.	"Having You (有了你)"	Cheng Kwok-kong	Chung Chiu-fung	Ka-yee Tam	4:18

Note: The theme song was a classic remake originally released by Danny Chan in 1981.

== Reception and ratings ==
Who Wants a Baby? received favorable response from the audience, being the third most watched TVB television series of the year. The finale peaked at 30.2 rating points, approximately 1.9 million viewers. Wong Tsz-hang from HK01 noted the childbirth and parenting topic discussed in the show to be "resonating with daily life". Wong also praised the cast's acting, in particular Ali Lee, noting her as the "treasure" of the television series. An editor writing for Oriental Sunday also commented on its "realistic storyline" with "straightforward, heartfelt dialogues".

Week	Episodes	Airing dates	Average ratings (Note: According to Hong Kong's TV rating system, each rating point represents approximately 64,670 viewers.)	Peak ratings	Ref.
1	1 – 5	9–13 July 2018	28.8 points		
2	6 – 10	16–20 July 2018	28.3 points		
3	11 – 15	23–27 July 2018	27.8 points		
4	16 – 20	30 July–3 August 2018	27.5 points	30.2 points	
Average Total:			28.1 points		

== Awards and nominations ==
Year	Award	Category	Nominated work	Results	Ref.
2018	51st TVB Anniversary Awards	Best Actress	Ali Lee	Won	
2018	51st TVB Anniversary Awards	My Favorite Male Character In A Television Series	Lai Lok-yi (for Elvis Yip)	Nominated	
2018	51st TVB Anniversary Awards	My Favorite Female Character In A Television Series	Ali Lee (for Ellen Tong)	Nominated	
2018	51st TVB Anniversary Awards	Best Supporting Actor	Tsui Wing	Nominated	
2018	51st TVB Anniversary Awards	Best Supporting Actress	Angelina Lo	Nominated	
