= Steps (TV series) =

- Official poster
- 舞動全城
- Genre: Modern Drama
- Starring: Steven Ma; Bernice Liu; Kate Tsui; Wayne Lai; Fala Chen; Claire Yiu; Stephen Wong; Matthew Ko; Stephen Huynh
- Opening theme: "I'm So In Love With You" by Bernice Liu
- Country of origin: Hong Kong
- Original language: Cantonese
- No. of episodes: 20

Production
- Producer: Leung Choi Yuen
- Running time: 45 minutes (approx.)

Original release
- Network: TVB
- Release: September 10 – October 5, 2007

Steps (Traditional Chinese: 舞動全城) is a TVB modern drama series broadcast in September 2007.

== Synopsis ==
Exotic Salsa, Fussy CHA CHA CHA,
Flirtatious Tango, A Mixture of Dancing Harmony

Ballroom dancing emphasizes rhythm and mutual trust between the partners. If we can apply the same philosophy to our daily communication practices, we are likely to find ourselves in greater harmony and our lives will surely be enriched.

Dance lover Lee Sum-Ying (Bernice Liu) is going to audition for a place in the Hong Kong Dance Company. Before the audition starts, she bumps into her brother Lee Lik-Keung (Wayne Lai) and his colleague Ching Ka-Tsun (Steven Ma) at a supermarket, where she is accidentally run over by Tsun’s trolley and hurts herself. Due to her arm injury, Ying does not perform well in the audition and fails the assessment. At the invitation of Tsun’s mother, Ying goes to teach Latin dance at a local community center, in the hope that she can save up enough money for further studies abroad. Ying has a very warm personality and is well liked by many of her students. Her popularity eventually lands her a teaching job at a dance workshop, which makes another dance tutor and Tsun's younger sister, Ching Ka-Man (Fala Chen), incredibly jealous. Man dislikes Ying so much that she means to make things difficult for her in every possible way.

Yeung Sze-Man (Kate Tsui), the daughter of Tsun’s boss, is appointed to take charge of the company. In order to improve staff morale, Man has announced a series of reforms. She needs her staff to learn dancing so that they can get more physical exercise. Ying is hired as the dance teacher of Tsun and his colleagues. Tsun, who has some knowledge in dancing, has soon resumed his interest in this expressive form of art. Ying and Tsun have gradually developed a close bond with each other and even decided to take part in an international dance competition as partners, but the pair’s relationship is put to the test when Tsun and Keung later fall out over business matters. The discord between the two men has put Ying in dilemma.

Not long after, one of the employees, who has worked at the company for long time until being fired by Sze-Man, told her father about the reforms and his being fired. As a result, Sze-Man was relieved of her duties. Sze Man's life took a turn for the worse when she found out that her boyfriend Dickson has married already. After some time, they broke up. But during the relationship, Keung's brother-in-law has a crush on her but didn't know how to say it to her.

Meanwhile, Keung and Tsun were still mad at each other. This makes Ying and Tsun's relationship difficult. But when they found out about the fired employee's plan to take over the company, they worked together to bring him down. In the end, they got along. However, Sum-Ying's eyes were damaged due to a previous injury and had to take surgery.

Before the surgery even began, she was set to be in a dance competition with Tsun as her partner. But during this time, Ka-Man was as angry as ever with Ying for two reasons. One: Ying "takes" Ka-Man's spot in the company commercial. Two: She thinks her mother thinks Ying dances better than her. After an altercation with her brother Tsun and her mother (by which it ends with Tsun slapping her in the face for pushing their mom), Ka-Man leaves the home.

When they found Ka-Man, they also found out that she is the student of her mother's rival, who has a dislike against her. The mother and rival started dancing to see who is better, but the rival intentionally stepped on Tsun's mother's leg, making her unable to dance forever. Tsun and Ying enters the competition to not only avenge Tsun's mother, but also to help Ka-Man.

At the competition, Ying and Tsun enter the competition along with Ka-Man to advance to the finals. The rival however has ordered her to use damaging dance moves to kick them out of the competition. The incentive of this, however, is to see her rival suffer with a family spat. But Ka-Man, seeing that Ying is injured, relents. When the rival disowns her as her pupil, Ka-Man accidentally pushes her down (actually if you watch carefully, Ka-Man didn't push her down but the rival just trip over herself anyway) the rival's leg was damaged. As a result, Ka-Man was sent to jail, but Tsun and Ying forgive her.

Some time later, Ka-Man was released from jail (Not Shown) and the company held a party. During that time, Tsun (with the help of Keung, Sze-Man and the others) proposes to Ying and she accepts. The series ends with everyone dancing to Papa Loves Mambo.

== Cast ==
Cast	Role	Description
Steven Ma	Ching Ka-Tsun 程嘉俊	Herbal Tea Company Clerk; Lee Sum-Ying's boyfriend. Ching Ka-Man's older brother.
Bernice Liu	Lee Sum-Ying (Samantha) 李心盈	Dance Instructor; Ching Ka-Tsun's girlfriend. Lee Lik-Keung's younger sister.
Wayne Lai	Lee Lik-Keung 李力強	Herbal Tea Company Clerk; Lee Sum-Ying's older brother. Yau Lum-Lum's husband.
Claire Yiu	Yau Lam-Lam (Donna) 游琳琳	Herbal Tea Company Clerk; Lee Lik-Keung's wife.
Kate Tsui	Yeung Sze-Man (Victoria) 楊詩曼	Herbal Tea Company Manager; Mai Dik-Sang's ex-girlfriend. Yau Shang-Dat's girlfriend.
Matthew Ko	Mai Dik-Sang (Dickson) 米迪生	Yeung Sze-Man's ex-boyfriend.
Fala Chen	Ching Ka-Man (Karmen) 程嘉汶	Ching Ka-Tsun's younger sister. In Jail(Release)Not Shown-Last Episode
Stephen Huynh	Cho Wah-Lun (Wallace) 曹華倫	Dance Instructor
Manna Chan	Ching Dik Bo-Bo (Bobo) 程狄寶寶	Dance Instructor; Ching Ka-Tsun and Ching Ka-Man's mother.
Kwok Fung (郭峰)	Yeung Hon-To (Tom) 楊漢滔	Herbal Tea Company Owner; Yeung Sze-Man's father.
Wu Fung	Yeung Sing (Patrick) 楊昇	Yeung Sze-Man's grandfather. Yeung Hon-To's father.
Stephen Wong	Yau Shang-Dat 游上達	Herbal Tea Company Clerk; Yau Lam-Lam's younger brother. Yeung Sze-Man's boyfriend.
Akina Hong Wah (康華)	(Judy) 羅茱迪	Herbal Tea Company secretary.

== Awards and nominations ==
=== Awards ===
40th TVB Anniversary Awards (2007)

- "Best Actress in a Supporting Role" (Fala Chen - Karmen Ching Ka-Man)

=== Nominations ===
40th TVB Anniversary Awards (2007)

- "Best Drama"
- "Best Actor in a Leading Role" (Steven Ma - Ching Ka-Tsun)
- "Best Actor in a Leading Role" (Wayne Lai - Lee Lik-Keung)
- "Best Actress in a Leading Role" (Bernice Liu - Samantha Lee Sum-Ying)
- "Best Actress in a Leading Role" (Kate Tsui - Victoria Yeung Sze-Man)
- "Best Actress in a Supporting Role" (Fala Chen - Karmen Ching Ka-Man)
- "Best Actress in a Supporting Role" (Claire Yiu - Donna Yau Lam-Lam)
- "My Favourite Male Character Role" (Steven Ma - Ching Ka-Tsun)
- "My Favourite Male Character Role" (Wayne Lai - Lee Lik-Keung)
- "My Favourite Female Character Role" (Bernice Liu - Samantha Lee Sum-Ying)
- "My Favourite Female Character Role" (Kate Tsui - Victoria Yeung Sze-Man)
- "My Favourite Female Character Role" (Fala Chen - Karmen Ching Ka-Man)

== Viewership ratings ==
	Week	Episode	Average Points	Peaking Points	References
1	September 10–14, 2007	1 — 5	31	33	
2	September 17–21, 2007	6 — 10	30	33	
3	September 24–28, 2007	11 — 15	29	—	
4	October 1–5, 2007	16 — 20	32	36	
