= Jack Wu =

Hong Kong actor, singer and TV host

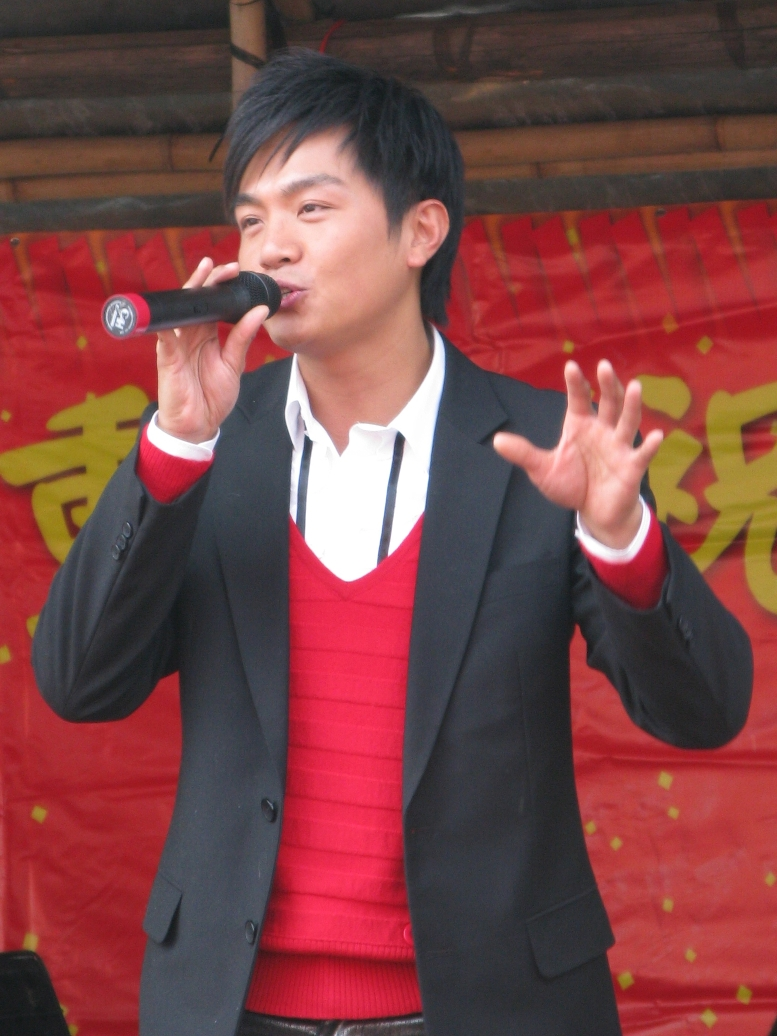
- Wu in February 2008
- Born: 23 August 1977 (age 49); British Hong Kong
- Other name: 胡仔、大力三
- Education: S.K.H. Chu Oi Primary School; Tung Wah Group of Hospitals Mrs. Wu York Yu Memorial College; Po Leung Kuk Yao Ling Sun College
- Occupations: Actor; singer; TV host
- Years active: 1996–present
- Agent: 2000 to present: TVB
- Notable work: To Grow with Love

Chinese name
- Traditional Chinese: 胡諾言
- Simplified Chinese: 胡诺言
Transcriptions
Standard Mandarin
- Hanyu Pinyin: Hú Nuòyán
Yue: Cantonese
- Jyutping: Wu^{4} Nok^{6} Jin^{4}
- Website: Official Weibo

Jack Wu Lok Yin (Chinese: 胡诺言; pinyin: Hú Nuòyán, born on 23 August 1977) is a Hong Kong actor, singer and TV host, currently a basic artist contract artist of TVB.

== Background and family ==
In his early years, Wu grew up in Lei Muk Shue Fire Services Quarters, Wo Yi Hop Road, Tsuen Wan District. He came from a simple family where his dad was a fireman and his mom was a seamstress. He has a little brother. Wu volunteered to be a firefighter when he was young. His name Lok Yin is artist name.

(Note: 關於胡諾言家庭背景和年少時志願的資料出自香港電台第二台廣播節目《守下留情》於2019年3月18日播出的胡諾言訪問。)He attended S.K.H. Chu Oi Primary School, Tung Wah Group of Hospitals Mrs. Wu York Yu Memorial College and Po Leung Kuk Yao Ling Sun College; graduated in 1994. When he was in middle school, he was a reserve player of the volleyball team. He also participates in home economics classes.

Wu's wife was Hong Kong TVB artist now Social Media Influencer June Chan Kei. The two started dating after playing the role of sister and brother in the TV series The King of Yesterday and Tomorrow, and they had known each other for more than ten years. After dating (Note: 資料出自香港電台第二台廣播節目《守下留情》於2019年3月22日播出的胡諾言訪問。(The information comes from an interview with Hu No-yin broadcast on Radio Television Hong Kong 2's radio program Show Me No Mercy on March 22, 2019)) for nearly seven years, the two got married with wedding banquet at The Peninsula Hong Kong on April 27, 2009. On September 3, 2009, the eldest daughter Hu Zhiling (Jay) was born. On November 28, 2012, the second daughter Hu Zhiyou (Jacey) was born. On October 14, 2016, the youngest son Hu Haokun (Jayden) was born.

== Career ==
Wu later participated in the singing competition at the fire station party and eventually won the championship. A few months later, he received encouragement from his mother and was attracted by the car prize, so in 1996, with Daniel Chan's song "Knowing Everything About You" 《了解你的所有》, he went to Hong Kong Cultural Center in Tsim Sha Tsui to participate in the Big Echo Summer Karaoke Competition hosted by Go East Entertainment, winning the championship and signed as a singer under Warner Music Hong Kong. (Note: 關於胡諾言就讀中學時和參加歌唱比賽經過的資料出自香港電台第二台廣播節目《守下留情》於2019年3月19日播出的胡諾言訪問。)

In 1997, Wu released his solo album One Promise; Boy Next Door「鄰家男孩」for the first time. Although the song "一個諾言" increased his fame, the sales of the album did not meet expectations. Later, he was transformed into Fat Boy 「肥男孩」. Unfortunately, due to piracy issues, his development was not as good as expected.

Finally, in 2000, he became a TVB managerial artist contract. Before Wu's transformation, Warner Music Hong Kong released another album for him, 《愛玩火》, and arranged for him to go to Australia to shoot a music video for the song "《無重狀態》". Lau Lai Ping (Apple姐), chairman of the board of directors and boss of BIG ECHO I-BOX, knew that Wu had worked hard to develop his singing career, so she suggested that he find another way out by becoming an artist at TVB.

(Note: 關於胡諾言當上歌手經過的資料出自香港電台第二台廣播節目《守下留情》於2019年3月20日播出的胡諾言訪問。)At first, he mainly served as a tv host and participated in travel specials. Later, because he wanted to develop in many aspects, he recommended himself to the producer Leung Choi Yuen to film his first TV series Lost in Love. After being recommended to other TV station producer by Leung Choi Yuen, Wu began to participate in more TV series. In 2003, he was assigned by Tommy Leung Ka Shu to play a relatively important role in Net Deception. In 2006, he joined the hosting team of Scoop. (Note: 關於胡諾言加入電視台後動向的資料出自香港電台第二台廣播節目《守下留情》於2019年3月21日播出的胡諾言訪問。)

Although Wu has never become a first-line artist, he still has a certain degree of popularity. In 2012, he was selected as the most diverse artist by China Mainland Network. In 2014, he played the leading role for the first time in the live-action drama Shades of Life. In 2018, he and Sharon Chan were invited to serve as hosts of Cantopop at 50 (流行經典50年), replacing Raymond Cho and Karen Tong.

In addition, due to his love for marathon running, Wu formed Crazy Runner (one of the cliques in the HK Entertainment Industry) with his friends Joel Chan, Benjamin Yuen, Brian Tse and the girls of the Nonsense Club (胡說八道會) Nancy Wu, Paisley Wu, Elaine Yiu, Selena Lee and Mandy Wong.

In December 2022, the from managerial artist contract changed to basic artist contract.

== Performance works ==
=== TV series ===
Year	Title	Role	Notes
TVB
2000	Lost in Love	Zhūkèyǒng (Pig Jai)	
2001	Colourful Life	Zhàowēi	
2002	Burning Flame II	Kui Jai	
2003	Not Just a Pretty Face	Guòshǎolóng	
2003	The King of Yesterday and Tomorrow	Po On	Support Role
2003	Triumph in the Skies	Rex	
2003	Love Paradise in Regalia Bay	Doctor	
2004	Net Deception	Tong Ka-Ming	Main Role
2005	The Zone	Ah Wai	Main Role
2005	The Gâteau Affairs	Sun Yu Le	Support Role
2005	Real Kung Fu	Siu Fu-Yung	
2006	The Biter Bitten	Ng Fuk Sang	Support Role
2006	Forensic Heroes	Ho Yiu-Kwong	Guest Role
2006	Love Guaranteed	Fan Youyuan	
2006	To Grow with Love	Lam Koon-Hei	Nominated – Best Supporting Actor (Top 5)
2007	Ten Brothers	Strong Three (大力三)	Main Role
2008	Phoenix Rising	Ma Hak	Support Role
2008	The Silver Chamber of Sorrows	Chau Chi Shing	Main Role
2008	Forensic Heroes II	Yip Chi-Man	Guest Role, Ep. 1–4
2008	Moonlight Resonance	Gan Tai Cho (Young)	Guest Role
2009	The Winter Melon Tale	Chung Yiu-Jo	Guest Role
2010	Cupid Stupid	Simon	Guest Role
2010	A Fistful of Stances	Ho Ho-yin	
2010	The Mysteries of Love	Ko Chi Chim	Support Role
2010	Growing Through Life	Hoi Yeung	Support Role
2010	Every Move You Make	Edmond Tang	Guest Role
2011	Yes, Sir. Sorry, Sir!	Yam Tak Kwong	Support Role
2011	The Life and Times of a Sentinel	Ha Seen	Support Role
2011	Bottled Passion	Yuen Yau Hin	Support Role
2012	Three Kingdoms RPG	Lau Kei	Support Role
2012	King Maker	Yang Chun	
2012	Friendly Fire	Albert Ko	
2013	Come Home Love	Chengdong	
2013	A Change of Heart	Yi Jiaqiang	
2014	Gilded Chopsticks	Lei Wai	Support Role
2014	The Ultimate Addiction	Yuen Seung Him	Support Role
2014	Shades of Life	Ko Ho Pan	Main Role
2014	Tiger Cubs II	Yan	Guest Role, Ep. 7
2016	Speed of Life	Hung Yan	Guest Role, Ep. 1 & 17–20
2016	Short End of the Stick	Fung Chun Sai	Support Role
2016	Presumed Accidents	Jeff Ho Ken Lap	Guest Role, Ep. 20–21
2017	May Fortune Smile on You	Gam Jam	Support Role
2017	Provocateur	Lam Shun Fai / Dai Au Gwai / Ah Gwai	Support Role
2017	My Dearly Sinful Mind	Tsang Kwok Ho / "Alan" (Sau Yee's boyfriend)	Support Role
2018	Succession War	Janggiya Nayancheng	Support Role
2018	The Stunt	Yue Wai Nam / Raymond	Support Role
2019	ICAC Investigators 2019	Zau Sing	Guest Role, Ep. 2
2019	Justice Bao: The First Year	Yau Chan Dak	Guest Role, Ep. 16–18
2021	The Runner	Qian Zhan, James (Qian Wei's cousin)	Support Role
2021	The Line Watchers	Alvin	Support Role
2022	ICAC Investigators 2022	Lau Hok Si / Lau Sir	Support Role
2022	A Perfect Man	Gu Ga Nam / "Rain"	Support Role
2023	The Invisibles	Lok Nga Shuen	Main Role
Shaw Brothers
2019	Flying Tiger II	Wong Gwok Keung (Young)	Guest Role
2022	Mission Run	Ray Chin	Support Role, Ep. 4–8

=== Host program (TVB) ===
Year	Title	Notes
1999	(週末新地帶)	
2000	(週末青春派)	
2001	(和你玩得喜)	
2002	(兒歌金曲)	
2002–2004	Jade Music Station (翡翠音樂幹線)	
2003	(玄妙無窮)	
2004	(雙春閏月結佳期)	
2004	(眾裡尋她報料大行動)	
2004	(港姐熱賣新聞)	
2004	(勁歌金曲優秀選第二回)	
2004–2005	(優質生活派)	
2005–2009	Scoop (東張西望)	
2005–2007	Muscle Ranking (筋肉擂台)	
2007	Is That Right? (問題娛樂圈)	
2008	What Fine Couples (眉精眼企)	
2008	2008 Summer Olympics (北京奧運)	
2010	The Green Room (今日VIP)	
2012	Open Sesame (開館有益)	
2013	Where Are We Going, Dad? (爸B也Upgrade)	
2014	Where Are We Going, Dad? 2 (爸B也Upgrade 2)	
2017	Shall We Run (一起跑過的日子)	
2018	Feng Shui for the New Year (Season 3) (新春開運王 (第三輯))	
2018	Cantopop at 50 (流行經典50年)	Ep. 34–44, 46–55, 57–60, 62–63 & 65–84
2018	Big Big Bay (大灣區 活好D)	
2018	Miss Chinese Vancouver Pageant (溫哥華華裔小姐競選)	
2019	Big Big Bay Season 2 (大灣區 活好D第二輯)	
2021	Cantopop at 50 2021 (流行經典50年 2021)	Ep. 9
2021	How to Buy a House2 (我要做業主2)	
2022 to present	Big City Shop 2022 (流行都市)	

=== Variety shows (By Broadcast date) ===
Year	Title	Notes
2008	Super Trio Series 8: Super Trio Supreme (鐵甲無敵獎門人)	Guest, Ep. 10
2009	Outsmart (財智達人)	
2009	Once A Fishing Village... (掌故王)	
2009	Neighborhood Treasures (千奇百趣)	
2010	Big Fun Hong Kong (千奇百趣香港地)	
2010	Super Trio Series 9: Super Trio Game Master (超級遊戲獎門人)	Guest, Ep. 5
2010	Fun with Liza and Gods (荃加福祿壽)	
2010	Neighborhood Treasures 2 (千奇百趣Summer Fun)	
2011	Big Fun Cartoon (千奇百趣省港澳)	
2011	Paw Love (寵愛有家)	
2012	What Fine Couples (登登登對)	
2012	Neighborhood Treasures 4 (千奇百趣高B班)	
2012	Big Fun SE Asia (千奇百趣東南亞)	
2013	Midnight Munchies (夜宵磨)	
2014	I am Boss (我要做老闆)	
2015	The Million Dollar Minute (超強選擇1分鐘)	
2016	Feng Shui for the New Year (新春開運王)	
2016	I Heart HK (我愛香港)	Guest, Ep. 12
2017	Love at Last Sight (1+1的幸福)	
2018	The Race (誇極限大挑戰)	
2018	Cooking Beauties (美女廚房 (第三輯))	Guest (Judge), Ep. 14

=== TV advertising (TVB) ===
Year	Title	Role	Notes
2007	地鐵特約：心的服務		
2010	緣系OSIM按摩小梳化：愛心意	First Male Lead Andy (程仁)	(Co-starring Nancy Wu, Bosco Wong, Bowie Wu, Kwong Chor Fai)
2023	Mass Transit Railway (MTR) 港鐵 Guangzhou-Shenzhen-Hong Kong High Speed Rail Hong Kong Section 廣深港高鐵香港段		

=== Music video appearances ===
Year	Singer	Song title	Notes
1997	Sammi Cheng	《情變》	
2001	Andy Hui	《單手擁抱》	
2003	Steven Ma	《糟蹋》	
2007	Mandy Chiang	《失散》	
2007	Jack Wu	《忍者變法》	The first Cantonese version opening theme of the anime Naruto
2007	Jack Wu	《忍舞》	The second Cantonese version opening theme of the anime Naruto

=== Stage play ===
Year	Title	Notes
2002 to 2003	Xiguan Style 《西關風情》	
June 2017	Thunderstorm Against Sunrise 《雷雨對日出》	

=== Radio drama ===
Year	Title	Notes
2000	Residence Opposite Door《對門居》 (RTHK)	Plays the male lead An Ning.

=== Radio program ===
- 人間定格

== Musical works ==
Album	Album name	Album type	Label company	Release date	Songs
1st	One Promise	Album	勁力星（Production） Warner Music Hong Kong (Distribution）	21 June 1997	1. 忘記時空（天地無用）; 2. 他媽歌詞; 3. 我有我 妳愛我; 4. 一個諾言; 5. 愛誰; 6. 發洩; 7. 自己的事; 8. 唱片店; 9. 173; 10. 錯誤引導; 11. 一個諾言（卡拉Ok版）
2nd	愛玩火	EP	勁力星（Production） Warner Music Hong Kong (Distribution）	July 1999	CD: 1. 愛玩火; 2. 戀愛季節（蔣嘉瑩合唱）; 3. 今天最後一班機; 4. 無重狀態; 5. :) = 空氣; VCD: 1. 愛玩火 MV; 2. 無重狀態 MV

=== Compilation ===
Album	Album name	Album Type	Label Company	Release Date	Songs
1st	星聲相識精選	Featured	Warner Music Hong Kong	1998	1. 戀愛態度1998 – 郭富城; 2. 理想對象 – 鄭秀文; 3. 繫我心弦 – 葉蒨文; 4. 風裡密碼 – 郭富城; 5. 哭泣遊戲 – 鄭秀文; 6. 糊塗 – 葉蒨文; 7. 祝大家好過 – 鄭秀文; 8. 如果妳認真過 – 郭富城; 9. 為何又是這樣錯 – 鄭秀文; 10. 我的世界盛事 – 胡諾言; 11. 喜 – 紀炎炎; 12. 回頭一看 – 呂方; 13. 戀愛是(二人前) – 胡諾言; 14. E-714342 – 楊千嬅; 15. 普通朋友 – 梁漢文; 16. 與我常在 – 陳奕迅

=== Animation songs ===
- 2007: "Ninja Reform" 忍者變法 (Cantonese opening theme of the anime Naruto Season 1 (Episodes 1–52))
- 2008: "Ninja Dance" 忍舞 (the second Cantonese opening theme of the anime Naruto Season 2 (Episodes 53–158))

== Group channels song results ==
Group channels song results
Album	Song	903	RTHK	997	TVB	Remarks
Year 1997
One Promise	一個諾言	/	/	/	/	
One Promise	忘記時空（天地無用）	/	/	/	/	
One Promise	錯誤引導	/	/	/	/	
Year 1998
星聲相識	戀愛是「二人前」	17	13	15	10	
星聲相識	我的世界盛事	–	20	–	–	
Year 1999
愛玩火	愛玩火	–	20	8	/	
愛玩火	無重狀態	–	–	–	–	
愛玩火	戀愛季節	–	–	20	–	Duet with Vivian Chiang Kar Ying (蔣嘉瑩)
Year 2000
華納千禧世紀好精選Vol.2	這一分鐘像我一樣	–	–	–	–	

The total number of champion songs on each channel
903	RTHK	997	TVB	Remarks
0	0	0	0	The total number of champion songs on each channel：0

== Awards ==
- "New Town's Hottest Children's Songs Award Ceremony 2008" 《新城勁爆兒歌頒獎禮2008》"Newtown's Hottest Children's Songs" 「新城勁爆兒歌」- "Ninja Dance" 《忍舞》
