= Phoenix Rising (Hong Kong TV series) =

- 蘭花刼
- Genre: Period Drama
- Starring: Louisa So; Sunny Chan; Kristal Tin; Leila Tong; Jack Wu
- Opening theme: "蘭花刼" by Kelly Chen
- Country of origin: Hong Kong
- Original language: Cantonese
- No. of episodes: 20

Production
- Producer: Terry Tong
- Running time: 45 minutes (approx.)

Original release
- Network: TVB
- Release: 9 July 2007

Phoenix Rising (Traditional Chinese: 蘭花刼) is a TVB period drama series released overseas in July 2007 and aired on TVB Pay Vision Channel in March 2008. The drama was well received from the viewer in international broadcast. The show has been compared to 1989's hit drama, Looking Back In Anger.

The Series was subsequently released on 2 January 2009 on Cambodia cable TV, PPCTV as the last country in showing it.

In an unprecedented move by TVB, 11 years after production, it has been announced that the drama will premiere from 29 May 2017 on TVB Jade, with footage and audio digitally remastered for broadcast.

== Plot ==
Kong Lai-Nga, Yim Pui-Woo and So Fei are sisters. Their parents died at birth, so the three of them were sent to orphanages and were later adopted into three different homes with different backgrounds. Yim Pui-Woo was sent to prison for killing her stepmother, but Kong Lai-Nga, wanting to save her sister, told officials that she was the one who committed the crime and went to prison instead. So Fei is a very kind person and forges evidence to save Kong Lai-Nga but gets caught and gets sent to prison, too. The three sisters and the prison owner have some hostilities; thus, the prison owner wants revenge. This series uses women in jail as its storyline, describing the dark side of women in prison.

== Cast ==
Cast	Role	Description
Louisa So	Yim Pui-Woo/Yeung Choi Yiu 炎沛湖/楊采瑤	Kong Lai-Nga's younger sister. So Fei's elder sister. Cheung Chi-Hoi's ex-wife. (Main Villain)
Sunny Chan	Yin Leung 言亮	Kong Lai-Nga's boyfriend.
Kristal Tin	Kong Lai-Nga/Yeung Choi Yue 江麗雅/楊采瑜	Yim Pui-Woo and So Fei' s elder sister. Yin Leung's girlfriend.
Leila Tong	So Fei/Yeung Choi Lam 蘇菲/楊采琳	Kong Lai-Nga and Yim Pui-Woo's younger sister.
Ben Wong	Cheung Chi-Hoi 張至凱	Yim Pui-Woo's ex-husband.
Nancy Wu	Yip Chi-Shan 葉芷珊	Prisoner
Jack Wu	Ma Hak 馬赫	Prison Doctor; Yin Leung's younger cousin.
