= Claire Yiu =

Hong Kong actress

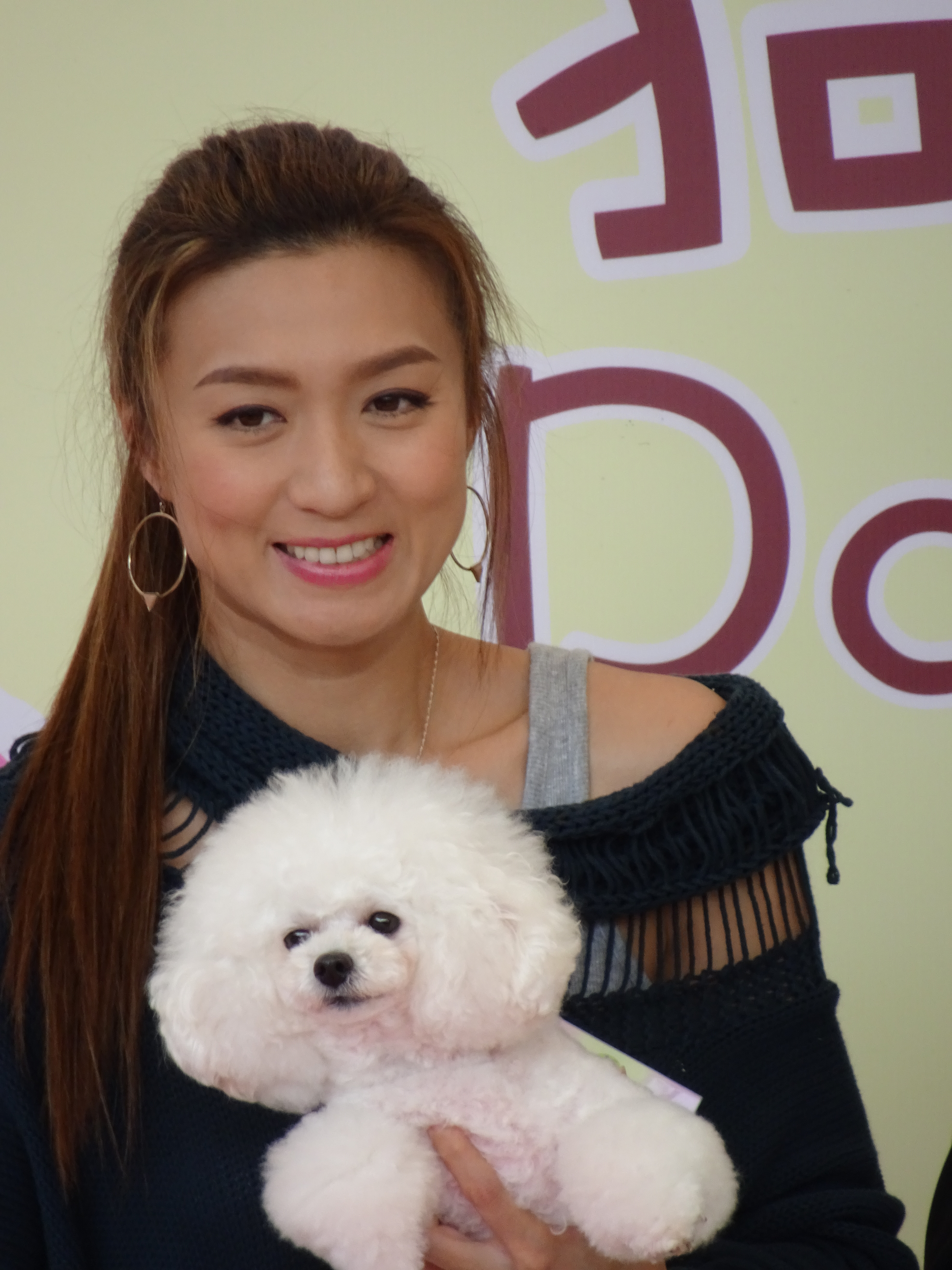
- Born: 10 August 1978 (age 47); Hong Kong
- Spouse: Thomas Lam Cho-fai (m. 2006)
- Children: Kyra Lam (2009); Kyros Lam (2012)

Chinese name
- Traditional Chinese: 姚嘉妮
Transcriptions
Standard Mandarin
- Hanyu Pinyin: Yáo Jiānī
Yue: Cantonese
- Jyutping: Jiu^{4} Gaa^{1} Nei^{4}

Claire Yiu Ka-lei (born 10 August 1978) is a Hong Kong actress contracted to TVB.

== Career ==
Yiu started her acting career after being the 2nd runner-up in the Miss Asia Pageant in 1998. After filming some ATV series, such as 海瑞鬥嚴嵩, and Ten Tigers of Guangdong (廣東十虎), she went over to TVB and filmed some minor roles in television dramas such as To Catch The Uncatchable and Healing Hands 3. She began to play more significant roles in television dramas such as To Grow with Love and Steps (TV series).

== Personal life ==
Yiu is married to former ATV actor, Thomas Lam Cho-fai. Their daughter, Kyra, was born on 20 April 2009. Their son, Kyros, was born on 30 April 2012.

== Filmography ==
=== ATV ===
- 海瑞鬥嚴嵩 (1998)
- Ten Tigers of Guangdong (1998)

=== TVB ===
| Year | Title | Role | TVB Anniversary Awards |
|---|---|---|---|
| 2001 | In the Realm Of Success | Chong Mei-yi 莊美儀 | |
| 2002 | The White Flame | Fung Siu Mei | |
| 2003 | Life Begins at Forty | Yeung Ning 楊寧 | |
| 2003 | Virtues of Harmony II | Pauline Cheung | |
| 2003 | Back To Square One | Angel | |
| 2003 | The Threat of Love 2 | Bibi | |
| 2004 | Angels of Mission | Susan Fong Siu-han 方小嫻 | |
| 2004 | To Catch the Uncatchable | Mia Chiu Mei-mei 朱美美 | |
| 2004 | Dream of Colours | Coco | |
| 2004 | Split Second | Chu Wing-kei 朱詠琪 | |
| 2005 | Healing Hands III | Grace Tai Yuk-ying 戴玉瑩 | |
| 2006 | Under the Canopy of Love | Karen Yip Ka-wan 葉嘉雲 | |
| 2006 | To Grow with Love | Rachel Sung Man-yi 宋曼頣 | |
| 2006 | Land of Wealth | Kiu Ching 喬菁 | Nominated - TVB Anniversary Award for Best Supporting Actress |
| 2007 | Steps | Donna Yau Lam Lam 游琳琳 | Nominated - TVB Anniversary Award for Best Supporting Actress |
| 2008 | A Journey Called Life | Dr. Ho (Obstetrician) | |
| 2008 | Speech of Silence | Yuen Siu-na 袁少娜 | Nominated - TVB Anniversary Award for Best Supporting Actress |
| 2008 | Moonlight Resonance | Yau Wing-lam 邱詠琳 | |
| 2009 | The Threshold of a Persona | Cheung Sze-Man 張思敏 | |
| 2010-2011 | Home Troopers | Sung Tsz-kei 宋子淇 | |
| 2011 | Only You | May | |
| 2011 | Grace Under Fire | Lee Piu-hung 李飄紅 | |
| 2011 | Ghetto Justice | Ma Cheuk Yee-tak 馬卓爾德 | |
| 2011 | The Other Truth | Chow Man 周敏 | |
| 2011 | Wax and Wane | Wong Sau-ping 王秀萍 | |
| 2011-2012 | Bottled Passion | Wan Yau 溫柔 | |
| 2012 | The Greatness of a Hero | Consort Wai 韋妃 | |
| 2014 | Black Heart White Soul | Yip Ying-sum 葉應心 | |
| 2015 | Come Home Love | Lee Ming 李明 | |
| 2015 | Captain of Destiny | Wong Tai-nui | |
| 2016 | Presumed Accidents | Mok Hei-yu 莫曦瑜 | |
| 2016 | Two Steps From Heaven | Carrie Fu Ka-yi 傅嘉兒 | |
| 2017 | May Fortune Smile on You | Tsui Sim 徐嬋 | |
| 2017 | A General, A Scholar and A Eunuch | Gillian Kwok Fung-kiu | |
| 2018 | Who Wants a Baby? | Belle Hui Long 許朗 | |
| 2018 | The Stunt | Sum Wing 沈穎 | |
| 2019 | My Life As Loan Shark | Wong Ka-yan 江嘉欣 | |
| 2019 | Girlie Days | Janice Cheung Chi-ling 張智靈 | Nominated - TVB Anniversary Award for Best Supporting Actress |
| 2021 | Beauty and the Boss | Sum Wai 沈慧 | |
| 2022 | ICAC Investigators 2022 | Yiu Man-ching 姚蔓晴 | |

=== Films ===
- Blue Moon (2001)
- Psychedelic Cop (2002)
- Bless the Child (2003)
- Fate Fighter (2003)
