= Miss Hong Kong 2017 =

Beauty pageant

- Date: 3 September 2017
- Presenters: Sammy Leung (森 美)、 Mayanne Mak (麥美恩)
- Venue: TVB City
- Broadcaster: TVB
- Winner: Juliette Louie
- Photogenic: Juliette Louie

Miss Hong Kong Pageant 2017 was held in TVB City on 3 September 2017. 12 delegates competed for this title.

== Results ==
=== Placements ===
Final results	Contestant	Notes
Miss Hong Kong 2017	#5 Juliette Louie (雷莊𠒇)	
1st runner-up	#1 Regina Ho (何依婷)	
2nd runner-up	#4 Emily Wong (黃瑋琦)	
Top 5	#8 Kelly Ng #10 Boanne Cheung	
Top 8	#3 Sandy Leung #6 Mandy Yau #9 Nicole Kam	

=== Special awards ===
- Miss Photogenic: Juliette Louie
- big big channel The Most Popular Contestant: Boanne Cheung

The following awards were given during sponsor or promotion event.

- Best Accessory Award: Boanne Cheung
- Sasa Beauty Award: Regina Ho
- Sasa The Most Popular Contestant: Kelly Ng
- Sasa Best KOL Award: Kelly Ng

The following big big channel special awards were given after the pageant in the programme "The 1st Failed Miss Hong Kong Pageant".

- big big channel The Most Tempting TVBody Award: Kelly Ng
- big big channel Miss Un-photogenic: Katarina Li
- big big channel Best Hair Award: Sandy Leung
- big big channel Failed Miss Hong Kong winner: Mandy Yau
- big big channel Best Foot Award: Suki Wong
- big big channel Miss Super Friendship: Nicole Kam

== Delegates ==
The Miss Hong Kong 2017 delegates were:

Top 10

No.	Contestant Name	Age	Height	Mentor	Note
1	Regina Ho 何依婷	23	5’3½”	Remus Choy	1st runner-up
2	Katarina Li 李清心	22	5’4”	Edmond So	
3	Sandy Leung 梁雯蔚	22	5’1½”	Jacqueline Wong	
4	Emily Wong 黃瑋琦	23	5’5”	Calvin Choy	2nd runner-up
5	Juliette Louie 雷莊𠒇	23	5’7”	Natalis Chan	Winner; Miss Photogenic
6	Mandy Yau 邱晴	17	5’7½”	Michael Miu	
7	Suki Wong 黃凱琪	24	5’10”	Vincent Wong	
8	Kelly Ng 伍樂怡	24	5’6”	Grace Chan	Top 5 Finalist
9	Nicole Kam 金美黎	23	5’7”	Carol Cheng	
10	Boanne Cheung 張寶欣	23	5’3½”	Carol Cheng	Sister of Bowie Cheung; Top 5 Finalist; big big channel The Most Popular Contestant

Top 12

Contestant Name	Age	Height	Note
Angela Lau 劉穎敏	22	5’5”	Eliminated on 31 July 2017
Nicole Wu 胡美貽	23	5’5½”	Eliminated on 14 August 2017

== Elimination chart ==
Contestants	Round 1 （Top 11） （31 Jul）	Round 2 （Top 10） （14 Aug）	Round 3 （Top 8） （3 Sep）	Round 4 （Top 5） （3 Sep）	Round 5 （Top 3） （3 Sep）
Juliette Louie	Advance	Advance	Advance	Advance	Champion
Regina Ho	Advance	Advance	Advance	Advance	1st runner-up
Emily Wong	Advance	Advance	Advance	Advance	2nd runner-up
Kelly Ng	Advance	Advance	Advance	Advance	Eliminated
Boanne Cheung	Advance	Advance	Advance	Reserved	Eliminated
Sandy Leung	Advance	Advance	Advance	Eliminated	
Mandy Yau	Advance	Advance	Advance	Eliminated	
Nicole Kam	Advance	Advance	Reserved	Eliminated	
Katarina Li	Advance	Advance	Eliminated		
Suki Wong	Advance	Advance	Eliminated		
Nicole Wu	Advance	Eliminated			
Angela Lau	Eliminated				

Elimination Date	Eliminated Contestant
31 July 2017	Angela Lau
14 August 2017	Nicole Wu

== Judges ==
- Main Judging Panel:
  - Carol Cheng Yu Ling (鄭裕玲)
  - Natalis Chan Pak Cheung (陳百祥)
  - Michael Miu Kiu Wai (苗僑偉)
  - Jessica Hester Hsuan (宣 萱)
  - Calvin Choy Yat-Chi @ Grasshopper (蔡一智 @草蜢)
  - Remus Choy Yat-Kit @ Grasshopper (蔡一傑 @草蜢)
  - Edmond So Chi-Wai @ Grasshopper (蘇志威 @草蜢)
  - Vincent Wong Ho Shun (王浩信)
  - Jacqueline Wong Sum-wing (黃心穎)
  - Grace Chan (陳凱琳)

== Post-Pageant Notes ==
- Juliette Louie placed 2nd runner-up in Miss Chinese International Pageant 2018 in Hong Kong.
- Juliette Louie placed 3rd runner-up in Miss Face Of Humanity 2022 in Toronto, Canada.
- Emily Wong unplaced in Miss World 2017 in Sanya, China.
- "The 1st Failed Miss Hong Kong Pageant" was held for the 6 delegates who failed to get any awards.
  - big big channel The Most Tempting TVBody Award: Kelly Ng
  - big big channel Miss Un-photogenic: Katarina Li
  - big big channel Best Hair Award: Sandy Leung
  - big big channel Failed Miss Hong Kong winner: Mandy Yau
  - big big channel Best Foot Award: Suki Wong
  - big big channel Miss Super Friendship: Nicole Kam
