= Stefan Wong =

Hong Kong actor (born 1978)

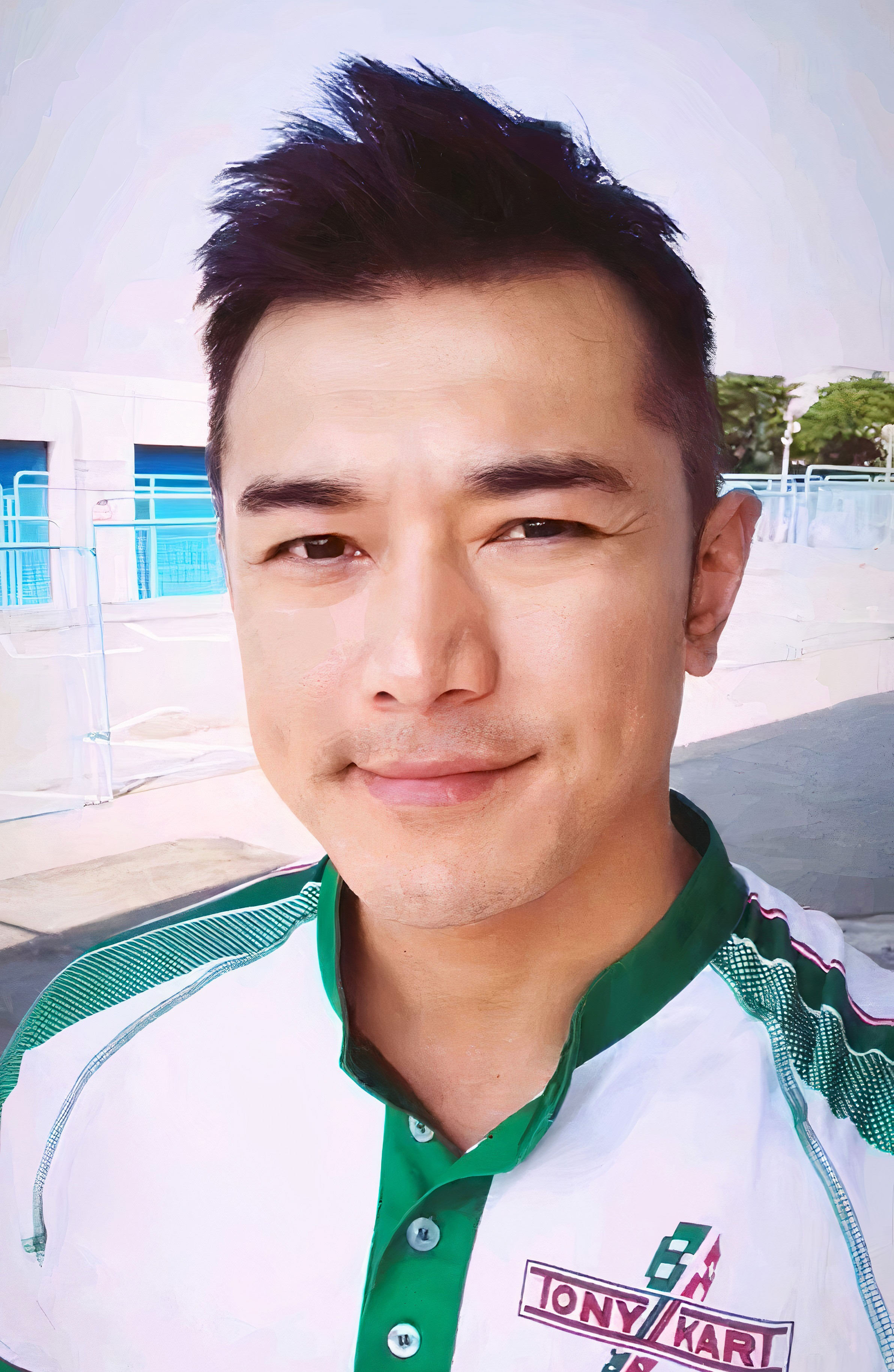
- Wong in September 2019
- Born: 22 September 1978 (age 47); Hong Kong
- Occupation: Actor
- Spouse: Peggy (m. 2012)

Chinese name
- Traditional Chinese: 黃祥興
- Simplified Chinese: 黄祥兴
Transcriptions
Standard Mandarin
- Hanyu Pinyin: Huáng Xiáng Xīng
Yue: Cantonese
- Jyutping: Wong4 Coeng4 Hing1

Stefan Wong (born 22 September 1978) is a former Mr. Hong Kong contestant, and is currently an actor with Hong Kong's TVB.

== Personal life ==
Wong was born in Hong Kong, but his family emigrated to France when he was five years old. Wong returned to Hong Kong after finishing his studies. His ancestors had migrated from China to Vietnam, and used the surname Huỳnh, the Vietnamese reading of the Chinese character pronounced Wong in Cantonese.

His brother, François Wong, also took part in Mr. Hong Kong, and became a TVB artiste before becoming an accountant. In 2011, Wong opened a French restaurant in Hong Kong.

Wong married his fiancé Peggy in France on 3 August 2012.

== Filmography ==
=== Television ===
Year	Title	Role
2007	Best Selling Secrets	Tommy
2007	Marriage of Inconvenience	Tin Long
2008	War of In-Laws II	Ching Chi-Sheung (Ryan)
2008	D.I.E.	Man Lung (Pierre)
2008	Forensic Heroes II	Ma Kwok-Wang (Ben)
2008	Speech of Silence	Cheung Jun (Herbert)
2009	D.I.E. Again	Man Lung (Pierre)
2009	The Stew of Life	Nam Tin Cheung (Daniel)
2009	ICAC Investigators 2009	Jason
2009–2010	The Beauty of the Game	Tong Wai-po
2010	The Mysteries of Love	Adrian
2010	When Lanes Merge	Andy
2010	Can't Buy Me Love	Luk Tung-chan
2010	Every Move You Make	Donald Lai
2010	Gun Metal Grey	Frankie Chiang
2011	7 Days in Life	Dr. Chow
2011	Only You	On Tsz-him (Angus)
2011	Ghetto Justice	Ching Pok-him (Victor)
2011	The Other Truth	Tony
2011	Forensic Heroes III	Wu Kai-yan (Alex)
2012	Let It Be Love	Lau Yin Wai
2012	The Greatness of a Hero	Mo Yin-ming
2012	Ghetto Justice II	Ching Pok Him (Victor)
2012	Every Move You Make	Donald
2012	Silver Spoon, Sterling Shackles	Lester Fok
2013	Friendly Fire	
2013	A Great Way to Care II	
2013	Awfully Lawful	Harry
2013	Triumph in the Skies II	Fergus
2014	Line Walker	James Pong Yin Ting
2015	Raising the Bar	Kelvin
2015	Smooth Talker	Wan Siu-lung
2015	Angel In-the-Making	young Lung Yau-san
2018	Daddy Cool	Paul
2018	Stealing Seconds	Honest
2018	Who Wants a Baby?	Frankie
2019	Our Unwinding Ethos	Pierre
2020	On-Lie Game	Michael

=== Film ===
Year	Title	Role
2009	Red Nights	Patrick
2010	Fire of Conscience	Chan Hong
2011	I Love Hong Kong	
2016	Line Walker	
2018	Master Z: The Ip Man Legacy	
2019	P Storm	
2019	Line Walker 2	
2019	Breakout Brothers	
