= Man in Charge =

- Official poster
- 幕後大老爺
- Genre: Costume drama
- Written by: Sit Kar Wah; Lam Siu Chi; Fung Yat Jun; Chan Chi Keung
- Directed by: Sai Yin Fong; Chan Seung Kuen; Ng Koon Jing; Fong Jun Chiu
- Starring: Kenneth Ma; Kate Tsui; Matthew Ko; Leila Tong
- Opening theme: "幕後人" by Kenneth Ma & Matthew Ko
- Country of origin: Hong Kong
- Original language: Cantonese
- No. of episodes: 20

Production
- Producer: Lee Tim-shing
- Running time: 45 minutes (each)

Original release
- Network: TVB
- Release: April 6 – May 1, 2009

Man in Charge (Traditional Chinese: 幕後大老爺) is a twenty-episode 2009 TVB television drama.

== Synopsis ==
Set during the Qing Dynasty of China in the mid 18th century, Man in Charge tells the story of an official adviser, Chau Bing (Kenneth Ma), and his relationship with the young county official, Shum Kwan-Pok (Matthew Ko). Bing obtains a secure job as Kwan-Pok's private adviser and the two become good friends. They both try to root out Manchu government corruptions.

Chau Bing was brought up by his mentor, who teaches him how to be an adviser, as he was an orphan that his parents died when he was young. Chau Bing's parents had plans to kill the emperor Yong Zheng but failed to do so as it was found out and was killed. In order to investigate the case, Yong Zheng set up a group. One of the spy is Chau Bing's wife Chiu Yuk Hing. Chiu Yuk Hing is good in Kung Fu and was given the mission to marry Chau Bing to find out who was the mastermind of the whole plan. However, no news could be found out of Chau Bing as he did not know anything about it. Chiu Yok Hing was told to kill Chau Bing to close up the case as the group was to be dismissed but she did not as she gradually fell in love with Chau Bing.

However, Shum Kwan-Pok totally changed to a villain, he in directly made his biological father commit suicide in the prison, and tries to kill Chau Bing to keep his secret as Chau Bing got to know that his mentor Dai Lou See is actually Shum Kwan-Pok's biological father but gave him away to Shum Lou Ye as that time there was a scholar who wrote something which offended the king, Yong Zheng, and was killed, and since then the tests for scholars in order to be a county official is diminished. Dai Lou See wants to see his son being a county official, so he gave his son to Shum Lou Ye.

Chiu Yuk Hing was killed while saving Chau Bing when Shum Kwan Pok hired assassin to kill him.

== Cast ==
Cast	Role	Description
Kenneth Ma	Chau Bing 周炳	Lawyer; Chiu Yuk Hing's husband.
Kate Tsui	Chiu Yuk-Hing 趙玉卿	Chau Bing's wife. Former assassin. Dies in Episode 18
Leila Tong	Chong Siu-Han 莊小嫻	Restaurant Owner; Chau Bing's dream woman.
Matthew Ko	Shum Kwan-Bok 沈君博	Judge

== Awards and nominations ==
TVB Anniversary Awards (2009)

- Best Drama
- My Favourite Male Character (Kenneth Ma)

== Viewership ratings ==
	Week	Episodes	Average Points	Peaking Points	References
1	April 6–10, 2009	1 — 5	25	—	
2	April 13–17, 2009	6 — 10	28	—	
3	April 20–24, 2009	11 — 15	28	—	
4	April 27 - May 1, 2009	16 — 20	29	32	
