= Kate Tsui =

Hong Kong actress and model

- 徐子珊
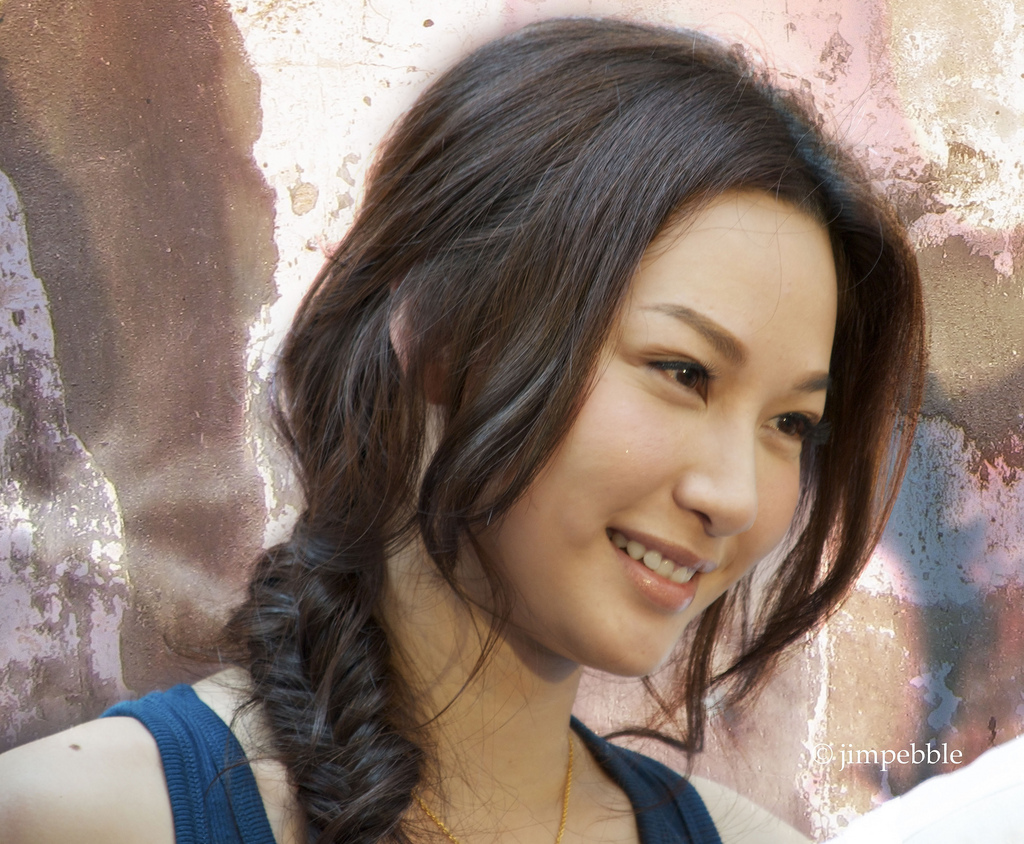
- Tsui in 2011
- Born: 19 June 1979 (age 47); British Hong Kong
- Education: University of California, Davis; University of Hong Kong
- Occupations: Actress; singer; jewelry designer
- Known for: Miss Hong Kong 2004
- Awards: Hong Kong SME Awards – Most Promising New Entrepreneur (katetsui.com) –2016; JSG Music Awards – Top Hits Award– 2015; Hong Kong Film Awards|Best New Performer –2008 Eye in the Sky; TVB Anniversary Awards – My Favourite Female Character –2012 Highs and Lows; IFPI Hong Kong Top Record Sale Awards – Top Selling Female Newcomer Award –2010; Hong Kong Film Director's Guild – Best Newcomer Award–2008; Most Improved Female Artiste –2007 On the First Beat; Steps
- Website: katetsui.com

Kate Tsui Tsz-shan is a former Hong Kong actress, known for her work with Television Broadcasts Limited (TVB). She was crowned Miss Hong Kong in 2004. In December 2019, she announced her retirement from the entertainment industry, expressing plans to move to Europe and pursue further education.

== Early life ==
Tsui was born and raised in Hong Kong.

Before winning her beauty pageant title, she aspired to become a professional dancer. She began studying ballet at the age of four, but was forced to stop at the age of eleven after sustaining an ankle injury. At fourteen, she took up Jazz dance, salsa, and Argentine tango.

Tsui graduated from the University of California, Davis with a degree in psychology. After completing her studies in the United States, she returned to Hong Kong and worked as a translator and project coordinator at an engineering firm.

In 2004, she entered the Miss Hong Kong pageant and won, also receiving the titles of Miss Photogenic, Miss International Goodwill, and the Slimming Beauty Award. Following the competition, she signed with TVB and began her acting career.

== TV career ==
After guest appearances in The Zone and When Rules Turn Loose in 2005, Tsui made her official TV debut in the TVB drama La Femme Desperado (2006). Taiwanese film critic Mai Ruoyu remarked that Tsui displayed strong charisma and held her own in the series alongside veteran actresses Sheren Tang and Melissa Ng. Her portrayal of Ida earned nominations for Best Supporting Actress and Favorite Female Character at the 2006 TVB Anniversary Awards.

In 2007, Tsui appeared in The Brink of Law, On the First Beat, and Steps. These roles earned her the Most Improved Female Artist award at the TVB Anniversary Awards 2007. Her performance in Steps also brought her Best Actress and Favourite Female Character nominations.

In 2008, she played her first villain role in Moonlight Resonance, placing her in the top five for Best Supporting Actress at the TVB Anniversary Awards. Her leading role as a deaf character in Speech of Silence placed her in the top ten for Best Actress that same year.

From 2009 to 2010, Tsui focused on film work, returning to television in 2011 with six dramas. Her role as Paris Yiu in Lives of Omission received significant attention, winning her the My Favourite TVB Female TV Character award at the StarHub TVB Awards, as well as nominations for Best Actress and Favourite Female Character at the 2011 TVB Anniversary Awards and Outstanding Actress in Television at the Ming Pao Anniversary Award.

In 2011, amid a high turnover of contracted TVB artists, executive Virginia Lok named Tsui, Myolie Wu, Linda Chung, and Fala Chen, as the new “Top Four Fa Dans” (a Cantonese term for leading actresses with high popularity), succeeding Flora Chan, Ada Choi, Kenix Kwok, and Jessica Hsuan.

In Highs and Lows (2012), Tsui portrayed a character facing substance abuse, sexual assault, and eventual involvement in drug trafficking. She described filming the role as emotionally draining. Producer Lam Chi Wah called it the greatest breakthrough in her career, noting her departure from the beauty pageant image to take on a complex role. [6] Director Patrick Kong also praised the maturity of her acting in emotional scenes.

In 2014, Tsui appeared in the TVB microfilm A Time of Love, starring in the “sorrow” segment opposite Taiwanese actors James Wen and Chris Wang. TVB reported receiving 39 viewer statements commending her performance, and columnist Ko Leung of Macao Daily likened her acting to Bai Baihe in The Stolen Years.

Her management contract with TVB ended in 2015. Tsui maintained a good relationship with the broadcaster, which arranged jobs for her until early February 2016. She stated she would not sign a new management contract until completing her jewelry design courses.

== Film career ==
Tsui debuted in film in 2007 as the female lead in Eye in the Sky, produced by Johnnie To and directed by Yau Nai-hoi., alongside Tony Leung Ka-fai and Simon Yam. Her performance earned her the Best Newcomer – Gold Award from the Hong Kong Film Directors' Guild and Best New Performer at the 27th Hong Kong Film Awards (2008).

In 2009, she starred in I Corrupt All Cops, a Hong Kong crime drama, directed by Wong Jing, who was impressed with the success of her debut performance in Eye in the Sky. Eason Chan, who plays her husband in the film, said Tsui's character is based on Shuang'er from The Deer and the Cauldron.

In 2010, she starred in the Wuxia film 14 Blades, alongside Donnie Yen, Zhao Wei, and Wu Chun.

In 2011, Tsui reprised her role as Paris Yiu Ho from the TVB series Lives of Omission in its film sequel, Turning Point 2, in which she starred opposite Francis Ng. Playing a character with a mental disorder in the film, she said while collaborating with Ng, was a valuable experience because he was extremely willing to teach and give her suggestions about her acting and performances. From working with Tsui, Ng had openly praised her for her acting potential.

In 2013, she took part in a comedy film, I Love Hong Kong 2013. It is also the first film that veteran actress, Veronica Yip, has taken part in since her retirement in 1996. In the film, Tsui plays the younger version of Yip's character. The producer of the film, Eric Tsang, specifically praised her for providing the best performance out of the entire cast, referring to it as a "Best Actress performance". In the same year, Tsui was also cast in Giddens Ko film, A Choo, alongside Ariel Lin and Kai Ko.

In 2015, Tsui was cast in the thriller film, Knock Knock, Who's There? The film is the first directorial effort by veteran actress, Carrie Ng. She said she had intended to reject the role upon receiving the script because of the frightening content. However, she eventually agreed to the role due to Francis Ng's persistence and persuasion. With reference to collaborating with Tsui, Ng said that she is a very professional and admirable actress.

== Jewelry design career ==
In December 2015, Tsui launched a fine jewelry line with K.S. Sze & Sons Ltd. Her debut collection, "Rabbit-Duck Illusion", was a success. She indicated that her designs were inspired by Ludwig Wittgenstein's concept on seeing with different perceptions, using the ambiguous image of a "duckrabbit". She spoke of the concept behind her jewelry designs, "It's something that I like to remind myself of, that there are many situations in life that aren't worth splitting hairs over, and if I simply adjust the angle that I'm viewing things from, I can easily see a different perspective."

== Filmography ==
=== Films ===
Year	Title	Role	Notes
2007	Eye in the Sky	Ho Ka-po (Piggy)	Hong Kong Film Award for Best New Performer
2007	Contract Lover	Rachel	
2008	Lady Cop & Papa Crook	Fiona Chan	
2009	I Corrupt All Cops	May	
2009	Short of Love	Scar Sandy	
2009	The Super Snail Adventure	Pretty Goat	Animated Film; Voice Role (Cantonese)
2009	Bodyguards and Assassins	Fang Hong	Character portrayed by Li Yuchun; Voice Role (Cantonese)
2009	Avatar	Neytiri	Character portrayed by Zoe Saldaña; Voice Role (Cantonese)
2010	14 Blades	Tuo Tuo	
2010	72 Tenants of Prosperity	Bobo	Cameo
2010	Perfect Wedding	Remmy	Cameo
2010	Just Another Pandora's Box	Nurse	Character portrayed by Xu Wanqiu; Voice Role (Cantonese)
2011	I Love Hong Kong	Young Twin	Cameo
2011	Turning Point 2	Yiu Ho-ho (Paris)	
2011	Moon Castle: The Space Adventure	Lazy Goat	Animated Film; Voice Role (Cantonese)
2012	Mission Incredible: Adventures on the Dragon's Trail	Pretty Goat	Animated Film; Voice Role (Cantonese)
2013	I Love Hong Kong 2013	Mei Yeung-yeung	
2013	Baby Blues	Ying Nam	
2015	Knock Knock, Who's There?	Sau Yung	
2016	Buddy Cops	Little Princess	

=== Television ===
Year	Title	Role	Notes
2005	The Zone	Joanna	Cameo; Episode 8
2005	When Rules Turn Loose	Ada Siu Mei-Wah	Cameo
2006	La Femme Desperado	Ida Hoi Suen	Nominated — TVB Anniversary Award for Best Supporting Actress (Top 20); Nominated — TVB Anniversary Award for My Favourite Female Character (Top 20)
2007	The Brink of Law	Yan Heung-Ching	
2007	On the First Beat	Man Ching	Won — TVB Anniversary Award for Most Improved Female Artist
2007	Steps	Victoria Yeung Sze-Man	Won — TVB Anniversary Award for Most Improved Female Artist; Nominated — TVB Anniversary Award for Best Actress (Top 20); Nominated — TVB Anniversary Award for My Favourite Female Character (Top 20)
2008	The Price of Greed	Lam Ping	Previously warehoused; released overseas December 2006
2008	Speech of Silence	Tong Tong	Nominated — TVB Anniversary Award for Best Actress (Top 10)
2008	Moonlight Resonance	Camie Lo Ka-Mei	Nominated — TVB Anniversary Award for Best Supporting Actress (Top 5)
2008	The Four	Song Zhi-Yan	
2009	Man in Charge	Chiu Yuk-Hing	
2009–10	The Beauty of the Game	Ko Ching-man	Nominated — TVB Anniversary Award for Best Actress (Top 15)
2010	Don Juan DeMercado	Tse On Fei	
2010	When Lanes Merge	Ko Lai-sum	Won — StarHub TVB Awards 2011 — My Favourite Female TV Character
2011	A Great Way to Care	Mandy Mok Man Yee (Monkey)	Previously warehoused; released overseas June 2009
2011	Dropping By Cloud Nine	June	Guest appearance
2011	Relic of an Emissary	Shum Chin-sam / Chor-chor	
2011	Wax and Wane	Peace Man Ka-fu	
2011	Lives of Omission	Paris Yiu Ho-ho	Won — StarHub TVB Awards 2012 — My Favourite Female TV Character; Nominated — TVB Anniversary Award for Best Actress (Top 15); Nominated — TVB Anniversary Award for My Favourite Female Character (Top 15); Nominated — Ming Pao Anniversary Award for Outstanding Actress in Television
2011	Forensic Heroes III	Ada Ling Sin-yee	Won — My AOD Awards for My Top 15 Favourite Characters
2012	Gloves Come Off	Cheuk Man	Guest appearance Episode 2
2012	Highs and Lows	Pat Chan Ka-Bik	Won — TVB Anniversary Award for My Favourite Female Character; Won — My AOD Awards for My Top 15 Favourite Characters; Nominated — TVB Anniversary Award for Best Actress (Top 5); Nominated — My AOD Awards for My Favourite Actress in a Leading Role; Nominated — My AOD Awards for My Favourite On-Screen Couple (Raymond Lam & Kate Tsui)
2013	Season of Love	Summer Ha Chi-yan	Episodes 6–10
2013	A Great Way to Care II	Mandy Mok Man-yee	Guest appearance Episode 1
2013	Sniper Standoff	Sheung Koon Ming Chu	Nominated — TVB Star Awards Malaysia 2013 for My Favourite TVB Actress in a Leading Role; Nominated — TVB Star Awards Malaysia 2013 for My Favourite TVB Drama Character
2013	Bounty Lady	Jennifer Sing Fa-lui	Nominated — TVB Anniversary Award for Best Actress 2013 (Top 5); Nominated — TVB Anniversary Award for My Favourite Female Character (Top 5) Nominated — TVB Star Awards Malaysia 2014 for My Favourite TVB On-Screen Couple (Dayo Wong & Kate Tsui) (Top 3); Won — StarHub TVB Awards 2014 for My Top 6 Favourite TVB Female TV Character
2014	A Time of Love	Ah San/Kelly	TVB-Produced Micro Film; Episode 01
2014	The Ultimate Addiction	Gia Chi Nga	Nominated — StarHub TVB Awards 2014 for My Favourite TVB Actress; Nominated — StarHub TVB Awards 2014 for My Favourite TVB Female TV Character Nominated — StarHub TVB Awards 2014 for My Favourite TVB On-Screen Couple (Bosco Wong & Kate Tsui) (Top 5)
2014	Tomorrow Is Another Day	Yiu Ngoi-ka	Nominated — TVB Anniversary Award for Best Actress 2014 (Top 5); Nominated — TVB Star Awards Malaysia 2014 for My Favourite TVB Actress in a Leading Role (Top 5); Won — TVB Star Awards Malaysia 2014 for My Top 15 Favourite TVB Drama Characters
2015	Smooth Talker	Mo Sui-yee	Nominated — StarHub TVB Awards 2015 for My Favourite TVB Actress; Nominated — StarHub TVB Awards 2015 for My Favourite TVB Female TV Character; Nominated — TVB Star Awards Malaysia 2015 for My Favourite TVB Actress in a Leading Role; Nominated — TVB Star Awards Malaysia 2015 for My Top 15 Favourite TVB Drama Characters; Nominated — TVB Anniversary Awards for Best Actress 2015
2018	Guardian Angel	Yip Chi	Introduced in Episode 03

== Awards ==
2016

- The most promising new entrepreneur of the year - katetsui.com

2015

- Jade Solid Gold Music Awards Presentation 2014 – Song Award: 棋逢敵手 (with Hubert Wu)

2014

- StarHub TVB Awards 2014 – My Top 6 Favourite Female TV Character Award (Bounty Lady)
- StarHub TVB Awards 2014 – Everlasting Glow Award
- Jade Solid Gold Second Round Music Awards 2014 – Song Award: 棋逢敵手 (with Hubert Wu)

2013

- StarHub TVB Awards 2013– My Top 6 Favourite Female TV Character Award (Highs and Lows)
- StarHub TVB Awards 2013 – Most Glamorous Female Artist Award
- Next TV Awards 2013 – Top 10 Artist (No. 10)

2012

- TVB 45th Anniversary Awards 2012 – My Favourite Female Character Award (Highs and Lows)
- StarHub TVB Awards 2012 – My Top 6 Favourite Female TV Character Award (Lives of Omission)
- StarHub TVB Awards 2012 – Star of Perfect Poise Award
- My AOD Awards 2012 – My Top 15 Favourite Characters Award (Highs and Lows)

2011

- StarHub TVB Awards 2011 – My Favourite Female TV Character (When Lanes Merge)
- StarHub TVB Awards 2011 – Most Energetic Award
- My AOD Awards 2011 – My Top 15 Favourite Characters Award (Forensic Heroes III)

2010

- 2009 Ultimate Song Chart Awards (903) – Female Newcomer – Silver
- 2009 Jade Solid Gold Best Ten Music Awards Presentation – Best Newcomer Artist – Gold
- 2009 RTHK Top 10 Gold Songs Awards – Best Prospective Newcomer Award – Gold
- Sina Music Awards 2009 – My Favourite Female Newcomer 2009 – Bronze
- Sprite Music Award (雪碧榜) Ceremony 2009 – Most Outstanding Newcomer Award (Hong Kong Region)
- IFPI Hong Kong CD Sales Presentation 2009 – Top Selling Hong Kong Female Newcomer

2009

- Jade Solid Gold First Round Music Awards 2009 – Newcomer Impact Award
- JSG Third Round Music Awards 2009 – Song Award: Hit Me
- Metro Radio Hits Music Award Presentation 2009 – Metro Radio Hits King of New Singers Award 2009 (Female)

2008

- 27th Hong Kong Film Awards – Best New Performer Award

2007

- TVB 40th Anniversary Awards 2007 – Most Improved Female Artist Award
- Hong Kong Film Directors' Guild 2007 – Best Newcomer – Gold Award

2005

- Miss Chinese International 2005 – Miss Gorgeous

2004

- Miss Hong Kong 2004 – Winner
- Miss Hong Kong 2004 – Miss Photogenic
- Miss Hong Kong 2004 – Miss International Goodwill
- Miss Hong Kong 2004 – Slimming Beauty Award

== Discography ==
=== Albums ===
Year	Title	Notes	Details
2009	Kiss Me Kate	EP album	Release date: 10 September 2009; 1. 讀心術; 2. Hit Me; 3. 惡作劇; 4. 血拼; 5. 讀心術 remix (Master Mind Mix); 6. 讀心術 remix (Carnival Mix)

=== Singles ===
Year	Title	Notes
2009	"Les Misérables"	Les Misérables theme song
2009	"Cheer Up"	sang with other artistes
2011	"I will Wait for You" (我等你)	Subtheme of Relic of an Emissary; Duet with Michael Tse
2011	"Half Circle" (半圓)	Subtheme of Wax and Wane
2014	"I've met my match" (棋逢敵手)	Subtheme of The Ultimate Addiction; Duet with Hubert Wu

Awards and achievements
Miss Hong Kong
Preceded by Mandy Cho	Miss Hong Kong; 2004	Succeeded by Tracy Ip
Preceded by Selena Li	Miss Photogenic; 2004	Succeeded by Shermon Tang
TVB Anniversary Awards
Preceded by Linda Chung for Always Ready; The Bitter Bitten; Forensic Heroes	Most Improved Actress; 2007 for On the First Beat; Steps	Succeeded by Nancy Wu for Wars of In-Laws II; D.I.E.; Legend of the Demigods; The Silver Chamber of Sorrows; Strictly Come Dancing II
Preceded by Myolie Wu for Ghetto Justice	My Favourite Female Character; 2012 for Highs and Lows	Succeeded by Kristal Tin for Brother's Keeper
Hong Kong Film Awards
Preceded by Gouw Ian Iskandar for After This Our Exile	Best New Performer; 2008 for Eye in the Sky	Succeeded by Xu Jiao for CJ7
Metro Radio Hit Music Awards
Preceded by Linda Chung	Best New Female Artist; 2009	Succeeded by JW
Commercial Radio Song Awards
Preceded by Myolie Wu	Best Female Newcomer (Silver); 2009	Succeeded by Sugar Club (Best Newcomer, Silver)
Jade Solid Gold Best Ten Music Awards Presentation
Preceded by William Chan (male); G.E.M. (female)	Best Popular New Artist; 2009	Succeeded by JW
RTHK Top 10 Gold Songs Awards
Preceded by William Chan	Best Prospect Award (Gold); 2009	Succeeded by Sugar Club
