= Speech of Silence =

- Poster
- 甜言蜜語
- Genre: Modern Drama
- Written by: Ng Shiu Tung; Tsui Tze Shan
- Starring: Kate Tsui; Kenneth Ma; Lai Lok-yi; Claire Yiu; Elaine Yiu
- Opening theme: "直覺" by Joyce Cheng
- Country of origin: Hong Kong
- Original language: Cantonese
- No. of episodes: 20

Production
- Producer: Tsui Yue On
- Running time: 45 minutes (approx.)

Original release
- Network: TVB
- Release: June 23 – July 21, 2008

Speech of Silence (Traditional Chinese: 甜言蜜語) is a TVB modern drama series broadcast in June 2008.

== Synopsis ==
Taste the bittersweet, breathe the love...
Read my mind between silence and sound

Tong Tong (Kate Tsui) lost part of her hearing in an explosion at a young age while trying to save her foster father and siblings. Since the traumatic event, she uses a hearing aid to assist her. She is well liked by others and has an extremely positive attitude towards life despite her minor disability. With the support of her mentor Ko Ming (Yu Yang), Tong becomes a voice-over talent by utilizing her lip-reading ability.

At the production studio, she meets another voice talent Leung Kai-Yin (Kenneth Ma), who is also interested in the industry. Tong soon falls for Leung but is too shy to confess her love to him. Meanwhile, a colleague Yuen Siu Na (Claire Yiu) falls for Yin as well. Yin, however, is more fond of Tong, and they fall in love soon after and begin a relationship.

Unfortunately, on one occasion, Tong's sister Chai Ka-Yee (Elaine Yiu) had everyone believe she was about to commit suicide after failing in a relationship. While trying to console her, Tong falls and hits her head, causing her to lose her hearing completely. After the trauma, Tong lost all her confidence and shunned everyone else, including Yin. Yin tries his best to encourage Tong to regain her confidence and happiness in her life.

== Cast ==
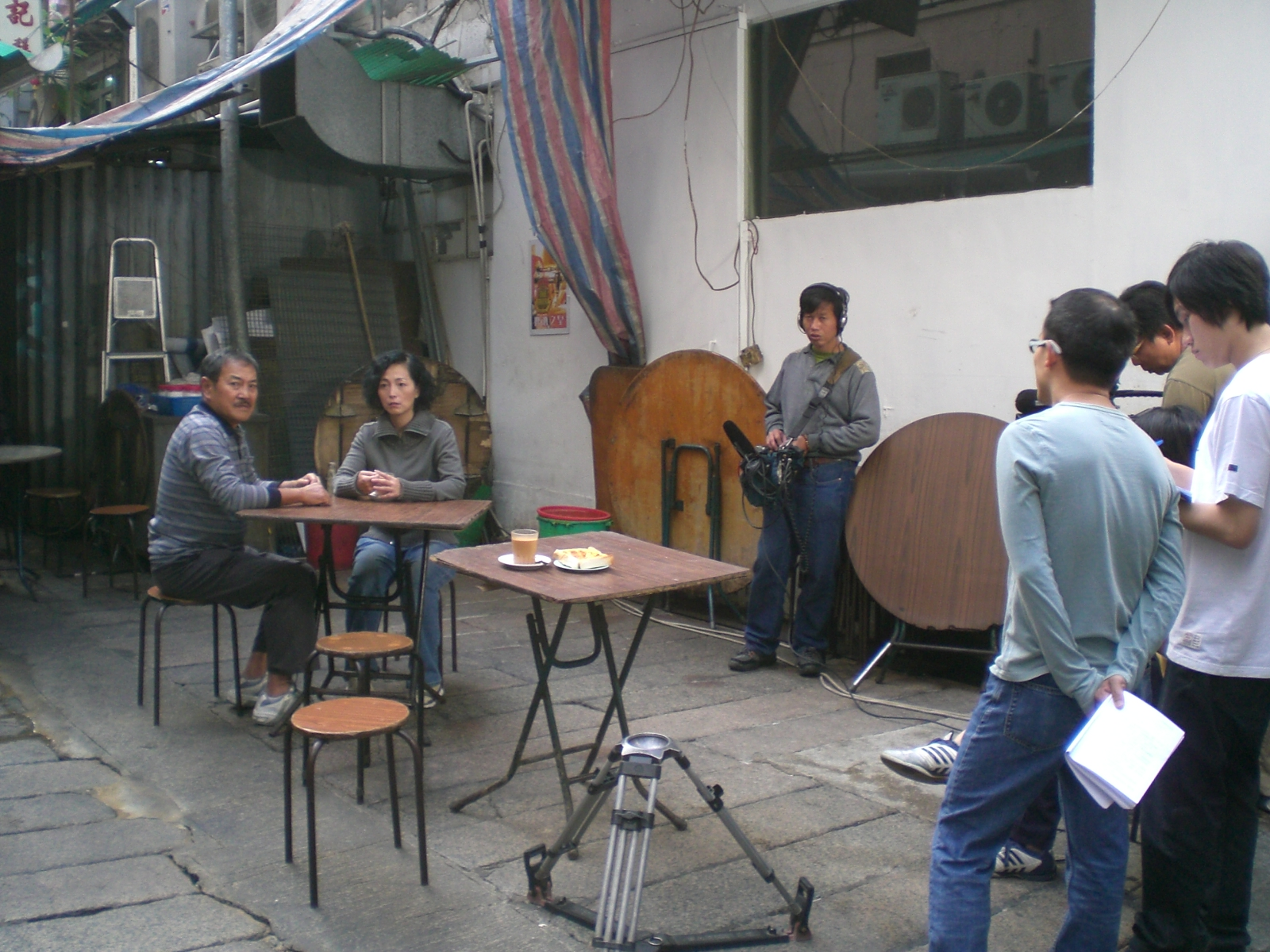
Lau Dan and Kingdom Yuen filming on location.

Cast	Role	Description
Kenneth Ma	Leung Kai-Yin (OK Boy) 梁啟言	Tong Tong's lover. Leung Kam-Bor's son.
Kate Tsui	Tong Tong 唐棠	Partially deaf. Leung Kai-Yin's lover.
Kingdom Yuen (苑瓊丹)	Leung Lai-Yue 梁麗茹	Leung Kai-Yin's aunt. Leung Kam-Bor's sister.
Lau Dan	Leung Kam-Bor 梁錦波	Leung Kai-Yin's father. Leung Lai-Yue's brother.
Claire Yiu	Yuen Siu-Na 袁少娜	
Elaine Yiu	Chai Ka-Yi (Kary) 齊家怡	Tong Tong's step sister. Chiu Man Kei's good friend turned love rival, befriend again Cheung Yau Lover
Lai Lok-yi	Cheung Yau 張友	Leung Kai-Yin's best friend. Chai Ka-Yee Lover
Stephen Huynh	Cheung Jun (Herbert) 張俊	Leung Kai-Yin's uncle Chiu Man Kei's ex-boyfriend Chai Ka-Yee's lover
Queenie Chu	Chiu Man Kei (Kiki) 趙汶琪	"QQ Girl Noodle" champion Former shop sales lady Cheung Jun's ex-girlfriend Chai Ka-Yee's good friend turned love rival, befriended again
Stephen Wong	Chai Ka-On 齊家安	Tong Tong's stepbrother.
Mok Hoi-him		Yuen Siu-Na's son

== Viewership ratings ==
	Week	Episode	Average Points	Peaking Points	References
1	June 23–27, 2008	1 — 5	29	33	
2	June 30 - July 4, 2008	6 — 10	27	31	
3	July 7–11, 2008	11 — 15	29	—	
4	July 14–18, 2008	16 — 20	30	—	

== Awards and nominations ==
41st TVB Anniversary Awards (2008)

- "Best Drama"
- "Best Actress in a Leading Role" (Kate Tsui - Tong Tong)
- "Best Actress in a Supporting Role" (Claire Yiu - Yuen Siu-Na)
