= Super Trio series =

Hong Kong television series

- Poster of Super Trio Game Master, the ninth season
- Genre: Variety show, Game show
- Created by: TVB
- Opening theme: Various
- Country of origin: Hong Kong
- Original language: Cantonese
- No. of series: 11

Production
- Running time: 1 hour (including advertisements)

Original release
- Network: TVB
- Release: 20 December 1995 – 12 May 2024

Super Trio series
- Traditional Chinese: 獎門人系列
- Literal meaning: The Prize Master Series
Transcriptions
Yue: Cantonese
- Jyutping: zoeng2 mun4 jan4 hai6 lit6

The Super Trio Series is a Hong Kong variety show series produced by TVB. It debuted in 1995, and remained in production for eighteen years due to its popularity. The show was hosted by Eric Tsang and his two assistants - Jerry Lamb and Chin Kar-lok.

The show initially ended its run with the airing of the final episode on 16 July 2005. However, on 9 March 2008, the first episode of the show's spin-off series Super Trio Wonder Trip was aired; its main purpose was to introduce a series of new games that are to be imported from various game shows all over the world and would appear in series 8, Super Trio Supreme. On 26 May 2013, the tenth series, Super Trio Maximus, was aired, its final episode airing on 12 January 2014.

Eight years later, in 2022, the show was revived with the new series, Super Trio Returns. Eric Tsang, Chin Ka-Lok, Louis Yuen from series 8 and Mayanne Mak from I Heart HK hosted the program as prizemaster and prize elders respectively. Additionally, Hellston Ching and Amisha Ng joined the program as new prize elders.

== Format ==
The show is presented by Eric Tsang, the "Prize Master" (獎門人; zoeng2 mun4 jan4) and the "prize elders" (獎老; zoeng2 lo2), Jerry Lamb and Chin Ka-lok. Each episode features several popular Hong Kong celebrities as guest stars. Sometimes contestants from Miss Hong Kong pageants and other international pageants are invited. They participate in different party games devised by the producers, usually ridiculous or sexually provocative. At the end of each round, attractive (or sometimes bizarre) prizes would be awarded to the winners. Audiences are often included as part of the show.

== Series titles ==
Over the course of its run, the series uses different names to identify its different shows.

Series	Chinese name	Official English title	Direct translation	Year
Series 1	超級無敵獎門人©MCMXCV	Movie Buff Championship	The Super Invincible Prize Master	1995-1996
Series 2	超級無敵獎門人之再戰江湖©MCMXCVII	Movie Buff Championship (Sr.2)	The Super Invincible Prize Master Returns for Battle	1997
Series 3	天下無敵獎門人©MCMXCVIII	The Super Trio Show	The Unbeatable Prize Master	1998-1999
Series 4	驚天動地獎門人©MCMXCIX	The Super Trio Mega Show	The Shocking Prize Master	1999
Series 5	宇宙無敵獎門人©MM	The Super Trio Show (Sr.2)	The Universally Invincible Prize Master	2000-2001
Series 6	吾係獎門人©MMII	A Trio Delights	I am The Prize Master	2002
Series 7	繼續無敵獎門人©MMIV	The Super Trio Continues	The Continually Invincible Prize Master	2004-2005
Post-Series 7	繼續無敵獎門人不敗之謎©MMV	The Super Trio - Total Recall	The Secrets of the Unbeaten Prize Master	2005
Pre-Series 8	獎門人取犀GAME©MMVIII	Super Trio Wonder Trip	The Prize Master's Quest to Obtain Great Games	2008
Series 8	鐵甲無敵獎門人MMVIII©	Super Trio Supreme	The Armored Invincible Prize Master	2008-2009
Pre-Series 9	超級遊戲獎門人大爆發©MMX	Super Trio Game Master Pre-show	The Super Games Prize Master Explosion	2010
Series 9	超級遊戲獎門人©MMX	Super Trio Game Master	The Super Games Prize Master	2010
Series 10	超級無敵獎門人終極篇©MMXIII	Super Trio Maximus	The Super Invincible Prize Master the Finale	2013-2014
Series 11	開心無敵獎門人@MMXXII	Super Trio Returns	Happy Invincible Prize Master	2022

== Series 1: Movie Buff Championship ==
Airdates: 20 December 1995 – 17 July 1996

Timeslots: Wednesday evenings

Hosts: Eric Tsang, Chin Kar-lok, Jerry Lamb, Jordan Chan (later in the series replacing Jordan Chan - EPS.21)

Episodes: 31

Episode	Guests	Winner(s)
1	Christy Chung (鍾麗緹), Simon Yam (任達華), Anita Lee (李婉華), Alfred Cheung (張堅庭), Chen Hai-Qi (陳海琪), Michael Chow (周文健) - Highest Points: Anita Lee (李婉華)	Simon Yam (任達華)
2	Jessica Hsuan (宣萱), Anita Yuen (袁詠儀), Sean Lau (劉青雲), Shing Fui-on (成奎安), Ada Choi (蔡少芬), Remus Choy (蔡一傑) - Highest Points: Jessica Hsuan (宣萱)	Sean Lau (劉青雲)
3	Veronica Yip (葉玉卿), Hacken Lee (李克勤), Sheila Chan (陳淑蘭), Anthony Lun (倫永亮), Baak Wan-Kam (白韻琴), Francis Ng (吳鎮宇) - Highest Points: Francis Ng (吳鎮宇)	Hacken Lee (李克勤)
4	Aaron Kwok (郭富城), Cass Phang (彭羚), Harlem Yu (庚澄慶), Amanda Lee (李蕙敏), Alex To (杜德偉), Amy Kwok (郭藹明) - Highest Points: Alex To (杜德偉)	Aaron Kwok (郭富城)
5	Waise Lee (李子雄), Irene Wan (溫碧霞), Andy Hui (許志安), Vivian Chow (周慧敏), Wong Kwong-Leung (黃光亮), Christine Ng (伍詠薇) - Highest Points: Vivian Chow (周慧敏)	Christine Ng (伍詠薇)
6	Natalis Chan (陳百祥), Michael Wong (王敏德), Alan Tam (譚詠麟), Josie Ho (何超儀), Jacky Cheung (張學友), Carol Cheng (鄭裕玲) - Highest Points: Alan Tam (譚詠麟)	Alan Tam (譚詠麟)
7	Halina Tam (譚小環), Michael Miu (苗僑偉), Paulyn Sun (孫佳君), Chin Kar-lok (錢嘉樂), Cutie Mui (梅小惠), David Lui (呂方) - Highest Points: Halina Tam (譚小環)	Halina Tam (譚小環)
8	Andy Lau (劉德華), Margie Tsang Wah Sin (曾華倩), Bobby Au-Yeung (歐陽震華), Joyce Koi (蓋鳴暉), Michael Tao (陶大宇), Joey Leung (梁榮忠) - Highest Points: Andy Lau (劉德華)	Margie Tsang (曾華倩)
9	Francis Ng (吳鎮宇), Anita Lee (李婉華), Wyman Wong (黃偉文), Laan-sai (蘭茜), Law Ka-Ying (羅家英), Cutie Mui (梅小惠), Shing Fui-on (成奎安), Kingdom Yuen (苑瓊丹), Alan Tam (譚詠麟), Vivian Chow (周慧敏), Ray Lui (呂良偉), Cally Kwong (鄺美雲) Highest Points: Shing Fui-on (成奎安), Kingdom Yuen (苑瓊丹)	Shing Fui-on (成奎安), Kingdom Yuen (苑瓊丹)
10	Carrie Ng (吳家麗), Eric Moo (巫啟賢), Edmond So (蘇志威), Monica Chan (陳法蓉), Clifton Ko (高志森), Liza Wang (汪明荃) - Highest Points: Liza Wang (汪明荃)	Liza Wang (汪明荃)
11	Jade Leung (梁琤), Lam Ka-Tung (林家棟), Carman Lee (李若彤), Simon Lui (雷宇揚), Linda Wong (王馨平), Deric Wan (溫兆倫) - Highest Points: Linda Wong (王馨平)	Linda Wong (王馨平)
12	Sunny Chan (陳錦鴻), Jay Lau (劉錦玲), Gigi Lai (黎姿), Maggie Siu (邵美琪), Raymond Wong (黃百鳴), Alex Fong (方中信) - Highest Points: Jay Lau (劉錦玲)	Sunny Chan (陳錦鴻)
13	Roman Tam (羅文), Karen Mok (莫文蔚), Vivian Lai (黎瑞恩), Simon Yam (任達華), Kenix Kwok (郭可盈), Theresa Lee (李綺虹)	Karen Mok (莫文蔚)
14	Julian Cheung (張智霖), Kwong Wa (江華), Edmond Leung (梁漢文), Bondy Chiu (趙學而), Amy Fan (樊亦敏), Anna Shangshan (上山安娜)	Julian Cheung (張智霖)
15	Elvina Kong (江欣燕), Johnny Tang (鄧兆尊), Hilary Tsui (徐濠縈), Roger Kwok (郭晉安), Mariane Chan (陳妙瑛), Chan Wai Man (陳惠敏)	Elvina Kong (江欣燕)
16	Lawrence Cheng (鄭丹瑞), Leong Si-Man (梁思敏), Andrew Lam (林敏驄), Wailis Pang (彭子晴), Li Ka-Sing (李家聲), Sammi Cheng (鄭秀文)	Sammi Cheng (鄭秀文)
17	Kent Cheng (鄭則士), Diana Pang (彭丹), Ben Lam (林國斌), Fiona Leung (梁佩玲), Blackie Ko (柯受良), Karen Tong (湯寶如)	Fiona Leung
18	Liu Wai Hung (廖偉雄), Esther Kwan (關詠荷), Benette Pang (彭健新), Stanley Tong (唐季禮), Strawberry Yeung (楊玉梅), William So (蘇永康)	Esther Kwan (關詠荷)
19	Mimi Choo (朱咪咪), Eddie Ng (吳國敬), Winnie Lau (劉小慧), Hawick Lau (劉愷威), Maggie Cheung (張可頤), Tats Lau (劉以達)	Mimi Choo (朱咪咪)
Golden Movie Buff Championship (金裝超級無敵獎門人)	Eric Moo (巫啟賢), Sammi Cheng (鄭秀文), Edmond Leung (梁漢文), David Lui (呂方), Anita Lee (李婉華), Sheila Chan (陳淑蘭), Cutie Mui (梅小惠), Vivian Lai (黎瑞恩), Bobby Au Yeung (歐陽震華), Simon Yam (任達華), Joey Leung (梁榮忠), Julian Cheung (張智霖), Andrew Lam (林敏驄), Blackie Ko (柯受良), Shing Fui-on (成奎安), Diana Pang (彭丹)	Bobby Au Yeung (歐陽震華), Simon Yam (任達華), Joey Leung (梁榮忠), Julian Cheung (張智霖)
20	Ben Wong (黃智賢), Angie Cheung (張慧儀), Wan Kwong (尹光), Kara Hui (惠英紅), Wayne Kwok (郭偉安), Astrid Chan (陳芷菁)	Astrid Chan (張慧儀)
21	Chin Siu Ho (錢小豪), Loletta Lee (李麗珍), Lui Chung Yin (呂頌賢), Chan Siu Ha (陳少霞), Gallen Lo (羅嘉良), Fanny Yuen (袁潔瑩)	Lui Chung Yin (呂頌賢), Fanny Yeun (袁潔瑩)
22	Maria Cordero (瑪俐亞 肥媽), Fan Siu Wong (樊少皇), Sara Lee (李麗蕊), Joyce Lee (李樂詩), Ng Ngai Cheung (吳毅將), Shu Qi (舒淇)	Fan Siu Wong (樊少皇)
23	Adam Cheng (鄭少秋), Nadia Chan (陳松伶), Sunny Chan (陳錦鴻), Vivien Leung (梁小冰), Lam Ka-Tung (林家棟), Patrick Tam (譚耀文)	Lam Ka-Tung (林家棟)
24	Lawrence Ng (吳啟華), Pauline Yeung (楊寶玲), Ken Lo (盧惠光), Amy Chung (鍾慧儀), Bowie Lam (林保怡), Kitman Mak (麥潔文)	Pauline Yeung, Kitman Mak (麥潔文)
25	Liz Kong (江希文), Cheung Tat-Ming (張達明), Pauline Chan (陳寶蓮), Wong He (王喜), Carrie Ng (吳家麗), Leo Ku (古巨基)	Leo Ku (古巨基)
26	Amanda Lee (李蕙敏), Cai Shiming (蔡詩敏), Linda Wong (王馨平), Lillian Ho (何嘉莉), Karen Mok (莫文蔚), Lelia Tong (江麗娜), Eileen Tung (童愛玲), John Tang (鄧一君), Andrew Cheung (張崇基), Peter Cheung (張崇德), Raymond Cho (曹永廉), Ho Yeun Hang (何遠恆)	Andrew Cheung (張崇基), Peter Cheung (張崇德)
27	Miss Hong Kong 1996	No. 5, 6, 7
28	Tam Siu Wai (譚兆偉), Sima Yan (司馬燕), Elvis Tsui (徐錦江), Wong Siu-Fung (王小鳳), Wan Yeung Ming (尹揚明), Winnie Yeung (楊婉儀)	Wong Siu-Fung (王小鳳)
29	Christine Ng (伍詠薇), Louis Koo (古天樂), Gigi Fu (傅明憲), Louise Lee (李司棋), Lau Dan (劉丹), Nancy Sit (薛家燕)	Gigi Fu (傅明憲), Lau Dan (劉丹)
30	Ng Ka Lok (吳家樂), Wong Yuet (黃悅), Rosanne Lui (呂姍), Wong Jim (黃霑), Helen Au (區海倫), Anderson Junior (安德尊)	Helen Au (區海倫)
31	Eric Kot (葛民輝), Lee San San (李珊珊), Ekin Cheng (鄭伊健), Jordan Chan (陳小春), Jerry Lamb (林曉峰), Chin Kar-lok (錢嘉樂)	Lee San San (李珊珊)

== Series 2: Movie Buff Championship (Sr.2) ==
Airdates: 28 May 1997 – 5 November 1997

Timeslots: Wednesday evenings

Hosts: Eric Tsang, Jerry Lamb, Chin Kar-lok

Episodes: 23

One episode was a drama-type episode instead of the usual game show episode.

Episode	Guests	Winner(s)
1	Dicky Cheung (張衛健), Lawrence Cheng (鄭丹瑞), Shooky Kwan (關秀媚), Cass Phang (彭羚), Julian Cheung (張智霖), Jordan Chan (陳小春)	Lawrence Cheng, Jordan Chan
2	Law Ka-Ying (羅家英), Edmond Leung (梁漢文), Theresa Lee (李綺虹), Sheila Chan (陳淑蘭), Shing Fui-on (成奎安), Karen Tong (湯寶如)	Law Ka-Ying, Karen Tong
3	Bobby Au Yeung (歐陽震華), Ada Choi (蔡少芬), Flora Chan (陳慧珊), William So (蘇永康), Patrick Tam (譚耀文), Astrid Chan (陳芷菁)	William So
4	Gallen Lo (羅嘉良), Maggie Cheung (張可頤), Jessica Hsuan (宣萱), Kingdom Yuen (苑瓊丹), Lam Ka-Tung (林家棟), Halina Tam (譚小環)	Halina Tam
5	Francis Ng (吳鎮宇), Christine Ng (伍詠薇), Donna Chu (朱潔儀), Christy Chung (鍾麗緹), Maria Cordero, Alan Tam (譚詠麟)	Francis Ng
6	Natalis Chan (陳百祥), Teresa Mak (麥家琪), Candy Chiu (趙靜儀), Shu Qi (舒淇), Belle Lau (劉曉彤), Louis Yeun (阮兆祥)	Belle Lau
7	Nicolas Tse (謝霆鋒), Miriam Yeung (楊千嬅), Vivian Lai (黎瑞恩), Josie Ho (何超儀), Eric Suen (孫耀威), Cheung Tat-Ming (張達明)	Cheung Tat-Ming
8	Andy Hui (許志安), Cutie Mui (梅小惠), Mark Lui (雷頌德), Stephen Fung (馮德倫), Elvina Kong (江欣燕), Leo Ku (古巨基)	Andy Hui
9	Andrew Lam (林敏驄), Kara Hui (惠英紅), Wayne Lai (黎耀祥), Tats Lau (劉以達), Gigi Fu (傅明憲), Hacken Lee (李克勤)	Kara Hui
10	Jordan Chan (陳小春), Edmond Leung (梁漢文), Astrid Chan (陳芷菁), Jessica Hsuen (宣萱), Andrew Lam (林敏驄), Kingdom Yuen (苑瓊丹), Cheung Tat-Ming (張達明), Vivian Lai (黎瑞恩), Lawrence Cheng (鄭丹瑞), Christine Ng (伍詠薇), Miss Hong Kong 1997 (No. 3,6,14,15,16,18,19,20)	No. 3,6,18,19
11	Yuen Wah (元華), Mariane Chan (陳妙瑛), Amy Chung (鍾慧儀), Wong Kwong Leung (黃光亮), Nadia Chan (陳松伶), Diana Pang (彭丹)	Wong Kwong Leung
12	Linda Wong (王馨平), Ng Kar Lok (吳家樂), Lee San San (李珊珊), Bowie Lam (林保怡), Pauline Yeung (楊寶玲), Simon Lui (雷宇揚)	Ng Kar Lok
13	Nancy Sit (薛家燕), Melvin Wong (黃錦燊), Joyce Tang (滕麗明), Lo Hing-Fai (盧慶輝), Kingdom Yuen (苑瓊丹), Wi Kar Hung (韋家雄)	Nancy Sit, Lo Hing-Fai
14	Hilary Tsui (徐濠縈), Michael Tse (謝天華), Chillie Poon (潘芝莉), Nicola Cheung (張燊悅), Cheung Kam Ching (張錦程), Ken Wong (王合喜)	Hilary Tsui
15	Andy Hui (許志安), Shen Yu Wei (沈玉薇), Shu Qi (舒淇), Wallace Chung (鍾漢良), Theresa Lee (李綺虹), Timmy Hung (洪天明)	Timmy Hung
16	Maggie Siu (邵美琪), Makbau Mak (麥長青), Celia Sie (施念慈), Cheng Yim-Lai (鄭艷麗), Benny Chan (陳浩民), Carman Lee (李若彤)	Carman Lee
17	Wailis Pang (彭子晴), Ng Ngai Cheung (吳毅將), Fiona Yuen (袁彩雲), Yung Kam Cheong (容錦昌), Jay Lau (劉錦玲), Chin Siu Ho (錢小豪)	Wailis Pang, Fiona Yuen
18	Florence Kwok (郭少芸), Joey Leung (梁榮忠), Charmaine Sheh (佘詩曼), Shen Yu (沈魚), Eddie Ng (吳國敬), Athena Chu (朱茵)	Charmaine Sheh
19 - Fraternal Movie Buff Championship (博愛歡樂慈善獎門人)	Eric Kot (葛民輝), Vincent Kuk (谷德昭), Bondy Chiu (趙學而), Dayo Wong (黃子華), Liza Wang (汪明荃), Law Ka-Ying (羅家英)	
20	Tang Siu Cheun (鄧兆尊), Joyce Koi (蓋鳴暉), Alfred Cheung (張堅庭), Monica Chan (陳法蓉), Louis Fan (樊少皇), Helen Au (區海倫)	Monica Chan
21	Ma Tai-lo (馬蹄露), Virginia Yung (翁嘉穗), Annie Wu (吳辰君), Chuk Man Kwan (祝文君), Eileen Tung (童愛玲), Sara Lee (李麗蕊)	Virginia Yung, Eileen Tung
22	Bobby Au Yeung (歐陽震華), Esther Kwan (關詠荷), John Tang (鄧一君), Vivian Lee (李明慧), Julian Cheung (張智霖), Wong Pui Haa (黃佩霞), Tamara Guo (左戎), Michael Tong (唐文龍)	Michael Tong
23	(Drama-Type Episode)	---

== Series 3: The Super Trio Show ==
Airdates: 17 October 1998 – 10 April 1999

Timeslots: Saturday evenings

Hosts: Eric Tsang (曾志偉) Jerry Lamb (林曉峰), Chin Kar-lok (錢嘉樂)

Episodes: 26

Episode	Guests	Winner(s)
1	Shing Fui-on (成奎安), Ada Choi (蔡少芬), Nick Cheung (張家輝), Theresa Lee (李綺虹), Cheung Tat-Ming (張達明), Joyce Chen (陳彥行)	Theresa Lee (李綺虹)
2	Sam Lee (李璨琛), Eason Chan (陳奕迅), Mark Lui (雷頌德), Julian Cheung (張智霖), Lillian Ho (何嘉莉), William So (蘇永康)	Julian Cheung (張智霖)
3	Louis Koo (古天樂), Wong He (王喜), Waise Lee (李子雄), Esther Kwan (關詠荷), Joseph "Joe" Tay (鄭敬基), Lee San San (李珊珊)	Wong He (王喜), Esther Kwan (關詠荷), Joseph "Joe"Tay (鄭敬基)
4	Gigi Leung (梁詠琪), Alex To (杜德偉), Hacken Lee (李克勤), Steven Ma (馬浚偉), Miriam Yeung (楊千嬅), Leo Ku (古巨基)	Gigi Leung (梁詠琪)
5	Mariane Chan (陳妙瑛), Jessica Hsuen (宣萱), Nadia Chan (陳松伶), Fiona Yuen (袁彩雲), Kenix Kwok (郭可盈), Fanny Yuen (袁潔瑩)	Kenix Kwok (郭可盈)
6	Gallen Lo (羅嘉良), Maggie Cheung (張可頤), Lam Ka Tung (林家棟), Bowie Lam (林保怡), Flora Chan (陳慧珊), Sunny Chan (陳錦鴻)	Flora Chan (陳慧珊)
7	Angie Cheung (張慧儀), Louisa So (蘇玉華), Rebecca Chan (陳秀珠), Rain Lau (劉玉翠), Bobby Yip (八両金), Tats Lau (劉以達)	Louisa So (蘇玉華), Rain Lau (劉玉翠)
8	Michael Miu (苗僑偉), Andy Hui (許志安), Eddie Ng (吳國敬), Andrew Lam (林敏驄), Johnny Tang (鄧兆尊), Yammie Nam (藍潔瑛)	Eddie Ng (吳國敬)
9	Ken Wong (王合喜), Stephen Fung (馮德倫), John Tang (鄧一君), Fiona Braidwood (活希兒), Mariane Chan (陳妙瑛), Cathy Chui (徐子淇)	Cathy Chui (徐子淇)
10	Francis Ng (吳鎮宇), Bonnie Law (羅明珠), Dayo Wong (黃子華), Nicolas Tse (謝霆鋒), Ma Tai-lo (馬蹄露), Nicky Wu (吳奇隆)	Nicolas Tse (謝霆鋒)
11	Tam Tak Chi (快必), Chan Chi Cheun (慢必), Elvina Kong (江欣燕), Ken Choi (蔡楓華), Money Lo (盧敏儀), Louis Yuen (阮兆祥)	Louis Yuen (阮兆祥)
12	Blackie Ko (柯受良), David Lui (呂方), Timmy Hung (洪天明), Na Ying (那英), Carina Lau (劉嘉玲), Faye Wong (王菲)	Na Ying (那英)
13	Vincent Kuk (谷德昭), Nancy Kan (蘭茜), Wyman Wong (黃偉文), Fiona Leung (梁藝齡), Emily Kwan (關寶慧), Summer Gold City (夏金城)	Wyman Wong (黃偉文)
14	Shooky Kwan (關秀媚), Max Mok (莫少聰), Anna Shangshan (上山安娜), Joey Leung (梁榮忠), Cutie Mui (梅小惠), Bobby Au-Yeung (歐陽震華)	Cutie Mui (梅小惠)
15	Natalis Chan (陳百祥), Carol Cheng (鄭裕玲), Bennet Phang (彭健新), Liza Wang (汪明荃), Patrick Tse (謝賢), Lydia Shum (沈殿霞)	Carol Cheng (鄭裕玲)
16	Jordan Chan (陳小春), Gigi Leung (梁詠琪), Miriam Yeung (楊千嬅), Grace Ip (葉佩雯), Lam San-san (林珊珊), Ekin Cheng (鄭伊健)	Jordan Chan (陳小春), Gigi Leung (梁詠琪)
17	Belle Lau (劉曉彤), Carlo Ng (吳家樂), Kingdom Yuen (苑瓊丹), Wailis Pang (彭子晴), Nadia Chan (陳松伶), Adam Cheng (鄭少秋)	Carlo Ng (吳家樂)
18	Bobby Au-Yeung (歐陽震華), Esther Kwan (關詠荷), Lawrence Ng (吳啟華), Ada Choi (蔡少芬), Marco Ngai (魏駿傑), Joyce Tang (滕麗名), Makbau Mak (麥長青), Lau Yuk Ceoi (劉玉翠), Louis Yuen (阮兆祥), Cutie Mui (梅小惠), Sam Lee (李璨琛), Laan Sai (蘭茜)	Louis Yuen (阮兆祥), Cutie Mui (梅小惠)
19	Wong Jing (王晶), Gigi Lai (黎姿), Kenny Bee (鍾鎮濤), Michael Tse (謝天華), Bondy Chiu (趙學而), Edmond Leung (梁漢文)	Michael Tse (謝天華)
20	Yuen Wah (元華), Kara Hui (惠英紅), Benny Chan (陳浩民), Hilary Tsui (徐濠縈), Kitty Yuen (阮小儀), Sammy Leung (森美)	Benny Chan (陳浩民)
21	Alex To (杜德偉), Karen Tong (湯寶如), Wong Ching (王青), Charine Chan (陳加玲), Alex Fong (方中信), Sheila Chin (陳淑蘭)	Wong Ching (王青)
22	Richie Jen (任賢齊), Mariane Chan (陳妙瑛), Paulyn Sun (孫佳君), Nick Cheung (張家輝), Christy Chung (鍾麗緹), Annie Wu (吳辰君), Julian Cheung (張智霖)	Richie Jen (任賢齊)
23	Amanda Lee (李蕙敏), Francis Ng (吳鎮宇), Lo Meng (羅莽), Karen Mok (莫文蔚), Michael Wong (王敏德), Sandra Ng (吳君如)	Michael Wong (王敏德), Sandra Ng (吳君如)
24	Jade Leung (梁琤), Wong Kwong Leung (黃光亮), Liz Kong (江希文), Elvis Tsui (徐錦江), Sherming Yiu (姚樂怡), Chin Siu-Ho (錢小豪)	Jade Leung (梁琤), Chin Siu-Ho (錢小豪)
25	Yuen Biao (元彪), Josie Ho (何超儀), Eric Moo (巫啟賢), Monica Chan (陳法蓉),Teresa Mak (麥家琪), Edmond So (蘇志威)	Monica Chan (陳法蓉)
26	Lydia Shum (沈殿霞), Carol Cheng (鄭裕玲), Nancy Sit (薛家燕), Liza Wang (汪明荃), Cheung Tat-Ming (張達明), Theresa Lee (李綺虹), Eason Chan (陳奕迅), Annabelle Lau (劉曉彤), Sam Lee (李璨琛), Nancy Kan (蘭茜), Natalis Chan (陳百祥), Alan Tam (譚詠麟)	Lydia Shum (沈殿霞), Carol Cheng (鄭裕玲), Natalis Chan (陳百祥), Alan Tam (譚詠麟)

== Series 4: The Super Trio Mega Show ==
Airdates: 30 August 1999 – 1 October 1999

Timeslots: Weekday evenings from 8:30 pm to 9:30 pm Hong Kong time

Hosts: Eric Tsang (曾志偉), Jerry Lamb (林曉峰), Chin Kar-lok (錢嘉樂), Nancy Kan (蘭茜), Cindy Au (歐倩怡)

At the time, My Fair Princess played on ATV, creating competition between the networks. Therefore, TVB decided to air the episodes on weekdays.

Episodes: 26

Episode	Guests	Winner(s)
1	Miss Hong Kong 1999, Kingdom Yuen (苑瓊丹), Cheung Yuk Shan (張玉珊), Nick Cheung (張家輝), Jessica Hsuen (宣萱) Michelle Yim (米雪), Bobby Au-Yeung (歐陽震華)	Nick Cheung (張家輝)
2	Cecilia Cheung (張栢芝), Ronald Cheng (鄭中基), Cheung Tat-Ming (張達明), Theresa Lee (李綺虹), Diana Pang (彭丹), Blackie Ko (柯受良); Surprise Guests: Anita Mui (梅艷芳), Anita Yuen (梅艷芳)	Cheung Tat-ming (張達明), Theresa Lee (李綺虹)
3	Tersea Ha (夏萍), Joyce Chen (陳彦行), Maggie Cheung (張可頤), Ben Wong (黃智賢), Bowie Lam (林保怡), Joseph "Joe"Tay (鄭敬基)	Ben Wong (黃智賢)
4	Andy Hui (許志安), Edmond Leung (梁漢文), Hilary Tsui (徐濠縈), Paulyn Sun (孫佳君), Christine Ng (伍詠薇), Edmond So (蘇志威)	Hilary Tsui (徐濠縈)
5	Celine Ma (馬蹄露), May Kwong (鄺文珣), Marco Lo (盧慶輝), Hawick Lau (劉愷威)	Marco Lo (盧慶輝)
6	Hong Kong Sky Kite Association, Hong Kong Taekwondo Association, Cutie Mui (梅小惠), Louisa So (蘇玉華), Louis Yuen (阮兆祥), Michael Tse (謝天華)	Hong Kong Taekwondo Association
7	Lo Mang (羅莽), Lawrence Ng (吳啟華), Leehom Wang (王力宏), Rain Lau (劉玉翠), Adia Chan (陳松伶), Eileen Yeow (姚瑩瑩)	Lawrence Ng (吳啟華), Leehom Wang (王力宏)
8	Raymond Cho (曹永廉), Cheung Siu-fai (張兆輝), Sherming Yiu (姚樂怡), Cherie Chan (陳采嵐)	Armed Forces Training Group
9	Wyman Wong (黃偉文), Mariane Chan (陳妙瑛), Bobby Au Yeung (歐陽震華), Cutie Mui (梅小惠), Jessica Hsuan (宣萱), Chin Siu Ho (錢小豪)	Wyman Wong (黃偉文)
10	Carlo Ng (吳家樂), Zuki Lee (李思蓓), Benny Chan (陳浩民), Nicola Cheung (張燊悦)	Zuki Lee (李思蓓)
11	Joe Ma (馬德鐘), Frankie Lam (林文龍), Gigi Lai (黎姿), Angela Tong (湯盈盈)	Frankie Lam (林文龍)
12	Simon Lui (雷宇揚), Steven Ma (馬志偉), Ken Wong (王合喜), Nichola Cheung (張燊悅), Esther Kwan (關詠荷), Annabelle Lau (劉曉彤)	Esther Kwan (關詠荷)
13	Timmy Hung (洪天明), Celia Sze (施念慈), Ellesmere Choi (蔡子健), Anne Heung (向海嵐)	Celia Sze (施念慈)
14	Louis Yuen (阮兆祥), Bowie Lam (林保怡), Hacken Lee (李克勤), Brianna Chan (陳伶俐), Lillian Ho (何嘉莉), Stephanie Che (車婉婉)	Louis Yuen (阮兆祥)
15	Yvonne Yung (翁虹), Jay Lau (劉錦玲), Yuen Wah (元華), Kenny Wong (黃德斌), Louis Yuen (阮兆祥), Esther Kwan (關詠荷), Celia Sze (施念慈), Frankie Lam (林文龍)	Esther Kwan (關詠荷)
16	Margaret Chung (鍾麗淇), Elvina Kong (江欣燕), Marco Ngai (魏駿傑), John Tang (鄧一君), Emotion Cheung (張錦程), Johnny Tang (鄧兆尊), Natalie Ng (吳文忻), Koei Leung (梁雪湄)	Marco Ngai (魏駿傑)
17	Gordon Lam (林家棟), Tats Lau (劉以達), Almen Wong (黃佩霞), Kara Wai (惠英紅), Ben Ng (吳毅將), Celine Ma (馬蹄露)	Gordon Lam (林家棟)
18	Spencer Leung (梁思浩), Joyce Tang (滕麗名), Fiona Yuen (袁彩雲), Kwong Wa (江華)	Fiona Yuen (袁彩雲)
19	Elvis Tsui (徐錦江), Bennett Pang (彭健新), Benny Chan (陳浩民), Emily Kwan (關寶慧), Sherming Yiu (姚樂怡), Florence Kwok (郭少芸)	Benny Chan (陳浩民)
20	Liza Wang (汪明荃), Bowie Wu (胡楓), Stanley Tong (唐季禮), Elaine Lui (呂少玲), Gordon Lam (林家棟), Florence Kwok (郭少芸), Sherming Yiu (姚樂怡), Marco Ngai (魏駿傑), Fiona Yuen (袁彩雲)	Florence Kwok (郭少芸)
21	Rain Lau (劉玉翠), Louisa So (蘇玉華, Elvina Kong (江欣燕), Evergreen Mak (麥長青), Wayne Lai (黎耀祥), Dicky Cheung (張衛健)	Dicky Cheung (張衛健)
22	Amanda Lee (李蕙敏), Bondy Chiu (趙學而), Anita Yuen (袁詠儀), Nicholas Tse (謝霆鋒), Kenny Bee (鍾鎮濤), Nadalis Chan (陳百祥)	Nadalis Chan (陳百祥)
23	Stephen Fung (馮德倫), Leo Ku (古巨基), Joey Tang (鄧建明), Miriam Yeung (楊千嬅), Karen Tong (湯寶如), Kelly Chan (陳慧琳)	Stephen Fung (馮德倫)
24	Bobby Au-Yeung (歐陽震華), Sheren Tang (鄧萃雯), Kenix Kwok (郭可盈), Michael Tao (陶大宇), Michelle Yim (米雪), Adam Cheng (鄭少秋)	Bobby Au-Yeung (歐陽震華), Michelle Yim (米雪), Adam Cheng (鄭少秋)
25	Patrick Tse (謝賢), Nancy Sit (薛家燕), Liza Wang (汪明荃), Law Kar-ying (羅家英), Theresa Po (寶詠琴), Hung Chiu-fung (洪朝豐), Julian Cheng (張智霖), Christine Ng (伍詠薇), Sam Lee (李璨琛), Johnny Tang (鄧兆尊), Emotion Cheung (張錦程)	All Win
26	(Drama-Type Episode)	---

In certain episodes, previous winners were invited back to compete against each other in a series of games to determine a grand champion.

== Series 5: The Super Trio Show (Sr.2) ==
Airdates: 28 October 2000 – 24 February 2001

Timeslots: Saturday evenings

Hosts: Eric Tsang (曾志偉), Jerry Lamb (林曉峰), Chin Kar-lok (錢嘉樂), Amen Au (區焯文), Bean Lau (劉蜀永), Josephine Shum Po-yee (岑寶兒)

Episodes: 17

Episode	Guests	Winner(s)
1	Bobby Au Yeung (歐陽震華), Gigi Lai (黎姿), Timmy Hung (洪天明), Nnadia Chan (陳松伶), Hacken Lee (李克勤), Laan Sai (蘭茜)	Hacken Lee (李克勤)
2	Ng Ka Lok (吳家樂), Lau Yuk Ceoi (劉玉翠), Shing Fui-on (成奎安), Elvina Kong (江欣燕), Joe Tay (鄭敬y基), May Kwong (鄺文珣)	May Kwong (鄺文珣)
3	Vincent Kuk (谷德昭), Nicola Cheung (張燊悅), Cheung Tat Ming (張達明), Sheila Chan (陳淑蘭), Wyman Wong (黃偉文), Elle Choi (小雪)	Nicola Cheung (張燊悅)
4	Eason Chan (陳奕迅), Josie Ho (何超儀), Wong Pui-Haa (黃佩霞), Chung Siu-Hong (鍾兆康), Cheung Kai-Kai (張佳佳), Bondy Chiu (趙學而), Tats Lau (劉以達)	Josie Ho (何超儀), Bondy Chiu (趙學而)
5	Yvonne Yung (翁虹), Michael Tse (謝天華), Teresa Mak (麥家琪), Blackie Ko (柯受良), Vivian Lai (黎瑞恩), Yuen Biao (元彪)	Michael Tse (謝天華)
6	Julian Cheung (張智霖), Charmaine Sheh (佘詩曼), Calvin Choy (蔡一智), Sherming Yiu (姚樂怡), Yuen Wah (元華), Liz Kong (江希文)	Julian Cheung (張智霖), Charmaine Sheh (佘詩曼)
7	Makbau Mak (麥長青), Louisa So (蘇玉華), Lo Meng (羅莽), Donna Chu (朱潔儀), Rain Li (李彩樺), Lam Ka-Tung (林家棟)	Makbau Mak (麥長青), Louisa So (蘇玉華)
8	Eddie Ng (吳國敬), Christine Ng (伍詠薇), Wong Ceng (王青), Leehom Wang (王力宏), Michelle Saram (雪兒), Liew Hiu-tung (劉曉彤)	Eddie Ng (吳國敬)
9	Ken Wong (王合喜), Ruby Wong (黃卓玲), Raymond Wong (黃浩然), Florence Kwok (郭少芸), Cutie Mui (梅小惠), Louis Yuen (阮兆祥)	Florence Kwok, Cutie Mui (梅小惠), Louis Yuen (阮兆祥)
10	Stephen Au (歐錦棠), Fiona Yuen (袁彩雲), Roy Cheung (張耀揚), Iris Wong (黃泆潼), Amanda Lee (李蕙敏), Spencer Leung (梁思浩)	Fiona Yuen (袁彩雲), Amanda Lee (李蕙敏), Spencer Leung (梁思浩)
11	Wong Hei (王喜), Jessica Hsuen (宣萱), Tang Kin Ming (鄧健明), Jade Leung (梁琤), Elvis Tsui (徐錦江), Joyce Chan (陳彥行)	Wong Hei (王喜), Jessica Hsuen (宣萱), Joyce Chan (陳彥行)
12	Marco Ngai (魏駿傑), Natalie Ng (吳文忻), Bennet Pang (彭健新), Emily Kwan (關寶慧), Moses Chan (陳豪), Cathy Chui (徐子淇)	Bennet Pang (彭健新)
13	Bowie Lam (林保怡), Flora Chan (陳慧珊), Ng Ngai Cheung (吳毅將), Carman Lee (李若彤), Yoyo Mung (蒙嘉慧), Edison Chen (陳冠希)	Flora Chan (陳慧珊), Bowie Lam (林保怡)
14	Michael Tong (唐文龍), Maggie Siu (邵美琪), Wong Kwong Leung (黃光亮), Kingdom Yuen (苑瓊丹), Ellesmere Choy (蔡子健), Sheren Tang (鄧萃雯)	All Win
15	Brian Wong (黃澤鋒), Annie Man (文頌嫻), Simon Lui (雷宇揚), Fanny Yuen (袁潔瑩), Siu Leung (蕭亮), Choi Wai Man (蔡惠敏)	Simon Lui (雷宇揚), Fanny Yuen (袁潔瑩)
16	Elvina Kong (江欣燕), Edmond So (蘇志威), Benny Chan (陳浩民), Bondy Chiu (趙學而), Anna Shangshan (上山安娜/上山詩納), Shum Po Yi (岑寶兒)	Benny Chan (陳浩民), Elvina Kong (江欣燕), Shum Po Yi (岑寶兒)
17	Lam Ka-Tung (林家棟), Florence Kwok (郭少芸), Nnadia Chan (陳松伶), Bobby Au Yeung (歐陽震華), Louisa So (蘇玉華), Lau Yuk Ceoi (劉玉翠)	All Win

== Series 6: A Trio Delights ==
Airdates: 10 August 2002 – 7 December 2002

Timeslots: Saturday evenings from 8:30 pm to 9:30 pm, with the exception of episodes 14 and 16, which played from 8:30 pm to 10:00 pm

Hosts: Eric Tsang (曾志偉), Jerry Lamb (林曉峰), Chin Kar-lok (錢嘉樂)

Episode	Guests	Winner(s)
1	Florence Kwok (郭少芸), Johnny Tang (鄧兆尊), Lam Ka-Tung (林家棟), Joyce Chen (陳彥行), Shing Fui-on (成奎安), Rain Lau (劉玉翠)	Lam Ka-Tung (林家棟)
2	Nick Cheung (張家輝), Cathy Chui (徐子淇), Sam Lee (李璨琛), Nancy Ka (蘭茜), Ronald Cheng (鄭中基), Bowie Tseng (曾寶儀)	Cathy Chui (徐子淇)
3	Timmy Hung (洪天明), Charmaine Sheh (佘詩曼), Ken Wong (王合喜), Stephanie Che (車婉婉), Louis Yuen (阮兆祥), Cutie Mui (梅小惠)	Louis Yuen (阮兆祥)
4	Deric Wan (溫兆倫), Maggie Cheung (張可頤), Michael Tong (唐文龍), Yoyo Mung (蒙嘉慧), Carlo Ng (吳家樂), Annabelle Lau (劉曉彤)	Annabelle Lau (劉曉彤)
5	Stephen Au (歐錦棠), Annie Man (文頌嫻), Raymond Cho (曹永廉), Fiona Yuen (袁彩雲), Lo Meng (羅莽), Donna Chu (朱潔儀)	Lo Meng (羅莽)
6	Julian Cheung (張智霖), Nnadia Chan (陳松伶), Roy Cheung (張耀揚), Liz Kong (江希文), Evergreen Mak (麥長青), Josephine Lam (林其欣)	Evergreen Mak (麥長青)
7	Stephanie Che (車婉婉), Louis Yuen (阮兆祥), Timmy Hung (洪天明), Sherming Yiu (姚樂怡), Johnny Tang (鄧兆尊), Joyce Chen (陳彥行), Miss Hong Kong, E-kids, EO2 Eddie (彭懷安), Eric (謝凱榮), Otto (王志安), Osman (洪智傑)), SiSi	E-kids, EO2
8	Michael Tse (謝天華), Bondy Chiu (趙學而), Ng Ngai-Cheung (吳毅將), Wong Pui-Ha (黃佩霞), Joseph "Joe" Tay (鄭敬基) Christine Ng (伍詠薇)	Joseph "Joe "Tay (鄭敬基)
9	Moses Chan (陳豪), Ada Choi (蔡少芬), Steven Ma (馬浚偉), Anne Heung (向海嵐), Gordon Liu (劉家輝), Chu Mi-mi (朱咪咪)	Steven Ma (馬浚偉)
10	Wayne Lai (黎耀祥), Amanda Lee (李蕙敏), Edmond So (蘇智威), Koei Leung (梁雪湄), Wong Ching (王青), Angie Cheung (張慧儀)	Amanda Lee (李蕙敏)
11	Edwin Siu (蕭正楠), Rain Li (李彩樺), Joseph Lee (李國麟), Teresa Mak (麥家琪), Yuen Wah (元華), Joyce Koi (蓋鳴暉),	Edwin Siu (蕭正楠)
12	Kwok Yiu-Ming (郭耀明), Joyce Tang (滕麗名), Alex Fong (方力申), Bobo Chan (陳文媛),Wan Kwong (尹光), Sherming Yiu (姚樂怡)	Alex Fong (方力申)
13	Eddie Ng (吳國敬), Myolie Wu (胡杏兒), Hugo Ng (吳岱融), Kara Hui (惠英紅), Andrew Lam (林敏驄), Gloria Yip (葉蘊儀)	Hugo Ng (吳岱融)
14	Dicky Cheung (張衛健), Edmond Leung (梁漢文), Fanny Yuen (袁潔瑩), Paulyn Sun (孫佳君), Eric Kot (葛民輝), William So (蘇永康), Sam Lee (李璨琛)	
15	Steve Wong (黃家強), Candy Lo (盧巧音), Marco Ngai (魏駿傑), Belinda Hamnett (韓君婷), Tats Lau (劉以達), Lily Hong (康子妮)	Steve Wong (黃家強)
16	Alex To (杜德偉), Shirley Kwan (關淑儀), Natalis Chan (陳百祥), Nicola Cheung (張燊悅), Victor Chen (陳司翰), Kelly Chen (陳慧琳) Gordon Lam (林家棟), Louis Yuen (阮兆祥), Annabelle Lau (劉曉彤), Lo Meng (羅莽), Joseph "Joe" Tay (鄭敬基), Steven Ma (馬浚偉), Amanda Lee (李惠敏), Edwin Siu (蕭正楠), Alex Fong (方力申), Hugo Ng (吳岱融), Marco Ngai (魏駿傑)	Nicola Cheung (張燊悅)

In the last episode, the first six contestants (Alex To, Shirley Kwan, Natalis Chan, Nicola Cheung, Victor Chen and Kelly Chen) played against each other in a series of individual and sometimes team games. After that, other contestants showed up and competed against the first six contestants as teams. The others won over the original six contestants.

== Series 7: The Super Trio Continues ==
Airdates: 26 September 2004 – 17 July 2005

Hosts: Eric Tsang (曾志偉), Jerry Lamb (林曉峰), Chin Kar-lok (錢嘉樂)

Timeslots: Sunday evenings from 8:30 pm to 9:30 pm with the exceptions of:

- Ep 37 was the 10th anniversary episode: 8:30 to 10:00 pm
- Ep 38 was played in 2 parts:
  - Part 1: 8:00 pm to 9:30 pm
  - Part 2: 10:30 pm to 11:00 pm

Episode	Guests	Winner(s)
1	Lawrence Cheng (鄭丹瑞), Christine Ng (伍詠薇), Chapman To (杜汶澤), Kristal Tin (田蕊妮), Emme Wong (黃伊汶), Timmy Hung (洪天明)	Timmy Hung (洪天明) and Lawrence Cheng (鄭丹瑞)
2	Edmond Leung (梁漢文), Denise Ho (何韻詩), Simon Lui (雷宇揚), Angela Tong (湯盈盈), Shing Fui-on (成奎安), Rain Lau (劉玉翠)	Simon Lui (雷宇揚), Angela Tong (湯盈盈)and Shing Fui-On (成奎安)
3	Nancy Kan (蘭茜), Tats Lau (劉以達), Shirley Yeung (楊思琦), Michael Tse (謝天華), Annabelle Lau (劉曉彤), Johnny Tang (鄧兆尊)	
4	Andy Hui (許志安), Stephanie Cheng (鄭融), Shawn Yue (余文樂), Belinda Hamnett (韓君婷), Ruby Wong (黃卓玲), Lam Suet (林雪)	Shawn Yue (余文樂) and Andy Hui (許志安)
5	Kelly Chen (陳慧琳), Alex Fong (方力申), Eddie Ng (吳國敬), Louis Yuen (阮兆祥), Natalis Chan (陳百祥), Margie Tsang Wah Sin (曾華倩), Elvina Kong (江欣燕), Cutie Mui (梅小惠)	
6	Chu Mi-mi (朱咪咪), Sheren Tang (鄧萃雯), Fiona Yuen (袁彩雲), Carlo Ng (吳家樂), Bennet Phang (彭健新), Ram Chiang (蔣志光)	
7	Michael Tao (陶大宇), Kenix Kwok (郭可盈), Cheung Tat-Ming (張達明), Charmaine Sheh (佘詩曼), Wong Ceng (王青), Nnadia Chan (陳松伶)	Michael Tao (陶大宇)and Charmaine Sheh (佘詩曼)
8	Nick Cheung (張家輝), Sonija Kwok (郭羨妮), Bosco Wong (黃宗澤), Sharon Chan (陳敏芝), Eileen Yeow (姚盈盈), Andrew Lin (連凱)	Bosco Wong (黃宗澤)
9	Evergreen Mak (麥長青), Iris Wong (黃泆潼), Joyce Chen (陳彥行), Lam Chi-chung (林子聰), 2R (Rosanne, Race), EO2 (Eddie (彭懷安), Eric (謝凱榮), Otto (王志安), Osman (洪智傑)	
10	Marco Ngai (魏駿傑), Akina Hong (康華), Gordon Liu (劉家輝), Kingdom Yuen (苑瓊丹), Wong Kwong-leung (黃光亮), Pong-dan (彭丹)	
11	Edmond So (蘇志威), Halina Tam (譚小環), Wayne Lai (黎耀祥), Joyce Tang (滕麗名), Bobby Yip (八両金), Ma Tai-lo (馬蹄露)	
12	Dicky Cheung (張衛健), Rain Li (李彩樺), Yoyo Mung,(蒙嘉慧) Wong Jat-fei (黃一飛), Sherming Yiu (姚樂怡), Timmy Hung (洪天明)	Dicky Cheung (張衛健)
13	Miriam Yeung (楊千嬅), Raymond Wong (黃浩然), Bobo Chan (陳文媛), Sammy Leung (森美), Ken Wong (王合喜), Stephanie Che (車婉婉)	
14	Louisa So (蘇玉華), Lee San-San李珊珊, Lily Hong (康子妮), Derek Tsang (曾國祥), Yuen Wah (元華), Girl's Only Dormitory (Toby Leung (梁靖琪), Elise Liu, Macy Chan (陳美詩), Bella Cheung	
15	Danny Summer (夏韶聲), Joyce Koi (蓋明暉), Steve Wong (黃家強), Hacken Lee (李克勤), Cecilia Cheung (張柏芝), Anya Wu (安雅)	
16	Lou Hoi-pang (盧海鵬), Annie Liu (廖安麗), Patrick Dunn (鄧梓蜂), Annabelle Lau (劉曉彤), Johnny Tang (鄧兆尊), Florence Kwok (郭少芸)	
17	Lawrence Cheng (鄭丹瑞), Timmy Hung (洪天明), Nancy Kan (蘭茜), Sammy Lau (劉永健), Shirley Yeung (楊思琦),Halina Tam (譚小環), Andrew Lam (林敏聰), Carlo Ng (吳家樂); Brianna Chan (陳伶俐), Eileen Yeow (姚盈盈), Iris Wong (黃泆潼), Raymond Cho (曹永廉)	
18	Leila Tong,(唐寧) Christine Ng (伍詠薇), Sammul Chan (陳鍵鋒), Joel Chan (陳山聰), Alex Fong (方力申), Cookies (Stephy Tang (鄧麗欣), Theresa Fu (傅穎), Miki Yeung (楊愛瑾), Kary Ng (吳雨霏)	
19	Ada Choi (蔡少芬), Michael Tong (唐文龍), Donna Chu (朱潔儀), Lo Meng (羅莽), Catherine Hung (洪欣), Benz Hui (許紹雄)	
20	Sam Lee (李璨琛), Bondy Chiu (趙學而), Wilfred Lau (劉浩龍), Jade Kwan (關心妍), Tenky Tin (田啟文), Perry Chiu (焦媛)	
21	Joan Tong (唐麗球), Yvonne Lam (林漪娸), Gaa Bik-yi (嘉碧兒), Natalie Ng (吳文昕), Josephine Shum (岑寶兒), Priscilla Chi (戚黛黛), Simon Yam (任達華), Andy Tai (戴誌偉), Ken Lo (盧惠光), Leung Kar-yan (梁家仁), Hugo Ng (吳岱融), Ray Chan (陳紀匡)	
22	Joey Leung (梁榮忠)， Rain Lau (劉玉翠), kk Cheung Kok Keung (張國強), Gloria Yip (葉蘊儀), Andrew Lam (林敏聰), Michelle Ye (葉璇)	
23	Ricky Hui (許冠英), Ella Koon (官恩娜), Julian Cheung (張智霖), Almen Wong (黃佩霞), Myolie Wu (胡杏兒), Joe Ma (馬德鐘)	
24	Michael Tao (陶大宇)，Anne Heung (向海嵐), Moses Chan (陳豪), Bernice Liu (廖碧兒), Cheung Tat-Ming (張達明), Louisa So, Carlo Ng (吳家樂), Nnadia Chan (陳松伶)	
25	Theresa Lee (李綺紅), Akina Hong (康華), Ken Wong (王合喜), Ben Wong (黃智賢), Louis Yuen (阮兆祥), Johnny Tang (鄧兆尊), Shirley Yeung (楊思琦), Annabelle Lau (劉曉彤)	
26	Ellen Chan (陳雅倫), Benny Chan (陳浩民), Sherming Yiu (姚樂怡), Eddie Kwan (關禮傑), Michael Tse (謝天華), Bondy Chiu (趙學而), Joseph Lee (李國麟), Joyce Chen (陳彥行)	
27	Gordon Lam (林家棟), Florence Kwok (郭少芸), Bosco Wong (黃宗澤), Angela Tong (湯盈盈), Bobby Yip (八両金), Mimi Choo (朱咪咪), Ben Ng (吳毅將), Natalie Ng (吳文忻)	
28	Eason Chan (陳奕迅), Denise Ho (何韻詩), Josie Ho (何超儀), Candy Lo (盧巧音), Emotion Cheung (張錦程), Evergreen Mak (麥長青), Edwin Siu (蕭正楠), Koei Leung (梁雪湄)	
29	Christine Ng (伍詠薇), Joel Chan (陳山蔥), Terence Lee (李子雄), Sharon Chan (陳敏之), Kenny Ho (何家勁), Michelle Ye (葉璇), Joyce Tang, (滕麗名), Michael Miu (苗僑偉)	
30	Wong Hei (王喜), Kiwi Yuen (袁潔儀), Ellesmere Choy (蔡子健), Perry Chiu (焦媛), Timmy Hung (洪天明), Fiona Yuen (袁彩雲), Simon Lui (雷宇揚), Fanny Yuen (袁潔瑩)	
31	Prudence Liew (劉美君), Tats Lau (劉以達), Joey Leung (梁榮忠), Sunny Chan (陳錦鴻), Emotion Cheung (張錦程), Rain Lau (劉玉翠), Louisa So (蘇玉華), Karen Tong (湯寶如), Edmond So (蘇志威), Bennet Phang (彭健新)	
32	Yuen Wah (元華), Yuen Qiu (元秋), Edmond Leung (梁漢文)，Gordon Liu (劉家輝), Otto (王志安)@EO2, Jade Tsang (梁琤), Ella Koon (官恩娜), Liz Kong (江欣慈/江希文) ||	
33	Moses Chan (陳豪), Niki Chow (周麗淇), Wayne Lai (黎耀祥), Halina Tam (譚小環),Eric Moo (巫啟賢), Pong-dan (彭丹), Stephen Au (歐錦棠), Ma Tai-lo (馬蹄露)	
34	Cutie Mui (梅小惠), Florence Kwok (郭少芸), Angie Cheung (張慧儀), Bobo Chan (陳文媛), Edwin Siu (蕭正楠), Benny Chan (陳浩民), Wilfred Lau (劉浩龍), Lawrence Chou (周俊偉)	
35	Patrick Dunn (鄧梓峰), Johnny Tang (鄧兆尊), Bennet Phang (彭健新), Shirley Yeung (楊思琦), Fiona Yuen (袁彩雲), Michelle Ye (葉璇)，Ronald Cheng (鄭中基), Sam Lee (李璨琛), Cheung Tat-Ming (張達明), Louis Yuen (阮兆祥), Miki Yeung (楊愛謹), Lou-fan (魯芬)	
36	Gordon Lam (林家棟)，Carlo Ng (吳家樂), Perry Chiu (焦媛), Eva Lai (黎燕珊), Natalie Ng (吳文忻), Ricky Wong (王俊棠), Josephine Shum (岑寶兒), Timmy Hung (洪天明), Jonathan Cheung (張頴康), Sherming Yiu (姚樂怡), KK Cheung Kwok Keung (張國強), Iris Wong (黃泆潼), Renee Dai (戴夢夢), Gwai Cung (鬼塚), Michael Tse (謝天華), Ella Koon (官恩娜), Akina Hong (康華), Astrid Chan (陳芷菁), Sharon Chan (陳敏之), Lo Meng (羅莽), Michael Tong (唐文龍)	
37	Bobby Yip (八両金), Alex Fong (方力申), Ken Wong (王合喜), Hei Wong (王喜), Kristal Tin (田蕊妮), Christine Ng (伍詠薇), Natalie Ng (吳文忻), Carlo Ng (吳家樂), Sam Lee (李璨琛), Vincent Kok (谷德昭), Louis Yuen (阮兆祥), Ella Koon (官恩娜), Lam Suet (林雪), Sherming Yiu (姚樂怡), Timmy Hung (洪天明), Michael Miu (苗橋偉), Ma Tai-lo (馬蹄露), KK Cheung Kwok Keung (張國強), Cheung Tat-Ming (張達明), Emotion Cheung (張錦程), Koei Leung (梁雪湄), Benz Hui (許紹雄), Bobo Chan-Man-Woon (陳文媛), Natalis Chan-Pak Cheung (陳百祥), Astrid Chan (陳芷菁), Joyce Chen (陳彥行), Sharon Chan (陳敏之), Kelly Chen (陳慧琳), Pong-dan (彭丹), Tommy Wong (黃光亮), Almen Wong (黃佩霞), Bosco Wong (黃宗澤), Iris Wong (黃泆潼), Miki Yeung (楊愛瑾), Michelle Ye (葉璇), Bondy Chiu (趙學而); Winnie Lau (劉小慧), Tats Lau (劉以達), Rain Lau (劉玉翠), Annabelle Lau (劉曉彤), Ronald Cheng (鄭中基), Johnny Tang (鄧兆尊), Lou-fan (魯芬), Wayne Lai (黎耀祥), Michael Tse (謝天華), Belinda Hamnett (韓君婷), Lo Meng (羅莽), Louisa So (蘇玉華), Nancy Kan (蘭茜), Lily Hong (康子妮), Angela Tong (湯盈盈)	
38	Timmy Hung (洪天明), Simon Lui (雷宇揚), Kenny Wong (黃德斌), Carlo Ng (吳家樂), Wong Hei (王喜), Joel Chan (陳山聰), EO2 (Eddie (彭懷安), Eric (謝凱榮), Otto (王志安), Osman (洪智傑)), Sherming Yiu (姚樂怡); Iris Wong (黃泆潼), Shirley Yeung (楊嘉雯), Emily Kwan -po -wai (關寶慧), Josephine Shum Po-yee (岑寶兒), Joyce Chen (陳彥行), Natalie Ng (吳文忻), Nikki / Priscilla Chung Tsz Ki (鍾禧文), Farini Cheung (張睿玲), Toby Leung (梁靖琪), Miss Hong Kong	

== Post-Series 7: The Super Trio - Total Recall ==
Timeslot: Saturday, 16 July 2005 from 10:30 pm to 11:00 pm

Hosts: Jerry Lamb (林曉峰) and Chin Kar-lok (錢嘉樂)

This final special featured clips from past series, and parts of the final ceremony in the 37th episode of The Super Trio Continues.

== Pre-Series 8: Super Trio Wonder Trip ==
Airdates: 9 March 2008 – 23 March 2008

Episodes: 3

Hosts: Eric Tsang (曾志偉), Louis Yuen (阮兆祥), Chin Kar-lok (錢嘉樂) and Wong Cho Lam (王祖藍)

Featured Guests: Ella Koon (官恩娜), Timmy Hung (洪天明), Angela Tong (湯盈盈), Fiona Yuen (袁彩雲), Jeanette Leung Ching Kok (梁政鈺), Toby Leung (梁靖琪)

The series is the spin-off series before the upcoming eighth series of the Super Trio. The spin-off series follows the cancelling of the show in 2005 and the rebuilding the show Jerry Lamb (林曉峰)left TVB for ATV)(亞洲電視), as Eric Tsang (曾志偉), Louis Yuen (阮兆祥), Chin Kar-lok (錢嘉樂) and Wong Cho Lam (王祖藍) and their guests travel the world to find new games to bring back to Hong Kong for the upcoming eight series.

== Series 8: Super Trio Supreme ==
Airdates: 30 March 2008 – 22 March 2009

Hosts: Eric Tsang (曾志偉), Louis Yuen (阮兆祥), Chin Kar-lok (錢嘉樂), Wong Cho Lam (王祖藍)

Timeslots: Sunday evenings from 8:30 pm to 9:30 pm, after changing to Sunday evenings from 9:00 pm to 10:00 pm

Originally, the broadcast length was 26 episodes but due to very strong viewership from this series, the number of episodes was increased first to 39, then to 43.

Episode	Guests	Winner(s)
1	Michael Miu (苗僑偉), Bosco Wong (黃宗澤), Charmaine Sheh (佘詩曼), Kristal Tin (田蕊妮), Johnny Tang (鄧兆尊), Cutie Mui (梅小惠), Tiffany Hew (丘涴鋌), Cheng Ching Ting (鄭婧婷), Crystal Wong (王翎蓓)	Charmaine Sheh (佘詩曼), Cutie Mui (梅小惠)
2	Shirley Yeung (楊思琦), Perry Chiu (焦媛), Joel Chan (陳山聰), Carlo Ng (吳家樂), Liu Fan (魯芬), Bennett Pang (彭健新)	Joel Chan (陳山聰)
3	FAMA (農夫), I Love U Boyz (艾粒仔), Elanne Kwong (江若琳), Freeze, Ken Wong (王合喜/王凱韋), Shermon Tang (鄧上文)	Freeze, Shermon Tang (鄧上文)
4	Jordan Chan (陳小春), Jo Koo (谷祖琳), Louisa So (蘇玉華), Michael Tse (謝天華), Halina Tam (譚小環), Patrick Dunn (鄧梓峰)	Halina Tam (譚小環)
5	Joyce Tang (滕麗明), Rain Lau (劉玉翠), Lam Suet (林雪), Edmond So (蘇志威), Kiki Sheung (商天娥), KK Cheung (張國強)	Kiki Sheung (商天娥), Rain Lau (劉玉翠), Lam Suet (林雪)
6	Cherrie Ying (應採兒), Terrence Yin (尹子維)、Sharon Chan (陳敏之), Raymond Wong Ho-yin (黃浩然), Minnie Cheung (張美妮), Otto Wong Chi On (王志安)	Cherrie Ying (應採兒), Oscar Wong Chi On (王志安)
7 (Special Malaysia episode)	Hong Kong team: Rocky Cheng (鄭健樂), Otto Chan (陳志健), Shirley Yeung (楊思琦), Koni Lui (呂慧儀), Malaysia team: Vivien Yeo (楊秀惠), Angie Cheung (張慧儀), Tiffany Hew (丘涴鋌), Ngan Mei Yan (顏薇恩)	tie
8	Theresa Lee (李綺虹), Sunny Chan (陳錦鴻), Iris Wong (黃泆潼), Eddie Pang (彭懷安), Amigo Choi (崔建邦), Paisley Wu (胡蓓蔚)	Sunny Chan (陳錦鴻), Eddie Pang (彭懷安), Amigo Choi (崔建邦)
9	Wilfred Lau (劉浩龍), Eddie Ng (吳國敬), Ricky Fan (范振鋒), Ken Lo (盧惠光), Renee Dai (戴夢夢), Vangie Tang (鄧穎芝), JJ Jia (賈曉晨), Maggie Lee (李曼筠)	Eddie Ng (吳國敬), Ricky Fan (范振鋒), Renee Dai (戴夢夢)
10	Raymond Cho (曹永廉), Yoyo Mung (蒙嘉慧), Florence Kwok (郭少芸), Jack Wu (胡諾言), Macy Chan (陳美詩), Chris Lai (黎諾懿)	Raymond Cho (曹永廉), Macy Chan (陳美詩)
11	Mimi Chu (朱咪咪), Matthew Ko (高鈞賢), Tracy Ip (葉翠翠), Ella Koon (官恩娜), Yuen Wah (元華), Tsui Tien Yau (徐天佑)	Mimi Chu (朱咪咪), Yuen Wah (元華)
12	Diana Pang (彭丹), Ben Ng (吳毅將), Emily Kwan (關寶慧), Derek Kwok (郭政鴻), Wong You-Nam (黃又南), Sharon Luk (陸詩韻)	Diana Pang (彭丹), Ben Ng (吳毅將)
13 (Second Malaysia episode)	Kenny Wong (黃德斌), Sherming Yiu (姚樂怡), Natalie Ng (吳文忻), Gordon Lam (林家棟), Johnny Tang (鄧兆尊), Emily (潘碧寧), Joanne (尤鳳音), Jessie (林寶玉), Zoe (陳英麗), Jason (賈森)	tie
14	Natalie Meng (孟瑤), Jazz Lam (林子善), Gordon Lam (林家棟), Winnie Leung (梁敏儀), Celine Ma (馬蹄露), Andrew Lam (林敏驄)	Natalie Meng (孟瑤), Jazz Lam (林子善), Gordon Lam (林家棟)
15	Joyce Cheng (鄭欣宜), Timmy Hung (洪天明), Ankie Beilke (貝安琪), Carl Ng (吳嘉龍), Shaun Tam (譚俊彥), Ada Wong (王子涵)	Joyce Cheng (鄭欣宜), Timmy Hung (洪天明)
16	HotCha, Simon Lui (雷宇揚), Edwin Siu (蕭正楠), Emme Wong (黃伊汶), Fennie Yuen (袁潔瑩), Lawrence Chou (周俊瑋)	Simon Lui (雷宇揚)
17	Kwong Leung Wong (黃光亮), Lam Yi Kei (林漪娸), Louis Cheung (張繼聰), Charmaine Fong (方皓玟), King Kong (金剛), Paisley Wu (胡蓓蔚)	Louis Cheung (張繼聰), King Kong (金剛)
18	Nancy Sit (薛家燕), Lily Ng (吳麗珠), Annie Liu (廖安麗), Pang Pang (班班), David Lo (盧大偉), English Tang (鄧英敏), Anderson Junior (安德尊), Emotion Cheung (張錦程), Meini Cheung (張美妮), Carlo Ng (吳家樂), Iris Wong (黃泆潼)	tie
19	Benny Chan (陳浩民), Sherming Yiu (姚樂怡), Jacquline Ch'ng (莊思敏), (羅家英), (陳煒), (彭敬慈)	(羅家英)
20 (Third Malaysia episode)	Michael Tse (謝天華), Timmy Hung (洪天明), Angela Tong (湯盈盈), Annie Man (文頌嫻), Margaret Chung (鍾麗淇), Florence Kwok (郭少芸), Toby Leung (梁靖琪)	Timmy Hung (洪天明)
21	Natalie Ng (吳文忻), Mandy Lieu (劉碧麗), Yumiko Cheng (鄭希怡), William Chan (陳偉霆), (劉以達), Him Law (羅仲謙)	tie
22 (Best Selling Secrets cast)	Yoyo Chen (陳自瑤), Elvina Kong (江欣燕), Bill Chan (石修), Vin Choi (蔡淇俊), Stephen Au (歐錦棠), Brian Thomas Burrell (布偉傑), Jeanette Leung (梁政珏), Florence Kwok (郭少芸)	Bill Chan (石修), Elvina Kong (江欣燕), Stephen Au (歐錦棠)
23	Wong Ching (王青), Elaine Jin (金燕玲), Kelvin Kwan (關楚耀), Wylien Chiu (趙碩之), Koni Lui (呂慧儀), Wong He (王喜)	Wong Ching (王青), Elaine Jin (金燕玲), Koni Lui (呂慧儀)
24 (A Bride for a Ride cast)	Louisa So (蘇玉華), Nicky Law (羅貫峰), Nancy Wu (胡定欣), Rain Lau (劉玉翠), Chun Wong (秦煌), KK Cheung (張國強), Lee kwok Lun (李國麟), Gigi Wong (黃淑儀)	tie
25	Jin Au-Yeung (歐陽靖), Janet Chow (周家蔚), Gloria Yip (葉蘊儀), Wu Wai Hong (胡渭康), Bennett Pang (彭健新), Mimi Choo (朱咪咪)	Jin Au-Yeung (歐陽靖), Bennett Pang (彭健新), Mimi Choo (朱咪咪)
26	Ella Koon (官恩娜), Toby Leung (梁靖琪), Michael Tse (謝天華), Otto Wong (王志安), Lam Suet (林雪), Perry Chiu (焦媛), Lo Fun (魯芬), Johnny Tang (鄧兆尊)	tie
27 (Fourth Malaysia episode)	Bosco Wong (黃宗澤), Carlo Ng (吳家樂), King Kong (金剛), Meini Cheung (張美妮), Catherine Chau (周家怡), Natalie Meng (孟瑤), Ryan Tay (鄭鴻杉), Connie Lam (林寶玉), Nicholas Ong (翁書尉), Cheng Shu-Ping (鄭淑萍), Joanne Yew (尤鳳音), Kelly Tham (譚嘉麗)	Bosco Wong (黃宗澤), Carlo Ng (吳家樂), King Kong (金剛), Meini Cheung (張美妮), Catherine Chau (周家怡), Natalie Meng (孟瑤)
28	Eric Suen (孫耀威), Stephanie Che (車婉婉), Sharon Luk (陸詩韻), Evergreen Mak (麥長青), Louis Fan (樊少皇), Kiki Sheung (商天娥)	Sharon Luk (陸詩韻), Louis Fan (樊少皇)
29	Shirley Yeung (楊思琦), Johnson Lee (李思捷), Kenny Wong (黃德斌), Jo Koo (谷祖琳), Farini Cheung (張睿玲), I Love You Boyz	Johnson Lee (李思捷), Farini Cheung (張睿玲)
30 (200th Episode Party Special)	Natalis Chan (陳百祥), Toby Leung (梁靖琪), Carlo Ng (吳家樂), Bosco Wong (黃宗澤), Michael Tse (謝天華), Sherming Yiu (姚樂怡), Louis Cheung (張繼聰), Sunny Chan (陳錦鴻), Rain Lau (劉玉翠), Emotion Cheung (張錦程), Perry Chiu (焦媛), Emily Kwan (關寶慧), King Kong (金剛), Angela Tong (湯盈盈), Gill Mohindepaul Singh (喬寶寶), Theresa Lee (李綺虹), Brian Thomas Burrell (布韋傑), Vivien Yeo (楊秀惠), Hiromi Wada (裕美), JJ Jia (賈曉晨), Tat Dik (狄易達), Percy Fan (范萱蔚), Zac Koo (高皓正), EO2	Natalis Chan (陳百祥), Hiromi Wada (裕美), JJ Jia (賈曉晨), Tat Dik (狄易達), Percy Fan (范萱蔚), Zac Koo (高皓正), EO2
31	FAMA (農夫), Freeze, Ken Wong (王凱韋), Rain Li (李彩華), Tats Lau (劉以達), Kimura Rui (木村乃)	FAMA (農夫), Rain Li (李彩華)
32	Diana Pang (彭丹), Edmond So (蘇志威), Modi Qui (邱翊橙), HotCha, Carl Ng (吳嘉龍), Teresa Daley (紀培慧)	Edmond So (蘇志威), Carl Ng (吳嘉龍)
33	Kara Hui (惠英紅), Marsha Yuan (原子鏸), Mandy Lieu (劉碧麗), Rocky Cheng (鄭健樂), Yuen Wah (元華), Wong Yau-Nam (黃又南)	tie
34	Chan Ho Tak (陳浩德), Wan Kwong (尹光), Rosanne Lui (呂珊), Mimi Chu (朱咪咪), Lo Chun Shun (魯振順), Ella Koon (官恩娜), Vangie Tang (鄧穎芝), Sherman Chung (鍾舒漫), Wilfred Lau (劉浩龍), Chan Yat Fung (陳日豐), Kelvin Kwan (關楚耀)	
35	Gordon Liu (劉家輝), Timmy Hung (洪天明), Amigo Choi (崔建邦), Eric Suen (孫耀威), Rebecca Chan (陳秀珠), Natalie Tong (唐詩詠), Shirley Yeung (楊思琦), Ankie Beilke (貝安琪)	
36	Edmond Leung (梁漢文), Eddie Ng (吳國敬), Yetta Tse (謝珊珊), Snow Suen (孫慧雪), Sammy Leung (森美), Kitty Yuen (阮小儀), Leo Chim (詹志文), Yan Ng (吳日言), King Kong (金剛), Paisley Wu (胡蓓蔚), Benjamin Chiang (姜文杰), Sherry Chen (陳爽)	
37	Michael Miu (苗僑偉), Jazz Lam (林子善), Elanne Kong (江若琳), Oscar Leung (梁烈唯), Dominic Lam (林嘉華), Wada Hiromi (裕美), Bennett Pang (彭健新), Sherming Yee (姚樂怡), Timmy Hung (洪天明), Sharon Luk (陸詩韻), Kayi Cheung (張嘉兒), Carlo Ng (吳家樂), Kaki Leung (梁嘉琪)	
38	Tsui Wing (徐榮), Vincent Wong (王浩信), HotCha, Wayne Lai (黎耀祥), Edwin Siu (萧正楠), Florence Kwok (郭少芸), Jeanette Leung (梁政珏), Evergreen Mak (麥長青), Lam Yi Kei (林漪娸), Chun Wong (秦煌), Joseph Lee (李國麟), Rain Lau (劉玉翠)	
39	Janet Chow (周家蔚), Yumiko Cheng (鄭希怡), Deep Ng (吳浩康), Kiki Sheung (商天娥), Michael Tong (唐文龍), Timmy Hung (洪天明), Annie Man (文頌嫻), Johnny Tang (鄧兆尊), Anderson Junior (安德尊), Meini Cheung (張美妮), Carl Ng (吳嘉龍), Ankie Beilke (貝安琪)	
40	Angela Tong (湯盈盈), Bosco Wong (黃宗澤), Toby Leung (梁靖琪), Koni Lui (呂慧儀), Joel Chan (陳山聰), Liz Kong (江希文)	
41	Benny Chan (陳浩民), Edmond So (蘇志威), Brian Burrell (布偉傑), Fennie Yuen (袁潔瑩), Irene Wong (汪琳), Kara Hui (惠英紅), Lily Ho (何傲兒), Wong Hei (王喜), Vin Choi (蔡淇俊), Ma Tai Lo (馬蹄露), Shum Po Yee (岑寶兒), Dexter Young (楊天經)	Benny Chan (陳浩民), Fennie Yuen (袁潔瑩), Shum Po Yee (岑寶兒), Wong Hei (王喜)
42	Ivan Wang (王友良), Steven Cheung (張致恆), HotCha, Joyce Tang (滕麗名), Derek Kok (郭政鴻), Wylie Chiu (趙碩之), Catherine Chou (周家怡), Tin Kai-Man (田啟文), Anjo Leung (梁曉豐), Fanny Lee Man-Fan (李漫芬), Lee Kin-Yan (李健仁), Canti Lau (劉錫明)	
43	Toby Leung (梁靖琪), Sherming Yee (姚樂怡), JJ Jia (賈曉晨), Mandy Lieu (劉碧麗), Ella Koon (官恩娜), Meini Cheung (張美妮), Sharon Chan (陳敏之), Florence Kwok (郭少芸), Timmy Hung (洪天明), Michael Tse (謝天華), Joel Chan (陳山聰), Otto Wong (王志安), Louis Cheung (張繼聰), Wilfred Lau (劉浩龍), FAMA (農夫), Mimi Choo (朱咪咪), Natalie Meng (孟瑤), Johnny Tang (鄧兆尊), Yueh Wah (元華), Carlo Ng (吳家樂)	Timmy Hung (洪天明), Michael Tse (謝天華), Joel Chan (陳山聰), Otto Wong (王志安), Louis Cheung (張繼聰), Wilfred Lau (劉浩龍), FAMA (農夫), Johnny Tang (鄧兆尊), Yueh Wah (元華), Carlo Ng (吳家樂)
44	Alan Tam (譚詠麟), Sandra Ng (吳君如), Koni Lui (呂慧儀), Kitty Yuen (阮小儀), Bennett Pang (彭健新), JJ Jia (賈曉晨), Michael Tse (謝天華), Joel Chan (陳山聰), Rain Lau (劉玉翠), Natalie Meng (孟瑤), Carlo Ng (吳家樂), Louis Cheung (張繼聰), Ella Koon (官恩娜), Toby Leung (梁靖琪), Cutie Mui (梅小惠)	

== Pre-Series 9: Super Trio Game Master Pre-show ==
Airdate: 18 April 2010

Episodes: 1

Hosts: Eric Tsang, Chin Kar-lok, King Kong (金剛), Elvina Kong (江欣燕), Otto Wong (王志安)

Featured Guests: Carlo Ng, Timmy Hung, Angela Tong, Toby Leung, Sammy Leung, Kitty Yuen, Eddie Pang, HotCha

== Series 9: Super Trio Game Master ==
Airdates: 25 April 2010 – 21 November 2010

Hosts: Eric Tsang (曾志偉), Chin Kar-lok (錢嘉樂), King Kong (金剛), Elvina Kong (江欣燕), Otto (王志安) @EO2

Timeslots: Sunday evenings from 9:00 pm to 10:00 pm

Episode	Guests	Winner(s)
1	Michael Tse (謝天華), Florence Kwok (郭少芸), Edwin Siu (蕭正楠), Joyce Cheng (鄭欣宜), Joel Chan (陳山聰), Sherming Yiu (姚樂怡), Johnny Tang (鄧兆尊), Leung Ka Kei (梁嘉琪)	Joel Chan, Sherming Yiu, Johnny Tang, Leung Ka Ki
2	Mimi Chu (朱咪咪), Wong Cho Lam (王祖藍), Samantha Ko (高海寧), Cheung Kwok Keung (張國強), Louis Yuen (阮兆祥), Sherry Chen (陳爽), Meini Cheung (張美妮), Oscar Leung (梁烈唯)	Mimi Chu, Wong Cho Lam, Samantha Ko, Cheung Kwok Keung
3	Harriet Yeung (楊詩敏), Gordon Lam (林家棟), Lam Suet (林雪), Wong Yau Nam (黃又南), Emily Kwan (關寶慧), JJ (賈曉晨), MC Jin (歐陽靖), Kayi Cheung (張嘉兒)	Michelle Yeung, Gordon Lam, Lam Suet, Emily Kwan
4	Fly with Me cast: Moses Chan (陳豪), Wai Kar Hung (韋家雄), Rachel Kan (簡慕華), Ada Choi (蔡少芬), Raymond Cho (曹永廉), Catherine Chau (周家怡), Kenny Wong (黃德斌), Queenie Chu (朱慧敏)	Moses Chan, Wi Kar Hung, Rachel Kan, Ada Choi
5	The Voice Contestants: Auston Lam (林師傑), Alfred Hui (許廷鏗), Ryan Lau (劉威煌), Adrian Chau (周志文), Daniel Chau (周志康), Tang Siu Hau (鄧小巧), Stephanie Ho (何雁詩), Ho Ching Ching (何晶晶) Kiki Sheung (商天娥), Benette Pang (彭健新), Jack Wu (胡諾言), Akina Wah (康華), Derek Kok (郭政鴻), Janet Chow (周家蔚)	Kiki Sheung, Benette Pang, Jack Wu, Akina Wah, Derek Kok, Janet Chow
6	Perry Chiu (焦媛), Joe Tay (鄭敬基), Sharon Luk (陸詩韻), Rocky Cheng (鄭健樂), Lawrence Chou (周俊偉), Donald Tong (唐劍康), Josephine Ng (朱薰), Jacquline Chong (莊思敏)	Perry Chiu, Joe Tay, Sharon Luk, Rocky Cheng
7	Yumiko Cheng (鄭希怡), Deep Ng (吳浩康), Sherman Chung (鍾舒漫), Tat Dik (狄易達), FAMA (農夫), Paisley Wu (胡蓓蔚), Gill Mohinderpaul Singh (喬寶寶), Shermon Tang (鄧上文)	Tie
8	Lou-fan (魯芬), Him Law (羅仲謙), Koni Lui (呂慧儀), Li Kwok-Lun (李國麟), Freeze, Club de Banana (香蕉俱樂部)	Freeze, Club de Banana
9	Sammy Leung (森美), Toby Leung (梁靖琪), Vangie Tang (鄧穎芝), Florence Kwok (郭少芸), Eric Tse (謝凱榮), Stephen Au 歐錦棠, Brian Thomas Burrell (布偉傑), Jim Tang (鄧永健), Mannor Chan (陳曼娜), Jeanette Leung (梁政珏), Fire Lee (火火), Tsang Kit Ruth (路芙)	Tie
10	Big Four: William So (蘇永康), Andy Hui (許志安), Dicky Cheung (張衛健), Edmond Leung (梁漢文), Amanda Lee (李蕙敏), Bosco Wong (黃宗澤), Crystal Tin (田蕊妮), Angela Tong (湯盈盈), Mimi Lo (羅敏莊), Josephine Shum (岑寶兒)	Tie
11	Tats Lau (劉以達), Ng Ka Lok (吳家樂), Yvonne Lam (林漪娸), Stephanie Che (車婉婉), Carol Yeung (楊梓瑤), Wilfred Lau (劉浩龍), Renee Dai (戴夢夢), Oscar Leung (梁烈唯), Dexter Young (楊天經), Cindy Lee (李思雅), KK Cheung (張國強), Icy Wong (黃婉曼)	Renee Dai, Oscar Leung, Dexter Young, Cindy Lee, KK Cheung
12	Chapman To (杜汶澤), Wong Cho Lam (王祖藍), Tien You (徐天佑), Kama Lo (羅凱珊), Maggie Lee (李曼筠), Amigo Choi (崔建邦), Evergreen Mak (麥長青), Skye Chan (陳倩揚), Kayi Cheung (張嘉兒), Katy Kung (龔嘉欣)	Tie
13	Johnson Lee (李思捷), Joel Chan (陳山聰), Eileen Yeow (姚瑩瑩), Cilla Kung (樂 瞳), Grace Wong (王君馨), Alex Lam (林子善), Gordon Liu (劉家輝), June Chan (陳 琪), YoYo Chen (陳自瑤), Rebecca Chan (陳秀珠)	Gordon Liu, Rebecca Chan, June Chan, Alex Lam, YoYo Chen
14	Timmy Hung (洪天明), Marsha Yuan (原子鏸), Ursula Wong (黃宇詩), Benji Chiang (姜文杰), Lesley Chiang (姜麗文), Wong Hei (王 喜), Ruco Chan (陳展鵬), Meini Cheung (張美妮), Catherine Chau (周家怡)	Timmy Hung, Marsha Yuan, Ursula Wong, Benji Chiang, Lesley Chiang
15	Lam Suet (林 雪), Wong Yau Nam (黃又南), Sire Ma (馬 賽), Jess Shum (沈卓盈), Matthew Ko (高鈞賢), Sherry Chen (陳 爽), Steven Cheung (張致恆), Tats Lau (劉以達), Ken Hung (洪卓立), Matthew Ko (高鈞賢), Katy Kung (龔嘉欣)	Sherry Chen, Steven Cheung, Tats Lau, Ken Hung, Matthew Ko, Katy Kung
16	Beauty Knows No Pain cast: Michelle Yim (米雪), Joyce Tang (滕麗名), Maggie Cheung (張可頤), Elena Kong (江美儀), Lily Ho (何傲兒), JJ (賈曉晨), Kibby Lau (劉 俐), Vanko Wong (王淑玲), Wayne Lai (黎耀祥), Pierre Ngo (敖嘉年), Kenneth Lo (盧惠光), Vin Choi (蔡淇俊), Extra: Joe Ma (馬德鐘)	Joe Ma, Kibby Lau, Lily Ho, Michelle Yim, Vin Choi, Kenneth Lo, Joyce Tang
17	David Lo (盧大偉), Nancy Sit (薛家燕), Gigi Wong (黃淑儀), Jaime Chik (戚美珍), Tang Ying Man (鄧英敏), Louis Yuen (阮兆祥), Cutie Mui (梅小惠), Annabelle Lau (劉曉彤), Johnny Tang (鄧兆尊), Elvina Kong (江欣燕)	Tie
18	Michael Tse (謝天華), Carlo Ng (吳家樂), Sherming Yiu (姚樂怡), Koni Lui (呂慧儀), Lesley Chiang (姜麗文), Louis Cheung (張繼聰), Michael Lam (林澄光), Natalie Ng (吳文忻), Elaine Yiu (姚子羚)	Tie
19	Miss Hong Kong Pageant: Timmy Hung (洪天明), Bob Lam (林盛斌), Wong On Kei (黃安琪), Zheung Lai Sa (張莉莎), Connie Man (文凱玲), Phoebe Pang (彭慧中), Ria Tong (湯寶珍), Kitty Li (李俍嬿), William Chan (陳偉霆), MC Jin (歐陽靖), Samantha Ko (高海寧), Candy Yuen (袁嘉敏), Janet Chow (周家蔚), Heidi Chu (朱凱婷), Kayi Cheung (張嘉兒)	William Chan, MC Jin, Samantha Ko, Candy Yuen, Janet Chow, Heidi Chu, Kayi Cheung
20	Can't Buy Me Love cast: Lee Heung Kam (李香琴), Susan Tse (謝雪心), Charmaine Sheh (佘詩曼), Selina Li (李詩韻), Yoyo Chen (陳自瑤), Elaine Yiu (姚子羚), Charmaine Li (李思欣), Moses Chan (陳 豪), Louis Yuen (阮兆祥), Raymond Wong Ho-yin (黃浩然), Kenneth Ma (馬國明), Joseph Lee (李國麟), Edwin Siu (蕭正楠)	Tie
21	Jordan Chan (陳小春), Perry Chiu (焦 媛), Ken Wong (王合喜), Emily Kwan (關寶慧), Terence Yin (尹子維), Cheung Tat Ming (張達明), Lawrence Chou (周俊偉), HotCha, June Tang (鄧芷茵), Wildchild (野 仔)	Tie
22	Lo Hoi Pang (盧海鵬), Jamie Chik (戚美珍), Annie Liu (廖安麗), Mo Lin Yu (余慕蓮), Dominic Lam (林嘉華), Louie Castro (賈思樂), Sara Lee (李麗蕊), Cheung Gam Ching (張錦程), Ben Wong (黃智賢), Brian Wong (黃澤鋒), Claire Yiu (姚嘉妮), Chuk Man Gwan (祝文君), Meini Cheung (張美妮)	Lo Hoi Pang, Jamie Chik, Annie, Mo Lin Yu, Dominic Lam, Louie Castro, Sara Lee
23	Tin Kai Man (田啟文), Lee Kin Yan (李健仁), Lou-fan (魯 芬), Lesley Chiang (姜麗文), Joey Mak (麥皓兒), Denis Ng (吳 彤), Rain Lau (劉玉翠), Oscar Leung (梁烈唯), Eddie Pang (彭懷安), Shirley Yeung (楊思琦), Bobby Yip (八両金), Kandy Wong (黃山怡)	Rain Lau, Oscar Leung, Eddie Pang, Shirley Yeung, Bobby Yip, Kandy Wong
24	Johnny Tang (鄧兆尊), Sherming Yiu (姚樂怡), Derek Kok (郭政鴻), Annie Man (文頌嫻), Michelle Yeung (楊詩敏), Tyson Chak (翟凱泰), Carlo Ng (吳家樂), Samantha Ko (高海寧), Anderson Junior (安德尊), Yvonne Lam (林漪娸), Det Dik (狄易達), Yellow	Tie
25	Louis Cheung (張繼聰), Peter Lai (黎彼得), Rain Li (李彩華), JJ Jia (賈曉晨), Barry Yip (葉文輝), YES, Mimi Chu (朱咪咪), Koni Lui (呂慧儀), Catherine Chau (周家怡), Him Law (羅仲謙), Zuki Lee (李思蓓), Square	Mimi Chu, Koni Lui, Catherine Chau, Him Law, Zuki Lee, Square
26	Patrick Dunn (鄧梓峰), Joel Chan (陳山聰), Stephen Au (歐錦棠), Rosanne Lui (呂 珊), Sherry Chen (陳 爽), Jeanette Leung (梁政珏), No Regrets cast: Wayne Lai (黎耀祥), Evergreen Mak (麥長青), Ben Wong (黃智賢), Susan Tse (謝雪心), Eileen Yeow (姚瑩瑩), Elena Kong (江美儀)	Wayne Lai, Evergreen Mak, Ben Wong, Susan Tse, Eileen Yeow, Elena Kong
27	Yuen Wah (元 華), Chin Siu Ho (錢小豪), Chrissie Chau (周秀娜), Jiang Luxia (蔣璐霞), Michael Tse (謝天華), Carlo Ng (吳家樂), Toby Leung (梁靖琪), Sherming Yiu (姚樂怡), Gordon Lam (林家棟), Florence Kwok (郭少芸), Lesley Chiang (姜麗文), Hanjin Tan (陳奐仁), MC Jin (歐陽靖), Louis Yuen (阮兆祥), Wong Cho Lam (王祖藍), Samantha Ko (高海寧), Kayi Cheung (張嘉兒)	Gordon Lam, Florence Kwok, Lesley Chiang, Hanjin Tan, MC Jin

== Series 10: Super Trio Maximus ==
Airdates: 26 May 2013 – 12 January 2014

Timeslots: Sunday evenings

Hosts: Eric Tsang (曾志偉), Jordan Chan (陳小春), Jerry Lamb (林曉峰), Chin Ka-lok (錢嘉樂), Louis Yuen (阮兆祥), Wong Cho-lam (王祖藍), King Kong (金剛), Elvina Kong (江欣燕), Nancy Kan (蘭茜)，Otto (王志安)@EO2, Lindsey Ellingson

Episode	Guests	Winner(s)
1 (Special Japan episode)	Michael Tse (謝天華), Timmy Hung (洪天明), Koni Lui (呂慧儀), Toby Leung (梁靖琪), Mandy Lieu (劉碧麗), Samantha Ko (高海寧), Charmaine Fong (方皓玟)	No scores kept
2 (Special awards to outstanding contestants over the last 18 years episode)	Nancy Sit (薛家燕), Michael Tse (謝天華), Carlo Ng (吳家樂), Diana Pang (彭丹), Andrew Lam (林敏驄), Johnny Tang (鄧兆尊), Timmy Hung (洪天明), Natalie Meng (孟瑤), Janet Chow (周家蔚)	Tie
3	Lawrence Ng (吳啟華), Chrissie Chau (周秀娜), Oscar Leung (梁烈唯), Alice Chan (陳煒), Louis Cheung (張繼聰), Kitty Yuen (阮小儀)	Lawrence Ng (吳啟華), Chrissie Chau (周秀娜), Oscar Leung (梁烈唯)
4	A Change of Heart cast: Michael Miu (苗僑偉), Vincent Wong (王浩信), Mandy Wong (黃智雯), Rachel Poon (潘曉彤), Bosco Wong (黃宗澤), Niki Chow (周麗淇), Elaine Yiu (姚子羚), Eric Chung (鍾志光)	Bosco Wong (黃宗澤), Niki Chow (周麗淇), Elaine Yiu (姚子羚), Eric Chung (鍾志光)
5	Awfully Lawful cast: Johnson Lee (李思捷), Roger Kwok (郭晉安), Raymond Cho (曹永廉), Pal Sinn (單立文), Grace Wong (王君馨), Selena Li (李詩韻), Sharon Chan (陳敏之), Joyce Tang (滕麗名)	Tie
6	Bobby Au Yeung (歐陽震華), Mimi Chu (朱咪咪), Sammy Sum (沈震軒), Bob Lam (林盛斌), Cilla Kung (樂瞳), Paulyn Sun (孫佳君)	Bob Lam (林盛斌), Cilla Kung (樂瞳), Paulyn Sun (孫佳君)
7	Kenny Wong (黃德斌), Sammy Leung (森美), Kandy Wong (黃山怡), Jacquelin Chong (莊思敏), Kiki Sheung (商天娥), C-Kwan (鄭詩君)	Jacquelin Chong (莊思敏), Kiki Sheung (商天娥), C-Kwan (鄭詩君)
8	Alfred Hui (許廷鏗), Joyce Cheng (鄭欣宜), Tracy Ip (葉翠翠), 6-Wing (陸永權), Raymond Wong Ho-yin (黃浩然), Derek Kok (郭政鴻)	
9	Carlo Ng (吳家樂), Florence Kwok (郭少芸), Chris Lai (黎諾懿), Queenie Chu (朱慧敏), Akina Hong (康華), Ken Wong (王凱韋), Lou-fan (魯芬), Mandy Lieu (劉碧麗)	Tie
10	Det Dik (狄易達), Crystal Cheung (張紋嘉), Winkie Lai (黎美言), Charmaine Fong (方皓玟), Hanjin Tan (陳奐仁), Eddie Pang (彭懷安), Tyson Chak (翟凯泰), Harriet Yeung (楊詩敏), Alice Lau (劉雅麗),	Det Dik (狄易達), Crystal Cheung (張紋嘉), Winkie Lai (黎美言), Charmaine Fong (方皓玟), Hanjin Tan (陳奐仁)
11	Bennett Pang (彭健新), Ella Koon (官恩娜), Pakho Chau (周柏豪), Shiga Lin (連詩雅), KK Cheung (張國強), Natalie Meng (孟瑤), Tin Kai Man (田啟文), Tsang Kit Ruth (路芙)	Tie
12	Maria Cordero (瑪俐亞 肥媽), Luk Hoo (陸浩明), Tony Hung (洪永城), Priscilla Wong (黃翠如), Ellen Chan (陳雅倫), Sherming Yiu (姚樂怡), Eddie Kwan (關禮傑), Timmy Hung (洪天明)	Maria Cordero (瑪俐亞 肥媽), Luk Hoo (陸浩明), Tony Hung (洪永城), Priscilla Wong (黃翠如)
13	Terence Tsui (小肥), Dada Chan (陳靜), Ava Yu (雨僑), Alex Fong (方力申), Edmond Pang (彭浩翔), Derek Tsang (曾國祥), Jacky Choi (蔡潔), Shawn Yue (余文樂)	Tie
14	Tats Lau (劉以達), Cheung Tat Ming (張達明), Vincent Kok (谷德昭), Stephy Tang (鄧麗欣), William Hu (胡渭康), Karen Tong (湯寶如),	Tie
15-16	Chui Tien You (徐天佑), Mag Lam (林欣彤), Justin Lo (側田), G.E.M (鄧紫棋), Jacqueline Wong (黃心穎), Jazz Lam (林子善), Eliza Sam (岑麗香), Bosco Wong (黃宗澤)	
17	Elvina Kong (江欣燕), Otto (王志安)@EO2, Eddie Pang (彭懷安) Louis Cheung (張繼聰)and Celina Ma (馬蹄露), Carlo Ng (吳家樂), Regen Cheung (張惠雅 ), Rainky Wai (蔚雨芯)，Carol Yeung (楊焉)，Fire Lee (火火), Ricky Fan (范振峰), Koni Lui (呂慧儀)	
18	Young and Dangerous cast: Ekin Cheng (鄭伊健), Jordan Chan (陳小春), Michael Tse (謝天華)，Ka-Lok Chin (錢嘉樂)，Jerry Lamb (林曉峰)Rose Chan (陳嘉桓)，Jerry Ku (古明華)，Jade Jia (賈曉晨)，Evergreen Mak (麥長青)	
19	Pal Sinn (單立文), Kitty Yuen (阮小儀), Amigo Choi (崔建邦)，Yuri Chan (陳蕊蕊), King Kong (金剛)，Louis Yuen (阮兆祥)，Andrew Cheung (張崇基)，Peter Cheung (張崇德), Bondy Chiu (趙學而)，Stephanie Che (車婉婉)，Frederick Cheng (鄭俊泓)	
20	Joe Junior, Rosanne Lui (呂珊), Henry Lo (魯振順), Lee Lung Kei (李龍基), Bowie Woo (胡楓), Susan Kung (謝雪心), Chun Wong (秦煌) and Nancy Sit (薛家燕).	
21	Brother's Keeper cast: Maria Luisa de Melo Leitão (黎芷珊), Helen Tam (譚玉瑛)，Pierre Ngo (敖嘉年)，Raymond Cho (曹永廉)，Samantha Ko (高海寧)，Kristal Tin (田蕊妮)，Edwin Siu (蕭正楠)，Ruco Chan (陳展鵬)，Leanne Li，1984年11月25日 (李亞男)and Becky Lee (李壁奇).	Tie
22 (Halloween episode)	Timmy Hung (洪天明)，Joe Ma (馬德鐘)，Him Law (羅仲謙)，Quinn Ho (何君誠)，Benjamin Yuen (袁偉豪)，Jack Hui (許家傑)，Angela Tong (湯盈盈)，Toby Leung (梁靖琪)，Charmaine Sheh (佘詩曼)，Janet Chow (周家蔚)，Sherming Yiu (姚樂怡)，Annie Man (文頌嫻)，Margaret Chung (鍾麗淇).	
23 (TV series promotion)	The Hippocratic Crush II cast:Paisley Hu (胡蓓蔚)，Lawrence Ng (吳啟華)，Jerry Ku (古明華)，Tracy Chu (朱千雪)，Derek Kok (郭政鴻).｜｜Inbound Troubles cast:Wong Cho Lam (王祖藍)，Ivana Wong (王菀之)，Mimi Choo (朱咪咪)，Corinna Kathy Chamberlain (陳明恩)，Bob Lam (林盛斌)，May Chan (陳嘉佳 小寶).	
24	Hong Kong students such as students such as PSY. Bowie Woo (胡楓)，Emotion Cheung (張錦程)，Carlo Ng (吳家樂)，Fiona Yuen (袁彩雲)，Annabelle Lau (劉曉彤)，Eileen Yeow (姚盈盈). Florence Kwok (郭少芸)，Danny Lau (劉丹)，Eyvonne Lam (林漪娸)，Kenny Wong (黃德斌)，Joey Law (羅天宇)，Angel Chiang (蔣家旻).	
25 (Movie promotion)	Movie Kick Ass Girl Chrissie Chau (周秀娜)，Vincci Cheuk (卓韻芝)，Dada Lo (盧頌之)，Kelvin Kwan (關楚耀)，King Chiu (趙勁皓)，Law Kar Ying (羅家英)，Bobby Yip (八両金)，Cecilia Fong (方伊琪)，Li Lai Ha (李麗霞)，Lam Suet (林雪)	
26 (TV series promotion )	Actresses from "M Club" such as Elvian Kong (江欣燕Carman Lee Yuek Tung (李若彤) and Loletta Lee (李麗珍)，Angie Cheong (張慧儀)，Gloria Yip (葉蘊儀)and also younger actresses such as Kandy Wong (黃山怡)，Venus Wong (王敏奕)，Annice Ng (吳燕菁)，Jeannie Chan (陳瀅)，Anjaylia Chan (陳嘉寶)，Winki Lai (賴慰玲)，Cheronna Ng (吳嘉熙). Male artists such as Steven Cheung Chi Hang (張致恆)，Luk Wing Kuen (陸永權)Joseph "Joe"Tay (鄭敬基), Amigo Choi (崔建邦)，David Lo (盧大衛)，Eric Chung (鍾志光)were also featured.	
27 (Special Huizhou episode)	Timmy Hung (洪天明)，William Chak (翟威廉)，Samantha Ko (高海寧)，Jeana Ho (何佩瑜)，Yu Kiu (雨橋)，ZO (沈志明)，Gregory Wong (王宗堯)，Dominic Ho (何浩文)，Tracy Ip (葉翠翠)，Kayi Cheung (張嘉兒)，Toby Chan (陳庭欣)，Barbie Liu (夏尉喻)，Gloria Chan (陳華鑫)，Rocky Cheng (鄭健樂).	
28	Nancy Sit (薛家燕)，Billy Luk (陸永權)，Stephen Cheng (鄭詩君)，Eric Kwok (郭偉亮)，Jonathan Wong (王梓軒)，King Kong (金剛)Lollipop@F Owodog Chuang (敖犬)，Fabien Yu (小煜)，Awayne Liu (阿緯)William Liao (威廉).	
29	Julian Cheung (張智霖)，Christine Ng (伍詠薇)，Niki Chow (周麗淇)，Eddie Ng (吳國敬)，Josie Ho (何超儀)，Edmond Leung (梁漢文)，Kenny Chung (鍾鎮濤)，Calvin Cho (蔡一智)，Remus Choy (蔡一傑)，Edmond So (蘇志威)，Alex Fong (方力申)，Stephanie Cheng (鄭融)，Pong Nan (藍奕邦)	
30	Kelly Chen (陳慧琳), Angela Tong (湯盈盈)，Koni Lui (呂慧儀)，Toby Leung (梁靖琪)，Joyce Chan (陳彥行)，Margaret Chung (鍾麗淇)，Annie Man (文頌嫻)，Sherming Yiu (姚樂怡)，Natalie Meng (孟瑤)， Pai Sinn (單立文), Louis Cheung (張繼聰), KK Cheung (張國強)，Timmy Hung (洪天明), Carlo Ng (吳家樂)，Bob Lam (林盛斌)，Junior Anderson (安德尊)，Johnny Tang (鄧兆尊)	
31 (Last episode)	Kelly Chen,(陳慧琳) Pal Sinn (單立文), Louis Cheung (張繼聰), Timmy Hung,(洪天明) Angela Tong (湯盈盈), Toby Leung (梁靖琪), Koni Lui (呂慧儀), KK Cheung (張國強), Carlo Ng (吳家樂), Bob Lam (林盛斌), Annie Man (文頌嫻), Joyce Chan (陳彥行), Sherming Yiu (姚樂怡), Margaret Chung (鍾麗淇), Anderson Junior (安德尊), Johnny Tang (鄧兆尊), Natalie Meng (孟瑤)	

== Series 11: Super Trio Returns ==
Airdates: 31 July 2022 – 1 January 2023

Timeslots: Sunday evenings from 8:30-9:30 PM

Hosts: Eric Tsang, Louis Yuen, Mayenne Mak, Chin Ka-lok, Louis Yuen, Amisha Ng, Hellston Ching, Wong Cho-lam (Special guest host), Nancy Lan Sai (Guest host (Prize Master Representative))

*- indicates that they are a prize elder, but played as a guest due to the lack of players on one team

Note: Episode 6 was umbrellaed under the special "THE SHOW MUST GO ON" timeslot, due to the rescheduling of the Miss Hong Kong Pageant and also the fact that Tsang was noticeably absent for this episode.

Episode	Guests	Winner(s)
1	Your Highness Team:Kalok Chow (周嘉洛), Jeannie Chan (陳瀅), Joey Wong JW (王灝兒), Jonathan Cheung (張穎康), Brian Chu (朱敏瀚) Singers Team:Eric Kwok (郭偉亮), Hanjin Tan (陳奐仁), Stephanie Cheng (鄭融), Shiga Lin (連詩雅), Lesley Chiang	
2	Crazy Runners：Mandy Wong, Benjamin Yuen, Joel Chan, Paisley Hu, Jack Wu Come Home Love Team：Pal Sinn、 Joyce Tang, Koni Lui、Andrea So	
3	Fortune Buddies: Wong Cho-lam*, Louis Yuen*, Johnson Lee, Kiki Sheung, Kwong Man-Chun New Year is a Game team: Bob Lam, Ashley Chu, Daniel Chau, Yeung Chiu-Hoi, Kirby Lam	
4	Big White Duel II team: Roger Kwok, Moses Chan, Kenneth Ma, Nancy Wu, Kelly Cheung, Natalie Tong Big City Shop team: Meini Cheung, Junior Anderson, Pheobe Pang, Jarryd Tam, Kayan Choi, Antonio Ng	
5	J2ers: C-Kwan and TVB J2 Celebrities Stars Academy Team: Sammy Leung and all Stars Academy season 1 contestants.	
6	Super family: Angela Tong, Toby Leung, Margaret Chung, Janet Chow, Annie Man Super enemy team: Alex Fong, Carlo Ng, Derek Wong, Frederick Cheng, Anthony Ho	
7	Nancy Sit team: Nancy Sit, Hera Chan, Kristy Shaw, Telford Wong, Leonard Cheng, William Chak Come home love team: Iris Lam, Mandy Lam, Jack Hui, Kim Li, Ricco Ng, Adrien Yau	
8	Grasshopper team: Tiffany Kwan, William Hu, Sharon Chan, Remus Choi, Edmond So Unknown team: Bosco Wong, Alice Chan, Moon Lau, Sisley Choi, Kevin Chu	
9	Beauty team: Joel Chan, Hera Chan, Irina Ho, Sophie Yip, Henry Lo etc War team: Bob Lam, Moon Lau, Angel Chiang, Rebecca Zhu, Sunny Dai etc	
10	Young and restless team: Crystal Fung, Sandy To, Luk Ho Ming, Krysella Wong, Niklas Lam, Frederick Tsui Get on a flat team: Rosita Kwok, Elena Kong, Carmaney Wong, Andrew Lam, Yuki Law, Eric Tang	
11	Samantha Ko team: Lai Lok Yee, Samantha Ko, Ali Lee, Leo Kwan, Kandy Wong Scoop team: Patrick Lam, Amy Ng, Joe Yau, Rachel Chan, Albert Au	
12	Miss Hong Kong team: Toby Chan, Amy Fan, Heidi Chu, Honey Ho, Amber Chan, Elizabeth Wu, Jessica Liu Super Trio team: Elvina Kong, Matthew Ho, Otto Wong, Snow Suen, Tyson Chak, Stephanie Ho	
13	Forensic Hero 5 team: Jacky Cai, Venus Wong, Benjamin Yuen, Tony Hung, Eica Chan, Irina Tang, Andy Lin, Lincoln Hui, Kelly Fu Get on a flat team: Rosita Kwok, Elena Kong, Ethan Lam, Andrew Lam, Leo Kwan, Eric Tang	
14	I've got the power team: Joel Chan, Moon Lau, Tiffany Lau, Lenna Yeung, Jazz Lam, Cheung Kwok Keung Poker team: JW, Eric Kwok, Sonya Chan, Jojo Wong, Alex Fong, Wilfred Lau	
15	TVB Anniversary main character team: Edwin Siu, Wayne Lai, Owen Cheung, Raymond Wong, Yoyo Chen, Winki Lai TVB Anniversary livestream team: Purple Ng, Krystl Shiu, Alycia Chan, Jarvis Chow, Edmond Hui, Jeoffrey Wong	
16	The goddess of scoop team: Maggie Leung, Joan Lee, Katerina Leung, Cathy Wong, Kitty Lai Super trio buddies team: Joyce Chan, Ruth Tsang, Lam Suet, Rose Chan, Benett Pang, Johnny Tang	
17	Singers team: Kiki Sheung, Judas Law, Timothy Wong, Ricky Fan, Jonathan Wong Profession impossible team: Owen Cheung, Joey Thye, Charlene Houghton, Danny Hung, Eden Lau	
18	Justice Sung begins team: Elaine Yiu, Cheung Tak Ming, Lam Tze Chung, Jacqueline Ch'ng, Dada Wong, Dominic Ho, Gabriel Harrison Win again team: Rachel Chan, Roxanne Ho, Stepahnie Lee, Frankie Choi, Derek Wong, Andy Lin	
19	TKO team: Benjamin yuen, Bowie Cheung, Joel Chan, Pal Sinn, Paisley Hu Michael Miu team: Michael Miu, Yoyo Chen, Prisicilla Wong, Bosco Wong, Rebecca Zhu Super trio buddies team: Angela Tong, Alex Fong, Toby Leung, Timmy Hung, Carlo Ng Big city shop: Junior Anderson, Jarryd Tam, Sky Chiu, Claire Yiu, Ashley Chu	

== International versions ==
Country	Title	Host(s)	Network	Date of airing
Vietnam	Thế giới vui nhộn	Vương Khang, Sỹ Luân, Trí Hải	HTV7	10 October 2006 - 2008
