= Artistes 311 Love Beyond Borders =

2011 fund raising campaign in Hong Kong for tsunami victims in Japan

- Native name: 愛心無國界311燭光晚會
- Date: 1 April 2011
- Time: 7:00 p.m. (HKT)
- Location: Causeway Bay, Victoria Park, Hong Kong
- Type: Benefit concert
- Motive: Fundraising for Japanese tsunami victims
- Outcome: HK$18 million raised
- Website: Official website (archive)

Artistes 311 Love Beyond Borders (Chinese: 愛心無國界311燭光晚會) was a major fund raising campaign held in Hong Kong for the victims of the Japan 2011 Tōhoku earthquake and tsunami. The event was organized by the Hong Kong Performing Artistes Guild and began at 7 p.m. on 1 April 2011 at Causeway Bay Victoria park. About HK$18 million were raised in this event alone, not counting other fund raisers. Converted into US Dollars, the charity concert raised approximately 2.31 million dollars.

== Preparation ==
The name of the event 311 came from 11 March, the day that the earthquake occurred. The concert event lasted 3 hours featuring 300 local and overseas artists, including some from Japan. There were about 8,000 to 10,000 people in attendance. Japan's consul general Yuji Kumamaru and his wife also attended and sat in the front row seat. On 24 March about 100 celebrities at RTHK recorded the theme song "Succumb not to sorrow" (不要輸給心痛).

== Broadcast ==
More than 150 donation hotlines were available. The event was telecasted live. Broadcast was available on major stations in HK, People's Republic of China, Taiwan, Malaysia, Singapore, Japan. Event was hosted by Eric Tsang, Lawrence Cheng, Carol Cheng, Sylvia Chang, Agnes Chan.

== Participants ==
The following are some of the participants at the concert. The list is incomplete.

- Jackie Chan
- Andy Lau
- Hacken Lee
- Masatoshi Nakamura
- Jaycee Chan
- Gillian Chung
- Charlene Choi
- Aaron Kwok
- Kay Tse
- G.E.M
- AKB48
- Miriam Yeung
- Kwon Sang-woo
- George Lam
- Edmond Leung
- Bosco Wong
- Angelababy
- Chrissie Chau
- Wonder Girls
- Shirley Kwan
- Judy Ongg
- Raymond Lam
- Lowell Lo
- Endy Chow
- Louis Cheung
- Donnie Yen
- Joey Yung
- Sen Masao
- Alan Tam
- Kenny Bee
- The Wynners
- Agnes Chan
- Richie Ren
- Coco Lee
- Prudence Liew
- Andy Hui
- Michael Tse
- Myolie Wu
- Jonathan Lee
- Joyce Cheng
- Khalil Fong
- Sammi Cheng
- Jade Kwan
- Juno Mak
- Elanne Kong
- Virginia Lok (樂易玲)
- Bennett Pang (Bennett Pang)
- Mr.
- Theresa Fu
- Jonathan Wong
- Lionel Richie (from remote)
- Tony Leung (from video)
- Park Jin Young
- Sherina Munaf

== Other similar event ==
On 20 March 2011 a much smaller scale fund raising campaign called "全城關愛日本大地震" was held in HK. Many of the participants have also worked closely in Japan's industry. Participants include:

- Ivan Wang (王友良)
- Marie Zhuge (諸葛梓岐)
- Yan Ng
- Vangie Tang
- Wylie Chiu (趙碩之)
- Philip Wei (韋雄)
- Yip Wai-ting (葉慧婷)
- Rico Kwok (郭力行)
- Carisa Yan (甄穎珊) from Freeze
- Chow Wing-hang (周永恆)
- 4anda
- Venus Yiu (姚嘉兒)
- JuJu Chan
- Renee Lee (李蘊)
- Alice B
- Rednoon

== See also ==
- Fight and Smile
- Artistes 512 Fund Raising Campaign
