= EO2 =

Hong Kong Cantopop dance group

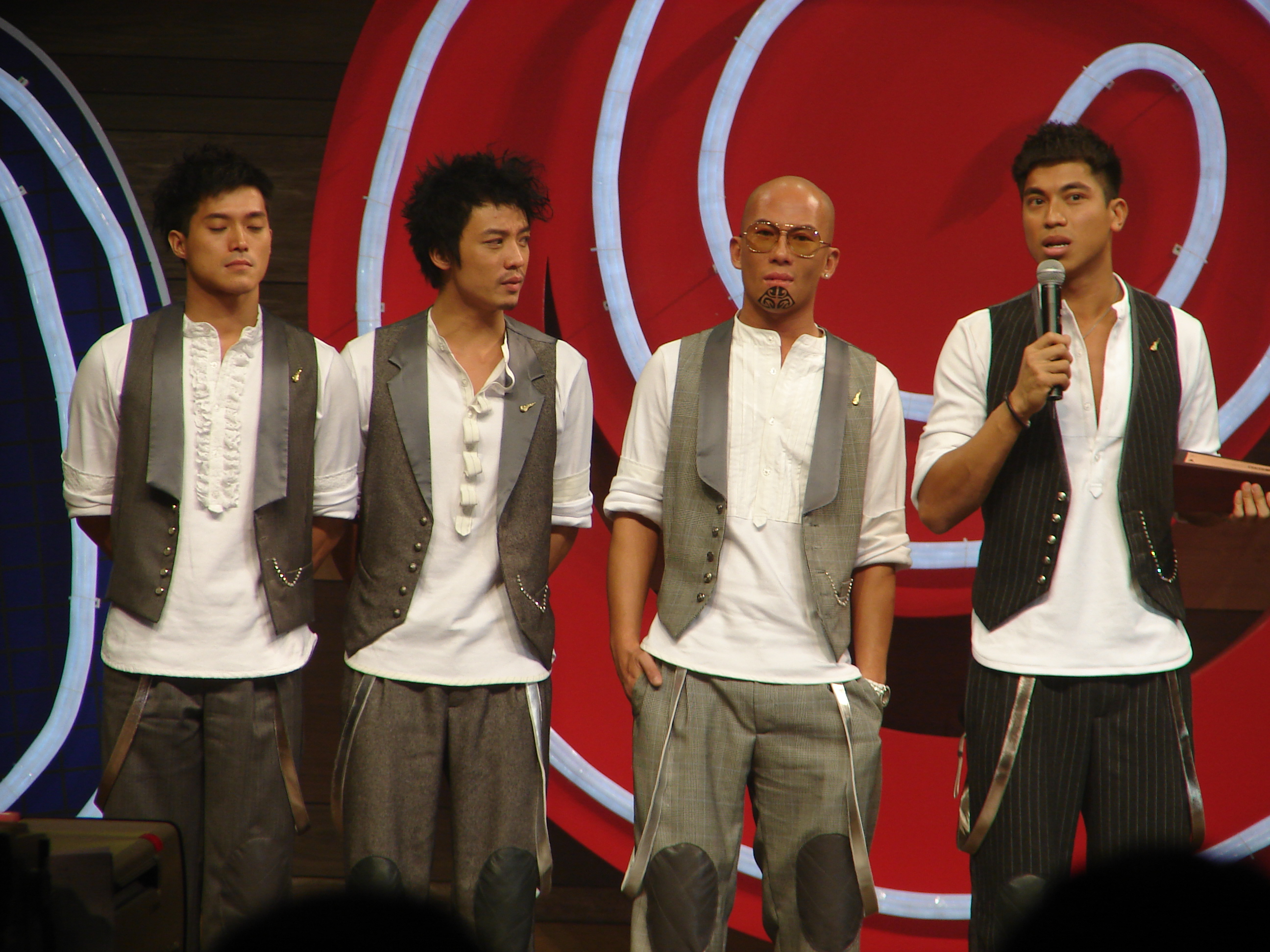
- Born: Hong Kong
- Occupations: Singers, dancers
- Years active: 2002-2013
- Musical career
- Origin: Hong Kong
- Genres: Cantopop
- Members: Osman Hung; Eric Tse; Eddie Pang; Otto Wong

EO2 was a Cantopop dance group in Hong Kong. The name comes from its 4 members with 2 beginning with "E", and 2 beginning with "O". The members are Eric Tse (謝凱榮), Eddie Pang (彭懷安), Osman Hung (洪智傑) and Otto Wong (王志安).

Hung starred in a Hong Kong movie called Permanent Residence in 2009, where he appeared as 'Windson', one of the two main characters. Unusually for a Hong Kong film, Hung stripped naked several times in the film, with his private parts fully revealed on camera in several scenes. He also appeared in the film Love Actually... Sucks! in 2011, where he appeared as 'Spider', and was again shown fully naked in several scenes. The group disbanded in October 2013.

== Albums ==
- EO2 Hangover
- Stand 4
- 004
- I know (我知道)
- Ladies' Nite

== TVB Series ==
- Super Trio Series

== Films ==
- New Option 2 - Undercover
- New Option 3 - Assault Team
- New Option 5 - Savior
- New Option 7 - Syndicate
