= The Wynners =

Hong Kong pop band

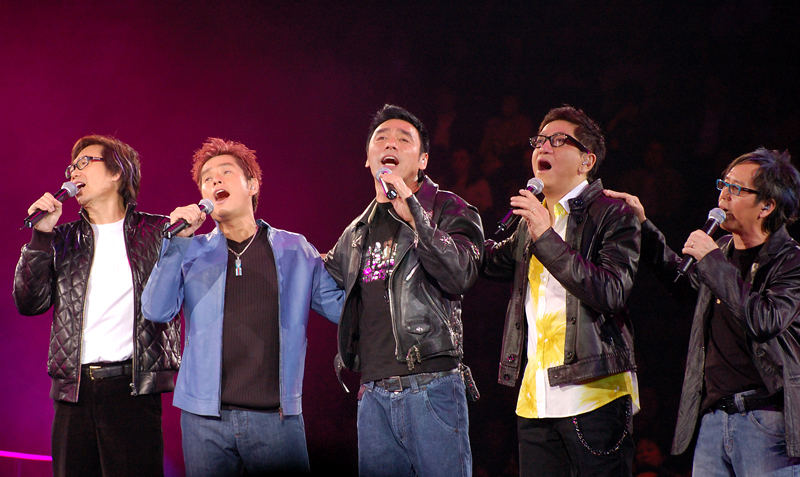
- The Wynners reunion in 2007

Background information
- Origin: Hong Kong
- Years active: 1973–2023 (intermittent reunions since the late 70s)

Chinese name
- Traditional Chinese: 溫拿
- Simplified Chinese: 温拿
Transcriptions
Standard Mandarin
- Hanyu Pinyin: wēn nā
Yue: Cantonese
- Jyutping: wan1 naa4
- Musical career
- Also known as: The Loosers (former name)
- Origin: Hong Kong
- Genres: Hong Kong English pop, Cantopop
- Labels: Philips, Polydor, Universal Music
- Members: Alan Tam; Kenny Bee; Bennett Pang; Danny Yip; Anthony Chan
- Past members: Natalis Chan; Chan Pak San

The Wynners are a Hong Kong pop band formed in the 1970s. The group consists of Alan Tam (lead vocals), Kenny Bee (lead vocals, rhythm guitar, keyboards), Bennett Pang (lead guitar), Danny Yip (bass), and Anthony Chan (drums).

== History ==
Beginning as a Hong Kong English pop band, The Wynners were assembled by manager Pato Leung in 1973 out of an earlier incarnation of the group, the Loosers. Bee, who was with the Sergeant Majors before joining the Wynners, was the only one not part of the original lineup.

The group soon became one of the most popular teen idol groups in Hong Kong at the time. The group's first studio album, Listen to the Wynners, released in 1974, was a commercial success. It included the Walkers' hit "Sha-La-La-La-La". The next albums were equally successful, such as the 1976 release Some Kind of Magic, which included hits such as "Save Your Kisses for Me", a cover of the 1976 Eurovision winner by British pop band Brotherhood of Man.

Their success in music was mirrored other forms of the popular media, including a television show on TVB, The Wynners Specials (1975), and three feature films, Let's Rock (1975), Gonna Get You (1976) and Making It (1978).

In 1978, members of the group went their separate ways to develop their solo careers. Alan Tam and Kenny Bee went on to become two of the most popular stars in Hong Kong in the 1980s.

Never formally disbanded, the Wynners have since reunited on stage every five years to sold-out crowds. On 1 April 2011, they reunited at the Artistes 311 Love Beyond Borders fundraising event set up by Jackie Chan in Hong Kong to help tsunami victims in Japan. They held a benefit concert for Family Bridges at the Oracle Arena on 8 November 2014.

In 2023, the Wynners announced their final concert in Hong Kong commemorating their 50th anniversary, and formally disbanded shortly after.

== Music ==
The group sang exclusively in English in their early days, mainly covers of popular songs from other parts of the world, most notably "Hey Jude" by the Beatles. In 1975, the group collaborated with songwriter/lyricist James Wong and released a number of original Cantonese songs for the soundtrack of the film Let's Rock, which Wong also directed. With lyrics in a light-hearted, colloquial style along the lines of those from Sam Hui, these songs defined the signature style of early Cantopop.

== Awards and honours ==
- RTHK Top 10 Gold Songs Awards
- 1988 RTHK Golden Needle Award

Awards
Preceded by Chen Dieyi	Golden Needle Award of RTHK Top Ten Chinese Gold Songs Award; 1988	Succeeded by Paula Tsui
