= Meini Cheung =

Hong Kong actress

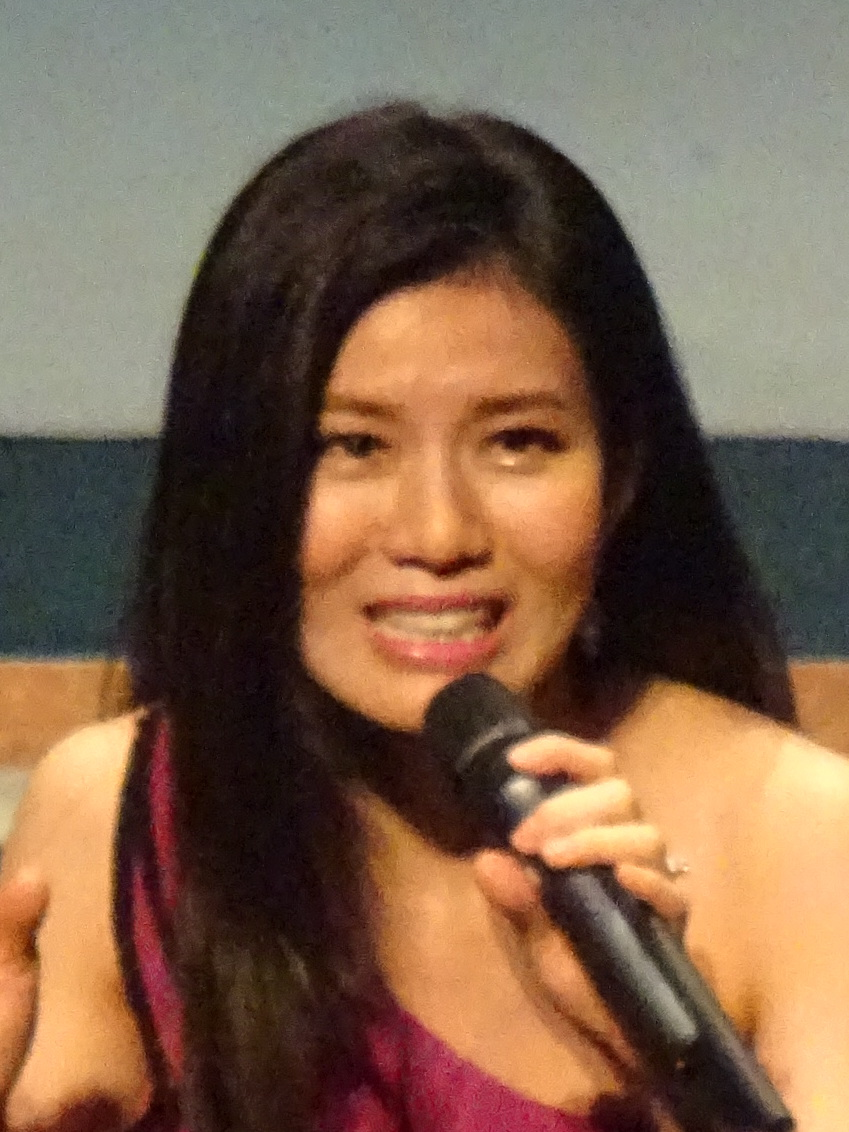
- Cheung in July 2016
- Born: 2 March 1980 (age 46); British Hong Kong
- Occupation: Actress

Chinese name
- Traditional Chinese: 張美妮
- Simplified Chinese: 张美妮
Transcriptions
Standard Mandarin
- Hanyu Pinyin: Zhāng Měinī

Meini Cheung (Chinese: 張美妮, born 2 March 1980) is a Hong Kong actress.

== Filmography ==
=== Television series ===
Year	English title	Original title	Role	Notes
2007	The Drive of Life	歲月風雲	Kong Man	
2008	Super Trio series	獎門人系列		
2009	Sweetness in the Salt	碧血鹽梟	Yin Yuet	
2010	Can't Buy Me Love	公主嫁到	Fong Hak-lan	
2010	Super Trio series	獎門人系列		
2011	Only You	只有您	Candy	
2011	The Other Truth	真相	Cecilia Wong	
2012	King Maker	造王者	Yip Yeuk-mei	
2012	The Confidant	六福晉	Sixth Princess Consort	
2013	Karma Rider	師父·明白了	Dong Mei	
2013	Reality Check	心路GPS	Wu Lai-fun	
2015	The Fixer	拆局專家	Chu Fung-yee	
2015	Every Step You Take	陪著你走	Sung Tin Chung	
2016	Inspector Gourmet	為食神探	Keira Tong	
2016	Speed of Life	鐵馬戰車	Siu Ying	
2018	Watch Out, Boss			
2018	Daddy Cool			
2018	OMG, Your Honour			
2019	Handmaidens United	丫鬟大聯盟	Ng Seong	
