= Fight and Smile =

Fundraising campaign in Taiwan

Fight and Smile (相信希望fight & smile賑災募款晚會) was a fund raising campaign held in Taiwan for the victims of the Japan 2011 Tōhoku earthquake and tsunami. The event was held from March 17 to March 18, 2011. About NT$788 million were raised by the event. The event was hosted by Jacky Wu, Chang Fei (張菲), Chang Hsiao-yen (張小燕) and Patty Hou.

== Participants ==
About 300 celebrities participated in the event, including:

- A-mei
- Stefanie Sun
- Jody Chiang
- Mike He
- Vivian Hsu
- Ken Chu
- Hui Xu-jie (許傑輝)
- Lu Chen (劉謙)
- Ella Chen
- Chie Tanaka
- Dee Shu
- Jerry Yan
- Wu Bai
- Fahrenheit
- Hidetoshi Nakata
- Pai Bing-bing
- Hsu Nai-lin (徐乃麟)
- Li Jing
- SMAP
- Wang Bun-yun (黃品源)
- Kay Huang (黃韻玲)
- Wang Wei-zhong (王偉忠)
- JJ Lin
- Blackie
- Van Fan
- Lin Chi-ling (from remote)
- Jolin Tsai (from remote)
- Jay Chou (from remote)
- Show Lo (from remote)
- Selina Ren (from remote)

== See also ==
- Artistes 311 Love Beyond Borders
