= Emotion Cheung =

Hong Kong artist (born 1965)

- 張炳強
- Born: December 20, 1965 (age 60); Hong Kong
- Occupation: Actor
- Years active: 1998–present
- Spouse: Zhang Yan (m. 2004)
- Children: 1

Emotion Cheung (Chinese: 張錦程; born December 20, 1965) is a Hong Kong male artist. His English name, Emotion, is a homophone of his Chinese name, "Kam-ching". He was active in Hong Kong stage plays, television and film industries in his early years, and later went to China to develop his acting career. He won the Hong Kong Drama Award for Best Actor twice for "Luv" (飛越愛河橋) and "The French Kiss" (法吻), and is the first Hong Kong best drama actor (劇帝). In addition, he was once a Hong Kong television artist.

== Early life ==
Cheung grew up in Block 3, Shek Lei Estate (石籬邨), Kwai Tsing District in his early years. (Note: 關於張錦程成長地、家庭背景、小學與中學母校以及洋名來源的資料出自香港電台第一台廣播節目《守下留情》於2017年9月11日播出的訪問。) During his secondary school years, he moved to Tsuen Wan District. He has three younger siblings and his father was a construction worker. (Note: 關於張錦程父親職業、中六肄業後去向、加入香港商業電台、入讀香港演藝學院經過、不報讀電視台藝員訓練班原因以及投身演藝界經過的資料出自香港電台第一台廣播節目《守下留情》於2017年9月13日播出的訪問。) In 1979, he studied at the afternoon school of S.K.H. Chu Oi Primary School (聖公會主愛小學). (Note: 關於張錦程就讀下午校、校園生活以及學業成績的資料出自香港電台第一台廣播節目《守下留情》於2017年9月12日播出的訪問。) He graduated from Lui Ming Choi Lutheran College (路德會呂明才中學) in 1984 in Form 5. His academic performance was average at school, but he managed to pass five subjects in the Hong Kong Certificate of Education Examination and was promoted to Form 6 at the same secondary school. However, he dropped out and did not take the Hong Kong Higher Level Examination because he was unable to cope with the amount of study material that needed to be memorized.

On the other hand, he showed his talent for drama in secondary school. He has participated in school drama activities since Form 2, mainly as a director, and is a member of the Boys' Brigade (基督少年軍). Cheung failed in his first application to the Hong Kong Academy for Performing Arts (香港演藝學院), so he spent several months working as an advertising agent for a business magazine, mainly lobbying clients to place advertisements. From the second half of 1985 to the first half of 1986, he recommended himself to the Hong Kong Commercial Radio as a program host and planning trainee, and was eventually accepted by Fung Chin-ping (馮展萍, a well-known radio drama announcer, producer and host). He received training from Amen Ng (伍曼儀), Terrence Wong Kwai-lam (黃桂林), James Fung Wai-tong (馮偉棠), Frankie Lo Wing Kwan (羅榮焜, aka 羅山). He once assisted in the recording of Eighteenth Floor Block C (十八樓C座) and created the sound effects behind the scenes. The rest of the time he dealt with program activities other than broadcasting. In 1986, he applied to the Academy of Performing Arts for the second time and was admitted as a student. The reason why he did not choose to apply for the TV station's artist training class was that he thought the training in the class was unorthodox.

== Career ==
Cheung completed the Advanced Diploma programme at the Hong Kong Academy for Performing Arts in 1990. His classmates included Sunny Chan (陳錦鴻), Jim Chim (詹瑞文), Emily Kwan (關寶慧), Jerry Ku (古明華), Joey Leung (梁榮忠), Rain Lau (劉玉翠). After graduating in 1990, he and Sap Sam Chan (陳十三) were hired by the Hong Kong Repertory Theatre (香港話劇團). However, because the salary at Asia Television (ATV) was more attractive, Cheung worked for ATV as an artist and left after his contract ended in 1993. At the same time, he became increasingly active in the stage drama industry. He founded the stage drama troupe "Acting Family" (演戲家族) in 1991. Before 2000, he served as a creator, actor, director and producer for the drama troupe. Just a few years after entering the industry, he won his first stage play award. In 1992, he won the Best Actor (Comedy/Farce) award at the first Hong Kong Drama Awards for his performance in Luv (飛越愛河橋; Luv is a play by Murray Schisgal). During the same period, he attended the dubbing class run by Lo Kwok Hung (盧國雄) and May Tse (謝月美), and thus he has voice acted in some dramas and movies, such as The Ghost Story (倩女幽魂) directed by Tsui Hark (徐克) and the Cantonese dub of the 1995 film Toy Story.

Cheung felt lost and confused during 1993 and 1994 and did not want to act. The he hosted a late-night program "Emotion Cheung For You" (張錦程俾哂你) on Metro Radio. (Note: 關於張錦程轉職新城電台原因、離開有線電視原因以及加入無綫電視經過的資料出自香港電台第一台廣播節目《守下留情》於2017年9月14日播出的訪問。) From 1994 to 1995, he worked for Hong Kong Cable Television and partnered with Miguel Choi (蔡康年) to host the cable YMC channel program "Youth People's Congress" (青年人民大會). At that time, the cable executives were reluctant to accept the innovative ideas he put forward on the show, which made Cheung frustrated. He used the live broadcast program to express his true feelings, his views on creation and his thoughts on the creative department executives, and was eventually kicked out of the company. The tapes of the relevant program clips were even used by cable TV as negative examples to train new employees.

In 1995, Cheung joined TVB under the encouragement and recommendation of Sunny Chan. In 2000, due to limited development opportunities and no salary adjustment, he signed with StarEast (東方魅力). During his time as a TVB artist, Cheung was involved in hosting and acting projects. He is best known for his ability to imitate characters in the variety show Enjoy Yourself Tonight (歡樂今宵), where he was appreciated by the then producer of the show, Chan Ka-lun (陳家倫), and joined the hosting team. (Note: 關於張錦程加入《歡樂今宵》和轉當經紀人原因的資料出自香港電台第一台廣播節目《守下留情》於2017年9月15日播出的訪問。) The opportunity to serve as a variety show host came from his own initiative, with the goal of reaching a wider audience. In addition to being active in the film industry, he also developed his personal career in China.

In 2000, he served as an instructor for the "Sweet Sweet Life" (甜美生活) actor training class jointly organized by Metro Radio and Breakthrough (突破機構). Later, he realized that he was not a first-line actor and his Mandarin was not good enough. He thought that he could avoid the embarrassing situation of disagreeing with producers by becoming a manager. Therefore, from 2003 to 2006, he served as the manager and drama and acting consultant of "Dong Shan Culture" (東山文化) which he co-founded with his friends. With the birth of his daughter, he needed to devote more time to his family, so he handed over the business to his partner and served as an art consultant for Beijing Yihe Xingguang Culture Agency (北京宜和星光文化經紀公司) from 2006 to 2014.

In the late 2000s, Cheung continued his studies and graduated with a Master of Fine Arts degree in Directing from the Hong Kong Academy of Performing Arts in 2011. In 2012, he won the Best Actor Award (Tragedy/Drama) at the 21st Hong Kong Drama Awards for his performance in the drama "The French Kiss". This is his second time winning the Best Actor award.

In 2016, he played the role of Fu Guosheng (傅國生) in the China online drama Yu Zui (余罪), which increased his popularity in the China market. In 2017, he and singer Lee Kin Tat (李健達) won the Chinese Golden Melody Award (華語金曲獎) for "Outstanding Dual Singing Song" (優秀合唱歌曲) for the song Good Friends (好朋友). He is currently the host of "Nam Yan Lo Gau" (男人老九) on Meme Hong Kong Online Radio and "20, 30, 40" on Channel 234. He has also acted in films and television shows in both Hong Kong and China.

Cheung and his partner Hanks trained actors for ViuTV's 2023 drama Left On Read (那年盛夏我們綻放如花) directed by Chan Kin-long. In the 8-class course, he shared his views on acting and life with students. Cheung believed that drama originated from life, so he liked to observe various details in daily life. He also told his students that "hard times create strong men. Strong men create good times. Good times create weak men. And, weak men create hard times." Cheung also plays the role of the school principal in the drama.

== Personal life ==
In 1996, Cheung met Zhang Yan (張延), a mainland Chinese actress and student who was sent by South China University of Technology to intern at TVB, through hosting the TVB travel program Walk Around China (繞着神州走). The two registered their marriage in Hong Kong in 2004 and have a daughter. The daughter’s godfather is director Tsui Hark (徐克).

In April 2021, Zhang returned to Hong Kong from abroad and was placed under compulsory quarantine at the Regal Airport Hotel. On the 5th of the same month, he was arrested for violating the quarantine order by leaving the quarantine room. He was soon sent to North Lantau Hospital and then transferred to the Penny's Bay Quarantine Camp (竹篙灣隔離營) for quarantine. Afterwards, he said that he needed fresh air to cope with his heart problems, so he asked the hotel staff to leave the room and rest in the hotel lobby.
