= Eighteenth Floor Block C =

Radio drama programme, Hong Kong, China

Eighteenth Floor Block C (Chinese: 十八樓C座) is a long-running radio drama programme of Commercial Radio Hong Kong's Channel 1. The programme was first broadcast on July 3, 1968, at 7:15 pm. The backdrop of the show is the fictitious 'Chow Kei's Cafe' (周記冰室) located in Wanchai. The protagonist is the owner of the cafe, ‘Boss Chow’, and along with his employees and regular customers, they offer their differing views and opinions on the various current affairs and social issues of Hong Kong in a friendly manner. In this way, the show serves as a microcosm of Hong Kong's society at large.

The broadcastings are recorded on the day of broadcast with the show covering the latest news and events taking place in Hong Kong and around the world. The schedule of the broadcast is on Mondays through Fridays from 12:36 - 1:00 pm, and has remained largely unchanged for decades. The show is repeated in the early hours the next day. The schedule tends to vary but as at March 2020, it runs during the 12:07 - 12:30 am time slot.

At first, the name Eighteenth Floor Block C came from the Hong Kong 1967 Leftist riot where Hong Kong Commercial Radio's anchor Lin Binsheng lived, in Waterloo Block D. Commercial Radio's founder George Ho (何佐芝) came up with the programme's name but when was asked how he simply said "I can't be bothered explaining" ("費事解")
