= Linda Wong (singer) =

Hong Kong singer

- 王馨平
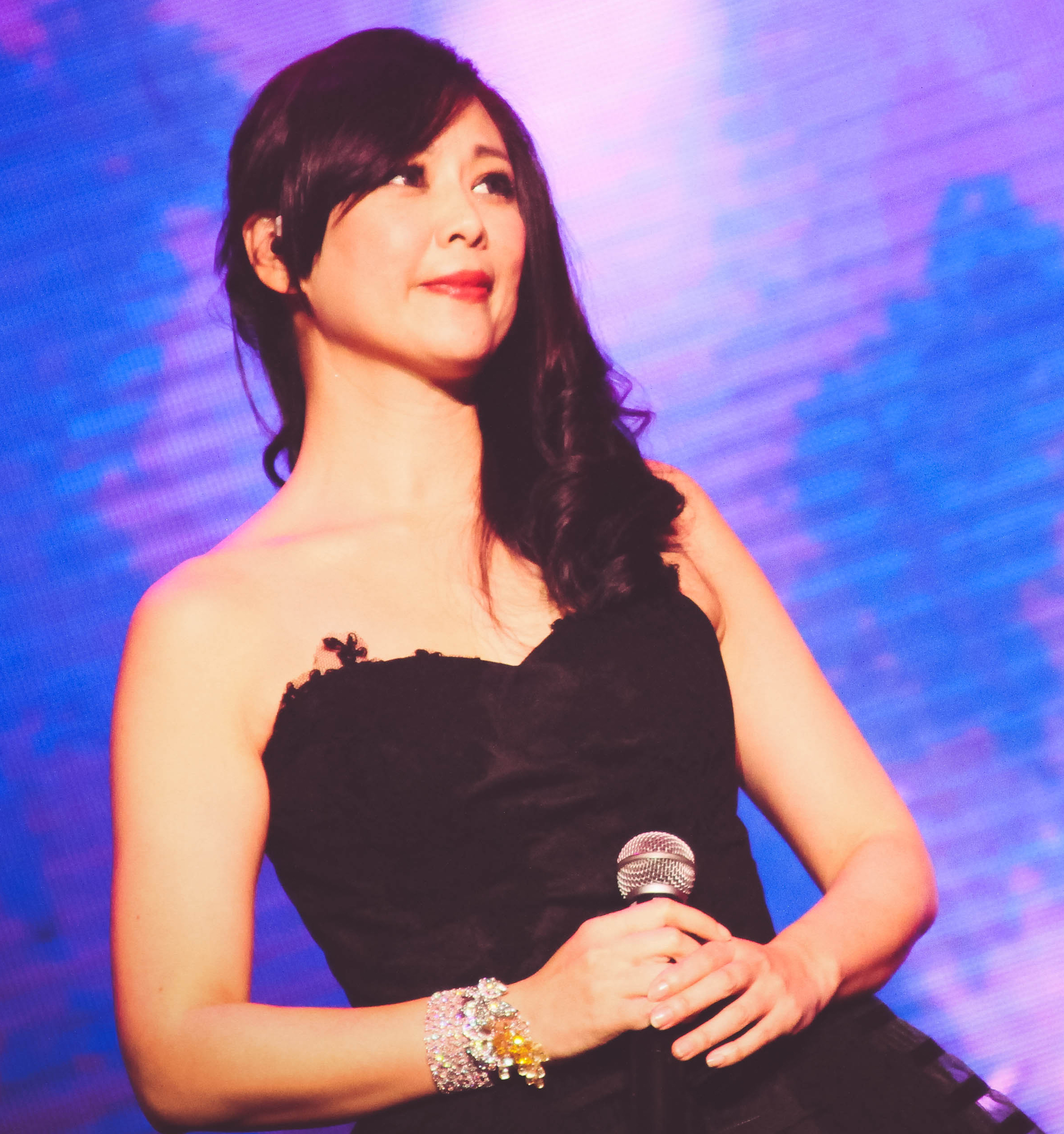
- Linda Wong in 2014
- Born: Wong Chuen-yam (王傳音); 5 August 1968 (age 57); British Hong Kong
- Occupation: Singer
- Years active: 1993–2001; 2013–present
- Spouse: Stephen Lee (m. 2001)
- Parent(s): Jimmy Wang Yu (father); Jeanette Lin Chui (mother)
- Musical career
- Origin: Hong Kong
- Genres: Cantopop; Mandopop
- Instrument: Vocals
- Label: PolyGram

Linda Wong Hing-ping (born 5 August 1968) is a Hong Kong singer who grew up in Taiwan. She was most active in the 1990s. Her most famous song is "Don't Ask Who I Am". She is also famous for reviving songs including Karl Keaton's "I Remember".

== Personal life ==
Wong's parents are Hong Kong actors Jimmy Wang Yu and Jeanette Lin Chui, also known as Lam Chui, Jeanette Lam Chui, Jeanette Lin, or Lin Tsui. Linda's uncle is Hong Kong actor Kenneth Tsang.

Wong graduated from the Affiliated Senior High School of National Taiwan Normal University and attended National Chengchi University, graduating with a degree in journalism, prior to her singing career. She is currently an entertainment writer for a Taiwanese newspaper.

== Discography ==
Albums
Cantonese

- 王馨平 (June 1993)
- 愛一生也不夠 (December 1993)
- 理想情人 (June 1994)
- 飛 (November 1994)
- 馨平個性 (August 1995)
- 着迷 (February 1996)
- Truly (2014)

Mandarin

- 別問我是誰 (October 1993)
- 一生癡戀 (1994)
- 織心 (1995)
- 受害者 (1996)
- 馨平氣和 (1996)
- 打碎心瓶 (1999)
- 馨情 (2011)

== Filmography ==
Television shows

- Below the Lion Rock (2015) as Elaine
