= Bennett Pang =

- Born: Pang Kin San; 7 April 1949 (age 77); Hong Kong
- Occupations: Musician; singer; songwriter; actor
- Years active: 1973–present

Chinese name
- Traditional Chinese: 彭健新
- Simplified Chinese: 彭健新
Transcriptions
- Musical career
- Genre: Cantopop
- Instruments: Vocals, guitar
- Member of: The Wynners

Bennett Pang Kin-san (Chinese: 彭健新; born 7 April 1949) is a Hong Kong musician, singer and actor. He is well known as the lead guitarist of The Wynners. He is currently a host of Pleasure & Leisure, a talk show produced by Television Broadcasts Limited.

== Filmography ==
Year	Title
1975	Let's Rock
1976	Gonna Get You
1978	Making It
1981	Lucky By Chance
1984	The Ghost Informer
1984	The Other Side of Gentleman
1985	City Hero
1985	Mummy Dearest
1986	100 Ways to Murder Your Wife
1986	My Will, I Will
1986	The Strange Bedfellow
1987	Armour of God
1988	In the Line of Duty III
1993	The Tigers - The Legend of Canton
1997	97 Aces Go Places
2006	We Are Family
2010	Fortune King Is Coming to Town!
2011	East Meets West
2011	I Love Hong Kong
2013	I Love Hong Kong 2013
