= Louisa So =

Hong Kong actress

- Born: 16 January 1968 (age 58); Hong Kong
- Spouse: Poon Chan Leung (m. 2020)

Chinese name
- Traditional Chinese: 蘇玉華
- Simplified Chinese: 苏玉华
Transcriptions
Standard Mandarin
- Hanyu Pinyin: Sū Yùhuā
Yue: Cantonese
- Jyutping: Sou^{1} Juk^{6} Waa^{4}
- Website: Louisa SO Yuk-wa's official website

Louisa So Yuk Wa (simplified Chinese: 苏玉华; traditional Chinese: 蘇玉華; pinyin: Sū Yùhuā; Born 16 January 1968 in Hong Kong) is a Hong Kong actress in drama and TV series. She is considered the "Cooking Mistress" of Hong Kong after winning the comedy cooking show Beautiful Cooking. In August 2009, she travelled by train across the United States, during which time she met Guardian journalist Douglas Rogers. After a brief break in 2009, she unexpectedly returned to acting in 2014 as the protagonist in the TVB drama Rear Mirror, a role that brought her wide critical acclaim, after the show received high viewership ratings.

== Personal life ==
In 2020, So tied the knot with her long-time partner Poon Chan Leung, a Hong Kong actor.

== Filmography ==
=== Television series ===
Year	Film	Role	Notes
1994	Journey of Love	Yuen Suk-kuen	
1995	Detective Investigation Files	Gigi Yung	
1995	Detective Investigation Files II	Gigi Yung	
1995	The Condor Heroes 95	Kung-suen Luk-ngok	
1995	A Kindred Spirit	Chan Wing-kam	
1995	The Criminal Investigator		
1996	One Good Turn Deserves Another	Chow Zi-san	
1996	Night Journey	Ding Siu-yuk	
1997	Dark Tales II		
1997	Journey to the West II	Eldest Fairy Xueliang	
1998	Moments of Endearment	Yeung Zan-nam	
1998	ICAC Investigators 1998	Shum Po-san	
1999	Anti-Crime Squad	Chow Nin-kiu	
1999	Road to Eternity	Lin-fa	
1999	Life for Life	Tsui Suk-ngo	
2000	Lost in Love	Tse Suk-mei	
2001	At Point Blank	Wan Yuen-yau	
2001	The Awakening Story	Susan Chiu Cheuk-lam	
2001	Colourful Life	Chow Mung-han	
2002	The Battle Against Evil	Sui Fu-yung/Fu-yung Sin-zi	
2003	Triumph in the Skies	Ruby Pui Ka-lo	
2005	Misleading Track	Yan Ting (Yen)	Warehoused and broadcast in 2005 Nominated - TVB Anniversary Award for Best Actress (Top 10)
2005	Guts of Man	Duen Dan-fung	Warehoused series
2006	Bar Bender	Chong Hiu-wai	
2006	Men in Pain	Wong Dak-kiu	
2007	Phoenix Rising	Yim Pui-Woo/Yeung Choi Yiu	Warehoused and broadcast in 2008
2008	Wasabi Mon Amour	Ko You-mei (Ah Me)	
2008	Best Selling Secrets (2008)	Lai Pong Yue-yuk	Guest Appearance
2009	The Winter Melon Tale	Chung Pik-yuk	
2009	A Bride for a Ride	Mo Sam-leung	
2013	The Hippocratic Crush II	Moon Sun Man-yuet	
2014	Rear Mirror	Anson Yiu Ngai-yan	Nominated - TVB Anniversary Award for Best Actress
2015	Lord of Shanghai	Cho Yuet-Lan	Nominated - TVB Anniversary Award for Best Actress
2018	The Forgotten Valley	Song Ming-Fung	

=== Drama ===
- 1989: Grease 油脂
- 1989: Such a Lovely Bastille Day 某一年的七月十四日
- 1989: Biloxi Blues 衝上雲霄
- 1989: The Normal Heart 常在我心間
- 1990: How to Succeed in Business without Really Trying 登龍有術
- 1990: Tin Hau - Goddess of Heaven 天后
- 1990: Goddess Kwun Yum and Virgin Maria 生觀音與瑪莉亞
- 1990: Terry Nova 光榮之旅
- 1991: One of the Lucky Ones (Re-run) 伴我同行(重演)
- 1991: Fou Lei & Fou Tsong 傅雷與傅聰
- 1991: The Government Inspector 欽差大臣
- 1991: Deadly Ecstasy 神火
- 1991: Orchards 情有獨鍾
- 1992: Nothing Scared 百無禁忌
- 1992: I Have a Date with Spring 我和春天有個約會
- 1992: Noises Off 蝦碌戲班
- 1992: A Flea in Her Ear 橫衝直撞偷錯情
- 1992: House of Blue Leaves 藍葉之屋
- 1992: M Butterfly 蝴蝶君
- 1993: M Butterfly (Re-run) 蝴蝶君
- 1993: I Have a Date with Spring (Re-run) 我和春天有個約會
- 1993: The Legend of the Mad Phoenix 南海十三郎
- 1993: King Lear 李爾王
- 1993: Guan Hanqing 關漢卿
- 1993: The Trial 審判
- 1994: Amadeus 莫札特之死
- 1994: Major Barbara 芭巴拉少校
- 1995: I Have a Date with Spring 我和春天有個約會
- 1996: That's Entertainment 播音情人
- 1997: The Mad Phoenix 南海十三郎
- 1997: That's Entertainment 播音情人
- 2000: Noises Off 蝦碌戲班
- 2002: Love in a Fallen City 新傾城之戀
- 2002: Between Life and Death 生死界
- 2003: A Serenade 寒江釣雪
- 2005: Superman Forever 你今日拯救o左地球未呀?
- 2005: Love in a Fallen City 05 新傾城之戀 05
- 2006: Love in a Fallen City 06 新傾城之戀 '06 傾情再遇
- 2007: The Peach Blossom Land 暗戀桃花源
- 2012: Rabbit Hole 心洞
- 2013: I Have a Date with Spring 我和春天有個約會（春天舞台重演版）
- 2013: The Mad Phoenix (Re-run) 南海十三郎（重演版）
- 2013: 18/F Block C 十八樓C座
- 2015: The Amahs 金蘭姐妹
- 2015: Into the Womb 胎內
- 2015: Le Dieu Du Carnage (Re-run) 狂揪夫妻 （重演）
- 2017: The Truth 謊言
- 2018: The Truth (Re-run) 謊言

=== Film ===
- 1994: I Have a Date with Spring 我和春天有個約會
- 1995: Paradise Hotel
- 1995: The Umbrella Story
- 1997 The Mad Phoenix 南海十三郎
- 2007: It's a Wonderful Life 心想事成
- 2018: Staycation
- 2022: The Sparring Partner

== Awards and nominations ==
Award	Year	Nominee / Work	Category	Result	Ref.
Hong Kong Film Award	2023	The Sparring Partner	Best Actress	Nominated	
