= Fiona Yuen =

German-born Hong Kong model and actress

- Born: January 20, 1976 (age 49); Cologne, West Germany
- Occupations: Model; actress

Fiona Yuen Choi Wan (simplified Chinese: 袁彩云; traditional Chinese: 袁彩雲; born 20 January 1976 in Cologne) is a German-born Hong Kong model and actress.

Yuen went to Hong Kong and took part in the 1996 Miss Hong Kong Pageant, where she was second runner-up and won the Miss International Goodwill award. She speaks German, French, English, Mandarin, Cantonese and Hakka fluently, for she is ancestrally of Dongguan Hakka origins although she is a Cantonese-speaking Hongkonger born in Germany. In 2010, it was announced that she would leave the entertainment and move to Vancouver to start a new life. She is currently under ATV Home, a local Hong Kong television station, as a host and program presenter.

== Television series ==
- A Kindred Spirit (1995)
- Rural Hero (1998)
- The Legend Of Lady Yang (2000)
- A Matter of Customs (2000)
- Crimson Sabre (2000)
- Healing Hands II (2000)
- Gods of Honour (2001)
- At Point Blank (2001)
- Lofty Waters Verdant Bow (2002)
- The 'W' Files (2003)
- Lofty Waters Verdant Bow (2003)
- The Vigilante in the Mask (2003)
- Fight for Love (2004)
- Love and Again (2004)
- Split Second (2004)
- Placebo Cure (2004)
- Always Ready (2005)
- Just Love (2005)
- Guts of Man (2005)
- Face to Fate (2006)
- ICAC Investigators 2007 (2007)
- The Ultimate Crime Fighter (2007)
- Last One Standing (2008)
- The Winter Melon Tale (2009)
- Man in Charge (2009)

Awards and achievements
Miss Hong Kong
| Preceded by Shirley Chau 周婉儀 | Miss Hong Kong 2nd Runner-Up; 1996 | Succeeded by Charmaine Sheh 佘詩曼 |
