= At Point Blank =

At Point Blank may refer to:

- At Point Blank (film), a 2003 Swedish action film
- At Point Blank (TV series), a Hong Kong romantic drama television series
