= ICAC Investigators 2007 =

Hong Kong television series

- Promo poster & DVD cover
- 廉政行動2007
- Genre: Crime, Police, Non-fiction
- Created by: Independent Commission Against Corruption (Hong Kong)
- Directed by: Ep.1 & 2: Alex Cheung; Ep.3:Dante Lam; Ep.4: Herman Yau; Ep.5: Joe Ma
- Starring: Ep.1: Louis Yuen, Sunny Chan, Kenny Wong, Fiona Yuen; Ep.2: Raymond Wong Ho-yin, Edmond Leung, Joe Junior, Kwan Shan; Ep.3: Law Kar-ying, Lily Li, Shirley Yeung, June Chan; Ep.4: Michael Miu, Ron Ng, Theresa Fu, Power Chan; Ep.5: Liu Kai-chi, Michelle Yim, Astrid Chan
- Composer: Pun Hon Wai
- Country of origin: Hong Kong
- Original language: Cantonese
- No. of episodes: 5

Production
- Producers: Tommy Leung, Lo Heung Lan
- Production location: Hong Kong
- Camera setup: Multi camera
- Running time: 45 minutes
- Production company: TVB

Original release
- Network: Jade; HD Jade
- Release: 1 September – 29 September 2007

Related
- ICAC Investigators 1996 (1996); ICAC Investigators 1998 (1998); ICAC Investigators 2000 (2000); ICAC Investigators 2004 (2004); ICAC Investigators 2009 (2009); ICAC Investigators 2011 (2011); ICAC Investigators 2014 (2014); ICAC Investigators 2016 (2016); ICAC Investigations 2019 (2019)

ICAC Investigators 2007
- Traditional Chinese: 廉政行動2007
- Simplified Chinese: 廉政行动2007
Transcriptions
Standard Mandarin
- Hanyu Pinyin: lián zhèng xíng dòng 2007
Yue: Cantonese
- Jyutping: lim4 zing3 haang4 dung6 2007

ICAC Investigators 2007 (Traditional Chinese: 廉政行動2007; literally "Upright Government Walk Movement 2007") (Chinese: 廉政行動2007; Jyutping: lim4 zing3 haang4 dung6 2007) is the 2007 installment of the ICAC Investigator series, produced by Hong Kong Independent Commission Against Corruption (ICAC) and TVB. It is broadcast on TVB Jade channel. Each criminal case is based on actual cases investigated by the ICAC.

== Cast and Synopsis ==
=== ICAC agents on multiple cases ===
- Danny Lee as Senior Chief Investigator Gan Sui Keung
- Astrid Chan as Investigator Michelle Wong
- Ko Chun Man as Investigator James Wong
- Mandy Lam as Investigator Mandy Wong
- Raymond Chiu as Investigator Michael Hui
- Gregory Lee as Investigator Frankie Kwok
- Augustine Lee as Investigator Paul Kwan
- June Chan as Investigator Jenny

=== Case #1: Prison Courier 鐵窗速遞 ===
Starring:

- Louis Yuen as Wong Yu Fai
- Sunny Chan as ICAC Investigator Sunny Leung
- Kenny Wong as Cheung Chun Hung
- Fiona Yuen as Ho Mei Yen
- Joseph Lee as Chu Sir

Wong Yu Fai (Louis Yuen) works as a prison guard. To fund his gambling problem he takes bribes and personal leisure gains from prisoners connection outside of prison in exchange for turning a blind eye when prisoners conduct illegal activity and also smuggling prohibited items for prisoners. Prisoner Cheung Chun Hung (Kenny Wong) employs Yu Fai's services in meeting up with his girlfriend Ho Mei Yen (Fiona Yuen) outside of prison for her to pass to Yu Fai personal items he wants. Yu Fai who is perverted sees it as an opportunity to make money and hopefully bed Mei Yen. The prison warden Chu Sir (Joseph Lee) informs ICAC Investigator Sunny Leung (Sunny Chan) of finding prohibited items in prisoners cell, he suspect one of his staff is passing items to prisoners and ask ICAC to investigate. ICAC eventually finds the connection between Yu Fai and Mei Yen. The prison warden has Yu Fai searched and finds a bag of illegal substance on him. With solid evidence on him Yu Fai is arrested by ICAC.

=== Case #2: Sand Dune Castle 沙丘城堡 ===
Starring:

- Raymond Wong Ho-yin as Leung Dik Wai
- Edmond Leung as Lai Chi Kit
- Joe Junior as School principal
- Law Lok Lam as Chan Lik Tou
- Kong Hon as ICAC Director

While inspecting the elevators of a newly built residential high rise an elevator inspector almost dies. The problem is brought to the attention of the heads of the construction corporation. One of the executive fesses up that the problem is not the elevator but the building itself because the foundations are not straight and the problem is the same with other buildings they have constructed. ICAC is asked to investigate, they tail the workers of the construction company. ICAC finds out that the building supervisor Leung Dik Wai (Raymond Wong) is never at the construction site but his signature on documents claimed he was. Lai Chi Kit (Edmond Leung) is another building supervisors, unlike Dik Wai, Chi Kit is hardworking. Their boss Chan Lik Tou (Law Lok Lam) tells Dik Wai he will promote him to head building supervisor but a loyal worker tells Lik Tou that he is making a mistake and Lik Tou promotes Chi Kit instead. Chi Kit has a hard time handling his new responsibility since he is dealt with a limited budget and time for completing constructions of the building. Dik Wai who resents Chi Kit uses this as an opportunity for Chi Kit downfall by suggesting to their boss on using a not compliance material to complete the building. Lik Tou who only cares about the budget agrees to Dik Wai's plan but they don't have enough budget to buy the material. Dik Wai steals Chi Kit's girlfriend in the process so Chi Kit hatches a revenge plan by suggesting the building foundation columns be filled with water which is dangerous and illegal, but Lik Tou agrees to it. Chi Kit guilt eventually gets the better of him and he quits his job, but ICAC arrest all of them.

Actual case: The episode is based on the 1999 "Short piling at Yuen Chau Kok" case. Certain pilings within the foundation of the buildings were found to be shorter than others. The buildings were ordered to be demolished.

=== Case #3: Hundred Of Millions Of Trust 億萬信用 ===
Starring:

- Law Kar-ying as Wong Lei Wah
- Lily Li as So Lai Man
- Shirley Yeung as ICAC Investigator Rachel Kong
- Rain Lau as Lee Sui Yen

Wong Lei Wah (Law Kar-ying) was a poor mainlander who enter into Hong Kong illegally during the 70's. Through hard work he makes his fortune in real-estate. During the 1997 Hong Kong stock market crash, to feel secure the banks ask that Lei Wah pay off his loan, he lets them know that once his business dealing comes through he will have the payment for them in full. He tells his business partner So Lai Man (Lily Li) about his situation, but she tells him she has to back out of their deal. He questions why and she tells him her identity was stolen by a friend who has applied for bankruptcy under her name. Lei Wah brings Lan Man to ICAC offices to report what happened. When ICAC further questions Lan Man about her case she tells ICAC that Lei Wah told her to lie to them in order to save himself from the banks and also that he is involved in illegal money laundering. With what Lai Man told ICAC, they decide to investigate Lei Wah. ICAC brings in Lei Wah's secretary for questioning, being pressured by ICAC she gives them another employee name. ICAC gains enough evidence to arrest Lei Wah, but employees of the bank and Lei Wah who originally promised to be witnesses for ICAC gives false testimony during the court hearing fearing they will lose their jobs. ICAC Investigator Rachel Kong (Shirley Yeung) convinces one of Lei Wah's employees Lee Sui Yen (Rain Lau) to be a truthful witness and Lei Wah is finally convicted.

=== Case #4: Pass The Boundary 過界 ===
Starring:

- Michael Miu as ICAC Chief Investigator Chan Gwok Wai
- Ron Ng as ICAC Investigator Pun Zin Gei
- Theresa Fu as ICAC Investigator Cheung Lei San
- Power Chan as Chin Ho Dong Sir
- Kara Hui as Choi Yut Ngo
- Kwok Fung as Wu Jen Wah
- Eric Li as Ho Chi Wai

Chin Ho Dong (Power Chan) is the Senior Superintendent of Hong Kong Police Narcotics Bureau. He is suspected of taking bribes and gains from former colleague Wu Jen Wah (Kwok Fung) and his wife Choi Yut Ngo (Kara Hui) in exchange for protection of their night club and hostess bar businesses. The ICAC spends two years trailing him to gather enough evidence to make an arrest, but with not enough evidence they are forced to release Ho Dong on bail. ICAC searches for the prostitutes that Yut Ngo had sent to service Ho Dong, most are afraid of offending Yut Ngo and refuse to be witnesses for ICAC. With one of the prostitutes willing to tell the truth ICAC is able to convict Ho Dong.

Actual case: The episode is based on 2003 ICAC case number CACC520/2003 and FACC14/2004.

=== Case #5: Empty Train 空卡 ===
Starring:

- Liu Kai-chi as Leung Chi Gin
- Michelle Yim as Lee Yut Guan
- Koo Ming Wah as Chow lap Yan
- Fire Lee as ICAC Investigator Roy
- Griselda Yeung as Linda

Leung Chi Gin (Liu Kai-chi) is a MTR train schedule manager. For money he helps mainlander Chow Lap Yan (Koo Ming Wah) smuggle illegal items on freight trains through the Hong Kong China border. He doesn't want to work for Lap Yan but is pressured into it because he is having an affair with Linda (Griselda Yeung) who works for Lap Yan. Undercover ICAC Investigator Roy (Fire Lee) questions why there is always an empty freight car on the train that passes through the border and reports it to the ICAC office. ICAC finds out that Chi Gin is the one that is scheduling reserved empty freight cars on trains that crosses the Hong Kong China border. ICAC finds evidence of illegal items being smuggled on the trains and arrest Chi Gin, but he pleads not guilty. While on bail his wife Lee Yut Guan (Michelle Yim) finds out about his affair and leaves him with their son. Linda helps Chi Gin to flee Hong Kong, on his way to the airport he finds a heartfelt letter from his son and decides to go to the train station to plead for his wife forgiveness. With his family forgiveness he realizes his wrong doings and pleads guilty.

Actual case: The episode is based on ICAC case number DCCC 1118/99, DCCC 817/2001.

== Ratings ==
Episodes	Date	Average Points
1	September 1, 2007	18
2	September 8, 2007	17
3	September 15, 2007	15
4	September 22, 2007	18
5	September 29, 2007	15
Average		16.6

== See also ==
- ICAC Investigators (TV series)
- Independent Commission Against Corruption (Hong Kong)

Before: Men Don't Cry: 26 February	TVB Jade Midnight rerun 2009; ICAC Investigators 2007; 27 February - 5 March; 12:05 am to 1:05 am	Next: Armed Reaction II; March 7 -
