= ICAC Investigators 2009 =

Hong Kong television series

- Promo poster & DVD cover
- 廉政行動2009
- Genre: Crime, Police, Non-fiction
- Created by: Independent Commission Against Corruption (Hong Kong)
- Written by: Ep.1: Jack Ng; Ep.2: Man Kuen, Yeung Hoi Nuen; Ep.3: Tse Yin Mei, Tang Wan Yin; Ep.4: Chau Ting; Ep.5: Pang Yuen Liang, Alex Chung
- Directed by: Ep.1: Dante Lam; Ep.2: Raymond Yip; Ep.3: Lawrence Lau; Ep.4: Herman Yau; Ep.5: Zhang Gwok Ming
- Starring: Ep.1: Bowie Lam, Jessica Hsuan, Kristal Tin, Vivien Yeo, Raymond Wong; Ep.2: Sonjia Kwok, Yoyo Mung, Halina Tam, Raymond Cho; Ep.3: Miriam Yeung, Pakho Chau, Kenny Wong; Ep.4: Maggie Siu, Raymond Wong, Joe Cheng; Ep.5: Andy Hui, Sammul Chan, Stephanie Cheng, Evergreen Mak, JJ Jia
- Theme music composer: Pun Hon Wai
- Country of origin: Hong Kong
- Original language: Cantonese
- No. of episodes: 5

Production
- Producers: Tommy Leung, Lo Heung Lan
- Production location: Hong Kong
- Camera setup: Multi camera
- Running time: 45 minutes
- Production company: TVB

Original release
- Network: Jade; HD Jade
- Release: 26 September – 24 October 2009

Related
- ICAC Investigators 1996 (1996); ICAC Investigators 1998 (1998); ICAC Investigators 2000 (2000); ICAC Investigators 2004 (2004); ICAC Investigators 2007 (2007); ICAC Investigators 2011 (2011); ICAC Investigators 2014 (2014); ICAC Investigators 2016 (2016); ICAC Investigations 2019 (2019)

ICAC Investigators 2009
- Traditional Chinese: 廉政行動2009
- Simplified Chinese: 廉政行动2009
Transcriptions
Standard Mandarin
- Hanyu Pinyin: lián zhèng xíng dòng 2009
Yue: Cantonese
- Jyutping: lim4 zing3 haang4 dung6 2009

ICAC Investigators 2009 (Traditional Chinese: 廉政行動2009; literally "Upright Government Walk Movement 2009") (Chinese: 廉政行動2009; Jyutping: lim4 zing3 haang4 dung6 2009) is the 2009 installment of the ICAC Investigator series, produced by Hong Kong Independent Commission Against Corruption (ICAC) and TVB. It is broadcast on TVB Jade channel. Each criminal case is based on actual cases investigated by the ICAC.

== Cast and Synopsis ==
=== Case #1: Rigged Market (造市) ===
Starring:

- Bowie Lam as Ma Yat Ming 馬日明
- Jessica Hsuan as ICAC Senior Investigator Kwok Yut Man 郭悅文
- Kristal Tin as Lam Bo Kei 林貝琪
- Vivien Yeo as Ho Lai Man 何麗文
- Raymond Wong as ICAC Investigator Henry Leung Pak Wah 梁柏華
- Ellesmere Choi as Wong Hoi 黄海
- Lau Kong as Lam Man Sum 林萬森 - Lam Bo Kei's father
- Irene Wong as Wong Hoi's wife
- Kaki Leung as Leung Han Ka 梁杏嘉
- Lam King Kong as Rocky - Ma Yat Ming's employee
- Ko Jun Man as Cheung Leut Si 张律師 - Ma Yat Ming's lawyer

"Young tycoons, stock talents takes advantage of the market by manipulating and deceiving their shareholders, causing themselves to end up behind bars."

Ma Yat Ming (Bowie Lam) puts his wife Lam Bo Kei (Kristal Tin) name as the chairman of his company. He plots with stock analyst Wong Hoi (Ellesmere Choi) and finance manager Ho Lai Man (Vivien Yeo), they spread false information about how stable his company is to raise the stock prices of his company. Yat Ming's wife Bo Kei discovers that the company was being investigated by ICAC and quickly fled Hong Kong to avoid being arrested and serving prison time. To avoid punishment, Wong Hoi commits suicide by jumping off a building. Bo Kei finds out her husband and Ho Lai Man were having an affair while she was on the run and decides to return to Hong Kong to surrender. Yat Ming scared that his wife would turn on him when she surrenders to ICAC, attempts to murder her. ICAC finds out and hope that they are able to track down Bo Kei before her husband Yat Ming finds her. In the end, ICAC is able to arrest Lam Bo Kei first, but more compelling they find evidence of Yat Ming and Lai Man's secret transaction of stolen goods.

=== Case #2: Nails (釘子戶) ===
Starring:

- Sonjia Kwok as Fong Tze Chuen 方子荃 (阿荃)
- Yoyo Mung as Zoe Chu Ji Yun 趙芷璇
- Halina Tam as Rainy Lam Yeuk Sui 林若水
- Raymond Cho as Lee Chi Lun 李子倫 - Chu Ji Yun's boyfriend
- Fiona Sit as ICAC Investigator Hui Kei San 許其珊
- Raymond Wong as ICAC Investigator Henry Leung Pak Wah 梁柏華
- Derek Kwok as Tong Wing Kin 唐永健 - Fong Tze Chuen's husband
- Chan Wing Kei as Chu Ji Yun's father
- Kitty Lau as Chu Ji Yun's mother

"Whether for love or profit, greed could be destructive to individuals who were originally living through a happy life."

Fong Tze Chuen (Sonjia Kwok), Zoe (Yoyo Mung) and Rainy (Halina Tam) are best friends since high school. Chuen's family suffers a misfortunes, Rainy helps Chuen by bribing Zeo's boyfriend Lee Chi Lun (Raymond Cho) for information on urban renewal buildings in advance. Rainy took advantage of the situation and came up with a compensation fraud idea to help Chuen get through the hardships. This left Zoe and Chi Lun who has been together for 7 years broke and no savings for their marriage plan. When Rainy offers a huge sum of money to Chi Lun, he agrees to collaborate with her scheme. All 3 plan accordingly and eye on the compensation to roll in. Unexpectedly, ICAC received complaints about the fraudulent scheme and eventually arrested them.

=== Case #3: Maintenance Predators (維修大鱷) ===
Starring:

- Lam Suet as Lau Gau 劉九
- Miriam Yeung as ICAC Investigator Mitilda Yeung Mei Kei 楊美琪
- Pakho Chau as ICAC Investigator Kenny 周栢堅
- Kenny Wong as Lam Gong Yiu 林光耀

Lam Gong Yiu (Kenny Wong) works as a building consultant who is in charge of assigning building projects to construction companies. He is suspected of taking bribes, but what shocks ICAC is Gong Yiu not only takes bribes from the construction companies but he also cancels the contract halfway through construction of the project causing the construction companies to lose money. ICAC Investigator Kenny (Pakho Chau) rash behavior during investigating Gong Yiu almost blows the case and he gets assigned to desk duty. The ICAC suspects Lau Gau (Lam Suet) another building consultant of doing the same. They decide to tale him. During a conversation with ICAC Investigator Mitilda Yeung (Miriam Yeung) he reevaluates himself and understands what he did wrong. Lau Gau daughter Karen, a recent college graduate starts working with him. She soon discovers her dad dirty dealings. When Lau Gau is arrested by ICAC he tries to deny his charges but seeing his daughter disappointed in him he finally confesses.

=== Case #4: Death Insurance (死亡保險) ===
Starring:

- Maggie Shiu as ICAC Investigator Carrie Lam Ga Lei 林嘉利
- Raymond Wong as ICAC Investigator Henry Leung Pak Wah 梁柏華
- Joe Cheung as ICAC Investigator Chui On 徐安
- Fiona Sit as ICAC Investigator Hui Kei San 許其珊
- Johnny Tang as Chan Jung Man 陳仲文
- Kate Tsang as Chan Siu Kui 陳水嬌

"Magic reaches a higher level. No evidence for the death, but still the ICAC investigators detected the fraud and bribery."

Chan Jung Man (Johnny Tang) is an insurance salesman. He buys a life insurance policy in Hong Kong for his sister Chan Siu Kui (Kate Tsang) who lives in Mainland China; however, he is the sole beneficiary of the plan. Three months later he tries to collect from the insurance company, claiming his sister in the Mainland has died when she was struck by lightning and that her body was burned and buried. The insurance company felt unfortunate, but he was suspected of broker fraud and bribery of the premium and was arrested by ICAC. The ICAC team had to race through 48 hours to crack the case before Chan Jung Man could collect on the life insurance. Working with Mainland authorities, they were able to solve the case in time.

=== Case #5: Public . Private . Car (公.私.車) ===
Starring:

- Andy Hui as ICAC Investigator Cheung Ji Fung 張誌鋒
- Sammul Chan as ICAC Investigator Chan Kar-Ming 陳嘉明
- Stephanie Cheng as Ah V Lei Nga Wai 李雅惠
- Evergreen Mak Cheung-ching as Mok Yau Kuen 莫有權
- Louis Yuen as Wong Hou Nam 王浩南
- JJ Jia as YoYo
- Angelina Lo as Ah V’s mother
- Stephen Huynh as Jason

"The greater the power, the greater the responsibility. But those in power could eventually abuse their power for personal benefits."

Electrical and Mechanical Service Department's Mok Yau Kuen (Evergreen Mak) receives a contract from engineering companies to provide free shuttle services to several government buildings for government workers and he was also in charge of maintenance checks for the vehicles. However he took advantage of his position and used the shuttles vehicles for personal uses, to drive his girlfriends around for leisure. He would also often accept bribes from companies offering him luxury entertainment. Eventually the ICAC was tipped off of his dealings and he was sentenced to prison.

== Award nominations ==
TVB Anniversary Awards (2009)

- Most Improved Actor Raymond Wong

== Viewership ratings ==
	Week	Episode	Average Points	Peaking Points	References
0	September 19, 2009	Making of ICAC	16	—	
1	September 26, 2009	1	21	—	
2	October 3, 2009	2	20	—	
3	October 10, 2009	3	24	—	
4	October 17, 2009	4	22	—	
5	October 24, 2009	5	21	—	

== See also ==
- ICAC Investigators (TV series)
- Independent Commission Against Corruption (Hong Kong)
