= Ellesmere Choi =

Hong Kong actor

- Born: Choi Ka Yeung 蔡嘉揚; 28 December 1968 (age 56); British Hong Kong
- Occupation: television actor
- Years active: 1994-present

Chinese name
- Traditional Chinese: 蔡子健
- Simplified Chinese: 蔡子健
Transcriptions
Standard Mandarin
- Hanyu Pinyin: Cài Zǐjiàn
Yue: Cantonese
- Jyutping: Coi3 Zi2 Gin6

Ellesmere Choi Chi-Kin (Chinese: 蔡子健; born December 28, 1968) is a former Hong Kong TVB actor.

Choi Chi Kin grew up in Ho Man Tin Estate, Kowloon in his early years. He attended Chan Sui Ki (La Salle) College in secondary school. In 1993, he joined the 6th Artist Training Course of the TVB Artist Training Course and later served as the host of children's programs. He is known as the "Prince of Travel" because of his participation in many travel programs. He spent his spare time studying at the Open University of Hong Kong and within 12 years. he completed the Bachelor's degree in Business Administration in International Business in 2006, the Master's degree in Business Administration in 1999, and the Doctor of Philosophy in Business Administration in 2008.

Currently, he has obtained the qualifications of CFP (Certified Financial Planner & Chartered Financial Planner), Approved Retirement Consultant and Life Insurance Manager.

== Filmography ==
=== TV Series (TVB) ===
Year	Title	Role	Remarks
1993	Love Is Hope III		
1993	Mind Our Own Business		
1994	Fate of the Clairvoyant	洪文揚	
1995	Journey of Love	俊朋友	
1997	Detective Investigation Files III	Poon Chi Tou [Psychologist]	Support Role
1999	Untraceable Evidence II	王英傑	
1999	Game of Deceit	嘉慶皇帝	
2000	The Kung Fu Master	Emperor Hong Hei	Support Role
2000	The Legendary Four Aces	Emperor Jing Duk	Support Role
2001	Colourful Life	馮太生	
2001	Armed Reaction III	榮兆佳	Support Role
2001	Seven Sisters	黃文迪	
2001	The Awakening Story	Chan Wing Lok	Support Role
2001	Virtues of Harmony	Bak Wan	Cameo Guest Role
2002	Burning Flame II	Lam Chui Yin	Support Role
2002	Take My Word For It	Yeung Hau Mo	Support Role
2003	Back to Square One	Seung Ho Yan	Support Role
2003	Witness to a Prosecution II	Kit Siu	Main Role
2003	Perish in the Name of Love	Jue Chi Chiu	Support Role
2003	Ups and Downs in the Sea of Love	Jacky	Guest Role
2003	The 'W' Files	Lam Chi Yuen / Lam Bak Chun	Support Role
2003	Not Just a Pretty Face	王國豪	
2003	Virtues of Harmony II	賈鎮南 (Sam)	Cameo Guest Role
2003	Seed of Hope	Ho Jun Yin	Support Role
2003	Triumph in the Skies	Mr. Yu	Guest Role
2004	Twin of Brothers	Dok Gu Chak	Support Role
2005	Hidden Treasure	Sing Dai Tzi	Main Role Third male lead
2005	The Gateau Affairs	Robert	
2005	Women on the Run	Go Wai Ho	Guest Role Episode 02
2005	Revolving Doors of Vengeance	Wong Kai Chi	Support Role
2005	The Zone	表姨丈	Unit Characters Episode 19: Revenge
2006	Love Guaranteed	佐 治	
2006	Trimming Success	Vincent	
2006	Forensic Heroes	So Chi Man	Guest Role
2006	C.I.B. Files	趙偉倫	
2007	Ten Brothers	Chow Ka Lai	Support Role
2007	War and Destiny	Lee Shing Hong	Support Role
2007	On the First Beat	Kwok Kai Chui	Support Role
2007	The Drive of Life	Ng Zhi Ming	Support Role TVB-CCTV co-production
2008	The Master of Tai Chi	Chai Yee Huk Yeung	Support Role
2008	The Money-Maker Recipe	Ding Siu Tim	Support Role
2008	Legend of the Demigods	河 伯	
2008	Last One Standing	Yeung Kin Yip	Support Role
2009	E.U. (Emergency Unit)	Kwok Kai Chiu	Support Role Special Performances
2009	The Winter Melon Tale	Wut Gei	Support Role
2009	The Threshold of a Persona	Roy	
2010	In the Eye of the Beholder	Biu	Support Role
2011	A Great Way to Care	Chan Kwong Loeng (Brian)	Support Role
2011	Police Station No. 7	陸天朗	Overseas release in April 2002
2013	The Slicing of the Demon	Lau Hoi-Fuk	Support Role Overseas release in March 2007

- His True Father (2009)
- The King of Snooker (2009)
- ICAC Investigators 2009 (2009)
- Below the Lion Rock (2006)

=== Program Host (TVB) ===
- 1993-1997：閃電傳真機
- 1996-1997：香港傳奇
- 1997：回歸快訊
- 1997-1998：旅遊新·特·搜
- 1998：旅遊大搜索
- 1998：地球大搜索
- 1999：再創高峰
- 2000：永安旅遊帶你嘆世界
- 2000：潮汕知識萬里行
- 2003：智趣相投總廚有請
- 2004：加拿大加倍開心之旅
- 2005：娛樂直播
- 2008：創富坊
