= Just Love =

- Just Love poster
- 老婆大人
- Genre: Modern Drama
- Starring: Jessica Hsuan; Sunny Chan; Dave Wong; Patrick Tang; Johnson Lee; Fiona Yuen; Selena Li; Natalie Tong
- Country of origin: Hong Kong
- Original language: Cantonese
- No. of episodes: 20

Production
- Running time: 45 minutes (approx.)

Original release
- Network: TVB
- Release: May 9 – June 3, 2005

Related
- Just Love II (2009)

Just Love (Traditional Chinese: 老婆大人) is a TVB modern drama series broadcast in May 2005. The drama was broadcast in Singapore's MediaCorp TV Channel 8 in 2007.

Play of family background, surrounded mainly scratching between husband and wife relationship, trust and support. Diverse work and affairs, and need to be difficult to care for their children because their parents have to face the family encountered feelings and confused ...

A direct sequel, Just Love II (老婆大人II) was produced and is released in 2009 continued with Jessica Hsuan, Sunny Chan, Natalie Tong, Patrick Tang, and Selena Li, alongside Joyce Tang.

== Synopsis ==
Lawful Woman:
Blind-folded so that she cannot see who she is condemning, representing equality.
A scale in her left hand to represent fairness.
A sword in her right hand to represent righteousness and justice.

Ko Hei Man (Jessica Hsuan) is a court judge that takes her work very seriously. She believes everyone is equal before the law and judges each and every case as justly and fairly as she can. Kot Kwok Kwong (Sunny Chan) is Man's supportive husband who obediently takes care of the household duties and their son. The couple first met in England, and after a one-night stand, Man discovers she is pregnant. Kwong takes full responsibility for the baby, but the couple is left wondering if marriage was the right decision.

Kwong's sexist and old-fashioned father objects to his son's ways of always listening to his wife. He believes Kwong needs to focus on work, while Man should learn to be a house-wife. These old fashioned ways is what drove his daughter, Kot Bo-Yee (Natalie Tong), to leave home. Bo-Yee suddenly returns to Hong Kong after studying in America and Kwong soon finds out that Bo-Yee was expelled from America for charges of violence. Trying to hide from her father, Man sends Bo-Yee to go live with Dai Ji-Hung (Dave Wong), Man's ex-boyfriend. Dai Ji-Hung still has feelings for Man that he can't put down, so Bo-Yee takes it upon herself to make Hung fall in love with her instead.

Man and Kwong face many obstacles in their marriage, mainly due to Man's stubbornness and Kwong's foolishness. Man turns to Leung Sin-Sin (Selena Li), prosecuting lawyer, and yoga instructor Lo Wing-See (Fiona Yuen) for advice. Sin believes that in a marriage, there is no right and wrong and that Man and Kwong need to learn to compromise. See, however, believes that all men in the world are jerks. Meanwhile, Kwong seeks advice from So Ah-Gei (Patrick Tang), defense lawyer, and his "manly" uncle, Kot Tak Wan (Johnson Lee). Both of them tell Kwong that he needs to man up and show his wife who's in charge.

How will the couples of Man and Kwong, Sin and Gei, See and Wan, and Bo-Yee and Ji-Hung learn to work out their differences?

== Cast ==
Cast	Role	Description
Jessica Hsuan	Ko Hei-Man 高希敏	Judge; Kot Kwok-Kwong's wife. Dai Ji-Hung's ex-girlfriend.
Sunny Chan	Kot Kwok-Kwong 葛國光	Ko Hei-Man's husband. Kot Bo-Yee and Kot Bo-Pui's older brother.
Natalie Tong	Kot Bo-Yee (Bowie) 葛寶怡	Kot Kwok-Kwong and Kot Bo-Pui's sister. Dai Ji Hung's girlfriend
Dave Wong	Dai Ji-Hung 戴智雄	Judge; Ko Hei-Man's ex-boyfriend. Kot Bo Yee's boyfriend.
Patrick Tang (鄧健泓)	So Ah-Gei (AK) 蘇亞基	Lawyer; Leung Sin-Sin's boyfriend.
Johnson Lee (李思捷)	Kot Dak-Wan (Vincent) 葛德雲	Kot Kwok-Kwong's uncle. Lo Wing-See's lover.
Fiona Yuen	Lo Wing-See (Vinci) 魯詠詩	Yoga Instructor; Kot Dak-Wan's lover.
Selena Li	Leung Sin-Sin (Yoyo) 梁昕昕	Lawyer; So Ah-Gei's girlfriend.
Lo Hoi Pang (盧海鵬)	Lo Wing-See 魯詠詩	Kot Kwok-Kwok, Kot Bo-Yee, and Kot Bo-Pui's father.
Lui Shan (呂珊)	Chung Jan-Ying 鍾綻英	Kot Kwok-Kwok, Kot Bo-Yee, and Kot Bo-Pui's mother.
Casper Chan (陳凱怡)	Kot Bo-Pui 葛寶貝	Kot Kwow-Kwong's younger sister.
Felix Lok (駱應鈞)	Ko Tin 高天	Ko Hei-Man's father. Yip Wai-Kuen's ex-husband. Debbie's boyfriend.
Chan Ka Yee (陳嘉儀)	Yip Wai-Kuen (Debbie) 葉惠娟	Ko Hei-Man's mother. Ko Tin's ex-wife.
Natalie Wong	Debbie	Ko Tin's girlfriend.
