= Rear Mirror =

Hong Kong television series

- Official poster
- Also known as: Time for Marriage 男大當婚
- 載得有情人
- Genre: Modern, Romance
- Created by: Hong Kong Television Broadcasts Limited
- Written by: Ko Wai Man 高慧敏; Tan Chui Shan 譚翠珊; Teng Si Ting 鄧斯婷; Leung Kin Heng 梁健恒; Siew Kok Wah 蕭國華; Cheung Ki Rong 張啟榮; Chan Siu Cheung 陳兆祥
- Directed by: Ng Siu Rong 伍兆榮; Zheng Yong Chiu 鄭永潮; Kwok Kar Hee 郭家禧; Chan Xiang Qun 陳湘娟; Lam Wai Cheng 林瑋澄; Leung Yiu Kin 梁耀堅
- Starring: Wayne Lai; Louisa So; Tony Hung; Natalie Tong; Chung King-fai; Lau Kong; Susan Tse; Mary Hon
- Opening theme: Out of My League (高攀) by Hubert Wu
- Country of origin: Hong Kong
- Original language: Cantonese
- No. of episodes: 20

Production
- Producer: Fong Chun-Chiu 方駿釗
- Production location: Hong Kong
- Editor: Wong Yuk-Dek 黃育德
- Camera setup: Multi camera
- Running time: 45 minutes
- Production company: TVB

Original release
- Network: Jade; HD Jade
- Release: 11 August – 5 September 2014

Related
- Ghost Dragon of Cold Mountain; All That Is Bitter Is Sweet

Rear Mirror:
- Traditional Chinese: 載得有情人
- Simplified Chinese: 载得有情人
- Literal meaning: "Have a Transportation Lover"
Transcriptions
Standard Mandarin
- Hanyu Pinyin: Zài dé yǒu qíng rén
Yue: Cantonese
- Jyutping: zoi2 dak1 jau5 cing4 jan4

Rear Mirror (Traditional Chinese: 載得有情人; literally "Have a Transportation Lover") was a 2014 Hong Kong modern romance serial drama produced by TVB which starred Wayne Lai, Louisa So, Tony Hung and Natalie Tong as the main leads. The series aired from Monday to Friday and started on August 11, 2014 on TVB's Jade channel during its 8:30 - 9:30 p.m. timeslot ending September 5, 2014 after 20 episodes total.

Rear Mirror is Wayne Lai and Louisa So's first collaboration in over 10 years.

== Synopsis ==
A single father who works as a mini bus driver that struggles to raise his young son with a severe food allergy problem alone, meets a female CEO of a huge corporation who seems to have it all on the outside but has struggles of her own due to her father's illness and family members fighting with each other for the CEO position.

== Storylines ==
Rear Mirror focuses on Anson Yiu Ngai Yan, appointed acting CEO of Yiu Gong after her father (Yiu Siu Bong) was taken ill, consolidating her position as CEO and winning over her family. Her increasingly perilous driving soon forces her to search for a driver, and Sunday Kei Yat Sing is soon appointed as her driver, being headhunted by Anson, with a promise of a place at a good school for his son, Kei Mong, who has numerous allergies and whom Sunday as raised alone for six years after his wife, Miu Man Yee, left him due to the difficulty of raising Mong. Anson soon restructures the company, but is at loggerheads with her fiancé, Bevis Fong Tin Hang, who wants her to leave Hong Kong and start a new life with him in New Zealand. She initially postpones the wedding for six months, but after that, Bevis gives her an ultimatum- it's work or him. Anson realises that she has no choice but to leave Bevis. Just weeks later, she bumps into Bevis and his new girlfriend, causing much stress. She becomes much more attached both to Sunday, her driver, and her pet dog MoMo, who Elaine Fong Yi Lin, her step-mother, uses to challenge Anson. Anson soon realises her step-brother, Jason Yiu Ngai Chung's potential and sends him off on projects across the country, which Elaine mistakenly believes to be a sign that Anson is trying to get rid of him, as he was one of the other contenders to be CEO. However, when Elaine decides to finally challenge Anson at a board meeting, she is soon shocked as that very meeting, Anson soon declares her stepbrother Jason as full of potential and sends him off on Yiu Gong's biggest project, much to Gu Suk Yin, her other step-mother's annoyance as she wanted her son, Ryan Yiu Ngai Suan, the playboy of the company to take that project. Sunday and Anson soon bond and they decide to make a picture book together, with all profits going to a charity supporting those with allergies, taking into use Sunday's photography hobby and Anson's memory of bedtime stories she was told of as a young child. Within Yiu Gong, however, Yiu Siu Wing, Bong's brother repeatedly challenges Bong's investment in the Clean Water Project, calling it a scam, but Anson continues the investment, as it is what Bong wanted her to do. This eventually leads up to Yiu Siu Wing refusing to allow any more investment in the project through his financial department. This makes Bong leave the hospital just to force a vote which results in Yiu Siu Wing leaving the company.

Later, Miu Man Yee, Sunday's ex-wife returns and takes Kei Mong, wins custody in a court battle, but Kei Mong has to be forced to go leaving Miu Man Yee guilty over her actions. She reveals where Ben Shum Bok Man is heading to Anson, who speaks to Ben and Sunday wins back custody of Kei Mong. Ben asks Anson in return to lend him 5% of her shares in Yiu Gong as his company Bitin is undergoing some troubles.

Soon after, Ben buys shares from the other members of the Yiu family, until he has enough, along with the borrowed shares from Anson, to stage a hostile takeover of Yiu Gong. Anson tries to stop this, but it is too late, and Ben becomes the CEO of Yiu Gong. He asks Anson to streamline the company, which in the process will leave many employees jobless, resulting in Sunday punching him. Sunday and Anson meet at a cafe and Sunday resigns, leaving for England, as they have a possible new treatment for Kei Mong's many allergies (but not before a remark from Anson that they are no longer employer and employee and so can date), and Ben goes and taunts Bong as he is released from hospital. Then, the Clean Water Project, which Yiu Gong has invested heavily in, is revealed to be a scam, making Yiu Gong, a heavy investor and Bitin's (the now parent company of Yiu Gong) stock to rapidly nosedive, shocking the whole family. An immediate board meeting is called, in which Anson advocates a cash injection, but Ben, having spent most of his cash on his hostile takeover of Yiu Gong calls for streamlining. Suddenly, Bong walks in, and tells Ben to get out of the CEO's seat in the middle of the meeting, shocking everyone. Ben laughs, calling him a delusional old man, but Bong explains that he knew that Ben was planning to take over Yiu Gong, and that he knew that the Clean Water Project was a scam, and so he let Ben take over Yiu Gong, knowing that he did not have enough money to do so, and would have to sell large amounts of his stock in Bitin. Bong then remained in hospital long after he recovered to let the Clean Water Project explode, and then immediately bought all the cheap Bitin stock on the market meaning that he staged a hostile takeover of Bitin, Yiu Gong's parent company so in the end, he had taken over both Bitin and Yiu Gong again, shocking his entire family and most of all Ben.

Anson leaves Hong Kong, after the shock of how her father masterminded such a cruel plan (as it resulted in many innocent investors in both the Clean Water Project and Yiu Gong and Bitin losing their money, and Yiu Siu Wing, her uncle being innocently kicked out by his fellow family members), but as she leaves realises that her father is showing the first signs of dementia. Ivan Yiu Chi Hau romantically asks Mui Man Kwan out, after dating throughout the series, gaining the confidence to do so from Anson's reign as CEO.

Three years later, she returns to Hong Kong after going around the world photographing butterflies, and after visiting her father, whose dementia has got to the point that he can only remember the past, goes to one of her favourite cafés that she used to visit with Sunday when she was the CEO of Yiu Gong. She discovers that it has come under new ownership and has turned into a photography themed café, and that the new owner is none other than Sunday himself, who had started a photography themed café whilst he was in England and is now expanding his business worldwide, in Beijing and Hong Kong. Having improved her driving skills, she drives Sunday off into the sunset.

== Cast ==
=== Main cast ===
Anson (Louisa So) and Sunday (Wayne Lai)

- Wayne Lai as Sunday Kei Yat Sing 祈逸昇

A single father who works as a mini bus driver. He lives with his grandmother and struggles to raise a young son with a severe food allergy problem. He strikes up a friendship with Anson the female CEO of a huge construction corporations after many encounters with each other. He is eventually asked by Anson to become her personal driver. When not working he enjoys his hobby in photography. His grandmother Pauline, hoping he can find a significant other to help him raise his son constantly sets him up on blind dates.

- Louisa So as Anson Yiu Ngai Yan 饒毅昕

Eldest and only daughter of the CEO of Yiu Gong Corp. - Yiu Siu Bong. She originally worked in the company's legal department but is forced to take on as acting CEO when her father is terminally ill while her uncle tries to take the company from her father. Due to her family issues she constantly delays her wedding with her longtime fiancee Bevis. Her step-mothers and younger half-brothers scheme against her when she is chosen as acting CEO of the family corporation.

- Tony Hung as Ivan Yiu Chi Hau 饒至孝

Anson's younger cousin and Yiu Siu Wing's son. He works in Yiu Gong's IT department. He has an obsessive compulsive disorder and a social phobia. He also has self-esteem and confidence issues because his father has never praised him. He is the only one in the Yiu family that supports Anson when she becomes the acting CEO. He meets Mui Man Kwan when his cousin Ryan brings him to a nightclub party as a joke to be made fun of.

- Natalie Tong as Mui Man Kwan 梅敏君

Sunday's ex-wife's younger sister. She has commitment issues and always runs back to live at Sunday's home when she breaks up with a boyfriend. She works all kinds of odd jobs such as bar girl, pseudo model and electronic store retailer before landing a job at Yiu Gong's IT department. She meets drunk Ivan at a party dress as a computer game character while trying to escape from a playboy who is harassing her.

=== Supporting cast ===
==== Yiu family ====
From left to right: Ben Shum Bok Man, Gu Suk Yin, Anson Yiu Ngai Yan, Yiu Siu Bong, Jason Yiu Ngai Chung, Yue Dai Chi, Elaine Fong Yi Ling, and Ivan Yiu Chi Hau.

- Chung King-fai as Yiu Siu Bong 饒兆邦

Anson, Jason and Ryan's father who is also the CEO of Yiu Gong Corp. Due to his terminal illness he is in need of a bone marrow transplant which his younger brother Siu Wing is the only match. Knowing his younger brother wants to take over his company he names his daughter Anson who is the least ambitious in his family as acting CEO.

- Lau Kong as Yiu Siu Wing 饒兆榮

Yiu Siu Bong's younger brother and Ivan's father. Once he finds out he is the only one in the family that is a bone marrow match for his older brother he makes an offer that he will only donate his bone marrow in exchange for Yiu Gong Corp.'s CEO position and be the majority share holder of the company.

- Susan Tse as Gu Suk Yin 顧淑賢

Second wife of Yiu Siu Bong, Anson's and Jason's step mother and Ryan's mother. Even though she helped raise Anson when she was younger she does not love her like she was her own. She does not feel like she has any real authority in the Yiu family due to her son being the youngest and is known for his hard partying lifestyle. Her selfishness in wanting to be Yiu Siu Bong's wife resulted to Anson's mother's death.

- Mary Hon as Elaine Fong Yi Ling 方綺鈴

Third wife of Yiu Siu Bong, Anson's and Ryan's step mother, Jason's mother and Bevis's aunt. She truly believes her son Jason will become the new CEO of Yiu Gong Corp because he is the oldest son in the family and she tries to get in good relations with her brother in-law hoping he will help her son become the next CEO. She starts to respect Anson once she understands Anson's fairness in dealing with business.

- Benjamin Yuen as Jason Yiu Ngai Chung 饒毅忠

Yiu Siu Bong's oldest son with his third wife Elaine. He is not happy when his older half sister Anson is chosen as acting CEO of Yiu Gong Corp when their father was ill since he feels being the eldest son of the family and a productive worker at Yiu Corp like him should be the acting CEO. He starts to respect Anson when she sees potential in him and she starts to give him important projects at Yiu Gong.

- Stanley Cheung as Ryan Yiu Ngai Suan 饒毅信

Yiu Siu Bong's youngest son with his second wife Suk Yin. He is known for his hard partying lifestyle but pretends to be a productive worker at Yiu Corp when his father becomes ill hoping he will be chosen as the new CEO. His laziness and disrespect for others is shown at work. When Anson starts to give major projects to Jason he becomes jealous and later sides with his uncle Yiu Siu Wing to try to oust Anson as the acting CEO of Yiu Gong.

==== Kei family ====
- Lily Leung as Pauline Tse Hau Lin 謝巧蓮

Sunday's grandmother who he lives with together with his son. As she was hoping for Sunday to find a significant other to help him raise Mong, she constantly sets him up on blind dates.

- Elaine Yiu as Miu Man Yi 梅敏儀,

Sunday's ex-wife and Mong's mother. She ran out on Sunday and Mong because she wanted to be free of any burden and see what else is out in the world to offer her. After many years she comes back to re-claim Mong in order to exchange him for a large sum of money with his biological father.

- Yiub Cheng as Kei Mong 祈望

Sunday and Man Yee's young son. Ben Shum Bok Man's biological son. He has a severe dairy allergy that prevents him from eating a lot of foods.

==== Hung family ====
- Amy Fan as Hung Lai Sa 洪麗莎

Sunday's next door neighbor who has a crush on him. She is in the midst of divorcing her current husband but dreams of becoming Sunday's wife one day. Marries Po Yung Jun.

- Ronald Law as Hung Tsz Long 洪子朗

Lai Sa's younger brother and Sunday's friend. Mui Man Kwan's ex-boyfriend. He is a police officer.

==== Yiu Gong Building Materials Corp. ====
- Ram Chiang as Yue Dai Chi 余大智

A former driver for Yiu Siu Bong who later became his trusted personal assistant. He helps Anson become the CEO of Yiu Gong Corp. He is overly protective of Anson and hires a private investigator to investigate Sunday's background.

- Li Shing-cheong as Po Yung Jun 蒲勇進

Sunday's friend and fellow driver at Yiu Gong Corp.

- KK Cheung as Ben Shum Bok Man 沈博文

Owner of Bitin, his company. A share holder at Yiu Gong Corp. With his help, Anson becomes the CEO of Yiu Gong Corp. Had a one night stand with Miu Man Yee which resulted in a son. Mong's biological father. He later stages a hostile takeover of Yiu Gong, selling some of his stocks in Bitin to do so, which are in turn bought by Bong and so gets his own company taken over by Bong, who gets Yiu Gong back in the process.

- Man Yeung as Fai 輝

A fellow driver at Yiu Gong Corp who works for the third madam Elaine. He is blackmailed by Elaine into installing secret hearing devices in Sunday's vehicle in order to know Anson's every movement.

- Jennifer Shum as Cindy
- Kibby Lau as JoJo

Works in the IT department at Yiu Gong Corp.

- Ali Lee as Yuen Ka Bo 阮嘉寶. Ivan's ex-girlfriend.
- Brian Chu as Andy
- Kyle Tse as Derek
- Leo Lee as CK
- Dolby Kwan as Leo
- Eddie Ho as George
- Calvin Chan as France
- Burmie Wong as Joyce
- Ip Ting Chi as Dora
- Albert Lo as Lawyer Yip 葉律師

==== Other cast ====
- Geoffrey Wong as Bevis Fong Tin Hang 方天恒

Anson's longtime fiancee and Elaine's nephew. He is a veterinarian. Anson's breaks off their engagement in order to remain as CEO of Yiu Gong because of her bickering family.

- Steve Lee Ka Ding as Ha San Fu 夏山虎

A small time triad boss that runs a mechanic garage. Sunday's saves his life from a kidnapper during a traffic accident.

- Bing Man Tam as Bing Suk 炳叔

Gu Suk Yin's cousin. He owns the trucking company that Yiu Gong uses to deliver their goods. He decides to butt heads with Anson when his cousin Suk Yin gossips to him about Anson being a bad step daughter which resulted in Yiu Gong no longer working with them. He spills to Anson how her mother truly died when Suk Yin refuses to give him money.

- Andy Sui as Wai 維
- Nicole Wan as Bertha
- So Lai Ming as Ada
- Louis Szeto as Lun 倫
- Kelvin Lee as Fei Ying 飛鷹

A small time triad member who works for Ha San Fu. He bullies Kei Mong at the local park when Mong accidentally causes him embarrassment.

- Raymond Tsang as Brother Leong 良哥
- Kedar Wong as Kwok Ga Hei 郭家禧

A private detective that Yue Dai Chi hires to investigate Sunday's background.

- Hinson Chou as Ah Dong 阿東

Mui Man Kwan's Taiwanese boyfriend that she broke up with. He follows her all the way to Hong Kong to look for her.

== Development ==
- The drama previously went by the production title of "Time for Marriage (男大當婚)".
- The costume fitting ceremony was held on September 12, 2013 12:30 p.m. at Tseung Kwan O TVB City Studio One.
- The blessing ceremony was held on November 26, 2013 3:30 p.m. at Tseung Kwan O TVB City.
- Filming took place from September - December 2013.
- The drama was featured in TVB's 2014 Sales Presentation.
- The drama was originally scheduled to be broadcast on April 21, 2014 at 8:30 p.m. but TVB decided to air TVS's mainland series Journey to the West 2011 instead to boast ratings, this caused controversy as Hong Kong audiences complained of the poor production quality of the "Journey to the West" series and didn't appreciate watching a mainland produced drama with poor voice dubbing instead of a locally produced Cantonese drama. Rear Mirror was then pushed back to be aired in August 2014 during TVB's Amazing Summer promotions.

== Viewership Ratings ==
Week	Episodes	Date	Average Points	Peaking Points
1	01－05	Aug 11-15, 2014	26	29
2	06－10	Aug 18-22, 2014	27	31
3	11－15	Aug 25-29, 2014	25	30
4	16－20	Sept 1-5, 2014	28	32
