= ICAC Investigators 2004 =

2004 installment of the ICAC Investigator series

- Promo poster & DVD cover
- 廉政行動2004
- Genre: Crime, Police, Non-fiction
- Created by: Independent Commission Against Corruption (Hong Kong)
- Directed by: Ep.1 & 4: Alex Cheung; Ep.2: Patrick Leung; Ep.3: Herman Yau; Ep.5: Dante Lam
- Starring: Ep.1: Wayne Lai, Gordon Liu, King Kong Lam, Power Chan; Ep.2: Julian Cheung, Sammul Chan, Felix Lok, Ruby Wong, Dickson Li; Ep.3: Alex Fong, Edmond So, Ram Chiang, Halina Tam, Maggie Shiu; Ep.4: Eddie Kwan, Lai Lok-yi, Edwin Siu, Kwok Fung, Yoyo Mung; Ep.5: Anthony Wong, Christine Ng, Carl Ng, Andrew Lin, Evergreen Mak, Hawick Lau
- Composer: Pun Hon Wai
- Country of origin: Hong Kong
- Original language: Cantonese
- No. of episodes: 5

Production
- Producers: Tommy Leung, Lo Heung Lan
- Production location: Hong Kong
- Camera setup: Multi camera
- Running time: 45 minutes
- Production company: TVB

Original release
- Network: Jade; HD Jade
- Release: 18 April – 16 May 2004

Related
- ICAC Investigators 1996 (1996); ICAC Investigators 1998 (1998); ICAC Investigators 2000 (2000); ICAC Investigators 2007 (2007); ICAC Investigators 2009 (2009); ICAC Investigators 2011 (2011); ICAC Investigators 2014 (2014); ICAC Investigators 2016 (2016); ICAC Investigations 2019 (2019)

ICAC Investigators 2004
- Traditional Chinese: 廉政行動2004
- Simplified Chinese: 廉政行动2004
Transcriptions
Standard Mandarin
- Hanyu Pinyin: lián zhèng xíng dòng 2004
Yue: Cantonese
- Jyutping: lim4 zing3 haang4 dung6 2004

ICAC Investigators 2004 (Traditional Chinese: 廉政行動2004; literally "Upright Government Walk Movement 2004") (Chinese: 廉政行動2004; Jyutping: lim4 zing3 haang4 dung6 2004) is the 2004 installment of the ICAC Investigators series, produced by Hong Kong's Independent Commission Against Corruption (ICAC) and TVB. It is broadcast on the TVB Jade channel. Each criminal case is based on actual cases investigated by the ICAC.

== Cast and Synopsis ==
=== ICAC agents on multiple cases ===
- Shek Sau as ICAC Principal Investigator Don Tang
- Marco Ngai as ICAC Senior Investigator Ron Chan
- Michael Tong as ICAC Investigator Paul Fung
- June Chan as ICAC Investigator Suki Chan
- Gregory Lee as ICAC Investigator Frankie Kwok
- Augustine Lee as ICAC Investigator Paul Kwan

=== Case #1: Gambler's Fallacy (不一樣的賭注) ===
Starring:

- Wayne Lai as Ho Fat
- Gordon Liu as Wong Tian
- King Kong Lam as Luk Dai Tong
- Power Chan as Ah Wai

Ho Fat (Wayne Lai) works as an armored truck security guard. He is an unruly employee who makes race horse bets while on the job; due to his compulsive gambling problem he is unable to pay off his loan shark. At work he is given the Hong Kong China border armor car route, but he is unhappy about it and has an argument with his supervisor. His loan shark finds out about his work route and suggest that he pays off his loan and in addition make money by transporting stolen cellular phones to mainland China. When he returns to work his supervisor decides to take him off the Hong Kong China route in order to make him happy; with his opportunity to make money on the side disappearing he begs his supervisor to keep him on the Hong Kong China route. The incident is brought to the attention of ICAC Investigator Ron Chan (Marco Ngai). ICAC finds it odd that someone who had complained would beg to have the route he didn't want back. Ho Fat gets his co-workers Wong Tian (Gordon Liu) and Luk Dai Tong (King Kong Lam) in on the scheme. ICAC obtains photograph evidence of them moving the goods in the middle of the road. With enough evidence Ho Fat, Wong Tian and Dai Tong are arrested at the border by ICAC.

=== Case #2: Malfeasance (以權謀私) ===
Starring:

- Julian Cheung as ICAC Senior Investigator Wong Kai Chun
- Sammul Chan as ICAC Investigator Ming
- Felix Lok as Au Yiu Yeong
- Ruby Wong as Ho Ming Mei
- Joseph Lee as Tam Tuen
- Dickson Li as Lau Jip Keung

Au Yiu Yeong (Felix Lok) is suspected of abusing his power as a government properties manager by hiring his girlfriend Ho Ming Mei (Ruby Wong) cousin Tam Tuen's (Joseph Lee) building maintenance and security firm to manage maintenance of government properties. ICAC agents Wong Kai Chun (Julian Cheung) and Ming (Sammul Chan) are unable to find any illegal dealings between Yiu Yeong and Tam Tuen so they decide to look through stacks of the properties management old files and find that an employee named Lau Jip Keung (Dickson Li) had tried to file a complaint against Tam Tuen's company for his workers doing an under par job of maintenance. ICAC brings Lau Jip Keung in for questioning and finds out that Yiu Yeong's colleagues were against using Tam Tuen's maintenance firm, but Yiu Yeong's insist on signing Tam Tuen's firm. After interviewing numerous employees and rival maintenance firms ICAC finds out that Yiu Yeong always favors Tam Tuen's firm. ICAC later finds evidence of Yiu Yeong forging documents so that Tam Tuen's firm would always win the government work contracts and he is arrested. At his court hearing he is heavily sentenced to 30 month in prison for being a government worker who conducted in corruption for self gain.

=== Case #3: Taxing Investigations (獵戶天龍) ===
Starring:

- Alex Fong as ICAC Senior Investigator Micheal Tang
- Edmond So as Lau Wai Suen
- Ram Chiang as Chow Bing Chung
- Halina Tam as Si Na
- Maggie Shiu as ICAC Chief Investigator Rachel
- Akina Hong as Linda Ho

Lau Wai Suen (Edmond So) and Chow Bing Chung (Ram Chiang) work for the Hong Kong IRD tax department. They conspire in helping citizens cheat on their taxes in exchange for personal gain. Wai Suen works for big corporation in cheating taxes while Bing Chung works with local street merchants for small gains. ICAC Senior Investigator Micheal Tang (Alex Fong) and Senior Investigator Ron Chan's team has to work together to gather enough evidence to make an arrest, but they are unable to before Wai Suen resigns from the IRD and works for a private accounting firm. Even though Wai Suen no longer works for IRD he is able to bribe former co-workers into giving him inside tax information. ICAC is not able to find any solid evidence on Wai Suen until they make the connection that his secretary Linda Ho (Akina Hong) is also his mistress and she is where he has been hiding the bribe money. ICAC arrest over 30 IRD employees but with no one cooperating they still don't have enough evidence to charge Wai Suen until ICAC is able to get a warrant to search IRD files. Bing Chung who does not work with Wai Suen is found guilty when ICAC finds a IRD date stamp which he illegally obtained, at his home. Even though his gain was small he too was charged with abusing his position.

=== Case #4: Short Stake (短樁) ===
Starring:

- Eddie Kwan as Wong Ding Chung
- Lai Lok-yi as ICAC Investigator Arthur Kwok
- Edwin Siu as Hung Gwok Keung
- Kwok Fung as Wu Jol Gan
- Yoyo Mung as ICAC Chief Investigator Grace
- Leila Tong as Mary

Hung Gwok Keung (Edwin Siu) is a new building engineer, he highly looks up to the head of the construction crew Wong Ding Chung (Eddie Kwan). One night he heads to the building site because he left his passport there, but at the work site he sees a bunch of construction workers cutting piling columns short. At home he tells his girlfriend Mary (Leila Tong) what he had witnessed, she tells him to do the right thing and tell his superior Wu Jol Gan (Kwow Fung). He soon finds out that everyone at work is in on the devious scheme even Ding Chung. To keep Gwok Keung quiet they bribe him with a trip to Japan, not wanting to offend the construction crew he hesitatingly accepts the bribe. ICAC receives a tip of wrongdoing when the previous project manager quits because he refused to cooperate with the construction crew. The stern new project manager demands to see all previous work documents, the construction crew afraid they will be found out forges fake files at night and have Gwok Keung pressured into signing the documents, but he refuses and finds out Ding Chung has been forging his signature, he decides to resign as he doesn't want to be part of their lies anymore. The new project manager finds the forged documents and reports it to Jol Gan, that night his life is threaten by two construction workers, soon he resigns also. ICAC finds their lead when records show a huge sum of money was transferred to the new project manager's bank account shortly after he resigned. ICAC brings him in for questioning, and he lets them know he didn't do anything wrong as he returned the money to the company and proceeds to tell ICAC all the information they need. With the forged documents on hand ICAC arrest all the workers that was involved even Gwok Keung because he had accepted bribes from them to keep quiet.

=== Case #5: Battle of Wits (終極鬥智) ===
Starring:

- Anthony Wong as ICAC Chief Investigator Antonio Wong
- Christine Ng as ICAC Principal Investigator Anna
- Carl Ng as Moriz
- Andrew Lin as Kwan Siu Yue
- Evergreen Mak as Yue Gan Son
- Hawick Lau as ICAC Officer Cheung Lap San

Moriz (Carl Ng) is a Russian nationalist who has been found with a fake passport by the police. He is sent to ICAC since the police are unsure this matter falls under their jurisdiction. Moriz tells ICAC Chief Investigator Antonio Wong (Anthony Wong) that a guy name Kwan Siu Yue (Andrew Lin) sold him the fake passport. ICAC finds out that Kwan Siu Yue is a crooked Immigration officer with a lengthy rap sheet. In exchange for letting Moriz go they ask him to help them net Siu Yue, but Moriz only agrees if ICAC protects him. Moriz sets up a fake deal with Siu Yue and his partner, Customs officer Yue Gan Son (Evergreen Mak), telling them that his boss from Russia is interested in buying a large amount of fake passports. Siu Yue demands to meet Moriz's boss in person before proceeding with the deal. In order for ICAC to carry through with the operation they work with US Customs on the case. US Customs sends one of their agents to pretend to be Moriz's boss, during the meeting with Siu Yue he tells the US agent that he can obtain a diplomatic passport for him, interested ICAC and US Customs decide to add that case to their operation. On the day of the exchange Siu Yue's partner from the US recognizes the US Customs agent and the deal almost falls through when Siu Yue tries to destroy evidence. With ICAC Investigator Wong's quick thinking he is able to stop evidence from being destroyed and all that is involved in the fake passport scam is arrested, but they forget about the African government agent who is to sell the diplomatic passport. ICAC Officer Cheung Lap San (Hawick Lau) who is still in the same facility as the African government agent pretends to be the buyer and arrest him when the deal is completed.

== See also ==
- ICAC Investigators (TV series)
- Independent Commission Against Corruption (Hong Kong)
