= Colourful Life =

Hong Kong television series

- Promo poster
- 錦繡良緣
- Genre: Period drama, Comedy
- Created by: Hong Kong Television Broadcasts Limited
- Written by: Chiu Jing Yung 趙靜蓉
- Starring: Annie Man; Frankie Lam; Gigi Wong; Louis Yuen; Ronald Cheng; Louisa So; Florence Kwok; Cutie Mui; Myolie Wu; Mimi Chu
- Theme music composer: Ronald Cheng
- Opening theme: Dyed Fabric Life 染布人生 by Ronald Cheng
- Country of origin: Hong Kong
- Original language: Cantonese
- No. of episodes: 20

Production
- Producer: Mui Siu Ching 梅小青
- Production location: Hong Kong
- Camera setup: Multi camera
- Running time: 45 minutes
- Production company: TVB

Original release
- Network: Jade
- Release: 15 January – 9 February 2001

Colourful Life
- Traditional Chinese: 錦繡良緣
- Simplified Chinese: 锦绣良缘
- Literal meaning: "Tapestry Embroidery Virtuous Fate"
Transcriptions
Standard Mandarin
- Hanyu Pinyin: Jǐn xiù liáng yuán
Yue: Cantonese
- Yale Romanization: Gam sau leung yuen
- Jyutping: gam2 sau3 loeng4 jyun4

Colourful Life (Chinese: 錦繡良緣; Jyutping: gam2 sau3 loeng4 jyun4) is a 2001 Hong Kong, ancient costumed comedy drama produced by TVB, starring Annie Man and Frankie Lam as the main leads with Gigi Wong, Louis Yuen, Ronald Cheng, Louisa So, Florence Kwok, Cutie Mui, Myolie Wu and Mimi Chu as supporting leads. The series is helmed by executive producer Mui Siu Ching and was aired as a Lunar New Year drama. Original broadcast of the series began on January 15 till February 9, 2001 on TVB's Jade channel, Monday-Friday during its 9:15-10:20 p.m. timeslot.

== Synopsis ==
The Ching family is an affluent family that produces textiles for the royal family, the government officials and the army during the Tang Dynasty. On the day of Princess Man Sing wedding to the Tibetan Emperor Songtsen Gampo, Lady Gwai, the Tang Emperor's favorite concubine, overhears the Ching's 3rd madam Sam Kam Hing (Angelina Lo) speaking ill of her to Ching's 2nd madam Sheung Goon Dan Fung (Gigi Wong) for Lady Gwai's past as the 2nd madam's personal maid. To insult the Ching's family, Lady Gwai had the fabric they gifted used as a carpet for Princess Man Sing to step on during her wedding ceremony. After hearing the Tibetan emissary, Luk Dung Zan offers a Tibetian woman of noble blood be given in marriage to Tang and seeing all the Tibetan girls present at the ceremony are unattractive, Lady Gwai suggest to the Tang Emperor that the Ching family be gifted the Tibetan girl in marriage. With the Emperor agreeing with the suggestion, second madam Ching is forced to accept the arrangement.

The Ching's fourth son, Ching Chi Hin (Frankie Lam), had no choice but to accept the marriage arrangement since he was the only unwed Ching son. Dun Ju (Annie Man), the daughter of a Tibetan general, was chosen as the bride for the Ching family. Always seeking an adventure and new exploration, Dun Ju readily agrees to the marriage and brings her personal maid and good friend, Ah Yee Ma, with her. On her way to the Tang capital, Dun Ju meets Chi Hin not knowing he is her husband to be, the two get into an argument and misunderstanding because she thinks he's a theft who is trying to steal from her. On their wedding night when they find out they have married each other,, they get in a fight and Dun Ju forces Chi Hin to sleep on the wooden bench in his study while she takes the bed for herself.

The two remain in a loveless marriage, with Dun Ju wanting to return to Tibet and Chi Hin nicknaming her "stupid pig" because her name Dun Ju pronunciation sounds the same as "stupid pig" in Chinese. One day, she runs into Luk Dung Zan, on the streets of the Tang capital. He tells her he is there to find who he claims to be his long lost son and ask for her help, promising that he will take her back to Tibet once they have finished their mission. The clues to finding this person is a gold butterfly pendent, a piece of jade and a birthmark on the persons chest.

== Cast ==
=== Ching family ===
- Gigi Wong 黃淑儀 as Sheung Goon Dan Fung 上官丹鳳 – Second madam of the Ching family. With the Ching family master and 1st madam deceased she is in charge of the operations of the family textile business. Her birth children are third son Ching Chi Yung and fourth son Ching Chi Hin.
- Angelina Lo 盧宛茵 as Sam Kam Hing 沈金卿 – 3rd madam of the Ching family. She is a petty person who gets jealous easily. She used to be the personal maid to the deceased 1st madam of the Ching family. Her birth children are second son Ching Chi Bok and fifth daughter Ching Wing Chi.
- Johnson Law 羅莽 as Ching Chi Sing 程智盛 – The eldest son to the late first madam. He is developmentally disables due to brain damage sustained during a high fever when he was 8. Despite his honest and noble character, he possesses the intellect of an 8 year old and thusly lacks standing in his family.
- Louisa So 蘇玉華 as Chow Mung Han 周夢嫻 – Wife of the first son. She is in a loveless marriage with her husband and only married him to help pay off her father's debts. Wanting to experience real love, she had thought about running off with her cousin and eloping but decided to stay loyal to her husband since he was kind to her. She was in charge of the Chings' book-keeping until the entire family found out about her father's debt and didn't trust her with the Ching family money.
- Louis Yuen 阮兆祥 as Ching Chi Bok 程智博 – The second son of the Ching family. Like his mother the 3rd madam, he is also petty, easily jealous and very competitive. In order to better his younger brother Ching Chi Hin when taking the royal exam he decided to cheat but got caught. He decided to take on the family textile business when he is banned from ever taking the royal exams again.
- Florence Kwok 郭少芸 as Sit Siu Siu 薛小小 – Wife of the 2nd son. Like her husband she is petty and gets jealous easily. She and the 3rd son's wife Cheng Yim do not get along. Both are always looking for reasons to put the other down. When her husband takes over the family textile business her ego grows and becomes extremely cruel to the servant girls, so cruel that one decides to have an affair with her husband as revenge. Her mother-in-law the 3rd Ching madam does not respect her since she is unable to give her a grandchild after being marry to Chi Bok for over 10 years.
- Ronald Cheng 鄭中基 as Ching Chi Yung 程智勇 – The third son of the Ching family. He is a lazy weakling that complains if he has to do a simple task. He does not like to work and spends his day's collecting small antiques statues. He does not get along with his 2nd brother Chi Bok due to both of their wives often fighting with each other and him sticking up for his wife, also because both brothers have different birth mothers.
- Cutie Mui 梅小惠 as Cheng Yim 鄭艷 – Wife of the 3rd son. She married into the Ching family a few years ago but is always at odds with the 2nd wife over family status. She constantly puts 2nd wife Siu Siu down by reminding her of not being able to bear a child and that her family is rich compare to 2nd wife whose family runs a small side street restaurant. She is very nosy and gossipy, often wanting to know what the other family members are up to.
- Frankie Lam 林文龍 as Ching Chi Hin 程智軒 – The fourth Ching son. He is studying to be a royal scholar. He is forced into a marriage arranged by the Tang Emperor due to him being the only son not wed yet. While married to Dun Ju he falls in love with his 1st sister-in-law younger sister Chow Mung Sze, but with urging from the 1st wife and not wanting Mung Sze to be concubine status he gives up on their love.
- Annie Man 文頌嫻 as Dun Ju 頓珠 – Wife of the 4th son. She agreed to her arranged expecting it to be adventurous and wanting to get away from Tibet. Once she arrives at the Tang capital she gets off on the wrong foot with Ching Chi Hin, the man who will be her husband. Bored and in a loveless marriage with a person she hates she longs to go back to Tibet.
- Myolie Wu 胡杏兒 as Ching Wing Chi 程穎姿 - 5th daughter and youngest child of the Ching family. Her mother does not allow her to venture out the house as she sees her as a future royal concubine for the Tang Emperor one day. She falls in love with Fung Tai Sang who works for the Ching family and her 4th brother's best friend, but her mother the 3rd madam does not approve of the relationship since Tai Sang is poor, so the two runaway and elope.

=== Ching family servants ===
- Mimi Chu 朱咪咪 as Koo Mei Wun 古美雲 - The 2nd Ching madam's personal maid. Fung Tai Sang mother and Ching Chi Hin nanny.
- Ellesmere Choi as 蔡子健 Fung Tai Sang 馮太生 - Koo Mei Wun's only child. He works at the Ching family textile factory. He and Ching Wing Chi fall in love but her mother is highly against the relationship so they runaway together to elope.
- Irene Wong 汪琳 as Ah Yee Ma 阿依瑪 - Dun Ju's personal maid and best friend. She tags along with Dun Ju to the Tang dynasty. Due to a misunderstand with Gu Ho Nam when the two first meet, they often bicker whenever they see each other. She later becomes Gu Ho Nam wife.
- Catherine Chau 周家怡 as Chun Lan 春蘭 - Ching family 3rd madam's personal maid.
- Candy Chiu 趙靜儀 as Ho Tung Mui 何冬梅 - Ching family 1st wife's personal maid. Has an affair with Ching Chi Bok as revenge for his wife Sit Siu Siu cruel treating of the servants. She becomes pregnant from the affair and becomes Chi Bok's concubine. Due to her scheming she gets Siu Siu kicked out of the Ching family.

=== Cheung Suen family ===
- Chow Chung 周 驄 as Cheung Suen Siu Lung 長孫少龍 – A Tang government official who is always teaching the rules of respect and fairness, but his true personality is the complete opposite of what he teaches.
- Mark Kwok 郭耀明 as Cheung Suen Mun Boon 長孫文本 – Cheung Suen Siu Lung's son. A Tang government official in charge of handling textile contracts. Has anger management issues. He becomes infatuated with Chow Mung Sze when he accidentally spies her bathing. The two get married but he becomes furious and beats her when he finds out about her past affections for Ching Chi Hin. Not able to let his wife's past affection for another man go, he ruins the Ching family textile business.
- May Kwong 鄺文珣 as Chow Mung Sze 周夢詩 – Ching family first wife Chow Mung Han's younger sister. She falls in love with Ching Chi Hin, but knowing she could never have wife status with him she gives up on the relationship and marries Cheung Suen Mun Boon in order to let go of her feelings for Chi Hin and also help her father pay off his debts. When she finds out that her husband is a cruel man she helps the Ching family expose his true nature.

=== Others ===
- Johnny Tang 鄧兆尊 as Gu Ho Nam 古浩男 - Koo Mei Wun's little brother. He runs a small dumpling and noodle stall. He and Ah Yee Ma have a misunderstanding when they first meet, but through constant bickering every time they meet the two later fall in love and get married.
- Al Wai (AKA, Wilson Tsui) 艾威 as Luk Dong Zan 祿東贊 (Gar Tongtsen Yulsung) - A Tibet government official sent to the Tang Empire as an emissary for the wedding of Princes Mun Sing. He later returns to the Tang mainland claiming to be looking for his long lost son.
- Tang Ho Kwong 鄧浩光 as Sun Ho Ming 孫浩明 - Chow Mung Han's older male cousin. He and his cousin love each other very much and because she is in a loveless marriage with a developmentally disabled man he wanted to have her runaway with him so that they can be together.
- Kenneth Ma 馬國明 as Student 蕭學子 - One of Ching Chi Hin classmate who is also studying to be a royal scholar.
- Michelle Fung 馮曉文 as Lady Gwai, real name Sew Yuk, a former servant that worked with Kam Hing back at the Ching household before a chance encounter with the Emperor saw him take her as a consort years before the events for the series. She is highly favors by the Emperor to the jealousy of Kam Hing.
- Chan Wing Chun 陳榮峻 as the Emperor of Tang (implied to be Emperor Taizong given the time period).
- Dai Shaomin 戴少民 as Songtsen Gampo, rule of the Tibetian Empire.
- Celia Sze Lim-Tse 施念慈 as Princess Wencheng, Songtsen Gampo's newly wed wife.

== Casting ==
- Annie Man's first leading role in a TVB drama.
- Myolie Wu's first acting role in a TVB drama.
