= The Slicing of the Demon =

Hong Kong television series

- Official poster
- Genre: Costume drama Paranormal thriller
- Written by: Lo Mei-wan
- Starring: Sunny Chan; Michael Tse; Bernice Liu; Elliot Ngok; Angela Tong
- Theme music composer: Tang Chi-wai
- Opening theme: Waan Yung Joi Yi Ma (還用在意嗎) by Bernice Liu
- Country of origin: Hong Kong
- Original language: Cantonese
- No. of episodes: 20

Production
- Executive producer: Chong Wai-kin
- Camera setup: Multi camera
- Running time: 45 mins. (each)
- Production company: TVB

Original release
- Network: TVB Jade
- Release: 18 April – 16 May 2013

The Slicing of the Demon
- Traditional Chinese: 凶城計中計
- Simplified Chinese: 凶城计中计
Transcriptions
Yue: Cantonese
- Jyutping: Hung1 Sing4 Gai3 Zung1 Gai3

The Slicing of the Demon is a Hong Kong television series produced by TVB. It was released overseas in March 2007.

== Synopsis ==
During the Ming Dynasty, executioner To Sei-hoi and his god-brother, Shui Yu-chan, a doctor, accidentally enter the town of Cheung Lung. Cheung Lung appears to be a happy and peaceful place. However, underneath the facade, it's hiding a very big secret.

The brothers meet the town's wealthiest man Fok Tin-ming, as well as his stubborn and unreasonable daughter, Fok Sin-yiu. By mistake, Hoi and Yiu get married and become husband and wife. Suddenly, a number of murders happen in the town. While investigating, Hoi discovers that he and Chan are being caught in a trap. It turns out that there's someone behind the scenes pulling the strings. But, who is it? Is it a god? A person? The unknown causes immense fear in people...

== Cast ==
=== Main characters ===
- Sunny Chan — To Sei-hoi is the adopted son of an executioner. After his foster father's death, he carries his golden executioner blade with him wherever he goes to remind himself of his identity. He befriends Shui Yu-chan, a doctor, and the two become sworn brothers.
- Michael Tse — Shui Yu-chan keeps his identity a secret in order to avenge for his late father Kong Yuk-shu. He falls in love with Sin-yiu, but later finds out that Sin-yiu is actually his enemy's daughter.
- Bernice Liu — Fok Sin-yiu is the daughter of Fok Tin-ming, Cheung Lung town's priest. She falls in love with Yu-chan and the two plan to elope, but she returns to Sei-hoi.
- Angela Tong — Poon Jai-yuet is one of Fok Tin-ming's most trusted subordinates. She falls in love with Yu-chan, often finding herself stuck between friendship and love.
- Elliot Ngok Wah — Fok Tin-ming is Cheung Lung town's priest.

=== Recurring characters ===
- Benz Hui as Kei Hok-yu
- Charmaine Li as Fok Sin-kei
- Lo Chun-shun as Poon Sing-yeung (盘昇阳) — Fok Tin-ming's right-hand man and the former crush of Wong Bik-yuk. Due to his trust issues against Shui Yu-chan and involvement in Fok Gai-ji's death, he investigates by himself and found the evidence that Shui Yu-chan was looking for. He would then be severely injured by him but was saved by Wong Bik-yuk. He eventually dies with Wong Bik-yuk under the hands of Fok Tin-ming after being mistaken that the duo were leaving Cheung Lung town for an elopement in Episode 14.
- Sherming Yiu as Wong Bik-yuk (王碧玉) — Fok Gai-ji's mother, the second wife of Fok Tin-ming and the former crush of Poon Sing-yeung. She eventually dies with Poon Sing-yeung under the hands of Fok Tin-ming after being mistaken that the duo were leaving Cheung Lung town for an elopement in Episode 14.
- Lawrence Ng as Fok Gai-ji — Wong Bik-yuk and Fok Tin-ming's son. He was eventually drowned to death after being pushed into the ocean by Shui Yu-chan to get the attention of Fok Tin-ming with his fake identity as his long lost son, Fok Gai-zhou in Episode 13.
- Ellesmere Choi as Lau Hoi-fuk
