= Annie Man =

Hong Kong actress (born 1976)

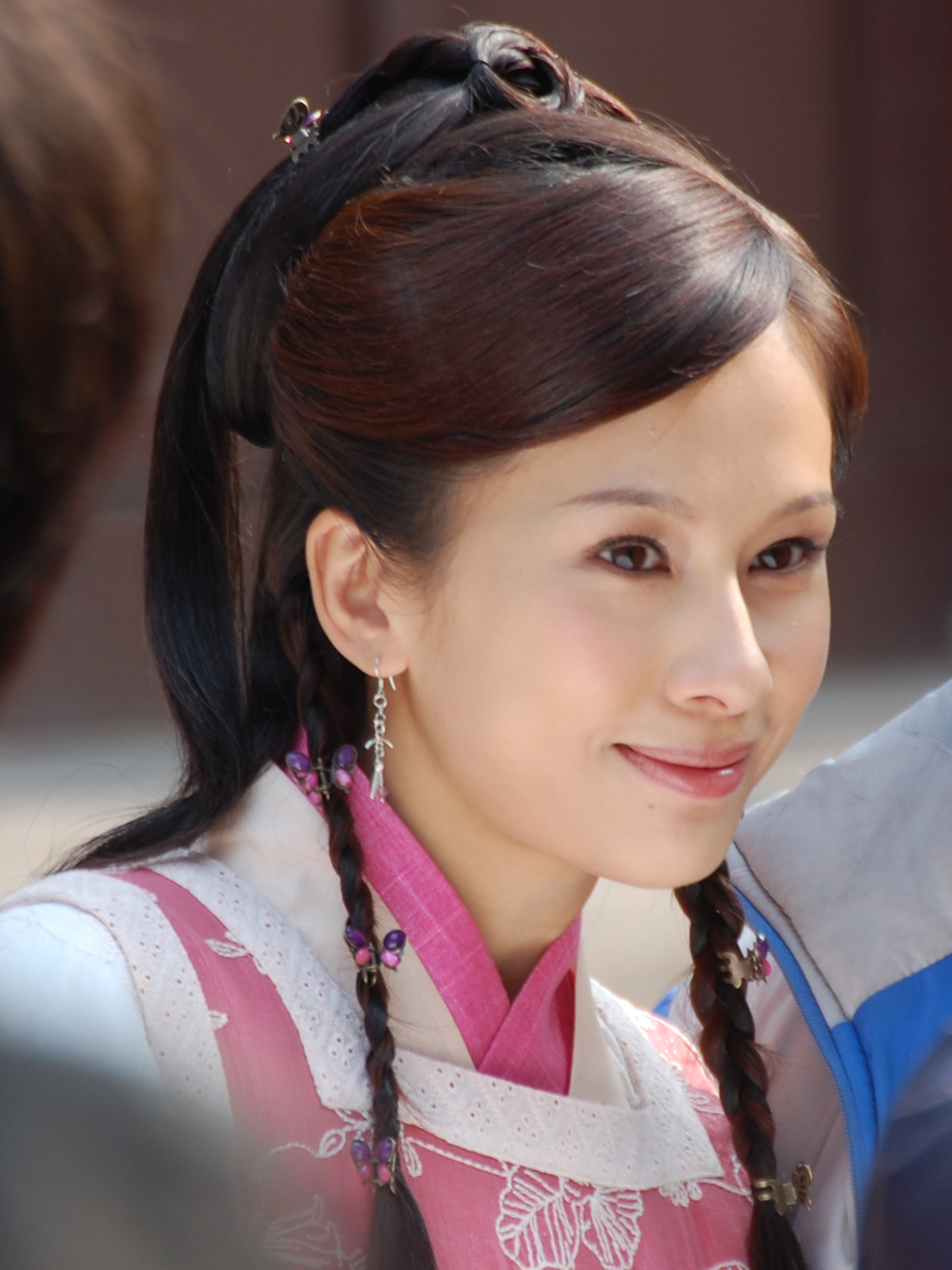
- Man at the Hengdian World Studios, December 2007, filming a TV series
- Born: 20 July 1976 (age 50); Hong Kong
- Years active: 1993–present
- Spouse: Jason Lee 李梓慎 (m. 2012)
- Children: Jamie (b. 2012)

Chinese name
- Traditional Chinese: 文頌嫻
- Simplified Chinese: 文颂娴
Transcriptions
- Musical career
- Labels: ATV (1993–1999); TVB (2000–2006)

Annabelle (or Annie) Man Chung-han (Chinese: 文頌嫻), born 20 July 1976, is an actress from Hong Kong.

== Career ==
Man started her career in television series in 1993 at the age of 16 at ATV. She played the role of a girl with a developmental disability in the 1997 film Mad Stylist directed by Stephen Yip.

After spending 6 years at ATV, Man transferred to TVB in 2000. Five years later, she ended her corporation with TVB and looked forward to retrieving her career in Mainland China.

=== ATV (1993–1999) ===
Throughout her 6 years at ATV, Man has appeared in a total of 22 series and took on the lead role on numerous occasions. In 1998, she was even voted by fans as one of the top 10 actresses in ATV.

List of ATV series with Man's appearance:

- 1993: Shanghai Godfather II (再見黃埔灘 II 之再起風雲), as Yu Xiao Man;
- 1994: Bays of Being Parents (可憐天下父母心), as Zhang Jia Xin;
- 1994: Beauty Pageant (ATV) (鳳凰傳説), as Fang Xue Ming;
- 1994: Secret Battle of the Majesty (君臨天下), as Princess Gong Hui (Ge Ge);
- 1994: Outlaw Hero (法外英雄), as Cheng Jia Mei;
- 1995: Vampire Expert (僵屍道長), Yu Bi Xin;
- 1995: Pao Qingtian (包青天之公正廉明);
- 1996: The Little Vagrant Lady (飃零燕), as Li Ya Qiu;
- 1996: King Of Gamblers (千王之王重出江湖), as Zhong Ruo Fu;
- 1996: Vampire Expert II (僵屍道長II), as Lei Xiu;
- 1996: Tales from the Dorms (坊間故事之甘戴綠頭巾);
- 1996: The Little Vagrant Lady II (飃零燕 II 之孤星淚), as Li Ya Qiu;
- 1997: Year of Chameleon (97 變色龍), as Peng Xiao Qin;
- 1997: Coincidentally (等著你回來), as He Ru Zhu (i.e. Dai Zhu);
- 1997: Pride of Chaozhou (我來自潮州), Chen Suo Zhen;
- 1997: Gold Rush (著數一族), as Dai Xue Yi;
- 1998: Thou Shalt Not Cheat (呆佬賀壽), as Yuan Xiao Xuan;
- 1998: Heroine of the Yangs (穆桂英大破天門陣), as Yang Pai Feng;
- 1998: Heroine of the Yangs II (穆桂英 II 十二寡婦征西), as Yang Pai Feng;
- 1998: I Come from Guangzhou (我來自廣州), as Ya Di (i.e. Xia Ku Cao);
- 1998: Flaming Brothers (縱橫四海), as Ming Xing (child version);
- 1999: Ten Tigers of Guangdong (廣東十虎), as Su Qiu Shuang;

=== TVB (1999–2005) ===
Shortly after signing on with TVB, Man was cast into a major series, The Legendary Four Aces where she played a prominent role. Her major break came in 2001 when she was cast as the lead actress in Colourful Life alongside Frankie Lam (whom she had previously partnered with at ATV). Man's character in the series, the lovable princess with a heart of gold called Dun Zhu (顿珠), had such a lasting memory on the audience that she became instantly recognised by the name of her character.

Later in the same year, she took on yet another lead role in Whatever It Takes (co-starring Benny Chan). Despite being seen by many as a promising young actress, her talents had not been recognised and she was thereafter reduced to supporting roles.

During her years at TVB, Man has appeared in 13 TV series as well as making guest appearances at various host shows.

=== TVB ===
- 2000: The Legendary Four Aces (金裝四大才子), as Zhu Xiao Lian;
- 2000: Seven Sisters (七姐妹), as Xie Mei Ning;
- 2001: Colourful Life (錦繡良緣), as Dun Zhu;
- 2001: Whatever It Takes (天子尋龍), as Bi Yao/Yang Yuhan
- 2002: Burning Flame II (烈火雄心 II), as Ye Xiang Yang;
- 2002: Slim Chances (我要 Fit 一 Fit), as Sun Qiao Bi;
- 2002: Take My Word For It (談判專家), as Ye Ke Ren;
- 2003: Perish in the Name of Love (帝女花), as Li Yu Xian;
- 2003: Greed Mask (迷情家族), as Zhou Yi Tong;
- 2004: To Love With No Regrets (足稱老婆八兩夫), as Lu Qian;
- 2004: Strike at Heart (驚艷一槍), as Zhi Nu;
- 2005: The Gateau Affairs (情迷黑森林), as Sarah;
- 2006: A Pillow Case of Mystery (施公奇案), as Qian Li Shu;
- 2023: Dead Ringer (疊影狙擊), as Tina Fok

=== Film ===
- 1995: Thunderbolt (霹靂火), as Xiao Mei;
- 1995: Love, Guns And Glass (玻璃搶的愛);
- 1996: Muto Bontie (摩登菩呢提);
- 1996: Those Were The Days (4 個 32A 和一個香蕉少年), as Pat;
- 1997: Mad Stylist (至激殺人犯), as Xiao Hua;
- 1999: Night Club (舞廳), as Linda;
- 2000: Killers from Beijing (雇用兵), as Ah Shen;
- 2000: Evil Fade (魔鬼教師);
- 2001: Wishful Milenio (千禧願), as Xiao Chun;
- 2003: Chemical Crisis (連鎖奇幻檔案之生化危城);
- 2004: Koma (救命), as Ah Shan;
- 2005: Lavender Eternal (星夢情真);
- 2008: Hong Kong Bronx

=== China Mainland (2008–present) ===
- 2008: The Kung Fu Master Wong Fei Hung (仁者黃飛鴻), as Little Sparrow;
- 2009: Shi Da Qi Yuan (十大奇冤), as Su Qin;
- 2009: Zhan You Gu Shi (战友故事), as Mai Li
- 2010: Love (爱), as unknown

=== VIU (2020–present) ===
- 2020: Warriors Within (打天下), as Mo Keli;

== Personal life ==
On March 2, 2012, Man married a businessman, Jason Lee. On August 20, Man gave birth to a daughter, Jaime.
