= ICAC Investigators 2014 =

Hong Kong television series

- Promo poster
- 廉政行動2014
- Genre: Crime, Police, Non-fiction
- Created by: Independent Commission Against Corruption (Hong Kong)
- Directed by: Ep.1: Adam Wong, Dante Lam; Ep.2: Terry Tong; Ep.3: Herman Yau; Ep.4: Teddy Robin; Ep.5: Alex Cheung
- Starring: Ep.1: Liu Kai-chi, Jo Koo, Venus Wong, Hugo Wong; Ep.2: Lawrence Cheng, Gardner Tse, Raymond Wong Ho-yin; Ep.3: Alice Chan, Joyce Tang, Shirley Yeung, Jason Chan; Ep.4: Ruco Chan, K. K. Cheung, Sire Ma; Ep.5: Eddie Kwan, Vincent Wong, Kenny Wong, Jade Leung
- Composer: Pun Hon Wai
- Country of origin: Hong Kong
- Original language: Cantonese
- No. of episodes: 5

Production
- Producers: Tommy Leung, Lo Heung Lan
- Production location: Hong Kong
- Camera setup: Multi camera
- Running time: 45 minutes
- Production company: TVB

Original release
- Network: Jade; HD Jade
- Release: 5 April – 3 May 2014

Related
- ICAC Investigators 1996 (1996); ICAC Investigators 1998 (1998); ICAC Investigators 2000 (2000); ICAC Investigators 2004 (2004); ICAC Investigators 2007 (2007); ICAC Investigators 2009 (2009); ICAC Investigators 2011 (2011); ICAC Investigators 2016 (2016); ICAC Investigations 2019 (2019)

ICAC Investigators 2014
- Traditional Chinese: 廉政行動2014
- Simplified Chinese: 廉政行动2014
Transcriptions
Standard Mandarin
- Hanyu Pinyin: lián zhèng xíng dòng 2014
Yue: Cantonese
- Jyutping: lim4 zing3 haang4 dung6 2014

ICAC Investigators 2014 (Chinese: 廉政行動2014; Jyutping: lim4 zing3 haang4 dung6 2014) is the 2014 edition of the ICAC Investigator series, produced by Independent Commission Against Corruption (Hong Kong) (ICAC) and broadcast on TVB. Each criminal case is based on actual cases investigated by the ICAC.

== Cast and Synopsis ==
=== Case #1: Better Tomorrow ===
Starring:

- Liu Kai-chi as ICAC Martin
- Jo Koo as Betty Lai
- Venus Wong as ICAC Kwok Siu Lam
- Hugo Wong as Patrick
- Lily Li as Betty Lai's mother

Kwok Siu Lam (Venus Wong) is a new ICAC investigator, she is very ambitious and hopes to be assigned to major cases right away. However her first assignment is a case to investigate supermarket workers that takes bribes for selling baby milk powder. Siu Lam gets close to supermarket manager Betty Lai (Jo Koo) in order to uncover the true operation of this scheme, but seeing Betty as a single mother with a young daughter to take care of she is disappointed to see regular citizens resort to taking bribes in order to make ends meet. Senior investigator Martin (Liu Kai Chi) reminds Siu Lam of why ICAC was set up, in order to rid those who corrupt to better themselves. With Martin's assurance she is reminded of why she wanted to be an ICAC agent and realize all ICAC cases are treated the same. ICAC finds out that Betty withholds stocks from hitting the supermarket selves in order to sell large shipments to a mainland supplier for a cut of the profit because milk powder are resold at a higher price in mainland.

Actual case: The case is based on the 2011 ParknShop supermarket chain baby milk powder bribery case code name "sunshine". Baby milk powder produced in Japan were rationed in Hong Kong due to the 2011 Tōhoku earthquake and tsunami, milk powder supply was limited. Supermarket workers would take bribes in order to inform customers when shipments of milk powder would arrive and also selling large quantities to Mainland suppliers for a cut of the profit sold in Mainland.

=== Case #2: Web of Greed ===
Starring:

- Lawrence Cheng as Leung Tak Sing
- Tse Kwan-ho as ICAC Chapman Cheuk
- Raymond Wong Ho-yin as ICAC Mak Siu Tin

Leung Tak Sing (Lawrence Cheng) is the Chief Building Services Engineer of the Housing Department in Hong Kong. He uses his position to take bribes from contractor in exchange for issuing government contracts to them. He is very cautious of his dealings and tends to meet those giving him bribes in open areas using code words to discuss their dealings. ICAC investigators Chapman Cheuk (Gardner Tse) and Mak Siu Tin (Raymond Wong) are on to him but unable to find any solid evidence against him. They seek the help of other government departments and ask for the Housing Department permission to install hidden cameras in Tak Sing's office. With video evidence of Tak Sing counting his bribe money in his office ICAC is able to make an arrest.

Actual case: The case is based on Chan Kau-tai, who is also the father of Hong Kong singer actor Eason Chan. Chan Kau-tai was convicted for accepting HK $3 million in bribes and served a 6-year sentence.

=== Case #3: Money Mind ===
Starring:

- Alice Chan as Yip Mei Lan
- Joyce Tang as ICAC Cheung Man Fung
- Shirley Yeung as Jo Jo Yeung
- Jason Chan as ICAC Raymond Wong Chi Chung

Yip Mei Lan (Alice Chan) is a well known Hong Kong businesswomen. Her personal story is legendary as she rose from poor noodle shop operator in the mainland to the top of Hong Kong high society, but her rise was not easy. She sacrifices herself by marrying a Hong Kong man she did not love in order to gain Hong Kong citizenship. Once she became a citizen she divorces her Hong Kong husband and abandons their daughter, so she can legally marry her mainland husband and have him immigrate to Hong Kong. Once Mei Lan and her mainland husband are together again they ambitiously build an empire by investing in real-estate and opening night clubs. Her ambitions get the better of her when she begins insider trading, in the end she feels like the most foolish women in world when she finds out her mainland husband whom she sacrificed so much for uses their wealth to support his many mistresses.

Actual case: The case is based on 2006 Mao Yuping credit fraud case. Mao Yuping, wife of Shanghai tycoon Zhou Zhengyi, was sentenced to 32 months in prison for conspiracy to defraud using letters of credits worth HK$49 million (US$6.32 million). Mao Yuping is also known for famously slapping Hong Kong actress Kristy Yeung in 2002 at a restaurant in public for having an affair with her husband Zhou Zhengyi.

=== Case #4: Goal Tricks ===
Starring:

- Ruco Chan as ICAC Kelvin Chan Kwok Yan
- K. K. Cheung as ICAC Lee Chi Chung
- Sire Ma as ICAC BoBo Law Po Man
- Ronald Law Kwan Moon as Kong Chi Wah

Kong Chi Wah (Ronald Law) is an aspiring and passionate soccer player who goes astray when he gets entangled with illegal soccer gamblers. To make money on the side he starts to purposely throw soccer games but matters become worse when he starts to recruit other soccer players to throw the game also. ICAC is tipped off of the illegal gamblings happening with the players. ICAC investigator Kelvin Chan Kwok Yan (Ruco Chan), Lee Chi Chung (Cheung Kwok Keung) and BoBo Law Po Man (Sire Ma) secretly investigate on the players. Some of players agree to throwing the game to make money on the side while some who remain dedicated to their game continue to practice in order for their team to win.

Actual case: The case is based on 2011's Hong Kong Sapling Football Club player Iu Wai who would offer bribes to other players in order to fix a match.

=== Case #5: Partner ===
Starring:

- Eddie Kwan as ICAC Edmond Lee
- Vincent Wong as ICAC Jacky
- Kenny Wong as Chow Sir
- Jade Leung as Elaine Wong Sui Ling
- Desmond So as John Ng
- Hoffman Cheng as Fung Chi Keung

ICAC reached its 20th anniversary in the 1990s and it was also reported that police corruption was in its decline because of the ICAC agency dedication on bringing those who corrupt to justice. But in the present time a case involving more than twenty police officers, ranging from low to high ranks including police officer Fung Chi Keung (Hoffman Cheng) and Chief Inspector John Ng (Desmond So) corruption is brought to the attention of ICAC. ICAC investigator Edmond Lee (Eddie Kwan) who was part of a police corruption case in the 90's now leads rookie investigator Jacky (Vincent Wong) to follow up on the new corruption case.

== Premiere ==
A premiere screening of the first episode was held at the Grand Theatre of the Hong Kong Cultural Centre on 26 March 2014, one week before the airing of the series.

== Ratings ==
Episodes	Date	Average Points
1	April 4, 2014	18
2	April 12, 2014	18
3	April 19, 2014	17
4	April 26, 2014	17
5	May 3, 2014	17
Average		17

== See also ==
- ICAC Investigators (TV series)
- Independent Commission Against Corruption (Hong Kong)
