= Take My Word For It =

- Promo poster
- 談判專家
- Genre: Crime drama Action
- Starring: Bobby Au-Yeung; Julian Cheung; Kenix Kwok; Annie Man; Moses Chan; Winnie Yeung; Ellesmere Choi
- Opening theme: "Overcome Challenges" by Julian Cheung
- Ending theme: "Another Day" by Julian Cheung
- Country of origin: Hong Kong
- Original language: Cantonese
- No. of episodes: 30

Production
- Running time: Approximately 45 minutes

Original release
- Network: TVB
- Release: November 18 – December 30, 2002

Take My Word For It (Chinese: 談判專家) is a 30–episode TVB drama broadcast between November 2002 and December 2002.

== Synopsis ==
The story follows the lead characters through their experiences as members of the Police Negotiation Cadre (PNC). The PNC is a volunteer unit of the Hong Kong police force specializing in negotiations with terrorist members, partakers of local violence, and individuals contemplating suicide. The whole series is dotted with both large and small cases handled by the story's heroes and heroines. There is a love square between Pang Kwok-Tung (Bobby Au-Yeung), Kan Kit (Kenix Kwok), Mok Ka-Chung (Moses Chan) and Poon Man-Ching (Winnie Yeung). Bobby Au-Yeung later finds out that Winnie is cheating on him and secretly meeting Moses, Kenix Kwok's husband. Moses and Winnie leave Hong Kong, however, Moses returns to Hong Kong with the news that Winnie has once again separated from her husband and found another man. Yeung Kwong and Ip Ho-Yan have a comical love relationship, and marry in the end. Eventually, Bobby and Kenix get together. Many problems also happen in Yeung Kwong's (Julian Cheung) family. He is not his father's biological son (although he is favoured over his three siblings). Ip Ho-Yan (Annie Man) has a brief relationship with Julian Cheung's brother, Yeung Hau-Mo (Ellesmere Choi), but it ends when Ellesmere Choi cannot forget his previous girlfriend. Ip Ho-Yan and Julian Cheung start off as beginners learning about PNC. Towards the end, they become professional members of the PNC, and even stop their own instructor, Pang Kwok-Tung (Bobby Au-Yeung) from committing suicide.

== Cast ==
- Bobby Au-Yeung as Pang Kwok-Tung
- Julian Cheung as Yeung Kwong
- Kenix Kwok as Kan Kit
- Annie Man as Ip Ho-Yan
- Moses Chan as Mok Ka-Chung
- Winnie Yeung as Poon Man-Ching
- Ellesmere Choi as Yeung Hau-Mo
- Leila Tong as Ip Ho-Oi
- Catherine Chau as Ip Ho-Hei
- Law Lok Lam as Yeung Sau-Yip
- Yu Chi Ming as Pang Tai-Fuk
- Angelina Lo as Tang Siu-Lan
- Lee Sing Cheung as Pang Kwok-Fu
- Yu Mo Lin as Cheuk Siu-Bing
- Wai Kar Hung as Chai Ka-Chuen
- Kenneth Ma as part of SDU (police, very small role)

== Awards and achievements ==
TVB Anniversary Awards (2003)

- "Top 10 Favorite Characters" (Julian Cheung - Yeung Kwong)
