= Love and Again =

Hong Kong television series

- Official poster
- 駁命老公追老婆
- Genre: Modern drama Supernatural; Fantasy; Romance; Comedy
- Written by: Wong Kwok Fai; Ng Lap Kwong
- Starring: Alex Fong; Sonija Kwok; Moses Chan; Michael Tse; Fiona Yuen; Angela Tong; Leila Tong
- Theme music composer: Louis Cheung
- Opening theme: Try Again by Sammi Cheng
- Country of origin: Hong Kong
- Original language: Cantonese
- No. of episodes: 20

Production
- Executive producer: Chong Wai-kin
- Production location: Hong Kong
- Camera setup: Multi camera
- Production company: TVB

Original release
- Network: TVB Jade
- Release: 1 March – 26 March 2011

Love and Again
- Traditional Chinese: 駁命老公追老婆
- Simplified Chinese: 驳命老公追老婆
- Literal meaning: "Husband Chases Wife With All His Might"
Transcriptions
Standard Mandarin
- Hanyu Pinyin: Bómìng Lǎogōng Zhuī Lǎopó
Yue: Cantonese
- Jyutping: Bok3 Meng6 Lou2 Gung1 Zeoi1 Lou2 Po4

Love and Again is a Hong Kong modern drama series produced by TVB starring Alex Fong, Sonija Kwok, Moses Chan, Michael Tse and Fiona Yuen. It was filmed from 2001 to 2002 and premiered overseas in November 2002. Then, it premiered on TVB Pay Vision on 29 March 2004 and ended on 23 April 2004. Later, it premiered on TVB Jade on 1 March 2011 and ended on 26 March.

== Plot ==
Lau Fuk Wing (Michael Tse) and Suen Siu Yuet (Sonija Kwok) were a married couple with a child. Due to a car accident caused by Andy Leung Tak Wah (Alex Fong), an arrogant man disliked by those around him, Fuk Wing died and left Siu Yuet in grief.

Fuk Wing's soul refuses to reincarnate due to the feeling of injustice of how he died. So with the help of a ghost Ngau Yat Yat (Fiona Yuen), his soul accidentally enters the body of Tak Wah and once again tries pursue his wife as Tak Wah. As a result, he fails many times in trying to win Siu Yuet over after she finds out that Tak Wah was the one to cause Fuk Wing's death. Even after she is able to forgive that, a new man enters the scene and becomes another love rival to Fuk Wing/Tak Wa: Angus Ying Chun (Moses Chan), her dancing instructor.

== Cast ==
=== The Leung family ===
Cast	Role	Description
Yu Chi Ming (余子明)	Leung Kwai Chuen 梁貴全	Leung Tak Wah's father In episode 20, he originally died of suicide by jumping off from the rooftop that he was living after his son took back his own body from Fuk Wing after killing him and Siu Yuet in the same way that killed him but his suicide was reverted after Tak Wah was devastated and filled with regrets after the suicide and pleaded Luk Poon to revert everything he did before crashing the taxi which killed Fuk Wing and Siu Yuet.
Alex Fong	Leung Tak Wah (Andy) 梁德華	Star Entertainment Group artiste manager Leung Kwai Chuen's son Ying Chun's good friend Fong Mei Sze's former love interest Due to his family being poor, his mother died from an illness which leaded him becoming a greedy person and began his gambling addiction since his study years. Died of car accident in episode 1, his body was then used by Lau Fuk Wing to come back to life In episode 19, his spirit comes back to life in a body resembling Lau Fuk Wing and pretends to be him to take back his own body from him. He attempted many ways to take back his body from Fuk Wing such as blackmailing him that he will hurt Siu Yuet if he doesn't give back his body. He eventually took back his body after killing Fuk Wing and Siu Yuet in the same way that killed him but eventually filled with regrets as his father killed himself by jumping off from the rooftop that he was living in and pleaded Luk Poon to revert everything he did before crashing the taxi which killed Fuk Wing and Siu Yuet. In the ending of episode 20, it is revealed that he has been reincarnated to Fuk Wing and Siu Yuet's male twin son after Fuk Wing saw the latter holding a cotton bud pointing at the birds that Kwai Chuen kept on a tree.

=== The Lau family ===
Cast	Role	Description
Teresa Ha (夏萍)	Chiu Lai King 趙麗瓊	Lau Fuk Wing and Lau Fuk Mui's mother
Michael Tse	Lau Fuk Wing 劉福榮	Fuk Wing Renovate Company owner and taxi driver Chiu Lau King's son Lau Fuk Mui's older brother Suen Siu Yuet's husband Lau Chui Yee's father Died in from a car accident in episode 1, later used Leung Tak Wah's body to come back to life Near the end, Leung Tak Wah's spirit uses Ng Lap Kwong's body, which resembles Lau's, to impersonate Lau
Sonija Kwok	Suen Siu Yuet 孫小玥	Fuk Wing Renovate Company owner and Star Entertainment Group staff Lau Fuk Wing's wife Lau Chui Yee's mother Ying Chun's love interest
Leila Tong	Lau Fuk Mui (Bobo) 劉福梅	Star Entertainment Group artiste Chiu Lai King's daughter Lau Fuk Wing's younger sister KwokSze Yuen's love interest
Hung Pui San (洪珮珊)	Lau Chui Yee 劉翠怡	Lau Fuk Wing and Suen Siu Yuet's daughter

=== The Ying family ===
Cast	Role	Description
Cecilia Fong (方伊琪)	Chui Ting 崔婷	Ying Chun and Ying Fung's mother
Moses Chan	Ying Chun (Angus) 邢浚	Ying Gate Dancing Group owner and dancer Chui Ting's older son Ying Fung's older brother Leung Tak Wah's good friend
Matt Yeung	Ying Fung (Ryan) 邢豐	Star Entertainment Group singer Ying Chun's younger brother Chui Ting's younger son

=== Star Entertainment Group (星藝公司) ===
Cast	Role	Description
Leung Kin Ping (梁健平)	KK	Star Entertainment Group boss
Alex Fong	Leung Tak Wah (Andy) 梁德華	Star Entertainment Group artiste manager See The Leung family
Angela Tong	Fong Mei Sze (Macy) 方美斯	Star Entertainment Group Promotion PR manager Lo Yan Ping's girlfriend Admired Leung Tak Wah
Sonija Kwok	Suen Siu Yuet 孫小玥	Star Entertainment Group staff See The Lau family
Leila Tong	Lau Fuk Mui (Bobo) 劉福梅	Star Entertainment Group artiste See The Lau family
Matt Yeung	Ying Fung (Ryan) 邢豐	Star Entertainment Group singer See The Ying family
Dickson Lee (李家聲)	Lo Yan Ping (Ringo) 路仁秉	Composer; Fong Mei Sze's boyfriend
Josephine Shum (岑寶兒)	Fu Sing Mung 傅星夢	Star Entertainment Group artiste
Siu Chuen Yung (邵傳勇)	Tse Koon Hei (Fred) 譚冠希	
Lam Pui Kwan (林佩君)	Rashel	Star Entertainment Group staff
Yau Ching (尤程)	Monica	Star Entertainment Group staff
Yip Chun Sing (葉振聲)	Joe	Star Entertainment Group staff
Bond Chan (陳少邦)	Nick	Star Entertainment Group staff
Jason Lam (林遠迎)	Jason	Star Entertainment Group staff
Yu Mo Lin (余慕蓮)	Siister Ngo 娥姐	Janitor

=== Underworld ===
Cast	Role	Description
Tam Yat Ching (譚一清)	Luk Poon 陸判	Ngau Yat Yat and Ma Sam Sam's superior
Fiona Yuen	Ngau Yat Yat 牛一一	Ox-Head of the underworld Luk Poon's subordinate Admires Leung Tak Wah
Ngok Fung (岳峰)	Ma Sam Sam 馬三三	Horse-Face of the underworld Luk Poon's subordinate

=== Other cast ===
Cast	Role	Description
Gregory Lee (李泳豪)	Kwok Sze Yuen 郭思源	Fuk Wing Renovate Company worker Loves Lau Fuk Mui; Mok Lan's son
Mimi Chu (朱咪咪)	Mok Lan 葉蘭	Herb Tea store owner Kwok Sze Yuen's mother
Kenneth Ma	Sales agent A 經理甲	
Poon Koon Lam (潘冠霖)	邢浚女友; Ying Chun's girlfriend	
Tsui Wing	Mister Fok 霍先生	Merry Auto East Asia CEO
Tsang Wai Wan (曾慧雲)	Maple	Ying Gate Dancing Group staff
Yvonne Ho (何綺雲)	Mei Kwan 美君	Suen Siu Yuet's dancing friend
Ngai Wai Man (魏惠文)	Doctor 醫生	
Daniel Kwok (郭卓樺)	Reporter 記者	
Law Chung Wah (羅頌華)	Mister Yuen 阮生	

== Reception ==
=== Critical reception ===
Love and Again has received generally mixed reviews from critics. On Douban, the serial received a rating of 6.8 out of 10 based on over two hundred votes.

Love and Again has been criticized due to its theme being unclear and with the logic displayed in it which caused its ratings being mixed. However as years went by after its run, most viewers started to enjoy the show and compared it with the dramas that TVB produced nowadays.
