= Just Love II =

- Official poster
- 老婆大人II
- Genre: Modern Drama
- Starring: Jessica Hsuan; Sunny Chan; Benz Hui; Joyce Tang; Natalie Tong; Johnson Lee
- Country of origin: Hong Kong
- Original language: Cantonese
- No. of episodes: 25

Production
- Producer: Chong Wai-kin
- Running time: 45 minutes (approx.)

Original release
- Network: TVB
- Release: May 4 – June 5, 2009

Related
- Just Love (2005)

Just Love II (Traditional Chinese: 老婆大人II) is a TVB modern drama series, aired as of May 2009, starring Jessica Hsuan, Sunny Chan, and Natalie Tong.

It is a sequel to 2005's Just Love (老婆大人).

== Synopsis ==
Shrewish husband V.S. Shrewd wife
A bond between justice and affection

Career-minded court judge Ko Hei Man (Jessica Hsuan), receives full support from her husband Kot Kwok Kwong (Sunny Chan) so that she is able to fully concentrate on her work. The couple even have a son named Ah B. At court, Man believes everyone is equal before the law and she tackles every challenge confidently. At home, Man never bothers with the household duties which are taken care of by her husband.

When Ho Sau Sau (Joyce Tang) meets Man, they get along well and become friends. Along the way, Man also meets Ho Shi Fu (Benz Hui), a greedy but well-meaning man. Fu had gotten sued a multiple number of times, leaving Man with a bad impression of him. Unknown to Fu, Sau is his daughter that he kicked out of his house when she was a just a child, along with her mother. When Fu realizes this, he tries to earn her forgiveness. However, a DNA test reveals that Sau and Man were switched when they were babies and that Fu is actually the father of Man.

At first, Man is unable to accept Fu as her father, refusing to believe that she is related to such a horrible man. Fu, wanting Man to accept him, makes some changes to his lifestyle to become a better person. He secretly follows Man around and helps her when she needs it. Seeing that he has changed for the better, Man finally calls him "dad." The father and daughter catch the eye of newspapers and journalists, leading to many court trials, misunderstandings, as well as the stress of being followed by photographers everywhere. This leads Fu to think of himself as a burden to Man, resulting in him leaving for mainland China.

While this happens, Sau sees how happy Man's life is and begins to become jealous. Due to her slight mental problems, Sau starts to think that Man is out to get her and she begins to plot to take away everything which she thinks is rightfully hers. When Kwong contracts a brain tumor, Sau convinces him not to tell Man until he's sure if its fatal or not. When Man leaves for mainland China to search for Fu, Kwong takes this opportunity to get his brain tumor checked, all the while hiding it from his wife. Sau begins copying Man: wearing a wig, taking her clothes, borrowing her perfume and lipstick, and even addresses herself as Kwong's wife.

When Man gets back, she starts to become concerned over Sau's sudden obsessive desire to be like her. They try to bring in a mental specialist, but all this does is give Sau a mental breakdown and she storms away in rage. After bringing her back home, Kot Tak Wan (Johnson Lee), Kwong's relative, manages to cheer her up and bring back her self-confidence.

Kwong's brain tumor report comes out and he is given the choice of removing it. However, there is a chance he might forget everything. Due to this, Kwong refuses to do the operation, scared he might forget Man and Ah B. Due to the side-effects of the brain tumor, Kwong constantly faints as well as forgets simple things like when he had breakfast. Man tries her best to convince Kwong to do the surgery but he refuses to do it and tells Man to stop pressuring him. Left with no choice, Man declares a divorce. At their divorce hearing, Man tells the judge that to accept Kwong's future death, she must go back to her previous way of life, before she was married.

The next day, Man gets a hold of a disc that Kwong made to show their son when he's dead. Man is deeply touched and makes a disc of her own to convince Kwong do the operation. Kwong sees it and at the next divorce hearing, they come to realize the other person's perspective and Kwong finally decides to do the surgery. In the end, Kwong's surgery is revealed to be successful, and the whole family laughs as they celebrate Ah B's 4th birthday.

Meanwhile, Kot Bo-Yee (Natalie Tong), finds herself in a romance with fellow lawyer CK.

"Just Love II" is a story about law and human nature. How would the couple tide over the difficulties?

== Cast ==
Cast	Role	Description
Jessica Hsuan	Ko Hei-Man (Honor) 高希敏	Judge; Kot Kwok-Kwong's wife Kot Yin-Cho's mother Ho Shi Fu's daughter
Sunny Chan	Kot Kwok-Kwong (Scott) 葛國光	Ko Hei-Man's husband. Kot Yin-Cho's father
Timothy Ip	Kot Yin-Cho (Ah B) 葛彥祖	Ko Hei-Man and Kot Kwok-Kwong's son
Joyce Tang	Ho Sau-Sau (Cally) 何秀秀	Kot Tak-Wan's lover
Patrick Tang	So Ah-Gei (AK) 蘇亞基	Guest Star; Lawyer; Leung Yun-Yun's husband.
Selena Li	Leung Yun-Yun (Yoyo) 梁昕昕	Guest Star; Lawyer; So Ah-Gei's wife.
Johnson Lee	Kot Tak-Wan (Vincent) 葛德雲 (十三公)	Kot Kwok-Kwong's uncle Ho Sau Sau's lover
Natalie Tong	Kot Bo-Yee (Bowie) 葛寶怡	Kot Kwok-Kwong's second youngest sister. Law Clerk
Casper Chan	Kot Bo-Bui 葛寶貝	Kot Kwok-Kwong's youngest sister. Journalist
Benz Hui	Ho Shi Fu 何時富	Ko Hei-Man's father.

== Awards and nominations ==
TVB Anniversary Awards (2009)

- Best Drama
- Best Supporting Actress (Joyce Tang)
- Most Improved Actor (Johnson Lee)

== Viewership ratings ==
	Week	Episodes	Average Points	Peaking Points	References
1	May 4–8, 2009	1 — 5	27	29	
2	May 11–15, 2009	6 — 10	27	32	
3	May 18–22, 2009	11 — 15	29	32	
4	May 25–29, 2009	16 — 19	28	—	
5	June 1–5, 2009	20 — 25	28	33	
