= Hong Kong Bronx =

2008 Hong Kong film by Billy Chung

- DVD cover
- Directed by: Billy Chung
- Written by: Wong Jing
- Produced by: Wong Jing
- Starring: Jordan Chan; Kenny Wong; Annie Man; Winnie Leung; Ricky Chan; Timmy Hung; Ada Wong; Vonnie Lui
- Cinematography: Ko Chiu-Lam
- Edited by: Azrael Chung
- Music by: Chan Keung; Marco Wan
- Distributed by: China Star Entertainment Group; Kam & Ronson Enterprise Co (DVD)
- Release date: 31 January 2008
- Running time: 94 minutes
- Country: Hong Kong
- Language: Cantonese

Hong Kong Bronx (traditional Chinese: 黑勢力; simplified Chinese: 黑势力; pinyin: hei1 shi4 li4; Literal Title: Black Power; Cantonese Yale: Hak sai lik) is a 2008 Hong Kong action film directed by Billy Chung, and starring Jordan Chan and Annie Man. The film was produced by Wong Jing, whose father, Wong Tin-Lam, appears in a supporting role.

== Plot ==
Neil is a former Triad boss, who has just been released from prison. He attempts to starts his life anew by being a parental guide to his two sisters (Ada Wong, Vonnie Lui) and opening a repair shop. However, Neil meets Johnny a local merciless Triad kingpin.

== Cast ==
- Jordan Chan as Neil Shek
- Timmy Hung as Fai
- Kenny Wong as Bull
- Annie Man as Miss Watt
- Winnie Leung as Mabel
- Ricky Chan as Johnny
- Zuki Lee as Yo Yo
- Vonnie Lui as Bonnie
- Chan Hung Lit as SP Cheung
- Ada Wong Ji-Haam as Barbie
- Wong Tin-Lam as Uncle Bo
- Alan Chui Chung-San as Uncle Man

== Reception ==
=== Critical reception ===
Hong Kong Bronx was a seen by some critics as a retread of the Triad film genre. LoveHKFilm.com called it a "surprisingly watchable guilty pleasure," and criticized the film for its cheesy use of CGI blood.

=== Box office ===
Hong Kong Bronx was given a limited release in Hong Kong on 29 January 2008. It was shown in five theaters.
