= Sunny Chan =

Hong Kong actor

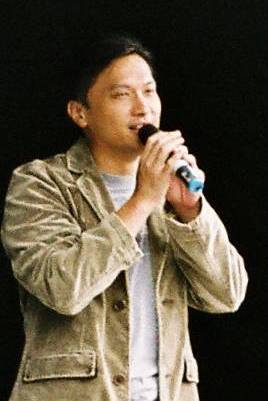
- Chan in the UK for a TVB-Europe event
- Born: 1 January 1967 (age 59); Hong Kong
- Occupation: Actor
- Spouse: Ada To (m. 2004)
- Children: Chan Ka-wah (b. 2 May 2007)

Chinese name
- Traditional Chinese: 陳錦鴻
- Simplified Chinese: 陈锦鸿
Transcriptions
Standard Mandarin
- Hanyu Pinyin: Chén Jǐnhóng
Yue: Cantonese
- Jyutping: Can4 Gam2 Hung4

Sunny Chan Kam-hung (born 1 January 1967) is a Hong Kong television and film actor.

== Career ==
His film role the 1998 Hong Kong film Hold You Tight was the role that made him well known to the Chinese and East Asian public, and for which he won the Silver Screen Award for Best Actor at the Singapore International Film Festival in 1998.

== Filmography ==
Film
Year	Film	Role	Notes
1990	Her Fatal Ways	Young man	extra
1991	The Blue Jean Monster		
1992	Three Summers	Lam	
1993	The Bride with White Hair 2	Feng Junjie	
1994	Naughty Couple	Henry Lo Chi-fung	
1994	The Modern Love	Siu-wong	
1995	Ghost House: A True Story	Eric	
1996	Scorpio	Tse Chi-fung	
1996	Tristar	Fa's partner	
1996	The Great Jetfoil Robbery		
1997	Destination: 9th Heaven		
1997	Troublesome Night	To Kar-ming	
1998	Hold You Tight	Fung Wai	Silver Screen Award for Best Actor
1998	Cheap Killers	Yat Tiu	
1998	The Love & Sex of the Eastern Hollywood	Ko Sing	
2000	Comeuppance	Cheung Chi-wah	
2000	The Enemy	Chan Hung-chun	
2001	Love Insurance	Ho Fu	
2002	Love in Garden Street	Roy	
2003	A Tragic Room	Lip Kwan	
2003	Hell-World Judge	Ha Fu-cho	
2004	One Eye Open		
2010	72 Tenants of Prosperity	Tailor Man	
Television
Year	Title	Role	Notes
1991	Shanghai 1949	Ba Zixuan	
1991	All Out of Love	Kong Wai-chung	
1992	Hong Kong Revisited	Masao Yamazaki	
1992	Why is My Teacher a Ghost?	Sze Tsun-nam	
1992	Spirit of the Dragon	Nakamura	
1992	Something Incredible: Labyrinth Murder	Ko Fai	TV movie
1993	The Silver Tycoon	Duen Hon-to	
1993	Why is My Teacher a Ghost 2	Sze Tsun-nam	
1993	Gun and Glory	Wu Kwan	
1995	When a Man Loves a Woman	Roy Wong Man-tak	Episode 7
1995	Justice Pao	Yeung Ka-po	Episode: Son's Revenge
1995	A Kindred Spirit	Fung Tsan-bong	Sitcom; Episodes 66–82
1995	The Criminal Investigator	Sergeant Lam Wing-tai	
1995	A Stage of Turbulence	Kiu Ho-kwong / Chan Yiu-cho	
1996	Once Upon a Time in Shanghai	Hui Man-keung	
1996	The Criminal Investigator II	Sergeant Lam Wing-tai	
1996	In the Name of Love	Ho Ka-lok	
1997	A Recipe for the Heart	Doctor Wong Luk	Guest appearance
1998	Secret of the Heart	Ching Ka-hung	
1999	The Flying Fox of Snowy Mountain	Wu Fei	
1999	Detective Investigation Files IV	Senior Inspector Kong Chi-shan	
1999–2000	At the Threshold of an Era	Michael Hui Man-piu	
2000	Battlefield Network	Fong Siu-lung	
2002	Reincarnated Love	Ching Chung-hon / Lee Sheung-yan	
2002	Jin Xiu Qiang Cheng	Feng Jianbo	
2005	Strike at Heart	Hui Siu-yat	Warehoused
2005	Just Love	Scott Kot Kwok-kwong	
2005	Tien Sheng Jue Pei Nao Fan Tian	Hong Yi	
2006	Bie Shuo Ai Qing Ku	Lu An	
2006	Placebo Cure	Man Ka-woh	
2006	Vagabond Vigilante	Yeung Muuk	
2006	Love Guaranteed	Ken Kwok Fu-keung	Nominated — TVB Anniversary Awards for Best Actor (Top 20); Nominated — TVB Anniversary Awards for My Favourite Male Character (Top 20)
2007	The Slicing of the Demon	To Sei-hoi	Warehoused
2007	War and Destiny	Poon Sai-cheung	
2007	The Green Grass of Home	"Caustic" Choi Kar-sing	Nominated — TVB Anniversary Awards for Best Actor (Top 20); Nominated — TVB Anniversary Awards for My Favourite Male Character (Top 24)
2007	ICAC Investigators 2007	Senior Inspector Sunny Leung Pak-wah	Episode: Iron Window Express
2007	Phoenix Rising	Yin Leung	
2008	Best Selling Secrets	Chan Chi-yin	Sitcom; Guest appearance (Episodes 240–41, 246, 250)
2008	Legend of the Demigods	An Hei	Nominated — TVB Anniversary Awards for My Favourite Male Character (Top 10)
2009	The Winter Melon Tale	Tin Tai-kwai	
2009	Just Love II	Scott Kot Kwok-kwong	
2009	A Chip Off the Old Block	Chor Fan	Nominated - My Favourite Male Character (Top 15)
2010	Ghost Writer	Ko Jit	
2011	Wax and Wane	Man Kar-fung	
2011	The Life and Times of a Sentinel	Shunzhi Emperor	Guest appearance
2011	River of Wine	Leung Ching-hong	
2011	Curse of the Royal Harem	Do-kwong Emperor	Nominated — TVB Anniversary Award for Best Actor (Top 15)
2012	The Greatness of a Hero	Constable Sung Ting-yuk	Warehoused
2013	The Day of Days	Sung Lai-wo	
2013	Chun Tian De Jiao Xing Jia	Ding Yichun	
2015	Doom +5		
2019	Till Death Do Us Part		
