= At Point Blank (TV series) =

Hong Kong television series

- 婚姻乏術
- Genre: Romantic drama
- Written by: Fong Wai-yee; Ho Kwan-ngo; Cheung Chi-yin; Wong Ho-yin; Ho Wing-nin
- Starring: Gallen Lo; Michael Tse; Kingdom Yuen; Louisa So; Myolie Wu; Mak Cheung-ching
- Theme music composer: Shu Man
- Opening theme: I Am Sometimes Afraid to Talk (我有時怕傾訴) by Gallen Lo
- Country of origin: Hong Kong
- Original language: Cantonese
- No. of episodes: 20

Production
- Producer: Wong Wai-sing
- Production location: Hong Kong
- Running time: 45 minutes per episode
- Production company: TVB

Original release
- Network: TVB Jade
- Release: 17 November – 14 December 2006

At Point Blank
- Traditional Chinese: 婚姻乏術
- Simplified Chinese: 婚姻乏术
- Literal meaning: "Marriage Lack Technique
Transcriptions
Standard Mandarin
- Hanyu Pinyin: Hūn Yīn Fá Shù
Yue: Cantonese
- Jyutping: Fan1 Jan1 Fat6 Seot6

At Point Blank is a Hong Kong romantic drama television series produced by TVB and starring Gallen Lo, Michael Tse, Kingdom Yuen and Louisa So. It was released overseas in August 2001 and premiered in Hong Kong on 17 November 2006.

== Cast ==
=== Main cast ===
- Gallen Lo as Lennon Law King-fai (羅景輝)
- Michael Tse as Bernard Chan Siu-ming (陳小明)
- Kingdom Yuen as Ching Hiu-nam (程曉男)
- Louisa So as Venessa Wan Yeung-yau (溫婉柔)
- Myolie Wu as Samantha Ching Hiu-kwan (程曉君)
- Mak Cheung-ching as Law Kai-fai (羅繼輝)

=== Other cast ===
- Fiona Yuen as Cherrian Yau Mei-suet (尤美雪)
- Kenny Wong as Lung Ng (龍五)
- Chow Chung as Ching Sam (程琛)
- Yu Yeung as Wan To (溫滔)
- Dickson Lee as Robin Lee Sai-man (李世民)
- Natalie Wong as Shum Man (沈玟)
- Rainbow Ching as Ching Leung Suk-yin (程梁淑賢)
- Felix Lok as Vincent Poon Wai-suen (潘偉遜)
- Russell Cheung as Apprentice of the divine doctor (神醫徒弟)
