= The Winter Melon Tale =

Hong Kong television series

- Official poster
- 大冬瓜
- Genre: Costume Drama
- Starring: Liu Kai Chi; Sunny Chan; Louisa So; Rain Lau; Nancy Wu
- Country of origin: Hong Kong
- Original language: Cantonese
- No. of episodes: 20

Production
- Running time: 45 minutes (approx.)

Original release
- Network: TVB
- Release: March 9 – April 3, 2009

The Winter Melon Tale
- Traditional Chinese: 大冬瓜
- Simplified Chinese: 大冬瓜
Transcriptions
Standard Mandarin
- Hanyu Pinyin: Dà Dōng Guā
Yue: Cantonese
- Jyutping: Daai^{6} Dung^{1} Gwaa^{1}

The Winter Melon Tale (Traditional Chinese: 大冬瓜, translated literally into Big Winter Melon) is a TVB costume drama series broadcast in March 2009.

== Synopsis ==
Fan Tung (Liu Kai Chi) is one of the four deities under the Stove God. He has offended the Queen Mother of the West of being ravenous and gets imprisoned for 500 years in the winter melon. By chance Tin Dai Kwai (Sunny Chan) and his wife Chung Bik Yuk (Louisa So) free him from constraint. Tung gets flattened by Kwai's older brother Tin Tai Fu (also played by Liu Kai Chi) accidentally and his spirit enters Fu's body inexplicably while losing all his instincts.

Tung starts living in Kwai's house and getting closer to the family. Yuk finds Tung suspicious and she tries to unmask him by all means. Having failed in his attempt to return to Heaven, Tung becomes reliant on the help of six little deities who assimilated his instincts released from the melon, and since then Tung is aware of the fickleness of human nature. One day, Fu's truant wife Ling Fung (Lau Yuk Chui) suddenly returns. She ruins everything and even causes the death of Kwai. In order to get his life back, Tung illicitly breaks into the netherworld.

== Cast ==
=== Peasants ===
Cast	Role	Description
Liu Kai Chi	Tin Dai-Fu 田大富	Tin Dai-Kwai's older brother. Ling Fung's husband.
Sunny Chan	Tin Dai-Kwai 田大貴	Tin Dai-Fu's younger brother. Chung Bik-Yuk's husband.
Louisa So	Chung Bik-Yuk 鍾碧玉	Tin Dai-Kwai's wife.
Rain Lau	Ling Fung 凌鳳	Tin Dai-Fu's sister-in-law
Ellesmere Choi	Wut Gei 屈機	Doctor; Chung Bik-Wun's husband.
Natalie Wong	Chung Bik-Wun 鍾碧雲	Wut Gei's wife. Chung Yiu-Jo and Chung Bik-Yuk's sister.
Jack Wu	Chung Yiu-Jo 鍾耀祖	Inventor; Chung Bik-Wun and Chung Bik-Yuk's younger brother.

=== Gods and Monsters ===
Cast	Role	Description
Liu Kai Chi	Fan Tung 范統	Stove God's Deity; Yuen Sa Sin-Tsi's husband.
Louisa So	Yuen Sa Sin-Tzi 浣紗仙子	Stove God's Deity; Fan Tung's wife.
Nancy Wu	Fok Sze-Sze 霍思思	Fox Spirit
Helen Tam	Wong Mo Leung-Leung 皇母娘娘	Queen Mother of the West

== Viewership ratings ==
	Week	Episode	Average Points	Peaking Points	References
1	March 9–13, 2009	1 — 5	27	29	
2	March 16–20, 2009	6 — 10	26	—	
3	March 23–26, 2009	11 — 14	26	—	
4	March 30 - April 2, 2009	15 — 19	27	—	
4	April 3, 2009	20	26	—	
