= ICAC Investigators =

Hong Kong television miniseries

ICAC Investigators (Chinese: 廉政行動) is a long-running family of Hong Kong television miniseries about the work of Hong Kong's Independent Commission Against Corruption (ICAC). The series are public awareness films produced by Radio Television Hong Kong or Television Broadcasts Limited, with the full co-operation of the ICAC itself. Each series dramatises real cases of the Commission and serves both to educate the populace against corrupt practises and as a public relations tool for the ICAC.

== History ==
The series have been part of ICAC's history since its infancy the first series of 13 episodes airing on Rediffusion Television in 1975. Corruption in Hong Kong at that time was endemic and pervaded all walks of life. Presenting its message in a cops and robbers dramatised form proved far more effective at delivering the message, that bribes and kickbacks were unacceptable, than just lecturing the populace.

== Series ==
Although usually produced by RTHK the series are usually aired by TVB, but also in the past Asia Television, since RTHK does not broadcast its own programs. The series usually consist of multiple stories, each usually told over the course of a single episode, based on real cases and take the form of a police procedural. The first installments of the series were broadcast under a variety different names with ICAC Investigators being the most recent and common name.

Date of Broadcast	Series name	Number of episodes	Broadcast notes
1975	The Quiet Revolution	13	First broadcast by Rediffusion Television the Predecessor of Asia Television; Thirty minute episodes
1978	ICAC	5 (7)	Initial broadcast by TVB, episodes 6 and 7 were not broadcast until 1999
1981	ICAC Vanguard 1981	7	First broadcast by TVB, rebroadcast in 1982 by Asia Television one double episode of an hour and thirty minutes one double episode of an hour and fifteen minutes
1985	ICAC Vanguard 1985	6	First broadcast by Asia Television, rebroadcast by TVB in 1986
17/07/1989	ICAC Vanguard 1989	13	First broadcast by TVB, rebroadcast in 1990 by Asia Television; Thirty minute episodes
18/02/1992	ICAC Investigators 1992	7	First broadcast by Asia Television in February, rebroadcast in the August of the same year by TVB; Three episodes of an hour each, and four half hour episodes
24/07/1994	ICAC Investigators 1994	5	First broadcast by TVB, broadcast to celebrate the 20th anniversary of the establishment of the ICAC
22/09/1996	ICAC Investigators 1996	5	First broadcast by TVB one double episode of an hour and thirty minutes
01/11/1998	ICAC Investigators 1998	5	First broadcast by TVB, broadcast to celebrate the 25th anniversary of the establishment of the ICAC
10/02/2001	The ICAC Investigators 2000	5	First broadcast by TVB
18/04/2004	ICAC Investigators 2004	5	First broadcast by TVB
01/09/2007- 29/09/2007	ICAC Investigators 2007	5	First broadcast by TVB
26/09/2009- 24/10/2009	ICAC Investigators 2009	5	First broadcast by TVB
05/11/2011- 03/12/2011	ICAC Investigators 2011	5	Produced by RTHK and first broadcast by TVB
29/03/2014- 03/05/2014	ICAC Investigators 2014	5	First broadcast by TVB; An hour and thirty minute episodes
23/04/2016- 21/05/2016	ICAC Investigators 2016	5	First broadcast by TVB
06/04/2019- 04/05/2019	ICAC Investigations 2019	5	First broadcast by TVB
01/05/2022- 29/05/2022	ICAC Investigators 2022	5	First broadcast by TVB
4th quarter 2024	ICAC Investigators 2024	5	First broadcast by TVB, broadcast to celebrate the 50th anniversary of the establishment of the ICAC
