= The Criminal Investigator =

- Official poster
- Genre: Police procedural Crime drama Action
- Created by: Jonathan Chik
- Screenplay by: Chow Yuk-ming; Tang Cho-san; Mang Wai-cheung; Wong Kin; Tsang Po-wah; Szeto Wai-cheuk
- Directed by: Law Tak-ming; Chu Yik-lung; Wong Chun-man; Mak Koon-chi; Chung Kwok-keung; Marco Law
- Starring: Felix Wong; Sunny Chan
- Theme music composer: John Laudon
- Opening theme: "烈火狂奔" (lit. Prancing in the Fires) performed by Jacky Cheung
- Country of origin: Hong Kong
- Original language: Cantonese
- No. of episodes: 21

Production
- Producer: Jonathan Chik
- Production location: Hong Kong
- Camera setup: Multi camera
- Running time: 42 minutes (each)
- Production company: TVB

Original release
- Network: TVB Jade
- Release: 7 July – 29 July 1995

Related
- The Criminal Investigator II

The Criminal Investigator (Traditional Chinese: O記實錄; lit. 'The O Files') is a 1995 Hong Kong police procedural television drama. Produced by Jonathan Chik with a screenplay co-written and edited by Chow Yuk-ming, the drama is a TVB production. The story follows a team of investigators from the Organized Crime and Triad Bureau (OCTB) unit of the Royal Hong Kong Police Force.

== Characters ==
=== OCTB unit ===
==== Team A ====
Rank	Role	Cast
Chief Superintendent	Ho Tsan-yeung (何鎮洋)	Wong Wai
Superintendent	Jeff Chan Kwai (陳桂)	Choi Kwok-kuen
Senior Inspector	Teddy Ng Kwok-siu (吳國兆)	Chan Wing-tsun
Sergeant	Wong Chi-chung (王志淙)	Felix Wong
Sergeant	Lam Wing-tai (林永泰)	Sunny Chan
Senior Police Constable	Chu Yat-lung (朱日隆)	Yu Tin-wai
Senior Police Constable	Szeto Man-on (司徒文安)	Joe Ma
Police Constable	Wu Sau-fat (胡守法)	Shum Po-sze
Police Constable	Tsui Pui-lam (徐沛霖)	Ng man-wai
Police Constable	Yip Fai (葉輝)	King Kong Lam
Criminal Attorney from Department of Justise	Rita Yu Ching-wan (余靖允)	Yvonne Lam

=== Other characters ===
- Kenix Kwok as Kenes Ng Chung-lin (伍頌蓮)
- Bondy Chiu as Bonnie Wong Ming-wai (王明慧)
- Lau Siu-ming as Wong Hong-kwai (王康貴)
- Pak Yan as Lai Kit-yu (黎潔如)
- Choi Kwok-hing as Lam Sam (林森)
- Soh Hang-suen as Ho Mei-ying (何英瑛)
