= Chong Wai-kin =

Hong Kong television producer and director

- Born: Hong Kong
- Occupation(s): Television producer, director
- Years active: 1985–present

Chinese name
- Traditional Chinese: 莊偉建
- Simplified Chinese: 庄伟建
Transcriptions

Chong Wai-kin is a Hong Kong television producer and director.

He first entered Asia Television (ATV) as a director and producer for the channel's television dramas. In 1989, he moved to Television Broadcasts Limited (TVB) and has stayed in the company ever since. He is known for producing many of TVB's grand-production television dramas, such as Revelation of the Last Hero (1992), A Step into the Past (2001), and Born Rich (2009).

== Filmography ==
=== As producer ===
Year	Title	Chinese title	Actors	Notes
1985		濟公		
1985		魅力九龍塘		
1986		阿水先生		
1986	The Adventurers	冒險家樂園	Wong Yue, Candice Yu, Charlie Cho	
1986		清末四大奇案	Lee Ching-shan, Ngai Chau-wah, Yip Yuk-ping	
1986		時光倒流70年		
1987		大銅鑼		
1987		鐵血藍天		
1988		愛火奔流		
1988		賽金花	Leanne Liu, Pat Poon, Lee Ching-shan, Wong Wai, Pao Hon-lam	
1990	Kim Mo Tuk Ku Kau Pai	劍魔獨孤求敗	Felix Wong, Maggie Shiu, Man Shuet-yee, Hugo Ng	
1990		玉面飛狐		
1991		打工貴族		
1991		鐵血男兒		
1991	The Sword of Conquest	鐵血男兒	Eddie Kwan, Kathy Chow, Liza Wang, Law Kar-ying, Ng Si-tak, Dickson Lee, Rain Lau	
1992	The Commandments	武林幸運星	Vivian Chow, Deric Wan, Cutie Mui, Wu Yueh-shan, Lisa Lui, Tsui Ga-bo	
1992	Revelation of the Last Hero	風之刀 / 武林啟示錄之風之刀	Aaron Kwok, Ada Choi, Noel Leung, Fennie Yuen, Frankie Lam, Bryan Leung	
1993	The Link	天倫	Eddie Kwan, Gigi Lai, Amy Kwok, Dominic Lam, David Siu, Ada Choi, Lily Chung, Josephine Lam, Cheung Yick	
1994	The Condor Heroes Returns	射鵰英雄傳之南帝北丐	Ekin Cheng, Marco Ngai, Wong Siu-yin, Charine Chan, Chan Wai-yee, Wayne Lai	
1994	Heartstrings	烈火狂奔	Aaron Kwok, Gigi Lai, Fennie Yuen, Jimmy Wong, Mark Cheng, Melvin Wong	
1995	Justice Pao	包青天	Ti Lung, Felix Wong, Liu Kai-chi	
1996	Night Journey	殭屍福星	Yuen Wah, Cheung Kwok-keung, Louisa So, Daniel Chan, Halina Tam, Chor Yuen	
1997		孝感動天	Gallen Lo, Marco Ngai, Ada Choi, Lau Kong, Law Lok-lam, Kong Ngai, Derek Kok	
1997	Drunken Angles	男人四十打功夫	Yuen Wah, Mariane Chan	
1999	Happy Ever After	金玉滿堂	Bobby Au-yeung, Mariane Chan, Kwong Wa, Nnadia Chan, Roger Kwok, Fiona Leung	
2000	The Legend of Lady Yang	楊貴妃	Anne Heung, Kwong Wa, Florence Kwok, Melissa Ng, Savio Tsang, Fiona Yuen	
2000	Aiming High	撻出愛火花	Nicholas Tse, Yuen Wah, Fiona Leung, Nicola Cheung, Hawick Lau, Cindy Au	
2001	The Heaven Sword and Dragon Sabre	倚天屠龍記	Lawrence Ng, Gigi Lai, Charmaine Sheh, Damian Lau, Michelle Yim	
2001	A Step into the Past	尋秦記	Louis Koo, Kwong Wa, Jessica Hsuan, Sonija Kwok, Raymond Lam, Joyce Tang, Michelle Saram, Waise Lee, Sicney Yim	Louis Koo for TVB Anniversary Award for Best Actor
2002	Invisible Journey	彩色世界	Bowie Lam, Jessica Hsuan, Joyce Tang	
2002	Love and Again	駁命老公追老婆	Alex Fong, Sonija Kwok, Moses Chan, Michael Tse, Fiona Yuen, Angela Tong, Leila Tong	
2003	Vigilante Force	智勇新警界	Bowie Lam, Joe Ma, Kenix Kwok, Benny Chan, Eileen Yeow, Tavia Yeung	Tavia Yeung for TVB Anniversary Award for Most Improved Actress
2003	The Legend of Love	牛郎織女	Deric Wan, Sonija Kwok	
2004	Twin of Brothers	大唐雙龍傳	Raymond Lam, Ron Ng, Tavia Yeung, Leila Tong, Christine Ng, Li Qian, Nancy Wu	Ron Ng for TVB Anniversary Award for Most Improved Male Artiste
2005	Just Love	老婆大人	Jessica Hsuan, Sunny Chan, Dave Wang, Patrick Tang, Johnson Lee, Selena Li, Fiona Yuen, Natalie Tong	
2005	Misleading Track	奪命真夫	Bowie Lam, Deric Wan, Louisa So, Christine Ng	
2005	Real Kung Fu	佛山贊師父	Yuen Biao, Maggie Shiu, Bryan Leung, Gordon Liu, Jack Wu, Timmy Hung, Charmaine Li, Selena Li	
2006	Maidens' Vow	鳳凰四重奏	Charmaine Sheh, Joe Ma, Sammul Chan	Charmaine Sheh for TVB Anniversary Award for Best Actress
2007	War and Destiny	亂世佳人	Ron Ng, Myolie Wu, Sunny Chan, Leila Tong	
2007	The Slicing of the Demon	凶城計中計	Sunny Chan, Michael Tse, Bernice Liu, Elliot Ngok, Angela Tong	
2008	Wasabi Mon Amour	和味濃情	Michael Tao, Louisa So, Bernice Liu, Paul Chun, Dexter Yeung, Joyce Tang	
2008	Catch Me Now	原來愛上賊	Damian Lau, Joe Ma, Idy Chan, Fala Chen	
2009	Just Love II	老婆大人II	Jessica Hsuan, Sunny Chan, Joyce Tang, Johnson Lee, Natalie Tong, Benz Hui	
2009	Born Rich	富貴門	Ray Lui, Gallen Lo, Joe Ma, Anita Yuen, Kenix Kwok, Jaime Chik, Nancy Sit, Benz Hui, Lau Siu-ming, Kenneth Ma, Sharon Chan	
2011	The Rippling Blossom	魚躍在花見	Julian Cheung, Michael Tse, Myolie Wu, Damian Lau, Tavia Yeung, Lisa Lui, Ngo Ka-nin	
2011	Lives of Omission	潛行狙擊	Michael Tse, Bosco Wong, Fala Chen, Kate Tsui, Damian Lau, Cheung Kwok-keung, Elena Kong, Ben Wong, Derek Kok	TVB Anniversary Award for Best Drama
2011	Curse of the Royal Harem	萬凰之王	Jessica Hsuan, Myolie Wu, Sunny Chan, Joel Chan, Nancy Wu, Gigi Wong, Elena Kong, Sire Ma, etc.	Myolie Wu for TVB Anniversary Award for Best Actress
2012	Silver Spoon, Sterling Shackles	名媛望族	Damian Lau, Idy Chan, Kenneth Ma, Tavia Yeung, Ron Ng, Rebecca Zhu, Elena Kong, Mary Hon, Sire Ma, Vincent Wong, JJ Jia, Shek Sau, Ben Wong, etc.	Tavia Yeung for TVB Anniversary Award for Best Actress
2013	Always and Ever	情逆三世緣	Bobby Au-yeung, Esther Kwan, Ngo Ka-nin, Ben Wong, Mandy Wong, Rebecca Zhu, Benjamin Yuen, Christine Kuo, Derek Kok, etc.	
2014	The Ultimate Addiction	點金勝手	Bosco Wong, Nancy Wu, Kate Tsui, Ben Wong, Sharon Chan, Elena Kong, MC Jin, Toby Leung, Jazz Lam	
2015	Limelight Years	華麗轉身	Liza Wang, Damian Lau, Linda Chung, Alex Fong Lik-sun	
TBA	Recipes to Live By	味想天開	Tony Hung, Sisley Choi, Hugo Wong, Rebecca Zhu, Stephanie Ho, Toby Leung, Maria Cordero	
TBA	Destiny	天命	Ruco Chan, Selena Li, Natalie Tong, Tony Hung, Lai Lok-yi, Joel Chan, Frankie Choi	
