= Root of all evil =

Root of all evil or Root of evil may refer to:

== Music ==
- The Root of All Evil (album), a 2009 album by Swedish death metal band Arch Enemy
- The Root of All Evil (EP), Japanese work by all-female tribute band Iron Maidens
- "The Root of All Evil", part of the Twelve-step Suite and the first track of the album Octavarium, by Dream Theater
- "The Root of All Evil", a song by The Beautiful South
- "The Root of All Evil", a song by Snoop Doggy Dogg from Death Row: The Lost Sessions Vol. 1
- "Root of All Evil", a song by The Underachievers from their debut mixtape Indigoism
- "Money Is the Root of All Evil", a 1940s song by Whitney and Kramer, featured in the film High Time
- "Root of all Evil", a 2025 song by Daniel Caesar from the album Son of Spergy

== Film, television and radio ==
- Root of Evil: The True Story of the Hodel Family and the Black Dahlia, a 2019 podcast about an unsolved murder
- The Root of Evil (film), 1912 silent short film directed by D. W. Griffith
- The Root of All Evil (1947 film), British drama starring Phyllis Calvert and Michael Rennie
- The Root of All Evil? (1968 TV series), British anthology TV series
- "The Root of All Evil" (Lady Killers), 1981 episode of Lady Killers
- The Root of All Evil?, a 2006 UK television documentary, retitled The God Delusion discussing religious faith and starring Richard Dawkins
- Lewis Black's Root of All Evil, a television series aired on Comedy Central featuring comedian Lewis Black
- Born Rich (TV series), 2009 Hong Kong television drama known as Root of Evil in the original Cantonese
- "The Root of Evil" (Amphibia), an episode of Amphibia
- "The Root of All Evil" (Battle for Dream Island), a 2026 web series episode
- "The Root of All Evil" (Drop the Dead Donkey), a TV comedy episode

== Other ==
- The Root of Evil, 1911 novel by Thomas Dixon, Jr.
- "The Root of All Evil", a short story by Graham Greene
- The Root of All Evil, a User Friendly webcomic compilation book alluding to the Unix concept of the root user
- Roots of Evil (Ravenloft), 1993 supplement for the role-playing game Advanced Dungeons & Dragons
- The Root of All Evil (D&D Adventure), 2001 supplement for the role-playing game Dungeons & Dragons
- Death Jr. II: Root of Evil, 2008 action-adventure game for PlayStation Portable
- Good and evil, philosophical concept often involving the "root of all evil"
- Love of money, Christian biblical concept; according to 1 Timothy 6:10 "For the love of money is the root of all of evil"

== See also ==
- Route of All Evil (disambiguation)
