= The Rippling Blossom =

Hong Kong television series

- 魚躍在花見
- Genre: Romantic drama
- Screenplay by: Wong Yeung-tat; Yip Tin-shing; Law Pui-ching; Cheung Ying-wai; Lai Sin-yee; Fung Ching-man; Connie Pun
- Directed by: Joe Chan; Yip Chun-gai; Chung Kwok-keung; Lee Shu-fan
- Starring: Julian Cheung; Michael Tse; Myolie Wu; Damian Lau; Tavia Yeung; Lisa Lui; Ngo Ka-nin; Angelina Lo
- Theme music composer: Roy Chow
- Opening theme: How Deep is the Ocean (究竟海有幾深) by Julian Cheung
- Country of origin: Hong Kong
- Original language: Cantonese
- No. of episodes: 19 (Hong Kong); 20 (Overseas)

Production
- Producer: Chong Wai-kin
- Production locations: Hong Kong; Hokkaido, Japan; Tokyo, Japan
- Running time: 45 minutes
- Production company: TVB

Original release
- Network: TVB Jade
- Release: 7 February – 4 March 2011

The Rippling Blossom
- Traditional Chinese: 魚躍在花見
- Simplified Chinese: 鱼跃在花见
- Literal meaning: "The Flying Fish in Hanami"
Transcriptions
Standard Mandarin
- Hanyu Pinyin: Yú Yuè Zài Huā Jiàn
Yue: Cantonese
- Jyutping: Jyu4 Jeok6 Zoi6 Faa1 Gin3

The Rippling Blossom is a 2011 Hong Kong romantic drama series produced by TVB and starring Julian Cheung, Michael Tse, Myolie Wu, Damian Lau and Tavia Yeung. The premiere episode aired on 7 February 2011 on TVB Jade.

It was filmed from 25 October 2009 to 20 January 2010. Filming locations included Hokkaido, as well as Tokyo and Hong Kong.

== Synopsis ==
A Hong Kong dining mogul leaves behind a sushi restaurant to his second wife, Kong Ying-yuet (Lisa Lui), their son, Yue Chi-hiu (Michael Tse) and the son from his third wife, Yue Chi-ying (Julian Cheung).

Hiu and Ying are remarkable Japanese cuisine chefs whose main aim in life is to pursue excellence in cuisine. Although Hiu and Ying are half-brothers, they get along very well.

When their father's first wife, Lang Yung-yung (Angelina Lo), creates trouble for the restaurant, Hiu declares to challenge her, claiming whoever wins will have the restaurant.

Yung sends her personal nurse, Choi Sze-lung (Tavia Yeung) to get close to Hiu. He is completely smitten by love for her but soon becomes unhappy with their lukewarm relationship.

On the other hand, their supply for fresh food has been shut out. Ying has to make a trip to Hokkaido, Japan to buy fish. He meets Keung Keung (Myolie Wu), a willful girl from a wealthy family on the plane. They also meet Mo-yung Ching (Damian Lau) who is known as "The God of Fish" in the market. As the relationship between Ying and Keung Keung grows, she finds out that Mo-yung Ching is her long lost father. Mo-yung Ching becomes Ying's mentor and helps him through the competition to win the first overseas Japanese restaurant franchise in Hong Kong. As Ying's career grows, Hiu becomes more jealous of his brother and starts to scheme with Choi Sze-lung to get his father's fortunes.

As Hiu and Ying have setbacks in their career, family and their loved ones after their attempt to save the restaurant, the brothers decide to have a competition. Hiu removes his jealousy of Ying and holds a placid mood to take part in this fair competition. When the judge is going to announce the final result, Ying receives a call that says Keung Keung suffered an accident and now she is in hospital. Ying immediately leaves the competition without knowing the result. Keung Keung recovers after several days. Then, Hiu tells Ying that Ying is the winner in last competition and he is proud of him.

== Cast ==
=== The Yue family ===
- Felix Lok as Yue Fai-wong (魚輝煌), Chi-hiu, Chi-ying and Chi-po's deceased father and founder of the Emperor Food Corporation. On time during a traffic accident, Fai-wong ran over and killed Sze-lung's father and commended Chi-hiu to send a check with a large some of money to Sze-lung's mother, Hong Nai-hing, to compensate to their family to not prosecute him, and gifts Chi-hiu the January Otaki Japanese Restaurant, a subsidiary restaurant of Emperor Corporation.
- Angelina Lo as Lang Yung-yung (冷雍容), the chairperson of Emperor Food Corporation whom is Fai-wong's first wife and mother of Chi-po. She highly despises Ying-yuet, Chiu-hiu and Chi-ying, often challenging them with dirty tricks. She initially acts tyrannical towards her personal nurse, Sze-lung, but they eventually settle their differences and when she develops cancers, she entrusts Sze-lung to take care of her intellectually disabled son, Chi-po. Yung-yung eventually dies from organ failure in episode 15.
- Lisa Lui as Kong Ying-yuet (江映月), Chi-hiu's mother and Chi-ying's stepmother whom highly cherishes her family. Despite her weak character, she would show off her persistent side in order to protect her family.
- Michael Tse as Yue Chi-hiu (魚至囂), Fai-wong and Ying-yuet's eldest son whom is a master chef and owner of the January Otaki Japanese Restaurant. Due to his family environment, Chi-hiu is confident, arrogant, has a high sense of responsibility and is highly self-critical and rather egoistic. He is Yung-yung's nemesis and is often challenged by her. One time during a confrontation with Yung-yung, Chi-hiu meets Sze-lung and they fall in love. When Sze-lung was told falsely by Yung-yung that Chi-hiu was the murderer of his father, Chi-hiu was betrayed by Sze-lung in two competitions where he injures his hand and loses his restaurant. Feeling bitter, Chi-hiu schemes with Sze-lung and unscrupulously claims the position as CEO of Emperor Food Corporation. Chi-hiu also feels bitter of his brother Chi-ying when the latter was able to improve his sushi-making skills when Chi-hiu was recovering from his hand injury and forces Chi-ying into a competition with him where he strikes a heavy blow to Chi-ying's self-esteem.
- Julian Cheung as Yue Chi-ying (魚至嬴), a junior chef who works at his older brother's restaurant as his apprentice. Having a completely opposite personality as his brother, Chi-ying is optimistic, enthusiastic, easygoing and playful. Since Chi-ying is always curious of people around him, he is unable to work consistently and is often scolded by his brother. Despite contrasting personalities, Chi-ying gets along well with his brother and highly respects him for his talent and skills. Chi-ying's mother died at young age and he was raised by Yuet-ying, whom treats Chi-ying like his own son. While on a trip to Hokkaido, he meets rich heiress Keung Keung and they become friendly rivals. In Hokkaido, Chi-ying also meets seafood merchandiser Mo-yung Ching, who takes him as his pupil and teaches him his knowledge of fish, helping Chi-ying win a competition where he was substituting for his brother who had injured his hand, and wins the ownership of a new restaurant, Isushi. As Chi-ying's sushi-making skills improves, his brother becomes insanely jealous and sets a trap to strike Chi-ying's self-esteem. While Chi-ying was shattered, Keung Keung stuck by his side the whole time and they eventually develop feeling for one another.
- Ngo Ka-nin as Yue Chi-po (魚至寶), Fai-wong and Yung-yung's intellectually disabled son and Chi-hiu and Chi-ying's younger half-brother. His intellectual disabilities was caused by a fever as a child, giving him the mentality of a ten-year-old child. Due to his mentality, however, he is able to live a happy life. He has a good relationship with his second older brother Chi-ying, while his older brother Chi-hiu, looks down upon him. Chi-po loves Sze-lung and Sze-lung reluctantly agrees to marry him to help Chi-hiu claim the position as CEO of Emperor Food Corporation.

=== The Mo-yung family ===
- Damian Lau as Mo-yung Ching (慕容澄), a seafood merchandiser residing in Hokkaido. During his youth, Ching followed his father to Hokkaido to make a living as a fisherman. Ching offended local tyrants and was suppressed by competitors. Felling dejected, he turned to alcoholism, which led his wife to leave him with their two-year-old daughter. Ching then quits alcohol, hoping his wife and daughter would return to him, and becomes a seafood merchandiser. He has a unique vision of distinguishing fish types and earns the title as "The God of Fish" in the fish market. One day, Ching meets Chi-ying at the fish market and seeing great potential, Ching decides to take him as his pupil and teaches his knowledge. When he meets Chi-ying, he also gets to meet Keung Keung and feels a sense of kinship with her before discovering that she is in fact his long-lost daughter.
- Myolie Wu as Keung Keung (姜羌), born Mo-yung Kei (慕容咲), a food critic. Keung grew in a wealthy family and was loved by her parents like a princess. Although kind-hearted in nature, she often expresses in the wrong way, making her seem like a trouble maker. She also has a strong sense of pride, always keeping up her appearance to cover up her predicament. One time, Keung's parents owed a large debt and fled, leaving her homeless and tells her the truth that she was an adopted child. Fortunately, she meets Chi-ying at that time, whom takes her in to his home and teachers her how to live like a common civilian, much to the annoyance of Chi-hiu. Later, Keung follows Chi-hiu and Chi-ying to Hokkaido to participate in a competition and there, she meets Mo-yung Ching, where he discovers Keung to be his daughter, but keeps it a secret. When Keung also discovers this, she was initially unwilling to forgive her father until Chi-ying steps in and helps them reconcile. Keung then develops feeling for Chi-ying after all he had done for her and during the time when Chi-ying fell out with his brother, she helps him regain his fighting spirit.

=== The Choi family ===
- Chan Wing-chun as Mr. Choi (賽生), Hong Nai-hing'd deceased husband and Choi Sze-lung's deceased father who was run over and killed by Yue Fai-wong during a traffic accident.
- Mary Hon as Hong Nai-hing (康秀馨), Mr. Choi's wife and Choi Sze-lung and Sze-long's mother. When her husband was killed, she accepted Chi-hiu's check of a large amount of money as compensation for her husband's death and to not prosecute Fai-wong. Nai-hing suffers from liver cancer and succumbs to her disease in episode 13.
- Tavia Yeung as Choi Sze-long (賽思蘢), Mr. Choi and Hong Nai-hing's daughter who worked as Lang Yung-yung's private. Lang Yung-yung initially acted tyrannical towards her, but Sze-lung eventually gained her trust and remained loyal to her. Later, Sze-lung meets Chi-hiu and they fall in love. However, Yung-yung later falsely informs Sze-long that Chi-hiu was the murderer of her father and works as a spy for Yung-yung and betrays Chi-hiu twice. However, Sze-lung eventually discovers the truth about her father's death, making her feel insanely guilty of what she had done to Chi-hiu. Wanting to make it up to Chi-hiu, Sze-lung helps him to claim the position as the position as CEO of Emperor Food Corporation, which includes marrying Chi-po, whom she has no feelings for. She continues to let Chi-hiu to take advantage of her for him to gain power but when she sees Chi-hiu abusing his power to tackle his brother, she feels heartbroken to see that the man she loves has gone renegade.
- Ken Hung as Choi Sze-long (賽思朗), Sze-lung's younger brother whom recently returned to Hong Kong after studying abroad. He is aboveboard, open-minded, approachable, straightforward and dislikes stubborn thoughts. With the help of his sister, he secures a job in Emperor Food Corporation, enjoying the challenge he faces rather than the money he earns. Due to his upright nature, he disagrees with his sister's values, and believes there is no need to distinguish between himself and enemies. Despite this, he still respects his sister.

=== January Otaki / Isushi Japanese restaurant ===
- Michael Tse as Yue Chi-hiu (魚至囂), master chef and owner of January Otaki restaurant. See The Yue family
- Julian Cheung as Yue Chi-ying (魚至嬴), junior chef of January Otaki restaurant and owner and master chef of Isuhsi restaurant. See The Yue family
- Eric Li as Wing Tin (榮田), master chef of January Otaki restaurant and later, of Isushi restaurant.
- Benjamin Yuen as Nin Kei-sai (年紀細), junior chef of January Otaki restaurant and later, of Ishushi restaurant.
- Bruce Li as Tai Kwong (戴廣), manager of Ishui restaurant.
- Yaka Fu as Mei-ying (美瑛), staff member of Isushi restaurant.
- Lori Chow as Yeuk-na (若娜), staff member at Isushi restaurant.
- Adam Yip as Fu-leung (富良), waiter at Isushi restaurant.
- Alan Luk as Sap-sing (十勝), waiter at Isushi restaurant.
- Jerry Koo as Brother Tat (達哥), staff member of January Otaki restaurant.
- GoGo Cheung as Lai-shu (麗舒), staff member of January Otaki restaurant.
- Hoffman Cheng as Tong Ho-ming (唐浩鳴), staff member of January Otaki restaurant.

=== Other cast ===
- Cheung Kwok-keung as Tong Ngo (唐奧), a renowned food critic and food wholesaler.
- Eileen Yeow as Yoshiho Tin (田嘉穗), an antique shop owner, who is friendly, clever, refined, attentive and energetic. She is Mo-ying Ching's landlady and despite so, she often helps him do his chores. She met Ching at a young age and had greatly admired him since. Despite their age differences, Yoshiho has had feelings for Ching for a long time, although Ching sees her as a child. Later, Yoshiho was willing to leave everything behind in Hokkaido and follow Ching back to Hong Kong and also helps him mend his relationship with his daughter. Touched by her sincerity, Ching finally accepts her as his girlfriend
- Jimmy Au as Yau Yik-hong (游亦匡), Lang Yung-yung's personal assistant, but despite this, he is rather loyal to the corporation than to Yung-yung, as he was entrusted by Fai-wong to look after his sons and Yik-hong cares for their well-being.
- Ko Chun-man as Keung Keung's adopted father
- Ceci So as Keung Keung's adopted mother
- Lee Fung as Chiyoko' (千代子), a friend of Keung Keung's deceased mother.
- Lily Li as Shirakawa Riko (白河莉子), Chiyoko's older sister who suffers from amnesia.

== Awards and nominations ==
- 2011 TVB Anniversary Awards
  - Nominated: Best Drama
  - Nominated: Best Actor (Julian Cheung)
  - Nominated: Best Actress (Tavia Yeung)
  - Nominated: My Favourite Male Character (Julian Cheung)

== Viewership ratings ==
	Week	Episodes	Average Points	Peaking Points	References
1	February 7–11, 2011	1 — 5	29	31	
2	February 14–17, 2011	6 — 9	30	33	
3	February 21–25, 2011	10 — 14	31	—	
4	February 28–March 4, 2011	15 — 20	32	38	
4	March 4, 2011	19 — 20	34	38	

== Related series ==
- Wasabi Mon Amour
