= Vigilante Force (TV series) =

Hong Kong television series

- 智勇新警界
- Genre: Modern Action; Police thriller Drama
- Written by: Sit Ka Wah; Tong Kin Ping
- Starring: Bowie Lam; Kenix Kwok; Joe Ma; Benny Chan; Tavia Yeung; Leila Tong; Mak Cheung-ching; Eileen Yeow
- Theme music composer: Wong Seung Wai
- Opening theme: "一字馬" by Bowie Lam
- Country of origin: Hong Kong
- Original language: Cantonese
- No. of seasons: 1
- No. of episodes: 30

Production
- Executive producer: Chong Wai-kin
- Production location: Hong Kong
- Production company: Television Broadcasts Limited

Original release
- Network: TVB Jade
- Release: 24 March – 2 May 2003

Vigilante Force
- Traditional Chinese: 智勇新警界
- Simplified Chinese: 智勇新警界
- Literal meaning: "Bravest New Police World"
Transcriptions
Standard Mandarin
- Hanyu Pinyin: Zǐ Yǒng Xīn Jǐng Jiè
Yue: Cantonese
- Jyutping: Zi3 Jung5 San1 Ging2 Gaai3

Vigilante Force is a 2003 Hong Kong modern serial drama produced by TVB starring Bowie Lam, Kenix Kwok, Joe Ma, Benny Chan, Tavia Yeung, Leila Tong, Mak Cheung-ching, and Eileen Yeow.

== Cast ==
=== Main cast ===
| Cast | Role | Description |
|---|---|---|
| Bowie Lam | Fong Nga Chai 方瓦仔 | Northern New Territories Crime Investigation Dept. Sergeant; Wan Ka Lei's husband Luk Ying Yan's childhood friend |
| Kenix Kwok | Luk Ying Yan (Natalie) 陸迎璋 | Emergency Dept. Doctor; Ma Hau Yin's wife Fong Nga Chai's childhood friend Howard's ex-girlfriend |
| Joe Ma | Ma Hau Yin (Ken) 馬孝賢 | Northern New Territories Crime Investigation Dept. Inspector; Luk Ying Yan's husband |
| Benny Chan | To Chin Hung 陶展雄 | Northern New Territories Crime Investigation Dept. Senior Constable; Undercover police Lau Yuk Yan's husband |
| Tavia Yeung | Wan Ka Lei (Kelly) 溫嘉莉 | Wan Kin Yan's younger sister Fong Nga Cha's wife Howard's ex-girlfriend |
| Leila Tong | Luk Lai Kuen 陸麗娟 | Luk Kin Mo and Hung Ching Kei's daughter |
| Mak Cheung-ching | Luk Chan Ying 陸振英 | Killed Rocky, Wan Kin Yan and Chan Sau Yung; Fong Nga Chai & To Chin Hung childhood friend (Main Villain) |
| Eileen Yeow | Lau Yuk Yan 劉玉欣 | To Chin Hung's wife Fong Nga Chai's ex-girlfriend |

=== Police ===
| Cast | Role | Description |
|---|---|---|
| Samuel Kwok (郭峰) | Wong Ka Wah 王嘉華 | Fong Nga Chai and Ma Hau Yin's superior Superintendent Police; Head of Northern New Territories Crime Investigation Dept. Fong Yee Kiu's old friend turned husband |
| Ng Ngai Cheung (吳毅將) | Chan Sau Yung 陳修勇 | Northern New Territories Crime Investigation Dept. Chief Inspector; Betrayed the police force and corrupted police kill a traffic police Beaten to death by Luk Chan Ying in episode 29 (Villain) |
| Lam King Kong (林敬剛) | Yue Chi Yung 余志勇 | Northern New Territories Crime Investigation Dept. Constable |
| Belinda Hamnett | Law On On 羅安安 | Northern New Territories Crime Investigation Dept. Constable |
| Wong Ching (王青) | Kwok Kwai Sing 郭貴成 | Northern New Territories Crime Investigation Dept. Constable |

=== Other cast ===
| Cast | Role | Description |
|---|---|---|
| Law Koon Lan (羅冠蘭) | Fong Yee Kiu 方宜嬌 | Fong Nga Chai's aunt Wong Ka Wah's old friend turned wife |
| Siu Leung (蕭亮) | Luk Sing Cho 陸承祖 | Village leader Luk Ying Yan's father |
| Eddy Ko | Luk Kin Mo 陸建武 | Hung Ching Kei's husband Luk Lai Kuen's father |
| Mary Hon | Hung Ching Kei 洪靜琪 | Luk Kin Mo's wife Ma Ying Kit's ex-wife Ma Hau Yin and Luk Lai Kuen's mother |
| Derek Kwok | Wan Kin Yan 溫健仁 | Wan Ka Lei's older brother Killed by Luk Chan Ying in episode 19 |
| Wilson Tsui (艾威) | Rocky | Businessman/Gang Leader; Shot to death by Luk Chan Ying in episode 15 (Semi-Villain) |
| Mark Kwok | Howard | Luk Ying Yan and Wan Ka Lei's ex-boyfriend Died in a car accident |
| Kong Hon (江漢) | Ma Ying Kit 馬英傑 | Hung Ching Kei's ex-husband Ma Hau Yin's father |
| Ron Ng | Firecracker 炮仗 | Rocky and Luk Chan Ying's underling |

== Awards and nominations ==
- TVB Anniversary Awards (2003)
  - Won: My Top 12 Favourite Television Characters (Bowie Lam)
