= Silver Spoon, Sterling Shackles =

2012 Hong Kong television drama

- Promo poster
- 名媛望族
- Genre: Period drama
- Written by: Au Koon-ying; Lo Mei-wun
- Starring: Damian Lau; Idy Chan; Tavia Yeung; Kenneth Ma; Ron Ng; Rebecca Zhu; Mary Hon; Elena Kong; Vincent Wong; Ben Wong; Sire Ma; Adrian Chau
- Opening theme: At This Very Moment (此時此刻) by Fiona Sit
- Ending theme: Sometimes (有時) by Ron Ng
- Country of origin: Hong Kong
- Original languages: Cantonese; English
- No. of episodes: 40

Production
- Executive producer: Chong Wai-kin
- Production locations: Hong Kong; Shanghai, China
- Camera setup: Multi camera
- Production company: Television Broadcasts Limited

Original release
- Network: Jade; HD Jade
- Release: October 22 – December 14, 2012

Silver Spoon, Sterling Shackles
- Chinese: 名媛望族
- Literal meaning: "prominent family of high status women"
Transcriptions
Standard Mandarin
- Hanyu Pinyin: Míng Yuàn Wàng Zú
Yue: Cantonese
- Jyutping: Ming4 Wun4 Mong6 Zuk6

Silver Spoon, Sterling Shackles is a 2012 Hong Kong television drama produced by Television Broadcasts Limited (TVB) under executive producer Chong Wai-kin. The drama follows the lives of a large, rich, and influential Chinese family living in 1920s and 1930s colonial Hong Kong.

== Cast and characters ==
=== Chung family (鍾家) ===
- Damian Lau portrays Sir Arthur Chung Cheok-man, JP (鍾卓萬; jyutping: Zung Ceokmaan) the patriarch of the Chung family with four wives; the first ethnic Chinese barrister.
- Mary Hon as Koo Sam-lan (顧心蘭; Gu Samlaan) portrays the first wife of Sir Arthur Chung. She dies in episode 39.
- Idy Chan portrays Aisin Gioro Yee-yin (愛新覺羅·爾嫣; Oisangoklo Jijin), a Manchu ex-princess of the fallen Qing dynasty; the second wife of Sir Arthur. She is the oldest daughter of Pak's character, and sister of Aisin Gioro Yee-hei; also the love interest of Chai Yat-fai. She leaves Sir Arthur Chung for Chai Yat-Fai in episode 36."
- Elena Kong portrays Yvonne Yik Yi-fong (易懿芳; Jik Jifong), the third wife of Sir Arthur. They later divorce after she has an affair with Muk Shui.
- Tavia Yeung portrays Hong Tsz-kwan (康子君; Hong Zigwan) a famous Peking opera daomadan singer known by the stage name Sai Fenghuang (賽鳳凰), who eventually becomes Sir Arthur's fourth wife, then divorces, and later remarries Sir Arthur as his only wife.
- Kenneth Ma portrays Charles Chung Kai-sun (鍾啟燊; Zung Kaisan), Chung's eldest son, also a barrister and husband to Kwai Siu-Yau.
- Rebecca Zhu portrays Kwai Siu-yau (季小由; Gwai Siujau), the wife of Kai-sun, a role that was originally meant for Fala Chen.
- Vincent Wong as Jimmy Chung Kai-yip (鍾啟燁; Zung Kaijip), Chung's illegitimate son.
- Sire Ma portrays Elaine Chung Ho-yi (鍾浩頤; Zung Houji), Chung's eldest daughter.
- Suki Lam portrays Chung Ho-ching (鍾浩晴; Zung Houcing), Chung's second daughter.
- Alvin Lau portrays Chung Kai-hei (鍾啟熙; Zung Kaihei), Chung's youngest son.

=== Fok family (霍家) ===
- Bill Chan portrays Philip Fok (霍百鏘), a rival barrister to Sir Arthur.
- Corinna Chamberlain portrays Sylvia, the wife of Philip.
- Stefan Wong portrays Lester Fok (霍力行), Philip's son who dies as a result of heartbroken due to rejection of his love by Elaine Chung.

=== Aisin Gioro family (愛新覺羅家) ===
- Yan Pak - Siu Wan-sin (肇蘊善), the mother of Aisin Gioro Yee-yin, and Aisin Gioro Yee-hei.
- Sammy Sum - Aisin Gioro Yee-hei (愛新覺羅·爾熹). He is the younger brother of Aisin Gioro Yee-yin.

=== Other characters ===
- Ron Ng portrays Kam Muk-Shui (金木水) Part of the adoptive family of Siu-Yau, and initially her love interest. He later has an affair with Sir Arthur's third wife, Yvonne.
- Ben Wong portrays Chai Yat-Fai (齊日輝), a businessman who is in love with Aisin Gioro Yee-Yin. His leg is amputated after being violently beaten up by Jimmy Chung in episode 25.
- Savio Tsang portrays Poon Hok-kei (潘學祈), Chung's assistant.
- Jess Sum portrays Suen Fei-Fei (孫菲菲) a Peking opera singer specializing in scholar-warrior characters (文武生). Also, a best friend to Hong Chi Kwan.
- Adrian Chau portrays Yung Dat Chi (容達志), a young cop who becomes Sir Arthur's son-in-law and husband to Chung Ho Yee.
- Bella Lam portrays Kwai Siu-Yu (季小茹), the younger sister of Siu-Yau.
- Charmaine Li portrays Choi Yuet (采月), a maid of Chung family who married Jimmy Chung.
- JJ Jia as Chiu Dan-dan (趙丹丹)

== Awards and nominations ==
2012 TVB Anniversary Awards

- Won: Best Actress (Tavia Yeung)
- Nominated: Best Drama
- Nominated: Best Actor, Top 5 (Damian Lau)
- Nominated: Best Supporting Actor (Vincent Wong)
- Nominated: Best Supporting Actress (Elena Kong)
- Nominated: My Favourite Male Character (Damian Lau)
- Nominated: My Favourite Female Character (Tavia Yeung)
- Nominated: Most Improved Male Artiste (Vincent Wong)

== Viewership ratings ==
The following is a table that includes a list of the total ratings points based on television viewership.

Week	Originally Aired	Episodes	Average Points	Peaking Points	References
1	22–26 October 2012	1 — 6	29	35	
2	29 October – 2 November 2012	7 — 11	29	31	
3	5–9 November 2012	12 — 15	29	—	
4	12–16 November 2012	16 — 20	28	—	
5	19–23 November 2012	21 — 25	28	—	
6	26–30 November 2012	26 — 30	29	32	
7	3–7 December 2012	31 — 35	30	35	
8	10–14 December 2012	36 — 40	31	37	
