= Eternal Happiness =

Hong Kong drama television series

- Promo poster
- 再生緣
- Genre: Costume drama
- Based on: Eternal Happiness by Chen Ruisheng
- Written by: Wong Kwok-fai; Tong Kin-ping
- Starring: Michelle Ye; Raymond Lam; Joe Ma; Tavia Yeung
- Theme music composer: Gary Chan; Lam Yuen Ming
- Opening theme: "Reincarnated Flower" (再生花) by Kelly Chen
- Ending theme: "Remember to Forget" (記得忘記) by Raymond Lam
- Country of origin: Hong Kong
- Original language: Cantonese
- No. of episodes: 32

Production
- Executive producer: Poon Ka-tak
- Production location: Hong Kong
- Camera setup: Multi camera
- Running time: 42 – 45 minutes
- Production company: TVB

Original release
- Network: TVB Jade
- Release: 5 August – 13 September 2002

Eternal Happiness
- Title screen shot
- Traditional Chinese: 再生緣
- Simplified Chinese: 再生缘
- Literal meaning: Eternal Happiness
Transcriptions
Standard Mandarin
- Hanyu Pinyin: Zài Shēng Yuán
Yue: Cantonese
- Jyutping: Zoi3 Sang1 Jyun4

Eternal Happiness (Traditional Chinese: 再生緣; literally Reincarnated Fate) is a 2002 TVB television drama from Hong Kong based on a short story of the same name by Qing dynasty novelist Chen Duansheng. Eternal Happiness was produced by Poon Kar Tak and edited by Tong King Ping. The original broadcast was on the TVB Jade network with 45-minute episodes airing five days a week from August 5 to September 13, 2002. Eternal Happiness was the highest rated drama in Hong Kong for the year 2002 eclipsing some other major productions such as Golden Faith and Where The Legend Begins.

== Cast and characters ==
Note: Some of the characters' names are in Cantonese romanisation.

- Michelle Ye as Mang Lai-kwan (孟麗君)
- Raymond Lam as Wongpo Siu-wah (皇甫少華)
- Joe Ma Tak-Chung as Temür Khan (奇渥溫鐵穆耳)
- Rain Lau as Wing-lan (榮蘭)
- Tavia Yeung as So Ying-suet (蘇映雪)
- Myolie Wu as Lau Yin-yuk (劉燕玉)
- Mok Ka Yiu as Mang Chi-yu (孟子儒)
- Ursule Wong as Wai Ying-ngor (衛勇娥)
- Lo Hoi Pang as Mang Si-yuen (孟士元)
- Deno Cheung as Lau Fui-bik (劉奎璧)
- Wi Kar Hung as Asong Gor (阿桑哥)
- Law Lok Lam as Lau Chit (劉捷)
- Natalie Wong as Princess Futjan (闊真郡主)
- Lee Kwok Luen as Man Kan-tung (文近東)
- Lee Kong Lung as Zhenjin (真金)
- Helena Law as Queen Nanbie (南必皇后)
- Kong Hon as Kublai Khan (忽必烈)
- Liu Kai Chi as Khungjil (忽哥赤)
- Chun Wong as Lai Yeuk-san (酈若山)
- Kenneth Ma as Lai Ming-tong (酈明堂)
- Mary Hon as Kakmaisi (格米思)
- Gregory Rivers as Marco Polo (馬可孛羅)

== Plot ==
Mang Lai-kwan's (Michelle Ye) father Mang Si-yuen (Lo Hoi Pang) was a royal doctor for the previous dynasty and a learned man, but he is set in his ways and believes that women should not be educated.

Lai-kwan wants to seek knowledge and often dresses as a man to go to school. On her ventures, she meets the royal grandson Temür (Joe Ma Tak-Chung) who is traveling in disguise and also a straight-up young hero Wongpo Siu-wah (Raymond Lam) and the three become adopted brothers.

Temür sees through Lai-kwan's disguise and knows she is a girl, but he does not reveal this; Lai-kwan also has feelings for Temür. Si-yuen decides to marry Lai-kwan to Wongpo Siu-wah, but at the same time, rich bully Lau Fui-bik (Deno Cheung) asks for Lai-kwan's hand in marriage. As the day of the marriage draws near, Lai-kwan decides to tell Temür about her feelings towards him, but Temür is summoned back to the courts and asks Siu-wah to take his place to meet her.

When Lai-kwan sees Siu-wah instead of Temür, she is very disappointed and pushes Siu-wah away. Lai-kwan runs away and on her travels, dressed as a man, causes many laughs and much trouble, getting involved in many different situations. Lai-kwan's feelings develop for both Temür and Siu-wah and are forever changing between the two, especially when she finds out that Siu-wah is actually her fiancé and Temür has become the emperor of the Yuan dynasty.
