= The Green Hope =

- Promo poster
- 新鮮人
- Genre: Drama; Romance
- Written by: Tsang Kan-cheong; Chu Keng-kei
- Directed by: Wong Siu-kit; Wong Wai-sam; Cheng Wing-kei
- Starring: Bowie Lam; Stephen Fung; Yoyo Mung; Joey Yung; Melissa Ng; Cathy Tsui
- Theme music composer: Stephen Fung
- Opening theme: The Green Hope (新鮮人) by Stephen Fung
- Ending theme: Fishing the Needle (撈針) by Joey Yung
- Composer: Eric Kwok
- Country of origin: Hong Kong
- Original language: Cantonese
- No. of episodes: 25

Production
- Producer: Tang kan-cheong
- Production location: Hong Kong
- Camera setup: Multi camera
- Running time: 45 minutes
- Production company: TVB

Original release
- Network: TVB Jade
- Release: 16 October – 17 November 2000

The Green Hope is a 2000 Hong Kong television drama produced by TVB, starring Bowie Lam and Melissa Ng. The 20-episode series also features a cast of young singers in their first TV roles, including Stephen Fung, Yoyo Mung, and Joey Yung.

== Synopsis ==
In a cold Christmas in 1996, the workaholic Fong Kin-choi (Lau Dan) has been sick in bed. His dying wish is to find his youngest son Ka-him (Stephen Fung), who lived with his mother due to the divorce 12 years ago. After 12 years, Kin-choi's oldest son, Ka-fai (Bowie Lam), found out that his younger brother has mental illness due to their mother, Wong Yuen-fan (Mary Hon) being drug abuser and forcing Ka-him to do illegal things since young age.

After his father died, Ka-fai took Ka-him in and helped him get back on his track as living as a normal person. Ka-fai notices his brother is a gifted musician, but his talent is hidden for years. With the help of Ka-fai, Ka-him's talent shows off and becomes a famous pianist, recognized by other people. It proves that although he's a minor mentally ill patient, he can still live a normal life and being successful just like others.

Throughout the show, Ka-him's struggle to success was littered with failures and discrimination by others due to his disability. Towards the end of the show, Ka-him's effort was eventually recognised. The show carries an inspiring underlying message that people with disabilities can succeed, and disability discrimination only contributes negatively to their struggle.

== Cast ==
- Bowie Lam as Fong Ka-fai (方家輝), an interior designer.
- Stephen Fung as Fong Ka-him (方家謙), Ka-fai's younger brother who has mental illness, but is a gifted musician.
- Yoyo Mung as Siu Lai-wah (邵麗華), Ka-fai's girlfriend.
- Joey Yung as Wai Man (韋文), Ka-him's girlfriend.
- Melissa Ng as Shum Kai-kwan (冼佳君), Ka-fai's ex-wife.
- Cathy Tsui as Yuen Ying (阮盈), a girl who admires Ka-him, but has obsessive–compulsive disorder and autism.
- Vincent Kok as Pau Chi-chung (鮑子聰), Ka-him's friend who is an employee at a sheltered workshop.
- Tavia Yeung as Vivian Fung (馮慧慧), Man's friend.
- Lau Dan as Fong Kin-choi (方建材), Ka-fai and Ka-him's father.
- Mary Hon as Wong Yuen-fan (王婉芬), Ka-fai and Ka-him's mother.
- Helen Ma as Shum Pang Miu-chun (冼彭妙珍), Kai-kwan's mother.
- Li Shing-cheong as Wai Kuen (韋權), Man's older brother who is a traffic cop.
- Liu Kai-chi as Law Lok-tin (羅天樂), Ka-him's friend who is an instructor at a sheltered workshop.
- Lau Kong as Yeung Ting-chung (楊定忠)
- Cheuk Wan-chi as Tang Ho-ho (鄧浩浩), Ka-him's friend who is an employee at a sheltered workshop.
- Kwan Hoi-san as Yu Chin-sau (于漸秀), a deaf pianist who becomes Ka-him's mentor.
- Tin Kai-man as Frog (田雞), an employee at a sheltered workshop.
- Eddy Ko as Tung Yuen-chi (董志遠), Ho-ho's stepfather.
- Kenny Wong as Cheung Kai-keung (張介強), Kuen's friend who betrays him later on.
