= Land of Wealth =

- 匯通天下
- Genre: Costume Drama
- Starring: Moses Chan; Steven Ma; Sonija Kwok; Tavia Yeung
- Opening theme: "滙通天下" by Eason Chan
- Ending theme: "川流不息" by Moses Chan
- Country of origin: Hong Kong
- Original language: Cantonese
- No. of episodes: 32

Production
- Running time: 45 minutes (approx.)

Original release
- Network: TVB
- Release: September 11 – October 21, 2006

Land of Wealth (Traditional Chinese: 匯通天下) is a TVB costume drama series broadcast in September 2006.

== Synopsis ==
During the Qing dynasty in Beijing, a powerful empress took over the throne. The story focus on four different families. The Chai family, Chai Hok-Yan (Chung King Fai), who was betrayed by other officials and the whole family was sentenced to death. Chai Pak-Chuen (Moses Chan) was the only survivor in the Chai family because a loyal assistant of his switched identities with him. Pak-Cheun changed his name to Fan Chi-Chai and traveled to a different city to start a new life. That's when he met the Kiu family. Kiu Bun-Yip (David Chiang), is a successful business banker, however, he also has enemies, including the Cho family. Bun-Yip invited Pak-Chuen to his bank Ding Fung Shing to learn about banking. At the same time, he met Cheung Shung-Man (Steven Ma), the two of them became best friends.

Pak-Chuen met Ba Ba Ha Yee Ko-Wa (Sonija Kwok), the two of fell in love, but because of a little misunderstanding due to Pak-Chuen refusing to marry Ko-Wa and suggested that their marriage will only burden his career. Ko-Wa married to Bun-Yip instead to make Pak-Chuen jealous. Shung-Man and Bun-Yip's daughter, Kiu Choi (Tavia Yeung) were also in loved, however Shung-Man's family disapprove the marriage. Choi married Pak-Chuen instead because Bun Yip passed the position of Head Master of Ding Fung Shing to Pak-Chuen. His eldest son-in-law, Fong Yun-Tin (Kenny Wong), who is in the position as Second Master of Ding Fung Sing object the idea by saying that the position as Head Master cannot be pass to outsider.

Later on, Pak-Chuen became more and more successful in the business of banking, Bun-Yip asked Pak-Chuen to lead the banking business. At the same time, Pak-Chuen is also seeking revenge for his family, and trying to find who was behind the whole scheme. As the story goes on, the family goes through many hardships and obstacles in life. It's about betrayal, and corruption in business and in the government around a world of good, innocent people. The story also revolves around China's first banks and problems that they had to face.

== Cast ==
Cast	Role	Description
Moses Chan	Chai Pak-Chuen/Fan Chi-Chai 齊百川/范子齊	Ding Fung Shing Head Master; Cheung Shung-Man's friend. Kiu Chun's husband.
Steven Ma	Cheung Shung-Man 章崇文	Government Official; Chai Pak-Chuen's friend.
Sonija Kwok	Ba Ba Ha Yee Ko-Wa 巴巴哈兒高娃	Servant; Fu Yee-Chek's older sister. Kiu Bun-Yip's household servant.
David Chiang	Kiu Bun-Yip 喬本業	Ding Fung Shing Bank Owner; Kiu Chun and Kiu Ching's father.
Tavia Yeung	Kiu Chun 喬蓁	Kiu Bun-Yip and Mang Yuet Ngo's daughter. Chai Pak-Chuen's wife. Died on Episode 32
Chung King Fai	Chai Hok-Yan 齊學仁	Government Official; Chai Pak-Chuen's father.
Lui Shan (呂珊)	Mang Yuet-Ngoh 孟月娥	Kiu Bun-Yip's wife. Kiu Chun and Kiu Ching's mother. Mang Yuet-Seung's younger sister.
Claire Yiu	Kiu Ching 喬菁	Fong Yun-Tin's wife. Kiu Chun's older sister. Kiu Bun-Yip and Mang Yuet Ngo's daughter.
Kenny Wong (黃德斌)	Fong Yun-Tin 方潤田	Ding Fung Shing Second Master; Kiu Ching's husband.
Lau Dan	Cho Yue-Tai 曹裕泰	Kiu Bun-Yip's rival.
Rebecca Chan	Mang Yuet-Seung 孟月嫦	Cho Yue-Tai's wife. Mang Yuet-Ngoh's older sister.
Lai Lok-yi	Cho King-Yin 曹景賢	Kiu Bun-Yip's nephew and Cho Yue-Tai's son.
Stephen Wong	Fu Yee-Chek 虎兒赤	Banking Student; Ba Ba Ha Yee Ko Wa's younger brother.

== Viewership ratings ==
	Week	Episode	Average Points	Peaking Points	References
1	September 11–15, 2006	1 — 5	29	30	
2	September 18–22, 2006	6 — 10	27	29	
3	September 25–29, 2006	11 — 15	26	—	
4	October 2–6, 2006	16 — 20	26	—	
5	October 9–13, 2006	21 — 25	26	—	
6	October 16–20, 2006	26 — 30	28	—	
7	October 21, 2006	31 — 32	29	32	
