= The Root of All Evil (D&D Adventure) =

Tabletop role-playing game adventure

The Root of All Evil is an adventure module for the Dungeons & Dragons role-playing game. It was created for the Kingdoms of Kalamar campaign setting and published by Kenzer & Company. It is made for 1st-level players in a 64-page book written by Andy Miller. Its item code is K&C1100, and it was first published in 2001. It is the first adventure in the Coin of Power trilogy, the other two being Forging Darkness and Coin's End.

== Reviews ==
- Backstab #32
- Pyramid

== Additional reading ==
- The Unseen Servant - The Root of all Evil
