= The Heaven Sword and Dragon Saber (2000 TV series) =

2000 Hong Kong TV series

- TVB poster
- Also known as: The Heaven Sword & the Dragon Sabre 2000
- 倚天屠龍記
- Genre: Wuxia
- Based on: The Heaven Sword and Dragon Saber by Jin Yong
- Screenplay by: Leung Wing-mui; Lam Siu-chi; Yip Sai-hong; Wong Kwok-fai; Tam Tsui-san; Lau Choi-wan
- Directed by: Luk Tin-wah; Chan Seung-kuen; Ng Chan-chau; Wong Kwok-keung; Yung Man-wing; Chan Chi-kong
- Starring: Lawrence Ng; Gigi Lai; Charmaine Sheh; Damian Lau; Michelle Yim
- Opening theme: "Winds Rise, Clouds Roll" (風起雲湧) by Lawrence Ng
- Country of origin: Hong Kong
- Original language: Cantonese
- No. of episodes: 42

Production
- Executive producer: Chong Wai-kin
- Production location: Hong Kong
- Running time: ≈45 minutes per episode
- Production company: TVB

Original release
- Network: TVB Jade
- Release: 9 April – 26 May 2001

Related
- The Condor Heroes 95 (1995)

The Heavenly Sword and Dragon Saber (倚天屠龍記) is a Hong Kong wuxia television series adapted from the novel of the same title by Jin Yong. The series was first released overseas in 2000 before it was broadcast on TVB Jade in Hong Kong in 2001. It has the record for most TVB Best Actress winners, including Charmaine Sheh (2006/2014), Gigi Lai (2004), Michelle Yim (2008), Tavia Yeung (2012), and Kara Wai (2018).

== Cast ==
- Lawrence Ng as Zhang Wuji
  - John Tang as Zhang Wuji (child)
- Gigi Lai as Zhao Min
- Charmaine Sheh as Zhou Zhiruo
- Damian Lau as Zhang Cuishan
- Michelle Yim as Yin Susu
- Felix Lok as Xie Xun
- Tsang Wai-wun as Xie Xun's wife
- Chow Chung as Zhang Sanfeng
- Joyce Tang as Yang Buhui / Ji Xiaofu
- Gordon Liu as Cheng Kun
- Liz Kong as Xiaozhao
- Cherie Chan as Yin Li
- Eddie Cheung as Yang Xiao
- Wong Wai-tak as Fan Yao
- Ku Feng as Yin Tianzheng
- Wilson Tsui as Yin Yewang
- Alice Fung as Daiqisi
  - Elvina Kong as Daiqisi (younger)
- Kara Hui as Miejue
- Lee Lung-kei as Song Yuanqiao
- Raymond Cho as Song Qingshu
- Leung Kin-ping as Yu Lianzhou
- Lee Kwok-lun as Yu Daiyan
- Lee Kong-lung as Zhang Songxi
- Edward Mok as Yin Liting
- Ken Lok as Mo Shenggu
- Jason Lam as Mingyue
- Lin Wai-hung as Qingfeng
- Wong Ching as Wei Yixiao
- Wong Chun-tong as Zhou Dian
- Johnson Law as Shuobude
- Doi Siu-man as Leng Qian
- Tse Ka-hei as Peng Yingyu
- Lo Mang as Chang Yuchun
- Leung Fai-tsung as Xu Da
- Yeung Ching-wah as Han Lin'er
- Anderson Junior as Hu Qingniu
- Yau Man-sing as Zhu Yuanzhang
- Wong Man-biu as Yang Dingtian
- Chow Hoi-san as Yang Dingtian's wife
- Ching Siu-lung as Chang Jinpeng
- Mak Tze-wun as Bai Guishou
- Tsang Kin-ming as Wufu
- Lee Tze-kei as Wulu
- Fong Kit as Wushou
- Kwan Ching as Lu Zhangke
- Tse Bo-law as He Biweng
- Akina Hong as Ding Minjun
- Safina Lam as Bei Jinyi
- Catherine Chau as Xuanmiao
- Candy Chiu as Xuanjing
- Tavia Yeung, Yeung Hoi-tzi and Yeung Mun-tzi as Emei Sect members
- Steve Lee as He Taichong
- So Yan-chi as Ban Shuxian
- Chiu Wing-hung and Tai Yiu-ming as Kunlun Sect members
- Kwok Tak-shun as Xianyu Tong
- Lee Hoi-sang as Tang Wenliang
- Wah Chung-nam as Zhu Changling
- Liu Lai-lai as Hongying
- Sherming Yiu as Zhu Jiuzhen
- Koon Chung-ming as Wei Bi
- Lau Dan as Chaghan Temur
- Gabriel Harrison as Wang Baobao
- Lee Yin-san as Lady Han
- Zuki Lee as Guo Xiang
- Wong Wai-leung as Guo Polu
- June Chan as the Yellow Dress Maiden
- Timothy Zau as Boluoalu
- Lily Leung as Boluoalu's mother
- Lau Kar-lung as Ada
- Tong Chun-ming as Aer
- Sammul Chan as Asan
- Kong Hon as Du'e
- Ling Lai-mun as Dujie
- Tsang Shau-ming as Dunan
- Yu Tze-ming as Kongjian
- Tam Yat-ching as Kongwen
- Lee Hung-kit as Kongzhi
- Ling Hon as Kongxing
- Kiu Hung as Kongxiang
- Wong Tin-chak as Yuanyin
- Cheung Hung-cheung as Yuanye
- Chan Wing-chun as Chen Youliang
- Chan Sui-wah as Shi Hongshi
- Chun Wong as Shi Huolong
- Wong Fung-ging as Caifeng
- Yu Tin-wai and Suen Kwai-hing as Beggar Clan elders
- Kan Mok as Han Qianye
- Choi Kwok-hing as Du Dajin
- Gregory Charles Rivers, Joe Junior and Au-yeung Kwok-cheung as the Persian guardian kings
- Ho Wai-yip, Ng Yi-hin and Yiu Kai-sin as the Persian messengers

== Soundtrack ==
The Heaven Sword and Dragon Saber (OST)

Soundtrack album by Various artists
- Released: 2001-04-24
- Genre: Soundtrack
- Label: Pony Canyon (HK)

=== Track list ===
1. "Winds Rise, Clouds Roll" (風起雲湧) by Lawrence Ng
2. "Gentle and Fragrant I" (溫馨)
3. "Bleak" (蒼涼)
4. "Relaxed" (輕鬆)
5. "Transient Life is Like a Dream" (浮生若夢) by Liz Kong
6. "Infatuated Love" (情迷)
7. "Love I" (愛情)
8. "Love II" (愛情)
9. "Brilliant Holy Flame" (熊熊聖火)
10. "Success" (功成)
11. "Gentle and Fragrant II" (溫馨)
12. "Love III" (愛情)
13. "Sorrowful" (感傷)
14. "Nervous" (緊張)
15. "Suspense" (懸疑)
16. "Training" (練功)
17. "Anxiety" (愁)
18. "Sadness" (哀)
19. "Love Next Time" (下次再戀愛) by Lawrence Ng (bonus track)
