= Route of All Evil =

Route of All Evil may refer to:

- "The Route of All Evil", 2002 Futurama episode
- Route of All Evil Tour, 2005-6 concert tour co-headlined by American hard rock band Aerosmith and heavy metal/glam metal band Mötley Crüe
- "The Route of All Evil", 1995 Home Improvement episode
- "Money: The Route Of All Evil", slogan for the 1981 arcade game Route-16

== See also ==
- Root of all evil (disambiguation)
