= Eye in the Sky (TV series) =

2015 Hong Kong television series

- Official poster
- Also known as: Heaven's Eye; The Third Eye (제 3의 눈)
- 天眼
- Genre: Crime thriller, action, drama
- Created by: Hong Kong Television Broadcasts Limited
- Written by: Lau Chi-wah
- Starring: Kevin Cheng; Ruco Chan; Tavia Yeung; Rosina Lam; Tony Hung; Samantha Ko; Barry Cox
- Theme music composer: Alan Cheung
- Opening theme: "Truth" (真相) by Alfred Hui and Hubert Wu
- Country of origin: Hong Kong
- Original language: Cantonese
- No. of episodes: 20

Production
- Executive producer: Catherine Tsang
- Producer: Dave Fong
- Production location: Hong Kong
- Editor: Lau Chi-wah
- Camera setup: Multi camera
- Running time: 45 minutes (per episode)
- Production company: TVB

Original release
- Network: TVB Jade, HD Jade
- Release: 2 March – 27 March 2015

Eye in the Sky
- Chinese: 天眼
- Literal meaning: "Sky's Eye"
Transcriptions
Standard Mandarin
- Hanyu Pinyin: Tiānyǎn
Yue: Cantonese
- Yale Romanization: Tīn Ngáahn
- Jyutping: Tin1 Ngaan5

Eye in the Sky (Chinese: 天眼; Jyutping: Tin1 Ngaan5; Cantonese Yale: Tīn Ngáahn; literally "Heaven's Eye" or "Sky's Eye") is a 2015 Hong Kong crime thriller television drama created and produced by TVB. The drama focuses on the relationship between two brothers, portrayed by Kevin Cheng and Ruco Chan, and deals with themes of comeuppance and destiny. In the series, the two brothers often use video surveillance cameras to catch criminals; these cameras are also commonly referred to as "heaven's eye" in Cantonese speech.

Eye in the Sky aired from 2 to 27 March 2015 on Hong Kong's Jade and HD Jade channels, totalling 20 episodes.

== Plot ==
CID investigator Szeto Shun (Kevin Cheng) becomes the prime suspect of an arson case when surveillance cameras capture a culprit who looks identical to him. Thanks to an alibi, Szeto finally gets eliminated as a suspect, but his colleagues remain skeptical. To prove his innocence, Szeto resigns from his position in the police force and takes up a job as Head of Security at the swanky Y Suite Hotel. He decides to solve the arson mystery on his own, but not without the help of his former colleague, CID detective Scarlett Wong (Lin Xiawei), who seems to be the only one who believed his innocence.

Small time private investigator Jan Ng (Tavia Yeung) falls in love with Szeto at first sight after seeing him take down a gun-crazed criminal. When a client who looks identical to Szeto shows up at her father's investigation firm later that day, she automatically assumes him to be Szeto without asking his name. Since the client does not want to divulge his true identity, he goes along with Jan thinking he is Szeto. The man hires her to trail a person that leads her entangled with the triads, but saves her in time and the two have a one-night stand. Eighteen months later, Jan runs into the real Szeto and assumes him to be the same person she had spent the night with, but while investigating another client's case at the Y Suite Hotel, she finds out that Szeto and her client are not the same. Thinking that Jan's client may be the true culprit in the arson case, Szeto tells Jan to find the man, and the two form a mentor-protege relationship.

During this time, Szeto befriends security guard Cheng Nik-hang (Ruco Chan), a seasoned thief in disguise, who infiltrates the Y Suite Hotel to find a stolen treasure. While helping Szeto investigate his arson case, Szeto discovers Nik-hang's own tragic past, including being a twin brother who had his face burned during a burglary and reconstructed to look different 18 months later.

== Cast ==
=== Main characters ===
- Kevin Cheng as Szeto Shun (司徒舜; Sitou Seon)

Known as Szeto Sir, a former CID inspector who was forced to resign from the police force after becoming a suspect in an arson case. After leaving the force, he is hired by Kong Wui-hoi to be the security manager of his luxury Y Suite Hotel.

- Ruco Chan as Cheng Nik-hang (鄭力行; Zeng Likhang)

Known as Ah Lik, a seasoned criminal whose mysterious past is linked to Szeto Shun.

- Tavia Yeung as Jan Ng Chun-ni (吳珍妮; Ng Zannei)

A private investigator with eidetic memory.

=== Agatha investigation ===
- Samantha Ko as Agatha "Ah Fa" Lam (藍菱; Laam Ling)

Jan's wealthy friend and a private investigator who formerly worked for Jan's father. Unsatisfied with how her boss treats his employees she later opens her own investigation firm and has Jan work for her.

- Even Chan as Didi
- Tsz Mei Chu as Chiu Ying-wan (趙英雲; Ziu Jingwan)
- Shally Tsang as Dai Ciu (戴超; Doi Chiu)

=== Tai family ===
- Tony Hung as Tai Fu-lung (戴富龍; Doi Fulung)

Nik-hang's accomplice and childhood friend. He also goes by the name "Terry".

- Suet Nei as Grandma Mui (梅婆; Mui Po)

Tai Fu-lung's loving grandmother. She takes Cheng Nik-hang into her home after seeing him begging in the streets. She is aware of Cheng Nik-hang's real identity and tries to hide it.

=== Szeto family ===
- Law Lok-lam as Szeto Kwok-keung (司徒國強)

Szeto Shun's father. He is a driving instructor.

- Angelina Lo as Leung Mei-dak (梁美德)

Szeto Shun's mother. She is a television cooking show host.

=== Ng Chor-chi Private Investigators ===
- Henry Yu as Ng Chor-chi (吳佐治)

Jan's father and owner of the private detective firm named after himself. He treats his workers selfishly. When Agatha opens her own private investigation firm he loses significant business and has to resort to changing partial of his office to an internet cafe.

- Tyson Chak as Ngai Fu-gwai (倪富貴)

Ng Chor-chi's personal assistant.

=== Hong Kong Police - Crime Unit ===
- Becky Lee as Superintendent Anson Chik (戚令儀; Cik Lingji)

Szeto's former superior.

- Rosina Lam as Scarlett Wong (黃雅晴; Wong Ngaacing)

A CID detective and Szeto's loyal assistant who helps him find the true perpetrator in the arson case.

- Hero Yuen as Wheel Lee (李兆倫; Lee Siulin)
- Lam King Kong as Tse Ting-long (謝正朗)
- Man Yeung as Kwok Wing-yin (郭永賢)
- Chan Wing-chun as Ching Gwok-chung (程國忠)

=== Y Suite Hotel staff ===
- Lau Kong as Kong Wui-hoi (江匯海; Kong Wuihoi)

The blind CEO of Yat Ming Hin Hotel Corp. He has connections with the underworld.

- Willie Wai as Charles Kong (江明威; Kong Mingwai)

Szeto's superior and Kong Wui-hoi's nephew. He uses nepotism to wield his power in the hotel and hates Szeto Shun for not follow through his orders that is not work related.

- Raymond Tsang as Chun (泉; Cyun)

Kong Wui-hoi's personal assistant and chauffeur. He is Wui-hoi's only employee that is aware of his criminal past.

- Derek Wong as Manager

The manager in charge of the Hotel cafe.

- Jonathan Cheung as Fate Fan (范飛; Faan Fei)

A security guard at Y Suite Hotel. He is an opportunist who likes to suck up to Charles Kong.

- Barry Cox as Hung Chun-ying (洪俊英)

A security guard at the hotel.

- Calvin Wai as Chan Wing-ho (陳永豪)

A security guard at the hotel.

- Moses Cheng as Chung Yiu (鍾耀)

A security guard at the hotel.

- Tony Yee as Chan Bal (陳波)

A security guard at the hotel. He is later fired when he tries to get Kwok Hoi-yiu evicted from the hotel.

- Kelvin Chan as Chu Chi-gin (朱志堅)

A security guard at the hotel hired by Kong Wui-hoi to kill Kwok Hoi-yiu.

- Celine Ma as Chu Lau-si (朱露絲)

The housekeeping manager at Y Suite Hotel. She and Charles Kong are the only two employees that has access to Kong Wui-hoi's private suite in the hotel.

- Janice Shum as Ng Sau-mei (伍秀媚)

A housekeeper at the hotel.

- Judy Tsang as Choi Wai-gwan (蔡慧君)

A housekeeper at the hotel.

- GoGo Cheung as Ding Siu-kau (丁小喬)

A housekeeper at the hotel.

- Fanny Ip as Carly Chan (沈佳莉; Chan Gailei)

The lobby manager at Y Suite Hotel.

- Mikako Leung as Jenny

A receptionist at the hotel lobby.

- Ip Ting-chi as Wing

A receptionist at the hotel lobby.

=== Y Suite Hotel guests ===
- Susan Tse as Kwok Hoi-yiu (郭凱瑤; Gwok Hoijiu)

A has-been romantic novelist and resident at the Hotel who lives with her pet dog "Capital". She is snobbish and treats all the employees at the hotel poorly.

- Vivien Yeo as Hon San (韓晨)

A mysterious woman with a shady profile.

- Mandy Lam as Mrs. Chin (錢太; Cin Taai)

A wealthy socialite who invites cooks to her suite weekly to cook her a meal.

- Ngai Wai-man as Mr. Chin (錢生; Cin Saang)

A wealthy businessman who thinks his wife is cheating on him.

- Leo Tsang as Mr. Ma (馬生; Ma Saang)

A hotel guest raising and trying to sell an endangered Chinese giant salamander on the black market.

=== Others ===
- King Kong as Chiu Kwok-hung (趙國熊)

A Taiwanese triad boss who Cheng Nik-hang hires Jan to trail. He holds Tai Fu-lung captive because he had a fling with his women.

- Jade Leung as Chow Cheng-man (周靜雯)

A former celebrity and Szeto Shun's high school classmate whom he has feelings for.

- Helena Law as Ho Ye-gu (何二姑)

The nurse who stole and sold Cheng Nik-hang during his birth.

- Gloria Chan as Yuen Ka-wai (阮嘉慧)

A delinquent girl kidnapped by a psychotic killer.

- Kiko Leung as Chung Sao-kei (鍾秀琪)

A delinquent girl who becomes the psychotic killer's latest victim.

- Ceci So as Lee Lei-han (李麗嫻)

A mother unable to accept the death of her unruly daughter, she kidnaps delinquent girls as a way to reform them.

- Brian Burrell as Mr.Pittman

A crime lord Cheng Nik-hang and Tai Fu-lung double crossed in the Philippines.

- Choi Kwok-Hing as Wu Gum-yu (胡金耀; Wu Gamjiu)

Kong Wui-hoi's former criminal accomplice who has also become a wealthy man.

- Babe Tree as Lia

An Indonesian business women who schemes with her boyfriend Ngai Fu-gwai to swindle Ng Chor-chi out of his home and business.

== Development ==
TVB 2015 calendar, month of July image. From left to right: Ruco Chan, Tavia Yeung, Kevin Cheng.

- Development for Eye in the Sky began in late 2013.
- A teaser trailer starring Chan was unveiled at TVB's 2014 Sales Presentation event, which was held in November 2013.
- A promo image of Eye in the Sky was featured in TVB's 2015 calendar for the month of July.
- The costume fitting ceremony was held on May 7, 2014, 12:30 pm at Tseung Kwan O TVB City Studio One.
- Former TVB actor Michael Tong was originally cast in the role Cheng Lik Hung, but due to a schedule conflict, Ruco Chan replaced him.
- Veteran Hong Kong actor David Lo (盧大偉) was originally cast as Ng Chor-chi (吳佐治), but had to withdraw during mid-production and Henry Yu (于洋) replaced him .
- Filming of the drama began in May 2014 and ended in August 2014.

== Reception ==
=== Ratings ===
The following is a table that includes a list of the total ratings points based on television viewership. "Viewers in millions" refers to the number of people, derived from TVB Jade ratings (including TVB HD Jade), in Hong Kong who watched the episode live. The peak number of viewers are in brackets.

#	Timeslot (HKT)	Week	Episode(s)	Average points	Peaking points	Viewers	Ref.
1	Mon – Fri, 21:30	2 – 6 March 2015	1 — 5	25	—	1.61 million	
2	Mon – Fri, 21:30	9 – 13 March 2015	6 — 10	25	27	1.61 million	
3	Mon – Fri, 21:30	16 – 20 March 2015	11 — 15	25	—	1.61 million	
4	Mon – Fri, 21:30	23 – 27 March 2015	16 — 20	25	27	1.61 million	

== Awards and nominations ==
Year	Ceremony	Category	Nominee	Result
2015	StarHub TVB Awards	My Favourite TVB Drama	Eye in the Sky	Nominated
2015	StarHub TVB Awards	My Favourite TVB Actor	Kevin Cheng	Nominated
2015	StarHub TVB Awards	My Favourite TVB Actress	Tavia Yeung	Nominated
2015	StarHub TVB Awards	My Favourite TVB Supporting Actor	Tony Hung	Nominated
2015	StarHub TVB Awards	My Favourite TVB Supporting Actress	Samantha Ko	Nominated
2015	StarHub TVB Awards	My Favourite TVB Male TV Character	Kevin Cheng	Nominated
2015	StarHub TVB Awards	My Favourite TVB Female TV Character	Tavia Yeung	Won
2015	StarHub TVB Awards	My Favourite TVB Theme Song	"Truth" (真相) by Alfred Hui & Hubert Wu	Won
2015	TVB Star Awards Malaysia	My Favourite TVB Drama Series	Eye in the Sky	Nominated
2015	TVB Star Awards Malaysia	My Favourite TVB Actor in a Leading Role	Kevin Cheng	Nominated
2015	TVB Star Awards Malaysia	My Favourite TVB Actor in a Supporting Role	Tony Hung	Nominated
2015	TVB Star Awards Malaysia	My Favourite TVB Actress in a Supporting Role	Samantha Ko	Nominated
2015	TVB Star Awards Malaysia	My Favourite TVB On-Screen Couple	Kevin Cheng & Tavia Yeung	Nominated
2015	TVB Star Awards Malaysia	My Favourite TVB Drama Theme Song	"Truth" (真相) by Alfred Hui & Hubert Wu	Nominated
2015	TVB Anniversary Awards	TVB Anniversary Award for Best Drama	Eye in the Sky	Nominated
2015	TVB Anniversary Awards	TVB Anniversary Award for Best Actor	Kevin Cheng	Nominated
2015	TVB Anniversary Awards	TVB Anniversary Award for Best Supporting Actress	Samantha Ko	Nominated
2015	TVB Anniversary Awards	TVB Anniversary Award for Most Popular Male Character	Kevin Cheng	Nominated
2015	TVB Anniversary Awards	TVB Anniversary Award for Favourite Drama Song	"Truth" (真相) by Alfred Hui & Hubert Wu	Nominated

== International Broadcast ==
- Malaysia - 8TV (Malaysia)
