= The Hippocratic Crush =

Hong Kong television series

- Promo poster
- Also known as: On Call 36 Hours
- On Call 36小時
- Genre: Medical drama
- Created by: Hong Kong Television Broadcasts Limited
- Written by: Suen Ho-ho; Poon Man-hung; Leung Yan-tung
- Starring: Kenneth Ma; Tavia Yeung; Him Law; Mandy Wong; Benjamin Yuen; Candy Chang; Ben Wong; Gigi Wong
- Theme music composer: Tang Chi-wai
- Opening theme: 連續劇 by Joey Yung
- Country of origin: Hong Kong
- Original languages: Cantonese; Mandarin; English
- No. of episodes: 25

Production
- Executive producer: Tommy Leung
- Producer: Poon Ka-tak
- Production location: Hong Kong
- Camera setup: Multi camera
- Running time: 45 minutes (each)
- Production company: TVB

Original release
- Network: Jade; HD Jade
- Release: 13 February – 16 March 2012

Related
- The Hippocratic Crush II

The Hippocratic Crush
- intertitle
- Chinese: On Call 36小時
- Literal meaning: "on call 36 hours"
Transcriptions
Standard Mandarin
- Hanyu Pinyin: On Call Sānshíliù Xiǎoshí
Yue: Cantonese
- Jyutping: On Call Saam1 Sap6 Luk6 Siu2 Si4

The Hippocratic Crush, also known by its Chinese language title On Call 36 Hours (Chinese: On Call 36小時) is a 2012 Hong Kong television medical drama series produced by Poon Ka-tak and TVB. The drama follows the lives of young housemen, residents, and their mentors working in Mercy Hospital (慈愛醫院), a fictional hospital set in Hong Kong.

A sequel series with 30 episodes, The Hippocratic Crush II (a.k.a. On Call 36 Hours II), began filming in February 2013. The sequel premiered on 4 November 2013.

== Plot ==
The drama revolves around a group of housemen joining in as doctors in training in Mercy Hospital and their trainers. Throughout the drama, many events unfurl challenging the housemen and their mentors: romance, tragedy, family events and memories and much more happen throughout the drama.

Cheung Yat Kin (Kenneth Ma) recently graduated and started his practice in neurosurgery at Mercy Hospital (慈愛醫院). Kin is a determined doctor who took his work seriously and strictly followed the rules. Although his medical interns were afraid of his strict rules and high expectations, they respected his exceptional skills and experiences. Kin initially studied medicine because he was grateful to the doctor Fan Chi Ngok (Yu's father) who saved his younger brother, Cheung Yat Hong (Nathan Ngai) after a horrible traffic accident. Kin took great care of his brother and worked hard to earn enough money to send his brother to study overseas. Worried that his brother will be unable to take care of himself as his legs were paralyzed, Kin decided that his mother shall accompany his brother overseas. Thus Kin had to work doubly hard to earn enough money to support both of them. Kin's incredible work ethic enabled him to work hard and save enough money to support his brother financially. For that reason, Kin did not consider being committed into a relationship until he met Fan Chi Yu (Tavia Yeung). Yu, a reputable doctor, worked on several projects with Kin and found herself falling in love with him. However, when she found out that her long lost sister, Hung Mei Suet (Mandy Wong), also liked Kin, she decided to give up on pursuing him. Subsequently, Kin realized that he also had feelings for Yu when she stopped talking to him and confessed his love to her. Shortly after Kin and Yu started their relationship, Hong got into an accident and tragically died. Kin's grief over his younger brother's tragic death greatly influenced his attitude towards his interns, especially Yeung Pui Chung (Him Law), whom Kin had always considered as a younger brother. To make matters worse, Kin suddenly finds out that Yu suffers from tumor in her spine which may become life-threatening. Yu actively searched for treatment and her persistent spirit motivated

Kin to get back on his feet to support her. Unfortunately, Yu's condition worsened, and she took the risk of undergoing a risky surgery. As a doctor and Yu's boyfriend, Kin and Yu's father took on the challenge to do the surgery on her. After enduring the hardships together, Kin and Yu's feelings grew deeper and toy married.

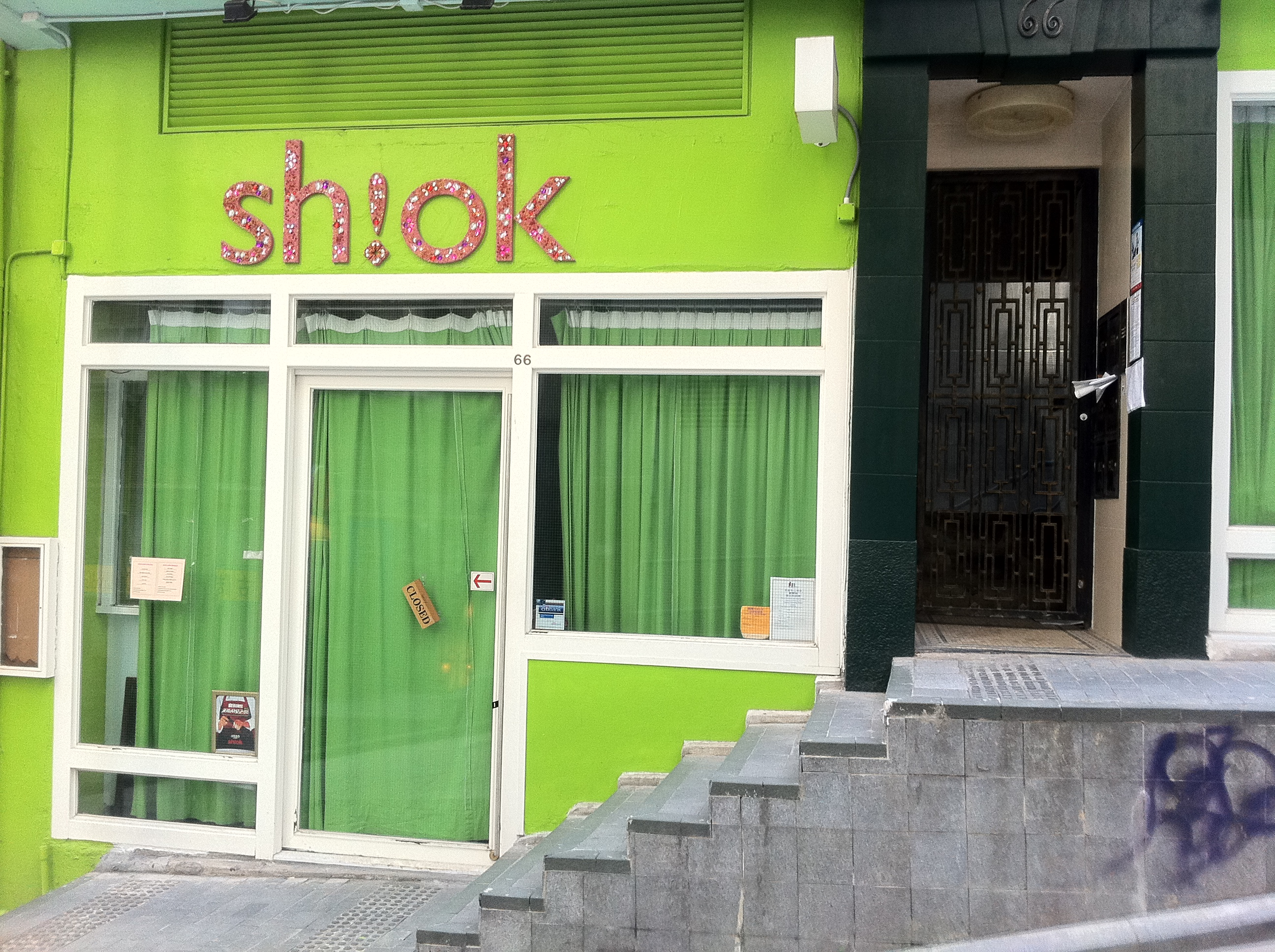
residence of Dr. Cheung (Kin), Onion, and some staff at 66, Sh!ok later closed and black cladding added over the green wall)

=== Episode plots ===
Episode #	Original Air Date (Hong Kong)	Summary
1	2012	Dr. Fan (Yu) leaves home for her first day of the work year and is delayed by a pedestrian injury on the street. Dr. Y.K. Cheung helped the little boy, To Tze Lam. The boy is later admitted for observation and discharged, despite Dr. Y.K. Cheung being opposed to it after he learned the boy had left the hospital. The boy later returns to the hospital with bleeding in the brain needing surgery, something that Dr. Y.K. Cheung was concerned about in the first place. Pui Chung (Onion) and Mei Suet are interns on Dr. Y.K. Cheung's neurosurgery service. Onion is inept, unable to draw blood or place an IV, unlike Mei Suet, and drops/mis-files x-rays and x-ray reports. Dr. Fan (Yu) performs a test for Dr. Y.K. Cheung by fishing out a raisin from rice pudding but disrupts the pudding, which is considered a failure.
2	2012	Nurse Kei Kei is introduced when she gives Dr. Fan (Yu) some hand lotion. Male nurse Yik is scolded by Matron (head nurse) Wong Siu Lik. Onion continues poor performance by doing an incomplete history and physical on a patient. Male nurse Yik brings his son to the hospital because he doesn't have child care. He is the neighbor of Dr. Y.K. Cheung's family apartment. A big surgery for an AVM is assigned to Dr. Y.K. Cheung, instead of his higher trainee colleague, Philip. Other trainees and interns (housemen) find out that Dr. Fan (Yu) is the daughter of respected neurosurgeon and former hospital head of neurosurgery Dr. Fan. Some of them do not like it, thinking that it is nepotism or favoritism. Dr. Y.K. Cheung sublets a houseman apartment to Benjamin, who sublets it to housemen for HK$3000 per month. Dr. Y.K. Cheung is assigned another surgery so he has to forfeit the AVM operation to Philip, which is a disappointment to Dr. Cheung. School principal Chan touches intern (houseman) Ching Ching buttocks twice in a crowded elevator.
3	2012	Dr. Fan observes school principal Chan urinating in public at the hospital. Chan is found to have a frontal lobe brain tumor which can cause behavioral changes. Mei Suet continues to be aloof with Dr. Fan. Mei Suet then goes to her grandmother's 71st birthday dinner where the grandmother mentions Dr. Fan's father, who is the grandmother's ex-son-in-law. Dr. Fan's father had, 20 years ago, given her a jade bracelet costing $100,000 then, compared to a gold plated painting that Mei Suet's family is giving the grandmother. Pui Chung (Onion) practices fencing and meets Dr. Y.K. Cheung's brother, but does not know of the family relationship at the time. Dr. Y.K Cheung is demoted to being second assistant in a surgery on principal Chan, doing a task that interns (housemen) usually do. However, the AC (associate consultant) had to leave the operating theatre and Dr. Y.K. Cheung saved the life of the patient by clipping a bleeding aneurysm. This is done without the AC, which can result in disciplinary action. Pui Chung continues to f**k up, so Dr. Y.K Cheung gives him an ultimatum, to pass an oral and practical exam that will be given to him in 2 weeks. Nurse Kei Kei throws a surprise party in the ward lounge for Dr. Y.K Cheung operating success, but he becomes a hothead and angry at the ruse to get him to go to the ward lounge.
4	2012	Dr. Fan, incorrectly believing that Kei Kei is Dr. Y.K. Cheung's girlfriend, Dr. Fan verbally admonishes Dr. Y.K Cheung's inconsiderate behavior for becoming angry at the surprise loune party. Pui Chung (Onion) studies hard for the oral and practical exam to be given in 2 weeks with Dr. Fan helping him suture and examine patients, including a patient with an abdominal aortic aneurysm. Dr. Fan's father (Dr. Fan Tzs-Ngok) gives a reception in his private clinie. One of the guest is a pharmacology firm's boss and his son. During the reception, Dr. Y.K. Cheung brown noses, making the AC (associate consultant, Man) dislike Dr. Y.K Cheung even more and Dr. Fan gets disgusted, too. Hong, Dr. Y.K. Cheung's handicapped brother wants to go kayaking, which their mother reluctantly agrees. Pui Chung recommends not kayaking but saves Hong from drowning. There is a mass casualty incident where a drunk driver, Kam Sai-Wing, son of a pharmaceutical company boss that went to the private clinic reception, hits several people with his vehicle. Kam Sai-Wing needs emergency brain surgery but so does his victim, who has a 50% chance of survival. That person has surgery first because Kam Sai-Wing's CT scan hasn't been done yet. Dr. Fan and Dr. Yu dispute who should be operated on first but the AC (associate consultant, Man) wants to take the victim first as his CT is done and can be used to guide surgery. Kam Sai-Wing dies after the first surgery is finished, despite Dr. Y. K. Cheungs valiant efforts to save him in the A&E department.
11	2012	Dr. Fan (Yu) rejects Onion but Y.K. leaves for a taxi before she can profess her love to him. The next day, Yu tries to say it in the cafe but Y.K. talks about something else and leaves. Y.K.'s surgical suspension is lifted so that he can do the deep brain stimulator placement in a Parkinson's Disease patient. Yu asks Y.K to dinner but, before dinner, sees him talking with a young woman, who she thinks is his girlfriend. That woman is actually Dr. John Chong's (Y.K.'s boss) wife, whom Y.K. used to date years ago. She is pregnant but has a congenital septal heart defect that makes pregnancy dangerous. Onion sweet talks with Dr. Fan's father during a dinner with the two, Yu, and Y.K, making the father think that Onion may be the boyfriend. That is what Onion wants but Dr. Fan is not interested. Later Dr. John Chong sees Y.K. and his wife so he takes his wife's smartphone, which is the same design as his, feigning a mistake. He sees Y.K., calls him on his wife's phone, says nothing. Y.K. then calls back, hears nothing, then says he is coming to see her, which makes Dr. John Chong very angry.
12	2012	There is gossip in the hospital about Y.K. and Dr. Chong's wife. The wife leaves home and stays in a hotel. The gang of 3 (Y.K., nurse played by Derek Kok, and Benjamin) talk about it over dinner. There's a lunch with Dr. Fan (Yu), her father, Onion, and Y.K. Y.K. encourages Mei-Suet to have dinner with her real father (Dr. Fan's father) by bribing her with neurosurgery tutoring. Y.K. places the deep brain stimulator in the patient then Dr. Chong leaves the room. The patient bleeds but Y.K. calls for Dr. Chong instead of being a loose cannon, despite Dr. Chong being detained doing another surgery. Y.K. and Dr. Chong's wife meet for lunch but Y.K. texted Dr. Chong to join them (using his wife's phone). The wife finds out and leaves before her husband comes. Y.K. chases after her and she collapses in the street, presumably because of her heart defect. Mei Suet lives nearby and see them. All 3 go to the wife's hotel. Dr. Chong follows them then punches Y.K in the hotel as his wife collapses again.
13	2012	Dr. Chong's wife is hospitalized. He finds out that she is pregnant. She wants to keep the baby despite the risk to her life due to her congenital heart defect. Y.K.'s brother sees Ching Ching in the bookstore as she dumps her cheating boyfriend. Mei Suet, YK, Yu and her father have dinner at home. Yu buys a phone case to give to YK, her sister does the same. Y.K. and Yu have dinner. She professes her love for him after an "I love you" cake is mistakenly delivered by the waiter but is humiliated after the mistake is corrected. Mei Suet finds out that YK got the phone case that Yu bought.
14	2012	Mei Suet wants YK. Onion overhears YK tell Ben that he is too busy with work and studies for love but not to tell anyone. Onion tells Yu, who subtly confronts YK, making him think that Ben is the leaker. Yu think she still has a chance with YK because he doesn't hate her. Andy's grandmother visits the hospital. See Andy getting scolded by YK so she yells at YK. Andy forces her to go home. She confronts YK that night, where YK sees her intermittent ptosis. Yu tells YK that she'll give him a letter daily, like a chart, in an attempt to woo him.
15	2012	Grandma is sick in the hospital, making Andy almost break down. Ming Tai, one of the houseman, wants to operate a car repair shop after internship and gets a government loan. YK wants to stay at Mercy Hospital after he finishes his training. Lung, son of the male nurse played by Derek Kok, wants his father to play with him but his father is busy studying. The kid destroys the birthday cake, shaped like a car. Andy couldn't get himself to perform insert a needle in the patient's chest when the patient has an acute tension pneumothorax so he is chewed out by Yu, who knows that Andy has watched it before.
16	2012	Andy's grandmother has post-op pneumonia. Ming Tai does first aid at the car repair shop, prompting the owner to tell him to become a doctor instead of running a car repair shop, like Ming Tai was planning. Andy successfully treats an acute tension pneumothorax this time, having failed recently. His grandmother is able to watch him recite his doctor's oath before dying.
17	2012	YK decides to stay at Mercy Hospital after he finishes training and not go into private practice with Dr. Fan. Dr. Fan is mad. Yu talks to YK about it over basketball. YK's brother asks Ching Ching to a family dinner. At the dinner, he sees the photo of a TVB mascot on her phone so he secretly tries to obtain one, which is difficult. YK is concerned that he hasn't received any letters from Yu and asks Mei Suet, who stole 2 of them. Mei Suet tells Yu over dinner that she wants YK, shocking her and getting her to withdraw.
18	2012	Mei Suet says she wants YK. The head nurse visits Lung, son of the Derek Kok nurse character. Yu's maid realizes she is senile after getting lost. She tries to quit. The family won't let her so she runs away. She is rescued by Yu's mother, who was called by the maid. Yk's brother gives Ching Ching the TVB mascot. Yu learns of a standing wheelchair and gets one, traveling to the US for 4 days, unknown to anyone.
19	2012	Onion's brother in law has a herniated disc and needs surgery. Onion and friends help run the cafe in his absence. (incomplete synopsis)

=== Diseases and medical procedures presented ===
There were much fewer medical procedures in The Hippocratic Crush 2 (On Call 36 Hours II).

- evaluation of a pedestrian hit by a motorist, possible broken arm (episode 1, patient To Tze Lam)
- obtaining a blood specimen (episode 1, episode 1)
- observation of small traumatic intracranial bleed of a pedestrian hit by a motorist (episode 1, patient To Tze Lam)
- traumatic epidural hemorrhage requiring surgery (episode 1, patient To Tze Lam)
- placement of heparin lock (episode 2, episode 2)
- frontal lobe brain tumor causing personality change (episode 3)
- traumatic hydrocephalus from Thai boxing causing increased in brain pressure (episode 3)
- unsuccessful CPR (episode 3)
- penetrating head trauma of a metal pole to the head (episode 3)
- bleeding aneurysm during removal of a frontal lobe brain tumor that was causing personality change (episode 3)
- successful blood drawing by Onion (episode 4)
- stitching a skin wound (episode 4)
- teaching of physical exam of the lungs including tapping (percussion) and use of stethoscope (episode 4)
- evaluation of a drowning victim with bleeding from the head (episode 4)
- evaluation of a pedestrian hit by a motorist and having bleeding in the brain (episode 4)
- surgery of bleeding in the brain from being hit by a motorist (episode 4)
- evaluation of traumatic injuries in a drunk driver and subsequent unsuccessful CPR (episode 4)
- successful blood drawing by Onion (episode 5)
- teaching of how to feel an abdominal aortic aneurysm (episode 5)
- traumatic pericardial tamponade and pericardial tap (episode 5)
- seeing a nicotine patch and certifying death and EKG (episode 5)
- practical exam: brain cancer 2 years after lung cancer (episode 6)
- practical exam: stitching a skin wound (episode 6)
- practical exam: detecting an abdominal aortic aneurysm by physical exam (episode 6)
- bandaging of wrist, hand, and knee wounds (episode 6)
- personality changes (seeing ghosts) from a frontal lobe brain tumor and surgery to remove tumor, bleeding from aneurysm in the operating theatre and insubordination in clipping aneurysm without supervision of a consultant (episode 6)
- clinic visit of patients with brain blister, follow-up of stroke in Uncle Fook (episode 7)
- hematuria and flank pain diagnosed as kidney stone and treated with ESWL (episode 7)
- different appearance of epidural hemorrhage and subdural hemorrhage on CT - schematic drawing (episode 8)
- hypertensive crisis requiring hospitalization (episode 8)
- urethritis in a small boy (episode 8)
- stabbed in the heart requiring surgical removal of knife (episode 9)
- open heart surgery (episode 9)
- brain bleed in a patient with heart injury requiring anti-coagulation (episode 9)
- Parkinson's Disease (episode 10)
- bipolar disorder (episode 10)
- elder abuse and bruising (episode 10)
- Cesarean section and repair of aortic rupture (episode 11)
- deep brain stimulation for Parkinson's disease (episode 12)
- intraoperative brain hemorrhage during placement of deep brain stimulator (episode 12)
- pneumothorax from central line placement (episode 14)
- myasthenia gravis with ptosis (episode 14)
- lumbar puncture (episode 14)
- revision of skull removal (episode 15)
- thymectomy (episode 15)
- tension pneumothorax (episode 15)
- gangrene of the hand (episode 15)
- tension pneumothorax (episode 16)
- post-operative pneumonia (episode 16)
- acute occlusion of iliac artery (episode 18)
- herniated disc (episode 19)
- pericardial effusion (episode 20)
- recurrence of glioma (episode 20)
- cardiomyopathy (episode 21)
- intracranial hemorrhage and contrecoup injury (episode 22)
- heart transplantation (episode 22)
- hemothorax and craniotomy resulting from fall (episode 23)
- discectomy (episode 23)
- subtotal resection of thoracic intramedullary astrocytoma (episode 24)

== Cast ==
=== The Cheung family ===
Gigi Wong	Wong Siu Un 黃笑鶯	the mother of Yat Kin and Yat Hong
Kenneth Ma	Cheung Yat Kin 張一健	Neurosurgery specialist trainee, later specialist Wong Siu Un's elder son Older brother of Cheung Yat Hong. Love interest of Fan Chi Yu and Hung Mei Suet; Husband of Fan Chi Yu
Nathan Ngai	Cheung Yat Hong 張一康	Wong Siu Un's younger son Younger brother of Cheung Yat Kin; Boyfriend of Kan Ching Ching; Killed by a glass bottle that fell from an overhead building in Episode 22

=== The Fan family ===
Cast	Role	Description
Wilson Tsui	Fan Chi Ngok 范智岳	Neurosurgery specialist Sze Yuk Lan's ex-husband Fan Tsz Yu and Hung Mei Suet's father Chong Pok Man and Cheung Yat Kin's mentor
Mary Hon	Sze Yuk Lan 施玉蘭	Fan Chi Ngok's ex-wife Fan Tsz Yu and Hung Mei Suet's mother
Tavia Yeung	Fan Tsz Yu 范子妤	Neurosurgery/Cardiothoracic surgery specialist trainee Fan Chi Ngok and Sze Yuk Lan's elder daughter Hung Mei Suet's elder sister Loved Cheung Yat Kin, later Cheung Yat Kin's wife Yeung Pui Chung's love interest.
Pat Yan	Ho Yiu 何么	Fan Family's maid

=== The Hung family ===
Cast	Role	Description
Ma Kwok Ming	Hung Kwok Wai 洪國偉	Dancing teacher Sze Yuk Lan's husband Hung Mei Suet's stepfather
Mary Hon	Sze Yuk Lan 施玉蘭	Hung Kwok Wai's wife Fan Chi Ngok's ex-wife Fan Chi Yu and Hung Mei Suet's mother
Mandy Wong	Hung Mei Suet 洪美雪	Neurosurgery specialist trainee Fan Chi Ngok and Sze Yuk Lan's younger daughter Fan Chi Yu's younger sister Hung Kwok Wai's stepdaughter Had a crush on Cheung Yat Kin; Benjamin's girlfriend at (last episode or before last episode)

=== Tsz Oi Hospital ===
==== Management ====
Cast	Role	Description
Lo Chun Shun	Lam Tai Kwong 林大光	Director
Yeung Ying Wai		Manager

==== Neurosurgery ====
Cast	Role	Description
Wilson Tsui	Fan Chi Ngok 范智岳	Neurosurgery specialist, left Mercy Hospital; Sze Yuk Lan's ex-husband Fan Tsz Yu and Hung Mei Suet's father Chong Pok Man and Cheung Yat Kin's mentor
Ben Wong	Chong Pok Man, John 莊博文	Neurosurgery department head & specialist consultant Cheung Yat Kin's superior, points against Cheung; Married to Yuen Ying
Kenneth Ma	Cheung Yat Kin 張一健	Neurosurgery specialist trainee, later specialist Chong Pok Man's subordinate Fan Tsz Yu, Yeung Pui Chung, Hung Mei Suet, Tong Hon Pong's superior Fan Chi Ngok's apprentice Fan Chi Yu's later husband
Mandy Wong	Hung Mei Suet 洪美雪	Neurosurgery specialist trainee Cheung Yat Kin's subordinate Benjamin's girlfriend
Him Law	Yeung Pui Chung 楊沛聰	Neurosurgery specialist trainee Cheung Yat Kin's subordinate Liked Fan Chi Yu; Loves Kan Ching Ching
Marcus Kwok	Tong Hon Pong 湯漢邦	Neurosurgery specialist trainee Cheung Yat Kin's subordinate
Aurelien Wan	Chiang Ying Wo 蔣應禾	Neurosurgery specialist trainee Cheung Yat Kin's work rival

==== Cardiothoracic Surgery ====
Cast	Role	Description
Raymond Cho	Chin Ho Tat 錢豪德	Cardiothoracic surgery department head & specialist consultant Married to Phoebe
Lui Hei	Fong Kit 方杰	Cardiothoracic surgery specialist trainee Wong Hoi Kei's boyfriend

==== Orthopaedics ====
Cast	Role	Description
Benjamin Yuen	Lau Ping Chan, Benjamin 劉炳燦	Orthopaedics specialist trainee Hung Mei Suet's boyfriend
Tse Cheuk Yin	Law On Dik, Andy 羅安迪	Orthopaedics specialist trainee

==== Internal Medicine ====
Cast	Role	Description
Candy Chang	Kan Ching Ching 簡晶晶	Internal Medicine specialist trainee Cheung Yat Hong's girlfriend until he died and later loves Yeung Pui Chung.

==== Nurses ====
Cast	Role	Description
Paisley Wu	To Ka Man 屠家敏	Matron; Lui Siu Yat's superior, later girlfriend
Derek Kok	Lui Siu Yat 呂小益	Nurse; To Ka Man's subordinate, later boyfriend
Catherine Chau	Wong Hoi Kei 汪海淇	Nurse; Fong Kit's girlfriend Loved Cheung Yat Kin

==== Urology ====
Cast	Role	Description
Brian Tse	Chui Shui Wah 崔瑞華	Urology specialist trainee

==== Obstetrics & Gynecology ====
Cast	Role	Description
King Lam	Wu Ming Tai 胡名泰	Obstetrics & Gynecology specialist trainee

==== Cleaner ====
Cast	Role	Description
Gigi Wong	Wong Siu Un 黃笑鶯	Cleaner; Mother of Cheung Yat Kin and Cheung Yat Hong
Li Fung	Sze To Shan 司徒珊	Cleaner
Pat Yan	Ho Yiu 何幺	Fan Family's maid

== Awards and nominations ==
2012 TVB Anniversary Awards

- Won: My Favourite Male Character (Kenneth Ma)
- Won: Most Improved Female Artiste (Mandy Wong)
- Nominated: Best Drama
- Nominated: Best Actor (Kenneth Ma)
- Nominated: My Favourite Female Character (Tavia Yeung)
- Nominated: Best Supporting Actor (Him Law)
- Nominated: Most Improved Male Artiste (Him Law)

2012 My AOD Favourite Awards

- Won: My Favourite Drama
- Won: My Favourite Actor (Kenneth Ma)
- Won: My Favourite Actress (Tavia Yeung)
- Won: My Favourite Supporting Actor (Him Law)
- Won: Top 15 TV Characters (Kenneth Ma, Tavia Young, Him Law)
- Won: Favourite On-screen Couple (Kenneth Ma, Tavia Yeung)
- Nominated: My Favourite On-screen Couple (Nathan Ngai, Candy Chang)
- Nominated: My Favourite Theme Song (Joey Yung)

== Viewership ratings ==
Season 1
	Week	Episodes	Average Points	Peaking Points	References
1	February 13–17, 2012	1 — 5	29	31	
2	February 20–24, 2012	6 — 10	30	32	
3	February 27 - March 2, 2012	11 — 15	30	33	
4	March 5–9, 2012	16 — 20	31	34	
5	March 12–16, 2012	21 — 25	33	39	
Season 2
1	November 4–8, 2013	1 — 5	26	30	
2	November 11–15, 2013	6 — 10	26	27	
3	November 18, 20–21, 2013	11 — 13	26	27	
4	November 25–29, 2013	14 — 18	25	28	
5	December 2–6, 2013	19 — 23	26	28	
6	December 9–13, 2013	24 — 28	26	28	
6	December 15, 2013	29 — 30	30	31	

== Sequel ==
A sequel, The Hippocratic Crush II was released on 4 November 2013.
