= Tavia Yeung =

Hong Kong actress (born 1979)

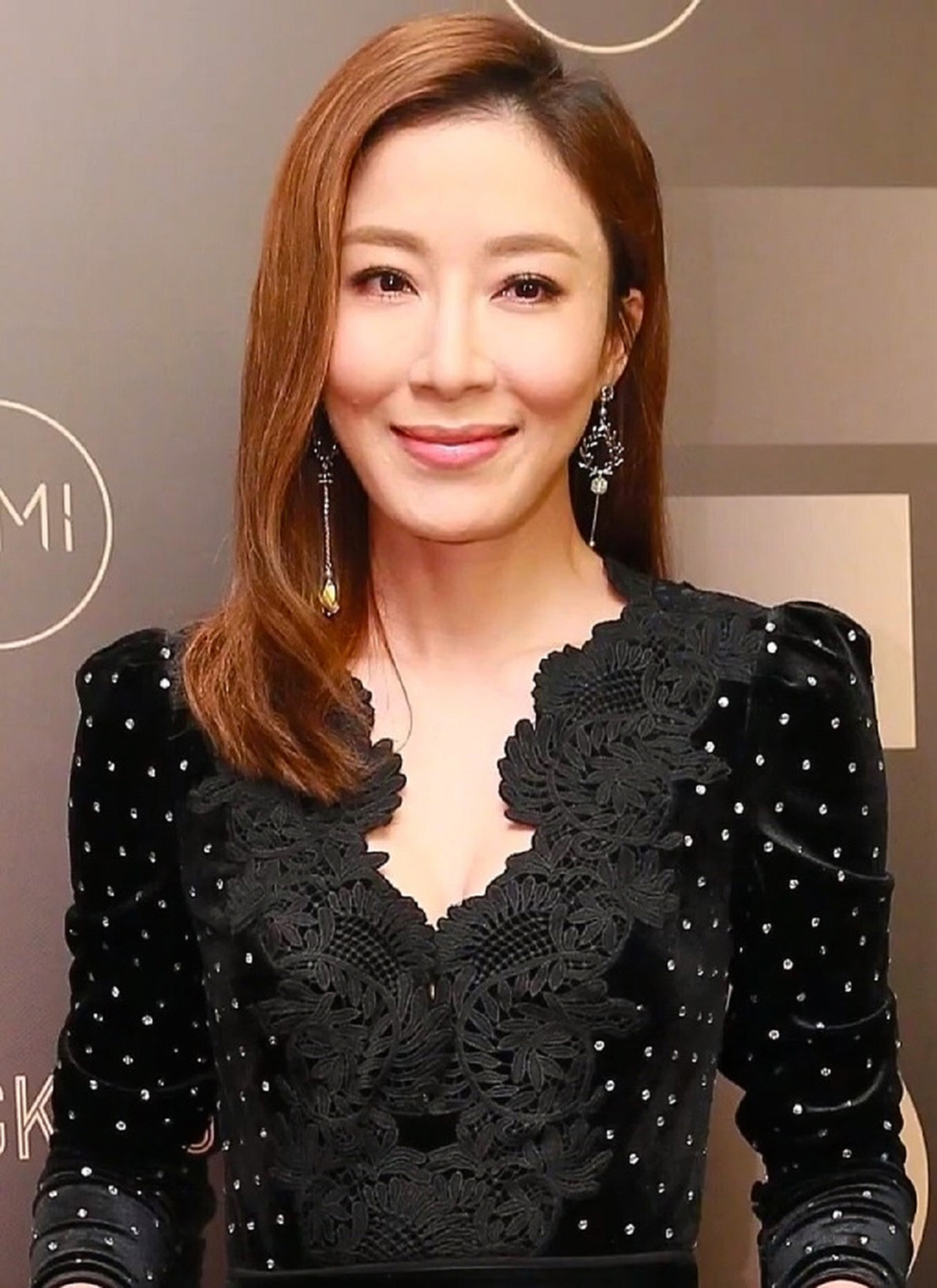
- Yeung in 2019
- Born: 30 August 1979 (age 47); British Hong Kong
- Other name: Yeung Yi (楊怡)
- Occupation: Actress
- Years active: 1999–present
- Spouse: Him Law (m. 2016)
- Children: 2
- Awards: TVB Anniversary Awards – Most Improved Female Artiste; 2003 Vigilante Force; Best Supporting Actress; 2008 Moonlight Resonance; My Favourite Female Character; 2009 Beyond the Realm of Conscience; Best Performance of the Year; 2009 Sweetness in the Salt; Beyond the Realm of Conscience; Best Actress; 2012 Silver Spoon, Sterling Shackles

Chinese name
- Traditional Chinese: 楊茜堯
- Simplified Chinese: 杨茜尧
Transcriptions
Standard Mandarin
- Hanyu Pinyin: Yáng Qiàn Yáo
Yue: Cantonese
- Jyutping: Joeng^{4} Sin^{3} jiu^{4}

Tavia Yeung Sin-yiu (Chinese: 楊茜堯; born 30 August 1979), previously known as Tavia Yeung Yi (Chinese: 楊怡), is a Hong Kong actress. She is best known for starring in the television dramas Vigilante Force (2003), Moonlight Resonance (2008), Beyond the Realm of Conscience (2009), The Mysteries of Love (2010), The Hippocratic Crush (2012) and Silver Spoon, Sterling Shackles (2012).

After graduating from acting classes at broadcasting giant TVB in 1999, Yeung began acting in music videos and made appearances as an extra in television dramas. In 2003, Yeung gained recognition for her supporting role in the drama Vigilante Force, winning the TVB Anniversary Award for Most Improved Female Artiste. In the next few years, she starred in dramas including Twin of Brothers (2004), Land of Wealth (2006) and Dicey Business (2007).

In 2008, Yeung gained widespread recognition for her role as Suen Ho Yuet in the modern drama Moonlight Resonance, winning the TVB Anniversary Award for Best Supporting Actress. With her role as the scheming Consort Lai in Beyond the Realm of Conscience, Yeung won the 2009 TVB Anniversary Award for My Favourite Female Character. In 2012, she was awarded TVB Anniversary Award for Best Actress for her performance in the drama Silver Spoon, Sterling Shackles, becoming the first TVB actress to have won all four individual TVB awards.

== Career ==
=== 1999–2007: Early work and rising popularity ===
Having graduated from the 13th TVB Artistes Training Course in 1999, Yeung acted in several music videos and first played an extra in Justice Sung II. She played several bit roles in series such as Street Fighters (2000) and When Dreams Come True (2000). Yeung's first major role came as Suen Hing Yan in The Awakening Story (2001), in which she portrayed the younger sister of main lead Maggie Cheung. She played a supporting role in Eternal Happiness, a drama based on the Qing dynasty novel of the same name.

In 2003, Yeung's breakthrough role came as the rebellious single mother Kelly in Vigilante Force. She was awarded Most Improved Female Artiste at that year's TVB Anniversary Awards. In 2004, Yeung was cast as the female lead in historical costume drama The Vigilante in the Mask, starring alongside Deric Wan. Yeung's popularity surged with the airing of Twin of Brothers, starring alongside Raymond Lam and Ron Ng. Yeung continued to be highly promoted in the coming years, starring in The Academy, Yummy Yummy, and Land of Wealth. In 2007, Yeung cast off her "girl-next-door" image in Dicey Business, taking on the role of a materialistic waitress who decides to get breast implants. Yeung starred in the blockbuster drama Heart of Greed, solidifying her status as a rising star.

=== 2008–2012: Critical success ===
In 2008, Yeung starred in the Heart of Greed spin-off, Moonlight Resonance. Her portrayal as Suen Ho Yuet earned critical acclaim and the Best Supporting Actress award at the TVB Anniversary Awards.

At the 2009 TVB Sales Presentation, it was confirmed that Yeung would be starring in the historical drama Beyond the Realm of Conscience, starring alongside Moses Chan, Charmaine Sheh, and Kevin Cheng. It was Yeung's first villainous role as the scheming Yiu Kam Ling (Consort Lai). The drama series was a huge success, becoming the most-viewed TVB series of 2009. Yeung was nominated for Best Actress at the TVB Anniversary Awards but lost to veteran Sheren Tang. At the same awards ceremony, she won My Favourite Female Character for Yiu Kam Ling and Best Performance of the Year.

In 2010, Yeung starred in the romance drama The Mysteries of Love, playing the role of Tsui Siu Lai, a police officer who falls in love with professor King (played by Raymond Lam). The series was well received, and Yeung was once again nominated for Best Actress at the annual TVB Awards. In 2011, Yeung starred in four TVB productions: The Rippling Blossom, Yes Sir, Sorry Sir!, The Other Truth, and Men With No Shadows.

In January 2011, Yeung began filming for historical palace drama The Emperor's Harem (Chinese: 后宫), starring alongside Ady An and William Feng. Yeung took on the role of the evil and conniving Imperial Consort Wan. The drama marks her Chinese television series debut. In March 2011, Yeung began filming the historical drama Three Kingdoms RPG. After filming wrapped in July, she was cast in the medical drama The Hippocratic Crush, taking on the role of Dr. Fan. The drama premiered on February 13, 2012, and received overwhelming success. For her role as Dr. Fan, Yeung was awarded Astro On Demand's My Favourite TVB Awards for Best Actress In a Leading Role. She also won My Favorite TV Character and My Favorite On-Screen Couple with co-star Kenneth Ma. She was nominated for My Favorite Female Character at the TVB Awards. In November, Yeung starred in the period drama Silver Spoon, Sterling Shackles, playing Peking opera singer Hong Tse Kwan, a feminist, who becomes the wife of patriarch Sir Arthur Chung (played by Damian Lau). On December 17, 2012, Yeung won the TVB Anniversary Award for Best Actress, becoming the only actress to have won in all four major individual categories at the TVB Anniversary Awards, winning Most Improved Female Artiste (2003), Best Supporting Actress (2008), My Favourite Female Character (2009), and Best Actress (2012).

=== 2013–present: Theatre debut ===
After winning TV queen in 2012, Yeung continued to take on lead roles in TVB productions, including reprising her role as Dr. Fan in The Hippocratic Crush II (2013). She starred in the period drama Storm in A Cocoon (2014). In May 2014, Yeung started filming for Eye in the Sky, a crime thriller in which Yeung portrays a private investigator with eidetic memory. For her role, Yeung was nominated for My Favourite TVB Actress and My Favourite TVB Female TV Character at the 2015 Starhub TVB Awards, winning the latter. After filming completed for the 2015 martial arts drama Wudang Rules in October 2014, Yeung took on her next filming project, Momentary Lapse of Reason, a period drama set in 1930s Hong Kong. In May 2015, Yeung started filming for the historical drama The Last Healer in Forbidden City, starring opposite Roger Kwok. Yeung's contract with TVB ended in April 2016, and she confirmed that she would not be renewing her contract with the television network.

Yeung made her theatre debut in the stage play I Have a Date with Spring (Chinese: 我和春天有個約會), premiering in Shanghai in January 2017. That same year she starred in the comedy stage play Oh My X 72 Tenants (Chinese: 我的X 72家房客). In 2018, Yeung reunited with Roger Kwok as on-screen partners in the drama series Another Era. Yeung portrays Hayley, the calculative wife of Leo, a business magnate. A co-production between TVB, iQiyi, and China Broadcast Film & Television Publishing House, the series first premiered on CCTV-8 and iQiyi on August 30. Despite poor viewership ratings, the series was praised for its strong cast and story. For her role as Hayley, Yeung was nominated for Best Actress at the 2018 TVB Anniversary Awards.

== Personal life ==
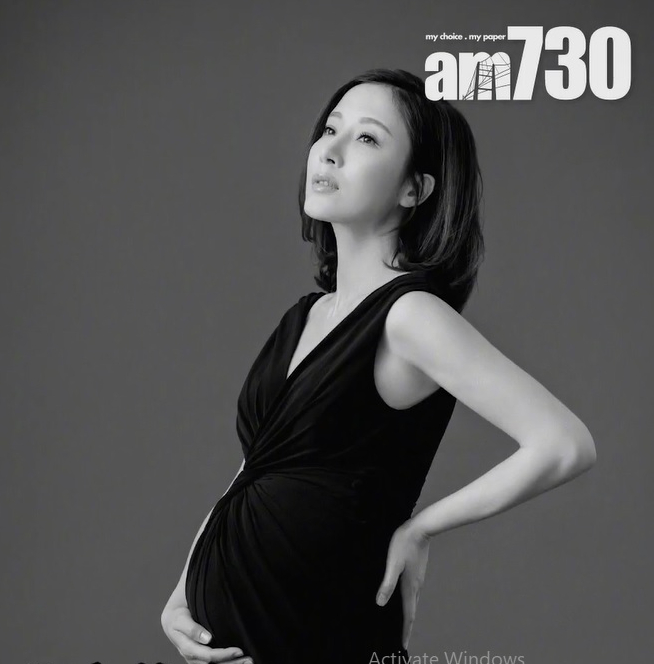
On February 12, 2020, Yeung announced her pregnancy, which was she gave birth to a girl after two months. This photo shows her pregnancy before she gave birth.

Yeung's older sister is actress Griselda Yeung. In 2011, Yeung began dating actor Him Law after filming The Hippocratic Crush. The couple married in October 2016, holding a wedding banquet at The Ritz Carlton.

On February 12, 2020, Yeung announced her pregnancy, and gave birth to a daughter at the same year. On October 26, 2020, Yeung announced on Instagram of her change of Chinese name from Yeung Yi to Yeung Sin-yiu (Chinese: 楊茜堯). Her husband, Him Law, also changed his Chinese name with Yeung. In December 2021, she gave birth to a son.

== Filmography ==
=== Film ===
Year	Title	Role	Notes
2001	Blue Moon	Bride's friend	
2003	Happy Go Lucky	Eva	

=== Television series ===
Year	Title	Role	Notes
1999	A Kindred Spirit	Joan's coworker	
1999	Detective Investigation Files IV	News reporter / Store employee / Irene	Extra
1999	Game of Deceit	Prostitute	
1999	Face to Face	News Reporter	
1999–2000	At the Threshold of an Era	Guest / Secretary / Mary	Extra
2000	Ups and Downs	Salesperson	
2000	When Dreams Come True	Jenny	
2000	The Sky is the Limit	PR agent	
2000	War of the Genders	Receptionist	
2000	The Legend of Lady Yang	Palace maid (Extra)	
2000	Armed Reaction II	News reporter	
2000	Return of the Cuckoo	Girl	
2000	Street Fighters	Chin Cho Yee	
2000	The Legendary Four Aces	Concubine / worship girl	Extra
2000	The Green Hope	Vivian Fung Wai Wai	
2001	FM701	Szeto Nga Chung	
2001	The Heaven Sword & the Dragon Sabre 2000	Bhikkhuni	Extra
2001	A Taste of Love	Television host	
2001	Gods of Honour	Imperial Consort Chan	Episodes 19 & 20
2001	Seven Sisters	Passerby	Extra
2001	The Awakening Story	Suen Hing Yan	
2002	Eternal Happiness	So Ying Suet	
2002	Golden Faith	Chung Chui Yee (Kiko)	
2003	Whatever It Takes	Moyung Suet	
2003	Vigilante Force	Kelly Wan Ka Lei	TVB Anniversary Award for Most Improved Female Artiste
2003	The 'W' Files	Wong Hung Hung	
2003	Find the Light	Lee Kwai	
2003	Love Stories at Regalia Bay	Bowie's friend	Cameo
2004	The Vigilante in the Mask	Chung Wan	
2004	Twin of Brothers	Lee Sau-ning	TVS Award for Most Potential Actress
2004	Shades of Truth	Hong Chi Sin (Siu Sin)	
2005	The Prince's Shadow	Yu Yee	Nominated - TVB Anniversary Award for Most Improved Female Artiste (Top 5)
2005	The Academy	Ho Fa	Nominated - TVB Anniversary Award for Most Improved Female Artiste (Top 5)
2005	Yummy Yummy	Chow Chi Yan (Yan)	Nominated - TVB Anniversary Award for Most Improved Female Artiste (Top 5)
2006	A Pillow Case of Mystery	Princess Tsanggak Ming Chu	Nominated - TVB Anniversary Award for My Favourite Female Character (Top 20)
2006	Land of Wealth	Kiu Tsun	Nominated - TVB Anniversary Award for Best Actress (Top 20); Nominated - TVB Anniversary Award for Most Improved Female Artiste (Top 5)
2006	Dicey Business	Tam Chu Mei (Mimi)	Nominated - TVB Anniversary Award for Most Improved Female Artiste (Top 5)
2006	Good Against Evil	Shiu On Kei (Angel)	
2007	Heart of Greed	Cheuk Man Lai (Jackie)	
2007	On the First Beat	Ho Fa	Guest appearance
2007	Fathers and Sons	Law Sei Hei (Joey)	
2007	The Building Blocks of Life	Cheung Man Ching (Freeda)	Nominated - TVB Anniversary Award for Most Improved Female Artiste (Top 5)
2008	Moonlight Resonance	Suen Ho Yuet	TVB Anniversary Award for Best Supporting Actress; StarHub TVB Awards for My Favourite TVB Female Character; NEXT Magazine's Top 10 Favourite Artists - #3; Nominated - TVB Anniversary Award for Most Improved Female Artiste (Top 5)
2009	Sweetness in the Salt	Dau Sing Suet	TVB Anniversary Award for Best Performance of the Year
2009	Beyond the Realm of Conscience	Yiu Kam Ling	TVB Anniversary Award for Best Performance of the Year; TVB Anniversary Award for My Favourite Female Character; NEXT Magazine's Top 10 Favourite Artists — #4; Nominated - TVB Anniversary Award for Best Actress (Top 5)
2010	Cupid Stupid	Kan Ngo Lam (Twinkle)	
2010	A Fistful of Stances	Au-Yeung Wai Lan (Young)	
2010	The Mysteries of Love	Tsui Siu Lai	My AOD Favourites Award for My Favourite Drama Character (1 of 10); StarHub TVB Awards for My Favourite TVB Female Character; Nominated - TVB Anniversary Award for Best Actress (Top 5); Nominated - TVB Anniversary Award for My Favourite Female Character (Top 5); Nominated - My AOD Favourites Award for My Favourite Actress in a Leading Role (Top 5)
2011	The Rippling Blossom	Choi Tse Lung	Nominated - TVB Anniversary Award for Best Actress (Top 15)
2011	Yes, Sir. Sorry, Sir!	Ho Miu Suet (Miss Ho)	
2011	The Other Truth	Hong Tze Yan (Mavis)	My AOD Favourites Award for My Favourite Drama Character (1 of 15); Nominated - TVB Anniversary Award for My Favourite Female Character (Top 15); Nominated - My AOD Favourites Award for My Favourite Actress in a Leading Role (Top 5)
2011	Men with No Shadows	Fong Siu Fong	
2011	The Emperor's Harem	Wan Zhener / Imperial Consort Wan	
2012	The Hippocratic Crush	Dr. Fan Tsz Yu	StarHub TVB Awards Singapore My Favourite Character 2012; Performing Artist 2012 Outstanding Television Performance Actress; My AOD Favourite Actress in a Leading Role 2012; My AOD Favourite On-Screen Couple (Kenneth Ma & Tavia Yeung); My AOD Favourite TV Character (1 of 15); Nominated - TVB Anniversary Award for My Favourite Female Character (Top 5)
2012	Three Kingdoms RPG	Song Yau	
2012	Silver Spoon, Sterling Shackles	Hong Tsz Kwan	TVB Anniversary Award for Best Actress; Nominated - TVB Anniversary Award for My Favourite Female Character (Top 5); STARHUB Singapore My Favourite Character 2013; STARHUB Singapore My Favourite Actress in a Leading Role 2013
2012–2013	Friendly Fire	Fong Tin Lam (Chris)	
2013	A Great Way To Care II	Lam Chung Yan (Apple/Cheung Yi Lam)	
2013	The Hippocratic Crush II	Dr. Fan Tsz Yu	Nominated - TVB Anniversary Award for My Favourite Female Character (Top 15); Nominated - TVB Anniversary Award for Best Actress; TVB Stars Award Malaysia 2013 for My Favourite TV character (1 of 15); TVB Stars Award Malaysia 2013 for My Favourite On-Screen Couple
2014	Storm in a Cocoon	Tong Bing-bing	
2014–2015	Noblesse Oblige	Wai Lam	
2015	Eye in the Sky	Ng Chan Nei (Jan)	
2015	Wudang Rules	Lok Yeung	
2015	Momentary Lapse Of Reason	Leung Sam	
2016	The Last Healer In Forbidden City	Fuk Ling	
2018	Another Era	Hayley Cheung	Nominated - TVB Anniversary Award for Best Actress (Top 5)
2022	Modern Dynasty	Yan Sum (Sammie Ma)	
2024	Darkside of the Moon	Yu Mun-yuet (Moon)	

== Awards and achievements ==
2003

- 3 Weekly - Most Improved Female Artiste as "Kelly Wan" in Vigilante Force
- 36th TVB Anniversary Awards - Most Improved Female Artiste as "Kelly Wan" in Vigilante Force

2007

- NEXT Magazine - WHY Best Fashion Style Award

2008

- 41st TVB Anniversary Awards - Best Supporting Actress as "Suen Ho Yuet" in Moonlight Resonance
- Mingpao Newspaper 40th Anniversary Awards - Performance Power Award as "Suen Ho Yuet" in Moonlight Resonance

2009

- Astro Wah Lai Toi's 5th Drama Awards – Favourite Character as “Tam Chu Mei” in Dicey Business
- NEXT Magazine – Top 10 Favourite Artistes – Rank #3
- 42nd TVB Anniversary Awards – My Favourite Female Character as “Yiu Gam Ling” in Beyond the Realm of Conscience
- 42nd TVB Anniversary Awards – Best Performance of the Year

2010

- Singapore's 1st StarHub TVB Awards – My Favourite TVB Female Character as “Suen Ho Yuet” in Moonlight Resonance
- NEXT Magazine – PHILIPS Extraordinary Star Award
- NEXT Magazine – Top 10 Favourite Artistes – Rank #4
- Astro On Demand's My Favourite TVB Series Awards – Top 10 My Favourite TV Character as “Tsui Siu Lai” in The Mysteries of Love
- Yahoo! Asia Buzz Awards – Most Searched TV Female Hong Kong Artiste

2011

- NEXT Magazine – Top 10 Favourite Artistes – Rank #5
- Singapore's 2nd StarHub TVB Awards – My Favourite TVB Female Character as “Tsui Siu Lai” in The Mysteries of Love
- Fashion & Beauty's OL Most Loved Brand Spokesperson – Tavia Yeung for 2B Alternative
- Next Magazine – Top 10 Healthy Image Hong Kong Star
- Astro On Demand's My Favourite TVB Series Awards – Top 15 My Favourite TV Character as “Mavis Hong” in The Other Truth

2012

- NEXT Magazine – Top 10 Favourite Artistes – Rank #8
- Singapore's 3rd StarHub TVB Awards – My Favourite TVB Female Character as “Fan Chi Yu" in The Hippocratic Crush
- Singapore's 3rd Starhub TVB Awards – Most Glamorous Female Artiste
- Astro On Demand's My Favourite TVB Series Awards – Top 15 My Favourite TV Character as “Fan Chi Yu” in The Hippocratic Crush
- Astro On Demand's My Favourite TVB Series Awards – My Favourite On-Screen Couple (Kenneth Ma & Tavia Yeung) in The Hippocratic Crush
- Astro On Demand's My Favourite TVB Series Awards – My Favourite Actress in a Leading Role as “Fan Chi Yu” in The Hippocratic Crush
- 45th TVB Anniversary Awards – Best Actress as “Hong Tsz Kwan” in Silver Spoon, Sterling Shackles

2013

- Shanghai Fashion Weekly Magazine's 3rd Annual Best Beauty Advisor Awards - Public Welfare Ambassador Award
- Hong Kong Performing Arts Guild - Outstanding Performance By A Television Actress Award
- NEXT Magazine – Top 10 Favourite Artistes – Rank #3
- Prince Jewellery & Premier Cup Awards for The Best In Entertainment - The Best In Television Award
- Singapore's 4th StarHub TVB Awards – My Favourite TVB Female Character as “Hong Tsz Kwan" in Silver Spoon, Sterling Shackles
- Singapore's 4th Starhub TVB Awards – My Favourite TVB Actress
- Astro TVB Star Awards 2013 - Top 15 My Favourite TVB Character as “Fan Chi Yu" in The Hippocratic Crush II
- Astro TVB Star Awards 2013 - My Favourite TVB On-Screen Couple (Kenneth Ma & Tavia Yeung) in The Hippocratic Crush II
- 46th TVB Anniversary Awards - TVBC China's Most Popular TVB Female Artist

2014

- Stars of Weibo 2013 - Weibo's Most Powerful Hong Kong TV Female Character (Tavia Yeung as “Fan Chi Yu" in The Hippocratic Crush II)
