= Kong Hon =

- Chinese: 江漢
- Born: Keung Wing-ming (姜永明); September 10, 1939; Liaoyang County, Fengtian Province, Manchukuo
- Died: December 7, 2017 (aged 78); Hong Kong Sanatorium & Hospital, Happy Valley, Hong Kong
- Occupation: Actor
- Years active: 1960s–2012
- Spouse: Wong Siu-yin
- Children: 2

Chinese name
- Traditional Chinese: 江漢
Transcriptions
Standard Mandarin
- Hanyu Pinyin: Jiāng Hàn
- Musical career
- Also known as: Jiang Han

Kong Hon (September 10, 1939 – December 7, 2017) was a Chinese actor and director from Hong Kong. Kong was credited with over 90 films as an actor and 2 films as a director.

== Career ==
Kong made his acting debut at an early age and subsequently appeared in many films. In 1979, he joined Rediffusion Television and acted in dramas, including Blowing in the Wind, The Eight Fairies and Empress Wu. He later appeared in several TVB productions from the 1990s, and was noted for portraying wealthy figures in series such as Healing Hands and Burning Flame.

Kong's final role was in the 2012 series Three Kingdoms RPG.

== Filmography ==
=== Films ===
- 1950 Fury in Their Hearts
- 1967 Confused Love
- 1967 The Divorce Brinkmanship
- 2006 My Name Is Fame - Fai's father.

=== Television series ===
- Empress Wu (1984)
- Detective Investigation Files II (1995)
- Eternal Happiness (2002)
- Vigilante Force (2003)
- Lady Fan (2004)
- Women on the Run (2005)
- Revolving Doors of Vengeance (2005)
- La Femme Desperado (2006)
- Burning Flame III (2009)
- Born Rich (2009)
- A Great Way to Care (2011–13)
- Three Kingdoms RPG (2012)

== Personal life ==
Kong's wife was Wong Siu-yin, an actress. They had two children. Their son, Jeffrey Cheung, is a former professional footballer.

On 7 December 2017, Kong died at the Hong Kong Sanatorium & Hospital in Hong Kong. He was 78 years old.
