= Dexter Young =

Hong Kong actor

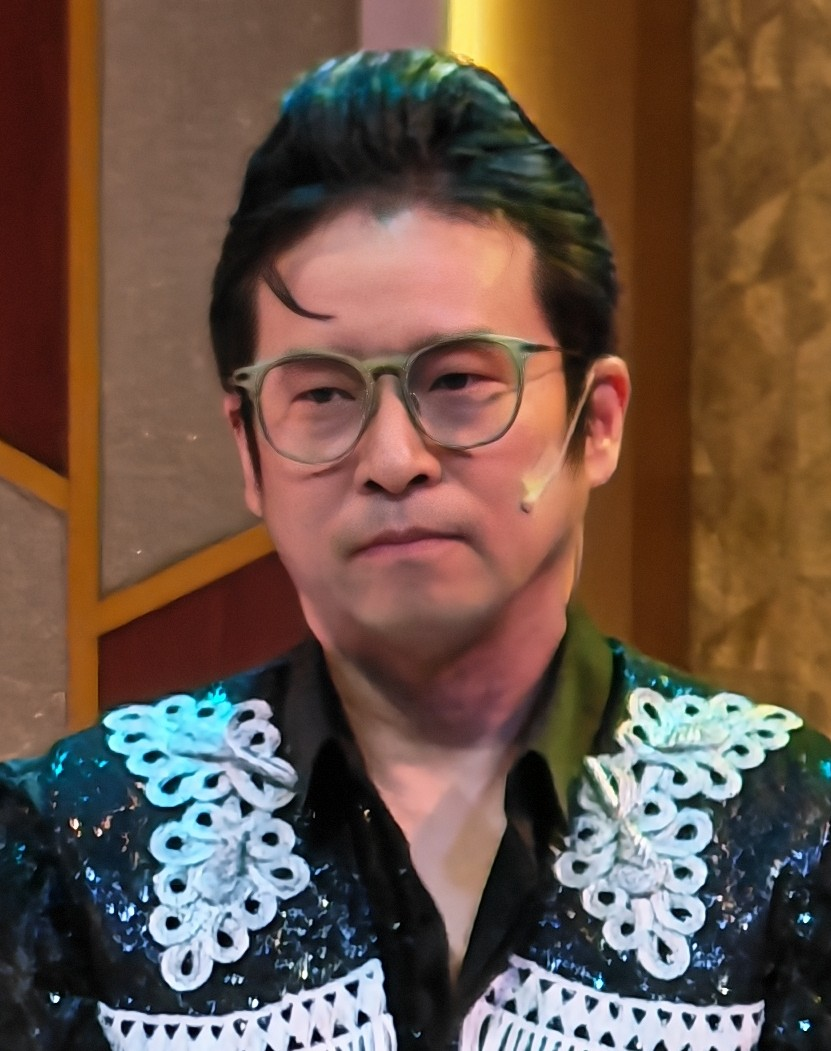
- Young in December 2025
- Born: 25 March 1975 (age 51); Hong Kong
- Occupation: Actor
- Parent: Connie Chan (陳寶珠)

Chinese name
- Traditional Chinese: 楊天經
- Simplified Chinese: 杨天经
Transcriptions
Standard Mandarin
- Hanyu Pinyin: Yáng Tiānjīng
Yue: Cantonese
- Jyutping: Joeng^{4} Tin^{1} Ging^{1}

Dexter Young (a.k.a. Yeung Tin-king, Chinese: 楊天經, born 25 March 1975) is a Hong Kong actor who joined TVB in 2007. He is the son of well-known Hong Kong actress Connie Chan.

He joined the local entertainment industry in 2001 after earning a bachelor's degree in economics from the University of Texas at Austin, and have since been an actor on stage and on TV.

== Theatre ==
- Forever Teresa Teng (2002)
- Love During the Epidemic (2004)
- Dance Again (2005)
- A Sentimental Journey (2005)

== Filmography ==
Year	Title	Role	Notes
2008	Wasabi Mon Amour 和味濃情	Ma Teen Sum 馬田心	
2008	Moonlight Resonance 溏心風暴之家好月圓	Cheng Ka Lok (Kelvin) 鄭家樂	
2009	E.U. 學警狙擊	Ju Weng Fok/Lat Gay 朱永福/辣雞	
2009	The Winter Melon Tale 大冬瓜	Suen Ying Sing 孫應聲	
2011	Relic of an Emissary 洪武三十二	Chu Pak 朱柏	
2011	Ghetto Justice 怒火街頭	Yeung Kwok Kui 楊國駒	
2012	Queens of Diamonds and Hearts		
2014	The Borderline	Fung Wai-hung	
2014-15	To Be or Not to Be	Anson's lawyer	ep. 22 to 25
2015	Once Upon a Song	Dr. Charles Kwok	
2015	The Menu	Mok Wun-choi	
2015	Beyond the Rainbow	Wong Shue-ban	
2016	Cold War 2		
