= Born Rich (TV series) =

Hong Kong television series

- Official poster
- Also known as: Root of Evil
- 富貴門
- Genre: Drama
- Created by: Chong Wai-kin
- Written by: Yip Sai-hong; Lee Ho; Wong Hiu-chong; Cheung Ying-wai; Chow Yin-lan; Cat Kwan; Lam Chung-pong; Law Pui-ching; Tam Kim-wai
- Directed by: Man Wai-hung; So Man-chung; Hung Kam-fat; Lee Kin-wo; Yip Chun-fai; Kwok Wai-sing
- Starring: Ray Lui; Gallen Lo; Joe Ma; Anita Yuen; Kenix Kwok; Jaime Chik; Nancy Sit; Benz Hui; Lau Siu-ming; Kenneth Ma; Sharon Chan; Vincent Wong; Angelina Lo
- Theme music composer: Chan Chung-hung
- Opening theme: On the Verge of Eternity (差一剎的地老天荒) by Gallen Lo
- Ending theme: Two Rounds of Life (兩生關) by Kay Tse
- Composers: Adrian Chow; Cousin Fung
- Country of origin: Hong Kong
- Original language: Cantonese
- No. of episodes: 41

Production
- Executive producer: Chong Wai-kin
- Production locations: Hong Kong; Sabah, Malaysia
- Camera setup: Multi camera
- Running time: 42 minutes (each)
- Production company: TVB

Original release
- Network: TVB Jade
- Release: October 19 – December 13, 2009

Born Rich
- Title screen shot
- Traditional Chinese: 富貴門
- Simplified Chinese: 富贵门
- Literal meaning: "Gate of Wealth"
Transcriptions
Standard Mandarin
- Hanyu Pinyin: Fù Guì Mén
Yue: Cantonese
- Jyutping: Fu3 Gwai3 Mun4

Born Rich (Traditional Chinese: 富貴門, literally Gate of Wealth) is a 2009 Hong Kong television drama produced by TVB under executive producer Chong Wai-kin. The drama was promoted as TVB's "grand production" for 2009. Running for 41 episodes, the last two episodes were of two hours each.

== Synopsis ==
Banker Marcus Cheuk mistakes con artist Sha Fu-loi for his half brother Cheuk Yatming, fortuitously elevating the swindler to one of the leading figures in the banking industry. The lost and found brotherhood has blinded Marcus to Fu-loi's real nature and intentions.

Marcus is kidnapped overseas by a group of rioters. He undergoes a dramatic personality change after the incident. His wife Connie has tried her best to console him but still cannot help him get over the unpleasant experience. Longing for more comfort and support, Marcus gets back with his ex-lover Angie. Connie is heartbroken to learn about the affair and it has left the broken mirror that can't be mended.

The identity of Cheuk Yatming gives Fu-loi not only a sense of family warmth but also a sweet taste of romance. He finds himself in love with Marcus's younger sister Rene. Rene is also attracted to Fu-loi, but thinking that they are true biological siblings, she decides to keep her love under wraps and stays with her longtime admirer Topman instead. Later on, Yatming kisses her and, thinking that her brother loves her in the wrong way, goes to Sabah to try forget about Yatming.Topman follows her there and they fall back in love after Topman finds the ring she throws into the ocean. This comes as a huge blow to Fu-loi. He is not willing to lose his love, but neither can he reveal his real identity. Caught up in the dilemma between love and money, Fu-loi finally chooses the fortune road of no return.

In the end the Sha brothers return to Sabah. From the suicide attempt Fu-loi loses his memory and recollection of his swindling past. Brother Po-loi eventually opens a pastry shop with Yan Dai. While failing to find the fortune, the Sha brothers return to a simpler and happier life in Sabah.

The film's plot is centred around financial conflicts, a love triangle, and ethical dilemmas.

== Reception ==
Although the series, along with Beyond the Realm of Conscience, were both heavily promoted as TVB's annual grand production, the series' ratings fell flat, when compared with its counterpart. While Beyond the Realm of Conscience regularly drew viewing shares of over 90%, Born Rich only drew viewing shares of around 80%, with only the final two weeks of episodes drawing over 90% viewing shares.

In addition, some members of the cast, most notably Ray Lui, have come out and criticized the series' plot as "poor", even after the cast offered suggestions to the scriptwriters on how to improve it.

== Major characters ==
Main characters from left: Angie Tung (Kenix Kwok), Connie Hoh (Jaime Chik), Marcus Cheuk (Ray Lui), Rene Cheuk (Anita Yuen), Yatming Cheuk (Gallen Lo), Topman (Joe Ma).

=== Cheuk family ===
==== First generation ====
- Cheuk Song-hei (Traditional Chinese: 卓崇禧, portrayed by Lau Kong): The founder and first CEO of CosmoBank. A year and a half before the timeline of the series begins, Song-hei went to Sabah, Malaysia, and was not heard from since. A search effort bankrolled by the Cheuk family begin, and in Episode 6, it is discovered that Song-hei has died.
- Musa "Mu Jie" Sheung (常開眉, portrayed by Nancy Sit): Widow of Cheuk Song-hei. She was an actress before her marriage to Song-hei.
- Lau Fung-king (劉鳳瓊, portrayed by Natalie Tong): Mistress of Cheuk Song-hei, and has a son with him. She only appears in flashbacks.

==== Second generation ====
- Marcus Cheuk (卓一元, portrayed by Ray Lui): Son of Cheuk Song-hei. He is the acting CEO of CosmoBank during Cheuk Song-hei's disappearance, and later succeeds his late father as CEO of the bank.
- Connie Ho (賀爵年, portrayed by Jaime Chik): Wife of Marcus. She is a housewife for many years, until her divorce with Marcus, when she returns to work as the head of a PR firm.
- Cheuk Yat-ming (卓一鳴): Illegitimate son of Cheuk Song-hei. He lived in Malaysia for all of his short life. His identity was stolen by his former neighbour Sha Fu-loi, who is a professional swindler.
- Rene Cheuk (卓一心, portrayed by Anita Yuen): Daughter of Cheuk Song-hei and head of the Communications Department of CosmoBank.
- "Topman" Ko Tok-man (高拓民, portrayed by Joe Ma): Rene's husband and COO of CosmoBank.

==== Third generation ====
- Cheuk Chi-kei (卓子琦, portrayed by Elkie Chong): Daughter of Marcus and Connie.
- Cheuk Chi-wai (卓子維, portrayed by Coleman Tam): Son of Marcus and Connie.

==== Others ====
- Wong Lai-shui (王麗水, portrayed by Alice Fung So-bor): The Cheuk family maid.

=== Tung family ===
==== First generation ====
- Tung Tian-juk (董天祝, portrayed by Lau Siu-ming): Commonly referred to as Juk Sir (祝Sir), he had a long and very friendly relationship with Song-hei and is the Vice-Chairman of the CosmoBank Board. He had a hand in putting together Marcus with his (later) wife, Connie.

==== Second generation ====
- Angie Tung (董令姿, portrayed by Kenix Kwok): A barrister, she is later retained as the legal consultant of the Cheuk family. She has an affair with Marcus, which ended Marcus's marriage with Connie Ho. Angie dies in car accident.

=== Sha family ===
- Sha Fu-loi (沙富來, portrayed by Gallen Lo): A professional swindler, he steals the late Cheuk Yat-ming's identity in order to garner the vast wealth of the Cheuk family. Using his stolen identity, he is later able to become the Deputy CEO of CosmoBank. He also has a crush on Rene, who is engaged to Topman.
- Sha Po-loi (沙寶來, portrayed by Kenneth Ma): Younger brother of Fu-loi, he is able to work on CosmoBank's General Services Department as a low-level worker.

=== Dai family ===
==== First generation ====
- Dai Wing-luk (戴永祿, portrayed by Benz Hui): He is the General Manager of CosmoBank, and is often called the "Grand Manager of General Affairs" (大總管).
- Eva Pao (鮑笑雁, portrayed by Angelina Lo: Wife of Wing-luk and fraternal sister of Musa Sheung.

==== Second generation ====
- Yan Dai (戴亦欣, portrayed by Sharon Chan): A Supervisor of the Personal Finance Division of CosmoBank. She falls in love with Fu-loi.

=== CosmoBank workers ===
==== Board of directors ====
- Ma Cheung Wai-kiu (馬蔣卉翹, portrayed by Lily Leung)
- Man O-kwan (文傲君, portrayed by Yu Tze-ming)
- Lai Kay-pui (賴紀培, portrayed by Kwong Chor-fai)
- Lee Wai-shun(李唯信, portrayed by Kong Hon)

==== Other workers ====
- Herman Lai (黎允才, portrayed by Lee Shing-Cheung): CFO of CosmoBank.
- Szeto Fung (司徒豐, portrayed by Vincent Wong): Yan's boyfriend and a Personal Banking manager at CosmoBank.

== Awards nominations ==
- TVB Anniversary Awards (2009)
  - Best Drama
  - Best Actor (Ray Lui)
  - Best Actor (Gallen Lo)
  - Best Actress (Anita Yuen)
  - Best Actress (Jaime Chik)
  - Best Actress (Kenix Kwok)
  - My Favourite Male Character (Ray Lui)
  - My Favourite Male Character (Gallen Lo)
  - My Favourite Female Character (Anita Yuen)
  - My Favourite Female Character (Jaime Chik)
  - My Favourite Female Character (Kenix Kwok)
  - Best Supporting Actor (Kenneth Ma)Top 5
  - Most Improved Female Artiste (Sharon Chan)Top 5

== Viewership Ratings ==
	Week	Episodes	Average Points	Peaking Points	References
1	October 19–23, 2009	1 — 5	31	33	
2	October 26–30, 2009	6 — 10	29	32	
3	November 2–6, 2009	11 — 15	28	30	
4	November 9–13, 2009	16 — 20	28	31	
5	November 16–20, 2009	21 — 24	28	30	
6	November 23–27, 2009	25 — 29	29	—	
7	November 30 - December 3, 2009	30 — 33	28	—	
8	December 7–11, 2009	34 — 39	30	—	
8	December 13, 2009	40 — 41	36	41	
