= Extra role performance =

Voluntary employee behavior

Extra-role performance behaviours are certain behaviours of employees, which are not part of their formal job requirements as they cannot be prescribed or required in advance for a given job but they help in the smooth functioning of the organization as a social system. Some of the extra role performance behavior are: helping coworkers with a job related problem; accepting orders without fuss; tolerating temporary impositions without complaint; maintaining cleanliness and physical hygiene of the workplace; promoting a work climate that is tolerable and minimizes the distractions created by interpersonal conflict; and protecting and conserving organizational resources etc. (Bateman & Organ, 1983).

== Sources ==
- Bateman, Thomas S.; Dennis W. Organ (December 1983). "Job satisfaction and the good soldier: the relationship between affect and employee 'citizenship'". The Academy of Management Journal. 26 (4): 587–95. ISSN 0001-4273. JSTOR 255908.
