= Mary Hon =

Hong Kong actress

- Born: 1 July 1954 (age 71); British Hong Kong
- Occupation: Actress
- Years active: 1976 – present
- Spouse: To Yin-ge (1989 – present）

Chinese name
- Traditional Chinese: 韓馬利
- Simplified Chinese: 韩马利
Transcriptions
Standard Mandarin
- Hanyu Pinyin: Hán Mǎlì
Yue: Cantonese
- Jyutping: Hon3 Ma2 Lei4
- Musical career
- Origin: Hong Kong
- Label: TVB
- Website: http://weibo.com/maryhon Mary Hon at Sina Weibo

Mary Hon is an actress from TVB in Hong Kong.

== Filmography ==
=== TV dramas ===
| Year | Title | Role | TVB Anniversary Awards |
|---|---|---|---|
| 1979 | Chor Lau-heung | Shum Wai-lam | |
| 1988 | Twilight of a Nation | Imperial Consort Yi | |
| 1992 | Rage and Passion | Lam Ling-so | |
| 1995 | Detective Investigation Files | Ching Ka Hei's wife | |
| 1999 | At the Threshold of an Era | Ma Lo Bo Chu | |
| 2000 | The Green Hope | Wong Yuen-fan | |
| 2002 | Eternal Happiness | Kakmaisi | |
| 2007 | Fathers and Sons | Li Dai-choi | Nominated - Best Supporting Actress (Top 5) |
| 2008 | Wasabi Mon Amour | Yim Yuk | |
| 2008 | D.I.E. | | |
| 2008 | A Journey Called Life | Ho Bo-Ling | |
| 2008 | The Money-Maker Recipe | | |
| 2008 | Speech of Silence | | |
| 2008 | Moonlight Resonance | Geun | |
| 2008 | When Easterly Showers Fall on the Sunny West | | |
| 2008 | Off Pedder | Law Suet-sin | |
| 2008-2009 | Pages of Treasures | Ngan Yu-yuk | |
| 2009 | The Threshold of a Persona | | |
| 2009 | Sweetness in the Salt | Nip Cheung-See | |
| 2009 | Beyond the Realm of Conscience | Empress Dowager Cheng | Nominated - Best Supporting Actress (Top 15) |
| 2010 | In the Eye of the Beholder | Yan Sau Wai | |
| 2010 | OL Supreme | Lam | |
| 2010 | The Mysteries of Love | Chiang Wai-chu (Victoria) | |
| 2010 | Can't Buy Me Love | Mai Yan-che | |
| 2010 | Twilight Investigation | Leung Wai-kuen | |
| 2010-2011 | Links to Temptation | Ho Hoon | |
| 2011 | A Great Way to Care | Kun's mother | |
| 2011 | The Rippling Blossom | Hong Sau-hing | |
| 2011 | Dropping by Cloud Nine | Mrs. Chu | |
| 2011 | Relic of an Emissary | Consort Ong | |
| 2011 | The Other Truth | Tsui Siu-mei | |
| 2011 | Lives of Omission | Laura Law Hiu-ling | |
| 2011 | Forensic Heroes III | Cheung Fung-ping | |
| 2012 | Let It Be Love | Ho Chun Kiu | |
| 2012 | The Hippocratic Crush | Sze Yuk Lan | |
| 2012 | Three Kingdoms RPG | Lady Choi | Nominated - Best Supporting Actress |
| 2012 | Silver Spoon, Sterling Shackles | Koo Sam-lan | Nominated - TVB Anniversary Award for Best Actress |
| 2012-2013 | Friendly Fire | Helen Man Ying | |
| 2013 | Inbound Troubles | Mary | |
| 2013 | A Great Way to Care II | Au-Leung Fung Yuk | |
| 2013 | Come Home Love | Lung Kiu; But Yiu Tze | |
| 2013 | Always and Ever | Hon Dan | |
| 2013 | Will Power | Ching Shuk-hing | |
| 2013 | The Hippocratic Crush II | Sze Yuk-lan | |
| 2014 | Outbound Love | Dou Wai-sum | |
| 2014 | Ghost Dragon of Cold Mountain | Empress Dowager Gung Shun-bik | |
| 2014 | Rear Mirror | Elaine Fong | |
| 2014 | Line Walker | Rose Fung | |
| 2014 | Come On, Cousin | Barbara | |
| 2015 | Madam Cutie On Duty | Ga May Yung | |
| 2015 | Raising the Bar | Holly's mother | |
| 2015 | Romantic Repertoire | Yim Ka-lai | |
| 2015 | With or Without You | The Empress Dowager | |
| 2015 | Angel In-the-Making | Lorna Dai | |
| 2015 | Under the Veil | Mrs. Dyun | |
| 2018 | Daddy Cool | Nancy | |
| 2018 | Deep in the Realm of Conscience | Chou Yu Yin | |
| 2020 | Brutally Young | Kwong Bo-chu | |
| 2020 | Life After Death | Mavis' mother | |
| 2022 | ICAC Investigators 2022 | | |
| 2024 | No Return | Chow Gee Ning | |
| TBA | The Line Watchers | | |

== Personal life ==
Hon's husband is To Yin Gor. In 2019, Hon was diagnosed with meningitis and she was hospitalized.
