= Coin's End =

Coin's End is a 2001 role-playing game adventure published by Kenzer & Company for Dungeons & Dragons.

== Plot summary ==
Coin's End is an adventure in which 6th‑level player characters enter the barbarian Lands of Skarrna to face the rising wizard Daresh, racing to destroy the corrupt Coin of Darkness before her growing humanoid armies and its power grow unstoppable.

== Reviews ==
- Backstab #34
- Realms of Fantasy
- Asgard #2 (Aug., 2001 PDF)
