= Wasabi Mon Amour =

- Official poster
- 和味濃情
- Genre: Modern Drama
- Starring: Michael Tao; Louisa So; Bernice Liu; Paul Chun; Dexter Yeung; Joyce Tang
- Opening theme: "不可不愛" by Eric Suen
- Country of origin: Hong Kong
- Original language: Cantonese
- No. of episodes: 20

Production
- Producer: Chong Wai-kin
- Running time: 45 minutes (approx.)

Original release
- Network: TVB
- Release: January 28 – February 22, 2008

Wasabi Mon Amour (Traditional Chinese: 和味濃情) is a TVB modern drama series broadcast in January 2008.

== Synopsis ==
Melt in mouth
Glow of heart
Come experience different tastes of life

Japanese cuisine chef Chung Lai-Wo (Michael Tao) has long been in love with his childhood friend Ko Yau-Mei (Louisa So), who is always interested in pursuing a career in showbiz. To realize her dream, Wo lies to the press and refers to Mei as "a most talented chef of the time". With Wo's help, Mei has finally landed a job as the host of a food program. As Mei is completely clueless about cooking, Wo decides to do her a favor by offering to be her assistant, which irritates his mentor Ko Shau (Paul Chun), also father of Mei, beyond measure.

Although the food program turns out to be very popular, Mei often gets picked on by her half sister Ko Yim-Lai (Bernice Liu) while at work. Lai is angry with Shau for being bad to her mother and she means to make things difficult for Mei as revenge. In order to boost her fame and the ratings, Mei reveals to the media the private life of Wo and herself, consequently leading Wo's career to a downfall. To escape from the misery of failure in both career and relationship, Wo decides to leave for Japan and starts a new life there. Shau feels the need to give Mei a lesson and resolves to reveal the truth to the press. In the meantime, Lai has also exposed a long-kept secret of Shau, which has severely tarnished his reputation in his field overnight.

== Cast ==
| Cast | Role | Description |
|---|---|---|
| Michael Tao | Chung Lai-Wo 鍾禮和 | Japanese Chef; Ko Yau-Mei's ex-boyfriend. Ko Sau's student. |
| Louisa So | Ko Yau-Mei (阿Me/Ah Me) 高柔美 | Lady Iron Chef; Chung Lai-Wo's ex-girlfriend. Ko Sau's daughter. Ko Yau-Lai's older sister. |
| Bernice Liu | Yim Lai/Ko Yau-Lai (Ally) 嚴麗/高柔麗 | Heat Group Company Manager; Ko Sau's daughter Ko Yau-Mei's younger sister. |
| Paul Chun | Ko Sau 高守 | Japanese Restaurant Owner/Chef; Ko Yau-Mei and Ko Yau-Lai's father. Chung Lai-Wo's mentor. |
| Joyce Tang | Tam Bo-Bo 譚寶寶 | Noodle Shop Owner |
| Dexter Yeung (楊天經) | Ma Tin-Sam 馬田心 | Heat Group Company Videographer; Ma Choi-Yat's younger brother. |
| Kara Hui | Ko Kwai 高桂 | Japanese Restaurant Waitress; Ko Sau's younger sister. |
| Patrick Dunn | Ma Choi-Yat 馬賽一 | Heat Group Company CEO; Ma Tin-Sam's older brother. |

== Viewership ratings ==
| | Week | Episode | Average Points | Peaking Points | References |
|---|---|---|---|---|---|
| 1 | January 28–February 1, 2008 | 1 — 5 | 29 | 32 | |
| 2 | February 5–February 8, 2008 | 6 — 10 | 24 | 30 | |
| 3 | February 11–February 15, 2008 | 11 — 15 | 29 | 32 | |
| 4 | February 18–February 21, 2008 | 16 — 19 | 31 | 35 | |
| 4 | February 22, 2008 | 20 | 32 | 33 | |

== Awards and nominations ==
41st TVB Anniversary Awards (2008)

- "Best Drama"
- "Best Actor in a Supporting Role" (Paul Chun - Ko Sau)
- "Best Actress in a Supporting Role" (Bernice Liu - Ally Ko Yau-Lai)
