= List of TVB dramas in 2024 =

These are the dramas that releases by TVB

This is a list of television serial dramas released by TVB in 2024, including highest-rated television dramas and award ceremonies.

== Top ten drama series in ratings ==
The following is a list of TVB's top serial dramas in 2024 by viewership ratings. The recorded ratings include premiere week, final week, finale episode, and the average overall count of live Hong Kong viewers (in millions).

Highest-rated drama series of 2024
Rank	English title	Chinese title	Average	Peak	Premiere week	Final week	Series finale	HK viewers (millions)
1	Forensic Heroes VI: Redemption	法證先鋒VI：倖存者的救贖	25.6		20.4	20	19.9	
2	The Heir to the Throne	家族榮耀之繼承者	25.5		21.7	21.9	22.9	
3	No Room For Crime	反黑英雄	24.3		21.4	20.9	22	
4	Sinister Beings 2	逆天奇案2	23.9		19.8	18.4	21.6	
5	The Airport Diary	飛常日誌	23.6	21.9	21.2	20.8	21.5	
6	No Return	巾幗梟雄之懸崖	23.5		20.7	20.3		
7	Big Biz Duel	企業強人	23.2		19.72	18.8	20.7	
8	Call of Destiny	異空感應	21.8		18.3			
9	ICAC Investigators 2024	廉政行動2024	21.4		17.9	17.9	17.9	
10	Darkside of the Moon	黑色月光	21.2		18.3			

== Awards ==
Category/Organization	TVB Anniversary Awards 19 Jan 2025
TVB Greater Bay Area Most Favourite Variety and Documentary Program	No Poverty Land Season 4 One Belt One Road
TVB Greater Bay Area Most Favourite Drama	Darkside of the Moon
TVB Greater Bay Area Most Favourite Actor	Kenneth Ma - The Airport Diaries
TVB Greater Bay Area Most Favourite Actress	Tavia Yeung - Darkside of the Moon
Best Dressed Female Artist on Red Carpet	Venus Wong
Best Dressed Male Artist on Red Carpet	Moses Chan
Best TVB Male Host	Albert Au Wing Kuen
Best TVB Female Host	Janis Chan Pui Yee
Best Drama	No Room For Crime
Best Actor	Owen Cheung - No Room For Crime
Best Actress	Katy Kung - Big Biz Duel
Best Supporting Actor	King Lam - No Room For Crime
Best Supporting Actress	Kelly Fu - No Room For Crime
Most Improved Actor	Nicholas Yuen - Call of Destiny
Most Improved Actress	Hera Chan - No Return
Best Theme Song	This home by Chantel Yiu - Come Home Love: Lo and Behold
TVB Male Newcomer	Aska Cheung Chi Ho
TVB Female Newcomer	Rachel Chan Yee Tak
Malaysia Most Favourite Variety and Documentary Program	Super Trio New Year Special 2025
Malaysia Most Favourite TVB Drama	Big Biz Duel
Malaysia Most Favourite TVB Actor	Owen Cheung - No Room For Crime
Malaysia Most Favourite TVB Actress	Kelly Cheung - Big Biz Duel
Best TVB Variety Program	Midlife, Sing & Shine! Season 2
Best TVB informatics Program	Scoop
TVB Professional Spirit Award	TVB Sports Team
TVB Lifetime Achievement award	Eric Chung Chi Kwong

== First line-up ==
These dramas air in Hong Kong every Sunday to Friday from 8:00 pm to 8:30 pm on Jade.

Remark: Starting on 31 July 2024 until 1 Aug 2024 from 7:30 pm to 8:00 pm due to the 2024 Summer Olympics.

Broadcast	English title (Chinese title)	Eps.	Cast and crew	Theme song(s)	Avg. rating	Genre	Ref.
(from 2023); 20 Feb 2017– 7 Aug 2026 (to 2025)	Come Home Love: Lo and Behold 愛·回家之開心速遞	2868	Sandy Shaw, Law Chun-ngok (producers); Ma Chun-ying, Lee Yi-wah, Yuen Bo-wai (writers); Lau Dan, Pal Sinn, Angela Tong, Koni Lui, Andrew Chan, Andrea So, Veronica Shiu, Joyce Tang, Kalok Chow, Law Lok-lam, Geoffrey Wong, Mark Ma, Ricco Ng, Hoffman Cheng, Mandy Lam, Kim Li	"Latin Soul Strut" "在心中" (Within the Heart) by Jacqueline Wong "開心速遞” (Happy courier) by 群星合唱 "愛心灌溉" (Filled with love) by Joey Wong (JW) "這個家" (This home) by Chantel Yiu	TBA	Sitcom, supernatural	

== Second line-up ==
These dramas air in Hong Kong from 8:30 pm to 9:30 pm, Monday to Friday on Jade.

Remark: Starting on 29 July 2024 until 9 Aug 2024, there will not be premiering on the drama series episode due to the premiere of 2024 Summer Olympics which will take place from 26 July 2024 to 11 Aug 2024.

Background shading indicates dramas not produced by TVB.

Broadcast	English title (Chinese title)	Eps.	Cast and crew	Theme song(s)	Avg. rating	Genre	Ref.
(from 2023); 25 Dec- 12 Jan	You're Just Not Her 妳不是她	15	Stephen Tsui, Chan Ping (producers); Mai Shi-Long (screenwriter); Jonathan Cheung, Karl Ting, Crystal Fung, Stephanie Che, Claire Yiu, Mark Ma Kwun Tung, Andrew Yuen Man-kit, Krysella Wong, Telford Wong, Tiffany Kwan, Rosita Kwok, KC Chun, Sophie Yip, William Chak, King Lam, Derek Wong, Joan Lee, Phoebe Pang	Officially Missing You (In English) by Aster Lau What A Wonderful World (In English) by Joey Thye Encountered (遇到了) by Ronny Lay	20.0	Fashion, romantic comedy	
15 Jan- 26 Jan	The Airport Diary 飛常日誌	10	Andy Chan (producer); Benny Wong (screenwriter); Kenneth Ma, Sisley Choi, Moses Chan, Samantha Ko, Tony Hung, Tsui Wing, Brian Chu, Tiffany Lau, Rosita Kwok, Joey Thye, Ricco Ng, Andrew Yuen Man-kit, Eileen Yeow, Thomas Sin, Junior Anderson, Frankie Choi, Derek Wong, David Do	Flying Diary (飛常日記) by Albert Chau	23.6	Modern, romantic comedy, drama	
29 Jan- 23 Feb	A Fallen Xian 本尊就位	20	Liang Yao-jiang (producer); Yip Sai Hong (writer); Brian Tse, Danny Hung, Erica Chan, Stephen Wong Ka-lok, Willie Wai, Bert Mok, Li Shing-cheong, Carisa Yan, Eva Lai	The deity is not me (本尊不是我) by Archie Sin	20.9	Period drama, action	
26 Feb- 29 Mar	In Bed With A Stranger 再見·枕邊人	25	Liu Chun Shek (producer); Lam Lai-Mei (writer); Joe Ma, Mandy Wong, Kelly Cheung, Kirby Lam, Nicole Wan, Aurora Li, Joey Law, Fred Cheng, KK Cheung, Shing Mak, Yen To Yin Gor, Jim Tang, Eric Cheng, Stephanie Au, Doris Chow, Amisha Ng, Iris Lam, Janice Pang, Gregory Lee, Henry Lo, Man Yeung, Cheng Chun Hei, William Chak, Sophie Yip	Same pillow (同枕) by Vivian Koo Goodbye pillow man (再見枕邊人) by Jinny Ng, Joey Law	20.0	Fashion, suspense, mystery, psychological thriller	
01 Apr- 10 May	Sinster Beings 2 逆天奇案2	30	Lau Gar Ho, Lister Chan (producers); Sham Kwok Wing, Sun Hao Hao (writers); Nelson Cheung (director); Ruco Chan, Alex Fong, Ben Wong, Jonathan Cheung, Matthew Ko, Rosina Lam, Joman Chiang, Crystal Fung, Rosita Kwok, Moon Lau, Osanna Chiu, Ling Mak, Gabriel Harrison, Fred Cheng, Gary Chan, Joseph Lee, Jackson Wan Kwong, Marx Cheung, Sabrina Leung, Ricky Lau, Kenneth Ma, Susan Tse, Pat Poon, Yen To Yin Gor, Vincent Lam Wai, Li Lung Kay, Eva Lai, Gigi Yim, Vinci Wong, Lisa Ch'ng, Iris Lam, Telford Wong, Frankie Choi, Michael Wai, Bond Chan, Jim Ping, Terence Tung, Sebastian Mok, Sheldon Lo, Albert Cheung, Geoffrey Albert Wong, David Chiang, Brian Tse, Hana Luk, Lisa Marie Tse, Cathy Wong, Carmen Ngai, Charlene Houghton, Moss Wu, King Lam, Steve Lee, Jim Tang	Counterattack (逆襲) by Albert Chau Regret for thousand years (後悔萬年) by Ruco Chan Missed · Re-realization (錯過·再實現) by Gigi Yim	23.9	Crime drama, action, mystery	
13 May- 21 Jun	The Heir to the Throne 家族榮耀之繼承者	30	Tse Ying, Tommy Leung (producers); Shu Chen (executive producer); Wong Kok Fai, Xiao Guanghan (writers); Charmaine Sheh, Raymond Lam, Him Law, Raymond Wong Ho-yin, Toby Leung, Jeannie Chan, Venus Wong, Candice Yu, Mimi Kung, Dada Chan, Betsy Cheung, Rainbow Ching, Kimmy Low, Lau Kong, Gallen Lo, Hui Shiu-hung, Hugo Ng, Wilfred Lau, Inez Leong Lok In, Macy Chan, Ai Wai, Joseph Yeung, Jovi Heng, Joey Leong, Cindy, Yuan Teng	Still Three Thousand of Us (愛在三千的宇宙) by Raymond Lam Erased timeline (已刪除的時間線) by Feanna Wong	25.5	Romantic drama, modern, family, epic	
24 Jun- 26 July	No Room For Crime 反黑英雄	25	Chung Shu Kai, Ben Fong (producers); Ng Lap Kwong, Fong Sai Keung (writers); Joel Chan, Owen Cheung, Benjamin Yuen, Elaine Yiu, Rebecca Zhu, Kelly Fu, Angel Chiang, Jacky Cai, Jonathan Cheung, Hugo Wong, King Lam Ching, Sky Chiu, Roxanne Ho, Aurora Li, Sophie Ngan, Lily Poon, Michelle Tsang, Elizabeth Wu, Aska Cheung, Joey Leung Chiu-yi, Terrence Huang, Leo Kwan, Alex Tse, Bond Chan, Adrien Yau, Alex Kwok, Eric Cheng, Willie Lau, Vincent Lam, Kevin Tong, Kris Lam, Kelvin Yuen, Eric Chung, William Chak, Steve Lee	The Crossroads by Hoffman Cheng The Break Of Dawn by Joey Wong Ho Yee (JW) Blank (空白) by Jinny Ng	24.3	Police tactical, crime drama	
12 Aug- 13 Sep	Forensic Heroes 6 Redemption 法證先鋒6 倖存者的救贖	24	Chung Shu Kai, Wong Kwok Fai, Tse Ying (producers); Ng Lap Kwong (screenwriter); Bosco Wong, Benjamin Yuen, Jacky Cai, Joman Chiang, Kelly Fu, Sisley Choi, Venus Wong, Joey Thye, Yvette Chan, Kelvin Kwan, James Ng, Hugo Wong, Mason Fung, Mark Ma, Niklas Lam, Elvina Kong, Mandy Yuen, Juliana Kwok, Osanna Chiu, Ball Mang, Angel Chiang, Bob Lam, Bond Chan, Lincoln Hui, Eddie Pang, Nicole Wan, Toby Chan, Eyvonne Lam, Man Yeung, Milkson Fong, Judy Kwong, King Lam	Survived (倖存) by Felix Lam Lost in the Night (In English) by Jacky Cai	25.6	Crime drama, mystery	
16 Sep- 18 Oct	Big Biz Duel 企業強人	25	Marco Law (producer); Benny Wong (writer); Moses Chan, Shaun Tam, Kelly Cheung, Katy Kung, David Chiang, Brian Tse, Stephanie Lee, Felix Ng, Li Shing-cheong, Daniel Chau, Ashley Chu, Anthony Ho, Willie Wai, Steve Lee, Sam Tsang, Eddie Pang, Man Ngai, Nicole Wan, Aurora Li, Jerry Leung, Terence Siu, Terence Tung, Jim Tang, Kelvin Liu, Lily Poon, Eric Cheng, Carisa Yan, Keith Ng	Flow all over the earth (流遍大地) by German Ku With you (在一起) by Vivian Koo Come With Me (In English) by Yumi Chung	23.2	Fashion, business, war	
21 Oct- 22 Nov	No Return 巾幗梟雄之懸崖	25	Dave Fong (producer); Cheung Wah-Biu (writer); Wayne Lai, Nancy Wu, Edwin Siu, Joey Law, Hera Chan, Lee Shing-cheong, Mary Hon, Yen To Yin Gor, Celina Harto, Susan Tse, Gabriel Harrison, Lisa Ch'ng, Akina Hong, Sam Tsang, Yuki Law, Carman Kwan, Kristy Shaw, Albert Cheung, Gordon Ip, Sunny Dai, Rosanne Lui, Eric Cheng, Pat Poon, King Kong Lam, Cheng Shu Fung	Even if the sky falls (就算天空塌下来) by Leo Ku Red butterfly (紅蝴蝶) by Nancy Wu, Wayne Lai	23.2	Period drama, romantic comedy	
25 Nov- 27 Dec	Call of Destiny 異空感應	25	Amy Wong (producer); Tak Kwong-dai (writer); Carlos Chan, Nicholas Yuen, Hera Chan, Zoie Tam, Chan Ka Fai, Mimi Kung, Janice Pang, Henry Lo, Candy Cheung, Anthony Ho, Amy Fan, William Hu, Timothy Cheng, Bond Chan, Lisa Ch'ng, Rosanne Lui, William Chak, Fei Wu, Kevin Tong, Ball Mang, Gary Tam, Janice Ting, Rocky Cheng, Moss Wu, Gordon Siu, Meini Cheung, Niklas Lam, Jim Tang, David Do, Kenneth Fok, Anthony Cheung, Chloe Law, Hanks Li Yuk Hang, Stefan Wong	Sensations (遇感) by Steven Suen The Vanished You (消失的你) by Windy Zhan	20.4	Fashion, crime thriller, drama, suspense	
30 Dec- 24 Jan (to 2025)	Battle Of Marriage 奔跑吧! 勇敢的女人們	20	Steffie Lai (producer); Lam Wai-cheng (screenwriter); Edwin Siu, Jinny Ng, Brian Chu, Winki Lai, Eric Tang, Eyvonne Lam, Anthony Ho, Kevin Tong, Rainbow Ching, Nicole Wan, Cheung Sze-yan, Verena Wong, Chun Kai-wai, Carman Kwan, English Tang, Timothy Ho, Wong Yat-ming, Nina Li, Kate Ng, Ball Mang	Can you be moved again? (再度能感動嗎) by Edwin Siu, Jinny Ng Have a good time or not? (好好過不好過) by Vivian Koo Finally come now (終於走到現在) by Felix Lam	20.4	Comedy, action, drama	

== Third line-up ==
These dramas air in Hong Kong from 9:30 pm to 10:30 pm, Monday to Friday on Jade.

Remark: Starting from 29 July 2024 until 9 Aug 2024, there will be not premiering on the drama series episode due to the premiere of the 2024 Summer Olympics, which will take place from 26 July 2024 to 11 Aug 2024.

Background shading indicates dramas not produced by TVB.
Background shading voice actor are produced by TVB.

Broadcast	English title (Chinese title)	Eps.	Cast and crew	Theme song(s)	Avg. rating	Genre	Ref.
(from 2023); 01 Jan- 26 Jan	The Spectator 旁觀者	20	Yip Chun Fai (producer); Choi Ting Ting, Fung Yat Chun (screenwriters); Pakho Chau, Venus Wong, Jinny Ng, Joey Law, Benjamin Yuen, Mark Ma Kwun Tung, Shiga Lin, Paisley Hu, Brian Tse, Daniel Chau, Irina Tang, Martin Lau, Jeremey Wong, Sophie Lam, Hoi Yeung, Joey Miu, Sam Tsang, Kelvin Yuen, Willie Wai, Shing Mak, David Do, Henry Lee, Hellston Ching, Janice Tang, Lucy Li, Amisha Ng, Kayan Choi, Doris Chow, Nicole Wan, Elizabeth Nicole Wu, Stephen Wong Ka-lok, Chun Kai-wai, Carlos Koo, Stephen Ho, Eric Cheng, June Ng, Carisa Yan, Sophie Yip, Samantha Chuk, Fanny Lee, Albert Cheung, Linus Ma, Eric Tang, Timothy Ho, Venus Tang, Fanny Ip, So Lai-ming, Rosita Kwok, Hero Yuen	Lonely Island (孤島) by Jinny Ng Save, commemorate, and remember fragments (保存·紀念·回憶片段) by Vivian Koo	17.6	Mystery, crime drama	
29 Jan- 22 Feb	Justice Sung Begins 狀王之王	18	Cheung Tat-ming, Lam Tze Chung (producers); Chenchen Han (writers); Vincent Wong, Elaine Yiu, Lam Chi-chung, Cheung Tat-ming, Benny Chan, Celina Harto, Dada Wong, King Kong Lee, Gabriel Harrison, Irina Tang, Jacquelin Ch'ng, Connie Man, Elizabeth Ji Ping, Kiwi Yuen, Jerry Ku, Dominic Ho, Keith Mok, Raymond Chiu, Eddie Pang, Ricky Wong, Oscar Li, Brian Chow Pak-yan, Ken Sung, Alex Choi Sheung-chun, Edward Chui, Billy Lau	To be honest, this pot is a bit of a masterpiece (講真呢鑊有啲傑) by Vincent Wong, Timothy Chan, Sean Wen, Duncan How, Zayden	17.6	Historical period drama, comedy, mystery	
26 Feb- 22 Mar	Happily Ever After? 婚後事	20	Lincoln Lam (producer); Wong Bing-Yee (writer); Him Law, Lai Lok-yi, Joey Law, Yoyo Chen, Venus Wong, Winki Lai, Toby Chan, Elizabeth Nicole Wu, Purple Ng, Stephanie Au, Eva Lai, Lo Koon Lan, Fanny Lee, Eric Tang, Willie Lau, Vincent Choi, Leo Kwan, Shaopin, Alvin Tam, William Hu, Andrew Yuen Man-kit, Aurora Li, Blossom Chan, Kevin Tong, William Chak, Danny Hung	The Fallen City (傾城) by Mike Tsang Gulf Of Alaska (阿拉斯加海灣) In Mandarin By Vivian Koo	19.1	Romantic comedy, modern	
25 Mar- 3 May	Story of Kunning Palace 命轉皇后	30	Chu Yui-Pan (director); Ren Zhuang, Yan Moyi (screenwriters); Bai Lu, Zhang Linghe, Wang Xingyue, Jacky Zhou, Sally Liu, Elisa Ye, Eddie Cheung, Melody Tang, Yvonne Yung, Michelle Hu, Xingyu Lu, Otto Chan, Desmond Tan	My world (我的天下) by Janess Wong It's doomed (一早註定) by Rock Ho	16.5	Historical period drama, wuxia, time travel, romance	
6 May- 31 May	Broken Trust 神耆小子	20	Simon Wong (producer); Lam Lai-Mei (writer); Kent Cheng, Edwin Siu, Raymond Cho, Archie Sin, Kyle Lee, Amy Fan, Kelly Fu, Yuki Law, Isabella Hsu, Chan Wing Chun, Leo Kwan, Frankie Choi, Vincent Cheung, Nicole Wan, Jenny Wong, Lisa Ch'ng, Christine Chu, Roxanne Ho, Doris Chow, Jacquelin Ch'ng, Rachel Wong, Kinlas Chan, Felix Ng, Man Ngai, Jim Tang, Henry Lo, David Do, Jerry Leung, Kiwi Yuen, Chole Nguyen, Bambi Lok, Terrance Siu, Tom Lo	Head of family (一家之主) by Jackson Wan-kwong I wish you a long life (但願人長久) by Edwin Siu It's rare to have a lover (難得有情人) by Archie Sin & Yuki Law Sweet (甜蜜蜜) by Amy Fan	20.4	Fashion, comedy	
03 Jun- 12 July	Blossoms Shanghai 繁花	30	Wong Kar-wai (director); Qin Wen (screenwriter); Hu Ge, Ma Yili, Tiffany Tang, Xin Zhilei, You Benchang, Jennifer Du, Jonny Chen, Yu En Tai, Ryan Zheng, Huang Jue, Wu Yue, Papi Jiang, Chloe Maayan, Naomi Wang, Sun Qiang, Yang Hao Yu, Chen Guan Ning, Entai Yu, Tong Chen, Fan Tiantian, Dai Jun, Yi Zhao Bo, Cheng Liang, Zhang Jianya, Rui Chen, Cao Yi, Xu Yu Lan, Xie Cheng Ying, Tang Chang, Yan Xiao Pin, Kan Wang, Lu Zhong, Dong Yong, Kenichi Miura, Yan Feng, Zhang Ge, Shen Xiao Hai, Yuan Wenkang, Kelly Lin, Deric Wan, Evergreen Mak Cheung-ching, Kenny Bee, Yumiko Cheng, Isabelle Huang, Zhi-Hua Zhang, Xiaojun Zong, Qian Yi, Jin Shan, Mei Ni Sha, Zhang Lu, Feng Yi Zhe	Akai Giwaku (赤的疑惑) By Icely Cheung Night Wind (夜风中) By Kerryta Chau Yat Sang Ho Kau (一生何求) & Looking Back (再回首) By Mike Tsang	19.0	Period drama, trade war, emotion, romance	
15 July- 26 July	Serengeti 森林女王	10	Ng Kwong Wah (producer); Chan Ching-yee (writer); Kenneth Ma, Samantha Ko, Venus Wong, Matthew Ho, Hera Chan, Regina Ho, Rosita Kwok, Mimi Kung, Eric Tang, Shaun Tam, Joel Chan, Mark Ma, Danny Hung, Roxanne Ho, Joey Miu, Ruth Tsang		18.0	Dramatised natural history, documents	
12 Aug- 20 Sep	The Legend of Heroes 射鵰英雄傳之鐵血丹心	30	Yang Lei, Deng Ke, Wen De Guang, Cao Dun (directors); Liu Ming Li (producer); Ivy Bao, J Black Ci Sha, Wang Hong Yi, Huang Yi, Peter Ho, Ming Dao, Hankiz Omar, Zhou Yi Wei, Gao Weiguang, Calvin Yu, Chen Duling, Zoey Meng Ziyi, He Yu, Wendy Luo, Betty Crystal Huang, Prince Liu Zhi Yang, Jin Rong Li, Una You, Tan Li Min, Jiusheng Wang, Ye Zuxin, Zhao Zheng, Zhang Zhi Hao, Sylvia Li Jin Jin, Wang Bo Qing, Lei Tian, Yan Jie, Li Wang, Zhao Jian, Yan An, Dexi Liu, Zhao Zi Qi, Fan Jing Yi, Guo Jin Ye, William Wu, Hou Chuan Gao, Tian Tai Zhong, Wang Yi Sheng, Zhang Junming, Ji Chen Mu, Wang Yu	Iron Heart (鐵血丹心) by Janees Wong & FC Tam Fai-chi Thousands of sorrows remembering old love (千愁記舊情) by FC Tam Fai-chi Four machines (四張機) by Janees Wong	19.1	Historical period drama, wuxia	
23 Sep- 18 Oct	The Tale of Rose 玫瑰的故事	20	Wang Jun (director); Li Xiao, Wang Si (writers); Chen Yin-fei (executive producer); Crystal Liu, Sebrina Chen, David Tong, Regina Wan, Kenny Lin, Wallace Huo, Peng Guanying, Huang Yi, Zhu Zhu, Wu Bi, Wang Ming-yang, Xia Lixin, Yu Hui, Yan Qing, Zhang Fan, Wan Guo-peng, Wang Zi Wei, Fang Liu, Lan Yingying, Liu Jun, Gao Shu-guang, Qiu Xinzhi, Jiang Xueming, Lin Yi, Peng Guanying, Yufang Wu, Hou Changrong, Zhang Yue, Ao Lei, Ling Yun, Yuri Khlystov	Evidence of growth (成長的證據) by Jinny Ng	19.0	Romance film, drama, slice of life	
21 Oct- 25 Oct	ICAC Investigators 2024 廉政行動2024	5	Catherine Tsang, Lo Heung Lan (producers); Ricky Ko, Ho Pong Mak, Ng Ban Yu (directors); He Liang-yu, Ryan Wai, Lam Hui-laan (writers); Joel Chan, Kelly Cheung, Him Law, Kent Cheng, Tsui Wing, Fred Cheng, Joey Law, Alex Yung, Nicholas Yuen, Candy Cheung, Jacky Cai, Yvette Chan, Iris Lam, Brian Tse, Willie Wai, Daniel Chau, Lincoln Hui, Kevin Tong, Ronny Lay, Gabriel Harrison, Milkson Fong, Jeremy Wong, Uki Law, Wong Kin Fung, Stephen Ho, Mason Fung, Aeren Man, Linna Huynh, Ken Sung, King Kong Lam, Issac Chung, Benjamin Yuen, Eva Lai, Rainbow Ching, Frankie Choi, Bert Mok, Eddie Li-kong, Chun Kai-wai	ICAC Investigators Theme	21.4	Police procedural	
28 Oct- 3 Dec	Darkside of the Moon 黑色月光	25	Kwan Man Shum (producer); Quan Xiang-Lan, Chung Shu Kai (directors); Leung Man Wa, Lui Sau Lin (screenwriters); Tavia Yeung, Priscilla Wong, Rosina Lam, Vincent Wong, Mat Yeung, Jonathan Cheung, Edward Ma, Kwok Fung, Vincent Wan, Matthew Ho, Griselda Yeung, Candy Cheung, Mark Ma, Kris Lam, Eric Cheng, Henry Lo, Helen Ng, Cecilia Fong, Paisley Hu, Cathy Wong, Jessica Liu, Stephanie Au, Sophie Yip, Alex Kwok, Joey Leung, Oscar Tao, Joan Lee, Stephen Ho, Ethan Lam King Ching, Axity Chong, Hugo Wong, Derek Wong, Andrea So, Eva Lai, Willie Lau, Joman Chiang, Michelle Tsang, Rachel Lam, Sheldon Lo, Vincent Choi, Man Yeung, Pinky Cheung, Strawberry Yeung Yuk-mui, Irina Tang, David Do, Alex Tse, Miguel Choi, Jerry Leung, Chun Kai-wai, Li Shing-cheong, Ronny Lay, Eddie Pang, Wong Kin Fung, Andy Lau Tin-ling, Carlos Koo, Kenneth Fok, Paul Gare, Man Ngai	Dark Moon (黯月) In Mandarin By Joey Thye Moon (月亮) Theme Song	20.3	Fashion, modern, suspense	
04 Dec- 03 Jan (to 2025)	Heroes 说英雄谁是英雄	22	Fang Fang (producer); Li Mu Ge (director); Shuang Cheng (screenwriter); Joseph Zeng, Yang Chaoyue, Liu Yuning, Baron River Chan, Meng Ziyi, Kris Sun Zujun, Zeng Yi-Xuan, Fan Zhen, Feng Shao, Gallen Lo	Legend of Heroes (英雄傳奇) by Zayden Pang, Duncan How, Timothy Chan, Vivian Kong, Desta Li	15	Historical period drama, wuxia	

== Notes ==
- The Spectator 旁觀者; Released Premieres By September 6, 2023 On Youku, And TVB Anywhere Then Later Released By January 1, 2024 On Jade. Copyright Notice: 2021
