= List of TVB dramas in 2022 =

This is a list of television serial dramas released by TVB in 2022, including highest-rated television dramas and award ceremonies.

== Top ten drama series in ratings ==
The following is a list of TVB's top serial dramas in 2022 by viewership ratings. The recorded ratings include premiere week, final week, finale episode, and the average overall count of live Hong Kong viewers (in millions).

Highest-rated drama series of 2022
Rank	English title	Chinese title	Average	Peak	Premiere week	Final week	Series finale	HK viewers (millions)
1	Get On A Flat	下流上車族	27.3					
2	Forensic Heroes V	法證先鋒V	23.7					
3	Your Highness	痞子殿下	22.8					
4	Big White Duel 2	白色強人II	22.5					
5	Used Good	異搜店	22.3					
6	The Righteous Fists	鐵拳英雄	21.7					
7	Flying Tiger 3	飛虎之壯志英雄	21.5					
8	Freedom Memories	青春不要臉	20.45					
9	Communion	回歸	19.2					
10	Against Darkness	黯夜守護者	18.9					

== Awards ==
Category/Organization	TVB Anniversary Awards 08 Jan 2023
Best Drama	Get On A Flat
Best Drama (Malaysia)	I've Got the Power
Best Actor	Joel Chan
Best Actor (Malaysia)	Ruco Chan
Best Actress	Elena Kong
Best Actress (Malaysia)	Moon Lau
Best Supporting Actor	Eric Tang
Best Supporting Actress	Angel Chiang
Most Improved Actor	Ricco Ng
Most Improved Actress	Rosita Kwok
Best Variety Program	Super Trio Returns
Best Theme Song	Wish by Joey Wong
Most Popular On-Screen Couple or Partnership	Kalok Chow; Jeannie Chan; Joey Wong; Brian Chu; Jonathan Cheung
Most Popular Male Character	Kalok Chow
Most Popular Female Character	Amy Fan Yik Man

== First line-up ==
These dramas air in Hong Kong every Monday to Sunday from 8:00 pm to 8:30 pm on Jade.

Broadcast	English title (Chinese title)	Eps.	Cast and crew	Theme song(s)	Avg. rating	Genre	Ref.
(from 2021); 20 Feb 2017– 7 Aug 2026 (to 2023)	Come Home Love: Lo and Behold 愛·回家之開心速遞	2868	Sandy Shaw, Law Chun-ngok (producers); Ma Chun-ying, Lee Yi-wah, Yuen Bo-wai (writers); Lau Dan, Pal Sinn, Angela Tong, Koni Lui, Andrew Chan, Andrea So, Veronica Shiu, Joyce Tang, Kalok Chow, Law Lok-lam, Geoffrey Wong, Mark Ma, Ricco Ng, Hoffman Cheng, Mandy Lam, Kim Li	"Latin Soul Strut" "在心中" (Within the Heart) by Jacqueline Wong "開心速遞" (Happy courier) by 群星合唱 "愛心灌溉" (Filled with love) by Joey Wong (JW)	TBA	Sitcom, Supernatural	

== Second line-up ==
These dramas air in Hong Kong from 8:30 pm to 9:30 pm, Monday to Friday on Jade.

Background shading indicates dramas not produced by TVB.

Broadcast	English title (Chinese title)	Eps.	Cast and crew	Theme song(s)	Avg. rating	Genre	Ref.
(from 2021); 20 Dec- 14 Jan	Used Good 異搜店	20	Liang Yao-Jiang (producer); Cheung Shi-Cheong (writer); Matthew Ho, James Ng, Hera Chan, Eyvonne Lam, Raymond Cho, Shing Mak, Li Shing-cheong, Strawberry Yeung, Lai Yin Shan, Eric Cheng, John Chan, Amy Fan, Aurora Li	How time flies (光陰飛逝時) by Jinny Ng	22.3	Mystery, Paranormal, Thriller	
17 Jan- 05 Feb	Freedom Memories 青春不要臉	15	Poon Ka Tak, Lincoln Lam Hang (producers); Steffie Lai (writer); Dickson Yu, Karl Ting, Tiffany Lau, Joey Thye, Kelly Ng, Niklas Lam, Kayan Yau, Danny Hung, Alex Tse, Sunny Dia, Li Shing-cheong, Elvina Kong	Freedom Memories (青春不要臉) by Archie Sin, Aska Cheung, Hugo Wong, Venus Lam, Windy Zhan, Yumi Chung Rebuild (自我處理) by Joey Thye	20.45	Comedy, Action, Drama	
07 Feb- 18 Mar	Modern Dynasty 家族榮耀	30	Tommy Leung (producer); Wong Guo-fai (writer); Suk Yin Choi (screenwriter); Julian Cheung, Him Law, Raymond Wong Ho-yin, Tavia Yeung, Rain Li, Toby Leung, Candice Yu, Lynn Dai, Manna Chan, Derek Kok, Henry Yu, Gallen Lo, Ai Wai, Jackson Lau, Joseph Yeung, Betty Mak, Bessie Chan, Hillary Lau, Kevin Chu, Karen Lee	Diverging Paths (分岔路) by Joyce Cheng We Grew This Way (我們都是這樣長大的) by Van Chen	24.7	Romantic drama, Modern, Family	
21 Mar- 15 Apr	The Imperial Coroner 機智女法醫	20	Lou Jian (director); Qing Xian Ya Tou, Qian Xiao Bai (screenwriters); Bai Yi Cong, Li Er Yun (producers); Han Zhi Jie (executive producer); Su Xiao Tong, Wang Zi Qi, Zhao Yao Ke, Yang Ting Dong	路再荒你在旁 (Always with me) by Shiga Lin	22.98	Wuxia, Historical period drama	
18 Apr- 13 May	Story of Zom-B 食腦喪B	20	Ng Koon Yu (producer); Sin Chui Ching, Kwan Chung-ling (writers); Matthew Ho, Kaman Kong, Iris Lam, Ram Chiang, Ashley Chu, Hera Chan, Suet Nay, Stephanie Che, Arnold Kwok, Milkson Fong, Jackson Lai, Mark Ma Kwun Tung	大志 (The High Aim) by Deep Ng (opening version) & Matthew Ho, Arnold Kwok, and Mikson Fong (Ending credits version)	16.5	Comedy, Horror, Supernatural	
16 May- 30 Jun	Royal Feast 尚食	34	Yu Zheng (producer); Wang Wei, Bai Yun Mo (directors); Zhou Mo (screenwriter); Xu Kai, Wu Jinyan, Wang Yizhe, Wang Churan, Zhang Nan, He Rui Xian, He Feng Tian, Wang Yan, Liu Min, Zhang Zhixi, Yu Rongguang, Hong Jian Tao, Wang Dong, Wang Yu, Lian Lian, Zhu Zhi Ling, Zhang Yi Xi, Ma Meng Wei, Cheng Li Sha, Han Shuai, Xuan Yi Hao, Deng Sha, Zeng Yi Xuan, Yi Yong, Chen Ruo Xi, Xi Wang, Gan Wei, Gao Yang, Xu Bai Hui, Joy Sheng, Wang Rui Zi, Kang Qun Zhi, Zhang Zheng Yang, Wang Zhi Gang, Nina Wang, Ma Xiao Qian, An An, Dong Hui, Jiang Yuan Ya Rong, Liu Lu, Jiang Feng, Ming Peng, Zhang Gong, Fan Zhen, Yi Yong Ming, Sun Di, He Qiang, Wen Yu, Xu Rong Zhen, Huang Xin Yao, Liu Si Bo	五味回憶 (Taste of Memories) by Jinny Ng & 爱情许可证 (Love License) by Windy Zhan	18.8	Wuxia, Historical period drama, Romance	
4 July- 8 July	My Pride 我的驕傲 & Touch In The Sky 究竟天有幾高 & You Light Me Up 神奇的燈泡 & My Mom Ping Pong 母親的乒乓球 & Silver Lining 曙光	5	Jazz Boon, Lam Chi-wah, Marco Law, Joe Chan, Andy Chan (producers); Ng Lap-kwong, Benny Wong, Shing Mo-ching, Sin Chui Ching (writers); Ruco Chan, Joel Chan, Matthew Ho, John Chiang, Lau Dan, Brian Chu, Mark Ma Kwun Tung, Kalok Chow, Natalie Tong, Katy Kung, Yoyo Chen, Kaman Kong, Hera Chan, Tiffany Lau, Judy Kwong, Carisa Yan, Edith Au, Strawberry Yeung, Jason Piao, Li Shing-cheong, Bowie Wu, Law Lok Lam, Man Yeung, Timothy Cheng, Sunny Dia, Chan Wing Chun, Stephanie Lee, Venus Tang, Liz Ji Ping Ping		15.9	Fashion, Romance, Family Drama	
11 July- 29 July	Communion 回歸	15	Lam Chi Wah (producer); Cheung Sei-cheong (writer); Roger Kwok, Alice Chan, Matthew Ho, Hera Chan, Kalok Chow, Tsui Wing, Ricco Ng, Liza Wang, Shek Sau, Law Lan, Joey Thye, Kayan Yau, Erica Chan, Niklas Lam, Felix Lam, Strawberry Lam	一水兩方 (One Water Two Ways) by Gigi Yim	19.2	Fashion, Historical, Drama	
01 Aug- 02 Sep	Your Highness 痞子殿下	25	Andy Chan (producer); Cheung Sei-cheong, Kwan Chung-ling (writers); Jeannie Chan, Kalok Chow, Joey Wong, Brian Chu, Jonathan Cheung, Hugo Ng, Raymond Cho, Willie Wai, Helen Ma, Mayanne Mak, May Chan	我就是主角 (I Am the Protagonist) by Kalok Chow & 花不起溫暖 (Can't Give No More) by Joey Wong (JW)	22.8	Historical period drama, Comedy	
05 Sep- 14 Oct	A Dream Of Splendor 梦华录	30	Yang Yang (director); Zhang Wei (screenwriter); Fang Fang, Qi Shuai, Wang Yu Ren, Yan Li Yan, Sun Zhong (producer); Huang Wei (costume designer); Crystal Liu, Chen Xiao, Ada Liu, Jelly Lin, Xu Haiqiao, Dai Xu, Gao Chang Yuan, Zhang Xiaoqian, Guan Yun Peng, Wang Luoyong, Bao Jianfeng, Anlian Yao, Yajin Liu, Liu Wei, Daisy Li, Jinjie Guo, Zhang Xiang, Sun Zu Jun, Yin Zhu Sheng, Du Yu Ming, Lu Yong, Hu Yu Xuan, Liu Ke Jun, Jia Nai, Li Sheng Jia, Su Yu Jie, Marco Chen, Rachel Yu, Zhu Hui, Marco Chang, Cao Ming Hua, Claire Jia, Na Gwang Hoon, Bi Han Wen, Han Yuan Qi, Guo Zi Ming, Cao Zan, Liao Wang, Yao Wei Ping, Cheng Guo Dong, Chen Xu Ming, Yi Yong Ding, Zhou Xiaohai, Sheng Zi Hang, Zhang Bo Hao, Qin Yue, Shen Xue Wei, Ru Tian, Hu Xi Fan, Guo Peng, Zhou Jie, Li Shuai, Zhang Li Qiu, Howie Huang, Simon Sun, Zhang Da Bao, Sean Han, Feng Li Ping, Mera Jin, Fang Xiao Mo, Shi Qing Hu	I'm just like I used to be (我就像從前) by Hana Kuk Start from tomorrow (明天開始) by Sherman Poon	20.3	Historical period drama, Romance	
17 Oct- 11 Nov	Get On A Flat 下流上車族	20	Kwan Man Sum (producer); Yi Mui Fung, Leong Man-wah (writers); Paw-Hee-ching, Elena Kong, Andrew Lam Man-chung, Andrew Yuen Man-kit, Rosita Kwok, Yuki Law, Bella Lam, Karl Ting, Eric Tang, Leo Kwan, Heidi Chu, King Ching-lam, Derek Wong, Kitterick Yiu	In the family (一家人) by Andrew Lam & Aeren Man Companion (上車伴侶) by Rock Ho	27.3	Drama, Family	
14 Nov- 23 Dec	Forensic Heroes V 法證先鋒V	30	Ben Fong (producer); Yin Tin Shing, Siu Ling Sin (writers); Mok Chi-kai (filmwriter); Wong Kwok Fai (choreographer); Lau Ka-hui (line producer); Bosco Wong, Jacky Cai, Benjamin Yuen, Tony Hung, Venus Wong, Sisley Choi, Kandy Wong, Kelly Fu, Shiga Lin, Fred Cheng, Jason Lau Piao, Telford Wong, Matthew Ho, Karl Ting, Hera Chan, Strawberry Lam, Erica Chan, Coco Chiang, KK Cheung, Brian Tse, Kelvin Kwan, Vincent Lam Wai, David Do, Anthony Ho, Stephen Ho, Enson Lau, Snow Suen, Wiyona Yeung, Lincoln Hui	Faultless (天不會錯) by Fred Cheng Never again (再也不見) by Vivian Koo; Maybe (或者 In English) by Venus Wong; Say goodbye to yesterday (道別昨天) by Bosco Wong	23.7	Crime drama, Mystery	
26 Dec- 20 Jan (to 2023)	A Perfect Man 有種好男人	20	Liang Yao-Jiang (producer); Sin Chui Ching, Fung Yat Chun (writers); Joe Ma, Ali Lee, Yoyo Chen, Tsui Wing, Ricco Ng, Candice Chiu, Raymond Cho, Jack Wu, Griselda Yeung, Nicole Wan, KK Cheung, Penny Chan	Good Man (好男人) by Shiga Lin	22.6	Romantic comedy, Modern	

== Third line-up ==
These dramas air in Hong Kong from 9:30 pm to 10:30 pm, Monday to Friday on Jade

Broadcast	English title (Chinese title)	Eps.	Cast and crew	Theme song(s)	Avg. rating	Genre	Ref.
(from 2021); 27 Dec- 7 Jan	Hello Missfortune 愛上我的衰神	10	Dave Fong (producer); Sandy Osan (choreographer); Hubert Wu, Erica Chan, Mark Ma Kwun Tung, Mayanne Mak, Law Lan, C.Kwan, Timothy Cheng, Susan Tse, Lincoln Hui, Vivian Koo, June Ng, Willie Lau, Eddie Li, Doris Chow, Chiu Lok Yin, Irina Tang, Au Ming Miu, Alvin Ng	Never knew (太多不知道) by Hubert Wu With you (我要和你在一起) by Vivian Koo	16.8	Fantasy, Love Comedy, Drama	
10 Jan- 19 Feb	The Righteous Fists 鐵拳英雄	30	Jazz Boon (producer); Yip Tin Shing, Wong Bing-yee, Ng Lap-kwong (writer); Leung En-dong (screenwriter); Ruco Chan, Philip Ng, Joel Chan, Natalie Tong, Elaine Yiu, Grace Wong, Moon Lau, Tiffany Lau, Yuen Qiu, Dada Wong, Kirby Lam, Mary Hon, KK Cheung, Jimmy Au, Vincent Lam, Hoffman Cheng, Pierre Ngo, Carlo Ng, Man Yeung, Derek Wong, Eileen Yeow, Jade Leung, Suet Nay, Lily Leung, Kelvin Lee, Jackson Lai, Oscar Li, Milkson Fong, Terrance Huang, William Chak, Auston Lam, Sunny Dia, Leo Tsang, Lok Yan Ming, Chole Nguyen, Sophie Yip, Aurora Li, Jarryd Tam, Keith Mok, Doris Chow, June Ng, Burmie Wong, Alex Tse, Bert Mok, Ricky Wong, Julian Yik Yu Hong, Sunny Dia, Sophie Lam, Bert Mok, Joseph Yeung, Ball Meng, Niki Chan, Leo Kwan, David Do	Same way (同路) by Ruco Chan Immortal (天荒不老) by Hana Kuk	21.7	Action, Wuxia, Period drama	
21 Feb- 01 Apr	Flying Tiger 3 飛虎之壯志英雄	30	Virginia Lok, Cha Chuen Yee, Raymond Lee (producers); Ng Lap-kwong (writer); Michael Miu, Eddie Cheung, Joe Ma, Bosco Wong, Ron Ng, Moses Chan, Michael Wong, Roger Kwok, Edwin Siu, Oscar Leung, Tsui Wing, To Yin Gor, Candy Cheung, Alice Chan, Rebecca Zhu, Jacky Cai, Jeannie Chan, Sisley Choi, Elaine Yiu, Coco Chiang, Winki Lai, Kelly Fu, Akina Hong, Hugo Wong, Kalok Chow, Timothy Cheng, Telford Wong, Ricco Ng, Arnold Kwok, Karl Ting, William Chak, Patrick Lam, Joey Law, Daniel Chau, Kayan Choi, Andrew Yuen Man-kit, Pat Poon, Law Lok-lam, Gregory Charles Rivers, Chris Collins, Jai Day, Charlene Houghton, Philippe Joly, Carl Ng, Sheldon Lo, William Hu, Stefan Wong, Strawberry Yeung, Wong Wai Tong, Gary Tam, Man Yeung, Eric Chung, Matthew Ko, Hiroki Wong, Wiyona Yeung, Angel Chiang, Carat Cheung, Kelly Ng, Ng Sherring, Kong Wing Fai, Julian Yik Yu Hong, Graeme John Still, Liviu Covalschi, Mike Powers, Mike Leeder, Ines Laimins, Peter Chan, Adrian Chau, Constance Kong, Nadege Beland, Wang Zhi Fei, Sebastian Mok	Double you (兩個你) by G.E.M.	21.5	Police Tactical, Crime drama	
04 Apr- 29 Apr	Barrack O'Karma 1968 金宵大廈2	20	Yip Chun-Fai (producer); Ruby Law Pui-ching (writer); Li Wen-shun (screenwriter); Selena Li, Joel Chan, Christine Ng, Hubert Wu, Bob Cheung, Jazz Lam, Candice Chiu, Roxanne Tong, Shiga Lin, Karl Ting, Timothy Cheng, Willie Wai, Geoffrey Wong, Randal Tsang, Chloe So, Amy Fan, Sophia Lam, Chelffy Yau, Kelly Ng, Debbie Lo, Lam King Ching, Arnold Kwok, Henry Yu, Jason Lau, Alvis Lo, Enson Lau, Eric Tang, Derek Wong, Penny Chan, Forest Chan, Sophia Lam, Chiu Chung Yu, Aurora Li, Chloe Nguyen, Christine Chu, William Liu, Thomas Ng, Carlo Ng, Jimmy Au, Curtis Ho, Franchesca Wong, Fion Yung, Alice Fung, Brian Tse, Lau Kong, Cheng Chun Hei	Stand By Me (伴我左右) by Joey Wong (JW) Eternally loving (相愛萬年) by Selena Li Stand by Your Side by Fred Cheng Goodbye (今宵多珍重) by Kayee Tam (Cantonese) and Vivian Koo (Mandarin)	17.4	Mystery, Drama, Paranormal	
2 May- 27 May	Stranger Anniversary 雙生陌生人	25	Lam Chi-wah (producer); Lam Lai-mei (writer); Cheung Chung-tai (screenwriter); Joe Ma, Alice Chan, Roxanne Tong, Angel Chiang, Matthew Ho, Winki Lai, Lesley Chiang, Rosita Kwok, Tsui Wing, John Chiang, Jason Lau Piao, Griselda Yeung, Kelly Gu, Janice Pang, Carmen Ngai, Yuki Law, Telford Wong, Kelvin Leung, Geoffrey Wong, Sonya Chan, Lena Li, Toby Chan, Rachel Wong, Linna Huynh, Deborah Poon, Alice Fung, William Chu, Derek Alan James Mackesy, Alan Tam Kwan Lun, William Chak, Kelvin Yuen, Niklas Lam, Choi Kwok Hing, David Do, Tyson Chak	Identify Exchange (身份對調) by Rock Ho & Steven Suen Say Again Yes I Do (再說我願意) by Windy Zhan	13.5	Modern drama, Comedy, Fashion Urban Fantasy	(Note: The episode count was originally 25 episodes, but due to low viewership ratings, TVB cut and shorten the series by five episodes.)
30 May- 24 Jun	Brutally Young 2.0 十八年後的終極告白2.0	20	Simon Wong (producer); Lai Kar-ming (writer); Lim Chong Pang (screenwriter); Shaun Tam, Joel Chan, Raymond Cho, Katy Kung, Zoie Tam, Candice Chiu, Nicole Wan, Joseph Lee, David Do, Frankie Choi, Stephen Ho, Jerry Leung, Gordon Siu, Amber Tang, Chole Nguyen, Amisha Ng, Blossom Chan, Venus Tang, Rachel Wong, Kitty Lau, Wong Wai Tong, Terence Siu, Andy Lau, Keith Shing	Behind The Hue (色彩背面) by Aska Cheung	15.6	Mystery, Thriller, Paranormal, Crime drama	
27 Jun- 22 July	Childhood In A Capsule 童時愛上你	20	Liu Chun Shek (producer); Lo Mei-wan, Tong Kin-ping (writers); Samantha Ko, Owen Cheung, Ruco Chan, Kandy Wong, Griselda Yeung, Nicole Wan, Andrew Yuen Man-kit, Bowie Wu, Carlo Ng, Man Yeung, Chan Wing Chun, Leo Kwan, Man Ngai, Derek Wong, Aurora Li	Find you forever (一生找到你) by Steven Suen, Sherman Poon	14.6	Modern, Romantic, Melodrama	
25 July- 2 Sep	Big White Duel 2 白色強人II	30	Marco Law (producer); Wong Wai-keung (writer); Roger Kwok, Kenneth Ma, Natalie Tong, Kelly Cheung, Nancy Wu, Moses Chan, Ram Chiang, Max Cheung, John Chan, Willie Wai, Lesley Chiang, Doris Chow, Rainbow Ching, Virginia Lau. Gary Tam, Patrick Lam, Osanna Chiu, Aurora Li, Lily Poon, Wiyona Yeung, Amy Ng, Fei Wu, Alex Yung, Kelvin Yuen, Rosita Kwok, Venus Tang, Wong Fei, Shaopin Tsui, Kitterick Yiu, John Chiang, Matthew Ko, Sheldon Lo, Elizabeth Wu, GoGo Cheung, Mary Hon	Wish (希望) [In English] by Joey Wong (JW) Big White Duel II (上流一族) opening theme by Alan Cheung & Schumann Lee	22.5	Medical drama	
05 Sep- 30 Sep	Against Darkness 黯夜守護者	20	Stephen Tsui, Ng Koon Yu (producers); Shing Mo-ching (writer); Philip Cheng (screenwriter); Alice Chan, Ruco Chan, Sharon Chan, Kaman Kong, Brian Tse, Andrew Yuen Man-kit, Stephanie Che, Joseph Lee, Li Shing-cheong, Leo Kwan, Jimmy Au, Raphael Wong, Willie Lau, Penny Chan, Milkson Fong, Ken Law, Hoi Bok-yeung, Paisley Hu, Au Ming Miu, Kanice Lau, Andy Wong, Eric Cheng, Martin Lau, Arthur Sy, Blossom Chan, Yuki Law, Amisha Ng, Chun Kai Wai, Helen Seng, Athena Ng, Tiffany Choi, Tania Chan	Take a gentle turn (輕輕一轉) by Brian Tse Darkness to the night opening theme by Damon Chui	18.9	Crime drama, Fashion, Action, Police Tactial	
03 Oct- 28 Oct	The Beauty of War 美麗戰場	20	Patrick Kong (producer, writer, screenwriter & choreographer); Choi Ka-kit (line producer); Jeannie Chan, Moon Lau, Hera Chan, Angel Chiang, Rebecca Zhu, Joey Wong, Natalie Tong, Joel Chan, Alex Fong, Aska Cheung, Karl Ting, Patrick Dunn, To Yin Gor, John Chiang, Griselda Yeung, Ling Mak, Regina Ho, Snow Suen, Candy Cheung, Bob Lam, William Chak, Li Shing-cheong, Anthony Ho, Sunny Dia, KK Cheung, Carlo Ng, Shing Mak, Akai Lee, Kelvin Yuen, Frederick Chui, Mina Kwok, Fanny Lee, Kayan Lau, Rosita Kwok, Chole Nguyen, Nicole Wan, Aurora Li, Kayan Choi, Wong Fei, Milkson Fong, Telford Wong, Marktwo Lee, Amy Fan, Stephen Ho, Derek Wong, Gary Chan, Henry Lo, Leo Tsang, Tyson Chak, Ally Tse, Jeffrey Lai, Curtis Ho, Mavis Wong, Luisa Leitao, Thomas Sin, Oman Lam, Heidi Chu, Arnold Kwok, Carmen Kwan	Can't wait for you (沒法等你) by Aska Cheung Beautiful Battleground (美麗戰場) theme intro song by JW	22.8	Fashion, Romantic comedy, Modern, Melodrama	
31 Oct- 02 Dec	I've Got The Power 超能使者	25	Jazz Boon (producer); Leung En-dong, Lo Mei-wan (writers); Philip Cheng (screenwriter); Ruco Chan, Natalie Tong, Joel Chan, Sammy Sum, Grace Wong, Tiffany Lau, Moon Lau, Jazz Lam, Rainbow Ching, May Chan, Sophie Yip, Griselda Yeung, Meini Cheung, Jimmy Au, KK Cheung, Carlo Ng, Telford Wong, Kelly Ng, Alice Fung, Arnold Kwok, Joe Yau, Man Yeung, Terence Tung, Kelvin Yuen, Penny Chan, Henry Lo, Kevin Tong, Junior Anderson, Hellston Ching, Fanny Lee, Deborah Poon, Katherine Ho, Chiu Lok Yin, Blossom Chan, Lisa Ching, Keith Mok, Cecilia So, Carisa Yan, Sophie Lam, Steve Lee, Willie Lau, Jack Hui, Vincent Lam Wai, Alex Tse, Eric Chung	The able (能者) by Fred Cheng Unrepentant determination (不悔的決心) by Hana Luk	18.2	Action, Supernatural, Drama	
05 Dec- 06 Jan (to 2023)	Go With The Float 輕·功	25	Wong Wai Sing (producer); Loong Man Hong (writer); Ho Yi-zing (line producer); Mimi Kung, Wayne Lai, Joman Chiang, Rebecca Zhu, Fred Cheng, Brian Chu, Timothy Cheng, Willie Wai, Griselda Yeung, Baby Bo, Alice Wong, Mary Hon, Jessica Kan, Yen To Yin Gor, Leo Kwan, Jimmy Au, Arnold Kwok, Iris Lam, Wong Yee Kam, Wong Wai Tong, Alan Chui, Daniel Chau, Edith Au	Slightly Release (輕輕放開) by Fred Cheng	20.4	Fashion, Family Drama	

== Weekend dramas ==
These dramas air in Hong Kong from 8:30pm to 9:30pm, Sunday on Jade. Starting on 1 May 2022 until 29 May 2022, these dramas air in Hong Kong from 10:00pm to 11:00pm, Sunday on Jade.

Broadcast	English title (Chinese title)	Eps.	Cast and crew	Theme song(s)	Avg. rating	Genre	Notes	Official website
(from 2021); 05 Dec- 13 Feb	Forever Young at Heart 青春本我	10	Erica Li (producer); Yu-Fong Peng (director); Gigi Yim, Chantel Yiu, Windy Zhan, Yumi Chung, Aeren Man, Sherman Poon, Kaitlyn Lam, Venus Lam, Lolita Tsoi, Aska Cheung, Archie Sin, Rock Ho, Eden Lau, Lee Siu-kin, Felix Lam, Steven Suen, Hugo Wong, Joey Wong, James Ng, Brian Chu, Andy Lin, Shing Maverick Mak, Wong Cho-lam, Jinny Ng, Tania Chan, Patrick Dunn, Strawberry Yeung, Philip Keung, Alice Chan, Angela Tong, Chin Ka-lok	Forever young at heart (青春本我) theme song by Rock Ho, Archie Sin	14.8	School Campus, Music and dance, Youth Psychology		
1 May- 29 May	ICAC Investigators 2022 廉政行動2022	5	Dante Lam, Catherine Tsang (producers); Benjamin Yuen, Sisley Choi, Shaun Tam, Sharon Chan, Hera Chan, Daniel Chau, Jocelyn Chan, Zoie Tam, Brian Tse, Jack Wu, Claire Yiu, Raphael Wong, Carlo Ng, Timothy Cheng	ICAC Investigators Theme	11.9	Police procedural		

== Notes ==
- Story Of Zom-B 食腦喪B; Copyright notice: 2021.
- Stranger Anniversary 雙生陌生人; Copyright notice: 2022.
