= List of TVB dramas in 2023 =

This is a list of television serial dramas released by TVB in 2023, including highest-rated television dramas and award ceremonies.

== Top ten drama series in ratings ==
The following is a list of TVB's top serial dramas in 2023 by viewership ratings. The recorded ratings include premiere week, final week, finale episode, and the average overall count of live Hong Kong viewers (in millions).

Highest-rated drama series of 2023
Rank	English title	Chinese title	Average	Peak	Premiere week	Final week	Series finale	HK viewers (millions)
1	The Invisibles	隱形戰隊	25.5					
2	The Queen of News	新聞女王	25.2					
3	Treasure Of Destiny	新四十二章	23.0					
4	A Perfect Man	有種好男人	22.6					
5	Secret Door	隱門	22.3					
6	Mission Run	廉政狙擊	22.2					
7	Night Beauties	一舞傾城	21.7					
8	Narcotics Heroes	破毒強人	21.55					
9	Speaker Of Law	法言人	20.4					
10	The Golden Bowl	黃金萬両	20.2					

== Awards ==
Category/Organization	TVB Anniversary Awards 14 Jan 2024
Best Drama	The Queen of News
Best Actor	Moses Chan (Narcotic Heroes)
Best Actress	Charmaine Sheh (The Queen of News)
Best Supporting Actor	Jazz Lam (The Invisibles)
Best Supporting Actress	Samantha Ko (The Queen of News)
Most Improved Actor	Mark Ma Kwun Tung
Most Improved Actress	Tiffany Lau
TVB Newcomers with Best Potential	Gigi Yim, Kayan Yau, Kelly Gu Pui Ling, Archie Sin Ching Fung, Yumi Chung Yau Mei
Best Theme Song	'Crystal Clear' by Gigi Yim (The Queen of News)
Best Dressed Female Artist on Red Carpet	Charmaine Sheh
Best Dressed Male Artist on Red Carpet	Kenneth Ma
Best TVB Male Host	Jarvis Chow
Best TVB Female Host	Mayanne Mak Mei Yan
TVB Lifetime Achievement Honorary Award	Keith Yuen Chi Wai
Malaysia Most Favourite TVB Drama	The Invisibles
Malaysia Most Favourite TVB Actor	Kenneth Ma (The Queen of News)
Malaysia Most Favourite TVB Actress	Charmaine Sheh (The Queen of News)
Malaysia Most Favourite Variety and Documentary Program	Lokyi in the Wild
Best TVB Variety Program	Midlife, Sing & Shine!
Best TVB informatics Program	No Poverty Land III - A Vast Expanse
TVB Greater Bay Area Most Favourite Variety and Documentary Program	Super Trio Series
TVB Greater Bay Area Most Favourite Drama	The Queen of News
TVB Greater Bay Area Most Favourite Actor	Bosco Wong (Dead Ringer)
TVB Greater Bay Area Most Favourite Actress	Charmaine Sheh (The Queen of News)
TVB Professional Spirit Award	Cast of Scoop

== First line-up ==
These dramas air in Hong Kong every Monday to Sunday from 8:00 pm to 8:30 pm on Jade. Remark: Starting on 20 Nov 2023, these dramas air in Hong Kong every Sunday to Friday from 8:00 pm to 8:30 pm on Jade.

Broadcast	English title (Chinese title)	Eps.	Cast and crew	Theme song(s)	Avg. rating	Genre	Ref.
(from 2022); 20 Feb 2017– 7 Aug 2026 (to 2024) present	Come Home Love: Lo and Behold 愛·回家之開心速遞	2868	Sandy Shaw, Law Chun-ngok (producers); Ma Chun-ying, Lee Yi-wah, Yuen Bo-wai (writers); Lau Dan, Pal Sinn, Angela Tong, Koni Lui, Andrew Chan, Andrea So, Veronica Shiu, Joyce Tang, Kalok Chow, Law Lok-lam, Geoffrey Wong, Mark Ma, Ricco Ng, Hoffman Cheng, Mandy Lam, Kim Li	"Latin Soul Strut" "在心中" (Within the Heart) by Jacqueline Wong "開心速遞" (Happy courier) by 群星合唱 "愛心灌溉" (Filled with love) by Joey Wong (JW)	TBA	Sitcom, Supernatural	

== Second line-up ==
These dramas air in Hong Kong from 8:30 pm to 9:30 pm, Monday to Friday on Jade.
Remark: Starting on 21 Jan 2023 through 28 Jan 2023 from 8:30 pm to 9:30 pm on Jade.

Background shading indicates dramas not produced by TVB.

Broadcast	English title (Chinese title)	Eps.	Cast and crew	Theme song(s)	Avg. rating	Genre	Ref.
(from 2022); 26 Dec- 20 Jan	A Perfect Man 有種好男人	20	Liang Yao-Jiang (producer); Sin Chui Ching, Fung Yat Chun (writers); Joe Ma, Ali Lee, Yoyo Chen, Tsui Wing, Ricco Ng, Candice Chiu, Raymond Cho, Jack Wu, Griselda Yeung, Nicole Wan, KK Cheung, Penny Chan	Good man (好男人) by Shiga Lin	22.6	Romantic comedy, Modern	
21 Jan- 28 Jan	The Golden Bowl 黃金萬両	8	Ng Koon Yu (producer); Sin Chui Ching (writer); Nancy Sit, Raymond Cho, Mayanne Mak, Ashley Chu, Hugo Wong, Mark Ma, Kaman Kong, Tsui Wing, Chole Nguyen, Eyvonne Lam, Lena Li, Tiffany Choi, Sharlene Wong, Sandy To, Deborah Poon, Eden Lau, Andy Lau	A ton of gold (黃金萬両) by Nancy Sit, Kaman Kong, Raymond Cho, Hugo Wong, Ashley Chu, Mayanne Mak, Mark Ma	20.2	Historical period drama, Romance, Comedy	
30 Jan- 02 Mar	Treasure Of Destiny 新四十二章	24	Joe Chan (producer); Cheng Shing Mo (writer); Moses Chan, Katy Kung, Kalok Chow, Kaman Kong, Zoie Tam, Kandy Wong, Helen Ma, Mary Hon, Judy Kwong, Felix Ng, Timothy Cheng, Sunny Dia, Lam King Ching, Aurora Li, Fanny Ip, Alice Fung So-bor, Yen To Yin Gor, Julian Yik Yu Hong, Terrence Huang	The Treasure Is In The Place (寶藏在原地) by Fred Cheng I'm So Lonely (原來寂寞得多) by Windy Zhan	23.0	Fashion, Costume, Comedy, Fantasy	
06 Mar- 14 Apr	The Invisibles 隱形戰隊	30	Jazz Boon (producer); Lam Lai-mei, Leung Yan-Tung (writers); Kenneth Ma, Ruco Chan, Joel Chan, Jazz Lam, Natalie Tong, Moon Lau, Tiffany Lau, Elena Kong, Amy Fan, Jack Wu, Jimmy Au, KK Cheung, Hugo Wong, Carlo Ng, Arnold Kwok, Candice Chiu, Iris Lam, Kelly Ng	Invisible Flame (隱形火) by Aska Cheung They aren't you (他不是你) by Shiga Lin There is no reason to leave (離場沒有理由) by James Ng	25.5	Police Tactical, Crime drama	
17 Apr- 26 May	New Life Begins 卿卿日常	30	Liu Wen Yang (producer); Zhao Qi Chen (director); Wang Xiao Hui (executive producer); Bai Jingting, Vivian Tian, Chen Bao Guo, Li Su, Xiaoyun Chen, Liu Guanlin, Ling Zi Liu, Edward Zhang, Chang Long, Fan Shuai Qi, Liu Mengmeng, Gao Shuguang, Liu Meihan, Melody Tang	Bubble cucumber (氣泡青瓜) by Chantel Yiu & Aska Cheung Get the courage to be happy (得到快樂的勇氣) by Windy Zhan	17.03	Historical period drama, Romance, Wuxia	
29 May- 30 Jun	Secret Door 隱門	25	Amy Wong (producer); Yung Sin-ying (writer); Ruco Chan, Hugo Ng, Mandy Wong, Roxanne Tong, Moon Lau, Nicholas Yuen, Mary Hon, Angelina Lo, Rainbow Ching, Chloe Nguyen, KK Cheung, To Yin Gor, Henry Lo, Hugo Wong, David Do, Gary Tam	Dark room (暗房) by Ruco Chan & Vivian Koo	22.3	Crime drama, Action, Police, Mystery, Psychological thriller	
03 July- 28 July	Unchained Medley 靈戲逼人	20	Simon Wong (producer); Tan Cui-Shan (writer); Owen Cheung, Katy Kung, Tiffany Lau, Nicolas Yuen, Rainky Wai, Felix Ng, Li Shing-cheong, Elvina Kong, Susan Tse, Henry Lo, Mandy Yuen, Don Li	Something between us (和你有些) by Alvin Ng It's like wandering around (似夢迷離) by Owen Cheung & Sherman Poon Platinum lift (白金升降機) by Windy Zhan	19.3	Romantic comedy, Mystery	
31 July- 08 Sep	Narcotics Heroes 破毒強人	30	Marco Law (producer); Benny Wong (writer); Moses Chan, Nancy Wu, Edwin Siu, Kelly Cheung, Matthew Ho, Rosita Kwok, Bowie Cheung, Ashley Chu, Ram Chiang, Raymond Cho, Kenneth Ma, Steve Lee, Penny Chan, Mark Ma Kwun Tung, Stephen Ho	Fury (怒火) by James Ng City fog (城市迷霧) by Vivian Koo	21.55	Crime drama, Police	
11 Sep- 13 Oct	Let Me Take Your Pulse 你好, 我的大夫	25	Dave Fong (producer); Steffie Lai (writer); Chan Bo-yan (screenwriter); Sisley Choi, Matthew Ho, Erica Chan, Ricco Ng, Kayan Kau, Danny Hung, Lincoln Hui, Susan Tse, Angelina Lo, To Yin Gor, Albert Cheung, Li Shing-cheong, Brian Tse, Strawberry Yeung, Sam Tsang, David Do, Eva Lai Yin Shan	Never say goodbye (不會道別) by Vivian Koo	19.26	Love, Medical drama	
16 Oct- 17 Nov	Romeo And His Butterfly Lover 羅密歐與祝英台	25	Joe Chan (producer); Cheng Shing Mo (writer); Aimee Chan, Moses Chan, Kalok Chow, Kayan Yau, Joman Chiang, Elena Kong, Tsui Wing, Timothy Cheng, Felix Ng, Judy Kwong, Helen Ma, Curtis Ho	Life and death (忘生記死) by Windy Zhan Hopeless (原來無明天) by Joey Wong (JW)	17.86	Nostalgic, Fantasy, Action	
20 Nov- 22 Dec	The Queen of News 新聞女王	26	Chung Shu Kai, Kwan Man Shum (producers); Charmaine Sheh, Selena Lee, Kenneth Ma, Samantha Ko, Venus Wong, Regina Ho, Mimi Kung, Stephanie Che, Sharon Chan, Joel Chan, Shaun Tam, Eric Tang, Matthew Ho, Mat Yeung, Matthew Ko, Niklas Lam, Mark Ma Kwun Tung, Jonathan Cheung, Roxanne Ho, Hera Chan, Celina Harto, Carmen Ngai, Rosita Kwok, Elizabeth Nicole Wu, Eva Lai, Joseph Lee, Vincent Lam, Eric Cheng, Telford Wong, Lincoln Hui, Frankie Choi, Danny Hung, James Ng	Crystal Clear (In English) by Gigi Yim Peaceful Midnight (In English) by Quinn Lui	25.2	Workplace drama	
25 Dec- 12 Jan (to 2024)	You're Just Not Her 妳不是她	15	Stephen Tsui, Chan Ping (producers); Mai Shi-Long (screenwriter); Jonathan Cheung, Karl Ting, Crystal Fung, Stephanie Che, Claire Yiu, Mark Ma Kwun Tung, Andrew Yuen Man-kit, Krysella Wong, Telford Wong, Tiffany Kwan, Rosita Kwok, KC Chun, Sophie Yip, William Chak, King Lam, Derek Wong, Joan Lee, Phoebe Pang	Officially Missing You (In English) by Aster Lau What A Wonderful World (In English) by Joey Thye Encountered (遇到了) by Ronny Lay	20.0	Fashion, romantic comedy	

== Third line-up ==
These dramas air in Hong Kong from 9:30 pm to 10:30 pm, Monday to Friday on Jade

Background shading indicates dramas not produced by TVB.

Broadcast	English title (Chinese title)	Eps.	Cast and crew	Theme song(s)	Avg. rating	Genre	Ref.
(from 2022); 05 Dec- 06 Jan	Go With The Float 輕·功	25	Wong Wai Sing (producer); Loong Man Hong (writer); Ho Yi-zing (line producer); Mimi Kung, Wayne Lai, Joman Chiang, Rebecca Zhu, Fred Cheng, Brian Chu, Timothy Cheng, Willie Wai, Griselda Yeung, Baby Bo, Alice Wong, Mary Hon, Jessica Kan, Yen To Yin Gor, Leo Kwan, Jimmy Au, Arnold Kwok, Iris Lam, Wong Yee Kam, Wong Wai Tong, Alan Chui, Daniel Chau, Edith Au	Slightly Release (輕輕放開) by Fred Cheng	20.4	Fashion, Family Drama	
09 Jan- 17 Feb	Side Story of Fox Volant 飛狐外傳	30	Lian Yi-ming (director); Bai Yi-cong (screenwriter); Jin Yong (creator); Jane Zhao (producer); Gong Yu Han (casting director); Qin Junjie, Liang Jie, Xing Fei, Ray Lui, Peter Ho, Lin Yushen, Maggie Huang, Leanne Liu, Yvonne Yung, Zhao Yingzi, Chen Zhihui, Li Xiyuan, Hai Ling, Hei Zi, Liu Yu Feng, Ye Xiangming, Zhou Xiao Ou, Henry Han Shuai, Wang Hui Chun, Lian Yi Ming, Xiao Dai Qing, He Zi Ming, Fang Xiao Li, Zhang Zi Hao, Chunzhong Zhang, Kou Shan Wen, Zhaoqi Shi, Ding Qiao, Guan Chang, Lei Zhang, Li Haoxuan, Nicholas Wang, Lawrence Shi, Ding Zhiyong, Hong Siyang, Dong Yan, Zhao Xin, Liu Feng Shuo, Ma Xiaoqian, Jie Yan, Jingjing Zhang, Xu Zhe, Ma Xue Lei, Zhao Haiying, Peng Jiang, Wu Shulin, Yang Chao Ran, Yichen Wang, Yan Jin Feng, Xi Man-ning, Hailong Chen, Wu Xin Zun, Xu Zhan Wei, Chao Zhi Qian	Snowy Mountain Flying Fox (雪山飛狐) by David Lui & Kayee Tam; Separate from love (若離於愛) by Vivian Koo	19.4	Historical period drama, Wuxia, Fantasy	
20 Feb- 25 Mar	Mission Run 廉政狙擊	27	Virginia Lok, Wong Kwok Keung, Tse Wing (executive producers); Cat Kwan Ho-Yuet (writer); Bosco Wong, Ron Ng, Vincent Wong, Ben Wong, Shaun Tam, Ruco Chan, Rosina Lam, Mandy Wong, Sisley Choi, Nancy Wu, Kelly Fu, Jacky Cai, Joey Thye, Celina Harto, Toby Chan, Candy Lo, Eva Lai Yin-shan, Elaine Ho, Jim Ping Hei, Derek Kok, Alex Fong, Brian Tse, Jonathan Cheung, Hugo Wong, Matthew Ko, Raymond Cho, William Hu, Jason Lau Piao, Pat Poon, Moss Wu, Nicole Wan, Jan Tse, Albert Cheung, Sam Tsang, Alan Chui, David Do, King Ching Lam, Parkman Raphael Wong, Penny Chan, Antonio Ng, Fei Wu, Ricky Wong, Danny Hung, Alvin Ng, Enson Lau, Jeffrey Lai, Gary Tam, Jerry Leung, Andrew Chan, Kayan Choi, Kitty Lai, Cayley Mak, Cecilia Fong, Edith Au, Carlos Koo, Derek Alan James Mackesy, Frankie Choi, Eric Cheng, Wing Fai, Julian Yik, Eric Tang, Henry Lo, Stefan Wong, Louis Szeto Fai, Frank Michael Liu, Amber Tang, KC Wu Ka Chun, Lena Li, Fanny Lee, Yi Yingtong, John Au, Chun Wai, Carson Wong, Kelvin Yuen	Friendship and empathy (友共情) by James Ng & Hubert Wu	22.2	ICAC, Crime drama, Action	
27 Mar- 7 Apr	Forensic JD 女法醫JD	10	Ricky Wong (director); Mani Fok, Lau Ming-lai (producers); Charlene Choi, Gillian Chung, Joseph Chang, Carlos Chan, Jeana Ho, Kenny Kwan, Law Kar-ying, Henry Prince Mak, Gladys Li, Michael Tao, Kenny Wong, Paw Hee-ching, Power Chan, Alan Luk, Deno Cheung, Kwok Fung, Evergreen Mak, Debbie Ng, Alan Yue, Angus Yeung, Carson Bill Lee-man, Bing Tong, Rachel Leung, Ashina Kwok, Gigi Cheung, Elly Lam, Rabbit Chan	Perfect Strangers (In English) by Angela Hui Two-faces (雙面人) by Gillian Chung	17.0	Crime drama, Mystery	
10 Apr- 12 May	Speaker Of Law 法言人	25	Lau Gar Ho, Lister Chan (producers); Nelson Cheung (choreographer); Yi Mui Fung, Leong Man-wah (writers); Kenneth Ma, Jonathan Cheung, Rosina Lam, Joman Chiang, Stephen Wong Ka-lok, Regina Ho, Yuki Law, Sky Chiu, Enson Lau, Liam Fung, Karl Ting, Gabriel Harrison, Li Lung Kay, Susan Tse, Mimi Kung, Jason Lau Piao, Pat Poon, Li Shing-cheong, Bond Chan, KK Cheung, Max Cheung, Alex Yung, Stefan Wong, Osanna Chiu, Angelina Lo, Candy Cheung, Jacquelin Ch'ng, Wiyona Yeung, Hubert Wu, Bowie Wu, Ruco Chan, Moon Lau, Law Lan, Ling Mak, David Do, Joey Law, Akina Hong, Eva Lai, William Chak, Nicole Wu, Yvette Chan, Maggie Wong, Alice Fung, Oman Lam, Chan Wing Chun, Chiu Lok-yin, Ricky Wong, Kitterick Yiu, Linus Ma, Wong Fei, William Chu, Purple Ng, Derek Wong, Aurora Li, Frankie Choi, Terence Tung, Derek Alan James Mackesy, Grace Chi Ching, Rachel Lam, Man Yeung, Yen To Yin Gor, Kelvin Liu, Jacky Lee, Godwin Luk, Tiffany Kwan, Chloe Leung, Jim Tang, Leo Tsang, Onitsuka Ng Kin-chung, Alvin Ng, Arnold Kwok, Michael Wai, Lincoln Hui, Martin Lau, Julian Yiu, Clevis Tam, Kinlas Chan, Gordon Siu, Carlos Koo, Marktwo Lee, Danny Hung, Carina Leung, KC Chun, Janice Pang, Karen Wu, Julianna Ng, Cathy Wong, Chan Min-leung, Wong Chi-wing	Turning Point (轉捩點) by Hacken Lee The proposition of love (戀愛這命題) by Gigi Yim Friendship Years (友情歲月) by Kenneth Ma, Rosina Lam, Jonathan Cheung, Stephen Wong Ka-lok	20.4	Legal drama	
15 May- 13 Jun	Night Beauties 一舞傾城	22	Bill Chung Siu-hung (producer); Wong Jing, Li Zi-cong (writers); Jackie Ma Hok-Ming, Du Qiao (line producers); Monica Chan, Jacky Cai, Elaine Yiu, Kelly Fu, Connie Man, Judy Kwong, Yvette Chan, Wylie Chiu, Jacquelin Ching, Lisa Ching, Moss Wu, Kiwi Yuen, Sophie Ngan, Matthew Ko, Dominic Ho, Michael Tong, Mat Yeung, Kelvin Kwan, Raymond Chiu, Oscar Li, Ricky Wong, Ho Chun-hin, Parkman Wong, Samuel Leung, Cheung Pak-man, Yeung Lun, Chael Li, Chan Yi-di, Keith Mok, Cheng Shu-fung, Andy Lee Diy-yue, Philip Ling, Esta Shen Pu-jia, Rose Qin, Vin Choi, King Kong Lam	Talk about love (談情說愛) by Sally Yeh & Sammi Cheng Midnight beauty (午夜麗人) by Alan Tam Vulnerable woman (容易受傷的女人) by Faye Wong The heart is still cold (心仍是冷) by Anita Mui Days of walking together (一起走過的日子) by Andy Lau The world will become beautiful (世界會變得很美) by The Grasshopper	21.7	Fashion, Romantic comedy, Modern, Melodrama, Crime drama	
14 Jun- 28 Jul	Demi-Gods and Semi-Devils 天龍八部	33	Yu Rongguang (director); Zhang Meng, Sun Zhong Huai (producers); Jin Yong (creator); Yuan Zi Dan (screenwriter); Tony Yang, Bai Shu, Zhang Tianyang, Janice Man, Su Qing, Viva He Hong Shan, Liu Meitong, Yali Sun, Yu Rongguang, Ray Lui, Raquel Xu, Rain Lau, Ma Yashu, Crystal Huang, Terry Chiu, Shen Xiaohai, Zeng Yi-Xuan, Yuen Cheung-yan, Xiaoyu Zhu, Zhang Wan Er, Su Qian-wei, Gao Taiyu	Thousands of rivers and thousands of mountains (萬水千山縱橫) by Stacey Long & Angus Ting Two forget about the smoke (兩忘煙水裡) by Miranda Lee & Ramon Lo	19.5	Historical period drama, Wuxia	
31 Jul- 25 Aug	My Pet My Angel 寵愛Pet Pet	20	Andy Chan (producer); Lai Ka-ming (writer); Chung Yuek-si (screenwriter); Rosina Lam, Kalok Chow, David Chiang, Tsui Wing, Hugo Wong, Toby Chan, Kelly Gu, Andrew Yuen Man-kit, Man Yeung, Edsel Chiu, Sandy Leung, Fanny Ip, Roxanne Ho, Clementine Sze, Frankie Choi, Bert Mok, Thomas Sin, Hero Yuen, Eyvonne Lam, Katerina Leung, Rainbow Ching, Jeannie Chan, Eileen Yeow, KC Chun, Eric Cheng, Tony Yee, Cheung Sze-yan, Athena Ng, Stephanie Lee, Nicole Wan, Aurora Li, Terence Tung, Gordon Siu, Akai Lee, Ball Meng, Leah Siu, Tony Chui, Bert Mok, Kenneth Fok, Marco Lee, Ivan Siu, Anthony Yu, Peter Chan, Jess Sin, Harriet Lai, Cinda Hui, Kitty Lau, Mikako Leung, Vincent Choi, Miguel Choi, Jimmy Au, Mary Hon	Pampering (寵寵) by Yumi Chung Because of you (因为有你) by Rosina Lam	19.0	Fashion, Romantic comedy	
28 Aug- 06 Oct	Destined 长风渡	30	Yin Tao (director); Rao Jun, Bai Jin Jin (screenwriters); Mo Shu Bai (creator); Song Yi, Bai Jingting, Zhao Ziqi, Liu Xueyi, Haowei Zhang, Ray Chang, Sha Yi, Mickey He, Hu Ke, Zhang Yan-yan, Zhang Shao Gang, He Zhong Hua, Zhang Cheng He, Cheng Zi, Vina Zhang, Li Xin Ze, Zhao Huan Ran, Zhao Yuanyuan, Kai Deng, Dai Yi, Nie Zi Hao, Ai Mi, Li Xiao Pang, Terry Kuo hao-jun, Xiao Tian Ren, Xuan Yi Hao, Wei Yi, Zhang Ting Fei, Yan Jie, Ma Jing Han, Marco Leng Hai-ming, He Yong Sheng, Wang Gang, Zhang Gong, Yu Xiao Ming, Tian Miao, Shi Yu, Hu Jian, Ren Xue Hai, Zhao Yan Song, Jiang Zhen Hao, Ji Xiao Feng, Wang Peng Xiao, Xu Rong Zhen, Shen Baoping, Li Xiao Hong, Liu Xiu, Wang Shi Yu, Wang Jian Long, Yu Qing, Banson Shao-lin, Zhong Ming, Wei-wei, Mei Ling Zhen, Shao Si-han, Dora Lin Meng-qi, Dong Xin Yun, Zhang Lei, Tong Yi Lang, Zhang Bin, Yu Cheng Qun, Wu Shu Lin, Min Zheng, Wu Mian, Zhang Xi Lin, Alan Wang Ce Zhi-gang, Jin Kai Jie, Kong Lin, Ruizi Wang, Liu Xiening, Jiusheng Wang, Ding Yongdai	Holding a hundred years (抱著百年) by Felix Lam & Pamela Chiu There is snow along the road (沿路是飄雪) by Vivian Koo	20.1	Historical period drama, Wuxia	
09 Oct- 03 Nov	From Hong Kong To Beijing 香港人在北京	20	Chung Shu Kai, Wong Kwok Fai (producers); Chan Kiu Ying (writer); Tong Yiu-leung (screenwriter); Ruco Chan, Tony Hung, Edmond Leung, James Ng, Jinny Ng, Joey Thye, Jacky Cai, Kelly Fu, Yvette Chan, Moss Wu, Wong Fei, Phoebe Dan, Regina Ho, Irina Tang, Kiwi Yuen, Evergreen Mak Cheung-ching, Marco Lo, Eddie Pang, Vincent Lam, Eric Chung, Dean Li, Cola Yao, Shi Nan	Sing to your heart's content (盡情唱) by Ruco Chan, James Ng, Jinny Ng, Joey Thye I want to say goodbye to you properly, I'm afraid it's too late (想跟你好好道別我怕來不及) by James Ng, Joey Thye	18.0	Comedy, Fashion, Modern	
06 Nov- 07 Dec	Dead Ringer 疊影狙擊	24	Li Man-shun (director); Tommy Leung (producer); Chrissie Chau, Bosco Wong, Raymond Wong Ho-yin, Derek Kok, Eddie Kwan, Jason Wu, Eric Li, Kevin Chu, Alex Fong, Henry Yu, Chun Wong, Annie Man, Toby Leung, Angie Cheong, Amy Lo, Bessie Chan, Stephanie Cheng, Evelyn Choi, Kiki Cheung, Eric Cheng, Deon Cheung, Bond Chan, Oscar Chan, Ai Wai, Carlos Koo, Max Cheung, Jones Lee, K Wing-lung, Gregory Charles Rivers, Brian Thomas Burrell, Philippe Joly, Ronny Lay, Owen Ng, Joseph Yeung, Ding Yue, Martin Tong, Jerry Leung, Jacky Yeung, Keith Mok, Vincent Choi, Jeannie Lam, Pearl Poon, Hillary Lau, Anita Kwan, Kelvin Poon, Scott Choi, So Wai Chuen, Russell Cheung	A thousand years are like a day (千年如一日) by Feanna Wong	21.0	Fashion, Modern, Crime drama, Police	
08 Dec- 29 Dec (to 2024)	A League of Nobleman 君子盟	15	Chen Kuo Fu (producer); Yang Fan, Jia Xiao Xiong (director); Su Ming, Li Lin, Pei Li, Li Qiong, Hua Qian Ci (screenwriter); Jing Boran, Song Weilong, Guo Cheng, Hong Yao, Duo Wang, Shawn Zhang, Yueling Shi, Chuang Chen, Tongjiang Hou, Xiaojun Zong, Yunzhao Yang, Wang Jianguo, Li Taiyan, Ren Luomin, Jampa Tseten, Wang Xuan, Du Xiujun, Bozhan Ju, Yiren Sun, Zhang Tian Qi, Sun Yi Fan, Kai Shen	Unknown exploration (未知探索) by Felix Lam	18.0	Historical period drama, wuxia	
