= The Call of Destiny =

The Call of Destiny may refer to:

- The Call of Destiny (1922 film), a German silent film
- The Call of Destiny (1953 film), a French comedy drama film
- Call of Destiny, a 2024 Hong Kong television series
