= The Silver Chamber of Sorrows =

- 銀樓金粉
- Genre: Costume Drama
- Written by: Lau Choi Wan; Law Chung Yiu
- Starring: Nancy Sit; Paul Chun; Rebecca Chan; Christine Ng; Nancy Wu; Ng Wai Kwok
- Opening theme: "認命" by Ivana Wong
- Country of origin: Hong Kong
- Original language: Cantonese
- No. of episodes: 21

Production
- Producer: Terry Tong
- Running time: 45 minutes (approx.)

Original release
- Network: TVB
- Release: April 28 – May 23, 2008

The Silver Chamber of Sorrows (Traditional Chinese: 銀樓金粉) is a TVB period drama series broadcast in April 2008. It stars Nancy Sit, Paul Chun, Rebecca Chan, Christine Ng, Nancy Wu and Ng Wai Kwok.

== Synopsis ==
A rich family is ruled by lust
A hymn is mourned over by feuds

Sheung's Silver Chamber, the largest jewel company in Foshan, Guangdong, is facing serious financial difficulties. In order to obtain a loan from Shum’s family, Sheung Hang (Paul Chun), owner of the Chamber, together with his primary wife, Choi Siu-Tip (Nancy Sit), plot to arrange marriage between Sheung Wan (Ng Wai Kwok), Hang’s younger brother, and Shum Wing-Tung (Winnie Young), daughter of Shum’s family. Fueled by hatred, Ching Sau-Hang (Christine Ng), Wan’s lover, marries Hang and ironically becomes Wan’s sister-in-law. Wan falls out with Hang, and opts to live abroad and disconnects from his family.

After leaving home for years, Wan does not return home until the occasion to celebrate his father’s birthday. Unfortunately on the night before the occasion, Sheung Shai Jo, the only son of Hang, steals his grandfather's present for his greed and as a result causes his grandfather to agitate and pass away while his mother pushed the blame to Hang, Wan and Sau-Hang. As a result, all the evil deeds and secrets of the family are revealed one by one as the dark age of the family approaches...

== Cast ==
Cast	Role	Description
Kong Hon (江漢)	Sheung Joi San 尚在山	Sheung Heng, Sheung Wan's father
Paul Chun	Sheung Heng 尚鏗	Sheung Wan's older brother Tsoi Siu Dip, Lin Nin Wong, Cheng Sau Hang and Ha Fei Fei's husband Sheung Ho Yi, Sheung Shai Jo and Chau Kok's father Main Villain
Nancy Sit	Tsoi Siu Dip 賽小蝶	Sheung Hang's wife Sheung Ho Yi's mother Semi-villain
Rebecca Chan	Lin Nin Wong 連年旺	Sheung Hang's wife Sheung Shai Jo's mother Villain
Christine Ng	Cheng Sau Hang 程秀杏	Sheung Hang's wife Sheung Wan's ex-girlfriend Main Villain
Nancy Wu	Ha Fei Fei 夏霏霏	Sheung Hang's wife Sham Sung Hei's lover Villain
Charmaine Li	Sheung Ho Yi 尚可怡	Sheung Hang and Tsoi Siu Dip's daughter Sheung Shai Jo's half sister
Mat Yeung (揚 明)	Sheung Shai Jo 尚世祖	Sheung Hang and Lin Nin Wong's son Sheung Ho Yi's half brother
Ng Wai Kwok (伍衛國)	Sheung Wan 尚 鋆	Sheung Hang's younger brother Sham Wing Tung's husband Ching Sau Hang's ex-boyfriend
Winnie Yeung (楊婉儀)	Sham Wing Tung 沈詠彤	Sheung Wan's wife Sham Sung Hei's older sister
Jack Wu	Chau Chi Shing 周至誠	Chau Kok's husband
Shirley Yeung	Chau Kok 秋菊	Cheng Sau Hang's servant Sheung Hang's daughter Sheung Ho Yi and Sheung Shai Jo's half sister Chau Chi Shing's wife
Eric Li (李天翔)	Sham Sung Hei 沈崇熙	Sham Wing Tung's younger brother Ha Fei Fei's lover

== Viewership ratings ==
	Week	Episode	Average Points	Peaking Points	References
1	April 28 - May 2, 2008	1 — 5	29	33	
2	May 5–9, 2008	6 — 10	29	33	
3	May 12–16, 2008	11 — 15	31	36	
4	May 19–23, 2008	16 — 21	34	40	

== Awards and nominations ==
41st TVB Anniversary Awards (2008)

Nominations

- "Best Drama"
- "Best Actress in a Leading Role" (Nancy Sit - Choi Siu-Dip)
- "Best Actress in a Supporting Role" (Nancy Wu - Ha Fei-Fei)
- "My Favourite Female Character" (Christine Ng - Ching Sau-Hang)
