= Nancy Wu =

Hong Kong actor-singer (born 1981)

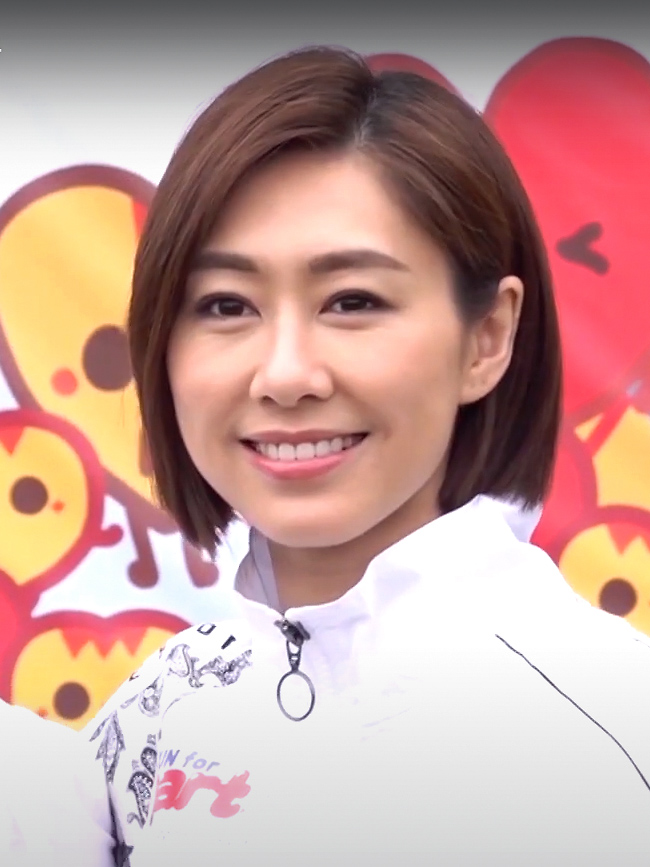
- Wu in May 2019
- Born: Nancy Wu Ting Yan; 9 September 1981 (age 45); British Hong Kong
- Occupations: Actress; singer
- Years active: 2001–present
- Spouse: Akin Chan (m. 2025)
- Awards: TVB Anniversary Awards – Best Actress'; 2015 Ghost of Relativity; 2016 A Fist Within Four Walls; Best Supporting Actress; 2012 Gloves Come Off Most Improved Female Artiste; 2008 Wars of In-Laws II, D.I.E., Legend of the Demigods, The Silver Chamber of Sorrows, Strictly Come Dancing II Jade Solid Gold Best Ten Music Group Song Award; 2016 Never Know You Are the Best 從未知道你最好 with (Ruco Chan)

Chinese name
- Traditional Chinese: 胡定欣
Transcriptions
Standard Mandarin
- Hanyu Pinyin: hú dìngxīn
Yue: Cantonese
- Yale Romanization: Wù dihngyān
- Jyutping: Wu4 Ding6 Jan1
- Musical career
- Origin: Hong Kong

Nancy Wu Ting Yan (Chinese: 胡定欣) (born 9 September 1981) is a Hong Kong actress contracted to TVB and Shaw Brothers Pictures.

Wu won the TVB Anniversary Award for Best Actress consecutively in 2015 and 2016. Some of the roles she is best known for include Wan Wan in Twin Of Brothers (2004); Eva in Forensic Heroes III (2011); Ting Ting in Gloves Come Off (2012); Coco in Triumph in the Skies II (2013); Gin in Ghost Of Relativity (2015); Tiu Lan in A Fist Within Four Walls (2016); To Man in Mission Run (2022); Sarah in Narcotic Heroes (2023); and Seventh Master in No Return (2024).

== Early life ==
Wu was born and raised in the Central and Western District of Hong Kong. She has parents, and a younger brother. Her father managed the family seafood shop in Sai Wan, but closed it in 2002 due to the economy. As the eldest daughter of the family, Wu began working to help support the family finances while studying, and later graduating from St. Margaret's Girls' College. Wu sang in school choir while she was in primary school; played track and field, and participated in a dance troupe while in secondary school.

== Career ==
Wu worked as a secretary prior to entering the entertainment industry. Unlike many of her best friends and colleagues who became actresses by competing in beauty pageants, Wu entered through singing, and modelling competitions.

In 1999, Wu participated in TVB's 18th Annual New Talent Singing Awards competition and finished in fourth place.

In 2001, she entered TVB's 3rd Annual Cover Girl Competition and won the Most Photogenic Award, the Most Fit Award, the Most Attractive Award, and the Overall Winner Award. Following that, she enrolled in the 18th TVB Acting Class and entered the entertainment industry.

The initial stage of Wu's acting career was marked by cameos and minor character roles in numerous TV shows often cast as a villain, either a temptress, a mistress, or a concubine. Her biggest, most memorable role early on was in Twin of Brothers as the free-spirited seductress Wan Wan. Her success in tackling the challenging role and turning Wan Wan into a cult favorite character gained Wu attention early in her career. Wu gained more recognition in 2008 where she won the Most Improved Female Artiste award at the TVB Anniversary Awards for her performances in D.I.E., The Silver Chamber of Sorrows, the Wars of In-Laws II, and Legend of the Demigods; and additionally nominated for Best Supporting Actress for her portrayal of Ha Fei Fei in The Silver Chamber of Sorrows.

From 2009 to 2011, Wu appeared in supporting roles in several dramas, including Rosy Business, No Regrets, Gun Metal Grey, Forensic Heroes III, and D.I.E. Again. In Forensic Heroes III, she played Eva Chow, an ambitious barrister.

In 2012, Wu won the Best Supporting Actress awards at the TVB Anniversary Awards, and at the Asian Television Awards for her breakthrough performance in Gloves Come Off where she portrayed a deaf Muay Ying, or female Muay Thai boxer; her convincing performance required learning sign language as well as boxing, and stunt choreography. The role also redefined Wu's onscreen image as an action heroine, and not simply a villain, or a concubine. Additionally, Wu received a Long Service Award from TVB for her contributions to the company.

A year later, she won the TVB Star Award Malaysia for Favourite TVB Supporting Actress for her reprise role as CoCo in Triumph in the Skies II wherein she portrays a woman undergoing the emotional tribulations of becoming a surrogate mother for a friend. Wu stated she strives for improvement with every role, working hard, and learning from fellow actors with the goal of being a leading actress. Among the actors Wu has worked with the most, and appearing onscreen together as a couple, has been Wayne Lai with No Return being their 8th collaboration.

In 2015 and 2016, Wu consecutively won both the TVB Anniversary Award for Best Actress and the TVB Star Awards Malaysia My Favourite TVB Actress award for Ghost of Relativity, and for her performance as the memorable, and iconic Tiu Lan in A Fist Within Four Walls.

Since 2016, Wu has played leading roles on TV, and have been nominated, and won major awards during TVB Anniversary Awards, TVB Star Awards Malaysia, StarHub TVB Award, People's Choice awards, and other organizations. Wu credits her success on family, and friends in particular leading actress Myolie Wu who encouraged Wu early on her career.

Wu has been involved in other performative works. She performed in the 2018 staging of By Chance: Xu Zhimo with Steven Ma where she sung Kunqu opera and danced with 3-meter length water sleeves. In the same year, Wu appeared in the film Men on the Dragon where she was nominated for Best New Performer at the 38th Hong Kong Film Awards, and won Best New Performer at the Movie6 Movie Awards. In 2024, Wu appeared in the movie Rob N Roll.

In 2020, Wu signed a contract with Shaw Brothers Pictures.

== Advertising work ==
Wu has been a paid spokesperson for Vita Green since 2014. She has also been the spokesperson for Suisse Programme since 2019.

== Advocacy work ==
Wu has done volunteer, promotional, and charity work with various organizations, and events.

She participated in the 2018 Ronald McDonald House Charities Hong Kong Open Day event, and promoted the organization's fundraiser in 2019.

In 2020, Wu visited Nepal as a Plan International ambassador advocating for girl rights and gender equality, and has participated in charitable fundraisers for the organization including Shine Together in 2022, and Run for Girls in 2023 and 2024.

Wu, along with William So, and Kimbee Chan participated in the 125th Anniversary celebration launch of Ebenezer School & Home for the Visually Impaired in 2021. She sang in a Food for Good fundraising dinner in 2023.

In 2024, Wu visited Ethiopia as a Plan International ambassador, and narrated a female genital mutilation awareness video for the organization.

== Personal life ==
Nancy Wu is best friends with Myolie Wu, Paisley Wu, Elaine Yiu, Selena Lee and Mandy Wong. They formed the sisterhood group "胡說八道會" after the Chinese idiom "胡說八道", meaning "nonsense talk", in addition to several members sharing the same last name, Wu "胡".

In 2017, the group filmed a travel show together called The Sisterhood Traveling Gang. The show won the TVB Star Awards Malaysia Favorite TVB variety show, and the SINA Weibo Star Award for Awesome Variety Show.

Wu is friends with Rosina Lam when filming the drama Short End of the Stick, and with Alex Fong whom they met as teenagers. While she is happy with her best friends, Wu has stated is not so easy to find somebody to entrust for life. Her previous partners include Deep Ng (2006-2008), Kenneth Ma, (2008-2010), Patt Sham (2011-2014), and Terry Chan (2015-2016).

Wu maintains a healthy, active lifestyle. Due to their common interest in long-distance running, Wu along with Benjamin Yuen, Joel Chan, Brian Tse, Jack Wu, Paisley Wu, Elaine Yiu, Selena Lee and Mandy Wong formed the group "Crazy Runner".

In 2018, Wu saved enough money to purchase a large house for her parents in Tuen Mun. She considers family important, spending time with her dad; and did not attend the 2023 TVB Anniversary Awards ceremony in order to celebrate her parents' anniversary.

In November 2024, Wu admitted to being in a relationship with doctor, Akin Chan. On 6 October 2025, she announced via social media they had gotten married in New Zealand.

== Filmography ==
=== Television dramas (TVB) ===
Year	Title	Role	Awards	Notes
2003	Point of No Return	Guest		Cameo
2003	Aqua Heroes	Nurse		Cameo
2003	The 'W' Files	Train Passenger		Ep. 11
2003	Virtues Of Harmony	Obese Lady		Cameo Appearance
2003	Life Begins at Forty	Tutor Worker		Cameo Appearance
2003	Seed of Hope	Nurse		Cameo Appearance
2003	Not Just a Pretty Face	Ann		Cameo Appearance
2003	Find the Light	Siu Yue		Cameo Appearance
2003	The Driving Power	Lily		Cameo Appearance
2003	Triumph in the Skies	Coco Ling Cheuk-chi		Supporting Role
2004	The Legend of Love	Third Fairy		Cameo Appearance
2004	Riches and Stitches	Po Family staff		Cameo Appearance
2004	Twin of Brothers	Wan Wan		Major Supporting Role
2005	The Zone	May May		Supporting Role
2005	Lost in the Chamber of Love	Cheung Nim Wai		Supporting Role
2005	Revolving Doors Of Vengeance	Maria		Cameo Appearance
2005	When Rules Turn Loose	Cheung Lai Kei		Supporting Role
2006	Welcome to the House	"Sugar" Tong Tong		Supporting Role
2006	Love Guaranteed	Julia		Cameo Appearance (Introduced in Ep.07)
2006	At Home With Love	Cindy		Cameo appearance
2006	Face to Fate	Sum Kong Hung		Supporting Role
2007	Ten Brothers	Yeun Tong-tong		Supporting Role
2007	Phoenix Rising	Yip Chi-Shan 葉芷珊		Cameo appearance
2008	Wars of In-Laws II	Iris	TVB Anniversary Award for Most Improved Female Artiste	Supporting Role
2008	D.I.E	Momoko	TVB Anniversary Award for Most Improved Female Artiste	Supporting Role
2008	The Silver Chamber of Sorrows	Ha Fei-fei	TVB Anniversary Award for Most Improved Female Artiste	Supporting Role
2008	Legend of the Demigods	Ka Lau Lo/Mok Che	TVB Anniversary Award for Most Improved Female Artiste	Supporting Role
2009	The Winter Melon Tale	Fok Sze Sze		Supporting Role
2009	A Bride for a Ride	Wong Sau Ying		Supporting Role
2009	Rosy Business	Sun Hoi Tong		Supporting Role
2009	D.I.E. Again	Momoko		Supporting Role
2009	A Chip Off the Old Block	Leung Peen-peen		Supporting Role (Introduced in Ep.11)
2010	A Fistful of Stances	Chow Bing-bing		Major Supporting Role
2010	Every Move You Make	Tang Ping-ping		ep 12-15
2010	No Regrets	Ma Lai-wah		Supporting Role
2010	Gun Metal Grey	Hui Man-sze	My AOD Favourites Award for My Favourite Most Promising Female Artiste	Major Supporting Role
2011	Forensic Heroes III	Eva Chow Yik-fei		Major Supporting Role
2011	Curse of the Royal Harem	Borjigit Ching-yu		Supporting Role
2012	The Hippocratic Crash	Nurse		Guest Appearance
2012	Daddy Good Deeds	Wendy Wan		Supporting Role
2012	Gloves Come Off	Ting Yan-chi	TVB Anniversary Award for Best Supporting Actress; My AOD Favourite Award for Best Supporting Actress; Asian Television Awards for Best Supporting Actress	Major Supporting Role (Introduced in Ep.06)
2012	The Confidant	Sin-yung		Supporting Role
2013	Season of Love	Kim Ho Chau-sang		Ep.11-15
2013	Triumph in the Skies II	Coco Ling Cheuk-chi	TVB Star Award Malaysia for My Favourite TVB Supporting Actress	Major Supporting Role
2013	Coffee Cat Mama	So Mei		Major Supporting Role
2014	Gilded Chopsticks	Nin Yeuk-bik		Major Supporting Role
2014	The Ultimate Addiction	Anson Fong Ming-yu	TVB Star Award Malaysia for My Top 15 Favourite TVB Drama Characters; StarHub TVB Award for My Favourite TVB Female TV Characters	2nd Female Lead
2014	Tiger Cubs II	Kim Kam Sau-kei		Supporting Role
2014	Overachievers	"Man" Mandy Ting Man-chi		1st Female Lead
2015	Ghost of Relativity	"Gin" Keung Yung	TVB Anniversary Award for Best Actress; TVB Star Award Malaysia for My Favourite TVB Actress; TVB Star Award Malaysia for My Top 16 Favourite TVB Drama Characters; StarHub TVB Award for My Favourite TVB Female Drama Characters	2nd Female Lead
2016	Short End of the Stick	Kam Heung		1st Female Lead
2016	House of Spirits	Chu Chan-chan		1st Female Lead
2016	A Fist Within Four Walls	Tiu Lan	TVB Anniversary Award for Best Actress; TVB Star Award Malaysia for My Favourite TVB Actress; StarHub TVB Award for My Favourite TVB Actress; TVB Star Awards Malaysia for My Top 15 Favourite TVB Drama Characters; TVB Star Award Malaysia for My Favourite TVB Onscreen Couple (with Ruco Chan); StarHub TVB Awards for My Favourite Onscreen Couple (with Chan); TVB Anniversary Award for Most Popular Drama Theme Song (with Chan); TVB Star Award Malaysia for My Favourite TVB Drama Theme Song (with Chan); StarHub TVB Award for My Favourite TVB Theme Song (with Chan); Jade Solid Gold Best Ten Music Honour Award; Jade Solid Gold Best Ten Music Best Group Song Award	1st Female Lead
2016	My Lover from the Planet Meow	"Cat" Chiu Yiu		2nd Female Lead
2017	The Unholy Alliance	Yuen Tsing-yan	StarHub TVB Award for My Favourite TVB Female Drama Characters; TVB Star Award Malaysia for My Top 17 Favourite TVB Drama Characters; TVB Star Award Malaysia for My Favourite TVB Onscreen couple (with Ruco Chan)	2nd Female Lead
2018	Deep in the Realm of Conscience	Wong Chun	Jade Solid Gold Best Ten Music Honour Award for theme song	1st Female Lead
2019	Justice Bao: The First Year	Wan Chin-yu		1st Female Lead
2022	Big White Duel II	Dr. Ip Ching		1st Female Lead
2023	Narcotics Heroes	Sarah Cheung Lam	Asian Academy Creative Awards National Winner Best Actress in a Leading Role	1st Female Lead
2024	No Return	Tang Kwai Sim (7th Master)		1st Female Lead

=== Television dramas (Shaw Brothers Pictures) ===
Year	Title	Role	Awards	Notes
2022	Mission Run	To Man / Lok Tsz-yan		1st Female Lead

=== Variety shows ===
Year	Title	Role	Awards	Notes
2013	Wellness On The Go	host episode 5		
2014	Wellness On The Go 2	host episode 5	TVB Star Awards Malaysia for Favorite TVB Information show	
2016	Wellness On The Go 3	host episode 9	TVB Star Awards Malaysia for Favorite TVB Information show	
2017	Wellness On The Go 4	guest star episode 2, 7	TVB Star Awards Malaysia for Favorite TVB Information show	
2017	The Sisterhood Traveling Gang	host	TVB Star Awards Malaysia for Favorite TVB variety show SINA Weibo Star Award for Awesome Variety Show	
2018	Roaming Siblings	host		
2024	Amazing Cut	host		

=== TV movies ===
Year	Title	Role	Awards	Notes
2024	Dream in Hengqin and Macao《尋夢琴澳》	Zhang Xi Yu		

=== Films ===
Year	Title	Role	Awards	Notes
2018	Men on the Dragon	Carol Yeung Man Kei	Movie6 Movie Awards for Best New Performer; 38th Hong Kong Film Awards Nomination for Best New Performer	
2024	Rob N Roll	Eileen		Special Appearance

=== Music video appearances ===
Year	Artist	Song	Notes
2002	Mango Wong	求籤	
2002	Emme Wong	鬧劇	
2004	Leo Ku	愛與誠	
2004	Leo Ku	飄流教室	
2004	Endy Chow	告一段落	
2005	Kevin Cheng	三角兩面	
2005	Louis Cheung	Mad U So	
2006	Hins Cheung	餘震	
2006	Alex Fong	ABC君	2006 version
2008	Andy Hui	天下有情人	
2014	TVB	We Are The Only One	
2016	TVB Amazing Summer 2016	乘風	
2019	Leo Ku	亂世情侶 Love in Troubled Times	

== Discography ==
Year	Song title	Drama/Artist	Notes
2012	日月 (Day and Night)	Song interlude to The Confidant, duet with Wayne Lai	
2016	從未知道你最好 (Never Know You Are the Best)	Song interlude to A Fist Within Four Walls, duet with Ruco Chan	Jade Solid Gold Best Ten Music Honour Award; Jade Solid Gold Best Ten Music Best Group Song Award
2016	得寵 (Pamper)	Song interlude to My Lover from the Planet Meow, duet with Kristal Tin	
2016	乘風 (Ride the Wind)	Theme to TVB Amazing Summer 2016, vocal ensemble	
2017	我有我美麗 (That's the Way I Am)	Main theme song to The No No Girl	
2018	無悔無愧 (Regretless)	Main theme song to Deep in the Realm of Conscience	Jade Solid Gold Best Ten Music Honour Award
2018	明月與海 (Moon and Sea)	Song interlude to Deep in the Realm of Conscience, duet with Steven Ma	
2019	亂世情侶 Love in Troubled Times	Duet with Leo Ku	
2024	紅蝴蝶 Red Butterfly	End Theme to No Regrets, duet with Wayne Lai	
2024	靈魂人物 Soul Mate	Song interlude to 尋夢琴澳 (Looking for Dreams in Hengqin), duet with Shaun Tam	

== Awards and nominations ==
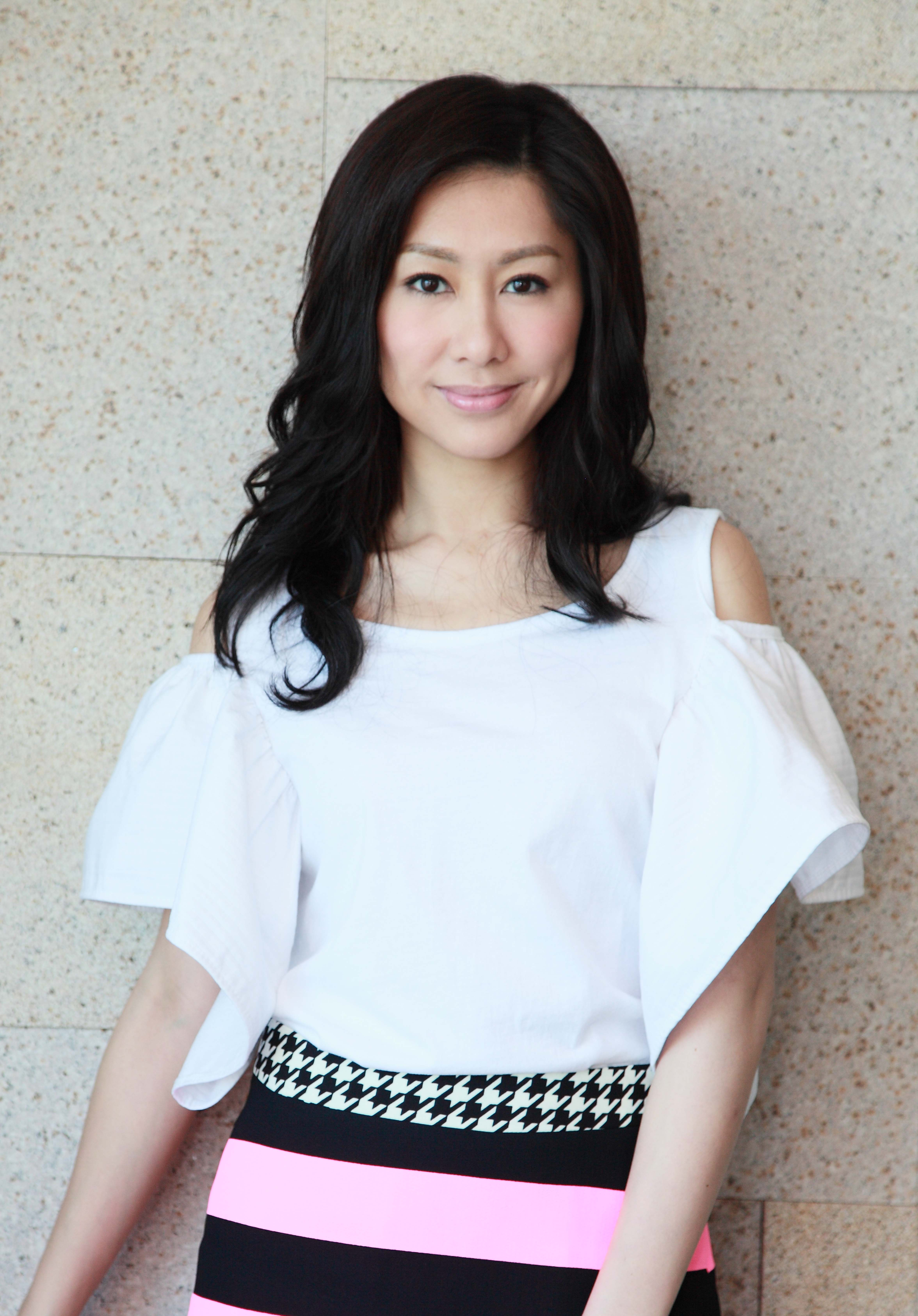
Wu in 2013

=== 1999 ===
- TVB 18th Annual New Talent Singing Awards: 4th place

=== 2000 ===
- TVB Magazine 3rd Annual CoverGirl Competition: Mei Bo Lin Most Attractive Award
- TVB Magazine 3rd Annual CoverGirl Competition: Nikon Most Photogenic Award
- TVB Magazine 3rd Annual CoverGirl Competition: California Fitness Most Fit Award
- TVB Magazine 3rd Annual CoverGirl Competition: Overall Winner Award

=== 2008 ===
- Strictly Come Dancing – Season II: 2nd Runner-up
- TVB Anniversary Awards: Most Improved Female Artiste
- TVB Anniversary Awards: Nominated - TVB.com Popular Award
- TVB Anniversary Awards: Nominated [Top 5] - Best Supporting Actress (The Silver Chamber of Sorrows)

=== 2009 ===
- TVB Anniversary Awards: Nominated Top 10 - Best Supporting Actress (Rosy Business)

=== 2010 ===
- TVB Anniversary Awards: Nominated [Top 5] - Best Supporting Actress (Gun Metal Grey)

=== 2011 ===
- TVB Anniversary Awards: Nominated [Top 5] - Best Supporting Actress (Forensic Heroes III)
- My Astro On Demand Favourites Awards: My Favourite Potential Female Artiste

=== 2012 ===
- TVB Anniversary Awards: Best Supporting Actress (Gloves Come Off)
- Asian Television Awards: Best Supporting Actress (Gloves Come Off)
- My Astro On Demand Favourites Awards: My Favourite Supporting Actress (Gloves Come Off)

=== 2013 ===
- TVB Anniversary Awards: Nominated [Top 5] - Best Supporting Actress (Triumph in the Skies II)
- TVB Anniversary Awards: Nominated [Top 10] - Most Popular Female Character (Triumph in the Skies II)
- TVB Star Awards Malaysia: Favourite TVB Supporting Actress (Triumph in the Skies II)
- TVB Star Awards Malaysia: Top 15 Favourite TVB Drama Characters (Triumph in the Skies II)
- TVB Star Awards Malaysia: Favourite TVB On-screen Couple (Triumph in the Skies II with Him Law)

=== 2014 ===
- TVB Anniversary Awards: Nominated [Top 10] - Most Popular Female Character (Overachievers)
- TVB Anniversary Awards: Nominated [Top 10] - Best Supporting Actress (Gilded Chopsticks)
- TVB Star Awards Malaysia: Top 15 Favourite TVB Drama Characters (The Ultimate Addiction)
- StarHub TVB Awards: My Favourite TVB Female TV Characters (The Ultimate Addiction)

=== 2015 ===
- TVB Anniversary Awards: Best Actress (Ghost of Relativity)
- TVB Anniversary Awards: Nominated [Top 5] - Most Popular Female Character (Ghost of Relativity)
- TVB Star Awards Malaysia: My Favourite TVB Actress (Ghost of Relativity)
- TVB Star Awards Malaysia: Top 16 Favourite TVB Drama Characters (Ghost of Relativity)
- StarHub TVB Awards: My Favourite TVB Female Drama Characters (Ghost of Relativity)
- Yahoo!Asia Buzz Awards: Most Searched Female TV Artistes

=== 2016 ===
- Jade Solid Gold Awards: Best Group Song (A Fist Within Four Walls' "Never Know You Are the Best")
- Jade Solid Gold Awards: Honour Award (A Fist Within Four Walls' "Never Know You Are the Best")
- TVB Anniversary Awards: Best Actress (A Fist Within Four Walls)
- TVB Anniversary Awards: Most Popular Drama Theme Song (Never Know You Are the Best with Ruco Chan)
- TVB Anniversary Awards: Nominated [Top 5] - Most Popular Female Character (A Fist Within Four Walls)
- TVB Star Awards Malaysia: My Favourite TVB Actress (A Fist Within Four Walls)
- TVB Star Awards Malaysia: Top 15 Favourite TVB Drama Characters (A Fist Within Four Walls)
- TVB Star Awards Malaysia: Favourite TVB On-screen Couple (A Fist Within Four Walls with Ruco Chan)
- TVB Star Awards Malaysia: Favourite TVB Drama Theme Song (Never Know You Are the Best with Ruco Chan)
- StarHub TVB Awards: My Favourite On-screen Couple (A Fist Within Four Walls with Ruco Chan)
- StarHub TVB Awards: My Favourite TVB Theme Song (Never Know You Are the Best with Ruco Chan)
- StarHub TVB Awards: My Favourite TVB Actress (A Fist Within Four Walls)
- StarHub TVB Awards: My Favourite TVB On-screen Couple (House of Spirits with Bobby Au Yeung
- People's Choice Television Awards: Nominated - Best Actress (A Fist Within Four Walls)

=== 2017 ===
- TVB Anniversary Awards: Nominated [Top 5] - Best Actress (The Unholy Alliance)
- TVB Anniversary Awards: Nominated [Top 5] - Most Popular Female Character (The Unholy Alliance)
- TVB Star Awards Malaysia: Favourite TVB On-screen couple (The Unholy Alliance with Ruco Chan)
- TVB Star Awards Malaysia: Top 17 Favourite TVB Drama Characters (The Unholy Alliance)
- TVB Star Awards Malaysia: Nominated [Top 5] - Favourite TVB Show Host (The Sisterhood Traveling Gang with Myolie Wu, Mandy Wong, Elaine Yiu, Selena Lee and Paisley Wu)
- StarHub TVB Awards: My Favourite TVB Female Drama Characters (The Unholy Alliance)
- SINA Weibo Star Award Awesome Variety Show
- People's Choice Television Awards: Nominated - Best Variety and Information Show

=== 2018 ===
- Jade Solid Gold Awards: Honour Award (Deep in the Realm of Conscience's "Regretless")
- TVB Anniversary Awards: Nominated [Top 5] - Best Actress (Deep in the Realm of Conscience)
- TVB Anniversary Awards: Nominated [Top 5] - Most Popular Female Character (Deep in the Realm of Conscience)
- TVB Anniversary Awards: Nominated [Top 3] - Favourite TVB Actress in Singapore (Deep in the Realm of Conscience)
- TVB Anniversary Awards: Nominated [Top 3] - Favourite TVB Actress (Deep in the Realm of Conscience)
- People's Choice Television Awards: Nominated - Best Actress (Deep in the Realm of Conscience)

=== 2019 ===
- Movie6 Movie Awards: Best New Performer (Men On The Dragon)
- 38th Hong Kong Film Awards: Nominated - Best New Performer (Men On The Dragon)
- TVB Anniversary Awards: Nominated [Top 10] - Best Actress (Justice Bao: The First Year)

=== 2022 ===
- TVB Anniversary Awards: Best Dressed Female Artiste Award
- TVB Anniversary Awards: Nominated [Top 5] - Best Actress (Big White Duel II)
- TVB Anniversary Awards: Nominated [Top 10] - Most Popular Female Character (Big White Duel II)

=== 2023 ===
- TVB Anniversary Awards: Nominated [Top 10] - Best Actress (Narcotics Heroes)

=== 2024 ===
- TVB Anniversary Awards: Nominated [Top 10] - Best Actress (No Return)
- Asian Academy Creative Awards National Winner: Best Actress in a Leading Role (Narcotic Heroes)
- Harper's Bazaar Beauty Awards: Harper's Bazaar Beauty Star
