= Darkside of the Moon (TV series) =

2024 Hong Kong television series

- Also known as: 黑色月光
- Genre: Revenge; Psychological thriller
- Written by: Leung Man-wah; Lui Sau-lin; Fong Ka-yat; So Ting; Cheung Kai-wing; Ko Lok-yiu
- Starring: Tavia Yeung; Vincent Wong; Rosina Lam; Edward Ma
- Opening theme: "Moonlight (月光)" by Kimberly Faith
- Country of origin: Hong Kong
- Original language: Cantonese
- No. of episodes: 25

Production
- Executive producers: Shu-kai Chung; Xie Ying
- Producers: Kwan Man-shum; Quan Xiang-lan
- Production locations: Hong Kong; Shenzhen
- Running time: 43 minutes
- Production companies: 77 Atelier; Youku

Original release
- Network: TVB Jade; myTV Super; Youku
- Release: 28 October – 3 December 2024

Darkside of the Moon (Chinese: 黑色月光; lit. 'Black Moonlight') is a 25-episode Hong Kong drama series produced by 77 Atelier in collaboration with the mainland Chinese streaming platform Youku. The series premiered on Youku on 9 October 2024 and on TVB Jade on 28 October 2024. It follows Yu Mun-yuet, a woman whose deeply traumatic past drives her to orchestrate a meticulous plan to infiltrate and exact revenge on those who wronged her. Starring Tavia Yeung, Vincent Wong, Rosina Lam, and Edward Ma, the series explores themes of vengeance and moral conflict.

== Cast ==
- Tavia Yeung as Yu Mun-yuet (Moon), a public relations expert whose traumatic past drives her to orchestrate a meticulous plan of revenge against the powerful Cheung family.
  - Jessica Liu as the young Yu Mun-yuet
- Vincent Wong as Shing Fung (Morris), a stock market strategist who becomes emotionally involved with Yu Mun-yuet and secretly aids her in executing a carefully planned revenge.
- Rosina Lam as Cheuk Wai-wan (Vivian), a former friend of Yu Mun-yuet who becomes the politically married granddaughter of Cheuk Ho-tin and is ultimately revealed as the mastermind behind Mun-yuet's traumatic past while pursuing her own ambitions.
  - Joey Leung as the young Cheuk Wai-wan
- Edward Ma as Cheung Kei-chun (Wilson), a wealthy, reckless heir whose past assault on Yu Mun-yuet and mismanagement of his family's business lead to tragic consequences.
  - Kris Lam as the young Cheung Kei-chun
- Priscilla Wong as Yu Hey-sun, Mun-yuet's disabled younger sister, traumatized by past assaults and living in fear, who gradually finds hope and determination to support her sister's quest for revenge.
  - Stephanie Au as the young Yu Hey-sun
- Lenna Yeung as Yu Man-sing, the eldest Yu sister, protective of Hey-sun yet distant from Mun-yuet, carrying the emotional burden of their family's past tragedies and unresolved conflicts.
  - Sophie Yip as the young Yu Man-sing
- Mat Yeung as Chu Pak-chung, a friend of the Yu sisters who helps Mun-yuet carry out her revenge.
  - Oscar Tao as the young Chu Pak-chung
- Mark Ma as Kwong Wing-yuen (Barry), Cheung Kei-chun's close friend who assaulted Hey-sun.
  - Wong Kin-fung as the young Kwong Wing-yuen
- Matthew Ho as Mok Ka-long, a righteous police officer and son of Mok Chun-keung
- Vincent Wan as Cheung Chit-yin, chairman of Bo Yip Construction and father of Cheung Kei-chun
- Candy Cheung as Chan Hing-fong, mother of Cheung Kei-chun
- Samuel Kwok as Cheuk Ho-tin, a wealthy business tycoon
- Jonathan Cheung as Cheuk Sai-kei (SK), Cheuk Ho-tin's nephew who has a feud with him
- Henry Lo as Yu Kai-fu, father of the Yu sisters
- Helen Ng as Cheung Bik-fan, mother of the Yu sisters
- Stephen Ho as Kwong Man-hoi, Kwong Wing-yuen's father who works at Bo Yip Construction
- Ethan Lam as Mok Chun-keung, a police officer who receives bribes from Cheung Chit-yin to cover up the Cheung family's crimes
- Derek Wong as Peter, a friend and colleague of Shing Fung

== Production ==
The series' story concept, centered on revenge, was inspired by the Korean drama The Glory. Filming took place in Hong Kong and Shenzhen, running from December 2023 to March 2024.

== Plot ==
The series follows Yu Mun-yuet (Tavia Yeung), a crisis public relations expert whose outward confidence and charm conceal a deeply traumatic past. Eighteen years earlier, Mun-yuet and her sisters—Yu Man-sing (Lenna Yeung) and Hey-sun (Priscilla Wong)—lived happily until tragedy struck. Mun-yuet was drugged and sexually assaulted by wealthy heir Cheung Kei-chun (Edward Ma), while her sister was assaulted by his friend Kwong Wing-yuen (Mark Ma). To protect his son, Cheung Chit-yin (Vincent Wan) bribed a police officer to conceal the truth, pushed the sisters off a hill, and framed their father for imprisonment. The destruction of her family, her sister's trauma, and her own estrangement left Mun-yuet scarred and fueled her vow for revenge.

She endured 18 years of suffering before rising in high society as a respected PR expert. Determined to expose those responsible, Mun-yuet uses her professional expertise and strategic alliances to infiltrate the Cheung family, navigating corporate power struggles, buried crimes, and moral conflicts as long-hidden truths gradually come to light.

== Music ==
Track Listing
No.	Title	Lyrics	Music	Artist(s)	Length
1.	"Moonlight (月光)"	Edith Södergran, Kong Fai	Kong Fai	Kimberly Faith	0:56
2.	"Dark Moon (黯月)" (in Mandarin)	Tiffany Ting	Kong Fai	Joey Thye	2:57

== Ratings and reception ==
In Hong Kong, the series ranked third on Google's 2024 "Top Ten Most Searched TV Dramas" list, but failed to achieve high television ratings. A writer from Oriental Daily News attributed its low ratings to shortcomings as a revenge drama, noting that it tells rather than shows the heroine's suffering. This approach, they argued, results in shallow emotional impact, unconvincing plotting, and a hollow revenge arc compared with The Glory and classic TVB tragedies, which earned audience catharsis through depictions of genuine suffering.

Week	Episodes	Airing dates	Ratings (Note: According to Hong Kong's TV rating system, each rating point represents approximately 64,670 viewers.)		Ref.
Week	Episodes	Airing dates	Cross-platform peak ratings	Viewership	Ref.
1	1 – 5	28 October–1 November 2024	19.7 points	1.28 million	
2	6 – 10	4–8 November 2024	19.9 points	1.29 million	
3	11 – 15	11–15 November 2024	21.2 points	1.38 million	
4	16 – 18	18–22 November 2024	20.4 points	1.32 million	
5	19 – 23	25–29 November 2024	20.1 points	1.31 million	
6	24 – 25	2–3 December 2024	19.7 points	1.28 million	

== Release ==
The series premiered on Youku on 9 October 2024, and on TVB Jade and myTV Super on 28 October 2024.

== Awards and nominations ==
Year	Award	Category	Nominated work	Results	Ref.
2024	57th TVB Anniversary Awards	Best Television Series	Darkside of the Moon	Nominated	
2024	57th TVB Anniversary Awards	Best Actress	Tavia Yeung	Nominated	
2024	57th TVB Anniversary Awards	Best Actress	Rosina Lam	Nominated	
2024	57th TVB Anniversary Awards	Best Supporting Actress	Priscilla Wong	Nominated	
2024	57th TVB Anniversary Awards	Best Supporting Actress	Lenna Yeung	Nominated	
2024	57th TVB Anniversary Awards	My Favorite Television Series (Greater Bay Area)	Darkside of the Moon	Won	
2024	57th TVB Anniversary Awards	My Favorite Actress in a Leading Role (Greater Bay Area)	Tavia Yeung	Won	
2024	57th TVB Anniversary Awards	My Favorite Actress in a Leading Role (Greater Bay Area)	Rosina Lam	Nominated	
2024	57th TVB Anniversary Awards	Best Television Theme song	"Dark Moon"	Nominated	
