= Big White Duel 2 =

Hong Kong TV series

- Also known as: Big White Duel II
- Chinese: 白色強人II
- Literal meaning: White Strongmen 2 / White Strongmen II
- Genre: Medical drama
- Created by: Marco Law Wing-yin
- Written by: Wong Wai-keung
- Starring: Roger Kwok; Kenneth Ma; Moses Chan; Nancy Wu; Natalie Tong; Kelly Cheung; Ram Chiang; Willie Wai; Shaopin Tsui; Lesley Chiang; Max Cheung; Virginia Lau
- Theme music composer: Alan Cheung Ka-shing, Schumann Lee
- Opening theme: "上流一族"
- Ending theme: "Wish" by JW Wong
- Composer: Kwong Ching-yan
- Country of origin: China
- Original languages: Cantonese; Mandarin; English
- No. of episodes: 30

Production
- Production locations: Hong Kong; Shenzhen; Shanghai
- Running time: 45 minutes
- Production company: TVB

Original release
- Network: TVB Jade
- Release: 25 July – 2 September 2022

Related
- Big White Duel (2019)

Big White Duel II (Chinese: 白色強人II) is a Hong Kong television medical drama produced by TVB. It stars Roger Kwok, Kenneth Ma, Moses Chan, Nancy Wu, Natalie Tong and Kelly Cheung as the main cast. It is the sequel to the 2019 drama Big White Duel, and is the 3rd installment in the Strongman series by Marco Law.

The drama made its premiere on Youku on 22 June 2022.

== Cast and characters ==
=== Marshall Paxton Hospital ===
Name	Portrayed by	Occupation
Dr. "YT" Yeung Yat-to	Roger Kwok	Chief Executive of Marshall Paxton, Head of Surgery Department, Chief of Service (C.O.S.) and Consultant for the Neuroendovascular Surgery (NES) Department, Neurosurgeon
Dr. Tong Ming	Kenneth Ma	Deputy Chief Executive of Marshall Paxton, C.O.S. and Consultant for the Department of Cardiothoracic Surgery (CTS), Cardiothoracic surgeon
Dr. "Vincent" Lee Man-shun	Moses Chan	Accident & Emergency (A&E) Associate Consultant, surgeon
Dr. Ip Ching	Nancy Wu	Chief Executive of Marshall Paxton, C.O.S. and Consultant for the Department of Oncology, Oncological surgeon, Medical Development Authority board member
Dr. "Zoe" So Yee	Natalie Tong	A&E Associate Consultant
Dr. "Yan" Lui Ngoi-ling	Kelly Cheung	NES Associate Consultant, Neurosurgeon
Dr. Yu Cham-sum	Ram Chiang	C.O.S. and Consultant for A&E

==== Senior Management ====
Cast	Role	Description
Roger Kwok 郭晉安	Yeung Yat-to 楊逸滔	YT: Chief Executive; Proposed opening a Drug Formulary that would greatly subsidize the cost of pharmaceuticals for every citizen. Proposal was passed in the legislative council.
Nancy Wu 胡定欣	Ip Ching 葉晴	Chief Executive; Proposed establishing an Asian Drug Research & Development Centre that would reduce reliance on profit-oriented pharmaceutical companies. Withdrew proposal right before a legislative council vote after learning the government would not have a controlling equity stake in the new centre.
Kenneth Ma 馬國明	Tong Ming 唐明	Deputy Chief Executive

==== Neuroendovascular Surgery (NES) ====
Cast	Role	Description
Roger Kwok 郭晉安	Yeung Yat-to 楊逸滔	YT: Department C.O.S. & Consultant; Yan’s boyfriend → fiancé → husband; Best friend with Tong Ming and Vincent; Cheung Ting’s ex-husband; Diagnosed with glioblastoma, recover after surgery
Kelly Cheung 張曦雯	Lui Ngoi-ling 呂靄寧	Yan: Associate Consultant; YT’s girlfriend → fiancée → wife; Best friend with Zoe; Vincent’s ex-girlfriend; Support YT’s proposal of fully opening the Drug Formulary
Patrick Lam 林溥來	Ling Wai-hong 凌偉康	Ben: Associate Consultant

==== Cardiothoracic Surgery (CTS) ====
Cast	Role	Description
Kenneth Ma 馬國明	Tong Ming 唐明	Department C.O.S. & Consultant; Zoe’s fiancé, later break up; Best friend with Yu Cham-sum, YT and Vincent; Support YT’s proposal of fully opening the Drug Formulary
Willie Wai 韋家雄	Ho Bing-kwong 何秉光	Hugo: Associate Consultant
Shaopin Tsui 徐肇平	Yuen Chun-fai 阮振輝	Medical Officer; Rachel’s friend → boyfriend
Lesley Chiang 姜麗文	Fan Wai-shan 范慧珊	Rachel: Medical Officer; Yuen Chun-fai’s friend → girlfriend

==== Accident & Emergency (A&E) ====
Cast	Role	Description
Ram Chiang 蔣志光	Yu Cham-sum 余湛琛	Department C.O.S. & Consultant; Best friend with Tong Ming; Has feeling on Zoe
Moses Chan 陳豪	Lee Man-shun 李文信	Vincent: Associate Consultant; Best friend with YT and Tong Ming; Yan’s ex-boyfriend, but still has a crush on her; Support YT’s proposal of fully opening the Drug Formulary; One night stand with Cheung Ting
Natalie Tong 唐詩詠	So Yee 蘇怡	Zoe: Associate Consultant; Tong Ming’s fiancée, later break up because of abortion; Best friend with Yan; Pregnant, but forced to undergo abortion due to seriously injured in first aid scene
Osanna Chiu 趙璧渝	Cheung Sin-hang 張善珩	Jackie: Medical Officer
Alex Yung 容天佑	Szeto Kit 司徒杰	Medical Officer
Doris Chow 周麗欣	Ma Wing-chi 馬穎芝	Paula: Medical Officer
Kris Lam 林俊其	Lam Shiu-leung 林紹良	Don: Medical Officer

==== Oncology ====
Cast	Role	Description
Nancy Wu 胡定欣	Ip Ching 葉晴	Department C.O.S. & Consultant; Develop feelings for Tong Ming
Wong Fei 王菲	Tsui Hiu-wan 徐曉韻	Wendy: Medical Officer

==== Nursing ====
Cast	Role	Description
Lily Poon 潘芳芳	Wong Ching 汪澄	Deputy Head Nurse; Advanced Practice Nurse; A & E Nurse
Aurora Li 李君妍	Au Tsz-yau 區子柔	Kate: Registered Nurse; A & E Nurse
Wu Fei 胡㻗	Tse Ka-chun 謝家俊	Roy: Registered Nurse; A & E Nurse
Elizabeth Wu 胡美貽	Lau Kei-kei 劉琪琪	Registered Nurse; A & E Nurse

=== Other cast ===
Cast	Role	Description
Max Cheung 張達倫	Wan Ming-cheung 溫銘章	Martin: Medical Development Authority Chairman; Support Ip Ching’s proposal; Thwart YT’s proposal from being passed in the legislative council
Virginia Lau 劉溫馨	Cheung Ting 張庭	TNN producer; YT’s ex-wife; Support Ip Ching’s proposal; Thwart YT’s proposal from being passed in the legislative council
Gary Chan 陳嘉輝	Chong Ho-ban 莊浩彬	Henry: Health Secretary
Willie Lau 煒烈	Chow Sai-cheong 周世昌	Financial Secretary; Refuse to increase grant for YT’s proposal
William Chak 翟威廉	Tsang Tsz Long 曾子朗	Professor of Pharmacology, Westminster Hospital; Ip Ching's late boyfriend; Suffered from Multiple Endocrine Neoplasia, type 2; Published a paper on establishing an Asian Drug Research and Development Center. Ip Ching brings this paper to Hong Kong in the hopes of fulfilling his dying last wish.; Died in surgery; (episode 7)
Lam King-ching 林景程	Ng Wing-hong 吳永康	Legislative councillor
David Chiang 姜大衛	Lui Chung-hok 呂仲學	Former Chief Executive of Marshall Paxton Hospital; Yan’s father; (Guest appearance in ep. 11)
