= Oscar Tao =

Hong Kong singer

- 涂毓麟
- Education: Global Business, HKUST
- Alma mater: The Hong Kong Academy for Performing Arts

Oscar Tao Yuk-lun (Chinese: 涂毓麟) is a Hong Kong singer, classical pianist, and host. He debuted on the ViuTV program "Good Night Show - King Maker" in 2018 and made his Hong Kong music debut the following year. In 2021, he co-hosted the TVB music program "Jade Solid Gold" alongside Eric Kwok and Kandy Wong. In 2022, he signed with TVB as a contract artist.

== Personal life ==
As a student at La Salle College, Tao also studied piano student at the Hong Kong Academy for Performing Arts. In his second year of secondary school, he received a scholarship to study at Harrow School in England. Tao majored in Global Business at the Hong Kong University of Science and Technology in 2021. Before becoming a full-time artist, he worked at Gaw Capital Partners.
