= Call of Destiny =

2024 Hong Kong television series

- Also known as: 異空感應
- Genre: Police procedural; Drama; Fantasy; Time travel; Romantic
- Written by: Tai Tak-kwong
- Directed by: Chan Siu-ling; Lai Pak-kin; Chan Hon-shing; Tam Sui-ming; Cheung Wing-fai
- Starring: Carlos Chan; Hera Chan; Nicholas Yuen
- Opening theme: "Sensations (遇感)" by Steven Suen
- Country of origin: Hong Kong
- Original language: Cantonese
- No. of episodes: 25

Production
- Producer: Amy Wong
- Production location: Hong Kong
- Running time: 43 minutes
- Production company: TVB

Original release
- Network: TVB Jade; myTV Super
- Release: 25 November – 27 December 2024

Call of Destiny (Chinese: 異空感應; lit. 'Resonance from Another Dimension') is a Hong Kong drama series produced by TVB, with Amy Wong serving as producer. The series premiered on 25 November and ran until 27 December 2024 for 25 episodes. It follows Fong Yat-chun, a criminal profiling expert, who assists the police in solving complex cases. Starring Carlos Chan, Hera Chan, and Nicholas Yuen, the series explores time travel, highlighting its effects on fate, moral choices, crime, and human relationships.

== Cast ==
- Carlos Chan as Fong Yat-chun (Jason), a principled criminal psychologist and professor with a sixth sense for danger, who receives mysterious calls from the future and works to prevent serial killings.
- Hera Chan as Ying Ho-lam (Edith), a justice-driven detective who partners with Yat-chun and is linked to her future self, Mary, across time. To prepare for her role, Chan underwent martial arts training and spent a month deliberately lowering her voice to make herself sound tougher and more "manly."
- Nicholas Yuen as Chong Ding-kan/Ying Tin-long (Duncan), a quirky forensic assistant whose cheerful demeanor hides deeper complexities, who forms close bonds with Yat-chun and Ho-lam.
- Zoie Tam as Chiu Tsz-hung, a strict senior inspector who leads the detective team and manages both professional and personal challenges.
- Anthony Ho as To Siu-bo, an intelligence officer and loyal friend of Ho-lam who offers support while harboring unspoken romantic feelings. His character serves as the show's comic relief.
- Henry Lo as Fong Yi-shun, a lawyer and Yat-chun's father
- Candy Cheung as Fong Chan Mei-yuen, Yat-chun's mother
- Amy Fan as Fong Yi-wai, Fong Yi-shun's sister and Yat-chun's aunt
- Mimi Kung as Ho Shuk-kuen, a beauty salon owner and Ho-lam's mother
- Chan Ka-fai as Ying Yau-san, a screenwriter and Ho-lam's father
- Janice Pang as Ying Ho-yu, Ho-lam's younger sister
- Rosanne Lui as Chong Mei-si/Chong Yuk-ling, Ding-kan's mother
- William Hu as Ngai Yiu-sing, a romance conman and former lover of Chong Mei-si
- Cheung Yik-tung as Tse Dik-fu, a Youtuber and Yat-chun's friend
- Janice Ting as Candy, Ding-kan's friend from the hospital who has feelings for him
- William Chak as Lai Ka-ming, a police inspector
- Jerry Leung as Lui Sir, a police inspector
- Lee Huk-hang as Yeung Ka-to, a psychiatrist and serial killer

== Plot ==
Criminal profiling expert Fong Yat-chun (Carlos Chan), who abandoned a legal career after uncovering his father's corruption, has long possessed the ability to glimpse future events. After returning to Hong Kong, he begins receiving mysterious calls and emails from the future warning him of a series of symbol-marked murders. He assists the police and, along the way, teams up with detective Ying Ho-lam (Hera Chan) and forensic assistant Chong Ding-kan (Nicholas Yuen) to prevent the crimes—but the killer always seems one step ahead. The messages come from "Mary," the future version of Ho-lam from a parallel timeline, who provides crucial information about the murders and warns that Yat-chun's love for Ho-lam could lead to tragedy. As the crimes escalate, Yat-chun must race against time to catch the perpetrator and change the course of events.

== Production ==
The series was produced by Amy Wong, with Tai Tak-kwong supervising the script, and directed by a rotating team of directors. Filming took place over four months, concluding in March 2023. The series features various action scenes.

== Music ==
Track Listing
No.	Title	Lyrics	Music	Artist(s)	Length
1.	"Sensations (遇感)"	Cheung Cho Kiu	Alex Lau	Steven Suen	3:17
2.	"The Vanished You (消失的你)"	Hayes Yeung	Alex Lau	Windy Zhan	3:44

== Ratings and reception ==
Week	Episodes	Airing dates	Ratings (Note: According to Hong Kong's TV rating system, each rating point represents approximately 64,670 viewers.)		Ref.
Week	Episodes	Airing dates	Cross-platform peak ratings	Viewership	Ref.
1	1 – 5	25–29 November 2024	20.6 points	1.34 million	
2	6 – 10	2–6 December 2024	20.3 points	1.32 million	
3	11 – 15	9–13 December 2024	21.8 points	1.42 million	
4	16 – 20	16–20 December 2024	19.8 points	1.28 million	
5	21 – 25	23–27 December 2024	19.5 points	1.27 million	

== Awards and nominations ==
Year	Award	Category	Nominated work	Results	Ref.
2024	57th TVB Anniversary Awards	Best Supporting Actor	Nicholas Yuen	Nominated	
