= Lenna Yeung =

Hong Kong actress (born 1977)

- Yeung in 2026
- Born: 10 November 1977 (age 48); Zhanjiang, Guangdong
- Occupations: Actress; singer
- Years active: 2001–present
- Notable work: Come Home Love
Lenna Yeung
- Traditional Chinese: 楊卓娜
- Simplified Chinese: 杨卓娜
Transcriptions
Standard Mandarin
- Hanyu Pinyin: Yángzhuōnà
- Musical career
- Also known as: 西瓜、Panda、Lenna、霞姐

Lenna Yeung (Chinese: 楊卓娜, Yeung Cheuk Na; born 10 November 1977), formerly known as Griselda Yeung, is a Hong Kong actress contracted to TVB and older sister of actress Tavia Yeung. She changed her English name to Lenna.

While her sister graduated from TVB Acting Class, she took part in Miss Hong Kong 2001 and received the Creative Cooperation Award with her group. She is best known for her role as Concubine Suen in Can't Buy Me Love and as the lawyer Fung Yin-ha in Come Home Love.

== Filmography ==
Television dramas
Year	English title	Role	Notes
2002	Square Pegs	Siu To	
2003	Triumph in the Skies	Suen Nga-lai	
2003	Better-halves	艷道姑	
2003	Point of No Return		Cameo
2004	Lady Fan	薛府丫環	
2004	To Get Unstuck in Time	Ting Tsz-wan	
2004	Vigilante Force	Nurse	
2004	War and Beauty	Kam Lan	
2004	The Vigilante in the Mask	So Yau	
2004	Split Second	CIB探員	
2004	The Last Breakthrough	Suki	
2005	Shades of Truth	Wing	
2005	Just Love	職 員	
2005	Love Bond	小太妹	
2005	The Gâteau Affairs	Linda Lau Lin	
2005	Misleading Track	Gloria	
2005	Healing Hands III	Nurse	
2006	Welcome to the House		
2006	Greed Mask	Fong Man-chi	
2006	War and Destiny	Mok Wai-lan	
2006	Forensic Heroes	Fung Siu-fa	
2006	Dicey Business	Judy	
2007	Survivor's Law II	Gloria	
2007	ICAC Investigators 2007	Linda	Episode 5
2007	Face to Fate	Kong Pik-ling	
2007	Best Selling Secrets	June	
2008	The Price of Greed	Lau Yan-yan	
2008	The Gentle Crackdown II	Chan Mei-ngor	
2008	Pages of Treasures	Ling	
2009	The King of Snooker	Chin Ka-ka	
2009	Just Love II	Anna	Episodes 3-4
2009	D.I.E. Again	Tsui Wing-hung	
2010	In the Eye of the Beholder	Man Lai-shun	
2010	Can't Buy Me Love	Concubine Xun	
2011	Show Me the Happy	Taiwanese Girl	
2011	Be Home for Dinner		
2011	Lives of Omission	Joyce	
2011	Super Snoops	Chui Chi-sau	
2012	Daddy Good Deeds		Episode 1
2012	Gloves Come Off		
2012	Friendly Fire		Episode 6 and 15
2012–2015	Come Home Love	Fung Yin-ha	Major Supporting Role
2013	Sergeant Tabloid		Episode 19
2015	Angel In-the-Making	Mrs. Kei	
2016	Love as a Predatory Affair	Yau Choi-fa	
2016	Law dis-Order	Danielle Lok Sze-wai	
2017	The No No Girl	Lina Sha Lin-na	
2017	The Unholy Alliance	Tina Cheung Yee-lin	
2017	Oh My Grad	Mrs Tong	
2018	Who Wants A Baby?	Wong Kai-miu	Major Supporting Role
2020	The Dripping Sauce	Man Yuk-yin	Major Supporting Role
2020	Brutally Young	Leung Kit-ching	Major Supporting Role
2020	Life After Death	Choi Man-wai	Guest Appearance
2020	Go! Go! Go! Operation C9	Betty Leung	Major Supporting Role
2021	Sinister Beings	Mrs Cheung	Episode 1-2, 16
2021	The Kwoks And Whats	young Lau Mei-lan	younger version of Nina Paw’s character
2022	Stranger Anniversary	Vicky Tin Nga-chi	Supporting Role
2022	Childhood In A Capsule	Elsa Lui Bik-sin	Major Supporting Role
2022	The Beauty of War	Tsang Wai-fong	Supporting Role
2022	I’ve Got The Power	Kiu Yeuk-sze	Supporting Role
2022	Go With The Float	Lo Ka-ka	Major Supporting Role
2022	A Perfect Man	Rosanna Law Siu-na	Major Supporting Role
2024	Darkside of the Moon	Yu Man-sing	Supporting role
2025	Anonymous Signal		Supporting Role
2025	Love Virtually	Audrey	Supporting role
