= Amy Fan =

Hong Kong actress

- 樊奕敏
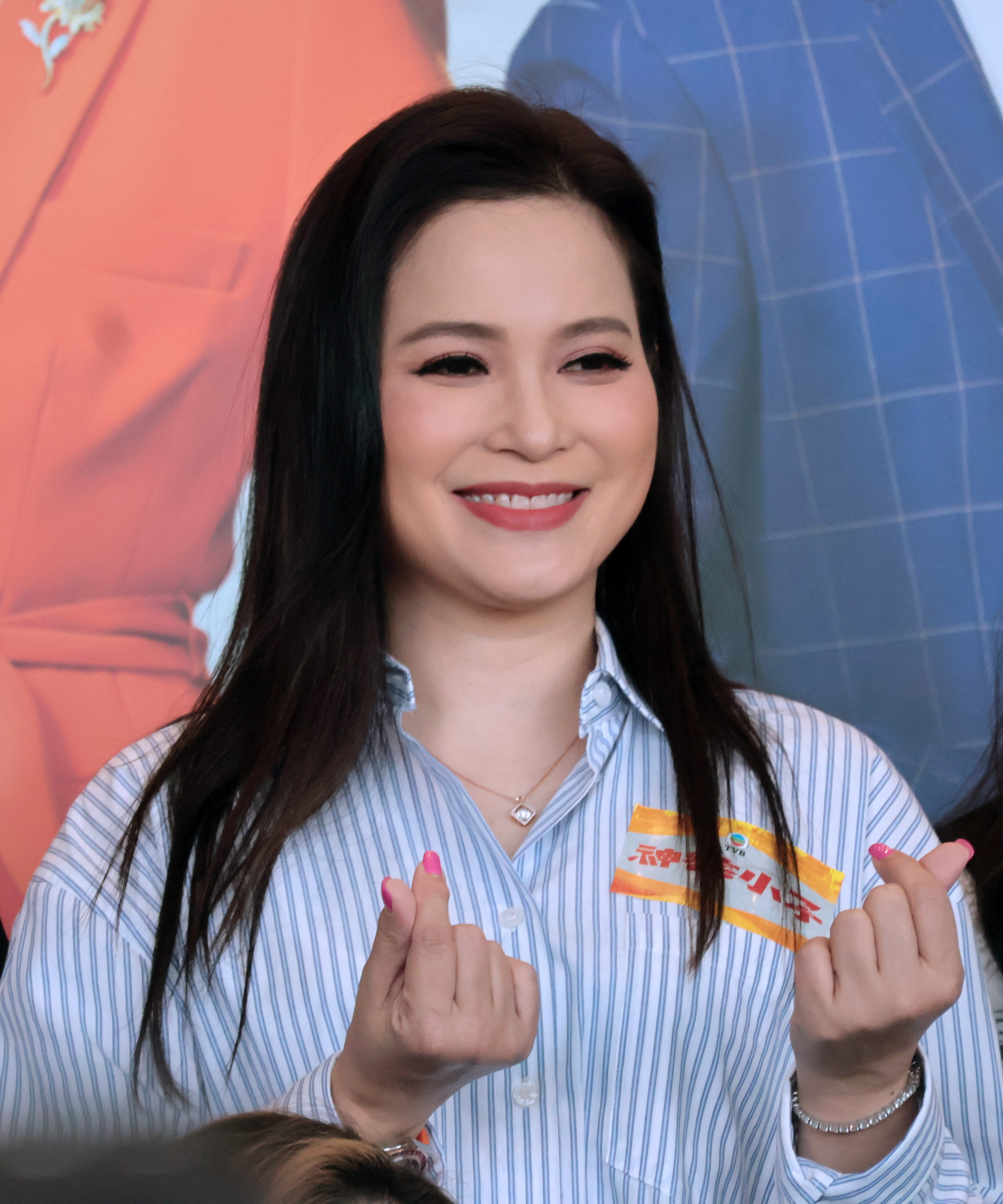
- Fan in 2024
- Born: 28 May 1971 (age 55); British Hong Kong
- Education: Holy Angels Canossian School; St. Mary's Canossian College; Tokyo International University
- Occupation: Actress

Chinese name
- Traditional Chinese: 樊奕敏
- Simplified Chinese: 樊奕敏
Transcriptions
Standard Mandarin
- Hanyu Pinyin: fán yì mǐn
Yue: Cantonese
- Jyutping: faan4 jik6 man5

Amy Fan Yik Man (born 28 May 1971) is a Hong Kong–based actress.

== Biography ==
Born on 28 May 1971 in Hong Kong, Fan grew up in a single-parent family after her parents divorced. Her stepfather is a Japanese engineer. Fan attend Holy Angels Canossian School and St. Mary's Canossian College. To have her able to communicate with him in Japanese, her stepfather sent her to study at the Japanese Language School of the Tokyo International University for two years.

Fan began her acting career in commercials. In 1991, she entered the Miss Hong Kong pageant and she won the Miss Photogenic award, placing 5th overall. After the pageant, Fan joined TVB and took part in numerous drama series.

Fan suffered from sudden hair loss for four years from 1991 to 1994. Later in 1996, she left TVB for Mainland China, where she was cast in the movie Tai Chi Master on the same year. She would often return to Hong Kong due to her frequent hospitalisation and also that the living environment in China was average. She joined ATV from 2007 to November 2009 before focusing her acting career in China again. She returned to work in TVB in March 2012. In 2022 she was one of the 12 contestants and the winner of the second season of TVB's variety show Dub of War.

== Personal life ==
She currently lives with her two pomeranian dogs, Kuma and Hana in Hong Kong. In 2013, she was appointed by close friend and veteran actor Gordon Liu as his new legal guardian of his assets and Fan assisted Liu with managing his affairs as he has physical limitations on his health issues.

== Filmography ==
=== Television ===
- Victory (1994)
- Highs and Lows (2012)
- A Great Way To Care II (2013)
- Karma Rider (2013)
- Outbound Love (2014)
- ICAC Investigators 2014 (2014)
- Rear Mirror (2015)
- Momentary Lapse of Reason (2015)
- Lord of Shanghai (2015)
- The Last Healer in Forbidden City (2016)
- Come Home Love (series 2) (2016)
- My Dangerous Mafia Retirement Plan (2016)
- May Fortune Smile On You (2017)
- Married But Available (2017)
- The No No Girl (2017)
- Nothing Special Force (2017)
- Come Home Love: Lo and Behold (2017–present)
- My Ages Apart (2017-2018)
- Watch Out Boss (2018)
- Apple-colada (2018)
- My Life As Loan Shark (2019)
- Death By Zero (2020)
- The Beauty of War (2022)
- Call of Destiny (2024)

=== Variety show ===
- Dub of War (2022)

=== Films ===
- All About Love (2010)
- I Love Hong Kong 2013 (2013)
- Office (2015)

=== Dubbing ===
- Dub of War's Second Season's Graduation Project: Spider-Man: No Way Home (2022) - May Parker
