= List of awards and nominations received by Rosy Business =

Rosy Business is a 2009 Hong Kong TVB television drama.

== Awards and nominations ==
=== TVB Anniversary Awards ===
Year	Award category	Recipients	Result
2009	Best Drama		Won
2009	Best Actor	Wayne Lai	Won
2009	Best Actress	Sheren Tang	Won
2009	Best Supporting Actor	Ron Ng	Nominated
2009	Best Supporting Actor	Pierre Ngo	Nominated
2009	Best Supporting Actress	Susan Tse	Won
2009	Best Supporting Actress	Kiki Sheung	Nominated
2009	Best Supporting Actress	Kara Hui	Nominated
2009	Best Supporting Actress	Nancy Wu	Nominated
2009	My Favourite Male Character	Wayne Lai as Chai Kau	Won
2009	My Favourite Female Character	Sheren Tang as Hong Po-kei	Nominated
2009	Most Improved Actor	Pierre Ngo	Won

=== Mingpao Magazine Entertainment Awards ===
Year	Award category	Recipients	Result
2009	Most Outstanding Television Programme		Won
2009	Most Outstanding Male Artiste	Wayne Lai	Won
2009	Most Outstanding Male Artiste	Pierre Ngo	Nominated
2009	Most Outstanding Female Artiste	Sheren Tang	Won
2009	Most Outstanding Female Artiste	Susan Tse	Nominated
2009	Most Outstanding Backstage Elites	Cheung Wah Biu, Chan Ching Yee (Editors)	Won

- The 1st drama to win all 4 awards in TV category

=== Yahoo! Asia Buzz Awards ===
Year	Award category	Recipients	Result
2009	Most Popular Drama		Won
2009	Most Popular Actor	Wayne Lai	Won
2009	Most Popular Actress	Sheren Tang	Won

=== TV Programme Appreciation Index Survey ===
Year	Award category	Recipients	Result
2009	Top 20 Most Appreciated Television Programs of the Year		#1 (80.83 points)

- The 1st TV drama to get the 1st position since the survey started in 1998.

=== Next Magazine Awards ===
Year	Award category	Recipients	Result
2010	Top 10 Television Programmes		#2
2010	Top 10 Television Artistes	Sheren Tang	#1
2010	Top 10 Television Artistes	Wayne Lai	#2
2010	Top 10 Television Artistes	Ron Ng	#8
2010	Top 10 Television Artistes	Susan Tse	#9
