= No Return =

No Return may refer to:

== Film and television ==
- No Return (1973 film), a Soviet romantic drama
- No Return (2010 film), a Spanish-Argentine thriller
- No Return (British TV series), a 2022 British drama series
- No Return (2024 TV series), a Hong Kong television period drama
- Aller Simple, or No Return, a 2022 French Canadian murder mystery TV series
- "No Return" (XxxHolic: Kei), a 2008 television episode

== Music ==
- No Return (band), French band
- "No Return", a 2008 song by God Is an Astronaut from God Is an Astronaut
- "No Return", a 2021 song by Polo G from Hall of Fame
- "No Return", the theme song from the TV series Yellowjackets
- "No-Return (Into the unknown)," a song by Le Sserafim from Unforgiven (Le Sserafim album), 2023
