= Lee Tim-sing =

- Born: 1949 (age 76–77); Hong Kong
- Occupations: Television producer, director, writer, actor
- Years active: 1969–present
- Awards: TVB Anniversary Awards – Best Drama; 2009 Rosy Business; Lifetime Achievement Award; 2009 Lifetime Achievement

Chinese name
- Traditional Chinese: 李添勝
- Simplified Chinese: 李添胜
Transcriptions
Standard Mandarin
- Hanyu Pinyin: Li Tiānshèng
- Musical career
- Also known as: Tim Gor

Lee Tim-sing (born 1949) is a Hong Kong television producer, director and writer.

== Career ==
After graduating from secondary school, Lee joined Television Broadcasts Limited (TVB) in 1969 as a set decorator. He became a director in 1975 and was promoted to a producer a few years later. Lee was also known for making cameo appearances in several television productions, including a guest appearance in an episode of the variety program Enjoy Yourself Tonight as "Street-sweeper Mau", a role for which he later became known.

In the early 1980s and late 1990s, Lee achieved great success in the genres of wuxia and action thrillers. Many of Lee's television productions also contributed to the popularity of rising actors of their time, such as Chow Yun-fat, Carol Cheng, Felix Wong, Andy Lau, Tony Leung and, recently, Wayne Lai. Most of Lee's works are produced by TVB.

In 2016, at the age of 68, Lee Tim-sing announced his retirement, ending his 48-year long career with TVB.

== Filmography ==
=== As director ===
Year	Title	Chinese title	Actors	Notes
1975		夜深沉		
1976		二叔		
1976	Hotel	狂潮	Chow Yun-fat, Cora Miao, Shih Kien, Deborah Lee, Ng Chor-fan	
1977	A House is not a Home	家變	Liza Wang, Tang Pik-wan, Bak Man-biu, Simon Yam, Ha Yu, Lee Heung-kam	
1978	The Giant	強人	Louise Lee, Chu Kong, Sheung Yee, Wong Wan-choi, Chow Yun-fat, Maggie Chan	

=== As producer ===
Year	Title	Chinese title	Cast	Notes
1978	Vanity Fair	大亨	Adam Cheng, Damian Lau, Lo Hoi-pang, Louise Lee	
1978	Conflict	奮鬥	Chow Yun-fat, Shek Sau, Angie Chiu	
1979	Over the Rainbow	天虹	Patrick Tse, Adam Cheng, Liza Wang, Carol Cheng, Alan Tam	
1979	The Good, the Bad, and the Ugly	網中人	Chow Yun-fat, Carol Cheng, Cora Miao, Simon Yam	
1980	The Brothers	親情	Chow Yun-fat, Carol Cheng, Simon Yam, Lam Tin, Wong Shee-tong	
1980	The Broken Thread	亂世兒女	Wong Yuen-san, Cecilia Wong	
1981	The Lonely Hunter	過客	Felix Wong, Michael Miu, Carol Cheng	
1981	The Fate	火鳳凰	Chow Yun-fat, Carol Cheng	
1981	Brother Four	富貴榮華	Adam Cheng, Simon Yam	
1982		新民間傳奇之韓嫣翠	Mary Hon, Shek Sau	
1982	Destiny	荊途	Ray Lui, Carol Cheng, Simon Yam	
1982	The Emissary	獵鷹	Andy Lau, Lau Kong, Deanie Yip	
1983		鴨仔里春光	Lee Heung-kam, Liu Wai-hung, Bao Fang	
1983	The Man in the Middle	夾心人	Adam Cheng, Barbara Yung, Liu Wai-hung, Joseph Lee	
1984	The Duke of Mount Deer	鹿鼎記	Tony Leung, Andy Lau	
1985	The Legend of Ching Lady	呂四娘	Carol Cheng, Ray Lui, Simon Yam	
1985		遊龍戲鳳	Liu Wai-hung, Simon Yam	
1985		我愛伊人		
1985	The Yang's Saga	楊家將	Andy Lau, Tony Leung, Chow Yun-fat, Felix Wong, Michael Miu, etc.	Largest star-studded ensemble cast
1986	Changing Partners	執位夫妻	Carol Cheng, Kenneth Tsang	
1986		哥哥的女友	Various	
1987	Foundling's Progress	男兒本色	Wilson Lam, Barbara Chan, Leon Lai	
1987	The Legend of the Book and the Sword	書劍恩仇錄	Pang Man-kin, Simon Yam, Jacqueline Law, Fiona Leung, Kitty Lai, Lawrence Ng	
1988	The Tribulation of Life	阿德也瘋狂	Lau Kong, Wong Yee-kam, Jacqueline Law, Maggie Siu, Stephen Chow	
1988		風流父子兵	Kenneth Tsang, Li Ka-sing, Susanna Au-yeung	
1989		霓紅姐妹花		Television film
1989		綫人		Television film
1990		綫人		Television film
1990		越柙飛龍		Television film
1990		夕陽戰士		Television film
1990		霓紅姐妹花續集		Television film
1993	The Vampire Returns	大頭綠衣鬥殭屍	Chin Siu-ho, Wayne Lai, Billy Lau, Sammi Cheng, Chor Yuen, Simon Lui, Emily Kwan	
1994	The Legend of the Condor Heroes	射鵰英雄傳	Julian Cheung, Athena Chu, Gallen Lo, Emily Kwan	
1994		瑪莉的抉擇		Television film
1995		愛到盡頭		Television film
1995	The Condor Heroes 95	神鵰俠侶	Louis Koo, Carmen Lee, Jason Lau, Ngai Chau-wah, Suet Lei	
1996	State of Divinity	笑傲江湖	Jackie Lui, Fiona Leung, Cherrie Chan, Timmy Ho	
1997	Demi-Gods and Semi-Devils	天龍八部	Felix Wong, Benny Chan, Louis Fan, Carmen Lee	
1998	The Duke of Mount Deer	鹿鼎記	Jordan Chan, Steven Ma	
1999	The Flying Fox of Snowy Mountain	雪山飛狐	Felix Wong, Sunny Chan, Charmaine Sheh, Maggie Siu, Joyce Tang, Marco Ngai	
2000	Crimson Sabre	碧血劍	Gordon Lam, Kwong Wah, Charmaine Sheh, Sarah Au, Melissa Ng	
2001	Reaching Out	美麗人生	Gordon Lam, Kenix Kwok, Benny Chan, Michelle Ye	
2001	The Stamp of Love	肥婆奶奶扭計媳	Lydia Shum, Kwong Wah, Anne Heung	
2002	The Battle Against Evil	轉世驚情	Auguste Kwan, Michael Tong, Mimi Lo, Moses Chan, Jade Leung, Louisa So, Zuki Lee	
2003	Fate Twisters	黑夜彩虹	Lawrence Ng, Ada Choi, Gigi Lai	
2003	Point of No Return	西關大少	Damian Lau, Angie Chiu, Julian Cheung, Charmaine Sheh	
2004	The Conqueror's Story	楚漢驕雄	Adam Cheng, Kwong Wah, Maggie Cheung Ho-yee, Melissa Ng, Wayne Lai	
2005	Fantasy Hotel	開心賓館	Michael Tao, Wayne Lai, Melissa Ng, Angela Tong, Michael Tong	
2006	Safe Guards	鐵血保鏢	Steven Ma, Elaine Yiu, Wayne Lai, Kwok Fung, Kara Hui	TVB Anniversary Award for My Favourite Male Character (Steven Ma)
2007	Best Bet	迎妻接福	Michael Tse, Linda Chung, Wayne Lai, Anne Heung	
2008	Legend of the Demigods	搜神傳	Linda Chung, Benny Chan, Sunny Chan, Derek Kok, Halina Tam	
2009	Man in Charge	幕後大老爺	Kenneth Ma, Kate Tsui, Leila Tong, Matthew Ko	
2009	Rosy Business	巾幗梟雄	Sheren Tang, Wayne Lai, Ron Ng, Elliot Ngok, Kiki Sheung, Susan Tse, Kara Hui, Nancy Wu, Suki Chui, Ngo Ka-nin	TVB Anniversary Award for Best Drama; Next TV Award for Top 10 TV Programmes (#2); TVB Anniversary Award for Best Actor (Wayne Lai); TVB Anniversary Award for Best Actress (Sheren Tang); TVB Anniversary Award for Best Supporting Actress (Susan Tse); TVB Anniversary Award for Most Improved Male Artiste (Ngo Ka-nin)
2009	Sweetness in the Salt	碧血鹽梟	Steven Ma, Tavia Yeung, Raymond Wong Ho-yin, Kwok Fung, Halina Tam, Ngo Ka-nin	
2010	A Fistful of Stances	鐵馬尋橋	Kevin Cheng, Kenneth Ma, Yuen Qiu, Dominic Lam, Shirley Yeung, Selena Li, Natalie Tong	Next TV Award for Top 10 TV Programmes (#6); TVB Anniversary Award for Most Improved Female Artiste (Natalie Tong)
2010	No Regrets	巾幗梟雄之義海豪情	Sheren Tang, Wayne Lai, Raymond Wong Ho-yin, Fala Chen, Kara Hui, Elliot Ngok, Susan Tse, Ngo Ka-nin	Next TV Award for Top 10 TV Programmes (#2); TVB Anniversary Award for Best Actor (Wayne Lai); TVB Anniversary Award for Best Actress (Sheren Tang); TVB Anniversary Award for Best Supporting Actress (Fala Chen)
2011	Bottled Passion	我的如意狼君	Niki Chow, Raymond Wong Ho-yin, Elaine Yiu, Katy Kung, Raymond Cho, Claire Yiu, Rebecca Chan	
2012	The Last Steep Ascent	天梯	Moses Chan, Maggie Cheung Ho-yee, Kenny Wong, Aimee Chan, Helena Law, Edwin Siu	
2013	Bullet Brain	神探哥倫布	Wayne Lai, Ngo Ka-nin, Sire Ma, Edwin Siu, Natalie Tong	
2014	Noblesse Oblige	宦海奇官	Kenneth Ma, Tavia Yeung, Joel Chan, Benjamin Yuen, Lau Dan, Yoyo Chen, Cilla Kung, Ram Chiang	
2016	No Reserve	巾幗梟雄之諜血長天	Wayne Lai, Myolie Wu, Edwin Siu, Sire Ma, Susan Tse, Lau Kong	
2017	May Fortune Smile On You	財神駕到	Wayne Lai, Pal Sinn, Claire Yiu, Amy Fan, Matthew Ho, Kelly Fu, Jack Wu	
