= Can't Buy Me Love (2010 TV series) =

2010 Hong Kong television series

- 公主嫁到
- Genre: Costume drama Period drama
- Starring: Charmaine Sheh; Moses Chan; Linda Chung; Raymond Wong; Fala Chen; Kenneth Ma
- Opening theme: "萬千寵愛" performed by Susanna Kwan
- Country of origin: Hong Kong
- Original languages: Cantonese; Mandarin; Thai; Vietnamese; English; Indonesian; Malaysian; Hindi; Telugu; Tamil
- No. of episodes: 31 (Hong Kong); 32 (Overseas)

Production
- Producer: Mui Siu-ching
- Running time: 45 minutes per episode
- Production company: TVB Jade

Original release
- Release: 23 August – 3 October 2010

Related
- Beyond the Realm of Conscience (2009); Deep in the Realm of Conscience (2018)

Can't Buy Me Love
- Traditional Chinese: 公主嫁到
- Literal meaning: "The Princess Comes in Marriage"
Transcriptions
Standard Mandarin
- Hanyu Pinyin: Gōng Zhǔ Jià Dào
Yue: Cantonese
- Jyutping: Gung1 Zyu2 Gaa3 Dou3

Can't Buy Me Love (Chinese: 公主嫁到) is a 2010 Hong Kong television series. It is a grand production by TVB and starred Charmaine Sheh and Moses Chan, Linda Chung, Raymond Wong, Kenneth Ma and Fala Chen as the main cast for this series.

The television series was released in Hong Kong on TVB Jade network on 23 August 2010, in the third-line time slot (starting at around 21:30 in UTC+8), airing between Monday-Friday every night at this hour.

Like many TVB series, especially comedies, the name of the series is a pun. "公主嫁到" means "The Princess Comes by Marriage", while its homonym "公主駕到" which roughly translates to "The Princess Cometh" is a phase used to formally announce the arrival of a princess.

== Plot ==
Set during the Tang dynasty of China, Can't Buy Me Love tells the story of the Third Princess, Princess Chiu Yeung (Charmaine Sheh), of the Tang Emperor (Samuel Kwok), who is beautiful but very unreasonable, and, as such, no one wants to marry her.

The Kam family is the largest gold manufacturer in the grand capital Chang'an, but because they are deceived, the business runs into troubles. The second son of the Kam family Kam Tuo Luk (Moses Chan) has to marry the Third Princess to save the family business, because then they will have the right to manufacture gold pieces for the Tang Palace, the Third Princess only agreeing to the marriage because otherwise she would be married off to the Tibetan king Songtsen Gampo, as schemed by the evil Concubine Wei (Kara Hui).

The Princess brings many servants to the Kam family after marrying Kam Tuo Luk, and constantly comes into conflict with the members of the Kam family (Lee Heung Kam, Susanna Kwan, Louis Yuen, Raymond Wong Ho-yin). The Princess brings Szeto Ngan Ping (Fala Chen), with her to the Kam family, who has been awarded "Best Servant" by the Concubine Dowager Chui (Susan Tse) and later became wife of Ding Yau Wai (Kenneth Ma).

The Princess originally decides to leave the house, but when she misunderstands that the Kam family speaks negatively of her, she stubbornly stays. Later, she and Kam Tuo Luk fall in love. When the Kam family is convicted of a capital offence, she divorces Kam Tuo Luk to secretly save the Kam family.

== Development ==
After the huge success of Beyond the Realm of Conscience, the filming of a similarly set costume drama comedy was announced. Can't Buy Me Love was featured in the TVB 2010 sales presentation clip, which was released shortly after the TVB Awards Presentation.

The drama became popular compared to Beyond the Realm of Conscience due to its similar lavish costumes and sets, cast members, and close time period (both set during the Tang dynasty of China). They were also compared to since Can't Buy Me Love also had links with the Tang imperial palace, though it had far more scenes outside the palace. It has also been widely and popularly named the indirect sequel (although it should really be a prequel, due to it being set during Taizong's reign) to its predecessor, despite their entirely different genres (Can't Buy Me Love being a romantic comedy, while Beyond the Realm of Conscience being a historical drama). The two series share the same producer, Mui Siu Ching.

To capture the grandeur of the Tang dynasty, custom-made elaborate costumes and sets were created for the series, resembling those of Beyond the Realm of Conscience in a comical way. Elaborate costumes have been made for grand series produced by TVB in the past, especially costume dramas including War and Beauty and The Charm Beneath. A costume fitting featuring majority of the cast was held on 17 December 2009 at 12:30 pm in Hong Kong, in front of the Shaolin Temple in TVB City's Ancient Street, Tseung Kwan O. A blessing ceremony was held for Can't Buy Me Love on 26 February 2010. Filming was completed in April 2010.

Especially grand was Charmaine Sheh's wedding ceremony headgear. The heavy headwear proved to be difficult for the cast and resulted in injuries and discomforts during filming. Television Broadcasts Limited created much hype prior to the release of the series, having numerous news on the progress of the series' filming published on TVB Weekly magazine and letting out news on the filming progress.

Three official trailers were released near the date of release, the first making a parody out of Beyond the Realm of Conscience. Malaysia's Astro on Demand channel also showed previews of the drama. Because of the drama's high ratings during the early episodes (the series reportedly managed a peak of 36 points in its first week) and a celebratory event was scheduled. However, because of the hostage-taking incident in the Philippines, the event was cancelled and the Hong Kong Broadcasting Authority received complaints for a comedy being aired at a tragic time.

== Format ==
The television series is a romantic comedy costume drama, featuring lavish costumes and sets intended to capture the luxury and grandeur of the Tang dynasty, and makes parodies out of other Hong Kong television shows, including dramas and varieties. The show regularly utilizes numerous original poems throughout the series for comedic effect, the poems being a hybrid between classical Chinese compositions and modern rap in terms of both structure and word choice.

The drama is set to have 32 episodes, with a definitive beginning and ending to the story. Each episode is around 45 minutes long. Bickering is a major part of the comedic aspect of the drama. Apart from this romantic plot, the series also focuses on the protagonists under threat from villains, and therefore part of the plot focuses on scheming in the palace. This theme (especially those within the imperial harem, such as imperial concubines) have long been in existence in TVB dramas, especially after the hit 2004 TVB series War and Beauty.

The series, apart from the main couple, Charmaine Sheh and Moses Chan, two supporting couples, Linda Chung and Raymond Wong Ho-yin, Fala Chen and Kenneth Ma also share a romantic storyline.

== Historical trivia ==
- None of the princesses featured in the drama are historically recorded princesses, though their names are loosely based on popular characters given to imperial princesses. The princesses in the drama are named, in descending age or ranking, Princess Yonghe the Eldest (Sharon Chan), Princess Qingyun (Tracy Ip), Princess Zhaoyang (Charmaine Sheh), Princess Qinping (Yoyo Chen), Princess Qinhui (Charmaine Li) and Princess Dexin (Linda Chung), none of whom are historically recorded imperial princesses.
- It is revealed that the fictional Princess Yonghe's (Sharon Chan) mother was Empress Zhangsun, who is revered as one of the most benevolent empresses of Chinese history. Empress Zhangsun made notable contributions to peasantry and labour, and even towards Chinese technology despite her elevated status as an Empress during her lifetime.
- The Emperor featured in the series is Emperor Taizong of Tang, the second Emperor of the Tang dynasty. Princess Zhaoyang (Charmaine Sheh) explicitly admires her father. Emperor Taizong, while still only a duke's son, assisted his father, then the Duke of Tang, to overthrow the brief Sui dynasty, thus establishing the Tang dynasty and paving the road for one of China's golden ages.
- The series reveals (fictionally) a reason for Princess Wencheng's famed political marriage to Songtsen Gampo of the Tibetan Empire. Princess Wencheng was probably not an imperial princess but a niece or maid of Emperor Taizong's or the Imperial Household's, who was married to Songtsen Gampo, forging an alliance between the Tang Empire and the Tibetan Empire. Princess Wencheng would later help to develop technology and more civilised and idealistic standards of living in Tuoba, which was then regarded by the Chinese as an almost barbaric empire.
- The series mentions (and probably exaggerates) gender equality during the Tang dynasty. The Tang dynasty was in fact a period of a Chinese history in which women were fairly liberated, with records of outspoken courtesans and women of prominent families playing the Persian sport of polo with gentry men. The first instance of feminism in the Tang dynasty was established very early on, when the daughter of the Tang's founding father Emperor Gaozu, Princess Pingyang, made large military contributions and in fact led military forces to help overthrow the Sui and establish the Tang.
- Emperor Taizong was the first husband of the young Wu Zetian, who would later become a favourite of Emperor Gaozong's, then his Empress consort, a regent power and eventually an Empress regnant in her own right, interrupting the Tang dynasty's early stages with the Later Zhou. Wu Zetian would rule as the only historically recorded female imperial monarch of Chinese history, and she would even further contribute to gender equality in the Tang after Princess Pingyang. Her efforts would include the installing Shangguan Wan'er as a political and literary scholar.
- The series references trade with foreign empires. China at the time was by far the world's largest economy, and many foreign empires and states paid homage to China and traded with China. Trade with the West flourished for China under the Tang. China also imported aspects of foreign culture. Chang'an, the Tang capital, was a cosmopolitan area boasting a huge population. Christianity reached China for the first time around the time setting of the series. Buddhism was imported during the Northern and Southern Dynasties from India and its presence was solidified under the Tang. Chinese hanfu also made major alterations, adopting some of the court styles of the Persian Empire. Sports, philosophies and consumer goods were all imported, as well as exported.

== Lead cast ==
Note: Some of the characters' names are in Cantonese romanization.

Cast	Role	Description
Charmaine Sheh	Princess Chiu Yeung 昭陽公主	Third Princess; Kam Tuo Luk's wife Daughter of Emperor Taizong and a silk-washerwoman from Yizhou; Is framed for being an impostor by Concubine Wei and becomes a civilian in Episode 23; Becomes Princess again after the truth was revealed in Episode 28; Gets kidnapped in Episode 29; Gets rescued by Kam Dor Luk in Episode 31; Has a daughter in Episode 32
Moses Chan	Kam Duo Lok 金多祿	Second son of Kam family Kam Tai Fu Yan's grandson Ding Loi Hei's stepson Princess Chiu Yeung's husband. Also has a daughter in episode 32

== Main cast ==
Note: Some of the characters' names are in Cantonese romanisation.

Cast	Role	Description
Linda Chung	Ng Sze Tak 吳四德	Kam family's maid, then housekeeper Becomes "3rd Princess" in Episode 23, after Concubine Wei frames Chiu Yeung as an impostor(Later found out to be the fake princess); Princess Chiu Yeung's adoptive sister in Episode 28; Kam Duo Sao's wife in Episode 32
Raymond Wong Ho-yin	Kam Duo Sao 金多壽	Third son of Kam family Kam Tai Fu Yan's grandson Ding Loi Hei's son Ng Sze Tak's husband in Episode 32
Fala Chen	Szeto Ngan Ping 司徒銀屏	Third Princess's servant and friend as well as body guard Concubine Dowager Cui awards her "No. 1 Servant"; Ding Yau Wai's wife in Episode 32
Kenneth Ma	Ding Yau Wai 丁有維	Matchmaker; Lo Tou-yun and Fong Hak-lan's son Szeto Ngan Ping's husband in Episode 32

== Recurring cast ==
Note: Some of the characters' names are in Cantonese romanisation.

Cast	Role	Description
Susanna Kwan	Ding Loi Hei 丁來喜	Boss of Kam Kam Ho Gold Shop; Kam Tai Fu Yan's daughter-in-law Kam Tuo Fuk and Kam Tuo Luk's stepmother Kam Tuo Sao's mother Yuen Siu Yuk and Princess Chiu Yeung's stepmother-in-law Ng Sze Tak's mother-in-law Ding Choi Wong's cousin and enemy/rival later became friends her father is Ding Loi Hei's Father, her mother is Ding Loi Hei's Mother
Lee Heung-kam	Kam Tai Fu Yan 金太夫人	Ding Loi Hei's mother-in-law Kam Tuo Fuk, Kam Tuo Luk, Kam Tuo Sao's grandmother Suffered from Alzheimer's disease later and cured after seeing Guanyin in her dreams
Sharon Chan	Princess Wing Ho 永河公主	First Princess; Chiu Wan's wife Daughter of Emperor Taizong of Tang and Empress Zhangsun; Enemy of Princess Chiu Yeung; Depreciated to a commoner, expelled from the Palace, and went mentally unstable in Episode 15; Was mentioned to be mending her ways later (Villain)
Louis Yuen	Kam Duo Fok 金多福	Eldest son of Kam family Kam Tai Fu Yan's grandson Ding Loi Hei's stepson Yuen Siu Yuk's husband and have five children while his wife is pregnant with another
Edwin Siu	Chiu Wan 趙弘	Princess Wing Ho's abused husband Leave the Palace to live with Princess Wing Ho in Episode 15
Selena Li	Yuen Siu Yuk 阮小玉	Kam Tuo Fuk's wife Have four daughters and a son while pregnant with another
Kwok Fung	Emperor Taizong of Tang 唐太宗	Princesses Yonghe, Qingyun, Chiu Yeung, Chuanping, Chunhui's father Deshan's adoptive father Concubine Wei and Concubine Xuan's husband
Susan Tse	Concubine Dowager Cui 崔太妃	Emperor Gaozu of Tang's concubine
Kara Hui	Concubine Wei 韋貴妃	Emperor Taizong of Tang's concubine Enemy of Princess Chiu Yeung and Kam family Committed suicide (by stabbing a sharp headpiece into her chest) in Episode 28 (Main Villain)
Griselda Yeung	Concubine Xun 孫貴妃	Emperor Taizong of Tang's concubine
Tracy Ip	Princess Qingyun 清雲公主	Second Princess; Hung Che-gong's wife Enemy of Princess Chiu Yeung later friends (Semi-villain)
Matthew Ko	Hung Che-gong 孔志恭	Princess Qingyun's husband
Yoyo Chen	Princess Chuanping 川平公主	Fourth Princess; Cheng Po Wife; Enemy of Princess Chiu Yeung later friends (Semi-villain)
Eric Li	Cheng Po 鄭浦	Princess Chuanping's husband
Charmaine Li	Princess Jinhuai 晉懷公主	Fifth Princess; Tai Dak Leung Wife but divorced in Episode 28; Enemy of Princess Chiu Yeung later friends (Semi-villain)
Jonathan Cheung	Tai Dak Leung 泰德亮	Princess Chuanhuai's husband, but divorced because he can't stand her attitude in Episode 28
Joseph Lee (李國麟)	Ding Choi Wong 丁財旺	Boss of Ding Fung Ho Gold Shop; Ding Loi Hei's cousin and enemy Mai Yan Che's husband Ding Yau Wai's adopted father
Mary Hon	Mai Yan Che 米仁慈	Ding Choi Wong's wife Ding Yau Wai's adopted mother
Ram Chiang (蔣志光)	Lo Tou-yun 羅道遠	Turkic peoples Fong Hak-lan's husband Ding Yau-wai's father Yu-Man Kit's subordinate Determined to overthrow Tang dynasty with Yu-Man Kit; Killed and sacrificed himself to protect his recently found son when fighting with Wong Mang in Episode 32 (Main villain)
Meini Cheung (張美妮)	Fong Hak-lan 方克蘭	Lo Tou-yun's wife Ding Yau Wai's mother Deceased
Vincent Wong	Yu-Man kit 宇文傑	A disguised philanthropist, actually a Turkic prince Lo Tuo-yun and Wong Mang's supervisor Determined to overthrow Tang dynasty with Lo Tou-yun and Wong Mang; Committed suicide when his plans failed and caught by Tang army in Episode 32 ( Main villain)
Tai Chi-wai (戴志偉)	Wong Mang 王猛	A Turkic General; Yu-Man Kit's subordinate Determined to overthrow Tang dynasty with Yu-Man Kit; Killed when fighting with Lo Tou-yun in Episode 32 (Villain)
Yu Tsz-ming (余子明)	Uncle Wing 榮叔	Kam Kam Ho's ex-shop manager, then Ding Fung Ho's ex-shop manager Threatened Kam Kam Ho to pay for his gambling debts Fired by Kam Kam Ho and Ding Fung Ho successively (Villain)
Tsui Wing	Uncle Po 寶叔	Ding Fung Ho's shop manager Plot with gangsters to kidnapped Mai Yan Che, but killed by gangsters in Episode 16 (Villain)
Elaine Yiu	Cho Kiu 楚 翹	A prostitute Kam Tuo Luk's dream woman Bribed by Princess Wing Ho to seduce Kam Duo Luk and separate him and Chiu Yeong
Lily Li	Aunt Mei 媚 姨	A brothel's operator Bribed by Princess Wing Ho to assist Cho Kiu to seduce Kam Duo Luk
Deno Cheung (張松枝)	Boss Mak 麥老闆	Boss of Mak Lee Ho, another gold store Incriminated Kam Kam Ho to sell fake gold (Villain)
Au Sui-wai (歐瑞偉)	Wong Ka-tung 王家棟	An assassin Ordered by Concubine Wai to determine to kill Princess Chiu Yeung; Killed by poisoning by Concubine Wai in Episode 23 (Villain)
Rosanne Lui (呂珊)	Chui Sim 徐嬋	Proclaimed to be Ding Choi-wong's cousin Stole Lo Tou-yun's son (i.e. Ding Yau-wai) and sold him to Ding Choi-wong; Killed by Lo Tou-yun in Episode 26 (Villain)
Li Hung-kit (李鴻杰)	Buk Yat Buk 卜一卜	A fortune-teller Kam Tuo-luk's friend Promoted to court astronomer for being very accurate in his predictions in Episode 31
Stephen Huynh	Luk Tung-chan 祿東贊	A Tibetan ambassador
Tam Ping-man	Uncle Lam Tin 林天叔	A former gang leader
Alice Fung So-bor	–	Grandmother of Princess Chiu Yeung; Deceased
Chuk Man-kwan	–	Mother of Ding Loi Hei; Incriminated by Ding Choi Wong; Deceased

== Episodes ==
No.	Title	Original release date
1	"Episode 1"	August 23, 2010
2	"Episode 2"	August 24, 2010
3 (Note: Aired at 10:15pm.)	"Episode 3"	August 25, 2010
4	"Episode 4"	August 26, 2010
5	"Episode 5"	August 27, 2010
6	"Episode 6"	August 30, 2010
7	"Episode 7"	August 31, 2010
8	"Episode 8"	September 1, 2010
9	"Episode 9"	September 2, 2010
10	"Episode 10"	September 3, 2010
11	"Episode 11"	September 6, 2010
12	"Episode 12"	September 7, 2010
13	"Episode 13"	September 8, 2010
14	"Episode 14"	September 9, 2010
15	"Episode 15"	September 10, 2010
16	"Episode 16"	September 13, 2010
17	"Episode 17"	September 14, 2010
18	"Episode 18"	September 15, 2010
19	"Episode 19"	September 16, 2010
20	"Episode 20"	September 20, 2010
21	"Episode 21"	September 21, 2010
22	"Episode 22"	September 22, 2010
23	"Episode 23"	September 23, 2010
24	"Episode 24"	September 24, 2010
25	"Episode 25"	September 27, 2010
26	"Episode 26"	September 28, 2010
27	"Episode 27"	September 29, 2010
28	"Episode 28"	September 30, 2010
29 (Note: Aired at 9:35pm.)	"Episode 29"	October 1, 2010
30	"Episode 30"	October 2, 2010
31 (Note: Aired as double episodes at 8:30pm. Some international broadcasts air the final two episodes separately.)	"Finale"	October 3, 2010

== International broadcast ==
Region	Network	Notes
Malaysia	TV2 & 8TV	Dubbed in Mandarin (Mandarin Dubbed and Malay subtitles on TV2)
USA	Cartoon Network and Disney Channel	Dubbed in English
India	Hungama TV and Pogo TV	Dubbed in Hindi, Telugu, and Tamil
Indonesia	RCTI	Dubbed in Indonesian
Singapore	VV Drama	Dubbed in Mandarin
Singapore	Mediacorp Channel 8	Dubbed in Mandarin
Malaysia	Astro Prima	Dubbed in Malaysian
Thailand	MCOT HD	Dubbed in Thai

== Accolades ==
=== 42nd Ming Pao Anniversary Awards 2010 ===
Nominees	Accolades	Results
Charmaine Sheh	My Most Supportive Performance	Won
Moses Chan	Outstanding Actor in Television	Won
Charmaine Sheh	Outstanding Actress in Television	Won
	Outstanding Programme	Nominated

=== TVB Anniversary Awards (2010) ===
Nominees	Accolades	Results
	Best Drama	Won
Moses Chan	Best Actor	Top 5
Charmaine Sheh	Best Actress	Top 5
Louis Yuen	Best Supporting Actor	Top 15
Susanna Kwan	Best Supporting Actress	Top 5
Moses Chan	My Favourite Male Character	Top 5
Louis Yuen	My Favourite Male Character	Top 15
Charmaine Sheh	My Favourite Female Character	Won
Linda Chung	My Favourite Female Character	Top 5
Fala Chen	My Favourite Female Character	Top 15
Susanna Kwan	My Favourite Female Character	Top 15
Lee Heung Kam	My Favourite Female Character	Top 15
Raymond Wong	Most Improved Actor	Won
Selena Li	Most Improved Actress	Nominated

=== 16th Asian Television Awards 2011 ===
Nominees	Accolades	Results
Charmaine Sheh	Best Actress in a Leading Role	Won
	Best Drama Serial	Nominated

== Viewership ratings ==
	Week	Episodes	Average Points	Peaking Points	References
1	23–27 August 2010	1 – 5	33	37	
2	30 August – 3 September 2010	6 – 10	33	35	
3	6–10 September 2010	11 – 15	33	35	
4	13–16 September 2010	16 – 19	33	—	
5	20–24 September 2010	20 – 24	32	36	
6	27 September – 1 October 2010	25 – 29	35	37	
6	2 October 2010	30	34	36	
6	3 October 2010	31 – 32	42	45	
