= Paul Gare =

Hong Kong actor

Paul Gare or Kei Biu-Law (born May 8, 1952, in Salt Lake City, Utah) is an American born Hong Kong television actor. Apart from English, Gare can speak Cantonese.

A graduate of RMIT University, Gare began his acting career in 1980 playing mostly as an extra and namely as a foreigner. He was contracted with TVB (1982–1999, 2008–present), then with Asia TV (1983–2000). Gare represents the traditional non-Chinese actor in Hong Kong whereas more recent actors have had more prominent roles.

== Filmography ==
=== TVB ===
Most of his acting appearances have been with TVB

- Love and Passion (萬水千山總是情) 1982 - as French consular official
- Looking Back in Anger (義不容情) 1989 - as Mr Brown
- The Greed of Man (大時代) 1992
- A Kindred Spirit (真情) 1995–1999
- Off Pedder 2008
- The Threshold of a Persona (ID精英) 2008 - as police officer
- Rosy Business (巾幗梟雄) 2009 - as doctor
- Burning Flame III (烈火雄心III) 2009 - as security guard
- A Watchdog's Tale (老友狗狗) 2009 (Episode 19)
- Off Pedder (畢打自己人) 2010 Mr. Johnson
- No Regrets (巾幗梟雄之義海豪情) 2010 - as doctor
- Bottled Passion (我的如意狼君) 2011 (Episode 7)
- Wish and Switch (換樂無窮) 2012
- L'Escargot (缺宅男女) 2012
- Queens of Diamonds and Hearts (東西宮略) 2012 - as doctor
- Master of Play (心戰) 2012 - as Johnson
- Ghetto Justice II (怒火街頭2) 2012 - as judge
- Highs and Lows (雷霆掃毒) 2012 - as doctor
- Silver Spoon, Sterling Shackles (名媛望族) 2012
- Bullet Brain (神探高倫布) 2013
- ICAC Investigators 2014 (廉政行动) 2014 as Mr. Lawrence
- Lord of Shanghai (梟雄) 2015 - as judge
- ICAC Investigators 2016 (廉政行动 2016) 2016 - as David Morgan's lawyer
- Law dis-Order (律政强人) 2016 - as Dicky
- Come Home Love: Dinner At 8 (愛·回家之八時入席) 2016 - as senior official
- Bet Her (賭城群英會) 2017
- Legal Mavericks (踩過界) 2017 - as lawyer
- The Unholy Alliance (同盟) 2017
- My Ages Apart (誇世代) 2017 - as Father
- Daddy Cool (逆緣) 2018 - as judge
- Fist Fight (兄弟) 2018
- The Ghetto-Fabulous Lady (福爾摩師奶) 2019 - as Mr. Potter

=== Asia Television 1983-1984, 1989 and 2000 ===
- 101 Citizen Arrest (101拘捕令) 1983-1984 - as police Inspector
- Storm in Shanghai (上海風雲) 1989
- Divine Retribution (世紀之戰[编辑) 2000
