= No Reserve =

Hong Kong television series

- Official poster
- Also known as: Rosy Business III; Rosy Business: No Reserve
- 巾幗梟雄之諜血長天
- Genre: Period drama Espionage
- Created by: Lee Tim-sing
- Written by: Ip Kwong-yam
- Starring: Wayne Lai; Myolie Wu
- Opening theme: "孤嶺花" by Kay Tse
- Country of origin: Hong Kong
- Original language: Cantonese
- No. of episodes: 30; 26 (TVB Jade broadcast)

Production
- Producer: Lee Tim-sing
- Running time: 45 minutes
- Production company: TVB

Original release
- Network: myTV SUPER
- Release: 1 October – 5 November 2016

Related
- Rosy Business (2009); No Regrets (2010); No Return (2024)

No Reserve
- Traditional Chinese: 巾幗梟雄之諜血長天
- Simplified Chinese: 巾帼枭雄之谍血长天
- Literal meaning: Veiled Heroine, Ruthless Hero: Espionage Through Continuous Time
Transcriptions
Standard Mandarin
- Hanyu Pinyin: Jinguó Xiaoxióng Zhi Dié Xie Cháng Tian
Yue: Cantonese
- Yale Romanization: Gān Gwok Hīu Hùhng Jī Dihp Hyut Chèuhng Tīn
- Jyutping: Gan1 Gwok3 Hiu1 Hung4 Zi1 Dip6 Hyut3 Coeng4 Tin1

No Reserve (Chinese: 巾幗梟雄之諜血長天), also known as Rosy Business III, is a 2016 Hong Kong espionage television drama serial created and produced by Lee Tim-sing for TVB. It is the third installment of the Rosy Business franchise. It stars Wayne Lai and Myolie Wu in the 3rd installment of the Rosy Business.

Set primarily in Canton, China (now known as Guangzhou) during the Second Sino-Japanese War, the show's story follows the affairs of Chinese spies and their entanglements with underground triads and the Empire of Japan. Wayne Lai stars as special government agent Kong Sheung-hung. Co-starring is Myolie Wu as Kong's partner Cheung Kei-sang, and Edwin Siu as their rival, Chau Sai-kai. No Reserve premiered on 1 October 2016 on TVB's streaming service, myTV SUPER. It later had a mainstream premiere at TVB Jade on 19 December 2016, with the series edited from 30 episodes to 26 episodes.

== Synopsis ==
Cheung Kei-sang (Myolie Wu) and the orphan Chau Sai-kai (Edwin Siu), two young lovers from a village in Southern China, are forcibly separated on their marriage day due to the Japanese invasion. Filled with hatred and vengeance, Sai-kai joins a Kuomintang secret agency, becoming their spy. Meanwhile, Kei-sang ends up in a Communist guerrilla militia and receives training to be their government's spy. She takes up a different identity as a Cantonese opera performer and cozies up with many Japanese officials, to the point of selling her body to extract military intelligence. She also meets Kong Sheung-hung (Wayne Lai), another Communist spy, and together they go on a mission to search for a Japanese businessman, who is linked to the war. They meet the businessman, only to discover that he looks identical to Sheung-hung. They learn that the businessman, Suzuki Kazuo, is actually Sheung-hung's long lost twin brother, who ended up in Japan and was raised by an abusive Japanese father. The repeated abuse turns Kazuo into a strange and psychotic man. In another mission, Kei-sang reunites with Sai-kai, but his ties with the Kuomintang puts their relationship at an impasse. Kei-sang is heartbroken to find Sai-kai turning into a psychopath, to a point of no return.

== Cast and characters ==
=== Main ===
- Wayne Lai as Suzuki Kazuo (鈴木一雄) and Kong Sheung-hung (江尚紅), a pair of twin brothers who were separated at a young age. Lai, who was willing to push aside other filming offers in order to accommodate his schedule to film No Reserve, was the first of the cast to be confirmed in late 2011. In regards of him portraying two different characters, Lai said, "It is difficult. The older brother ends up in Japan and is educated with Japanese culture, later becoming a Japanese businessman. He is also a man with wild ambitions and has a harsh childhood leading him to become a mad man. The younger brother stays in China and joins the guerrilla team... in the end, the two brothers will have to confront each other."
- Myolie Wu as Cheung Kei-sang (張寄生), a special agent for the Chinese Communist Party. She face the tragic loss of her father and younger brother leading to become a secret agent. Wu expressed that No Reserve is one of her most challenging scripts: "It is a powerful [story], with many ups and downs. It takes place during a war, so there will be tragic partings of life and death... it forces one to make certain decisions and choices. It's a brilliant script." On replacing Sheren Tang as the franchise's female lead, Wu admitted that the role had given her a lot of pressure, but said, "It is a completely new story. No one can replace [Tang]. Our performances will inevitably be compared, but I will do my best on my part." As for Tang's response, she said, "[Producer Lee] has already stated before that he could not come up with a suitable story line for me and [Lai] in [No Reserve]. I trust his judgment."
- Edwin Siu as Chau Sai-kai (周細雞), a Kuomintang special agent who eventually goes psychotic, raping and assaulting random innocent people for his amusement. He became the enemy of Kong Sheung-hung and Cheung Kei-sang. Siu said that he has never come upon a more challenging character to portray, also expressing, "But no matter how many girls I touch, I will still be faithfully in love with Sang (Wu's character) until the end." Siu is the second cast member to be confirmed to star in No Reserve. In 2008, Siu was in final negotiations to star in Rosy Business, but ultimately withdrew due to a schedule clash.
- Sire Ma as Kam Wan-ling (金韞凌), a fallen Qing dynasty princess. She has never been to the outside since when she was a child. Sneak away home to look for adventure in the outside world. She admired Kong Sheung-hung. She has a tattoo on her back connecting to the secret treasure of the former Qing dynasty. Ma was thrilled to be able to take part in the franchise, saying, "I have been hoping to take part in the franchise since I first heard that a third was in the making. It's a dream come true."

=== Supporting ===
- Li Shing-cheong as a former Qing dynasty official having false hope of restoring Qing dynasty raised Ling.
- Susan Tse as Ling's nanny who raised her with few Qing dynasty remnant.
- Lau Kong as a special agent of the Chinese Communist Party, supervisor of Kong Sheung-hung and Cheung Kei-sang.
- Cecilia Fong as the mother of Suzuki Kazuo and Kong Sheung-hung. She has one regret of having lost her older son during an earthquake in Japan.
- Yoyo Chen as ex-wife of Chau Sai-kai who he marries because of Kuomintang undercover mission to get closer to her father.
- Man Yeung
- Yu Yang as the father of Cheung Kei-sang who was killed by the Japanese Soldiers along with his young son.
- Helena Law as a village old lady
- Eric Li as a Kuomintang special agent, supervisor of Chau Sai-kai
- King Kong as Japanese military commander, brother-in-law of Suzuki Kazu who was used by him to reach his goals.

== Production ==
=== Development and filming ===
After the critical and commercial success of second installment No Regrets, TVB encouraged Lee to produce a third installment. Though Lee was initially against the idea, he agreed to helm the project if head writer and assistant creative director from the previous two installments, Cheung Wah-biu, would return to TVB after leaving in 2010. Upon learning that Cheung was tied to other projects, Lee put the production of No Reserve on hold, expressing that without Cheung, he would be unable to continue the franchise.

In December 2011, Lee announced that he would consider retirement after finishing the post-production work of his crime serial, Bullet Brain. Lee admitted that the unsatisfying ratings from his 2011 drama, Bottled Passion, significantly impacted this decision. Despite his hopes for retirement, TVB contacted Lee for a contract renewal in late 2012. Lee ultimately renewed his TVB contract in the spring of 2012 after TVB agreed to increase his pay and reduce his workload to one drama serial per year.

Lee began pre-production work on No Reserve in September 2012. Lee's longtime collaborator and Bullet Brain head writer, Ip Kwong-yam, was attached to the script. No Reserve was Ip's first TVB drama since leaving the company sixteen years prior. Ip drafted a preliminary script for No Reserve in May 2012 and began officially working on the project after the completion of Bullet Brain in August 2012. The Chinese working title of No Reserve was announced to be "Dip Hyut Chi Hung" (Chinese: 諜血雌雄; lit. 'Espionage Heroes'). The title was later changed to "Dip Hyut Cheung Tin" (Chinese: 諜血長天; lit. 'espionage through continuous time').

A costume fitting press conference was held on February 20, 2013. Principal photography began on March 11 in Hong Kong. Other filming locations included Foshan and Zhongshan. A blessing ceremony was held on April 8. Filming wrapped up in July 2013.

=== Casting ===
The success of Rosy Business and No Regrets relaunched the careers of main leads, Sheren Tang and Wayne Lai. Both leads respectively won best actress and actor at the TVB Anniversary Awards two years in a row for their acclaimed performances. In late 2011, Lai stated that he would be willing to push aside other filming offers in order to accommodate his schedule to film No Reserve. Lai reconfirmed this statement with the Singaporean media in July 2012. Tang also privately agreed to help Lee in No Reserve if her schedule allowed.

When the No Reserve project was announced to be reopened in September 2012, Lai re-confirmed his return. A few days later, Lee announced that Myolie Wu would replace Tang as the serial's lead actress. With the exception of Lai, a core star to the franchise, Lee indicated that No Reserve would feature an entirely younger and fresher cast. Lee received a lot of complaints on Wu's casting; the complaints said that Tang had an irreplaceable role in the Rosy Business franchise. When asked about it, Tang said that her schedule was booked and Lee explained he did not know how to produce another drama with both Lai and Tang after two incredibly successful stories. Wu's acting abilities were questioned by audiences. Lee defended Wu, gushing that Wu was a TVB fadan he wanted to collaborate with the most.

Following Wu's casting, Lee announced that Edwin Siu had been cast as the serial's second male lead. Natalie Tong and Sire Ma were also announced to have joined, but Tong left the cast in early 2013 due to schedule conflicts.

A sales presentation trailer was filmed in October 2012 and released in December to mixed reviews, with many thinking it was too similar to No Regrets. Helena Law, Yoyo Chen, Eric Li, Cheung Kwok-keung, and returning cast members Susan Tse and Li Shing-cheong were confirmed to join the cast in February 2013.

== Release & reception ==
When production first began, the Hong Kong media predicted that No Reserve would be one of TVB's anniversary dramas of 2013. However, in May 2013 when filming had hit its halfway mark, TVB pulled the drama from the 2013 broadcast lineup, and the series was being subjected to review by a censor board. It was said that the drama, which included sodomy and rape scenes, could be too violent for broadcast on a primetime network. Lee allegedly altered the story due to these restrictions. TVB had attempted to censor all the scenes alluding to the violence, cutting the drama from 30 episodes to 15.

After three years in broadcast limbo, TVB finally confirmed in July 2016 that No Reserve would be getting an October premiere on TVB's streaming service myTV SUPER. myTV SUPER aired the complete, uncut version of 30 episodes on 1 October 2016. The first five episodes were released on the first Saturday, followed by four episodes on the next every Saturday for four weeks and the last five episodes released the following week. TVB Jade aired an edited version (26 episodes) from 19 December 2016, everyday including weekends at 9.30pm.

By the time of its release in 2016, both female leads Wu and Ma had left the network. At a promotional event to promote its release in September 2016, Lai said TVB's hesitance to air No Reserve on television may be due to its political content rather than sexually explicit content; the producer Lee indicated that the censorship in 2013 was due to Sino-Japanese relations "at the time", in a reference to the 2012 anti-Japanese demonstrations, subsequently prompted an effort by regulators and filmmakers to limit over-the-top demonization of Japan by Chinese historical dramas, a subject that until then was rarely restricted.

The first 7 episodes averaged a viewership rating of 19 points during weekdays, 14.9 on its first Saturday and 16.5 on its first Sunday. The whole drama ended with an average of 20 points. The series was largely ignored and was met with mainly negative reviews from critics and audiences alike. Lai stated that it does not count as part of the Rosy Business franchise without Cheung Wah-biu involved when he was asked about a potential fourth installment in 2021. Many fans of the first two instalments skipped the series altogether largely due to the change in female lead. Comparing it to its two successful predecessors, audiences criticized the "old-fashioned" plot, the abundantly absurd historical inaccuracies, excessive sexual violence, and one-dimensional characters.

== Potential sequel ==
In November 2020, it was announced a fourth instalment was in development with both Wayne Lai and Sheren Tang from the first two instalments returning in the lead roles but due to the COVID-19 pandemic and script issues, production was delayed multiple times.

In October 2021, Tang and Lai acknowledged the overwhelming excitement over the potential sequel. They emphasized how much they also want to collaborate again and would put their hardest work into the project if it goes ahead but reminded fans if they cannot be involved in the project in the end, there will always be other opportunities.

TVB confirmed a sequel is in development as of March 2022.

However, Rosy Business 4 lacks the necessary support. TVB originally planned to collaborate with Youku, but the Chinese streaming platform decided not to continue with production plans after being dissatisfied with the first three episodes of the script with TVB having no choice but to go back and revamp the script, it is currently uncertain whether or not Rosy Business 4 will film at all. As the production schedule has been pushed back, Sheren already returned to China for work and has no immediate plans to return to Hong Kong.
