= Beyond the Realm of Conscience =

2009 Hong Kong television series

- Official poster
- 宮心計
- Genre: Costume drama; Period drama
- Written by: Ka Wai Nam; Sai Chui Jing; Ho Wing Nin; Tam Chui San
- Directed by: Fong Chun Chiu
- Starring: Charmaine Sheh; Tavia Yeung; Moses Chan; Kevin Cheng; Michelle Yim; Susanna Kwan
- Opening theme: "攻心計" performed by Susanna Kwan
- Ending theme: "風車" performed by Charmaine Sheh
- Composer: Tang Chi Wai
- Country of origin: Hong Kong
- Original languages: Cantonese; Mandarin; English; Vietnamese; Thai
- No. of episodes: 33

Production
- Executive producer: Mui Siu-ching
- Production location: Hong Kong
- Camera setup: Multi camera
- Running time: 42 – 45 minutes
- Production company: TVB

Original release
- Network: TVB Jade
- Release: 19 October – 29 November 2009

Related
- Can't Buy Me Love (2010); Deep in the Realm of Conscience (2018)

Beyond the Realm of Conscience
- Title screen
- Traditional Chinese: 宮心計
- Simplified Chinese: 宫心计
- Literal meaning: The Palace Conspiracy
Transcriptions
Standard Mandarin
- Hanyu Pinyin: Gōng Xīn Jì
Yue: Cantonese
- Jyutping: Gung1 Sam1 Gai3

Beyond the Realm of Conscience is a 2009 Hong Kong television period drama serial. Produced by Mui Siu-ching, the serial is one of two TVB productions to celebrate along with the channel's 42nd anniversary, the other being Born Rich. The drama aired five days a week on the TVB network with 45-minute episodes starting 19 October 2009. It stars Charmaine Sheh, Tavia Yeung, Moses Chan, Kevin Cheng, Susanna Kwan and Michelle Yim as the main leads.

Set in the latter years of the Tang dynasty, Beyond the Realm of Conscience tells the story of palace maid Lau Sam-ho and her relations in the Imperial Palace, beginning with her experiences in the Imperial Household Bureau (尚宮局). The series title roughly means "Plots in the Palace" and is a play on the phrase (攻心計), a homonym which roughly means "Plots that target and attack the heart".

== Plot ==
Gong Choi-king, a jewellery maker, is forced back into the palace with her daughter, Lau Sam-ho and their servant, Yiu Kam-ling. She was assigned the task of making a beautiful, gold hairpiece in the shape of a phoenix, with a luminous pearl as the eye and the feathers of a river kingfisher as the tail for the Empress Dowager. However, during the Empress' daily walk around the imperial garden, the phoenix headpiece suddenly weeped tears of blood. Taking this as a sign of bad luck, the Empress throws the hairpiece away and demands Choi-king to be severely punished. Choi-king suffers harsh beating as her punishment and passes away. Before her death, she tells Sam-ho to always remember the significance of her name ("Speak good words, do good deeds, show good will."). She also tells her to help and work together with Kam-ling as if they are sisters.

Around the time of Choi-king's death, Dowager Concubine Cheng's son, Lee Yi, the prince, encounters a 6 year old Sam-ho. He shows kindness to her by giving her some white flowers from Choi-king's favourite tree, the Chinese viburnum (瓊花), so she can take it to her dying mother. Empress Dowager was still very angry because of the hair piece and asked the new head of the Jewellery department, Yuen Chui-wan to shatter it. However, Yuen Chui-wan believed that the hairpiece is a one of a kind masterpiece, therefore she injures her own hand to protect it. She tells Empress Dowager that the hair piece is full of bad luck and if it is shattered, then all of the bad luck will merge with the air. Taking this as an advantage, Empress Dowager forces Dowager Concubine Cheng to wear the hair piece and tells her because of her good spirit, she can block the bad luck from the entering the palace. After a short period of time, bad luck begins to happen to Dowager Concubine Cheng and her son Lee Yi. A rumour spreads around the palace that Lee Yi fell from the tree and injured his head, causing his brain to remain as a 6-year-old boy forever. Lee Yi uses this as an excuse to escape the imminent death threat from the Empress Dowager. Sam-ho gives him some sweet lotus seed candy to comfort him on the journey as he is sent away from the palace. The young prince begins to develop a small affection for her.

The Imperial Household Bureau is responsible for managing and directing all household services to the Emperor and the Imperial family of the Tang Dynasty. It is made up of four departments, namely the Houses of Jewelry, Attire, Food, and Furnishing. Sam-ho and Kam-ling are introduced into the bureau in their childhood and are brought up as the disciples in the palace. Yuen Tsui-wan, Head of the Jewels, and Chung Suet-ha, Head of Attire, are both very fond of Sam-ho for she is a kind-hearted young girl and shows great capabilities in the decorative arts of jewellery and silk work. Both of them fight bitterly to have Sam-ho in their departments. In the end, Sam-ho is assigned to Department of Attire while, Kam-Ling is assigned to the Department of Jewelry.

Years later, a grown up Sam-ho meets Ko Hin-yeung, a palace scholar and also a chess teacher and the two share a secret love. A grown Prince Lee Yi, also grows up and returns to the palace. He eventually becomes the Emperor after evading assassinations with the help of Sam-ho and Hin-yeung. He promotes Hin-yeung as the Palace General because of his faithfulness. Sam-ho later becomes the Head of the Jewelry Department. Even though the Emperor has a deep feeling for Sam-ho and wants to have Sam-ho as his concubine, he buries his feelings for her when he discovers that Hin-yeung and Sam-ho are deeply in love and planning to escape from the palace but stayed to help him.

Sam-ho and Kam-ling continue their friendship, treating each other as sisters and this provokes jealousy among other palace girl servants. Time and time again, they will try to get Sam-ho and Kam-ling into trouble. However, Sam-ho's honesty and kindness charms many powerful people in the palace and they always come to her aid. Meanwhile, Kam-ling uses her cunning mind to eliminate her enemies. As time passed, Kam-ling realises to protect herself and to be able to survive in the palace, she has to be powerful and respected. She slowly works on a scheme to gain favour of the Empress Dowager Cheng, Yi's mother and is chosen as one of the Yi's concubines. She works on a bigger scheme to eliminate all her competitors, which eventually includes Sam-ho.

== Cast ==
=== Main ===
Note: Some of the characters' names are in Cantonese romanisation.

- Charmaine Sheh as Lau Sam Ho 劉三好.
- Tavia Yeung as Yiu Kam Ling 姚金鈴. Yiu is the Lau family's servant and adopted daughter.
- Moses Chan as Li Yi.
- Kevin Cheng as Ko Hin Yeung 高顯揚

Main characters : Lau Sam-ho (Charmaine Sheh), Yiu Kam-ling (Tavia Yeung), Lee Yi (Moses Chan), Ko Hin-yeung (Kevin Cheng), Yuen Chui-wan (Susanna Kwan), Chung Suet-ha (Michelle Yim).

=== Recurring ===
Note: Some of the characters' names are in Cantonese romanisation.

Cast	Role	Description
Michelle Yim	Chung Suet Ha 鍾雪霞	Head of Embroidery Proceedings→Head of Palace Proceedings in Episode 22; Marries Bo Kat Cheung on his deathbed
Susanna Kwan	Yuen Chui Wan 阮翠雲	Assistant Head of Jewellery→Head of Jewellery Proceedings in Episode 1→Head of Furnishings in Episode 14→ Head of Furnishings & Embroidery Proceedings in Episode 22; Married to Man Gim Fung in Episode 33 and has a long lost son with Man Gim Fung
Joseph Lee	Ma Yuen Zi 馬元贄	Head Eunuch; Commander Imperial household troops Cousin of Suen Ka Bik; Godfather of Concubine Yin; Died in Episode 33 (stabbed by Concubine Lai); Main Villain
Mary Hon	Empress Dowager Zheng 鄭太后	Concubine Dowager→Empress Dowager; Lee Yi's mother Died in Episode 32 killed by Lady Lai
Susan Tse	Empress Dowager Guo 郭太后	Empress Dowager → Grand Empress Dowager; Grandmother of Lee Chin; Lee Jau's mother Died in Episode 14 killed by General Ma
Rainbow Yeung	Choi Jong Ping 蔡仲屏	Head of Palace Proceedings; Retired and stripped of her status and possessions in Episode 19; Assumed dead due to hepatitis.
Ram Chiang	Bo Kat Cheung 布吉祥	Head Servant in the Palace; Bo Siu Chun's Adopted Father; Died in Episode 22 (Killed by Concubine Lai); Married to Chung Suet Ha on deathbed
Kara Hui	Tam Yim Sheung 譚艷裳	Head of Food & Beverages Proceedings; Niece of Choi Jong Ping; Semi-Villain up to Episode 19
Rosanne Lui	Wu So Yan 胡素恩	Head of Furnishings Proceedings (died in Episode 13, committed suicide); Tried to poison Yuen Chui Wan.
Selena Li	Concubine Yin (Man Po Yin) 賢妃 (also 万宝賢)	Concubine to Lee Yi in Episode 16; Miscarriage and died in Episode 31 (killed by Concubine Lai)
Yoyo Chen	Chin Fei Yin 錢飛燕	Palace Maid; Kam Ling's personal maid Betrayed Concubine Lai to reveal her guilt to Lee Yi in Episode 33; Semi-villain
Eric Li	Lee Jau 李宥	Emperor Muk Tsung; Died in Episode 2 Villain
Edwin Siu	Lee Chin 李瀍	Emperor Mou Tsung; Died in Episode 10 killed by General Ma
Jeffrey Wong	Lee Chun 李峻	Prince of Qi; Eldest son and heir presumptive of Emperor Mou Tsung
Tracy Ip	Noble Concubine Wong 王貴妃	Concubine to Lee Chin; Killed by orders of Grand Empress Dowager Guo to be buried with Lee Chin
Mandy Cho	Concubine Wai 惠妃	Concubine to Lee Chin; Died in Episode 9 (killed by Head of Army)
Lily Li	Tsui Ma Ma 徐媽媽	Maid of the Empress Dowager Guo; Beheaded in Episode 7 Villain
Cheung Kwok Keung	Man Gim Fung 萬劍鋒	General; Father of Man Po Yin; Paralysed in Episode 30; Married to Yuen Chui Wan in Episode 33
Eyvonne Lam	Suen Ka Bik 孫家碧	Man Po Yin's mother Cousin of Ma Yuen Zi; Executed in Episode 21; Accused for using dark magic that caused Concubine Lai's miscarriage Villain
Kwok Fung	Ko Yiu On 高耀安	Palace Chess Teacher; Hin Yeung's father Died in Episode 25 (Poisoned by Head of Army)
Vin Choi	Bo Siu Shun 布小順	Servant in the Palace; The Mistakened son of Man Gim Fung and Yuen Choi Wan in Episode 24 later god son Bo Kat Cheung's adopted son Chung Suet Ha's god son
Lau Dan	Li Tak Yu 李德裕	Prime Minister and Lee Chin's friend Died of illness in Episode 27
Leo Tsang	Physician Si 史太醫	The Royal Surgeon; Bribed by Concubine Lai to assist killing Suen Ka Pik, Man Po Yin and Empress Dowager Cheng; Died in Episode 32 (Killed on Ma Yuen Zi's command); Villain
Henry Yu Yang	Lau Chong Pak 劉松柏	Lau Sam Ho's father Died in Episode 25 (Poisoned by Head of Army)
Kristal Tin	Kong Choi King 江採瓊	Lau Sam Ho's mother Died in Episode 1 due to wounds from the punishment.
Kristy Leung	Siu Kam Ling 小金鈴	Lau Sam Ho's daughter
Jason Chan	Prince Dorji	Son of the Tibetan King
Ben Wong	Onizuka Kojiro	Japanese chess player

== Main characters ==
- Lau Sam-Ho – Sam-Ho is a kind-hearted maid who took her mother and father's teachings to heart. Her parents taught her to speak kind words, do good deeds, and bear a kind heart. She always cares for and helps everyone in the palace to the best of her abilities. She is very close with Yiu Kam-Ling, with whom she has sworn sisterhood. She is the love interest of both Ko Hin-Yeung and Emperor Lee Yi. Sam-ho started her service in the Department of Embroidery, but was eventually promoted to be the Head of Jewellery Proceedings. She was later chosen as Lee Yi's concubines because she was pregnant with Hin-Yeung's child. Lee Yi made her his concubine to save her.
- Yiu Kam-Ling – Kam-Ling initially starts out as a maid in the Department of Jewellery. During her time in the department, she suffers and perpetrates back-stabbing and torture. Her suffering leads her to believe that she has to plot, manipulate, and formulate schemes to survive and avoid further suffering in the palace. She eventually marries Emperor Lee Yi and becomes his concubine. She continuously schemes to destroy her competitors. She eventually became delusional and insane after Emperor Lee Yi punished her with lifelong confinement to her palace pavilion for all her evil deeds.
- Yuen Chui-Wan – In the beginning, Chui-Wan serves as Deputy Leader of Jewellery Proceedings. Her dedication and hard work are eventually recognized, and she is promoted to serve as Head of the same department. Chui-Wan is a self spoken, wise woman who never accuses anyone without proof. Throughout the series, she is made Head of Furnishing Proceedings and Head of Embroidery Proceedings. She is in a feud with Suet-Ha (Michelle Yim) because she accuses her of tampering with her food by adding an ingredient to which she was allergic. As a result of her sickness, she was not permitted to leave the palace with her lover, General Man. It is later revealed that she has a son with General Man. By series end, it is implied that Bo Gut-chong took their son out of the palace and left him in the care of an outside healer.
- Chung Suet-Ha – Suet-Ha starts out as Head of Embroidery Proceedings. She mistakes Chiu-wan for sabotaging her many years ago, causing her permit to leave the palace to be revoked. As a result, she was unable to see her dying mother. This starts a feud between the two friends who have once sworn sisterhood. She always opposes Chui-Wan. They eventually reconcile their differences. She is later promoted to be the Head of Palace Proceedings. When she thinks that Chui-Wan killed her to be husband purposely, she begins to try to make Chui-Wan suffer and wants to get revenge for her to-be husband. They reconciled by the end of the series and remained friends.
- Ko Hin-Yeung – The Emperor's personal guard. This role is assigned to him because of his loyalty to the emperor. He is skilled in martial arts, and even taught Lee Yi several moves that save his life. He also saves Emperor Lee Yi twice from the assassins sent by the previous emperor and the grand empress. He is the lover of Sam-ho and later marries her. They have a daughter in the last episode.

== Historical basis ==
Parts of the plot of the drama series are inspired or based on historical facts or beliefs.

=== Dramatized historical figures ===
- Empress Dowager Guo (Susan Tse) – Empress Dowager and Grand Empress Dowager Guo is based on a historical figure of the same name, who was recorded in history as being the rival of Empress Dowager Zheng.
- Empress Dowager Zheng (Mary Hon) – based on a historical figure of the same name, initially a maid to the Imperial Household who caught the Emperor's attentions and was elevated to the status of an imperial concubine.
- Emperor Xuānzong of Tang (Moses Chan) – based on Emperor Xuānzong who succeeded Empress Dowager Guo's grandson Emperor Wuzong of Tang as Emperor of the Tang.
- Emperor Wuzong of Tang (Edwin Siu) – based on the Emperor Wuzong who succeeded his brother Emperor Wenzong of Tang as Emperor of the Tang.
- Emperor Muzong of Tang (Eric Li (actor)) – based on the Emperor that preceded by Emperor Xianzong of Tang and succeeded by his son Emperor Jingzong of Tang. Neither of the latter two are featured in the series.
- Li Jun, Prince of Qi 杞王李峻 (Jeffrey Wong) – based on the eldest son of Emperor Wuzong, of whom nothing is known, in the series he assisted Emperor Xuānzong in defeating the character of Ma Yuan Zhi in return for the throne which he rejected in the end.
- Consort Wang 王貴妃 (Tracy Ip) – based on the favourite concubine of Emperor Wuzong, Consort Wang (Wuzong) 王賢妃. Consort Wang was never titled guifei in reality. During her lifetime she held the position of a cairen which was a lower rank of imperial concubine than a guifei. She was posthumously honoured as yinfei by Emperor Xuãnzong, who was in reality moved by Consort Wang's devotion to her husband.
- Ma Yuan Zhi (Lee Kwok Lun) – loosely based on a trusted and powerful eunuch of the same name under the rule of Emperor Xuãzong. The character portrayed by Lee Kwok Lun is a combination of two powerful figures, the eunuch Ma Yuan Zhi and military statesman Ma Zhi, who were known dually as the "Two Mas".
- Chancellor Li Deyu (Lau Dan) – based on Chancellor Li Deyu.

=== Historical facts ===
- Empress Dowager or Grand Empress Dowager Guo was resented by Concubine Dowager (later Empress Dowager) Zheng. The two women were rivals for a long period of time, especially after the ascension of the latter's son Emperor Xuãnxong. The Grand Empress Dowager was disrespected by Empress Dowager Zheng and Lee Yi to such an extent that she really attempted suicide by throwing herself off the tower.
- Grand Empress Dowager Guo tried to commit suicide as she failed to demand respect from Emperor Xuānzong and Empress Dowager Zheng. She tried to jump from the Qinzheng Tower, but failed. That night, she died, though the cause of her death remains a mystery. It is suspected that Emperor Xuãnzong hashed her put to death.
- Consort Wang was in the rank of cairen instead of guifei during her lifetime as her family was neither prominent nor noble. It was only after her death that she was elevated to the rank of yinfei. It is traditionally held that Consort Wang and her husband were truly in love with each other.
- Instead of being sentenced to death by Empress Dowager Guo, in history she committed suicide because she was saddened by the death of her spouse. This moved even the jealous concubines who resented the devotion she had from her husband, and even Emperor Xuãnzong himself.
- Li Yi is believed to have sought refuge at a Taoist monastery at some point, though this is not a confirmed historical fact.
- Li Yi was thought to have had low intelligence and confidence before he ascended to the throne. However, after his ascension he revealed extraordinary abilities as a political leader.
- Emperor Wuzong did suffer during the latter part of his reign in health due to alchemists' pills. In the series, he was given a pill by the fictional huifei who thought it would be of benefit to him. Many of the Tang Emperors actually believed in the purported health benefits of these pills, though modern scientific evidence reveals that these pills were toxic.
- Emperor Wuzong was killed by ambitious powerful eunuchs that held immense power at the latter part of the Tang Dynasty, which was already nearing its end during the time setting of the series. The eunuchs in the series killed him to place Li Yi on the throne because they thought that he would be easy to control, as the Prince of Guang put on a facade.
- The Imperial Household Bureau was one of the six Imperial Bureaus of the Tang dynasty.
- The series is set during the latter years of the Tang Dynasty, around about half a century before the Tang Dynasty's end. The Tang Empire at this time was controlled by powerful, ambitious, corrupt eunuchs, and the Tang Emperors gradually lost more and more power to them. The Tang Dynasty reached its peak in culture and power during the reign of Emperor Xuānzong's ancestor Emperor Xuanzong's reign, before it was sent into decline by the An Shi Rebellion during Xuanzong's reign. Emperor Xuānzong was an Emperor during the decline of the Tang Empire, and he was the last strong ruler of the Tang Dynasty.
- In the television drama, Taoism appears as the initially as the religion and accepted philosophy of the imperial family and imperial government. However, after Li Yi comes to the throne, Buddhism and Buddhist philosophy is discussed by the characters in their dialogue, and Buddhist worship took the place of Taoist worship. Emperor Xuānzong revived Buddhist worship that was unsupported by the few Emperors before him. Buddhism flourished under the Tang Empire, and it was during this golden age in Chinese history that the system of adapting to the three schools of Confucianism, Taoism and Chinese Buddhism was solidified for the first time. This ideology of adapting to the philosophies of all three would last for millennia. Confucianism was promoted primarily for its appreciation of various virtues, including collectivist ideals of family units and interdependence between the people and units of the state. Taoism was promoted for its appreciation of nature, balance and moderation in all things, as opposed to the Legalist ideals of Ancient, feudal China. Buddhism was imported as an Indian faith and remains hugely popular from the Tang Dynasty.
- In history Empress Dowager Zheng outlived Li Yi and saw her grandson Emperor Yizong of Tang ascend the throne as a grand empress dowager. As the eldest son of Li Yi, in fact, Yizong was born 14 years before Li Yi's ascension But all through the series, Li Yi is seen as childless. In the series, Empress Dowager Zheng is portrayed more sympathetically in a tilt towards the rights of the working class than the picture of a resentful and socially ambitious empress dowager drawn by historians. Historians often view Empress Dowager Guo with sympathy in contrast, as a woman who was born into nobility.

== Production ==
=== Development ===
Since the successful Korean blockbuster drama, Jewel in the Palace, reached a final peak 50 rating points, and topped the chart in Hong Kong in 2005, Hong Kong had been waiting for another breathtaking production to the likes of Jewel in the Palace. After in 2004, the highly successful TVB drama series War and Beauty gripped a huge audience and gained excellent ratings. Producer Mui Siu Ching, who is highly familiar to this type of darker plot, with her experiences in dramas such as Forensic Heroes and The Brink of Law, moved straight to commission this drama production which genre to costume series revolving around the conflicts and struggle within the inner palace. In late 2008, a trailer was released at TVB's sales presentation. A costume fitting took place on 17 February 2009. The series was originally planned to start filming in December 2008, but executives felt it had potential to be a grand production and pushed filming to February 2009 with the script modified from the original 25 episodes to 33 and new costumes were designed specifically for the series.

The original working title known as Palace Schemes linked the story to scheming hearts of women in the royal palace. Although its Chinese title kept on the same meaning, the English title was changed to Beyond the Realm of Conscience. When initial script was first submitted, it was temporarily called Lau Sam Ho, representing Charmaine Sheh's character. 50% of the storyline from the sales presentation trailer was changed. It yielded the some development in casting, costume, setting, character and screenplay as well.

=== Casting ===
Charmaine Sheh was cast as the protagonist. Two previous TVB award-winning actors, Moses Chan and Kevin Cheng are also featured. TVB Best Supporting Actress 2008 winner Tavia Yeung portrays her first villainous role, which was also the most challenging role she has taken on for the past 10 years. Other experienced actresses starring alongside her also played famous villainous roles including Susanna Kwan (villain in Heart of Greed), Michelle Yim (villain in Moonlight Resonance) Susan Tse (villain in Rosy Business). Selena Li was cast as Mun Bou Yin to motivate younger audiences. Christine Ng and Fala Chen, who were featured in the trailer were replaced by Kara Wai and Yoyo Chen due to scheduling conflicts.

=== Location and costume ===
The series was only filmed in Hong Kong, unlike 2003's costume drama War and Beauty. The outdoor scenes were filmed in local parks and within TVB City. High rise buildings that surrounded the parks were removed in post production.

Sheh's character had 17 image and 30 set of custom-made costumes. Cheng's wig with middle parting was made by the same master who crafted Tony Leung's wig in Red Cliff while Chan's emperor wig was specially created with braided pattern. The wigs were heavy and the female cast needed to keep some painkillers handy during the costume fitting. As the height of the wig represents social status, Susan Tse who played the Empress had the tallest wig, taking 3 hours to prepare for makeup and setting hairstyle. Yeung pointed out that the female cast in the series suffer from neck and shoulder pains, "The head ornaments are too heavy. So, by the time we finish filming the series, everyone will probably suffer from cervical vertebrae inflammation (swelling)! As soon as the head ornament goes on, our necks already have problems. Right now, my neck and shoulders are swollen. I have to apply ointment on them every night."

250 sets of costumes were made representing the 4 departments in the palace; embroidery department used lilies and the pink color, jewelry department used peonies and the blue color, food department used chrysanthemums and the orange color, and upholstery department used lotus and the green color.

== Format ==
The series is in a miniseries format, typical throughout East Asia. It revolves around palace scheming, which has been featured in numerous TVB television series before Beyond the Realm of Conscience and also beyond Hong Kong, China and Taiwan in dramas from Korea and other East Asian countries. These series were originally made popular by War and Beauty, also produced by TVB in 2004 and also as an anniversary grand production. However, this series is different in that carries the typical message that good (Lau Sam Ho, Charmaine Sheh) always beats evil (Yiu Kam Ling, Tavia Yeung). War and Beauty depicts the lives of four imperial concubines who all scheme to rise.

== Reception ==
Initial audience anticipation of the series before airing was mostly positive, reported as being a highly anticipated drama following its sales presentation. Some audience also looked forward to Tavia Yeung being cast as a villain for the first time. Some viewers also criticised Charmaine Sheh's character of "Lau Sam Ho" as being "too perfect" and unrealistic.

Tavia Yeung's acting skills initially received criticism from viewers saying that she was not "evil" enough for her role as "Yiu Gam Ling" but by the end of the series, she won praise. Sheh also received praise for her acting, in particular in the final episode. The series also received acclaim from critics for its elaborate costumes and plot.

The comparison of the series to TVB's 2004 War and Beauty received much retaliation from fans. The plotting and scheming of the characters in Beyond the Realm of Conscience was repeatedly inferior to that of War and Beauty. Others argued that the series was superior in portraying the vulnerability of those less powerful. Sheh and Chan who starred in both series, defended the popularity of both series.

Ratings wise the drama performed extremely well from the start. The first episode received an index rating of 34 points (2.14 million viewers) and peaking at 36 points (2.29 million viewers), breaking TVB's 2003 record for a first episode. The second week of the series was better received, with a peak of 41 points for episode 6. It maintained a steady progress in subsequent weeks. Sheh hoped that Beyond the Realm of Conscience, would break Korean drama Jewel in the Palace's record. For the final episode the series managed to receive 50 points for the scene in which the characters of Sam Ho and Ko Hin Yeung were reunited. The drama attracted 1% more viewers, with 98% of viewers against the formers's 97%, pleased both drama's producer and cast, and meant that Beyond the Realm of Conscience finished as TVB's most viewed series in 2009.

== Accolades ==
=== 42nd TVB Anniversary Awards (2009) ===
Nominees	Accolades	Results
Tavia Yeung	My Favourite Female Character	Won
Tavia Yeung	Best Performance of the Year	Won
Tavia Yeung	Best Actress	Top 5
Charmaine Sheh	Best Actress	Top 5
Charmaine Sheh	My Favourite Female Character	Top 5
	Best Drama	Top 5
Michelle Yim	Best Supporting Actress	Top 5
Susanna Kwan	Best Supporting Actress	Nominated
Moses Chan	Best Actor	Top 5
Kevin Cheung	My Favourite Male Character	Top 5
Lee Kwok Lun	Best Supporting Actor	Top 5
Ram Chiang	Best Supporting Actor	Nominated
Mary Hon	Best Supporting Actress	Top 5
Susan Tse	Best Supporting Actress	Top 5

=== Asian Television Awards (2010) ===
Nominees	Accolades	Results
Susan Tse	Best Drama Performance by an Actress in a Supporting Role	Won

=== 42nd Ming Pao Anniversary Awards 2010 ===
Nominees	Accolades	Results
Charmaine Sheh	Outstanding Actress in Television	Top 5
Michelle Yim	Outstanding Actress in Television	Top 5
Susanna Kwan	Outstanding Actress in Television	Top 5
Tavia Yeung	Outstanding Actress in Television	Top 5

== Viewership ratings ==
	Week	Episodes	Average Points	Peaking Points	References
1	19–23 October 2009	1 – 5	33	35	
2	26–30 October 2009	6 – 10	35	40	
3	2–6 November 2009	11 – 15	35	38	
4	9–13 November 2009	16 – 20	35	39	
5	16–20 November 2009	21 – 24	35	38	
6	23–27 November 2009	25 – 29	35	—	
6	28 November 2009	30 – 31	36	—	
6	29 November 2009	32 – 33	46	50	

== International broadcast ==
Region	Network	Notes
Malaysia	TV2 & 8TV	Dubbed in Mandrian (Mandarin Dubbed and Malay subtitles on TV2)
Thailand	Channel 3	Dubbed in Thai
Singapore	Channel U	Dubbed in Mandrian
Singapore	VV Drama	Dubbed in Mandrian

== See also ==
- Deep in the Realm of Conscience
- Can't Buy Me Love
