= Deep in the Realm of Conscience =

- Official poster
- Also known as: Beyond the Realm of Conscience 2
- 宮心計2:深宮計
- Genre: Costume drama Period drama
- Directed by: Zhu Li He; Ben Fong
- Starring: Nancy Wu; Annie Liu; Steven Ma; Kenneth Ma; Edwin Siu; Jacqueline Wong; Alice Chan
- Opening theme: "無悔無愧" performed by Nancy Wu
- Ending theme: "明月與海" performed by Steven Ma & Nancy Wu "飛蛾撲火" performed by Hana Kuk
- Composer: Alan Cheung
- Country of origin: Hong Kong
- Original languages: Cantonese; Mandarin
- No. of episodes: 36

Production
- Executive producer: Mui Siu-ching
- Producers: Mui Siu-ching; Ben Fong
- Production locations: Hong Kong; Hengdian World Studios
- Running time: 42 – 45 minutes
- Production companies: TVB; Tengent Penguin Pictures

Original release
- Network: TVB Jade; Tencent Video
- Release: 21 May – 8 July 2018

Related
- Beyond the Realm of Conscience (2009) Can't Buy Me Love (2010)

Deep in the Realm of Conscience (Chinese: 宮心計2: 深宮計; Cantonese Yale: Gūngsāmgai2: Sāmgūnggai) is a 2018 Hong Kong television series produced by TVB, Tengent Penguin Pictures and by producer Mui Siu-ching. It is the sequel to the 2009 drama Beyond the Realm of Conscience. The drama aired five days a week on the TVB network with 45-minute episodes starting May 21, 2018. It stars Nancy Wu, Annie Liu, Steven Ma, Kenneth Ma, Edwin Siu, Jacqueline Wong and Alice Chan in this reboot installment.

== Plot ==
During the reign of Emperor Shang of Tang, Prince of Ping (Steven Ma), and Princess Taiping (Alice Chan) stage a coup and execute the Empress Dowager Wei (Michelle Yim) who seized power within the court. They support Prince of Xiang (Lee Lung Kei) in reclaiming the throne. The palace appears to be returning to peace, but, the great waves are secretly approaching. Princess Taiping and Prince of Ping begin to be divided like fire and water. Within the inner palace, Prince of Ping 's first wife, Wong Zhen (Nancy Wu) and favorite concubine Cheng Shunhei (Chrissie Chau) compete with their beauty and cannot get along. Fortunately, within the deceitful inner palace, there is rare integrity. The heroic and righteous imperial guards, Yam Sam-Shu (Kenneth Ma) and Ho Lei (Edwin Siu), and the quiet and elegant department heads, Kam Yeuk-chin (Jacqueline Wong), and Yuen Yuet (Annie Liu), are four genuine people that decorate the gloomy and cold palace halls with a brush of romance and add a little mystery. Some people will give up everything for their most beloved, while others will give up their soul for power. A series of unsolved cases occur in the palace. Within the layers and layers of mystery is a long-kept secret. As it is slowly unraveled, it reveals humanity's deep thirst for power and wealth...

== Synopsis ==
During the reign of Emperor Shang of Tang, Lee Longgei (Steven Ma) and his aunt Princess Taiping (Alice Chan) launch a coup that kills Empress Wai (Michelle Yim), restoring Prince of Xiang, Li Dan (Lee Lung Kei) to his throne. Beneath the palace's facade is an undercurrent of tension. At the Imperial Court, the rivalry between Lee Longgei and Princess Taiping intensifies into a power struggle. Within the palace, there is jealousy and infighting between the head of imperial household bureau, Wong Jun (Nancy Wu), and the emperor's consort. Some people act against their conscience for power, while others give up everything for the sake of their loved ones. The characters of General of the Lungmo Guards, Yam Samshu (Kenneth Ma), Captain of the Lungmo Guards Ho Lei (Edwin Siu), and palace maids Yuen Yuet (Annie Liu) and Kam Yeuk-chin (Jacqueline Wong) add a touch of romance. Deep in the palace, layers of secrets are exposed.

== Cast ==
=== Main cast ===
Cast	Role	Description
Nancy Wu 胡定欣	Wang Zhen 王蓁	Consort of Ping → Crown Princess → Empress Wang; First wife of Emperor Xuanzong of Tang; Found out that she was pregnant in episode 13. In episode 15, she miscarries after an accident, waking up from a nightmare. In episode 18, she found out that she was infertile as a consequence of the miscarriage. Others see her as a good Empress (except for the fact she hasn't been able to have any children), when in reality she is cunning and manipulative, and will eliminate people who are a threat to her. For example, she intentionally disfigures her younger half-sister, leading to her suicide, in order to marry Li Longji. Banished to the "cold palace" by Emperor Xuanzong for life as punishment for her crimes in episode 36; Villain
Annie Liu 劉心悠	Yuen Yuet 元玥	Palace Maid → 玲瓏公主 (Princess Ling Lung); Love interest of Ho Lei; Turned into a Princess episode 20; Nicole Wong plays a young Yuen Yuet. She became a palace maid to search for her older sister, who had stopped sending her letters. Left the palace to be with Ho Lei and away from palace affairs in episode 36.
Steven Ma 馬浚偉	Li Longji 李隆基	Prince of Ping → Crown Prince → Emperor Xuanzong of Tang; Tortured and killed Yuen Yuet's older sister after she was sent by Empress Dowager Wei to bring poisoned soup to Princess Taiping, events that took place before the start of series. Main Villain
Kenneth Ma 馬國明	Yam Sam-shu 任三恕	Ex-boyfriend and former friend of Empress Wang; Imperial guard general Subordinate of Li Longji; Love interest of Kam Yeuk-chin; Left the palace in episode 36
Edwin Siu 蕭正楠	Ho Lei 何離	Imperial guard commander Subordinate of Yam Sam Shu and Li Longji; Joined the Imperial guard to uncover the truth behind the massacre of the orphanage he was raised. Later revealed to be the unknown long lost brother of Li Longji and Li Chengqi who was sent away from the palace after his birth and death of his mother by Lady Cheung, Left the palace to be with Yuen Yuet and away from palace affairs in episode 36; Husband of Gan Wong Shun.
Alice Chan 陳煒	Princess Taiping 太平公主	Aunt of Li Longji / Emperor Xuanzong of Tang who fights for the throne with him, which then leads to a lot of palace scheming and power struggles. Tries to depose Emperor Xuanzong from the throne after many conflicts between them. Committed suicide by hanging herself using a white silk in her palace in episode 36. Villain

=== Supporting cast ===
Cast	Role	Description
Chrissie Chau 周秀娜	Cheng Shunhei 鄭純熙	An imperial concubine of Emperor Xuanzong of Tang; Rival of Empress Wang; Niece of Princess Taiping from her first marriage Found out that she was pregnant on episode 28. In episode 31, she had a miscarriage was indirect cause by Empress Wang's scheme Died in suicide/poison attempt when she tries to poison Empress Wang along with herself in episode 34
Jacqueline Wong 黃心穎	Kam Yeuk-chin 甘若芊	Palace maid Good friend of Yuen Yuet; Love Interest of Yam Sam-syu; Died in episode 33, murdered by Empress Wang when she accidentally found out her evil misdeeds toward Cheng Shunhei.
Susan Tse 謝雪心	Lady Cheung 章尚宮	Head of Palace Proceedings; Supervisor of Lady Tsui, Lady Nam-kung, Lady Wong, and Lady Luk; Retired as Head of Palace Proceedings in episode 36.
Candy Lo 羅霖	Lady Tsui 徐相思	Head of Jewellery; She wears purple. Cousin of Lady Luk; Left the palace in episode 36 with Lady Luk to start their own business.
Akina Hong 康華	Lady Nam-kung 南宮琹	Head of Furnishing. She wears blue. Left the palace in episode 36.
Angie Cheong 張慧儀	Lady Luk 陸碧雲	Head of Attire; She wears orange . Cousin of Lady Tsui; Left the palace in episode 36 with Lady Tsui to start their own business.
Pinky Cheung 張文慈	Lady Wong 汪敏	Head of Food. She wears green. Becoming Head of Palace Proceedings in episode 36.
Lee Lung Kei 李龍基	Emperor Ruizong 唐睿宗	Emperor Ruizong → Taishang Huang; Father of Li Longji / Emperor Xuanzong of Tang and Li Chenqi / Prince of Song; Older Brother of Princess Taiping; Retired from court affairs in episode 36.
Rosanne Lui 呂珊	Wong Fong Mei 王芳媚 Concubine Xian	Consort of Emperor Ruizong → Consort Dowager; Develops mental illness after an attempt on her life, later revealed to be a side effect of being poisoned by Yu Yin. Dies in episode 29
Mary Hon 韩馬利	Chou Yu Yin 周雨嫣 Concubine Shu	Consort of Emperor Ruizong → Consort Dowager; Resentment toward Emperor Ruizong for being abandoned by the royal family along with her daughter who died of illness develop during their exiled. Returned to the palace for revenge. Slowly poison Wong Fong Mei to her death after her assassination attempt. Killed by Emperor Ruizong in self-defense when she tries to assassinate him during her confession about her crimes and reason behind it in episode 31.

=== Guest appearance ===
Cast	Role	Description
Michelle Yim 米雪	Empress Dowager Wei 韋后	Empress Dowager; Second wife of Emperor Zhongzong; She wants to follow the examples of Wu Zetian to seize power. Killed by Li Longji in episode 1 during coup started by him and his Aunt, Princess Taiping; Villain
Eric Li 李天翔	Li Chengqi 李成器	Prince of Song; Older brother of Li Longji / Emperor Xuanzong of Tang; Gave up the chance of becoming Crown prince to his younger brother, Li Longji; Supports Emperor Xuanzong of Tang in trying to stop Princess Taiping's power from growing in the palace court.
Savio Tsang 曾偉權	Mau Yau Kei 武攸暨	Princess Taiping's second and current husband Executed by Emperor Ruizong when he willingly becomes the scapegoat for Princess Taiping's crime of abusing and torturing a palace maid for twenty years for personal reasons in episode 8.
Max Cheung 張達倫	Sit Siu 薛紹	First husband of Princess Taiping; Deceased; Executed twenty years ago for being claim as a conspirer of trying to starting a coup against Wu Zetian.
Mak Ling Ling 麥玲玲	Kam Bat Wun 金畢妧	The Gold Shop owner.
Louise Lee 李司棋	Cheh Fung Yee 車鳳儀	The Lady in charge of the Fishing shack at the lake

== Reception ==
The drama which features a new cast and story was widely compared to its indirect prequel Beyond the Realm of Conscience and received mainly mixed to negative reviews from audiences.

== International broadcast ==
Region	Network	Notes
Malaysia	8TV, TV2	Dubbed in Mandarin (Mandarin Dubbing and Malay Subtitles on TV2)
Singapore	VV Drama	Dubbed With Mandarin
Cambodia	PNN TV	Dubbed With Khmer
USA	Disney Channel	Dubbed with English
Indonesia	RCTI	Dubbed with Bahasa Indonesia

== Awards and nominations ==
=== TVB Anniversary Awards 2018 ===
TVB Anniversary Awards 16 December 2018	Nominees	Results
Best Drama	—N/a	Nominated
Best Actor	Kenneth Ma	Nominated
Best Actor	Edwin Siu	Nominated
Best Actress	Nancy Wu	Nominated
Best Actress	Alice Chan	Nominated
Best Supporting Actor	Wai Ka Hung	Nominated
Best Supporting Actress	Jacqueline Wong	Nominated
Best Supporting Actress	Susan Tse	Nominated
Best Supporting Actress	Akina Hong	Nominated
Most Popular Female Character	Nancy Wu	Nominated
Most Popular Female Character	Alice Chan	Won
Best Theme Song	無悔無愧 by Nancy Wu	Nominated

=== TVB Anniversary Gala 2018 ===
TVB Anniversary Gala 20 November 2018	Nominees	Results
My TVB Favourite Actor (Singapore)	Steven Ma	Nominated
My TVB Favourite Actor (Singapore)	Kenneth Ma	Nominated
My TVB Favourite Actress (Singapore)	Nancy Wu	Nominated
My TVB Favourite Actress (Singapore)	Alice Chan	Nominated
My TVB Favourite Actor (Malaysia)	Steven Ma	Nominated
My TVB Favourite Actor (Malaysia)	Kenneth Ma	Nominated
My TVB Favourite Actress (Malaysia)	Nancy Wu	Nominated
My TVB Favourite Actress (Malaysia)	Alice Chan	Nominated

=== Golden Melody Award for Song of the Year ===
Golden Melody Award for Song of the Year	Nominees	Results
Jade Music Award	無悔無愧 by Nancy Wu	Won

== See also ==
- Beyond the Realm of Conscience
- Can't Buy Me Love
