= No Return (band) =

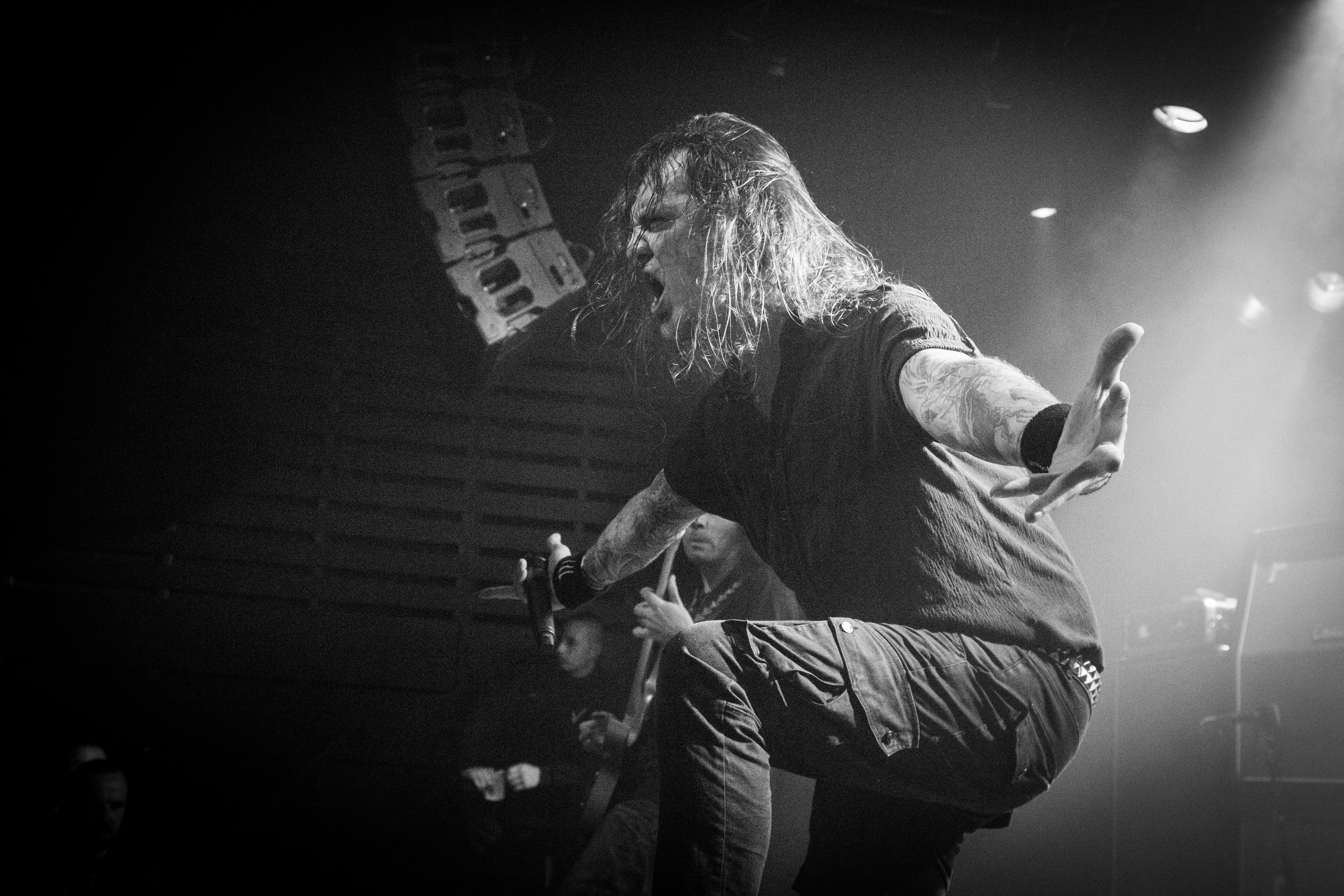
The band live in Eindhoven in 2015

No Return is a French thrash and death metal band. They have released eleven studio albums, some of which on Nuclear Blast and Season of Mist.

Starting in the 1980s, their first release was Psychological Torment in 1990. The band signed on Nuclear Blast to release the album Machinery in 2002. They were later added to the roster of Mighty Music.

== Discography ==
=== Studio albums ===
- Psychological Torment (1990)
- Contamination Rises (1992)
- Seasons of Soul (1995)
- Red Embers (EP, 1997
- Self Mutilation (2000)
- Machinery (2002)
- No Return (2006)
- Manipulated Mind (2008)
- Inner Madness (2012)
- Fearless Walk to Rise (2015)
- The Curse Within (2017)
- Requiem (2022)

=== Other ===
- Psychological Contamination (2013) – double re-release of Psychological Torment and Contamination Rises
- Live XXX (2020) – live album
