= Rosy Business =

- Official poster

Chinese name
- Traditional Chinese: 巾幗梟雄
- Simplified Chinese: 巾帼枭雄
- Literal meaning: Veiled Heroine, Ruthless Hero
Transcriptions
Standard Mandarin
- Hanyu Pinyin: jīn guó xiāo xióng
Yue: Cantonese
- Jyutping: gan1 gwok3 hiu1 hung4
- Genre: Period drama
- Created by: Lee Tim-sing
- Written by: Cheung Wah-biu; Chan Ching-yee
- Starring: Sheren Tang; Wayne Lai
- Theme music composer: Yip Kai-chung; Tang Chi-wai
- Opening theme: "紅蝴蝶" performed by Ron Ng
- Country of origin: Hong Kong
- Original language: Cantonese
- No. of episodes: 25

Production
- Producer: Lee Tim-sing
- Production location: Hong Kong
- Camera setup: Multi camera
- Running time: 45 minutes
- Production company: TVB

Original release
- Network: Jade
- Release: 27 April – 29 May 2009

Related
- No Regrets (2010); No Reserve (2016); No Return (2024)

Rosy Business
- Title screen
- Traditional Chinese: 巾幗梟雄
- Simplified Chinese: 巾帼枭雄
- Literal meaning: Veiled Heroine, Ruthless Hero
Transcriptions
Standard Mandarin
- Hanyu Pinyin: Jīn Guó Xiāo Xióng
Yue: Cantonese
- Yale Romanization: Gān Gwok Hīu Hùhng
- Jyutping: Gan1 Gwok3 Hiu1 Hung4

Rosy Business (Chinese: 巾幗梟雄; Jyutping: gan1 gwok3 hiu1 hung4) is a 2009 Hong Kong period television drama produced by Lee Tim-sing and TVB. Comprising 25 episodes, it originally aired on the Jade network from 27 April to 29 May 2009. It is the first installment of the Rosy Business franchise. It stars Wayne Lai and Sheren Tang in the 1st installment.

Set in Eastern China during the mid-19th century, Rosy Business follows the mercantile Chiang family, owners of Wuxi's largest rice business Hing Fung Nin. After falling ill, patriarch Chiang Kiu temporarily hands over his leadership to his fourth wife Hong Po-kei, which incurs conflict with his other wives and sons. Meanwhile the impoverished coolie Chai Kau becomes an important figure in assisting Hong Po-kei in protecting the family business from crumbling during the Taiping Rebellion. The script was inspired by the successful Chinese television series The Grand Mansion Gate (Chinese: 大宅門).

The final two episodes were aired back-to-back as a two-hour finale, including a cast interview with Scoop (東張西望). A commercial success, the final week of broadcast peaked at 47 TVRs with 3 million live viewers, becoming the second highest-rated television drama in Hong Kong of 2009. It stars Best Actress winners Sheren Tang, Nancy Wu, and Kara Wai. Rosy Business received twelve TVB Anniversary Award nominations and eight top 5 nominations, winning six of them, becoming the biggest winner of the year. The awards include Best Drama, Best Actress (Sheren Tang), Best Actor (Wayne Lai), Best Supporting Actress (Susan Tse), My Favourite Male Character (Lai), and Most Improved Male Artiste (Ngo Ka-nin). An indirect sequel, No Regrets, was released as a grand production and TVB's anniversary series in 2010.

== Synopsis ==
In the mid-1830s, a natural disaster strikes the city of Nantong, tarnishing most of the city's rice fields. Running out of food supply, city mayor Hong Chi-wing (Wong Wai Leung) decides to use the city's military food supply to feed the people. A few days after the disaster, an official from Beijing arrives to the city to check the military supply, and upon seeing empty trailers, he sentences the Hong family to death. His daughter Hong Po-yin (Sheren Tang) escapes and becomes a maid in Prince Wai's mansion, living under the name Hong Po-kei.

Twenty years later, Po-kei reunites with the rich rice merchant Chiang Kiu (Elliot Ngok) at his manor in Wuxi, whom she was betrothed to before the disaster. Chiang Kiu's wife, Yan Fung-yee (Susan Tse) recognizes Po-kei and reveals her identity to Prince Wai, who was there for a visit. Kiu manages to convince the Prince to free her, and marries Po-kei as his fourth wife. Appreciating Po-kei's wisdom and persistence, he entrusts the business to her, with the reason that his eldest son, Bit-man (Ngo Ka-nin), is not yet ready to succeed him. Hungry for power and eager to keep tradition, Fung-yee attempts to strip Po-kei from power but Po-kei manages to keep the business in good shape. She is impressed with second son Bit-ching's (Ron Ng) intelligence and guides him to become the successor, but her efforts are met with challenges from an employee, Chai Kau (Wayne Lai).

== Cast and characters ==
=== Main ===
- Sheren Tang as Hong Po-kei / Hong Po-yin, an intelligent, selfless and compassionate woman who escapes her family's execution, eventually becoming Chiang Kiu's fourth wife and helps manage the Hing Fung Nin rice business.
  - Angel Chiang as Young Hong Po-kei
- Wayne Lai as Chai Kau, a smart but arrogant and reckless man who becomes Hing Fung Nin's employee. Kau always gets himself into trouble and is vengeful to those who have wronged him but his loyalty to Po-kei changes him.
- Elliot Ngok as Chiang Kiu, owner of Hing Fung Nin, husband to Yan Fung-yee, Pang Giu, Lau Fong and Po-kei and father of Chiang Bit-man, Chiang Bit-chiang and Chiang Bit-mo.
  - Stephen Wong as Young Chiang Kiu
- Susan Tse as Yan Fung-yee, Chiang Kiu's first wife and Bit-man's mother
  - Jess Shum as Young Yan Fung-yee
- Kiki Sheung as Pang Giu, Chiang Kiu's second wife (actually should be third wife) and Bit-mo's mother
  - Josephine Shum as Young Pang Giu
- Kara Hui as Lau Fong, Chiang Kiu's third wife (originally second wife) and Bit-ching's mother
  - Summer Joe as Young Lau Fong
- Ron Ng as Chiang Bit-ching, Chiang Kiu's second eldest son with Lau Fong and later Yau Man's husband
  - Lawrence Ng Lok Wang as Young Chiang Bit-ching
- Ngo Ka-nin as Chiang Bit-man, Chiang Kiu's eldest son with Fung Yee
  - Timothy Ip as Young Chiang Bit-man
- Kelvin Leung as Chiang Bit-mo, Chiang Kiu's youngest son with Pang Giu
  - Cadmus Chan as Young Chiang Bit-mo
- Henry Lee as Pang Hang, Pang Giu's older brother and Bit-mo's uncle
  - Oscar Leung as Young Pang Hang
- Suki Chui as Yau Man, Yuk-hing's daughter and later Bit-ching's wife
- Helen Ma as Ngan Yuk-hing, Yau Man's mother
- Nancy Wu as Suen Hoi-tong, one of Pang Hang's girlfriends and later Chai Kau's concubine

=== Supporting ===
- Suet Nei as Gui Yuk-yu, Chiang Kiu's mother
- Kwok Fung as Prince Wai / Mianyu, Qing Dynasty's Prince Hui of the First Rank
- Chang Yi as Lee Cheung-fat, Hing Fung Nin's manager and Bit-man's godfather
- Ben Wong as Chiu Yat-ming, general of the Taiping Heavenly Kingdom
- Kwan Ching as Sa Tsun Tin, leader of the Sa bandits and later owner of Tsun Tin's Transportation Business
- Cheng Ka Sang as Ma Hung, second leader for the Sa bandits under Sa Tsun Tin
- Bruce Li Hung Kit as Magistrate Lam
- Wong Wai Leung as Hong Chi-Wing, Hong Po-kei's father
- Paul Gare as Doctor Brown

== Episodes ==
| No. | Title | Directed by | Written by | Original release date |
|---|---|---|---|---|
| 1 | "Episode One" | Fong Chun Chiu | Story by : Cheung Wah Biu & Chan Ching Yee; Teleplay by : Mak Sai Lung, Shek Hoi Ting | 27 April 2009 |
Hong Po Kei (Sheren Tang), one of Prince Wai’s (Kwok Fung) chefs, along with other servants are delivering a batch of rice to the city of Wuxi. They encounter hundreds of famished people including Chai Kau (Wayne Lai) who allows Po Kei and the royal guards to leave but orders them to leave the rice. It is revealed 20 years prior, Po Kei, known as Po Yin at the time, was the daughter of Hong Chi Wing, Nantong’s mayor who used the military rice supply to feed the citizens after a natural disaster. Po Kei asks her betrothed, Chiang Kiu (Elliot Ngok), who is the son of a rice merchant to help restock the rice supply before royal officials find out. However, Chiang Kiu does not show and the Hong family is sentenced to death. Po Yin escapes, changes her name to Po Kei and hides at Prince Wai’s residence as a maid and chef. Chiang Kiu now owns his father’s rice business, Hing Fung Nin. Bit Man (Pierre Ngo), his eldest son, hires Chai Kau who has arrived in Wuxi. Po Kei also arrives and encounters Chiang Kiu.
| 2 | "Episode Two" | Fong Chun Chiu | Story by : Cheung Wah Biu & Chan Ching Yee; Teleplay by : Mak Sai Lung, Shek Hoi Ting | 28 April 2009 |
Fung Yee (Susan Tse) recognizes Po Kei and asks Bit Man to notify the authorities. Prince Wai helps Po Kei and she is released. Cheung Kiu and Po Kei get married.
| 3 | "Episode Three" | Fong Chun Chiu | Story by : Cheung Wah Biu & Chan Ching Yee; Teleplay by : Ng Chun Yu | 29 April 2009 |
Bit Man gets the Wuxi residents involved in hitting pots and pans, making enough noise to kill the sparrows eating the harvest. Po Kei objects and explains that this will cause insect swarms. Bit Ching (Ron Ng) encounters mother-daughter frauds, Yau Man (Suki Chui) and Yuk Hing (Helen Ma). Chiang Kiu leaves Wuxi on a business trip. Bit Mo (Kelvin Leung) gets kidnapped.
| 4 | "Episode Four" | Fong Chun Chiu | Story by : Cheung Wah Biu & Chan Ching Yee; Teleplay by : Ng Chun Yu, Mak Sai Lung, Shek Hoi Ting | 30 April 2009 |
Po Kei asks Chai Kau to keep an eye on any suspicious employees at Hing Fung Nin and convinces the Chiang family that paying the ransom will have deadly consequences. Chai Kau lands himself in prison after playing a prank on Pang Hang (Henry Lee). Chiang Kiu returns and wants to pay the ransom.
| 5 | "Episode Five" | Au Yiu Kit | Story by : Cheung Wah Biu & Chan Ching Yee; Teleplay by : Ng Chun Yu, Mak Sai Lung, Shek Hoi Ting | 1 May 2009 |
Po Kei asks Hoi Tong (Nancy Wu) to get Pang Hang to release Chai Kau. Chai Kau falsely announces to the employees that Chiang Kiu will not pay the ransom and Bit Mo is released. Bit Man takes credit for the rescue. Bit Ching rejects a promotion after Fong (Kara Wai) is bullied by Fung Yee and Giu (Kiki Sheung). Po Kei and Bit Ching expose Bit Man’s lies.
| 6 | "Episode Six" | Au Yiu Kit | Story by : Cheung Wah Biu & Chan Ching Yee; Teleplay by : Ng Chun Yu, Mak Sai Lung, Shek Hoi Ting | 4 May 2009 |
Chai Kau gets fired after embarrassing Po Kei at a dinner party but she later rehires him. Pang Hang negotiates with the rice businesses to add their shipment fees. Chai Kau suggests an alternative to transport the rice.
| 7 | "Episode Seven" | Au Yiu Kit | Story by : Cheung Wah Biu & Chan Ching Yee; Teleplay by : Ng Chun Yu, Mak Sai Lung, Shek Hoi Ting | 5 May 2009 |
Chai Kau and Bit Ching go to Yixing to transport rice back to Wuxi but encounter bandits who steal their rice. Chai Kau stays in Yixing to negotiate with the bandits’ leader, Tin (Kwan Ching). Pang Hang injures Po Kei after negotiations fail. Chai Kau successfully convinces Tin to start a shipment business to compete with Pang Hang.
| 8 | "Episode Eight" | Wong Kin Fun | Story by : Cheung Wah Biu & Chan Ching Yee; Teleplay by : Lai Ka Ming | 6 May 2009 |
Po Kei promotes Chai Kau but he is upset that he does not get a bigger promotion. Chiang Kiu and Po Kei bail out Man and Yuk Hing. Chiang Kiu tells his wives that he is leaving Po Kei in charge, as his health deteriorates. Po Kei vows to protect Chai Kau in front of Pang Hang after Chai Kau is injured in an attack. Chiang Kiu falls into a coma.
| 9 | "Episode Nine" | Wong Kin Fun | Story by : Cheung Wah Biu & Chan Ching Yee; Teleplay by : Lai Ka Ming, Mak Sai Lung | 7 May 2009 |
Fung Yee, Bit Man and Giu try to force Po Kei to give them the business assets. Bit Man tries to bribe Chai Kau into betraying Po Kei. However, Chai Kau exposes Bit Man’s bribe to everyone and helps Po Kei.
| 10 | "Episode Ten" | Wong Kin Fun | Story by : Cheung Wah Biu & Chan Ching Yee; Teleplay by : Mak Sai Lung, Shek Hoi Ting | 8 May 2009 |
Bit Man tricks Chai Kau to Hoi Tong’s residence and tells Pang Hang. Po Kei plans to promote Chai Kau to a management position but he goes into hiding after Pang Hang sends his men to kill him. Po Kei protects Chai Kau.
| 11 | "Episode Eleven" | Chan Sheung Kuen | Story by : Cheung Wah Biu & Chan Ching Yee; Teleplay by : Lai Ka Ming, Shek Hoi Ting | 11 May 2009 |
Po Kei negotiates with Pang Hang. Fong and Bit Ching leave with Yuk Hing and Man to their hometown. Chai Kau plans to leave Hing Fung Nin to join Tin’s business, leaving Po Kei with no allies.
| 12 | "Episode Twelve" | Chan Sheung Kuen | Story by : Cheung Wah Biu & Chan Ching Yee; Teleplay by : Mak Sai Lung, Shek Hoi Ting | 13 May 2009 |
Po Kei is worried about a locust swarm. She plans to harvest the grain early despite Fung Yee and Bit Man’s objections. Chai Kau stays to help Po Kei. Fong allows Bit Ching and Man to return to Wuxi to help Po Kei.
| 13 | "Episode Thirteen" | Chan Sheung Kuen | Story by : Cheung Wah Biu & Chan Ching Yee; Teleplay by : Lai Ka Ming, Mak Sai Lung | 14 May 2009 |
The locust swarm hits Wuxi, wiping out all crops. Chiang Kiu wakes from his coma. The city of Wuxi erupts into chaos but Po Kei convinces the residents to stop panic buying. Chai Kau discovers Bit Man notified Pang Hang when he sneaked into Hoi Tong’s residence.
| 14 | "Episode Fourteen" | Au Yiu Kit | Story by : Cheung Wah Biu & Chan Ching Yee; Teleplay by : Lai Ka Ming, Shek Hoi Ting | 15 May 2009 |
Chai Kau sends letters to Pang Hang exposing Bit Man and Hoi Tong’s affair. Pang Hang threatens to destroy Bit Man’s reputation but Po Kei saves him. Chiang Kiu threatens to cut off his relationship with Bit Man.
| 15 | "Episode Fifteen" | Au Yiu Kit | Story by : Cheung Wah Biu & Chan Ching Yee; Teleplay by : Lai Ka Ming, Mak Sai Lung | 18 May 2009 |
Pang Hang kicks out Hoi Tong. Chiang Kiu brings Fong back to Wuxi. Giu accompanies Bit Mo to Hangzhou. Bit Man hires assassins to kill Chai Kau.
| 16 | "Episode Sixteen" | Au Yiu Kit | Story by : Cheung Wah Biu & Chan Ching Yee; Teleplay by : Lai Ka Ming, Shek Hoi Ting | 19 May 2009 |
Chai Kau asks Hoi Tong to be his concubine to give her status after seeing her bullied by Pang Hang. Chiang Kiu writes two wills and gives them to Prince Wai. The assassins reveal to Chai Kau that Bit Man hired them and stabs him. The Chiang family find out Hangzhou is under attack by the Taiping Heavenly Kingdom and sends people to save Giu and Bit Mo. Hoi Tong notifies Po Kei that Chai Kau is missing.
| 17 | "Episode Seventeen" | Wong Kin Fun | Story by : Cheung Wah Biu & Chan Ching Yee; Teleplay by : Ng Chun Yu, Mak Sai Lung | 20 May 2009 |
Tin and Hoi Tong suspect Pang Hang for Chai Kau’s disappearance but Po Kei suspects Bit Man. Bit Ching finds Bit Man paying the assassins. Bit Man overhears Yuk Hing and Man suspecting his involvement in Chai Kau’s murder and accuses them.
| 18 | "Episode Eighteen" | Wong Kin Fun | Story by : Cheung Wah Biu & Chan Ching Yee; Teleplay by : Lai Ka Ming, Shek Hoi Ting | 21 May 2009 |
Chai Kau is revealed to be alive after being rescued by a local fisherman. Bit Ching and Man get married. Bit Mo returns and reveals that Giu was killed in an explosion. Chiang Kiu dies. Fung Yee and Bit Man falsely claim that Chiang Kiu has given the business and most of his inheritance to Bit Man.
| 19 | "Episode Nineteen" | Wong Kin Fun | Story by : Cheung Wah Biu & Chan Ching Yee; Teleplay by : Lai Ka Ming, Mak Sai Lung | 22 May 2009 |
Prince Wai arrives with Chiang Kiu’s two wills. Po Kei announces that Bit Man is responsible for Chai Kau’s murder and opens the second will to reveal that Bit Man will not get any of the inheritance. Bit Man is arrested but is released after Fung Yee bribes the magistrate. Chai Kau tells Po Kei that he plans to take revenge. Po Kei warns Bit Man.
| 20 | "Episode Twenty" | Chan Sheung Kuen | Story by : Cheung Wah Biu & Chan Ching Yee; Teleplay by : Lai Ka Ming, Shek Hoi Ting | 25 May 2009 |
Bit Man sets up Chai Kau and severely injures him. Chai Kau blames Po Kei for warning Bit Man. Tin dies and Chai Kau takes his place as business owner. Qing guards desert Wuxi and Chai Kau volunteers his team to protect businesses from looting. The Taiping army wins the battle outside Wuxi.
| 21 | "Episode Twenty-one" | Chan Sheung Kuen | Story by : Cheung Wah Biu & Chan Ching Yee; Teleplay by : Lai Ka Ming, Mak Sai Lung | 26 May 2009 |
Chai Kau breaks into the Chiang residence to kill Bit Man but lets him escape when Fung Yee takes Po Kei hostage. The Taiping army enters Wuxi and the general, Yat Ming (Ben Wong), asks Po Kei for some of their rice supply. Bit Ching and Po Kei are arrested after Bit Ching falls for Fung Yee’s tricks but they are released after Po Kei convinces Yat Ming of a misunderstanding. Fong confronts Fung Yee.
| 22 | "Episode Twenty-two" | Chan Sheung Kuen | Story by : Cheung Wah Biu & Chan Ching Yee; Teleplay by : Ng Chun Yu | 27 May 2009 |
Fung Yee sets up Po Kei. Yat Ming confronts Po Kei thinking she is a Qing Dynasty loyalist. Po Kei is arrested. Chai Kau and Fong worry about Po Kei. Chai Kau exposes Pang Hang’s corruption. Po Kei is released unharmed.
| 23 | "Episode Twenty-three" | Fong Chun Chiu | Story by : Cheung Wah Biu & Chan Ching Yee; Teleplay by : Ng Chun Yu, Mak Sai Lung | 28 May 2009 |
Pang Hang is arrested and punished to serve people with hemoptysis but later escaped. Po Kei and Chai Kau negotiate with Yat Ming to guarantee rice for the Wuxi residents. He agrees but asks them to become Taiping magistrates. The Chiang family finds out Man is pregnant. Yat Ming commits suicide. Po Kei and Chai Kau plan to retreat to Tianjing with the Taiping soldiers but Po Kei gets caught in the battle. Chai Kau turns back to Wuxi to find Po Kei.
| 24 | "Episode Twenty-four" | Fong Chun Chiu | Story by : Cheung Wah Biu & Chan Ching Yee; Teleplay by : Ng Chun Yu, Shek Hoi Ting | 29 May 2009 |
Chai Kau finds Po Kei passed out from a concussion and saves her. The Qing military return and arrest them for being magistrates. Po Kei discovers Chai Kau has hemoptysis. Fong and Yuk Hing go to find Prince Wai to help Po Kei but Fong is killed in an explosion. Prince Wai later returns to Wuxi and uses his remaining power to stop Po Kei and Chai Kau’s execution.
| 25 | "Episode Twenty-five" | Fong Chun Chiu | Story by : Cheung Wah Biu & Chan Ching Yee; Teleplay by : Mak Sai Lung, Shek Hoi Ting | 29 May 2009 |
Chai Kau’s illness worsens. Doctor Brown tells Chai Kau that there is better medication in Shanghai and plans to take him there. Pang Hang convinces Bit Man to burn Hing Fung Nin’s warehouse and rob the Chiang family. Bit Man is killed by the fire as a helpless Fung Yee watches. Pang Hang is arrested again. Hing Fung Nin reopens and Po Kei gives Bit Ching the business assets. Po Kei joins Chai Kau to Shanghai and spends his final two years with him. Later, Po Kei delivers carts of rice to Chai Kau’s hometown and visits the monument the villagers built to commemorate him.

== Production ==
=== Development and casting ===
Before Lee Tim-sing began preparing for a new production, Sheren Tang approached Lee and explained that she wanted to work on a drama with him. Eager to work with Lee, Tang said that she was willing to accommodate her schedules for the new production. Tang also suggested Wayne Lai for the male lead role since she had never worked with him before and was eager to collaborate with him even though Lai had never been cast in a lead role for a TVB series prior to Rosy Business. At the time, Lai was already scheduled in a role in another drama but Lee negotiated with TVB to allow Lai to star in the lead role in Rosy Business. When both Tang's and Lai's scheduling were finalized, Lee began working on the production in early 2008. Along with producing coordinator Cheung Wah-biu, they submitted an initial script to Catherine Tsang, manager of TVB's production department. She was impressed with the script and development for the production formally began in July 2008. Claire Yiu, who was originally cast as Hoi Tong, dropped out of the project due to her pregnancy. Nancy Wu later replaced her. Susan Tse, who had just left rival network ATV and joined TVB, was cast in the project making it her first series with the network. Suet Nei was cast as Elliot Ngok's character's mother, despite Ngok being 3 years her senior.

A press conference and costume fitting for the cast was held on July 25, 2008 with the working title "Red Powder Merchant" (紅粉商人). Filming began August and ended four months later in November 2008 in Hong Kong. Lee explained that the production was temporarily called "Wives and Concubines" (妻妾成群) when the initial script was first submitted, but was later renamed to "Red Powder Merchant." Colleagues criticized the new working title, and Lee later finalized the official title to "Veiled Heroine, Ruthless Hero" (巾幗梟雄) and its official English title to Rosy Business. "Veiled Heroine" (巾幗) represented Tang's role of the fourth wife, while "Ruthless Hero" (梟雄) represented Lai's role 'Chai Kau'. A trailer was release at the sales presentation in December 2008. The drama was also sponsored by Bawang Shampoo.

== Reception ==
=== Broadcast and viewership ===
The drama aired in TVB's main TVB Jade channel for five days a week, from April 27 to May 29, 2009, with a total of 24 episodes. While production planned for 25 episodes, the two final episodes were aired together. A special Scoop watch party celebration, which took place at the Discovery Park Shopping Mall in Tsuen Wan and attended by hundreds including the cast, crew, TVB executives, and fans, aired during commercial breaks with the finale lasting for approximately two hours.

Before the broadcast of grand production anniversary drama Beyond the Realm of Conscience, Rosy Business was 2009's most viewed drama, with an average rating of 33 points (2.1 million viewers) per episode. The finale episode peaked to 47 rating points (3.3 million viewers; 3.4 million including TVB's HDTV sister channel), the second highest in 2009. The highest peak of average ratings in one week reached to 42 points (2.8 million viewers), also the second highest in 2009.

=== Critical reception ===
Rosy Business has received commercial and critical acclaim in Hong Kong. While ratings went to as high as 47 points, critics claim that if the points included the viewers who watched the drama through TVB's HDTV and other sister networks, the rating results may have been comparative to the viewership success of Moonlight Resonance and Korean drama Jewel in the Palace, in which both dramas reached to a rating of 50 points.

The roles of the "fourth wife" and "Chai Kau" propelled both Sheren Tang and Wayne Lai to stardom, particularly Lai who was a lesser known actor prior to Rosy Business' release since he had not yet played the first male lead in a significant series. His character's line "人生有幾多個十年?" meaning "How many decades are in one's life?" became an instant catchphrase in Hong Kong while his character Chai Kau became a recognized icon. The hype around Tang's acting in the series also became a noteworthy topic as many believed she had been snubbed from winning the Best Actress award back in 2004, causing a firestorm online with thousands of netizens threatening to protest in front of TVB City if she did not win the award this time around following rumours that TVB wanted to give Tavia Yeung the Best Actress award since Yeung was under full contract with the network. Yeung announced publicly at the awards show before the award was handed out that if Tang did not win, she would join the protest outside TVB headquarters. Ultimately, Tang and Lai both respectively won the title as Best Actress and Best Actor at the 2009 TVB Anniversary Awards.

The series also won the Best Drama Award over Beyond the Realm of Conscience, the other fan favourite that year. Additionally, the series swept all four MingPao Anniversary Awards: Best Actor for Lai, Best Actress for Tang, Best Programme, and Best Backstage Crew for writers Cheung Wah-biu and Chan Ching-yee.

Rosy Business aired in Mainland China with mixed to positive reviews. Some viewers expressed that the story was similar to The Grand Mansion Gate, despite having a different plot, historical time period, and characters, and claimed that Hong Kong script writers were beginning to lack creativity, having remade a few Mainland dramas already in the past. Despite that, the series still garnered a high rating of 8.7 out of 10 on Chinese website Douban.

Time Out Hong Kong named Rosy Business among the best 17 Hong Kong television dramas of all time.

== Sister productions ==
=== No Regrets ===
Title screen card taken from 2010 TVB Sales Presentation.

After the success of Rosy Business, TVB announced plans to produce a companion piece starring the original cast, slated to begin filming in March 2010. However, Fala Chen and Raymond Wong Ho-yin were cast to replace Kiki Sheung, Ron Ng, and Suki Chui, who were reported to be not taking part in the production due to scheduling conflicts.

Tentatively titled Rosy Business II (巾幗梟雄之義海豪情), a sales presentation trailer of the drama featuring a majority of the original cast was filmed on October 25, 2009 in TVB's filming studio. The three-minute trailer aired on the TVB Jade channel on December 6, 2009 to an overwhelmingly positive reception. 50 random locals were interviewed in the streets, and 58% chose Rosy Business II as their most anticipated drama. Several Mainland China news portals also listed Rosy Business II as one of the top 15 for most anticipating upcoming Hong Kong/Taiwanese dramas.

The reboot will take place during World War II in Guangzhou, approximately 100 years after the events of Rosy Business. Lee explained that Rosy Business II will take a darker route in introducing the main characters, having that Tang will portray a villainous role. While the original did not have Tang and Lai dwell in a romantic relationship, the spin-off will focus on these developments, but it will merely be a side-story to the main plot.

The indirect sequel, released on October 18, 2010 under the title No Regrets, was a huge success with the final episode reaching over 3 million live viewers and an additional 3.7 million views on TVB's online service MyTV, the highest ever in MyTV record. It currently holds a 9.4 rating on the Chinese website Douban, becoming the highest rated Hong Kong drama series of all time.

=== No Reserve ===
After two successful hit series, talks of a third follow up series began to circulate in 2010 and was slated to start filming in April 2012 with the original cast and crew including Lai and Tang. However, the project fell through when writer Cheung Wah Biu left TVB and Lee stated that he is unable to make another without Cheung. After multiple delays, TVB confirmed in September 2012 that the project will begin filming in March 2013 with a new writer and with Myolie Wu cast as the new female lead replacing Sheren Tang after Lee stated that he was unable to create another story with the same two leads. This decision was heavily criticized by the public with fans stating that Tang was irreplaceable and threatening boycott. Most of the supporting cast also left the project due to scheduling conflicts and producers wanting a younger cast.

The series was put in limbo for three years due to content that was deemed too controversial by TVB. It was finally released in 2016 as No Reserve under a low profile and with several episodes cut from television and only released on myTV. It was negatively received with viewership averaging 20 points and a 4.2 out of 10 rating on Douban, a far contrast with both its predecessors.

=== No Return ===
In November 2020, sources stated that a fourth sequel will begin filming in March 2021 with Sheren Tang returning as the female lead. New creator Fong Chun Chiu stated that while there have been talks, nothing had been confirmed. Wayne Lai was asked about the news in December 2020 and said that he hopes to work with Tang again but did not confirm or deny anything. In January 2021, a fan commented on Tang's Weibo that watching No Regrets helped improve their Cantonese listening skills to which Tang replied "Want to improve even more?" seemingly hinting at her involvement in the project. Later, Lai confirmed that Tang has joined the project and that Cheung Wah Biu is returning as screenwriter marking his return to TVB for the first time since working on No Regrets in 2010. Lai also said that production has been delayed due to COVID-19 pandemic travel restrictions.

In late April 2021, it was reported that Rebecca Zhu and Him Law have joined the cast with production set to start in August 2021 in Hengdian. However, as of June 2021, Lai told fans that he does not know when production will begin.

On July 19, 2021, news outlets reported that collaborations with Chinese company Youku had fallen apart after the company read the first 3 episodes of the script. TVB has the script under review but the project may not move forward. It was also reported that Tang had moved on to seeking new projects but Lai later said the project is still in development.

In late August to September 2021, multiple reports claimed the drama will move forward with production set to start in March 2022 but this was never confirmed. On October 18, 2021, Tang hosted a livestream with Lai to celebrate the 11th anniversary of the 2nd instalment No Regrets with over 1.35 million people joining. Tang confirmed that she did have the project in her schedule before but due to some problems, she decided not to talk about it so openly. Recognizing the overwhelming excitement over the potential sequel, they emphasized how much they also want to collaborate again and will try their hardest to make it happen but if they cannot be involved in the end, there will be other opportunities.

On 28 January 2022, Lai said the project is still in progress and he hopes to film at the end of the year.

On 14 March 2022, TVB officially announced the drama as 1 of 4 sequels and 1 of 14 dramas in pre-production at the FILMART event under the Chinese title "巾幗梟雄之懸崖" and English title No Return. The series will reportedly have 30 episodes.

In June 2023, Tencent confirmed that the project was one of 4 in the works in collaboration with TVB, and in August, TVB announced that production is set to begin in October in Hengdian. In September, it was confirmed that Tang will not be returning for the project, with Nancy Wu, who played supporting roles in the first two projects, set to play the female lead while Lai will return as male lead. It was met with immediate backlash on Weibo, with fans stating that it is a completely different project and should not be associated with the franchise. while many fans have already stated that they will not be watching. Tang posted an official statement on her social media and while not referring directly to the project, she said to "trust your intuition" despite "no one being right or wrong", but from a past experience which led to an unpleasant shooting process, "if something doesn't feel right, don't do it". She also stated that she "waited 4 years and was given 3 different schedules; my disappointment is even bigger than the audience" and debunked tabloid reports that her decision was related to salary offer joking that, "If I only took roles because of the amount of money, I would be rich enough to retire". Producer Dave Fong also stated that Tang was asked for the role but both agreed the conditions were not good enough for her to return and backed Tang's statement that the decision was not about pay but many different factors. It was also announced Ron Ng, Pierre Ngo and Evergreen Mak will not return. The only returning cast members will be Susan Tse and Henry Lee from the original two projects and Edwin Siu from the third project. New supporting cast members include Hera Chan, Joey Law, Gabriel Harrison and Lisa Ch'ng.

== Viewership ratings ==
| | Week | Episodes | Average points (peak) | HK viewers (in millions) | References |
|---|---|---|---|---|---|
| 1 | April 27 — May 1, 2009 | 1 — 5 | 28 (30) | 1.78 (1.91) | |
| 2 | May 4 — 8, 2009 | 6 — 10 | 30 (33) | 1.91 (2.10) | |
| 3 | May 11 — 15, 2009 | 11 — 14 | 32 (35) | 2.04 (2.23) | |
| 4 | May 18 — 22, 2009 | 15 — 19 | 35 (39) | 2.23 (2.49) | |
| 5 | May 25 — 28, 2009 | 20 — 23 | 39 (43) | 2.49 (2.74) | |
| 5 | May 29, 2009 | 24 | 42 (47) | 2.68 (3.00) | |
