= No Return (2024 TV series) =

2024 Hong Kong television series

- Also known as: 巾幗梟雄之懸崖
- Genre: Period drama; Revenge; Romance
- Written by: Cheung Wah-biu
- Directed by: Chan Yim-kei; Yu Man-wai; Cheung Wing-fai; Wong Chi-wah
- Starring: Wayne Lai; Nancy Wu; Edwin Siu; Joey Law; Hera Chan
- Opening theme: "Even If the Sky Falls (就算天空塌下來)" by Leo Ku
- Country of origin: Hong Kong
- Original language: Cantonese
- No. of episodes: 25

Production
- Producer: Dave Fong Chun-chiu
- Production location: Hengdian World Studios
- Running time: 43 minutes
- Production companies: TVB; Tencent Video

Original release
- Network: TVB Jade; myTV Super; Tencent Video
- Release: 21 October – 22 November 2024

Related
- Rosy Business; No Regrets; No Reserve

No Return (Chinese: 巾幗梟雄之懸崖; lit. 'Veiled Heroine Ruthless Hero: The Precipice') is a Hong Kong period television drama series produced by TVB in collaboration with the mainland Chinese streaming platform Tencent Video, with Dave Fong as producer and Cheung Wah-biu as script supervisor. Starring Wayne Lai, Nancy Wu, Edwin Siu, Joey Law, and Hera Chan, the 25-episode series premiered on TVB Jade and Tencent Video on 21 October 2024. It is the fourth installment of the Rosy Business franchise. Set in Shanghai between the 1920s and 1940s, it follows a businesswoman and her assistant as they navigate a complex love story amid personal, social, and professional challenges, exploring themes of morality, love, and resilience in turbulent times.

== Cast and characters ==
=== Main characters ===
- Wayne Lai as Chai Shap-chat, a capable but repeatedly unsuccessful businessman who later becomes a trusted advisor to Tang Kwai-sim; prideful, often offending others, and rarely speaking politely. The character's name, which means Seventeen, is derived from the 17th Hexagram of the I Ching, symbolizing the ability to "overcome difficulties, gain support from benefactors, seize opportunities, and achieve success." Lai described Shap-chat as "more complex and unpredictable than his previous roles" in the franchise, noting that the character has significant depth and humanity.
- Nancy Wu as Tang Kwai-sim (Seventh Master), a prominent and ruthless businesswoman who inherits Wing Yip Bank from her late father and later forms a partnership with Chai Shap-chat. Wu described Kwai-sim as the most domineering yet vulnerable character she has portrayed. The role required careful study of her motivations and moral boundaries in order to convey actions that are both strategic and emotionally driven. Wu also stated that taking over the lead role from Sheren Tang initially caused stress and self-doubt, but she gradually focused on her performance while managing the pressure of audience expectations.
- Edwin Siu as Tang Kwai-ping / Lam Mau-choi / Lung Sze-ho, portraying multiple personas: a timid and dependent half-brother, a cunning official, and a seemingly innocent yet calculating figure. Producer Dave Fong commended Siu, noting that although he had previously regarded him as somewhere between a singer and an actor, Siu convincingly portrayed all three roles.
- Joey Law as Wai Ho, a skilled underworld assassin who also works as a rickshaw puller, and is protective of those close to him. Law performed most of his action sequences himself.
- Hera Chan as Kwai Fa-heung, a chef, the daughter of a restaurant owner, and a childhood friend of Chai Shap-chat, who seeks to guide Wai Ho away from the underworld. Chan deliberately wore light makeup to reflect the subtlety of her role.

=== Supporting characters ===
- Celina Harto as Ning Lai, a bold yet gentle and loyal underworld woman who harbors feelings for Wai Ho. Harto experimented with different interpretations of the role to convey the character's subtle manipulations.
- Gabriel Harrison as Tang Kwai-sun (Second Master), Kwai-sim's elder brother, who frequently comes into personal and professional conflict with her.
- Yen To as Chai Man-yi, Shap-chat's father and a skilled and compassionate TCM physician.
- Lisa Ch'ng as Fong Yi, Kwai-sim's loyal subordinate and trusted assistant, who shares a sisterlike bond with her. Her character's distinctive hairstyle, featuring bold bangs, was inspired by 1920s–30s department store window mannequins.
- Sam Tsang as Lung Chun-tong, a ruthless and manipulative warlord and one of the story's antagonists.
- Lee Shing-cheong as Kwai Ting-fung, the father of Kwai Fa-heung and owner of the Kwai-heung Restaurant.
- Mary Hon as Chow Gee-ning, the mother of Fa-heung.
- Albert Cheung as Ngok Cheung-ling (Third Master), a tycoon featured prominently in Kwai-sim's storyline.
- Pat Poon as Luk Wing (Ninth Master), a tycoon featured prominently in Kwai-sim's storyline.
- Rosanne Lui as Sze Wai-nga, the mother of Kwai-sim.
- Willie Lau as Tang Wing-so, the deceased father of Kwai-sim.
- Akina Hong as Ms. Tai-hung, an influential business figure in Hangzhou who eventually becomes Kwai‑sim's close friend.

== Plot ==
Spanning from the 1920s to the post-World War II 1940s, Tang Kwai-sim, the only female tycoon among Shanghai's leading businessmen, struggles to maintain control of Wing Yip Bank amid financial instability, internal opposition, and rival tycoons. Chai Shap-chat, a debt-ridden yet perceptive businessman, offers his assistance in exchange for the cancellation of his debts and becomes her subordinate. While managing the bank, the two frequently clash over values, with Shap-chat emphasizing ethics and Kwai-sim adopting a pragmatic, results-driven approach.

Meanwhile, Kwai Fa-heung, the daughter of a restaurant owner, reunites with her childhood friend Wai Ho, who has become involved in the underworld. Despite the dangers of his violent lifestyle, their relationship develops, and Wai Ho eventually leaves the underworld to build a life with Fa-heung.

Kwai-sim is kidnapped by her stepbrother Tang Kwai-bing, who is presumed dead following her rescue. He later reappears under the alias Lam Mau-choi, a government official investigating Wing Yip Bank. Mau-choi seeks revenge for grievances tied to Kwai-sim's deceased father, manipulating events against her and Shap-chat, including attempt on their lives. He is eventually killed, but his schemes continue when a mysterious figure assumes the identity of Lung Sze-hoi. The impostor using the Sze-hoi identity is Kwai-bing's twin brother, separated from the Tang family and raised in poverty. Assuming this identity, he orchestrates further revenge—framing Wai Ho, attempting to undermine Wing Yip Bank, and targeting Kwai-sim's family—but is ultimately stopped before he can force Kwai-sim to commit suicide.

Amid the wartime chaos, the group relocates to Hong Kong. Wai Ho and Fa-heung marry, and their child—temporarily lost during the unrest—is eventually recovered. Kwai-sim develops progressive memory loss and relies on written records to retain knowledge of her personal affairs, while Shap-chat remains by her side throughout. Over the course of the series, their professional partnership deepens, gradually evolving into a lasting romantic bond that supports her through numerous personal and professional challenges.

== Production ==
The series was produced by Dave Fong, with Cheung Wah‑biu serving as script supervisor and a team of rotating directors. It marked the return of Cheung Wah‑biu, who had also served as script supervisor on the first two installments—Rosy Business (2009) and No Regrets (2010). Sheren Tang was initially reported to reprise her role alongside Wayne Lai but withdrew due to production delays, unsuccessful negotiations, and personal considerations. Principal photography took place from 7 October to 17 December 2023, with over 400 scenes filmed at the Dream Bund backlot of Hengdian World Studios, a full-scale (1:1) recreation of Old Shanghai's streets and architecture. Wayne Lai and Nancy Wu noted that filming in Hengdian provided more detailed sets, more realistic settings, and greater spatial flexibility compared with TVB studios. The production scheduled was intensive, with filming conducted on a daily basis.

Within the Rosy Business franchise, Cheung Wah‑biu used No Return to further explore themes of unrealized love and the complex emotional conflicts between the protagonists. Whereas earlier installments often framed obstacles around marriage and rigid social hierarchies, Cheung granted the leads greater personal agency, leaving social status as the primary constraint. Producer Dave Fong stated that this adjustment served to heighten the series' romantic elements. The series marked the eighth collaboration between Wayne Lai and Nancy Wu, with Wu crediting Lai for helping her polish her performance.

Costumes were designed by art director and costume designer Lau Sai-wan. Nancy Wu wore over 30 "old Shanghai female power" outfits featuring 1930s upper-class hat styles, Wayne Lai portrayed a Shanghai business elite in structured, detailed tailoring, and Hera Chan's Kwai Fa‑heung wore costumes accented with floral motifs reflecting her name, which means Osmanthus. The designs blended Chinese and Western influences, with many costumes produced simultaneously during filming.

The series features extended, dialogue-heavy scenes and includes a large-scale, three-minute gunfight sequence involving nearly 100 actors. Some shots required 20–30 takes, and the entire sequence was filmed over two full days.

== Music ==
Track Listing
No.	Title	Lyrics	Music	Artist(s)	Length
1.	"Even If the Sky Falls (就算天空塌下來)"	Hayes Yeung	Alex Lau	Leo Ku	3:30
2.	"Red Butterfly (紅蝴蝶)"	Eva Chan	Yip Siu-chung; Tang Chi-wai	Wayne Lai; Nancy Wu	3:43

== Ratings and reception ==
Cheung Cho-ming of HK01 praised the relationship between Shap-chat and Kwai-sim for its emotional depth, noting that the series avoids overly sentimental dialogue or intimate scenes, while the restrained performances of both actors convey subtlety and result in a consistently moving portrayal. In contrast, Wang Ying-min of Lianhe Zaobao criticized No Return for weak, illogical storytelling and for failing to live up to the legacy of the Rosy Business franchise, particularly its first two installments. While praising the cast's acting, the review argued that the drama lacks the chemistry and presence of the original lead duo and relies too heavily on the reputation of its predecessors. In mainland China, the drama reached 130 million streaming views. In Hong Kong, the series attracted 1.61 million viewers in its first week, with a slight decline to 1.53 million by the finale.

Week	Episodes	Airing dates	Ratings (Note: According to Hong Kong's TV rating system, each rating point represents approximately 64,670 viewers.)		Ref.
Week	Episodes	Airing dates	Cross-platform peak ratings	Viewership	Ref.
1	1 – 5	21–25 October 2024	24.8 points	1.61 million	
2	6 – 10	28 October–1 November 2024	23.1 points	1.50 million	
3	11 – 15	4–8 November 2024	22.2 points	1.44 million	
4	16 – 20	11–15 November 2024	22.4 points	1.45 million	
5	21 – 25	18–22 December 2022	23.5 points	1.53 million	

== Release ==
The series premiered on both TVB Jade and Tencent Video on 21 October 2024.

== Awards and nominations ==
Year	Award	Category	Nominated work	Results	Ref.
2024	57th TVB Anniversary Awards	Best Television Series	No Return	Nominated	
2024	57th TVB Anniversary Awards	Best Actor	Wayne Lai	Nominated	
2024	57th TVB Anniversary Awards	Best Supporting Actor	Edwin Siu	Nominated	
2024	57th TVB Anniversary Awards	Best Supporting Actress	Hera Chan	Nominated	
2024	57th TVB Anniversary Awards	Best Television Theme song	"Even if The Sky Falls" (by Leo Ku)	Nominated	
