= Susan Tse =

Hong Kong television actress

Susan Tse Suet-sum (謝雪心)
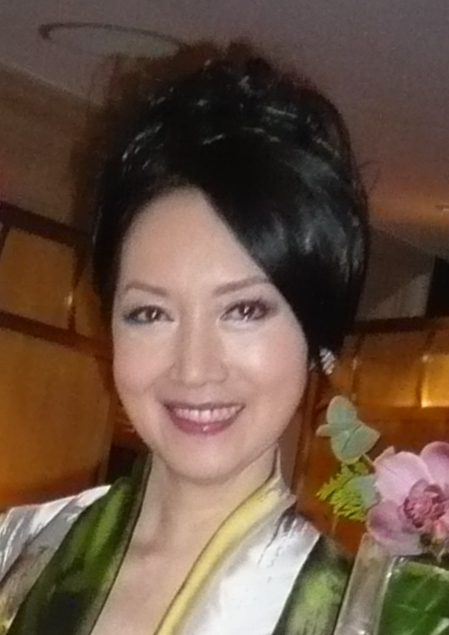
- Tse in March 2010
- Born: Hung Ling-fook (孔令馥); 1 November 1951 (age 74); Hong Kong
- Occupations: Opera singer; television actress; film actress; stage actress
- Years active: 1976–present
- Spouse: Andy Chan Kai-hang
- Children: Karen Chan Ka-wing 珈潁
- Awards: TVB Anniversary Awards – Best Supporting Actress; 2009 Rosy Business Asian Television Awards – Best Supporting Actress; 2010 Beyond the Realm of Conscience

Chinese name
- Traditional Chinese: 謝雪心
- Simplified Chinese: 谢雪心
Transcriptions
Standard Mandarin
- Hanyu Pinyin: Xiè Xuěxīn
- Musical career
- Labels: ATV (1996–2008); TVB (2008–present)
- Website: TseSuetSum.com

Hung Ling-fook (Chinese: 孔令馥, born 1 November 1951), better known as Susan Tse Suet-sum (Chinese: 謝雪心), is a Hong Kong television actress, who started her career in Chinese opera. She is the 76th generation descendant of Confucius. This was confirmed by China's family tree study of Confucius according to her appearance on the TVB show Be My Guest.

== Career ==
Tse participated in the Cross-Harbour Swimming contest at the age of 3. She then became the disciple of Cantonese opera legends Yam and Bak at the age of 11. She later joined ATV in 1996 and then TVB in 2008.

== Filmography ==
=== Television ===
Year	Title	Role	Notes	Ref.
2009	Rosy Business	Yan Fung-yee		
2009	Off Pedder	Helen Chow Fung-yee		
2009	Beyond the Realm of Conscience	Grand Empress Dowager Kwok		
2010	Cupid Stupid	Che Li Gou-fu		
2010	Can't Buy Me Love	Concubine Dowager Chui		
2010	Every Move You Make	Chung Sau-han		
2010	No Regrets	Cheng Long-hei		
2011	Only You	Tang Choi-kiu		
2011–12	Til Love Do Us Lie	Lei Gai-fong		
2012	Daddy Good Deeds	Lam Sam-ling		
2013	Brother's Keeper	Lau Lai-kuen		
2014	Rear Mirror	Gu Suk Yin		
2014	All That Is Bitter Is Sweet	Yu Sou Mui		
2014-15	Noblesse Oblige	Tong Yun-ching		
2015	Madam Cutie On Duty	Wu Dip		
2015	Eye in the Sky	Kwok Hoi-yiu		
2015	Romantic Repertoire	Wan Suet-yim		
2015	Captain of Destiny	Imperial Consort Shun		
2016	Love as a Predatory Affair	Jeana Lo Dou Ching-lok		
2016	Brother's Keeper II	Lau Lai-kuen		
2016	No Reserve	Kam Wan-ling's Nanny		
2017	The Exorcist's Meter	Leung Ching-ching		
2018	Deep in the Realm of Conscience	Lady Cheung		
2018	Life on the Line	Jam Siu Dip		
2019	I Bet Your Pardon			
2020	Forensic Heroes IV	Lee Chau		
2020	The Exorcist’s 2nd Meter	Leung Ching-ching / Yip Wing-shan		
2021	Armed Reaction 2021	Chan Choi-fung		
2021	Hello Misfortune	Yeung Ka-sin		
2023	Speakers of Law	Mary Man Lai-wah		
2023	Unchained Medley	Yu Ming / Fa Kim-chau		
2023	Let Me Take Your Pulse	Lam Hang-wu		

Awards and achievements
TVB Anniversary Awards
Preceded by Tavia Yeung for Moonlight Resonance	Best Supporting Actress; 2009 for Rosy Business	Succeeded by Fala Chen for No Regrets
