= Neighborhood Gourmet =

Hong Kong television series

- Official poster
- 街坊廚神
- Genre: Variety show, Food reality television
- Created by: Hong Kong Television Broadcasts Limited
- Presented by: Kitty Yuen; King Kong Lee
- Narrated by: Judy Lui (Sr. 1 - Present); Ken Wong (Sr. 3 - Present)
- Theme music composer: Yip Siu Chung
- Opening theme: Neighborhood Chef (街坊廚神) by Kitty Yuen & King Kong Lee
- Country of origin: Hong Kong
- Original language: Cantonese
- No. of seasons: 3
- No. of episodes: 65

Production
- Executive producer: Sandy Yu
- Producer: Wong Chung Ho
- Production locations: (Sr.1): Hong Kong (Sr.2): Hong Kong, Macau (Sr.3): Hong Kong, Singapore, Taiwan, South Korea, Malaysia
- Camera setup: Multi camera, Hand-held camera
- Running time: 20 minutes (Sr. 1); 45 minutes (Sr. 2 - Present)
- Production company: TVB

Original release
- Network: TVB Jade, HD Jade
- Release: 3 May 2011

Neighborhood Gourmet (Chinese: 街坊廚神; Jyutping: Gaai1 Fong1 Ceoi4 San1; literally "Neighborhood Chef") is a Hong Kong variety food reality television series produced by TVB, hosted by Kitty Yuen and King Kong Lee. Each episode Yuen and Lee tour a different neighborhood in or around Hong Kong to scope out the most unusual and best food offerings in that neighborhood. Midway through each episode, two new artistes (male and female) tag along with the show's two main hosts to sample food during the viewer recommendation segment of the show. These two new artistes will also assist the host during the end cooking competition segment. Series 1 began broadcast on May 3, 2011, TVB Jade weekdays during its 10:30 to 11:00 pm time slot with a total of 29 episodes. Series 2 began broadcast on November 18, 2012, TVB Jade Sundays during its 8:00 to 9:00 pm timeslot with a total of 18 episodes. Series 3 began broadcast on April 26, 2015, on TVB Jade Sundays suring it 7:35 to 8:30 timeslot with an expected 18 episodes total. This series will be filmed abroad focusing on each countries specialty cuisine instead of neighborhoods, but the shows format will remain the same.

== Format ==
In each episode, hosts Kitty Yuen and King Kong Lee explore a different neighborhood in and around the Hong Kong area, sampling unique food offerings and providing their commentary on the food and the atmosphere of the establishments. They also visit food establishments recommended by viewers through blog messages. Towards the latter half of the show, they visit a local restaurant and meet the chef and owner. During their conversations with the chef, they inquire about the uniqueness of the dishes they have sampled, then select a dish to replicate. The chef provides a brief cooking lesson, and with assistance from their side, both Yuen and Lee compete to see who can best duplicate the chef's dish. The outcome is determined by 10 randomly selected passers-bys who taste both dishes and vote on which they prefer by choosing between Yuen's or Lee's cartoon panel. The one with the most votes wins, and the loser receives a punishment decided by the chef.

Segments:

- Neighborhood introduction - The two host introduce the neighborhood of each episode.
- Street sweep - The hosts food tour around the neighborhood.
- Neighborhood recommendations - The hosts randomly ask locals on the street for good eats recommendations.
- Restaurant spotlight - The owner and chef of a local restaurant shows their best offered dishes.
- PK challenge - The hosts choose a dish from the "Restaurant spotlight" segment to duplicate as their competition dish.
- Choose the winner - 10 Randomly chosen people are asked to taste both teams dishes and choose their favorite. The team with majority points wins.
- Comments from the chef - The chef from the "Restaurant spotlight" segment critiques the loser on why their dish lost.
- Loser's punishment - The loser is given a punishment by the chef of the "Restaurant spotlight" segment.

Series 2, the broadcast time was expanded from 20 minutes to 45 minutes per episode. The segments remained the same as the first series with more restaurants featured and the addition of the celebrity guest segments.

Added segments:

- Celebrity guest - A Hong Kong celebrity introduces their three favorite dishes from three different restaurants in that neighborhood. Both host try all three dishes and choose which is their favorite. They then go the chosen dish restaurant.
- Spotlight on the chosen restaurant - The hosts and the celebrity guest go to the chosen restaurant and are introduced to more food offerings from that restaurant. The hosts try each dish and critiques their comments.

Series 3, the show is filmed partially abroad in the nearby Asian countries of Singapore, Taiwan, Malaysia and South Korean. Each country is featured across a number of episodes, with each episode focusing on a specialty dish from that country instead of neighborhoods. A Hong Kong celebrity tags along with the host in minimal scenes to sample food with them and also serve as the "punisher" during the PK challenge results. The series also finds restaurants of that country's cuisine available in Hong Kong. Both host's are given foreign country assistant's abroad and Hong Kong assistants when they're in Hong Kong. Each episode's final competition sometimes takes place at the country they are visiting and sometimes in Hong Kong at a food establishment that specializes in that country's cuisine.

== Series 1 ==
- Title: Neighborhood Gourmet (街坊廚神)
- Broadcast: May 3 - June 10, 2011

=== Episodes ===
Episode	Broadcast	Neighborhood	Competition dish	Winner	Loser	Punishment
1	May 3, 2011	Kwai Chung	Golden stir fried pumpkin	Kitty Yuen (7 votes)	King Kong (3 votes)	Wash the dirty dishes
2	May 4, 2011	Sham Shui Po	Ginger scallion abalone	King Kong (6 votes)	Kitty Yuen (4 votes)	Serve the restaurant patrons
3	May 5, 2011	Central	Fried chicken wings stuffed with bird's nest	King Kong (6 votes) ^{1}	Kitty Yuen (1 votes)	Remove bean sprout ends
4	May 6, 2011	Mong Kok	Stir fried shrimp in egg whites	Kitty Yuen (7 votes)	King Kong (3 votes)	Pamper the winner
5	May 9, 2011	Wan Chai	Black & white pepper stir fried shrimp	None (Tied 5-5)	None (Tied 5-5)	None; The chef treated both teams to the house dessert
6	May 10, 2011	Tsim Sha Tsui	Three bean turnip cake stir fried crab	Kitty Yuen (7 votes)	King Kong (3 votes)	Un-set the dining area
7	May 11, 2011	To Kwa Wan	Stir fried yak	Kitty Yuen (6 votes)	King Kong (4 votes)	Sweep the restaurant's outside
8	May 12, 2011	Eastern District (Chai Wan & Sai Wan Ho)	Demi-Gods and Semi-Devils fried rice	King Kong (6 votes)	Kitty Yuen (4 votes)	Eat the suffering sandwich
9	May 13, 2011	Kowloon City	Curry clams	None (Tied 5-5)	None (Tied 5-5)	None; The chef treated both teams to Thai desserts
10	May 16, 2011	Tin Hau; Tai Hang	Shrimp stir fried egg in abalone sauce	Kitty Yuen (6 votes) ^{2}	King Kong (1 votes)	Peel onion skins
11	May 17, 2011	Jordan	Rice noodle breaded fried fish balls	Kitty Yuen (8 votes)	King Kong (2 votes)	Remove fish scales
12	May 18, 2011	Tai Kok Tsui	Aloe pig trotter soup	Kitty Yuen (6 votes)	King Kong (4 votes)	Remove pig trotters skin
13	May 19, 2011	Causeway Bay	Shanghai style stir fried rice cakes	King Kong (6 votes)^{1}	Kitty Yuen (3 votes)	None; The chef gifted a scarf to the winner
14	May 20, 2011	Fanling	Yellow wine stir fried chicken	None (Tied 5-5)	None (Tied 5-5)	None; The chef treated both teams to braised pork belly
15	May 23, 2011	Kwun Tong	Boiled youth chicken	None (Tied 5-5)	None (Tied 5-5)	None; The chef instructed exercise to both teams
16	May 24, 2011	Western District	Sweet & sour pork ribs	King Kong (6 votes)^{1}	Kitty Yuen (2 votes)	Choose a crab and gift it to the winner
17	May 25, 2011	Yuen Long	Stuffed crab shells	King Kong (6 votes)^{1}	Kitty Yuen (2 votes)	Measure the eels
18	May 26, 2011	San Po Kong	Matching phoenix (seafood soup)	None (Tied 5-5)	None (Tied 5-5)	None; Eat every dish the restaurant has
19	May 27, 2011	Tsz Wan Shan	Beijing style sweet & sour stuffed squid	Kitty Yuen (8 votes)	King Kong (2 votes)	None; Sing to people
20	May 30, 2011	Shek Kip Mei	Stir fried eel in garlic sauce	Kitty Yuen (6 votes)	King Kong (4 votes)	Help the kitchen prep food
21	May 31, 2011	Shau Kei Wan	Paratha with white curry sauce	Kitty Yuen (7 votes)	King Kong (3 votes)	Work as a waiter
22	June 1, 2011	Hung Hom	Poached salmon in cream oyster sauce	None (Tied 5-5)	None (Tied 5-5)	None; Owner made ice cream in blue berry sauce
23	June 2, 2011	North Point	Red fermented bean curd mixed vegetables	None (Tied 5-5)	None (Tied 5-5)	None; Eat crackers with caviar
24	June 3, 2011	Tai Po ^{3}	Risotto in a portobello mushroom	None (Tied 5-5)	None (Tied 5-5)	None; The chef told both teams to ride a bike
25	June 6, 2011	Sai Kung Town	Handbag (Shrimp pasta wrapped in filo dough)	Kitty Yuen (6 votes)	King Kong (4 votes)	Clean mussel clams
26	June 7, 2011	Happy Valley	Vietnamese sour spicy seafood vermicelli	Kitty Yuen (6 votes)	King Kong (4 votes)	Peel and feed the winners shrimp
27	June 8, 2011	Tseung Kwan O New Town	Scallop & foie gras dumpling in cream sauce	None (Tied 5-5)	None (Tied 5-5)	None; The chef treated both teams to Italian ice
28	June 9, 2011	Central	Eggs Benedict waffle	None (Tied 5-5)	None (Tied 5-5)	None; The chef treated both teams to a smoothie
29	June 10, 2011	Mong Kok ^{4}	Make your own dish Kitty Yuen: Sweet & sour shrimp King Kong: Soy vinegar shrimp	None (Tied 5-5)	None (Tied 5-5)	None; Eat watermelon

^Note 1: King Kong received enough points to win so a total of 10 tasters was not needed.
^Note 2: Kitty Yuen received enough points to win so a total of 10 tasters was not needed.
^Note 3: Episode 24 - Felix Wong was a surprise guest during the street sweep segment since he was at one of the restaurants the crew was filming at.
^Note 4: Episode 29 - Final PK. Bosco Wong and Chrissie Chau served as special guest assistant's.

=== Locations ===
Episode	Neighborhood	Restaurant(s) / Shop(s)	PK challenge restaurant
1	Kwai Chung	Chaozhou Rice Roll (潮式腸粉); Chao Zhuo Lu (潮洲滷); Yen Wo Tong (仁和堂)	Kam Chiu Kitchen (金潮小廚)
2	Sham Shui Po	Hap Jik Tai Small Eats (合益泰小食); Seung Sam Sour Spicy Noodles (傷心酸辣粉); Wo Mei (和味); Kwan Kee Store (坤記糕品專家); San Lung Bakery (生隆餅家)	Tai Chung Wah Restaurant (大中華飯店)
3	Central	Kung Lee (公利); Kowloon Soy Co. Ltd (九龍醬園); Shui Kee (水記); Sing Kee (盛記)	Celebrity Cuisine (名人坊)
4	Mong Kok	Karaage Japanese Fried Food Express (唐揚日式炸物小食店); King of Sheng Jian (正宗上海生煎皇); Kam Wah Cafe (金華冰廳)	Ming Court (明閣)
5	Wan Chai	Car Noodle's Family (車仔麵之家); Happy Cake Shop (快樂餅店); Se Wong Sun (蛇王燊)	Old Bazaar Kitchen (老巴剎廚房)
6	Tsim Sha Tsui	Sue Korean Restaurant (新世界韓式食品); Bak Hau Korean Style Small Eats (北口韓國地道小食); Figo's Burgers (非常意料) - Closed; Fung Kee Egg Waffle (豐記雞蛋仔)	Very Good Restaurant (頂好海鮮酒家)
7	To Kwa Wan	Min Min Inn (麵麵棧); Sun Fu Ying (新富盈); Tsui Po Cuisine (聚寶食軒); Chun Chun Dei (串串地)	Dai Mok (大漠)
8	Eastern District (Chai Wan & Sai Wan Ho)	Flying Dragon Bakery (飛龍餅店); Cheong Lung Restaurant (昌龍清湯腩餐廳); Shun Hing Lou Mei (順興鹵味)	Island East Sport Centre Pool Restaurant (泳池餐廳)
9	Kowloon City	Kung Wo Dou Bun Chong (公和荳品廠); Hoover Cake Shop (豪華餅店); Lanying Indonesia Small Eats (蘭英印尼小食); Thailand Small Eats (泰國小食); Kwai Yue Zai (貴嶼仔)	Mini Bangkok (小曼谷泰國美食)
10	Tin Hau & Tai Hang	Unar Coffee Company; Cafe Y Taberna (穌棧); Saigon Vietnam Restaurant (西貢越南湯河) - Closed	Fu Dong Seafood Restaurant (富東海鮮飯店)
11	Jordan	Shun Tak Chuen Hot Pot Congee (順德村煲仔生滾粥); BBQ Lobster (龍蝦燒); Dimdimsum Dim Sum Specialty Store (點點心有限公司)	Shun De Kung Seafood Restaurant (順德公漁村河鮮酒家)
12	Tai Kok Tsui	Dumpling Shop (餃子店); Tsim Chai Noodle (沾仔記麵食); Bon Bon Cafe (車品品); Ying Kee Noodle (英記油渣麵)	Leung Kee Pork Bone Hot Pot (良記豬骨煲火鍋)
13	Causeway Bay	Burgeroom; New Indonesian Restaurant (印尼美食館); Yu Hot & Sour Noodles (渝酸辣粉); Ying Kee Noodle (英記油渣麵)	Cheung San Art House Private Room Dining (薔生畫室私房菜)
14	Fanling	Kwan Kee Beef Balls & Pork Knuckles (群記牛肉圓豬手); Mr. Yammy (大蕃薯); Hip Heung Bakery (協香麵包西餅); Ying Kee Noodle (英記油渣麵)	Sun Hon Kee (新漢記飯店)
15	Kwun Tong	Yunnan Flavor Restaurant (雲南風味餐廳); Bo Kwong Vegetarian Restaurant (寶光齋素食館); Woo Lo Koon (葫蘆館)	Big Brother Biu's Seafood Restaurant (彪哥海鮮菜館)
16	Western District	Sun Hing Restaurant (新興食家); Ba Yi Restaurant (巴依餐廳); Sam's Kitchen (小息站)	Cheung's Restaurant (張仔美食館)
17	Yuen Long	San Kee Shanxi Knife-Cut Noodles (生記山西刀削麵); Ice Club (綿綿冰甜品屋); Kun Van Kau Food (H.M.) Litmited (港澳冠環球食脯專家有限公司)	Red Kitchen (紅廚)
18	San Po Kong	Yunnan Family Flavor Restaurant (雲南人家風味餐廳); Ying Kee (英記美點小食); Hundred Percent Taste Food Limited (品味十粥); Charcoal Burn Skewer Shop (歎燒串燒專門店)	Tak Lung Restaurant (得龍大飯店)
19	Tsz Wan Shan	Ka Fung Restaurant (嘉豐茶餐廳); Tsz Wan Shan Small Eats Place (慈雲山小食館); Hoi Fuk Tong (海福堂); Yau Kee (大磡村友記車仔麵)	Sam Kee Restaurant (三記飯店)
20	Shek Kip Mei	Hung Fat Sweet Products (鴻發糕品); Hon Fat Noodle House (漢發麵家); Bak San Cookie House (八仙餅家); Tak Fat Restaurant (德發小廚)	Ban Heung Lau (品香樓中西風味餐廳)
21	Shau Kei Wan	On Lee Noodle (安利魚蛋粉麵); Dessert Loma (甜品老媽); Golden Fried Chicken (高登炸雞); Greenness Life Vegetarian Restaurant (青健素食茶餐廳)	Hin Ho Curry Restaurant (恆河咖喱屋)
22	Hung Hom	Luen Kee Chun Wong Jelly (聯記川王涼粉); Si Sun Fast Food (時新快餐店); Little Penang House (檳城小屋); Yu Heung Garden Beef Ball Noodles (郁香園牛丸麵); Ah Fong Shanghai Wonton (阿芳餛飩)	Stanley Deli
23	North Point	Clover Cake & Coffee House (幸福餅店); Mian (壹碗麵); Hong Kong Canteen (香港飯堂); Fook Yuen (福元湯圓)	Hung's Delicacies (阿鴻小吃)
24	Tai Po	Hong Kong Roast (香港燒味); Chan Hon Kee (陳漢記) ^{3} Aloha Dessert House (森泰遠); Kwan Kee (群記清湯腩)	Luca
25	Sai Kung Town	Colour Brown; Gung Chun (貢串); Paisano's Pizzeria; Bibini Ice-cream Gelato	Chef Welly's Kitchen (小城大廚)
26	Happy Valley	Oyster Island (蠔軒); Lotus Garden (蓮園粥麵小廚甜品); Yogo Frozen Yogurt; Dai Siu Ya Cafe (大少爺茶餐廳)	Mekong Riverside Cuisine (湄公河畔法式越南餐廳)
27	Tseung Kwan O New Town	Chung So Private House Desserts (聰嫂私房甜品); Sichuan Skewer Place (捌拾胡同風味烤串店); Grand Restaurant & Pub (金葉軒)	La Piazza Restaurant & Bar
28	Central	Yorkshire Pudding; Scirocco; Daddyos; SohoWay	Green Waffle Diner
29	Mong Kok; Sham Shui Po	Nelson St. Street Market (奶路臣街市); Canton Rd. Street Market (廣東道市)	Tai Chung Wah Restaurant (大中華飯店)

== Series 2 ==
- Title: Neighborhood Gourmet 2 (街坊廚神食四方)
- Broadcast: November 18, 2012 - April 14, 2013

=== Episodes ===
Episode	Broadcast	Neighborhood	Celebrity guest	Competition dish	Winner	Loser	Punishment
1	Nov. 18, 2012	Tsuen Wan	Wayne Lai	Hakka egg omelet roll	Kitty Yuen (8 votes)	King Kong (2 votes)	Wash pig stomachs
2	Nov. 25, 2012	Quarry Bay; Sai Wan Ho	Kandy Wong	Salt stir fry pig air duct	Kitty Yuen (6 votes)	King Kong (4 votes)	Wash pig air duct
3	Dec. 2, 2012	To Kwa Wan; Hung Hom	Stephy Tang	First sauce shrimp	Kitty Yuen (7 votes)	King Kong (3 votes)	Play guitar and sing to patrons
4	Dec. 9, 2012	Jordan; Tseung Kwan O New Town ^{5}	Eric Tsang	Snow mushroom chicken pot	None (Tied 5-5)	None (Tied 5-5)	None; Both teams rewarded with grilled skewers
5	Dec. 16, 2012	Tai Wai	Susanna Kwan	Cuttlefish crab balls	Kitty Yuen (7 votes)	King Kong (3 votes)	Chop pineapples
6	Dec. 23, 2012	Tin Hau; Tai Hang	Michael Tse	Sheltered frog legs	Kitty Yuen (7 votes)	King Kong (3 votes)	Mop the floor
7	Dec. 30, 2012	Tsim Sha Tsui	Mak Ling Ling	Tomato sauced lobster pasta	Kitty Yuen (7 votes)	King Kong (3 votes)	Clean crab shells
8	Jan. 6, 2013	Wan Chai	Alex Fong	Fried lotus cakes	King Kong (6 votes)	Kitty Yuen (4 votes)	Serve dessert to patrons
9	Jan. 27, 2013	Ho Man Tin	Jerry Lamb	Thai stir fried fish	Kitty Yuen (6 votes)	King Kong (4 votes)	De-bone the Hainanese chicken
10	Feb. 3, 2013	Yuen Long	FAMA	Spicy stir fried mince sauce	Kitty Yuen (6 votes)	King Kong (4 votes)	Sing Chinese New Year songs
11	Feb. 17, 2013	Causeway Bay	Elena Kong	Golden egg deep fried potato shreds	Kitty Yuen (9 votes)	King Kong (1 votes)	Eat spicy chicken
12	March 3, 2013	Kowloon City	Chrissie Chau	Deep fried wrap shrimp	Kitty Yuen (7 votes)	King Kong (3 votes)	Wipe the windows
13	March 10, 2013	Tuen Mun	Stephen Au	Steam egg whites king crab	Kitty Yuen (9 votes)	King Kong (1 votes)	Hand write the menu
14	March 17, 2013	Sheung Shui; Fanling	Tracy Ip	Singapore oatmeal shrimp	None (Tied 5-5)	None (Tied 5-5)	None; The chef offered both team food
15	March 24, 2013	Aberdeen	Toby Leung	Deep fried squash with scallop	Kitty Yuen (7 votes)	King Kong (3 votes)	Net seafood from the tank
16	March 31, 2013	Prince Edward	May Chan; Corinna Chamberlain	Deep fried fish skin wrapped shrimp	None (Tied 5-5)	None (Tied 5-5)	None; Both team did not accept reward
17	April 7, 2013	Macau	Shirley Yeung	3 variety steam balls	Kitty Yuen (8 votes)	King Kong (2 votes)	None; The chef rewarded the winner instead
18	April 14, 2013	Macau ^{6}	Evergreen Mak; Nancy Wu	Make your own dish Kitty Yuen: Fried salty fish pork cutlet King Kong: Taiwanese sauteed clams, Sesame oil chicken	King Kong (6 votes)	Kitty Yuen (4 votes)	None; Winner receives a potted plant

^Note 5: Sr.2 episode 4 - King Kong's former Taiwan colleagues (Sasa, Xie Zheng Hao, Aaron Chen, Anthony Guo, Angus Guo, Shanny Tou, Yen Yung Lie) from the TVBS variety show Super Taste (食尚玩家) were special guest on the show since they were in Hong Kong filming their show. King Kong and Kitty Yuen was also featured on Super Taste December 18, 2012 episode.
^Note 6: Sr.2 episode 18 - Evergreen Mak and Nancy Wu also served as assistants during the final PK challenge.

=== Locations ===
Episode	Neighborhood	Restaurant(s) / Shop(s)	Celebrity recommended	PK challenge restaurant
1	Tsuen Wan	Tokyo Station Japanese Restaurant (東京站日式小食餐廳); Suen Bao Wong (蒜爆王); Spicy Lips; Chun Moon Noodles and Snacks (津滿麵點小吃); Yunnan Guizhou & Sichuan Noodle (唯一雲貴川風味); Gala Cafe (嘉樂冰廳); Shanxi Knife-Cut Noodle King (正宗山西刀削麵皇); Duen Kee Chinese Restaurant (端記茶樓)	Wing Tang Chaozhou Marinade Goose (永騰潮州鹵水鵝店)	Sek Tak Happy Restaurant Kitchen (食得喜餐廳小廚)
2	Quarry Bay; Sai Wan Ho	Yo Bago; Mr Taco Truck; Noodle Conspiracy (嘉仁宮); Taverna Del Mar (地中海舍); Tapeo Bar De Tapas y Vino; Chit Chat Oyster & Grill (吹水館); AGE Cuisine Express	Gitone Limited (梓桐堂)	Yi Jiang Nan (憶江南)
3	To Kwa Wan; Hung Hom	Gut Gut Fish Balls (吉吉魚蛋); BBQ Forest (串串森林); Wan Hin Gui (雲軒居); Freshly Brewed Soup Beef Brisket Shop (新仙清湯腩咖喱專門店); Hong Kong Cheung Fun King (香港腸粉皇); Man Mei Chinese Western Pharmacy (萬美中西大藥房); Xiamen Flavor Ah Chu Small Eats Shop (廈門風味阿珠小吃店); In Sa Dong Korean Restaurant (仁沙洞); Waitan Restaurant (外灘飯店)	San Kee Restaurant (生記茶餐廳)	Fu Kup Restaurant (呼吸飯店)
4	Jordan; Tseung Kwan O New Town	Tim Kee French Sandwiches (添記法式三文治); Min Min Shop (麵麵店); San Francisco Western Bakery (三藩市餅店); Yau Yuen Siu Tsui (有緣小敍); TVB Cafe (TVB 餐廳); Gourmet Desserts Cafe (貴花甜糖水甜品專門店)	Ramen Champion	Sichuan Spicy Chicken Hot Pot (川香苑麻辣雞煲火鍋)
5	Tai Wai	Kam Shing Restaurant (金城茶餐廳); Up To You (品記麵食); Hakata Ramen Ryutei (博多拉麵龍亭); Sing Cheung Foods (盛昌美食); Uchi Coffee (屋子生活); Fung Kee Ngan Jia Foods (方記雁姐美食); Shatin Chicken Congee (沙田強記雞粥); Bak Bou Chicken (百寶雞)	Fung Lum Restaurant (楓林小館)	San Cheung Chaozhuo Seafood Restaurant (生昌潮州海鮮酒家)
6	Tin Hau; Tai Hang	J-Dog; Barbecue (巴別橋地道燒烤); Le Gout; Fresh Gourmet; Omerice (生原創); Ramen Kureha (拉麵來)	A La Maison Restaurant & Bar ^{7}	Shek Kee Kitchen (石記廚房)
7	Tsim Sha Tsui	Hokkaido Dairy Farm Milk Restaurant (北海道牧場餐廳); Lan Heung Noodle (蘭香麵家); Ma Lat Yau Wak (麻辣誘惑); Bakery Danish (丹麥餅店); Chuan Po Po (川婆婆麻辣燙); Sun Kee (新記餐廳); Roll; Mandarin Chicken Rice (文華雞飯（新加坡）); Akita Crab Shabu Shabu Specialist (秋田和風蟹宴鍋物料理)	Above & Beyond @ Hotel Icon (天外天@Hotel Icon)	Steak Express
8	Wan Chai	Capital Café (華星冰室); Trusty Congee King (靠得住粥麵小館); Joy Hing Roasted Meat (再興燒臘飯店); Sabah Malaysian Cuisine (莎巴馬來西亞餐廳); Trusty Gourmet (信得過); LA Creperie; The Grill Station (燒房焗) - Closed	Cheung Ting Restaurant (祥正飯店)	Home-made Cuisine (愛吃家常便飯)
9	Ho Man Tin	Tim Ho Wan Dim-Sum Specialists (添好運點心專門店); OCIO Kitchen; Long Kee Noodle Shop (龍記麵家); Kei Heung Cafe (奇香冰室); Hot Dog Link (德國熱狗); Lung Tak Lau (龍德樓); Naruto Ramen Shop (鳴門魚湯麵亭); Wah Yuen Dumpling House (華園餃子館)	Oyster Express	Victory Kitchen (勝利小廚)
10	Yuen Long	Kei O (其奧); Luk Kee (陸記正宗桂林米粉); Tin Hung Restaurant (天鴻燒鵝飯店); Victory Beef Ball (勝利牛丸); Kam Tin Sushi & Sashimi (金田壽司刺身店); Ma Ma's Dumpling )有得餃)	Choy Choy's Kitchen (蔡菜館)	Chun Wo Lau Shanghai Restaurant (春和樓上海菜館)
11	Causeway Bay	Kin Kee Cafe (勤記咖啡); Ling Ling House (韓式本家) ^{8} Lily's Pastry - Homemade Cookies (麗姐私房曲奇); The Match Box (喜喜冰室); Sun Kee Cart Noodles (新記車仔麵); New Century Soybean Foods (時代豆業); Osaka Horumon (大阪好樂滿)	Royal Feast (皇室盛宴)	Yunnan Rainbow (彩雲南)
12	Kowloon City	Wong Ming Kee (黃明記粥粉麵家); Karful Dessert Special Shop (嘉豐點心專門店); Tam's Dynasty (譚點王朝); Golden Thai Restaurant (金泰美食); Chan Chai Koi Choi Shui (陳仔葛菜水龜苓膏專家); May's Cookies (MAY姐曲奇); Big Wife Noodle (大婆牛肉麵); Mrs Hunan (湖南少奶)	Golden Orchid Thai Restaurant (金蘭花泰國菜館)	Lo Sze Restaurant (汕頭澄海老四菜館)
13	Tuen Mun	Sin Bou Eatery (鮮寶食店); Snake King (蛇王輝); Yut Bun Dou Knife-Cut Noodles (一品刀削麵); Menya Musashi (麺屋武蔵); GlobeDESSERT (波記甜品); Nyonya Indocook House (娘惹廚房); Lam Tei Grill	Ting San Wan Hoi Seafood Kitchen (青山灣海鮮小廚)	Food Court (美食坊茶餐廳)
14	Sheung Shui; Fanling	Chan Luk Kee (陳六記飯店); Jan Heung Bakery (珍香餅家); Rainbow Dessert (彩虹甜品屋); Sang Kee (生記); Bik jia Thai Style Dishes (碧姐泰式小炒); Kau Li Heung Restaurant (九里香茶餐廳); Chez Lung (龍記飲食有限公司)	Cafe Je T'aime	Cool Kitchen (清涼廚房)
15	Aberdeen	Thai One (泰一); Veggie Source Restaurant (天之源素食); Yut Gor Soup Noodle King (一哥湯麵皇館); Restaurant Gold Pineapple (金菠蘿); Fat Kee Seafood Restaurant (發記小廚); Nanyang Restaurant (南洋餐廳)	Top Deck at The Jumbo (珍之宝餐廳)	Fish Rice Town (漁米鎮)
16	Prince Edward	Delicious Food (美味食店); Ueno Bakery & Enzyme (上野酵素麵包生活館); Dai Kee (大記攦粉糕點專門店); Lan Yuen Chee Koon (蘭苑饎館); Roadside; Mei Mei Dumpling Shop (美味餃子店); Veggie Mama (素食媽媽)	Bak Lei Hot Pot Seafood Restaurant (百利火鍋海鮮酒家)	Royal Dragon Seafood Cuisine (鉅龍酒家)
17	Macau	Casa de Pasto Seng Choeng (誠昌飯店); Serrdura (沙度娜); Food Court @ Galaxy Macau Resort City (澳門銀河綜合渡假城); Sweet Splendor @ Galaxy Macau Resort City (富貴糖皇@澳門銀河綜合渡假城); Sing Kee Congee (盛記白粥); Taipa Southeast Asian Cuisine (氹仔東南亞美食); Taste Restaurant (品味)	Cafe Nga Tim (雅憩花園餐廳)	Sun Yik Cuisine (新益美食)
18	Macau	Fung Kee Three Cups Pig Trotter Ginger (馮記三盞燈豬腳薑); Restaurante Birmanes Nga Heong (雅馨緬甸餐廳); Yeung Luk Kee (楊六記); Yip Ci Kee (葉熾記勁秋美食); Yau Kee Deagon Beard Candy (祐記龍鬚糖); Chan Kwong Kee Restaurant (陳光記飯店); Lai Kei Ice Cream (禮記雪糕); Red Market (红街市)	Festiva @ Galaxy Macau Resort City (群芳@澳門銀河綜合渡假城)	Cunha Bazaar (官也墟)

^Note 7: Sr.2 episode 6 - Stephen Huynh is part owner of the celebrity recommended restaurant, A La Maison Restaurant & Bar.
^Note 8: Sr.2 episode 11 - Ling Ling House (韓式本家) is owned by former TVB actress and entertainment news correspondent Angel Sung's mother.

== Series 3 ==
- Title: Neighborhood Gourmet 3 (街坊廚神舌戰新台韓)
- Broadcast: April 26, 2015 - August 23, 2015

=== Episodes ===
Episode	Broadcast	Country	Local cuisine	Celebrity guest	Competition dish	Winner	Loser	Punishment
1	April 26, 2015	Singapore	Seafood	Roger Kwok	Curry fish head	None (Tied 5-5)	None (Tied 5-5)	None; Eat durian pudding as reward
2	May 3, 2015	Singapore	Nyonya	Roger Kwok	Black fruit chicken	King Kong (7 votes)	Kitty Yuen (3 votes)	Hand clean the kitchen floor
3	May 10, 2015	Singapore	French	Roger Kwok	French seared fish	Kitty Yuen (7 votes)	King Kong (3 votes)	Wash utensils and pans
4	May 17, 2015	Singapore	Grilled skewers	Roger Kwok	Vegetarian tofu dumplings	King Kong (7 votes)	Kitty Yuen (3 votes)	Peel banana skins
5	May 24, 2015	Singapore	Fujian	Roger Kwok	Prawn stir fried noodles	Kitty Yuen (7 votes)	King Kong (3 votes)	Clean the woks
6	May 31, 2015	Singapore	Drink & dessert	Roger Kwok	Dry curry chicken	None (Tied 5-5)	None (Tied 5-5)	None; The chef cooked whatever the hosts wanted
7	June 7, 2015	Taiwan	Braised Mince Pork Rice	Wong Cho-lam; Leanne Li ( Hong Kong: Alan Tam ep. 8) (Taiwan: Sasa ep. 8, 10, 12)	Three cup braised tofu	King Kong (7 votes)	Kitty Yuen (3 votes)	Take out the garbage
8	June 14, 2015	Taiwan	Hot pot Taiwanese fried chicken ^{9}	Wong Cho-lam; Leanne Li ( Hong Kong: Alan Tam ep. 8) (Taiwan: Sasa ep. 8, 10, 12)	Osmanthus scallops with egg	King Kong (6 votes)	Kitty Yuen (4 votes)	Eat the competing dishes both teams made
9	June 21, 2015	Taiwan	Beef; Hujiao bing	Wong Cho-lam; Leanne Li ( Hong Kong: Alan Tam ep. 8) (Taiwan: Sasa ep. 8, 10, 12)	Scallion pancake beef roll	King Kong (6 votes)	Kitty Yuen (4 votes)	Kiss the winner
10	June 28, 2015	Taiwan	Souvenir; Light food ^{10}	Wong Cho-lam; Leanne Li ( Hong Kong: Alan Tam ep. 8) (Taiwan: Sasa ep. 8, 10, 12)	Five willow fish	King Kong (7 votes)	Kitty Yuen (3 votes)	Clean the cows at the cattle farm
11	July 5, 2015	Taiwan	Snacks; Oyster omelette	Wong Cho-lam; Leanne Li ( Hong Kong: Alan Tam ep. 8) (Taiwan: Sasa ep. 8, 10, 12)	Eel stir fried noodle	Kitty Yuen (6 votes)	King Kong (4 votes)	Finish eating all the food the chef cooked
12	July 12, 2015	Taiwan	Japanese cuisine Xiaolongbao	Wong Cho-lam; Leanne Li ( Hong Kong: Alan Tam ep. 8) (Taiwan: Sasa ep. 8, 10, 12)	Spicy stir fried seaweed	None (Tied 5-5)	None (Tied 5-5)	None; The chef treated both teams to dessert
13	July 19, 2015	South Korea	Seafood; Korean fried chicken	Eric Tsang; Ruco Chan; Kristal Tin	Tanka pepper fish stomach soup	King Kong (7 votes)	Kitty Yuen (3 votes)	Move the new produce shipments
14	July 26, 2015	South Korea	Pojangmacha; Korean barbecue	Eric Tsang; Ruco Chan; Kristal Tin	Bindaetteok (mung bean pancake)	Kitty Yuen (7 votes)	King Kong (3 votes)	Clean the kitchen
15	Aug 2, 2015	South Korea	Soups	Eric Tsang; Ruco Chan; Kristal Tin	Spicy beef vermicelli soup	Kitty Yuen (8 votes)	King Kong (2 votes)	Greet the restaurant customers
16	Aug 9, 2015	South Korea	Noodle soups	Eric Tsang; Ruco Chan; Kristal Tin	Octopus ink Kimbap & Omelette Kimbap	Kitty Yuen (7 votes)	King Kong (3 votes)	Serve the customers
17	Aug 16, 2015	South Korea	Korean beef Bibimbap	Eric Tsang; Ruco Chan; Kristal Tin	Golden hook money tree (stir fried vermicelli)	Kitty Yuen (7 votes)	King Kong (3 votes)	Wash the dishes
18	Aug 23, 2015	South Korea		Eric Tsang; Ruco Chan; Kristal Tin				

^Note 9: Sr.3 episode 8 - Timmy Hung, Oscar Leung and Russell Cheung were surprised special guests since the restaurant they were dining at was being filmed by the show.
^Note 10: Sr.3 episode 10 - King Kong's mother, younger sister, brother-in-law and nephew were special guests during the Taipei, Taiwan segment.

=== Locations ===
Episode	Country	Abroad Restaurant(s) / Shop(s)	Hong Kong Restaurant(s) / Shop(s)	PK challenge restaurant
1	Singapore	Chin Huat Live Seafood Restaurant (鎮發活海鮮); G7 Sinma Live Seafood Restaurant (G7新馬活海鮮餐館); Ocean Curry Fish Head (海洋咖哩魚頭); House of Seafood (螃蟹之家); SeeFood Paradise (樂天海鮮); Mellben Seafood; Majestic Bay Seafood Restaurant @ Gardens By The Bay (冠華); Singapore Flyer; Strange Seafood Market (奇怪海鮮市場)	Café Malacca (馬來一菜館) @ Jen Hotel; Old Town Restaurant; Guangdong Restaurant (廣東飯莊)	(Sai Wan, Hong Kong); Café Malacca (馬來一菜館)
2	Singapore	Kim Choo (金珠); Guan Hoe Soon (源和春); Candlenut; Satay By The Bay; Kwong Satay (光沙爹)	Good Satay (好時沙嗲); Indonesian Sate House (印尼沙嗲屋); Hawker 18 (少爺18); Singapore & Malaysia Canteen (拿督星馬大飯店); Nyonya Coming (娘惹嫁到)	(Singapore); Guan Hoe Soon (源和春)
3	Singapore	Corner House; Saveur; The French Stall; Tian Tian Hainanese Chicken Rice (天天海南鸡饭); Wee Nam Kee Hainanese Chicken Rice Restaurant (威南记海南鸡饭); Loy Kee Best Chicken Rice (黎記海南雞飯); Good Year Local Hainanese Chicken Rice Ball (庆豐年海南鸡)	Golden Chicken (金雞去骨海南雞); Jules Bistro; Le Relais de l'Entrecôte	(Wan Chai, Hong Kong); QUAYSIDE
4	Singapore	Bollywood Veggies; Eisky & Delicious; The Living Cafe & Deli; I am... Outram Ya Hua Rou Gu Cha Restaurant (歐南園亞華肉骨茶); Founder Bakkutteh (發起人肉骨茶); Song Fa Bak Kut Teh (松發肉骨茶); Leong Kee (Klang) Bak Kut Teh (梁记(巴生)肉骨茶); Shop Wonderland	Bak Kut King (肉骨皇); Kadoorie Farm and Botanic Garden (嘉道理農場暨植物園); Leisurely Veggie (悠蔬食); Locofama	(Causeway Bay, Hong Kong); Leisurely Veggie (悠蔬食)
5	Singapore	Bee Heong Palace Restaurant (美香楼); Kim's Place Seafood (金記海鮮); Beach Road Prawn Mee Eating House (美芝律大虾面); Good Chance Popiah (好彩薄餅); Hill Street Fried Kway Teow (禧街炒粿条); Outram Park Fried Kway Teow Mee (歐南園粉粿條麵); Heng Huat Fried Kway Tiao (興發炒粿條); Chinatown Food Street	Nam Ah Restaurant (南亞1964); Kitchen 65; Chun Yeung St Street Market (春秧街市); Jan Jan Delicious Foods (真真美食店); PUTIEN (莆田)	(Singapore); Kim's Place Seafood (金記海鮮)
6	Singapore	Long Bar @ Raffles Singapore; Antoinette; Lim Chee Guan (林志源); Tan Hock Seng Cake Shop (陈福成饼家); Chin Mee Chin Coffee and Cake Shop (真美珍); Roxy Laksa & Prawn Noodles; Sungei Road Laksa (结霜桥叻沙); 328 Katong Laksa (328加東叻沙); Chin Huat Live Seafood Restaurant (镇发活海鲜); Depot Road Claypot Laksa (德普路真善美砂锅叻沙)	Katong Laksa Prawn Mee (加東叻沙蝦麵); Spice Papa; Boomshack; Next Station Dessert; 227 Desserts Tavern (227甜棧)	(Tsim Sha Tsui, Hong Kong); Sungai Wang @ Miramall (亞來金河@美麗華商場)
7	Taiwan	Tainan: Tainan Narcissus Palace Market (水仙宮市場); A Xiu Herbal Tea (阿秀苦茶青草茶); Da Wei Tang (大鮪堂); A Sha Restaurant (阿霞飯店); Small Hot Pepper Chinese Food (小辣椒家常小炒); Jiangchuan Dice Meat Rice (江川號肉燥飯); Fusheng (福生小食店); Yuan Da Cai Shì Pork Rice (原大菜市燒肉飯)	Fooody (伙食工業); YUAN Is Here (阿元來了); Grand Hill Taiwanese Restaurant (圓山台灣料理); Check-In Taipei	(Tainan, Taiwan); Small Hot Pepper Chinese Food (小辣椒家常小炒)
8	Taiwan	Taipei: Spicy Spirit (麻神麻辣火鍋); Hsiao Hung Mei (三重小紅莓石頭火鍋); Quan Restaurant (寬巷子鍋品美食); Shi Yun Taiwanese Fried Chicken @ Shida Night Market (師園鹽酥雞); Shilin Market Fried Chicken (饗味鹽酥雞士林店); Monga Fried Chicken @ Shilin Night Market (艋舺雞排 士林旗艦店) ^{11}	Cheng Ban Cheung Taiwanese Food (程班長台灣美食); YUAN Is Here (阿元來了); Fresh Enter (鮮入圍煮); Super Dai Chong Wah (Super大中華火鍋) ^{9} ^{12}	Recipe from: (Tainan, Taiwan); AMei Restaurant (阿美飯店); Cooked at: (Tsim Sha Tsui, Hong Kong); Dong Lai Shun @ Royal Garden Hotel (東來順)
9	Taiwan	Tainan: Wang Family Cattle Ranch (王家莊牧場); Hong Pin Beef (鴻品牛肉); AMing Beef Soup (阿銘牛肉湯); Yuan Huan Beef Soup (圓環牛肉湯); Tian Yue Hujiao Bing @ Tainan Flower Night Market (天玥胡椒餅); Gu Wei Xiang Tan Kao Hujiao Bing (古味香碳烤胡椒餅); Taipei: Fuzhou Hujiao Bing @ Shilin Night Market (福州世祖胡椒餅)	Dai Tou Fat (大頭佛城隍廟); Bistronomique Staunton; Ngau Saam Gun (牛三館); Yakiniku Futago HK (Futago HK大阪燒肉)	(Lai Chi Kok, Hong Kong); Cheng Ban Cheung Taiwanese Food (程班長台灣美食)
10	Taiwan	Tainan: Small Hot Pepper Chinese Food (小辣椒家常小炒); Taipei: Nanmen Market (南門市場); Good Cho's (好丘貝果); Good Design Institute (好氏研究室); Siang Shuai Cake (香帥蛋糕); 72 Beef Noodle Restaurant (七十二牛肉麵); Lao Zhang.Beef Noodle Restaurant (老張牛肉麵); Beef Father Beef Noodle Restaurant (牛爸爸牛肉麵)	Hu Hu Go Beef Noodles (養珍品牛肉麵); Cake Shop @ Royal Plaza Hotel (帝京酒店); The Lot On Possession; ATUM desserant	(Tainan, Taiwan); Jin Xia (錦霞樓)
11	Taiwan	Tainan: ATang Salty Congee (阿堂鹹粥); Du Xiao Yue Carry Noodles (度小月擔仔麵); Fu Sheng Hao Rice Cake (富盛號碗粿); Qi Gu Long Hai Hao (七股龍海號); Shi Jing Jiu Taiwanese Oyster Omelette (石精臼蚵仔煎); 4 Grass Taiwanese Oyster Omelette (四草蚵仔煎); Taipei: AFat Taiwanese Oyster Omelette @ Shida Night Market (阿發蚵仔煎)	Cheng Ban Cheung Taiwanese Food (程班長台灣美食); Chan Kan Kee Chiu Chow Restaurant (陳勤記鹵鵝飯店); Madam's Kitchen (好媽媽台灣館); Three Potatoes (叁薯); 18 Seat Doggy Noodles (十八座狗仔粉)	Recipe from: (Tainan, Taiwan); AGuang Stir Fry Eel (阿光軍炒鱔魚); Cooked at: (Tsim Sha Tsui, Hong Kong); Grand Hill Taiwanese Restaurant (圓山台灣料理)
12	Taiwan	Taipei: Jin Tai Japanese Restaurant (金泰日式料理); Da-Wan Yakiniku Dining Restaurant (大腕燒肉專門店); Kitamura Hōmu (北村家くるみ小料理屋); Ji-Nan Xian Soup Dumpling (濟南鮮湯包); Dian Shui Lou (點水樓); Ming Yue Soup Dumpling (明月湯包)	Wing Lai Yuen (詠藜園); Nanxiang Steamed Bun Restaurant (南翔饅頭店); Inagiku Japanese Restaurant (稻菊日本餐廳); Sekai no Yamachan Japan Restaurant (世界の山ちゃん)	(Causeway Bay, Hong Kong); Shirokiya (白木屋)
13	South Korea	Incheon: Incheon Complex Fish Market (인전종합이시장); Seoul: Pro Ganjang Gejang Samseong Branch (프로간장게장); Ihwa Mural Village (이화벽화마을); Kyochon Sinchon Station branch (교촌치킨 신촌점); Mirak Chicken (미락치킨호프)	Chicken HOF & SOJU (李家); The Seafood Kitchen; Fung Zi Siu (桻之燒)	(Sai Wan, Hong Kong); Fai Garden (輝苑火鍋海鮮小廚)
14	South Korea	Seoul: Gwangjang Market (광장시장); ULiJib Pojangmacha @ Jongno 3-ga (우리집 포장마차@종로3가역); Gil I-Ne @ Yongsan Station Pojangmacha (길이네@용산역포장마차); Palsaik Samgyupsal Korean BBQ (팔색삼겹살); Jeju-do Sa Don (제주돈사돈); Cheol Deun Nom (철든놈)	BBQ 7080yo Hing Kee Restaurant (避風塘興記); Oi Man Sang (愛文生)	(Gangnam-gu, Seoul, South Korea); Inlywon Culinary Studio (인리원)
15	South Korea			
16	South Korea			
17	South Korea			(Mong Kok, Hong Kong); Yuet Lai Shun (粵來順)
18	South Korea			

^Note 11: Sr.3 episode 8 - Monga Fried Chicken (艋舺雞排) is owned by Taiwanese comedian NoNo (陳宣裕).
^Note 12: Sr.3 episode 8 - Alan Tam and Eric Tsang are part owners of Super Dai Chong Wah (Super大中華火鍋).

== Assistants ==
Assistants are new or unknown artistes who tag along with the hosts. A male assistant teams up with Kitty Yuen while King Kong Lee has a female assistant that teams up with him. TVB uses this as a way to promote the new or unknown artistes.

In the first series the assistants accompany the two host almost throughout each entire episode.

In the second series the assistants only accompany the hosts during the viewer restaurants recommendation and final dish replica cooking competition segments.

During the third series, the series is filmed partially in an abroad country and Hong Kong. When the hosts are in the abroad country they have two new or unknown artistes that is local to that country. When they're in Hong Kong, two new Hong Kong artistes accompanies them. Final dish replica cooking completion takes place sometimes in the abroad country and sometimes in Hong Kong at a restaurant themed to that country's local cuisine.

Series 1

Episode	Kitty Yuen	King Kong Lee
1	Jacky Lei	Vanko Wong
2	Alan Wan	"Kibby" Rosella Lau
3	Jacky Lei	"Kibby" Rosella Lau
4	Jacky Lei	Vanko Wong
5	Jacky Lei	Vanko Wong
6	Alan Wan	Vanko Wong
7	Jacky Lei	Vanko Wong
8	Jacky Lei	"Kibby" Rosella Lau
9	Alan Wan	Vanko Wong
10	Jacky Lei	Vanko Wong
11	Jacky Lei	"Kibby" Rosella Lau
12	Jacky Lei	Vanko Wong
13	Jacky Lei	Vanko Wong
14	Jacky Lei	Vanko Wong
15	Jacky Lei	Vanko Wong
16	Jacky Lei	Vanko Wong
17	Jacky Lei	Vanko Wong
18	Alan Wan	Vanko Wong
19	Jacky Lei	Vanko Wong
20	Alan Wan	"Kibby" Rosella Lau
21	Alan Wan	Vanko Wong
22	Alan Wan	Vanko Wong
23	Alan Wan	Vanko Wong
24	Alan Wan	"Kibby" Rosella Lau
25	Alan Wan	Vanko Wong
26	Jacky Lei	"Kibby" Rosella Lau
27	Jacky Lei	"Kibby" Rosella Lau
28	Alan Wan	Vanko Wong
29	Bosco Wong; Jacky Lei; Alan Wan	Chrissie Chau; Vanko Wong "Kibby" Rosella Lau

Series 2

Episode	Kitty Yuen	King Kong Lee
1	Penny Chan	Devily Leung
2	James Ng	Kimmy Kwan
3	Penny Chan	Kimmy Kwan
4	Alan Wan	Gemma Choi
5	Alan Wan	Gemma Choi
6	Penny Chan	Kimmy Kwan
7	James Ng	Gemma Choi
8	James Ng	Gemma Choi
9	Penny Chan	Devily Leung
10	Penny Chan	Kimmy Kwan
11	Alan Wan	Kimmy Kwan
12	Penny Chan	Gemma Choi
13	Alan Wan	Kimmy Kwan
14	Penny Chan	Gemma Choi
15	James Ng	Gemma Choi
16	James Ng	Devily Leung
17	Penny Chan	Devily Leung
18	Nancy Wu; Penny Chan	Evergreen Mak; Gemma Choi

Series 3

Episode	Abroad			Hong Kong	
Episode	Country	Kitty Yuen	King Kong Lee	Kitty Yuen	King Kong Lee
1	Singapore	Jeremy Chan; Daren Tan	Candyce Toh	Darren Wong	Gloria Tang
2	Singapore	Jeremy Chan	Hayley Woo	Nathan Ngai	Vicky Chan
3	Singapore	Daren Tan	Hayley Woo	Michael Wai	Sammi Cheung
4	Singapore	Daren Tan	Candyce Toh	Michael Wai	Sammi Cheung
5	Singapore	Jeremy Chan	Candyce Toh	Michael Wai	Sammi Cheung
6	Singapore	Daren Tan	Hayley Woo	Michael Wai	Gloria Tang
7	Taiwan	Yofu Lin (A Bo)	Kelly Zhang	Darren Wong	Sammi Cheung
8	Taiwan	Yofu Lin (A Bo)	Tavani Hu	Michael Wai	Sammi Cheung
9	Taiwan	Yofu Lin (A Bo)	Kelly Zhang; Tavani Hu	Michael Wai	Sammi Cheung
10	Taiwan	Yofu Lin (A Bo)	Kelly Zhang; Tavani Hu	Arnold Kwok	Vicky Chan
11	Taiwan	Yofu Lin (A Bo)	Kelly Zhang	Darren Wong	Sammi Cheung
12	Taiwan	Yofu Lin (A Bo)	Tavani Hu	Arnold Kwok	Vicky Chan
13	South Korea	Ricky Kim	Jane Yoon	Arnold Kwok	Gloria Tang
14	South Korea	Ricky Kim	Jane Yoon	Arnold Kwok	Gloria Tang
15	South Korea	Ricky Kim	Jane Yoon	Michael Wai	Sammi Cheung
16	South Korea	Ricky Kim	Jane Yoon	Michael Wai	Sammi Cheung
17	South Korea	Ricky Kim	Jane Yoon	Arnold Kwok	Gloria Tang
18	South Korea	Ricky Kim	Jane Yoon		

== Viewership Ratings ==
Series 1

#	Timeslot (HKT)	Week	Episode(s)	Average points	Peaking points
1	Mon – Fri; 22:30 – 23:00	03–6 May 2011	1 — 4		
2	Mon – Fri; 22:30 – 23:00	09–13 May 2011	8 — 9	24	
3	Mon – Fri; 22:30 – 23:00	16–20 May 2011	10 — 14		
4	Mon – Fri; 22:30 – 23:00	23–27 May 2011	15 — 19		
5	Mon – Fri; 22:30 – 23:00	30 May–3 June 2011	20 — 24	24	
6	Mon – Fri; 22:30 – 23:00	06–10 June 2011	25 — 29		
Total average					

Series 2

#	Timeslot (HKT)	Week	Episode(s)	Average points	Peaking points
1	Sun; 20:00 – 21:00	18 Nov 2012	1	28	
2	Sun; 20:00 – 21:00	25 Nov 2012	2	26	
3	Sun; 20:00 – 21:00	02 Dec 2012	3	25	
4	Sun; 20:00 – 21:00	09 Dec 2012	4	26	
5	Sun; 20:00 – 21:00	16 Dec 2012	5	24	
6	Sun; 20:00 – 21:00	23 Dec 2012	6	22	
7	Sun; 20:00 – 21:00	30 Dec 2012	7	25	
8	Sun; 20:00 – 21:00	06 Jan 2013	8	25	
9	Sun; 20:00 – 21:00	27 Jan 2013	9	21	
10	Sun; 20:00 – 21:00	03 Feb 2013	10	21	
11	Sun; 20:00 – 21:00	17 Feb 2013	11	21	
12	Sun; 20:00 – 21:00	03 Mar 2013	12	22	
13	Sun; 20:00 – 21:00	10 Mar 2013	13	21	
14	Sun; 20:00 – 21:00	17 Mar 2013	14	22	
15	Sun; 20:00 – 21:00	24 Mar 2013	15	22	
16	Sun; 20:00 – 21:00	31 Mar 2013	16	18	
17	Sun; 20:00 – 21:00	07 Apr 2013	17		
18	Sun; 20:00 – 21:00	14 Apr 2013	18		
Total average					

Series 3

#	Timeslot (HKT)	Week	Episode(s)	Average points	Peaking points
1	Sun; 19:35 – 20:30	26 April 2015	1	20	22
2	Sun; 19:35 – 20:30	3 May 2015	2	20	
3	Sun; 19:35 – 20:30	10 May 2015	3	18	
4	Sun; 19:35 – 20:30	17 May 2015	4	18	18
5	Sun; 19:35 – 20:30	24 May 2015	5	21	
6	Sun; 19:35 – 20:30	31 May 2015	6	20	
7	Sun; 19:35 – 20:30	7 June 2015	7	20	
8	Sun; 19:35 – 20:30	14 June 2015	8	21	
9	Sun; 19:35 – 20:30	21 June 2015	9	21	
10	Sun; 19:35 – 20:30	28 June 2015	10	21	
11	Sun; 19:35 – 20:30	5 July 2015	11	19	
12	Sun; 19:35 – 20:30	12 July 2015	12	22	
13	Sun; 19:35 – 20:30	19 July 2015	13	20	
14	Sun; 19:35 – 20:30	26 July 2015	14	20	
15	Sun; 19:35 – 20:30	02 Aug 2015	15	18	
16	Sun; 19:35 – 20:30	09 Aug 2015	16	20	
17	Sun; 19:35 – 20:30	16 Aug 2015	17		
18	Sun; 19:35 – 20:30	23 Aug 2015	18		
Total average					

== Reception ==
The pairing of Kitty Yuen and King Kong Lee was well received by viewers. The comic relief and chemistry of the two host lead many to speculate that they were in a May–December romance, which Lee flatly denied by telling reporters that Yuen was too old for him. While Yuen joked with reporters that the two might have a chance to be a couple. The popularity of their collaboration also lead TVB to cast both as the male and female lead of an upcoming drama called Love as a Predatory Affair (愛情食物鏈), which started filming in May 2015.
