= Pepper cake =

Pepper cake may refer to various spiced cakes or biscuits, some containing black pepper:

- Gingerbread, known as pfefferkuchen in German
- Lebkuchen, also known as pfefferkuchen
- Ontbijtkoek, a Dutch/Flemish cake also known as peperkoek
- Pryanik, from eastern Europe
- Hujiao bing, literally "black pepper cake", from China
- Ginger snap, known as pepparkakor in Swedish, piparkakut in Finnish, piparkūkas in Latvian, piparkoogid in Estonian, and pepperkaker in Norwegian (literally, 'pepper cakes')
