= Kitty Yuen =

Hong Kong performer (born 1970)

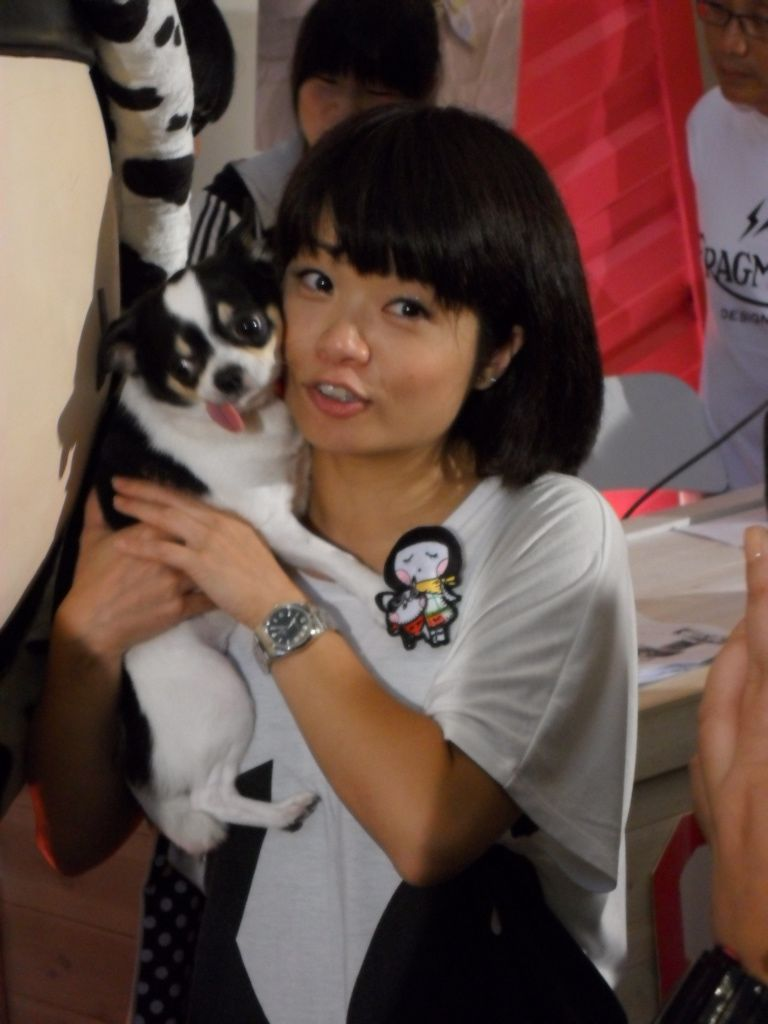
- Yuen in September 2010
- Born: 23 November 1970 (age 55); Hong Kong
- Education: Hong Kong Polytechnic University
- Occupations: Radio DJ; television host; actress
- Years active: 1996—present
- Musical career
- Also known as: Siu Yee (小儀)
- Origin: Xinhui, People's Republic of China

Kitty Yuen (Chinese: 阮小儀; born 23 November 1970) is a Hong Kong radio DJ, television host and actress. At 148 cm tall, she is one of the most small entertainers in the Hong Kong entertainment industry.

== Life and career ==
Yuen studied at the Sacred Heart Canossian College and the Hong Kong Polytechnic University Design Department. She is best known for hosting the variety food reality television series Neighborhood Gourmet with Taiwanese host King Kong Lee.

== Filmography ==
=== TV series ===
Title	Year	Role	Notes
2000	War of the Genders	Happy	
2002	Feel 100%	Danielle	
2004	Hearts of Fencing	食客（客串）	
2007	Colours of Love	various characters including Kitty	
2008	D.I.E	Ng Siu-Yi	Nominated – TVB Anniversary Award for My Favourite Female Character (Top 10)
2009	D.I.E Again	So Bik	
2010	Don Juan De Mercado	荊止高	
2011	Only You	Man Ching/Maggie	
2012	Queens of Diamonds and Hearts	Chung Lai Chi	
2013	Triumph in the Skies II	Moon Ko/Ko Mun-yuet	
2014	Come On, Cousin	Kam Kwong (金礦)	
2016	Love as a Predatory Affair	Lo Kwai-fong	
2017	The Exorcist's Meter	Kwai Li-fu (季莉芙)	
2018	Apple-colada		
2020	The Exorcist’s 2nd Meter	Kwai Li-fu (季莉芙)	

=== Host ===
Year	English title	Chinese Title	Network	Notes/Ref.
2011	Neighborhood Gourmet	街坊廚神	TVB	With King Kong Lee
2012	Neighborhood Gourmet (Series 2)	街坊廚神食四方	TVB	With King Kong Lee
2015	Neighborhood Gourmet (Series 3)	街坊廚神舌戰新台韓	TVB	With King Kong Lee
2021	Battle Feel	考有Feel	ViuTV	Game show, With Edan Lui and Dixon Wong
2022	The One Take Show	1 Take過	ViuTV	With Tiger Yau, Dixon Wong and Kathy Wong
