= 2 More Loves =

Studio album by 2moro
- Released: November 23, 2006
- Genre: Pop/Rock
- Length: 59:50
- Label: Rock Records

2moro chronology
| 雙胞胎的初回盤 (2006) | 2 More Loves (2006) |

2 More Loves is an album released by 2moro. The album remains first, only and final full-length album through Rock Records.

The album features previously debut self-titled (or 雙胞胎的初回盤) EP, it contains five songs, as well as nine new songs.

== Track listing ==
2 More Loves
| No. | Title | Length |
|---|---|---|
| 1. | "大明星狂想曲 (Da Ming Xing Kuang Xiang Qu)" (Daydreaming Of Being A Superstar) | 7:20 |
| 2. | "男生女生配 (Nan Sheng Nu Sheng Pei)" (Boys Match Girls) | 4:38 |
| 3. | "圍巾" (Scarf) | 4:16 |
| 4. | "朋友出去走走" (Hangout With Friends) | 3:42 |
| 5. | "被騙了" (Cheated) | 4:19 |
| 6. | "找到你" (Found You) | 4:10 |
| 7. | "牽著妳" (Holding You) | 4:03 |
| 8. | "塔基拉BON" (Tequila Bon) | 4:05 |
| 9. | "兩個我" (Two Of Me) | 4:27 |
| 10. | "少了" (Less) | 3:31 |
| 11. | "刺激2006" (Hit 2006) | 4:49 |
| 12. | "初吻" (First Kiss) | 3:08 |
| 13. | "夏天不打烊" (No Closing In Summer) | 3:35 |
| 14. | "Shabu Shabu" (OT: Dragostea Din Tei) | 3:37 |
