= Love as a Predatory Affair =

Hong Kong television series

- Official poster
- Also known as: Love Food Chain
- 愛情食物鏈
- Genre: Modern, Romance, Comedy
- Created by: Hong Kong Television Broadcasts Limited
- Written by: Pun Hoi-yan, Au Yuk-han, Ma Cheng-man, Tsang Hon, Wong Siu-lung, Koo Yee-lai
- Directed by: Liu Chun-sek, Chan Chi-gwong, Chan Hon-sing, Yung Man-wing
- Starring: Kitty Yuen; King Kong Lee; Jason Chan; Samantha Ko; Stephanie Ho; Brian Tse; Erin Wong; Timothy Cheng
- Theme music composer: Alan Cheung
- Opening theme: Love Chain (愛情食物鏈) by Stephanie Ho
- Country of origin: Hong Kong
- Original language: Cantonese
- No. of episodes: 21

Production
- Executive producer: Catherine Tsang
- Producer: Steven Tsui
- Production location: Hong Kong
- Camera setup: Multi camera
- Running time: 45 minutes
- Production company: TVB

Original release
- Network: Jade; HD Jade
- Release: 11 January – 7 February 2016

Love as a Predatory Affair
- Traditional Chinese: 愛情食物鏈
- Simplified Chinese: 爱情食物链
- Cantonese Yale: Oichìng Sihkmahtlín
- Literal meaning: "Love Food Chain"
Transcriptions
Standard Mandarin
- Hanyu Pinyin: Aiqíng Shíwùliàn
- Bopomofo: ㄞˋㄑㄧㄥˊ ㄕˊㄨˋㄌㄧㄢˋ
Yue: Cantonese
- Yale Romanization: Oichìng Sihkmahtlín
- Jyutping: Oi3cing4 Sik6mat6lin2

Love as a Predatory Affair (Chinese: 愛情食物鏈; Cantonese Yale: Oichìng Sihkmahtlín; literally "Love Food Chain") is a 2016 Hong Kong modern romantic comedy television drama produced by TVB. Starring Kitty Yuen, King Kong Lee, Jason Chan and Samantha Ko as the main leads. It premiered on January 11, 2016, airing every Monday to Friday on Hong Kong's Jade and HD Jade channels during its 8:30-9:30 pm timeslot with a total of 21 episodes.

The drama is an indirect spin-off of Kitty Yuen and King Kong Lee's popular reality food tour variety series Neighborhood Gourmet, which has spanned 3 series to date.

== Synopsis ==
Lo Kai-fong (Kitty Yuen) is reliable, intelligent and a great cook, yet her only setback in romance is her shortness. She works as a sales manager at her father's struggling food distribution company, Dou Ling. Due to an employee's illiteracy in English, the company accidentally distributes bitter melons to all of their customers. To resolve the problem and prevent their customers from suing them because of their mistakes Kai-fong goes to each restaurant showing them the many useful ways a bitter melon can be cooked. On her first stop she meets Hung Hsien (King Kong Lee), a kitchen assistant and her 'dream boy' Pete Lau (Jason Chan), who is there to conduct business with the head chef. Her attractive best friend Ko Kwai-fun (Samantha Ko) who calls herself Hestia, also happens to be at the same restaurant on a speed dating function. Hestia finds the guys at her speed dating party unsuitable for her and decides to set her sights on Pete.

Later that day she finds out Pete is another customer that had received the bitter melon order. Pete owns a fast food restaurant chain, and by receiving over 4000 units of wrong ingredients, his company is put in jeopardy. When he asks his uncle, who owns a competing fast food restaurant chain, similar to his for help, he finds out how cut-throat business can be as his uncle tries to price gauge him. However, Kai-fong saves him from humiliation and failure during his food show interview when she comes up with twelve delicious different dishes made with bitter melon. Pete soon finds himself relying on Kai-fong again when none of his chefs can duplicate the taste of the dishes Kai-fong creates.

Kai-fong's new tenant, renting her family's empty apartment is Hung Hsien, a Taiwanese man who has only been in Hong Kong for one month. Kai-fong finds him creepy because of his unattractiveness and for overly idolising her for her cooking skills. Most people misunderstand him for a pervert. Hung Hsien is actually on a secret mission working as a kitchen assistant in Hong Kong's best restaurants to learn their secrets. He is disappointed when he finds out their secret ingredients are canned food and MSG, which Kai-fong helps him uncover. Also, Hung is gifted with the ability to make exact measurements just by eyeing it. Kai-fong, who cooks without recording measurements, depend on Hung Hsien to help her write the bitter melon recipes. After Hung helps Kai-fong succeed, she teaches him cooking.

Hung Hsien sets his sights on the tall and attractive Hestia as a romantic partner. However, Hestia only sees him as a creepy pervert and doesn't find him as a suitable partner. Hestia works alongside her mother as a fishmonger which she hates. Even though their small family business is successful, her shallow thinking is to hook a rich guy in order to escape her fishmonger profession. Not book smart or talented in anything, she spends her money on beauty treatment products and designer clothing to boost her appearance. After encountering Pete she sets her sights on him since he meets her targeted desires, being rich and handsome. However, she isn't the only one who has a crush on him...

== Cast ==
=== Lo family ===
- Pat Poon as Lo Sat (魯實; homophone to "honest 老實")

Jeana's husband. Kai-fong, Kai-lun and Kai-kei's father. Minority owner of Dou Ling Food Distribution. He is considered useless. The family business, home and properties where left to him by his father-in-law.

- Susan Tse as Jeana Lo Dou Ching-lok (魯竇靜樂; homophone to "Dad is worthless 老豆淨落")

Lo Sat's wife. Kai-fong, Kai-lun and Kai-kei's mother.

- Kitty Yuen as Lo Kai-fong (魯佳芳; homophone to "old neighborhood 老街坊")

Lo Sat and Jeana's eldest child and daughter. She is also the shortest person in her entire family. She works at her father's food distribution company as a sales manager. She is dependable, kind and intelligent but because of her height and average looks she is often disrespected by strangers. She is also good at cooking. Pete is her dream man because she has a dream that she was Eve and he was her Adam.

- Brian Tse as Lo Kai-lun (魯佳麟)

Lo Sat and Jeana's middle child and son. He is unambitious and aimless. After graduating from college, he spends his time producing nonsense short films. He winds up developing a series of online cooking videos featuring Hestia, whose actual cooking is formed by Kai-fong as a hand double.

- Erin Wong as Lo Kai-kei (魯佳麒)

Lo Sat and Jeana's youngest child and daughter.

=== Hung family ===
- Choi Kwok-Hing as Hung Tai-dam (洪大擔)

Hung Sin's father and owner of a noodle empire in Taiwan.

- King Kong Lee as Hung Sin (洪鱻; nicknamed "Hung Sam Yue 紅衫魚", nemipterus fish in Chinese)

A recent Taiwanese arrival to Hong Kong. In order to become the best cook he works as a low level kitchen assistant at all of Hong Kong's best restaurants to learn their trade secret but finds out most of them depend on canned ingredients and MSG. Kwai-fong originally thought he was a pervert because of his creepy attitude towards her and unattractive looks, but when he becomes her tenant she finds out he has a gift for eyeing measurements. She later accepts him as a disciple and teaches him how to cook.

=== Ko family ===
- Angelina Lo as Choi Lin (蔡蓮)

Hestia's single mother. She is a fish monger who owns her own shop. She is often looked down upon by her daughter because of their profession as fish mongers even though the business does well.

- Samantha Ko as Hestia Ko Kwai-fun (高貴芬)

Choi Lin's daughter and Kwai-fong's best friend since High School. She became friends with Kwai-fong when she saved her from bullies but in exchange Kwai-fong has to help her do homework. A superficial person who is ashamed of her family's business as fish mongers, so ashamed that she mask off her entire face when working alongside her mother. She uses money earned to buy all kinds of beauty products and goes on dating parties to try to hook a well to do man in order to escape her fishmonger life. She develops an attraction for Pete at first sight. She becomes an internet sensation when Lo Kwai-lun decides to produce instructional cooking videos to rival Selina. Regal Lau uses lies to trick her into becoming her spokes person and mistress. She becomes pregnant with Regal's child but decides to betray and leave him seeing how heartless he is to his first ex-wife Yau Choi-fa and son Lau Yuen.

=== Lau family ===
- Lau Kong as Lau Kam (劉鏶)

Pete's father and Lau Lei-ko's older brother. Originally a cook he later opened the Best Taste Restaurant chain that he has since passed the business to his son. He and his younger brother do not get along since he was very hard on his brother when teaching him to be a cook.

- Timothy Cheng as Regal Lau Lei-ko (劉利高; homophone to "Ox-tongue pastry 牛脷酥")
  - Hero Yuen as young Lau Lei-ko (青年劉利高)

Lau Kam's younger brother and Pete's uncle. Also Yau Choi-fa's husband and Lau Yuen's father. Not getting along with his brother he opens the Great Taste Restaurant chain to compete with him. He is a cut-throat person who refused to help his nephew Pete. Wanting Best Taste to go out of business he hires Bau Wan-bun to sabotage them and then also has him to have an affair with his wife Yau Choi-fa in order to divorce her without paying her alimony and take sole custody of their son Lau Yuen. Hestia Ko becomes his new mistress and pregnant with his child but betrays him when she sees how ruthless and heartless he could be.

- Griselda Yeung as Yau Choi-fa (尤賽花; homophone to "canola flower 油菜花")

Lau Lei-ko's wife and Lau Yuen's mother. She only care about spending her husband's money. She is in a loveless marriage with her husband but refuse to leave him in order to still live off of him. When she and Regal divorce, she initially gains legal custody of their son, which she uses to leverage alimony in order to continue living lavishly.

- Jason Chan Chi-san as Pete Lau Pak-yip (劉柏業; homophone to "omasum 牛柏葉")

Lau Kam's son and Lau Lei-ko's nephew. After studying business abroad he is put in charge of his father's Best Taste Restaurant chain business. However, none of the employees respect him. When Dou Ling accidentally orders 4000 bitter melon for Best Taste, it puts his company in jeopardy. Kai-fong saves him by creating 12 dishes with bitter melon. Both Kai-fong and Hestia both have crushes on him and are secretly trying to court him.

- Choi Wai-lam as Lau Yuen (劉遠; homophone and nicknamed Ngau Yuen, "beef ball 牛丸" in Chinese)

Lau Lei-ko and Yau Choi-fa's slightly obese preteen son. He is lazy, thoughtless, and tactless, caring only about video games, eating junk food, and looking at images of attractive women on the internet. Though his mother initially has legal custody of him, she is blackmailed into giving sole custody to her husband so he will no longer have to pay her alimony. Because his father doesn't really care for him, Regal decides to send him abroad and won't let him see his mother.

=== Dou Ling Food distributors ===
- Joseph Lee as Ling Yue-kau (凌宇球; homophone to "dace ball 鯪魚球")

Majority owner of Dou Ling. He is Jeana's younger cousin. A stingy person who finds every possible way not to give commission or bonuses to his employees when there is profits.

- C-Kwan as Ying Yip-yuen (邢燁源; homophone to "sales person 營業員")

Sales person at Dou Ling. He is not skilled in English and enters wrong orders by mistaking Boston apples with Balsam apple and melons with bitter melon thinking the word bitter is better, causing the company to distribute bitter melons to their customers. He also likes Lo Kwai-kei and shows off when he is in front of her. However, he is not very intelligent and often gives away important information while showing off.

- Ronald Law as Pau Wan-pan (包宏彬; homophone and nicknamed Pau Wan Ton "wrapping wonton 包雲吞" in Chinese)

Dou Ling's accountant and Lo Kai-kei's boyfriend. He was hired by Jeana to keep an eye on Dou Ling for her since she does not trust her cousin Ling Yue-kau and can't rely on her husband Lo Sat. For money he works for Regal in sabotaging Best Taste and also has an affair with his wife so he can divorce her without paying alimony. He does not hesitate to take advantage of others for his own benefit, especially if he can make money quickly with little effort.

=== Best Taste Restaurant employees ===
Head office

- Ngai Wai-man as Sam
- Tony Yee as Jacky
- Mandy Lam as Flora
- Snow Suen as Jessica

Flagship restaurant front shop

- Stephanie Ho as Kimchi Yeung Kam-chi (楊金枝)

A young woman who has moved into the city to work and a new tenant at Kai-fong's family apartment. She has a sharp tongue and is unafraid of standing up for herself, even if it means losing her job. When she manages to expose a corrupt manager at a Best Taste branch and stop his attempts to sabotage the restaurant during a surprise health inspection, Pete decides to promote her as the new manager. Kai-lun has a crush on her and they later become a couple.

- Ricky Lee as Law Sei (羅四)
- Fanny Ip as Nga Ping (艾蘋)
- Apple Chan as Lau Yuk-hing (劉玉馨)
- Ice Chow as Lee Kai-kwan (李佳君)
- Kinlas Chan as Chan Wai-ming (陳偉明)
- Jim Tang as Chow Keung (周強)
- So Lai-ming as Choi Lai-chu (蔡麗珠)
- Deborah Poon as Lam Sam (林心)
- Sky Chiu as Fok Kam-yuen (霍金元)
- Lily Liew as Yip Mei-ting (葉美婷)

Flagship restaurant kitchen

- Henry Yu as Tau Chau-suk (頭抽叔)
- Leo Tsang as Wah (華哥)
- Eddie Li as Yau (友哥)
- Gary Tam as Shek (阿錫)
- Wang Wai-tak as Shing (成哥)
- Alex Yung as Bean sprout (芽菜仔)
- Kelvin Lee as B (B仔)

=== Great Taste Restaurant employees ===
Head office

- Man Yeung as Ben
- Helen Shum as Carrie

Flagship restaurant front shop

- Kitterick Yiu as Lam Wai-ching(林瑋澄)
- GoGo Cheung as Chan Ping (陳萍)
- Clare Chan as Lau Cheng-kwan (劉靜鈞)
- Andy Lau Tin-lung as Ng Chiu-wing (吳超榮)
- Wong Hong-kiu as Lok Siu-chun (樂小珍)
- George Ng as Kwok Ka-hei (郭家禧)
- Bobo Yeung as Leung Hoi-kwan (梁凱綸)
- Aris Li as Chan Hon-shing (陳漢城)
- Kitty Lau as Lui Shan-shan (呂珊珊)

=== Extended cast ===
- Paisley Wu as Selina Sa Lin-na (莎蓮娜)

Host of a popular web streaming foods variety program named after herself "Selina". She is actually a fake who knows nothing about food. She depends on heavy makeup to make her look presentable and a hand double to do all the cooking on her show, while resorting to bribery when she can't avoid cooking.

- Jack Hui as Augustino

Head chef and owner of a high class modern restaurant named "Augustino's Kitchen" in Hong Kong. His secret ingredient is canned luncheon meat.

- Cheng Shu-fung as Bau Tuet (鮑七)

Head chef and owner of a famous restaurant in Hong Kong named "Tuet Abalone King". His secret ingredient to his famous abalone recipe is MSG.

- Mok Wai-man as Uncle Mai (米叔)

A regular customer at the Lo's fish market. Hestia is always rude to him and gives him the wrong order.

- MoMo Wu as Female student #1 (女學生#1)

A student along with female student #2 who bullied Lo Kwai-fong in high school because she had good grades.

- Hebe Chan as Female student #2 (女學生#2)

A student along with female student #1 who bullied Lo Kwai-fong in high school because she had good grades.

- Wingto Lam as Prostitute (妓女)

A prostitute pretending to be a nurse who tries to rent the Lo's vacant apartment.

- Tristan Cheung as Pimp (拉皮條)

Pimp of the prostitute that rents the Lo's apartment. When Jeana tries to collect first month and deposit rent he uses threat and intimidation.

- Akai Lee as Director (導演)

Selina's food program director.

- CC Cho as School girl #1 (學生妹#1)

While dining at Best Taste Restaurant, she and School girl #2 bother the other customers by throwing food at them.

- Cheung Sze-yan as School girl #2 (學生妹#2)

While dining at Best Taste Restaurant, she and School girl #1 bother the other customers by throwing food at them.

== Development ==
- The costume fitting ceremony was held on May 21, 2015 at 1:00 pm Tseung Kwan O TVB City Studio One.
- The blessing ceremony was held on June 16, 2015 at 3:00 pm Tseung Kwan O TVB City Studio Twelve.
- Filming took place from May to August 2015 entirely on location in Hong Kong and TVB studios.

== Viewership ratings ==
Timeslot (HKT)	#	Week	Episode(s)	Average points	Peaking points
Mon – Fri (8:30-9:30 pm); 20:30–21:30	1	11 – 15 Jan 2016	1 – 5	26	29
Mon – Fri (8:30-9:30 pm); 20:30–21:30	2	18 – 22 Jan 2016	6 – 10	26	--
Mon – Fri (8:30-9:30 pm); 20:30–21:30	3	25 – 29 Jan 2016	11 – 15	27	31
Mon – Fri (8:30-9:30 pm); 20:30–21:30	4	01 – 05 Feb 2016	16 – 20	27	30
Mon – Fri (8:30-9:30 pm); 20:30–21:30	4	Sat 06 Feb 2016	21	25	29
Total average				27	31

== International broadcast ==
Network	Country	Airing Date	Timeslot
Astro On Demand	Malaysia	January 11, 2016	Monday – Friday 8:30 – 9:15 pm
TVBJ	Australia	January 13, 2016	Monday – Friday 7:15 – 8:15 pm
Starhub TV	Singapore	May 6, 2016	Monday – Friday 8:00 – 9:00 pm

== Awards and nominations ==
Year	Ceremony	Category	Nominee	Result
2016	StarHub TVB Awards	My Favourite TVB Drama	Love as a Predatory Affair	Nominated
2016	StarHub TVB Awards	My Favourite TVB Supporting Actress	Samantha Ko	Nominated
2016	StarHub TVB Awards	My Favourite TVB Female TV Character	Samantha Ko	Nominated
2016	StarHub TVB Awards	My Favourite TVB Theme Song	"Love Chain" (愛情食物鏈) by Stephanie Ho	Nominated
2016	TVB Star Awards Malaysia	My Favourite TVB On Screen Couple	Jason Chan & Samantha Ko	Nominated
2016	TVB Star Awards Malaysia	My Favourite Top 15 TVB Drama Characters	Kitty Yuen	Nominated
2016	TVB Star Awards Malaysia	My Favourite Top 15 TVB Drama Characters	King Kong Lee	Nominated
2016	TVB Anniversary Awards	Best Series	Love as a Predatory Affair	Nominated
2016	TVB Anniversary Awards	Best Actress	Kitty Yuen	Nominated
2016	TVB Anniversary Awards	Best Actress	Samantha Ko	Nominated
2016	TVB Anniversary Awards	Most Popular TV Male Character	Jason Chan	Nominated
2016	TVB Anniversary Awards	Most Popular Series Song	"Love Chain" (愛情食物鏈) by Stephanie Ho	Nominated
