= 2moro (album) =

- Special Edition (CD/DVD)

EP by 2moro
- Released: March 8, 2006
- Genre: Pop/Rock
- Length: 34:24
- Label: Rock Records

2moro chronology
2moro (2006)	2 More Loves (2006)

2moro (雙胞胎的初回盤) is the debut EP released by 2moro.

2moro
No.	Title	Length
1.	"初吻" (First Kiss)	3:06
2.	"牵着你" (Holding Your Hand)	4:00
3.	"Shabu Shabu (OT: Dragostea Din Tei)"	3:30
4.	"刺激2006" (Hot 2006)	4:45
5.	"少了" (Less)	3:31
6.	"初吻 (Remix 版)" (First Kiss Remix)	3:13
7.	"Shabu Shabu (伴奏)" (Shabu Shabu Karaoke Version)	3:30
8.	"刺激 2006 (伴奏)" (Hot 2006 Karaoke Version)	4:45
9.	"少了 (伴奏)" (Less Karaoke Version)	3:31
