= Hujiao bing =

Chinese baked bun

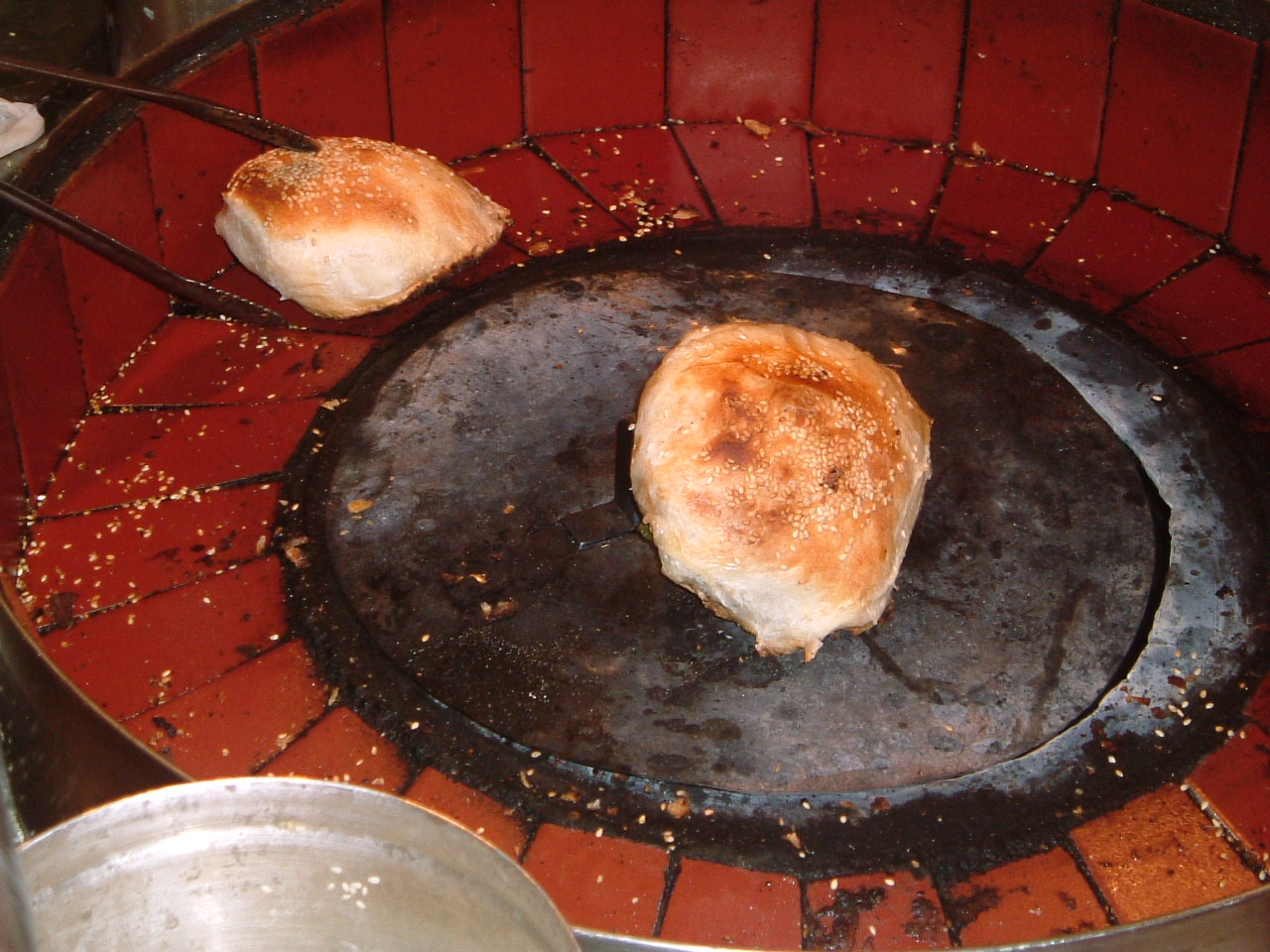
- Hujiao bing right out of the oven
- Alternative names: Pepper cake, pepper bun
- Course: Snack
- Place of origin: China
- Region or state: Fuzhou, Fujian
- Main ingredients: Flaky biscuit-like bread, sugar, soy sauce, white pepper or black pepper, and scallions

Hujiao bing or pepper bun (Chinese: 胡椒餅; pinyin: hújiāo bǐng; Pe̍h-ōe-jī: hô͘-chio-piáⁿ; lit. 'black pepper cake or biscuit') is a type of baked bun that originated in city of Fuzhou, the capital of China's Fujian province. It is a street food that has become popular in Taiwan and can be found in night markets or mini food stalls throughout Taiwan. The common ingredients are flour, water, and a leavening agent for the outer dough shell, and a meat protein (usually pork or beef) marinated with sugar, soy sauce, white pepper or black pepper, and scallion for the inside filling.

== Origin ==
It is not known who invented hujiaobing. The dish can be found in Fujian and in Taiwan. Taiwanese vendors list the item as "Fuzhou Pepper Bun" (福州胡椒餅) and credit the creation of the bun to immigrants from Fuzhou. Many of the oldest pepper bun vendors were established by those of with ancestry from Fuzhou.

== Preparation ==
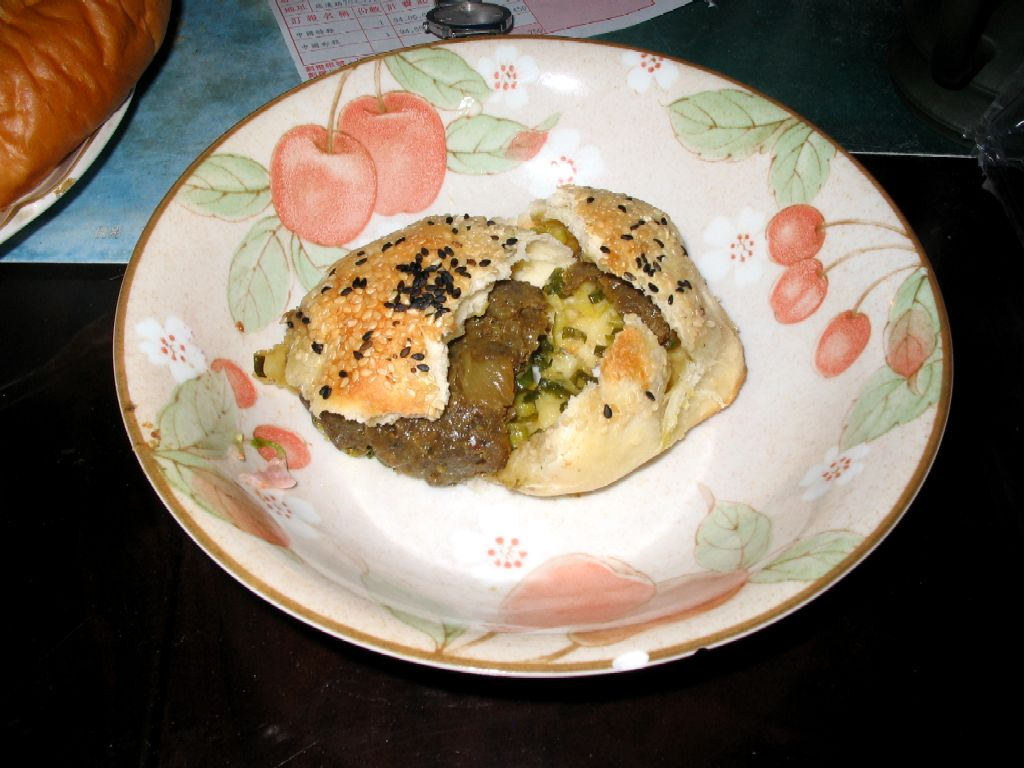
Inside of a cooked hujiao bing

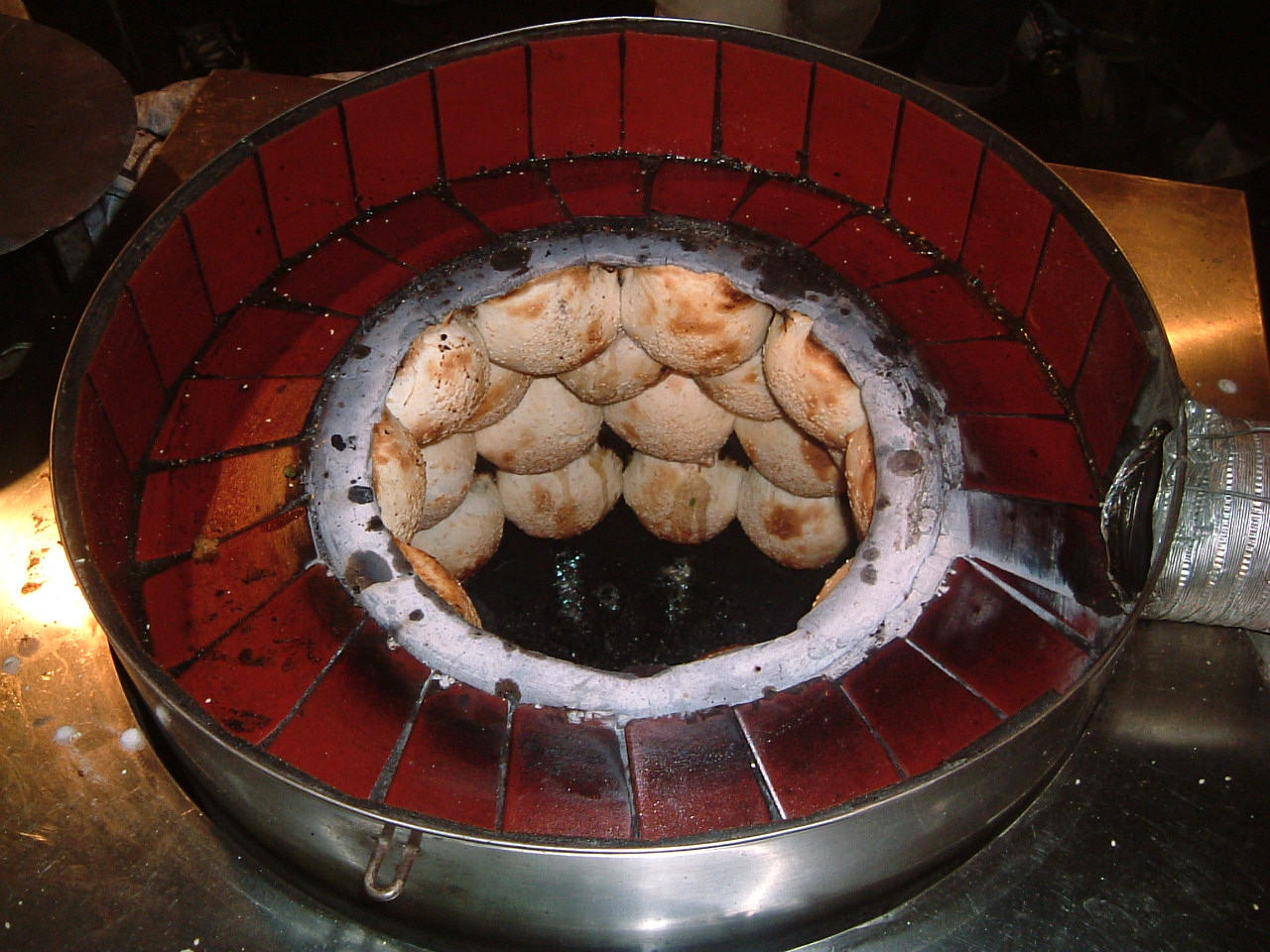
Hujiao bing baked in an oven

The outer dough shell is prepared with flour, water, and a leavening agent such as yeast or baking powder. Lard, butter or oil is sometime added to the dough to make the bun extra crunchy and flaky like a croissant when cooked. The outer shell dough is then individually rolled to a thin circular shape, similar to a dumpling wrapping.

The main ingredients of the filling are meat which is usually pork. The meat is either ground or sliced thinly. Some vendors use ground and sliced meat to give the bun a bite to it, but ground meat is usually used since it produces more juice when cooked. The meat is usually marinated with a heaping of white or black pepper powder, soy sauce, sugar and cooking wine. Some vendors also add five-spice powder or curry powder to the meat marinade.

The marinated meat is spread on the thin dough. A handful of cut green scallions is then placed on top of the meat and sealed up with the dough. The scallions must be added in a separate step - never mixed into the meat filling - to produce a clear scallion taste to the bun. Unlike other buns, the sealed end is on the bottom. The top of the bun is then brushed with water and finished with a sprinkling of white sesame seeds.

The buns are then baked in a cylindrical, high-heat, clay oven that is similar to a tandoori oven. Burning charcoal is put at the bottom to heat the oven. The buns are then stacked vertically along the side of the oven, from bottom to top. To remove the finished buns, a flat object such as a blunt knife or spatula is used to scrape the bun off of the side of the oven. A colander is then used to catch the buns to prevent them from falling into the charcoal pit at the bottom of the oven.

The cooked bun has a crunchy, thin dough, almost cracker like. When bitten into, meat juices pour out. Due to the way that the bun is wrapped, the green scallions are at the center of the bun with the meat wrapped around them, instead of at the bottom.

== Popularity ==
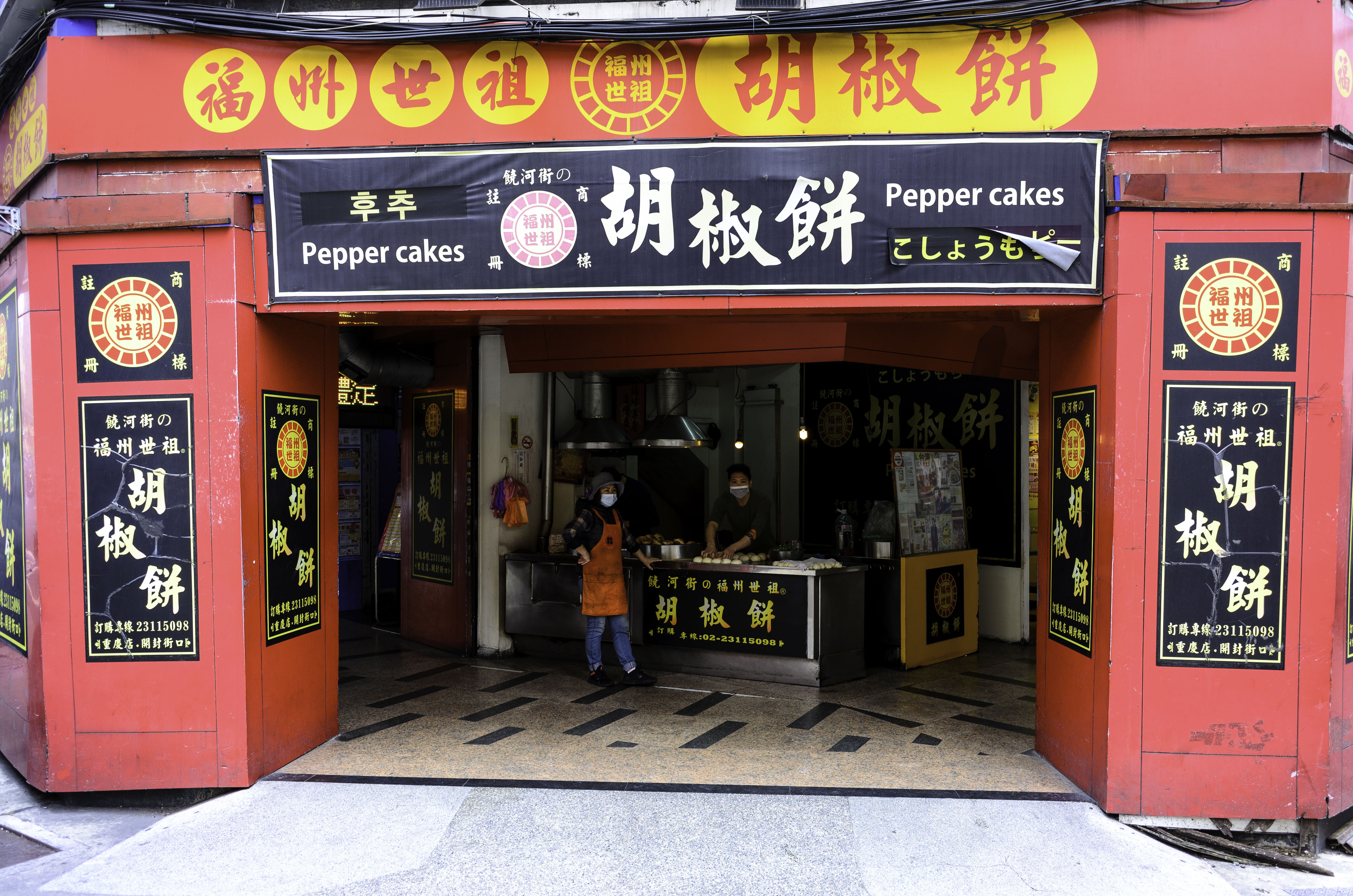
Hujiao bing store in Taiwan

Hujiao bing first started gaining popularity outside of Taiwan when it was featured on tourist programs such as Anthony Bourdain's The Layover. Also Hong Kong's TVB channel foodie show Neighborhood Gourmet season 3. The item soon became a tourist must try when visiting Taiwan. Tourists who visited Taiwan and had tasted the bun would blog about it. The wait to buy a hujiao bing is notoriously long during peak hours at any vendor, the average wait is usually 30 minutes minimum. Customers also always buy in batches due to the long wait in line. When the vendor sells out and runs out of ingredients they usually close shop for the day instead of restocking their ingredients to make more buns.
