= 2moro =

Taiwanese musical duo

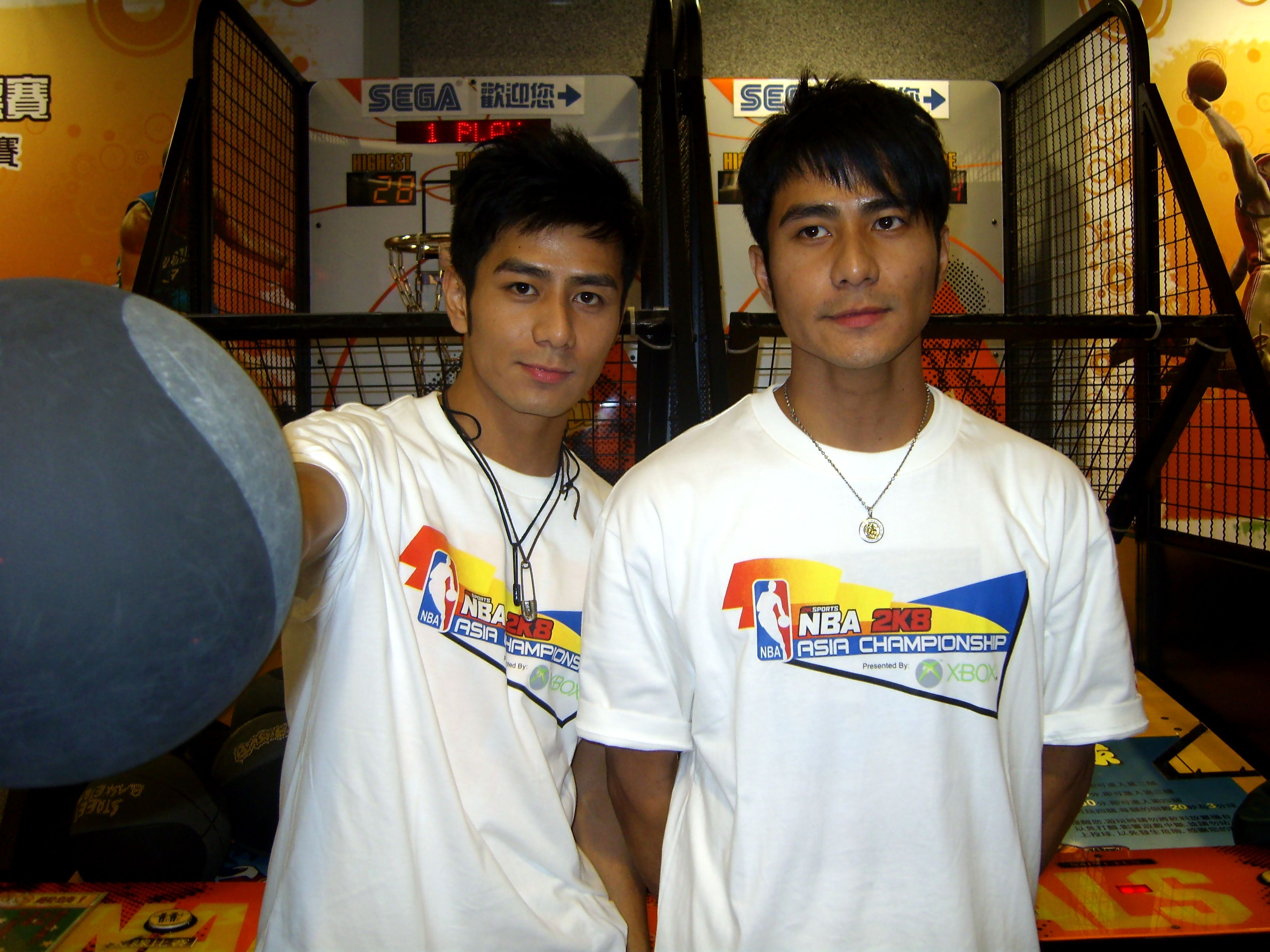
- 2moro in 2007

Background information
- Born: 31 December 1981 (age 43); Taiwan
- Occupation(s): Singers, Actors, Hosts
- Years active: 2006–present
- Musical career
- Origin: Taiwan
- Genres: Mandopop
- Labels: Rock Records
- Members: Anthony Guo; Angus Guo

2moro is a Taiwanese boyband, whose members are identical twins Anthony Guo (郭彥均) and Angus Guo (郭彥甫). The twins are graduates from Taipei Physical Education College.

The twins got their first taste of stardom in their third year of school, when an advertising company was seeking two similar-looking persons for the filming of a sportswear commercial, and found them a good choice. Before recording their first album, they had worked with female group S.H.E in the film Reaching For The Stars (真命天女) and with Singaporean actors in the Mediacorp drama production Rainbow Connections (舞出彩虹).

They released their first album, Twins' First Disc (雙胞胎的初回盤), on 6 January 2006.

Both brothers are co-host a variety show 食尚玩家(Super Taste) on TVBS Entertainment Channel.

== Discography ==
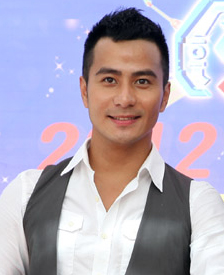
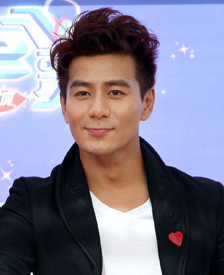
2moro on 7 December 2012
- 2006: 2moro
- 2006: 2 More Loves
