= King Kong Lee =

Taiwanese actor and comedian (born 1981)

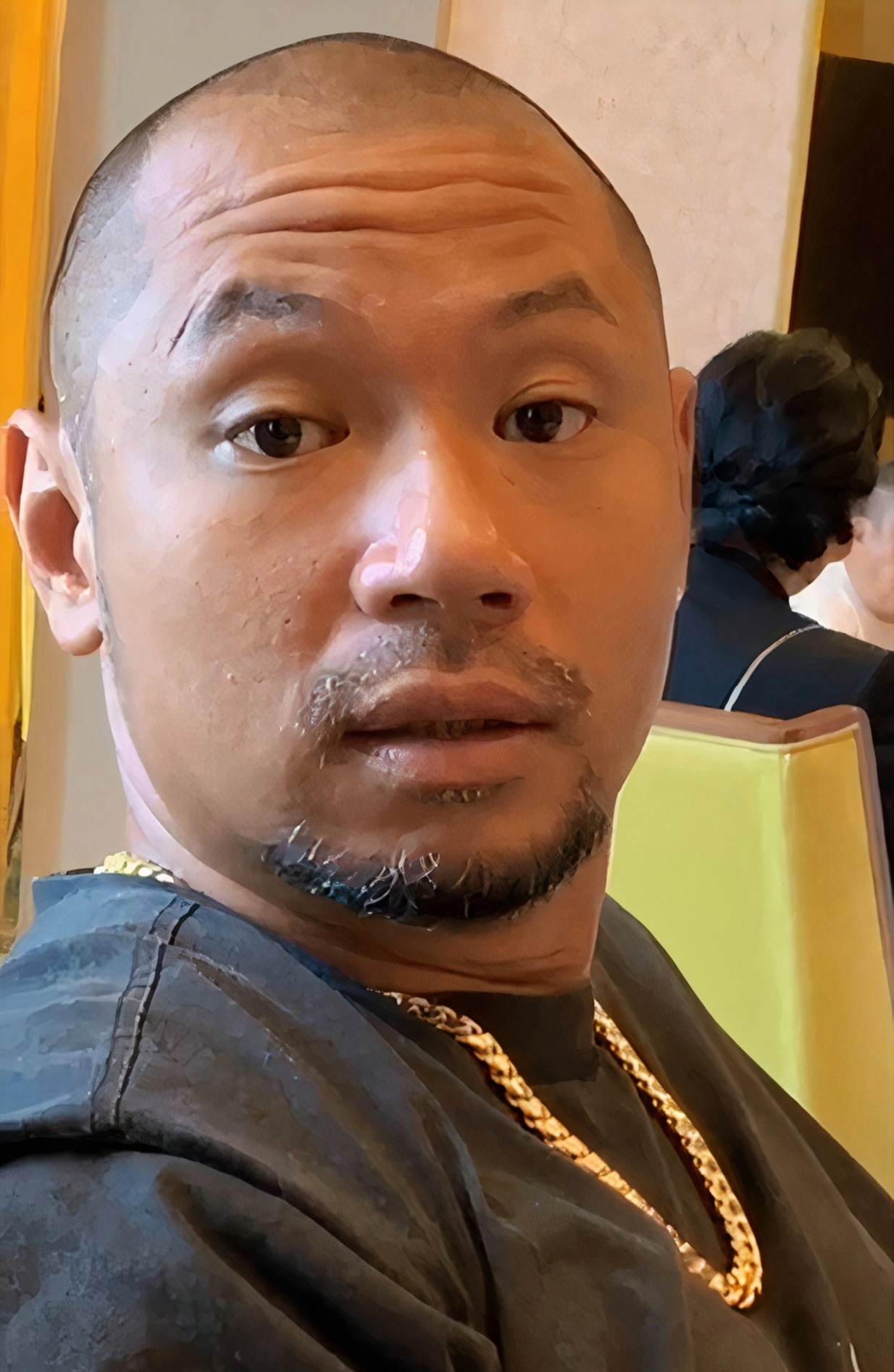
- Lee in 2019
- Born: Lee Hsin-chiao; 19 January 1981 (age 45); Taiwan
- Occupations: Actor; comedian
- Years active: 2002–present

King Kong Lee
- Traditional Chinese: 李金剛
- Simplified Chinese: 李金刚
Transcriptions
Standard Mandarin
- Hanyu Pinyin: Lǐ Jīngāng

Birth name
- Chinese: 李信樵
Transcriptions
Standard Mandarin
- Hanyu Pinyin: Lǐ Xìnqiáo

Lee Hsin-chiao (born 19 January 1981), known professionally as King Kong Lee, is a Taiwanese actor and comedian. He hosted the popular Super Trio series and has played some notable roles in some dramas such as No Regrets as a Japanese general. In 2021, he and his girlfriend Kelly Huang launched an online business selling Hong Kong–style chicken wings.

== Filmography ==
- The Sexy Guys (2019)
- The Incredible Monk 3 (2019)
- I Love You, You're Perfect, Now Change! (2019)
- She's a Man. He's a Woman (2019)
- Fake Partner (2018)
- Spicy Teacher (2018)
- The Incredible Monk – Dragon Return (2018)
- The Incredible Monk (2018)
- Never Too Late (2017)
- Yellow War (2017)
- Good Take! (2016)
- Buddy Cops (2016)
- From Vegas to Macau III (2016)
- Together (2013)
- Lan Kwai Fong 2 (2012)
- Mr. and Mrs. Gambler (2012)
- I Love Hong Kong 2012 (2012)
- Turning Point 2 (2011)
- Summer Love (2011)
- The Fortune Buddies (2011)
- Love is the Only Answer (2011)
- Marriage with a Liar (2010)
- The Stool Pigeon (2010)
- Break Up Club (2010)
- Ip Man (2008)
- Open to Midnight (2007)
- My Sassy Teacher (2006)
- Better than Sex (2002)

=== TVB dramas ===
- Justice Sung Begins (2024)
- Destination Nowhere (2017)
- No Reserve (2017)
- The Exorcist's Meter (2017)
- Love as a Predatory Affair (2016)
- Captain of Destiny (2015)
- Eye in the Sky (2015)
- Never Dance Alone (2014)
- Gilded Chopsticks (2014)
- Triumph in the Skies II (2013)
- King Maker (2012)
- Ghetto Justice II (2012)
- Let It Be Love (2012)
- Super Snoops (2011)
- No Regrets (2010)
- OL Supreme (2010)
- E.U. (2009)
- Express Boy (2005)
- Love Contract (2004)
- Lover of Herb (2004)
- Seventh Grade (2003)

=== Other TV series ===
- Guardian Angel 2018 Web Drama (2018 Shaw Brothers drama)
- Marry Me! (CTS, 2006)
- Ba Xing Bao Xi (八星報喜) (2005)
- Evil Spirit 05 (GTV, 2005)
- Beauty Lady (CTS, 2004)
- Dance of the Heart (2004)
- Tian Xia Wu Shuang (CTV, 2002)
- Spicy Teacher (CTS, 2002)
