= Snow Suen =

Hong Kong actress (born 1982)

- 孫慧雪
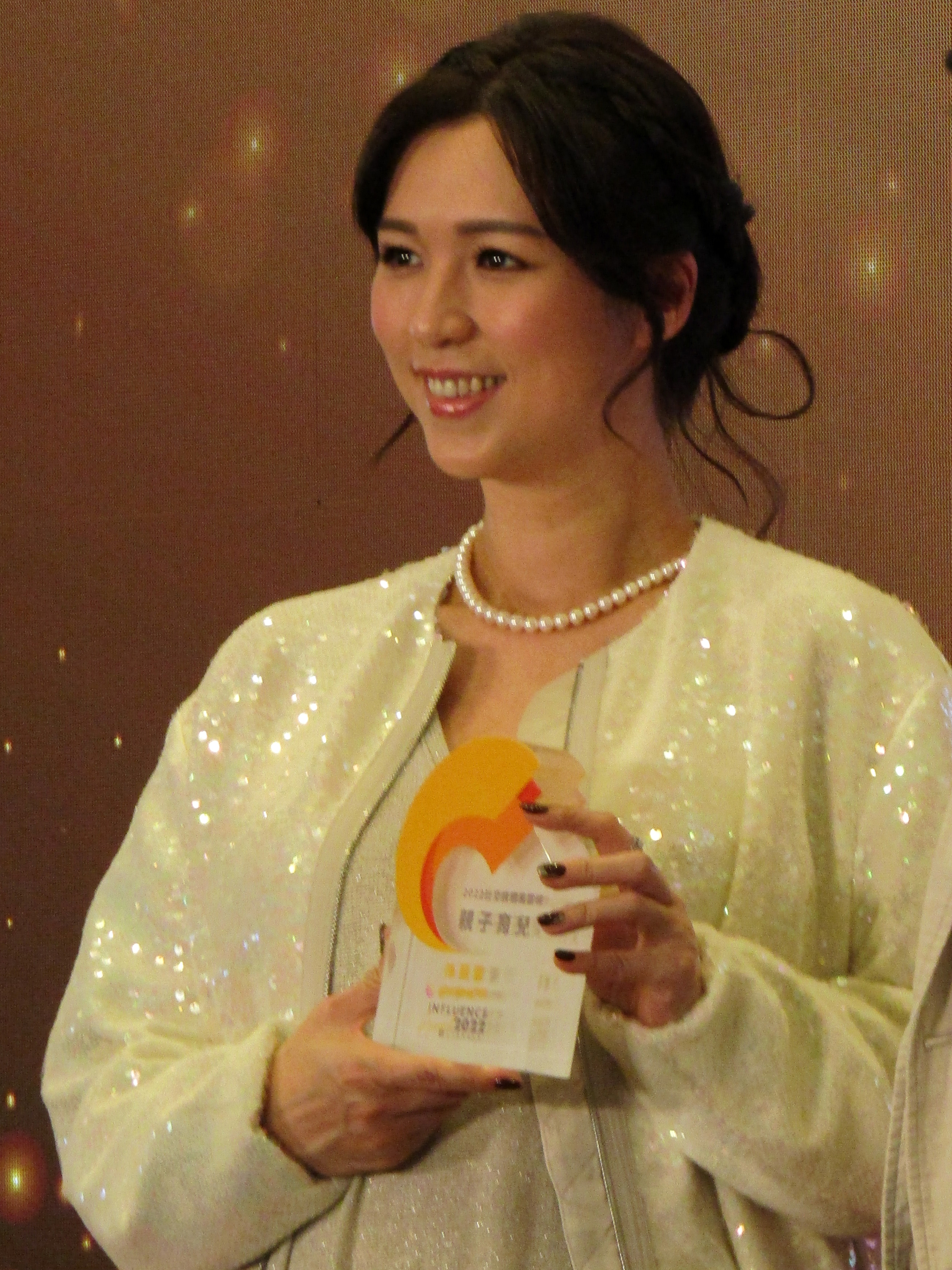
- Suen in February 2023
- Born: 11 July 1982 (age 44); British Hong Kong
- Occupations: Actress; model
- Years active: 2006–present
- Notable work: Triumph in the Skies II; Presumed Accidents; Threesome; Death by Zero
- Spouse: Edwin Lo (m. 2016)
- Children: 2 sons

Chinese name
- Traditional Chinese: 孫慧雪
- Simplified Chinese: 孙慧雪
Transcriptions
Standard Mandarin
- Hanyu Pinyin: Sūn huì xuě
Yue: Cantonese
- Jyutping: Syun1 Wai6 Syut3

Snow Suen (Chinese: 孫慧雪; born 11 July 1982) is a Hong Kong television actress and model. She was formerly contracted to TVB and left in 2023.

== Early life ==
Suen was born on 11 July 1982, and grew up in North Point. Her parents divorced when she was young and she was raised by her grandmother. She graduated from City University of Hong Kong with a bachelor's degree in linguistics.

== Career ==
Suen took part in TVB's 2006 artist training course. After signing an artist contract with TVB, Suen made her acting debut in the 2006 drama Welcome to the House. Suen was initially just acting as a cameo in most dramas. Afterwards, she began to receive supporting roles since mid to late 2010s, including Presumed Accidents and Threesome, etc.

In October 2023, Suen announced on her social media that she had already left TVB.

Suen received a Best Actress award for her appearance in the microfilm Egg Waffles (雞蛋仔).

== Selected filmography ==
=== TV dramas ===
Year	Title	Role	Notes
2006	Welcome to the House	Yiu Yiu (瑤瑤)	Cameo
2006	Maidens' Vow	Multiple Different Roles	Cameo
2007–2008	Best Selling Secrets	Multiple Different Roles	Cameo
2008	Moonlight Resonance	Yan Hung (young) (年青殷紅)	Cameo
2008–2010	Off Pedder	Multiple Different Roles	Cameo
2009	Burning Flame III	Sha Yuen-kee (沙宛淇)	Cameo
2009	Born Rich	Katy	Cameo
2010	OL Supreme	Journalist	Ep.14
2010	Can’t Buy Me Love	Chun-yee	Cameo
2010	No Regrets	Ng Lai-sim / Mrs. Yeung (young) (年青楊吳麗嬋)	Cameo
2010	Some Day	Lucy	Cameo
2010	Gun Metal Grey	Multiple Different Roles	Cameo
2011	Show Me the Happy	Multiple Different Roles	Cameo
2011	Be Home for Dinner	Multiple Different Roles	Cameo
2011	Only You	Maid	Ep.22-23
2011	Til Love Do Us Lie	Multiple Different Roles	Cameo
2012–2015	Come Home Love	Multiple Different Roles	Cameo
2012	L'Escargot	Mrs. Cheuk	Ep.5, 10–20
2012	No Good Either Way	Joan	Cameo
2013	Slow Boat Home	Ip Wing-shan (young) (年青葉詠珊)	Cameo
2013	Triumph in the Skies II	Dona	Supporting Role
2013	The Hippocratic Crush II	Luk Sau-ling (陸秀玲)	Cameo
2014	Swipe Tap Love	Alexis	Cameo
2015	The Fixer	Kei Kei (祈淇)	Supporting Role
2016	Love as a Predatory Affair	Jessica	Cameo
2016	Come Home Love: Dinner at 8	Gigi	Ep.18, 66, 74
2016	Presumed Accidents	Yeung Yin-oi (楊言愛)	Supporting Role
2018	Threesome	Dr. Bean Siu-dou (邊小豆)	Main Role
2020	Death by Zero	Yumi-Law Ka-yan (羅嘉欣)	Supporting Role
2021–2023	Come Home Love: Lo and Behold	Rachel Chu-yan (朱茵)	Supporting Role
2022	The Beauty of War	Lam Lam (琳琳)	Supporting Role

=== Films ===
Year	Title	Role	Notes/Ref.
2020	You Are the One	Ms. Sin (仙姐)	Main Role
