= Gemma Choi =

Hong Kong entertainer

- 蔡慧欣

Gemma Choi Wai-yan (Chinese: 蔡慧欣) is a former contract artist under Hong Kong TVB.

== Biography ==
Choi participated in the 2011 Miss Hong Kong Pageant and won the Outstanding Performance Award, and she is one of the five beauties with higher votes in the "Most Champion Beauty" online voting event. At the end of the contest, she said she planned to become a law student but discontinued her studies to start her career in the entertainment field. Choi made an appearance as a beach volleyball player in the TVB drama Divas in Distress.

== Personal life ==
In September 2017, she married her boyfriend, Keeman. In February 2018, she gave birth to a daughter. She gave birth to a son in December 2019.
