= Daddy Dearest (2016 TV series) =

Hong Kong television series

- Official poster
- Also known as: Super Daddy 爸B有話兒; Daddy Has Something to Say
- 超能老豆
- Genre: Modern, Comedy, Family
- Created by: Hong Kong Television Broadcasts Limited
- Written by: Lo Mei-wan
- Starring: Johnson Lee; Jason Chan Chi-san; Mandy Wong; Candice Chiu; Alice Chan; Jerry Ku
- Theme music composer: Alan Cheung
- Opening theme: Daddy (爸爸) by Hubert Wu
- Country of origin: Hong Kong
- Original language: Cantonese
- No. of episodes: 20

Production
- Executive producer: Catherine Tsang
- Producer: Poon Ka-tak
- Production location: Hong Kong
- Editor: Lo Mei-wan
- Camera setup: Multi camera
- Running time: 45 minutes
- Production company: TVB

Original release
- Network: Jade
- Release: 1 August – 26 August 2016

Related
- Between Love & Desire; Brother's Keeper II

Daddy Dearest
- Traditional Chinese: 超能老豆
- Simplified Chinese: 超能老豆
- Cantonese Yale: Chīunàng Lóuhdauh
- Literal meaning: "Super Daddy"
Transcriptions
Standard Mandarin
- Hanyu Pinyin: Chāonéng Lǎodòu
- Bopomofo: ㄔㄠ ㄋㄥˊ ㄌㄠˇㄉㄡˋ
Yue: Cantonese
- Yale Romanization: Chīunàng Lóuhdauh
- Jyutping: Ciu1nang4 Lou5dau6
- IPA: [tsʰíːu̯.nɐ̏ŋ lo̬u̯.tɐ̀u̯]

Daddy Dearest (Chinese: 超能老豆; literally "Super Daddy") is a 2016 Hong Kong modern family comedy television drama produced by Poon Ka-tak for TVB, starring Johnson Lee, Jason Chan Chi-san and Mandy Wong as the main leads. It premiered on August 1, 2016, airing every Monday to Friday on Hong Kong's TVB Jade, Malaysia's Astro On Demand and Australia's TVBJ channels during its 8:30-9:30 pm timeslot, concluding August 26, 2016 with a total of 20 episodes.

== Synopsis ==
Kuk Chi-keung (Johnson Lee) is an absentee father who boasts to his son, Kuk Tui-nam (Marcus Lo), his busy life because of his important business meetings and huge deal making. However, Chi-keung is really just an ordinary real-estate agent who cares more about work than spending time with his son. His work is so important to him that he would rather cancel his parental visits with Tui-nam and use his personal time to socialize with his boss. Chi-keung's inability to keep promises to his son has left him in a strained relationship with his ex-wife and her fiancé who have to make excuses to spare Tui-nam from disappointment. When his ex-wife leaves Hong Kong to get married and go on a honeymoon, Tui-nam is left in Chi-keung's care for an extended period of time. Jealous that his son is growing closer to his new step-father, Chi-keung takes the task of being a responsible father seriously. However, not being used to taking care of his son has left Chi-keung often overlooking his son's needs and feelings.

After seeing his client, Ophelia Chu Lai-fa (Mandy Wong), a teacher at a learning center, teach Tui-nam how to do homework, Chi-keung decides to enroll Tui-nam in Ophelia's learning center instead of having Tui-nam tag along with him to work. When Ophelia and her landlord find out Chi-keung had doctored their rental lease in order to complete a sale, they file a complaint against Chi-keung. Due to his underhanded actions to complete a sale Tse-keung's real-estate license is suspended for 6 months. While under suspension, Chi-keung notices Ophelia's learning center struggling because she is too nice to her students by refusing to charge extra for overtime and collect tuition when a student cannot pay. After a teaching staff quits and threatens to take the learning centre's students with her, Ophelia asks Chi-keung, who is business minded, to advise her on how to save the learning center. Chi-keung instead suggests he become a business partner at her learning center. In exchange Ophelia advises Chi-keung on how to be a caring parent to Tui-nam, who she notices is often neglected due to his independence.

Marius Sheung Nim-shu (Jason Chan) is also an absentee father, but unlike Chi-keung, his long business trips take him away from his family. As an architect, his career takes him away from his family for months. However, he is always thinking of his family and can't wait to get back to them. Even though he is a loving dad to his kids, Marius's hectic work life causes him to miss out on important events in his children's life and getting both his daughter, Sheung Yat, and son, Sheung Yi, birthdays mixed up. After being lectured by his academic minded father, Marius becomes concerned for his son's (who is entering elementary school soon) academics. Marius requests time-off from work, but his boss depends on him and refuses to allow him any time-off, even suggesting Marius take his entire family with him on his next business trip. Feeling his son is more important, Marius quits his job and decides that for the next 6 months he will concentrate solely on finding the right school for his son.

Chi-keung and Marius first meet when the two fight for the same robotic toy for their sons. The two meet again when Marius joins Ophelia's learning center as a part-time tutor in order to help his son.

== Cast ==
=== The Kuk family ===
- Li Shing-cheong as Kuk Shun-chiu (谷順潮)

Kuk Chi-keung's father. Kuk Tui-nam's grandfather. Chan Mei-lin's husband.

- Deborah Poon as Chan Mei-lin (陳美蓮)

Kuk Shun-chiu's much younger second wife. Kuk Chi-keung's step-mother.

- Johnson Lee as Kuk Chi-keung (谷自強)

Ku Tui-nam's father and Bella Fung Yuet-na's ex-husband. He is a real-estate agent and is the top salesman at his branch because he is very dedicated to his work and he uses underhanded tactics to steal accounts from other salesmen at his branch. He looks after his son for an extended period of time when his ex-wife gets remarried. Due to doctoring a lease agreement without the homeowners consent, his real-estate license is suspended for six month. Unable to find work he decides to invest in Ophelia's struggling learning center.

- Marcus Lo as Kuk Tui-nam (谷莜楠)

Kuk Chi-keung and Bella Fung Yuet-na's young son. He is left in extended care of his father when his mother marries her new husband, Pacino. Living with his father, he has to learn to fend for himself since his father is not used to caring for him and does not understand his needs.

=== The Chu family ===
- Alice Chan as Judy Chu Lai-sin (諸麗仙)

Ophelia Chu Lai-fa's elder sister. She is the CEO of their learning centers and goes from city to city to opening new learning centers without realizing their business is struggling.

- Mandy Wong as Ophelia Chu Lai-fa (諸麗花)

Judy Chu Lai-sin's younger sister. She manages her elder sister's Hong Kong learning center. She meets Kuk Chi-keung when he is the real-estate agent that shows her an apartment for rent. Integrity is very important to her and she shows Chi-keung how to be a better person when he is in the presence of his son, Tui-nam.

=== The Sheung family ===
- Pat Poon as Sheung Sun (常新)

Marius Sheung Nim-shu's father. Carrie Ho Lok-chi's father in-law. Sheung Yat's and Yi's grandfather. He is a retired Chinese Medical physician. Academics is very important to him. Wanting his grandson Yi to get into a good elementary school, he gets a job at that school in hope that his connections will get his grandson in.

- Jason Chan Chi-san as Marius Sheung Nim-shu (常念書)

Sheung Sun's son. Carrie Ho Lok-chi's husband. Sheung Yat's and Yi's father. He is a successful architect. His career takes him away from his family for extended periods making him often miss out on important events in his children's life. Worried about his son, Yi, he quits his job to concentrate on making sure his son gets into a good school.

- Candice Chiu as Carrie Ho Lok-chi (何樂姿)

Marius Sheung Nim-shu's wife. Sheung Yat's and Yi's mother. Sheung Sun's daughter in-law. She is a former physical therapist who gave up her career in order to take care of her children and look after the home due to her husband's demanding job.

- Bianca Chan as Sheung Yat (常逸)

Marius and Carrie's first born child. Sheung Sun's granddaughter. Yi's older sister. She is academically smart and receives praises from her grandfather. Her family nicknames her Ah Yat (which means "one" in Cantonese).

- Chan Pak-hei as Sheung Yi (常懿)

Marius and Carrie's younger child. Sheung Sun's grandson. Yat's little brother. He is shy and an introvert. He is not as academically smart and is often compared to his sister. His family nicknames him Ah Yi (which means "two" in Cantonese).

=== Learning Center staff ===
- Carat Cheung as Mak Ka-ka (麥家嘉)

A teacher at Ophelia's leaning center. Aware of the learning center's struggles she quits her job and steals the students to open her own learning center. After getting into problems with her new boss, she becomes unemployed and begs Judy Chu Lei San to give her another chance to work at their center. Having pity because she has to care for her little child, Judy agrees to rehire.

- Janice Shum as Teacher Si (施老師)
- Kenny Chan as Teacher Chan (陳老師)
- Kanice Lau as Teacher Lam (林老師)
- Ice Chow as Teacher Yeung (楊老師)
- Kimmi Tsui as Wing
- So Lai Ming as Sa (Sa姐)

=== Real-estate staff ===
- Jerry Ku as Stone Sek Dong (石冬)

Ku Tse-keung's best friend and colleague. Sek Dong is the worst real-estate agent at his branch. Sek Dong depends on Tse-keung's completed sales contracts, which Tse-keung passes to his friend, to survive at work.

- Billy Cheung as Michael

The boss of the real-estate firm Tse-keung works at. He is friendly and nice to Tse-keung until Tse-keung's real-estate license is suspended.

- Mandy Lam as Helen

Tse-keung's work rival and enemy at the same real-estate firm. Tse-keung often mocks her because she has to leave work early or on time to care for her child. He also steals her accounts when she is not at the office. She takes over all of Tse-keung's accounts when his real-estate license is suspended.

- Bob Cheung as Real-estate employee (地產經紀)

Tse-keung's immature colleague. He is nicknamed Kwok Fu-sing (郭富城; Hong Kong singer Aaron Kwok's Chinese name) because of his resembles to the singer.

- Milkson Fong as Real-estate employee (地產經紀)

Tse-keung's other immature colleague.

=== Physical Therapy center ===
- Henry Lo as Kwok Jo-hong (郭早康)
- King Lam as Si Hing (施興)
- Ceci So as Brenda Wong Fan-nuen (王芬暖)
- Kirby Lam as Lam Siu-ping (林少萍)
- Alan Tam Kwan-lun as Hung Wing-leung (洪永良)
- Joan Lee as To Kit-yee (杜潔兒)

=== Extended cast ===
- Snow Suen as Bella Fung Yuet-na (馮月娜)

Ku Tse-keung's ex-wife. Ku Tui-nam's mother. Pacino's newly wed wife. Due to getting married and honeymooning she has to leave her son with her ex-husband for an extended period of time. She and Tse-keung have a strained relation because he is unable to keep his promises to their son. Being used to Tse-keung's unreliable behavior she tests him and waits for him to fail at taking care of their son.

- Brian Burrell as Pacino

Bella Fung Yuet-na's newly wed husband. Ku Tui-nam's new step-father. Ku Tse-keung doesn't like him and nicknames him Bat-chi-lo (白痴佬; "idiot" in English and Chinese homophone to the pronunciation of his name). Due to Tse-keung always being absent from Tui-nam's life, Pacino has had to take over as a father figure to Tui-nam, which Tse-keung becomes aware of and becomes jealous of.

- Toby Chan as Pat

Marius' ex-secretary. She renews her contact with Marius and gets Ku Tse-keung to wrongly think Marius is having a secret affair behind the family's back. She just wants attention because her marriage is not loving and unique. She does not care that her child is very young and tries to commit suicide, but Marius and Tse-keung save her.

- Joe Junior as Mr. Kong (龔先生)
- Lo Mang as Rocky

Ku Tse-keung's former real-estate client. Owner of an import logistic company. When Tse-keung's real-estate license is suspended and Tse-keung is out of work Rocky hires him as a shipment delivery person.

- Adam Ip as Lee Seung-yau (李相佑)
- Aaryn Cheung as Dave Lee Man-ko (李敏高)
- Fanny Lee as Mrs. Cheung (張太)

Ophelia's landlord. Ku Tse-keung's client who filed a complaint against him because Tse-keung doctored her rental lease agreement between her and Ophelia.

== Development ==
- The costume fitting ceremony was held together on August 5, 2015, at 12:30 pm Tseung Kwan O TVB City Studio One.
- The blessing ceremony was held on September 22, 2015, at 2:30 pm Tseung Kwan O TVB City Studio sixteen.
- Daddy Dearest was originally scheduled to premiere on March 28, 2016, to take over TVB's 8:30-9:30 pm timeslot following after Short End of the Stick. The broadcast schedule was changed two weeks before the drama was to premiere with The Last Healer In Forbidden City premiering on March 28, 2016. Daddy Dearest was then pushed back to premiere after The Last Healer In Forbidden City on April 25, 2016.
- Due to concerns with ratings, Daddy Dearest was pushed back further with My Dangerous Mafia Retirement Plan premiering on April 25, 2016, and Presumed Accidents premiering on May 30, 2016.
- In June 2016, the series was pushed back for the fourth time to air on August 1 during TVB's 2016 Amazing Summer. The Chinese title was also changed from 爸B有話兒; literally "Daddy Has Something to Say" to 超能老豆; literally "Super Daddy".

== Viewership ratings ==
Timeslot (HKT)	#	Week	Episode(s)	Average points	Peaking points
Mon – Fri (8:30-9:30 pm); 20:30–21:30	1	01 – 05 Aug 2016	1 – 5	24	30
Mon – Fri (8:30-9:30 pm); 20:30–21:30	2	08 – 12 Aug 2016	6 – 10	22	
Mon – Fri (8:30-9:30 pm); 20:30–21:30	3	15 – 19 Aug 2016	11 – 15	21	
Mon – Fri (8:30-9:30 pm); 20:30–21:30	4	22 – 26 Aug 2016	16 – 20	23	
Total average				22.5	

== International broadcast ==
Network	Country	Airing Date	Timeslot
Astro On Demand	Malaysia	August 1, 2016	Monday – Friday 8:30 – 9:15 pm
TVBJ	Australia	August 1, 2016	Monday – Friday 7:15 – 8:15 pm
Starhub TV	Singapore	October 3, 2016	Monday – Friday 8:00 – 9:00 pm

== Awards and nominations ==
Year	Ceremony	Category	Nominee	Result
2016	StarHub TVB Awards	My Favourite TVB Male TV Character	Johnson Lee	Nominated
2016	StarHub TVB Awards	My Favourite TVB Male TV Character	Jason Chan	Nominated
2016	StarHub TVB Awards	My Favourite TVB Theme Song	"Daddy" by Hubert Wu	Nominated
2016	TVB Star Awards Malaysia	My Favourite TVB Actress in a Supporting Role	Candice Chiu	Nominated
2016	TVB Star Awards Malaysia	My Favourite Top 15 TVB Drama Characters	Johnson Lee	Nominated
2016	TVB Star Awards Malaysia	My Favourite Top 15 TVB Drama Characters	Jason Chan	Nominated
2016	TVB Star Awards Malaysia	My Favourite Top 15 TVB Drama Characters	Candice Chiu	Nominated
2016	TVB Anniversary Awards	Best Series	Daddy Dearest	Nominated
2016	TVB Anniversary Awards	Best Actor	Johnson Lee	Nominated
2016	TVB Anniversary Awards	Most Popular Series Song	"Daddy" by Hubert Wu	Nominated
