= Brutally Young =

Hong Kong crime thriller television series

- 十八年後的終極告白
- Genre: Crime; Detective
- Created by: Simon Wong Wai-yan
- Written by: Lui Sau-lin
- Directed by: Calvin Leung Ting-hin; Kwun Kwok-wai; Lee Kin-wo; Tse Ho-yeung
- Starring: Shaun Tam; Mandy Wong; Joel Chan; Vivien Yeo; Dominic Lam; Anthony Ho; Candice Chiu; Elvina Kong; Griselda Yeung; Mary Hon; Auston Lam
- Theme music composer: Dominic Chu
- Opening theme: Confessions by Fred Cheng
- Ending theme: I Need You Every Minute by Joey Thye
- Composer: George Lam
- Country of origin: Hong Kong
- Original language: Cantonese
- No. of episodes: 20

Production
- Producer: Simon Wong Wai-yan
- Production location: Hong Kong
- Running time: 45 minutes
- Production company: TVB

Original release
- Network: TVB Jade
- Release: 20 April – 15 May 2020

Brutally Young
- Traditional Chinese: 十八年後的終極告白
Transcriptions

Brutally Young (Chinese: 十八年後的終極告白) is a crime and thriller television drama produced by TVB. It stars Shaun Tam, Mandy Wong, Joel Chan and Vivien Yeo as the main leads. Simon Wong Wai-yan serves as the producer. The series made its premiere on TVB Jade on April 20, 2020.

This show was regarded very highly by its audience, who praised the actors for their suspenseful acting. The series received up to 8.7 points on Douban.

A reboot of this series was shot in 2021, and made its premiere on 30 May 2022.

== Synopsis ==
18 years ago, a group of seven students were involved in the death of a gangster, later burying him in the woods. Today as adults, each of them walk their own path and professions, but the discovery of the bones belonging to their former classmate forces them to reunite and find a way to keep the police from knowing their secret.

== Cast and characters ==
The Incident

- Date of the incident: August 9, 2000, from afternoon to evening.
- Location: Daxi'ao Barbecue Area

=== Main characters ===
- Shaun Tam as Sam Lam Long-sang (林朗生), a senior accountant, one of the seven men involved, and ultimately the series ultimate villain. Born in 1982, Sam graduated with five points in the high school entrance examination in 2000. He was idolized by Lai Kwok-Ming, who claimed that he was killing Sam's friends to protect Sam. Since the incident 18 years ago, Sam has become an accountant. He was threatened by Yat Gor about the incident in Episode 1. He started investigating the case and at the same time, also cover up his own crimes. He was kidnapped by Lai Kwok-Ming and held on a boat in Episode 14. In defense, Sam killed him and set fire to the boat to destroy evidence. To prevent his girlfriend, Madam Yuen from finding out about his crimes, Sam committed fraud in Episode 17. While trying to escape in Episode 20, he tried to kill Yuen Jing, but accidentally stabbed Yat Gor instead. He was convicted for manslaughter, illegally dumping of a dead body and fraud and was sentenced to 38 years and 8 months in jail. Due to his good behavior, he had one-third of the sentence cut and was released from prison in 2044.
- Mandy Wong as Yuen Lai-ken (阮麗瑾), better known as Madam Yuen, a police inspector who heads her own crime squad in Kowloon. After the death of Ghost Keung, she begins investigating the incident from 18 years ago.
- Joel Chan as Sum King-yat (沈敬一), better known as Yat Gor (一哥), a gangster who leads a faction under Uncle Ken and rival of Coffin. He is Sam's classmate and one of the seven men involved. He was believed to be the murderer in the incident before it was dispelled. He was a righteous man who would stand up for the vulnerable. He is also Tse Ka-Sin's boyfriend. In Episode 16, Lam Long-Sam confessed to him that he killed Chen Shuxian by mistake. Upon knowing that Coffin kidnapped Ka-Sin in Episode 19, King-Yat was almost let into a trap by Coffin. In the ensuring car chase, King-Yat T-boned Coffin's car, thereby killing him. In Episode 16, He was stabbed and killed by Long-Sam in Episode 20, while trying to prevent the latter from killing Yuen Jing.
- Vivien Yeo as Tse Ka-sin (謝家倩), Chubby Foo's younger sister and a deaf bartender who has had a crush on Yat Gor since childhood.

=== Supporting characters ===
- Dominic Lam as Yuen Chun (阮進), better known as Yuen Sir (阮Sir), a military surplus store owner and Madam Yuen's father. He was also Zombie's father and the seven men's teacher in high school. Wanting revenge for his son's death, he takes great measures to track down his son's killer.
- Anthony Ho as Tse Ka-foo (謝家富), better known as Chubby Foo (肥仔富), a Japanese cook and Ka-sin's elder brother. He is one of the seven men and often helps Kit-ching. He marries Kit-ching in Episode 20.
- Candice Chiu as Joanne Wong Chung-kwan (王頌君), an investment bank manager and Sam's girlfriend, though they later break up due to a case involving illegal matters with a cement company.
- Elvina Kong as Chan Suk-han (陳淑嫻), a housewife, Madam Yuen's mother and Yuen Chun's wife.
- Griselda Yeung as Leung Kit-ching (梁潔貞), a tailor and Ghost Keung's widow. After her husband's death, she struggles to raise her own son alongside handing her tailoring business, but gets assistance from Chubby Foo.
- Mary Hon as Kwong Bo-chu (鄺寶珠), Sam's mother.
- Auston Lam as Fung Wing-hing (馮永興), better known as Chui Shui / Blow (吹水), a real estate agent and one of the seven men.
- Gordon Siu as Lee Keung (李強), Ghost Keung (鬼仔強), a driver and Leung Kit-ching's husband who is very superstitious. He is one of the seven men and is killed by Lai Kwok-ming in Episode 1 while trying to take him to confession.
- David Do as Sze Man-fu (施文虎), better known as Tiger, a butcher and Chiu Yuk Tai's husband. He is one of the seven men and is killed by Lai Kwok-ming in Episode 10 when he discovers Lai Kwok-ming spying on his wife.
- Nicole Wan as Chiu Yuk-tai (趙玉娣), a butcher and Tiger's wife. She is killed by Lai Kwok-ming in episode 11 while trying to find Sam.
- Louis Szeto as Lai Sai-tat (黎世達), better known as Egg Tart (蛋撻), a former waiter at a Tai Tung Tsuen restaurant and one of the seven men. He became paralyzed by being pushed down the stairs by Lai Kwok-ming in 2009 while trying to give information to Yuen Chun. He died in the ICU one year after the men were prosecuted due to the succumbing of his wounds.
- Kevin Tong as Lai Kwok-ming (賴國明), a security guard working at Sam's office building. He is the main villain and the killer of Zombie. In order to prevent his crimes from coming to light, he "helped" Sam by killing everyone who would potentially leak out information about the case. He attempted to kidnap Sam by hacking into his phone and using Carfentanil to knock him unconscious in Episode 12. He kidnapped Chen Shuxian and subsequently tied her into a suitcase. He also kidnapped Sam and tried to explain his intentions to the latter. He was severely injured by Sam and later burned to death in Episode 15.
- Oman Lam as Wu Kai-sze (胡啟思), better known as Zombie (喪屍), a gangster and Yuen Chun's illegitimate son. He was killed by Lai Kwok-ming in 2000.
- Ball Mang as Jackie Choi Wai-lan (蔡慧蘭), a salesperson and Ka-sin's good friend.
- Ken Law as Kwan Tai-shen (關泰臣), Yat Gor's loyal assistant.
- Stephen Ho as Tsui Yau-chai (徐友齊), better known as Coffin (棺材), a gangster and leader of a faction under Uncle Ken and Yat Gor's rival. He was T-boned and subsequently killed by King-Yat in Episode 19.
- Shu-fung Cheng as Au-yeung Ken (歐陽鏡), better known as Uncle Ken (鏡叔), the gangster leader of Yat Gor and Coffin.
- Milkson Fong as Tiu Chai Fau (跳掣輝), Coffin's assistant.
