= Paisley Wu =

Hong Kong singer (born 1971)

- Born: 胡之洋; 12 November 1971 (age 54); Shanghai, China
- Occupations: Singer, tv host
- Years active: 1994–present
- Spouse: Pal Sinn (m. 2008)

Chinese name
- Traditional Chinese: 胡蓓蔚
- Simplified Chinese: 胡蓓蔚
Transcriptions
Standard Mandarin
- Hanyu Pinyin: hú bèi wèi
Yue: Cantonese
- Jyutping: wu4 bui3 wai3
- Musical career
- Genres: C-pop (Cantopop, Mandopop), C-rock, alternative pop
- Labels: Go East (1996–1998); J-Sonic (2007–2008)
- Website: paisley.j-sonic.net

Paisley Wu (胡蓓蔚; born 12 November 1971) is a Hong Kong singer and television presenter. She was first discovered by Tats Lau of Tat Ming Pair, and has released 3 albums and 1 EP since the start of her music career in the mid-90s. Since the 2000s, she is mainly known as a TV host on music programmes for TVB.

== Biography ==
Paisley Wu's formative years were spent in Shanghai, where she received musical training in Italian opera. She later moved to San Francisco where she studied R&B and jazz. Her first release was a jazz album in 1994, which was sung in her native Mandarin and produced by Tats Lau. In 1996, she signed with Musician Ltd, a short-lived sublabel of Polygram Hong Kong which was then home to the newly reformed Tat Ming Pair, and during this period released music that showed a more alternative-rock influence. Her first and only album (就係...) on the label was released to mixed reception in 1997. She was often unfavourably dubbed as a Faye Wong wannabe, though she has personally acknowledged the latter's influence in later years.

Wu released an easy-listening Mandarin album in 2002, before becoming a regular TV host for various music programmes on TVB and TVB8. In late 2007, she made a brief return to the Hong Kong music scene with the EP Don't Think Just Do, which featured her first ever number one single, "Letting Go."

Throughout her career, Wu has collaborated and recorded with Tats Lau, Jan Lamb, and Anthony Wong Yiu Ming in the mid-90s, as well as Lazy Mutha Fucka and Edison Chen in 2004.

== Personal life ==
In 2008, Wu married Pal Sinn, a former member of 80s Hong Kong rock band Blue Jeans and a frequent songwriter on her albums.

Wu is best friends with Myolie Wu, Nancy Wu, Elaine Yiu, Mandy Wong and Selena Lee. They had formed the friendship group “胡說八道會” and had filmed a travel show together.

Due to their common interest in long-distance running, Wu along with Benjamin Yuen, Joel Chan, Brian Tse, Jack Wu, Nancy Wu, Elaine Yiu, Selena Lee and Mandy Wong formed the group “Crazy Runner”.

== Discography ==
=== Studio albums ===
- 1994: Today, Tomorrow, Overmorrow (今天明天後天)
- 1997: This is... (就係...)
- 2002: Freeze Frame Love (停格愛情)

=== Extended plays ===
- 2007: Don't Think Just Do [EP]

=== Soundtracks ===
- 1997: Downtown Torpedoes OST (神偷諜影電影原聲大碟)

=== Other appearances ===
- 1996: "The End" (了了) & "My God" (我的天) with Tats Lau on Anaesthesia (麻木)
- 1996: "Guest" (客人) with Anthony Wong
- 1997: "A Forbidden Fruit Everyday" (每日一禁果) with Tat Ming Pair on Long Live! Long Live! Long Long Live! (萬歲萬歲萬萬歲演唱會)
- 1997: "Sweet Sweet Honey" (甜甜蜜) with Jan Lamb on Discotheque (的士夠格)
- 2000: "Forget that He is He" (忘記他是他) with DJ Tommy on Scratch Rider
- 2004: "War" (戰爭) with Edison Chen, Han Jin Tan and MC Yan on Please Steal This Album
- 2008: "Ardent Greetings" (酷拜) with Hins Cheung, Kay Tse, Ivana Wong, Kevin Kwan and Louis Cheung

== Filmography ==
=== Television ===
Year	English title	Original title	Role	Notes
2004–present	Global Rhythm	無間音樂	Host / Herself	
2007–2009	Jade Solid Gold	勁歌金曲	Co-host / Herself	
2010	Some Day	天天天晴	Ms. Wong (cameo)	TVB series
2010	Don Juan De Mercado	情人眼裏高一D	Ngau Mei-Kwan (cameo)	TVB series
2012	Ghetto Justice II	怒火街頭II	Nancy	TVB series
2012	The Hippocratic Crush	On Call 36小時	To Ka-Man	TVB series
2013	Triumph in the Skies II	衝上雲霄II	Hana (cameo)	TVB series
2013	The Hippocratic Crush II	On Call 36小時II	To Ka-Man	TVB series
2017	My Ages Apart	誇世代	Sheung Ho Ching	TVB series
2022	Against Darkness	黯夜守護者		TVB series
2022	The Spectator	旁觀者		TVB series
2025	Love Virtually	虛擬情人	Natasha Mak Lai-sa	TVB series
