= Mandy Wong =

Hong Kong actress (born 1982)

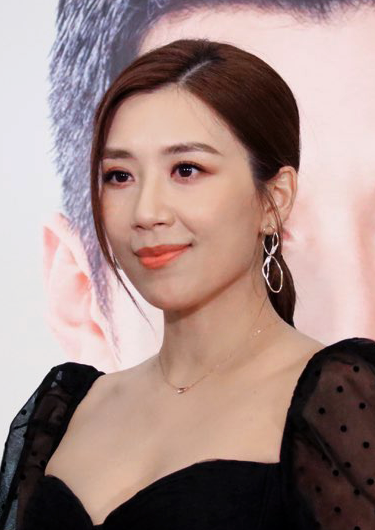
- Wong in 2021
- Born: 21 December 1982 (age 43); British Hong Kong
- Occupation: Actress
- Years active: 2007–present
- Notable work: L'Escargot; The Hippocratic Crush series The Exorcist's Meter series Threesome
- Spouse: Anthony Jim (m. 2023)
- Awards: TVB Anniversary Awards – Most Improved Female Artiste; 2012 L'Escargot, The Hippocratic Crush, Tiger Cubs, Divas in Distress; Favourite TVB Actress in Malaysia; 2018 Threesome; Favourite TVB Actress in Singapore; 2018 Threesome MY AOD Favourites Awards – My Favourite Most Promising Female Artiste; 2012 L'Escargot StarHub TVB Awards – Most Improved TVB Artiste; 2013 People's Choice Television Awards – People's Choice Best Actress; 2018 Threesome Hong Kong Television Awards – Best Leading Actress in Drama Series; 2018 Threesome

Chinese name
- Traditional Chinese: 黃智雯
- Simplified Chinese: 黄智雯
Transcriptions
Standard Mandarin
- Hanyu Pinyin: Huáng Zhìwén
Yue: Cantonese
- Jyutping: Wong4 Zi3 Man4
- Website: YouTube Channel

Mandy Wong Chi-Man (born 21 December 1982) is a Hong Kong actress previously contracted to TVB. She is currently under the management of Supreme Art Entertainment.

Wong began her acting career by participating in the Miss Hong Kong 2007 beauty pageant, where she was placed among the top 5 finalists. She gained recognition with her performance in the 2012 dramas L'Escargot and The Hippocratic Crush, winning the Most Improved Female Artiste award at the 2012 TVB Anniversary Awards. In 2018, Wong earned critical acclaim for her performance in the legal comedy Threesome, winning the Favourite TVB Actress awards in both Malaysia and Singapore at the 2018 TVB 51st Anniversary Gala.

== Early and personal life ==
Born in Hong Kong, Mandy Wong was raised in a single-parent household and graduated from Cognitio College (Kowloon). Wong is very fond of dancing and has been practising since her teenage years. She had also achieved grade 8 on the piano. She has an older sister, Cathy Wong, who was a former English language specialist at King's Glory Education Centre. Their mother is the owner of a cosmetics boutique in Wan Chai.

Wong is best friends with Myolie Wu, Nancy Wu, Paisley Wu, Elaine Yiu and Selena Lee. They had formed the friendship group "胡說八道會" and had filmed a travel show together. Another best friend of hers is Candice Chiu, whom Wong refers to as her "soul sister". Wong is also good friends with Benjamin Yuen, Kenneth Ma, Joel Chan, Vincent Wong, Him Law, Lai Lok-yi, Shaun Tam, Ali Lee, Venus Wong, Yoyo Chen and Nicholas Yuen due to collaborations in filming television dramas. She is good friends with The Exorcist's Meter co-actors Hubert Wu and Anthony Ho as well. They formed the friendship group "降魔的偷跳小隊".

Due to their common interest in long-distance running, Wong along with Benjamin Yuen, Joel Chan, Brian Tse, Jack Wu, Nancy Wu, Paisley Wu, Elaine Yiu and Selena Lee formed the group Crazy Runner.

Wong's boyfriend is Anthony Jim, a C-level of TSL Jewellery Ltd. They have been dating since 2012. On 5 October 2023, Wong announced their marriage via social media. "I always believed I’m a very lucky girl. I grew up in a warm and loving environment, and have always been surrounded by people who cherished me. I'm thankful for you," wrote Wong, who also included the hashtag #WeAreMarried.

== Career ==
=== 2008–2011: career beginning ===
As a former graduate of The Hong Kong Academy for Performing Arts, Mandy Wong worked as a flight attendant for three years before participating in the Miss Hong Kong 2007 beauty pageant, in which she was placed among the top 5 finalists. Wong was offered an artiste contract by TVB, upon graduating from its acting class in 2008, and debuted with an uncredited appearance in the sitcom Best Selling Secrets.

After two years of appearing in dramas as minor supporting roles, Wong received attention with her role as "So Fung-lin", the bespectacled younger sister of Myolie Wu's character in the 2009 comedy drama A Chip Off the Old Block. Impressed with her character portrayal, producer Poon Ka-tak cast Wong to portray "Cheng Siu-man", the timid younger sister of Flora Chan's character in the 2010 romantic comedy drama Suspects in Love, again receiving attention from netizens. To prepare for her role, Wong studied Maggie Cheung's performance in Police Cadet '84. Since then, she had frequently collaborated with producer Poon Ka-tak and had been cast in his dramas with major roles.

In 2011, Wong earned her first nomination for the Most Improved Female Artiste at the 2011 TVB Anniversary Awards.

=== 2012–2015: gaining recognition ===
In 2012, Wong's popularity further rose and was highly praised by netizens with her role as "Lau Siu-lan", the overbearing wife of Oscar Leung's character in the family drama L'Escargot, for which she won My Favourite Most Promising Female Artiste award at the 2012 MY AOD Favourites Awards. She also earned her first Best Supporting Actress nomination at the 2012 TVB Anniversary Awards and was placed among top 2. In the critical acclaimed medical drama The Hippocratic Crush, Wong played the medical intern "Hung Mei-suet", starring opposite Kenneth Ma and Tavia Yeung. She played the SDU member "So Man-keung" in the drama Tiger Cubs. In the comedy drama Divas in Distress, she collaborated with veterans Liza Wang and Gigi Wong. With her performance in 2012, Wong gained recognition by winning the Most Improved Female Artiste award at the 2012 TVB Anniversary Awards and has become one of the Next-Gen Fadans at TVB.

In 2013, Wong starred in the romance drama Always and Ever as the younger sister of Esther Kwan's character, which was her first villainous role and the producer had publicly praised her performance. Through the sequel The Hippocratic Crush II, Wong reprised her role as the neurosurgeon "Hung Mei-suet", for which she won one of the Top 15 Favourite TVB Drama Characters awards at the 2013 TVB Star Awards Malaysia.

In 2014, Wong reprised her role as "So Man-keung" in the sequel Flying Tiger II, for which she garnered her first nomination for Most Popular Female Character at the 2014 TVB Anniversary Awards.

In 2015, Wong played her first female leading role in the crime drama The Fixer, for which she gained her first Best Actress nomination at the 2015 TVB Anniversary Awards. She also won one of the Top 16 Favourite TVB Drama Characters awards at the 2015 TVB Star Awards Malaysia (which was her second win in this category). In the same year, she starred in her first ancient drama, Captain of Destiny.

=== 2016–present: established lead actress ===
In 2016, Wong starred in the family drama Daddy Dearest as the first female lead. In the legal drama Law dis-Order, Wong played "Martha Fong", an astute lawyer, starring opposite veteran actors Alex Fong and Liu Kai Chi. With this role, she won one of the Top 15 Favourite TVB Drama Characters award (which was her third win in this category) at the 2016 TVB Star Awards Malaysia, as well as earning her first nomination for the Favourite TVB Actress and was placed among top 5. She also won one of My Favourite TVB Female Character awards at the 2016 StarHub TVB Awards.

In 2017, Wong starred as the first female lead in two dramas. In the crime drama Nothing Special Force, she played a pregnant cause-of-death inspector, for which she won one of My Favourite TVB Female Character awards at the 2017 StarHub TVB Awards (which was her second win in this category). In the same year, Wong starred in the critically acclaimed supernatural drama The Exorcist's Meter, playing "Chong Tsz-yeuk", a kind-hearted A&E doctor, and a devil named "Salvia". With her role as "Dr. Chong", Wong was placed among top 5 for the Most Popular Female Character at the 2017 TVB Anniversary Awards. In addition, she was nominated for the Best Actress in the 2017 People's Choice TV Awards by audience and netizens, eventually ranking 2nd in the category.

In 2018, Wong starred as the first female lead in the legal comedy Threesome, She portrayed "Evie Fong", a competitive barrister with dissociative identity disorder, along with her two other personalities, the wild "Piña Colada" and the pessimistic "Sau Mak Mak". To prepare for her role, Wong had done research, watched numerous film and television work, and read books related to dissociative identity disorder. She earned critical acclaim from the public with her performance and netizens supported her to win the Best Actress award. Wong became the first TVB artiste featured on NASDAQ MarketSite at New York Times Square and was invited as a special guest at the 17th Miss Chinese Beauty Pageant 2018 Final, which was held in August. Wong's outstanding performance in Threesome earned her the Favourite TVB Actress awards in both Malaysia and Singapore at the 2018 TVB 51st Anniversary Gala. In her acceptance speech, Wong said, “I still firmly believe, that one’s effort may not necessarily be rewarded, but as long as we are willing to work hard, someone will see it.” She became a strong contender for the Best Actress award at the 2018 TVB Anniversary Awards, eventually placed among top 5 in both the Best Actress and Most Popular Female Character nominations. In addition, Wong won the 2018 People's Choice TV Awards for the Best Actress award and the 2018 Hong Kong Television Awards for the Best Leading Actress in Drama Series award, which served as a public recognition, as all awardees were 100% voted for by audience and netizens.

In 2019, Wong starred in the comedy drama My Life As Loan Shark as a passionate social worker, collaborating with veterans Kent Cheng, Kingdom Yuen, Maggie Shiu.

In 2020, Wong starred as the first female lead in three dramas. She first starred in the crime drama Brutally Young. Due to her character's tragic experience, Wong took half a year to emotionally withdraw from her character after filming the drama. In the sequel The Exorcist's 2nd Meter, she reprised her role as "Chong Tsz-yeuk", for which she won the Best Actress award in the hk01 Television Drama Awards with over 400 votes from netizens. In the same year, Wong starred in the crime drama Line Walker: Bull Fight, playing "Cheung Kei-gee (Madam G)", a chief inspector of police with savant syndrome and Asperger syndrome, for which she was praised for her profound portrayal of the character. Again, she became a strong contender for the Best Actress award at the 2020 TVB Anniversary Awards, eventually being placed among top 5 in the category.

In 2021, Wong starred in the crime thriller Murder Diary as "Yau Ngan-sing (Madam Sing)", the “Number One” Bomb Disposal Officer from the Explosive Ordnance Disposal Bureau. During filming, she was required to wear a bomb suit weighing 80 pounds and a 20-pound helmet. In the same year, Wong starred in the drama The Line Watchers as the first female lead. She played "Yan Kwan (Madam Kwan)", a Chief Trade Control Officer in the Hong Kong Customs and Excise Department, again pairing up with Benjamin Yuen. In this drama, her portrayal of a mother-to-be who underwent miscarriage was highly praised by netizens. With this role, Wong was once again placed among the top 5 nominees for the 2021 TVB Anniversary Awards for the Best Actress.

In 2023, Wong starred as the first female lead in the drama Secret Door. She played "Luna Cheung", which she claimed as the most depressed character she had ever played. Her performance was praised by the producer Amy Wong, veteran actor Hugo Ng as well as netizens.

On 1 December 2023, Wong announced her departure from TVB.

=== Variety shows ===
In 2017, along with Myolie Wu, Nancy Wu, Paisley Wu, Elaine Yiu and Selena Lee, Mandy Wong filmed a traveling show, The Sisterhood Traveling Gang, in Australia.

In 2019, Wong hosted her first reality TV show, Dancing For a Reason, which was filmed in Seoul, South Korea. In the show, she aspired to become a member of a K-pop girl group. Due to intensive training and the lack of rest, she fell ill and was briefly hospitalised. She was praised by viewers for her dedication and earnestness.

=== Stage plays ===
In January 2020, Mandy Wong made her stage debut in the stage play Let's Hunt for a "Tiger" Tonight, playing the witty and beautiful "Wong Sau-ying".

In May 2021, Wong starred in her second stage play, Larger Than Life, which is directed by the prominent stage director Tang Shu-wing. She played a charming robot named "Chloé". In the stage play, she had to dance Flamenco and perform fencing. Her performance was praised by the co-actors. The international theatre news website BroadwayWorld wrote a review on this stage play, which praised Wong for her convincing imitation of an android and her transition into the endearing Chloé with memories and emotions. Furthermore, she earned her first nomination for Best Actress in Comedy at the 30th Hong Kong Drama Awards.

== Filmography ==
=== Television dramas (TVB) ===
Year	Title	Role	Notes
2008	Best Selling Secrets 同事三分親	Neighbor 鄰居	Ep. 310
2008	Speech of Silence 甜言蜜語	Piano player 琴師	Supporting Role
2008	Moonlight Resonance 溏心風暴之家好月圓	Donna Chan Dou-dan 陳杜丹	Cameo Appearance
2008	When Easterly Showers Fall on the Sunny West 東山飄雨西關晴	Chong Shuk-woon 莊婌媛	Supporting Role
2008	Off Pedder 畢打自己人	Mandy Ma Wai-dan 馬慧丹	Ep. 30
2008	Pages of Treasures; Click入黃金屋	Bennie	Ep. 13
2009	E.U. 學警狙擊	Cheung Shu-shan 張樹珊	Supporting Role
2009	The King of Snooker 桌球天王	Amy	Supporting Role
2009	Just Love II 老婆大人II	Iris Ng Hoi-tung 伍凱彤	Supporting Role
2009	In the Chamber of Bliss 蔡鍔與小鳳仙	Ng Sheung-mui 吳賞梅	Supporting Role
2009	A Chip Off the Old Block 巴不得爸爸...	So Fung-lin 蘇鳳蓮	Major Supporting Role
2010	Suspects in Love 搜下留情	Cheng Siu-man 鄭笑雯 (鵪鶉妹)	Major Supporting Role
2010	Fly With Me 飛女正傳	Journalist 記者	Cameo Appearance
2010-2011	Home Troopers 居家兵團	Karen Chukot Yung 諸葛蓉	Major Supporting Role
2011	Ghetto Justice 怒火街頭	Silvia Cheung Tsz-sum 張芷芯	Supporting Role
2011	Lives of Omission 潛行狙擊	WPC Vicky Mung Sum-ling 蒙心凌 (阿檬)	Major Supporting Role
2011	Men with No Shadows 不速之約	Tai Yan 邰欣	Supporting Role
2012	L'Escargot 缺宅男女	Lau Siu-lan 婁笑蘭 (關二嫂)	Major Supporting Role TVB Anniversary Award for Most Improved Female Artiste; MY AOD Favourites Award for My Favourite Most Promising Female Artiste; Next TV Award for Best Scene-Stealing Supporting Actress
2012	The Hippocratic Crush; On Call 36小時	Dr. Hung Mei-suet 洪美雪	Major Supporting Role TVB Anniversary Award for Most Improved Female Artiste
2012	Tiger Cubs 飛虎	PIP So Man-keung 蘇文強	Major Supporting Role TVB Anniversary Award for Most Improved Female Artiste
2012	Divas in Distress 巴不得媽媽...	Kwai Yi-hei 夔懿曦	Major Supporting Role TVB Anniversary Award for Most Improved Female Artiste
2012-2013	Friendly Fire 法網狙擊	Wong Fei-fei 黃菲菲	Ep. 3-6
2013	Sergeant Tabloid 女警愛作戰	IP Szeto Kiu (Madam Kiu) 司徒驕	Major Supporting Role
2013	A Change of Heart 好心作怪	Ha Sze-ka 夏思嘉	Major Supporting Role
2013	Always and Ever 情逆三世緣	Tin Chau-ngan 田秋雁	Major Supporting Role
2013	The Hippocratic Crush II; On Call 36小時II	Dr. Hung Mei-suet 洪美雪	Major Supporting Role TVB Star Award Malaysia for Top 15 Favourite TVB Drama Characters
2014-2015	Tiger Cubs II 飛虎II	PIP So Man-keung 蘇文強	Major Supporting Role
2015	Madam Cutie On Duty 師奶Madam	Angel Hung Dan-dan 熊丹丹	Major Supporting Role
2015	The Fixer 拆局專家	Lui Lui 雷蕾	1st Female Lead TVB Star Award Malaysia for Top 16 Favourite TVB Drama Characters
2015	Captain of Destiny 張保仔	Chu Shuk-kwan 朱淑君	Major Supporting Role
2016	Daddy Dearest 超能老豆	Ophelia Chu Lai-fa 諸麗花	1st Female Lead
2016	Law dis-Order 律政強人	Martha Fong Ning 方寧	2nd Female Lead TVB Star Award Malaysia for Top 15 Favourite TVB Drama Characters; StarHub TVB Award for My Favourite TVB Female Characters
2016-2017	Rogue Emperor 流氓皇帝	Ng Dor-yu 吳多茹 / Shui Yik-shuen 水奕璇	Major Supporting Role
2017	Nothing Special Force 雜警奇兵	WPC Laser Lung Lai-sa 龍麗莎 (Laser姐)	1st Female Lead; StarHub TVB Award for My Favourite TVB Female Characters
2017	The Exorcist's Meter 降魔的	Dr. Felicity Chong Tsz-yeuk 莊芷若 / Salvia 魔	1st Female Lead
2018	Threesome 三個女人一個「因」	Evie Fong Yee-yan 方以因 / Piña Colada 菠蘿椰奶 / Sau Mak Mak 愁擘擘	1st Female Lead TVB Anniversary Award for Favourite TVB Actress in Malaysia; TVB Anniversary Award for Favourite TVB Actress in Singapore; People's Choice Television Award for Best Actress; Hong Kong Television Award for Best Leading Actress in Drama Series
2019	My Life as Loan Shark 街坊財爺	Mary Chu Ma-lei 朱瑪莉	2nd Female Lead
2020	Brutally Young 十八年後的終極告白	IP Yuen Lai-ken (Madam Yuen) 阮麗瑾	1st Female Lead
2020	The Exorcist's 2nd Meter 降魔的2.0	Dr. Chong Tsz-yeuk 莊芷若 / Salvia 魔	1st Female Lead hk01 Television Drama Award for Best Actress
2020	Line Walker: Bull Fight 使徒行者3	CIP Cheung Kei-gee (Madam G) 章紀孜	1st Female Lead
2021	Murder Diary 刑偵日記	SIP Yau Ngan-sing (Madam Sing) 游雁星	2nd Female Lead
2021	The Line Watchers 把關者們	"Yan" Kwan Pui-yan (Madam Kwan) 關佩欣	1st Female Lead
2023	Secret Door 隱門	Luna Cheung Sum-yuet 張心月 / Yip Man-man 葉敏敏	1st Female Lead
2024	In Bed With A Stranger	Koo Ching-tin 顧晴天	1st Female Lead

=== Television dramas (Shaw Brothers Pictures) ===
Year	Title	Role	Notes
2018	Flying Tiger 飛虎之潛行極戰	Dr. Cheung Wai-shan 張慧珊	Guest Appearance
2022	Mission Run 廉政狙擊·黑幕	Fong Ka-ching 方家晴	Main Role

=== Television drama (Mainland China) ===
Year	Title	Role	Notes
TBA	The Assassin 隱娘	Chi Ruoqing 遲若卿	Special Appearance

=== Films ===
Year	Title	Role	Notes
2012	I Love Hong Kong 2012; 2012我愛HK喜上加囍	TV director 節目編導	Cameo Appearance
2012	Natural Born Lovers 天生愛情狂	Second younger sister 二妹	
2013	Firestorm 風暴	Waitress 酒樓女侍應	Cameo Appearance

=== Television hosts ===
Year	Title	Notes
2007	Infolink 事必關己	
2009	Scoop 東張西望	
2017	The Sisterhood Traveling Gang 胡說八道真情假期	Episodes 1-6; Filmed in Australia; Co-host with Myolie Wu, Nancy Wu, Paisley Wu, Elaine Yiu and Selena Lee
2019	Dancing for a Reason 一個因去跳舞	5 episodes in total; Filmed in Seoul, South Korea

=== Stage plays ===
Year	Title	Role	Notes
2020	Let's Hunt for a "Tiger" Tonight 今晚打老虎	Wong Sau-ying 王秀英	1st Female Lead
2021	Larger Than Life' 超自然之戀	Chloé	1st Female Lead
2023	Bhagavad Gita 薄伽梵歌	Storyteller 說書人	1st Female Lead

== Awards and nominations ==
=== TVB Anniversary Awards ===
Year	Category	Drama / role	Result
2011	Most Improved Female Artiste	Scoop, Home Troopers, Ghetto Justice, Lives of Omission, Men with No Shadows	Nominated
2012	Most Improved Female Artiste	L'Escargot, The Hippocratic Crush, Tiger Cubs, Divas in Distress	Won
2012	Best Supporting Actress	L'Escargot — "Lau Siu-lan"	Top 2
2013	Best Supporting Actress	The Hippocratic Crush II — "Hung Mei-suet"	Nominated
2014	Best Supporting Actress	Tiger Cubs II — "So Man-keung"	Nominated
2014	Most Popular Female Character	Tiger Cubs II — "So Man-keung"	Nominated
2015	Best Actress	The Fixer — "Lui Lui"	Nominated
2015	Most Popular Female Character	Madam Cutie On Duty — "Hung Dan-dan (Angel)"	Nominated
2016	Best Actress	Law dis-Order — "Fong Ning (Martha)"	Nominated
2016	Most Popular Female Character	Law dis-Order — "Fong Ning (Martha)"	Nominated
2017	Best Actress	Nothing Special Force — "Lung Lai-sa (Laser)"	Nominated
2017	Most Popular Female Character	The Exorcist's Meter — "Chong Tsz-yeuk"	Top 5
2017	Most Popular Onscreen Partnership	The Sisterhood Traveling Gang (shared with Myolie Wu, Nancy Wu, Elaine Yiu, Selena Lee and Paisley Wu)	Nominated
2018	Favourite TVB Actress in Malaysia	Threesome — "Fong Yee-yan (Evie)"	Won
2018	Favourite TVB Actress in Singapore	Threesome — "Fong Yee-yan (Evie)"	Won
2018	Best Actress	Threesome — "Fong Yee-yan (Evie)"	Top 5
2018	Most Popular Female Character	Threesome — "Fong Yee-yan (Evie)"	Top 5
2019	Best Actress	My Life as Loan Shark — "Chu Ma-li (Mary)"	Nominated
2019	Most Popular Female Character	My Life as Loan Shark — "Chu Ma-li (Mary)"	Nominated
2020	Best Actress	Line Walker: Bull Fight — "Cheung Kei-gee"	Top 5
2020	Most Popular Female Character	Line Walker: Bull Fight — "Cheung Kei-gee"	Nominated
2020	Favourite TVB Actress in Malaysia	Line Walker: Bull Fight — "Cheung Kei-gee"	Top 5
2021	Best Actress	Murder Diary — "Yau Ngan-sing"	Nominated
2021	Best Actress	The Line Watchers — "Kwan Pui-yan"	Top 5
2021	Most Popular Female Character	Murder Diary — "Yau Ngan-sing"	Nominated
2021	Most Popular Female Character	The Line Watchers — "Kwan Pui-yan"	Nominated
2021	Favourite TVB Actress in Malaysia	Murder Diary — "Yau Ngan-sing"	Nominated
2021	Favourite TVB Actress in Malaysia	The Line Watchers — "Kwan Pui-yan"	Nominated
2021	Most Popular Onscreen Partnership	The Line Watchers (shared with Benjamin Yuen)	Nominated
2023	Best Actress	Secret Door — "Cheung Sun-yuet (Luna)"	Nominated
2023	Favourite TVB Actress in Malaysia	Secret Door — "Cheung Sun-yuet (Luna)"	Nominated

=== MY AOD Favourites Awards ===
Year	Category	Drama / role	Result
2011	My Favourite Most Promising Female Artiste	Lives of Omission — "Mung Sum-ling"	Nominated
2012	My Favourite Most Promising Female Artiste	L'Escargot — "Lau Siu-lan"	Won
2012	My Favourite TVB Supporting Actress	L'Escargot — "Lau Siu-lan"	Top 5

=== TVB Star Awards Malaysia ===
Year	Category	Drama / role	Result
2013	Top 15 Favourite TVB Drama Characters	The Hippocratic Crush II — "Hung Mei-suet"	Won
2013	Favourite TVB Supporting Actress	A Change of Heart — "Ha Sze-ka"	Top 5
2014	Favourite TVB Supporting Actress	Tiger Cubs II — "So Man-keung"	Nominated
2014	Top 15 Favourite TVB Drama Characters	Tiger Cubs II — "So Man-keung"	Nominated
2015	Top 16 Favourite TVB Drama Characters	The Fixer — "Lui Lui"	Won
2015	Favourite TVB Supporting Actress	Madam Cutie on Duty — "Hung Dan-dan (Angel)"	Nominated
2016	Top 15 Favourite TVB Drama Characters	Law dis-Order — "Fong Ning (Martha)"	Won
2016	Favourite TVB Actress	Law dis-Order — "Fong Ning (Martha)"	Top 5
2017	Top 17 Favourite TVB Drama Characters	Nothing Special Force — "Lung Lai-sa (Laser)"	Nominated
2017	Favourite TVB Actress	Nothing Special Force — "Lung Lai-sa (Laser)"	Nominated
2017	Favourite TVB Show Host	The Sisterhood Traveling Gang (shared with Myolie Wu, Nancy Wu, Elaine Yiu, Selena Lee and Paisley Wu)	Top 5

=== StarHub TVB Awards ===
Year	Category	Drama / role	Result
2013	Most Improved TVB Artiste	—N/a	Won
2014	My Favourite TVB Supporting Actress	The Hippocratic Crush II — "Hung Mei-suet"	Top 10
2015	My Favourite TVB Supporting Actress	Tiger Cubs II — "So Man-keung"	Top 10
2016	My Favourite TVB Female Characters	Law dis-Order — "Fong Ning (Martha)"	Won
2016	My Favourite TVB Actress	Law dis-Order — "Fong Ning (Martha)"	Nominated
2017	My Favourite TVB Female Characters	Nothing Special Force — " Lung Lai-sa (Laser)"	Won
2017	My Favourite TVB Actress	Nothing Special Force — " Lung Lai-sa (Laser)"	Nominated

=== Next TV Awards ===
Year	Category	Drama / role	Result
2013	Best Scene-Stealing Supporting Actress	L'Escargot — "Lau Siu-lan"	Won

=== People's Choice Television Awards ===
Year	Category	Drama / role	Result
2017	People's Choice Best Actress	The Exorcist's Meter — "Chong Tsz-yeuk"	Top 5 (Ranked 2nd)
2017	People's Choice Best Variety Show Host	The Sisterhood Traveling Gang (shared with Nancy Wu, Elaine Yiu, Selena Lee, Paisley Wu, Myolie Wu)	Top 6 (Ranked 2nd)
2018	People's Choice Best Actress	Threesome — "Fong Yee-yan (Evie)"	Won
2018	People's Choice Best TV Drama Partnership	Threesome (shared with Benjamin Yuen)	Top 6 (Ranked 3rd)
2020	People's Choice Best Actress	Brutally Young — "Yuen Lai-ken"	Nominated
2020	People's Choice Best Actress	The Exorcist's Meter — "Chong Tsz-yeuk"	Nominated
2020	People's Choice Best Actress	Line Walker: Bull Fight — "Cheung Kei-gee"	Nominated
2021	People's Choice Best Actress	Murder Diary — "Yau Ngan-sing"	Nominated
2021	People's Choice Best Actress	The Line Watchers — "Kwan Pui-yan"	Top 10 (Ranked 6th)
2021	People's Choice Best TV Drama Partnership	The Line Watchers (shared with Benjamin Yuen)	Nominated

=== Hong Kong Television Awards ===
Year	Category	Drama / role	Result
2018	Best Leading Actress in Drama Series	Threesome — "Fong Yee-yan (Evie)"	Won

=== hk01 Television Drama Awards ===
Year	Category	Drama / role	Result
2020	Best Actress	The Exorcist's 2nd Meter — "Chong Tsz-yeuk"	Won

=== 30th Hong Kong Drama Awards ===
Year	Category	Drama / role	Result
2022	Best Actress in Comedy	Larger Than Life — "Chloé"	Nominated
