= Threesome (Hong Kong TV series) =

Hong Kong TV series

- 三個女人一個「因」
- Genre: Modern; Legal; Comedy
- Written by: Steffie Lai Sin-yi
- Starring: Mandy Wong; Benjamin Yuen; Jason Chan; Arnold Kwok; Snow Suen; Joseph Lee; Gigi Wong; Lam King-ching; Kirby Lam
- Opening theme: "Uniquely Me" (無雙) by Miriam Yeung
- Country of origin: Hong Kong
- Original language: Cantonese
- No. of episodes: 18; 20 (Original Version)

Production
- Producer: Poon Ka-tak
- Production location: Hong Kong
- Production company: Television Broadcasts Limited

Original release
- Network: TVB Jade
- Release: 18 February – 15 April 2018

Threesome (Chinese: 三個女人一個「因」), is a 2018 legal comedy drama produced by TVB. It stars Mandy Wong, Benjamin Yuen and Jason Chan as the main cast, with Arnold Kwok, Snow Suen, Joseph Lee, Gigi Wong, Lam King-ching and Kirby Lam as the major supporting cast.

The drama earned critical acclaim and won My Favourite TV Drama in both Malaysia and Singapore in 2018 TVB 51st Anniversary Gala. Mandy Wong earned critical acclaim for her performance in the drama, playing Evie Fong Yee-yan, a barrister with dissociative identity disorder, along with Evie's two other personalities, Piña Colada and Sau Mak Mak, winning Favourite TVB Actress in a Leading Role in both Malaysia and Singapore in 2018 TVB 51st Anniversary Gala.

== Synopsis ==
Evie Fong Yee-yan (Mandy Wong) is a well-known barrister. In fact, she has Dissociative Identity Disorder. Although Evie keeps this secret from everyone, Lee Tong-kai (Benjamin Yuen), Evie's childhood friend, finds out she has DID by chance. In order to marry Theo Kei Hiu-yung (Jason Chan Chi-san), Evie accepts Kai as her apprentice and Kai must not reveal her secret to anyone.

== Cast ==
=== Main cast ===
Cast	Role	Description
Mandy Wong	Evie Fong Yee-yan (方以因)	A competitive barrister Suffered from Dissociative Identity Disorder and had lost her memory before the age of ten, but kept this as a secret from everyone Kai's childhood friend, becomes his pupil master after he found out that she has DID in order to prevent him from revealing her secret Theo's fiancée, broke up with him after knowing his biggest fear is DID patient
Mandy Wong	Piña Colada (菠蘿椰奶)	One of the split personalities of Evie; Wild, vigorous and likes to drink alcohol Did not get along with Evie; Befriended with Kai; Hated Wa Yee-sze; Got marry with Dominic after drunk, later divorces
Mandy Wong	Sau Mak Mak (愁擘擘)	Another split personality of Evie; Pessimistic and timid Had a crush on Kai
Benjamin Yuen	Lee Tung-kai (利東佳)	A law student, became Evie's apprentice after finding out she had DID; Cleared up the mess made by Evie's split personalities and prevented the others from knowing that she has DID, later befriended with Piña and Sau Mak Mak; Persuaded Evie to seek help from Dr. Bean
Jason Chan	Theo Kei Hiu-yung (紀驍勇)	A rich CEO; Suffered from Panic Disorder, feared of height, darkness, blood and ghost, biggest fear is DID sufferer, later sought help from Dr. Bean; Evie's fiancé, later broke up her without knowing that she suffered from DID

=== Major Supporting Cast ===
- Arnold Kwok as Dominic Tong Mai-ni (唐米尼), a model. He got marry with Piña after they were drunk in Las Vegas.
- Snow Suen as Dr. Bean Siu-dou (邊小豆), a psychotherapist who had a crush on Theo.
- Joseph Lee as Au-yeung Yat-bor (歐陽一波), a prosecutor from the Deputy of Justice and Evie's master.
- Gigi Wong as Easy Wah Yee-sze (華綺思), Evie's mother who treated her harshly.
- Lam King-ching as Bowin Bak Bo-wun (白保運), Evie's apprentice.
- Kirby Lam as Lee Tung-ling (利東伶), Kai's youngest sister.

== Awards and nominations ==
=== TVB Anniversary Awards 2018 ===
Category	Nominee	Result
Favourite TVB Drama in Malaysia	Threesome	Won
Favourite TVB Drama in Singapore	Threesome	Won
Favourite TVB Actress in Malaysia	Mandy Wong as "Fong Yee-yan (Evie)"	Won
Favourite TVB Actress in Singapore	Mandy Wong as "Fong Yee-yan (Evie)"	Won
Best Drama	Threesome	Nominated
Best Actress	Mandy Wong as "Fong Yee-yan (Evie)"	Nominated (Top 5)
Most Popular Female Character	Mandy Wong as "Fong Yee-yan (Evie)"	Nominated (Top 5)
Most Popular Drama Theme Song	Uniquely Me by Miriam Yeung	Nominated

=== People's Choice Television Awards 2018 ===
Category	Nominee	Result
People's Choice Best Drama	Threesome	Top 5 (Ranked 2nd)
People's Choice Best Script	Threesome	Won
People's Choice Best Actor	Benjamin Yuen as "Lee Tung-kai"	Top 5 (Ranked 3rd)
People's Choice Best Actress	Mandy Wong as "Fong Yee-yan (Evie)"	Won
People's Choice Most Improved Male Artiste	Arnold Kwok as "Tong Mai-ni (Dominic)"	Top 5 (Ranked 5th)
People's Choice Most Improved Female Artiste	Kirby Lam as "Lee Tung-ling"	Won
People's Choice Best TV Drama Partnership	Mandy Wong as "Fong Yee-yan (Evie)" and Benjamin Yuen as "Lee Tong-kai"	Top 6 (Ranked 3rd)
People's Choice Best TV Drama Theme Song	Uniquely Me by Miriam Yeung	Won

=== 2018 Hong Kong Television Awards ===
Category	Nominee	Result
Best Drama	Threesome	Won
Best Leading Actor in Drama Series	Benjamin Yuen as "Lee Tung-kai"	Top 5 (Ranked 2nd)
Best Leading Actress in Drama Series	Mandy Wong as "Fong Yee-yan (Evie)"	Won
Best Supporting Actress in Drama Series	Kirby Lam as "Lee Tung-ling"	Top 4 (Ranked 4th)
Best Drama Theme Song	Uniquely Me by Miriam Yeung	Top 5 (Ranked 4th)
