= Presumed Accidents =

Hong Kong television series

- Official poster
- Also known as: Skillful Accident; Purely An Accident
- 純熟意外
- Genre: Modern, Crime, Suspense
- Created by: Hong Kong Television Broadcasts Limited
- Written by: Lam Lai-mei (Head-writer), Chan Pui-wah, Ho Pui-chong, Tsang Shu-yan, Lau Tin-cheung, Tai Wai-man, Chu Tse, Yeung Suet-yi, Chan Wing-sun
- Starring: Lawrence Ng; Sisley Choi; Lai Lok-yi; Joyce Tang; Raymond Cho; Selena Lee
- Theme music composer: Chan Tze-man
- Opening theme: Unexpected Fate (命運的意外) by Hubert Wu
- Country of origin: Hong Kong
- Original language: Cantonese
- No. of episodes: 28

Production
- Executive producer: Catherine Tsang
- Producer: Andy Chan
- Production location: Hong Kong
- Editor: Lam Lai-mei
- Camera setup: Multi camera
- Running time: 45 minutes
- Production company: TVB

Original release
- Network: Jade
- Release: 30 May – 3 July 2016

Related
- My Dangerous Mafia Retirement Plan; Between Love & Desire

Presumed Accidents
- Traditional Chinese: 純熟意外
- Simplified Chinese: 纯熟意外
- Cantonese Yale: Sèunsuhk Yi'ngoih
- Literal meaning: "Skillful Accident"
Transcriptions
Standard Mandarin
- Hanyu Pinyin: Chúnshóu Yìwài
- Bopomofo: ㄔㄨㄣˊㄕㄡˊ ㄧˋㄨㄞˋ
Yue: Cantonese
- Yale Romanization: Sèunsuhk Yi'ngoih
- Jyutping: Seon4suk6 Ji3ngoi6

Presumed Accidents (Chinese: 纯熟意外; Cantonese Yale: Sèunsuhk Yi'ngoih; literally "Skillful Accident") is a 2016 Hong Kong modern suspense crime television drama produced by Andy Chan for TVB, starring Lawrence Ng and Sisley Choi as the main leads, with Lai Lok-yi, Joyce Tang, Raymond Cho and Selena Lee as the major supporting cast. Filming took place from June to October 2015 on location in Hong Kong. The series premiered May 30, 2016, airing every Monday to Friday on Hong Kong's TVB Jade, Malaysia's Astro On Demand and Australia's TVBJ channels during its 8:30-9:30 pm timeslot, concluding July 3, 2016 with a total of 28 episodes.

Presumed Accidents plot centers on insurance investigation and fraud with a side plot focusing on past life regression.

== Synopsis ==
Antique and Cafe shop owner George Kiu (Lawrence Ng) has a mysterious life. He is an immortal that has lived since ancient times. He was given a life elixir by Princess Yuet Ngai (Selena Li), a woman he loved when he was a high ranking general during the Yuan dynasty. A minor car accident connects him with Eunice Yan (Sisley Choi). Since Eunice resembles a loved one from his past, with the help of his personal butler the two begin a blossoming friendship which he hopes will bring them closer, but what seemed like romantic pursuing is actually something else as George has his reasons.

Insurance investigator Eunice Yan gives up her promising medical career when her parents are killed in a car accident on the day of her university graduation. When receiving her parents' life insurance payment she becomes curious of the process and decides on her future career path. After meeting George, each of her cases strangely somehow have a connection with him. Due to his connections with the people involved in the cases he becomes a huge help in helping her solve her cases. As the two become closer and closer their true relationship is later revealed and starts to understand why George wants to be part of her life. in order to mend the past he had wronged Eunice, George decides to work for the investigation firm she works for in order to fix their relationship and help her.

When Eunice learns of her complicated relationship with George she starts to pursue a relationship with her former university classmate Mantus Chuk (Lai Lok-yi), who is now an attorney for suspects of insurance fraud. George also meets Faye Lin Yeuk-fei (Selena Li) a woman that identically resembles his late wife Chong Wing-yee (Selena Li) who George loved very much. As Eunice and Mantus relationship progress and Faye and George become closer it is revealed that both Mantus and Faye are part of a sinister organisation and their main targets are George and Eunice. George and Eunice soon learns that all of the insurance cases they have investigated together are somehow connected and everything began the day of Eunice's parents death.

== Cast ==
=== Main cast ===
- Lawrence Ng as George Kiu Man-kit (喬文傑)

A mysterious man who has lived since ancient times. He meets Eunice when he accidentally scratches her car. Since Eunice resemblance someone in his life he starts to pursue her in order to form a relationship and also see if she really is who he thinks she is. He is somehow connected to all the cases that Eunice investigates. It is later revealed that his interest in Eunice is not romantic as he is Eunice's biological father. After the death of George's wife during child birth he could not accept reality and gave Eunice up to be raised by foster parents whom he hired. After an incident where he is almost accused of murder, he and Eunice starts to form a real father and daughter relationship.

- Sisley Choi as Eunice Yan Yin (殷然)

A former medical student whose parents died in a car accident on the day of her university graduation. While obtaining her parents death insurance payment she becomes curious and decides to become an insurance investigator. After worrying that she may have fallen-in-love with him, George finally reveals that she is his biological daughter and that the people she thought were her parents are actually people he hired to take care of her and give her a normal upbringing. Finding out George is her real father she starts to pursue a romantic relationship with her former university friend Mantus.

- Lai Lok-yi as Mantus Chuk Sing-yeung (卓聲揚)

A lawyer and Eunice's university friend. He and Eunice reconnect when he becomes the lawyer that represents suspects for the Insurance Fraud Organization. Eunice had a crush on him during their university years, after she finds out George is her father she decides to pursue a relationship with him. He pretends to get close to Eunice because he is the real head of the Insurance Fraud Organization. Faye and him grew up in the housing projects together and the two are in a secret relationship. George's staged accident on the death of Eunice's adopted parents caused him to lose a leg and the death of his father. Mad on revenge he kidnaps Eunice and Faye but this ultimately causes his own death.

- Joyce Tang as Jessie Hui Kit-ying (許潔瑩)

Head of True Detective (TD) Investigation Limited insurance department. She treats all of her employees like family and gives them all nicknames. She and her estranged husband Jason, have a young son together. After seeing her being bullied by her estranged husband's girlfriend, Lai Yat-ming pretends to be her new boyfriend which gives her the courage to finally divorce her husband. However, with Yat-ming pretending to be her boyfriend and dressing more formally she starts to develop a crush on him. With the help of her son, she and Yat-ming starts dating for real at the end.

- Raymond Cho as Richard Lai Yat-ming (黎一鳴)

A former CIB police investigator that currently works as an investigator at TD who is partnered with newbie investigator Smart Ho whom he can't seem to stand. He hates traffic speeding drivers because his police partner died in a car accident due to speeding traffic. Knowing he is a former police investigator, George ask him to help investigate Mantus and the Insurance Fraud Organization. He also helps Jessie by giving her the courage by pretending to be her new boyfriend, to divorce her estranged husband after seeing her being bullied by her husband's girlfriend.

- Selena Li as Faye Lin Yeuk-fei (凌若菲) / Chong Wing-yee (莊穎兒) / Princess Yuet Ngai (月牙公主)
  - Princess Yuet Ngai: A princess of the Yuan dynasty who was sent to Korea escorted by George at the time. When they fell in love, they were trying to escape from the imperial hunting. She fed George a Korean Immortal Pill which gave him the ability of self-healing and immortal life.
  - Chong Wing-yee: George's wife who he was madly in love with and Eunice's biological mother. She died in hospital while giving birth to Eunice. George first meets her while passing by and she was being a good samaritan saving an injured life on the street.
  - Faye Lin Yeuk-fei: An insurance sales agent that refers her clients to the Insurance Fraud Organization doctor. George meets her when she claims to be the owner of the antique porcelain cup George highly seeks after. She is also in a secret relationship with Mantus who is the real head of the Insurance Fraud Organization. Due to her similar facial appearance to Chong Wing-yee she agrees to have plastic surgery to look identical to Wing-yee in order to help Mantus and get close to George. With the help of George to help her face her fears she starts to see the evil side of Mantus.

=== B Cup Cafe staff ===
- Chow Chung as Brian Cheung Hak-loi (張克萊; nicknamed B Kid (B仔))
  - Bob Cheung as Young Brian Cheung Hak-loi (張彥博青年)

George Kiu's personal butler who knows his secret. He helps George get close to Eunice by setting up circumstances where she has to relay on George for help. He also helps George manage his cafe and online antique dealing. The other secret is he is also George's adopted son whom George found abandon as a baby during World War II.

- Snow Suen as Yeung Yin-ngoi (楊言愛; nicknamed I.I)

Eunice's feisty friend and roommate. She is model but is often unemployed and later gets a job as a waitress at George's cafe. She gets killed when she finds out about Insurance Fraud organization, which her boyfriend Tang Chuk-qiu is part of.

=== True Detective (TD) Investigation Limited staff ===
- Henry Lo as Mak Wing-cheung (麥永祥)

A middle-aged man and former investigator who does administrative work at TD.

- Calvin Chan as Smart Ho Tse-chung (何智聰)

A new investigator at TD who is partnered with Lai Yat-ming. He is eager and optimistic on every case he takes on, however, Yat-ming can't stand him and decides to take Tse-fung as his new partner.

- Milkson Fong as Yeung Tse-fung (楊梓楓; nicknamed Ah Mook (阿木))

A new investigator at TD who is partnered with Eunice. He is nicknamed Ah mook (meaning wood in Chinese) because he is slow and stiffed, however he is more intelligent than everyone thinks. He later resigns from TD because he found a better job.

- Brian Chu as Sherlock Hung Siu-hon (洪兆恆)

The secretary at TD. He is in charge of filing and submitting case files to the insurance companies once a case has been completed.

=== Insurance Fraud organization ===
*A secret organization that stages accidents or murder victims in order to collect insurance payments. They are also assassins for hire that will solicit their clients with a purpose to kill someone.

- Max Cheung as Blue Yau Tin-nam (游天藍)

Leader of an insurance fraud organization that stages accidents or murder victims with no known relatives in order to collect insurance. He fronts as a home furnishing shop owner. George's staged accident of Eunice's adopted parents caused him and wife to lose their unborn child and later his wife's suicide. Tang Chuk-qiu later kills him in order to avenge for his girlfriend Yeung Yin-ngoi, death.

- Rachel Kan as Chan Ka-kei (陳家琪)

She poses as a social worker helping the homeless in order to find new victims for the organization. She is actually the cause of May Kwan's death. She was forced into the fraud organization when they blackmailed her after obtaining evidence that she murdered a man who was sexually abusing a retarded girl she was a case worker of. Due to her conscience she later betrays the organization.

- Hoi Yeung as Tang Chuk-qiu (鄧卓翹)

Yeung Yin-ngoi boyfriend who she meets when she forces him to take her to see her sick grandmother in the hospital. He fronts as an entertainment reporter but is really the photographer in charge of photographing the organizations target. He kills Blue Yau in order to avenge for Yeung Yin-ngoi, whom he really did love, death. In the process of killing Blue he ends up killing himself.

- Man Yeung as Lee King-chiu (李勁超)

A mechanic garage owner whose car repair shop is involved in shady business in order to scam insurance companies. He was a teenage juvenile delinquent who tried to steal from Mantus. After Mantus finds out he under the control of an abusive triad boss, Mantus becomes his friend. The two reconnect as adults when Mantus is his lawyer for a hit and run case that he is a suspect of. After proving his innocence Mantas buys him a mechanic garage in order to commit insurance fraud. He is later killed by the organization by raging his car brakes.

- Kedar Wong as To Kam (杜金)

A mechanic at Lee King-chiu's garage. For a cut of the money he writes up fake invoices or pretend extra work has been done to a vehicle in order to scam insurance money. He was made a sacrifice of the organization when the police started learning more about their organization.

- Geoffrey Wong as Ko Tak-shing (顧德成)

A doctor that Faye Lin refers her insurance clients too. He misdiagnose his patients as having cancer and purposely makes them sick so the organization can collect their life insurance. He was Blue Yau's died wife doctor. After being blamed for patient neglect due to Blue's wife suicide he gets fired from his hospital job. He decides to open his own practice but since his name as a doctor has been tainted, his business struggling, and also his wife who suffers from liver disease medical expenses building up, Blue recruits him into the organization.

=== Extended cast ===
- Winki Lai as Mok Hei-tung (莫曦彤)

A plain clothes CIB police officer who works with the TD investor team. She is also Eunice's friend.

- Glen Lee as Jason

Jessie Hui's estranged husband. He is a lawyer that works in the same law firm as Mantus. Jessie persistently wants to reconcile with him but he is not interested because he has already moved on with a new girlfriend name Judy. He treats Jessie extremely poorly but later regrets it when she finally divorces him.

- Hugo Chan as Jimmy

Jessie and Jason's young son. He is aware of his parents marriage trouble.

- Eric Chung as Yan Kai-kwong (殷啟光)

Eunice's supposed father but really her adopted father hired by George to raise Eunice. He and his pretend wife fake their death in order to retire as Eunice's parents. He later becomes a drummer for a Japanese rock band.

- Samantha Chuk as Tong Suk-han (唐淑嫻)

Eunice's supposed mother but really her adopted mother hired by George to raise Eunice. After marrying her real husband and becoming pregnant she ask to retire by faking her death to Eunice.

== Cases & Case cast ==
*Cases plotted by the Insurance Fraud Organization

Jealous Mad Exploding Pot Ep. 1-2 *

An overheated cooking pot explodes killing the apartment units resident Ida Tang and her across the hall neighbor Ted Ching. TD investigators are tasked by the victims insurance company to investigate, Ida's much younger husband seems suspicious after his wife's death since he is more celebratory then grieving. While Ted Ching's death may have been a drug overdose since he was snorting cocaine moments before he died. However, when the TD team starts uncovering Ted's complicated love life with his longtime girlfriend May Kwan and a younger mainland fiancée he was hiding, they suspect foul play involved.

- Lee Yee-man as May Kwan Wai-mei (關慧美)

Ted Ching's girlfriend. Injured during the explosion when a window fell on her head she loses her memory.

- Eileen Yeow as Ida Tang Oi-gwan (鄧愛君)

A wine wholesaler killed when a pot on the stove exploded. She and her much younger husband Simon Yung, seemed like a blissful couple from the pictures they display on their social media accounts, but her maid Hai tells the TD investigators a different story.

- Stanley Cheung as Simon Yung Sei-man (翁世文)

Ida Tang's much younger husband. Their maid Hai, describes him as a playboy

- Au Hin-Wai as Ted Ching Wai (程懷)

May Kwan's long-time boyfriend who was engaged to a much younger mainland girl. Also Ida Tang's across the hall neighbor.

- Virginia Lau as Wong Yuen-yuen (王媛媛)

Ted Ching's much younger mainland fiancée.

- Liu Si-lok as Sister Hai (霞姐)

A maid that works part-time for both May Kwan and Ida Tang.

No Pain Waist Injury Ep. 2-3

When office worker Ho Ka-wai constantly applies for worker compensation on a waist injury he sustained at work the TD team are called to investigate if his injury is real or fake. On the first day of trailing Ka-wai, Eunice and Yeung Tse-fung uncovers that his waist injury is indeed fake but they think there is more to this case since the chiropractor Alex Cheung, treating Ka-wai is also the one filling out the worker compensation forms. Eunice also suspects that Alex Cheung's receptionist Michelle Lam, is in on the deception since Ka-wai constantly gift her with expensive gifts. Soon Eunice finds out that there is a love triangle between Ho Chun-hin, Alex Cheung and Michelle Lam and also who is the real brains behind this con.

- Ronald Law as Ho Ka-wai (何家偉)

An office worker who injured his waist two years ago when a co-worker shoved him to the floor. He has been living on worker compensation since he says his waist is too injured for him to work.

- Devily Leung as Michelle Lam Ho-man (林可敏)

Alex Chung's medical clinic receptionist. Ho Ka-wai likes her and gives her expensive gifts to pursue her. She is also in a romantic relationship with her boss Alex Cheung.

- Ho Chun-hin as Alex Cheung Ching-hong (張正康)

The Chiropractor that has been treating Ho Ka-wai and writes up the medical reports requesting to extend his worker compensation.

Fainting Construction Building Site Injury Ep. 2-3

Yat-ming and Smart are assigned to a case where a building construction worker was found unconscious at the construction site and later died from brain injuries. They must find out the truth on what happened in order for his family to collect on his worker compensation insurance. Yat-ming and Smart can't determine if the construction worker died from work related injuries but seeing how the construction worker's widow now has to raise two small children on her own, Yat-ming writes a report that is in the constructions worker's widow favor.

- Mandy Lam as Mrs. Keung (強嫂)

Widow of the construction worker who died at the worker site. She is left to raise her 7 year old and 6 month old sons alone.

- Ivan Chan as Little boy Ming (明仔)

Mrs. Keung's 7-year-old son.

Fake Priceless Jade Ep. 3-5

Eunice and Yat-ming partner up to investigate an armored car jewel heist. They must determine if the heist was an inside job before the insurance paid to the jewelry company. The case reconnects her with former university classmate Ben Suen, who is now a police investigator. Ben seems to be pursuing Eunice but George who is helping Eunice investigate the case uncovers Ben's gambling debt and suspects Ben and the jewelry store owner Chin Hoi-fung who also has a gambling debt, might be working together to con the insurance company.

- Mark Ma as Ben Suen Man-bun (孫文彬)

A police detective who is also Eunice's university classmate. Due to a gambling debt he works together with Chin Hoi-fung on a jewelry heist to con insurance money.

- Ricky Wong as Chin Hoi-fung (錢凱豐)

A jewelry store owner who befriended Ben Suen and racked up a gambling debt on a casino outing with Ben. To pay off his debt he and Ben devise a plan to rob an armor car carrying his jewels.

- Chiu Lok-yin as Ng Yiu-tat (吳耀達)

A robbery suspect who went insane and committed suicide because of the distrust treatment he receives from society and his family due to his criminal past.

- Vincent Cheung as Ho Wah (何華)

An armor car employee who was part of the jewelry heist plan but was double crossed when the robbers killed him.

- Kelvin Chan as Kwok Tse-hin (郭子軒)

Former jewelry shop employee who is a suspect in the robbery case.

- Shally Tsang as Yue (茹)

Ng Yiu-tat's older sister who does not trust her brother's innocence.

Gorgeous Legs, Sexy Lips Ep. 5–7

Famous model Angelina, who has her legs and face insured, is attacked by a crazed fan and is injured. Angelina is multi insured with her mother Helen as the recipient of one plan and her manager John the other. Eunice with the help of George, has to investigate if there is insurance fraud involved. Further into her investigation Eunice starts to uncover the complicated life and marriage of Angelina. As Angelina is recovering in the hospital, her secret of plastic surgery, heritage and husband's infidelity becomes tabloid news. Her husband Hong Kiu, a popular radio DJ proclaims his innocence and tells the press that he is true to his wife. Angelina's rival Chloe is unhappy with Hong Kiu's proclamation of love for his wife and tries to kill Angelina.

- Joel Chan as Hong Kiu (康喬)

Angelina's husband. He works as a popular radio DJ. He has known Angelina since university and knows of her true physical appearance.

- Yoyo Chen as Angelina Choi Si-ying (蔡詩英)

A famous celebrity model who is known for her looks, figure and mix Chinese-Korean heritage. Yeung Yin-ngoi is a huge fan of her.

- Celine Ma as Helen

Angelina's mother. She cares more about money then her daughters well-being. for money she sells her daughters secrets to tabloids.

- Derek Wong as John

Owner of the modeling agency that Angelina and Chloe are signed to. He is in a secret affair with Helen.

- Kathy Fung as Chloe

A new rising model who is also Angelina's biggest rival. She is ill-tempered and obsessively in-love with Hong Kiu.

- Louis Szeto as Ho Sau-yiu (何守耀)

Angelina's crazy obsessed fan who tried to poison Hong Kiu.

Give Me A Home Ep. 8-10 *

Warehouse worker Chiu Wing-hon dies accidentally when he falls off a cliff during a work outing. The more Eunice and Tse-fung investigate into Wing-hon's life the more suspicious his case becomes. The deceased had a lot of debt, the recipient of Wing-hon's insurance coverage is his wife of one month Lau Yuk-hing, who only met and married her husband on a whim and doesn't seem to know anything about her husband. His estranged mother says her son was a disobedient unruly child who has been detained in his youth and was once homeless. The most suspicious is Wing-hon's boss Lai Gwok-nin, who decided to provide an all-expense-paid outing for all his employees when his business is a new start up that hasn't been profitable.

- Leslie Ka as Chiu Wing-hon (趙永漢)

A warehouse stock person with a criminal past. He died falling off a cliff during a work outing.

- Jess Sum as Lau Yuk-hing (劉玉馨)

Chiu Wing-hon's wife of one month. She doesn't know anything about her husband's past. Lai Gwok-nin is her lover. Part of the Insurance fraud organization and was murder by Lee King-chiu who made it look like a suicide.

- Stephen Ho as Lai Gwok-nin (黎國年)

Chiu Wing-hon's boss who took all his employees on an all expense paid trip even though his business is not profitable. Part of the Insurance fraud organization. Afraid he will be killed like his lover Yuk-hing, he admits to killing Chiu Wing-ho.

- Chan Wing-chun as Si Bing-kuen (施秉權)

A homeless man who was acquainted with Chiu Wing-hon and know of his true struggles.

- Ceci So as Chiu Wing-hon's mother (趙永漢之母)

Chiu Wing-hon's mother who was a prostitute in her youth and had her son out of wedlock. She suspect foul play in her son's death.

Sister's Double Ep. 8-10

Orphaned identical twin sisters Tsui Man-ting and Yu Bik-yiu are reunited as adults after being separated as children being adopted by different families, but the two are separated again when Man-ting dies in a car explosion. In their short time reunited Man-ting brought an insurance policy with Bik-yiu as the recipient. Yat-ming and Smart are assigned to this case, while Smart finds nothing wrong, Yat-ming recognizes Man-ting as a prostitute who had tried to solicit him earlier. Yat-ming soon suspects that Bik-yiu might actually have been the one killed with the real Man-ting taking over her life.

- Joey Mak as Tsui Man-ting (徐敏婷) / Yu Bik-yiu (余碧瑤)

Orphaned identical twin sisters separated by adoption. Tsui Man-ting was swindled by a pimp who forces her into prostitution, while Yu Bik-yiu is a university student with loving parents.

- Au Hoi-ling as Director Lee (李主任)

She is aware of the twins switching identities.

- Leo Tsang as Yu Bik-yiu's father (余碧瑤之養父)

Yu Bik-yiu's adopted father.

- Helen Ng as Yu Bik-yiu's mother (余碧瑤之養母)

Yu Bik-yiu's adopted mother.

- Kimmi Tsui as Tse Tin-Chiu (指天椒)

A prostitute that was under the same pimp as Tsui Man-ting.

Medical Doctor Can't Self-heal Ep. 10-13

After disappearing for many years Kong Ka-kei has finally been declared died. Since he has an insurance coverage for both his mother and wife, Eunice and Yat-ming are sent to investigate them. Yat-ming uncovers Ka-kei's mother Cheng Ho-choi is always in need of money yet she and her youngest son Ka-lun are looking to purchase a bigger home and new car. While Eunice uncovers his wife Yue Wing was a mainland girl who married a much older Ka-kei, she also finds out that Wing has been in a relationship with her widowed brother-in-law Man Wing-to. However George being close acquaintances with Ka-kei knows what really happened to him.

- Pat Poon as Kong Ka-kei (江家麒)

Yue Wing's husband. A Chinese medical doctor who disappeared to the mountains to learn to heal himself form an immortal sage.

- Akina Hong as Yue Wing (姚泳)

Kong Ka-kei's much younger wife. After her husband's disappearance she becomes a sought after Chinese medical doctor when she heals a tycoon. Since her husband's disappearance she had started a relationship with her brother-in-law Man Wing-to.

- KK Cheung as Man Wing-to (萬永圖)

Cheng Ho-choi's widowed son-in-law. He started a relationship with Yue Wing while she was searching for Ka-kei. To start afresh he and Wing later immigrated to Canada.

- Lily Leung as Cheng Ho-choi (鄭好彩)

Kong Ka-kei and Ka-lun's mother. Yue Wing and Man Wing-to's mother-in-law. She knows her son Ka-lun is a big spender but she lets him indulge and is always asking her former son and daughter in-law for mother money.

- Akai Lee as Kong Ka-lun (江家麟)

Cheng Ho-choi's youngest son who is a spoiled spender. He tries to blackmail Man Wing-to with his relationship with Yue Wing to get more money from him.

Only Have Eyes For You Ep. 13-15 *

Elaine Tin Ling, a blind art sculptor dies when a store sign falls on her. Two years ago she and her than boyfriend Mark Mak Ho-yin had brought life insurance with each other as the recipient under the status of fiancée. TD's investigation finds Mark's background very suspicious since he broke up with Elaine and soon had a rich fiancée name Erica whose father had paid off Mark's debts and brought the two a luxury home. Also Mark works as a masseuse that caters only to females. However all of Mark's alibi checks out and soon TD finds that Elaine might have had an unrequited admire in Mark's classmate Ken.

- Gloria Chan as Elaine Tin Ling (田靈)

A blind art sculptor who died accidentally when a store sign fell on her. She and Mark was in a loving relationship but he dumped her because he was made fun of by his classmates.

- Kimmy Kwan as Poon Mei-nga (潘美亞)

Elaine's roommate who taught Elaine to sculpt. An alcoholic jealous that Elaine's sculptures were better than hers. She lure Elaine under the sign in order to kill her and sell Elaine's sculptures as her own. She was contacted by the Insurance Fraud Organization to kill Elaine.

- Hero Yuen as Mark Mak Ho-yin (麥浩賢)

A university student that was also on the tennis team. Elaine's former boyfriend and Erica's fiancée. He loved Elaine but dumped her because he felt ashamed of her and needed money to pay off his debt.

- Kelvin Leung as Ken Luk Chin-kan (陸展勤)

Mark's university classmate and tennis team member. He fell in love with Elaine at first sight and often made Mark feel ashamed for having a blind girlfriend. He thought he and Elaine could become a couple when she and Mark broke up.

- Hebe Chan as Erica

Mark's fiancée. She is a rich girl who had her father pay off Mark's debt and brought her and Mark a luxury home.

Flooded Wood Ep. 17-18

A wood art antique dealer claims his warehouse sprinkler system went off damaging an expensive wooden art. While investigating the warehouse Yat-ming finds a tube of lipstick on the floor and something other than water in the cracks of the wood art. After testing what was found in the wood, plus the lip stick Yat-ming concludes that the art antique dealer was really having an affair with his mistress at the warehouse.

- Gregory Lee as Wu Yue-jo (胡耀祖)

Bad Family Companion, Mistaken! Ep. 17-19 *

While on a date with Mantus, Eunice witness Francis Tse Dong-lam falling out a window and dead. Francis death is suspected as a suicide but Eunice slightly remembers seeing a shadow behind the curtains of the window. Since Eunice was at the scene she takes over the case. With Tse-fung resigning TD hires George, but she refuses to work with him since she is still made at him. However George is a huge help since he is acquainted to Francis and his wife Tong Tse-wan. Francis, who is a known philander was having an affair with his employee Whitney Ding Siu-wai. As Eunice investigate Whitney she finds out that Whitney's personality at day and night is the complete opposite. Whitney seems to have a liking for middle aged man, but George finds out that a young man named Lee Lap-chau is madly in love with Whitney and is willing to do anything or spend any amount of cash to get her.

- Zoie Tam as Whitney Ding Siu-wai (丁小惠)

Francis Tse's employee who he was also having an affair with. Due to her being raised in a strict home she does anything possible to rebel against her father Ding Yat-kwan.

- Tung King-man as Lee Lap-chau (李立秋)

A son of a taxi driver who liked Whitney but got mad when she rejected him. He hires the Insurance Fraud Organization to kill Whitney when he feels his ego hurt due to her rejecting him.

- Parkman Wong as Francis Tse Dong-lam (謝冬臨)

Tong Tse-wan husband whom she was in the process of divorcing. He was having an affair with his employee Whitney. He fell out the window and killed himself after getting high on Whitney's drugs.

- Fanny Ip as Tong Tse-wan (唐芷芸)

Francis Tse's soon to be ex-wife. She is also squinted with George since both are antique collectors.

- Lau Kong as Ding Yat-kwan (丁日坤)

Whitney's father. He is extremely strict with his daughter because he is a high court judge and afraid she will become like the criminals he sentences.

Love You, Love To Kill You Ep. 20-21 *

George becomes a murder suspect when he is at the wrong place at the wrong time. TD's head of the accounting department Jeff Ho receives an award at the annual employee dinner party. He over praises his wife Maggie Chan Ga-nei for being a great support in his life due to his handicap. In reality he is very much bitter about the state he is in and hates it when people offer to help him because he is wheel car bound. Thinking his wife is having an affair with her former med school classmate Chung King-to because he is handicapped he has his work secretary Alice, help him trail his wife and later agrees to the Insurance Fraud Organization's proposition. George is clear on all charges when cat burglar Ma Tse-kin provides the evidence with the real murder's blood. However, before Tse-kin got killed he had sold an object George desired to black market antique dealer Chun with connections to the Insurance Fraud Organization.

- Jack Wu as Jeff Ho Ken-lap (賀建業)

Head of TD's accounting department. Maggie Chan Ga-nei husband. A car accident a few years ago left him paralyzed waist down and wheel car bounded. He is extremely bitter about his handicap and becomes paranoid that his wife is having an affair behind his back. He later regrets what he has done when he finds his wife's journal.

- Chelffy Yau as Maggie Chan Ga-nei (陳佳妮)

Jeff Ho Ken-lap wife. She gave up her medical career in order to take care of her handicapped husband. When she has dinner with her old med school classmate Chung King-to, her husband thinks she is having an affair.

- Ocean Wong as Ma Tse-kin (馬志堅)

A cat burglar who was burglarizing Jeff Ho's home when Maggie Chan was being killed. He proceeds to rob the home of its priceless antiques but hides an object with the real killers blood.

- Sunny Tai as Chung King-to (鍾競濤)

A doctor who is Maggie Chan's former med school classmate. Jeff thinks he is having an affair with his wife.

- Aurora Li as Alice

Jeff Ho's dutiful secretary at TD. She strikes up a friendship with Yat-ming and tells him the extra work her bitter boss forces her to do such as driving a car to trail his wife.

- Cheng Shu-fung as Chun (泉)

A black market antique dealer that buys stolen goods from Ma Tse-kin.

Real Cancer Ep. 22-24 *

The insurance company is suspicious of fraud being conducted when healthy clients who have brought a policy less than a year are then stricken with cancer. The TD team is sent to investigate the matter. Eunice and George finds something in common with all the insurance clients, they all share the same doctor, Ko Tak-shing. In order to commit fraud, the Insurance Fraud Organization finds possible victims, buys an insurance policy under the victims name and then sends them to the shady Dr. Ko for a medical report. The shady doctor then switches medical reports with actual cancer patients or sometimes more sinister by killing their victims, in order to scam the insurance companies.

- Chan Wing-chun as Si Bing-kuen (施秉權)

A former homeless man that was connected to a previous case. Chan Ka-kei helps him find government housing and brings him to see doctor Ko Tak-shing for a checkup in order to purchase life insurance.

- Kevin Yau as Wang (宏)

Si Bing-kuen's grown. He is stricken with cancer.

Price Of Love Ep. 24-26 *

Madam Mok Hei-tung's older sister Mok Hei-yue becomes the Insurance Fraud Organization's latest target when her longtime boyfriend Eric Chow is blackmailed into killing her since Hei-yue has a life insurance policy with Eric as the recipient. Eric Chow who had a business deal gone bad falsify his accounting books in order to hide his bad business deals. The Insurance Fraud Organization learns of this and tells him he must pay them to kill his girlfriend Hei-yue or else they will report his business dealings to authorities.

- Claire Yiu as Mok Hei-yue (莫曦瑜)

Mok Hei-tung's older sister. She knows of her longtime boyfriend Eric Chow Bak-him's bad business dealings and was willing to help him through it but had no idea that he was willing to kill her to protect himself.

- Jimmy Au as Eric Chow Bak-him (周柏謙)

Mok Hei-yue's longtime boyfriend. He receives a phone call for the Insurance Fraud Organization blackmailing him. He chooses to protect himself and have Hei-yue killed.

== Development and production ==
- The costume fitting ceremony was held on June 24, 2015 12:30 pm at Tseung Kwan O TVB City Studio One.
- The blessing ceremony was held on July 20, 2015 2:30 pm at Tseung Kwan O TVB City Studio Thirteen.
- Filming took place from June until October 2015, entirely on location in Hong Kong. The exterior of "Fooody (伙食工業)" restaurant, located at 57 Au Pui Wan St, Hong Kong served as the exterior of B Cup Cafe.
- A promo image of Presumed Accidents was featured in TVB's 2016 calendar for the month of May.
- Presumed Accidents was originally slated to air after the broadcast of Nirvana in Fire on TVB's 9:30 pm timeslot. Due to concerns of low ratings Daddy Dearest was removed from the schedule line up once again with Presumed Accidents being pushed to broadcast first.

=== Critical reception ===
Presumed Accidents received mixed to positive responses. On Douban, a Chinese media database, the drama received a rating of 6.5 out of 10 based on 1000+ votes. Most of the criticism was directed at female lead Sisley Choi, who was criticised for her annoying acting in the first few episodes. Selena Li's performance, however, received critical acclaim, with viewers citing Li as their reason for tuning into the series.

== Viewership ratings ==
Timeslot (HKT)	#	Week	Episode(s)	Average points	Peaking points
Mon – Fri (8:30-9:30 pm); 20:30–21:30	1	30 May – 3 June 2016	1 – 5	23	26
Mon – Fri (8:30-9:30 pm); 20:30–21:30	2	06 – 10 June 2016	6 – 10	22	25
Mon – Fri (8:30-9:30 pm); 20:30–21:30	3	13 – 17 June 2016	11 – 15	23	--
Mon – Fri (8:30-9:30 pm); 20:30–21:30	4	20 – 24 June 2016	16 – 20	23	29
Mon – Fri (8:30-9:30 pm); 20:30–21:30	5	27 June – 1 July 2016	21 – 25	24	--
Mon – Fri (8:30-9:30 pm); 20:30–21:30	5	Sat 2 July 2016	26	25	--
Mon – Fri (8:30-9:30 pm); 20:30–21:30	5	Sun 3 July 2016	27 – 28	26	31
Total average				23.2	31

== Awards and nominations ==
Year	Ceremony	Category	Nominee	Result
2016	StarHub TVB Awards	My Favourite TVB Actor	Lawrence Ng	Nominated
2016	StarHub TVB Awards	My Favourite TVB Supporting Actor	Lai Lok-yi	Nominated
2016	StarHub TVB Awards	My Favourite TVB Supporting Actress	Selena Li	Nominated
2016	StarHub TVB Awards	My Favourite TVB Female TV Character	Selena Li	Nominated
2016	StarHub TVB Awards	My Favourite TVB Theme Song	"Unexpected Fate" (命運的意外) by Hubert Wu	Nominated
2016	TVB Star Awards Malaysia	My Favourite TVB Drama Series	Presumed Accidents	Nominated
2016	TVB Star Awards Malaysia	My Favourite TVB Actor in a Leading Role	Lawrence Ng	Nominated
2016	TVB Star Awards Malaysia	My Favourite TVB Actor in a Supporting Role	Lai Lok-yi	Nominated
2016	TVB Star Awards Malaysia	My Favourite Top 15 TVB Drama Characters	Lawrence Ng	Nominated
2016	TVB Star Awards Malaysia	My Favourite Top 15 TVB Drama Characters	Lai Lok-yi	Nominated
2016	TVB Star Awards Malaysia	My Favourite Top 15 TVB Drama Characters	Sisley Choi	Won
2016	TVB Anniversary Awards	Best Series	Presumed Accidents	Nominated
2016	TVB Anniversary Awards	Best Actor	Lawrence Ng	Nominated
2016	TVB Anniversary Awards	Best Actress	Sisley Choi	Nominated
2016	TVB Anniversary Awards	Best Supporting Actor	Lai Lok-yi	Nominated
2016	TVB Anniversary Awards	Best Supporting Actress	Selena Li	Nominated
2016	TVB Anniversary Awards	Most Popular Series Song	Unexpected Fate (命運的意外) by Hubert Wu	Nominated
