= The Hippocratic Crush II =

- Promo poster
- Also known as: On Call 36 Hours II
- On Call 36小時II
- Genre: Medical drama
- Created by: Hong Kong Television Broadcasts Limited
- Written by: Shin Shu Mui 冼淑梅; Lee Hui Yee 李慧儀; Wong Siu Ching 黃秀清; Lau Chee Heng 劉芷恒; Leong Kin Bong 梁建邦; Wong Bin Yee 黃秉怡; Chum Kin Wai 譚劍偉; Yu Kar Kun 余家冠
- Starring: Lawrence Ng; Kenneth Ma; Tavia Yeung; Mandy Wong; Him Law; Tracy Chu; Eliza Sam; Louisa So; Benjamin Yuen; Jerry Ku; Crystal Li; Derek Kok; Paisley Wu
- Theme music composer: Tang Chi-wai
- Opening theme: 續集 by Joey Yung (Sequel)
- Ending theme: 連續劇 by Joey Yung (Serial Drama)
- Country of origin: Hong Kong
- Original languages: Cantonese some Mandarin and English
- No. of episodes: 30

Production
- Executive producer: Tommy Leung
- Producer: Poon Ka tak 潘嘉德
- Production location: Hong Kong
- Editors: Lam Choong Bong 林忠邦; Tong Kin Ping 湯健萍
- Camera setup: Multi camera
- Running time: 45 minutes (each)
- Production company: TVB

Original release
- Network: Jade; HD Jade
- Release: 4 November – 15 December 2013

Related
- Brother's Keeper; Return of the Silver Tongue; The Hippocratic Crush

The Hippocratic Crush II, also known by its Chinese title On Call 36 Hours II (Chinese: On Call 36小時 II) is a 2013 Hong Kong television medical drama series produced by Poon Ka-tak and TVB. The drama follows the lives of young housemen, residents, and their mentors working in Mercy Hospital (慈愛醫院), a fictional hospital set in Hong Kong.

== Synopsis ==
The Hippocratic Crush II (a.k.a. On Call 36 Hours II) immediately follows off from The Hippocratic Crush (a.k.a. On Call 36 Hours), following the lives of doctors, new and old, facing the patients and challenges that unfold before them.

Cheung Yat Kin (Kenneth Ma) and Fan Chi Yu (Tavia Yeung) are now happily married to each other but life ahead is not easy for them. They have to face new obstacles together if they are to keep their relationship growing strong. Chi Yu finds herself pregnant but her intramedullary spinal cord tumour relapsed to which makes her unfit to continue with the pregnancy. However, she insists on carrying on with the pregnancy and this causes certain disputes between the couple. Though this does not mean that Yat Kin loves Chi Yu any less; he just can’t bear watching her suffer so he offers to carry some of her burdens.

Chi Yu’s illness causes her to eventually relent to getting an abortion, as well as making her incompetent to perform surgery on patients. This is a huge blow to her as well as Yat Kin. His mother also falls sick which added pressure on him, causing him to develop an anxiety disorder and stomach ulcer from chronic indomethacin (Motrin) use. However, with Yat Kin by her side, Chi Yu isn’t ready to give up yet; she wants to help Yat Kin to stand strong again. So she decides to switch afresh, switching from cardiology to pathology, learning under the disciplinary of Man Sang who helps her to regain her strength. In addition, Chi Yu (Yu Jai) believes that she could remain a pathologist if she were later required to use a wheelchair.

Yat Kin finds it difficult to accept the new challenges in his life, however, as he watches his friends and fellow subordinates, Mei Suet and Pui Chung grow to become independent, capable and experienced doctors, he learns that he must first protect himself before he can protect others. Will he be able to do this and protect those whom he loves and cares about? What is the true meaning behind being a doctor? It is merely about saving about patients? What about the doctors themselves?

The challenges that he has to face with Chi Yu on top of his stubborn personality takes a toll on his relationship with newly transferred pathology specialist, Lok Man Sang (Lawrence Ng). The two are constantly at each other’s throat with differing opinions and their approach with medicine which creates further tension between the two doctors. Lokman gets involved with fellow internal medicine doctor, Heung Chin Yi (Tracy Chu), who happens to be twenty years younger than him.

Man Sang and Chin Yi have a very different view of love. Lokman is a widowed man with a young daughter Yannis (Elkie Chong) while Chin Yi is left having to take care of her runaway (later revealed as deceased) boyfriend's son. Through mutual understanding and hardships, the two grow to love each other despite their age difference. Chin Yi was looking for her boyfriend, who was hired by Monica to do renovation work on Lokman's cafe and was with Monica when he died in a traffic accident in mainland China. Chin Yi was also the school classmate of the daughter of Neurosurgery Chief Dr. Lam, Che Che (played by Eliza Sam).

Lokman and David grew up together and with Monica (never shown) run a cafe. Lokman has CML leukemia. David suddenly needs brain surgery. David enters in a relationship with Yannis' aunt/de facto step-mother.

Meanwhile, Chi Yu’s sister, neurosurgeon Hong Mei Suet (Mandy Wong) also has her own challenges to face as she finally becomes a doctor in her own right. However, that is not the only challenge in her life. Her relationship with her orthopaedic surgeon boyfriend Lau Ping Chan (Benjamin Yuen) heads on the rocks as their relationship turns into a love triangle.

Fresh Cardiosurgeon, Yeung Pui Chung (Him Law) undergoes his own journey to become a better doctor. As his career picks up, he finds himself in a love triangle with his crush in Australia Ching Ching (Candy Chang, who appears in cameo), training doctor Chung Tsz Ting (Crystal Li) and Che Hiu Tung (Eliza Sam), 26 year old a social worker volunteer, who suffers from a chronic illness, brainstem glioma, partially resected at age 16 with a life expectancy of 3 to 10 years. Che Che (Che Hiu Tung) was a school classmate of Heung Chin Yi (played by Tracy Chu) and daughter of Dr. Lam, the chief of Neurosurgery and Dr. Cheung Yat Kin's boss. Che Che eventually develops symptoms of brainstem glioma growth, including double vision and facial paralysis.

== Cast ==
- Lawrence Ng as Dr. Lokman Lok Man Sang (洛文笙), new head of pathology, co-owner of Another House Cafe, has leukemia (episode 2)
- Kenneth Ma as Dr. Cheung Yat Kin (張一健), neurosurgery consultant, husband of Fan Chi Yu
- Tavia Yeung as Dr. Fan Chi Yu (范子妤), pathology, formerly cardiothoracic surgery consultant, wife of Cheung Yak Kin
- Mandy Wong as Dr. Hung Mei Suet (洪美雪), neurosurgery associate consultant, younger sister of Fan Chi Yu, girlfriend of Benjamin
- Him Law as Dr. Yeung Pui Chung (楊沛聰), cardiothoracic surgery associate consultant
- Tracy Chu as Dr. Heung Chin Yi (向芊兒), internal medicine associate consultant, took care of ex-boyfriend's son, knew Monica (absent co-owner of Another House Cafe, who knew Dr. Heung's ex-boyfriend), her parents were editors for Moon Suen Man Yuet (episode 9)
- Eliza Sam as Che Hiu Tung (車曉彤), hospital volunteer (episode 2), daughter of Dr. Lam (head of neurosurgery, episode 25), grew up as schoolmates and friends with Dr. Heung Chin Yee (episode 26), brain stem glioma (tumour) since age 16
- Louisa So as Moon Suen Man Yuet (孫曼月), author, sister-in-law of Lokman, cared for Yannis
- Benjamin Yuen as Dr. Benjamin Lau Ping Chan (劉炳燦), orthopaedics consultant, boyfriend of Hung Mei Suet
- Jerry Ku as David Mo Yong Wai (慕容衛), co-owner of Another House Cafe, one of few surviving rich heirs of a family
- Crystal Li as Dr. Chung Tsz-ting (鍾紫婷), houseman
- Derek Kok as Lui Siu Yik (吕小益), nurse, husband of To Ka Man
- Paisley Wu as To Ka Man (屠家敏), chief nurse, wife of Lui Siu Yik
- Elkie Chong as Yannis Suen Hei Yan (孫希欣), estranged young daughter of Lokman
- Ben Wong as Dr. John Chong Pok Man (莊博文), Chief of Service & neurosurgery consultant
- Marcus Kwok as Dr. Tong Hon Pong (湯漢邦), neurosurgery consultant
- Tse Cheuk Yin as Dr. Andy Law On Dik (羅安迪)
- Gigi Wong as Wong Siu Un (黃笑鶯), mother of Cheung Yat Kin
- Grace Wong as Amber Ling Kwan (凌筠), former medical school, now street dancer
- 唐子輝 (surname Tang) as Kok Fan Sing (葛凡星), small boy and son of Fai, Heung Chin Yi's boyfriend

== Ratings ==
Week	Episode	Date	Average Ratings	Highest Ratings
1	01－05	November 4, 2013 - November 8	26 Points	31 Points
2	06－10	November 11, 2013 - November 15	26 Points	27 Points
3	11－13	November 18, 2013, 20, 21	26 Points	27 Points
4	14－18	November 25, 2013 - November 29	25 Points	28 Points
5	19－23	December 2, 2013 - December 6	26 Points	28 Points
6	24－28	December 9, 2013 - December 13	26 Points	28 Points
6	29－30	December 15, 2013	30 Points	31 Points
