= Divas in Distress =

Hong Kong television drama series

- Promotional poster
- Also known as: A Chip Off the Old Block II
- Genre: Comedy
- Created by: Poon Ka-tak
- Written by: Chan Kam-ling
- Starring: Liza Wang; Gigi Wong; Chin Kar-lok; Chung King-fai; Mandy Wong; Him Law; Koo Ming-wah; Mimi Chu; Eliza Sam; Henry Lee
- Theme music composer: Tang Chi-wai
- Opening theme: Nang Fau Oi Yu Seung (能否愛遇上) by Edmond Leung
- Country of origin: Hong Kong
- Original language: Cantonese
- No. of episodes: 22

Production
- Executive producer: Poon Ka-tak
- Production location: Hong Kong
- Camera setup: Multi camera
- Running time: 45 mins.
- Production company: TVB

Original release
- Network: TVB Jade
- Release: 27 August – 23 September 2012

Related
- A Chip Off the Old Block (2009)

Divas in Distress
- Chinese: 巴不得媽媽...
- Literal meaning: "anxious mother"
Transcriptions
Standard Mandarin
- Hanyu Pinyin: Bā Bù Dé Mā Mā
Yue: Cantonese
- Jyutping: Ba1 Bat1 Dak1 Ma1 Ma1

Divas in Distress is a 2012 Hong Kong television drama produced by TVB. Written by Chan Kam-ling and produced by Poon Ka-tak, Divas in Distress is a sister production of the time traveling comedy, A Chip Off the Old Block.

== Plot ==
Shang Yinghong and Miao Xinghe, former stars, were once huge stars in the television industry. But they disagreed with each other and had constant disputes, and eventually retired from the entertainment industry due to a car accident. Yinghong married a wealthy businessman and her wealth soared, while Xinghe married a decorator and lived an ordinary life.

Their grievances and hatreds continued to the next generation. The eldest daughter Zhai Dingyin fell in love with Xinghe's only son Zhuang Jialang, but their families opposed it. In order to fulfill the wishes of the two families, the two became in-laws. However, Dingyin concealed her illness and took the risk of giving birth to a child, but unfortunately died. Yinghong believed that Xinghe and Jialang were the culprits and forced her grandson to stay with her. Xinghe tolerated it, but he was still unwilling in his heart. Jialang felt guilty about Yinghong and gave up his custody.

In life, Jialang still missed his deceased wife, and Xiang Naixin fell in love with him, but Jialang kept his distance from her. Yinghong put all her efforts into her son Zhai Yousheng, making him a successful designer. Kui Yixi, adopted by her uncle, works hard, has a frank and kind personality, and develops a subtle relationship with Yousheng.

The entanglements of these people's lives and the intertwined emotions constitute a complex story of family, love, and career.

== Cast and characters ==
=== Hung's Household ===
Name	Actor/actress	Background
Sheung Ying Hung (商映紅)	Liza Wang	Retired television actress Sing Ho's rival Ka Long's mother in law Ding Yam and Vincent's mother So Kei's godmother Michel's maternal grandmother Han Man's apprentice
Vincent Chak Yau Sing (翟有聲)	Him Law	Creative director of Pei Gik; Loves Yi Hei, later boyfriend then fiancé Ying Hung's son Ding Yam's younger brother So Kei's godbrother Michel's uncle
Deneuve So Lo Wah (蘇露華)	So Yan Chi	Ying Hung's helper So Kei's adopted mother
So Kei (蘇基)	Koo Ming Wah	Creative director Lo Lo's boyfriend Han Man and Yuek Chan's biological son Deneuve's adopted son Ying Hung's godson Hannah's brother Ding Yam and Vincent's godbrother
Michel Chong Man Sai (莊問璽)	Tong Chi Fai	Ka Long and Ding Yam's son Kan Sau and Sing Ho's grandson Hung's grandson Vincent's nephew Yi Hei's second cousin

=== Ho's Household ===
Name	Actor/actress	Background
Chong Kan Sau (莊謹修)	Henry Lee	Renovator; Sing Ho's husband Ka Long's father Yi Hei's uncle Michel's paternal grandfather F4's master
Miu Sing Ho (繆星河)	Gigi Wong	Retired television actress Ying Hung's rival Kan Sau's wife Ka Long's mother Yi Hei's aunt Michel's paternal grandmother Han Man's apprentice
Chong Ka Long (莊家朗); Yi Long San (二朗神)	Chin Kar-lok	LCD News news photographer Loves Hannah, later boyfriend Kan Sau and Sing Ho's son Ying Hung's son in law Michel's father Yi Hei's Cousin
Kwai Yi Hei (夔懿曦)	Mandy Wong	Renovator; Loves Vincent, later girlfriend then fiancé Kan Sau and Sing Ho's niece Ka Long's cousin Michel's second cousin

=== F4 Brothers ===
Name	Actor/actress	Background
Fan Chau Shui (范秋水)	Russel Cheung	Renovator; Kan Sau's apprentice
Fan Chun Nei (范春泥)	Jason Lam	Renovator; Kan Sau's apprentice
Fan Lai Kam (范禮金)	Simon Lo	Renovator; Kan Sau's apprentice
Fan Kiu Muk (范喬木)	Eddie Law	Renovator; Kan Sau's apprentice

=== LCD News Department ===
Name	Actor/actress	Background
Lo Yuk Fan (魯玉芬); Lo Lo (姥姥)	Wan Yu Hung	General director of LCD News department So Kei's girlfriend
Mo Tak Ting (武德鼎)	Eric Chung	LCD cameraman
Poon Koo Chor (盤鼓初)	Mark Mah	LCD cameraman
Ching Sam (程琛)	Marcus Tin	LCD News news reporter

=== Other ===
Name	Actor/actress	Background
Fung Han Man (馮恨晚)	Chung King-fai	Ying Hung and Sing Ho's master So Kei's father Yeuk Chan's ex-lover, later lover
Ching Yeuk Chan (程若真)	Mimi Chu	Entrepreneur; So Kei and Hannah's mother Han Man's ex-lover, later lover
Hannah Heung Nai Hing (香乃馨)	Eliza Sam	LCD News news reporter Loves Ka Long, later girlfriend Yuek Chan's daughter So Kei's sister
Apple Lam Sau Ping (林秀萍)	Kirby Lam	Vincent's secretary

== Production ==
Development for Divas in Distress began in January 2010. Intentionally planned to be a sequel of TVB's popular time traveling comedy, A Chip Off the Old Block, Poon Ka-tak decided to reboot the entire series after scheduling conflicts did not work out with the original cast. After casting Liza Wang in January 2012, Gigi Wong, Chin Kar-lok, Chung King-fai, Mandy Wong and Him Law followed in February 2012. Liza Wang and Gigi Wong's last collaboration was in 1976's The Legend of the Book and the Sword.

Principal photography began in late March. On 23 March 2012, the cast attended a costume fitting press conference. A blessing ceremony was held on 8 May. Filming completely in mid-June 2012.

== Viewership ratings ==
The following is a table that includes a list of the total ratings points based on television viewership.

Week	Originally Aired	Episodes	Average Points	Peaking Points	References
1	27–31 August 2012	1 — 5	30	—	
2	3–7 September 2012	6 — 10	30	—	
3	10–13 September 2012	11 — 14	31	35	
4	17–21 September 2012	15 — 19	31	—	
4	22–23 September 2012	20 — 22	33	36	

== International Broadcast ==
- Malaysia - 8TV (Malaysia)
