= L'Escargot (TV series) =

2012 Hong Kong television drama

- Promotional poster
- 缺宅男女
- Genre: Modern drama
- Written by: Lau Choi Wan; Suen Ho Ho
- Directed by: Kwok Wai Sing
- Starring: Michael Miu; Michael Tse; Sonija Kwok; Linda Chung; Ron Ng; Joyce Tang; Mandy Wong; Him Law; Oscar Leung; Angelina Lo; JJ Jia; Yoyo Chen
- Theme music composer: Tang Chi Wai
- Opening theme: A Tale of a Wounded City (傷城記) by Linda Chung and Ron Ng
- Country of origin: Hong Kong
- Original language: Cantonese
- No. of episodes: 30

Production
- Producer: Nelson Cheung
- Cinematography: Hong Kong
- Camera setup: Single camera
- Production company: Television Broadcasts Limited

Original release
- Network: TVB Jade
- Release: 3 January – 12 February 2012

L'Escargot
- Traditional Chinese: 缺宅男女
- Simplified Chinese: 缺宅男女
- Literal meaning: "Dwellings of Men and Women"
Transcriptions
Standard Mandarin
- Hanyu Pinyin: Quē Zhái Nán Nǚ
Yue: Cantonese
- Jyutping: Kyut3 Zaak6 Naam4 Neoi2

L'Escargot is a 2012 Hong Kong television drama inspired by the 2009 Chinese television drama Dwelling Narrowness, starring Michael Miu, Michael Tse, Sonija Kwok, Linda Chung and Ron Ng as the main leads. It is produced by Television Broadcasts Limited (TVB) under executive producer Nelson Cheung, and was filmed with a single-camera setup. A costume fitting was held on 20 September 2010. A blessing ceremony was held on 14 October 2010 where production started and ended in January 2011.

== Overview ==
In Hong Kong, many people work their entire lives to achieve their dream of owning their own house. Handyman Kwan Ka-On (Michael Miu) and his family have struggled for years living in a cramped apartment and it seems they have almost reached their goal. However, Ka-On's dream is threatened by a number of troubling circumstances relating to his family. Because Ka-On is the eldest son of his family, he has an overdeveloped sense of responsibility towards others, which hurts his wife Long-Kiu (Sonija Kwok), especially when they are forced to live apart from their daughter.

Meanwhile, Ka-On's selfish and greedy sister-in-law, Lau Siu-Lan (Mandy Wong) encourages her husband Ka-Hong (Oscar Leung) to take advantage of his older brother to obtain a house without spending any money of their own, especially after Ka-Hong injures his leg. Ka-On's sister Ka-Lok (Linda Chung), a public relations agent, finds herself entangled in affairs of property developer and real estate agent Ko Wang-Chim (Michael Tse). Her budding relationship drives a wedge between Ka-Lok and her long-time boyfriend, Ting Koon Fung (Ron Ng), who turns to Ko Wang-Chim's shy and sheltered younger sister, Joyce (JJ Jia), and earns the ire of Ko Wang-Chim's wife, Lee Man Wah (Joyce Tang). Finally, Ka-On's youngest brother, Ka-Wing (Him Law) manages to find a stable job, but is frustrated by his independent and overbearing girlfriend Buk-King (Yoyo Chen)'s attempts to ensure that they have a stable and comfortable future together.

Despite everyone's problems, the family is held together by Ka-On's tireless mother (Angelina Lo). However, when something unimaginable happens to her, it threatens to turn everyone against one another.

== Cast ==
=== The Kwan family ===
Cast	Role	Description
Angelina Lo	Cheung Mei Ling 張美玲	Kwan Ka On, Kwan Ka Hong, Kwan Ka Lok and Kwan Ka Wing's mother Sze Long Kiu, Lau Siu Lan and Buk King's mother in-law Kwan Hau Lam, Kwan Cho Kwai, and Kwan Cho Fu's grandmother Lives in Chun Moon House, Ko Chun Court, Yau Tong with the whole family
Michael Miu	Kwan Ka On 關嘉安	Handyman and decorator Sze Long Kiu's husband Cheung Mei Ling's eldest son Sze Yat Man and Chung Pui Yiu's son in-law Kwan Ka Hong, Kwan Ka lok and Kwan Ka Wing's eldest brother Kwan Hau Lam's father
Sonija Kwok	Sze Long Kiu 施朗翹	Housewife, later bank staff Kwan Ka On's wife Sze Yat Man and Chung Pui Yiu's daughter Cheung Mei Ling's daughter in-law Kwan Hau Lam's mother
Oscar Leung	Kwan Ka Hong 關嘉康	Van driver Lau Siu Lan's husband Cheung Mei Ling's second son Kwan Ka On's younger brother Kwan Ka Lok and Kwan Ka Wing's second brother Kwan Cho Kwai's father
Mandy Wong	Lau Siu Lan 婁笑蘭	Housewife; Kwan Ka Hong's wife Cheung Mei Ling's daughter in-law Kwan Ka On, Kwan Ka Lok and Kwan Ka Wing's sister in-law Kwan Hau Lam's aunt Kwan Cho Kwai's mother Has many siblings, lived in Tong Street; Selfish and a scold
Linda Chung	Kwan Ka Lok 關嘉樂	Cheung Mei Ling's daughter Kwan Ka On, Kwan Ka Hong and Kwan Ka Wing's sister Kwan Hau Lam, Kwan Cho Kwai, and Kwan Cho Fu's aunt Ting Koon Fung's girlfriend, later broke up in episode 18; Lee Man Wah's love rival
Him Law	Kwan Ka Wing 關嘉榮	Cheung Mei Ling's youngest son Kwan Ka On, Kwan Ka Hong and Kwan Ka Lok's youngest brother Kwan Hau Lam, Kwan Cho Kwai, and Kwan Cho Fu's uncle A pizzeria worker, later fired. Hired as Country Club staff after Buk King advised him to go work there. Buk King's boyfriend later husband.
Yoyo Chen	Buk King 卜瓊	Country club staff Kwan Ka Wing's girlfriend later wife Cheung Mei Ling's daughter in-law Kwan Ka On, Kwan Ka Hong, Kwan Ka Lok's sister-in-law
Leung Hoi Ching	Kwan Cho Kwai 關祖貴	Cheung Mei Ling's granddaughter Kwan Ka Hong and Lau Siu Lan's daughter Kwan Ka On, Sze Long Kiu, Kwan Ka Lok, Kwan Ka Wing, Buk King's niece Kwan Hau Lam's cousin Kwan Cho Fu's sister
Lam Chi Nok	Kwan Hau Lam 關巧琳	Kwan Ka On and Sze Long Kiu's daughter Cheung Mei Ling's granddaughter Kwan Ka Hong, Lau Siu Lan, Kwan Ka Lok, Kwan Ka Wing, Buk King's niece Kwan Cho Kwai and Kwan Cho Fu's cousin
	Kwan Cho Fu 關祖富	Cheung Mei Ling's grandson Kwan Ka Hong and Lau Siu Lan's son Kwan Ka On, Sze Long Kiu, Kwan Ka Lok, Kwan Ka Wing, Buk King's nephew Kwan Cho Kwai's brother Kwan Hau Lam's cousin

=== The Ko family ===
Cast	Role	Description
Michael Tse	Ko Wang Chim (Jim) 高宏瞻	Main Villain Estate agent and Property developer Lee Man Wah's husband Ko Choi Yiu's older brother Ting Koon Fung's love rival Has relation line with Kwan Ka Lok; Kwan Ka Lok's superior Graduated from Middle School, was a Real Estate Salesman; Loves Kwan Ka Lok and pursues her Kwan Ka Lok's boss, later lover, finally broke up. Almost boarded the plane that crashed in Episode 15.
Joyce Tang	Lee Man Wah (Mandy) 李蔓華	Former Celebrity; Ko Wang Chim's wife Kwan Ka Lok's love rival Ko Choi Yiu's sister in-law Has a mutual benefit marriage with Ko Wang Chim
JJ Jia	Ko Chi Yiu (Joyce) 高采貽	An artist Suffers from shyness Ko Wang Chim's younger sister Ting Koon Fung's girlfriend later wife

=== The Ting family ===
Cast	Role	Description
Jason Pai	Ting Hoi 丁海	Handyman and decorator Wong Lai Sim's husband Ting Koon Fung, Ting Koon Kwan and Ting Koon Fong's father Has a second family in Mainland China and an illegitimate child
Manna Chan	Wong Lai Sim 王麗嬋	Ting Hoi's wife Ting Koon Fung, Ting Koon Kwan and Ting Koon Fong's mother
Ron Ng	Ting Koon Fung 丁冠鋒	Financial broker/Real Estate Salesman; Ting Hoi and Wong Lai Sim's eldest son Kwan Ka Lok's boyfriend, later broke up in episode 18; Ko Wang Chim's love rival Ko Chi Yiu's boyfriend later husband
James Wong	Ting Koon Kwan 丁冠軍	Ting Hoi and Wong Lai Sim's youngest son Ting Koon Fung's younger brother Ting Koon Fong's older brother
Tina Shek	Ting Koon Fong 丁冠芳	Ting Hoi and Wong Lai Sim's daughter Ting Koon Fung and Ting Koon Kwan's younger sister

=== The Sze Family ===
Cast	Role	Description
Joe Junior	Sze Yat Man 施逸文	Ex newspaper editor Chung Pui Yiu's husband Sze Long Kiu's father Kwan Ka On's father-in-law
Pat Yan	Chung Pui Yiu 鍾佩瑤	Sze Yat Man's wife Sze Long Kiu's mother Kwan Ka On's mother-in-law
Sonija Kwok	Sze Long Kiu 施朗翹	Sze Yat Man and Chung Pui Yiu's daughter

=== Ting Chim Real Estate Agent Company ===
Cast	Role	Description
Michael Tse	Ko Wang Chim 高宏瞻	Main Villain Chairman
Ron Ng	Ting Koon Fung 丁冠峰	Property manager
Linda Chung	Kwan Ka Lok 關嘉樂	Public relations senior
Vin Choi	Kenny Ma	Ko Wang Chim's assistant
Leung Kin Ping	Leung Pak Ho 梁柏豪	Staff
Kong Wing Fai	Peter	Staff
Lee Kai Kit	Dai Hon 大漢	Staff

== Other cast ==
Cast	Role	Description
Geoffrey Wong	Yeung Chung Wai (Paul) 楊忠偉	Banker; Sze Long Kiu's superior and ex-boyfriend Loves Sze Long Kiu
Lo Mang	Yu Ying Chun 余英俊	Handyman and decorator Kwan Ka On's colleague
Hoffman Cheng	Pao For Sun 鮑火燊	Handyman and decorator Kwan Ka On's colleague
Felix Lok	Mr. Cheuk 卓生	A billionaire Lee Man Wah's friend and confidant
Summer Joe Ha (夏竹欣)		
Leung Kin Ping (梁健平)		
Irene Wong (汪琳)		
Teresa Ha (夏萍)		
Kong Wing Fai (江榮暉)		
Mak Ka Lun (麥嘉倫)		
Eric Chung (鍾志光)		
Chow Po Lam (周寶霖)		
Ho Man Kit (賀文傑)		
Brian Wong (黃澤鋒)		
Poon Koon Lam (潘冠霖)		
Jim Tang		
Chan Wing Chun (陳榮峻)		
Law Wing Han (羅泳嫻)		
Joe Junior		
Kelvin Lee (李興華)		
Calvin Chan	Joe	Therapist

== Story ==
The story is primarily about the inter-connected trials of the Kwan, Ting, and Ko family in life, money, and romance. Kwan Ka-On (Michael Miu) is the eldest brother of the Kwan family. He's husband to Sze Long-Kiu (Sonija Kwok) and father to Kwan Hau-Lam (Lam Chi Nok). Living as a construction worker, he lives job-to-job based on the contracts he gets from clients. He and his family would develop an unusual tie with Ko family after working with them and getting intertwined in their affairs.

Ko Wang-Chim (Michael Tse) is CEO of his own company, Ting Chim Real Estates. He's interested in seizing depreciated estates and gaining big returns through major building renovations and selling them off to upper-class buyers. In between, his wife, Lee Man-Wah (Joyce Tang) had hired Ka-On and his crew for a major renovation project upon their new mansion. Things become complicated when Ka-On's second brother, Kwan Ka-Hong (Oscar Leung), got injured due to Wang-Chim.

Ka-Hong and his pregnant wife (first grandson to the Kwan family), Lau Siu-Lan (Mandy Wong), lived in one of the very estates that Wang-Chim wanted to buy, rebuild, and re-sell. Originally, Wang-Chim dispatched his personal assistant to help finalize the contracts and would pay Ka-Hong a large favorable sum of money. Unfortunately, Siu-Lan's shrewd and greedy nature wasn't satisfied with the amount. She felt that Ka-Hong should've haggled more as she knows Wang-Chim wants the building badly. To that end, Ka-Hong relented to his wife and he canceled the contract signing.

Ka-Hong then started public protests to incite unfairness and claimed Wang-Chim was a cheater. Both husband and wife tried to pressure Wang-Chim by attempting to humiliate and pressure him to reimbursed them with more money. Unfortunately, Wang-Chim wasn't pleased with the results and asked his assistant to help him take care of the problem. The assistant dispatched low-level thugs to threaten and scare the couple, but things turned awry when Ka-Hong foolishly attempted to chase down the thugs and accidentally got run over by their getaway car. He was left with a severely damaged leg and required surgery. Unfortunately, Ka-Hong has strong fears against surgery and refuses surgery while crying to have his leg fixed.

When Ka-On learned of his brother's injuries, he confronted Wang-Chim over the matter; Wang-Chim denied personal involvement in his brother's injuries, but offered a large check as a gesture of goodwill to Ka-On. Being a man of old fashioned principles, Ka-On refused the check as he felt this was "hush money" and an insult to him and stormed off. Although the meeting was very tense, Wang-Chim was impressed by Ka-On's sense of nobility in the matter.

In between this time, Ka-On's little sister, Kwan Ka-Lok (Linda Chung), also met Wang-Chim through a near car collision. Ka-Lok was spending time with her boyfriend, Ting Koon-Fung (aka Big Ding, Ron Ng). They just finished their night together and bought a new pair of shoes. Wang-Chim nearly hit her while on the road, but was fine; her shoes on the other hand was badly damaged. Feeling bad over the matter, Wang-Chim wrote a very large check over such low-grade shoes and she never cashed the check. Upon seeing him again, she returned his check and Wang-Chim was impressed by her honesty and unselfish nature and began keeping in contact with her through her PR company, Only You (a company he later buys to keep ties with Ka-Lok), collaborated with him for a series of real estate PR projects.

Because of Ka-Hong's incident, relations between the Kwans and Wang-Chim became tense. To save his brother's right leg without surgery, Ka-On ventured to inner-China in attempt to find a famous Chinese healer that applied non-evasive methods of healing his injuries. When Wang-Chim also heard about Ka-On's mission, he decided to quietly intervene by pressuring the doctor to help heal Ka-Hong. However, Siu-Lan wasn't satisfied over the situation as she blamed Ka-On for their misfortunes (even though it was her fault) and guilt-tripped Ka-On into covering all their medical bills, including letting them move back into the clan's cramped apartment. With Ka-Hong on the road to recovery, things between Wang-Chim were repaired after Ka-On learned he helped convince the doctor to save his brother's leg.

Life at the cramped up apartment wasn't great. With so many bills to cover, including his brother's, Ka-On worked very hard on multiple projects for extended periods of time with little food. In between this time, life at the house became more and more challenging as Siu-Lan's laziness, selfishness, and narcissism affected the peace. Whenever other family members fight with her over her misdeeds, she would always fake pregnancy pains to avert any punishment. Ka-Hong himself became somewhat emotionally unstable and depressed due to the fact they had no income and no resources to escape their current situation. When the family learned of his situation, the youngest brother, Kwan Ka-Wing (Him Law), decided to pitch in with his therapy and psychiatry sessions.

The turning point was when Ka-On developed bad ulcers and finally coughed up blood (due to him straining the limits of his health for money). Ka-On didn't want to worry their mother and asked those that knew of his situation to remain quiet, however, Siu-Lan just had to bad-mouth Ka-On, saying he was probably doing something unfaithful and it earned the rage of the Kwan siblings. Ka-Hong slapped his own wife, Ka-Lok tearfully said she didn't know what was going on, and Ka-Wing called her a bitch. Afterwards, Siu-Lan apologized for her behavior and promised to improve, however, she merely toned down her bad habits.

Afterwards, to avoid further family troubles, Ka-On and his family decided to move out. With his recent contracts with Wang-Chim, he nearly saved enough money to buy a flat for his family. To hasten time, the couple agreed to send their daughter to her maternal grandparents while the two live in a small apartment until they finally saved enough to buy a flat. However, adjustment was difficult as Long-Kiu often missed her daughter. Long-Kiu would later meet Paul (an old colleague and Ka-On's rival for Long-Kiu's affection in the past) and he offered her a position in his bank to help her out.

Due to the constant money problems Ka-Hong experienced, he tried to find ways to make money despite his on-going recovery. He thought he finally struck big when overheard a business man making good money by selling and distributing tiles; he wants part of the action. Using the very money Ka-On gave him to help him recover, he lost it all after finding out he was scammed and was threatened to be sued without proper compensation. Siu-Lan wanted to tell this matter to Ka-On, hoping he'll save them again, but Ka-Hong was against it, feeling he owes too much to his brother already and they recently purchased a beautiful flat; telling Ka-On now would ruin everything.

Ka-Lok learned of the situation and asked Big Ding to help out. Sensing his girlfriend's desperation, he made a huge risk by following unreliable stock sources from his friend and he ended up owing people large sums of money as well. Feeling more desperate over the situation, Ka-Lok despaired and Wang-Chim came to the rescue. Using his vast wealth, he hired Big Ding on a trial basis for helping him invest in stocks; little did he know that Wang-Chim used his money to increase the value of the stocks to help save himself from debt and equally his pride. Wang-Chim also used his wealth to help save Ka-Hong and the family was saved from financial collapse once again.

Through all of this, Ka-Lok started to develop romantic feelings for Wang-Chim. However, she's not the kind of girl that goes after married men and she remained faithful to Big Ding until one major incident. Wang-Chim was presume dead after his scheduled flight on board a plane crashed and all hands were presumed dead. However, Wang-Chim lived and found a tearfully joyed Ka-Lok within his office. Seizing the moment, Wang-Chim told her not to lie to herself, that they both have feelings for each other. Unable to resist Wang-Chim, the two slept together and it would be the prelude of worse things to come.

Feeling severely guilty in sleeping with Wang-Chim, Ka-Lok convinced Big Ding to get married. Even though things were looking great, Ka-Lok's guilt over her infidelity was affecting her. She confided to Long-Kiu over what happened, explaining her debt to Wang-Chim was too great and she felt only her body was the only thing she can give him; it was guilt-sex and she thought about admitting it to Big Ding, but Long-Liu was against it. She warned Ka-Lok that Big Ding hates liars and event worst, infidelity (due to his father cheating on his mother and having an illegitimate son); keeping it a secret is the only way to have a happy life with Big Ding. Unfortunately, Wang-Chim wouldn't let Ka-Lok go. He confronted Ka-Lok outside her building and tried to convince her they belonged to each other. Sadly, Big Ding saw and heard the whole thing and ragingly left in tears and shock, ending their relationship.

With the help of Paul, Long-Kiu had an advantage over the other bank clerks and she quickly rose to the top. She even fought for early benefit rights to buy flats through her employee benefits package. The only thing left was to use the money they saved so hard to buy the flat. When Ka-On learned what happened to Ka-Lok, he was furious and he confronted Wang-Chim. He punched him and threw back the profits ($300,000 HK) he made from Wang-Chim as his way of severing all ties with him. However, that only threatened his own family. The recent flat they acquired was involved in a bitter battle between the former owners. After resolving their squabbles, they agreed to return the flat for them with some extra profit money to boot; the search for a new home continues. Unfortunately, Long-Kiu exploded in rage when she found out Ka-On threw away their hard-earned money for the sake of dignity against Wang-Chim. Only after some groveling that Long-Liu forgave Ka-On and the couple restarted saving again.

Meanwhile, Big Ding is at his lowest. Suffering from the emotional pain from Ka-Lok, he became a drunk and lost his job. He earlier unknowingly befriended Wang-Chim's little sister, Joyce Ko (JJ Jia), and she saved him from hurting himself at his darkest hour. Because she liked him, she begged her brother to allow Big Ding to work in his company. Still enraged over recent events, he feels working at Wang-Chim's company would give him a chance to get some revenge.

Big Ding began manipulating Joyce's feelings for him to play in his favor. Whenever Ka-Lok would be around, he would use Joyce to display his romantic affections and would hurt Ka-Lok's feelings as she still wants him back. In between the time, Wang-Chim actively chased after Ka-Lok behind his wife's back. Things between Ka-Lok and Big Ding went for the worst when he made good money and bought a large house. At his house warming party, he invited Ka-Lok and used Joyce to show she's the new woman in his life. Unable to bear the two together, Big Ding confronted Ka-Lok outside and told her he too can make big money and wants her to experience a taste of his pain of what she did to him. Horrified at the level of hatred and vengeance he's willing to take, Ka-Lok called for Wang-Chim to take her away and she slept with him for a second time in an emotionally devastated state.

Back at Big Ding's new home, Joyce gave him back his house keys and said the show was over. She revealed she knew she was being manipulated and didn't mind if it meant to make Big Ding happy. She admitted she had feelings for him and thought being his puppet would make him feel better, but it didn't as everything he did to this point only made him feel miserable. After a night of deep reflection, Big Ding went to see Joyce again, apologizing for his actions. He realized Joyce was the best thing to happen to him and he decided to let things go to be with Joyce. However, it was not without incurring the wrath of Wang-Chim.

Ka-On's money problems were large and Ting Hoi, Big Ding's dad and Ka-On's master, thought he could help ease his disciple's troubles by buying cheaper materials. However, things got messy when he left the job to see his sickened illegitimate son in China on short notice. In his haste, he failed to properly notify Ka-On that he loosened one of the windows and it fell right over, injuring a bystander. The police charged him with reckless endangerment, but also discovered the construction materials used was stolen goods and he might face jail time for illegally using stolen goods. Ka-On knew it was his master's unintentional fault and decided to keep quiet over the matter; it would mean jail time for him. When Ting Hoi learned of this, he tried to turn himself in as he tried to do the right thing and save his disciple, but things worked out as the original dealer was jailed. Little did they know that it was because Ka-Lok went to see Wang-Chim and he used his wealth once again to dig them out of trouble. Multiple events would later collide as things begin falling into full circle.

Ka-On became jealous of his wife's late night activities with Paul. Long-Kiu was securing banking contracts by courting potential clients through Paul, but Ka-On felt insecure about the matter. When he saw Long-Liu taking a drunken Paul back to his apt, he thought the worse and accused her of having an affair. Tired of his attitude, she ran back to her parents' home and Ka-On unsuccessfully tried to beg her back. After intercepting her at her parents' door, she suggested separating as she couldn't tolerate his behavior anymore. She said she was tired of her being second priority as Ka-On would do whatever he can for friends and family, except for his own wife's and daughter's interest. Ka-On tried to reason with his wife, but at the same time, Mah-Wah demanded his attention over exposing her knowledge of his sister's relationship with her husband; he once again chose his family over his wife.

Infuriated that his little sister maintained a relationship with Wang-Chim, he confronted her during a family dinner and slapped her for her foolishness. However, Ka-On got slapped back by their mother and asked was he even sure over the situation. Mother Kwan then sat Ka-On down and warned him that his concerns over other people is causing a serious rift with his wife and it's better to tend to his personal matters than worrying over his little sister. Being the dutiful son, he listened and left it alone. Eventually, family life would improve again. In a time of temporary peace, Ka-On managed to convince his wife to come join him in the clan's big family dinner gathering and the whole family was looking forward to dinner with mom until they found her on the floor. Mother Kwan had suffered a stroke and couldn't be saved.

The entire Kwan family was devastated over losing their matriarch and Ka-On developed an eye condition due to the stress of everything. His eyes began to see the world like film negatives and the doctor warned him it's a serious condition and may lead to blindness. However, he kept things quiet to his family. The family started to divide up the precious mementos of their mother and things got heated when Ka-Hong and Siu-Lan wanted Ka-On to sign a legal document to release ownership of the flat to them. The other siblings were infuriated that Siu-Lan would pick such a time to battle ownership of the flat and it put the siblings at odds as Ka-Hong and Siu-Lan refused to give and claimed that Mother Kwan agreed to give it up to them. Tired of sacrificing all he ever earned in life, Ka-On refused to sign the flat over.

Ka-On would eventually tell his wife about his eye problems. He no longer wishes to battle things with his wife and the two reconciled their relationship. Seeing how he was to fight over the flat, she actually reminded him he wasn't like this to family before and he should reconsider things due to risk-escalation with Ka-Hong. Eventually, Ka-On found a quiet old house at a rural area in HK and decided to buy and rebuild the place as his own; he planned to give the flat to Ka-Hong as intended. Long-Kiu decided to move back with Ka-On and agreed to restart life with him in the new house, but things got hard once again when there was a dispute over land ownership. Although they bought the land from the owner, one of the relatives claimed it was not legit and demanded his land back and caused a fight. It resulted with Ka-On suffering a head injury from getting hit by one of his assailants.

In between, it was discovered that Ka-Hong had serious money troubles again and intended to leverage the flat to save themselves. Outraged by what has happened, Long-Kiu lectured Ka-Hong and Siu-Lan over the sacrifices Ka-On has made for them and their ungrateful behavior. Elsewhere, Wang-Chim's affair and controlling nature over his family got out of control. Joyce ran off to be independent of her brother and to be with Big Ding, but Wang-Chim always tried to ways to make his life difficult or tempt him with a bribe to get him to break things off, but never worked. Mah-Wah went through very difficult times to get herself pregnant, hoping the baby would convince him to break things off with Ka-Lok, but that never happened and she lost the baby.

In an attempt to regain control if his world, Wang-Chim confronted Big Ding and offered him riches if he stayed away from Joyce, but he refused. Then the subject of Ka-Lok came and it was finally revealed that Ka-Lok used her body to save both him and her family and not because she was a money-loving cheater. Big Ding panicked in a rage and guilt when he realized he caused that much pain to Ka-Lok. He ended up in a bad car crash and was later recovered thanks to Ka-Lok's efforts to find him.

Wang-Chim started to become desperate as his world started to fall apart. His wife decided to ruin his life by destroying his fortune. Just so happens, one of his big co-investors is a good friend to Man-Wah and he convinced other investors to opt out on his recent business plans to punish his misdeeds. He then tried to reconcile with Ka-Lok, saying he wants to marry her to prove his love for her, but she got tired of him and told him to wake up from his illusions. Not willing to lose his empire, he caused a fire in attempt to salvage his investments, but it resulted in several lives. He was ultimately charged with arson and sent to jail.

In the finality of the story, family peace would finally come as Ka-On's eye condition was miraculously recovered from that head injury he got earlier. Ka-Hong and his family informed him that they worked things out with the landowner of his new home and the couple agreed to live there from now on as tenants to him; Ka-On was happy to know that their mother's flat now belongs to them. In a private meeting between Ka-Lok and Joyce, Ka-Lok felt that too many things happened between her and Big Ding, that those irreversible changes would always scar their relationship; she bowed out in hopes Joyce and Big Ding would have a great life together. Ka-Lok would eventually move overseas to study and restart life. Wang-Chim would ultimately reconcile with his wife and even though in jail, she intends to wait for his release. Sometime later, the Kwan family would be reunited in a big family dinner, celebrating their lives and each other.

== Awards and nominations ==
2012 TVB Anniversary Awards

- Won: Most Improved Male Artiste (Oscar Leung)
- Won: Most Improved Female Artiste (Mandy Wong)
- Nominated: Best Drama
- Nominated: Best Supporting Actor (Oscar Leung)
- Nominated: Best Supporting Actress (Mandy Wong)
- Nominated: Most Improved Male Artiste (Him Law)

2012 MY AOD Favourite Awards

- Won: My Favourite Top 15 Television Characters (Ding Koon-fung - Ron Ng)
- Won: My Favourite Most Promising Male Artiste (Oscar Leung)
- Won: My Favourite Most Promising Female Artiste (Mandy Wong)
- Nominated: My Favourite Supporting Actress (Mandy Wong)
- Nominated: My Favourite Outstanding Artiste (Mandy Wong)

== Viewership ratings ==
	Week	Episodes	Average Points	Peaking Points	References
1	January 3–6, 2012	1 — 4	27	30	
2	January 9–13, 2012	5 — 9	27	31	
3	January 16–20, 2012	10 — 14	26	30	
4	January 24–27, 2012	15 — 18	26	32	
5	January 30 - February 3, 2012	19 — 23	29	34	
6	February 6–10, 2012	24 — 28	30	36	
6	February 12, 2012	29 — 30 (Finale)	36	40	
