= CLC discography =

Band discography

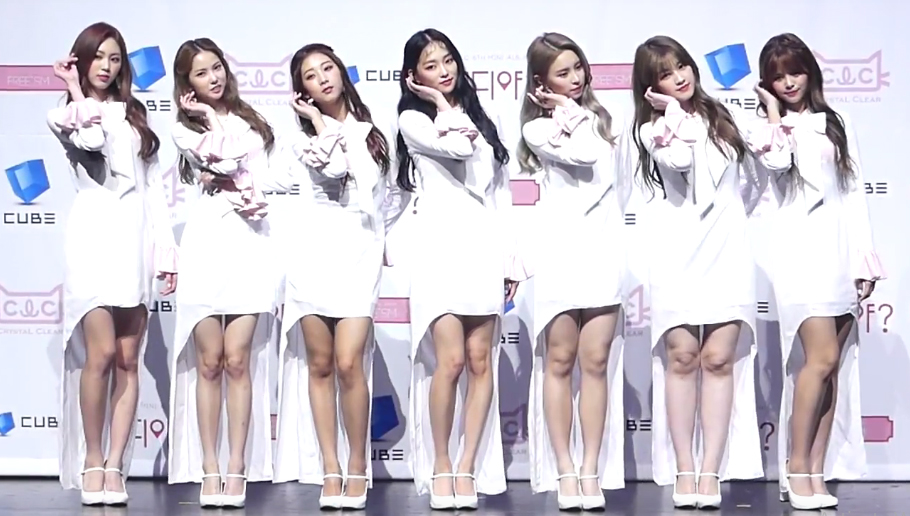
- EPs: 10
- Soundtrack albums: 4
- Singles: 14
- Music videos: 14
- Single albums: 1

The discography of South Korean girl group CLC consists of one single album, ten extended plays and fourteen singles.

== Extended plays ==
List of extended plays, with selected chart positions and sales
Title	Details	Peak chart positions					Sales
Title	Details	KOR	JPN	US Heat.	US Ind.	US World	Sales
First Love	Released: March 19, 2015 (KOR); Label: Cube Entertainment; Formats: CD, digital download	9	—	—	—	—	KOR: 5,277
Question	Released: May 28, 2015 (KOR); Label: Cube Entertainment; Formats: CD, digital download	9	—	—	—	—	KOR: 4,634
Refresh	Released: February 29, 2016 (KOR); Label: Cube Entertainment; Formats: CD, digital download	6	—	—	—	—	KOR: 2,737
High Heels	Released: April 13, 2016 (JPN); Label: Cube Entertainment Japan; Formats: CD, digital download	—	23	—	—	—	JPN: 2,599
Nu.Clear	Released: May 30, 2016 (KOR); Label: Cube Entertainment; Formats: CD, digital download	16	—	—	—	—	KOR: 4,593
Chamisma	Released: July 27, 2016 (JPN); Label: Cube Entertainment Japan; Formats: CD, digital download	—	16	—	—	—	JPN: 4,775
Crystyle	Released: January 17, 2017 (KOR); Label: Cube Entertainment; Formats: CD, digital download	10	—	—	—	6	KOR: 5,769
Free'sm	Released: August 3, 2017 (KOR); Label: Cube Entertainment; Formats: CD, digital download	10	—	—	—	14	KOR: 4,355
Black Dress	Released: February 22, 2018 (KOR); Label: Cube Entertainment; Formats: CD, digital download	12	—	—	—	7	KOR: 8,016
No.1	Released: January 30, 2019 (KOR); Label: Cube Entertainment; Formats: CD, digital download	4	—	19	49	5	KOR: 12,302; US: 1,000
"—" denotes releases that did not chart or were not released in that region.

== Single albums ==
List of single albums, with selected chart positions and sales
Title	Details	Peak chart positions	Sales
Title	Details	KOR	Sales
Helicopter	Released: September 2, 2020; Label: Cube Entertainment; Formats: CD, digital download	8	KOR: 18,987

== Singles ==
Title	Year	Peak chart positions			Sales (Note: Sales figures for tracks are based on digital downloads, except noted.)	Album
Title	Year	KOR	KOR Hot	US World	Sales	Album
"Pepe"	2015	143	—	—	KOR: 34,690	First Love
"Eighteen"	2015	— (Note: "Eighteen" did not enter the Gaon Digital chart top 100, but peaked at no. 370 on the Gaon Domestic Digital Chart.)	—	—	KOR: 8,193	Refresh
"Like" (궁금해)	2015	173	—	—	KOR: 21,104	Question
"High Heels" (예뻐지게) (Note: "High Heels (Japanese ver.)" was released on April 13, 2016 as the title track from the group's Japanese debut mini album, High Heels.)	2016	120	—	—	KOR: 14,278	Refresh & High Heels
"No Oh Oh" (아니야)	2016	144	—	—	KOR: 17,484	Nu.Clear
"Chamisma"	2016	—	—	—	—N/a	Chamisma
"Hobgoblin" (도깨비)	2017	—	—	4	US: 9,000	Crystyle
"Where Are You?" (어디야?)	2017	—	—	—	—N/a	Free'sm
"To the Sky"	2018	—	—	—	—N/a	Black Dress
"Black Dress"	2018	—	—	5	—N/a	Black Dress
"No"	2019	— (Note: "No" did not enter the Gaon Digital Chart top 200, but appeared at number 111 on the Download component chart.)	—	4	US: 1,000	No.1
"Me" (美)	2019	—	—	5	US: 1,000	Non-album singles
"Devil"	2019	— (Note: "Devil" did not enter the Gaon Digital Chart top 200, but appeared at number 154 on the Download component chart.)	—	7	US: 1,000	Non-album singles
"Helicopter"	2020	— (Note: "Helicopter" did not enter the Gaon Digital Chart top 200, but appeared at number 116 on the Download component chart.)	87	6	—N/a	Helicopter
"—" denotes releases that did not chart or were not released in that region.

== Soundtrack appearances ==
Title	Year	Member(s)	Album
"Remember Your Wish" (지금은 연구중)	2015	Seunghee, Yujin, Seungyeon, Sorn, Yeeun	Ar:piel OST
"Pounding Love" (두근두근 러브)	2016	Seunghee, Yujin, Seungyeon, Sorn, Yeeun	Choco Bank OST
"Really Bad Guy" (오빠나빠요)	2019	Seunghee, Yeeun	My Fellow Citizens! OST
"Another Level"	2021	Seunghee, Seungyeon, Yeeun	Be My Boyfriend OST
"My Love, My Destiny, My Reason" (나의 사랑, 운명, 이유)	2021	Seunghee	Pumpkin Time OST
"Once Again"	2022	Seunghee	Once Again OST

== Compilation appearances ==
Title	Year	Album
"Gone with the Wind" (바람과 함께 사라지다)	2019	Immortal Songs: Singing the Legend (A hot love story that resonates in the heart, Lim Chang-jung)

== Collaborations ==
Title	Year	Other artist(s)	Album
"Special Christmas"	2016	Hyuna, Jang Hyun-seung, BtoB, Roh Ji-hoon, Pentagon	2016 United Cube Project 1
"Follow Your Dreams" (한걸음)	2018	Hyuna, Jo Kwon, BtoB, Pentagon, Yoo Seon-ho, (G)I-DLE	2018 United Cube ONE
"Upgrade"	2018	Hyuna, Jo Kwon, BtoB, Pentagon, Yoo Seon-ho, (G)I-DLE	2018 United Cube ONE
"Young & One"	2018	Hyuna, Jo Kwon, BtoB, Pentagon, Yoo Seon-ho, (G)I-DLE	2018 United Cube ONE
"Mermaid"	2018	Yeeun with Lee Min-hyuk, Peniel Shin, Jung Il-hoon, Wooseok (Pentagon) and Jeon So-yeon	2018 United Cube ONE

== Music videos ==
Title	Year	Director	Notes
"Pepe"	2015	Hong Won-ki (Zanybros)	
"Like"	2015	Hong Won-ki (Zanybros)	
"High Heels"	2016	Hong Won-ki (Zanybros)	"Short Version" also released
"High Heels (Japanese Ver.)"	2016	Hong Won-ki (Zanybros)	"Japanese Subtitled Version" also released
"No Oh Oh"	2016	Im Seong-gwan (Purple Straw Film)	"Performance Version" also released
"Chamisma"	2016	JOO HEESUN	
"Chamisma (feat. Ilhoon of BTOB)"	2016	JOO HEESUN	
"Hobgoblin"	2017	Vikings League	"Performance Version" also released
"Where Are You?"	2017	Shin Hee-won	
“Summer Kiss”	2017	Unknown	Performance Video
"I Like It"	2017	Unknown	Performance Video
"Black Dress"	2018	Kim Jakyoung (flexiblepictures)	
"Distance"	2018	Unknown	
"No"	2019	Kim Jakyoung (flexiblepictures)	
"Me"	2019	Zanybros	
"Devil"	2019	Zanybros	
"Helicopter"	2020	Jang Jaehyeok, Lee Kyeongsoon (BIBBIDI BOBBIDI BOO.)	
"Helicopter (English Ver.)"	2020	Jang Jaehyeok, Lee Kyeongsoon (BIBBIDI BOBBIDI BOO.)	"Official Lyric Video" also released

== See also ==
- List of songs recorded by CLC
