= List of songs recorded by CLC =

South Korean girl group CLC have released one single album, ten extended plays, and fourteen singles since their debut in 2015.

Key
†	Single
	Pre-release single
‡	Song available in Korean and Japanese

== 0-9 ==
Song	Writer			Album/Single	Year	Language	Ref.
Song	Lyrics	Composition	Arrangement	Album/Single	Year	Language	Ref.
"7th" (일곱번째; ilgob beonjjae)	Cho Sung-ho; Kang Dong-ha; Jang Ye-eun	Cho Sung-ho; Kang Dong-ha		Black Dress	2018	Korean	

== B ==
Song	Writer			Album/Single	Year	Language	Ref.
Song	Lyrics	Composition	Arrangement	Album/Single	Year	Language	Ref.
"Bae"	Big Sancho; Park Haeil; Jang Ye-eun	Big Sancho; Park Haeil		Free'sm	2017	Korean	
"Black Dress" †	Cho Sung-ho; FERDY; Kang Dong-ha; Jang Ye-eun	Cho Sung-ho; FERDY; Kang Dong-ha		Black Dress	2018	Korean	
"Breakdown"	Choi Young-kyung; Jang Ye-eun	Simon Petren; Choi Young-kyung 추대관 (MonoTree)	Simon Petren	No.1	2019	Korean	

== C ==
Song	Writer			Album/Single	Year	Language	Ref.
Song	Lyrics	Composition	Arrangement	Album/Single	Year	Language	Ref.
"Cafe Mocha Please" (카페모카 주세요)	Jung Il-hoon	Seo Jae-woo; FERDY		First Love	2015	Korean	
"Curious (Like)" (궁금해) ‡	Big Sancho; Seo Jaewoo; Son Youngjin			Question	2015	Korean	
"Curious (Like)" (궁금해) ‡	Big Sancho; Seo Jaewoo; Son Youngjin			High Heels	2016	Japanese	
"Chamisma" (チャミスマ) †				Chamisma	2016	Japanese	
"Chocolate Spice"				Chamisma	2016	Japanese	
"Call My Name"	Shin Agnes (MonoTree)	Chu Daegwan (MonoTree); Nopari	Nopari	Free'sm	2017	Korean	

== D ==
Song	Writer			Album/Single	Year	Language	Ref.
Song	Lyrics	Composition	Arrangement	Album/Single	Year	Language	Ref.
"Day By Day"	Big Sancho; Son Young-jin; FERDY; Jang Ye-eun	Big Sancho; Son Young-jin; FERDY		Nu.Clear	2016	Korean	
"Dear My Friend"	Jo Sung-ho; FERDY			Nu.Clear	2016	Korean	
"Depression" (눈물병; Nunmulbyeong)	Son Young-jin; Jo Sung-ho			Crystyle	2017	Korean	
"Distance" (선; seon)	Seo Jae-woo; Cho Sung-ho; Jang Ye-eun	Seo Jae-woo; Cho Sung-ho		Black Dress	2018	Korean	
"Devil" †	Seo Ji-eum; Jang Ye-eun	Mich Hansen; Peter Wallevik; Daniel Davidsen; Phil Plested; Lauren Aquilina	Mich Hansen; Peter Wallevik; Daniel Davidsen	Digital single	2019	Korean	

== E ==
Song	Writer			Album/Single	Year	Language	Ref.
Song	Lyrics	Composition	Arrangement	Album/Single	Year	Language	Ref.
"Eighteen" †	Kim Geon-woo		Kim Geon-woo; Song Gi-hong	Digital single	2015	Korean	
"Eighteen" †	Kim Geon-woo		Kim Geon-woo; Song Gi-hong	Refresh	2016	Korean	

== F ==
Song	Writer			Album/Single	Year	Language	Ref.
Song	Lyrics	Composition	Arrangement	Album/Single	Year	Language	Ref.
"First Love" ‡ (첫사랑)	Jo Seong-ho; FERDY			First Love	2015	Korean	
"First Love" ‡ (첫사랑)	Jo Seong-ho; FERDY			High Heels	2016	Japanese	
"Friend Lover Zone" (오빠친구; Oppachingu)	Jung Il-hoon	FERDY; Adam Kulling; Alice Gernanot	FERDY; Adam Kulling	Refresh	2016	Korean	

== G ==
Song	Writer			Album/Single	Year	Language	Ref.
Song	Lyrics	Composition	Arrangement	Album/Single	Year	Language	Ref.
"Gakuen Tengoku" (学園天国)				Chamisma	2016	English	

== H ==
Song	Writer			Album/Single	Year	Language	Ref.
Song	Lyrics	Composition	Arrangement	Album/Single	Year	Language	Ref.
"Hey-Yo"	Big Sancho; FERDY; Lee Brian D	Big Sancho; FERDY		Question	2015	Korean	
"Hide and Seek" (숨바꼭질)	Jung Il-hoon	Jo Sung-ho; FERDY		Question	2015	Korean	
"High Heels" (예뻐지게; Yeppeojige) ‡	No Jun-hwan; Iggy	Lee Hyun-seung; DOM	Lee Hyun-seung; DOM; Jeinho	Refresh	2016	Korean	
"High Heels" (예뻐지게; Yeppeojige) ‡	No Jun-hwan; Iggy	Lee Hyun-seung; DOM	Lee Hyun-seung; DOM; Jeinho	High Heels	2016	Japanese	
"Hobgoblin" (도깨비; Dokkaebi)	Hyuna; Seo Jae-woo; Big Sancho; Son Young-jin	Seo Jae-woo; Big Sancho; Son Yeong-jin		Crystyle	2017	Korean	
"Hold Your Hand" (잡아줄게; jab-ajulge)	Son Young-jin; Kang Dong-ha; Jang Ye-eun	Son Young-jin; Kang Dong-ha		Free'sm	2017	Korean	
"Helicopter"	Hyuk Shin (153/Joombas); Melanie Joy Fontana; Michael "Lindgren" Schulz; Jisoo Park (153/Joombas)	조윤경 (Cho YounKyoung); Jang Ye-eun; BreadBeat (TENTEN)	Michael "Lindgren" Schulz	Helicopter	2020	Korean	
"Helicopter"	Hyuk Shin (153/Joombas); Melanie Joy Fontana; Michael "Lindgren" Schulz; Jisoo Park (153/Joombas)	조윤경 (Cho YounKyoung); Jang Ye-eun; BreadBeat (TENTEN); Melanie Joy Fontana (English lyrics)	Michael "Lindgren" Schulz	Helicopter	2020	English	

== I ==
Song	Writer			Album/Single	Year	Language	Ref.
Song	Lyrics	Composition	Arrangement	Album/Single	Year	Language	Ref.
"I Should Be So Lucky"				High Heels	2016	English	
"It's Too Late" (진작에)	FERDY; Jang Ye-eun	FERDY		Nu.Clear	2016	Korean	
"I Mean That" (말이야; Malliya)	Son Young-jin; Kang Dong-ha; Jang Ye-eun	Son Young-jin; Kang Dong-ha		Crystyle	2017	Korean	
"I Like It" (즐겨; jeulgyeo)	Son Jae-woo; Kang Dong-ha; Jang Ye-eun	Son Jae-woo; Kang Dong-ha; Nick Holiday; Nikki Paige	Son Jae-woo; Kang Dong-ha; Nick Holiday	Free'sm	2017	Korean	
"I Need U"	Anna Timgren; VINCENZO; Fuxxy; Any Masingga; Jang Ye-eun	VINCENZO; Fuxxy; Any Masingga; Anna Timgren	VINCENZO; Fuxxy	No.1	2019	English	

== L ==
Song	Writer			Album/Single	Year	Language	Ref.
Song	Lyrics	Composition	Arrangement	Album/Single	Year	Language	Ref.
"Lucky"	Duble Sidekick; Seion; David Kim	Duble Sidekick; Seion	영광의 얼굴들	Question	2015	Korean	
"Liar"	Big Sancho; Yorkie	Devine Channel; Holiday		Crystyle	2017	Korean	
"Like That"	Jaeri Potter; Jang Ye-eun; Kwon Eun-bin	NOPARI; MonoTree; Jaeri Potter	MonoTree; NOPARI	Black Dress	2018	Korean	
"Like It"	Kim Yeon-seo; The Proof; Jang Ye-eun	The Proof; Kim Yeon-seo	The Proof	No.1	2019	Korean	

== M ==
Song	Writer			Album/Single	Year	Language	Ref.
Song	Lyrics	Composition	Arrangement	Album/Single	Year	Language	Ref.
"Meow Meow" (미유미유)	Son Young-jin; Jo Sung-ho	Son Young-jin; Jo Sung-ho; Geoff Earley; Devine Channel	Son Young-jin; Geoff Earley	Crystyle	2017	Korean	
"Mistake"	Big Sancho; FERDY; Jang Ye-eun	Big Sancho; FERDY; Devine Channel	Big Sancho; FERDY	Crystyle	2017	Korean	
"Me (美)"	MosPick; Jang Ye-eun	MosPick		Digital single	2019	Korean	

== N ==
Song	Writer			Album/Single	Year	Language	Ref.
Song	Lyrics	Composition	Arrangement	Album/Single	Year	Language	Ref.
"No Oh Oh" (아니야) †	Shinsadong Tiger; Beom & Nang; Jang Ye-eun	Shinsadong Tiger; Beom & Nang	Shinsadong Tiger	Nu.Clear	2016	Korean	
"No" †	Jeon So-yeon; Jang Ye-eun	Jeon So-yeon; June		No.1	2019	Korean	

== O ==
Song	Writer			Album/Single	Year	Language	Ref.
Song	Lyrics	Composition	Arrangement	Album/Single	Year	Language	Ref.
"Open The Window" (창문을 열고)	Seo Jae-woo; Seo Yong-bae; Jung Il-hoon	Seo Jae-woo; Seo Yong-bae		First Love	2015	Korean	
"One, Two, Three" ‡ (하나, 둘, 셋)	Seo EBum; Lee Sangchul; BPM			Nu.Clear	2016	Korean	
"1,2,3"				Chamisma	2016	Japanese	

== P ==
Song	Writer			Album/Single	Year	Language	Ref.
Song	Lyrics	Composition	Arrangement	Album/Single	Year	Language	Ref.
"Pepe" †‡	Long Candy	Duble Sidekick; Yanggang	Yanggang	First Love	2015	Korean	
"Pepe" †‡	Long Candy	Duble Sidekick; Yanggang	Yanggang	High Heels	2016	Japanese	

== R ==
Song	Writer			Album/Single	Year	Language	Ref.
Song	Lyrics	Composition	Arrangement	Album/Single	Year	Language	Ref.
"Refresh"	GHIGH; GDLO (Mono Tree)	GHIGH; GDLO; Choi Young-kyung (Mono Tree)	GHIGH; GDLO (Mono Tree)	Refresh	2016	Korean	

== S ==
Song	Writer			Album/Single	Year	Language	Ref.
Song	Lyrics	Composition	Arrangement	Album/Single	Year	Language	Ref.
"Sharala" (샤랄라)	ZigZag Note; MAFLY 노는어린니	ZigZag Note 노는어린니		First Love	2015	Korean	
"Sukidoki" (スキドキ)				Chamisma	2016	Japanese	
"Summer Kiss"	Sweetch; Jerry.L		Sweetch; Torry K	Free'sm	2017	Korean	
"Show"	Dally; Seo Jae-woo (TENTEN); BreadBeat (TENTEN); June; Jang Ye-eun	Seo Jae-woo (TENTEN); BreadBeat (TENTEN); June		No.1	2019	Korean	

== T ==
Song	Writer			Album/Single	Year	Language	Ref.
Song	Lyrics	Composition	Arrangement	Album/Single	Year	Language	Ref.
"To the Sky"	Cho Sung-ho; FERDY; Jang Ye-eun	Cho Sung-ho; Ferdy		Black Dress	2018	Korean	

== W ==
Song	Writer			Album/Single	Year	Language	Ref.
Song	Lyrics	Composition	Arrangement	Album/Single	Year	Language	Ref.
"What Do I Do" (어쩌죠)	Big Sancho; Son Young-jin	Son Young-jin		Question	2015	Korean	
"What Planet Are You From?" (어느 별에서 왔니)	Son Young-jin; Jo Sung-ho; Jang Ye-eun	Son Young-jin; Jo Sung-ho		Nu.Clear	2016	Korean	
"Where are You?" (어디야?; eodiya?)	Armadillo		Armadillo; Dani; Gu Seongcheol	Free'sm	2017	Korean	

== Y ==
Song	Writer			Album/Single	Year	Language	Ref.
Song	Lyrics	Composition	Arrangement	Album/Single	Year	Language	Ref.
"Yaya (Say Bye to Solo)"	Big Sancho			Refresh	2016	Korean	

== Other songs ==
Year	Song	Artist(s)	Album/Single	Ref.
2012	"Because You Are The One"	G.NA with Sorn	Oui	
2013	"Perfume"	Yang Yo-seob with Oh Seung-hee	Cube Voice Project Part 1	
2014	"Curious"	Yook Sung-jae with Oh Seung-hee	Plus Nine Boys OST Part 4	
2014	"Family"	All with Got7 & B1A4	Smart School Uniforms	
2015	"Remember Your Wish" (주문을 외울게)	All	Ar:piel	
2015	"A Little Scientist" (지금은 연구중)	All	Ar:piel	
2015	"Pick Me"	Eunbin	Digital single	
2016	"Pounding Love"	All	Choco Bank OST Part 1	
2016	"Don't Matter" (Splendid Rivers & Mountains (화려강산))	Eunbin	35 Girls 5 Concepts	
2016	"After the Play Ends" (연극이 끝난 후)	Changsub, Minhyuk (with Elkie)	After the Play Ends OST	
2016	"Mom"	Oh Seung-hee & Kim Bo-hyung	Girl Spirit	
2016	"Special Christmas"	All (with Jang Hyun-seung, Kim Hyun-ah, Roh Ji Hoon, BtoB, CLC, Pentagon)	2016 United Cube Project Part 1	
2018	"Upgrade"	All	ONE	
2018	"Mermaid"	All	ONE	
2018	"Follow Your Dreams" (한걸음)	All	ONE	
2018	"Young & One"	All	ONE	
2018	"First Love" (Chinese version)	All	The Best Meeting OST	
2019	"Really Bad Guy" (오빠나빠요)	Oh Seung-hee & Yeeun	My Fellow Citizens! OST Part 3	
2021	"Another Level"	Seunghee, Seungyeon, & Yeeun	Be My Boyfriend OST	
2021	"My Love, My Destiny, My Reason" (나의 사랑, 운명, 이유)	Oh Seung-hee	Pumpkin Time OST	
2022	"Once Again"	Oh Seung-hee	Melody of Time OST	

== See also ==
- CLC discography
