= Choi Yu-jin =

South Korean singer (born 1996)

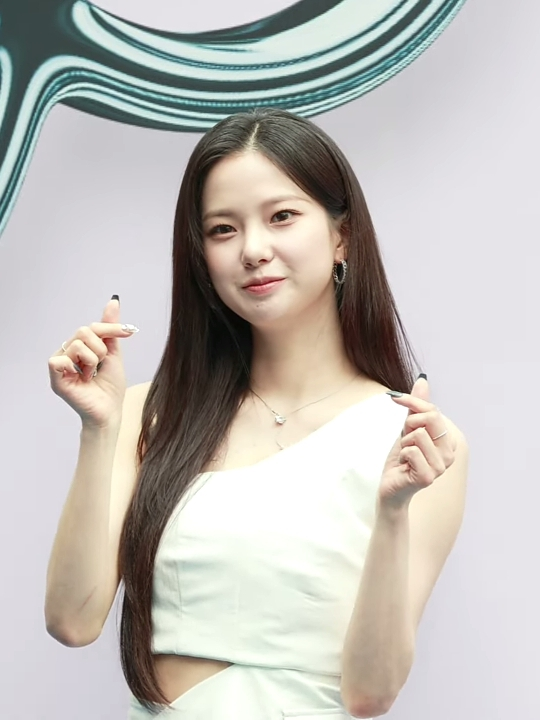
- Choi in 2024
- Born: August 12, 1996 (age 30); Jeonju, South Korea
- Education: Hanlim Multi Art School
- Occupations: Singer; actress
- Awards: Full list
- Musical career
- Genres: K-pop; Dance-pop
- Instrument: Vocals
- Years active: 2013–present
- Labels: Cube; WakeOne (Note: As a member of Kep1er only.); Swing; Else
- Member of: Kep1er
- Formerly of: CLC; Cube Girls; United Cube

Korean name
- Hangul: 최유진
- RR: Choe Yujin
- MR: Ch'oe Yujin

Choi Yu-jin (Korean: 최유진; born August 12, 1996), known mononymously as Yujin, is a South Korean singer and actress. Originally debuting in 2015 as a member of the South Korean girl group CLC, she is a member and leader of Kep1er after finishing in third place in the final episode of the survival show Girls Planet 999. She began her acting career in 2016 in a supporting role in the Naver TV web drama, Nightmare High.

== Early life ==
Choi Yu-jin was born on August 12, 1996, in Wansan District, Jeonju, South Korea. She attended high school at Hanlim Multi Art School and graduated in February 2015.

== Career ==
=== Pre-debut ===
Choi is the longest-serving trainee among CLC members, having been a trainee for over 4 years prior to her debut in 2015.

As a trainee, Choi created and taught BtoB's Ilhoon the 'Gwiyomi Player' aegyo, which he would later popularise on the South Korean Idol variety show, Weekly Idol. In 2013, South Korean singer, Hari released "Gwiyomi Song" inspired by the gesture Choi created.

In 2013, Choi collaborated with then-Cube artist and Beast member Yang Yo-seob in "Perfume" which was released on April 30 as part of Cube Entertainment's first "Voice Project". She was credited under the pre-debut group Cube Girls.

In 2014, alongside three of the soon-to-be CLC members, Sorn, Seungyeon and Yeeun, Choi appeared in BtoB's "Beep Beep" music video. In the same year, all five of the original members of CLC appeared in G.NA's "G.NA's Secret" music video and participated in promotional activities as backing dancers. In 2015, the quintet did a voluntary street busking performances to help children with developmental disabilities, attracting attention as a warm 'Hongdae idol' as part of their pre-debut activities. They released a self-composed song "You're My Love" (Korean: 유어 마이 러브) on March 13, 2013, through the online music site Melon and the official YouTube channel.

=== 2015–2020: Debut with CLC and acting debut ===
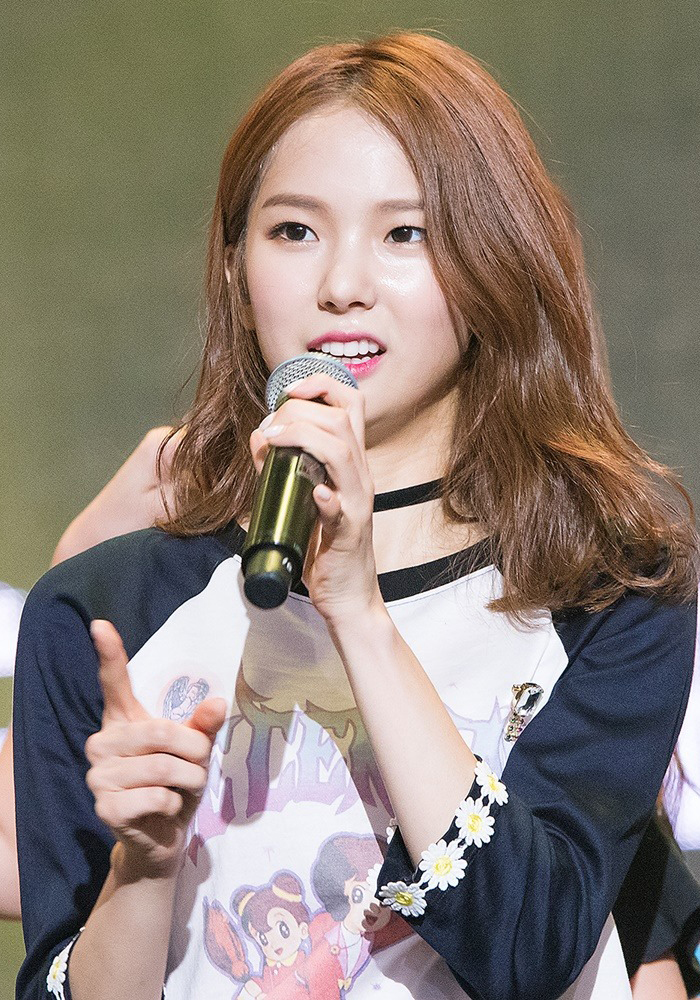
Choi at MTV Asia Music Stage in September 2016.

On March 13, 2015, Cube Entertainment released the profile information and images of Choi as the fourth member of CLC following Yeeun, Sorn, and Seungyeon, through their official social media. In Cube's words: "Choi Yu-jin, who has all the visual elements to be called a 'heavenly idol', aims to become the strongest idol's 'proportioner' with an unusual physical condition." She was introduced as a vocalist and dancer of the group and can cross various genres such as belly dance, popping, rocking, and house dance with a high understanding and expressiveness of dance performance. Along with member Seungyeon, she is considered to be one of CLC's 'top two dancers'. Choi and fellow CLC members were also chosen as the new model for a Korea's clothing brand, SMART Uniform, alongside Got7 and B1A4.

Choi made her debut as a member of CLC on May 19, 2015, with the release of the single "Pepe" off the five-track EP First Love, of which all the proceeds were donated to children with developmental disabilities.

On August 17, 2015, she joined the cast of Real Man for the third season's female soldier special as the youngest member among the ten entertainers including rapper Jessi, Japanese broadcaster Sayuri Fujita and former national tennis player Jeon Mi-ra. She gained wider recognition after joining the show, where she drew attention over her small face and slender body frame, measuring 162 cm and 42 kg, taking first place in push-ups despite her skinny arms that couldn't even measure blood pressure. Later, she went viral with the caption "Choi Yu-jin's 3-stage transformation into a female soldier" from a 'pretty and fresh girl' to a 'dignified baby soldier' for which she received the nickname "Baby Soldier" and "Patriotic Idol" from soldiers of the Armed Forces and viewers of the show. Choi's appearance on the show ended in late September 2015. At the end of the year, Choi shared a stage with cast member Jessi and Kim Hyun-sook performing S.E.S' "I'm Your Girl" at the 2015 MBC Entertainment Awards.

In 2016, Choi made her acting debut in the Naver TV web drama Nightmare High as Cheon Yoo-na. The same year, she was cast as one of the female leads in Green Fever, a prequel to Lily Fever (2015). She plays the role of a rookie actor who has emerged as the nation's little sister and is the only actress affiliated with Jin Entertainment. She worked with Kim Hye-jun and Jung Yeon-joo.

=== 2021–present: Girls Planet 999, debut with Kep1er, and CLC cease activities ===
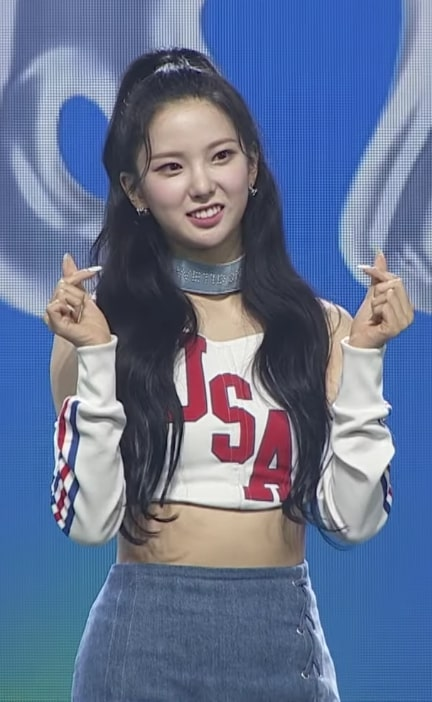
Choi in June 2022.

In 2021, Choi made a cameo in the Netflix drama, So Not Worth It. In June 2021, Choi joined the Mnet survival show Girls Planet 999 as one of the program's 33 Korean contestants. She consistently ranked in the Top 9 as the show progressed and ultimately finished in 3rd place, allowing her to debut with the winning group, Kep1er, as the leader.

On December 3, 2021, it was revealed that Choi would be starring in the web drama Pumpkin Time which premiered December 14, 2021. On May 20, 2022, Cube Entertainment announced that CLC had ceased being active.

On May 30, 2024, Choi was confirmed to be in the lineup of Kep1er members who had renewed their contract with WakeOne Entertainment.

On July 6, 2026, Else Entertainment announced through its official Instagram account that Choi had signed with the agency. On August 29 and 30, Yujin rejoined CLC for their tenth anniversary concerts, After All, in Hong Kong.

== Discography ==
=== Singles ===
Title	Year	Peak chart positions	Sales	Album
Title	Year	KOR	Sales	Album
"Perfume" with Yang Yo-seob (as Cube Girls)	2013	22	KOR: 172,881	Non-album singles
"Follow your dreams" with United Cube (U-CUBE)	2018	—	—N/a	Non-album singles
"—" denotes releases that did not chart or were not released in that region.

=== Soundtrack appearances ===
Title	Year	Album
"See U There" with Choi Byung-chan and Xion (Oneus)	2024	Unknown Untitled Unmastered OST

=== Songwriting credits ===
Year	Artist	Song	Album	Lyrics	Music
2015	CLC (pre-debut)	"You're My Love"	Non-album single	Yes	Yes

== Filmography ==
=== Web series ===
Year	Title	Role	Notes	Ref.
2016	Nightmare High	Cheon Yoo-na	Guest role in Ep 10	
2017	Green Fever	Yoo Jin		
2021	Her Bucket List	Lee Sae-hyun	Guest role in Ep 4	
2021	So Not Worth It	Han Hyun-ah	Guest role in Ep 9 & 10	
2021–2022	Pumpkin Time	Han Su		
2024	Unknown Untitled Unmastered [UUU]	Seo Do-ah		

=== Television shows ===
Year	Title	Role	Notes	Ref.
2015	Real Man	Cast member	Season 2, Female Edition 3 as Poison Spider Unit	
2019	King of Mask Singer	Contestant as "Star Candy"	Episode 223	
2021	Girls Planet 999	Contestant	Survival show that determined Kep1er members Finished 3rd	
2022	King of Mask Singer	Panelist	Episodes 347–348	

=== Music video appearances ===
Year	Artist/Band	Title	Ref.
2014	BtoB	"Beep Beep"	"Beep Beep" on YouTube
2014	G.NA	"Secret"	"Secret" on YouTube
2016	Johan Kim	"Y.O.U"	"Y.O.U" on YouTube
2026	Sorn	"Good Luck! "	"Good Luck!" on YouTube

=== Video games ===
Year	Title	Role	Ref.
2026	Locked in Love: The Office	Chaeeun	

== Awards and nominations ==
Name of the award ceremony, year presented, category, nominee of the award, and the result of the nomination
Award ceremony	Year	Category	Nominee / Work	Result	Ref.
Korea First Brand Awards 2025	2024	Female Acting Idol	Unknown Untitled Unmastered [UUU]	Nominated	
MBC Entertainment Awards	2015	Best Teamwork Award	Real Man Season 2 – Female Edition 3	Won	
