= Nu.Clear =

- From left to right: Sorn, Yeeun, Elkie, Eunbin, Yujin, Seungyeon and Seunghee

EP by CLC
- Released: May 30, 2016
- Recorded: 2016
- Genre: K-pop; dance-pop; new jack swing; rock
- Language: Korean
- Label: Cube; CJ E&M

CLC chronology
High Heels (2016)	Nu.Clear (2016)	Chamisma (2016)

Singles from Nu.Clear
- 1. "No Oh Oh" Released: May 30, 2016

Nu.Clear is the fourth Korean extended play (fifth overall) by South Korean girl group CLC. It was released digitally and physically on May 30, 2016 by Cube Entertainment, but the selling of physical copies of the album was pushed to June 3, 2016 to change song arrangements. The album contains six tracks, with member Jang Yeeun participating in three of the tracks for rap making. "No Oh Oh" was released as the lead single.

The name "Nu.Clear" represents the words "New" and "Clear" (which is taken from CLC's name, CrystaL Clear). It signifies CLC's music transformation as a complete 7-member group, with former Produce 101 contestant, Kwon Eun-bin, finally joining them with promotions.

== Background and release ==
On May 23, Cube Entertainment began uploading group and individual photo teasers for CLC's fourth mini-album Nu.Clear that was scheduled to be released on May 30. From the released images, CLC showed a funky and unique concept with the use of fancy neon colors, highlighting the "sly-dol" image. On May 26, CLC uploaded videos of I.O.I members and Jeon Soyeon (who were ex-Produce 101 trainees with Eunbin) showing support for CLC's comeback and Kwon Eunbin's official debut.

A music video for "No Oh Oh" was uploaded on May 30. The music video emphasizes vivid colors, as well as the members' visuals showing a sly image with various expressions. The members can also be seen posing on colorful backgrounds, highlighting their fruit characters. Seunghee with green apple, Yujin with strawberry, Seungyeon with orange, Sorn with watermelon, Yeeun with tomato, Elkie with cherry and lastly, Eunbin with lemon character.

The dance choreography for the performance of "No Oh Oh" is choreographed by Yama&Hotchick's Jun Hongbok and Bae Yoonjung. Bae Yoonjung was Kwon Eunbin's dance mentor on Produce 101.

== Composition ==
The lead single of the album, "No Oh Oh", was produced by the hit-composers Shinsadong Tiger and Beom & Nang. "No Oh Oh" is a dance number made of simple minor codes and sounds full of twists with a strongly addictive rich-sound chorus. It has a unique pop melody enhanced by main vocalist, Oh Seunghee. The lyrics portray the feeling of a shy girl falling in love.

The tracks "What Planet Are You From?" and "One, Two, Three" are in the new jack swing dance genre. "Day by Day" has a warm country rhythm, that expresses the bashful feeling of a girl falling in love. "Dear My Friend" is a medium-tempo pop song harmonized with acoustic guitar and synth sounds, sending warm and thankful messages to friends. "It's Too Late" is a ballad song, with the elements of rock music, about the story of a girl who sends a message to her loved one that she no longer cares for him.

== Promotion ==
A media showcase for the album was held on May 30 at the Lottecard Arts Center. The group performed the track "High Heels" from their previous album, Refresh, and also performed their new songs "No Oh Oh" and "One, Two, Three". The group also made their first music show performance on the 189th episode of MBC Music's Show Champion, performing both "No Oh Oh" and "One, Two, Three".

On June 17, member Eunbin was unable to attend a fansign event, and announced that she would be temporarily halting group promotions due to health issues. She rejoined the group on June 22, after recovering. The group ended their promotions on July 8, with the last performance on KBS's Music Bank.

== Track listing ==
No.	Title	Lyrics	Music	Arrangement	Length
1.	"What Planet Are You From?" (어느 별에서 왔니)	Son Youngjin, Jo Sungho, Jang Ye-eun (rap making)	Son Youngjin, Jo Sungho	Son Youngjin, Jo Sungho	3:10
2.	"No Oh Oh" (아니야)	Shinsadong Tiger, Beom & Nang, Jang Yeeun (uncredited)	Shinsadong Tiger, Beom & Nang	Shinsadong Tiger	3:43
3.	"One, Two, Three" (하나, 둘, 셋)	Seo EBum, Lee Sangchul, BPM	Seo EBum, Lee Sangchul, BPM	Seo EBum, Lee Sangchul, BPM	3:36
4.	"Day By Day"	Big Sancho, Son Youngjin, Ferdy, Jang Yeeun (rap making)	Big Sancho, Son Youngjin, Ferdy	Big Sancho, Son Youngjin, Ferdy	3:50
5.	"Dear My Friend"	Jo Sungho, Ferdy	Jo Sungho, Ferdy	Jo Sungho, Ferdy	3:26
6.	"It's Too Late" (진작에)	Ferdy, Jang Yeeun (rap making)	Ferdy	Ferdy	3:32
Total length:					21:17

== Charts ==
Chart (2016)	Peak position
South Korean Albums (Gaon)	16

== Release history ==
Country	Date	Format	Label
Various	May 30, 2016	Digital download	Cube Entertainment, CJ E&M Music
South Korea	May 30, 2016	Digital download	Cube Entertainment, CJ E&M Music
South Korea	June 3, 2016	CD	Cube Entertainment, CJ E&M Music
