= Gwiyomi Song =

Single by Hari
- Released: February 18, 2013
- Genre: Indie pop
- Length: 2:45
- Label: Dandi; Danal; Warner Music
- Songwriters: Dandi; Trot Master King
- Producer: Dandi

Hari singles chronology
"Hunnyeo BGM" (2012)	"Gwiyomi Song" (2013)	"Hari Baguette" (2013)

Lyric video
- "Gwiyomi Song" on YouTube

"Gwiyomi Song", "Kwiyomi Song" or " Kiyomi Song" (Korean: 귀요미 송; RR: Gwiyomi Song), originally titled "1 + 1 = Gwiyomi" (Korean: 1더하기1은 귀요미; RR: Il deohagi Ir-eun Gwiyomi), is a song recorded by South Korean singer Hari that was released on February 18, 2013. It was inspired by a gesture made by Choi Yujin while popularized by South Korean rapper Jung Ilhoon of boy group BtoB. The gesture is called 'Gwiyomi Player', which was popularized by South Korean variety show Weekly Idol through a segment called "The Aegyo Battle" (Battle of Cuteness) following Ilhoon's guest appearance on the show in October 2012. The song went on to be a viral success and an Internet meme after Korean Media outlet Sports Seoul uploaded a clip of Hari performing the gestures and singing the song. This video has since inspired many Asian netizens to upload their own versions onto the internet.

== Background ==
The internet meme originated from South Korean BtoB member Jung Ilhoon who made a series of cute hand movements or simply 'counting numbers in a cute way' called 'Gwiyomi Player' or 'Kwiyomi Player' ('Cutie Player' in English). He debuted the gestures during episode 24 of BtoB's reality TV show, MTV Diary, which aired in 2012. Ilhoon has long been credited with the creation of it, but he has never claimed to invent it himself – he had stated that a trainee in Cube Entertainment (later revealed to have been CLC's Choi Yu-jin) taught it to him.

The gesture became popular among various Korean entertainers after Ilhoon made an appearance on South Korean variety show Weekly Idol. The show then featured a mini segment dubbed "The Aegyo Battle" (Battle of Cuteness) where various idols performed different variations of the Gwiyomi gesture.

On February 18, 2013, a song called the "Gwiyomi Song" was released by South Korean singer Hari. The song was inspired by Jung Ilhoon's 'Gwiyeomi Player'. The song gained the attention of Jung Ilhoon himself, who uploaded a cover video on his music label Cube Entertainment's YouTube channel, performing the gestures while singing the song with his own version of lyrics. Singer Hari was then interviewed by Korean Media outlet Sports Seoul where she demonstrated the gestures while singing her song. The filmed clip was then uploaded online.

=== Etymology ===
According to The Bangkok Post, Gwiyomi or Kiyomi is Korean slang used to refer to a cute person. The lyrics of the song can be interpreted as "1 + 1 = Cutie, 2 + 2 = Cutie", etc.

Gwiyomi (귀요미) is based on the adjective-noun gwiyeop (귀엽), which is a root of gwieopda (귀엽다), means "cute". It then changed to gwiyeom (귀염) and to gwiyomi. Gwiyo captures the meaning of cuteness and ends an adjective with -mi (-미) has the effect of personifying the adjective, thereby turning the word into a noun. Thus gwiyomi means a "cute person".

== Viral spread ==
=== South Korea (2012) ===
After being featured on South Korean variety show Weekly Idol, other K-pop idols from popular bands such as Miss A, Girls' Generation, Infinite and SISTAR also exhibited the hand gestures and movements of the "Gwiyomi Player".

Following the song's release, Jung Ilhoon showed his appreciation by uploading a cover video on his music label, Cube Entertainment's YouTube channel, performing the gestures while singing the song with his own version of lyrics. After singer Hari was interviewed by Sport Seoul, a clip of herself making the gestures with the song was uploaded online. This video eventually went viral and has since inspired many South Koreans to upload their own version of it on the Internet. According to the K-pop website Soompi, many of these videos subsequently went viral on various Korean language websites.

=== Outside Korea (2013) ===
The "Gwiyomi Player" was mostly recreated by teenage girls from Southeast Asia, where the K-pop music genre has a huge and loyal fanbase especially in Thailand and in the Philippines. A few Thai actresses including Nuengthida Sophon also performed their own version of Gwiyomi. On March 26, The Bangkok Post described the "Gwiyomi" song as the latest web-viral sensation that has unseated "Gangnam Style" to become the new K-pop craze.

In early April 2013, the China Internet Information Center (a web portal operating under the auspices of the Chinese State Council Information Office) reported that large numbers of Chinese Internet users have uploaded their own version of the "Gwiyomi" song. On April 2, an article by a regional newspaper was republished by Xinhua News Agency (the official news agency of China), hailing "Gwiyomi" as the latest South Korean melody surpassing the popularity of "Gangnam Style".

The Gwiyomi phenomenon began trending in several other countries in the region, including Malaysia, Singapore, Hong Kong and Taiwan. The Japanese girl group x21 had a cover of this song on their album "Love Summer" released in 2014.
