= Hobgoblin (song) =

2017 single by CLC

Single by CLC

from the EP Crystyle
- Released: January 17, 2017
- Genre: K-pop; EDM; Trap
- Length: 3:30
- Label: Cube Entertainment; Kakao M
- Songwriter(s): Hyuna; Seo Jaewoo; Big Sancho; Son Youngjin
- Producer(s): Seo Jaewoo; Big Sancho; Son Yeongjin

CLC singles chronology
"Chamisma" (2016)	"Hobgoblin" (2017)	"Where Are You?" (2017)

Music video
- "도깨비 (Hobgoblin)" on YouTube

"Hobgoblin" (KR: 도깨비; RR: dokkaebi) is a song recorded by South Korean girl group CLC. It was released by Cube Entertainment and distributed by Kakao M on January 17, 2017, as the title track from their fifth extended play Crystyle (2017).

The song is credited as a turning point for the group with a darker and sexier image than they've showed in the past.

== Composition ==
The song was written by Hyuna, Seo Jaewoo, Big Sancho and Son Youngjin, and produced by the later three. It was also revealed that member Sorn contributed to the lyrics, but this remains uncredited.

Billboard described it as an EDM trap song and a sonic sequel to 4Minute's "Crazy", noting its "frenetic snares" and "dramatized raps".

== Release ==
The song was released in conjunction with the EP on January 17, 2017, through several music portals, including MelOn and iTunes.

== Commercial performance ==
The song peaked at number 4 on the US World Digital Singles chart, their first single to achieve it. The song is their best-selling song in the U.S. with 9,000 copies sold.

== Music video ==
The music video was also released on January 17. Singer Hyuna acted as a creative director for the music video and helped orchestrate the choreography for the song.

== Charts ==
Chart (2017)	Peak position
US World Digital Songs (Billboard)	4
