= Hari (singer) =

South Korean singer

Hari 하리
- Born: Jeong Sung-kyung (정성경); February 6, 1990 (age 36)
- Origin: South Korea
- Genres: K-pop, dance
- Years active: 2010–present
- Label: Dandi Recordz

Jeong Sung-kyung (born February 6, 1990), also known by her stage name Hari, is a South Korean singer. She rose to prominence after her single, "Gwiyomi", became internet phenomenon in early 2013. She is signed under Dandi Recordz.

== Filmography ==
=== Television ===
Year	Title	Role	Notes	Country
2013	It's Showtime	Herself	Guest; September 2, 2013	Philippines
2013	Yuk Keep Smile	Herself	Guest; November 8, 2013	Indonesia
2013	The Comment	Herself	Guest; November, 2013	Indonesia

== Discography ==
=== Singles ===
List of singles
Year	Title	Notes
2010	Fan Cake (팬케잌)	Digital single
2012	조으다 완전 조으다	
2012	훈녀 BGM	
2013	Gwiyomi (1더하기1은 귀요미)	Digital single
2013	Gwiyomi (귀요미송)	Retitle of the single
2013	Break In (하리바게뜨)	Digital single
2013	Hari Baguette (하리바게뜨)	
2013	Hangul Song (한글송)	
2014	Bad Boy (나쁜놈아)	Digital single
2014	Gwiyomi Song 2 (귀요미송 2)	
