= High Heels (CLC EP) =

EP by CLC
- Released: April 13, 2016
- Recorded: 2016
- Genre: Dance-pop
- Language: Japanese
- Label: Cube (Japan)

CLC chronology
Refresh (2016)	High Heels (2016)	Nu.Clear (2016)

Singles from High Heels
- 1. "High Heels" Released: April 13, 2016

High Heels is the debut Japanese extended play (fourth overall) by the South Korean girl group CLC. It was released on April 13, 2016 by Cube Entertainment (Japan). "High Heels" was released as the lead single.

== Background and promotion ==
On March 4, Cube Entertainment announced that CLC will be making their Japanese debut on April 13, starting with their overseas promotion. The mini-album includes the Japanese versions of previously released songs, "Pepe", "Curious", "First Love" and their promotional single "High Heels". The album also includes an exclusive cover of Kylie Minogue's song, "I Should Be So Lucky". The group held their 1st Japanese showcase with only 6-members as member Eunbin (former Produce 101 contestant) was reported to be not participating in the group's Japanese promotions.

== Editions ==
The mini-album is available in two different editions, including: Type A (CD) and Type B (CD+DVD) version.

== Track listing ==
Type A CD
No.	Title	Length
1.	"First Love" (ファーストラブ)	3:41
2.	"Pepe"	3:18
3.	"Curious" (クングメ)	3:45
4.	"High Heels"	3:25
5.	"I Should Be So Lucky"	3:32
Total length:		17:41

Type B CD+DVD
No.	Title	Length
1.	"First Love" (ファーストラブ)	3:41
2.	"Pepe"	3:17
3.	"Curious" (クングメ)	3:45
4.	"High Heels"	3:24
5.	"I Should Be So Lucky"	3:32
6.	"Pepe" (Music Video; Korean Version)	3:30
7.	"Curious" (Music Video; Korean Version)	3:54
8.	"High Heels" (Music Video; Korean Version)	3:47
9.	"High Heels" (Music Video; Japanese Version)	3:47

== Charts ==
Chart (2016)	Peak position
Japanese Albums (Oricon)	23
