= Crystyle =

- Digital cover and realistic version

EP by CLC
- Released: January 17, 2017
- Recorded: 2016
- Venue: Seoul, South Korea
- Studio: Cube Studio
- Genre: EDM; trap; dance-pop
- Language: Korean
- Label: Cube; CJ E&M

CLC chronology
Chamisma (2016)	Crystyle (2017)	Free'sm (2017)

Singles from Crystyle
- 1. "Hobgoblin" Released: January 17, 2017

Crystyle is the fifth Korean extended play (seventh overall) recorded by South Korean girl group CLC. It was released on January 17, 2017, by Cube Entertainment and distributed by CJ E&M. "Hobgoblin" was released as the lead single. To promote the EP, the group performed on several South Korean music programs, including Music Bank and Inkigayo. A music video for the title track, was also released on January 17.

The EP was a peaking at number 10 on Gaon Album Chart and at number 6 on US World Albums. The album has sold 5,769 physical copies as of February 2017.

== Background and release ==
On December 27, 2016, CLC confirmed that they would be releasing a new album in January, with a different concept from the group's existing image. It was also stated that their new album aimed to show a more charismatic, hip-hop and chic image. On January 4, 2017, CLC released the album art for their fifth extended play titled Crystyle which would be released on January 17, 2017. On January 10, CLC released a "Goblin"-concept photo.

== Single ==
The album's title track "Hobgoblin" is an EDM trap song written by Hyuna, Seo Jaewoo, Big Sancho and Son Youngjin, people who had previously worked the 4Minute song "Crazy". The song and its music video were released simultaneously with the album.

== Commercial performance ==
Crystyle entered at number 10 on the Gaon Album Chart on the chart issue dated January 15–21, 2017. In its second week, the EP fell to number 40. In its third week, the EP climbed to number 28, dropping the chart the following week.

The EP sold 3,975 physical copies, placing at number 30 on the Gaon Album Chart for the month of January 2017.

In the US, the mini-album entered and peaked at number 6 on Billboard's World Albums on the week ending February 4, 2017. In its second week, the EP fell to number 10.

== Track listing ==
No.	Title	Lyrics	Music	Arrangement	Length
1.	"Liar"	Big Sancho; Yorkie	Devine Channel; Holiday	Devine Channel; Holiday	3:17
2.	"Hobgoblin" (도깨비; Dokkaebi)	Hyuna; Seo Jaewoo; Big Sancho; Son Youngjin; Chonnasorn Sajakul	Seo Jaewoo; Big Sancho; Son Yeongjin	Seo Jaewoo; Big Sancho; Son Yeongjin	3:30
3.	"Mistake"	Big Sancho; Ferdy; Jang Ye-eun	Big Sancho; Ferdy; Devine Channel	Big Sancho; Ferdy	3:08
4.	"Meow Meow" (미유미유)	Son Youngjin; Jo Sungho	Son Youngjin; Jo Sungho; Geoff Earley; Devine Channel	Son Youngjin; Geoff Earley	3:18
5.	"I Mean That" (말이야; Malliya)	Son Youngjin; Kang Dongha; Jang Yeeun	Son Youngjin; Kang Dongha	Son Youngjin; Kang Dongha	3:14
6.	"Depression" (눈물병; Nunmulbyeong)	Son Youngjin; Jo Sungho	Son Youngjin; Jo Sungho	Son Youngjin; Jo Sungho	3:27
Total length:					19:54

== Charts ==
=== Weekly charts ===
Chart (2017)	Peak position
South Korea (Gaon Album Chart)	10
United States (World Albums Chart)	6

=== Monthly charts ===
Chart (2017)	Peak position
South Korea (Gaon Album Chart)	30

== Release history ==
Region	Date	Format	Label
Various	January 17, 2017	Digital download	Cube Entertainment; CJ E&M
South Korea	January 17, 2017	Digital download; CD	Cube Entertainment; CJ E&M
