= Question (EP) =

- From left to right: Sorn, Seunghee, Yeeun, Yujin and Seungyeon.

EP by CLC
- Released: May 28, 2015
- Recorded: 2015
- Genre: K-pop; dance-pop
- Language: Korean
- Label: Cube; CJ E&M

CLC chronology
First Love (2015)	Question (2015)	Refresh (2016)

Singles from Question
- 1. "Like" Released: May 28, 2015

Question is the second extended play by South Korean girl group CLC. It was released on May 28, 2015. "Like" was released as the lead single.

This is the last EP before additional of the new members, Elkie and Eunbin prior to the release of Refresh.

== Background ==
Rookie girl group CLC, made their first comeback with the release of their second mini-album Question. The album and music video for their promotional single "Curious (Like)" was released on May 28. The track is composed by songwriters Seo Jaewoo, Big Sancho and Son Youngjin, and is centered around the young hearts of a one-sided love.

== Track listing ==
No.	Title	Lyrics	Music	Arrangement	Length
1.	"Hey-Yo"	Big Sancho, FERDY, Lee Brian D	Big Sancho, FERDY	Big Sancho, FERDY	3:34
2.	"Curious (Like)" (궁금해)	Big Sancho, Seo Jaewoo, Son Youngjin	Big Sancho, Seo Jaewoo, Son Youngjin	Big Sancho, Seo Jaewoo, Son Youngjin	3:45
3.	"Lucky"	Duble Sidekick, Seion, David Kim	Duble Sidekick, Seion	영광의 얼굴들	3:09
4.	"Hide and Seek" (숨바꼭질)	Jung Il-hoon	Jo Sung-ho, FERDY	Jo Sung-ho, FERDY	3:20
5.	"What Should I Do" (어쩌죠)	Big Ssancho, Son Youngjin	Son Youngjin	Son Youngjin	3:48
Total length:					17:36

== Charts ==
Chart (2015)	Peak position
South Korean Albums (Gaon)	9

== Release history ==
Country	Date	Distributing label	Format
South Korea	May 28, 2015	Cube Entertainment; CJ E&M Music	CD, Digital download
