= Chamisma =

EP by CLC
- Released: July 27, 2016
- Recorded: 2016
- Genre: J-pop
- Language: Japanese
- Label: Cube (Japan)

CLC chronology
Nu.Clear (2016)	Chamisma (2016)	Crystyle (2017)

Singles from Chamisma
- 1. "Chamisma" Released: July 27, 2016

Chamisma is the second and final Japanese extended play (sixth overall) by the South Korean girl group CLC. It was released on July 27, 2016 by Cube Entertainment (Japan). "Chamisma" was released as the lead single.

== Background and release ==
On June 16, Cube Entertainment announced that CLC will be returning to Japan to release their 2nd Japanese mini-album, "Charmisma". The word "Charmisma" is a combination of the words "Charming" and "Smile". It is also the group's first original Japanese track, which shows the lovely charms of the 7 members of the group, including Kwon Eunbin who will be joining them in Japanese promotions for the first time.

The album will be released in 3 different versions: Type A (CD), Type B (CD+DVD) and Type C (CD+DVD). The Type B version of the album includes a track and music video of Chamisma featuring Jung Il-hoon of BTOB while the Type C version includes a DVD of CLC's first Japanese showcase "First Step".

== Track listing ==
Type A (CD)
No.	Title	Length
1.	"Chamisma" (チャミスマ)	3:19
2.	"Sukidoki" (スキドキ)	3:00
3.	"Chocolate Spice"	3:28
4.	"1,2,3" (Japanese Version)	3:36
5.	"Gakuen Tengoku" (学園天国)	2:37

Type B (CD+DVD)
No.	Title	Length
1.	"Chamisma" (チャミスマ)	3:19
2.	"スキドキ"	3:00
3.	"Chocolate Spice"	3:28
4.	"1,2,3" (Original Version)	3:36
5.	"学園天国"	2:37
6.	"Chamisma" (feat. Jung Il-hoon of BTOB)	3:19
7.	"Chamisma MV"
8.	"Chamisma MV" (feat. Jung Il-hoon of BTOB)

Type C (CD+DVD)
No.	Title	Length
1.	"Chamisma" (チャミスマ)	3:19
2.	"スキドキ"	3:00
3.	"Chocolate Spice"	3:28
4.	"1,2,3" (Original Version)	2:37
5.	"学園天国"	2:37
6.	"CLC 1st Showcase in Japan "First Step""

== Charts ==
Chart (2016)	Peak position
Japanese Albums (Oricon)	16
