= No.1 (EP) =

2019 mini-album by South Korean girl group CLC

- From left to right (top): Seunghee, Eunbin, Elkie & Sorn/From left to right (bottom): Yujin, Yeeun and Seungyeon./Digital cover and stylised edition.

EP by CLC
- Released: January 30, 2019
- Recorded: 2018
- Genres: K-pop; synth-pop; trap; R&B
- Length: 16:22
- Labels: Cube; Kakao M

CLC chronology
Black Dress (2018)	No.1 (2019)

Singles from No.1
- 1. "No" Released: January 30, 2019

No.1 (Note: pronounced as "no one") is the eighth and most recent Korean extended play (tenth overall) by South Korean girl group CLC. It was released digitally on January 30, 2019, and physically on January 31, by Cube Entertainment and distributed by Kakao M. It features five tracks, including the lead single "No".

== Background and release ==
After revealing a comeback schedule, it was reported on January 17, 2019 that the group would be releasing No.1, their eighth extended play recording.

The EP was released through several music portals on January 30, 2019, including MelOn, iTunes and Spotify.

== Promotion ==
Prior to announcing the group's comeback, Cube Entertainment placed an advertisement at the intersection of subway line 2 - Samseong station, Seongsu station - Ttukseom station and Seoul Forest station - Seongdong Gu Bridge intersection.

On January 20, 2019, it was confirmed that CLC would guest on Weekly Idol, the group's first variety show for their comeback with No.1, marking their first appearance on the program as a group of seven. Cube Entertainment released individual and group photos on January 20 and 21, respectively, followed by the track list on January 22 and audio snippets on January 23. Individual and MV teasers were released from January 24–28.

On January 30, CLC held a press conference before the album release at the Blue Square iMarket Hall. The same day, a premiere showcase hosted by Mnet was broadcast through Naver and Mnet-M2. CLC is the first girl group to have their own show, after BTS, Wanna One and Got7. They performed lead single "No" and several other songs from the EP as well as tracks from Black Dress. The group also appeared as guests on Idol Radio to promote the album.

== Music video ==
The music video was released alongside the EP on January 30. Within 24 hours, the video had surpassed 2.2 million views on YouTube.

On 14 February "No" music video surpassed 10 million combined views for the official music video uploaded on 1theK's channel and CLC's official channel. As of June 2019 music video has over 21 million views combined on both channels.

== Track listing ==
No.	Title	Lyrics	Music	Arrangement	Length
1.	"No"	So-yeon; Jang Ye-eun	So-yeon; June	So-yeon; June	3:01
2.	"Show"	Dally; Seo Jae-woo (TENTEN); BreadBeat (TENTEN); June; Ye-eun	Seo Jae-woo (TENTEN); BreadBeat (TENTEN); June	Seo Jae-woo (TENTEN); BreadBeat (TENTEN); June	3:31
3.	"Breakdown"	Choi Young-kyung; Ye-eun	Simon Petren; Choi Young-kyung; 추대관 (MonoTree)	Simon Petren	3:11
4.	"Like It"	Kim Yeon-seo; The Proof; Ye-eun	The Proof; Kim Yeon-seo	The Proof	3:13
5.	"I Need U"	Anna Timgren; VINCENZO; Fuxxy; Any Masingga; Ye-eun	VINCENZO; Fuxxy; Any Masingga; Anna Timgren	VINCENZO; Fuxxy	3:26
Total length:					16:22

== Charts ==
=== Album ===
==== Weekly charts ====
Chart (2019)	Peak position
South Korean Albums (Gaon)	4
US Billboard Heatseekers Albums	19
US Billboard Independent Albums	49
US Billboard World Albums	5

=== Single ===
==== "No" Weekly charts ====
Chart (2019)	Peak position
US World Digital Songs (Billboard)	4

== Accolades ==
Year-end lists
Critic/Publication	List	Song	Rank	Ref.
Billboard	The 25 Best K-pop Songs of 2019: Critics' Picks	"No"	11	
BuzzFeed	30 Songs That Helped Define K-Pop in 2019	"No"	30	
Dazed	The 20 best K-pop songs of 2019	"No"	16	
Refinery29	The Best K-Pop Songs Of 2019	"No"	25	
SBS	Top 100 Asian pop songs of 2019	"No"	24	

=== Music program awards ===
Song	Program	Date	Ref.
"No"	The Show	February 12, 2019	
"No"	The Show	February 19, 2019	

== Release history ==
Region	Date	Format	Label
Various	January 30, 2019	Digital download	Cube Entertainment, Kakao M
South Korea	January 31, 2019	CD	Cube Entertainment, Kakao M
