= Elkie Chong =

Hong Kong singer and actress (born 1998)

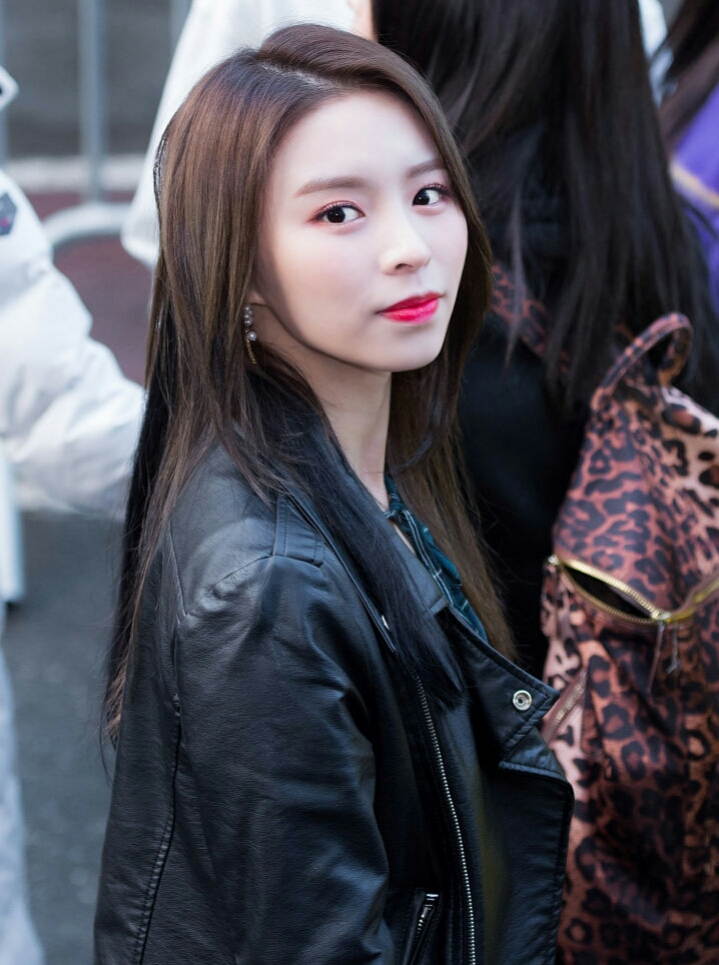
- Chong in February 2018
- Born: Chong Ting-yan; 2 November 1998 (age 27); Tai Po, Hong Kong
- Other name: Elkie
- Occupations: Singer; actress
- Years active: 2009–present
- Musical career
- Genres: K-pop
- Instrument: Vocals
- Label: Cube
- Member of: CLC
- Formerly of: Honey Bees; United Cube

Chinese name
- Traditional Chinese: 莊錠欣
- Simplified Chinese: 庄锭欣
- Hanyu Pinyin: Zhuāng Dìngxīn
- Yale Romanization: Jōng Ding-yān
- Jyutping: Zong1 Ding3-jan1

Korean stage name
- Hangul: 엘키
- RR: Elki
- MR: Elk'i

Chong Ting-yan (Chinese: 莊錠欣; born 2 November 1998), known professionally as Elkie Chong, is a Hong Kong singer and actress, previously based in South Korea and now based in Taiwan. She was previously a child-actress under in Hong Kong’s TVB and has appeared on several television dramas. Under Cube Entertainment, she debuted as a member of the South Korean girl group CLC in February 2016. Following her request to terminate her contract with Cube in December 2020, Elkie left both Cube and CLC in February 2021.

== Early life ==
Chong was born on 2 November 1998 in Hong Kong. She attended Carmel Pak U Secondary School.

== Career ==
=== 2009–2015: Early career ===
Chong was a popular teenage star in Hong Kong, being a former member of the Hong Kong project girl-group Honey Bees, and also a child-actress under TVB who acted in almost 20 dramas.

=== 2016–2019: Debut with CLC and solo activities ===
In February 2016, Chong was introduced as a new member of the South Korean girl-group CLC together with Kwon Eun-bin. She officially made her Korean debut on 29 February with the release of CLC's third EP, Refresh, and made her first public appearance with the group on the 463rd episode of Mnet's M Countdown performing "High Heels".

Chong was announced to make her K-drama debut in March 2018, in the weekend drama Rich Family's Son as Mong Mong, a Chinese foreign exchange student.

Chong made her solo debut with digital single "I Dream" on 23 November 2018.

In 2019, Chong was cast in a recurring role in Chinese drama A Little Thing Called First Love as Yang Man Ling, a senior who is responsible for a radio station.

=== 2020–present: Request for contract termination ===
In December 2020, Chong requested that her exclusive contract with Cube Entertainment be terminated on the grounds that the company violated the contract. She claimed that she had not been paid for her acting activities, and that Cube Entertainment had already stopped their "developmental support" of CLC.

On 3 February 2021, Cube Entertainment confirmed Chong's departure from CLC, and her contract with the company has been terminated. Chong currently resides and is pursuing a career in mainland China, although she maintains a good relationship with her former CLC members. In June 2021, Chong collaborated with T.U.B.S member Ji Li for the song "Gave My Heart Away".

== Discography ==
=== Singles ===
Title	Year	Peak position		Sales	Album
Title	Year	KOR Gaon	US World	Sales	Album
As lead artist
"I Dream"	2018	—	—	—N/a	Non-album singles
"Speed Up"	2023	—	—	—N/a	Non-album singles
Collaborations
"Gave My Heart Away" (with Ji Li)	2021	—	—	—N/a	Non-album single
Soundtrack appearances
"After the Play is Over" (with Lee Chang-sub, Huta)	2016	—	—	—N/a	After the Play Ends OST
"—" denotes songs that did not chart or were not released in that region.

=== Songwriting credits ===
All credits are adapted from the Korea Music Copyright Association, unless stated otherwise.

Song	Year	Lyrics		Music	
Song	Year	Credited	With	Credited	With
"I Dream"	2018	Yes	—N/a	Yes	Becky

== Videography ==
=== Music videos ===
Title	Year	Director(s)	Ref.
"Speed Up"	2023	Hsuan Wu; Su Zan	

== Filmography ==
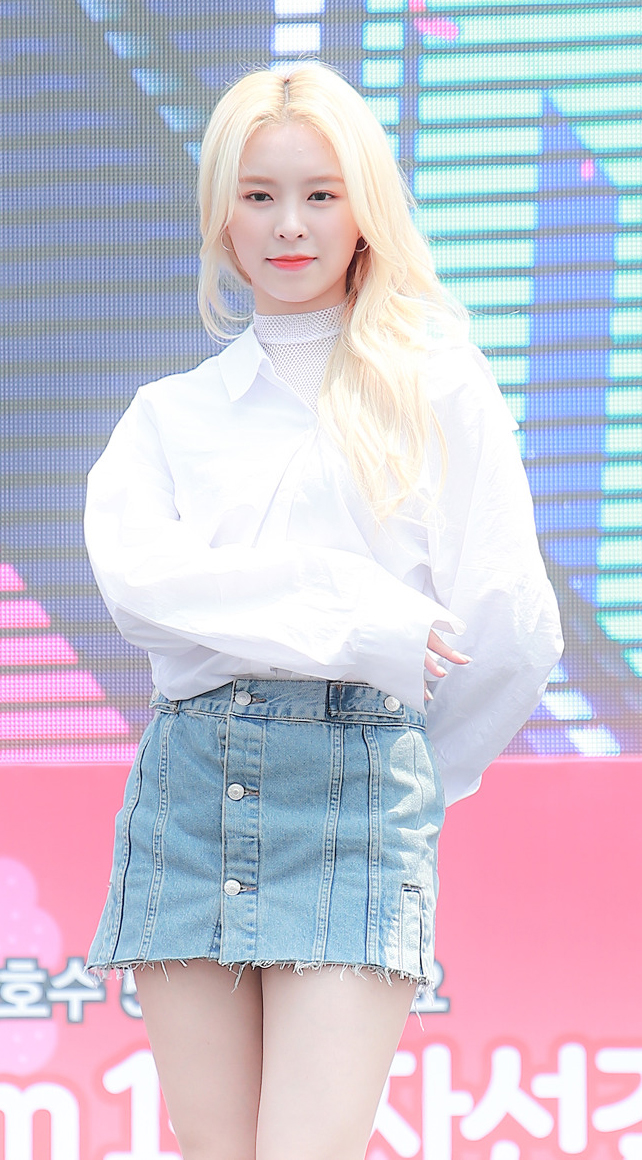
Chong in 2017

=== Television series ===
Year	Title	Network	Role
2009	Born Rich	TVB	Kiki
2010	The Comeback Clan	TVB	Kay (young)
2010	Suspects in Love	TVB	Cheng Siu Man (young)
2010	Can't Buy Me Love	TVB	Kim Kiki
2010	No Regrets	TVB	Chan Mei Ting (young)
2011	My Sister of Eternal Flower	TVB	
2011	Ghetto Justice	TVB	
2011	Men with No Shadows	TVB	Toi Yan (young)
2012	Three Kingdoms RPG	TVB	
2012	Highs and Lows	TVB	Fong Teen Wai (young)
2012	Friendly Fire	TVB	Luk Yau Yee
2012	Queens of Diamonds and Hearts	TVB	
2012	Tiger Cubs	TVB	Grace
2013	A Change of Heart	TVB	Tong Sin Hang (young)
2013	A Great Way to Care ll	TVB	
2013	Sniper Standoff	TVB	Wong Yeuk Ling (young)
2013	The Hippocratic Crush II	TVB	Yannis Suen
2014	Come Home Love	TVB	Lovely Ling Lei (young)
2014	Storm in a Cocoon	TVB	Poon Hau Yee (teen)
2014	Come On, Cousin	TVB	Cai Jing Man (young)
2014	Tomorrow Is Another Day	TVB	Chung Yee Sum
2014	Officer Geomancer	TVB	Shek Kiu (young)
2015	The Menu	HKTV	Mallory Mak (young)
2015	Wudang Rules	TVB	Wu Sei Mui
2015	Smooth Talker	TVB	Lam Ah Lui (young)
2015	Captain of Destiny	TVB	Wong Tai Nui (young)
2015	Elite Brigade III	RTHK	Lee Ching
2016	Love as a Predatory Affair	TVB	High School Student
2016	Fashion War	TVB	Student
2018	Rich Family's Son	MBC	Wang Mong-mong
2019	A Little Thing Called First Love	Hunan TV	Yang Man Ling
