= Free'sm =

- From left to right: Seunghee, Elkie, Yeeun, Yujin, Seungyeon, Sorn and Eunbin/Digital version and colormatic version stylised as colours and standard edition.

EP by CLC
- Released: August 3, 2017
- Genre: K-pop; R&B; City pop; New jack swing; Future house
- Length: 21:16
- Label: Cube; CJ E&M

CLC chronology
Crystyle (2017)	Free'sm (2017)	Black Dress (2018)

Singles from Free'sm
- 1. "Where are You?" Released: August 3, 2017; 2. "Summer Kiss" Released: August 27, 2017; 3. "I Like It" Released: September 29, 2017

Free'sm is the sixth Korean extended play (eighth overall) by South Korean girl group CLC. It was released on August 3, 2017, by Cube Entertainment and distributed by CJ E&M Music. The EP consists of six songs. "Where are You?" was released as the title track and it was promoted for their first week of promotions followed by "Summer Kiss" on several South Korean music programs, including Music Bank and Inkigayo.

The EP debuted at number 10 on the Gaon Album Chart.

== Background and release ==
On July 24, 2017, the first video teaser was released featuring Cube Entertainment trainee and former Produce 101 Season 2 contestant, Yoo Seonho. The clip shows Seonho in a bedroom searching and finding an old VHS tape labelled "1982.3.8" with "Where are You?" instrumental as background music. Two days later, the second and final video teaser was released. The clip shows Seonho playing the VHS tape found. The group is watched through a retro-style television set, the footage shown came from their album photo shoot. On July 30, an audio snippet video was released, showing a preview of each song.

The EP was released on August 3, 2017, through several music portals, including MelOn in South Korea, and iTunes for the global market.

== Promotion ==
=== Singles ===
"Where are You?" was released as the title track in conjunction with the EP release on August 3. A music video teaser was released on August 1, with the full music video being released on August 3. The song was used to promote the EP on music programs for two weeks, starting on M Countdown on August 3 and ending on Inkigayo on August 13.

"Summer Kiss" promotion followed "Where Are You?" promotions for another fortnight, starting on MBC Music's Show Champion on August 16. A choreography practice video was released on August 20. The group ended the promotions on August 27 on Inkigayo, after two weeks of promotions.

The group started performing "I Like It" at events starting from September 29. A performance video was later released on October 26.

=== Live performances ===
The group held their first comeback stage on Mnet's M Countdown on August 3, 2017, performing the title track "Where are You?". They continued on KBS's Music Bank on August 4, MBC's Show! Music Core on August 5 and SBS's Inkigayo on August 6. From August 16 onward, CLC began performing the song "Summer Kiss" a week earlier than planned, thus shortening promotions for "Where Are You?" by a week and lengthening "Summer Kiss" promotions by a week. Many fans had concluded that this was due to a demand for a song more suited for the summer season.

== Commercial performance ==
Free'sm debuted at number 10 on the Gaon Album Chart, on the chart issue dated July 30 - August 5, 2017. The EP placed at number 41 on the chart for the month of August 2017, with 4,355 physical copies sold.

== Track listing ==
Digital download
No.	Title	Lyrics	Music	Arrangement	Length
1.	"Where are You?" (어디야?; eodiya?)	Armadillo	Armadillo	Armadillo; Dani; Gu Seongcheol	3:40
2.	"Bae"	Big Sancho; Park Haeil; Jang Yeeun	Big Sancho; Park Haeil	Big Sancho; Park Haeil	3:33
3.	"I Like It" (즐겨; jeulgyeo)	Seo Jaewoo; Big Sancho; Jang Ye-eun	Seo Jaewoo; Big Sancho; Nick Holiday; Nikki Paige	Seo Jaewoo; Big Sancho; Nick Holiday	3:32
4.	"Call My Name"	Shin Agnes (MonoTree)	Chu Daegwan (MonoTree); Nopari	Nopari	3:04
5.	"Summer Kiss"	Sweetch; Jerry.L	Sweetch; Jerry.L	Sweetch; Torry K	3:27
6.	"Hold Your Hand" (잡아줄게; jab-ajulge)	Son Youngjin; Kang Dongha; Jang Yeeun	Son Youngjin; Kang Dongha	Son Youngjin; Kang Dongha	4:00
Total length:					21:16

== Charts ==
Chart (2017)	Peak position
South Korean Albums (Gaon)	10
US World Albums (Billboard)	14
