= Black Dress (EP) =

- Digital edition

EP by CLC
- Released: February 22, 2018
- Genres: K-pop; EDM; hip hop
- Length: 16:38
- Labels: Cube; LOEN
- Producers: Cho Sung-ho; Ferdy; Kang Dong-Ha; NOPARI; MonoTree; Harry Potter; Seo Jae-woo

CLC chronology
| Free'sm (2017) | Black Dress (2018) | No.1 (2019) |

Singles from Black Dress
- 1. "To the Sky" Released: February 1, 2018; 2. "Black Dress" Released: February 22, 2018; 3. "Distance" Released: April 3, 2018

Black Dress is the seventh Korean extended play (ninth overall) by South Korean girl group CLC. It was released on February 22, 2018, by Cube Entertainment and distributed by LOEN Entertainment. It consists of five songs, including the previously released song "To the Sky" and the title track "Black Dress".

The EP peaked at number 7 on the US World Albums chart and at number 12 on the Gaon Album Chart.

== Background and release ==
On February 6, 2018, an image teaser was released online, revealing that the group will be releasing their seventh EP, Black Dress, on February 22. Two days later, a comeback schedule was released, revealing that starting February 12, the group will release image and video teasers ahead of an online release on February 22, and a physical release a day later. On February 12, the agency stated that their upcoming EP "will show off its charm and maturity by focusing on a chic and charismatic performance with a hip-hop, EDM and dance-based composition". A day later, behind the scene photos were revealed.

On February 14, the pre-order for the album was opened for online and offline music sites, revealing that the EP will contain a booklet of 146 pages, a post card, a photo card and a poster of the group. It was also revealed that a postcard and stamp sticker set will be available for those who buy the album on 20SPACE. On February 18, the full track list was release, revealing the title track as "Black Dress". On February 19, an audio snippet for each song was released on the group's official YouTube channel.

The EP was released on February 22, 2018, through several music portals, including MelOn in South Korea and iTunes for the global market.

== Promotion ==
=== Singles ===
"To the Sky" was released as a digital pre-release track on February 1, 2018. On February 9, a choreography practice video was released for the song.

"Black Dress" was released as the title track in conjunction with the EP on February 22, alongside its music video. The song expresses the woman's mind to seduce the other person with a fashion item called black dress. The music video for the song is directed by Kim Ji-hoon. On February 20, the first music video teaser was released through the group's official YouTube channel and their distributor channel, 1theK.

=== Live performances ===
Music show promotions commenced on February 22, on Mnet's, M Countdown, performing the title song, "Black Dress".

== Commercial performance ==
Black Dress debuted at number 11 on Billboard's World Albums Chart, on the week ending March 3, 2018. It also debuted at number 12 on the Gaon Album Chart, on the chart issue dated February 18–24, 2018.

The album placed at number 35 for the month of February 2018, with 4,671 physical copies sold.

== Track listing ==
Digital download
| No. | Title | Lyrics | Music | Arrangement | Length |
|---|---|---|---|---|---|
| 1. | "Black Dress" | Cho Sung-ho; Ferdy; Kang Dong-Ha; Jang Ye-eun | Cho Sung-ho; Ferdy; Kang Dong-Ha | Cho Sung-ho; Ferdy; Kang Dong-Ha | 3:13 |
| 2. | "Like That" | Jaeri Potter; Jang Ye-eun; Kwon Eun-bin | NOPARI; MonoTree; Jaeri Potter | MonoTree; NOPARI | 2:59 |
| 3. | "Distance" (선; seon) | Seo Jae-woo; Cho Sung-ho; Jang Ye-eun | Seo Jae-woo; Cho Sung-ho | Seo Jae-woo; Cho Sung-ho | 3:07 |
| 4. | "To the Sky" | Cho Sung-ho; Ferdy; Jang Ye-eun | Cho Sung-ho; Ferdy | Cho Sung-ho; Ferdy | 3:05 |
| 5. | "7th" (일곱번째; ilgob beonjjae) | Cho Sung-ho; Kang Dong-Ha; Jang Ye-eun | Cho Sung-ho; Kang Dong-Ha | Cho Sung-ho; Kang Dong-Ha | 4:11 |
| Total length: | | | | | 16:38 |

== Charts ==
| Chart (2018) | Peak position |
|---|---|
| South Korean Albums (Gaon) | 12 |
| US World Albums (Billboard) | 7 |

== Release history ==
| Region | Date | Format | Label |
|---|---|---|---|
| South Korea | February 22, 2018 | Digital download | Cube Entertainment |
| Various | February 22, 2018 | Digital download | Cube Entertainment |
| South Korea | February 23, 2018 | CD | Cube Entertainment |
