= CLC (group) =

South Korean girl group

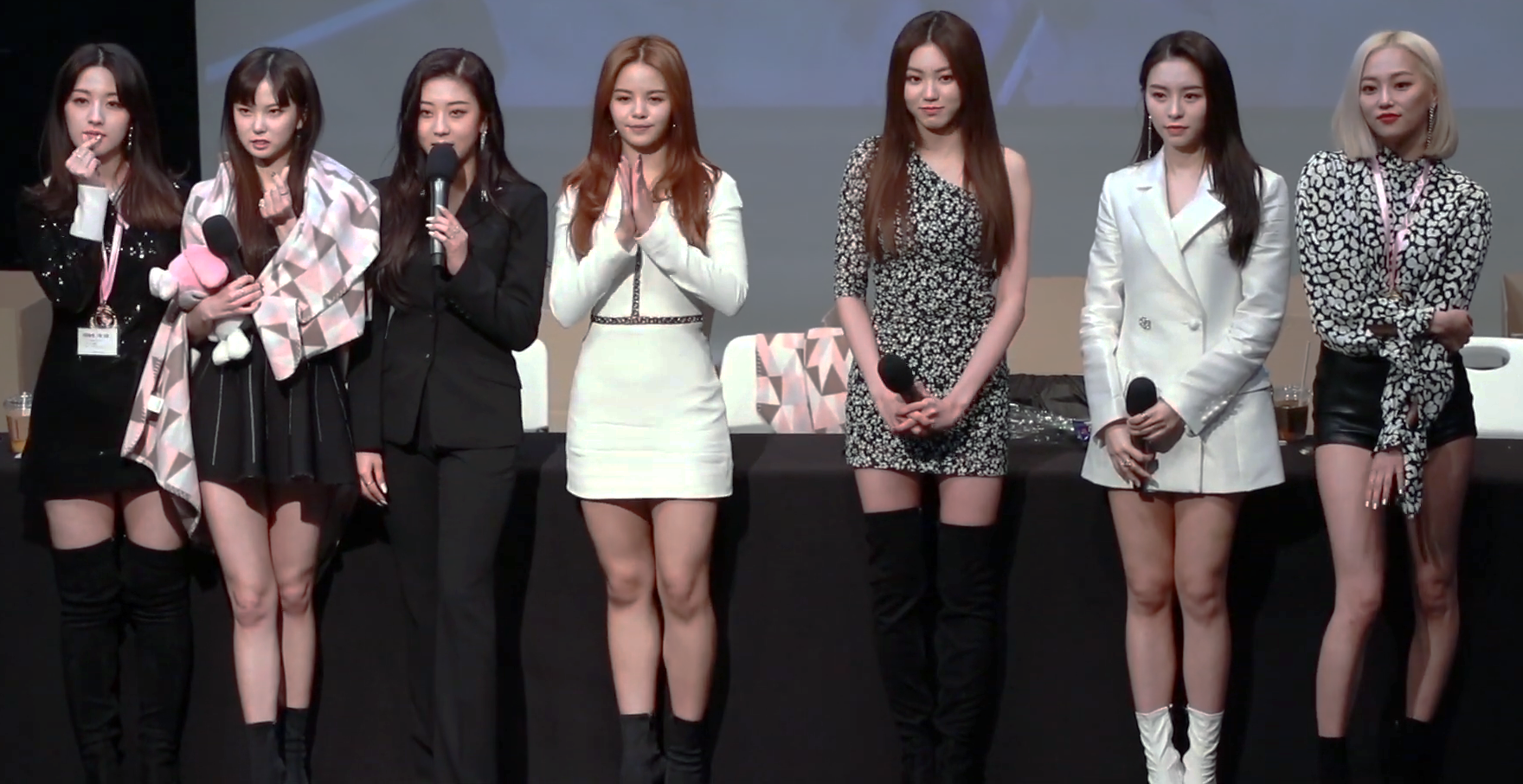
- CLC at a fan event in Seoul, February 2019; From left to right: Seunghee, Yujin, Seungyeon, Sorn, Eunbin, Elkie, and Yeeun

Background information
- Origin: Seoul, South Korea
- Genres: K-pop; EDM; trap; synth-pop; R&B
- Years active: 2015–2021; 2026
- Labels: Cube; Universal Japan
- Members: Seunghee; Yujin; Seungyeon; Sorn; Elkie; Yeeun
- Past members: Eunbin
- Website: cubeent.co.kr/clc

CLC (Korean: 씨엘씨, an initialism for CrystaL Clear) is a South Korean girl group formed by Cube Entertainment. Their debut EP First Love was released on March 19, 2015, with five group members: Seunghee, Yujin, Seungyeon, Sorn, and Yeeun. The remaining two members, Elkie and Eunbin, were added to the group with the release of their third EP, Refresh, on February 29, 2016. Throughout their career, CLC's musical identity was known to be diverse such as EDM trap and hip-hop songs.

From 2020 onward, Cube halted CLC promotions and the members have embarked on individual music, acting, and modeling careers. On May 20, 2022, after being inactive for over a year and a half, Cube Entertainment announced that their "official activities" had ended, with their CLC U Cube global fansite service discontinued on June 6. In 2023, Sorn revealed that all members had gradually gone their separate ways, however, the group has not disbanded.

All members have since individually left Cube Entertainment, pursuing solo projects and occasional collaborations between members, while regularly reuniting for anniversaries. CLC eventually reunited for their tenth anniversary in 2026.

== History ==
=== Pre-debut ===
The five original members of CLC (Seunghee, Yujin, Seungyeon, Sorn, and Yeeun) made their first appearance as back-up dancers for G.NA in 2014. They also modeled for the uniform brand Smart, featuring in a promotional music video with the boy groups Got7 and B1A4. Before their official debut, the group began to gain publicity through street performances they held to raise money for children with disabilities. These featured on their web reality show, CLC's Love Chemistry.

=== 2015: Debut and further EP releases ===
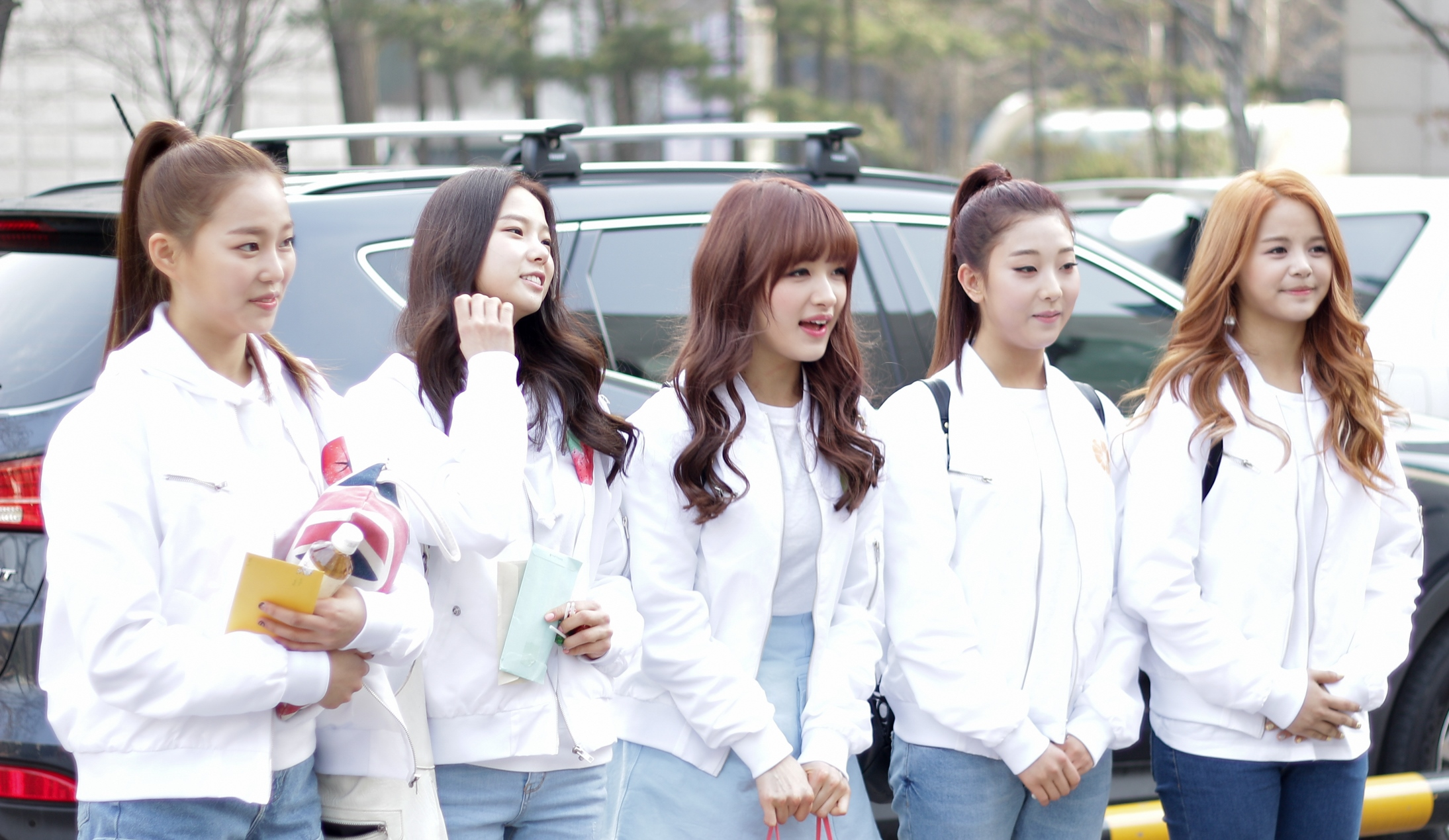
CLC in March 2015

CLC debuted in 2015 with a five-member lineup of Seunghee, Yujin, Seungyeon, Sorn, and Yeeun. They released their first EP First Love, including the lead single "Pepe", on March 19. Their debut showcase was held the day before at the Acts Hotel in Seoul, where they performed their debut song for the first time. They made their debut music show performance on M Countdown. "Pepe" is a retro dance number written by Duble Sidekick and Yang Geng. Part of the song's choreography was choreographed by Rain.

On April 16, CLC released a digital single titled "Eighteen", described as a song about teenage love influenced by 1960s/70s motown and 1980s synthpop. They began promotions for the single the following day on Music Bank. Their second EP Question was released on May 28. Its lead single "Curious (Like)". On October 10–11, CLC held their first overseas promotional tour in Malaysia entitled "First Love Promo Tour in Malaysia". For the tour, Universal Music Malaysia released an "Asia Special Edition" version of Question. The special version included tracks from First Love and Question, as well as the digital single "Eighteen".

=== 2016: Reformation as 7 members and Japanese debut ===
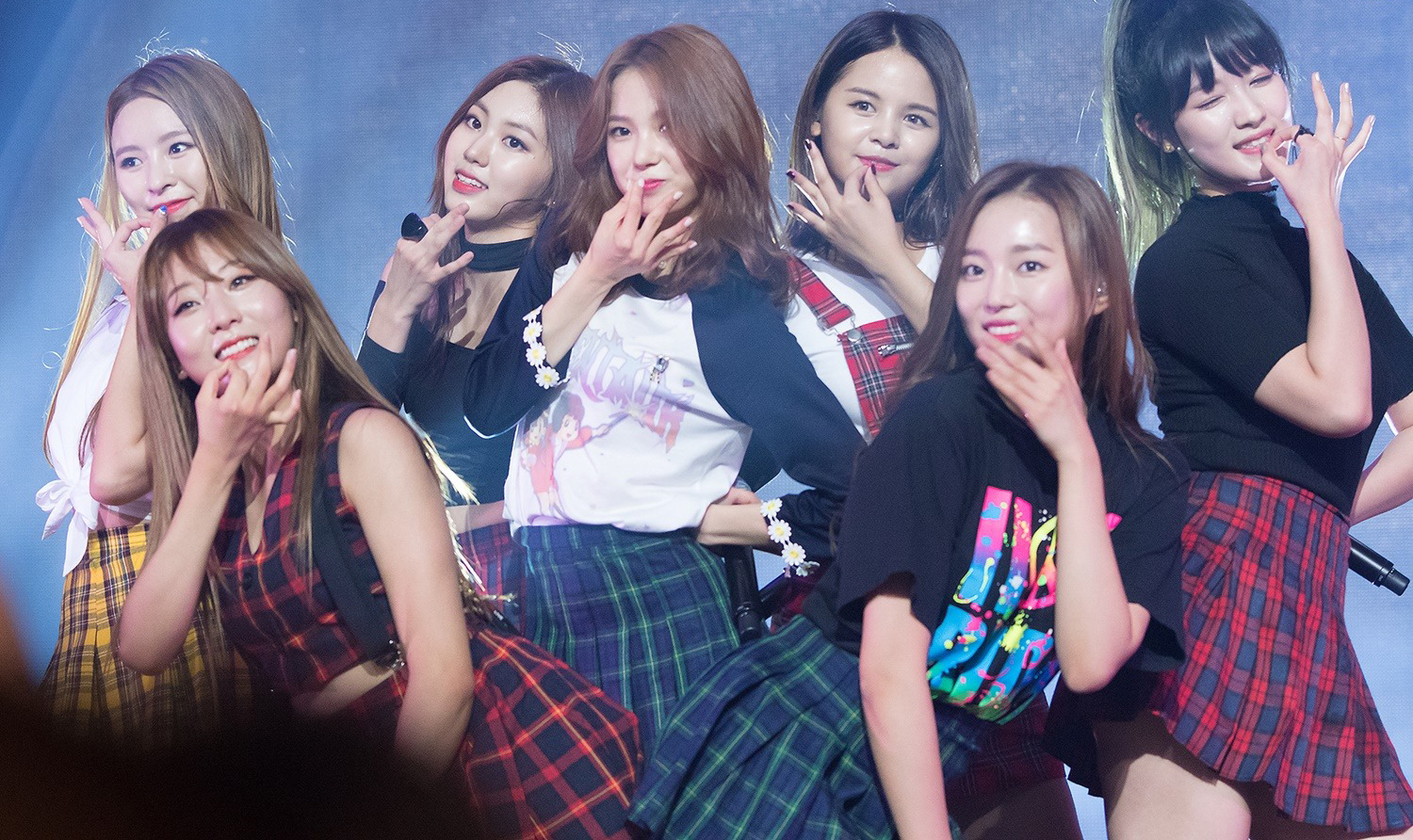
CLC at the Asia Music Stage on September 3, 2016

CLC's third EP Refresh and its lead single "High Heels" were released on February 29, 2016. This marked the addition of two new members: Elkie Chong and Kwon Eun-bin. Eunbin was a participant on Mnet's girl group survival show Produce 101 at the time. Cube Entertainment stated that Eunbin had originally been part of the group's original lineup, but was dropped following delays in production of the group's debut album. Due to Produce 101's contractual restrictions, Eunbin was prohibited from promoting the single "High Heels" on music shows or other broadcasts, nor appear in the single's music video. The agency planned for Eunbin to join promotions in the event that she was eliminated from the show, otherwise postponing her activities as part of the group until after Produce 101 promotions if she was a winner. On February 29, a short version of the "High Heels" music video that included Elkie but omitted Eunbin was released. The full version of the music video, including Eunbin, was released on March 21.

CLC made their Japanese debut on April 13 with the release of their first Japanese EP, High Heels. The album includes the Japanese version of "Pepe", "First Love", "Like", "High Heels", and a cover of Kylie Minogue's "I Should Be So Lucky".

On May 12, CLC launched their official Naver V App channel, followed by a broadcast of Eunbin's first live appearance with the group. The group released their fourth Korean EP Nu.Clear on May 30, with the title track "No Oh Oh" written by Shinsadong Tiger. CLC carried out album promotions as a seven-member group in June. On July 27, CLC released their second Japanese EP, Chamisma. The EP peaked at #9 on the Oricon Daily Albums Chart, making it their first release to enter the Top 10 of the Oricon chart.

=== 2017: International commercial breakthrough ===
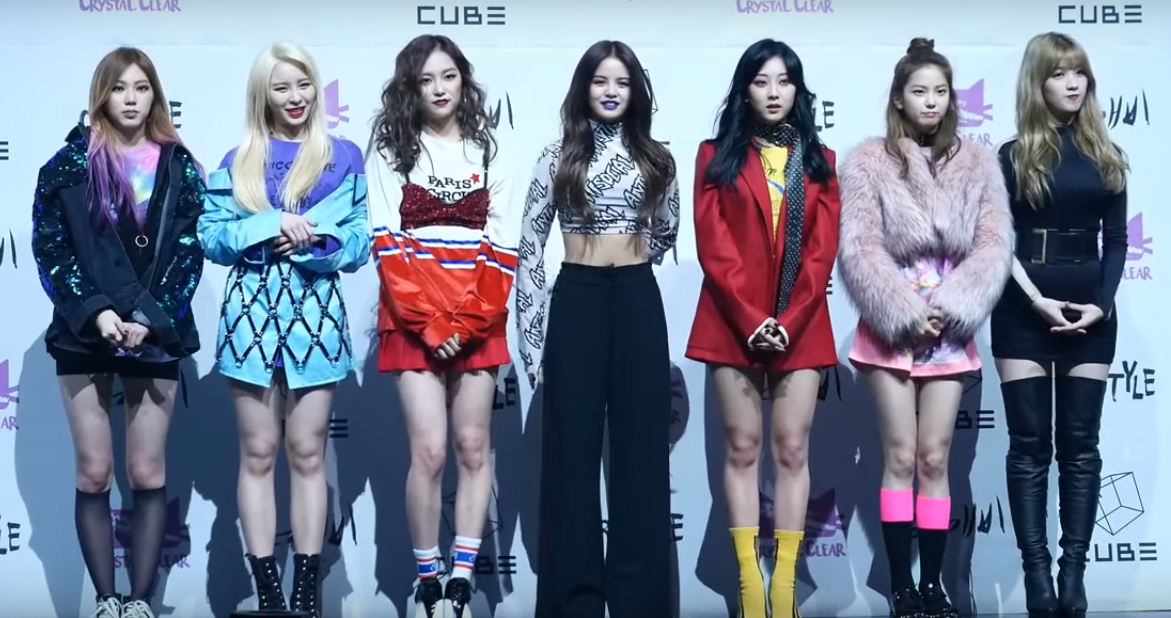
CLC at the Crystyle EP showcase on January 17, 2017

On January 9, CLC held their first solo Japan fanmeeting at Tower Records in Tokyo. On January 17, 2017, CLC released their fifth Korean EP, Crystyle. It marked a revamped image for the group, with a more charismatic, hip-hop based concept. The EP contains six tracks including the EDM/trap lead single "Hobgoblin" (도깨비), co-written by Seo Jae-woo, Big Sancho, Son Yeong-jin, and HyunA. Crystyle debuted on Billboard's World Albums chart at #6, while "Hobgoblin" peaked at #4 on the Billboard World Digital Song Sales chart. On May 27, the group held the first fan-meeting, "2017 Cheshire Entrance Ceremony", for their fan-club, Cheshire, taking place in the Olympic Hall Muse Live in Seoul.

CLC released their sixth EP, Free'sm on August 3. The album title is portmanteau upon the words "prism" and "free", describing the group's musical and conceptual direction for this EP. The album is inspired by 1990s girl groups Fin.K.L and S.E.S. It consists of six tracks including the R&B ballad lead single "Where Are You?" (어디야?). This was another new image for the group, contrasting with the group's previous concept with "Hobgoblin".

=== 2018–2020: Black Dress, No.1 and standalone singles ===
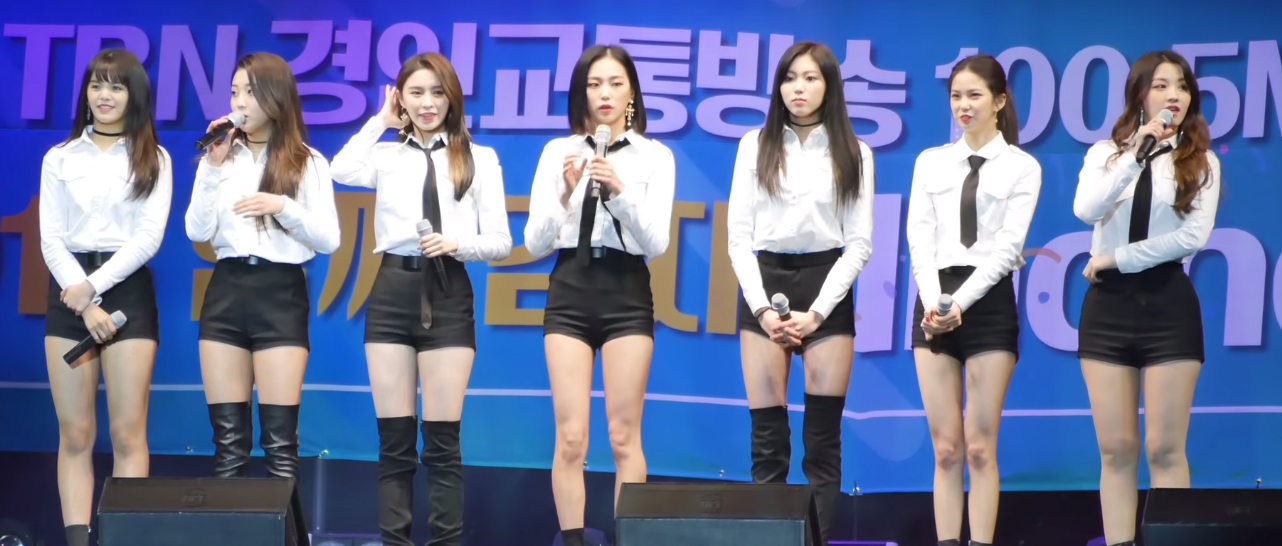
CLC at K-POP Sharing Festival in April 2018

The group released the digital single "To The Sky" on February 1, 2018, as a pre-release track of their upcoming EP. The group released their seventh extended play, Black Dress, on February 22. CLC held their third anniversary concert "Black Dress" on April 1. It was a donation-based charity concert where attendees made donations to a Diabetes Association. CLC held their CLC Live Show In Hong Kong 2018 – Black Dress concert at Macpherson Stadium in Hong Kong on July 20. On November 20, 2018, Cube Entertainment announced that Elkie would be making her official solo debut on November 23, 2018, with the digital single "I Dream".

On January 30, 2019, CLC released their eighth EP, No.1, with the title track "No". "No" is co-produced and co-written by label-mate Jeon So-yeon and co-written by member Yeeun. No.1 debuted at No. 5 on Billboard's World Albums chart. On February 12, CLC earned their first music show win on The Show with the title track "No". On May 29, the group released "Me" as a digital single. The song was co-written by member Yeeun. On September 6, CLC released their fourth digital single "Devil", with Yeeun contributing to the lyrics.

On March 1, 2020, Billboard reported that the singles "Me" and "Devil" debuted at number 5 and 7, respectively on the US World Digital Songs chart, months after their official releases with "Me" becoming the second best selling song that week only after BTS' "Black Swan". In May 2020, Yeeun joined the cast of the Mnet musical reality show, Good Girl. Yeeun participated on 3 songs as part of the Good Girl soundtrack: "Barbie", "Witch", and "Mermaid". She later promoted the former on the 672nd episode of M Countdown. She then released a special solo music video for "Mermaid" on the CLC YouTube channel in the run-up to CLC's September 2020 comeback, Helicopter. On August 13, 2020, Cube Entertainment announced that CLC would be making their comeback on September 2, 2020, nearly a year after their last release. On August 20, CLC released a new logo, a more simpler and mature monogram with the 'L' being stylised to look like an upside-down '7' in reference to the seven members. On August 21, Dive Studios announced that the group would be the hosts of the third season of the Idol 42 podcast, following CIX and Verivery, starting August 27. On September 2, CLC released their single, "Helicopter". Described as a "trap pop and EDM powerhouse song", "Helicopter" was co-written by member Yeeun. On September 17, 2020, CLC released promotional videos in collaboration with Seongdong-gu district, to promote the district's urban regeneration.

=== 2021-2024: Hiatus, departures from Cube, and solo activities ===
On December 25, 2020, Elkie sent a legal notice to Cube Entertainment requesting termination of her contract. She said she had not been paid for her acting activities, and that Cube Entertainment had already stopped their "developmental support" of CLC, putting the group's future on hold. On February 3, 2021, Cube Entertainment confirmed via an official statement that Elkie's contract with the company has been terminated. On March 9, Seunghee, Yeeun and Seungyeon released an OST titled "Another Level" for the Korean web drama Be My Boyfriend. On March 17, Cube Entertainment announced that Sorn would be making her official solo debut on March 23, with the English digital single "Run". On June 7, SPOTV News reported that Yujin would be participating in Mnet's survival show, Girls Planet 999. Later, on August 13, 2021, during an interview Yujin gave during the show, she mentioned while tearing up that she had been told by the company that "CLC will no longer be having group activities". Cube Entertainment did not confirm the statement. On October 22, during the finale of Girls Planet 999, Yujin ranked 3rd and secured her spot as a member and leader of the debuting group, Kep1er. On November 16, Cube Entertainment announced that Sorn had withdrawn from the group after her exclusive contract with the company was terminated. On December 3, 2021, Sorn signed with Wild Entertainment Group as a solo artist.

On March 18, 2022, Cube Entertainment announced that Seungyeon and Yeeun would be leaving the company following the expiration of their exclusive contracts, it was not mentioned if they had officially withdrawn from the group. On May 20, Cube Entertainment announced the discontinuation of the group's CLC U Cube global fansite service on June 6, as they had no group activities to provide anymore. On August 11, SuperBell Company announced that Yeeun had signed an exclusive contract with them as a solo artist. Also in 2022, Yujin's profile was removed from the Cube Entertainment website, confirming her departure from the company.

On February 8, 2023, Seungyeon signed with Wild Entertainment Group, joining Sorn. On March 7, while promoting her single "Not A Friend", Sorn commented on the group's status on a TikTok live stating that they "did not disband" and "right now everyone's just doing their own thing." She also explained her departure from Cube Entertainment, saying that it was because they allegedly did not want to promote CLC as a group anymore. On March 20, 2024, Cube Entertainment announced that Seunghee would be leaving the company as her contract had ended.

=== 2026–present: Reunion, Eunbin's departure and retirement ===
In May 2026, CLC announced they would reunite for concerts titled After All in Taiwan and Hong Kong for their 11th anniversary. The Taiwan date will take place on July 19, while the Hong Kong concerts would be on August 29 and 30. Yujin was reported to be absent for the concerts due to her obligations with Kep1er.

On May 22, 2026, Cube announced that Eunbin had left the agency following the conclusion of her contract, with the intention of retiring from the entertainment industry. Her concerts with CLC were expected to be her last activities. For the Hong Kong concerts, Yujin was announced to be able to join the group, marking CLC's first performance as a complete lineup since 2020. Following the tour, Eunbin retired and Yujin returned to activities with Kep1er.

== Philanthropy ==
Prior to their debut, the five original members of CLC busked to raise money for children with developmental disabilities. Profits from their b-side track, "Sharala", from their debut EP, First Love, were also donated to developmental disabilities charities. CLC's 3rd anniversary concert on April 1, 2018, was held for free, and attendees had the opportunity to donate to the Pediatric Diabetes Association, which CLC are ambassadors of. On November 17, 2020, CLC was named the ambassador to the "Korea Insulin Dependent Diabetes Association".

== Members ==
Current members

- Seunghee (승희) – vocalist
- Seungyeon (승연) – vocalist, leader
- Sorn (손) – vocalist
- Yeeun (예은) – rapper, vocalist
- Elkie (엘키) – vocalist

Inactive member

- Yujin (유진) – vocalist

Former member

- Eunbin (은빈) – vocalist, rapper

== Discography ==
=== Extended plays ===
Korean releases

- First Love (2015)
- Question (2015)
- Refresh (2016)
- Nu.Clear (2016)
- Crystyle (2017)
- Free'sm (2017)
- Black Dress (2018)
- No.1 (2019)

Japanese releases

- High Heels (2016)
- Chamisma (2016)

== Concerts ==
Headlining concerts

- CLC 3rd Anniversary Concert – "Black Dress" (April 1, 2018)
- CLC Live Show in Hong Kong 2018 – Black Dress (July 20, 2018)
- CLC 11th Anniversary Concert: After All in Taipei (July 19, 2026)
- CLC 11th Anniversary Concert: After All in Hong Kong (August 29–30, 2026)

Showcase

- Premiere Showcase: CLC (January 30, 2019)

== Filmography ==
=== Reality shows ===
Year	Title	Notes	Ref.
2015	CLC's Love Chemistry	Documentary series released through the group's YouTube channel	
2015	CLC's Queen's Game	Reality show consists of 5 episodes	
2015	CLC's Beautiful Mission	Reality show	
2016–2017	CLC Is	Reality show consists of 10 episodes	
2017–2022	CLC's Cheat Key	Behind-the-scenes content	
2018	Doom-CLC, Doodoom-CLC	14 episodes, 2-episode features per member	
2018	Seongdong-gu Resident CLC	Reality show consists of 10 episodes	

=== Podcasts ===
Year	Title	Notes	Ref.
2020	IDOL 42	Season 3	

== Awards and nominations ==
Name of the award ceremony, year presented, category, nominee of the award, and the result of the nomination
Award ceremony	Year	Category	Nominee / work	Result	Ref.
APAN Music Awards	2021	Idol Champ Fan's Pick – Group	CLC	Nominated	
APAN Music Awards	2021	Idol Champ Global Pick – Group	CLC	Nominated	
Asia Artist Awards	2018	Popularity Award – Singer	CLC	Nominated	
Asia Artist Awards	2019	Popularity Award – Singer	CLC	Nominated	
Asia Artist Awards	2019	StarNews Popularity Award – Female Group	CLC	Nominated	
Asia Artist Awards	2020	Popularity Award – Singer (Female)	CLC	Nominated	
Asia Artist Awards	2021	RET Popularity Award – Singer (Female)	CLC	Nominated	
Asia Artist Awards	2021	U+Idol Live Popularity Award – Singer (Female)	CLC	Nominated	
Daradaily Awards	2018	The Next Rising Star of Asia Award	CLC	Won	
Gaon Chart Music Awards	2016	New Artist of the Year - Album	CLC	Nominated	
Golden Disc Awards	2016	Rookie of the Year Award	CLC	Nominated	
Golden Disc Awards	2016	Popularity Award	CLC	Nominated	
Golden Disc Awards	2016	Global Popularity Award	CLC	Nominated	
Korean Culture Entertainment Awards	2015	Rookie Award	CLC	Won	
Melon Music Awards	2015	Best New Artist	CLC	Nominated	
Mnet Asian Music Awards	2015	Best New Female Artist	CLC	Nominated	
Mnet Asian Music Awards	2015	Artist of the Year	CLC	Nominated	
Seoul Music Awards	2016	Bonsang Award	CLC	Nominated	
Seoul Music Awards	2016	Rookie of the Year Award	CLC	Nominated	
Seoul Music Awards	2016	Popularity Award	CLC	Nominated	
Seoul Music Awards	2016	Hallyu Special Award	CLC	Nominated	
Seoul Music Awards	2017	Bonsang Award	CLC	Nominated	
Seoul Music Awards	2017	Popularity Award	CLC	Nominated	
Seoul Music Awards	2017	Hallyu Special Award	CLC	Nominated	
Soompi Awards	2015	Rookie of the Year	CLC	Nominated	
Soompi Awards	2018	Breakout Artist	CLC	Nominated	
Soompi Awards	2018	Best Choreography	"Hobgoblin"	Nominated	
Soribada Best K-Music Awards	2019	Music Star Award	CLC	Won	
Soribada Best K-Music Awards	2019	Female Popularity Award	CLC	Nominated	
