= Refresh (EP) =

- From left to right: Seunghee, Yujin, Elkie, Eunbin, Yeeun, Seungyeon and Sorn.

EP by CLC
- Released: February 29, 2016
- Recorded: 2015–2016
- Genre: K-pop; dance-pop
- Language: Korean
- Label: Cube; CJ E&M

CLC chronology
Question (2015)	Refresh (2016)	High Heels (2016)

Singles from Refresh
- 1. "Eighteen" Released: April 16, 2015; 2. "High Heels" Released: February 29, 2016

Refresh is the third extended play by South Korean girl group CLC. It released on February 29, 2016. It was CLC's first release as a seven-member group. "High Heels" was released as the lead single of the EP.

== Release ==
CLC announced their comeback with two additional members that were revealed to be Elkie, and Produce 101 contestant, Kwon Eun-bin. However, due to Eunbin's appearance in Produce 101, she was not able to join CLC's promotions on music shows or broadcast. Eunbin's parts in the music video were also deleted and she postponed her activities with CLC until she was eliminated from Produce 101. CLC released a short version of their promotional single, "High Heels" on February 29, 2016. The full version of the music video was uploaded on March 20.

CLC began promoting as a 6-member group on Mnet's M Countdown on March 3.

The single "Eighteen" was released April 5, 2015 by Cube Entertainment, and was later included on Refresh EP. "Eighteen" is a 60-70's motown and synth pop 80's song that expresses youthful love experienced when you're 18. On March 17, the group started to promote the song by performing their first stage on KBS's Music Bank.

== Track listing ==
No.	Title	Lyrics	Music	Arrangement	Length
1.	"High Heels" (예뻐지게; Yeppeojige)	No Jun-hwan, Iggy	Lee Hyun-seung, DOM	Lee Hyun-seung, DOM, Jeinho	3:24
2.	"Refresh"	GHIGH, GDLO (Mono Tree)	GHIGH, GDLO, Choi Young-kyung (Mono Tree)	GHIGH, GDLO (Mono Tree)	3:26
3.	"Yaya (Say Bye to Solo)"	Big Sancho	Big Sancho	Big Sancho	3:13
4.	"Friend Lover Zone" (오빠친구; Oppachingu)	Jung Il-hoon	Ferdy, Adam Kulling, Alice Gernanot	Ferdy, Adam Kulling	3:25
5.	"Eighteen"	Kim Geon-woo	Kim Geon-woo	Kim Geon-woo, Song Gi-hong	3:29
Total length:					16:57

== Charts ==
Chart (2016)	Peak position
South Korean Albums (Gaon)	6

=== Singles ===
"Eighteen"
Chart (2015)	Peak position
South Korea (Gaon Download)	370

== Release history ==
Country	Date	Distributing label	Format
South Korea	February 29, 2016	Cube Entertainment; CJ E&M Music	CD, Digital download
Worldwide	February 29, 2016	Cube Entertainment; CJ E&M Music	CD, Digital download
