= First Love (EP) =

- From left to right: Yeeun, Seungyeon, Yujin, Sorn and Seunghee/Digital cover and First Love version/Color pink and white version instead of other colours except for Pink and White.

EP by CLC
- Released: March 19, 2015
- Recorded: 2015
- Genre: K-pop; dance-pop
- Length: 17:03
- Language: Korean
- Label: Cube; CJ E&M

CLC chronology
First Love (2015)	Question (2015)

Singles from First Love
- 1. "Pepe" Released: March 19, 2015

First Love is the debut extended play by South Korean girl group CLC. It was released on March 19, 2015 by Cube Entertainment. "Pepe" was released as the lead single.

== Background ==
In March 2015, CUBE Entertainment launched the multi-national girl group CLC including original members Seunghee, Yujin, Seungyeon, Sorn and Yeeun. The group held their debut showcase on March 18 at the AX Hall in Gwangjang-dong, Seoul, performing tracks from their debut album. The group made their official debut on March 19 at Mnet's M Countdown performing with the tracks "First Love" and their promotional single, "Pepe". They also released the mini-album and music video for "Pepe" on the same day.

The album "First Love" has a total of five tracks. Duble Sidekick, Seo Jaewoo, Playing Kid, Yanggang, and BTOB's Jung Il-hoon participated in the creation of album as producers and lyricist. The album aims to represent CLC's undeniable charms. The point choreography of the song was created by Rain. At their debut showcase, the members revealed that all the proceeds of the album will be donated to children with developmental disabilities.

In 2016, CLC released a Mandarin version of their song, "First Love" (初恋), for the Chinese drama, The Best Meeting (最好的遇见).

== Track listing ==
No.	Title	Lyrics	Music	Arrangement	Length
1.	"Cafe Mocha Please" (카페모카 주세요)	Jung Il-hoon	Seo Jaewoo, Ferdy	Seo Jaewoo, Ferdy	3:25
2.	"Pepe"	Long Candy	Duble Sidekick, Yanggang	Yanggang	3:17
3.	"Sharala" (샤랄라)	ZigZag Note, MAFLY, 노는어린니	ZigZag Note, 노는어린니	ZigZag Note, 노는어린니	3:21
4.	"First Love" (첫사랑)	Jo Seong-ho, Ferdy	Jo Seong-ho, Ferdy	Jo Seong-ho, Ferdy	3:41
5.	"Opening the Window" (창문을 열고)	Seo Jaewoo, Seo Yongbae, Jung Il-hoon	Seo Jaewoo, Seo Yongbae	Seo Jaewoo, Seo Yongbae	3:34
Total length:					17:03

== Charts ==
Chart (2015)	Peak position
South Korean Albums (Gaon)	9
