= Kwon Eun-bin =

South Korean former singer and actress (born 2000)

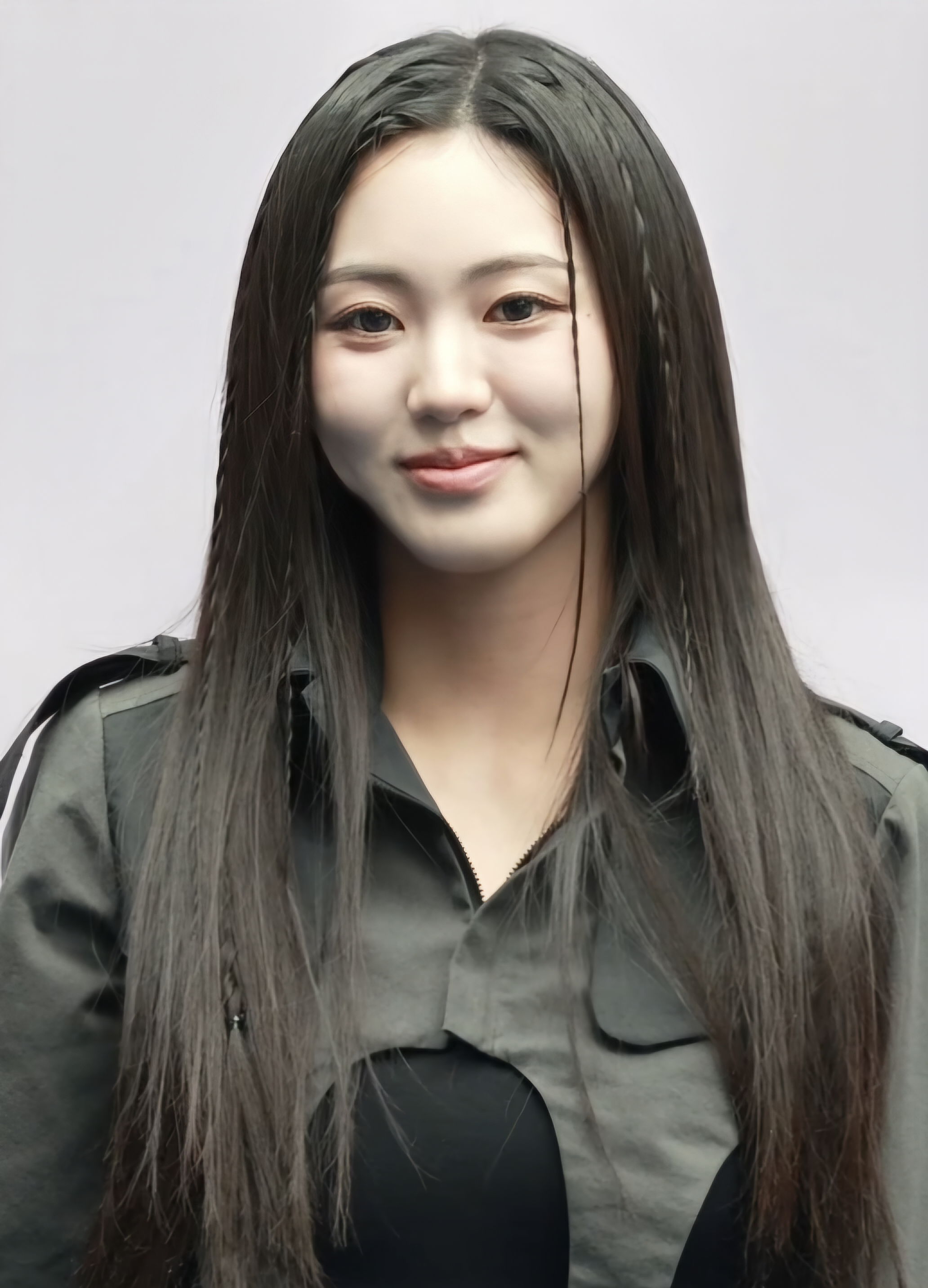
- Kwon in September 2024
- Born: January 6, 2000 (age 26); Seocho District, Seoul, South Korea
- Education: Hanlim Multi Art School
- Occupations: Singer; actress; model
- Years active: 2016–2026
- Musical career
- Genre: K-pop
- Instrument: Vocals
- Years active: 2016–2022, 2026
- Label: Cube
- Member of: CLC
- Formerly of: United Cube

Korean name
- Hangul: 권은빈
- RR: Gwon Eunbin
- MR: Kwŏn Ŭnbin

Kwon Eun-bin (Korean: 권은빈, born January 6, 2000), also known simply as Eunbin, is a South Korean former singer and actress. She participated in the first season of Produce 101 (2016), before being eliminated in the penultimate episode. She debuted as a member of the South Korean girl group CLC in February 2016 with the release of the group's third EP Refresh. She made her acting debut in the television series Bad Papa (2018) and has since appeared in series including Top Management (2018), At a Distance, Spring Is Green (2021), Dear.M (2022) and Duty After School (2023).

== Early life and education ==
Kwon Eun-bin was born on January 6, 2000, in Seoul. Her father is a photojournalist. She attended Wonmyong Elementary School, Yangji Elementary School, Onham Middle School, and Hanlim Multi Art School.

== Career ==
=== 2016: Produce 101 ===
On January 22, 2016, Kwon came in limelight when she was introduced as a contestant on a Mnet reality girl group survival show, Produce 101. Produce 101 was to produce a girl group from a pool of 101 female trainees from 46 different companies. Kwon Eun-bin represented Cube Entertainment on Produce 101, alongside Jeon So-yeon, who later debuted as the leader of (G)I-dle, and Lee Yoon-seo, a former trainee at the company. Kwon was eliminated from the show in the tenth episode and thus did not debut as a member of the consequent group, I.O.I.

=== 2016–2022: Career with CLC ===
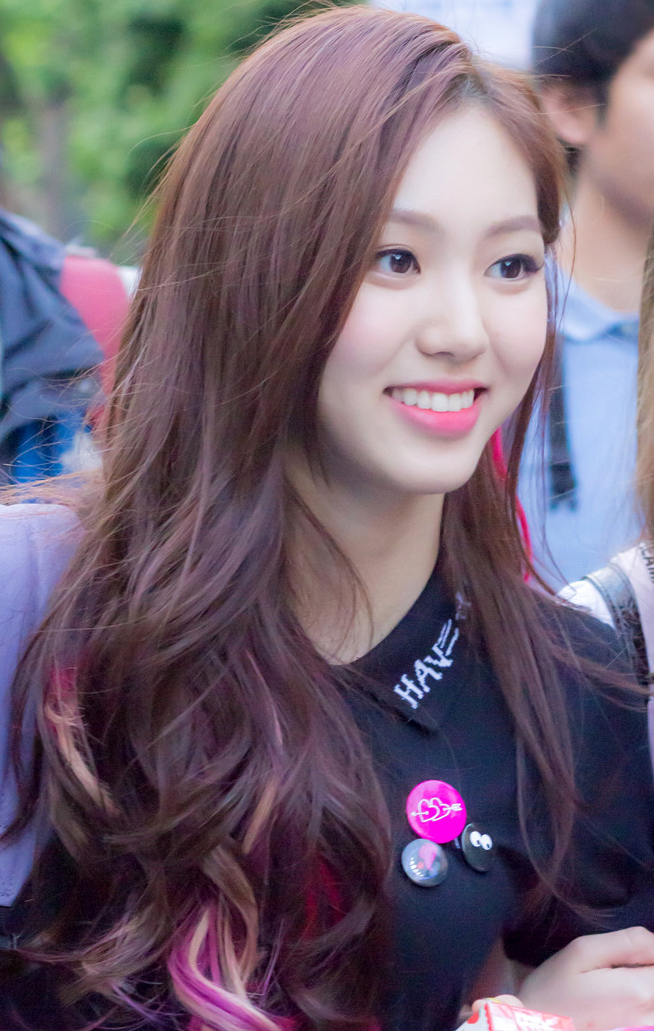
Kwon in 2016

According to Cube Entertainment, Kwon was originally due to debut with CLC in 2015, but her debut was postponed after the release of the group's third EP was delayed. Due to Produce 101's contractual restrictions, she was unable to join the group to promote "High Heels" on music shows. The agency planned for Kwon to join promotions for "High Heels" if she was eliminated, or postpone her activities with CLC if she were to secure a top 11 ranking on Produce 101. On May 12, CLC opened their V Live channel, this was followed by a live broadcast with the whole group, including Kwon. She began full promotional activities as a member of the group with the release of Nu.Clear in May 2016. A month later, her activities with the group were temporarily paused due to health problems. Within days, she resumed her group activities after recovering.

Since her debut with CLC, Kwon has participated in six of the group's Korean EPs, both of their Japanese EPs and three of their singles. She has also contributed rap lyrics to the song, "Like That" from the group's seventh EP, Black Dress, released in February 2018.

CLC's activities under Cube Entertainment were officially ended in May 2022.

=== 2018–2026: Solo activities, acting projects and retirement ===
On March 21, 2018, Kwon made her runway debut, modelling for Jarrett, at the 2018 F/W Hera Seoul Fashion Week.

On June 26, 2018, it was announced that Kwon would make her debut as a television actress, playing Kim Sang-ah in the MBC drama series Bad Papa. The drama began airing in September of the same year. The same year she was also cast in the YouTube Premium web series, Top Management as the character Eun-bin (named for her), a member of the popular in-show girl group, Apple Mint.

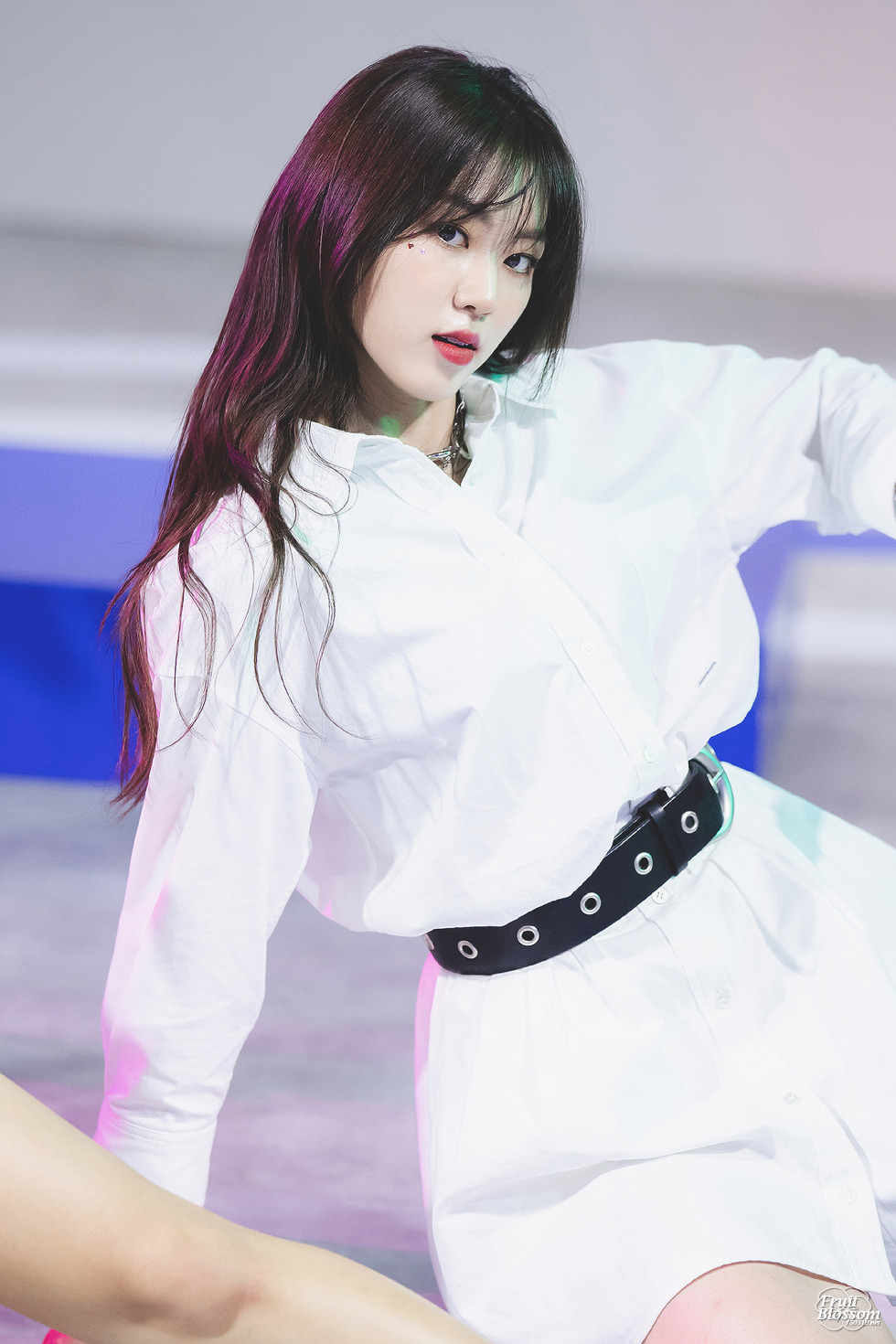
Kwon performing in 2019

On July 8, 2019, it was revealed that Kwon had been cast in the KBS2 drama Beautiful Love, Wonderful Life as Kim Yeon-ah. She left the role due to scheduling conflicts, prior to production.

On January 21, 2020, TV Chosun announced that Kwon would be part of the cast for the new sitcom Somehow Family. The drama began airing in March before being put on indefinite hiatus, after two episodes were aired. In March 2021, Somehow Family was confirmed to renew broadcasting on TV Chosun, from March 21, as a fully pre-filmed drama, with Kwon reprising her role as Seong Ha-neul.

In October 2020, Kwon joined the cast of series Dear.M, a spin-off of the popular Korean web drama, Love Playlist. She was cast in the role of Min Yang-hee, a first year student in the Computer Science Department at Seoyeon University. In February 2021, Kwon was officially announced as part of the cast the KBS2 adaptation of the webtoon, At a Distance, Spring Is Green. She was cast in the role of Wang Young-ran, a fourth year P.E. major at Myeongil University. In February 2022, it was confirmed that Kwon would be playing a major role in TVING's original sci-fi thriller, Duty After School, based on the webtoon of the same name. It premiered on March 31, 2023, on TVING.

In June 2024, Kwon appeared as Gil Ye-ji in the Netflix drama, Hierarchy. In July 2024, Kwon appeared as the female lead in Woori Bank's financial education web drama, I Love You Bit by Bit. In September 2024, it was announced that Kwon would lead in the first episode of the anthology sci-fi series, Mystic, based on the webtoon, New Mystery Theatre. She was awarded the Rising Star Award for Acting by the 2024 Asia Model Awards.

Following her departure from Cube Entertainment in 2026, she announced her intention to retire from the entertainment industry and live as a private citizen. She reunited with CLC for their After All concerts in Taiwan in July 2026 and Hong Kong in August 2026 before retiring from the entertainment industry.

== Discography ==
=== Songwriting credits ===
All credits are adapted from the Korea Music Copyright Association, unless stated otherwise.

Year	Song	Album	Artist(s)	Lyrics
Year	Song	Album	Artist(s)	With
2018	"Like That"	Black Dress	CLC	Jerry Potter, Yeeun
2018	"Young and One"	One	United Cube	Hyuna, Seo Yong-bae (Tenten), Minhyuk, Peniel, BreadBeat (Tenten), E'Dawn, Wooseok, Yuto, Soyeon, Yeeun, Seo Jae-woo (Tenten)

== Filmography ==
=== Television series ===
Year	Title	Role	Notes	Ref.
2018	Bad Papa	Kim Sang-ah		
2020	Do Do Sol Sol La La Sol	Jung Ga-yeong	Guest appearance (Ep.13−15)	
2020–2021	Somehow Family	Seong Ha-neul		
2021	Youth of May	Yu-jin	Cameo (Episode 1)	
2021	At a Distance, Spring Is Green	Wang Young-ran		
2022	Dear.M	Min Yang-hee		
2025	Check-in Hanyang	Do-gyeong	Guest role, appeared in 2 episodes	
2025	KBS Drama Special – Love : Track: Minji Minji Minji	Song Min-ji		

=== Web series ===
Year	Title	Role	Notes	Ref.
2018	Top Management	Eun-bin		
2023	Duty After School	Yeon Bo-ra		
2024	Hierarchy	Gil Ye-ji		
2024	I Love You Bit by Bit	Jeong-min		
TBA	Mystic	Jin Joo-ri	Episode 1: Mosquito's Mouth	

=== Television shows ===
Year	Title	Role	Notes	Ref.
2016	Produce 101	Herself	Survival show that determined I.O.I members. (Eliminated in episode 10)	

=== Radio ===
Year	Title	Role	Notes	Ref.
2020	Idol Radio	Guest host	with CLC's Seungyeon, January 29, 2020	

== Awards and nominations ==
Name of the award ceremony, year presented, category, nominee of the award, and the result of the nomination
Award ceremony	Year	Category	Nominee / Work	Result	Ref.
K-Model Awards with AMF GLOBAL	2021	Actress – Popularity Award	Herself	Won	
Blue Dragon Series Awards	2023	Best New Actress	Duty After School	Nominated	
Asia Model Awards	2024	Rising Star Award for Acting	Herself	Won	
