= Sorn (singer) =

Thai singer (born 1996)

- ชลนสร สัจจกุล
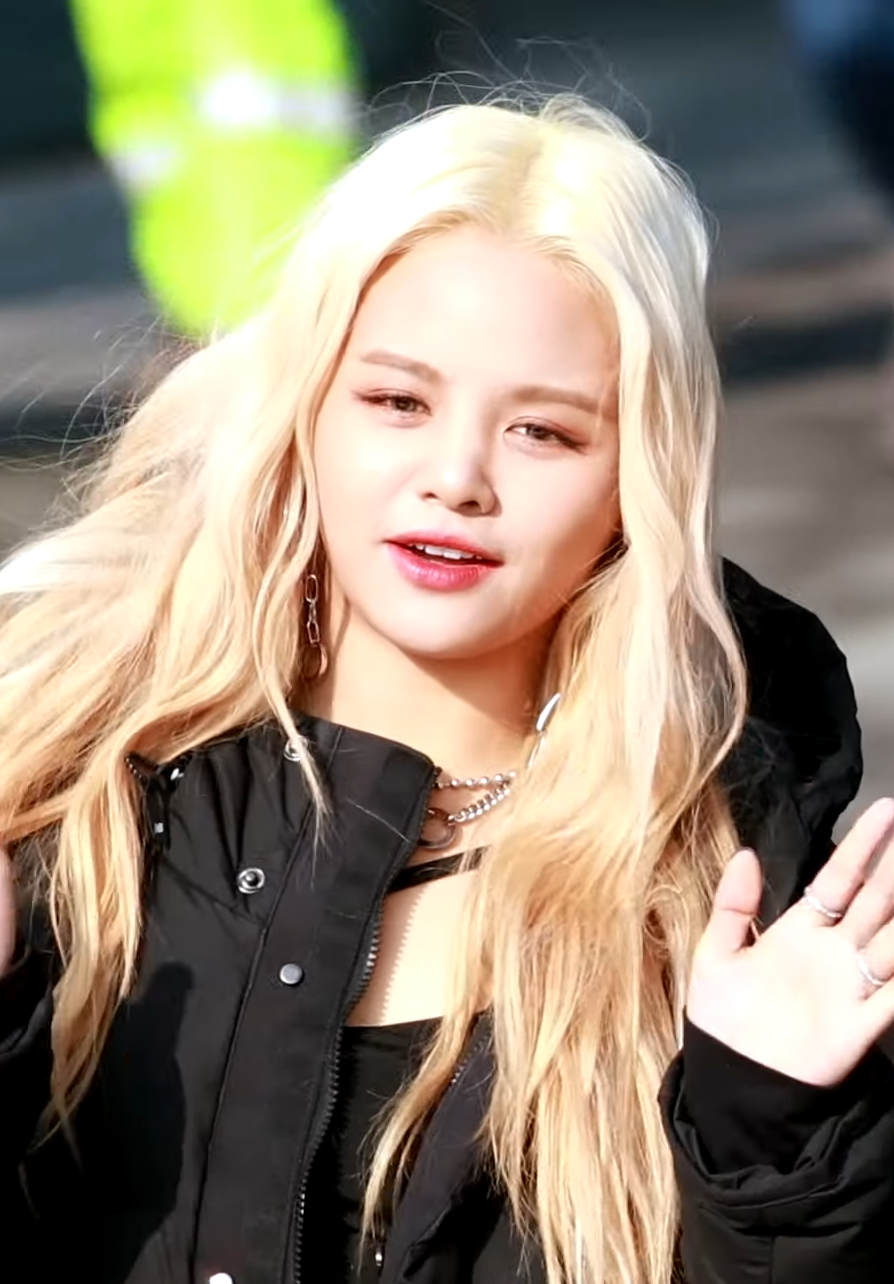
- Sorn in 2020
- Born: Chonnasorn Sajakul; November 18, 1996 (age 29); Bangkok, Thailand
- Other names: Kim So-eun 김소은
- Education: KIS International School; Korea Kent Foreign School
- Occupations: Singer; YouTuber
- Years active: 2011–present
- Father: Wanasthana Sajakul
- Relatives: Teerapat Sajakul (half-brother)
- Musical career
- Origin: South Korea
- Genres: K-pop; T-pop
- Instrument: Vocals
- Labels: Cube; WILD
- Member of: CLC
- Formerly of: United Cube

YouTube information
- Channel: SORN
- Genres: Music; vlogging
- Subscribers: 1.52 million
- Views: 402 million
- Last updated: 27 November 2025

Thai name
- Thai: ชลนสร สัจจกุล; Chonnasorn Sajakul

Chonnasorn Sajakul (Thai: ชลนสร สัจจกุล; RTGS: Chonnason Satchakun; born November 18, 1996), known professionally as Sorn (Korean: 손; Thai: สร), is a Thai singer based in South Korea. She was the winner of the first season of K-Pop Star Hunt in 2011. She later debuted as a member of the South Korean girl group, CLC, under Cube Entertainment, from their debut in March 2015 until her departure from the group in November 2021. She also produces videos for her YouTube channel Produsorn (stylized in all caps), which launched in 2019. On December 3, 2021, Sorn signed with Wild Entertainment Group as a solo artist.

== Early life ==
As a child, her mother allowed her to have vocal lessons at the Grammy Vocal Studio, in Bangkok, to achieve her goal of becoming a singer. She was born into a middle-class family. Her father, Wanasthana Sajakul, was a former member of the Thai parliament and former manager of the Thailand national football team, and her half-brother, Teerapat Sajakul, is an actor and singer in her home country.

Sorn was enrolled at an international school, in Thailand, from the age of 2. She was a student at the KIS International School in Bangkok and later graduated from the Korea Kent Foreign School in Seoul.

== Career ==
=== Pre-debut ===
In 2011, Sorn competed in tvN's K-Pop Star Hunt and was named winner of the first season.

Sorn moved to Korea to train at Cube Entertainment at 15. At the time, she was the company's first foreign, non-Korean trainee.

In 2012, she did a collaboration song with G.NA called "Because You Are The One," sung in English. In 2013, Sorn appeared in the documentary, Seoul: Capital of K-Pop (Inside K-Pop) where she talked about her trainee life and what it involved and appeared in a documentary which was focused on her future bandmate, Oh Seung-hee.

=== 2015–2021: Debut with CLC and solo activities ===
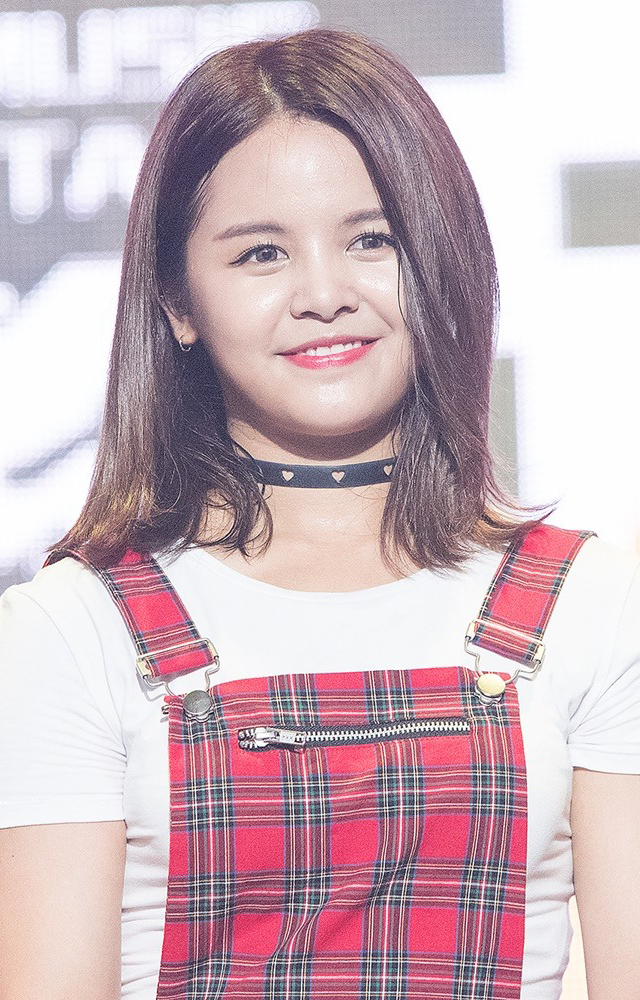
Sorn in 2016

Sorn was revealed as the first member of the girl group CLC. The group officially debuted on March 19, 2015, with their debut extended play, First Love.

On April 21, Sorn began livestreaming on the United Cube YouTube channel with her Cheat Key live series, Produsorn Live. The series ran for eight episodes until May 26, and featured her fellow CLC members. The series marked Cube Entertainment's first foray into YouTube livestreaming.

In January 2019, Sorn launched her own YouTube channel, also named Produsorn. Her videos are now uploaded exclusively on the Produsorn channel. She uploads a mixture of vlogs, song covers, Q&As, and unboxing videos. On August 18, 2021, Sorn had revealed that she deleted all her previous videos and has restarted her channel. Sorn originally began posting videos on TikTok in early 2020. She has accumulated over 2.5 million followers on the platform, as of September 2021.

In October 2020, Sorn released her first jewelry collection, Rise, in collaboration with Kapsul Collective. In December, she was announced as a participant in the trot reality show Miss Trot 2. The show will premiere on December 17. She was eliminated in the first round.

On February 8, 2021, Sorn surprise-launched her first makeup line, Don't Waste My Time, in collaboration with VT Cosmetics. On February 11, 2021, Cube TV’s reality program Steve JobSon premiered. The show documents the creation and development of the makeup line.

From March 9, Sorn began teasing a solo release on TikTok. On March 18, 2021, Cube Entertainment confirmed that Sorn would be making her solo debut on March 23 with the English digital single, "Run". Sorn personally participated in the cover artwork and music video for the release. Written and produced by Candace Sosa, "Run" is an acoustic pop song that is expected to present a charm that embodies the warm atmosphere of spring. Sorn was later featured on Emily Mei's debut single "My Domain", alongside Amber Liu on November 9.

=== 2021–present: Departure from Cube, signing with Wild ===
On November 16, 2021, Cube Entertainment announced the termination of Sorn's contract with the label and her departure from CLC. The following month, it was announced that Sorn had signed with Wild Entertainment Group as a solo artist.

Sorn released her second single, "Sharp Objects", in February 2022. This was followed by the singles "Scorpio" in April, and "Save Me" in June. In September, she released "Nirvana Girl" featuring former CLC bandmate Yeeun. In May 2023, Sorn collaborated with Dutch DJ duo Yellow Claw in the song "Cold Like Snow". In August, she released "Rowdy" featuring former CLC bandmate Seungyeon.

In February 2024, Sorn released the Valentine’s Day single "Cool". Subsequent released included "Crazy Stupid Lovers" featuring former Cube labelmate and Pentagon member Hongseok in May, and "Bad4Us" in July, a collaboration with Australia-based Filipino singer J.Tajor. In October, she released her debut EP, Heartstorm. In April 2025, Sorn collaborated with the Indonesian DJ Whisnu Santika on the song "Lov3". In December, she released the song "Reservations" featuring i-dle's Minnie. In February 2026, she released the single "Call It What You Want". Sorn's debut album, Letters Left Unread, was released the following month.

== Activism ==
In 2017, Sorn began campaigning for fair royalty payments for foreign musicians based in South Korea. In a Facebook live interview she revealed that she was being paid six times less than her Korean members, but also acknowledged that her agency tried to help the situation. In an Instagram story posted in 2019, Sorn stated that the issue had been resolved with the Federation of Korean Music Performers (FKMP).

== Personal life ==
In 2023, it was reported that Sorn maintained a residence in Singapore, and shuttled between Korea, Thailand, and Singapore. In a later interview, Sorn revealed that she spent half a year in Singapore, making music in both Korea and Singapore.

== Discography ==
=== Studio album ===
Title	Details
Letters Left Unread	Released: March 27, 2026; Label: Wild Entertainment Group; Format: Digital download, streaming

=== EP ===
Title	Details
Heartstorm	Released: October 18, 2024; Label: Wild Entertainment Group; Format: digital download, streaming

=== Singles ===
==== As lead artist ====
Title	Year	Peak position		Album
Title	Year	KOR	US	Album
"Run"	2021	—	—	Non-album singles
"Sharp Objects"	2022	—	—	Non-album singles
"Scorpio"	2022	—	—	Non-album singles
"Save Me"	2022	—	—	Non-album singles
"Nirvana Girl" (ft. Yeeun)	2022	—	—	Non-album singles
"Not A Friend"	2023	—	—	Non-album singles
"Rowdy" (ft. Seungyeon)	2023	—	—	Non-album singles
"Cool"	2024	—	—	Non-album singles
"Crazy Stupid Lovers" (ft. Hongseok)	2024	—	—	Non-album singles
"Bad4Us" (ft. J.Tajor)	2024	—	—	Non-album singles
"Nobody"	2024	—	—	Heartstorm
"Bad4Us"	2024	—	—	Heartstorm
"Reservations" (ft. Minnie)	2025	—	—	Letters Left Unread
"Call It What You Want"	2026	—	—	Letters Left Unread
"—" denotes releases that did not chart or were not released in that region.

==== Collaborations ====
Year	Title	Artist	Album
2012	"Because You Are The One"	G.NA	Oui
2018	"Follow Your Dreams" (한걸음)	United Cube	One
2021	"My Domain"	Emily Mei ft. Amber Liu	Digital single
2023	"Cold Like Snow"	Yellow Claw	Digital single
2025	"Lov3"	Whisnu Santika	Digital single

== Videography ==
=== Music videos ===
Title	Year	Director(s)	Ref.
"Run"	2021	Kaya Wong	
"Sharp Objects"	2022	Dan P.	
"Scorpio"	2022	Phurichearth	
"Nirvana Girl" (ft. Yeeun)	2022	Dreamplug	
"Rowdy" (ft. Seungyeon)	2023	Unknown	
"Cool"	2024	Telescope Studios	
"Crazy Stupid Lovers" (ft. Hongseok)	2024	Unknown	

== Filmography ==
=== Television ===
Year	Title	Role	Notes	Ref.
2010	Fai Amata	Kaiwei Yao		
2011	K-Pop Star Hunt	Herself	Audition show, Sorn won to become Cube trainee	
2013	Seoul: Capital of K-Pop (Inside K-Pop)	Herself		
2014	Cube Entertainment's Way of Training Sorn	Herself	Documentary	
2014	When Charles Met Chulsoo	Herself	Documentary	
2015	Simply K-Pop	Host	October 30	
2016	Idol Party	Herself	With NCT's Yuta	
2017	What Shall We Eat Today	Herself		
2019	Let's Get Rich X OGN	Herself	OGN Game Trip to Thailand with Teen Top's Neil	
2019	Foreigners in Korea	Herself		
2019	Simply K-Pop	Host	February 22 – March 1	
2020	Miss Trot 2	Herself		
2021	Steve JobSon	Herself	Documenting the creation of her makeup line	
2021	Guide Map K-Road Season 2	Herself	Travel documentary series, with CLC's Oh Seung-hee	
2021	Goal Kicking Ladies	Herself		

=== Radio show ===
Year	Title	Network	Notes	Ref.
2019	Skool of K-Pop	TBS eFM 101.3 MHz (Seoul) and beFM 90.5 MHz (Busan), Naver	Relief Host	

== Awards and nominations ==
Year	Award	Nominated work	Result	Ref.
2018	2018 Outstanding Filial Piety Award	—N/a	Won	
