= Somebody (15& song) =

Single by 15&

from the album Sugar
- Language: Korean
- Released: April 7, 2013
- Length: 3:10
- Label: JYP
- Composers: Sim Eun-ji, Ryan S. Jhun
- Lyricists: Sim Eun-ji; Ryan S. Jhun; Antwann Frost

15& singles chronology
"I Dream" (2012)	"Somebody" (2013)	"Can't Hide It" (2014)

Music video
- "Somebody" on YouTube

"Somebody" is a song recorded by South Korean duo 15& for their first studio album Sugar. It was released as a single by JYP Entertainment on April 7, 2013.

== Background and release ==
On March 29, 2013, 15& released a teaser with the phrases '2008 Nobody, 2013 Somebody' and '2013 04/07'. '2008 Nobody' implies the hit song "Nobody" of Wonder Girls in 2008, and the following '2013 Somebody' reveals that 15&'s comeback song would be called "Somebody".

== Composition ==
"Somebody" Is written by Sim Eun-ji, Ryan S. Jhun and Antwann Frost and composed by Sim Eun-ji and Ryan S. Jhun. The song is composed in the key D-sharp Minor and has 176 beats per minute and a running time of 3 minutes and 10 seconds. "Somebody" is a song that contains the unique groove and soulful voice color of Park Ji-min and Baek Ye-rin.

== Promotion ==
15& held their first comeback stage for "Somebody" on Mnet's M Countdown on April 11, 2013, MBC's Show! Music Core on April 20 and SBS' Inkigayo on April 14 and 21.

== Music video ==
The music video shows the bright atmosphere of the song. Parody of, competition show K-pop Star Park Ji-min played Park Jin-young and Yang Hyun-seok as judges, and Baek Ye-rin captured the characteristics of BoA being a judge and expressed it comically.

== Charts ==
=== Weekly charts ===
Weekly chart performance for "Somebody"
Chart (2013)	Peak position
South Korea (Gaon)	3
South Korea (K-pop Hot 100)	10

=== Monthly charts ===
Monthly chart performance for "Somebody"
Chart (April 2013)	Peak position
South Korea (Gaon)	9

=== Year-end charts ===
2023 year-end chart performance for "Somebody"
Chart (2013)	Position
South Korea (Gaon)	58

== Sales ==
Country	Sales
South Korea (digital)	746,025

== Release history ==
Release history for "Somebody"
Region	Date	Format	Label
Various	April 7, 2013	Digital download	JYP
