= Jang Ye-eun =

South Korean musician (born 1998)

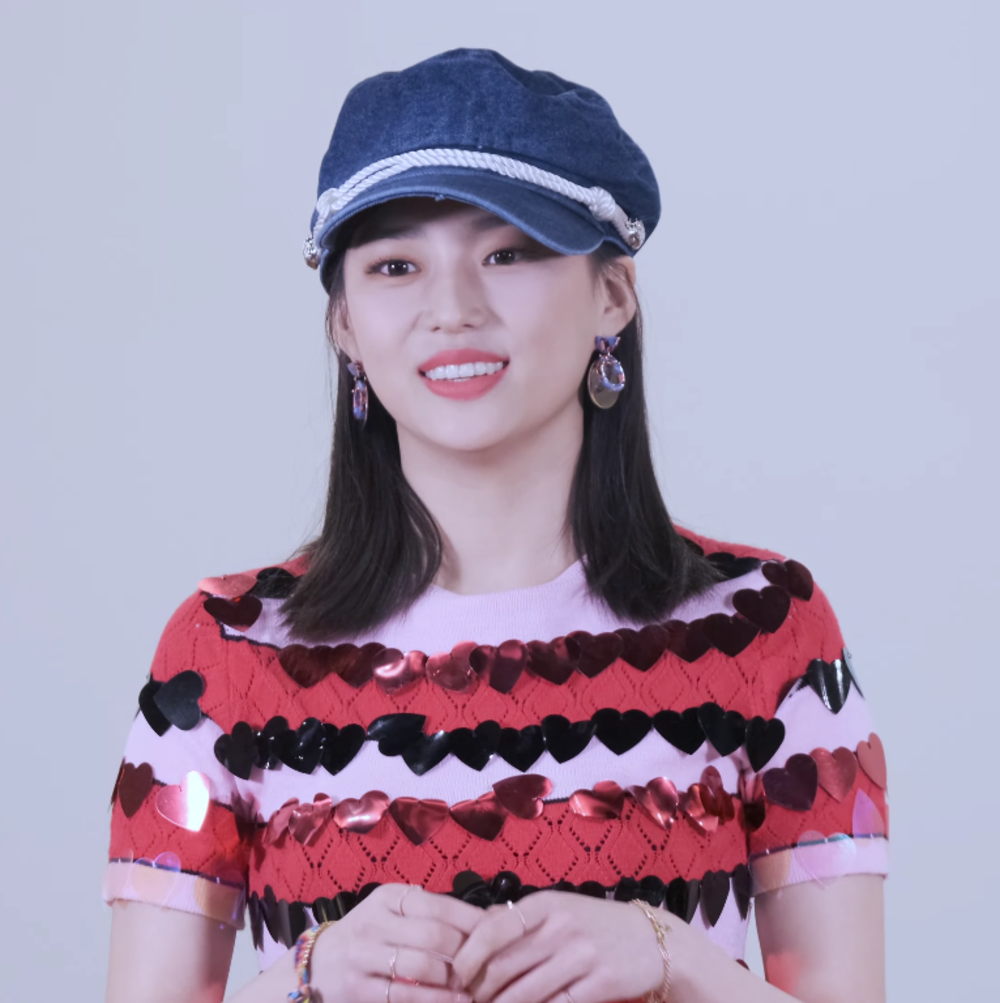
- Yeeun in December 2019
- Born: August 10, 1998 (age 27); Dongducheon, South Korea
- Education: School of Performing Arts Seoul
- Occupations: Singer; songwriter; rapper
- Years active: 2014–present
- Musical career
- Genres: K-pop; Hip hop
- Instrument: Vocals
- Labels: Cube; SuperBell; Apple Monster (Note: As a member of El7z Up only.); DG
- Member of: CLC; El7z Up
- Formerly of: United Cube
- Website: Yeeun

Korean name
- Hangul: 장예은
- Hanja: 張睿恩
- RR: Jang Yeeun
- MR: Chang Yeŭn

Jang Ye-eun (Korean: 장예은; born August 10, 1998), better known as Yeeun, is a South Korean singer, songwriter, and rapper signed to Superbell Company. She is best known as the main rapper of the South Korean girl group CLC. She was part of the longest-running pair of hosts at SBS MTV's The Show, hosting from May 2018 to November 2019, alongside Jeno of NCT Dream.

== Early life and education ==
Yeeun was born and raised in Dongducheon, Gyeonggi Province, South Korea. She has an older sister. She attended Dongbo Elementary School, Dongducheon Girls' Middle School and School of Performing Arts Seoul. She graduated from the latter in February 2017.

== Career ==
=== 2014–2021: Career beginnings and solo activities ===
In 2014, Yeeun made appearances in the music videos for "G.NA's Secret" and "Beep Beep" by G.NA and BtoB, respectively. Yeeun also participated in the former's promotional activities as a backing dancer with fellow Cube Entertainment trainees.

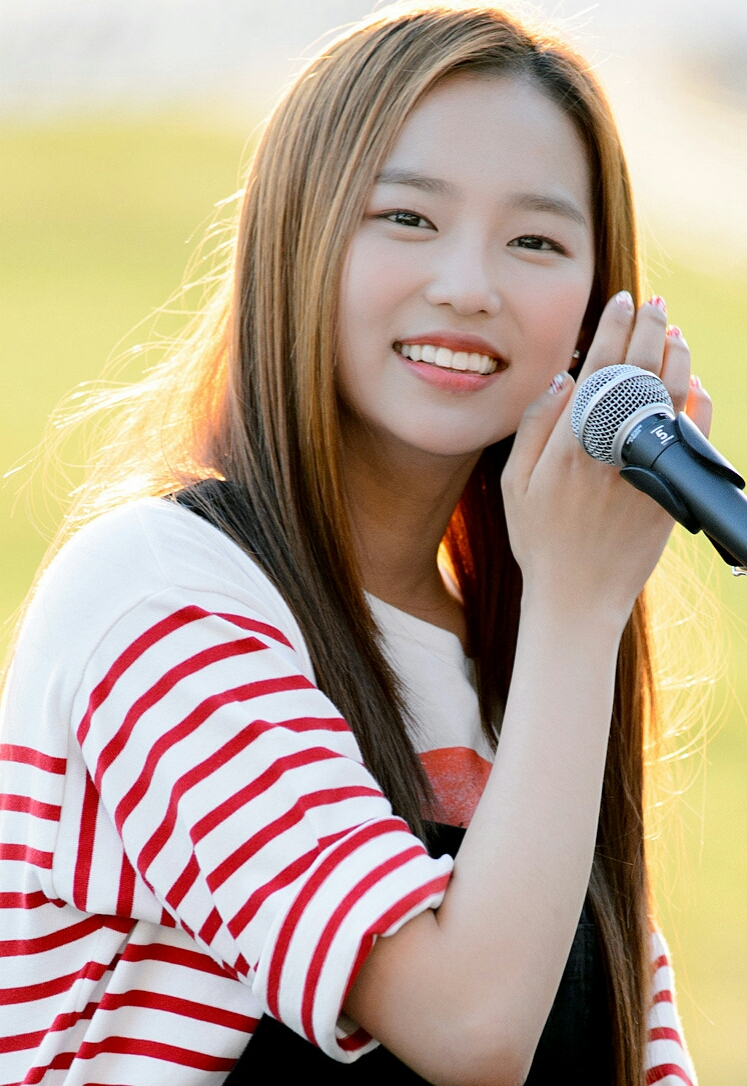
Yeeun in 2015

On March 10, 2015, Yeeun was revealed as the main rapper of the girl group CLC. The group officially debuted on March 19, 2015, with their debut single, "Pepe", from their debut EP, First Love. On June 29, Yeeun hosted BtoB's comeback showcase for Complete with Na In-woo.

On March 20, 2018, Yeeun made her runway debut for Greedilous at the 2018 F/W Hera Seoul Fashion Week, which was held at Dongdaemun Design Plaza. On May 21, SBS MTV announced that Yeeun had been selected to be host The Show starting from the 149th episode, on May 22, 2018, alongside NCT Dream's Jeno and Jin Longguo. She departed the show after the 212th episode, on November 26, 2019.

Together with fellow CLC member, Oh Seung-hee, Yeeun featured on the original soundtrack for the drama, My Fellow Citizens!, with the song "Really Bad Guy", released on April 22, 2019.

In May 2020, Yeeun joined the cast of the Mnet's music competition show, Good Girl. Yeeun had participated in a total of three songs during the show. She performed "Witch" with Hyo-yeon, Cheetah, Jamie, and Jiwoo of Kard on 6th episode. She had two solo songs, "Barbie" and "Mermaid" which were featured in the final episode. She promoted the "Barbie" on the 672nd episode of M Countdown. She later released a special solo music video for "Mermaid" on the CLC YouTube channel in the run-up to CLC's September 2020 release, Helicopter.

In June 2021, Cube Entertainment announced that Yeeun would make her acting debut with her fellow members, Oh Seung-hee and Jang Seung-yeon, in the short film anthology series, Tastes of Horror. The short film premiered at the 26th Bucheon International Fantastic Film Festival in 2022.

=== 2022–present: Departure from Cube Entertainment, solo debut and EL7ZUP ===
On March 18, 2022, Cube Entertainment announced that Yeeun would be leaving the company after choosing to not renew her contract with the company.

On August 11, SuperBell Company revealed that Yeeun had signed exclusive contract with them as a solo artist. Yeeun participated as a featured artist on the single "Nirvana Girl" by Sorn, which was released on September 15. She later featured on oceanfromtheblue's single "Come Back Home", released on November 22.

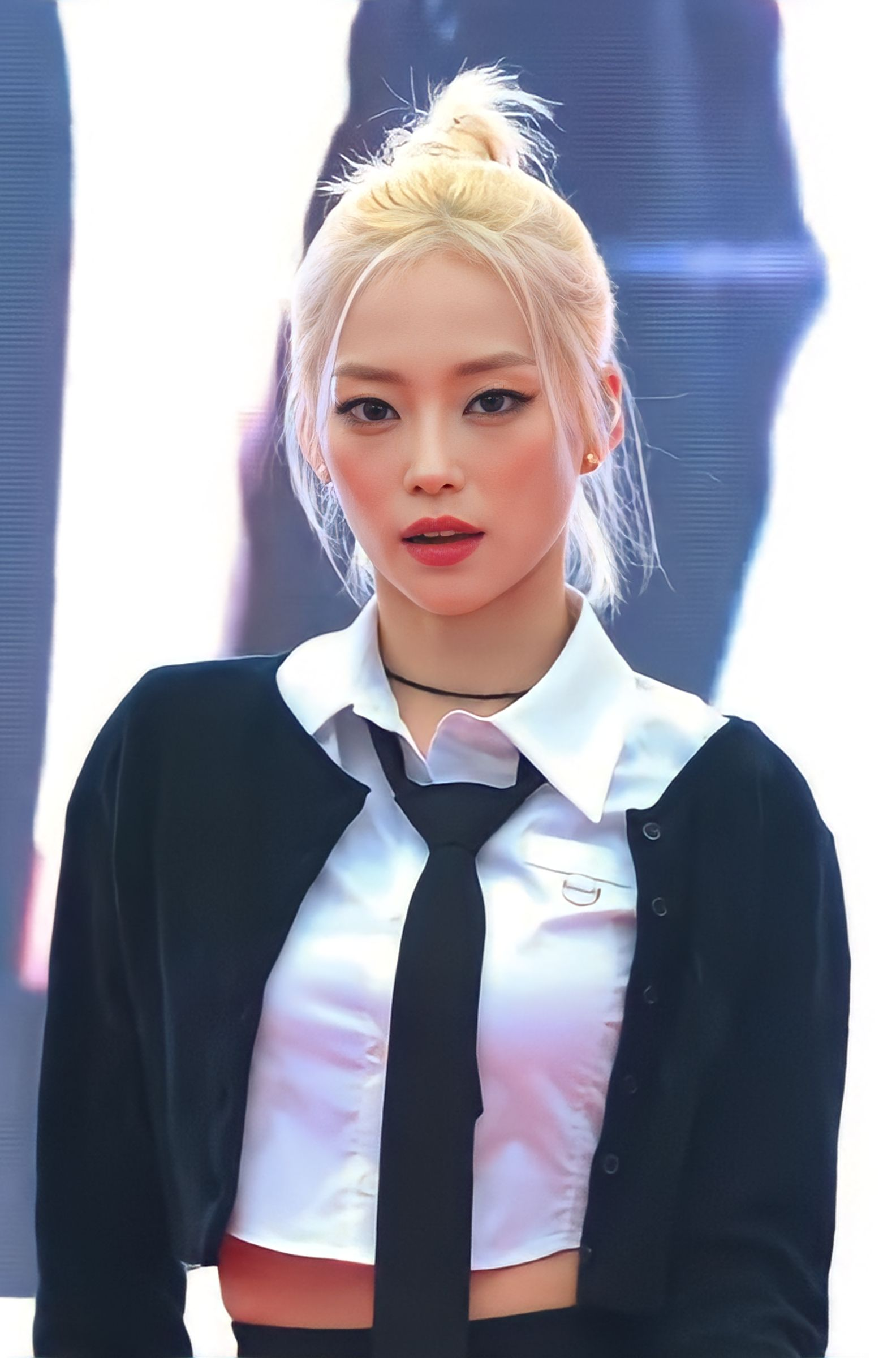
Yeeun in 2023

In March 2023, SuperBell Company announced that Yeeun would be making her solo debut on April 13, with the single album "The Beginning" and its title track "Cherry Coke". Her debut was preceded by the release of the digital single "Strange Way To Love" on March 20. On May 18, SuperBell Company confirmed Yeeun's participation in Mnet's reality competition show Queendom Puzzle after her appearance in the Pick-Cat team's special performance video which was released on the same day. On August 16, Yeeun placed 7th with a total of 350,517 points in the final episode of Queendom Puzzle, allowing her to debut with the winning group El7z Up.

On July 29, 2024, the digital single "Picky (Feat. Bang Yong-guk)" was issued as a pre-release for Yeeun's upcoming extended play.

On June 28, 2025, Yeeun held her first fan meeting, HEART STRIKE at H-STAGE in Hongdae.

== Public image ==
=== In the media ===
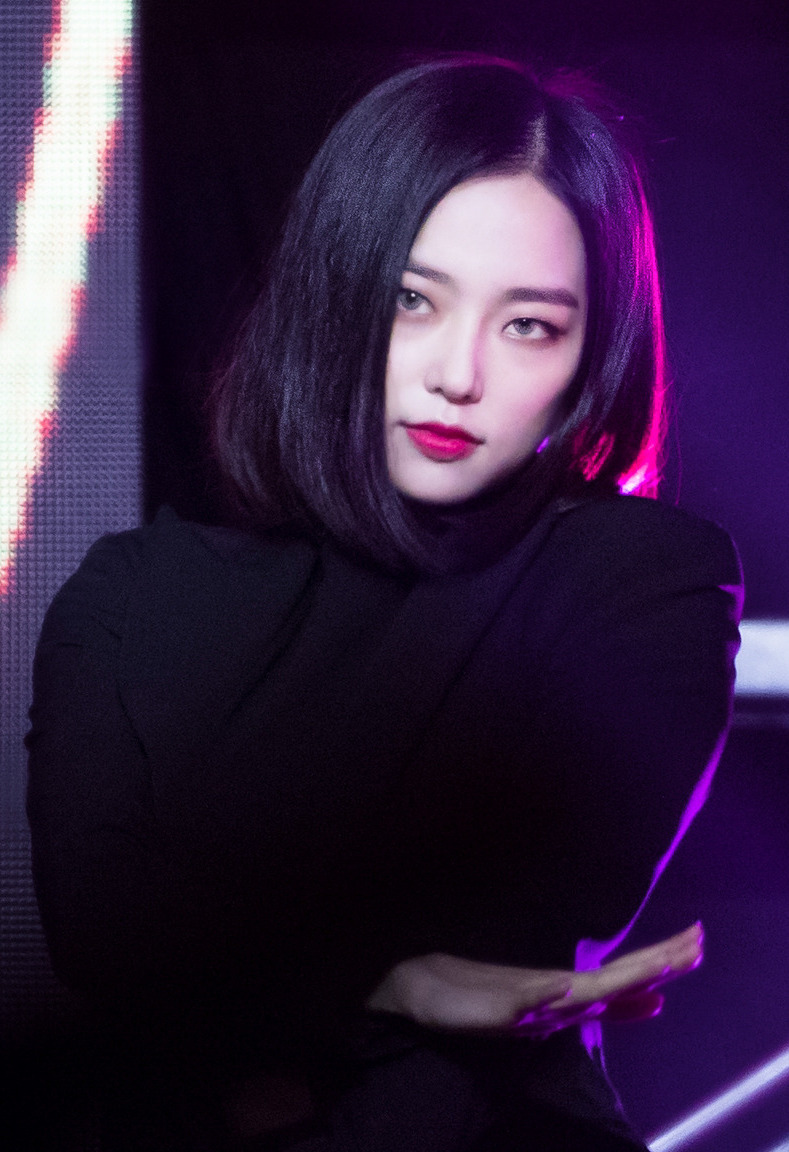
Yeeun in 2018

Yeeun is well known for having sported a bob cut during CLC promotions spanning 2018 to 2019, gaining the moniker of "단발머리 걔" (short-haired girl) in the Korean media.

=== Endorsements ===
Yeeun participated in the Spring/Summer 2016 and Fall/Winter 2016 TBJ campaigns, alongside BtoB. In August 2020, Yeeun was announced to be the brand model for Cosio's Super Glass Care Treatment line.

== Discography ==
=== Single albums ===
List of single albums, showing selected details, selected chart positions, and sales figures
| Title | Details | Peak chart positions | Sales |
| Title | Details | KOR | Sales |
|---|---|---|---|
| The Beginning | Released: April 13, 2023; Label: Superbell Company; Formats: CD, digital download, streaming | 38 | KOR: 5,137 |
| Scent of Memories | Released: May 12, 2026; Label: HiD; Formats: Digital download, streaming | – | —N/a |

=== Singles ===
| Title | Year | Peak chart positions | Album |
| Title | Year | KOR Down. | Album |
As lead artist
| "Witch" (마녀사냥) (with Hyoyeon, Jiwoo, Jamie, Cheetah) | 2020 | — | Good Girl Episode 3 |
| "Barbie" | 2020 | — | Good Girl Episode 3 |
| "Mermaid" (목소리) (featuring Rohann) | 2020 | — | Good Girl Final |
| "Strange Way to Love" | 2023 | — | The Beginning |
| "Cherry Coke" | 2023 | 141 | The Beginning |
| "Picky" (featuring Bang Yong-guk) | 2024 | 143 | Non-album single |
| "Scent of Memories" (記憶の香り) | 2026 | TBA | Scent of Memories |
As featured artist
| "Nirvana Girl" (Sorn featuring Yeeun) | 2022 | — | Non-album single |
| "Come Back Home" (oceanfromtheblue featuring Yeeun) | 2022 | — | oceanfromtheblue |
"—" denotes releases that did not chart or were not released in that region.

=== Soundtrack appearances ===
| Title | Year | Album |
|---|---|---|
| "Really Bad Guy" (오빠나빠요) (with Oh Seung-hee) | 2019 | My Fellow Citizens! OST |
| "Another Level" (with Oh Seung-hee and Chang Seung-yeon) | 2021 | Be My Boyfriend OST |

=== Guest appearances ===
List of non-single guest appearances with other performing artist(s)
| Title | Year | Other artist(s) | Album |
|---|---|---|---|
| "Mermaid" | 2018 | Lee Min-hyuk, Peniel, Jung Il-hoon, Soyeon, Wooseok | ONE |

== Songwriting credits ==
All credits are adapted from the Korea Music Copyright Association, unless stated otherwise.

List of songs, showing release year, artist name, album name, and co-writers
| Song | Year | Artist | Album | Co-writers |
|---|---|---|---|---|
| "What Planet Are You From?" (어느 별에서 왔니) | 2016 | CLC | Nu.Clear (Note: Credits taken from the "Nu.Clear" physical album.) | Son Youngjin, Jo Sungho |
| "Day By Day" | 2016 | CLC | Nu.Clear | Big Sancho, Son Youngjin, Ferdy, |
| "It's Too Late" (진작에) | 2016 | CLC | Nu.Clear | Ferdy |
| "Mistake" | 2017 | CLC | Crystyle | Big Sancho, Ferdy |
| "Meow Meow" (미유미유) | 2017 | CLC | Crystyle | Son Youngjin, Sungho |
| "I Mean That" (말이야) | 2017 | CLC | Crystyle | Son Youngjin, Kang Dongha |
| "Bae" | 2017 | CLC | Free'sm | Big Sancho, Park Haeil |
| "I Like It" (즐겨) | 2017 | CLC | Free'sm | Seo Jaewoo, Big Sancho |
| "Hold Your Hand" (잡아줄게) | 2017 | CLC | Free'sm | Son Youngjin, Kang Dongha |
| "Black Dress" | 2018 | CLC | Black Dress | Cho Sungho, Ferdy, Kang Dongha |
| "Like That | 2018 | CLC | Black Dress | Jaeri Potter, Kwon Eunbin |
| "Distance" (선) | 2018 | CLC | Black Dress | Seo Jaewoo, Cho Sungho |
| "To The Sky" | 2018 | CLC | Black Dress | Cho Sungho, Ferdy |
| "7th" (일곱번째) | 2018 | CLC | Black Dress | Cho Sungho, Kang Dongha |
| "Mermaid" | 2018 | United Cube | One | Lee Minhyuk, Jung Ilhoon, Peniel, Wooseok, Soyeon |
| "Young and One" | 2018 | United Cube | One | Hyuna, Seo Yongbae, Lee Minhyuk, Peniel, BreadBeat, E'Dawn, Wooseok, Yuto, Soyeon, Kwon Eunbin, Seo Jaewoo |
| "No" | 2019 | CLC | No.1 | Soyeon |
| "Show" | 2019 | CLC | No.1 | Dally, Seo Jaewoo (TENTEN), BreadBeat (TENTEN), June |
| "Breakdown" | 2019 | CLC | No.1 | Choi Youngkyung |
| "I Like It" | 2019 | CLC | No.1 | Kim Yeonseo, The Proof |
| "I Need U" | 2019 | CLC | No.1 | Anna Timgren, Vincenzo, Fuxxy, Any Masingga |
| "Really Bad Guy" (오빠나빠요) | 2019 | Yeeun and Seunghee (CLC) | My Fellow Citizens! OST | Kim Heewon, ZEENAN, Oh Seungeun, Jeong Daon |
| "ME"(美) | 2019 | CLC | Non-album singles | Yeah Nice, Son Youngjin, Ferdy, Jay Jay |
| "Devil" | 2019 | CLC | Non-album singles | Seo Jieum |
| "Witch" (마녀사냥) | 2020 | Yeeun with Hyoyeon, Jiwoo, Jamie, Cheetah | Good Girl Episode 3 | MEGATONE (13), Jamie, 88247, LUKE (13), SCORE (13) |
| "Helicopter" | 2020 | CLC | Helicopter | BreadBeat (TENTEN), Jo Yunkyung |
| "Helicopter" (English Ver.) | 2020 | CLC | Helicopter | BreadBeat (TENTEN), Jo Yunkyung, Melanie Joy Fontana |
| "Strange Way To Love" | 2023 | Yeeun | The Beginning | Hae Da-young |

== Videography ==
=== Music videos ===
| Title | Year | Artist(s) | Director(s) | Ref. |
|---|---|---|---|---|
| "Beep Beep" (뛰뛰빵빵) | 2014 | BtoB | Unknown | |
| "G.NA's Secret" (예쁜 속옷) | 2014 | G.NA | Unknown | |
| "Kimishika" | 2015 | Son Dong-woon | Unknown | |
| "Strange Way To Love" | 2023 | Jang Ye-eun | Unknown | |
| "Cherry Coke" | 2023 | Jang Ye-eun | Unknown | |

== Filmography ==
=== Film ===
| Year | Title | Role | Notes | Ref. |
|---|---|---|---|---|
| 2022 | Tastes of Horror: Ding Dong Challenge | Bora | Featured as part of a short film anthology series. | |

=== Television ===
| Year | Title | Role | Notes | Ref. |
|---|---|---|---|---|
| 2017 | Star News | Correspondent | Every Monday | |
| 2018–2019 | The Show | Host | With NCT Dream's Jeno | |
| 2020 | Good Girl | Contestant | | |
| 2020 | 2020 Asia Song Festival | Host | With NCT's Doyoung | |
| 2023 | Queendom Puzzle | Contestant | Spin-off of Queendom | |

=== Web shows ===
| Year | Title | Role | Notes | Ref. |
|---|---|---|---|---|
| 2018 | Yeeun's Sweet Radio | Host | January 13 – July 13 | |
| 2018 | Doom-CLC, Doodoom-CLC | Herself | Ep. 5-6 | |
| 2019 | Yeeun's Even Sweeter Radio | Host | 43 episodes, from February 5 – December 15 | |
| 2021 | Play on Challenge: Joker Wars | Panelist | | |
| 2025 | Welcome to the Forest of Tarot | Host | | |

=== Radio ===
| Year | Title | Notes | Ref. |
|---|---|---|---|
| 2019–2020 | Vibe Chart Show | Host; on-air podcast; September 2019 – February 2020 | |

== Awards and nominations ==
Name of the award ceremony, year presented, award category, nominee(s) of the award, and the result of the nomination
| Award ceremony | Year | Category | Nominee(s)/work(s) | Result | Ref. |
|---|---|---|---|---|---|
| Seoul Music Awards | 2024 | Rookie of the Year | Jang Ye-eun | Nominated | |
