= Michelle Lee (singer) =

South Korean singer (born 1991)

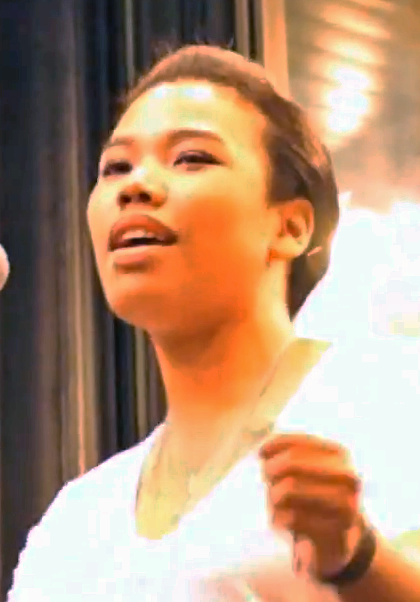
- Michelle Lee performing "I Can Sing" in September 2015
- Born: September 9, 1991 (age 34); Paju, South Korea
- Education: Dong-ah Institute of Media and Arts
- Occupations: Singer; Music instructor
- Years active: 2011 - present
- Known for: K-pop Star season 1
- Musical career
- Genres: R&B; Soul
- Label: DIMA Entertainment

Korean name
- Hangul: 이미쉘
- RR: I Miswel
- MR: I Miswel

Michelle Lee (Korean: 이미쉘; born September 9, 1991) is a South Korean singer. After successfully auditioning for K-pop Star season 1 in 2011, she was eventually signed to YG Entertainment as part of a new girl group called SuPearls. However, after two years of training, the group was suddenly disbanded before they could debut and Lee's contract was nullified.

She was signed as of 2013 to DIMA Entertainment, the affiliate agency of her alma mater, the Dong-ah Institute of Media and Arts.

== Biography ==
=== Early life ===
Michelle Lee was born September 9, 1991, in Paju, South Korea, to a Korean mother and an African-American father. She grew up in Paju with her older sister and mother, as her father returned to the United States prior to her birth following her parents' separation.

Since the age of five, Lee and her sister would listen to their mother's H.O.T. and Toni Braxton cassette tapes while trying to match their voices to the pitch of the tune, occasionally even trying to learn the dance moves. However, like fellow Black-Korean musicians Insooni and Yoon Mi-rae, Lee faced constant discrimination for her biracial identity in school. Her debut single, "Without You", centers around the bullying she suffered.

Lee admits to never having left South Korean soil, and occasionally struggles with English.

=== 2011–2012: Career beginnings, K-pop Star, and SuPearls ===
In 2011, she became a participant in the worldwide K-pop Star music audition/competition. She has been praised for her powerful voice, wide range, and mature singing skill. She gathered early praise from the 3 judges who are also representatives of SM, YG, and JYP, and was recognized as a strong contender to win the contest along with Park Ji-min.

During the group audition stages, the four-person girl group of Michelle, Park Ji-min, Lee Seung-joo, and Lee Jung-mi drew rave reviews for their renditions of Girls' Generation's "The Boys" and Irene Cara's "Fame", which resulted in all four members advancing to the next stage.

After the show, she was signed by YG Entertainment and was initially scheduled to debut as a member of the girl group Supearls along with Lee Jung Mi, Lee Seung Joo, and Lee Hi (who replaced Ji-min Park, who signed with JYP at the end of the show). For about two years, the girls underwent training at YG and performed at various small venues.

=== 2013–present: SuPearls' disbandment, joining DIMA Entertainment, and solo debut ===
On February 18, 2013, YG announced that plans for their debut had been dropped in order to focus on Lee Hi's solo career.

On March 28, 2013, it was officially reported that Lee had signed with DIMA Entertainment and would officially begin training to debut as a solo artist.

She was also featured on South Korean rapper Double K's single "Rewind" for his upcoming album. The music video and single were released on May 3, 2013.

Her debut single, "Without You", was released on March 21, 2014, by DIMA Entertainment and LOEN Entertainment. The music video features a young girl (portrayed by Egypt Yoona) writing racial slurs on a wall covered with graffiti. In some scenes, the child dabs her face with white powder in an attempt to give herself lighter skin. Upon discovering her music was posted on Melon, Lee's pent up emotions from childhood "just hit me at once and I just starting crying. I was on the phone with my older sister and we couldn't help ourselves, we just both started crying together."

=== 2015: First mini-album, I Can Sing ===
On August 4, Lee released her first mini-album, I Can Sing. The album was primarily written by her, and again was a personal message of strength to others.

=== 2016: Tribe of Hip Hop 2 ===
Lee participated in Tribe of Hip Hop 2, and her performance earned her the moniker of the Korean Missy Elliott. She is currently on SESESE House.

== Discography ==
=== Extended plays ===
Title	Album details	Peak chart positions
Title	Album details	KOR
I Can Sing	Released: August 4, 2015; Label: Sony Music; Formats: CD, digital download	96
Day By Day	Released: August 27, 2020; Label: KDM; Formats: Digital download	—

=== Singles ===
Title	Year	Peak chart positions	Sales	Album
Title	Year	KOR	Sales	Album
"Without You"	2014	85	KOR: 20,634	I Can Sing
"I Can Sing"	2015	—		I Can Sing
"Queen Z" (불이나)	2016	—		Tribe of Hip Hop 2 Special Track
"Life Is"	2018	—		Non-album single
"Day By Day"	2020	—		Day By Day
"Break the Wall"	2021	—		Non-album singles
"Baby Baby"	2021	—		Non-album singles
"Won't Talk With You"	2021	—		Non-album singles
"Don't Fxxx With You"	2021	—		Non-album singles
"Sweet Dream"	2021	—		Non-album singles
"Lost in You"	2022	—		Non-album singles
"No More Cry"	2022	—		Non-album singles

=== Other charted songs ===
Title	Year	Peak chart positions	Sales	Album
Title	Year	KOR	Sales	Album
"One Night Only"	2012	94	KOR: 49,267	K-pop Star Top 7
"Looking at the Photo" (사진을 보다가)	2012	66	KOR: 61,179	K-pop Star Top 6

== Filmography ==
=== Television ===
Date	Title	Role	Network
10/4/2011 & 4/8/2012	K-pop Star	Herself	SBS
8/11/2016 – present	Tribe of Hip Hop	Herself	JTBC
8/15/2018 – 3/13/2022 & 3/20/2022	King of Mask Singer	Herself	MBC
