= I Dream (disambiguation) =

I Dream is a 2004 British children's television comedy.

I Dream may also refer to:

- I Dream (musical), a 2010 musical by Douglas Tappin about Martin Luther King Jr.
- "I Dream", a song by Billie Piper, from the album Honey to the B (1998)
- "I Dream" (song), a song by 15&, from the album Sugar (2014)
- "I Dream", a song by Dannii Minogue, from the album Get into You (1993)
- IDream Entertainment, a Pakistani entertainment company
- IDream Tiruppur Tamizhans, a Tamil Nadu Premier League cricket team based in Tiruppur, Tamil Nadu, India
- Idream R. Murthy, Indian politician
