= Baek A-yeon =

South Korean singer (born 1993)

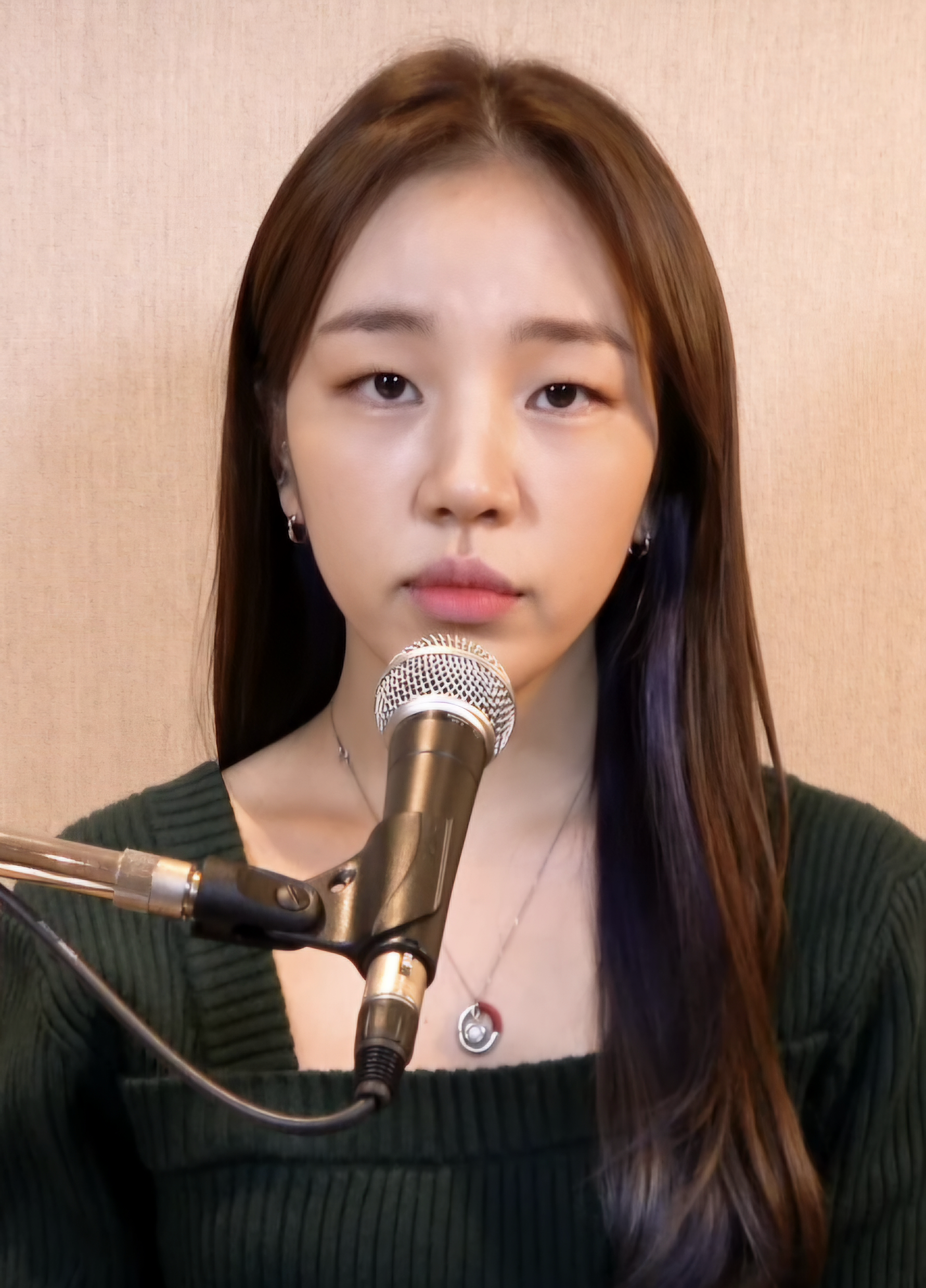
- Baek in November 2021
- Born: March 11, 1993 (age 33); Seongnam, South Korea
- Occupations: Singer; songwriter
- Spouse: Unknown (m. 2023)
- Children: 1
- Musical career
- Genres: K-pop; R&B; Soul
- Instrument: Vocals
- Years active: 2012–present
- Labels: JYP; Eden
- Formerly of: JYP Nation
- Website: edenenter.com

Korean name
- Hangul: 백아연
- RR: Baek Ayeon
- MR: Paek Ayŏn

Baek A-yeon (Korean: 백아연; born March 11, 1993) is a South Korean singer and songwriter signed under Eden Entertainment. She is best known as the second runner-up contestant in season 1 of K-pop Star. As a soloist, she has released a total of five extended plays and a total of ten singles, after her contract with JYP Entertainment expired in 2019, she subsequently joined EDEN Entertainment.

== Early life and education ==
Baek was born on March 11, 1993, in Seongnam, South Korea. During her fifth year of elementary school she underwent treatment for cancer. She is currently studying at the Department of Practical Music at Howon University.

== Career ==
=== 2011–2012: K-Pop Star ===
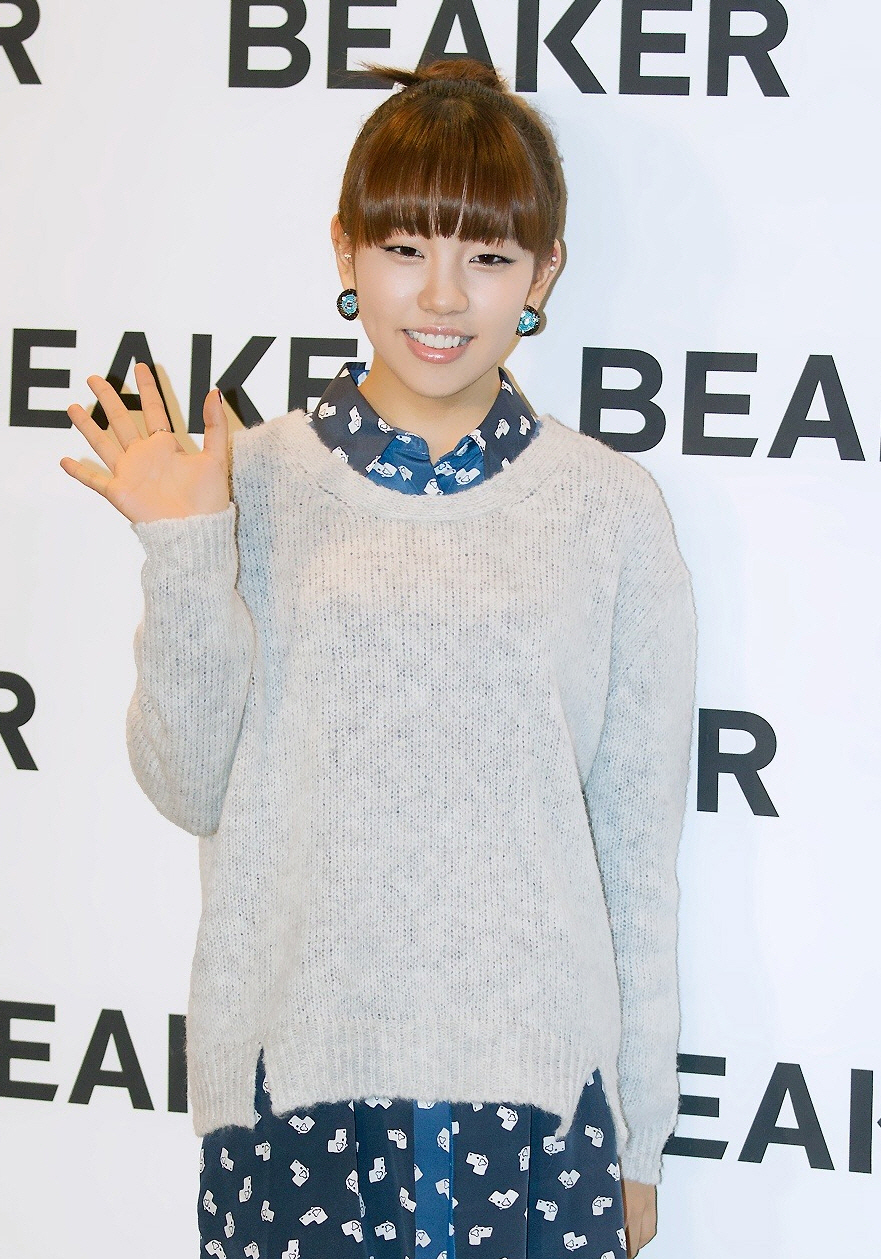
Baek in 2012

Baek participated in the first season of competition television show K-pop Star. She was one of the top three contestants, along with Park Ji-min and Lee Hi. After she was eliminated she was approached by a number of entertainment agencies seeking to sign her. Baek eventually signed with JYP Entertainment, the company of K-pop Star judge JYP.

=== 2012–2014: I'm Baek, A Good Girl and original soundtrack ===
Baek released her debut EP, I'm Baek, on September 10, 2012, with a total of five tracks including the lead single "Sad Song". On September 16, Baek made her official debut stage on the music program Inkigayo with performances of "Stay" and "Sad Song".

On December 15, Baek released her first original soundtrack "Daddy Long Legs" for the SBS drama Cheongdam-dong Alice.

In April 2013, Baek recorded "Introduction to Love," for MBC's drama When a Man Falls in Love. Baek released her second EP, A Good Girl, on June 17, 2013, with the lead single "A Good Boy". One months later, she recorded "Tears Are Also Love", for the MBC's drama Goddess of Fire OST.

In May 2014, Baek released track, "The Three Things I Have Left", for the SBS drama Angel Eyes. Two months later, she released another track, "Morning of Canon", for MBC's drama You Are My Destiny.

=== 2015–present: Breakthrough, Bittersweet, Dear Me, and Observe ===
Baek released her first single and first self-composed song, "Shouldn't Have" (featuring Day6's Young K), on May 20, 2015. The song went on to become a sleeper hit, reaching number one on several Korean music real-time charts a month after its release among fierce competition. Following the success of the song, she began promotions for it on music programs beginning with Show! Music Core on June 13. Later in the year, she contributed her vocals to the song "So We Are" for the SBS drama Yong-pal.

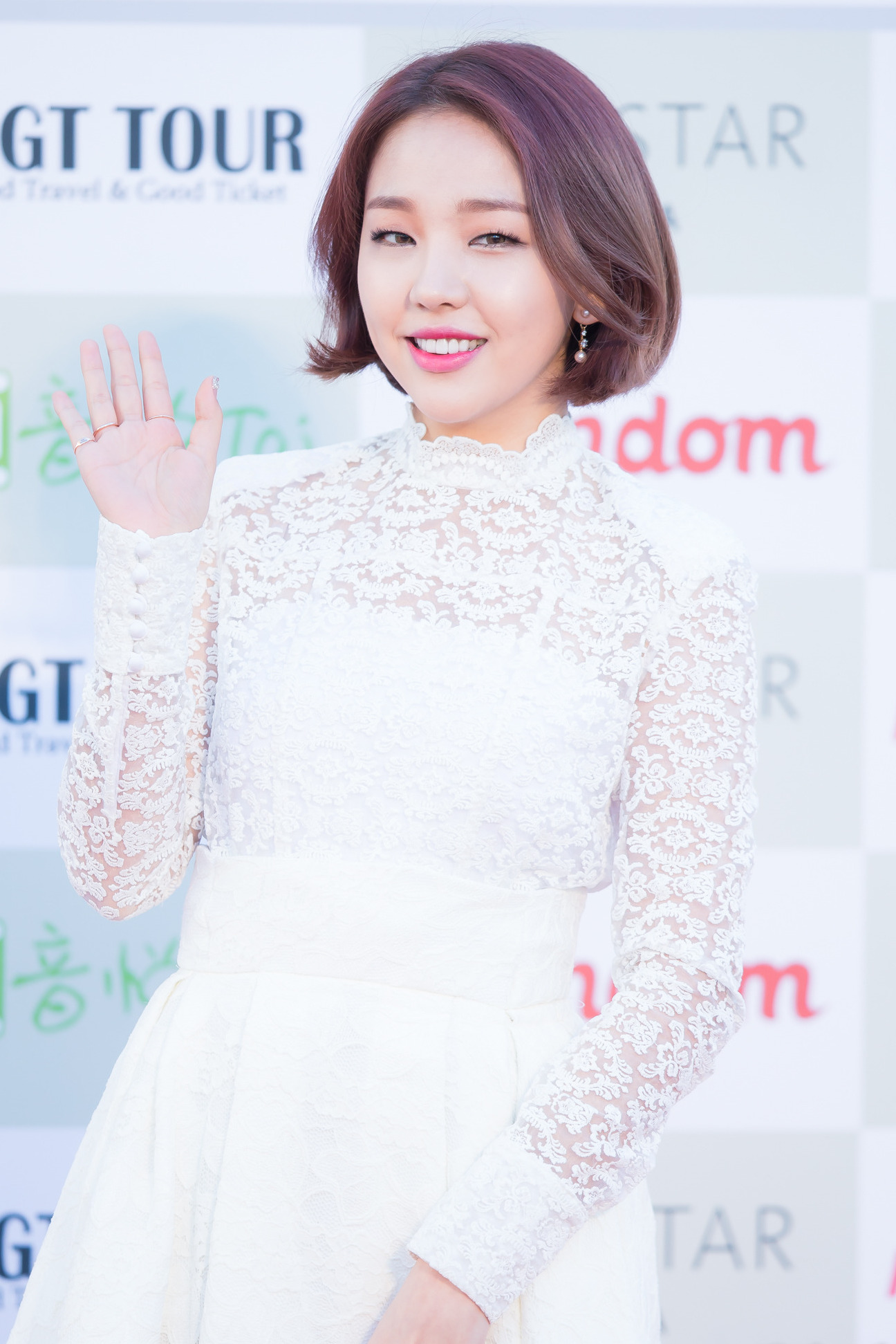
Baek in 2016

In May 2016, Baek released a digital single album, consisting of the lead track "So-So", composed and written by herself, as well as side track "Something to Say". "So-so" followed the success of "Shouldn't Have", securing the top spot on all major Korean music charts within a day of its release. Later that year, she released holiday single, "Just Because" (featuring Got7's JB), on November 30.

Baek's third EP, Bittersweet, was released on May 29, 2017, leading to the media coining the name "May Queen" for her consistency in releasing music during that month. The EP contained six tracks, with the lead single "Sweet Lies" featuring vocal trio The Barberettes. While Bittersweet did not have the same success chart-wise as its predecessors, the album was praised for its quality with Billboard including it among their top five critic's picks of the K-pop albums released that year.

"The album as a whole, is hypnotic in its pop glory, and lives up to Baek's reputation within Korea as one of the country's most captivating young female soloists. As a whole, Bittersweet features a wide array of sounds that blend to create an otherworldly listening experience." - T.H., Billboard

Baek A Yeon's fourth EP, Dear Me was released on November 21, 2018, with the lead single "Sorry To Myself" along with five other songs. Later that year, she was confirmed to have landed a role in Korea's first virtual reality (VR) musical film, "Anna, Mari", which won Korea Creative Content Agency's 2018 "VR Frontier Content Project".

On September 16, 2019, it was revealed that Baek A Yeon's contract with JYP Entertainment had come to an end. She chose not to renew her contract, and left the company. On December 7, she formally announced that she had joined Eden Entertainment.

On July 13, 2021, Baek A Yeon was supposed to release her fifth EP, Observe, with the lead single "0%", but it was delayed due to rising cases of COVID-19 in Korea. It was later announced that the new release date would be September 7.

On August 17, 2022, Baek released the track "Doctor", a track that was included in the Pokémon Exhibition Track.

On October 21, 2022, it was announced that Baek has renewed her contract with Eden Entertainment.

== Personal life ==
On February 28, 2023, Baek's agency confirmed that she is in a relationship with her non-celebrity boyfriend. On March 2, 2023, Baek announced in a handwritten letter that they will be holding their wedding ceremony. The couple married on August 12, 2023.

Baek announced her pregnancy on April 30, 2024. She gave birth to her first child, a daughter, on September 12, 2024.

== Discography ==
=== Extended plays ===
Title	EP details	Peak chart positions	Sales
Title	EP details	KOR	Sales
I'm Baek	Released: September 10, 2012; Label: JYP Entertainment; Formats: CD, digital download; Track listing: 1. "Sad Song" (느린노래); 2. "Stay" (머물러요); 3. "Love, Love, Love"; 4. "Always" (feat. Jun. K); 5. "You're Leaving" (니가 떠나간다)	11	KOR: 2,148+
A Good Girl	Released: June 17, 2013; Label: JYP Entertainment; Formats: CD, digital download; Track listing: 1. "A Good Boy"; 2. "Tell Me" (말해줘); 3. "Because of You" (너 때문에) (feat. Jia); 4. "I Love It" (맘에 들어) (feat. Baro); 5. "Like Oxygen" (산소처럼)	14	KOR: 1,765+
Bittersweet	Released: May 29, 2017; Label: JYP Entertainment; Formats: CD, digital download; Track listing: 1. "Sweet Lies" (feat. The Barberettes); 2. "Just Friends" (연락이 없으면); 3. "Jealousy" (질투가 나) (feat. Park Ji-min); 4. "Magic Girl" (마법소녀); 5. "Screw You" (넘어져라); 6. "The Last of You" (끝모습)	—	—N/a
Dear Me	Released: November 21, 2018; Label: JYP Entertainment; Formats: CD, digital download; Track listing: 1. "Sorry to Myself" (마음아 미안해); 2. "True Lies" (진짜 거짓말); 3. "Starlight"; 4. "Hug Me" (안아줘); 5. "I Wish" (말하지 않아도); 6. "Infinite Loop" (시간은 돌고 돌아서)	—	—N/a
Observe	Released: September 7, 2021; Label: Eden Entertainment, Kakao Entertainment; Formats: CD, digital download; Track listing: 1. "0%" (아무것도 하기 싫으면 어떡애); 2. "The War on Loneliness" (외로 War); 3. "Wanna Be Crooked" (베뚤어질래); 4. "Imagination" (그래서 요즘 생각이 많아); 5. "Day Dream" (환상); 6. "0%" (아무것도 하기 싫으면 어떡애) (Inst.)	—	—N/a

=== Singles ===
Title	Year	Peak chart positions		Sales (DL)	Album
Title	Year	KOR Gaon	KOR Hot 100	Sales (DL)	Album
As lead artist
"Sad Song" (느린노래)	2012	2	11	KOR: 995,710+	I'm Baek
"A Good Boy" (어굿보이)	2013	12	26	KOR: 346,987+	A Good Girl
"Shouldn't Have" (이럴거면 그러지말지) feat. Young K of DAY6	2015	1	—	KOR: 2,500,000+	Non-album singles
"So-So" (쏘쏘)	2016	1	—	KOR: 1,070,347+	Non-album singles
"Just Because" (그냥 한번) feat. JB of GOT7	2016	12	—	KOR: 185,203+	Non-album singles
"Sweet Lies" feat. The Barberettes	2017	5	—	KOR: 278,224+	Bittersweet
"The Little Match Girl" (성냥팔이 소녀) with Wendy of Red Velvet	2017	55	—	KOR: 59,483+	SM Station
"Sorry to Myself" (마음아 미안해)	2018	— (Note: "Sorry to Myself" did not enter the Gaon Digital Chart, but peaked at number 45 on the Gaon Download Chart.)	—	—N/a	Dear Me
"Looking for Love" (썸 타긴 뭘 타)	2020	47	—	—N/a	Non-album singles
"I Need You" (춥지 않게)	2020	— (Note: "I Need You" did not enter the Gaon Digital Chart, but peaked at number 134 on the Gaon Download Chart.)	—	—N/a	Non-album singles
"Fickle Person" (변덕쟁이)	2021	— (Note: "Fickle Person" did not enter the Gaon Digital Chart, but peaked at number 58 on the Gaon Download Chart.)	—	—N/a	The Late Kim Hyun Sik's 30th Anniversary Memorial Album
"0%" (아무것도 하기 싫으면 어떡애)	2021	113	—	—N/a	Observe
As featured artist
"Pursuit of Happiness" (행복을 찾아서) Yim Jae-beom feat. Baek A-yeon	2012	—	—	—N/a	TO...
"Please Come Back" (돌아와줘) Taecyeon & Chansung of 2PM feat. Baek A-yeon	2014	—	—	—N/a	Go Crazy! (Grand Edition)
"Kibuntat" (기분탓) Sleepy feat. Baek A-yeon	2015	39	—	KOR: 51,563+	F/W
Pre-debut singles
"Atlantis Princess" originally by BoA	2012	154	—	—N/a	K-Pop Star Top 8
"Can't Fight the Moonlight" originally by LeAnn Rimes	2012	100	—	KOR: 45,274+	K-Pop Star Top 7
"Saving All My Love for You" originally by Whitney Houston	2012	93	—	KOR: 46,548+	K-Pop Star Top 6
"Run Devil Run" originally by Girls' Generation	2012	55	97	KOR: 111,780+	K-Pop Star Top 5
"I Miss You" originally by Kim Bum-soo	2012	23	37	KOR: 325,867+	K-Pop Star Top 4
"Ma Boy 2" with Lee Seunghoon, originally by Electroboyz	2012	50	67	KOR: 116,457+	K-Pop Star Special No. 3
"I Was Wrong" originally by 2AM	2012	—	—	—N/a	K-Pop Star Top 3
"—" denotes release did not chart.

=== Other charted songs ===
Title	Year	Peak chart positions		Sales (DL)	Album
Title	Year	KOR Gaon	KOR Hot 100	Sales (DL)	Album
"Stay" (머물러요)	2012	37	47	KOR: 136,772+	I'm Baek
"Love, Love, Love."	2012	44	65	KOR: 81,151+	I'm Baek
"Always" feat. Jun. K of 2PM	2012	55	—	KOR: 70,219+	I'm Baek
"You're Leaving" (니가 떠나간다)	2012	59	—	KOR: 68,973+	I'm Baek
"The First Time I Met You" (너를 처음 만난 그때) with Hwang Chi-yeul	2015	49	—	KOR: 51,089+	투유 프로젝트 - 슈가맨, Pt. 4
"Something to Say" (할말)	2016	29	—	KOR: 102,393+	So-So (single)
"Screw You" (넘어져라)	2017	81	—	KOR: 34,548	"Bittersweet"
"Just Friends" (연락이 없으면)	2017	94	—	KOR: 30,231	"Bittersweet"
"Jealousy" (질투가 나) feat. Park Ji-min	2017	27	—	KOR: 71,801	"Bittersweet"
"Magic Girl" (마법소녀)	2017	—	—	KOR: 21,070	"Bittersweet"
"—" denotes release did not chart.

=== Soundtrack appearances ===
Title	Year	Peak chart positions	Sales (DL)	Album
Title	Year	KOR Gaon	Sales (DL)	Album
"Daddy Long Legs"	2012	6	KOR: 469,000+	Cheongdam-dong Alice OST
"Introduction to Love" (사랑학개론)	2013	37	KOR: 170,436+	When a Man Falls in Love OST
"Tears Are Also Love" (눈물도 사랑인 걸)	2013	—	—N/a	Goddess of Fire OST
"The Three Things I Have Left" (내게 남은 세가지)	2014	11	KOR: 232,433+	Angel Eyes OST
"Morning of Canon" (캐논의 아침)	2014	70	KOR: 79,425+	You Are My Destiny OST
"So We Are" (이렇게 우리)	2015	14	KOR: 265,169+	Yong-pal OST
"A Lot Like Love" (사랑인 듯 아닌 듯)	2016	25	KOR: 131,894+	Moon Lovers: Scarlet Heart Ryeo OST
"Was it You" (너였었니)	2018	— (Note: "Was it You" did not enter the Gaon Digital Chart, but peaked at number 93 on the Gaon Download Chart.)	—N/a	Wok of Love OST
"Why"	2018	—	—N/a	Webtoon Yeonnom (웹툰 연놈) OST
"Always Be with You" (그대여야만 해요)	2019	164	—N/a	Encounter OST
"Story of Us" (둘만의 이야기)	2019	—	—N/a	Anna, Mari OST
"Just Go"	2019	—	—N/a	Doctor John OST
"Hello My Lover"	2019	—	—N/a	Vagabond OST
"나는 니가 되고 싶어"	2020	—	—N/a	Anna, Mari OST
"Wherever" (어디라도)	2020	—	—N/a	The Spies Who Loved Me OST
"Sweet Home" (집에만 있었지)	2021	— (Note: "Sweet Home" did not enter the Gaon Digital Chart, but peaked at number 52 on the Gaon Download Chart.)	—N/a	Webtoon Bunny and Guys (바니와 오빠들) OST
"Stay with Me" (그대를 조금 더)	2021	— (Note: "Stay with Me" did not enter the Gaon Digital Chart, but peaked at number 130 on the Gaon Download Chart.)	—N/a	Monthly Magazine Home OST
"Stained" (물들이다)	2022	—	—N/a	Elsword OST
"There, There" (당신의 밤이 그만 불안하기를)	2022	—	—N/a	Love All Play OST
"—" denotes releases did not chart.

== Concerts and tours ==
=== Headlining ===
- Baek A Yeon 1st Concert "Whispering the First Story" (2015)
- Baek A Yeon 2nd Concert "Whisper, Whisper - The 2nd Story" (2016)

=== Concert participation ===
- 2014 JYP Nation ONE MIC (Seoul, Hong Kong, Tokyo and Bangkok)
- 2016 JYP Nation Mix & Match (Seoul and Tokyo)

== Filmography ==
=== Film ===
Year	Title	Role	Notes	Ref.
2019	Princess Aya	Princess Aya	animated, Korean dubbed, Officially released in 2022	
2019	Anna, Marie			

=== Variety programs ===
Year	Title	Role	Notes
2011	K-pop Star season 1	Contestant	
2015	100 People, 100 Songs	Contestant	Episode 34
2015	2015 Idol Star Athletics Ssireum Basketball Futsal Archery Championships	Participant	
2015	Sugar Man	Show Man with Hwang Chi-yeol	Remake a song 너를 처음 만난 그때 (The First Time I Met You) by Park Jun-ha
2016	Sugar Man	Show Man with Sandeul B1A4	Remake a song 선물 (Gift) by UN
2016	Duet Song Festival	Duet with Park Soon-ho	Song choice 제발 (Please) by Lee So-ra
2016	King of Mask Singer	Contestant as "I Will Back Music Box"	Episodes 83–84

=== Music video appearance ===
Year	Song title	Artist	Role
2013	"Somebody"	15&	Herself

=== Theatre ===
Year	Title	Role	Ref.
2015	Cinderella	Cinderella	
2021–2022	Theatrical Boy Radio ONAIR	DJ	

== Awards and nominations ==
Year	Award	Category	Nominated work	Result
2013	22nd Seoul Music Awards	Best New Artists	—N/a	Nominated
2015	7th MelOn Music Awards	Top 10 Artists	—N/a	Nominated
2015	7th MelOn Music Awards	Best Ballad Song	Shouldn't Have (feat. Young K of DAY6)	Won
2015	7th MelOn Music Awards	Song Of the Year	Shouldn't Have (feat. Young K of DAY6)	Nominated
2015	17th Mnet Asian Music Awards	Best Vocal Performance – Female	Shouldn't Have (feat. Young K of DAY6)	Nominated
2015	17th Mnet Asian Music Awards	Sina Weibo Global Fan's Choice – Female	—N/a	Nominated
2016	25th Seoul Music Awards	Bonsang Award	Shouldn't Have (feat. Young K of DAY6)	Nominated
2016	25th Seoul Music Awards	Popularity Award	—N/a	Nominated
2016	25th Seoul Music Awards	Hallyu Special Award	—N/a	Nominated
2016	30th Golden Disk Awards	Digital Bonsang	Shouldn't Have (feat. Young K of DAY6)	Nominated
2016	30th Golden Disk Awards	Popularity Award (Korea)	—N/a	Nominated
2016	30th Golden Disk Awards	Global Popularity Award	—N/a	Nominated
2016	5th Gaon Chart Music Awards	Discovery of the Year – Hot Trend	Shouldn't Have (feat. Young K of DAY6)	Won
2016	18th Mnet Asian Music Awards	Best Female Artist	—N/a	Nominated
2016	18th Mnet Asian Music Awards	Best Vocal Performance – Female	So-So	Nominated
2017	31st Golden Disk Awards	Digital Bonsang	So-So	Nominated
2017	31st Golden Disk Awards	Asian Choice Popularity Award	—N/a	Nominated
2017	26th Seoul Music Awards	Bonsang Award	So-So	Nominated
2017	26th Seoul Music Awards	Best Ballad Award	So-So	Won
2017	26th Seoul Music Awards	Popularity Award	—N/a	Nominated
2017	26th Seoul Music Awards	Hallyu Special Award	—N/a	Nominated
2017	6th Gaon Chart Music Awards	Song of the Year – May	So-So	Nominated
