= Helicopter (CLC song) =

2020 single by CLC

Single by CLC
- B-side: "Helicopter (English Ver.)"
- Released: September 2, 2020
- Genre: EDM
- Length: 3:43
- Label: Cube Entertainment; Kakao M
- Songwriters: Jo Yoon-kyung; Yeeun; BreadBeat (TENTEN)
- Producers: Hyuk Shin (153/Joombas); Melanie Joy Fontana; Michel "Lindgren" Schulz; Jisoo Park (153/Joombas)

CLC singles chronology
"Devil" (2019)	"Helicopter" (2020)

Music video
- "Helicopter" on YouTube

"Helicopter" is a song recorded by South Korean girl group CLC. It was released by Cube Entertainment and distributed by Kakao M on September 2, 2020. An English version of the song was released on the same day. This is the group's final song as a seven-member group overall, following member departures from Cube between 2020 and 2021, and subsequent hiatus starting June 2022.

The song is produced by Hyuk Shin of 153/Joombas Music Group, who has worked on albums with Justin Bieber and Exo; Melanie Joy Fontana, who has co-written songs for artists such as f(x), BTS, Twice and Dua Lipa; Michel "Lindgren" Schulz; and Jisoo Park, also of 153/Joombas. The song is written by Jo Yoon-kyung, CLC's Jang Ye-eun, and BreadBeat with Melanie Joy Fontana credited on the English version of the song. The song is told to be a telling of “the story of CLC” and their “autobiographical era”.

“Helicopter” is described as a song whose central theme is “curiosity about the future”. It serves as a metaphor for the group taking off anew with confidence, ready to take on any obstacles that they may encounter. In this song, CLC express the trials and tribulations they've faced in the music industry and their determination to succeed. The song is a trap pop and EDM Powerhouse song with an addictive chorus completely in English. An accompanying music video for the song was directed by Jang Jaehyeok and Lee Kyeongsoon of BIBBIDI BOBBIDI BOO and uploaded onto CLC's official YouTube channel simultaneously at the time of release.

Commercially, the song peaked at number 6 on the Billboard US World Digital Songs chart and number 87 on the Billboard K-pop Hot 100 chart. On November 6, 2020, the lyric video for the Chinese version of the song was released on CLC's Bilibili account.

== Background and release ==
On August 13, 2020, it was reported that the group will return in early September, almost a year after since "Devil" was released in September 2019. It was also revealed that the music video for the song was already filmed. On August 26, in a TV appearance on Weekly Idol, the group performed a snippet from the song.

== Commercial performance ==
On September 10, it was reported that the group sold 12,834 physical copies in its first week—a figure over 3.5 times higher than CLC's previous first-week sales record of 3,574 (set by their EP No.1, which they released in January 2019).

The song failed to enter the Gaon Digital Chart, but debuted at number 116 on the Gaon Download Chart, for the week ending September 5, 2020. The song peaked at number 6 on the US World Digital Song Sales, for the week ending September 12, becoming their sixth Top 10 single on the chart and third Top 10 in 2020, after "Me" and "Devil". It also peaked at number 87 on the K-pop Hot 100 for the week ending September 26, their first entry on the chart.

== Music and lyrics ==
"I really like the lyrics of this song because it really tells the story of CLC and also encourages the listeners to never give up on their dreams and always fight for their beliefs. I personally think that music should be more than just some beats with good melody—it should leave them with some feelings, and I think ‘HELICOPTER’ did that really well."

— Sorn about "Helicopter",

The song is composed in the key of F minor, with 155 beats per minute, and a running time of 3:45 minutes. “Helicopter” is a trap pop EDM Powerhouse song with an addictive hook that is completely in English. The song plays on the themes of curiosity and adventure by telling listeners to “fly even higher than before” on a metaphorical helicopter.

== Music video ==
An accompanying music video for "Helicopter" was uploaded on CLC's official YouTube channel on September 2, 2020, at 6:00 pm KST. It was later uploaded to the 1theK YouTube channel on September 4. The music video achieved 10 million views in YouTube in just 36 hours, making it their fastest music video to do it. It reached 20 million views in just four days. A dance practice video for the song was released on September 4. A lyric video for the English version was released on September 7. On September 19, a music video for the English version was uploaded to CLC's official YouTube channel. A lyric video for the Chinese version of "Helicopter" was released on CLC's Bilibili account on November 6.

=== Synopsis ===
The music video plays on the theme of invention with multiple references to art and historical breakthroughs in science. The music video revolves around Leonardo's aerial screw. Instead of opting for the traditional helicopter, CLC decided to go down a more artistic route and express their message through the symbolism embedded in da Vinci's groundbreaking idea. Like the aerial screw which was met with intense criticism and disappointment at first but paved the way for the modern-day helicopter, CLC lay out hope for their future success as a team. Consequently, they can be seen dancing as a group in front of a large aerial screw in their music video for “Helicopter”. Additionally, member Yujin stands in front of a pair of wings that resemble da Vinci's Ornithopter, or an Early flying machine, once again playing on themes of invention and curiosity. Images of da Vinci's Vitruvian Man and Michelangelo’s The Creation of Adam can also be seen in the background, representing the symbiotic nature of humanity and curiosity. Additionally, many of the group and individual member shots are filmed in a set of bright led lights to accompany the lyrics which are loaded with references to the sky and stars. The CLC members are clad in striking forest-green military outfits and bold black suit dresses, visually showing their strength and determination to succeed and spread their empowering message. CLC’s Jang Ye-Eun shared back in July 2020 that she submitted a PowerPoint with ideas for the visual aspects of "Helicopter" to their label Cube Entertainment.

== Track listing ==
Digital download/CD
No.	Title	Lyrics	Music	Arrangement	Length
1.	"Helicopter"	Jo Yoon-kyung; Jang Ye-eun; BreadBeat (TENTEN)	Hyuk Shin (153/Joombas); Melanie Joy Fontana; Michel "Lindgren" Schulz; Jisoo Park (153/Joombas)	Michel "Lindgren" Schulz	3:43
2.	"Helicopter" (English Ver.)	Jo Yoon-kyung; Jang Ye-eun; BreadBeat (TENTEN); Melanie Joy Fontana	Hyuk Shin (153/Joombas); Melanie Joy Fontana; Michel "Lindgren" Schulz; Jisoo Park (153/Joombas)	Michel "Lindgren" Schulz	3:45
Total length:					7:28

== Charts ==
Chart (2020)	Peak position
US World Digital Songs (Billboard)	6
K-pop Hot 100 (Billboard Korea)	87
South Korea (Gaon Download)	116
