= I Dream (song) =

Single by 15&

from the album Sugar
- Language: Korean
- Released: October 4, 2012
- Length: 4:35
- Label: JYP
- Composer: Sim Eun-ji,
- Lyricists: Sim Eun-ji; Kim Eun-soo

15& singles chronology
"I Dream" (2012)	"Somebody" (2013)

Music video
- "I Dream" on YouTube

"I Dream" is a song recorded by South Korean duo 15& for their first studio album Sugar. It was released as their debut single by JYP Entertainment on October 4, 2012.

Professional ratings
Review scores
Source	Rating
IZM	2/5 stars

== Background and release ==
K-pop Star winner Park Ji-min appeared for the first time with JYP's fellow trainee Baek Ye-rin, on September 25, 2012, a teaser video announcing the debut of 15& was released on the JYP official website. It shows Park Ji-min sitting in the warm sunshine and humming a song softly, Baek Ye-rin comes to Park Ji-min's side with a smile. The two girls hold hands in the sunshine and complete the word 'I Dream'.

== Composition ==
"I Dream" Is written by Sim Eun-ji and Kim Eun-soo and composed by Sim Eun-ji. The song is composed in the key C-sharp Minor and has 139 beats per minute and a running time of 4 minutes and 35 seconds. "I Dream" is a pop ballad song with a large-scale arrangement of instruments such as horns and flutes and a melody line that crosses two octaves.

== Promotion ==
15& held their first stage for "I Dream" on SBS' Inkigayo on October 7, 2012, MBC's Show! Music Core on October 13 and on Mnet's M Countdown on October 18, 2012.

== Charts ==
=== Weekly charts ===
Weekly chart performance for "I Dream"
Chart (2012)	Peak position
South Korea (Gaon)	6
South Korea (K-pop Hot 100)	11

=== Monthly charts ===
Monthly chart performance for "I Dream"
Chart (October 2012)	Peak position
South Korea (Gaon)	16

== Sales ==
Country	Sales
South Korea (digital)	823,170

== Release history ==
Release history for "I Dream"
Region	Date	Format	Label
Various	October 4, 2012	Digital download	JYP
