= Devil (CLC song) =

2019 single by CLC

Single by CLC
- Released: September 6, 2019
- Recorded: 2019
- Genre: Funk
- Length: 2:57
- Label: Cube Entertainment; U-Cube
- Songwriter(s): Seo Ji-eum; Jang Ye-eun
- Producer(s): Mich Hansen; Peter Wallevik; Daniel Davidsen; Lauren Aquilina; Simon Hong

CLC singles chronology
| "Me" (2019) | "Devil" (2019) | "Helicopter" (2020) |

Music video
- "Devil" on YouTube

Professional ratings
Review scores
| Source | Rating |
|---|---|
| IZM | 3/5 stars |

"Devil" is a song recorded by South Korean girl group CLC. It was released by Cube Entertainment on September 6, 2019, as a digital single.

The song is produced by Mich Hansen, who has worked on albums with Little Mix; Peter Wallevik, who has worked on songs with Katy Perry, Kylie Minogue and SuperM; Daniel Davidsen; Phil Plested, and Lauren Aquilina. The song is written by popular South Korean lyricist, Seo Ji-eum and CLC’s Jang Ye-Eun.

“Devil” is a song which warns the listeners of the devilish nature hidden beneath a person's calm demeanor. When the members refer to the “devil,” they are referring to themselves. The track mentions that each person is capable of having a devil awaken inside of them if they are treated badly enough, and it just so happens they are capable of getting revenge on them too. Musically, it is a primarily retro-inspired track and borrows from elements like doo-wop and surf rock. The bass guitar that opens “Devil” lingers for practically the entire song, joined by handclaps and jangly synth. The rap ventures into trap territory which adds a refreshing texture to the primarily retro track.

== Background ==
"Devil" is CLC's third comeback in 2019 following "No" in January and "Me" in May. CLC, who has been a subjective and imposing message since the "Black Dress" early last year, has issued a straightforward warning with youthful charisma. It a modern retro sensibility, contains a final warning that will no longer endure a rude opponent. Member Jang Ye-eun participated and completed the song. In particular, the powerful and youthful choreography was choreographed by Star System.

== Release and promotion ==
On August 28, it was revealed that CLC would come back on September 6 with their second digital single this year, Devil. Lyrics spoiler was released from August 30 to September 1. Concept images were released on September 2 and 3, and music video teasers were released the next day.

The song was released through several music portals, including MelOn, iTunes, and Spotify.

== Commercial performance ==
The song peaked at number 7 on the US World Digital Songs chart, after selling 1,000 copies, five months after the official release. It was attributed to the late addition of the song to U.S. digital platforms until late February 2020.

== Music video ==
A music video was released alongside the single on September 6. In this music video, the members are beautifully harassing each other using spooky props with the direct warning given by the lyrics. It also adds elements to the atmosphere with colorful costumes that showcase each individual's personality and intense black costumes.

== Charts ==
| Chart (2020) | Peak position |
|---|---|
| US World Digital Songs (Billboard) | 7 |
| South Korea (Gaon Download) | 154 |

== Accolades ==
Year-end lists
| Critic/Publication | List | Rank | Ref. |
|---|---|---|---|
| BuzzFeed | The 30 Best K-pop Music Videos of The Year | 25 | |

== Release history ==
| Region | Date | Format | Label |
|---|---|---|---|
| Various | September 6, 2019 | Digital download, streaming | Cube Entertainment, U Cube |
