= Yunhway =

South Korean rapper (born 1995)

Yunhway 윤훼이
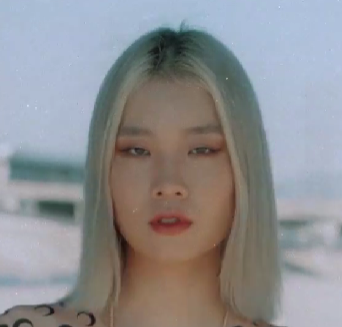
- Yunhway in 2020

Background information
- Born: Yang Yun-hwa; April 6, 1995 (age 31)
- Genre: Hip hop
- Occupation: Rapper
- Years active: 2015–present
- Label: Independent

Yang Yun-hwa (Korean: 양윤화; born April 6, 1995), known professionally as Yunhway (Korean: 윤훼이), is a South Korean rapper. She garnered attention when she appeared on Show Me the Money 8 in 2019.

== Early life ==
Yang was born in South Korea. She moved to Vanuatu when she was 9 and lived there for 4 years. She spent her teenage years in the United States and went to college there.

Her stage name "Yunhway" is a combination of her given name "Yunhwa" and "y" of her family name Yang.

== Career ==
In 2015, Yunhway released her debut single "Fatal Love". In 2019, she appeared on Show Me the Money 8 and signed to Wedaplugg Records. In 2020, she appeared on Good Girl. In 2023, she released her debut studio album Yunhway.

== Discography ==
=== EP ===
Title	Details	Peak chart position
Title	Details	KOR
Instant	Released: October 21, 2019; Label: Wedaplugg; Format: Streaming	—
Mango	Released: June 25, 2021; Label: Wedaplugg; Format: CD, Streaming	99
"—" denotes releases that did not chart or were not released in that region.

== Filmography ==
=== TV ===
Year	Title	Role
2019	Show Me the Money 8	Contestant
2020	Good Girl	Contestant

== Awards and nominations ==
Award	Year	Nominee	Category	Result	Ref.
Korean Hip-hop Awards	2020	"119 Remix"	Collaboration of the Year	Nominated	
