= K-pop Star season 1 =

K-pop Star
- Season 1
- Hosted by: Yoon Do-hyun; Boom
- Judges: BoA; Park Jin-young; Yang Hyun-suk
- Winner: Park Ji-min
- Runner-up: Lee Ha Yi

Release
- Original network: SBS
- Original release: December 18, 2011 – April 29, 2012

Season chronology
- Next → K-pop Star 2

The first season of Survival Audition K-pop Star (Korean: 서바이벌 오디션 K팝 스타) premiered on December 4, 2011, airing every Sunday evening at 6:30 pm under the Good Sunday programming block on SBS, until April 29, 2012. The first winner was Park Ji-min, who chose to sign with JYP Entertainment.

The three judges for this season were Yang Hyun-suk, founder of YG Entertainment and former member of the popular South Korean act Seo Taiji & Boys, Park Jin-young, singer/songwriter and founder of JYP Entertainment, and Korean pop icon BoA, from SM Entertainment.

Singer, Yoon Do-hyun, and entertainer, Boom, hosted the live competition from March 4, 2012 to April 29, 2012 when the winner is crowned. Yoon Do-hyun has also been narrating through the entire process.

Contestants from the Top 10 of Season 1 returned for a special Dream Stage - Best of the Best episode on April 14, 2013, competing with contestants of Season 2 for the title of Overall Champion.

== Process ==
Audition applications + Preliminary auditions held July – October 2011. Preliminary auditions were held in countries such as China, United States, Brazil and in Europe.
First round: Talent Audition – Check for talents and skills, Airdate: December 4–18, 2011.
Second round: Contact Audition and Ranking Audition – Audition and help with a chosen judge, and ranking by judges. Airdate: December 18, 2011 – January 1, 2012.
Third round: Casting Audition – Being cast by one of three companies for a two-week training session, Airdate: January 8 – February 5, 2012.
Fourth round: Battle Audition – Competing for a spot in the Top 10 to advance to the live competition, Airdate: February 12–26, 2012.
Fifth round: Stage Audition – Judges score and viewers voting during live competition to decide the final winner. Airdate: March 4 – April 29, 2012.

== Judges ==
- Yang Hyun-suk : YG Entertainment CEO, producer, singer
- Park Jin-young : JYP Entertainment Executive producer, singer, songwriter
- BoA : SM Entertainment singer, songwriter, dancer, record producer

== Top 10 ==
- Park Ji-min : Born 1997, from Daejeon, Winner, debuted in duo 15& under JYP Entertainment, now under Warner Music Korea as Jamie
- Lee Ha-yi : Born 1996, from Bucheon, Runner-up, debuted as soloist LEE HI under YG Entertainment but left in 2019, now under AOMG
- Baek A-yeon : Born 1993, from Seongnam, eliminated April 22, 2012 (8th Live), debuted as soloist under JYP Entertainment, currently under Eden Entertainment
- Lee Seung-hoon : Born 1992, from Busan, eliminated April 15, 2012 (7th Live), debuted in boy group WINNER under YG Entertainment
- Lee Michelle : Born 1991, from Paju, eliminated April 8, 2012 (6th Live), debuted as a soloist under DIMA Entertainment
- Park Jae-hyung : Born 1992, from United States, eliminated April 1, 2012 (5th Live), debuted in band DAY6 under JYP Entertainment
- Yoon Hyun-sang : Born 1994, from Suwon, eliminated March 25, 2012 (4th Live), debuted as soloist under LOEN Entertainment
- Baek Ji-woong : Born 1990, from Seoul, eliminated March 18, 2012 (3rd Live), debuted as a soloist under Bob Film Entertainment
- Kim Na-yoon : Born 1994, from United States, eliminated March 11, 2012 (2nd Live), signed with Starship Entertainment and left to pursue her bachelor's degree at Boston University
- Lee Jung-mi : Born 1996, from Ilsan, eliminated March 4, 2012 (1st Live), had been signed but cancelled her contract with YG Entertainment

== Round 5: Stage Auditions ==
- The Top 10 competes on the live stage with the results determined by combining the Judges Score 60%, Viewers SMS Vote 30%, and Advance Online Vote 10%.

Order of Performance	Name	Song - Original Artist	Advance Online Vote	SM	YG	JYP	Results
Episode 14 (March 4) : Mission 1. My Story
1	Baek Ji-woong	입영열차 안에서 - Kim Min-woo	9th	85	81	80	Top 9
2	Lee Michelle	이별여행 - Won Mi-yeon	7th	89	90	85	Top 9
3	Lee Seunghoon	난 알아요 - Seo Tai-ji & Boys	2nd	80	78	77	Top 9
4	Park Jae-hyung	한여름 밤의 꿈 - Kwon Sung-yeon	6th	83	78	83	Top 9
5	Baek A-yeon	언젠가는 - Lee Sang-eun	4th	90	90	88	Top 9
6	Kim Na-yoon	나는 문제없어 - Hwang Kyu-young	10th	83	85	83	Top 9
7	Yoon Hyun-sang	1994년 어느 늦은 밤 - Jang Hye-jin	8th	85	90	82	Top 9
8	Lee Jung-mi	달팽이 - Panic	5th	81	81	80	Eliminated
9	Lee Ha-yi	미련 - Kim Gun-mo	1st	84	82	85	Top 9
10	Park Ji-min	Hey Hey Hey - Jaurim	3rd	93	92	85	Top 9
Episode 15 (March 11) : Mission 2. Million Seller
1	Park Jae-hyung	Toxic - Britney Spears	6th	93	88	82	Top 8
2	Kim Na-yoon	Set Fire to the Rain - Adele	9th	75	78	78	Eliminated
3	Baek Ji-woong	빗속에서 - Lee Moon-sae	8th	89	85	87	Top 8
4	Lee Michelle	Run To You - Whitney Houston	7th	89	88	84	Top 8
5	Baek A-yeon	아시나요 - Jo Sung-mo	4th	92	92	92	Top 8
6	Yoon Hyun-sang	휘파람 - Lee Moon-sae	5th	86	85	82	Top 8
7	Park Ji-min	I Have Nothing - Whitney Houston	2nd	96	90	86	Top 8
8	Lee Seunghoon	단발머리 - Jo Yong-pil	3rd	82	80	88	Top 8
9	Lee Ha-yi	Sweet Love - Anita Baker	1st	93	90	88	Top 8
Episode 16 (March 18) : Mission 3. My Idol's Song
1	Park Ji-min	In Dreams (꿈에) - Park Jung-hyun	2nd	92	92	90	Top 7
2	Yoon Hyun-sang	소녀시대 - Lee Seung-chul	7th	92	92	84	Top 7
3	Lee Michelle	If I Were a Boy - Beyoncé	5th	93	90	89	Top 7
4	Lee Seunghoon	내가 노래를 못해도 - SE7EN	4th	78	77	80	Top 7
5	Park Jae-hyung	This Love - Maroon 5	6th	90	80	92	Top 7
6	Lee Ha-yi	Don't Stop The Music - Rihanna	1st	91	88	88	Top 7
7	Baek Ji-woong	기억의 습작 - Exhibition	8th	79	80	80	Eliminated
8	Baek A-yeon	[[Atlantis Princess|Atlantis Princess (아틀란티스 소녀)]] - BoA	3rd	90	88	82	Top 7
Episode 17 (March 25) : Mission 4. Movie·Drama O.S.T
1	Lee Michelle	One Night Only - Jennifer Hudson (Movie 'Dreamgirls' O.S.T)	7th	93	95	88	SM Casting
2	Park Jae-hyung	That Thing You Do - The Wonders (Movie 'That Thing You Do' O.S.T)	5th	88	88	84	JYP Casting
3	Lee Ha-yi	미련한 사랑 - JK Kim Dong-wook (Drama 'Man in Crisis' O.S.T)	1st	89	84	89	SM Casting
4	Baek A-yeon	Can't Fight the Moonlight - LeAnn Rimes (Movie 'Coyote Ugly' O.S.T)	4th	85	82	88	JYP Casting
5	Yoon Hyun-sang	바람이 분다 - Lee So-ra (Movie 'This Charming Girl' O.S.T)	6th	82	80	83	Eliminated
6	Lee Seunghoon	춤추는 사자 - Self Written Rap (Movie 'Madagascar: Escape 2 Africa' O.S.T) [Original Song: I Like to Move It - will.i.am]	3rd	88	90	89	YG Casting
7	Park Ji-min	Over The Rainbow - Judy Garland (Movie 'The Wizard of Oz' O.S.T)	2nd	100	100	99	YG Casting
Episode 18 (April 1) : Mission 5. Judge's Designated Song
1	Lee Ha-yi	Sway - Pussycat Dolls	1st	92	90	89	JYP Casting
2	Lee Michelle	사진을 보다가 - Vibe	6th	92	90	91	JYP Casting
3	Park Jae-hyung	Can't Take My Eyes Off You - Frankie Valli	4th	89	88	92	Eliminated
4	Baek A-yeon	Saving All My Love For You - Whitney Houston	5th	90	88	93	SM Casting
5	Lee Seunghoon	어머니의 된장국 - Dynamic Duo	3rd	91	92	93	YG Casting
6	Park Ji-min	I'll Be There - The Jackson 5	2nd	92	92	92	YG Casting
Episode 19 (April 8) : Mission 6. Viewer's Requested Song
1	Lee Michelle	U Just - Soulciety	5th	90	90	90	Eliminated
2	Park Ji-min	거위의 꿈 - Carnival	2nd	91	93	93	SM Casting
3	Baek A-yeon	Run Devil Run - Girls' Generation	4th	93	94	93	JYP Casting
4	Lee Seunghoon	챔피언 - PSY	3rd	88	90	88	JYP Casting
5	Lee Ha-yi	Love - Keyshia Cole	1st	93	93	93	YG Casting
Episode 20 (April 15) : Mission 7. Results of the Three Final Trainings
1	Baek A-yeon	보고싶다 - Kim Bum-soo	3rd	98	96	96	Top 3
2	Park Ji-min	Love On Top - Beyoncé	2nd	95	97	91	Top 3
3	Lee Ha-yi	시간이 흐른 뒤 - T (Yoon Mi-rae)	1st	95	97	92	Top 3
4	Lee Seunghoon	The Show Must Go On - Self Written Rap [Original: Successful (feat. Trey Songz & Lil Wayne) - Drake]	4th	87	87	86	Eliminated
Episode 21 (April 22) : Mission 8. Free Song Choice
1	Lee Ha-yi	U-Go-Girl - Lee Hyo-ri	1st	99	99	92	Top 2
2	Park Ji-min	You Raise Me Up - Secret Garden	2nd	99	97	92	Top 2
3	Baek A-yeon	잘못했어 - 2AM	3rd	95	90	92	Eliminated
Episode 22 (April 29) : Mission 9. FINAL
Mission 9-1. Free Song Choice
1	Lee Ha-yi	Killing Me Softly with His Song - Roberta Flack	2nd	98	99	94	-
2	Park Ji-min	Music Is My Life - Lim Jeong-hee	1st	98	99	95	-
Mission 9-2. Sing Each Other's Cover
1	Lee Ha Yi	Rolling in the Deep - Adele	1st	100	99	96	Runner-up
2	Park Ji-min	Mercy - Duffy	1st	99	97	99	Winner

== Ratings ==
In the ratings below, the highest rating for the show will in be red, and the lowest rating for the show will be in blue. (Note: Individual corner ratings do not include commercial time, which regular ratings include.)

Episode #	Original Airdate	AGB Ratings Nationwide
1	December 4, 2011	9.3%
2	December 11, 2011	10.7%
3	December 18, 2011	10.0%
4	December 25, 2011	10.4%
5	January 1, 2012	9.5%
6	January 8, 2012	11.5%
7	January 15, 2012	12.5%
8	January 22, 2012	10.3%
9	January 29, 2012	13.1%
10	February 5, 2012	15.0%
11	February 12, 2012	14.0%
12	February 19, 2012	17.3%
13	February 26, 2012	17.1%
14	March 4, 2012	16.2%
15	March 11, 2012	16.4%
16	March 18, 2012	15.8%
17	March 25, 2012	16.0%
18	April 1, 2012	19.5%
19	April 8, 2012	16.6%
20	April 15, 2012	15.4%
21	April 22, 2012	19.1%
22	April 29, 2012	17.6%
