= Yoon Hyun-sang =

South Korean musician (born 1994)

- Born: January 14, 1994 (age 32); South Korea
- Genres: K-pop, R&B
- Occupations: Singer, songwriter, keyboardist
- Years active: 2012-present
- Labels: Mun Hwa In (Kakao M)

Korean name
- Hangul: 윤현상
- Hanja: 尹賢尚
- RR: Yun Hyeonsang
- MR: Yun Hyŏnsang

Yoon Hyun-sang (Korean: 윤현상; born January 14, 1994) is a South Korean singer and songwriter. He is known for the placing in the top 7 of SBS's K-pop Star season 1. He released his debut album, Pianoforte, on October 31, 2014, collaborating with his labelmate IU for his debut song, "When Would It Be".

== Discography ==
=== Extended plays ===
Title	Album details	Peak chart positions
Title	Album details	KOR
Pianoforte	Released: October 31, 2014; Label: Kakao Entertainment; Formats: CD, digital download	26
Wave (파랑)	Released: March 13, 2015; Label: Kakao Entertainment; Formats: CD, digital download	30
Attitude	Released: September 14, 2017; Label: Mun Hwa In; Formats: CD, digital download	44
Lover	Released: June 26, 2019; Label: Mun Hwa In; Formats: CD, digital download	—

=== Singles ===
Title	Year	Peak chart positions	Album
Title	Year	KOR	Album
"When Would It Be" (언제쯤이면) (with IU)	2014	9	Pianoforte
"Time Forgets" (잊는다는 게)	2015	40	Wave
"Let's Eat Together" (밥 한 끼 해요) (feat. Yoon Bo-mi of Apink)	2015	61	Non-album singles
"On the Way to Love" (뭔가 될 것 같은 날) (with Lim Seul-ong)	2016	31	Non-album singles
"Silhouette" (실루엣)	2017	—	Attitude
"Spring Fever" (춘곤 (春困))	2018	—	Non-album singles
"My Memory Warehouse" (기억의 창고)	2018	—	Non-album singles
"Sad But Pretending I'm Not" (애이불비 (愛易不非))	2019	— (Note: "Sad But Pretending I'm Not" did not enter the Circle Digital Chart, but it peaked at number 31 on the component BGM Chart.)	Non-album singles
"Dancing Universe" (춤추는 우주)	2019	—	Lover
"From Today" (오늘부터)	2020	—	Mild (digital single)
"Fallin'"	2021	—	Modern, Mild (digital single)
"Falling Flowers on the Flowing Water" (낙화유수)	2022	—	Saebyeok.Uhgui (digital single)
"Letting Go" (감정이 다 무뎌져 가는 밤)	2022	—	Saebyeok.Uhgui (digital single)
"Complicated" (복잡해)	2024	—	i.E (digital single)
"Someone I Think About Sometimes" (가끔 생각나는 사람)	2024	— (Note: "Someone I Think About Sometimes" did not enter the Circle Digital Chart, but it peaked at number 41 on the component BGM Chart.)	Non-album single

=== Soundtrack appearances ===
Title	Year	Peak chart positions	Album
Title	Year	KOR	Album
"Girls' Generation" / "Part-Time Lover" (Sampling)	2012	—	SBS K-Pop Star Top 8
"No One Can Do a Farewell" (이별 참 못할 짓이더라)	2012	38	SBS K-Pop Star Special No.1
"Embrace" (품)	2015	62	Hyde Jekyll, Me OST
"Here, Take My Heart" (자, 여기 내 심장) (with Lucia)	2016	—	Fantastic OST
"A Step Closer" (더, 다가가 한걸음)	2017	—	Sing For You OST
"If You're With Me" (같진 않을까)	2019	—	Legal High OST

== Filmography ==
=== Television ===
Date	Title	Role	Note
2011–2012	K-pop Star season 1	Himself	
2015	You Hee-yeol's Sketchbook	Himself	Episode 266
