= Good Girl (TV program) =

2020 South Korean television series

- Promotional poster
- Also known as: Good Girl: Who Robbed The Station
- Genre: Reality
- Presented by: DinDin
- Starring: Ailee; Cheetah; Hyoyeon; Jamie; Jiwoo; Lee Young-ji; Queen Wasabii; Sleeq; Yeeun; Yunhway
- Country of origin: South Korea
- Original language: Korean
- No. of seasons: 1
- No. of episodes: 8

Production
- Producer: Choi Yu-jin
- Production location: South Korea

Original release
- Network: Mnet
- Release: May 14 – July 2, 2020

Good Girl (Korean: 굿걸 : 누가 방송국을 털었나) was a K-pop music competition television program that aired on Mnet from May 2020 to July 2020 in South Korea.

== Cast ==
- Ailee, a South Korean-American singer–songwriter under A2Z Entertainment. Based in South Korea, she debuted on February 8, 2012
- Cheetah, a South Korean rapper under MLD Entertainment. Formerly part of various duos, now solo.
- Hyoyeon, a South Korean singer-songwriter, rapper, and DJ under SM Entertainment. She is a member of the girl group Girls' Generation, its second sub-unit Girls' Generation-Oh!GG and the female unit GOT the beat.
- Jamie, a South Korean singer-songwriter and TV host.
- Jeon Ji-woo, the youngest member of the co-ed South Korean group Kard.
- Lee Young-ji, a South Korean rapper and singer who debuted under Mainstream in 2019.
- Queen Wasabii, (stylized Queen Wa$abii), born Kim So-hee (김소희) is a South Korean singer/rapper who debuted independently in 2019.
- Sleeq, a solo/independent South Koreanrapper who debuted in 2013.
- Jang Ye-eun, best known as the main rapper of the disbanded South Korean girl group CLC.
- Yunhway, born Yang Yoon-hwa (양윤화) is a South Korean singer and rapper who debuted independently in 2015.

== Overview ==
A mix of well-known and up-and-coming independent female hip-hop and R&B artists of South Korea gather to compete as a team against other South Korean musicians to win a cash prize.

== Discography ==
=== Good Girl Episode 1 ===
Released on June 5, 2020
No.	Title	Lyrics	Music	Artist	Length
1.	"Colors"	Yunhway, Jamie, Sleeq, 13	Score (13), Megatone (13), Luke (13), Yunhway, Jamie, Sleeq	Yunhway, Jamie, Sleeq	3:26
2.	"Demons"	Jhnovr, Lil Tachi	Saewoo, Jhnovr	Jhnovr, Lil Tachi	3:28
3.	"I Am Lee Young Ji" (나는 이영지)	Lee Young-ji, The Quiett	VEN	Lee Young-ji	3:03
4.	"Turl" (털어)	Cheetah	Park Woo-sang	Hyoyeon, Cheetah	3:14
5.	"Work!" (오늘도)	Han Yo-han, Swings	Minit, Airair, Han Yo-han	Han Yo-han, Swings	2:58
Total length:					16:06

=== Good Girl Episode 2 ===
Released on June 12, 2020
No.	Title	Lyrics	Music	Artist	Length
1.	"Don't Cry For Me"	Sleeq, Ailee, EastWest (1by1), Yoske, Knob	EastWest (1by1), Yoske, Yeul (1by1)	Ailee, Sleeq	3:48
2.	"Gray Zone (feat. Chillin Homie)"	Ravi, Chillin Homie	Ravi, Quizquiz, Chillin Homie	Ravi	2:54
3.	"Native Booty (feat. Takuwa)" (신토Booty)	Queen Wasabii, Takuwa	Savage House Gang	Queen Wasabii	2:48
4.	"One More Night"	Yunhway	Mirror Boy (220Volt), Yunhway	Yunhway	2:45
5.	"9Lives"	Hayley Aitken, Olof Lindskog, Gavin Jones	Hayley Aitken, Olof Lindskog, Gavin Jones, 72	Hyolyn	3:23
Total length:					15:34

=== Good Girl Episode 3 ===
Released on June 19, 2020
No.	Title	Lyrics	Music	Artist	Length
1.	"Witch" (마녀사냥)	88247 (13), Score (13), Megatone (13), Yeeun, Jamie, Jiwoo, Cheetah	Minit, 88247 (13), Score (13), Megatone (13), Luke (13), Jamie	Yeeun, Jiwoo, Jamie, Cheetah, Hyoyeon	3:54
2.	"Money Serenade (feat. Wonstein, Kim Seung-min)" (머니 세레나데)	Mommy Son, Wonstein, Kim Seung-min	O!ntment, Wonstein	Mommy Son	3:40
3.	"Barbie"	Score (13), Megatone (13), 88247 (13)	Score (13), Megatone (13), 88247 (13)	Yeeun	3:32
Total length:					11:05

=== Good Girl Episode 4 ===
Released on June 26, 2020
No.	Title	Lyrics	Music	Artist	Length
1.	"That's My Girl !!!" (댓츠마걸 !!!)	Yunhway, Lee Young-ji	Saewoo	Yunhway, Lee Young-ji	3:25
2.	"We won" (이겨 우리가 어차피)	Nafla, Loopy	Savage House Gang, Nafla, Loopy	Nafla, Loopy	3:00
3.	"Knife" (썰어)	Hangzoo, Geegooin, Boi B	Butterscotch	Rhythm Power	3:01
4.	"GG"	Yoske	EastWest, Yoske, Savage House Gang	Ailee, Hyoyeon, Jiwoo	3:16
Total length:					12:42

=== Good Girl Final ===
Released on July 3, 2020
No.	Title	Lyrics	Music	Artist	Length
1.	"Sorry for winning" (잘나가서 미안)	Queen Wasabii, Sleeq, Kohein	Savage House Gang, Queen Wasabii, Sleeq, Kohein	Queen Wasabii, Sleeq	3:24
2.	"Moonlight"	Score (13), Megatone (13), 88247 (13), Jamie, Cheetah	Score (13), Megatone (13), 88247 (13)	Jamie, Cheetah	2:58
3.	"Wet"	G-high, Yoon Jong-sung, Reda (MonoTree)	G-high, Yoon Jong-sung, Reda (MonoTree)	Jiwoo	3:15
4.	"Mermaid (feat. Rohann)" (목소리)	Jinri (Full8loom), Rohann	Youngkwang's Faces (Full8loom), Jinri (Full8loom)	Yeeun	3:33
5.	"I Do What I Want"	Lee Young-ji	Park Hae-il (Yummy Tone), Jerry Potter (Yummy Tone), Lee Young-ji	Lee Young-ji, Hyoyeon	3:26
6.	"Grenade"	Yoske, Alive Knob, Ailee, Yunhway	EastWest, Yoske, 91.6 (1by1), Alive Knob, Yunhway	Yunhway, Ailee	3:09

== Ratings ==
Ep. #	Original Airdate	Nielsen Korea Ratings Nationwide
1	May 14, 2020	0.4%
2	May 21, 2020	0.3%
3	May 28, 2020	0.3%
4	June 4, 2020	0.3%
5	June 11, 2020	0.3%
6	June 18, 2020	0.3%
7	June 25, 2020	0.4%
8	July 2, 2020	0.3%
