= Sleeq =

South Korean rapper

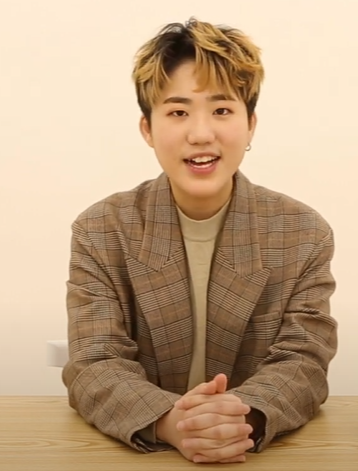
- Sleeq in 2021

Background information
- Born: Kim Ryeong-hwa; July 4, 1991 (age 35)
- Origin: South Korea
- Genre: Hip hop
- Occupation: Rapper
- Years active: 2013–present
- Label: Daze Alive

Korean name
- Hangul: 김령화
- RR: Gim Ryeonghwa
- MR: Kim Ryŏnghwa

Kim Ryeong-hwa (Korean: 김령화; born July 4, 1991), better known by her stage name Sleeq (슬릭), is a South Korean rapper. She joined the hip hop record label Daze Alive in 2013, and has released two full-length albums: Colossus (2016) and Life Minus F is Lie (2018).

== Discography ==
=== Studio albums ===
Title	Album details	Peak chart positions	Sales
Title	Album details	KOR	Sales
Colossus	Released: June 2, 2016; Label: Daze Alive; Format: CD, digital download	48	—N/a
Life Minus F is Lie	Released: May 24, 2018; Label: Daze Alive; Format: CD, digital download	89	—N/a
"—" denotes album did not chart.

=== Mini albums ===
Title	Album details	Peak chart positions	Sales
Title	Album details	KOR	Sales
FOMMY HILTIGER (with Don Malik)	Released: January 25, 2017; Label: Daze Alive; Format: CD, digital download	—	—N/a
"—" denotes album did not chart.

== Filmography ==
=== Television ===
Year	Title	Network	Role	Ref.
2020	Good Girl	Mnet	Herself	

== Awards and nominations ==
Year	Award	Category	Work	Result	Ref.
2017	Korean Hip-hop Awards	Underrated Album of the Year	Colossus	Won	
