= 15& =

South Korean vocal duo

- Also known as: Fifteen And
- Origin: Seoul, South Korea
- Genres: K-pop; R&B; soul
- Years active: 2012–2015
- Label: JYP
- Past members: Baek Ye-rin; Park Ji-min
- Website: 15and.jype.com

15& (Korean: 피프틴앤드, also known as Fifteen And) was a South Korean duo formed by JYP Entertainment in 2012. The duo consisted of Park Ji-min and Baek Ye-rin. The name refers to fifteen being their age at debut, with the ampersand meaning they can continue to have success into the future. They released their debut single "I Dream" on October 5, 2012. Following a four-year hiatus which began in February 2015, the group de facto disbanded upon the expiration of both members' contracts with JYP Entertainment in 2019.

== History ==
=== Formation ===
In 2012, Park Ji-min was the first-place winner of the first season of the South Korean reality TV competition K-pop Star. With the opportunity of signing with three major record labels (YG Entertainment, SM Entertainment and JYP Entertainment), she had chosen to sign with JYP Entertainment on May 21.

When Baek Ye-rin was ten years old, she was introduced as an "R&B genius" on Star King. In 2008, she auditioned with Beyoncé's "Listen" and was accepted as a trainee at the same time as 2PM's Wooyoung and Highlight's Doo-joon. Baek had been a JYP trainee for five years before she officially debuted with Park.

=== 2012–2013: Debut with I Dream and Somebody ===
15&'s debut single I Dream was released on October 5, 2012. The duo's debut officially began on October 7, 2012, performing on SBS's Inkigayo. On October 12, 2012, 15& held their 'school attack' guerrilla concerts. The girls performed at the Chungdam Middle School, Eonnam Middle School, Sungil Information High School and Dankook University. Supported by KT Corporation's Genie Music, the concert attracted both students and local residents' attendance.

15&'s second single Somebody was released on April 7, 2013. The music video showed the two parodying the "K-Pop Star" judge panel while reacting to staged auditions/cameos by Park Jin-young and some of Park Ji-min's fellow contestants from K-pop Star 1. On April 7, 2013, 15& made their comeback performance on K-pop Star 2 finale with "Somebody". Upon its release on the same day, the song rose to the summit of music charts on Olleh, Melon, Daum and others.

=== 2014–2019: Can't Hide It, Sugar, Love is Madness, and unofficial disbandment ===
15&'s third single Can't Hide It was released on April 13. On the same day, they made their comeback performance on K-pop Star 3 finale with "Can't Hide It." It was also revealed that their first album is scheduled to be released in May 2014. 15&'s first album Sugar was released on May 26, 2014. They made their comeback on Mnet's M Countdown on May 29, 2014.

15& released the fourth single Love Is Madness, featuring Kanto of Troy on February 9, 2015. They performed the song for the first time along with other songs on February 14, 2015 for their Valentine's Day concert for singles.

Following four year of hiatus, the expiration and non-renewal of Park Ji-min's contract with JYP Entertainment in August 2019 led to the group's de facto disbanding.

== Discography ==
=== Studio albums ===
Title	Album details	Peak chart positions	Sales
Title	Album details	KOR	Sales
Sugar	Released: May 26, 2014; Label: JYP Entertainment; Format: CD, digital download	9	KOR: 2,000+

=== Singles ===
Title	Year	Peak chart positions		Sales (download)	Album
Title	Year	KOR Gaon	KOR Hot 100	Sales (download)	Album
"I Dream"	2012	6	11	KOR: 823,170+	Sugar
"Somebody"	2013	3	10	KOR: 746,025+	Sugar
"Can't Hide It" (티가 나나봐, Tiga Nanabwa)	2014	1	3	KOR: 671,971+	Sugar
"Sugar"	2014	17	36	KOR: 189,829+	Sugar
"Love Is Madness" (사랑은 미친짓) featuring Kanto of Troy	2015	2	—	KOR: 635,283+	Non-album single
"—" denotes releases that did not chart or were not released in that region.

=== Other charted songs ===
Title	Year	Peak chart positions	Sales	Album
Title	Year	KOR Gaon	Sales	Album
"Rain & Cry"	2014	46	KOR: 52,613 (DL)	Sugar
"Star"	2014	85	KOR: 25,834 (DL)	Sugar
"Not Today Not Tomorrow"	2014	95	KOR: 23,805 (DL)	Sugar

== Awards and nominations ==
Year	Award	Category	Nominated work	Result
2013	22nd Seoul Music Awards	Best New Artist	—N/a	Nominated
2015	24th Seoul Music Awards	Bonsang Award	Can't Hide It	Nominated
2015	24th Seoul Music Awards	Popularity Award	Can't Hide It	Nominated
2015	24th Seoul Music Awards	Hallyu Special Award	Can't Hide It	Nominated
2015	7th Melon Music Awards	Best R&B / Soul Song	Love is Madness (feat. Kanto of Troy)	Nominated
2016	25th Seoul Music Awards	Bonsang Award	Love is Madness (feat. Kanto of Troy)	Nominated
2016	25th Seoul Music Awards	Popularity Award	Love is Madness (feat. Kanto of Troy)	Nominated
2016	25th Seoul Music Awards	Hallyu Special Award	Love is Madness (feat. Kanto of Troy)	Nominated
