= Sugar (15& album) =

Studio album by 15&
- Released: May 26, 2014
- Recorded: 2012―2014
- Genres: K-pop; R&B; soul
- Length: 35:09
- Labels: JYP; KT Music
- Producers: J.Y. Park; Sim Eun-ji; Honeydew'O; Lee Gi; Noh Ju-hwan; Gruzio; Tommy Park; Cheon Da-yoon; Son Young-jin; Cho Seung-ho; Ryan S. Jhun

Singles from Sugar
- 1. "I Dream" Released: October 4, 2012; 2. "Somebody" Released: April 7, 2013; 3. "Can't Hide It" Released: April 13, 2014; 4. "Sugar" Released: May 26, 2014

Sugar is a studio album and official first major release by South Korean duo 15&, It was released on May 26, 2014 by JYP Entertainment with the song of the same name serving as the lead track for the album. The album consists of ten tracks which also includes three tracks that have been previously released since 2012.

== Background and release ==
In early April 2014, they released their third single, "Can't Hide It". On April 13, 2014, they made their comeback stage on K-pop Star 3 finale with "Can't Hide It." It was also revealed that their first album was scheduled to be released in May 2014. On May 26, 2014, the album was released digitally and physically along with the music video of their lead single on YouTube.

== Promotions ==
15& first performed "Sugar" on May 25, 2014 at SBS's Inkigayo.

Live videos of the 6 tracks were upload on YouTube daily at 12pm (KST) beginning May 26–31, 2014.

- Rain & Cry on May 26
- Star on May 27
- Not Today Not Tomorrow on May 28
- Oh My God on May 29
- Shy My Boy on May 30
- Silly Boy on May 31

== Track listing ==
No.	Title	Writer(s)	Producer(s)	Length
1.	"Star"	Sim Eun-ji	Sim Eun-ji	3:26
2.	"Sugar"	Sim Eun-ji, Deez, Andrew Choi, Jimin	Sim Eun-ji	3:18
3.	"Shy Ma Boy"	Honeydew'O, Ecobridge	Honeydew'O	3:26
4.	"Oh My God"	Lee Gi, Noh Ju-hwan	Lee Gi, Noh Ju-hwan	3:35
5.	"Rain & Cry"	Gruzio	Gruzio	3:34
6.	"Not Today Not Tomorrow"	Tommy Park, Joo Hyo, David Jurgens	Tommy Park	3:31
7.	"Silly Boy"	Cheon Da-yoon, Son Young-jin, Cho Seung-ho	Cheon Da-yoon, Son Young-jin, Cho Seung-ho	3:30
8.	"Somebody"	Sim Eun-ji, Ryan S. Jhun, Antwann Frost	Sim Eun-ji, Ryan S. Jhun	3:10
9.	"Can't Hide It" (티가 나나봐; Tiga Nanabwa)	J.Y. Park "The Asian Soul", Hong Ji-sang	J.Y. Park "The Asian Soul"	3:04
10.	"I Dream"	Kim Eun-soo, Sim Eun-ji	Sim Eun-ji	4:35
Total length:				35:09

== Chart performance ==
=== Album chart ===
Country	Chart	Peak position
South Korea (Gaon Music Chart)	Weekly albums chart	8
South Korea (Gaon Music Chart)	Monthly albums chart	14

=== Sales ===
Chart	Sales
Gaon physical sales	2,378+
