= Cheetah (rapper) =

South Korean rapper (born 1990)

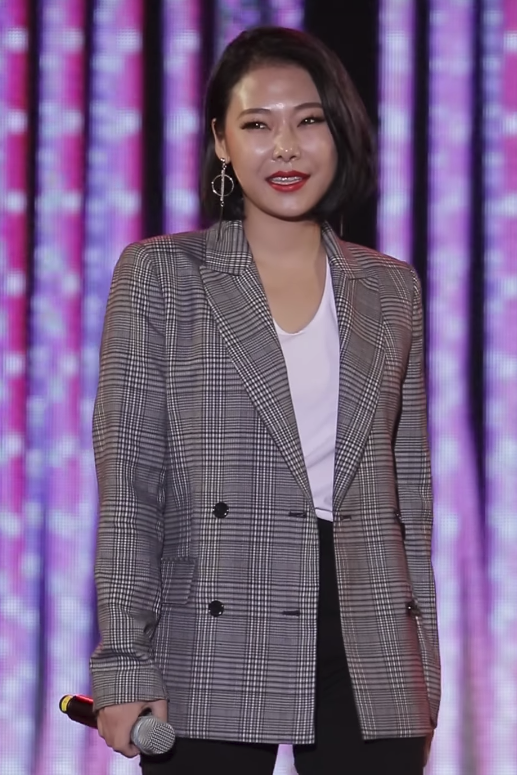
- Cheetah in 2017

Background information
- Born: Kim Eun-young; May 25, 1990 (age 36); Busan, South Korea
- Genre: Korean hip hop
- Occupation: Rapper
- Years active: 2010–present
- Label: XX Entertainment
- Formerly of: Blacklist

Korean name
- Hangul: 김은영
- RR: Gim Eunyeong
- MR: Kim Ŭnyŏng

Kim Eun-young (Korean: 김은영; born May 25, 1990), known by her stage name Cheetah (치타), is a South Korean rapper. Cheetah rose to fame as the winner on the TV competition Unpretty Rapstar. She debuted in 2010 with the song "Stop (Money Can't Buy Me Love)" as a part of the duo Blacklist and was signed under C9 Entertainment. In April 2020, she left C9 Entertainment, which she belonged to from her debut, and founded the one-person agency, Ceuda Entertainment.

== Career ==
Before debuting in the music industry, Cheetah originally performed as an underground rapper on the streets after dropping out of high school. However, in July 2010 she officially debuted with the song "Stop (Money Can't Buy Me Love)" as a part of the hip-hop duo, Blacklist. With fellow member Lucy, the duo released two songs, "Nothing Lasts Forever" and "Stop". However, the group disbanded shortly afterwards.

After Blacklist, Cheetah made several solo appearances including featuring on other rappers' tracks and also appearing on the rap contest TV show Show Me the Money. In 2012, she joined hip-hop artist Crush in another duo group, called Masterpiece. The duo released the single, "Rollercoaster" in May 2012. Again, the group performed poorly with the public and resulted in disbandment.

In 2014, Cheetah released her first EP, called Cheetah Itself. The mini-album showcased her powerful rap and drew attention to her talent as a solo artist. The album aided in placing her on the contestant roster for the rap survival spin-off of Show Me The Money, Unpretty Rapstar.

In early 2015, Cheetah was revealed to be one of the contestants on the TV show Unpretty Rapstar. The competition notably included Lucky J member Jessi, AOA's Jimin, and other underground female rappers. In the show's finale, Cheetah was announced as the winner.

Since her rise in popularity from her appearance and win on Unpretty Rapstar, Cheetah has also appeared in multiple endorsements and fashion spreads. The rapper also participated in designing and releasing a fashion line in collaboration with Push Button.

In March 2015, Cheetah was reported as preparing for a new album, to be released later in the year.

Cheetah released her first single since appearing on Unpretty Rapstar. The song My Number was released on August 2, 2015.

In October 2015 Cheetah collaborated with Kim Junsu on his EP and featured in the track Midnight Show. In the same month, despite being known as a rapper, Cheetah appeared in the MBC singing variety show King of Mask Singer as a jazz singer.

In January 2016, she appeared as a mentor in Produce 101 and continued to reprise her role in the second season, in Produce 48 and in Produce X 101.

In 2018, she released her first Korean-language studio album 28 Identity.

In April 2023, she signed with new agency MLD Entertainment.

== Personal life ==
In January 2007, Cheetah was crossing a street when she was hit by a bus, leading to her hospitalization. Cheetah was sent into a coma for an extended period of time with little chance of waking up. However, she recovered without any major complications, although she lost the ability to sing due to the continued use of a respirator. Cheetah has stated that this traumatic experience is what drove her to succeed and "live with no regrets".

== Discography ==
=== Studio albums ===
Title	Album details	Peak chart positions	Sales
Title	Album details	KOR	Sales
28 Identity	Released: February 28, 2018 (KOR); Label: C9 Entertainment, CJ E&M; Publisher:Loen Entertainment; Formats: CD, digital download	—	—N/a
"—" denotes releases that did not chart.

=== Extended plays ===
Title	Album details	Peak chart positions	Sales
Title	Album details	KOR	Sales
Cheetah Itself	Released: June 27, 2014; Label: C9 Entertainment, CJ E&M; Formats: CD, digital download	—	—N/a
Jazzy Misfits	Released: May 25, 2020; Label: CEUDA Entertainment; Publisher: Genie Music, Stone Music Entertainment; Formats: CD, digital download	—	—N/a
"—" denotes releases that did not chart.

=== Singles ===
Title	Year	Peak chart positions	Sales (DL)	Album
Title	Year	KOR	Sales (DL)	Album
As lead artist
"Expectation" (기대) feat. Morra	2014	—	—N/a	Cheetah Itself
"Coma 07'"	2015	4	KOR: 426,120	Unpretty Rapstar 1
"Like Nobody Knows" (아무도 모르게) feat. Ailee	2015	4	KOR: 691,246	Unpretty Rapstar 1
"My Number"	2015	18	KOR: 151,734	Non-album singles
"Star Wars"	2015	—	—N/a	Non-album singles
"Not Today"	2016	—	KOR: 16,373	Non-album singles
"Style Diet" feat. Kangnam	2017	—	—N/a	Non-album singles
"Blurred Lines" feat. Hanhae	2017	—	—N/a	28 Identity
"I'll Be There"	2018	—	—N/a	28 Identity
"Stagger"	2018	—	—N/a	28 Identity
"Flight" feat. Chaboom	2019	—	—N/a	Non-album single
"Need Your Love	2020	—	—N/a	Jazzy Misfits
"Sorry" (개)	2020	—	—N/a	Non-album singles
"Villain" feat. Jamie	2021	— (Note: "Villain" did not enter the Gaon Digital Chart, but peaked at number 195 on the Gaon Download Chart.)	—N/a	Non-album singles
Collaborations
"My Type" with Jessi feat. Kangnam	2015	2	KOR: 778,193	Unpretty Rapstar 1
"Can You Feel Me" (사랑이 온다) with Baek Ji-young	2016	7	KOR: 281423	Non-album singles
"Get It?" with Younha and Ha:tfelt	2016	—	—N/a	Non-album singles
"Don't Speak" with Ali	2017	—	—N/a	Non-album singles
"I Am" with Lee Hong-gi	2018	—	—N/a	DO n DO
"HAN" with Park Bom	2019	—	—N/a	Queendom < Cover Contest >, Pt. 1
"Fall in Fall (Live ver.)" (가을타나봐) with Yoon Min-soo	2019	—	—N/a	The Call 2 Project No.1
"First Impression" (첫인상) with Hwang Chi-yeul	2019	—	—N/a	The Call 2 Project No.2
"My Love" (님아) with Yoon Min-soo, Song Ga-in	2019	—	—N/a	The Call 2 Project No.4
"Bastard" (놈놈놈) with Yoon Min-soo, Baekho	2019	—	—N/a	The Call 2 Project No.5
"Don't Worry " (건강하고 아프지마요) with Yoon Min-soo, Song Ga-in, Baekho	2019	—	—N/a	The Call 2 Final Project
"Witch" (마녀사냥) with Yeeun, Jiwoo, Jamie, Hyoyeon	2020	—	—N/a	Good Girl Episode 3
"Moonlight" with Jamie	2020	—	—N/a	Good Girl Final
"With A Song" with JeA, Hayoung, Eunkwang, Parc Jae-jung	2020	—	—N/a	Non-album single
Soundtrack appearances
"Side Road" (골목길) as Naratmalssami	2015	—	—N/a	King of Mask Singer Episodes 27
"Ari" (아리)	2019	—	—N/a	Black Money OST
"Feel It!"	2020	—	—N/a	Good Casting OST Part 1
"Memories of a Shot" (한잔의 추억)	2020	—	—N/a	OLD X NEW OST
"We're All Lonely People" (외로운 사람들)	2021	—	—N/a	[Vol.83] You Hee yul's Sketchbook: 53th Voice 'Sketchbook X CHEETAH'
"—" denotes releases that did not chart.

=== Appearances in albums ===
Title	Year	Album
"Magic Carpet Ride" (매직 카펫 라이드) as Naratmalssami with Park Jung-ah	2015	King of Mask Singer Episodes 27
"Come Follow Me" with Yang Mira	2017	Hip-hop People 2 FINAL I
"Q"	2017	Immortal Songs: Singing the Legend (Kim Hee-Gap & Yang In-ja Part. 2)
"Dare to Stop" (감히 막아) with YDG	2019	KILLBILL 3rd stage

== Filmography ==
=== Film ===
Year	Title	Role	Notes	Ref.
2020	Jazzy Misfits	Sun-deok	Film debut	

=== Television series ===
Year	Title	Role	Notes
2016	My Horrible Boss	Herself	Cameo (Ep. 13)

=== Variety show ===
Year	Title	Notes/Ref.
2012	Show Me The Money	Contestant
2015	Unpretty Rapstar	Contestant; winner
2015	King of Mask Singer	Contestant as "Naratmalssami" (Ep. 27)
2016	Hip Hop Tribe	Producer
2016	Produce 101	Trainer
2016	Hip Hop Tribe 2: Game of Thrones	Producer
2016	Two Yoo Project Sugar Man	Contestant with Kangnam; winner (Ep. 18)
2017	Produce 101 Season 2	Trainer
2017	Immortal Songs: Singing the Legend	Contestant (Ep. 303)
2017	Strong My Way	Cast member
2018	Living Together in Empty Room	Landlord (Ep. 24–26)
2018	Produce 48	Trainer
2018	High School Rapper	Mentor
2018	Mimi Shop	Cast member
2018	Strong My Way 2	Cast member
2019	Target: Billboard - Kill Bill	Contestant
2019	Produce X 101	Trainer
2020	Player 7	Contestant
2020	Good Girl	Contestant
2020	King of Mask Singer	Contestant as "Virgin Ghost" (Ep. 267–268)
2021	We Become One 2021	Host
2021	Mobi's Marvel	Cast Member
2021	Chosun Panstar	Judge
2021	Awesome Romance	Host
2021–2022	Goal Girls	Cast Member; Season 2
