= Me (CLC song) =

2019 single by CLC

Single by CLC
- Released: May 29, 2019
- Recorded: 2019
- Genre: Reggae fusion; trap
- Length: 3:13
- Label: Cube Entertainment
- Songwriter(s): MosPick; Yeeun (CLC)
- Producer(s): MosPick: Simon Hong

CLC singles chronology
"No" (2019)	"Me" (2019)	"Devil" (2019)

Music video
- "ME(美)" on YouTube

"Me" (stylized as "ME (美)") is a song recorded by South Korean girl group CLC. It was released by Cube Entertainment on May 29, 2019, as a digital single. A music video for the song was also released on May 29.

== Background and release ==
On May 22, 2019, it was announced that the group will be releasing a new song after four months since their latest release. The preview of the song was shown at their 2019 Dream Concert performance, held on May 18.

The song was released as a digital single on May 29, 2019, through several music portals, including Melon and iTunes.

The song debuted at number 8 on the Gaon Social Chart for the week ending June 1, 2019.

== Composition and critical reception ==
The song was written by MosPick, who also served as producer. Member Yeeun contributed in writing the lyrics. Billboard described the song as "a propulsive electronic dance track, which spends its time building off of mellow, reggae-inspired melodies to lead into dynamic trap drops and a chorus full of blaring horns, chanting refrains and quirky synths". Adding that "with tonal shifts throughout, "Me" showcases the wide range of CLC's charisma, putting forth each member's distinct tone and style as they sing about their beauty and self-worth".

"Me (美)" uses the Chinese character as a double meaning, as the translation means "beautiful" and is pronounced like the English title word.

== Commercial performance ==
The song peaked at number 5 on the US World Digital Songs chart, selling 1,000 copies, seven months after the initial release, becoming the second-best-selling K-pop song that week in America (only behind BTS' "Black Swan"). It was attributed to the late addition of the song to U.S. digital platforms until late February 2020, since the song was only available on streaming services.

== Music video ==
A music video for the song was released alongside the single on May 29. The video features the act performing fierce, stomping choreography in military band outfits while they each boldly perform in solo shots, with several members seen in modern updates of traditional Korean hanboks. The video surpassed the 2.2 million views in 17 hours since the release.

== Charts ==
Chart (2020)	Peak position
US World Digital Songs (Billboard)	5

== Release history ==
Region	Date	Format	Label	Ref.
Various	May 29, 2019	Digital download, streaming	Cube Entertainment	
