= Jamie (singer) =

South Korean singer (born 1997)

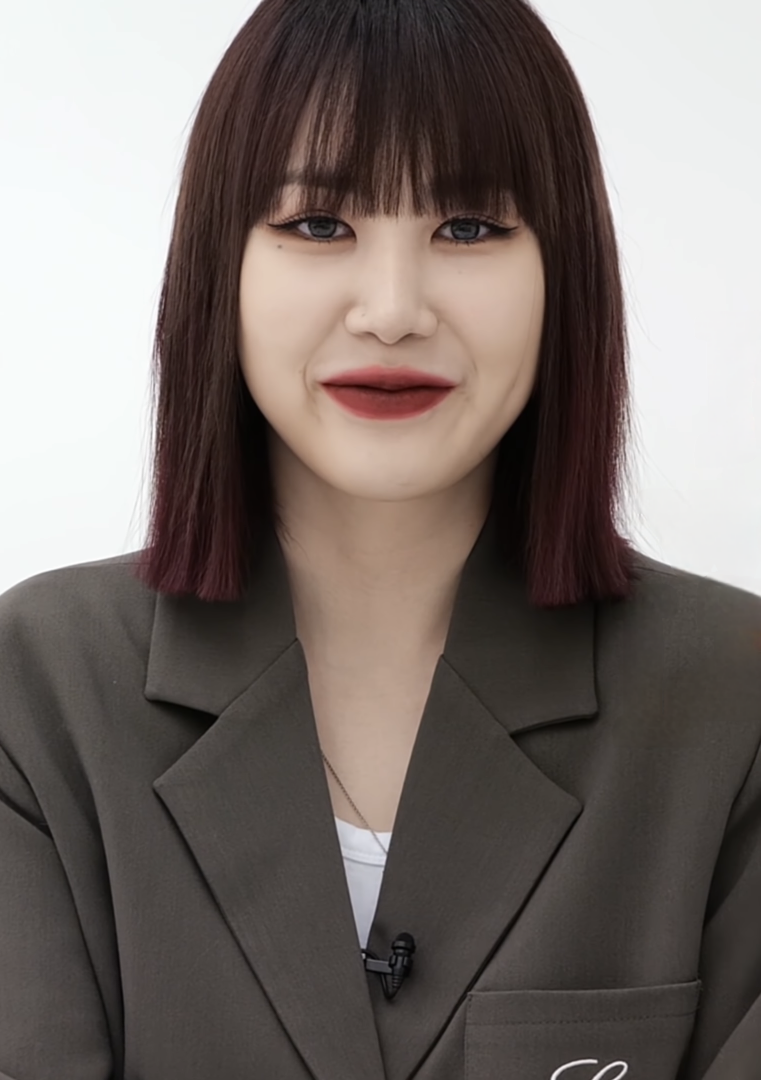
- Jamie in December 2021

Background information
- Also known as: Jimin Park; Jamie
- Born: July 5, 1997 (age 28); Daejeon, South Korea
- Genres: K-pop; R&B
- Occupations: Singer; songwriter; television host
- Years active: 2012–present
- Labels: JYP; Warner Music Korea
- Formerly of: 15&; M.O.L.A; JYP Nation

Korean name
- Hangul: 박지민
- Hanja: 朴志敏
- RR: Bak Jimin
- MR: Pak Chimin

Park Ji-min (Korean: 박지민; born July 5, 1997), known professionally as Jamie or Jamie Park, and formerly Jimin Park, is a South Korean singer, songwriter, and television host. She is best known as the winner of the first season of K-pop Star and as a former member of the vocal duo 15& and the project group M.O.L.A. She was formerly a co-host of the variety show After School Club from 2014 to 2022.

== Early life and education ==
Park Ji-min was born on July 5, 1997, in Daejeon. She lived in Thailand for eight years and went to Garden International School Bangkok where she was given the English name Jamie. Her family currently lives in Seoul. Jamie speaks Korean (her native language), fluent English, and basic Thai. She has graduated at the Hanlim School of Performing Arts alongside group member Baek Yerin, as well as label mate Yugyeom of Got7 in 2016.

== Career ==
=== K-pop Star and 15& ===
In 2011, Jamie participated in the first season of competition television show K-pop Star. Jamie later finished in first place in the competition and had the opportunity to sign with YG, SM or JYPE. On May 21, 2012, Jamie officially chose to sign with JYP Entertainment. Park also received a brand new Hyundai i40 and 300 million won (~$257,400 USD), was cast in a drama, and was also given an opportunity to sign a contract as a CF model.

On September 19, 2012, it was announced that Jamie would debuting with a duo along with Baek Yerin. Jamie officially debuted with duo 15& with released digital single "I Dream" on October 5, 2012 and making official debut stage on the music program Inkigayo on October 7. 15& eventually went on hiatus after February 2015 and de facto disbanded following Jamie's departure from JYP Entertainment.

=== Solo career ===
In July 2014, Jamie became a co-host for Arirang TV's After School Club and has been the longest-serving host on the show and has hosted with many co-hosts including Eric Nam and eaJ.

On March 31, 2015 Park Jin-young revealed that Jamie would make her solo debut. She released her debut single "Hopeless Love" on April 5 with the name Jimin Park and made her debut stage before the finals of K-pop Star 4 on the same day.

On May 19, 2015, producer group Sweetune revealed that Jamie and Eric Nam would release a duet called "Dream" for Charity Project. The song was released on May 28, 2015.

On August 14, 2015, Jamie announced a project group she had formed with Seung-youn of UNIQ and rapper Nathan. Their group name was later revealed to be M.O.L.A (Make Our Life Awesome), and they released their first track "My Way" on August 20. Their second song "Trick or Treat" was released on October 31, where Jimin made her second recorded comeback as a rapper.

On August 23, 2016, Jamie released her first EP 19 to 20 with the lead single 'Try'. Due to Naver's V-LIVE, Jamie stated that 19 to 20 is about "her story" and hoped that her fans would be able to connect to her better and build a stronger relationship with her first self-composed album.

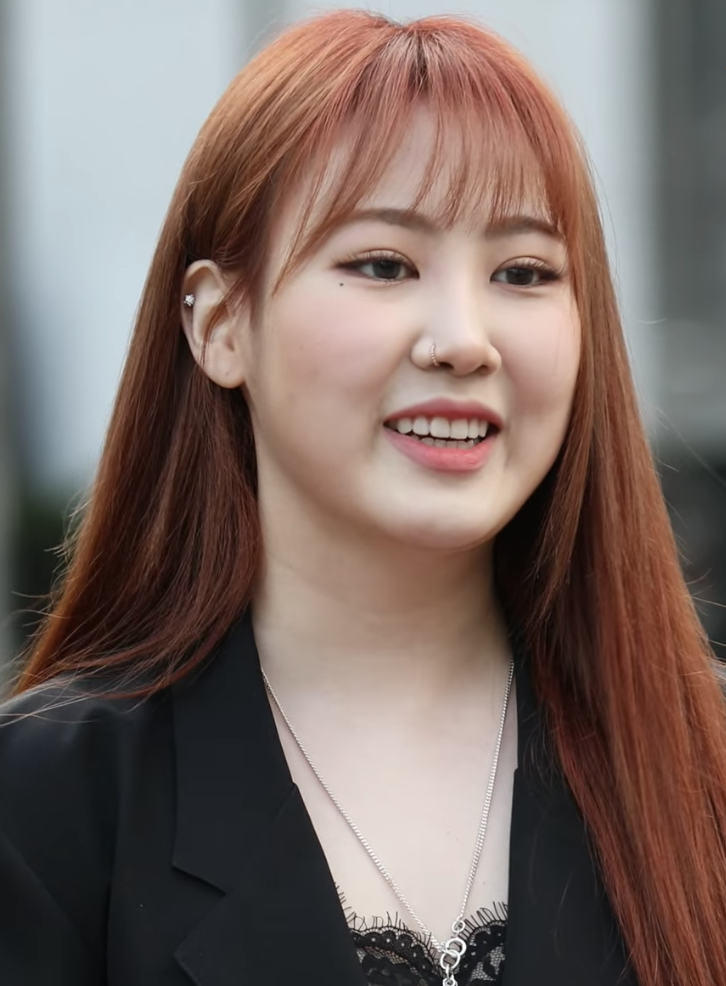
Jamie in 2018

On September 4, 2018, Jamie released her second EP Jiminxjamie, where she participated in the composition for majority of the tracks.

Following the expiration of her seven-year contract with JYP Entertainment, Jamie left the company on August 6, 2019.

On April 21, 2020, it was announced that Jamie has signed an exclusive contract with Warner Music Korea, and will continue to promote as Jamie.

On September 3, 2020, Jamie made her first comeback under her new agency Warner Music Korea with single "Numbers" feat Changmo Her second song "Apollo 11", featuring Jay Park released on November 11, 2020.

On December 8, 2020, Jamie released holiday song "5 Christmas Languages"

On September 15, 2021, Jamie released the digital single "No Numbers", featuring Jmin.

==== 2022–present ====
On February 3, 2022, Jamie released the English digital single "Pity Party".

After hosting for over seven years, on August 12, 2022, it was confirmed that Jamie was preparing to leave After School Club in order to focus on her music career and to work on her upcoming album. Her last appearance on After School Club was on August 16, 2022.

On August 17, Jamie confirmed that she was preparing for a comeback in October, and is currently preparing for the release of a new EP album.

On August 29, 2022, the label released Jamie's new EP album One Bad Night through their official SNS, which will be released on October 5.

On August 30, 2022, Jamie released a poster for her North American 2022 tour through her official SNS channel. It will host concerts in seven cities: Los Angeles (LA), Vancouver, Toronto, Brooklyn (New York), Dallas, Seattle and San Francisco From 10 to 23 October.

On January 5, 2023, Warner Music Korea tweeted that they and Jamie agreed to terminate her exclusive contract upon expiration, and thanked her for her hard work and dedication.

== Philanthropy ==
In October 2012, Jamie donated 50 million won (~$45,000 USD) to Hanbit Performing Arts Company for blind musicians. She became interested in the program after meeting with fellow K-pop Star contestant Kim Soo-hwan, who currently attends the Hanbit Performing Arts Company. Jamie shared, "The Hanbit Performing Arts Company hosts young, elementary school students as well as professional performers. Although they are blind, they are musicians who are performing with amazing talent. I want to be at least a small help to those who have the same love for music that I have." She also donated 50 million won (~$45,000 USD) to World Vision.

On May 28, 2015, Jamie collaborated with singer Eric Nam for their song, "Dream", produced by Sweetune. They revealed all profit made from the song would be donated to charity.

== Discography ==
=== Extended plays ===
List of digital albums, with selected chart positions and sales figures
Title	Album details	Peak chart positions		Sales
Title	Album details	KOR	US World	Sales
19 to 20	Released: August 23, 2016; Label: JYP Entertainment; Format: Digital download	—	11	—N/a
jiminxjamie	Released: September 4, 2018; Label: JYP Entertainment; Format: Digital download; Track listing: 1. April Fools (0401); 2. Do You? (위니) (feat. OLNL); 3. Count You Out (하나 빼기 둘); 4. PUTP (전화받아) (feat. Kino, Woodz, Nathan); 5. Stars (별) (Prod. by LambC)	—	11	—N/a
One Bad Night	Released: October 5, 2022; Label: Warner Music Korea; Format: CD, digital download, streaming	52	—	KOR: 1682
"—" denotes a recording that did not chart.

=== Singles ===
Title	Year	Peak chart positions	Sales	Album
Title	Year	KOR	Sales	Album
As lead artist
"Hopeless Love"	2015	17	KOR: 95,931	Non-album single
"Try" (다시)	2016	17	KOR: 110,191	19 to 20
"April Fools (0401)"	2018	— (Note: "April Fools (0401)" did not enter the Gaon Digital Chart, but peaked at number 51 on the Gaon Download Chart.)	—N/a	jiminxjamie
"Stay Beautiful"	2019	—	—N/a	Non-album singles
"Numbers" (feat. Changmo)	2020	175	—N/a	Non-album singles
"Apollo 11" (feat. Jay Park)	2020	—	—N/a	Non-album singles
"5 Christmas Languages" (5가지 Christmas)	2020	—	—N/a	Non-album singles
"No Numbers" (feat. Jmin)	2021	— (Note: "No Numbers" did not enter the Gaon Digital Chart, but peaked at number 168 on the Gaon Download Chart.)	—N/a	Non-album singles
"Pity Party"	2022	— (Note: "Pity Party" did not enter the Gaon Digital Chart, but peaked at number 59 on the Gaon Download Chart.)	—N/a	Non-album singles
"3D Woman"	2022	— (Note: "3D Woman" did not enter the Circle Digital Chart, but peaked at number 178 on the Circle Download Chart.)	—N/a	One Bad Night
"Dancing with you in the Rain"	2023	—	—N/a	Non-album single
As featured artist
"Dream" (Eric Nam feat. Park Ji-min)	2015	88	—N/a	Non-album single
"Nirvana" (Ravi feat. Park Ji-min)	2018	—	—N/a	Nirvana
"Games" (Jung Jin Woo feat. Park Ji-min)	2018	—	—N/a	Rotate
"Waves" (Kang Daniel feat. Simon Dominic & Jamie)	2020	102	—N/a	Magenta
"Villain" (Cheetah feat. Jamie)	2021	— (Note: "Villain" did not enter the Gaon Digital Chart, but peaked at number 195 on the Gaon Download Chart.)	—N/a	Non-album single
"Joker" (Big Naughty feat. Jamie)	2021	130	—N/a	Bucket List
"Best Friend" (Saweetie featuring Doja Cat, Jamie and Chanmina)	2021	—	—N/a	Non-album singles
"365&7" (PH-1 feat. Jamie)	2021	120	—N/a	Non-album singles
"Runaway" (Owell Mood feat. Jamie)	2021	—	—N/a	Non-album singles
Collaborations
"Busan Memories" (부산에 가면) (with J.Y. Park & Bernard Park)	2015	99	—N/a	Sing the Road #03
"Look Alike" (닮아있어) (with D.ear)	2016	55	—N/a	Non-album single
"I'm All Ears" (다둘어줄게) (with Choi Young-jae)	2018	—	—N/a	Ready to Listen Part 2
"Wouldn't Be Me" (with 22Bullets & Fedde Le Grand)	2022	—	—N/a	Non-album single
"Love Me Crazy" (with Lim Kim)	2023	— (Note: "Love Me Crazy" did not enter the Circle Digital Chart, but peaked at number 138 on the Circle Download Chart.)	—N/a	SM Station Season 4
"—" denotes a recording that did not chart.

=== Other charted songs ===
Title	Year	Peak chart positions	Sales	Album
Title	Year	KOR	Sales	Album
As lead artist
"Young해" (feat. Young K)	2016	157	KOR: 13,829	19 to 20
"Walkin" (다시 너에게) (feat. Hash Swan)	2016	161	KOR: 13,609	19 to 20
"To Him"	2016	188	KOR: 13,176	19 to 20
"Answer"	2016	248	KOR: 10,654	19 to 20
As featured artist
"Jealousy" (질투가 나) (Baek A-yeon feat. Park Ji-min)	2017	27	—N/a	Bittersweet

=== Soundtrack appearances ===
Year	Song title	Sales	Album
2013	"I Love You" (사랑해)	KOR: 55,642+	Goddess of Fire OST Part 4
2015	"I Want to Keep Seeing You" (자꾸 보고 싶어)	KOR: 88,406+	Orange Marmalade OST Part 5
2016	"Don't Go" (떠나가지마)	KOR: 26,595+	Dear My Friends OST Part 4
2017	"Say I Love You" (괜찮나요)	—N/a	Meloholic OST Part 2
2019	"Deep Voice"	—N/a	The Last Empress OST Part 4
2019	"That I'm Here" (내가 있다는 걸)	—N/a	Catch the Ghost OST Part 6
2020	"Time, Like a Shining Star" (별처럼 빛나는 시간)	—N/a	Hi Bye, Mama! OST Part 1
2020	"Colors" with Yunhway, Sleeq	—N/a	Good Girl Episode 1
2020	"Witch" (마녀사냥) with Yeeun, Jiwoo, Cheetah, Hyoyeon	—N/a	Good Girl Episode 3
2020	"Moonlight" with Cheetah	—N/a	GOOD GIRL FINAL
2020	"Dream" (상상한 꿈)	—N/a	Start-Up OST Part 13
2021	"You Were Beautiful" (예뻤어)	—N/a	Begin Again: Open Mic Episode 1
2021	"A Gloomy Clock" (우울시계) with NIve	—N/a	Begin Again: Open Mic Episode 1
2021	"EX"	—N/a	Begin Again: Open Mic Episode 3
2021	"Wish You Were Gay"	—N/a	Begin Again: Open Mic Episode 4
2021	"Imagine"	—N/a	Begin Again: Open Mic Episode 7
2022	"Moonshine" (꽃 피면 달 생각하고)	—N/a	Moonshine OST Part 6
2022	"Goodbye My Friend" (안녕 My Friend)	—N/a	May I Help You? OST Part 4
2023	"Naked Gold" (Prod. by Czaer)	—N/a	Street Woman Fighter 2 OST Part 1

=== K-pop Star 1 songs ===
Year	Title	Peak chart positions		Sales	Album
Year	Title	KOR Gaon	KOR Billboard	Sales	Album
2012	"꿈에 (In Dream)"	69	59	KOR: 182,285+	SBS K팝 스타 Top 8 (Digital Single)
2012	"Over the Rainbow"	9	19	KOR: 723,753+	SBS K팝 스타 Top 7 (Digital Single)
2012	"Rolling in the Deep"	64	49	KOR: 216,237+	SBS K팝 스타 SPECIAL No.2 (Digital Single)
2012	"I'll Be There"	43	61	KOR: 141,952+	SBS K팝 스타 Top 6 (Digital Single)
2012	"거위의 꿈 (Goose's Dream)"	111	—	KOR: 65,022+	SBS K팝 스타 Top 5 (Digital Single)
2012	"Love On Top"	66	98	KOR: 91,326+	SBS K팝 스타 Top 4 (Digital Single)
2012	"Good Bye Baby" (feat. Lee Ha-yi)	57	57	KOR: 155,005+	SBS K팝 스타 SPECIAL No.3 (Digital Single)
2012	"You Raise Me Up"	56	57	KOR: 140,977+	SBS K팝 스타 Top 3 (Digital Single)
2012	"Music Is My Life"	37	69	KOR: 171,648+	SBS K팝 스타 Top 2 (Digital Single)
2012	"Mercy"	102	—	KOR: 75,019+	SBS K팝 스타 SPECIAL No.4 (Digital Single)
"—" denotes releases that did not chart or were not released in that region.

=== Unofficial original releases ===
Year	Title	Artist
2015	"My Way"	M.O.L.A (Project group)
2015	"속았지? (Trick or Treat)"	M.O.L.A (Project group)
2017	"Chillin'"	M.O.L.A (Project group)
2017	"Chillin'" (5MOLAs ver.)	M.O.L.A (Project group)

== Filmography ==
=== Drama ===
Year	Title	Role	Note
2015	Dream Knight	Got7's Jinyoung's fan	Korean-Chinese Online Drama by JYPE and Youku Tudou

=== Television shows ===
Year	Title	Role	Notes	Ref.
2011	K-pop Star season 1	Contestant	October 4, 2011 – April 20, 2012	
2016	Duet Song Festival	Contestant	Duet with Jung Young-yoon (Episodes 23–24)	
2017	King of Mask Singer	Contestant	as "Listen to My Song and Applaud It Baby Seal" (Episodes 109–110)	
2014–2022	After School Club	Host	March 2015 – August 2022	
2020	Good Girl	Cast		
2022	Style Me	Host	Season 2, Episode 3–6	

=== Music videos ===
Year	Title	Director(s)
2015	"Hopeless Love"	ETUI
2016	"Try" (다시)	NAIVE
2018	"April Fools (0401)"	Unknown
2019	"Stay Beautiful"	Unknown
2020	"Numbers" Feat. CHANGMO	Unknown
2020	"Apollo 11" Feat. Jay Park	Eunbi Jung

== Awards and nominations ==
Year	Award	Category	Nominated work	Result
2015	25th Seoul Music Awards	Bonsang Award	Hopeless Love	Nominated
2015	25th Seoul Music Awards	Popularity Award	Hopeless Love	Nominated
2015	25th Seoul Music Awards	Hallyu Special Award	Hopeless Love	Nominated
